= Croatia women's national junior handball team =

Croatia

Information
- Association: Croatian Handball Federation
- Coach: Vedran Krkač

Colours
1st	2nd

Results

IHF U-20 World Championship
- Appearances: 12 (First in 1995)
- Best result: 4th place (2003)

Europeaan championship
- Appearances: 11 (First in 1998)
- Best result: bronze (2000)
- Last updated on Unknown.

The Croatia women's junior national handball team is the national under-19 handball team of Croatia. It is controlled by the Croatian Handball Federation. Its greatest achievements are 4th place at the 2003 World Championship and bronze at the 2000 European Championship.

== Tournament record ==
=== World Championship ===
Champions Runners up Third place Fourth place

Year	Round	Position	GP	W	D	L	GS	GA	GD
1977 (Romania)	Didn't Qualify								
1979 (Socialist Federal Republic of Yugoslavia)	Didn't Qualify								
1981 (Canada)	Didn't Qualify								
1983 (France)	Didn't Qualify								
1985 (South Korea)	Didn't Qualify								
1987 (Denmark)	Didn't Qualify								
1989 (Nigeria)	Didn't Qualify								
1991 (France)	Didn't Qualify								
1993 (Bulgaria)	Didn't Qualify								
1995 (Brazil)		13th place							
1997 (Ivory Coast)	Didn't Qualify								
1999 (China)	Didn't Qualify								
2001 (Hungary)		10th place							
2003 (North Macedonia)	Semi-finals	4th place							
2005 (Czech Republic)		7th place							
2008 (North Macedonia)		6th place							
2010 (South Korea)		11th place							
2012 (Czech Republic)		10th place							
2014 (Croatia)		10th place							
2016 (Russia)		8th place							
2018 (Hungary)		9th place							
2022 (Slovenia)		12th place							
2024 (North Macedonia)	Didn't Qualify								
2026 (China)		17th place							
Total	12/24	0 Titles							

==== European Championship ====
Champions Runners up Third place Fourth place

European Junior Championship record
Year	Round	Position	GP	W	D	L	GS	GA	GD
(Poland) 1996	Didn't Qualify								
(Slovakia) 1998		10th place							
(France) 2000	Semi-finals	Third place							
(Finland) 2002	Didn't Qualify								
(Czech Republic) 2004	Main Round	5th place							
(Turkey) 2007	Didn't Qualify								
(Hungary) 2009	Didn't Qualify								
(Netherlands) 2011	Main Round	7th place							
(Denmark) 2013		13th place							
(Spain) 2015		11th place							
(Slovenia) 2017		12th place							
(Hungary) 2019		10th place							
(Slovenia) 2021	Main Round	7th place							
(Romania) 2023		16th place							
(Montenegro) 2025	Main Round	8th place							
Total	11 / 15								

== Acknowledgements ==
- Bruna Zrnić was the best right wing and member of all-star team of the 2021 European Championship (45 goals)
