= Alieke van Maurik =

Dutch handball player (born 2005)

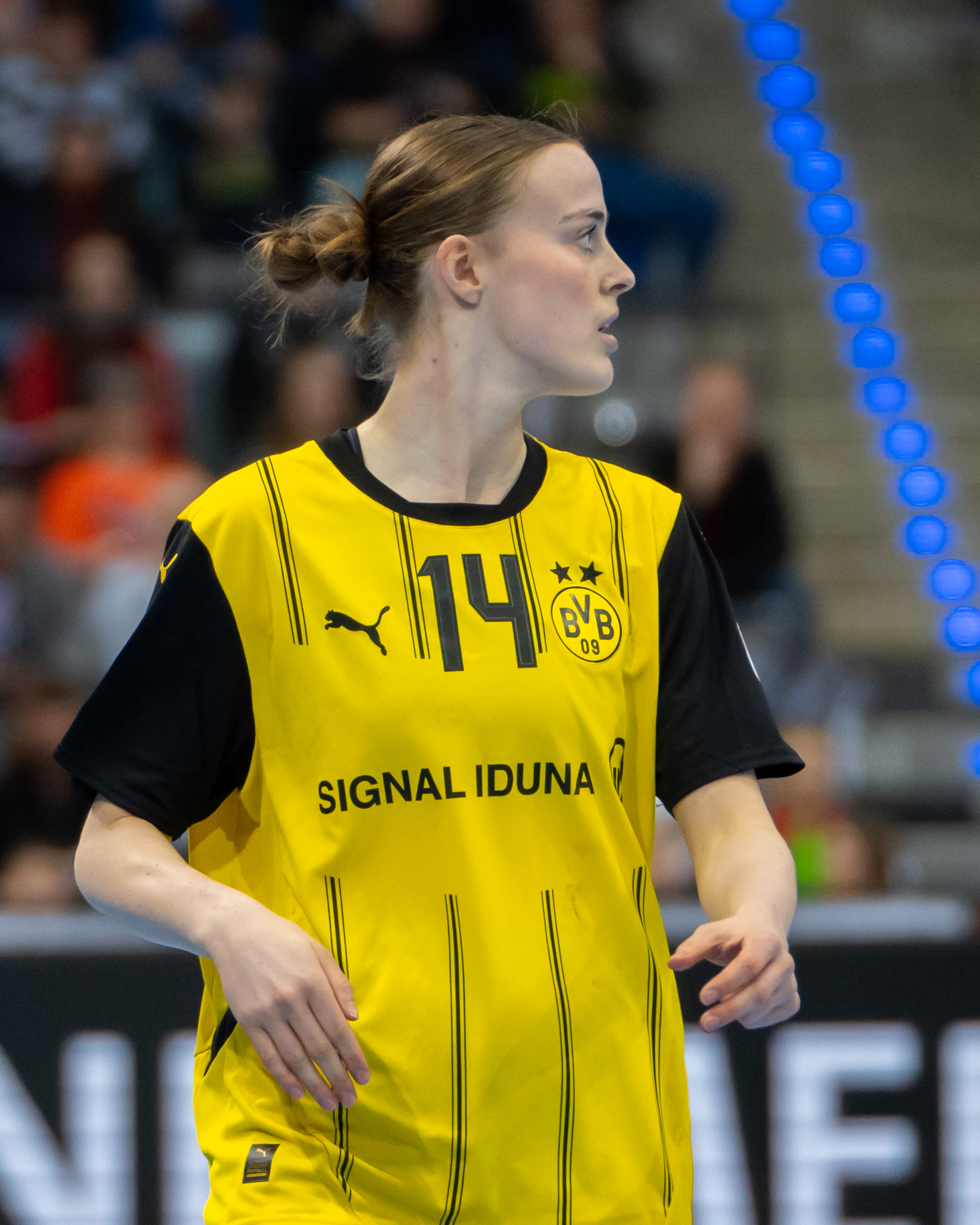
- van Maurik in 2025 for Borussia Dortmund

Personal information
- Nationality: Dutch
- Born: 11 May 2005 (age 21) Capelle aan den IJssel, Netherlands
- Height: 1.81 m (5 ft 11 in)

Sport
- Sport: Handball
- Position: Right back
- Current club: Borussia Dortmund
- Number: 14

Senior clubs
- Years: Team
- –2023: HV Quintus
- 2023–2024: VOC Amsterdam
- 2024–: Borussia Dortmund
National team
Years	Team	Apps	(Gls)
2023–	Netherlands	23	(30)
- Updated on 25 November 2025

Alieke van Maurik (born 11 May 2005) is a Dutch handball player for Borussia Dortmund and the Dutch national team.

== Career ==
Maurik started her senior career at HV Quintus, where she played until 2023. She represented the team in he 2021-22 and 2022-23 EHF Women's European Cup.

In 2023 she joined VOC Amsterdam. A year later she signed for German Borussia Dortmund. Here she won the 2026 DHB-Pokal.

== National team ==
Alieke van Maurik represented the Netherlands at the 2021 European Women's U-17 Handball Championship and at the 2022 IHF Women's U18 Handball World Championship.

She made her debut for the Dutch senior national team on 7 April 2023 in a friendly against Sweden.

A month later she played at the 2023 European Women's U-19 Handball Championship. At the 2024 IHF Women's U20 Handball World Championship she won a bronze medal with the Dutch youth team.

She represented the Netherlands at the 2024 European Women's Handball Championship. A year later she played at the 2025 World Women's Handball Championship, where the Netherlands finished 4th, losing to France in the third-place play-off.
