= 2023 IHF Trophy U19 – North America and the Caribbean =

Women's Junior Handball Championship qualifier

Tournament details
- Host country: Mexico
- Venue: 1 (in 1 host city)
- Dates: 9–13 December
- Teams: 6 (from 1 confederation)

Final positions
- Champions: Mexico
- Runners-up: United States
- Third place: Canada
- Fourth place: Cuba

Tournament statistics
- Matches played: 15

The 2023 IHF Trophy U19 – North America and the Caribbean took place in Mexico City, Mexico, from 9 to 13 December 2023. It acted as the North America and Caribbean qualifying tournament for the 2024 Women's Junior World Handball Championship and 2024 IHF Inter-Continental Trophy.

== Teams ==
- Canada
- Cuba
- Guadeloupe
- Puerto Rico
- Mexico
- United States

== Venue ==
The venue is the Mexican Olympic Training Center in Mexico City

== Standings ==
Pos	Team	Pld	W	D	L	GF	GA	GD	Pts	Qualification
1st place, gold medalist(s)	Mexico (H)	5	3	1	1	135	117	+18	7	2024 Women's Junior World Handball Championship and 2024 IHF Inter-Continental Trophy
2nd place, silver medalist(s)	United States	5	3	1	1	148	134	+14	7	2024 Women's Junior World Handball Championship
3rd place, bronze medalist(s)	Canada	5	3	0	2	139	127	+12	6 (Note: Canada 29–28 Cuba)	
4	Cuba	5	3	0	2	150	137	+13	6	
5	Guadeloupe	5	2	0	3	138	136	+2	4	
6	Puerto Rico	5	0	0	5	138	205	−67	0	

Source: Report
Rules for classification: 1) Points; 2) Head-to-head points; 3) Head-to-head goal difference; 4) Head-to-head goals scored; 5) Goal difference; 6) Goals scored; 7) Draw.
(H) Hosts

== Results ==
All times are local.

9 December 2023; 13:00	Canada	38–19	Puerto Rico	Mexican Olympic Training Center, Mexico City
9 December 2023; 13:00		(18–5)		Mexican Olympic Training Center, Mexico City
9 December 2023; 13:00		Report		Mexican Olympic Training Center, Mexico City

9 December 2023; 15:00	Cuba	26–29	United States	Mexican Olympic Training Center, Mexico City
9 December 2023; 15:00		(10–16)		Mexican Olympic Training Center, Mexico City
9 December 2023; 15:00		Report		Mexican Olympic Training Center, Mexico City

9 December 2023; 17:00	Guadeloupe	24–27	Mexico	Mexican Olympic Training Center, Mexico City
9 December 2023; 17:00		(10–14)		Mexican Olympic Training Center, Mexico City
9 December 2023; 17:00		Report		Mexican Olympic Training Center, Mexico City

10 December 2023; 14:00	Puerto Rico	28–37	Cuba	Mexican Olympic Training Center, Mexico City
10 December 2023; 14:00		(12–18)		Mexican Olympic Training Center, Mexico City
10 December 2023; 14:00		Report		Mexican Olympic Training Center, Mexico City

10 December 2023; 16:00	United States	30–34	Guadeloupe	Mexican Olympic Training Center, Mexico City
10 December 2023; 16:00		(20–13)		Mexican Olympic Training Center, Mexico City
10 December 2023; 16:00		Report		Mexican Olympic Training Center, Mexico City

10 December 2023; 18:00	Mexico	25–22	Canada	Mexican Olympic Training Center, Mexico City
10 December 2023; 18:00		(14–6)		Mexican Olympic Training Center, Mexico City
10 December 2023; 18:00		Report		Mexican Olympic Training Center, Mexico City

11 December 2023; 14:00	Canada	26–33	United States	Mexican Olympic Training Center, Mexico City
11 December 2023; 14:00		(14–18)		Mexican Olympic Training Center, Mexico City
11 December 2023; 14:00		Report		Mexican Olympic Training Center, Mexico City

11 December 2023; 16:00	Cuba	31–27	Guadeloupe	Mexican Olympic Training Center, Mexico City
11 December 2023; 16:00		(12–13)		Mexican Olympic Training Center, Mexico City
11 December 2023; 16:00		Report		Mexican Olympic Training Center, Mexico City

11 December 2023; 18:00	Puerto Rico	19–35	Mexico	Mexican Olympic Training Center, Mexico City
11 December 2023; 18:00		(9–16)		Mexican Olympic Training Center, Mexico City
11 December 2023; 18:00		Report		Mexican Olympic Training Center, Mexico City

12 December 2023; 14:00	United States	32–24	Puerto Rico	Mexican Olympic Training Center, Mexico City
12 December 2023; 14:00		(19–11)		Mexican Olympic Training Center, Mexico City
12 December 2023; 14:00		Report		Mexican Olympic Training Center, Mexico City

12 December 2023; 16:00	Guadeloupe	22–24	Canada	Mexican Olympic Training Center, Mexico City
12 December 2023; 16:00		(14–9)		Mexican Olympic Training Center, Mexico City
12 December 2023; 16:00		Report		Mexican Olympic Training Center, Mexico City

12 December 2023; 18:00	Cuba	28–24	Mexico	Mexican Olympic Training Center, Mexico City
12 December 2023; 18:00		(14–10)		Mexican Olympic Training Center, Mexico City
12 December 2023; 18:00		Report		Mexican Olympic Training Center, Mexico City

13 December 2023; 13:00	Canada	29–28	Cuba	Mexican Olympic Training Center, Mexico City
13 December 2023; 13:00		(14–13)		Mexican Olympic Training Center, Mexico City
13 December 2023; 13:00		Report		Mexican Olympic Training Center, Mexico City

13 December 2023; 15:00	Puerto Rico	24–31	Guadeloupe	Mexican Olympic Training Center, Mexico City
13 December 2023; 15:00		(9–18)		Mexican Olympic Training Center, Mexico City
13 December 2023; 15:00		Report		Mexican Olympic Training Center, Mexico City

13 December 2023; 17:00	Mexico	24–24	United States	Mexican Olympic Training Center, Mexico City
13 December 2023; 17:00		(10–13)		Mexican Olympic Training Center, Mexico City
13 December 2023; 17:00		Report		Mexican Olympic Training Center, Mexico City

== See also ==
- Nor.Ca. Women's Handball Championship
- 2024 Women's Junior World Handball Championship
- 2024 IHF Inter-Continental Trophy
