= South Korea women's national junior handball team =

South Korean handball team

South Korea

Information
- Association: Korea Handball Federation
- Coach: Kim Kyoong-jin

Colours
1st	2nd

Results

IHF U-20 World Championship
- Appearances: 22 (First in 1981)
- Best result: (gold) Champions : (2014)
- Last updated on Unknown.

The South Korea women's junior national handball team is the national under-19 handball team of South Korea. Controlled by the Korea Handball Federation that is an affiliate of the International Handball Federation IHF as well as a member of the Asian Handball Federation AHF, The team represents South Korea in international matches.

== Statistics ==
=== World Championship ===
Champions Runners up Third place Fourth place

Year	Round	Position	GP	W	D	L	GS	GA	GD
1977 (Romania)	Didn't Qualify								
1979 (Socialist Federal Republic of Yugoslavia)	Didn't Qualify								
1981 (Canada)	Semi-finals	4th place	7	4	0	3	171	148	+23
1983 (France)	Semi-finals	3rd place	7	5	1	1	195	161	+34
1985 (South Korea)	Final	2nd place	9	8	0	1	253	143	+110
1987 (Denmark)	Semi-finals	4th place							
1989 (Nigeria)	Final	2nd place							
1991 (France)	Final	2nd place							
1993 (Bulgaria)	Semi-finals	3rd place							
1995 (Brazil)	Semi-finals	4th place							
1997 (Ivory Coast)	Quarter-finals	5th place							
1999 (China)	Eight-finals	9th place							
2001 (Hungary)	Eight-finals	9th place							
2003 (North Macedonia)	Eight-finals	9th place							
2005 (Czech Republic)	Semi-finals	3rd place							
2008 (North Macedonia)	Semi-finals	3rd place							
2010 (South Korea)	Semi-finals	4th place							
2012 (Czech Republic)	Quarter-finals	6th place							
2014 (Croatia)	Final	1st place							
2016 (Russia)	Quarter-finals	7th place							
2018 (Hungary)	Semi-finals	3rd place							
2022 (Slovenia)	Presidents Cup	19th place							
2024 (North Macedonia)	Presidents Cup	14th place							
2026 (China)	Presidents Cup	16th place							
Total	22/24	1 Title							
