= IHF Women's U20 Handball World Championship =

International women's youth handball tournament

- Upcoming season or competition: 2026 IHF Women's U20 Handball World Championship
- Sport: Handball
- Founded: 1977
- Founder: International Handball Federation
- First season: 1977
- No. of teams: 24
- Continents: 5
- Most recent champion: Germany (2nd title)
- Most titles: Soviet Union (7 titles)

The IHF Women's U20 Handball World Championship (or the IHF Women's Junior World Championship) is the official competition for women's national handball teams under age 20, has been organized by the International Handball Federation since 1977. It takes place every two years in even years.

== Tournaments ==
Year	Host country	Gold medal game			Bronze medal game		
Year	Host country	Gold	Score	Silver	Bronze	Score	Fourth place
1977; Details	Romania	Yugoslavia	16–13; OT	Soviet Union	Romania	16–15; 3OT	East Germany
1979; Details	(Socialist Federal Republic of Yugoslavia); Yugoslavia	Soviet Union	No playoffs	East Germany	Yugoslavia	No playoffs	Hungary
1981; Details	Canada	Soviet Union	No playoffs	Yugoslavia	West Germany	No playoffs	South Korea
1983; Details	France	Soviet Union	22–17	East Germany	South Korea	26–23	Yugoslavia
1985; Details	South Korea	Soviet Union	27–24	South Korea	Poland	30–29; 2OT	East Germany
1987; Details	Denmark	Soviet Union	24–15	Denmark	East Germany	27–23	South Korea
1989; Details	Nigeria	Soviet Union	26–23	South Korea	Bulgaria	27–18	Yugoslavia
1991; Details	France	Soviet Union	26–25	South Korea	Denmark	25–18	Sweden
1993; Details	Bulgaria	Russia	24–17	Bulgaria	South Korea	28–27	Denmark
1995; Details	Brazil	Romania	28–24	Denmark	Norway	26–24	South Korea
1997; Details	Ivory Coast	Denmark	29–26	Russia	Romania	27–26	Norway
1999; Details	China	Romania	25–20	Lithuania	Denmark	25–20	Hungary
2001; Details	Hungary	Russia	29–27	Hungary	Germany	26–22	Spain
2003; Details	North Macedonia	Russia	26–24	Hungary	Norway	35–30	Croatia
2005; Details	Czech Republic	Russia	30–25	Norway	South Korea	28–23	Hungary
2008; Details	North Macedonia	Germany	23–22	Denmark	South Korea	29–22	Spain
2010; Details	South Korea	Norway	30–21	Russia	Montenegro	24–23	South Korea
2012; Details	Czech Republic	Sweden	29–22	France	Hungary	26–24	Serbia
2014; Details	Croatia	South Korea	34–27	Russia	Denmark	21–20	Germany
2016; Details	Russia	Denmark	32–28; OT	Russia	Romania	26–25	Germany
2018; Details	Hungary	Hungary	28–22	Norway	South Korea	29–27	Russia
2020; Details	Romania	Cancelled due to the COVID-19 pandemic					
2022; Details	Slovenia	Norway	31–29	Hungary	Netherlands	31–20	Sweden
2024; Details	North Macedonia	France	29–26	Hungary	Netherlands	34–28	Denmark
2026; Details	China	Germany	33–26	Denmark	France	24–21	Spain

== Medal table ==
Rank	Nation	Gold	Silver	Bronze	Total
1	Soviet Union	7	1	0	8
2	Russia	4	4	0	8
3	Denmark	2	4	3	9
4	Norway	2	2	2	6
5	Romania	2	0	3	5
6	Germany	2	0	1	3
7	Hungary	1	4	1	6
8	South Korea	1	3	5	9
9	France	1	1	1	3
9	Yugoslavia	1	1	1	3
11	Sweden	1	0	0	1
12	East Germany	0	2	1	3
13	Bulgaria	0	1	1	2
14	Lithuania	0	1	0	1
15	Netherlands	0	0	2	2
16	Montenegro	0	0	1	1
16	Poland	0	0	1	1
16	West Germany	0	0	1	1
Totals (18 entries)		24	24	24	72

== Participating nations ==
Nation	(Romania) 1977	(Socialist Federal Republic of Yugoslavia) 1979	(Canada) 1981	(France) 1983	(South Korea) 1985	(Denmark) 1987	(Nigeria) 1989	(France) 1991	(Bulgaria) 1993	(Brazil) 1995	(Ivory Coast) 1997	(China) 1999	(Hungary) 2001	(North Macedonia) 2003	(Czech Republic) 2005	(North Macedonia) 2008	(South Korea) 2010	(Czech Republic) 2012	(Croatia) 2014	(Russia) 2016	(Hungary) 2018	(Romania) ~~2020~~	(Slovenia) 2022	(North Macedonia) 2024	(China) 2026	Years
Algeria	-	-	-	-	-	-	12th	-	16th	-	-	-	-	19th	-	16th	-	-	-	-	-	-	-	31st	24th	6
Angola	-	-	-	-	-	-	-	-	-	13th	17th	17th	15th	-	15th	11th	14th	19th	21st	14th	19th	-	6th	18th	22nd	14
Argentina	-	-	-	-	-	-	-	-	-	17th	-	-	16th	-	20th	12th	15th	20th	20th	16th	-	-	25th	21st	21st	11
Australia	-	-	-	-	-	-	-	-	-	-	-	-	-	-	-	20th	22nd	-	-	-	-	-	-	-	WD	2
Austria	14th	11th	-	-	14th	-	14th	14th	11th	-	-	-	-	-	-	-	-	11th	-	19th	-	-	24th	-	15th	10
Belarus	Part of Soviet Union								6th	-	-	-	-	-	-	-	-	-	-	-	-	-	-	-	-	1
Brazil	-	-	-	-	-	-	-	15th	13th	13th	12th	12th	13th	15th	9th	9th	12th	12th	15th	11th	11th	-	22nd	19th	20th	17
Bulgaria	-	-	-	5th	-	-	3rd	8th	2nd	9th	-	-	-	-	-	-	-	-	-	-	-	-	-	-	-	5
Canada	-	-	8th	-	-	-	-	OC	-	-	-	20th	-	-	-	-	-	-	-	-	-	-	-	-	31st	3
Chile	-	-	-	-	-	-	-	-	-	-	-	-	-	-	-	-	-	-	-	22nd	20th	-	27th	29th	-	4
China	-	-	6th	13th	6th	7th	6th	10th	15th	17th	14th	10th	17th	16th	13th	-	17th	22nd	19th	18th	21st	-	-	15th	14th	20
Chinese Taipei	-	-	-	-	-	-	-	11th	-	-	-	16th	19th	-	-	17th	-	-	-	-	-	-	-	26th	30th	6
Congo	12th	-	-	-	-	-	-	-	-	-	-	15th	-	14th	-	-	-	16th	-	-	-	-	-	-	-	4
Congo DR	-	-	-	-	-	-	-	-	-	-	-	-	-	-	-	-	23rd	-	24th	-	-	-	-	-	-	2
Croatia	Part of Yugoslavia								-	13th	-	-	10th	4th	7th	6th	11th	10th	10th	8th	9th	-	12th	-	17th	12
Czech Republic	Part of Czechoslovakia								-	11th	-	-	-	12th	16th	-	-	15th	11th	-	-	-	11th	25th	12th	8
Denmark	10th	5th	5th	10th	11th	2nd	7th	3rd	4th	2nd	1st	3rd	7th	7th	5th	2nd	-	9th	3rd	1st	6th	-	5th	4th	2nd	23
Egypt	-	-	-	-	-	-	-	-	-	-	-	-	-	-	-	-	-	-	-	20th	23rd	-	15th	13th	18th	5
Faroe Islands	-	-	-	-	-	-	-	-	-	-	-	-	-	-	-	-	-	-	-	-	-	-	-	-	23rd	1
France	13th	6th	7th	8th	10th	9th	-	12th	-	5th	9th	-	-	-	17th	7th	13th	2nd	5th	13th	7th	-	13th	1st	3rd	19
Germany	See East Germany & West Germany							6th	10th	7th	-	-	3rd	5th	-	1st	7th	-	4th	4th	13th	-	7th	9th	1st	13
Greenland	-	-	-	-	-	-	-	-	-	-	-	-	-	-	-	-	21st	-	-	-	-	-	-	-	-	1
Guinea	-	-	-	-	-	-	-	-	-	-	-	-	-	-	-	-	-	-	-	-	-	-	23rd	23rd	28th	3
Hong Kong	-	-	-	-	-	-	-	-	-	-	-	-	-	-	-	-	24th	-	-	-	-	-	-	-	-	1
Hungary	6th	4th	-	-	-	-	-	-	-	-	10th	4th	2nd	2nd	4th	5th	5th	3rd	7th	10th	1st	-	2nd	2nd	13th	16
Iceland	-	-	-	-	-	-	-	-	-	-	-	18th	-	-	-	13th	-	-	-	-	10th	-	-	7th	19th	5
India	-	-	-	-	-	-	-	-	-	-	-	-	-	-	-	-	-	-	-	-	-	-	26th	-	32nd	2
Iran	-	-	-	-	-	-	-	-	-	-	-	-	-	-	-	-	-	-	-	-	-	-	30th	27th	-	2
Italy	-	13th	10th	16th	-	-	-	-	-	-	-	-	-	-	-	-	-	-	-	-	-	-	29th	-	-	4
Ivory Coast	-	-	-	14th	-	-	-	-	-	-	16th	-	-	-	-	-	-	-	-	-	WD	-	-	-	-	2
Japan	-	10th	-	15th	12th	15th	10th	13th	12th	12th	8th	19th	20th	17th	10th	14th	16th	21st	17th	15th	14th	-	9th	20th	7th	22
Kazakhstan	Part of Soviet Union								-	-	-	-	-	-	-	19th	-	24th	23rd	23rd	-	-	28th	-	-	5
Lithuania	Part of Soviet Union								-	-	-	2nd	-	-	14th	-	-	-	-	-	-	-	21st	-	-	3
Mexico	-	-	-	-	-	-	-	-	-	-	-	-	-	-	-	-	18th	-	-	-	-	-	32nd	32nd	-	3
Montenegro	Part of Yugoslavia								Part of Serbia and Montenegro							8th	3rd	-	-	17th	16th	-	10th	12th	5th	7
Netherlands	9th	8th	9th	11th	13th	-	-	-	-	10th	-	13th	18th	-	-	-	6th	17th	8th	9th	5th	-	3rd	3rd	-	15
New Zealand	-	-	-	-	-	-	-	-	-	-	-	-	-	-	-	-	-	-	-	-	-	-	-	WD	-	0
Nigeria	-	-	-	-	-	14th	9th	OC	-	-	-	-	-	-	-	-	-	-	-	-	-	-	-	-	-	2
North Korea	-	-	-	-	-	-	-	-	14th	-	-	-	-	-	-	-	-	-	-	-	-	-	-	-	-	1
North Macedonia	Part of Yugoslavia								-	17th	-	-	-	8th	-	18th	-	-	-	-	-	-	-	16th	-	4
Norway	7th	7th	-	9th	5th	8th	-	-	-	3rd	4th	7th	6th	3rd	2nd	-	1st	8th	9th	5th	2nd	-	1st	10th	8th	19
Paraguay	-	-	-	-	-	-	-	-	-	-	-	-	-	-	-	-	-	-	-	-	22nd	-	WD	-	26th	2
Poland	5th	-	-	7th	3rd	13th	-	-	8th	-	-	-	-	13th	8th	-	-	7th	-	-	-	-	17th	-	10th	10
Portugal	-	-	-	-	-	-	-	-	-	-	6th	-	-	10th	-	-	-	-	16th	-	18th	-	-	5th	-	5
Romania	3rd	-	-	-	7th	-	-	5th	5th	1st	3rd	1st	5th	11th	-	10th	-	13th	6th	3rd	8th	-	18th	11th	11th	17
Russia	Part of Soviet Union								1st	8th	2nd	5th	1st	1st	1st	-	2nd	5th	2nd	2nd	4th	-	DQ	-	-	12
Serbia	Part of Yugoslavia								Part of Serbia and Montenegro							-	9th	4th	12th	-	-	-	-	22nd	6th	5
Slovakia	Part of Czechoslovakia								-	13th	7th	14th	-	-	-	-	-	-	-	-	-	-	20th	-	-	4
Slovenia	Part of Yugoslavia								-	-	13th	-	-	-	-	15th	-	-	14th	-	15th	-	14th	-	-	5
South Korea	-	-	4th	3rd	2nd	4th	2nd	2nd	3rd	4th	5th	9th	9th	9th	3rd	3rd	4th	6th	1st	7th	3rd	-	19th	14th	16th	22
Spain	-	-	-	-	15th	11th	8th	-	-	-	-	6th	4th	-	11th	4th	10th	14th	-	12th	17th	-	-	17th	4th	13
Sweden	-	-	-	6th	-	10th	5th	4th	9th	-	-	-	8th	6th	18th	-	8th	1st	13th	6th	12th	-	4th	6th	9th	16
Switzerland	-	-	-	-	-	-	13th	-	-	-	15th	-	-	-	-	-	-	-	-	-	-	-	8th	8th	-	4
Thailand	-	-	-	-	-	-	-	-	-	-	-	-	-	-	-	-	20th	-	-	-	-	-	-	-	-	1
Tunisia	-	-	-	-	-	-	-	-	-	-	-	-	14th	-	19th	-	19th	23rd	22nd	21st	-	-	16th	24th	27th	9
Turkey	-	-	-	-	-	-	15th	-	-	-	11th	11th	11th	-	-	-	-	-	-	-	-	-	-	-	25th	5
Ukraine	Part of Soviet Union								7th	6th	-	-	-	-	12th	-	-	-	-	-	-	-	-	-	-	3
United States	-	12th	11th	-	-	-	-	-	-	-	-	-	-	-	-	-	-	-	-	-	-	-	31st	30th	29th	5
Uruguay	-	-	-	-	-	-	-	-	-	17th	-	-	-	20th	-	-	-	18th	18th	-	-	-	-	-	-	4
Uzbekistan	Part of Soviet Union								-	-	-	-	-	-	-	-	-	-	-	24th	-	-	-	28th	-	2
Discontinued teams
Czechoslovakia	8th	-	-	-	-	6th	-	7th	See Czech Republic and Slovakia																	3
East Germany	4th	2nd	-	2nd	4th	3rd	-	See Germany																		5
Serbia and Montenegro	Part of Yugoslavia								-	-	-	8th	12th	18th	6th	See Montenegro and Serbia										4
Soviet Union	2nd	1st	1st	1st	1st	1st	1st	1st	See Belarus, Kazakhstan, Lithuania, Russia, Ukraine and Uzbekistan																	8
West Germany	11th	9th	3rd	12th	9th	12th	11th	See Germany																		7
Yugoslavia	1st	3rd	2nd	4th	8th	5th	4th	9th	See Croatia, North Macedonia, Serbia and Montenegro (Today Montenegro & Serbia) and Slovenia																	8
Total (62)	14	13	11	16	15	15	15	16	16	20	17	20	20	20	20	20	24	24	24	24	23	24	32	32	32	

== See also ==
- IHF Women's U18 Handball World Championship
