= Iceland women's national junior handball team =

Iceland

Information
- Association: Icelandic Handball Federation
- Coach: Halldór Haraldsson

Colours
| 1st | 2nd |

Results

IHF U-20 World Championship
- Appearances: 5 (First in 1999)
- Best result: 7th (2024)
- Last updated on Unknown.

The Iceland women's junior national handball team is the national under-19 handball team of Iceland. Controlled by the Icelandic Handball Federation it represents the country in international matches.

== World Championship record ==
- 1999 – 18th place
- 2008 – 13th place
- 2018 – 10th place
- 2024 – 7th place
- 2026 – 19th place
