= Yugoslavia women's national junior handball team =

The Yugoslavia women's national junior handball team was the national under-20 handball team of Yugoslavia.

They were the junior branch of the Yugoslavia women's national handball team. They won the 1977 Women's Junior World Handball Championship, a bronze in 1979 in Yugoslavia, and a silver in 1981 in Canada. At the 1983 Women's Junior World Handball Championship in France they lost the bronze medal game to South Korea. They finished fourth at the 1989 Women's Junior World Handball Championship in Nigeria, losing the bronze medal game to Bulgaria.
