= Czech Republic women's national junior handball team =

Czech Republic

Information
- Association: Czech Handball Association
- Coach: Dušan Poloz

Colours
1st	2nd

Results

IHF U-20 World Championship
- Appearances: 8 (First in 1995)
- Best result: 11th (2014, 2022)
- Last updated on Unknown.

The Czech Republic women's junior national handball team is the national under-19 handball team of the Czech Republic. Controlled by the Czech Handball Association it represents the country in international matches.

== World Championship record ==
- 1995 – 13th place
- 2003 – 12th place
- 2005 – 15th place
- 2012 – 15th place
- 2014 – 11th place
- 2022 – 11th place
- 2024 – 25th place
- 2026 – 12th place
