= Manon Errard =

French handball player (born 2005)

Personal information
- Full name: Manon Errard
- Nationality: French
- Born: 9 February 2005 (age 21) Nouméa, New Caledonia
- Height: 1.78 m (5 ft 10 in)

Sport
- Sport: Handball
- Position: Right wing
- Current club: Metz Handball
- Number: 98

Senior clubs
- Years: Team
- 2024–: Metz Handball
National team
Years	Team	Apps	(Gls)
2025–	France	3	(5)

Manon Errard (born 9 February 2005) is a French professional handballer for Metz Handball in the LFH Division 1 Féminine and the French national team.

Errard won gold at the 2024 IHF Women's U20 Handball World Championship in North Macedonia. She made her international debut on the French national team on 6 March 2025 against Germany. She was also included in the official All-Star team of the tournament as best right winger.

On 11 December 2024, she signed a three-year contract with French powerhouse Metz Handball.

== Achievements ==
- Women's EHF Champions League:
  - Winner: 2026
- French Women's First League Championship:
  - Winner: 2025
  - Silver Medalist: 2026
- French Women's Cup Championship:
  - Winner: 2025
