= Switzerland women's national junior handball team =

Switzerland

Information
- Association: Swiss Handball Association
- Coach: Manuel Schnellmann

Colours
1st	2nd

Results

IHF U-20 World Championship
- Appearances: 4 (First in 1989)
- Best result: 8th (2022)
- Last updated on Unknown.

The Switzerland women's junior national handball team is the national under-19 handball team of Switzerland. Controlled by the Swiss Handball Association it represents the country in international matches.

== World Championship results ==
- 1989 – 13th place
- 1997 – 15th place
- 2022 – 8th place
- 2024 – 8th place
