= Netherlands women's national junior handball team =

Netherlands

Information
- Association: Netherlands Handball Association
- Coach: Ricardo Clarijs

Colours
1st	2nd

Results

IHF U-20 World Championship
- Appearances: 15 (First in 1977)
- Best result: Third place (2010, 2022, 2024)

European Junior Championship
- Appearances: 7 (First in 1998)
- Best result: (silver) Runners up (2011)
- Last updated on Unknown.

The Netherlands women's junior national handball team is the national under-19 handball team of the Netherlands. Controlled by the Netherlands Handball Association it represents the Netherlands in international matches.

== History ==
=== World Championship ===
Champions Runners up Third place Fourth place

IHF Junior World Championship record
Year	Round	Position	GP	W	D	L	GS	GA	GD
(Romania) 1977	Preliminary Round	9th							
(Socialist Federal Republic of Yugoslavia) 1979	Quarterfinals	7th							
(Canada) 1981	Preliminary Round	9th							
(France) 1983	Preliminary Round	11th							
(South Korea) 1985	Preliminary Round	13th							
(Denmark) 1987	Didn't Qualify								
(Nigeria) 1989	Didn't Qualify								
(France) 1991	Didn't Qualify								
(Bulgaria) 1993	Didn't Qualify								
(Brazil) 1995	Eightfinals	10th							
(Ivory Coast) 1997	Didn't Qualify								
(China) 1999	Preliminary Round	13th							
(Hungary) 2001	Preliminary Round	18th							
(North Macedonia) 2003	Didn't Qualify								
(Czech Republic) 2005	Didn't Qualify								
(North Macedonia) 2008	Didn't Qualify								
(South Korea) 2010	Quarterfinals	6th							
(Czech Republic) 2012	Preliminary Round	17th							
(Croatia) 2014	Quarterfinals	8th							
(Russia) 2016	Eightfinals	9th							
(Hungary) 2018	Quarterfinals	5th							
(Slovenia) 2022	Semifinals	3rd							
(North Macedonia) 2024	Semifinals	3rd							
Total	15/23	0 Titles							

=== European Championship ===
Champions Runners up Third place Fourth place

European Junior Championship record
Year	Round	Position	GP	W	D	L	GS	GA	GD
(Poland) 1996	Didn't Qualify								
(Slovakia) 1998	Preliminary Round	11th	6	1	0	5	135	158	–23
(France) 2000	Didn't Qualify								
(Finland) 2002	Semifinals	4th	6	3	0	3	149	172	–23
(Czech Republic) 2004	Didn't Qualify								
(Turkey) 2007	Preliminary Round	11th	7	3	1	3	200	201	–1
(Hungary) 2009	Second Round	8th	7	3	1	3	195	197	–2
(Netherlands) 2011	Final	2nd	7	6	0	1	237	191	+46
(Denmark) 2013	Second Round	6th	7	5	0	2	204	196	+8
(Spain) 2015	Didn't Qualify								
(Slovenia) 2017	Second Round	6th	8	3	0	5	213	224	–11
(Hungary) 2019	Final	2nd	7	5		2			
Total	8/12	0 Titles	48	24	2	22	1333	1339	–6
