= 2024 IHF Women's U20 Handball World Championship =

IHF Women's U20 Handball World Championship

Tournament details
- Host country: North Macedonia
- Venues: 2 (in 1 host city)
- Dates: 19–30 June
- Teams: 32 (from 5 confederations)

Final positions
- Champions: France (1st title)
- Runners-up: Hungary
- Third place: Netherlands
- Fourth place: Denmark

Tournament statistics
- Matches played: 116
- Goals scored: 6,386 (55.05 per match)
- Top scorers: (Montenegro) Jelena Vukčević (74 goals)

Awards
- Best player: (France) Lylou Borg

The 2024 IHF Women's U20 Handball World Championship was the 24th edition of the IHF Women's U20 Handball World Championship, held in North Macedonia from 19 to 30 June 2024 under the aegis of International Handball Federation (IHF).

France won their first title by defeating Hungary in the final.

== Bidding process ==
Two nations entered bid for hosting the tournament:

- North Macedonia
- Slovenia

Slovenia later withdrew their bid. The tournament was awarded to North Macedonia by IHF Council in its meeting held in Cairo, Egypt on 28 February 2020.

== Venues ==
The matches were played in Skopje. The Jane Sandanski Arena had a smaller hall which was used as well.

Skopje	2024 IHF Women's U20 Handball World Championship is located in North Macedonia	Skopje
Boris Trajkovski Sports Center; Capacity: 10,000	2024 IHF Women's U20 Handball World Championship is located in North Macedonia	Jane Sandanski Arena; Capacity: 6,500

== Qualification ==
Qualification	Dates	Host	Vacancies	Qualified
Host			1	North Macedonia
2023 Asian Junior Championship	30 June – 9 July 2023	(Hong Kong) Tsim Sha Tsui	5	China; Chinese Taipei; Iran; Japan; South Korea
2023 U-19 European Championship	6–16 July 2023	Romania	13	Czech Republic; Denmark; France; Germany; Hungary; Iceland; Montenegro; Netherlands; Norway; Portugal; Romania; Sweden; Switzerland
2023 African Junior Championship	7–14 September 2023	(Tunisia) Monastir	5	Algeria; Angola; Egypt; Guinea; Tunisia
IHF Trophy U19 – Oceania	16–20 October 2023	(New Caledonia) Nouméa	1	unoccupied
2023 South and Central American Junior Championship	14–18 November 2023	(Argentina) Buenos Aires	3	Argentina; Brazil; Chile
European qualification	21–26 November 2023	(Serbia) Vrnjačka Banja	1	Spain
2023 IHF Trophy U19 – North America and the Caribbean	9–13 December 2023	Mexico City	2	Mexico; United States
2024 IHF Inter-Continental Trophy	28 February – 3 March 2024	(Uzbekistan) Tashkent	1	Uzbekistan
Replacement			1	Serbia

== Draw ==
The draw was held on 13 April 2024 in Ulm, Germany.

=== Seeding ===
Pot 1	Pot 2	Pot 3	Pot 4
Hungary; Denmark; Romania; Portugal; Sweden; Angola; France; Switzerland	South Korea; Montenegro; Netherlands; Norway; North Macedonia; Germany; Czech Republic; Egypt	Guinea; Iceland; Spain; China; Argentina; Tunisia; Brazil; Japan	Chile; Chinese Taipei; Iran; Mexico; United States; Algeria; Serbia; Uzbekistan

- The spot for Oceania was left unoccupied and a replacement nation was named.

== Referees ==
The referees were announced on 26 April 2024.

Referees
Argentina	Mariana García; María Paolantoni
Bosnia and Herzegovina	Vesna Balvan; Tatjana Praštalo
Brazil	Bruna Correa; Renata Correa
Croatia	Ante Mikelić; Petar Parađina
Cuba	Raymel Reyes; Alexis Zuñiga
Denmark	Jacob Pagh; Karl Thygesen
Egypt	Heidy El-Saied; Yasmina El-Saied
France	Yann Camaux; Julien Mursch
Germany	Ramesh Thiyagarajah; Suresh Thiyagarajah
Hungary	Rita Dáné; Zsófia Marton
Iran	Marzieh Ghofli; Mozhgan Hassanzadeh

Referees
Iran	Amir Gheisarian; Ahmad Gheisarian
Kuwait	Maali Al-Enezi; Dalal Al-Nassem
Montenegro	Novica Mitrović; Miljan Vešović
North Macedonia	Danielo Bozhinovski; Viktor Nachevski
Norway	Eskil Braseth; Leif André Sundet
Romania	Cristina Lovin; Simona Stancu
Saudi Arabia	Mohammed Al-Saqer; Ali Al-Suqufi
Serbia	Marko Sekulić; Vladimir Jovandić
Slovakia	Andrej Budzák; Michal Záhradník
Slovenia	Žan Pukšič; Miha Satler
Spain	Jesús Álvarez; Miguel Soria

== Preliminary round ==
All times are local (UTC+2).

=== Group A ===
Pos	Team	Pld	W	D	L	GF	GA	GD	Pts	Qualification
1	Netherlands	3	3	0	0	95	56	+39	6	Main round
2	Romania	3	2	0	1	85	69	+16	4	Main round
3	Brazil	3	1	0	2	74	80	−6	2	Presidents Cup
4	Iran	3	0	0	3	26	67	−41	0	Presidents Cup

Source: IHF
Rules for classification: 1) points; 2) head-to-head points; 3) head-to-head goal difference; 4) head-to-head number of goals scored; 5) goal difference.

19 June 2024; 11:15	Romania	26–25	Brazil	Boris Trajkovski Sports Center, Skopje; Attendance: 104; Referees: Thiyagarajah, Thiyagarajah (GER)
19 June 2024; 11:15	Boiciuc 11	(13–13)	De Souza 7	Boris Trajkovski Sports Center, Skopje; Attendance: 104; Referees: Thiyagarajah, Thiyagarajah (GER)
19 June 2024; 11:15	1× (yellow card) 3× (suspension)	Report	6× (suspension)	Boris Trajkovski Sports Center, Skopje; Attendance: 104; Referees: Thiyagarajah, Thiyagarajah (GER)

19 June 2024; 13:30	Netherlands	34–11	Iran	Boris Trajkovski Sports Center, Skopje; Attendance: 80; Referees: Mitrović, Vešović (MNE)
19 June 2024; 13:30	Horvers 7	(16–3)	Koudzari 6	Boris Trajkovski Sports Center, Skopje; Attendance: 80; Referees: Mitrović, Vešović (MNE)
19 June 2024; 13:30	2× (yellow card) 2× (suspension)	Report	1× (suspension)	Boris Trajkovski Sports Center, Skopje; Attendance: 80; Referees: Mitrović, Vešović (MNE)

20 June 2024; 15:45	Iran	15–33	Romania	Jane Sandanski Arena, Skopje; Attendance: 50; Referees: Balvan, Praštalo (BIH)
20 June 2024; 15:45	Nikan 4	(7–16)	Raicea 6	Jane Sandanski Arena, Skopje; Attendance: 50; Referees: Balvan, Praštalo (BIH)
20 June 2024; 15:45	3× (suspension)	Report	3× (suspension)	Jane Sandanski Arena, Skopje; Attendance: 50; Referees: Balvan, Praštalo (BIH)

20 June 2024; 18:00	Netherlands	32–19	Brazil	Jane Sandanski Arena, Skopje; Attendance: 100; Referees: Sekulić, Jovandić (SRB)
20 June 2024; 18:00	Van Maurik 8	(13–8)	De Souza, Rodrigues 4	Jane Sandanski Arena, Skopje; Attendance: 100; Referees: Sekulić, Jovandić (SRB)
20 June 2024; 18:00	4× (suspension)	Report	4× (suspension)	Jane Sandanski Arena, Skopje; Attendance: 100; Referees: Sekulić, Jovandić (SRB)

22 June 2024; 13:30	Brazil	30–22	Iran	Jane Sandanski Arena, Skopje; Attendance: 76; Referees: Soria, Pukšič
22 June 2024; 13:30	Borne, Dos Santos 7	(11–10)	Merikh 9	Jane Sandanski Arena, Skopje; Attendance: 76; Referees: Soria, Pukšič
22 June 2024; 13:30	1× (suspension)	Report	4× (suspension)	Jane Sandanski Arena, Skopje; Attendance: 76; Referees: Soria, Pukšič

22 June 2024; 15:45	Romania	26–29	Netherlands	Jane Sandanski Arena, Skopje; Attendance: 66; Referees: García, Paolantoni (ARG)
22 June 2024; 15:45	Lixăndroiu 6	(14–16)	three players 6	Jane Sandanski Arena, Skopje; Attendance: 66; Referees: García, Paolantoni (ARG)
22 June 2024; 15:45	2× (suspension)	Report	4× (suspension)	Jane Sandanski Arena, Skopje; Attendance: 66; Referees: García, Paolantoni (ARG)

=== Group B ===
Pos	Team	Pld	W	D	L	GF	GA	GD	Pts	Qualification
1	Switzerland	3	3	0	0	112	59	+53	6	Main round
2	Egypt	3	2	0	1	73	71	+2	4	Main round
3	Tunisia	3	1	0	2	96	87	+9	2	Presidents Cup
4	Chile	3	0	0	3	55	119	−64	0	Presidents Cup

Source: IHF
Rules for classification: 1) points; 2) head-to-head points; 3) head-to-head goal difference; 4) head-to-head number of goals scored; 5) goal difference.

19 June 2024; 10:00	Switzerland	34–26	Tunisia	Jane Sandanski Arena 2, Skopje; Referees: Sekulić, Jovandić (SRB)
19 June 2024; 10:00	Albrecht, Riner 10	(20–11)	three players 4	Jane Sandanski Arena 2, Skopje; Referees: Sekulić, Jovandić (SRB)
19 June 2024; 10:00	1× (suspension)	Report	4× (suspension)	Jane Sandanski Arena 2, Skopje; Referees: Sekulić, Jovandić (SRB)

19 June 2024; 13:00	Egypt	26–16	Chile	Jane Sandanski Arena 2, Skopje; Attendance: 35; Referees: Pukšič, Satler (SLO)
19 June 2024; 13:00	Hatem 5	(12–7)	Paul 5	Jane Sandanski Arena 2, Skopje; Attendance: 35; Referees: Pukšič, Satler (SLO)
19 June 2024; 13:00	1× (yellow card) 3× (suspension)	Report	5× (suspension)	Jane Sandanski Arena 2, Skopje; Attendance: 35; Referees: Pukšič, Satler (SLO)

20 June 2024; 11:15	Chile	11–47	Switzerland	Boris Trajkovski Sports Center, Skopje; Attendance: 63; Referees: Mitrović, Vešović (MNE)
20 June 2024; 11:15	Riquelme 4	(6–27)	Schläpfer 8	Boris Trajkovski Sports Center, Skopje; Attendance: 63; Referees: Mitrović, Vešović (MNE)
20 June 2024; 11:15	3× (suspension)	Report	1× (yellow card) 1× (suspension)	Boris Trajkovski Sports Center, Skopje; Attendance: 63; Referees: Mitrović, Vešović (MNE)

20 June 2024; 11:15	Egypt	25–24	Tunisia	Jane Sandanski Arena, Skopje; Attendance: 66; Referees: Camaux, Mursch (FRA)
20 June 2024; 11:15	Omar 10	(13–13)	Rmiza 9	Jane Sandanski Arena, Skopje; Attendance: 66; Referees: Camaux, Mursch (FRA)
20 June 2024; 11:15	6× (suspension)	Report	6× (suspension)	Jane Sandanski Arena, Skopje; Attendance: 66; Referees: Camaux, Mursch (FRA)

22 June 2024; 09:00	Switzerland	31–22	Egypt	Jane Sandanski Arena, Skopje; Attendance: 55; Referees: Bozhinovski, Nachevski (MKD)
22 June 2024; 09:00	Bucher 8	(15–14)	Osama 10	Jane Sandanski Arena, Skopje; Attendance: 55; Referees: Bozhinovski, Nachevski (MKD)
22 June 2024; 09:00	4× (suspension)	Report	4× (suspension)	Jane Sandanski Arena, Skopje; Attendance: 55; Referees: Bozhinovski, Nachevski (MKD)

22 June 2024; 13:00	Tunisia	46–28	Chile	Jane Sandanski Arena 2, Skopje; Attendance: 20; Referees: Balvan, Praštalo (BIH)
22 June 2024; 13:00	Dabbabi 13	(22–13)	Riquelme 6	Jane Sandanski Arena 2, Skopje; Attendance: 20; Referees: Balvan, Praštalo (BIH)
22 June 2024; 13:00	4× (suspension)	Report	4× (suspension)	Jane Sandanski Arena 2, Skopje; Attendance: 20; Referees: Balvan, Praštalo (BIH)

=== Group C ===
Pos	Team	Pld	W	D	L	GF	GA	GD	Pts	Qualification
1	Hungary	3	3	0	0	125	48	+77	6	Main round
2	South Korea	3	2	0	1	83	83	0	4	Main round
3	Argentina	3	1	0	2	93	88	+5	2	Presidents Cup
4	Mexico	3	0	0	3	46	128	−82	0	Presidents Cup

Source: IHF
Rules for classification: 1) points; 2) head-to-head points; 3) head-to-head goal difference; 4) head-to-head number of goals scored; 5) goal difference.

19 June 2024; 09:00	Hungary	39–21	Argentina	Jane Sandanski Arena, Skopje; Attendance: 56; Referees: Bozhinovski, Nachevski (MKD)
19 June 2024; 09:00	three players 6	(19–12)	Gull 7	Jane Sandanski Arena, Skopje; Attendance: 56; Referees: Bozhinovski, Nachevski (MKD)
19 June 2024; 09:00	5× (suspension)	Report	2× (suspension)	Jane Sandanski Arena, Skopje; Attendance: 56; Referees: Bozhinovski, Nachevski (MKD)

19 June 2024; 09:00	South Korea	33–20	Mexico	Boris Trajkovski Sports Center, Skopje; Attendance: 50; Referees: Awwad, Al-Zayyat (JOR)
19 June 2024; 09:00	Cha 8	(17–9)	Campos, Verdugo 4	Boris Trajkovski Sports Center, Skopje; Attendance: 50; Referees: Awwad, Al-Zayyat (JOR)
19 June 2024; 09:00	2× (suspension)	Report	5× (suspension)	Boris Trajkovski Sports Center, Skopje; Attendance: 50; Referees: Awwad, Al-Zayyat (JOR)

20 June 2024; 13:30	South Korea	33–31	Argentina	Jane Sandanski Arena, Skopje; Attendance: 86; Referees: Al-Enezi, Al-Nassem (KUW)
20 June 2024; 13:30	Park Su. 8	(17–16)	Kruk 11	Jane Sandanski Arena, Skopje; Attendance: 86; Referees: Al-Enezi, Al-Nassem (KUW)
20 June 2024; 13:30	2× (yellow card) 3× (suspension)	Report	3× (suspension)	Jane Sandanski Arena, Skopje; Attendance: 86; Referees: Al-Enezi, Al-Nassem (KUW)

20 June 2024; 13:30	Mexico	10–54	Hungary	Boris Trajkovski Sports Center, Skopje; Attendance: 78; Referees: Gheisarian, Gheisarian (IRI)
20 June 2024; 13:30	Mata, Virgen 4	(3–26)	Gém, Vártok 8	Boris Trajkovski Sports Center, Skopje; Attendance: 78; Referees: Gheisarian, Gheisarian (IRI)
20 June 2024; 13:30	3× (suspension)	Report	1× (suspension)	Boris Trajkovski Sports Center, Skopje; Attendance: 78; Referees: Gheisarian, Gheisarian (IRI)

22 June 2024; 11:15	Argentina	41–16	Mexico	Boris Trajkovski Sports Center, Skopje; Attendance: 41; Referees: Ghofli, Hassanzadeh (IRI)
22 June 2024; 11:15	Cabaña 9	(18–5)	Virgen 4	Boris Trajkovski Sports Center, Skopje; Attendance: 41; Referees: Ghofli, Hassanzadeh (IRI)
22 June 2024; 11:15	1× (suspension)	Report	2× (suspension)	Boris Trajkovski Sports Center, Skopje; Attendance: 41; Referees: Ghofli, Hassanzadeh (IRI)

22 June 2024; 13:30	Hungary	32–17	South Korea	Boris Trajkovski Sports Center, Skopje; Attendance: 80; Referees: Sekulić, Jovandić (SRB)
22 June 2024; 13:30	Csernyánszki 7	(13–9)	Kim Ji-a 4	Boris Trajkovski Sports Center, Skopje; Attendance: 80; Referees: Sekulić, Jovandić (SRB)
22 June 2024; 13:30	4× (suspension)	Report	1× (yellow card)	Boris Trajkovski Sports Center, Skopje; Attendance: 80; Referees: Sekulić, Jovandić (SRB)

=== Group D ===
Pos	Team	Pld	W	D	L	GF	GA	GD	Pts	Qualification
1	Denmark	3	3	0	0	117	69	+48	6	Main round
2	Norway	3	2	0	1	95	75	+20	4	Main round
3	Japan	3	1	0	2	92	98	−6	2	Presidents Cup
4	Chinese Taipei	3	0	0	3	57	119	−62	0	Presidents Cup

Source: IHF
Rules for classification: 1) points; 2) head-to-head points; 3) head-to-head goal difference; 4) head-to-head number of goals scored; 5) goal difference.

19 June 2024; 15:45	Denmark	43–25	Japan	Boris Trajkovski Sports Center, Skopje; Attendance: 50; Referees: Budzák, Záhradník (SVK)
19 June 2024; 15:45	Bang 7	(22–12)	Koyama 6	Boris Trajkovski Sports Center, Skopje; Attendance: 50; Referees: Budzák, Záhradník (SVK)
19 June 2024; 15:45	1× (yellow card) 1× (suspension)	Report	1× (suspension)	Boris Trajkovski Sports Center, Skopje; Attendance: 50; Referees: Budzák, Záhradník (SVK)

19 June 2024; 18:00	Norway	35–18	Chinese Taipei	Boris Trajkovski Sports Center, Skopje; Attendance: 60; Referees: Ghofli, Hassanzadeh (IRI)
19 June 2024; 18:00	Jullumstrø, Mjøs 6	(17–12)	Chang Y. 7	Boris Trajkovski Sports Center, Skopje; Attendance: 60; Referees: Ghofli, Hassanzadeh (IRI)
19 June 2024; 18:00	4× (suspension)	Report	3× (suspension)	Boris Trajkovski Sports Center, Skopje; Attendance: 60; Referees: Ghofli, Hassanzadeh (IRI)

20 June 2024; 15:45	Chinese Taipei	19–41	Denmark	Boris Trajkovski Sports Center, Skopje; Attendance: 64; Referees: Awwad, Al-Zayyat (JOR)
20 June 2024; 15:45	Chang Y. 5	(10–27)	Vestergaard 11	Boris Trajkovski Sports Center, Skopje; Attendance: 64; Referees: Awwad, Al-Zayyat (JOR)
20 June 2024; 15:45	4× (suspension)	Report	4× (suspension)	Boris Trajkovski Sports Center, Skopje; Attendance: 64; Referees: Awwad, Al-Zayyat (JOR)

20 June 2024; 18:00	Norway	35–24	Japan	Boris Trajkovski Sports Center, Skopje; Attendance: 88; Referees: Correa, Correa (BRA)
20 June 2024; 18:00	Kamburce 7	(20–12)	Hokaguchi, Okumura 4	Boris Trajkovski Sports Center, Skopje; Attendance: 88; Referees: Correa, Correa (BRA)
20 June 2024; 18:00	3× (suspension)	Report		Boris Trajkovski Sports Center, Skopje; Attendance: 88; Referees: Correa, Correa (BRA)

22 June 2024; 09:00	Japan	43–20	Chinese Taipei	Boris Trajkovski Sports Center, Skopje; Attendance: 61; Referees: Al-Saqer, Al-Suqufi (KSA)
22 June 2024; 09:00	Hashimoto 9	(17–11)	Tien 5	Boris Trajkovski Sports Center, Skopje; Attendance: 61; Referees: Al-Saqer, Al-Suqufi (KSA)
22 June 2024; 09:00	4× (suspension)	Report	4× (suspension)	Boris Trajkovski Sports Center, Skopje; Attendance: 61; Referees: Al-Saqer, Al-Suqufi (KSA)

22 June 2024; 15:45	Denmark	33–25	Norway	Boris Trajkovski Sports Center, Skopje; Attendance: 151; Referees: Camaux, Mursch (FRA)
22 June 2024; 15:45	Vestergaard 9	(22–12)	Mjøs 6	Boris Trajkovski Sports Center, Skopje; Attendance: 151; Referees: Camaux, Mursch (FRA)
22 June 2024; 15:45	3× (suspension)	Report	1× (yellow card) 3× (suspension)	Boris Trajkovski Sports Center, Skopje; Attendance: 151; Referees: Camaux, Mursch (FRA)

=== Group E ===
Pos	Team	Pld	W	D	L	GF	GA	GD	Pts	Qualification
1	Sweden	3	3	0	0	104	61	+43	6	Main round
2	China	3	2	0	1	84	73	+11	4	Main round
3	Czech Republic	3	1	0	2	73	72	+1	2	Presidents Cup
4	Algeria	3	0	0	3	39	94	−55	0	Presidents Cup

Source: IHF
Rules for classification: 1) points; 2) head-to-head points; 3) head-to-head goal difference; 4) head-to-head number of goals scored; 5) goal difference.

19 June 2024; 13:30	Czech Republic	23–17	Algeria	Jane Sandanski Arena, Skopje; Attendance: 56; Referees: Balvan, Praštalo (BIH)
19 June 2024; 13:30	Behenská, Schreibmeierová 4	(12–11)	Fettani 6	Jane Sandanski Arena, Skopje; Attendance: 56; Referees: Balvan, Praštalo (BIH)
19 June 2024; 13:30	2× (yellow card) 2× (suspension)	Report	4× (suspension)	Jane Sandanski Arena, Skopje; Attendance: 56; Referees: Balvan, Praštalo (BIH)

19 June 2024; 15:45	Sweden	38–24	China	Jane Sandanski Arena, Skopje; Attendance: 75; Referees: Al-Saqer, Al-Suqufi (KSA)
19 June 2024; 15:45	Kylberg 6	(19–13)	Zhuang 8	Jane Sandanski Arena, Skopje; Attendance: 75; Referees: Al-Saqer, Al-Suqufi (KSA)
19 June 2024; 15:45	1× (yellow card) 3× (suspension)	Report	2× (suspension)	Jane Sandanski Arena, Skopje; Attendance: 75; Referees: Al-Saqer, Al-Suqufi (KSA)

21 June 2024; 13:30	Algeria	13–38	Sweden	Boris Trajkovski Sports Center, Skopje; Attendance: 73; Referees: Budzák, Záhradník (SVK)
21 June 2024; 13:30	Fettani, Yelles 3	(9–18)	three players 6	Boris Trajkovski Sports Center, Skopje; Attendance: 73; Referees: Budzák, Záhradník (SVK)
21 June 2024; 13:30	3× (suspension)	Report	1× (yellow card)	Boris Trajkovski Sports Center, Skopje; Attendance: 73; Referees: Budzák, Záhradník (SVK)

21 June 2024; 15:45	Czech Republic	26–27	China	Jane Sandanski Arena, Skopje; Attendance: 71; Referees: Pagh, Thygesen (DEN)
21 June 2024; 15:45	Řádová 6	(13–16)	Shi 7	Jane Sandanski Arena, Skopje; Attendance: 71; Referees: Pagh, Thygesen (DEN)
21 June 2024; 15:45	2× (yellow card) 3× (suspension)	Report	3× (suspension) 1× (red card)	Jane Sandanski Arena, Skopje; Attendance: 71; Referees: Pagh, Thygesen (DEN)

22 June 2024; 16:00	China	33–9	Algeria	Jane Sandanski Arena 2, Skopje; Attendance: 20; Referees: Mikelić, Parađina (CRO)
22 June 2024; 16:00	Wang J. 7	(19–5)	three players 2	Jane Sandanski Arena 2, Skopje; Attendance: 20; Referees: Mikelić, Parađina (CRO)
22 June 2024; 16:00	2× (suspension)	Report	3× (suspension)	Jane Sandanski Arena 2, Skopje; Attendance: 20; Referees: Mikelić, Parađina (CRO)

22 June 2024; 18:00	Sweden	28–24	Czech Republic	Boris Trajkovski Sports Center, Skopje; Attendance: 130; Referees: Reyes, Zuñiga (CUB)
22 June 2024; 18:00	Mihailovic 9	(17–14)	Vávrová 7	Boris Trajkovski Sports Center, Skopje; Attendance: 130; Referees: Reyes, Zuñiga (CUB)
22 June 2024; 18:00	1× (suspension)	Report	3× (suspension)	Boris Trajkovski Sports Center, Skopje; Attendance: 130; Referees: Reyes, Zuñiga (CUB)

=== Group F ===
Pos	Team	Pld	W	D	L	GF	GA	GD	Pts	Qualification
1	France	3	3	0	0	89	71	+18	6	Main round
2	Germany	3	2	0	1	95	74	+21	4	Main round
3	Spain	3	1	0	2	84	76	+8	2	Presidents Cup
4	Serbia	3	0	0	3	54	101	−47	0	Presidents Cup

Source: IHF
Rules for classification: 1) points; 2) head-to-head points; 3) head-to-head goal difference; 4) head-to-head number of goals scored; 5) goal difference.

19 June 2024; 18:00	Germany	39–18	Serbia	Jane Sandanski Arena, Skopje; Attendance: 86; Referees: García, Paolantoni (ARG)
19 June 2024; 18:00	Gaubatz 5	(18–7)	Radević 5	Jane Sandanski Arena, Skopje; Attendance: 86; Referees: García, Paolantoni (ARG)
19 June 2024; 18:00	1× (yellow card) 2× (suspension)	Report	2× (suspension)	Jane Sandanski Arena, Skopje; Attendance: 86; Referees: García, Paolantoni (ARG)

19 June 2024; 20:15	France	30–25	Spain	Jane Sandanski Arena, Skopje; Attendance: 78; Referees: Braseth, Sundet (NOR)
19 June 2024; 20:15	L. Borg 7	(17–12)	Arroyo 6	Jane Sandanski Arena, Skopje; Attendance: 78; Referees: Braseth, Sundet (NOR)
19 June 2024; 20:15	6× (suspension) 1× (red card)	Report	1× (yellow card) 3× (suspension)	Jane Sandanski Arena, Skopje; Attendance: 78; Referees: Braseth, Sundet (NOR)

21 June 2024; 15:45	Serbia	19–30	France	Jane Sandanski Arena, Skopje; Attendance: 88; Referees: Correa, Correa (BRA)
21 June 2024; 15:45	Radić 5	(10–14)	Genyah 6	Jane Sandanski Arena, Skopje; Attendance: 88; Referees: Correa, Correa (BRA)
21 June 2024; 15:45	1× (suspension)	Report	3× (suspension)	Jane Sandanski Arena, Skopje; Attendance: 88; Referees: Correa, Correa (BRA)

21 June 2024; 18:00	Germany	29–27	Spain	Jane Sandanski Arena, Skopje; Attendance: 150; Referees: El-Saied, El-Saied (EGY)
21 June 2024; 18:00	Däuble, Kühne 5	(17–16)	Poles 9	Jane Sandanski Arena, Skopje; Attendance: 150; Referees: El-Saied, El-Saied (EGY)
21 June 2024; 18:00	1× (yellow card) 2× (suspension)	Report	1× (yellow card) 3× (suspension)	Jane Sandanski Arena, Skopje; Attendance: 150; Referees: El-Saied, El-Saied (EGY)

22 June 2024; 18:00	Spain	32–17	Serbia	Jane Sandanski Arena, Skopje; Attendance: 66; Referees: Al-Enezi, Al-Nassem (KUW)
22 June 2024; 18:00	Arroyo 8	(12–8)	Ćetković, Radević 3	Jane Sandanski Arena, Skopje; Attendance: 66; Referees: Al-Enezi, Al-Nassem (KUW)
22 June 2024; 18:00	2× (suspension)	Report	3× (suspension)	Jane Sandanski Arena, Skopje; Attendance: 66; Referees: Al-Enezi, Al-Nassem (KUW)

22 June 2024; 20:15	France	29–27	Germany	Jane Sandanski Arena, Skopje; Attendance: 76; Referees: Mitrović, Vešović (MNE)
22 June 2024; 20:15	Pintat 6	(18–15)	Röpcke 8	Jane Sandanski Arena, Skopje; Attendance: 76; Referees: Mitrović, Vešović (MNE)
22 June 2024; 20:15	6× (suspension)	Report	1× (yellow card) 5× (suspension) 1× (red card)	Jane Sandanski Arena, Skopje; Attendance: 76; Referees: Mitrović, Vešović (MNE)

=== Group G ===
Pos	Team	Pld	W	D	L	GF	GA	GD	Pts	Qualification
1	Portugal	3	3	0	0	110	74	+36	6	Main round
2	Montenegro	3	2	0	1	121	96	+25	4	Main round
3	Guinea	3	1	0	2	78	103	−25	2	Presidents Cup
4	Uzbekistan	3	0	0	3	85	122	−37	0	Presidents Cup

Source: IHF
Rules for classification: 1) points; 2) head-to-head points; 3) head-to-head goal difference; 4) head-to-head number of goals scored; 5) goal difference.

19 June 2024; 11:15	Portugal	32–18	Guinea	Jane Sandanski Arena, Skopje; Attendance: 52; Referees: Pagh, Thygesen (DEN)
19 June 2024; 11:15	Figueiredo, Ribeiro 7	(15–8)	Soumah 5	Jane Sandanski Arena, Skopje; Attendance: 52; Referees: Pagh, Thygesen (DEN)
19 June 2024; 11:15	4× (suspension)	Report	2× (suspension)	Jane Sandanski Arena, Skopje; Attendance: 52; Referees: Pagh, Thygesen (DEN)

19 June 2024; 19:00	Montenegro	48–32	Uzbekistan	Jane Sandanski Arena 2, Skopje; Attendance: 25; Referees: Reyes, Zuñiga (CUB)
19 June 2024; 19:00	Milošević 9	(23–11)	Saparbaeva 8	Jane Sandanski Arena 2, Skopje; Attendance: 25; Referees: Reyes, Zuñiga (CUB)
19 June 2024; 19:00	1× (yellow card) 3× (suspension)	Report	3× (suspension)	Jane Sandanski Arena 2, Skopje; Attendance: 25; Referees: Reyes, Zuñiga (CUB)

21 June 2024; 11:15	Montenegro	43–30	Guinea	Jane Sandanski Arena, Skopje; Attendance: 60; Referees: Braseth, Sundet (NOR)
21 June 2024; 11:15	Vukčević 13	(25–13)	Soumah 10	Jane Sandanski Arena, Skopje; Attendance: 60; Referees: Braseth, Sundet (NOR)
21 June 2024; 11:15	4× (suspension) 1× (red card)	Report	3× (suspension)	Jane Sandanski Arena, Skopje; Attendance: 60; Referees: Braseth, Sundet (NOR)

21 June 2024; 13:30	Uzbekistan	25–44	Portugal	Jane Sandanski Arena, Skopje; Attendance: 30; Referees: Mikelić, Parađina (CRO)
21 June 2024; 13:30	Erkabaeva 8	(12–20)	Rebelo 9	Jane Sandanski Arena, Skopje; Attendance: 30; Referees: Mikelić, Parađina (CRO)
21 June 2024; 13:30	1× (yellow card) 4× (suspension)	Report	1× (yellow card) 3× (suspension)	Jane Sandanski Arena, Skopje; Attendance: 30; Referees: Mikelić, Parađina (CRO)

22 June 2024; 10:00	Guinea	30–28	Uzbekistan	Jane Sandanski Arena 2, Skopje; Attendance: 30; Referees: Gheisarian, Gheisarian (IRI)
22 June 2024; 10:00	Sankhon 10	(15–17)	Mullaeva 9	Jane Sandanski Arena 2, Skopje; Attendance: 30; Referees: Gheisarian, Gheisarian (IRI)
22 June 2024; 10:00	5× (suspension)	Report	3× (suspension)	Jane Sandanski Arena 2, Skopje; Attendance: 30; Referees: Gheisarian, Gheisarian (IRI)

22 June 2024; 11:15	Portugal	34–31	Montenegro	Jane Sandanski Arena, Skopje; Attendance: 75; Referees: Thiyagarajah, Thiyagarajah (GER)
22 June 2024; 11:15	Sequeira 9	(17–17)	Vukčević 10	Jane Sandanski Arena, Skopje; Attendance: 75; Referees: Thiyagarajah, Thiyagarajah (GER)
22 June 2024; 11:15	2× (yellow card) 5× (suspension)	Report	1× (yellow card) 3× (suspension)	Jane Sandanski Arena, Skopje; Attendance: 75; Referees: Thiyagarajah, Thiyagarajah (GER)

=== Group H ===
Pos	Team	Pld	W	D	L	GF	GA	GD	Pts	Qualification
1	Iceland	3	3	0	0	89	56	+33	6	Main round
2	North Macedonia (H)	3	2	0	1	77	68	+9	4	Main round
3	Angola	3	1	0	2	67	60	+7	2	Presidents Cup
4	United States	3	0	0	3	43	92	−49	0	Presidents Cup

Source: IHF
Rules for classification: 1) points; 2) head-to-head points; 3) head-to-head goal difference; 4) head-to-head number of goals scored; 5) goal difference.
(H) Hosts

19 June 2024; 16:00	Angola	19–24	Iceland	Jane Sandanski Arena 2, Skopje; Attendance: 50; Referees: Mikelić, Parađina (CRO)
19 June 2024; 16:00	Tumba 11	(9–9)	Ásmundsdóttir 7	Jane Sandanski Arena 2, Skopje; Attendance: 50; Referees: Mikelić, Parađina (CRO)
19 June 2024; 16:00	1× (yellow card) 4× (suspension) 2× (red card)	Report	2× (suspension)	Jane Sandanski Arena 2, Skopje; Attendance: 50; Referees: Mikelić, Parađina (CRO)

19 June 2024; 20:15	North Macedonia	32–15	United States	Boris Trajkovski Sports Center, Skopje; Attendance: 421; Referees: El-Saied, El-Saied (EGY)
19 June 2024; 20:15	Koceva 9	(15–6)	Ready 5	Boris Trajkovski Sports Center, Skopje; Attendance: 421; Referees: El-Saied, El-Saied (EGY)
19 June 2024; 20:15	3× (suspension)	Report	1× (yellow card) 3× (suspension)	Boris Trajkovski Sports Center, Skopje; Attendance: 421; Referees: El-Saied, El-Saied (EGY)

21 June 2024; 11:15	United States	8–24	Angola	Boris Trajkovski Sports Center, Skopje; Attendance: 66; Referees: Pukšič, Satler (SLO)
21 June 2024; 11:15	three players 2	(2–12)	Belo 11	Boris Trajkovski Sports Center, Skopje; Attendance: 66; Referees: Pukšič, Satler (SLO)
21 June 2024; 11:15	2× (suspension)	Report	8× (suspension)	Boris Trajkovski Sports Center, Skopje; Attendance: 66; Referees: Pukšič, Satler (SLO)

21 June 2024; 18:00	North Macedonia	17–29	Iceland	Boris Trajkovski Sports Center, Skopje; Attendance: 404; Referees: Thiyagarajah, Thiyagarajah (GER)
21 June 2024; 18:00	Rizoska 7	(11–11)	Þorkelsdóttir 6	Boris Trajkovski Sports Center, Skopje; Attendance: 404; Referees: Thiyagarajah, Thiyagarajah (GER)
21 June 2024; 18:00	2× (yellow card) 4× (suspension) 1× (red card)	Report	1× (yellow card) 2× (suspension)	Boris Trajkovski Sports Center, Skopje; Attendance: 404; Referees: Thiyagarajah, Thiyagarajah (GER)

22 June 2024; 19:00	Iceland	36–20	United States	Jane Sandanski Arena 2, Skopje; Attendance: 100; Referees: Pagh, Thygesen (ISL)
22 June 2024; 19:00	Jóhannsdóttir 6	(19–12)	Licea 6	Jane Sandanski Arena 2, Skopje; Attendance: 100; Referees: Pagh, Thygesen (ISL)
22 June 2024; 19:00	4× (suspension)	Report	4× (suspension)	Jane Sandanski Arena 2, Skopje; Attendance: 100; Referees: Pagh, Thygesen (ISL)

22 June 2024; 20:15	Angola	24–28	North Macedonia	Boris Trajkovski Sports Center, Skopje; Attendance: 473; Referees: Budzák, Záhradník (SVK)
22 June 2024; 20:15	Belo 11	(11–13)	Rizoska, Stefanoska 6	Boris Trajkovski Sports Center, Skopje; Attendance: 473; Referees: Budzák, Záhradník (SVK)
22 June 2024; 20:15	1× (yellow card) 4× (suspension) 1× (red card)	Report	6× (suspension)	Boris Trajkovski Sports Center, Skopje; Attendance: 473; Referees: Budzák, Záhradník (SVK)

== President's Cup ==
Points obtained in the matches against the team from the group were taken over.

=== Group I ===
Pos	Team	Pld	W	D	L	GF	GA	GD	Pts	Qualification
1	Brazil	3	3	0	0	84	60	+24	6	17–20th place semifinals
2	Tunisia	3	2	0	1	96	77	+19	4	21st–24th place semifinals
3	Iran	3	1	0	2	72	81	−9	2	25–28th place semifinals
4	Chile	3	0	0	3	67	101	−34	0	29th–32nd place semifinals

Source: IHF
Rules for classification: 1) points; 2) head-to-head points; 3) head-to-head goal difference; 4) head-to-head number of goals scored; 5) goal difference.

23 June 2024; 11:45	Tunisia	26–23	Iran	Boris Trajkovski Sports Center, Skopje; Attendance: 71; Referees: Reyes, Zuñiga (CUB)
23 June 2024; 11:45	Dabbabi 8	(11–9)	Merikh 14	Boris Trajkovski Sports Center, Skopje; Attendance: 71; Referees: Reyes, Zuñiga (CUB)
23 June 2024; 11:45	4× (suspension)	Report	6× (suspension)	Boris Trajkovski Sports Center, Skopje; Attendance: 71; Referees: Reyes, Zuñiga (CUB)

23 June 2024; 14:00	Brazil	28–14	Chile	Boris Trajkovski Sports Center, Skopje; Attendance: 46; Referees: Bozhinovski, Nachevski (MKD)
23 June 2024; 14:00	Oliveira 8	(11–6)	Larenas 3	Boris Trajkovski Sports Center, Skopje; Attendance: 46; Referees: Bozhinovski, Nachevski (MKD)
23 June 2024; 14:00	1× (suspension)	Report	4× (suspension)	Boris Trajkovski Sports Center, Skopje; Attendance: 46; Referees: Bozhinovski, Nachevski (MKD)

25 June 2024; 09:00	Iran	27–25	Chile	Boris Trajkovski Sports Center, Skopje; Attendance: 35; Referees: Camaux, Mursch (FRA)
25 June 2024; 09:00	Koudzarifarahani 8	(12–13)	three players 4	Boris Trajkovski Sports Center, Skopje; Attendance: 35; Referees: Camaux, Mursch (FRA)
25 June 2024; 09:00	2× (suspension)	Report	2× (suspension)	Boris Trajkovski Sports Center, Skopje; Attendance: 35; Referees: Camaux, Mursch (FRA)

25 June 2024; 11:15	Brazil	26–24	Tunisia	Boris Trajkovski Sports Center, Skopje; Attendance: 52; Referees: Pagh, Thygesen (DEN)
25 June 2024; 11:15	Silva 6	(15–9)	Ben Hassine 7	Boris Trajkovski Sports Center, Skopje; Attendance: 52; Referees: Pagh, Thygesen (DEN)
25 June 2024; 11:15	5× (suspension)	Report	2× (suspension)	Boris Trajkovski Sports Center, Skopje; Attendance: 52; Referees: Pagh, Thygesen (DEN)

=== Group II ===
Pos	Team	Pld	W	D	L	GF	GA	GD	Pts	Qualification
1	Japan	3	3	0	0	125	65	+60	6	17–20th place semifinals
2	Argentina	3	2	0	1	101	76	+25	4	21st–24th place semifinals
3	Chinese Taipei	3	1	0	2	89	86	+3	2	25–28th place semifinals
4	Mexico	3	0	0	3	44	132	−88	0	29th–32nd place semifinals

Source: IHF
Rules for classification: 1) points; 2) head-to-head points; 3) head-to-head goal difference; 4) head-to-head number of goals scored; 5) goal difference.

23 June 2024; 11:45	Argentina	27–25	Chinese Taipei	Jane Sandanski Arena, Skopje; Attendance: 100; Referees: Awwad, Al-Zayyat (JOR)
23 June 2024; 11:45	Gull 8	(13–13)	Lien 7	Jane Sandanski Arena, Skopje; Attendance: 100; Referees: Awwad, Al-Zayyat (JOR)
23 June 2024; 11:45	3× (suspension)	Report	4× (suspension)	Jane Sandanski Arena, Skopje; Attendance: 100; Referees: Awwad, Al-Zayyat (JOR)

23 June 2024; 14:00	Japan	47–12	Mexico	Jane Sandanski Arena, Skopje; Attendance: 30; Referees: Al-Enezi, Al-Nassem (KUW)
23 June 2024; 14:00	Terada 8	(25–5)	Campos, Paz 3	Jane Sandanski Arena, Skopje; Attendance: 30; Referees: Al-Enezi, Al-Nassem (KUW)
23 June 2024; 14:00	2× (suspension)	Report		Jane Sandanski Arena, Skopje; Attendance: 30; Referees: Al-Enezi, Al-Nassem (KUW)

25 June 2024; 09:00	Argentina	33–35	Japan	Jane Sandanski Arena, Skopje; Attendance: 55; Referees: Thiyagarajah, Thiyagarajah (GER)
25 June 2024; 09:00	Alfredi 11	(15–18)	Sasaki 6	Jane Sandanski Arena, Skopje; Attendance: 55; Referees: Thiyagarajah, Thiyagarajah (GER)
25 June 2024; 09:00	2× (suspension)	Report	1× (suspension)	Jane Sandanski Arena, Skopje; Attendance: 55; Referees: Thiyagarajah, Thiyagarajah (GER)

25 June 2024; 16:00	Mexico	16–44	Chinese Taipei	Jane Sandanski Arena, Skopje; Attendance: 10; Referees: Ghofli, Hassanzadeh (IRI)
25 June 2024; 16:00	Campos 4	(8–17)	Chang Y. 7	Jane Sandanski Arena, Skopje; Attendance: 10; Referees: Ghofli, Hassanzadeh (IRI)
25 June 2024; 16:00		Report	1× (yellow card) 2× (suspension)	Jane Sandanski Arena, Skopje; Attendance: 10; Referees: Ghofli, Hassanzadeh (IRI)

=== Group III ===
Pos	Team	Pld	W	D	L	GF	GA	GD	Pts	Qualification
1	Spain	3	2	1	0	105	60	+45	5	17–20th place semifinals
2	Serbia	3	2	0	1	73	74	−1	4	21st–24th place semifinals
3	Czech Republic	3	1	1	1	78	75	+3	3	25–28th place semifinals
4	Algeria	3	0	0	3	47	94	−47	0	29th–32nd place semifinals

Source: IHF
Rules for classification: 1) points; 2) head-to-head points; 3) head-to-head goal difference; 4) head-to-head number of goals scored; 5) goal difference.

24 June 2024; 11:45	Czech Republic	26–29	Serbia	Jane Sandanski Arena, Skopje; Attendance: 35; Referees: Braseth, Sundet (NOR)
24 June 2024; 11:45	Vávrová 6	(17–16)	Todorovski 7	Jane Sandanski Arena, Skopje; Attendance: 35; Referees: Braseth, Sundet (NOR)
24 June 2024; 11:45	5× (suspension)	Report	5× (suspension)	Jane Sandanski Arena, Skopje; Attendance: 35; Referees: Braseth, Sundet (NOR)

24 June 2024; 14:00	Spain	44–14	Algeria	Jane Sandanski Arena, Skopje; Attendance: 40; Referees: Pukšič, Satler (SLO)
24 June 2024; 14:00	Tort Net 7	(20–6)	Makdoud 6	Jane Sandanski Arena, Skopje; Attendance: 40; Referees: Pukšič, Satler (SLO)
24 June 2024; 14:00	2× (suspension)	Report	2× (suspension)	Jane Sandanski Arena, Skopje; Attendance: 40; Referees: Pukšič, Satler (SLO)

25 June 2024; 11:15	Czech Republic	29–29	Spain	Jane Sandanski Arena 2, Skopje; Attendance: 70; Referees: Al-Saqer, Al-Suqufi (KSA)
25 June 2024; 11:15	Schreibmeierová 11	(19–16)	three players 5	Jane Sandanski Arena 2, Skopje; Attendance: 70; Referees: Al-Saqer, Al-Suqufi (KSA)
25 June 2024; 11:15	3× (suspension)	Report	3× (suspension)	Jane Sandanski Arena 2, Skopje; Attendance: 70; Referees: Al-Saqer, Al-Suqufi (KSA)

25 June 2024; 19:00	Algeria	16–27	Serbia	Jane Sandanski Arena 2, Skopje; Attendance: 30; Referees: Gheisarian, Gheisarian (IRI)
25 June 2024; 19:00	Naceur, Yelles 4	(9–11)	Ćetković 7	Jane Sandanski Arena 2, Skopje; Attendance: 30; Referees: Gheisarian, Gheisarian (IRI)
25 June 2024; 19:00	3× (suspension)	Report	1× (suspension)	Jane Sandanski Arena 2, Skopje; Attendance: 30; Referees: Gheisarian, Gheisarian (IRI)

=== Group IV ===
Pos	Team	Pld	W	D	L	GF	GA	GD	Pts	Qualification
1	Angola	3	3	0	0	90	48	+42	6	17–20th place semifinals
2	Guinea	3	2	0	1	74	66	+8	4	21st–24th place semifinals
3	Uzbekistan	3	1	0	2	88	98	−10	2	25–28th place semifinals
4	United States	3	0	0	3	48	88	−40	0	29th–32nd place semifinals

Source: IHF
Rules for classification: 1) points; 2) head-to-head points; 3) head-to-head goal difference; 4) head-to-head number of goals scored; 5) goal difference.

24 June 2024; 11:45	Guinea	22–15	United States	Boris Trajkovski Sports Center, Skopje; Attendance: 80; Referees: Al-Saqer, Al-Suqufi (KSA)
24 June 2024; 11:45	Konaté 6	(11–6)	Licea 5	Boris Trajkovski Sports Center, Skopje; Attendance: 80; Referees: Al-Saqer, Al-Suqufi (KSA)
24 June 2024; 11:45	2× (suspension)	Report	2× (suspension)	Boris Trajkovski Sports Center, Skopje; Attendance: 80; Referees: Al-Saqer, Al-Suqufi (KSA)

24 June 2024; 14:00	Angola	43–18	Uzbekistan	Boris Trajkovski Sports Center, Skopje; Attendance: 43; Referees: Ghofli, Hassanzadeh (IRI)
24 June 2024; 14:00	Belo, Pedro 7	(21–9)	Erkabaeva 9	Boris Trajkovski Sports Center, Skopje; Attendance: 43; Referees: Ghofli, Hassanzadeh (IRI)
24 June 2024; 14:00	1× (yellow card) 3× (suspension)	Report		Boris Trajkovski Sports Center, Skopje; Attendance: 43; Referees: Ghofli, Hassanzadeh (IRI)

25 June 2024; 10:00	Guinea	22–23	Angola	Jane Sandanski Arena 2, Skopje; Attendance: 30; Referees: El-Saied, El-Saied (EGY)
25 June 2024; 10:00	Soumah 7	(11–8)	Belo 7	Jane Sandanski Arena 2, Skopje; Attendance: 30; Referees: El-Saied, El-Saied (EGY)
25 June 2024; 10:00	1× (yellow card) 5× (suspension)	Report	8× (suspension)	Jane Sandanski Arena 2, Skopje; Attendance: 30; Referees: El-Saied, El-Saied (EGY)

25 June 2024; 13:00	Uzbekistan	42–25	United States	Jane Sandanski Arena 2, Skopje; Attendance: 20; Referees: Soria, Satler
25 June 2024; 13:00	Erkabaeva, Mullaeva 9	(20–14)	Nesper 7	Jane Sandanski Arena 2, Skopje; Attendance: 20; Referees: Soria, Satler
25 June 2024; 13:00	2× (suspension)	Report	4× (suspension)	Jane Sandanski Arena 2, Skopje; Attendance: 20; Referees: Soria, Satler

== Main round ==
Points obtained in the matches against the team from the group were taken over.

=== Group I ===
Pos	Team	Pld	W	D	L	GF	GA	GD	Pts	Qualification
1	Netherlands	3	3	0	0	80	72	+8	6	Quarterfinals
2	Switzerland	3	2	0	1	87	79	+8	4	Quarterfinals
3	Romania	3	1	0	2	84	79	+5	2	9–12th place semifinals
4	Egypt	3	0	0	3	62	83	−21	0	13–16th place semifinals

Source: IHF
Rules for classification: 1) points; 2) head-to-head points; 3) head-to-head goal difference; 4) head-to-head number of goals scored; 5) goal difference.

23 June 2024; 16:15	Netherlands	20–17	Egypt	Boris Trajkovski Sports Center, Skopje; Attendance: 93; Referees: Correa, Correa (BRA)
23 June 2024; 16:15	four players 3	(9–9)	Osama 8	Boris Trajkovski Sports Center, Skopje; Attendance: 93; Referees: Correa, Correa (BRA)
23 June 2024; 16:15	2× (suspension)	Report	1× (suspension)	Boris Trajkovski Sports Center, Skopje; Attendance: 93; Referees: Correa, Correa (BRA)

23 June 2024; 18:30	Switzerland	27–26	Romania	Boris Trajkovski Sports Center, Skopje; Attendance: 99; Referees: Camaux, Mursch (FRA)
23 June 2024; 18:30	Riner 8	(15–12)	Mohamed 6	Boris Trajkovski Sports Center, Skopje; Attendance: 99; Referees: Camaux, Mursch (FRA)
23 June 2024; 18:30	3× (suspension)	Report	2× (suspension)	Boris Trajkovski Sports Center, Skopje; Attendance: 99; Referees: Camaux, Mursch (FRA)

25 June 2024; 13:30	Netherlands	31–29	Switzerland	Jane Sandanski Arena, Skopje; Attendance: 300; Referees: Braseth, Sundet (NOR)
25 June 2024; 13:30	Van Vliet 7	(15–14)	Lauper 5	Jane Sandanski Arena, Skopje; Attendance: 300; Referees: Braseth, Sundet (NOR)
25 June 2024; 13:30	1× (yellow card) 3× (suspension)	Report	2× (suspension)	Jane Sandanski Arena, Skopje; Attendance: 300; Referees: Braseth, Sundet (NOR)

25 June 2024; 15:45	Romania	32–23	Egypt	Jane Sandanski Arena, Skopje; Attendance: 100; Referees: Mitrović, Vešović (MNE)
25 June 2024; 15:45	Boiciuc 5	(16–7)	Abdelrahman, Ibrahim 5	Jane Sandanski Arena, Skopje; Attendance: 100; Referees: Mitrović, Vešović (MNE)
25 June 2024; 15:45	1× (suspension)	Report	2× (suspension)	Jane Sandanski Arena, Skopje; Attendance: 100; Referees: Mitrović, Vešović (MNE)

=== Group II ===
Pos	Team	Pld	W	D	L	GF	GA	GD	Pts	Qualification
1	Hungary	3	3	0	0	94	66	+28	6	Quarterfinals
2	Denmark	3	2	0	1	85	79	+6	4	Quarterfinals
3	Norway	3	1	0	2	84	86	−2	2	9–12th place semifinals
4	South Korea	3	0	0	3	62	94	−32	0	13–16th place semifinals

Source: IHF
Rules for classification: 1) points; 2) head-to-head points; 3) head-to-head goal difference; 4) head-to-head number of goals scored; 5) goal difference.

23 June 2024; 16:15	Hungary	31–26	Norway	Jane Sandanski Arena, Skopje; Attendance: 150; Referees: García, Paolantoni (ARG)
23 June 2024; 16:15	Csikós 6	(18–11)	Rosenberg 6	Jane Sandanski Arena, Skopje; Attendance: 150; Referees: García, Paolantoni (ARG)
23 June 2024; 16:15	1× (yellow card) 2× (suspension)	Report	4× (suspension)	Jane Sandanski Arena, Skopje; Attendance: 150; Referees: García, Paolantoni (ARG)

23 June 2024; 18:30	Denmark	29–23	South Korea	J. Sandanski Arena and B. Trajkovski SC (Note: After halftime, Skopje was hit by a strong hailstorm and the power in the Jane Sandanski Arena went off and could not be restored. The match was delayed and the venue changed for the second half to the Boris Trajkovski Sports Center.); Attendance: 55; Referees: Gheisarian, Gheisarian (IRI)
23 June 2024; 18:30	Bang, Vestergaard 5	(19–12)	Lee 6	J. Sandanski Arena and B. Trajkovski SC; Attendance: 55; Referees: Gheisarian, Gheisarian (IRI)
23 June 2024; 18:30		Report	1× (yellow card) 3× (suspension)	J. Sandanski Arena and B. Trajkovski SC; Attendance: 55; Referees: Gheisarian, Gheisarian (IRI)

25 June 2024; 13:30	Hungary	31–23	Denmark	Boris Trajkovski Sports Center, Skopje; Attendance: 198; Referees: Correa, Correa (BRA)
25 June 2024; 13:30	Farkas 7	(15–12)	Bang 6	Boris Trajkovski Sports Center, Skopje; Attendance: 198; Referees: Correa, Correa (BRA)
25 June 2024; 13:30	1× (suspension)	Report	1× (yellow card) 1× (suspension)	Boris Trajkovski Sports Center, Skopje; Attendance: 198; Referees: Correa, Correa (BRA)

25 June 2024; 15:45	South Korea	22–33	Norway	Boris Trajkovski Sports Center, Skopje; Attendance: 53; Referees: Reyes, Zuñiga (CUB)
25 June 2024; 15:45	Lee 6	(12–15)	Rosenberg 8	Boris Trajkovski Sports Center, Skopje; Attendance: 53; Referees: Reyes, Zuñiga (CUB)
25 June 2024; 15:45	2× (suspension)	Report	3× (suspension)	Boris Trajkovski Sports Center, Skopje; Attendance: 53; Referees: Reyes, Zuñiga (CUB)

=== Group III ===
Pos	Team	Pld	W	D	L	GF	GA	GD	Pts	Qualification
1	France	3	3	0	0	99	66	+33	6	Quarterfinals
2	Sweden	3	2	0	1	86	75	+11	4	Quarterfinals
3	Germany	3	1	0	2	90	80	+10	2	9–12th place semifinals
4	China	3	0	0	3	64	118	−54	0	13–16th place semifinals

Source: IHF
Rules for classification: 1) points; 2) head-to-head points; 3) head-to-head goal difference; 4) head-to-head number of goals scored; 5) goal difference.

24 June 2024; 16:15	Sweden	26–25	Germany	Jane Sandanski Arena, Skopje; Referees: Mikelić, Parađina (CRO)
24 June 2024; 16:15	Wiksfors 7	(14–10)	Däuble 7	Jane Sandanski Arena, Skopje; Referees: Mikelić, Parađina (CRO)
24 June 2024; 16:15	3× (suspension)	Report	1× (yellow card) 1× (suspension)	Jane Sandanski Arena, Skopje; Referees: Mikelić, Parađina (CRO)

24 June 2024; 18:30	France	42–15	China	Jane Sandanski Arena, Skopje; Attendance: 100; Referees: Balvan, Praštalo (BIH)
24 June 2024; 18:30	Tucella 6	(16–9)	Liu X. 6	Jane Sandanski Arena, Skopje; Attendance: 100; Referees: Balvan, Praštalo (BIH)
24 June 2024; 18:30	1× (yellow card) 2× (suspension)	Report	1× (yellow card) 1× (suspension)	Jane Sandanski Arena, Skopje; Attendance: 100; Referees: Balvan, Praštalo (BIH)

25 June 2024; 18:00	Sweden	22–28	France	Jane Sandanski Arena, Skopje; Attendance: 107; Referees: Bozhinovski, Nachevski (MKD)
25 June 2024; 18:00	Kylberg 5	(11–14)	Errard, Perret 5	Jane Sandanski Arena, Skopje; Attendance: 107; Referees: Bozhinovski, Nachevski (MKD)
25 June 2024; 18:00	1× (suspension)	Report	2× (suspension)	Jane Sandanski Arena, Skopje; Attendance: 107; Referees: Bozhinovski, Nachevski (MKD)

25 June 2024; 20:15	China	25–38	Germany	Jane Sandanski Arena, Skopje; Attendance: 75; Referees: Al-Zayyat, Awwad (JOR)
25 June 2024; 20:15	Liu X. 7	(18–19)	Bianco, Probst 6	Jane Sandanski Arena, Skopje; Attendance: 75; Referees: Al-Zayyat, Awwad (JOR)
25 June 2024; 20:15	3× (suspension)	Report		Jane Sandanski Arena, Skopje; Attendance: 75; Referees: Al-Zayyat, Awwad (JOR)

=== Group IV ===
Pos	Team	Pld	W	D	L	GF	GA	GD	Pts	Qualification
1	Portugal	3	2	1	0	88	84	+4	5	Quarterfinals
2	Iceland	3	2	0	1	89	70	+19	4	Quarterfinals
3	Montenegro	3	1	0	2	84	92	−8	2	9–12th place semifinals
4	North Macedonia (H)	3	0	1	2	68	83	−15	1	13–16th place semifinals

Source: IHF
Rules for classification: 1) points; 2) head-to-head points; 3) head-to-head goal difference; 4) head-to-head number of goals scored; 5) goal difference.
(H) Hosts

24 June 2024; 16:15	Portugal	28–28	North Macedonia	Boris Trajkovski Sports Center, Skopje; Referees: El-Saied, El-Saied (EGY)
24 June 2024; 16:15	Rebelo 9	(14–13)	Stefanoska 9	Boris Trajkovski Sports Center, Skopje; Referees: El-Saied, El-Saied (EGY)
24 June 2024; 16:15	2× (yellow card) 7× (suspension)	Report	1× (yellow card) 7× (suspension)	Boris Trajkovski Sports Center, Skopje; Referees: El-Saied, El-Saied (EGY)

24 June 2024; 18:30	Iceland	35–27	Montenegro	Boris Trajkovski Sports Center, Skopje; Attendance: 191; Referees: Budzák, Záhradník (SVK)
24 June 2024; 18:30	Ágústsdóttir 13	(15–14)	Vukčević 13	Boris Trajkovski Sports Center, Skopje; Attendance: 191; Referees: Budzák, Záhradník (SVK)
24 June 2024; 18:30	1× (yellow card) 1× (suspension)	Report	1× (yellow card) 4× (suspension) 1× (red card)	Boris Trajkovski Sports Center, Skopje; Attendance: 191; Referees: Budzák, Záhradník (SVK)

25 June 2024; 18:00	Portugal	26–25	Iceland	Boris Trajkovski Sports Center, Skopje; Attendance: 91; Referees: Sekulić, Jovandić (SRB)
25 June 2024; 18:00	Sequeira 8	(14–14)	Thorkelsdóttir 8	Boris Trajkovski Sports Center, Skopje; Attendance: 91; Referees: Sekulić, Jovandić (SRB)
25 June 2024; 18:00	1× (suspension)	Report		Boris Trajkovski Sports Center, Skopje; Attendance: 91; Referees: Sekulić, Jovandić (SRB)

25 June 2024; 20:15	Montenegro	26–23	North Macedonia	Boris Trajkovski Sports Center, Skopje; Attendance: 409; Referees: García, Paolantoni (ARG)
25 June 2024; 20:15	Vukčević 13	(10–12)	Mladenovska 8	Boris Trajkovski Sports Center, Skopje; Attendance: 409; Referees: García, Paolantoni (ARG)
25 June 2024; 20:15	5× (suspension)	Report	2× (suspension)	Boris Trajkovski Sports Center, Skopje; Attendance: 409; Referees: García, Paolantoni (ARG)

== Placement matches ==
=== 29th place bracket ===
29–32nd place semifinals
27 June
Chile (Pen.)	25 (9)
Algeria	25 (8)
27 June
Mexico	21
United States	25

29th place game
28 June
Chile	33
United States	26
31st place game
28 June
Algeria (Pen.)	19 (5)
Mexico	19 (4)

==== 29th–32nd place semifinals ====
27 June 2024; 12:00	Mexico	21–25	United States	Jane Sandanski Arena 2, Skopje; Attendance: 40; Referees: Al-Zayyat, Awwad (JOR)
27 June 2024; 12:00	Paz 5	(12–12)	Licea 7	Jane Sandanski Arena 2, Skopje; Attendance: 40; Referees: Al-Zayyat, Awwad (JOR)
27 June 2024; 12:00	3× (suspension)	Report	1× (suspension)	Jane Sandanski Arena 2, Skopje; Attendance: 40; Referees: Al-Zayyat, Awwad (JOR)

27 June 2024
17:00
Chile
34–33
Algeria
Jane Sandanski Arena 2, Skopje
Attendance: 60
Referees: Ghofli, Hassanzadeh (IRI)
Paul 8
(12–16)
Yelles 7
4× (suspension)
Report
6× (suspension)

FT: 25–25 Pen: 9–8

==== 31st place game ====
28 June 2024
13:00
Algeria
24–23
Mexico
Jane Sandanski Arena 2, Skopje
Attendance: 15
Referees: Mikelić, Parađina (CRO)
Chebli 5
(9–11)
Virgen 6
2× (suspension)
Report
5× (suspension)

FT: 19–19 Pen: 5–4

==== 29th place game ====
28 June 2024; 15:30	Chile	33–26	United States	Jane Sandanski Arena 2, Skopje; Attendance: 30; Referees: Al-Saquer, Al-Suqufi (KSA)
28 June 2024; 15:30	Riquelme 8	(18–13)	Licea 6	Jane Sandanski Arena 2, Skopje; Attendance: 30; Referees: Al-Saquer, Al-Suqufi (KSA)
28 June 2024; 15:30	2× (suspension)	Report	3× (suspension)	Jane Sandanski Arena 2, Skopje; Attendance: 30; Referees: Al-Saquer, Al-Suqufi (KSA)

=== 25th place bracket ===
25–28th place semifinals
27 June
Iran	17
Czech Republic	29
27 June
Chinese Taipei	39
Uzbekistan	32

25th place game
28 June
Czech Republic	36
Chinese Taipei	15
27th place game
28 June
Iran	40
Uzbekistan	31

==== 25–28th place semifinals ====
27 June 2024; 11:15	Iran	17–29	Czech Republic	Jane Sandanski Arena, Skopje; Attendance: 67; Referees: Balvan, Praštalo (BIH)
27 June 2024; 11:15	Merikh 9	(4–16)	Schreibmeierová 5	Jane Sandanski Arena, Skopje; Attendance: 67; Referees: Balvan, Praštalo (BIH)
27 June 2024; 11:15	4× (suspension)	Report	3× (suspension)	Jane Sandanski Arena, Skopje; Attendance: 67; Referees: Balvan, Praštalo (BIH)

27 June 2024; 19:30	Chinese Taipei	39–32	Uzbekistan	Jane Sandanski Arena 2, Skopje; Attendance: 20; Referees: Al-Saqer, Al-Suqufi (KSA)
27 June 2024; 19:30	Lien, Lin 8	(20–13)	Erkabaeva 9	Jane Sandanski Arena 2, Skopje; Attendance: 20; Referees: Al-Saqer, Al-Suqufi (KSA)
27 June 2024; 19:30	5× (suspension)	Report	7× (suspension)	Jane Sandanski Arena 2, Skopje; Attendance: 20; Referees: Al-Saqer, Al-Suqufi (KSA)

==== 27th place game ====
28 June 2024; 20:30	Iran	40–31	Uzbekistan	Jane Sandanski Arena 2, Skopje; Attendance: 23; Referees: Reyes, Soria
28 June 2024; 20:30	Merikh 14	(20–16)	Erkabaeva 12	Jane Sandanski Arena 2, Skopje; Attendance: 23; Referees: Reyes, Soria
28 June 2024; 20:30	1× (yellow card) 2× (suspension)	Report	1× (yellow card) 3× (suspension)	Jane Sandanski Arena 2, Skopje; Attendance: 23; Referees: Reyes, Soria

==== 25th place game ====
28 June 2024; 18:00	Czech Republic	36–15	Chinese Taipei	Jane Sandanski Arena 2, Skopje; Attendance: 45; Referees: Al-Enezi, Al-Nassem (KUW)
28 June 2024; 18:00	Jestříbková 6	(14–7)	Tien 6	Jane Sandanski Arena 2, Skopje; Attendance: 45; Referees: Al-Enezi, Al-Nassem (KUW)
28 June 2024; 18:00	8× (suspension) 2× (red card)	Report	3× (suspension) 2× (red card)	Jane Sandanski Arena 2, Skopje; Attendance: 45; Referees: Al-Enezi, Al-Nassem (KUW)

=== 21st place bracket ===
21st–24th place semifinals
27 June
Tunisia	26
Serbia	27
27 June
Argentina	31
Guinea	26

21st place game
28 June
Serbia	26
Argentina	27
23rd place game
28 June
Tunisia	21
Guinea	22

==== 21st–24th place semifinals ====
27 June 2024; 09:00	Argentina	31–26	Guinea	Jane Sandanski Arena, Skopje; Attendance: 62; Referees: Gheisarian, Gheisarian (IRI)
27 June 2024; 09:00	Spinelli 7	(15–12)	Bangoura, Ma. Soumah 6	Jane Sandanski Arena, Skopje; Attendance: 62; Referees: Gheisarian, Gheisarian (IRI)
27 June 2024; 09:00	2× (suspension)	Report	3× (suspension) 1× (red card)	Jane Sandanski Arena, Skopje; Attendance: 62; Referees: Gheisarian, Gheisarian (IRI)

27 June 2024; 14:30	Tunisia	26–27	Serbia	Jane Sandanski Arena 2, Skopje; Attendance: 50; Referees: Correa, Correa (BRA)
27 June 2024; 14:30	Ben Hassine 6	(15–15)	Ćetković 6	Jane Sandanski Arena 2, Skopje; Attendance: 50; Referees: Correa, Correa (BRA)
27 June 2024; 14:30	1× (yellow card) 1× (suspension)	Report	2× (suspension)	Jane Sandanski Arena 2, Skopje; Attendance: 50; Referees: Correa, Correa (BRA)

==== 23rd place game ====
28 June 2024; 10:30	Tunisia	21–22	Guinea	Jane Sandanski Arena 2, Skopje; Attendance: 30; Referees: Ghofli, Hassanzadeh (IRI)
28 June 2024; 10:30	Rmiza 6	(10–10)	Soumah 6	Jane Sandanski Arena 2, Skopje; Attendance: 30; Referees: Ghofli, Hassanzadeh (IRI)
28 June 2024; 10:30	1× (yellow card) 3× (suspension)	Report	3× (suspension)	Jane Sandanski Arena 2, Skopje; Attendance: 30; Referees: Ghofli, Hassanzadeh (IRI)

==== 21st place game ====
28 June 2024; 11:15	Serbia	26–27	Argentina	Jane Sandanski Arena, Skopje; Attendance: 72; Referees: Awwad, Al-Zayyat (JOR)
28 June 2024; 11:15	Ćetković 9	(11–12)	Gull 8	Jane Sandanski Arena, Skopje; Attendance: 72; Referees: Awwad, Al-Zayyat (JOR)
28 June 2024; 11:15	1× (suspension)	Report	2× (suspension)	Jane Sandanski Arena, Skopje; Attendance: 72; Referees: Awwad, Al-Zayyat (JOR)

=== 17th place bracket ===
17–20th place semifinals
27 June
Brazil	20
Spain	33
27 June
Japan	27
Angola	30

17th place game
28 June
Spain	24
Angola	18
19th place game
28 June
Brazil	38
Japan	32

==== 17–20th place semifinals ====
27 June 2024; 09:30	Japan	27–30	Angola	Jane Sandanski Arena 2, Skopje; Attendance: 30; Referees: Pagh, Thygesen (DEN)
27 June 2024; 09:30	Konya, Yamaguchi 5	(13–15)	Belo 11	Jane Sandanski Arena 2, Skopje; Attendance: 30; Referees: Pagh, Thygesen (DEN)
27 June 2024; 09:30	1× (suspension)	Report	4× (suspension)	Jane Sandanski Arena 2, Skopje; Attendance: 30; Referees: Pagh, Thygesen (DEN)

27 June 2024; 10:30	Brazil	20–33	Spain	Boris Trajkovski Sports Center, Skopje; Attendance: 48; Referees: Mitrović, Vešović (MNE)
27 June 2024; 10:30	De Souza 7	(14–18)	Poles 8	Boris Trajkovski Sports Center, Skopje; Attendance: 48; Referees: Mitrović, Vešović (MNE)
27 June 2024; 10:30	3× (suspension)	Report	3× (suspension)	Boris Trajkovski Sports Center, Skopje; Attendance: 48; Referees: Mitrović, Vešović (MNE)

==== 19th place game ====
28 June 2024; 09:00	Brazil	38–32	Japan	Jane Sandanski Arena, Skopje; Attendance: 30; Referees: Balvan, Praštalo (BIH)
28 June 2024; 09:00	Rodrigues, Soares 7	(23–15)	Konya 8	Jane Sandanski Arena, Skopje; Attendance: 30; Referees: Balvan, Praštalo (BIH)
28 June 2024; 09:00	2× (suspension)	Report		Jane Sandanski Arena, Skopje; Attendance: 30; Referees: Balvan, Praštalo (BIH)

==== 17th place game ====
28 June 2024; 10:30	Spain	24–18	Angola	Boris Trajkovski Sports Center, Skopje; Attendance: 74; Referees: El-Saied, El-Saied (EGY)
28 June 2024; 10:30	Manterola 5	(12–10)	Belo 12	Boris Trajkovski Sports Center, Skopje; Attendance: 74; Referees: El-Saied, El-Saied (EGY)
28 June 2024; 10:30	2× (yellow card) 1× (suspension)	Report	6× (suspension)	Boris Trajkovski Sports Center, Skopje; Attendance: 74; Referees: El-Saied, El-Saied (EGY)

=== 13–16th place bracket ===
13–16th place semifinals
27 June
Egypt	25
China	20
27 June
South Korea	34
North Macedonia	19

13th place game
28 June
Egypt	29
South Korea	23
15th place game
28 June
China	25
North Macedonia	23

==== 13–16th place semifinals ====
27 June 2024; 13:30	Egypt	25–20	China	Boris Trajkovski Sports Center, Skopje; Attendance: 31; Referees: Reyes, Zuñiga (CUB)
27 June 2024; 13:30	Omar 8	(13–12)	Liu X. 6	Boris Trajkovski Sports Center, Skopje; Attendance: 31; Referees: Reyes, Zuñiga (CUB)
27 June 2024; 13:30	2× (suspension)	Report	3× (suspension)	Boris Trajkovski Sports Center, Skopje; Attendance: 31; Referees: Reyes, Zuñiga (CUB)

27 June 2024; 15:45	South Korea	34–19	North Macedonia	Boris Trajkovski Sports Center, Skopje; Attendance: 232; Referees: Thiyagarajah, Thiyagarajah (GER)
27 June 2024; 15:45	Kim Ji-a 8	(17–10)	Koceva 6	Boris Trajkovski Sports Center, Skopje; Attendance: 232; Referees: Thiyagarajah, Thiyagarajah (GER)
27 June 2024; 15:45	1× (yellow card) 2× (suspension)	Report	1× (yellow card) 2× (suspension)	Boris Trajkovski Sports Center, Skopje; Attendance: 232; Referees: Thiyagarajah, Thiyagarajah (GER)

==== 15th place game ====
28 June 2024; 15:45	China	25–23	North Macedonia	Boris Trajkovski Sports Center, Skopje; Attendance: 177; Referees: Pagh, Thygesen (DEN)
28 June 2024; 15:45	Zhuang	(14–12)	Rizoska 11	Boris Trajkovski Sports Center, Skopje; Attendance: 177; Referees: Pagh, Thygesen (DEN)
28 June 2024; 15:45	1× (yellow card) 2× (suspension)	Report		Boris Trajkovski Sports Center, Skopje; Attendance: 177; Referees: Pagh, Thygesen (DEN)

==== 13th place game ====
28 June 2024; 13:30	Egypt	29–23	South Korea	Boris Trajkovski Sports Center, Skopje; Attendance: 60; Referees: Pukšič, Satler (SLO)
28 June 2024; 13:30	Omar 11	(12–11)	Cha 5	Boris Trajkovski Sports Center, Skopje; Attendance: 60; Referees: Pukšič, Satler (SLO)
28 June 2024; 13:30	3× (suspension)	Report	2× (suspension)	Boris Trajkovski Sports Center, Skopje; Attendance: 60; Referees: Pukšič, Satler (SLO)

=== 9–12th place bracket ===
9–12th place semifinals
27 June
Romania	32
Germany	34
27 June
Norway	42
Montenegro	27

Ninth place game
28 June
Germany	28
Norway	18
Eleventh place game
28 June
Romania	42
Montenegro	28

==== 9–12th place semifinals ====
27 June 2024; 13:00	Romania	32–34	Germany	Jane Sandanski Arena, Skopje; Attendance: 106; Referees: Pukšič, Satler (SLO)
27 June 2024; 13:00	Lixăndroiu 9	(16–19)	Petzold 6	Jane Sandanski Arena, Skopje; Attendance: 106; Referees: Pukšič, Satler (SLO)
27 June 2024; 13:00	1× (yellow card) 2× (suspension)	Report	2× (suspension)	Jane Sandanski Arena, Skopje; Attendance: 106; Referees: Pukšič, Satler (SLO)

27 June 2024; 15:30	Norway	42–27	Montenegro	Jane Sandanski Arena, Skopje; Attendance: 70; Referees: Al-Enezi, Al-Nassem (KUW)
27 June 2024; 15:30	Grønstad 6	(24–14)	Vukčević 12	Jane Sandanski Arena, Skopje; Attendance: 70; Referees: Al-Enezi, Al-Nassem (KUW)
27 June 2024; 15:30	1× (yellow card) 4× (suspension)	Report	4× (suspension) 1× (red card)	Jane Sandanski Arena, Skopje; Attendance: 70; Referees: Al-Enezi, Al-Nassem (KUW)

==== Eleventh place game ====
28 June 2024; 15:30	Romania	42–28	Montenegro	Jane Sandanski Arena, Skopje; Attendance: 87; Referees: Budzák, Záhradnik (SVK)
28 June 2024; 15:30	Boiciuc, Grigore 6	(20–12)	Burić 7	Jane Sandanski Arena, Skopje; Attendance: 87; Referees: Budzák, Záhradnik (SVK)
28 June 2024; 15:30	3× (suspension)	Report	1× (yellow card) 4× (suspension)	Jane Sandanski Arena, Skopje; Attendance: 87; Referees: Budzák, Záhradnik (SVK)

==== Ninth place game ====
28 June 2024; 13:00	Germany	28–18	Norway	Jane Sandanski Arena, Skopje; Attendance: 85; Referees: Mitrović, Vešović (MNE)
28 June 2024; 13:00	Probst 5	(13–9)	Mjøs, Rosenberg 4	Jane Sandanski Arena, Skopje; Attendance: 85; Referees: Mitrović, Vešović (MNE)
28 June 2024; 13:00	1× (yellow card) 4× (suspension)	Report	1× (yellow card) 4× (suspension)	Jane Sandanski Arena, Skopje; Attendance: 85; Referees: Mitrović, Vešović (MNE)

== Knockout stage ==
=== Bracket ===
Championship bracket

Quarter-finals
27 June
Netherlands	25
Sweden	21
27 June
Hungary (OT)	34
Iceland	31
27 June
France	34
Switzerland	26
27 June
Portugal	22
Denmark	49

Semi-finals
28 June
Netherlands	24
Hungary	28
28 June
France	32
Denmark	26

Final
30 June
Hungary	26
France	29
Third place
30 June
Netherlands	34
Denmark	28

5–8th place bracket

5–8th place semifinals
28 June
Sweden	33
Iceland	31
28 June
Switzerland	25
Portugal	30

Fifth place game
30 June
Sweden	25
Portugal	26
Seventh place game
30 June
Iceland	29
Switzerland	26

=== Quarterfinals ===
27 June 2024
18:00
Hungary
34–31 (ET)
Iceland
Jane Sandanski Arena, Skopje
Attendance: 182
Referees: Bozhinovski, Nachevski (MKD)
Varga 6
(19–12)
Ágústsdóttir 7
1× (yellow card) 7× (suspension)
Report
1× (yellow card) 6× (suspension) 1× (red card)

FT: 29–29 ET: 5–2

27 June 2024; 18:00	Netherlands	25–21	Sweden	Boris Trajkovski Sports Center, Skopje; Attendance: 152; Referees: Camaux, Mursch (FRA)
27 June 2024; 18:00	Maarschalkerweerd 7	(14–8)	Wiksfors 5	Boris Trajkovski Sports Center, Skopje; Attendance: 152; Referees: Camaux, Mursch (FRA)
27 June 2024; 18:00	4× (suspension)	Report	1× (yellow card) 1× (suspension)	Boris Trajkovski Sports Center, Skopje; Attendance: 152; Referees: Camaux, Mursch (FRA)

27 June 2024; 20:30	Portugal	22–49	Denmark	Jane Sandanski Arena, Skopje; Attendance: 68; Referees: Budzák, Záhradník (SVK)
27 June 2024; 20:30	Sequeira 11	(10–21)	Vestergaard 9	Jane Sandanski Arena, Skopje; Attendance: 68; Referees: Budzák, Záhradník (SVK)
27 June 2024; 20:30	6× (suspension)	Report	3× (suspension)	Jane Sandanski Arena, Skopje; Attendance: 68; Referees: Budzák, Záhradník (SVK)

27 June 2022; 20:30	France	34–26	Switzerland	Boris Trajkovski Sports Center, Skopje; Attendance: 134; Referees: Mikelić, Parađina (CRO)
27 June 2022; 20:30	E. Borg, Dury 7	(16–14)	Bächtiger 10	Boris Trajkovski Sports Center, Skopje; Attendance: 134; Referees: Mikelić, Parađina (CRO)
27 June 2022; 20:30	3× (suspension)	Report	3× (suspension)	Boris Trajkovski Sports Center, Skopje; Attendance: 134; Referees: Mikelić, Parađina (CRO)

=== 5–8th place semifinals ===
28 June 2024; 18:00	Sweden	33–31	Iceland	Jane Sandanski Arena, Skopje; Attendance: 207; Referees: Sekulić, Jovandić (SRB)
28 June 2024; 18:00	Mihailovic 7	(17–15)	Ágústsdóttir 12	Jane Sandanski Arena, Skopje; Attendance: 207; Referees: Sekulić, Jovandić (SRB)
28 June 2024; 18:00	1× (yellow card) 3× (suspension) 1× (red card)	Report	1× (yellow card) 2× (suspension)	Jane Sandanski Arena, Skopje; Attendance: 207; Referees: Sekulić, Jovandić (SRB)

28 June 2024; 20:30	Switzerland	25–30	Portugal	Jane Sandanski Arena, Skopje; Attendance: 93; Referees: Gheisarian, Gheisarian (IRI)
28 June 2024; 20:30	Bucher, Riner 5	(15–13)	Sequeira 10	Jane Sandanski Arena, Skopje; Attendance: 93; Referees: Gheisarian, Gheisarian (IRI)
28 June 2024; 20:30	4× (suspension)	Report	1× (yellow card) 2× (suspension)	Jane Sandanski Arena, Skopje; Attendance: 93; Referees: Gheisarian, Gheisarian (IRI)

=== Semifinals ===
28 June 2024; 18:00	Netherlands	24–28	Hungary	Boris Trajkovski Sports Center, Skopje; Attendance: 259; Referees: Braseth, Sundet (NOR)
28 June 2024; 18:00	Bakker 8	(15–12)	Faragó 6	Boris Trajkovski Sports Center, Skopje; Attendance: 259; Referees: Braseth, Sundet (NOR)
28 June 2024; 18:00	1× (yellow card) 2× (suspension)	Report	2× (suspension)	Boris Trajkovski Sports Center, Skopje; Attendance: 259; Referees: Braseth, Sundet (NOR)

28 June 2024; 20:30	France	32–26	Denmark	Boris Trajkovski Sports Center, Skopje; Attendance: 249; Referees: García, Paolantoni (ARG)
28 June 2024; 20:30	E. Borg 5	(16–14)	Bang 8	Boris Trajkovski Sports Center, Skopje; Attendance: 249; Referees: García, Paolantoni (ARG)
28 June 2024; 20:30	1× (suspension)	Report	1× (suspension)	Boris Trajkovski Sports Center, Skopje; Attendance: 249; Referees: García, Paolantoni (ARG)

=== Seventh place game ===
30 June 2024; 10:00	Iceland	29–26	Switzerland	Boris Trajkovski Sports Center, Skopje; Attendance: 63; Referees: García, Paolantoni (ARG)
30 June 2024; 10:00	Jóhannsdóttir 7	(14–12)	Riner 5	Boris Trajkovski Sports Center, Skopje; Attendance: 63; Referees: García, Paolantoni (ARG)
30 June 2024; 10:00	1× (yellow card) 1× (suspension)	Report	1× (yellow card) 1× (suspension)	Boris Trajkovski Sports Center, Skopje; Attendance: 63; Referees: García, Paolantoni (ARG)

=== Fifth place game ===
30 June 2024; 12:15	Sweden	25–26	Portugal	Boris Trajkovski Sports Center, Skopje; Attendance: 128; Referees: Reyes, Zuñiga (CUB)
30 June 2024; 12:15	Holgersson 5	(16–13)	Sequeira 8	Boris Trajkovski Sports Center, Skopje; Attendance: 128; Referees: Reyes, Zuñiga (CUB)
30 June 2024; 12:15	1× (yellow card) 1× (suspension)	Report	2× (suspension)	Boris Trajkovski Sports Center, Skopje; Attendance: 128; Referees: Reyes, Zuñiga (CUB)

=== Third place game ===
30 June 2024; 14:45	Netherlands	34–28	Denmark	Boris Trajkovski Sports Center, Skopje; Attendance: 248; Referees: Correa, Correa (DEN)
30 June 2024; 14:45	Van Maurik 9	(18–13)	Bang 7	Boris Trajkovski Sports Center, Skopje; Attendance: 248; Referees: Correa, Correa (DEN)
30 June 2024; 14:45	2× (suspension)	Report	1× (suspension)	Boris Trajkovski Sports Center, Skopje; Attendance: 248; Referees: Correa, Correa (DEN)

=== Final ===
30 June 2024; 17:30	Hungary	26–29	France	Boris Trajkovski Sports Center, Skopje; Attendance: 438; Referees: Sekulić, Jovandić (SRB)
30 June 2024; 17:30	Faragó 6	(13–14)	Errard, Pintat 8	Boris Trajkovski Sports Center, Skopje; Attendance: 438; Referees: Sekulić, Jovandić (SRB)
30 June 2024; 17:30	2× (suspension)	Report	2× (suspension)	Boris Trajkovski Sports Center, Skopje; Attendance: 438; Referees: Sekulić, Jovandić (SRB)

== Final ranking ==
Rank	Team
1st place, gold medalist(s)	France
2nd place, silver medalist(s)	Hungary
3rd place, bronze medalist(s)	Netherlands
4	Denmark
5	Portugal
6	Sweden
7	Iceland
8	Switzerland
9	Germany
10	Norway
11	Romania
12	Montenegro
13	Egypt
14	South Korea
15	China
16	North Macedonia
17	Spain
18	Angola
19	Brazil
20	Japan
21	Argentina
22	Serbia
23	Guinea
24	Tunisia
25	Czech Republic
26	Chinese Taipei
27	Iran
28	Uzbekistan
29	Chile
30	United States
31	Algeria
32	Mexico

== Statistics and awards ==
=== Top goalscorers ===
Rank	Name	Goals	Shots	%
1	(Montenegro) Jelena Vukčević	74	102	73
2	(Portugal) Constança Sequeira	62	103	60
3	(Angola) Bernardeth Belo	60	120	50
4	(Iran) Fatemeh Merikh	56	91	62
5	(Uzbekistan) Sevinch Erkabaeva	55	135	41
6	(Denmark) Matilde Vestergaard	51	66	77
7	(Denmark) Clara Bang	47	62	76
8	(Iceland) Lilja Ágústsdóttir	45	59	76
9	(Egypt) Mariam Omar	44	62	71
10	(Netherlands) Alieke van Maurik	42	82	51
10	(Argentina) Sofia Gull	42	80	53

Source: IHF

=== Top goalkeepers ===
Rank	Name	%	Saves	Shots
1	(Japan) Yukiha Horiuchi	52.3	22	42
2	(Norway) Kadija Mårdalen	43.4	33	76
3	(Romania) Ana Cristea	42.6	38	89
4	(Hungary) Klára Zaj	39.3	68	173
5	(Serbia) Mina Savić	38.4	20	52
6	(Sweden) Ida Wall	37.9	22	58
7	(Netherlands) Bianca Schanssema	36.8	76	206
8	(Portugal) Matilda Rosa	36.7	78	2012
8	(Chinese Taipei) Hsin Yun-wu	36.7	22	30
10	(Iceland) Lilja Ágústsdóttir	36.6	22	60

Source: IHF

=== All-Star Team ===
The all-star team was announced on 30 June 2024.

Position	Player
Goalkeeper	(Hungary) Klára Zaj
Right wing	(France) Manon Errard
Right back	(Netherlands) Alieke van Maurik
Centre back	(Iceland) Elín Klara Þorkelsdóttir
Left back	(Hungary) Lea Faragó
Left wing	(Denmark) Matilde Vestergaard
Pivot	(France) Lilou Pintat
MVP	(France) Lylou Borg

2024 Junior Women's World Champions

France
First title

Team roster: Alix Tignon, Romane Le Huault-Parc, Zazie Samzun, Nina Dury, Louane Texier, Séphora Genyah, Manon Errard, Emma Tuccella, Clémence Nkindanda, Lilou Pintat, Enola Borg, Assa Sissoko Dabo, Nina Perret, Lina Colinot, Alice Monteillet, Eva Mbata, Fatou Karamoko, Lylou Borg
Head coach: Éric Baradat

== See also ==
- 2024 Women's Youth World Handball Championship
