= 1981 Women's Junior World Handball Championship =

1981 Junior World Championship
Tournament details
- Host country: Canada
- Dates: October 17–25
- Teams: 11 (from 3 confederations)

Final positions
- Champions: Soviet Union (2nd title)
- Runners-up: Yugoslavia
- Third place: West Germany
- Fourth place: South Korea

Tournament statistics
- Matches played: 35
- Goals scored: 1,401 (40.03 per match)

The 1981 Women's Junior World Handball Championship was the 3rd edition of the tournament which took place in Canada from 17 to 25 October.

Eleven teams competed in the competition from three continents with three nations debuting in the competition. The gold medal went to the Soviet Union who finished top of the final group round-robin after winning their four games which included a two goal win over second place Yugoslavia. West Germany finished in third place.

== Group stage ==
=== Group A ===
Team	Pld	W	D	L	GF	GA	GD	Pts
Soviet Union	2	2	0	0	69	27	+42	4
West Germany	2	1	0	1	44	36	+8	2
Italy	2	0	0	2	22	72	−50	0

October 17	Soviet Union	44–11	Italy	Canadian Forces Base, St. Jean and College Sherbrooke, Sherbrooke

October 18	West Germany	28–11	Italy	Canadian Forces Base, St. Jean and College Sherbrooke, Sherbrooke

October 19	Soviet Union	25–16	West Germany	Canadian Forces Base, St. Jean and College Sherbrooke, Sherbrooke

=== Group B ===
Team	Pld	W	D	L	GF	GA	GD	Pts
Yugoslavia	3	3	0	0	89	37	+52	6
South Korea	3	2	0	1	79	55	+24	4
Netherlands	3	1	0	2	49	52	−3	2
United States	3	0	0	3	24	97	−73	0

October 17	Yugoslavia	35–7	United States	Canadian Forces Base, St. Jean and College Sherbrooke, Sherbrooke

October 17	South Korea	19–17	Netherlands	Canadian Forces Base, St. Jean and College Sherbrooke, Sherbrooke

October 18	Yugoslavia	27–22	South Korea	Canadian Forces Base, St. Jean and College Sherbrooke, Sherbrooke

October 18	Netherlands	24–6	United States	Canadian Forces Base, St. Jean and College Sherbrooke, Sherbrooke

October 19	South Korea	38–11	United States	Canadian Forces Base, St. Jean and College Sherbrooke, Sherbrooke

October 19	Yugoslavia	27–8	Netherlands	Canadian Forces Base, St. Jean and College Sherbrooke, Sherbrooke

=== Group C ===
Team	Pld	W	D	L	GF	GA	GD	Pts
Denmark	3	3	0	0	60	47	+13	6
China	3	2	0	1	82	54	+28	4
Canada	3	1	0	2	50	58	−8	2
France	3	0	0	3	37	70	−33	0

October 17	Canada	19–14	France	Canadian Forces Base, St. Jean and College Sherbrooke, Sherbrooke

October 17	Denmark	26–21	China	Canadian Forces Base, St. Jean and College Sherbrooke, Sherbrooke

October 18	China	32–11	France	Canadian Forces Base, St. Jean and College Sherbrooke, Sherbrooke

October 18	Denmark	15–14	Canada	Canadian Forces Base, St. Jean and College Sherbrooke, Sherbrooke

October 19	China	29–17	Canada	Canadian Forces Base, St. Jean and College Sherbrooke, Sherbrooke

October 19	Denmark	19–12	France	Canadian Forces Base, St. Jean and College Sherbrooke, Sherbrooke

== Final round ==
=== Group 7-11 ===
Team	Pld	W	D	L	GF	GA	GD	Pts
France	4	3	0	1	93	62	+31	6
Canada	4	3	0	1	80	56	+24	6
Netherlands	4	2	0	2	69	54	+15	4
Italy	4	2	0	2	74	77	−3	4
United States	4	0	0	4	39	106	−67	0

October 21	France	27–17	Italy	Canadian Forces Base, St. Jean and College Sherbrooke, Sherbrooke

October 21	Canada	23–11	United States	Canadian Forces Base, St. Jean and College Sherbrooke, Sherbrooke

October 22	Italy	25–9	United States	Canadian Forces Base, St. Jean and College Sherbrooke, Sherbrooke

October 22	Netherlands	17–12	Canada	Canadian Forces Base, St. Jean and College Sherbrooke, Sherbrooke

October 24	Canada	26–14	Italy	Canadian Forces Base, St. Jean and College Sherbrooke, Sherbrooke

October 24	France	18–13	Netherlands	Canadian Forces Base, St. Jean and College Sherbrooke, Sherbrooke

October 25	France	34–13	United States	Canadian Forces Base, St. Jean and College Sherbrooke, Sherbrooke

October 25	Italy	18–15	Netherlands	Canadian Forces Base, St. Jean and College Sherbrooke, Sherbrooke

=== Group 1-6 ===
Team	Pld	W	D	L	GF	GA	GD	Pts
Soviet Union	5	5	0	0	138	93	+45	10
Yugoslavia	5	4	0	1	125	95	+30	8
West Germany	5	3	0	2	84	86	−2	6
South Korea	5	2	0	3	114	120	−6	4
Denmark	5	1	0	4	91	110	−19	2
China	5	0	0	5	89	137	−48	0

October 21	Soviet Union	32–14	China	Canadian Forces Base, St. Jean and College Sherbrooke, Sherbrooke

October 21	Yugoslavia	21–13	West Germany	Canadian Forces Base, St. Jean and College Sherbrooke, Sherbrooke

October 21	South Korea	28–20	Denmark	Canadian Forces Base, St. Jean and College Sherbrooke, Sherbrooke

October 22	Soviet Union	34–24	South Korea	Canadian Forces Base, St. Jean and College Sherbrooke, Sherbrooke

October 22	West Germany	19–17	China	Canadian Forces Base, St. Jean and College Sherbrooke, Sherbrooke
October 22		(8–8)		Canadian Forces Base, St. Jean and College Sherbrooke, Sherbrooke

October 22	Yugoslavia	22–18	Denmark	Canadian Forces Base, St. Jean and College Sherbrooke, Sherbrooke

October 24	West Germany	19–12	South Korea	Canadian Forces Base, St. Jean and College Sherbrooke, Sherbrooke

October 24	Soviet Union	22–16	Denmark	Canadian Forces Base, St. Jean and College Sherbrooke, Sherbrooke

October 24	Yugoslavia	32–17	China	Canadian Forces Base, St. Jean and College Sherbrooke, Sherbrooke

October 25	West Germany	17–11	Denmark	Canadian Forces Base, St. Jean and College Sherbrooke, Sherbrooke

October 25	South Korea	28–20	China	Canadian Forces Base, St. Jean and College Sherbrooke, Sherbrooke

October 25	Soviet Union	25–23	Yugoslavia	Canadian Forces Base, St. Jean and College Sherbrooke, Sherbrooke; Attendance: 1000
October 25		(11–13)		Canadian Forces Base, St. Jean and College Sherbrooke, Sherbrooke; Attendance: 1000

== Ranking ==
The final rankings from the 1981 edition:

Rank	Team
Gold medal	Soviet Union
Silver medal	Yugoslavia
Bronze medal	West Germany
4	South Korea
5	Denmark
6	China
7	France
8	Canada
9	Netherlands
10	Italy
11	United States
