= Clara Bang =

Danish handball player (born 2004)

Personal information
- Full name: Clara Rønde Haugaard Bang
- Nationality: Danish
- Born: 30 April 2004 (age 22) Skanderborg, Denmark
- Height: 1.76 m (5 ft 9 in)

Sport
- Sport: Handball
- Position: Right back
- Current club: Nykøbing Falster Håndboldklub
- Number: 3

Youth career
- Years: Team
- 2020–2023: Skanderborg Håndbold

Senior clubs
- Years: Team
- 2023–2025: Skanderborg Håndbold
- 2025–: Nykøbing Falster Håndboldklub
National team
Years	Team	Apps	(Gls)
2025–	Denmark	6	(6)
- Updated on 4 March 2026

Clara Rønde Haugaard Bang (born 30 April 2004) is a Danish female handball player for Nykøbing Falster Håndboldklub and the Danish national team.

She has played at Skanderborg Håndbold since she was four years old. In 2023 she made her debut for the first team. In the 2024–25 season she became a regular part of the team, and even became a starter on the right back position. In 2025 she joined Nykøbing Falster Håndboldklub on a two-year contract.

In October 2024, she was selected for the Danish national team for the Posten Cup 2024 in Larvik. However, Bang didn't play due to small injury complications. She was also part of the extended Danish squad for the 2024 European Women's Handball Championship, but was not included in the final selection.
