= United States women's national junior handball team =

United States

Information
- Association: USA Team Handball
- Coach: Thomas Baeckmann

Colours
1st	2nd

Results

IHF U-20 World Championship
- Appearances: 5 (First in 1979)
- Best result: 11th (1981)
- Last updated on Unknown.

The United States women's junior national handball team is the national under-19 handball team of the United States. Controlled by USA Team Handball it represents the country in international matches.

== World Championship record ==
- 1979 – 12th place
- 1981 – 11th place
- 2022 – 31st place
- 2024 – 30th place
- 2026 – 29th place
