= 1989 Women's Junior World Handball Championship =

Seventh edition of the junior World Championship

1989 Junior World Championship
Tournament details
- Host country: Nigeria
- Dates: September 22–October 1
- Teams: 15 (from 3 confederations)

Final positions
- Champions: Soviet Union (6th title)
- Runner-up: South Korea
- Third place: Bulgaria
- Fourth place: Yugoslavia

Tournament statistics
- Matches played: 48

The 1989 Women's Junior World Handball Championship was the seventh edition of the tournament which took place in Nigeria from 22 September to 1 October 1989. Fifteen teams competed in the competition from three continents with Algeria, Switzerland and Turkey making their first appearance in a tournament.

In the final, the Soviet Union took home their sixth gold medal and their fourth in a row after defeating South Korea by three goals. Bulgaria claimed their first junior medal after defeating Yugoslavia for third.

== First round ==
=== Group A ===
Team	Pld	W	D	L	GF	GA	GD	Pts
Soviet Union	2	2	0	0	68	41	+27	4
Japan	2	1	0	1	44	48	−4	2
West Germany	2	0	0	2	37	60	−23	0

September 1989	Japan	23–17	West Germany	Nigeria

September 1989	Soviet Union	31–21	Japan	Nigeria

September 1989	Soviet Union	37–20	West Germany	Nigeria

=== Group B ===
Team	Pld	W	D	L	GF	GA	GD	Pts
Bulgaria	3	3	0	0	79	58	+21	6
Sweden	3	2	0	1	69	62	+7	4
Denmark	3	1	0	2	73	53	+20	2
Turkey	3	0	0	3	47	95	−48	0

September 1989	Sweden	27–18	Turkey	Nigeria

September 1989	Bulgaria	22–18	Denmark	Nigeria

September 1989	Denmark	35–10	Turkey	Nigeria

September 1989	Bulgaria	24–21	Sweden	Nigeria

24 September	Bulgaria	33–19	Turkey	Nigeria

24 September	Sweden	21–20	Denmark	Nigeria

=== Group C ===
Team	Pld	W	D	L	GF	GA	GD	Pts
South Korea	3	3	0	0	106	67	+39	6
China	3	2	0	1	84	57	+27	4
Algeria	3	1	0	2	48	82	−34	2
Austria	3	0	0	3	52	84	−32	0

September 1989	China	30–13	Algeria	Nigeria

September 1989	South Korea	37–25	Austria	Nigeria

September 1989	South Korea	37–16	Algeria	Nigeria

September 1989	China	28–12	Austria	Nigeria

September 1989	Algeria	19–15	Austria	Nigeria

September 1989	South Korea	32–26	China	Nigeria

=== Group D ===
Team	Pld	W	D	L	GF	GA	GD	Pts
Yugoslavia	3	3	0	0	79	57	+22	6
Spain	3	2	0	1	63	61	+2	4
Nigeria	3	1	0	2	69	59	+10	2
Switzerland	3	0	0	3	55	89	−34	0

22 September	Spain	26–17	Switzerland	Nigeria

22 September	Yugoslavia	23–18	Nigeria	Nigeria

23 September	Spain	20–19	Nigeria	Nigeria

23 September	Yugoslavia	31–22	Switzerland	Nigeria

24 September	Nigeria	32–16	Switzerland	Nigeria

24 September	Yugoslavia	25–17	Spain	Nigeria

== Second round ==
=== Group I ===
Team	Pld	W	D	L	GF	GA	GD	Pts
Soviet Union	5	5	0	0	158	95	+63	10
Bulgaria	5	4	0	1	113	105	+8	8
Sweden	5	3	0	2	113	110	+3	6
Denmark	5	2	0	3	103	113	−10	4
Japan	5	1	0	4	100	119	−19	2
West Germany	5	0	0	5	93	138	−45	0

September 1989	Sweden	26–20	Japan	Nigeria

September 1989	Soviet Union	34–19	Denmark	Nigeria

September 1989	Bulgaria	28–23	West Germany	Nigeria

September 1989	Soviet Union	29–19	Sweden	Nigeria

September 1989	Denmark	24–16	West Germany	Nigeria

September 1989	Bulgaria	23–16	Japan	Nigeria

September 1989	Soviet Union	27–16	Bulgaria	Nigeria

September 1989	Sweden	26–17	West Germany	Nigeria

September 1989	Denmark	22–20	Japan	Nigeria

=== Group II ===
Team	Pld	W	D	L	GF	GA	GD	Pts
South Korea	5	5	0	0	174	113	+61	10
Yugoslavia	5	4	0	1	118	106	+12	8
China	5	3	0	2	132	104	+28	6
Spain	5	2	0	3	98	122	−24	4
Nigeria	5	1	0	4	114	123	−9	2
Algeria	5	0	0	5	77	145	−68	0

September 1989	China	27–13	Spain	Nigeria

September 1989	South Korea	35–25	Nigeria	Nigeria

September 1989	Yugoslavia	22–17	Austria	Nigeria

September 1989	South Korea	35–20	Spain	Nigeria

September 1989	Nigeria	28–15	Algeria	Nigeria

September 1989	Yugoslavia	22–19	China	Nigeria

September 1989	South Korea	35–26	Yugoslavia	Nigeria

September 1989	Spain	28–16	Algeria	Nigeria

September 1989	China	30–24	Nigeria	Nigeria

=== Thirteenth place ===
Team	Pld	W	D	L	GF	GA	GD	Pts
Switzerland	2	2	0	0	47	42	+5	4
Austria	2	1	0	1	53	47	+6	2
Turkey	2	0	0	2	40	51	−11	0

26 September	Switzerland	21–19	Turkey	Nigeria

September 1989	Austria	30–21	Turkey	Nigeria

29 September	Switzerland	26–23	Austria	Nigeria

== Placement matches ==
=== Eleventh-place game ===
1 October 1989	West Germany	24–10	Algeria	Nigeria

=== Ninth-place game ===
1 October 1989	Nigeria	34–22	Japan	Nigeria

=== Seventh-place game ===
1 October 1989	Denmark	30–19	Spain	Nigeria

=== Fifth-place game ===
1 October 1989	Sweden	27–26	China	Nigeria

=== Third-place game ===
1 October 1989	Bulgaria	27–18	Yugoslavia	Nigeria

=== Final ===
1 October 1989	Soviet Union	26–23	South Korea	Nigeria

== Ranking ==
The final rankings from the 1989 edition:

Rank	Team
Gold medal	Soviet Union
Silver medal	South Korea
Bronze medal	Bulgaria
4	Yugoslavia
5	Sweden
6	China
7	Denmark
8	Spain
9	Nigeria
10	Japan
11	West Germany
12	Algeria
13	Switzerland
14	Austria
15	Turkey
