= 1977 Women's Junior World Handball Championship =

1977 Junior World Championship
Tournament details
- Host country: Romania
- Dates: September 30–October 7
- Teams: 14 (from 2 confederations)

Final positions
- Champions: Yugoslavia (1st title)
- Runner-up: Soviet Union
- Third place: Romania
- Fourth place: East Germany

Tournament statistics
- Matches played: 37
- Goals scored: 973 (26.3 per match)

The 1977 Women's Junior World Handball Championship was the first edition of the Women's Junior World Handball Championship with the tournament taking place in Romania from 30 September to 7 October 1977.

Fourteen teams competed in the competition with almost all of the teams bar Congo coming from the European continent. After finishing top of the second round groups, Yugoslavia became the first nation to win the title as they defeated the Soviet Union 16-13 in the final. Romania came in third place after they defeated East Germany by a single goal in the third-place playoff.

== Group stage ==
=== Group A ===
Pos	Team	Pld	W	D	L	GF	GA	GD	Pts	Qualification
1	Soviet Union	3	3	0	0	57	32	+25	6	Placement Round
2	Czechoslovakia	3	2	0	1	40	41	−1	4	Placement Round
3	Netherlands	3	1	0	2	37	44	−7	2	
4	Congo	3	0	0	3	37	54	−17	0	

Source: Todor66

1977	Soviet Union	23–14	Congo	Romania

1977	Netherlands	12–16	Czechoslovakia	Romania

1977	Netherlands	16–11	Congo	Romania

1977	Soviet Union	17–9	Czechoslovakia	Romania

1977	Czechoslovakia	15–12	Congo	Romania

1977	Netherlands	9–17	Soviet Union	Romania

=== Group B ===
Team	Pld	W	D	L	GF	GA	GD	Pts
Romania	3	3	0	0	56	36	+20	6
Poland	3	1	1	1	52	49	+3	3
West Germany	3	1	1	1	36	38	−2	3
France	3	0	0	3	26	47	−21	0

1977	France	6–21	Romania	Romania

1977	Poland	16–16	West Germany	Romania

1977	France	7–8	West Germany	Romania

1977	Poland	18–20	Romania	Romania

1977	Poland	18–13	France	Romania

1977	West Germany	12–15	Romania	Romania

=== Group C ===
Team	Pld	W	D	L	GF	GA	GD	Pts
Hungary	2	2	0	0	31	9	+22	4
Norway	2	1	0	1	28	22	+6	2
Austria	2	0	0	2	16	44	−28	0

1977	Austria	5–20	Hungary	Romania

1977	Norway	4–11	Hungary	Romania

1977	Austria	11–24	Norway	Romania

=== Group D ===
Team	Pld	W	D	L	GF	GA	GD	Pts
Yugoslavia	2	2	0	0	28	25	+3	4
East Germany	2	1	0	1	27	25	+2	2
Denmark	2	0	0	2	27	32	−5	0

1977	East Germany	16–13	Denmark	Romania

1977	Yugoslavia	16–14	Denmark	Romania

1977	East Germany	11–12	Yugoslavia	Romania

== Placement round ==
=== Group I ===
Team	Pld	W	D	L	GF	GA	GD	Pts
Soviet Union	3	3	0	0	46	31	+15	6
Romania	3	2	0	1	41	41	0	4
Poland	3	1	0	2	45	45	0	2
Czechoslovakia	3	0	0	3	28	43	−15	0

1977	Soviet Union	15–11	Poland	Romania

1977	Czechoslovakia	9–10	Romania	Romania

1977	Czechoslovakia	10–16	Poland	Romania

1977	Soviet Union	14–11	Romania	Romania

=== Group II ===
Team	Pld	W	D	L	GF	GA	GD	Pts
Yugoslavia	3	3	0	0	50	35	+15	6
East Germany	3	2	0	1	36	28	+8	4
Hungary	3	1	0	2	30	35	−5	2
Norway	3	0	0	3	25	43	−18	0

1977	East Germany	13–8	Hungary	Romania

1977	Yugoslavia	20–13	Norway	Romania

1977	Norway	8–12	East Germany	Romania

1977	Hungary	11–18	Yugoslavia	Romania

=== Group III ===
Team	Pld	W	D	L	GF	GA	GD	Pts
Netherlands	2	2	0	0	24	17	+7	4
Congo	2	1	0	1	34	26	+8	2
Austria	2	0	0	2	16	31	−15	0

1977	Congo	23–10	Austria	Romania

1977	Netherlands	8–6	Austria	Romania

=== Group IV ===
Team	Pld	W	D	L	GF	GA	GD	Pts
Denmark	2	1	1	0	19	16	+3	3
West Germany	2	1	1	0	17	16	+1	3
France	2	0	0	2	14	18	−4	0

1977	France	7–10	Denmark	Romania

1977	West Germany	9–9	Denmark	Romania

== Placement matches ==
=== Thirteenth place game ===
1977	France	10–6	Austria	Romania

=== Eleventh place game ===
1977	West Germany	20–16	Congo	Romania

=== Ninth place game ===
1977	Netherlands	17–15	Denmark	Romania

=== Seventh place game ===
1977	Norway	16–15	Czechoslovakia	Romania

=== Fifth place game ===
1977	Poland	10–9	Hungary	Romania

=== Third place game ===
1977	Romania	16–15	East Germany	Romania

=== Final ===
1977	Yugoslavia	16–13	Soviet Union	Romania

== Ranking ==
Rank	Team
Gold medal	Yugoslavia
Silver medal	Soviet Union
Bronze medal	Romania
4	East Germany
5	Poland
6	Hungary
7	Norway
8	Czechoslovakia
9	Netherlands
10	Denmark
11	West Germany
12	Congo
13	France
14	Austria
