= 1979 Women's Junior World Handball Championship =

1979 Junior World Championship
Tournament details
- Host country: Yugoslavia
- Dates: October 13–23
- Teams: 13 (from 3 confederations)

Final positions
- Champions: Soviet Union (1st title)
- Runners-up: East Germany
- Third place: Yugoslavia
- Fourth place: Hungary

Tournament statistics
- Matches played: 46
- Goals scored: 1,365 (29.67 per match)

The 1979 Women's Junior World Handball Championship was the 2nd edition of the tournament and took place from 13 to 23 October in the Socialist Autonomous Province of Kosovo in Yugoslavia.

The title was won by the Soviet Union who finished on top after winning four of their five games with East Germany finishing in second place.

== Group stage ==
=== Group A ===
| Team | Pld | W | D | L | GF | GA | GD | Pts |
|---|---|---|---|---|---|---|---|---|
| Soviet Union | 3 | 3 | 0 | 0 | 62 | 34 | +28 | 6 |
| Hungary | 3 | 2 | 0 | 1 | 50 | 42 | +8 | 4 |
| West Germany | 3 | 1 | 0 | 2 | 35 | 46 | −11 | 2 |
| Japan | 3 | 0 | 0 | 3 | 34 | 59 | −25 | 0 |

| 1979 | Hungary | 20–13 | Japan | SAP Kosovo, Yugoslavia |

| 1979 | Soviet Union | 19–10 | West Germany | SAP Kosovo, Yugoslavia |

| 1979 | Soviet Union | 25–13 | Japan | SAP Kosovo, Yugoslavia |

| 1979 | Hungary | 19–11 | West Germany | SAP Kosovo, Yugoslavia |

| 1979 | West Germany | 14–8 | Japan | SAP Kosovo, Yugoslavia |

| 1979 | Soviet Union | 18–11 | Hungary | SAP Kosovo, Yugoslavia |

=== Group B ===
| Team | Pld | W | D | L | GF | GA | GD | Pts |
|---|---|---|---|---|---|---|---|---|
| Yugoslavia | 4 | 4 | 0 | 0 | 102 | 35 | +67 | 8 |
| France | 4 | 3 | 0 | 1 | 55 | 54 | +1 | 6 |
| Norway | 4 | 2 | 0 | 2 | 61 | 42 | +19 | 4 |
| Austria | 4 | 1 | 0 | 3 | 31 | 56 | −25 | 2 |
| Italy | 4 | 0 | 0 | 4 | 34 | 96 | −62 | 0 |

Source: FFHB

| 13-10-1979 | Yugoslavia | 18–5 | Austria | Gjilan |

| 13-10-1979 | France | 21–12 | Italy | Gjilan |
| 13-10-1979 | | (9-6) | | Gjilan |

| 14-10-1979 | Norway | 17–3 | Austria | Gjakova |

| 14-10-1979 | Yugoslavia | 41–7 | Italy | Gjakova |

| 15-10-1979 | Austria | 14–8 | Italy | Mitrovica |

| 15-10-1979 | France | 12–10 | Norway | Mitrovica |
| 15-10-1979 | | (4-5) | | Mitrovica |

| 16-10-1979 | Norway | 20–7 | Italy | Prizren |

| 16-10-1979 | Yugoslavia | 23–9 | France | Prizren |
| 16-10-1979 | | (12-3) | | Prizren |

| 17-10-1979 | Yugoslavia | 20–14 | Norway | Uroševac |

| 17-10-1979 | France | 13–9 (5-5) | Austria | Uroševac |

=== Group C ===
| Team | Pld | W | D | L | GF | GA | GD | Pts |
|---|---|---|---|---|---|---|---|---|
| East Germany | 3 | 3 | 0 | 0 | 68 | 29 | +39 | 6 |
| Denmark | 3 | 2 | 0 | 1 | 60 | 34 | +26 | 4 |
| Netherlands | 3 | 1 | 0 | 2 | 46 | 44 | +2 | 2 |
| United States | 3 | 0 | 0 | 3 | 23 | 90 | −67 | 0 |

| 1979 | Netherlands | 26–6 | United States | SAP Kosovo, Yugoslavia |

| 1979 | East Germany | 18–8 | Denmark | SAP Kosovo, Yugoslavia |

| 1979 | Denmark | 18–9 | Netherlands | SAP Kosovo, Yugoslavia |

| 1979 | East Germany | 30–10 | United States | SAP Kosovo, Yugoslavia |

| 1979 | East Germany | 20–11 | Netherlands | SAP Kosovo, Yugoslavia |

| 1979 | Denmark | 34–7 | United States | SAP Kosovo, Yugoslavia |

== Final round ==
=== Group 7-12 ===
| Team | Pld | W | D | L | GF | GA | GD | Pts |
|---|---|---|---|---|---|---|---|---|
| Netherlands | 5 | 4 | 0 | 1 | 73 | 48 | +25 | 8 |
| Norway | 5 | 4 | 0 | 1 | 83 | 53 | +30 | 8 |
| West Germany | 5 | 3 | 0 | 2 | 72 | 42 | +30 | 6 |
| Japan | 5 | 3 | 0 | 2 | 96 | 77 | +19 | 6 |
| Austria | 5 | 1 | 0 | 4 | 36 | 76 | −40 | 2 |
| United States | 5 | 0 | 0 | 5 | 55 | 119 | −64 | 0 |

| 1979 | Japan | 21–15 | Netherlands | SAP Kosovo, Yugoslavia |

| 1979 | West Germany | 19–4 | Austria | SAP Kosovo, Yugoslavia |

| 1979 | Norway | 24–14 | United States | SAP Kosovo, Yugoslavia |

| 1979 | Netherlands | 11–6 | Norway | SAP Kosovo, Yugoslavia |

| 1979 | Japan | 17–9 | Austria | SAP Kosovo, Yugoslavia |

| 1979 | West Germany | 23–7 | United States | SAP Kosovo, Yugoslavia |

| 1979 | Norway | 11–6 | West Germany | SAP Kosovo, Yugoslavia |

| 1979 | Japan | 31–14 | United States | SAP Kosovo, Yugoslavia |

| 1979 | Netherlands | 9–5 | Austria | SAP Kosovo, Yugoslavia |

| 1979 | Netherlands | 12–10 | West Germany | SAP Kosovo, Yugoslavia |

| 1979 | Austria | 15–14 | United States | SAP Kosovo, Yugoslavia |

| 1979 | Norway | 25–19 | Japan | SAP Kosovo, Yugoslavia |

=== Group 1-6 ===
| Team | Pld | W | D | L | GF | GA | GD | Pts |
|---|---|---|---|---|---|---|---|---|
| Soviet Union | 5 | 4 | 0 | 1 | 91 | 61 | +30 | 8 |
| East Germany | 5 | 3 | 1 | 1 | 87 | 59 | +28 | 7 |
| Yugoslavia | 5 | 3 | 1 | 1 | 84 | 65 | +19 | 7 |
| Hungary | 5 | 3 | 0 | 2 | 78 | 71 | +7 | 6 |
| Denmark | 5 | 1 | 0 | 4 | 65 | 81 | −16 | 2 |
| France | 5 | 0 | 0 | 5 | 45 | 113 | −68 | 0 |

Source: IHF, FFHB

| 1979 | Soviet Union | 24–9 | France | SAP Kosovo, Yugoslavia |
| 1979 | | (14-3) | | SAP Kosovo, Yugoslavia |

| 1979 | Hungary | 17–13 | East Germany | SAP Kosovo, Yugoslavia |

| 1979 | Yugoslavia | 17–12 | Denmark | SAP Kosovo, Yugoslavia |

| 1979 | Hungary | 17–16 | Denmark | SAP Kosovo, Yugoslavia |

| 1979 | East Germany | 29–9 or 28–9 | France | SAP Kosovo, Yugoslavia |
| 1979 | | (12-2) | | SAP Kosovo, Yugoslavia |

| 1979 | Soviet Union | 18–15 | Yugoslavia | SAP Kosovo, Yugoslavia |

| 1979 | Hungary | 20−8 or 28–9 | France | SAP Kosovo, Yugoslavia |
| 1979 | | (12-2) | | SAP Kosovo, Yugoslavia |

| 1979 | Soviet Union | 19–12 | Denmark | SAP Kosovo, Yugoslavia |

| 1979 | East Germany | 13–13 | Yugoslavia | SAP Kosovo, Yugoslavia |

| 23-10-1979 | Denmark | 17–10 | France | SAP Kosovo, Yugoslavia |
| 23-10-1979 | | (7-4) | | SAP Kosovo, Yugoslavia |

| 23-10-1979 | East Germany | 14–12 | Soviet Union | SAP Kosovo, Yugoslavia |

| 23-10-1979 | Yugoslavia | 16–13 | Hungary | SAP Kosovo, Yugoslavia |

== Ranking ==
The final rankings from the 1979 edition:

| Rank | Team |
|---|---|
| Gold medal | Soviet Union |
| Silver medal | East Germany |
| Bronze medal | Yugoslavia |
| 4 | Hungary |
| 5 | Denmark |
| 6 | France |
| 7 | Netherlands |
| 8 | Norway |
| 9 | West Germany |
| 10 | Japan |
| 11 | Austria |
| 12 | United States |
| 13 | Italy |
