= 2025 European Women's U-19 Handball Championship =

Tournament details
- Host country: Montenegro
- Venues: 3 (in 1 host city)
- Dates: 9–20 July
- Teams: 24 (from 1 confederation)

Final positions
- Champions: Germany (1st title)
- Runners-up: Spain
- Third place: Denmark
- Fourth place: Austria

Official website
- www.eurohandball.com

The 2025 European Women's U-19 Handball Championship was the 15th edition of the European Women's U-19 Handball Championship. The tournament was played in Podgorica, Montenegro, from 9 to 20 July 2025. This edition featured 24 teams for the first time.

Germany won the competition for the first time.

== Host selection ==
- Montenegro

Montenegro won the hosting rights unopposed at an EHF meeting in Oslo on 21 June 2024.

== Expansion ==
After the U-17 Euro was officially expanded to 24 teams, the EHF decided to also expand the U-19 competition to 24 teams also on 23 September 2022.

== Format ==
The tournament consisted of three phases: The first two were played in a round-robin-groups format. The third phase was played in a playoff format with consolations.

In the First phase, 24 teams were drawn into six groups of four.

- The top two teams from each group advanced to the Main round.
- The third- and fourth-placed teams advanced to the Intermediate round.

In the Second phase, all teams were again divided into groups of four, but this time, against the teams that advanced to the same round as them. Each separate round (Main and Intermediate) was played by 12 teams, divided into three groups of four.

- In the Main round, the top two teams from each group and the best two third-placed teams advanced to the quarterfinals. The other four teams advanced to the 9th–16th place playoffs.
- In the Intermediate round, the winners of each group and the best second-placed team advanced to the 9th–16th place playoffs. The other eight teams advanced to the 17th–24th place playoffs.

In the Third phase, the teams were divided into three playoff tiers of eight teams each, with each team playing three more matches there. Each of the three playoffs consisted of four quarterfinals, two semifinals, two consolation semifinals, and four final placement matches.

== Qualification ==
To accommodate 24 teams and fill in the eight extra spots, the EHF decided to not relegate anyone in 2023 and promote the top four teams from each of the two tournaments of the 2023 Women's U-17 EHF Championships.

Competition	Dates	Host	Vacancies	Qualified
Host nation	21 June 2024	(Norway) Oslo	1	Montenegro
Women's 19 EHF EURO 2023	6–16 July 2023	Romania	15	Hungary; Denmark; Romania; Portugal; Sweden; France; Switzerland; Netherlands; Norway; Germany; Czech Republic; Iceland; Serbia; North Macedonia; Croatia
2023 Women's U-17 EHF Championships	5–13 August 2023	(Turkey) Ankara	4	Austria; Turkey; Finland; Poland
2023 Women's U-17 EHF Championships	5–13 August 2023	(Azerbaijan) Baku	4	Spain; Slovenia; Lithuania; Faroe Islands

== Venues ==
The venues are in Podgorica.

2025 European Women's U-19 Handball Championship is located in Montenegro
Bemax Arena; Capacity: 2,244	Morača Sports Center; Capacity: 6,000	Verde Complex; Capacity: 2,100

== Draw ==
The draw was held on 28 January 2025 in Vienna at 11:00 (CET). The draw was conducted by EHF Secretary General, Martin Hausleitner, and Chief Sports Officer, Markus Glaser. As hosts, Montenegro had the right to select their group.

Pot 1	Pot 2	Pot 3	Pot 4
France; Denmark; Germany; Croatia; Hungary; Serbia	Montenegro; Netherlands; Sweden; Norway; Romania; Czech Republic	Switzerland; Portugal; Iceland; North Macedonia; Spain; Austria	Slovenia; Turkey; Lithuania; Finland; Poland; Faroe Islands

== Preliminary round ==
=== Group A ===
Pos	Team	Pld	W	D	L	GF	GA	GD	Pts	Qualification
1	Czech Republic	3	3	0	0	99	72	+27	6	Main round
2	Hungary	3	2	0	1	87	73	+14	4	Main round
3	Poland	3	1	0	2	76	73	+3	2	Intermediate round
4	North Macedonia	3	0	0	3	63	107	−44	0	Intermediate round

Source: EHF
Rules for classification: 1) points; 2) head-to-head points; 3) head-to-head goal difference; 4) head-to-head number of goals scored; 5) Goal difference.

9 July 2025; 14:30	Czech Republic	30–24	Poland	Bemax Arena, Podgorica; Attendance: 35; Referees: Ron Peretz, Niv Schwartz (ISR)
9 July 2025; 14:30	Filípková 7	(16–11)	Schlabs 8	Bemax Arena, Podgorica; Attendance: 35; Referees: Ron Peretz, Niv Schwartz (ISR)
9 July 2025; 14:30	1× (yellow card) 5× (suspension)	Report	1× (yellow card) 2× (suspension)	Bemax Arena, Podgorica; Attendance: 35; Referees: Ron Peretz, Niv Schwartz (ISR)

9 July 2025; 19:30	Hungary	38–21	North Macedonia	Bemax Arena, Podgorica; Attendance: 50; Referees: Lucas Hellbusch, Darnel Jansen (GER)
9 July 2025; 19:30	Fazekas 8	(16–11)	Velkova, Isidora Kotevska 4	Bemax Arena, Podgorica; Attendance: 50; Referees: Lucas Hellbusch, Darnel Jansen (GER)
9 July 2025; 19:30	4× (suspension)	Report	4× (suspension)	Bemax Arena, Podgorica; Attendance: 50; Referees: Lucas Hellbusch, Darnel Jansen (GER)

10 July 2025; 14:30	North Macedonia	18–28	Poland	Bemax Arena, Podgorica; Attendance: 50; Referees: Bruna Correa, Renata Correa (BRA)
10 July 2025; 14:30	Trpeska 4	(8–11)	Zimnicka 6	Bemax Arena, Podgorica; Attendance: 50; Referees: Bruna Correa, Renata Correa (BRA)
10 July 2025; 14:30	1× (yellow card) 6× (suspension)	Report	1× (yellow card) 3× (suspension)	Bemax Arena, Podgorica; Attendance: 50; Referees: Bruna Correa, Renata Correa (BRA)

10 July 2025; 19:30	Hungary	24–28	Czech Republic	Bemax Arena, Podgorica; Attendance: 70; Referees: Mattias Fält, Mikael Holm (SWE)
10 July 2025; 19:30	Fazekas 7	(17–15)	Pejšová, Filípková 7	Bemax Arena, Podgorica; Attendance: 70; Referees: Mattias Fält, Mikael Holm (SWE)
10 July 2025; 19:30	1× (suspension)	Report	2× (suspension)	Bemax Arena, Podgorica; Attendance: 70; Referees: Mattias Fält, Mikael Holm (SWE)

12 July 2025; 19:30	Poland	24–25	Hungary	Morača Arena, Podgorica; Attendance: 60; Referees: Dragana Jakovljevic, Danijella Sando Kovacevic (SRB)
12 July 2025; 19:30	Zimnicka 9	(12–13)	Fazekas 7	Morača Arena, Podgorica; Attendance: 60; Referees: Dragana Jakovljevic, Danijella Sando Kovacevic (SRB)
12 July 2025; 19:30	1× (yellow card) 4× (suspension)	Report	5× (suspension)	Morača Arena, Podgorica; Attendance: 60; Referees: Dragana Jakovljevic, Danijella Sando Kovacevic (SRB)

12 July 2025; 14:30	Czech Republic	41–24	North Macedonia	Morača Arena, Podgorica; Attendance: 80; Referees: Mathilde Cournil, Loriane Lamour (FRA)
12 July 2025; 14:30	Krapková 10	(18–10)	Milenkoska 5	Morača Arena, Podgorica; Attendance: 80; Referees: Mathilde Cournil, Loriane Lamour (FRA)
12 July 2025; 14:30	2× (yellow card) 2× (suspension)	Report	9× (suspension) 1× (red card)	Morača Arena, Podgorica; Attendance: 80; Referees: Mathilde Cournil, Loriane Lamour (FRA)

=== Group B ===
Pos	Team	Pld	W	D	L	GF	GA	GD	Pts	Qualification
1	Denmark	3	3	0	0	99	77	+22	6	Main round
2	Montenegro (H)	3	2	0	1	98	90	+8	4	Main round
3	Iceland	3	1	0	2	87	94	−7	2	Intermediate round
4	Lithuania	3	0	0	3	84	107	−23	0	Intermediate round

Source: EHF
Rules for classification: 1) points; 2) head-to-head points; 3) head-to-head goal difference; 4) head-to-head number of goals scored; 5) Goal difference.
(H) Hosts

9 July 2025; 12:00	Denmark	31–25	Iceland	Bemax Arena, Podgorica; Attendance: 100; Referees: Dragana Jakovljevic, Danijella Sando Kovacevic (SRB)
9 July 2025; 12:00	Plougstrup 7	(15–10)	Guðmundsdóttir 5	Bemax Arena, Podgorica; Attendance: 100; Referees: Dragana Jakovljevic, Danijella Sando Kovacevic (SRB)
9 July 2025; 12:00	7× (suspension) 1× (red card)	Report	6× (suspension)	Bemax Arena, Podgorica; Attendance: 100; Referees: Dragana Jakovljevic, Danijella Sando Kovacevic (SRB)

9 July 2025; 17:00	Montenegro	36–31	Lithuania	Bemax Arena, Podgorica; Attendance: 302; Referees: Mattias Fält, Mikael Holm (SWE)
9 July 2025; 17:00	Lekic 9	(16–13)	Pilikauskaite 10	Bemax Arena, Podgorica; Attendance: 302; Referees: Mattias Fält, Mikael Holm (SWE)
9 July 2025; 17:00	3× (suspension)	Report	4× (suspension)	Bemax Arena, Podgorica; Attendance: 302; Referees: Mattias Fält, Mikael Holm (SWE)

10 July 2025; 12:00	Iceland	31–27	Lithuania	Bemax Arena, Podgorica; Attendance: 80; Referees: Mathilde Cournil, Loriane Lamour (FRA)
10 July 2025; 12:00	Þórhallsdóttir, Pálsdóttir 6	(14–11)	Pilikauskaite 12	Bemax Arena, Podgorica; Attendance: 80; Referees: Mathilde Cournil, Loriane Lamour (FRA)
10 July 2025; 12:00	1× (yellow card) 6× (suspension)	Report	1× (yellow card) 4× (suspension) 1× (red card)	Bemax Arena, Podgorica; Attendance: 80; Referees: Mathilde Cournil, Loriane Lamour (FRA)

10 July 2025; 17:00	Denmark	28–26	Montenegro	Bemax Arena, Podgorica; Attendance: 320; Referees: Georgiana Murariu, Mihaela Paraschiv (ROU)
10 July 2025; 17:00	Nørskov 7	(13–12)	Lekic 7	Bemax Arena, Podgorica; Attendance: 320; Referees: Georgiana Murariu, Mihaela Paraschiv (ROU)
10 July 2025; 17:00	1× (yellow card) 5× (suspension)	Report	1× (yellow card) 4× (suspension) 1× (red card)	Bemax Arena, Podgorica; Attendance: 320; Referees: Georgiana Murariu, Mihaela Paraschiv (ROU)

12 July 2025; 12:00	Lithuania	26–40	Denmark	Morača Arena, Podgorica; Attendance: 55; Referees: Ognjen Danilovic, Sebastijan Karan (BIH)
12 July 2025; 12:00	Pilikauskaite 10	(11–19)	three players 5	Morača Arena, Podgorica; Attendance: 55; Referees: Ognjen Danilovic, Sebastijan Karan (BIH)
12 July 2025; 12:00	1× (suspension)	Report	4× (suspension)	Morača Arena, Podgorica; Attendance: 55; Referees: Ognjen Danilovic, Sebastijan Karan (BIH)

12 July 2025; 17:00	Montenegro	36–31	Iceland	Morača Arena, Podgorica; Attendance: 250; Referees: Raúl Oyarzun, Aritz Zaragueta (ESP)
12 July 2025; 17:00	Mitrovic 10	(19–16)	Eiríksdóttir 7	Morača Arena, Podgorica; Attendance: 250; Referees: Raúl Oyarzun, Aritz Zaragueta (ESP)
12 July 2025; 17:00	4× (suspension)	Report	3× (suspension)	Morača Arena, Podgorica; Attendance: 250; Referees: Raúl Oyarzun, Aritz Zaragueta (ESP)

=== Group C ===
Pos	Team	Pld	W	D	L	GF	GA	GD	Pts	Qualification
1	Serbia	3	3	0	0	87	75	+12	6	Main round
2	Sweden	3	2	0	1	102	70	+32	4	Main round
3	Switzerland	3	1	0	2	71	78	−7	2	Intermediate round
4	Finland	3	0	0	3	60	97	−37	0	Intermediate round

Source: EHF
Rules for classification: 1) points; 2) head-to-head points; 3) head-to-head goal difference; 4) head-to-head number of goals scored; 5) Goal difference.

9 July 2025; 14:30	Sweden	42–16	Finland	Morača Arena, Podgorica; Attendance: 77; Referees: Loriane Lamour, Mathilde Cournil (FRA)
9 July 2025; 14:30	five players 5	(20–5)	six players 2	Morača Arena, Podgorica; Attendance: 77; Referees: Loriane Lamour, Mathilde Cournil (FRA)
9 July 2025; 14:30	1× (yellow card) 4× (suspension)	Report	1× (suspension)	Morača Arena, Podgorica; Attendance: 77; Referees: Loriane Lamour, Mathilde Cournil (FRA)

9 July 2025; 19:30	Serbia	27–22	Switzerland	Morača Arena, Podgorica; Attendance: 100; Referees: Jakub Uhlir, Vojtech Benus (CZE)
9 July 2025; 19:30	Otasevic 8	(12–9)	Baumann 5	Morača Arena, Podgorica; Attendance: 100; Referees: Jakub Uhlir, Vojtech Benus (CZE)
9 July 2025; 19:30	4× (suspension)	Report	3× (suspension)	Morača Arena, Podgorica; Attendance: 100; Referees: Jakub Uhlir, Vojtech Benus (CZE)

10 July 2025; 14:30	Switzerland	29–20	Finland	Morača Arena, Podgorica; Attendance: 90; Referees: Zsofia Marton, Rita Dane (HUN)
10 July 2025; 14:30	Erni 7	(12–11)	von Knorring 6	Morača Arena, Podgorica; Attendance: 90; Referees: Zsofia Marton, Rita Dane (HUN)
10 July 2025; 14:30	3× (suspension)	Report	5× (suspension)	Morača Arena, Podgorica; Attendance: 90; Referees: Zsofia Marton, Rita Dane (HUN)

10 July 2025; 19:30	Serbia	34–29	Sweden	Morača Arena, Podgorica; Attendance: 130; Referees: Boris Cipov, Zoran Klus (SVK)
10 July 2025; 19:30	Nedeljkovic 10	(17–16)	Norrgård, Lundvall 5	Morača Arena, Podgorica; Attendance: 130; Referees: Boris Cipov, Zoran Klus (SVK)
10 July 2025; 19:30	2× (suspension)	Report	3× (suspension)	Morača Arena, Podgorica; Attendance: 130; Referees: Boris Cipov, Zoran Klus (SVK)

12 July 2025; 12:00	Finland	24–26	Serbia	Verde Complex, Podgorica; Attendance: 110; Referees: Bruna Correa, Renata Correa (BRA)
12 July 2025; 12:00	Saukkonen, von Knorring 4	(14–15)	Nedeljkovic 5	Verde Complex, Podgorica; Attendance: 110; Referees: Bruna Correa, Renata Correa (BRA)
12 July 2025; 12:00	1× (suspension)	Report	2× (suspension)	Verde Complex, Podgorica; Attendance: 110; Referees: Bruna Correa, Renata Correa (BRA)

12 July 2025; 17:00	Sweden	31–20	Switzerland	Verde Complex, Podgorica; Attendance: 103; Referees: Bogdan Kaludjerovic, Ivan Vujacic (MNE)
12 July 2025; 17:00	Kallio 7	(15–10)	three players 4	Verde Complex, Podgorica; Attendance: 103; Referees: Bogdan Kaludjerovic, Ivan Vujacic (MNE)
12 July 2025; 17:00	1× (yellow card) 5× (suspension)	Report	2× (yellow card) 4× (suspension)	Verde Complex, Podgorica; Attendance: 103; Referees: Bogdan Kaludjerovic, Ivan Vujacic (MNE)

=== Group D ===
Pos	Team	Pld	W	D	L	GF	GA	GD	Pts	Qualification
1	Germany	3	2	1	0	97	82	+15	5	Main round
2	Spain	3	2	1	0	81	72	+9	5	Main round
3	Romania	3	1	0	2	89	89	0	2	Intermediate round
4	Faroe Islands	3	0	0	3	63	87	−24	0	Intermediate round

Source: EHF
Rules for classification: 1) points; 2) head-to-head points; 3) head-to-head goal difference; 4) head-to-head number of goals scored; 5) Goal difference.

9 July 2025; 12:00	Romania	31–25	Faroe Islands	Morača Arena, Podgorica; Attendance: 80; Referees: Barbora Bocakova, Lucia Janosikova (SVK)
9 July 2025; 12:00	Bodijar 6	(14–13)	Geirsdóttir Eystberg 7	Morača Arena, Podgorica; Attendance: 80; Referees: Barbora Bocakova, Lucia Janosikova (SVK)
9 July 2025; 12:00	5× (suspension)	Report	3× (suspension)	Morača Arena, Podgorica; Attendance: 80; Referees: Barbora Bocakova, Lucia Janosikova (SVK)

9 July 2025; 17:00	Germany	29–29	Spain	Morača Arena, Podgorica; Attendance: 100; Referees: Boris Cipov, Zoran Klus (SVK)
9 July 2025; 17:00	Rohr, Däuble 6	(16–13)	Rodríguez Lario 7	Morača Arena, Podgorica; Attendance: 100; Referees: Boris Cipov, Zoran Klus (SVK)
9 July 2025; 17:00	4× (suspension)	Report	6× (suspension) 2× (red card)	Morača Arena, Podgorica; Attendance: 100; Referees: Boris Cipov, Zoran Klus (SVK)

10 July 2025; 12:00	Spain	23–16	Faroe Islands	Morača Arena, Podgorica; Attendance: 67; Referees: Ognjen Danilovic, Sebastijan Karan (BIH)
10 July 2025; 12:00	Palanques Martorell 4	(8–6)	Reginsdóttir 4	Morača Arena, Podgorica; Attendance: 67; Referees: Ognjen Danilovic, Sebastijan Karan (BIH)
10 July 2025; 12:00	5× (suspension)	Report	1× (yellow card) 6× (suspension)	Morača Arena, Podgorica; Attendance: 67; Referees: Ognjen Danilovic, Sebastijan Karan (BIH)

10 July 2025; 17:00	Germany	35–31	Romania	Morača Arena, Podgorica; Attendance: 123; Referees: Ron Peretz, Niv Schwartz (ISR)
10 July 2025; 17:00	Rohr 9	(14–16)	Serban 7	Morača Arena, Podgorica; Attendance: 123; Referees: Ron Peretz, Niv Schwartz (ISR)
10 July 2025; 17:00	4× (suspension)	Report	2× (yellow card) 4× (suspension)	Morača Arena, Podgorica; Attendance: 123; Referees: Ron Peretz, Niv Schwartz (ISR)

12 July 2025; 14:30	Faroe Islands	22–33	Germany	Verde Complex, Podgorica; Attendance: 100; Referees: Zsofia Marton, Rita Dane (HUN)
12 July 2025; 14:30	Johannesen 8	(8–12)	Rohr 5	Verde Complex, Podgorica; Attendance: 100; Referees: Zsofia Marton, Rita Dane (HUN)
12 July 2025; 14:30	3× (suspension) 1× (red card)	Report	3× (suspension)	Verde Complex, Podgorica; Attendance: 100; Referees: Zsofia Marton, Rita Dane (HUN)

12 July 2025; 19:30	Romania	27–29	Spain	Verde Complex, Podgorica; Attendance: 150; Referees: Jakub Uhlir, Vojtech Benus (CZE)
12 July 2025; 19:30	Damian 9	(12–17)	Rodríguez Lario 9	Verde Complex, Podgorica; Attendance: 150; Referees: Jakub Uhlir, Vojtech Benus (CZE)
12 July 2025; 19:30	1× (yellow card) 6× (suspension) 2× (red card)	Report	1× (yellow card) 4× (suspension) 1× (red card)	Verde Complex, Podgorica; Attendance: 150; Referees: Jakub Uhlir, Vojtech Benus (CZE)

=== Group E ===
Pos	Team	Pld	W	D	L	GF	GA	GD	Pts	Qualification
1	France	3	3	0	0	91	64	+27	6	Main round
2	Norway	3	2	0	1	76	72	+4	4	Main round
3	Slovenia	3	1	0	2	69	88	−19	2	Intermediate round
4	Portugal	3	0	0	3	67	79	−12	0	Intermediate round

Source: EHF
Rules for classification: 1) points; 2) head-to-head points; 3) head-to-head goal difference; 4) head-to-head number of goals scored; 5) Goal difference.

9 July 2025; 14:30	Norway	29–24	Slovenia	Verde Complex, Podgorica; Attendance: 100; Referees: Zsofia Marton, Rita Dane (HUN)
9 July 2025; 14:30	Fresvik 7	(13–13)	Rakovec 9	Verde Complex, Podgorica; Attendance: 100; Referees: Zsofia Marton, Rita Dane (HUN)
9 July 2025; 14:30	3× (suspension)	Report	3× (suspension)	Verde Complex, Podgorica; Attendance: 100; Referees: Zsofia Marton, Rita Dane (HUN)

9 July 2025; 19:30	France	30–21	Portugal	Verde Complex, Podgorica; Attendance: 90; Referees: Bogdan Kaludjerovic, Ivan Vujacic (MNE)
9 July 2025; 19:30	Amelot 6	(18–10)	De Paiva, Santos Noronha 6	Verde Complex, Podgorica; Attendance: 90; Referees: Bogdan Kaludjerovic, Ivan Vujacic (MNE)
9 July 2025; 19:30		Report	5× (suspension)	Verde Complex, Podgorica; Attendance: 90; Referees: Bogdan Kaludjerovic, Ivan Vujacic (MNE)

10 July 2025; 14:30	Portugal	23–25	Slovenia	Verde Complex, Podgorica; Attendance: 90; Referees: Lucas Hellbusch, Darnel Jansen (GER)
10 July 2025; 14:30	De Paiva Da Silva 9	(9–11)	Grandic 7	Verde Complex, Podgorica; Attendance: 90; Referees: Lucas Hellbusch, Darnel Jansen (GER)
10 July 2025; 14:30	7× (suspension)	Report	4× (suspension) 1× (red card)	Verde Complex, Podgorica; Attendance: 90; Referees: Lucas Hellbusch, Darnel Jansen (GER)

10 July 2025; 19:30	France	25–23	Norway	Verde Complex, Podgorica; Attendance: 80; Referees: Jakub Uhlir, Vojtech Benus (CZE)
10 July 2025; 19:30	three players 4	(15–10)	Fresvik 7	Verde Complex, Podgorica; Attendance: 80; Referees: Jakub Uhlir, Vojtech Benus (CZE)
10 July 2025; 19:30	1× (yellow card) 4× (suspension)	Report	2× (suspension)	Verde Complex, Podgorica; Attendance: 80; Referees: Jakub Uhlir, Vojtech Benus (CZE)

12 July 2025; 12:00	Slovenia	20–36	France	Bemax Arena, Podgorica; Attendance: 90; Referees: Mattias Fält, Mikael Holm (SWE)
12 July 2025; 12:00	Rakovec 5	(10–18)	five players 4	Bemax Arena, Podgorica; Attendance: 90; Referees: Mattias Fält, Mikael Holm (SWE)
12 July 2025; 12:00	1× (suspension)	Report	2× (suspension)	Bemax Arena, Podgorica; Attendance: 90; Referees: Mattias Fält, Mikael Holm (SWE)

12 July 2025; 17:00	Norway	24–23	Portugal	Bemax Arena, Podgorica; Attendance: 100; Referees: Boris Cipov, Zoran Klus (SVK)
12 July 2025; 17:00	Ekerhovd 5	(13–11)	Santos Noronha 8	Bemax Arena, Podgorica; Attendance: 100; Referees: Boris Cipov, Zoran Klus (SVK)
12 July 2025; 17:00	1× (yellow card) 3× (suspension)	Report	1× (yellow card) 3× (suspension)	Bemax Arena, Podgorica; Attendance: 100; Referees: Boris Cipov, Zoran Klus (SVK)

=== Group F ===
Pos	Team	Pld	W	D	L	GF	GA	GD	Pts	Qualification
1	Croatia	3	3	0	0	82	63	+19	6	Main round
2	Austria	3	2	0	1	83	77	+6	4	Main round
3	Turkey	3	1	0	2	74	89	−15	2	Intermediate round
4	Netherlands	3	0	0	3	70	80	−10	0	Intermediate round

Source: EHF
Rules for classification: 1) points; 2) head-to-head points; 3) head-to-head goal difference; 4) head-to-head number of goals scored; 5) Goal difference.

9 July 2025; 12:00	Netherlands	25–29	Turkey	Verde Complex, Podgorica; Attendance: 50; Referees: Georgiana Murariu, Mihaela Paraschiv (ROU)
9 July 2025; 12:00	Horvers 7	(13–12)	Seven 15	Verde Complex, Podgorica; Attendance: 50; Referees: Georgiana Murariu, Mihaela Paraschiv (ROU)
9 July 2025; 12:00	1× (yellow card) 2× (suspension)	Report	4× (suspension)	Verde Complex, Podgorica; Attendance: 50; Referees: Georgiana Murariu, Mihaela Paraschiv (ROU)

9 July 2025; 17:00	Croatia	29–21	Austria	Verde Complex, Podgorica; Attendance: 80; Referees: Bruna Correa, Renata Correa (BRA)
9 July 2025; 17:00	Renic, Zubac 6	(14–8)	Baljak 6	Verde Complex, Podgorica; Attendance: 80; Referees: Bruna Correa, Renata Correa (BRA)
9 July 2025; 17:00	3× (suspension)	Report	2× (suspension)	Verde Complex, Podgorica; Attendance: 80; Referees: Bruna Correa, Renata Correa (BRA)

10 July 2025; 12:00	Austria	34–24	Turkey	Verde Complex, Podgorica; Attendance: 100; Referees: Dragana Jakovljevic, Danijela Sando Kovacevic (SRB)
10 July 2025; 12:00	Barnjak 10	(16–12)	Seven 8	Verde Complex, Podgorica; Attendance: 100; Referees: Dragana Jakovljevic, Danijela Sando Kovacevic (SRB)
10 July 2025; 12:00	1× (yellow card) 2× (suspension)	Report	5× (suspension)	Verde Complex, Podgorica; Attendance: 100; Referees: Dragana Jakovljevic, Danijela Sando Kovacevic (SRB)

10 July 2025; 17:00	Croatia	23–21	Netherlands	Verde Complex, Podgorica; Attendance: 125; Referees: Raúl Oyarzun, Aritz Zaragueta (ESP)
10 July 2025; 17:00	Vukovic 8	(12–11)	Horvers 9	Verde Complex, Podgorica; Attendance: 125; Referees: Raúl Oyarzun, Aritz Zaragueta (ESP)
10 July 2025; 17:00	3× (suspension)	Report	4× (suspension)	Verde Complex, Podgorica; Attendance: 125; Referees: Raúl Oyarzun, Aritz Zaragueta (ESP)

12 July 2025; 14:30	Turkey	21–30	Croatia	Bemax Arena, Podgorica; Attendance: 80; Referees: Barbora Bocakova, Lucia Janosikova (SVK)
12 July 2025; 14:30	Karagözlü 7	(10–16)	Renic 7	Bemax Arena, Podgorica; Attendance: 80; Referees: Barbora Bocakova, Lucia Janosikova (SVK)
12 July 2025; 14:30	2× (suspension) 1× (red card)	Report	3× (suspension)	Bemax Arena, Podgorica; Attendance: 80; Referees: Barbora Bocakova, Lucia Janosikova (SVK)

12 July 2025; 19:30	Netherlands	24–28	Austria	Bemax Arena, Podgorica; Attendance: 80; Referees: Ron Peretz, Niv Schwartz (ISR)
12 July 2025; 19:30	Portengen 4	(9–14)	three players 5	Bemax Arena, Podgorica; Attendance: 80; Referees: Ron Peretz, Niv Schwartz (ISR)
12 July 2025; 19:30	1× (yellow card) 8× (suspension)	Report	4× (suspension)	Bemax Arena, Podgorica; Attendance: 80; Referees: Ron Peretz, Niv Schwartz (ISR)

== Main round ==
Points and goals gained in the preliminary group against teams that advanced were transferred to the main round.

=== Group G ===
Pos	Team	Pld	W	D	L	GF	GA	GD	Pts	Qualification
1	Denmark	3	3	0	0	79	69	+10	6	Quarterfinals
2	Montenegro	3	1	0	2	84	81	+3	2	Quarterfinals
3	Hungary	3	1	0	2	71	75	−4	2	Quarterfinals
4	Czech Republic	3	1	0	2	77	86	−9	2	9th–16th place playoffs

Source: EHF
Rules for classification: 1) points; 2) head-to-head points; 3) head-to-head goal difference; 4) head-to-head number of goals scored; 5) Goal difference.

14 July 2025; 17:00	Czech Republic	20–26	Denmark	Verde Complex, Podgorica; Attendance: 85; Referees: Boris Cipov, Zoran Klus (SVK)
14 July 2025; 17:00	Knedlová 5	(10–15)	Nørskov 7	Verde Complex, Podgorica; Attendance: 85; Referees: Boris Cipov, Zoran Klus (SVK)
14 July 2025; 17:00	1× (yellow card) 3× (suspension)	Report	1× (yellow card) 5× (suspension)	Verde Complex, Podgorica; Attendance: 85; Referees: Boris Cipov, Zoran Klus (SVK)

14 July 2025; 19:30	Hungary	24–22	Montenegro	Verde Complex, Podgorica; Attendance: 220; Referees: Bruna Correa, Renata Correa (BRA)
14 July 2025; 19:30	Fazekas 6	(12–13)	Mitrovic 8	Verde Complex, Podgorica; Attendance: 220; Referees: Bruna Correa, Renata Correa (BRA)
14 July 2025; 19:30	2× (yellow card) 7× (suspension)	Report	1× (yellow card) 4× (suspension)	Verde Complex, Podgorica; Attendance: 220; Referees: Bruna Correa, Renata Correa (BRA)

15 July 2025; 17:00	Montenegro	36–29	Czech Republic	Verde Complex, Podgorica; Attendance: 80; Referees: Ron Peretz, Niv Schwartz (ISR)
15 July 2025; 17:00	Ceklic 8	(21–14)	Pazderová 7	Verde Complex, Podgorica; Attendance: 80; Referees: Ron Peretz, Niv Schwartz (ISR)
15 July 2025; 17:00	1× (yellow card) 7× (suspension) 1× (red card)	Report	8× (suspension) 2× (red card)	Verde Complex, Podgorica; Attendance: 80; Referees: Ron Peretz, Niv Schwartz (ISR)

15 July 2025; 19:30	Denmark	25–23	Hungary	Verde Complex, Podgorica; Attendance: 250; Referees: Ognjen Danilovic, Sebastijan Karan (BIH)
15 July 2025; 19:30	Hansen, Plougstrup 4	(11–12)	Kacsó 7	Verde Complex, Podgorica; Attendance: 250; Referees: Ognjen Danilovic, Sebastijan Karan (BIH)
15 July 2025; 19:30	4× (suspension)	Report	4× (suspension)	Verde Complex, Podgorica; Attendance: 250; Referees: Ognjen Danilovic, Sebastijan Karan (BIH)

=== Group H ===
Pos	Team	Pld	W	D	L	GF	GA	GD	Pts	Qualification
1	Germany	3	2	1	0	104	79	+25	5	Quarterfinals
2	Spain	3	1	1	1	82	82	0	3	Quarterfinals
3	Serbia	3	1	0	2	84	96	−12	2	9th–16th place playoffs
4	Sweden	3	1	0	2	82	95	−13	2	9th–16th place playoffs

Source: EHF
Rules for classification: 1) points; 2) head-to-head points; 3) head-to-head goal difference; 4) head-to-head number of goals scored; 5) Goal difference.

14 July 2025; 17:00	Serbia	24–40	Germany	Bemax Arena, Podgorica; Attendance: 150; Referees: Mathilde Cournil, Loriane Lamour (FRA)
14 July 2025; 17:00	Radović 4	(16–18)	Rohr 9	Bemax Arena, Podgorica; Attendance: 150; Referees: Mathilde Cournil, Loriane Lamour (FRA)
14 July 2025; 17:00	1× (suspension)	Report	4× (suspension)	Bemax Arena, Podgorica; Attendance: 150; Referees: Mathilde Cournil, Loriane Lamour (FRA)

14 July 2025; 19:30	Sweden	27–26	Spain	Bemax Arena, Podgorica; Attendance: 300; Referees: Zsofia Marton, Rita Dane (HUN)
14 July 2025; 19:30	Börjesson 5	(17–13)	Rodríguez Sarasola	Bemax Arena, Podgorica; Attendance: 300; Referees: Zsofia Marton, Rita Dane (HUN)
14 July 2025; 19:30	1× (yellow card) 6× (suspension)	Report	3× (suspension)	Bemax Arena, Podgorica; Attendance: 300; Referees: Zsofia Marton, Rita Dane (HUN)

15 July 2025; 17:00	Spain	27–26	Serbia	Bemax Arena, Podgorica; Attendance: 100; Referees: Boris Cipov, Zoran Klus (SVK)
15 July 2025; 17:00	Rodríguez Lario 10	(17–15)	Nedeljkovic 6	Bemax Arena, Podgorica; Attendance: 100; Referees: Boris Cipov, Zoran Klus (SVK)
15 July 2025; 17:00	2× (suspension)	Report	1× (yellow card) 4× (suspension)	Bemax Arena, Podgorica; Attendance: 100; Referees: Boris Cipov, Zoran Klus (SVK)

15 July 2025; 19:30	Germany	35–26	Sweden	Bemax Arena, Podgorica; Attendance: 206; Referees: Georgiana Murariu, Mihaela Paraschiv (ROU)
15 July 2025; 19:30	Klocke 6	(15–15)	three players 4	Bemax Arena, Podgorica; Attendance: 206; Referees: Georgiana Murariu, Mihaela Paraschiv (ROU)
15 July 2025; 19:30	1× (yellow card) 6× (suspension)	Report	1× (yellow card) 4× (suspension)	Bemax Arena, Podgorica; Attendance: 206; Referees: Georgiana Murariu, Mihaela Paraschiv (ROU)

=== Group I ===
Pos	Team	Pld	W	D	L	GF	GA	GD	Pts	Qualification
1	France	3	3	0	0	89	60	+29	6	Quarterfinals
2	Croatia	3	2	0	1	64	75	−11	4	Quarterfinals
3	Austria	3	1	0	2	80	87	−7	2	Quarterfinals
4	Norway	3	0	0	3	71	82	−11	0	9th–16th place playoffs

Source: EHF
Rules for classification: 1) points; 2) head-to-head points; 3) head-to-head goal difference; 4) head-to-head number of goals scored; 5) Goal difference.

14 July 2025; 17:00	France	33–13	Croatia	Morača Arena, Podgorica; Attendance: 120; Referees: Lucas Hellbusch, Darnel Jansen (GER)
14 July 2025; 17:00	Ferdilus, Naal 5	(15–5)	Vukovic 5	Morača Arena, Podgorica; Attendance: 120; Referees: Lucas Hellbusch, Darnel Jansen (GER)
14 July 2025; 17:00	1× (suspension)	Report	1× (suspension)	Morača Arena, Podgorica; Attendance: 120; Referees: Lucas Hellbusch, Darnel Jansen (GER)

14 July 2025; 19:30	Norway	27–35	Austria	Morača Arena, Podgorica; Attendance: 140; Referees: Raúl Oyarzun, Aritz Zaragueta (ESP)
14 July 2025; 19:30	Breen 7	(14–16)	Matičević 9	Morača Arena, Podgorica; Attendance: 140; Referees: Raúl Oyarzun, Aritz Zaragueta (ESP)
14 July 2025; 19:30		Report	2× (suspension)	Morača Arena, Podgorica; Attendance: 140; Referees: Raúl Oyarzun, Aritz Zaragueta (ESP)

15 July 2025; 17:00	Austria	24–31	France	Morača Arena, Podgorica; Attendance: 120; Referees: Bogdan Kaludjerovic, Ivan Vujacic (MNE)
15 July 2025; 17:00	Baljak, Barnjak 5	(11–15)	Gros 7	Morača Arena, Podgorica; Attendance: 120; Referees: Bogdan Kaludjerovic, Ivan Vujacic (MNE)
15 July 2025; 17:00	2× (suspension)	Report	1× (yellow card) 5× (suspension)	Morača Arena, Podgorica; Attendance: 120; Referees: Bogdan Kaludjerovic, Ivan Vujacic (MNE)

15 July 2025; 19:30	Croatia	22–21	Norway	Morača Arena, Podgorica; Attendance: 140; Referees: Jakub Uhlir, Vojtech Benus (CZE)
15 July 2025; 19:30	Zubac 7	(13–13)	Fresvik, Holte 6	Morača Arena, Podgorica; Attendance: 140; Referees: Jakub Uhlir, Vojtech Benus (CZE)
15 July 2025; 19:30	1× (yellow card) 3× (suspension)	Report	1× (yellow card) 2× (suspension)	Morača Arena, Podgorica; Attendance: 140; Referees: Jakub Uhlir, Vojtech Benus (CZE)

=== Ranking of third-placed teams ===
Pos	Grp	Team	Pld	W	D	L	GF	GA	GD	Pts	Qualification
1	G	Hungary	3	1	0	2	71	75	−4	2	Quarterfinals
2	I	Austria	3	1	0	2	80	87	−7	2	Quarterfinals
3	H	Serbia	3	1	0	2	84	96	−12	2	9th–16th place playoffs

Source: EHF
Rules for classification: 1) points; 2) head-to-head points; 3) head-to-head goal difference; 4) head-to-head number of goals scored; 5) goal difference.

== Intermediate round ==
Points and goals gained in the preliminary group against teams that advanced were transferred to the intermediate round.

=== Group J ===
Pos	Team	Pld	W	D	L	GF	GA	GD	Pts	Qualification
1	Poland	3	3	0	0	78	57	+21	6	9th–16th place playoffs
2	Iceland	3	2	0	1	100	79	+21	4	9th–16th place playoffs
3	Lithuania	3	0	1	2	74	84	−10	1	17th–24th place playoffs
4	North Macedonia	3	0	1	2	73	105	−32	1	17th–24th place playoffs

Source: EHF
Rules for classification: 1) points; 2) head-to-head points; 3) head-to-head goal difference; 4) head-to-head number of goals scored; 5) Goal difference.

14 July 2025; 12:00	Poland	26–21	Iceland	Verde Complex, Podgorica; Attendance: 80; Referees: Ognjen Danilovic, Sebastijan Karan (BIH)
14 July 2025; 12:00	Zimnicka 9	(15–8)	Arnardóttir 5	Verde Complex, Podgorica; Attendance: 80; Referees: Ognjen Danilovic, Sebastijan Karan (BIH)
14 July 2025; 12:00	1× (yellow card) 3× (suspension)	Report		Verde Complex, Podgorica; Attendance: 80; Referees: Ognjen Danilovic, Sebastijan Karan (BIH)

14 July 2025; 14:30	North Macedonia	29–29	Lithuania	Verde Complex, Podgorica; Attendance: 105; Referees: Barbora Bocakova, Lucia Janosikova (SVK)
14 July 2025; 14:30	Kotevska 9	(12–17)	Pilikauskaite 11	Verde Complex, Podgorica; Attendance: 105; Referees: Barbora Bocakova, Lucia Janosikova (SVK)
14 July 2025; 14:30	1× (yellow card) 6× (suspension)	Report	1× (yellow card) 3× (suspension)	Verde Complex, Podgorica; Attendance: 105; Referees: Barbora Bocakova, Lucia Janosikova (SVK)

15 July 2025; 12:00	Lithuania	18–24	Poland	Verde Complex, Podgorica; Attendance: 30; Referees: Bruna Correa, Renata Correa (BRA)
15 July 2025; 12:00	Pilikauskaite 7	(10–9)	Machnio, Zimnicka 4	Verde Complex, Podgorica; Attendance: 30; Referees: Bruna Correa, Renata Correa (BRA)
15 July 2025; 12:00	4× (suspension)	Report	5× (suspension)	Verde Complex, Podgorica; Attendance: 30; Referees: Bruna Correa, Renata Correa (BRA)

15 July 2025; 14:30	Iceland	48–26	North Macedonia	Verde Complex, Podgorica; Attendance: 60; Referees: Raúl Oyarzun, Aritz Zaragueta (ESP)
15 July 2025; 14:30	Þórhallsdóttir 18	(21–7)	Todorovska 6	Verde Complex, Podgorica; Attendance: 60; Referees: Raúl Oyarzun, Aritz Zaragueta (ESP)
15 July 2025; 14:30	1× (yellow card) 5× (suspension) 1× (red card)	Report	3× (suspension) 2× (red card)	Verde Complex, Podgorica; Attendance: 60; Referees: Raúl Oyarzun, Aritz Zaragueta (ESP)

=== Group K ===
Pos	Team	Pld	W	D	L	GF	GA	GD	Pts	Qualification
1	Romania	3	3	0	0	115	80	+35	6	9th–16th place playoffs
2	Switzerland	3	2	0	1	89	75	+14	4	17th–24th place playoffs
3	Faroe Islands	3	1	0	2	71	86	−15	2	17th–24th place playoffs
4	Finland	3	0	0	3	70	104	−34	0	17th–24th place playoffs

Source: EHF
Rules for classification: 1) points; 2) head-to-head points; 3) head-to-head goal difference; 4) head-to-head number of goals scored; 5) Goal difference.

14 July 2025; 12:00	Switzerland	30–41	Romania	Bemax Arena, Podgorica; Attendance: 77; Referees: Dragana Jakovljevic, Danijela Sando Kovacevic (SRB)
14 July 2025; 12:00	Erni 11	(14–21)	Damian 13	Bemax Arena, Podgorica; Attendance: 77; Referees: Dragana Jakovljevic, Danijela Sando Kovacevic (SRB)
14 July 2025; 12:00	1× (yellow card) 4× (suspension) 1× (red card)	Report	3× (suspension)	Bemax Arena, Podgorica; Attendance: 77; Referees: Dragana Jakovljevic, Danijela Sando Kovacevic (SRB)

14 July 2025; 14:30	Finland	25–32	Faroe Islands	Bemax Arena, Podgorica; Attendance: 90; Referees: Mattias Fält, Mikael Holm (SWE)
14 July 2025; 14:30	von Knorring 5	(12–15)	Geirsdóttir Eystberg 13	Bemax Arena, Podgorica; Attendance: 90; Referees: Mattias Fält, Mikael Holm (SWE)
14 July 2025; 14:30	5× (suspension)	Report	6× (suspension)	Bemax Arena, Podgorica; Attendance: 90; Referees: Mattias Fält, Mikael Holm (SWE)

15 July 2025; 12:00	Faroe Islands	14–30	Switzerland	Bemax Arena, Podgorica; Attendance: 150; Referees: Mathilde Cournil, Loriane Lamour (FRA)
15 July 2025; 12:00	Geirsdóttir Eystberg 3	(6–16)	Erni 6	Bemax Arena, Podgorica; Attendance: 150; Referees: Mathilde Cournil, Loriane Lamour (FRA)
15 July 2025; 12:00	8× (suspension)	Report	1× (suspension)	Bemax Arena, Podgorica; Attendance: 150; Referees: Mathilde Cournil, Loriane Lamour (FRA)

15 July 2025; 14:30	Romania	43–25	Finland	Bemax Arena, Podgorica; Attendance: 120; Referees: Zsofia Marton, Rita Dane (HUN)
15 July 2025; 14:30	Mihaila 10	(27–14)	Saukkonen 5	Bemax Arena, Podgorica; Attendance: 120; Referees: Zsofia Marton, Rita Dane (HUN)
15 July 2025; 14:30	4× (suspension)	Report	2× (suspension)	Bemax Arena, Podgorica; Attendance: 120; Referees: Zsofia Marton, Rita Dane (HUN)

=== Group L ===
Pos	Team	Pld	W	D	L	GF	GA	GD	Pts	Qualification
1	Turkey	3	2	0	1	85	88	−3	4	9th–16th place playoffs
2	Netherlands	3	2	0	1	88	72	+16	4	17th–24th place playoffs
3	Slovenia	3	1	0	2	74	81	−7	2	17th–24th place playoffs
4	Portugal	3	1	0	2	80	86	−6	2	17th–24th place playoffs

Source: EHF
Rules for classification: 1) points; 2) head-to-head points; 3) head-to-head goal difference; 4) head-to-head number of goals scored; 5) Goal difference.

14 July 2025; 12:00	Slovenia	25–26	Turkey	Morača Arena, Podgorica; Attendance: 50; Referees: Ron Peretz, Niv Schwartz (ISR)
14 July 2025; 12:00	Pogorelc 7	(12–13)	Sönmez 9	Morača Arena, Podgorica; Attendance: 50; Referees: Ron Peretz, Niv Schwartz (ISR)
14 July 2025; 12:00	5× (suspension)	Report	6× (suspension) 1× (red card)	Morača Arena, Podgorica; Attendance: 50; Referees: Ron Peretz, Niv Schwartz (ISR)

14 July 2025; 14:30	Portugal	19–31	Netherlands	Morača Arena, Podgorica; Attendance: 100; Referees: Georgiana Murariu, Mihaela Paraschiv (ROU)
14 July 2025; 14:30	Santos Noronha 4	(9–14)	Horvers 11	Morača Arena, Podgorica; Attendance: 100; Referees: Georgiana Murariu, Mihaela Paraschiv (ROU)
14 July 2025; 14:30	4× (suspension)	Report	1× (yellow card) 5× (suspension)	Morača Arena, Podgorica; Attendance: 100; Referees: Georgiana Murariu, Mihaela Paraschiv (ROU)

15 July 2025; 12:00	Netherlands	32–24	Slovenia	Morača Arena, Podgorica; Attendance: 100; Referees: Lucas Hellbusch, Darnel Jansen (GER)
15 July 2025; 12:00	Horvers 10	(14–7)	Ermenc 7	Morača Arena, Podgorica; Attendance: 100; Referees: Lucas Hellbusch, Darnel Jansen (GER)
15 July 2025; 12:00	1× (yellow card) 6× (suspension)	Report	5× (suspension)	Morača Arena, Podgorica; Attendance: 100; Referees: Lucas Hellbusch, Darnel Jansen (GER)

15 July 2025; 14:30	Turkey	30–38	Portugal	Morača Arena, Podgorica; Attendance: 80; Referees: Barbora Bocakova, Lucia Janosikova (SVK)
15 July 2025; 14:30	Bozova 7	(16–20)	Rocha Ribeiro 11	Morača Arena, Podgorica; Attendance: 80; Referees: Barbora Bocakova, Lucia Janosikova (SVK)
15 July 2025; 14:30	3× (suspension)	Report	3× (suspension)	Morača Arena, Podgorica; Attendance: 80; Referees: Barbora Bocakova, Lucia Janosikova (SVK)

=== Ranking of second-placed teams ===
Pos	Grp	Team	Pld	W	D	L	GF	GA	GD	Pts	Qualification
1	J	Iceland	3	2	0	1	100	79	+21	4	9th–16th place playoffs
2	L	Netherlands	3	2	0	1	88	72	+16	4	17th–24th place playoffs
3	K	Switzerland	3	2	0	1	89	75	+14	4	17th–24th place playoffs

Source: EHF
Rules for classification: 1) points; 2) head-to-head points; 3) head-to-head goal difference; 4) head-to-head number of goals scored; 5) goal difference.

== 17th–24th place playoffs ==
21st place match
Finland	27
Portugal	32
23rd place match
Lithuania	38
North Macedonia	39

21st–24th place semifinals
Finland	34
Lithuania	26
North Macedonia	28
Portugal	29

17th–24th place quarterfinals
1	Netherlands	30
8	Finland	27
4	Faroe Islands	39
5	Lithuania	38
2	Switzerland	33
7	North Macedonia	23
3	Slovenia	35
6	Portugal	29

17th–20th place semifinals
Netherlands	28
Faroe Islands	23
Switzerland	27
Slovenia	23

17th place match
Netherlands	25
Switzerland	23
19th place match
Faroe Islands	23
Slovenia	31

=== 17th–24th place quarterfinals ===
17 July 2025; 12:00	Netherlands	30–17	Finland	Verde Complex, Podgorica; Attendance: 80; Referees: Barbora Bocakova, Lucia Janosikova (SVK)
17 July 2025; 12:00	Horvers 11	(13–11)	Saukkonen 10	Verde Complex, Podgorica; Attendance: 80; Referees: Barbora Bocakova, Lucia Janosikova (SVK)
17 July 2025; 12:00	2× (yellow card) 6× (suspension)	Report	2× (suspension)	Verde Complex, Podgorica; Attendance: 80; Referees: Barbora Bocakova, Lucia Janosikova (SVK)

17 July 2025
14:30
Faroe Islands
39–38
Lithuania
Verde Complex, Podgorica
Attendance: 25
Referees: Dragana Jakovljevic, Danijela Sando Kovacevic (SRB)
Borgarlíð Joensen 13
(14–21)
Pilikauskaite 13
2× (suspension)
Report
3× (suspension)

FT: 32–32 Pen: 7–6

17 July 2025; 17:00	Switzerland	33–23	North Macedonia	Verde Complex, Podgorica; Attendance: 56; Referees: Georgiana Murariu, Mihaela Paraschiv (ROU)
17 July 2025; 17:00	Baumann, Brunett 8	(17–10)	Lashkoska 6	Verde Complex, Podgorica; Attendance: 56; Referees: Georgiana Murariu, Mihaela Paraschiv (ROU)
17 July 2025; 17:00	1× (suspension)	Report	1× (yellow card) 7× (suspension)	Verde Complex, Podgorica; Attendance: 56; Referees: Georgiana Murariu, Mihaela Paraschiv (ROU)

17 July 2025; 19:30	Slovenia	35–29	Portugal	Verde Complex, Podgorica; Attendance: 70; Referees: Ognjen Danilovic, Sebastijan Karan (BIH)
17 July 2025; 19:30	Doneva 7	(16–12)	Santos Noronha, Silva Calçada 7	Verde Complex, Podgorica; Attendance: 70; Referees: Ognjen Danilovic, Sebastijan Karan (BIH)
17 July 2025; 19:30	4× (suspension)	Report	3× (suspension)	Verde Complex, Podgorica; Attendance: 70; Referees: Ognjen Danilovic, Sebastijan Karan (BIH)

=== 21st–24th place semifinals ===
18 July 2025; 12:00	Finland	34–26	Lithuania	Verde Complex, Podgorica; Attendance: 50; Referees: Bogdan Kaludjerovic, Ivan Vujacic (MNE)
18 July 2025; 12:00	Björkenheim-Ajo 9	(17–12)	Pilikauskaite 7	Verde Complex, Podgorica; Attendance: 50; Referees: Bogdan Kaludjerovic, Ivan Vujacic (MNE)
18 July 2025; 12:00	1× (yellow card) 5× (suspension)	Report	1× (yellow card) 4× (suspension)	Verde Complex, Podgorica; Attendance: 50; Referees: Bogdan Kaludjerovic, Ivan Vujacic (MNE)

18 July 2025; 17:00	North Macedonia	28–29	Portugal	Verde Complex, Podgorica; Attendance: 51; Referees: Mattias Fält, Mikael Holm (SWE)
18 July 2025; 17:00	Milenkoska 6	(13–11)	De Paiva Da Silva 9	Verde Complex, Podgorica; Attendance: 51; Referees: Mattias Fält, Mikael Holm (SWE)
18 July 2025; 17:00	3× (suspension)	Report	3× (suspension)	Verde Complex, Podgorica; Attendance: 51; Referees: Mattias Fält, Mikael Holm (SWE)

=== 23rd place match ===
20 July 2025; 09:30	Lithuania	38–39	North Macedonia	Verde Complex, Podgorica; Attendance: 15; Referees: Jakub Uhlir, Vojtech Benus (CZE)
20 July 2025; 09:30	Pilikauskaite-Ajo 13	(19–20)	Kotevska, Milenkoska 9	Verde Complex, Podgorica; Attendance: 15; Referees: Jakub Uhlir, Vojtech Benus (CZE)
20 July 2025; 09:30	4× (suspension)	Report	6× (suspension) 1× (red card)	Verde Complex, Podgorica; Attendance: 15; Referees: Jakub Uhlir, Vojtech Benus (CZE)

=== 21st place match ===
20 July 2025; 09:30	Finland	27–32	Portugal	Morača Arena, Podgorica; Attendance: 50; Referees: Ognjen Danilovic, Sebastijan Karan (BIH)
20 July 2025; 09:30	Juvala, Rinta-Paavola 4	(13–18)	Rocha Ribeiro 8	Morača Arena, Podgorica; Attendance: 50; Referees: Ognjen Danilovic, Sebastijan Karan (BIH)
20 July 2025; 09:30		Report	1× (suspension)	Morača Arena, Podgorica; Attendance: 50; Referees: Ognjen Danilovic, Sebastijan Karan (BIH)

=== 17th–20th place semifinals ===
18 July 2025; 14:30	Netherlands	28–23	Faroe Islands	Verde Complex, Podgorica; Attendance: 90; Referees: Lucas Hellbusch, Darnel Jansen (GER)
18 July 2025; 14:30	Horvers 7	(13–11)	Geirsdóttir Eystberg, Johannesen 7	Verde Complex, Podgorica; Attendance: 90; Referees: Lucas Hellbusch, Darnel Jansen (GER)
18 July 2025; 14:30	2× (suspension)	Report	3× (suspension)	Verde Complex, Podgorica; Attendance: 90; Referees: Lucas Hellbusch, Darnel Jansen (GER)

18 July 2025; 19:30	Switzerland	27–23	Slovenia	Verde Complex, Podgorica; Attendance: 40; Referees: Raúl Oyarzun, Aritz Zaragueta (ESP)
18 July 2025; 19:30	Baumann, Brunett 8	(13–8)	Pogorelc 7	Verde Complex, Podgorica; Attendance: 40; Referees: Raúl Oyarzun, Aritz Zaragueta (ESP)
18 July 2025; 19:30	2× (suspension)	Report	7× (yellow card) 1× (suspension)	Verde Complex, Podgorica; Attendance: 40; Referees: Raúl Oyarzun, Aritz Zaragueta (ESP)

=== 19th place match ===
20 July 2025; 09:30	Faroe Islands	23–31	Slovenia	Bemax Arena, Podgorica; Attendance: 60; Referees: Dragana Jakovljevic, Danijella Sando Kovacevic (SRB)
20 July 2025; 09:30	Geirsdóttir Eystberg 8	(13–15)	Puncer 8	Bemax Arena, Podgorica; Attendance: 60; Referees: Dragana Jakovljevic, Danijella Sando Kovacevic (SRB)
20 July 2025; 09:30	2× (suspension)	Report	2× (suspension)	Bemax Arena, Podgorica; Attendance: 60; Referees: Dragana Jakovljevic, Danijella Sando Kovacevic (SRB)

=== 17th place match ===
20 July 2025; 12:00	Netherlands	25–23	Switzerland	Verde Complex, Podgorica; Attendance: 40; Referees: Boris Cipov, Zoran Klus (SVK)
20 July 2025; 12:00	Horvers, Schouten 8	(17–15)	Baumann 9	Verde Complex, Podgorica; Attendance: 40; Referees: Boris Cipov, Zoran Klus (SVK)
20 July 2025; 12:00	1× (yellow card) 5× (suspension)	Report	1× (suspension)	Verde Complex, Podgorica; Attendance: 40; Referees: Boris Cipov, Zoran Klus (SVK)

== 9th–16th place playoffs ==
13th place match
Norway	22
Sweden	31
15th place match
Iceland	36
Turkey	24

13th–16th place semifinals
Iceland	24
Norway	34
Turkey	18
Sweden	43

9th–16th place quarterfinals
1	Serbia	29
8	Iceland	24
4	Norway	29
5	Romania	31
2	Czech Republic	41
7	Turkey	23
3	Sweden	21
6	Poland	26

9th–12th place semifinals
Serbia	25
Romania	29
Czech Republic	26
Poland	25

9th place match
Romania	36
Czech Republic	21
11th place match
Serbia	27
Poland	31

=== 9th–16th place quarterfinals ===
17 July 2025; 12:00	Serbia	29–24	Iceland	Bemax Arena, Podgorica; Attendance: 100; Referees: Jakub Uhlir, Vojtech Benus (CZE)
17 July 2025; 12:00	Nedeljković 9	(14–11)	Þórhallsdóttir, Pálsdóttir 5	Bemax Arena, Podgorica; Attendance: 100; Referees: Jakub Uhlir, Vojtech Benus (CZE)
17 July 2025; 12:00	2× (suspension)	Report	1× (yellow card) 2× (suspension)	Bemax Arena, Podgorica; Attendance: 100; Referees: Jakub Uhlir, Vojtech Benus (CZE)

17 July 2025; 12:00	Norway	29–31	Romania	Morača Arena, Podgorica; Attendance: 100; Referees: Bruna Correa, Renata Correa (BRA)
17 July 2025; 12:00	Fresvik 8	(16–16)	Damian 7	Morača Arena, Podgorica; Attendance: 100; Referees: Bruna Correa, Renata Correa (BRA)
17 July 2025; 12:00	3× (suspension)	Report	1× (yellow card) 2× (suspension) 1× (red card)	Morača Arena, Podgorica; Attendance: 100; Referees: Bruna Correa, Renata Correa (BRA)

17 July 2025; 14:30	Czech Republic	41–23	Turkey	Bemax Arena, Podgorica; Attendance: 50; Referees: Zsofia Marton, Rita Dane (HUN)
17 July 2025; 14:30	four players 5	(17–7)	Seven 5	Bemax Arena, Podgorica; Attendance: 50; Referees: Zsofia Marton, Rita Dane (HUN)
17 July 2025; 14:30	4× (suspension)	Report	8× (suspension)	Bemax Arena, Podgorica; Attendance: 50; Referees: Zsofia Marton, Rita Dane (HUN)

17 July 2025; 14:30	Sweden	21–26	Poland	Morača Arena, Podgorica; Attendance: 60; Referees: Bogdan Kaludjerovic, Ivan Vujacic (MNE)
17 July 2025; 14:30	Lundvall, Norrgård 6	(7–14)	Chwojnicka 7	Morača Arena, Podgorica; Attendance: 60; Referees: Bogdan Kaludjerovic, Ivan Vujacic (MNE)
17 July 2025; 14:30	1× (yellow card) 7× (suspension) 1× (red card)	Report	1× (yellow card) 6× (suspension) 1× (red card)	Morača Arena, Podgorica; Attendance: 60; Referees: Bogdan Kaludjerovic, Ivan Vujacic (MNE)

=== 13th–16th place semifinals ===
18 July 2025; 12:00	Iceland	24–34	Norway	Morača Arena, Podgorica; Attendance: 75; Referees: Dragana Jakovljevic, Danijella Sando Kovacevic (SRB)
18 July 2025; 12:00	Arnardóttir, Eiríksdóttir 5	(13–15)	Fresvik 8	Morača Arena, Podgorica; Attendance: 75; Referees: Dragana Jakovljevic, Danijella Sando Kovacevic (SRB)
18 July 2025; 12:00		Report	4× (suspension)	Morača Arena, Podgorica; Attendance: 75; Referees: Dragana Jakovljevic, Danijella Sando Kovacevic (SRB)

18 July 2025; 14:30	Turkey	18–43	Sweden	Morača Arena, Podgorica; Attendance: 65; Referees: Ognjen Danilovic, Sebastijan Karan (BIH)
18 July 2025; 14:30	Seven, Sönmez 5	(8–20)	Bergling, Börjesson 6	Morača Arena, Podgorica; Attendance: 65; Referees: Ognjen Danilovic, Sebastijan Karan (BIH)
18 July 2025; 14:30	4× (suspension)	Report	1× (suspension)	Morača Arena, Podgorica; Attendance: 65; Referees: Ognjen Danilovic, Sebastijan Karan (BIH)

=== 15th place match ===
20 July 2025; 12:00	Iceland	36–24	Turkey	Morača Arena, Podgorica; Attendance: 80; Referees: Ron Peretz, Niv Schwartz (ISR)
20 July 2025; 12:00	Guðmundsdóttir, Þórhallsdóttir 7	(15–12)	Seven 9	Morača Arena, Podgorica; Attendance: 80; Referees: Ron Peretz, Niv Schwartz (ISR)
20 July 2025; 12:00	4× (suspension)	Report	3× (suspension)	Morača Arena, Podgorica; Attendance: 80; Referees: Ron Peretz, Niv Schwartz (ISR)

=== 13th place match ===
20 July 2025; 12:00	Norway	22–31	Sweden	Bemax Arena, Podgorica; Attendance: 50; Referees: Raúl Oyarzun, Aritz Zaragueta (ESP)
20 July 2025; 12:00	Fresvik 7	(9–17)	Norrgård 6	Bemax Arena, Podgorica; Attendance: 50; Referees: Raúl Oyarzun, Aritz Zaragueta (ESP)
20 July 2025; 12:00		Report	1× (suspension)	Bemax Arena, Podgorica; Attendance: 50; Referees: Raúl Oyarzun, Aritz Zaragueta (ESP)

=== 9th–12th place semifinals ===
18 July 2025; 12:00	Serbia	25–29	Romania	Bemax Arena, Podgorica; Attendance: 106; Referees: Ron Peretz, Niv Schwartz (ISR)
18 July 2025; 12:00	Nedeljković 10	(13–12)	Damian 11	Bemax Arena, Podgorica; Attendance: 106; Referees: Ron Peretz, Niv Schwartz (ISR)
18 July 2025; 12:00	1× (yellow card) 8× (suspension)	Report	4× (suspension) 1× (red card)	Bemax Arena, Podgorica; Attendance: 106; Referees: Ron Peretz, Niv Schwartz (ISR)

18 July 2025
14:30
Czech Republic
26–25
Poland
Bemax Arena, Podgorica
Attendance: 100
Referees: Barbora Bocakova, Lucia Janosikova (SVK)
four players 4
(17–8)
Zimnicka 6
3× (suspension)
Report
3× (suspension)

FT: 21–21 Pen: 5–4

=== 11th place match ===
20 July 2025; 14:30	Serbia	27–31	Poland	Verde Complex, Podgorica; Attendance: 60; Referees: Georgiana Murariu, Mihaela Paraschiv (ROU)
20 July 2025; 14:30	Otasevic 7	(16–16)	Pawlowska, Zimnicka 6	Verde Complex, Podgorica; Attendance: 60; Referees: Georgiana Murariu, Mihaela Paraschiv (ROU)
20 July 2025; 14:30	4× (suspension)	Report	4× (suspension) 1× (red card)	Verde Complex, Podgorica; Attendance: 60; Referees: Georgiana Murariu, Mihaela Paraschiv (ROU)

=== 9th place match ===
20 July 2025; 17:00	Romania	36–21	Czech Republic	Morača Arena, Podgorica; Attendance: 50; Referees: Bogdan Kaludjerovic, Ivan Vujacic (MNE)
20 July 2025; 17:00	Utan 8	(20–11)	three players 4	Morača Arena, Podgorica; Attendance: 50; Referees: Bogdan Kaludjerovic, Ivan Vujacic (MNE)
20 July 2025; 17:00	1× (suspension)	Report	3× (suspension)	Morača Arena, Podgorica; Attendance: 50; Referees: Bogdan Kaludjerovic, Ivan Vujacic (MNE)

== Championship playoffs ==
5th place match
France	30
Montenegro	28
7th place match
Croatia	16
Hungary	28

5th–8th place semifinals
France	20
Croatia	19
Hungary	33
Montenegro	36

Quarterfinals
1	France	26
8	Austria	29
4	Croatia	11
5	Spain	23
2	Denmark	20
7	Hungary	19
3	Germany	35
6	Montenegro	33

Semifinals
Austria	23
Spain	28
Denmark	31
Germany	37

Final
Spain	27
Germany	34
3rd place match
Austria	14
Denmark	38

=== Quarterfinals ===
17 July 2025; 17:00	France	26–29	Austria	Morača Arena, Podgorica; Attendance: 150; Referees: Mattias Fält, Mikael Holm (SWE)
17 July 2025; 17:00	Samaï 5	(13–12)	three players 6	Morača Arena, Podgorica; Attendance: 150; Referees: Mattias Fält, Mikael Holm (SWE)
17 July 2025; 17:00	3× (suspension)	Report	4× (suspension)	Morača Arena, Podgorica; Attendance: 150; Referees: Mattias Fält, Mikael Holm (SWE)

17 July 2025; 17:00	Croatia	11–23	Spain	Bemax Arena, Podgorica; Attendance: 100; Referees: Lucas Hellbusch, Darnel Jansen (GER)
17 July 2025; 17:00	Covic 4	(4–13)	Serrano Ortega 9	Bemax Arena, Podgorica; Attendance: 100; Referees: Lucas Hellbusch, Darnel Jansen (GER)
17 July 2025; 17:00	1× (yellow card) 6× (suspension)	Report	2× (suspension)	Bemax Arena, Podgorica; Attendance: 100; Referees: Lucas Hellbusch, Darnel Jansen (GER)

17 July 2025; 19:30	Denmark	20–19	Hungary	Morača Arena, Podgorica; Attendance: 85; Referees: Mathilde Cournil, Loriane Lamour (FRA)
17 July 2025; 19:30	Plougstrup 6	(10–12)	Fazekas 8	Morača Arena, Podgorica; Attendance: 85; Referees: Mathilde Cournil, Loriane Lamour (FRA)
17 July 2025; 19:30	1× (yellow card) 3× (suspension)	Report	1× (yellow card) 2× (suspension)	Morača Arena, Podgorica; Attendance: 85; Referees: Mathilde Cournil, Loriane Lamour (FRA)

17 July 2025; 19:30	Germany	35–33	Montenegro	Bemax Arena, Podgorica; Attendance: 1,200; Referees: Raúl Oyarzun, Aritz Zaragueta (ESP)
17 July 2025; 19:30	Däuble 7	(17–19)	Pelicic 9	Bemax Arena, Podgorica; Attendance: 1,200; Referees: Raúl Oyarzun, Aritz Zaragueta (ESP)
17 July 2025; 19:30	6× (suspension) 1× (red card)	Report	3× (suspension)	Bemax Arena, Podgorica; Attendance: 1,200; Referees: Raúl Oyarzun, Aritz Zaragueta (ESP)

=== 5th–8th place semifinals ===
18 July 2025; 17:00	France	20–19	Croatia	Morača Arena, Podgorica; Attendance: 150; Referees: Jakub Uhlir, Vojtech Benus (CZE)
18 July 2025; 17:00	Abdou 5	(11–10)	Vukovic 5	Morača Arena, Podgorica; Attendance: 150; Referees: Jakub Uhlir, Vojtech Benus (CZE)
18 July 2025; 17:00	1× (yellow card) 3× (suspension)	Report	1× (suspension)	Morača Arena, Podgorica; Attendance: 150; Referees: Jakub Uhlir, Vojtech Benus (CZE)

18 July 2025; 19:30	Hungary	33–36	Montenegro	Morača Arena, Podgorica; Attendance: 170; Referees: Georgiana Murariu, Mihaela Paraschiv (ROU)
18 July 2025; 19:30	Fazekas 7	(15–17)	Pelicic 9	Morača Arena, Podgorica; Attendance: 170; Referees: Georgiana Murariu, Mihaela Paraschiv (ROU)
18 July 2025; 19:30	4× (suspension)	Report	5× (suspension) 1× (red card)	Morača Arena, Podgorica; Attendance: 170; Referees: Georgiana Murariu, Mihaela Paraschiv (ROU)

=== 7th place match ===
20 July 2025; 14:30	Croatia	16–28	Hungary	Morača Arena, Podgorica; Attendance: 100; Referees: Mattias Fält, Mikael Holm (SWE)
20 July 2025; 14:30	Zubac 4	(8–12)	Szeibert 5	Morača Arena, Podgorica; Attendance: 100; Referees: Mattias Fält, Mikael Holm (SWE)
20 July 2025; 14:30	3× (suspension)	Report	4× (suspension)	Morača Arena, Podgorica; Attendance: 100; Referees: Mattias Fält, Mikael Holm (SWE)

=== 5th place match ===
20 July 2025; 14:30	France	30–28	Montenegro	Bemax Arena, Podgorica; Attendance: 400; Referees: Lucas Hellbusch, Darnel Jansen (GER)
20 July 2025; 14:30	Abdou, Injai 5	(13–13)	Pelicic 7	Bemax Arena, Podgorica; Attendance: 400; Referees: Lucas Hellbusch, Darnel Jansen (GER)
20 July 2025; 14:30	5× (suspension)	Report	1× (suspension)	Bemax Arena, Podgorica; Attendance: 400; Referees: Lucas Hellbusch, Darnel Jansen (GER)

=== Semifinals ===
18 July 2025; 17:00	Austria	23–28	Spain	Bemax Arena, Podgorica; Attendance: 300; Referees: Bruna Correa, Renata Correa (BRA)
18 July 2025; 17:00	Baljak 7	(12–13)	Julve Benages 7	Bemax Arena, Podgorica; Attendance: 300; Referees: Bruna Correa, Renata Correa (BRA)
18 July 2025; 17:00	1× (yellow card) 4× (suspension)	Report	1× (yellow card) 3× (suspension)	Bemax Arena, Podgorica; Attendance: 300; Referees: Bruna Correa, Renata Correa (BRA)

18 July 2025; 19:30	Denmark	31–37	Germany	Bemax Arena, Podgorica; Attendance: 400; Referees: Boris Cipov, Zoran Klus (SVK)
18 July 2025; 19:30	Plougstrup 9	(17–20)	Rohr 9	Bemax Arena, Podgorica; Attendance: 400; Referees: Boris Cipov, Zoran Klus (SVK)
18 July 2025; 19:30	3× (suspension)	Report	4× (suspension)	Bemax Arena, Podgorica; Attendance: 400; Referees: Boris Cipov, Zoran Klus (SVK)

=== 3rd place match ===
20 July 2025; 17:00	Austria	14–38	Denmark	Bemax Arena, Podgorica; Attendance: 1,100; Referees: Mathilde Cournil, Loriane Lamour (FRA)
20 July 2025; 17:00	Barnjak, Maticevic 3	(6–17)	Schleicher 8	Bemax Arena, Podgorica; Attendance: 1,100; Referees: Mathilde Cournil, Loriane Lamour (FRA)
20 July 2025; 17:00	5× (suspension)	Report	5× (suspension)	Bemax Arena, Podgorica; Attendance: 1,100; Referees: Mathilde Cournil, Loriane Lamour (FRA)

=== Final ===
20 July 2025; 19:30	Spain	27–34	Germany	Bemax Arena, Podgorica; Attendance: 1,500; Referees: Zsofia Marton, Rita Dane (HUN)
20 July 2025; 19:30	Rodríguez Lario 9	(17–13)	Bornhardt 9	Bemax Arena, Podgorica; Attendance: 1,500; Referees: Zsofia Marton, Rita Dane (HUN)
20 July 2025; 19:30	5× (suspension)	Report	2× (suspension)	Bemax Arena, Podgorica; Attendance: 1,500; Referees: Zsofia Marton, Rita Dane (HUN)

== Final standings ==
Rank	Team
1st place, gold medalist(s)	Germany
2nd place, silver medalist(s)	Spain
3rd place, bronze medalist(s)	Denmark
4	Austria
5	France
6	Montenegro
7	Hungary
8	Croatia
9	Romania
10	Czech Republic
11	Poland
12	Serbia
13	Sweden
14	Norway
15	Iceland
16	Turkey
17	Netherlands
18	Switzerland
19	Slovenia
20	Faroe Islands
21	Portugal
22	Finland
23	North Macedonia
24	Lithuania

Team qualified for the 2026 IHF Women's U20 Handball World Championship

== Awards ==
=== All star team ===
Source: EHF

Position	Player
Goalkeeper	(Spain) Goundo Gassama
Left wing	(Germany) Chiara Rohr
Left back	(Denmark) Anne Dolberg Plougstrup
Centre back	(Spain) Belen Rodriguez
Right back	(Germany) Lara Däuble
Right wing	(France) Blandine Gros
Pivot	(Austria) Aurelie Egbaimo
Top scorer	(Lithuania) Gabija Pilikauskaite (83 scores)
Best defense player	(Denmark) Clara Mendgaard Sørensen
Most valuable player	(Montenegro) Natalija Lekić

== See also ==
- 2025 European Women's U-17 Handball Championship
- 2025 Women's U-19 EHF Championship
- 2025 Women's U-17 EHF Championship
