= European Women's U-19 Handball Championship =

Handball event

The European Women's U-19 European Handball Championship is the official competition for junior women's national handball teams of Europe. Organized by the European Handball Federation, it takes place every two years. The competition received its current name in 2004, until then it was known as the European Women's Junior Handball Championship.

In addition to crowning the European champions, the tournament also serves as a qualifying tournament for the Women's Junior World Handball Championship.

== Medal summary ==
Year	Host	Final			Third place match		
Year	Host	Champion	Score	Runner-up	Third place	Score	Fourth place
1996; Details	Poland	Denmark	24 – 23	Ukraine	Russia	22 – 19	Norway
1998; Details	Slovakia	Romania	33 – 24	Lithuania	Russia	28 – 27	Turkey
2000; Details	France	Romania	30 – 28	Russia	Croatia	25 – 23	Sweden
2002; Details	Finland	Russia	25 – 24	Hungary	Spain	27 – 19	Netherlands
2004; Details	Czech Republic	Russia	25 – 24	Norway	Serbia & Montenegro	39 – 28	France
2007; Details	Turkey	Denmark	29 – 19	Spain	Romania	36 – 31	Sweden
2009; Details	Hungary	Norway	29 – 27	Hungary	Russia	29 – 24	Germany
2011; Details	Netherlands	Denmark	29 – 27	Netherlands	Austria	34 – 28	Serbia
2013; Details	Denmark	Russia	36 – 28	Hungary	Denmark	33 – 22	Norway
2015; Details	Spain	Denmark	29 – 26	Russia	Sweden	25 – 24	Hungary
2017; Details	Slovenia	France	31 – 26	~~Russia~~ DSQ*	Denmark	28 – 26	Hungary
2019; Details	Hungary	Hungary	27 – 20	Netherlands	Norway	29 – 26	Russia
2021; Details	Slovenia	Hungary	31 – 22	Russia	France	30 – 29	Sweden
2023; Details	Romania	Hungary	35 – 26	Denmark	Romania	39 – 32	Portugal
2025; Details	Montenegro	Germany	34 – 27	Spain	Denmark	38 – 14	Austria

Notes

- On 3 April 2018, the Russian team was disqualified and stripped of their silver medals, won at the 2017 edition, due to doping violations committed by three players on the team.

== Medal count ==
Rank	Nation	Gold	Silver	Bronze	Total
1	Denmark	4	2	2	8
2	Russia	3	3	3	9
3	Hungary	3	3	1	7
4	Romania	2	0	2	4
5	Norway	1	1	1	3
6	France	1	0	1	2
7	Germany	1	0	0	1
8	Spain	0	2	1	3
9	Netherlands	0	2	0	2
10	Lithuania	0	1	0	1
10	Ukraine	0	1	0	1
12	Austria	0	0	1	1
12	Croatia	0	0	1	1
12	Serbia and Montenegro	0	0	1	1
12	Sweden	0	0	1	1
Totals (15 entries)		15	15	15	45

- 2017 : Denmark silver and Hun bronze

=== Participating nations ===
Nation	(Poland) 1996	(Slovakia) 1998	(France) 2000	(Finland) 2002	(Czech Republic) 2004	(Turkey) 2007	(Hungary) 2009	(Netherlands) 2011	(Denmark) 2013	(Spain) 2015	(Slovenia) 2017	(Hungary) 2019	(Slovenia) 2021	(Romania) 2023	(Montenegro) 2025	Total
Austria	–	–	–	–	16th	14th	15th	3rd	9th	–	–	11th	14th	–	4th	8
Belarus	–	–	–	–	–	–	–	–	–	13th	–	–	–	–	–	1
Belgium	7th	–	–	–	–	–	–	–	–	–	–	–	–	–	–	1
Bulgaria	9th	–	–	–	–	–	–	–	–	–	–	–	–	–	–	1
Croatia	–	10th	3rd	–	5th	–	–	7th	13th	12th	12th	10th	7th	16th	8th	11
Czech Republic	–	7th	–	–	11th	–	–	–	14th	–	–	–	10th	12th	10th	6
Denmark	1st	–	10th	–	6th	1st	13th	1st	3rd	1st	2nd	6th	6th	2nd	3rd	13
Faroe Islands	–	–	–	–	–	–	–	–	–	–	–	–	–	–	20th	1
Finland	–	–	–	12th	–	–	–	–	–	–	–	–	–	–	22nd	2
France	5th	8th	11th	5th	4th	5th	5th	10th	7th	9th	1st	8th	3rd	6th	5th	15
Germany	10th	–	7th	11th	7th	9th	4th	11th	10th	5th	4th	9th	8th	11th	1st	14
Hungary	–	6th	8th	2nd	–	8th	2nd	14th	2nd	4th	3rd	1st	1st	1st	7th	13
Iceland	–	–	–	–	15th	–	–	–	–	–	–	–	–	13th	15th	3
Lithuania	–	2nd	–	10th	–	16th	–	–	–	16th	–	–	–	–	24th	5
Montenegro	–	–	–	–	–	–	9th	–	–	7th	7th	12th	13th	8th	6th	6
Netherlands	–	11th	–	4th	–	11th	8th	2nd	6th	–	5th	2nd	–	9th	17th	10
North Macedonia	–	–	–	–	–	–	–	–	–	15th	15th	–	–	15th	13th	4
Norway	4th	9th	6th	–	2nd	12th	1st	12th	4th	6th	6th	3rd	9th	10th	14th	14
Poland	8th	–	–	9th	8th	13th	12th	13th	–	–	–	–	–	–	11th	7
Portugal	–	–	–	–	14th	–	–	–	15th	14th	13th	14th	16th	4th	21st	8
Romania	6th	1st	1st	7th	10th	3rd	14th	6th	5th	10th	8th	5th	5th	3rd	9th	15
Russia	3rd	3rd	2nd	1st	1st	7th	3rd	9th	1st	2nd	~~16th~~ (Note: On 3 April 2018, the Russian team was disqualified and stripped of their silver medals, won at the 2017 edition, due to doping violations committed by three players on the team.)	4th	2nd	–	–	13
Serbia	–	–	–	–	–	10th	11th	4th	–	11th	14th	–	–	14th	12th	7
Slovenia	12th	–	–	8th	12th	6th	10th	15th	12th	–	11th	15th	15th	–	19th	11
Slovakia	–	12th	–	–	–	–	16th	–	16th	–	–	16th	12th	–	–	5
Spain	–	5th	5th	3rd	9th	2nd	6th	8th	11th	8th	10th	7th	–	–	2nd	12
Sweden	–	–	4th	6th	13th	4th	7th	5th	8th	3rd	9th	13th	4th	5th	13th	13
Switzerland	–	–	–	–	–	–	–	–	–	–	–	–	11th	7th	18th	3
Turkey	11th	4th	12th	–	–	15th	–	–	–	–	–	–	–	–	16th	5
Ukraine	2nd	–	–	–	–	–	–	16th	–	–	–	–	–	–	–	2
FR Yugoslavia	–	–	9th	–	3rd	–										2
Total	12	12	12	12	16	16	16	16	16	16	16	16	16	16	24	

== See also ==
- Junior World Championship
- Youth European Championship
- Youth World Championship
