= Russia women's national junior handball team =

Russia

Information
- Association: Handball Federation of Russia

Colours
1st	2nd

Results

IHF U-20 World Championship
- Appearances: 12 (First in 1993)
- Best result: (gold) Champions, (1993, 2001, 2003, 2005)

European Junior Championship
- Appearances: 13 (First in 1996)
- Best result: (gold) Champions, (2002, 2004, 2013)
- Last updated on Unknown.

The Russia women's junior national handball team is the national under-19 handball team of Russia. Controlled by the Handball Federation of Russia it represents the country in international matches.

In reaction to the 2022 Russian invasion of Ukraine, the International Handball Federation banned Russian and Belarus athletes and officials, and the European Handball Federation suspended the national teams of Russia and Belarus as well as Russian and Belarusian clubs competing in European handball competitions. Referees, officials, and commission members from Russia and Belarus will not be called upon for future activities. And new organisers will be sought for the YAC 16 EHF Beach Handball EURO and the Qualifier Tournaments for the Beach Handball EURO 2023, which were to be held in Moscow. In addition, it refused to allow competitions to be held in Russia or Belarus. The Russian Handball Federation failed in its appeal against the decision to exclude Russia's teams from continental competition, which was rejected by the European Handball Federation Court of Handball.

== History ==
=== IHF World Championship ===
Champions Runners up Third place Fourth place

IHF Junior World Championship record
Year	Round	Position	GP	W	D	L	GS	GA	GD
(Romania) 1977	See Soviet Union								
(Socialist Federal Republic of Yugoslavia) 1979	See Soviet Union								
(Canada) 1981	See Soviet Union								
(France) 1983	See Soviet Union								
(South Korea) 1985	See Soviet Union								
(Denmark) 1987	See Soviet Union								
(Nigeria) 1989	See Soviet Union								
(France) 1991	See Soviet Union								
(Bulgaria) 1993	Final	Champions	7	6	0	1	174	135	+39
(Brazil) 1995	Quarterfinals	8th place	8	4	0	4	199	183	+16
(Ivory Coast) 1997	Final	Runners-up	7	6	0	1	224	157	+67
(China) 1999	2nd Group	5th place	8	6	0	2	198	144	+54
(Hungary) 2001	Final	Champions	9	7	1	1	306	246	+60
(North Macedonia) 2003	Final	Champions	9	9	0	0	299	208	+91
(Czech Republic) 2005	Final	Champions	9	9	0	0	272	193	+79
(North Macedonia) 2008	Did not participate								
(South Korea) 2010	Final	Runners-up	10	8	0	2	321	232	+89
(Czech Republic) 2012	Quarterfinals	5th place	9	8	0	1	263	221	+42
(Croatia) 2014	Final	Runners-up	9	8	0	1	312	229	+83
(Russia) 2016	Final	Runners-up	9	8	0	1	317	199	+118
(Hungary) 2018	Semifinals	4th Place	9	7	0	2	261	193	+68
(Romania) 2020	Cancelled due to COVID-19 pandemic in Europe								
(Slovenia) 2022	Disqualified for invading Ukraine								
Total	12 / 21	4 Titles	103	86	1	16	3146	2340	+806

=== European Championship ===
Champions Runners up Third place Fourth place

European Junior Championship record
Year	Round	Position	GP	W	D	L	GS	GA	GD
(Poland) 1996	Semifinals	3rd place	7	5	1	1	174	147	+27
(Slovakia) 1998	Semifinals	3rd place	6	4	0	2	156	119	+37
(France) 2000	Final	Runners-up	7	5	0	2	232	193	+39
(Finland) 2002	Final	Champions	7	7	0	0	223	141	+82
(Czech Republic) 2004	Final	Champions	7	7	0	0	212	174	+38
(Turkey) 2007	2nd Round	7th place	7	4	0	3	176	190	–14
(Hungary) 2009	Semifinals	3rd place	7	4	1	2	218	190	+18
(Netherlands) 2011	1st Round	9th place	7	5	0	2	204	164	+40
(Denmark) 2013	Final	Champions	7	7	0	0	222	165	+57
(Spain) 2015	Final	Runners-up	8	5	1	2	220	170	+50
(Slovenia) 2017	Disqualified								
(Hungary) 2019	Semifinals	4th place	7	4	0	3	223	170	+53
(Slovenia) 2021	Final	Runners-up	7	5	0	2	203	191	+12
Total	13 / 13	3 titles	92	68	3	21	2674	2184	+490
