= 2015 European Women's U-19 Handball Championship =

Tournament details
- Host country: Spain
- Venues: 2 (in 1 host city)
- Dates: 23 July – 2 August
- Teams: 16 (from 1 confederation)

Final positions
- Champions: Denmark (4th title)
- Runners-up: Russia
- Third place: Sweden
- Fourth place: Hungary

Tournament statistics
- Matches played: 56
- Goals scored: 2,843 (50.77 per match)
- Top scorers: (Montenegro) Đurđina Jauković (71 goals)

Awards
- Best player: (Montenegro) Đurđina Jauković

The 2015 European Women's U-19 Handball Championship was the tenth edition of the European Women's U-19 Handball Championship, held in Valencia, Spain from 23 July to 2 August 2015. Sixteen teams participated on the tournament, including the fifteen qualifying winners and the host nation. Sweden was the defending champions, but didn't reached the final, after getting defeated by Denmark in the semifinals. Denmark won the tournament, with a 29-26 win against Russia.

== Qualification ==
Competition	Dates	Host	Vacancies	Qualified
Host nation			1	Spain
Women's 17 EHF EURO 2013	15–25 August 2013	(Poland) Gdynia	2	Sweden; Russia
Qualification tournament	17-19 April 2015	Various	13	Denmark; Germany; France; Croatia; Lithuania; North Macedonia; Montenegro; Norway; Portugal; Romania; Serbia; Hungary; Belarus

== Draw ==
The draw was held on 5 May 2015 in Valencia.

Pot 1	Pot 2	Pot 3	Pot 4
Sweden; Russia; Denmark; Portugal	North Macedonia; Romania; Norway; Croatia	Hungary; Germany; Spain; Montenegro	France; Belarus; Serbia; Lithuania

== Referees ==
Referees
Denmark	Karina Christiansen; Line Hesseldal Hansen
Spain	Carlos Luque; Ignacio Pascual
Lithuania	Viktorija Kijauskaitė; Aušra Žalienė
Montenegro	Anđelina Kažanegra; Jelena Vujačić
Russia	Viktoria Alpaidze; Tatiana Berezkina

Referees
Serbia	Vanja Antić; Jelena Jakovljević
Austria	Ana Vranes; Marlis Wenninger
Moldova	Dorian Sîrbu; Valentin Suponicov
Bosnia and Herzegovina	Vesna Todorović; Tatjana Praštalo

== Preliminary round ==
All times are local (UTC+2).

=== Group A ===
Pos	Team	Pld	W	D	L	GF	GA	GD	Pts	Qualification
1	Denmark	3	3	0	0	85	59	+26	6	Main round
2	Montenegro	3	2	0	1	66	54	+12	4	Main round
3	Croatia	3	1	0	2	58	73	−15	2	Intermediate round
4	Serbia	3	0	0	3	58	81	−23	0	Intermediate round

Source: EHF
Rules for classification: 1) points; 2) head-to-head points; 3) head-to-head goal difference; 4) head-to-head goals scored; 5) goal difference; 6) goals scored; 7) draw.

23 July 2015; 16:00	Denmark	21 - 20	Montenegro	Polideportivo El Cabañal, Valencia; Attendance: 200; Referees: Luque, Pascual (ESP)
23 July 2015; 16:00	Nielsen 5	(12-8)	Jauković, Ramusović 4	Polideportivo El Cabañal, Valencia; Attendance: 200; Referees: Luque, Pascual (ESP)
23 July 2015; 16:00	2× (yellow card) 6× (suspension)	Report	3× (yellow card) 3× (suspension)	Polideportivo El Cabañal, Valencia; Attendance: 200; Referees: Luque, Pascual (ESP)

23 July 2015; 18:00	Croatia	20 - 24	Serbia	Polideportivo El Cabañal, Valencia; Attendance: 70; Referees: Sîrbu, Suponicov (MLD)
23 July 2015; 18:00	Mamić 9	(8-13)	Kovačević 7	Polideportivo El Cabañal, Valencia; Attendance: 70; Referees: Sîrbu, Suponicov (MLD)
23 July 2015; 18:00	2× (yellow card) 8× (suspension) 1× (red card)	Report	3× (yellow card) 9× (suspension)	Polideportivo El Cabañal, Valencia; Attendance: 70; Referees: Sîrbu, Suponicov (MLD)

24 July 2015; 16:00	Serbia	18 - 32	Denmark	Polideportivo El Cabañal, Valencia; Attendance: 150; Referees: Luque, Pascual (ESP)
24 July 2015; 16:00	Kovačević 5	(9-16)	Nolsøe 7	Polideportivo El Cabañal, Valencia; Attendance: 150; Referees: Luque, Pascual (ESP)
24 July 2015; 16:00	1× (yellow card) 6× (suspension)	Report	3× (yellow card) 7× (suspension)	Polideportivo El Cabañal, Valencia; Attendance: 150; Referees: Luque, Pascual (ESP)

24 July 2015; 18:00	Montenegro	25 - 17	Croatia	Polideportivo El Cabañal, Valencia; Attendance: 50; Referees: Vranes, Wenninger (AUT)
24 July 2015; 18:00	Jauković 7	(15-8)	Kalaus 5	Polideportivo El Cabañal, Valencia; Attendance: 50; Referees: Vranes, Wenninger (AUT)
24 July 2015; 18:00	3× (yellow card) 5× (suspension)	Report	3× (yellow card) 7× (suspension)	Polideportivo El Cabañal, Valencia; Attendance: 50; Referees: Vranes, Wenninger (AUT)

26 July 2015; 16:00	Montenegro	21 - 16	Serbia	Polideportivo El Cabañal, Valencia; Attendance: 100; Referees: Praštalo, Todorović (BIH)
26 July 2015; 16:00	Jauković 7	(10-9)	Kovačević 5	Polideportivo El Cabañal, Valencia; Attendance: 100; Referees: Praštalo, Todorović (BIH)
26 July 2015; 16:00	3× (yellow card) 8× (suspension)	Report	2× (yellow card) 2× (suspension)	Polideportivo El Cabañal, Valencia; Attendance: 100; Referees: Praštalo, Todorović (BIH)

26 July 2015; 18:00	Denmark	32 - 21	Croatia	Polideportivo El Cabañal, Valencia; Attendance: 120; Referees: Vranes, Wenninger (AUT)
26 July 2015; 18:00	Nielsen, Petersen 5	(16-11)	Mamić 7	Polideportivo El Cabañal, Valencia; Attendance: 120; Referees: Vranes, Wenninger (AUT)
26 July 2015; 18:00	3× (yellow card) 4× (suspension)	Report	3× (yellow card) 7× (suspension) 1× (red card)	Polideportivo El Cabañal, Valencia; Attendance: 120; Referees: Vranes, Wenninger (AUT)

== Final round ==
=== Bracket ===
Championship bracket

Semifinals
31 July – 19:30
Russia	28
Hungary	17
31 July – 22:00
Sweden	20
Denmark	28

Final
2 August – 13:30
Russia	26
Denmark	29
Third place
2 August – 11:00
Hungary	24
Sweden	25

9th place bracket

5–8th place semifinals
31 July – 14:30
Germany	26
Spain	24
31 July – 17:00
Norway	29
Montenegro	27

5th place
1 August – 17:00
Germany	29
Norway	27
7th place
1 August – 14:30
Spain	33
Montenegro	37

31 July 2015; 14:30	Germany	26–24	Spain	Pabellón Universitario, Valencia; Attendance: 120; Referees: Antić, Jakovljević (SRB)
31 July 2015; 14:30	Bölk 7	(14-9)	Etxeberria 7	Pabellón Universitario, Valencia; Attendance: 120; Referees: Antić, Jakovljević (SRB)
31 July 2015; 14:30	3× (yellow card) 5× (suspension)	Report	3× (yellow card) 3× (suspension)	Pabellón Universitario, Valencia; Attendance: 120; Referees: Antić, Jakovljević (SRB)

31 July 2015; 17:00	Norway	29–27	Montenegro	Pabellón Universitario, Valencia; Attendance: 100; Referees: Alpaidze, Berezkina (RUS)
31 July 2015; 17:00	Kallestad 6	(16-13)	Jauković 15	Pabellón Universitario, Valencia; Attendance: 100; Referees: Alpaidze, Berezkina (RUS)
31 July 2015; 17:00	2× (yellow card) 5× (suspension) 1× (red card)	Report	2× (yellow card) 4× (suspension)	Pabellón Universitario, Valencia; Attendance: 100; Referees: Alpaidze, Berezkina (RUS)

=== Seventh place game ===
1 August 2015; 19:30	Spain	33–27	Montenegro	Pabellón Universitario, Valencia; Attendance: 350; Referees: Christiansen, Hansen (DEN)
1 August 2015; 19:30	Espiñeira 12	(11-14)	Jauković 15	Pabellón Universitario, Valencia; Attendance: 350; Referees: Christiansen, Hansen (DEN)
1 August 2015; 19:30	3× (yellow card) 3× (suspension)	Report	3× (yellow card) 9× (suspension)	Pabellón Universitario, Valencia; Attendance: 350; Referees: Christiansen, Hansen (DEN)

=== Semifinals ===
31 July 2015; 19:30	Russia	28–17	Hungary	Pabellón Universitario, Valencia; Attendance: 250; Referees: Luque, Pascual (ESP)
31 July 2015; 19:30	Egorova 7	(13-9)	Ferenczy 4	Pabellón Universitario, Valencia; Attendance: 250; Referees: Luque, Pascual (ESP)
31 July 2015; 19:30	3× (yellow card) 2× (suspension)	Report	3× (yellow card) 1× (suspension)	Pabellón Universitario, Valencia; Attendance: 250; Referees: Luque, Pascual (ESP)

31 July 2015; 22:00	Sweden	20–28	Denmark	Pabellón Universitario, Valencia; Attendance: 290; Referees: Vujačić, Kažanegra (MNE)
31 July 2015; 22:00	Hvenfelt 5	(9-16)	Højlund 7	Pabellón Universitario, Valencia; Attendance: 290; Referees: Vujačić, Kažanegra (MNE)
31 July 2015; 22:00	3× (yellow card) 3× (suspension)	Report	3× (yellow card) 4× (suspension)	Pabellón Universitario, Valencia; Attendance: 290; Referees: Vujačić, Kažanegra (MNE)

=== Fifth place game ===
1 August 2015; 22:00	Germany	29–27	Norway	Pabellón Universitario, Valencia; Attendance: 200; Referees: Kijauskaitė, Žalienė (LTU)
1 August 2015; 22:00	Six players 4	(14-12)	Hernes 7	Pabellón Universitario, Valencia; Attendance: 200; Referees: Kijauskaitė, Žalienė (LTU)
1 August 2015; 22:00	1× (yellow card) 3× (suspension)	Report	3× (yellow card) 5× (suspension)	Pabellón Universitario, Valencia; Attendance: 200; Referees: Kijauskaitė, Žalienė (LTU)

=== Third place match ===
2 August 2015; 11:00	Hungary	24–25	Sweden	Pabellón Universitario, Valencia; Attendance: 450; Referees: Christiansen, Hansen (DEN)
2 August 2015; 11:00	Horváth 6	(11-11)	Olofsson 8	Pabellón Universitario, Valencia; Attendance: 450; Referees: Christiansen, Hansen (DEN)
2 August 2015; 11:00	1× (yellow card) 5× (suspension)	Report	3× (yellow card) 2× (suspension)	Pabellón Universitario, Valencia; Attendance: 450; Referees: Christiansen, Hansen (DEN)

=== Final ===
2 August 2015; 13:30	Russia	26–29	Denmark	Pabellón Universitario, Valencia; Attendance: 1,000; Referees: Vranes, Wenninger (AUT)
2 August 2015; 13:30	Frolova 8	(10-13)	Højlund, Nolsøe 8	Pabellón Universitario, Valencia; Attendance: 1,000; Referees: Vranes, Wenninger (AUT)
2 August 2015; 13:30	3× (yellow card) 4× (suspension)	Report	3× (yellow card) 4× (suspension)	Pabellón Universitario, Valencia; Attendance: 1,000; Referees: Vranes, Wenninger (AUT)

== Final ranking ==
Qualified for the 2016 Women's Junior World Handball Championship

Rank	Team
1st place, gold medalist(s)	Denmark
2nd place, silver medalist(s)	Russia
3rd place, bronze medalist(s)	Sweden
4	Hungary
5	Germany
6	Norway
7	Montenegro
8	Spain
9	France
10	Romania
11	Serbia
12	Croatia
13	Belarus
14	Portugal
15	North Macedonia
16	Lithuania

=== All Star Team ===
The All Star Team and awards were announced on 2 August 2015.

Position	Player
Goalkeeper	Tonje Haug Lerstad (NOR)
Right wing	Maitane Etxeberria (ESP)
Right back	Celine Lundbye Kristiansen (DEN)
Centre back	Yaroslava Frolova (RUS)
Left back	Emily Bölk (GER)
Left wing	Marianna Egorova (RUS)
Pivot	Sara Hald (DEN)
Best defense player	Sofia Hvenfelt (SWE)
Top scorer	Đurđina Jauković (MNE)
Most valuable player	Đurđina Jauković (MNE)

=== Top goalscorers ===
Top goalscorers
Rank	Name	Team	Goals
1	Đurđina Jauković	Montenegro	71
2	Bianca Bazaliu	Romania	64
3	Brigita Ivanauskaitė	Lithuania	58
4	Sara Ristovska	North Macedonia	50
5	Emily Bölk	Germany	47
6	Josipa Mamić	Croatia	45
7	Sandra Santiago	Portugal	42
7	Érika Tavares	Portugal	42
9	Inesa Verbovik	Lithuania	39
9	Marie-Hélène Sajka	France	39
