= Marianna Egorova =

Russian handball player

Personal information
- Full name: Marianna Igorevna Egorova
- Nationality: Russian
- Born: 6 August 1997 (age 29) Maykop, Russia
- Height: 1.72 m (5 ft 8 in)

Sport
- Sport: Handball
- Position: Left wing
- Current club: Zvezda Zvenigorod
- Number: 10

Senior clubs
- Years: Team
- 2014-: Zvezda Zvenigorod
Medal record
World Junior Championship
Silver medal – second place	2016 Russia
European Junior Championship
Silver medal – second place	2015 Spain
Youth Olympic Games
Silver medal – second place	2014 Nanjing

Marianna Egorova (Russian: Марианна Игоревна Егорова; born 6 August 1997) is a Russian female handball player for Zvezda Zvenigorod in the Russian Super League.

She also represented Russia in the 2016 Women's Junior World Handball Championship, placing as runners-up.

On 14 March 2020, she extended her contract with Zvezda Zvenigorod, until the summer of 2021.

== Achievements ==
- Russian Super League
  - Bronze Medalist: 2015
- Russian Cup:
  - Bronze Medalist: 2019
- World Junior Championship:
  - Silver Medalist: 2016
- European Junior Championship:
  - Silver Medalist: 2015

== Individual awards ==
- All-Star Left wing of the European Junior Championship: 2015
