= Sweden women's national junior handball team =

Sweden

Information
- Association: Swedish Handball Federation
- Coach: Fredrik Söderberg; Jennie Linnéll

Colours
1st	2nd

Results

IHF U-20 World Championship
- Appearances: 16 (First in 1983)
- Best result: (gold) Champions (2012)

European Junior Championship
- Appearances: 14 (First in 1996)
- Best result: (bronze) Third (2015)
- Last updated on Unknown.

The Sweden women's junior national handball team is the national under-19 handball team of Sweden. Controlled by the Swedish Handball Federation it represents the country in international matches.

== History ==
=== World Championship ===
Champions Runners up Third place Fourth place

IHF Junior World Championship record
Year	Round	Position	GP	W	D	L	GS	GA	GD
(Romania) 1977	Didn't Qualify								
(Socialist Federal Republic of Yugoslavia) 1979	Didn't Qualify								
(Canada) 1981	Didn't Qualify								
(France) 1983		6th place							
(South Korea) 1985	Didn't Qualify								
(Denmark) 1987		10th place							
(Nigeria) 1989		5th place							
(France) 1991	Semi-finals	4th place							
(Bulgaria) 1993		9th place							
(Brazil) 1995	Didn't Qualify								
(Ivory Coast) 1997	Didn't Qualify								
(China) 1999	Didn't Qualify								
(Hungary) 2001		8th place							
(North Macedonia) 2003		6th place							
(Czech Republic) 2005		18th place							
(North Macedonia) 2008	Didn't Qualify								
(South Korea) 2010		8th place							
(Czech Republic) 2012	Final	Champions							
(Croatia) 2014		13th place							
(Russia) 2016		6th place							
(Hungary) 2018		12th place							
(Slovenia) 2022	Semi-finals	4th place							
(North Macedonia) 2024		6th place							
(China) 2026		9th place							
Total	16/24	1 Title							

=== European Championship ===
Champions Runners up Third place Fourth place

European Junior Championship record
Year	Round	Position	GP	W	D	L	GS	GA	GD
(Poland) 1996	?	?	?	?	?	?	?	?	?
(Slovakia) 1998	Didn't Qualify								
(France) 2000	Semi-finals	4th place							
(Finland) 2002		6th place							
(Czech Republic) 2004		11th place							
(Turkey) 2007	Semi-finals	4th place							
(Hungary) 2009		7th place							
(Netherlands) 2011		5th place							
(Denmark) 2013		8th place							
(Spain) 2015	Semi-finals	Third place							
(Slovenia) 2017		10th place							
(Hungary) 2019		13th place							
(Slovenia) 2021	Semi-finals	4th place							
(Romania) 2023		5th place							
(Montenegro) 2025		13th place							
Total	14/15	0 Titles							
