= Spain women's national junior handball team =

Spain

Information
- Association: Spanish Handball Federation
- Coach: Joaquín Rocamora

Colours
1st	2nd

Results

IHF U-20 World Championship
- Appearances: 13 (First in 1985)
- Best result: 4th (2001, 2008)

European Junior Championship
- Appearances: 12 (First in 1996)
- Best result: (silver) Runners up (2007, 2025)
- Last updated on Unknown.

The Spain women's junior national handball team is the national under-19 handball team of Spain. Controlled by the Royal Spanish Handball Federation it represents Spain in international matches.

== History ==
=== IHF World Championship ===
Champions Runners up Third place Fourth place

IHF Junior World Championship record
Year	Round	Position	GP	W	D	L	GS	GA	GD
(Romania) 1977	Didn't Qualify								
(Socialist Federal Republic of Yugoslavia) 1979	Didn't Qualify								
(Canada) 1981	Didn't Qualify								
(France) 1983	Didn't Qualify								
(South Korea) 1985		15th place							
(Denmark) 1987		11th place							
(Nigeria) 1989		8th place							
(France) 1991	Didn't Qualify								
(Bulgaria) 1993	Didn't Qualify								
(Brazil) 1995	Didn't Qualify								
(Ivory Coast) 1997	Didn't Qualify								
(China) 1999		6th place							
(Hungary) 2001	Semi-finals	4th place							
(North Macedonia) 2003	Didn't Qualify								
(Czech Republic) 2005		11th place							
(North Macedonia) 2008	Semi-finals	4th place							
(South Korea) 2010		10th place							
(Czech Republic) 2012		14th place							
(Croatia) 2014	Didn't Qualify								
(Russia) 2016		12th place							
(Hungary) 2018	President's Cup	17th place	7	4	0	3	194	181	+13
(Slovenia) 2022	Didn't Qualify								
(North Macedonia) 2024		17th place							
(China) 2026	Semi-finals	4th place							
Total	13/24	0 Titles							

=== European Championship ===
Champions Runners up Third place Fourth place

European Junior Championship record
Year	Round	Position	GP	W	D	L	GS	GA	GD
(Poland) 1996									
(Slovakia) 1998		5th place							
(France) 2000		5th place							
(Finland) 2002	Semi-finals	Third place							
(Czech Republic) 2004		6th place							
(Turkey) 2007	Final	Runners-Up							
(Hungary) 2009		6th place							
(Netherlands) 2011		8th place							
(Denmark) 2013		11th place							
(Spain) 2015		8th place							
(Slovenia) 2017		11th place							
(Hungary) 2019		7th place							
(Slovenia) 2021	Did not qualify								
(Romania) 2023	Did not qualify								
(Montenegro) 2025		Runners-Up							
Total	12/15	0 Titles							
