= Maitane Etxeberria =

Spanish handball player (born 1997)

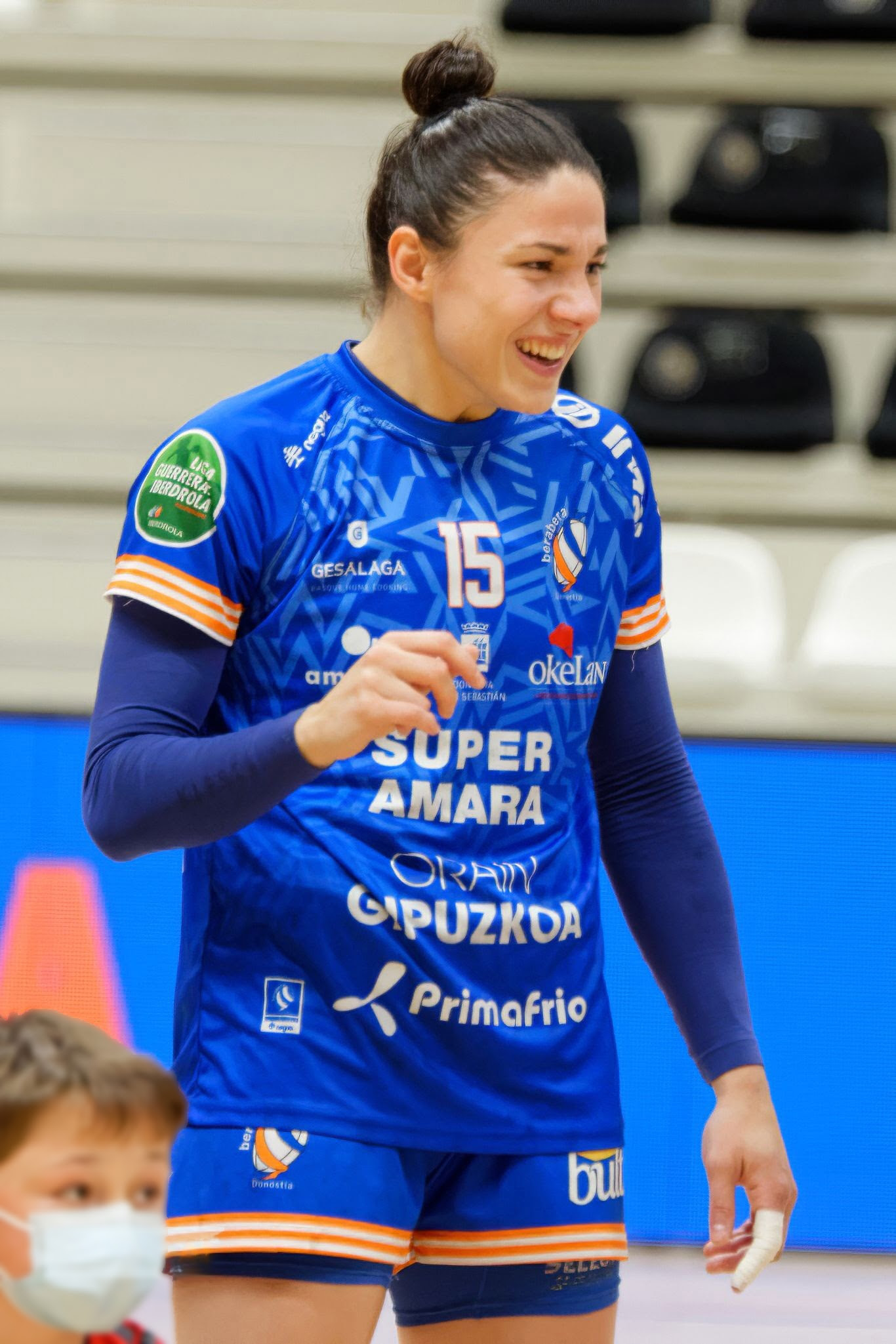
- Maitane Etxeberria Martínez (2021)

Personal information
- Full name: Maitane Etxeberria Martínez
- Nationality: Spanish
- Born: 15 January 1997 (age 29) Lezo, Spain
- Height: 1.68 m (5 ft 6 in)

Sport
- Sport: Handball
- Position: Right wing
- Current club: Super Amara Bera Bera
- Number: 15

Senior clubs
- Years: Team
- 2013–: Super Amara Bera Bera
National team
Years	Team	Apps	(Gls)
2017–	Spain	38	(58)
Medal record
World Championship
Silver medal – second place	2019 Japan
Mediterranean Games
Gold medal – first place	2018 Tarragona	Team

Maitane Etxeberria Martínez (Note: In this Spanish name, the first or paternal surname is Etxeberria and the second or maternal family name is Martínez.) (also spelled Echeverría, born 15 January 1997) is a Spanish female handballer for Super Amara Bera Bera and the Spanish national team.

She competed at the 2018 Mediterranean Games and the 2024 Summer Olympics.

== Achievements ==
- División de Honor:
  - Winner: 2014, 2015, 2016, 2018
  - Silver Medalist: 2017
- Copa de la Reina:
  - Winner: 2014, 2016
  - Finalist: 2015, 2017
- Supercopa de España:
  - Winner: 2014, 2015, 2016, 2017

== Individual awards ==
- All-Star Right Wing of the EHF Junior European Championship: 2015
