= Norway women's national junior handball team =

Norway

Information
- Association: Norwegian Handball Federation
- Coach: Axel Stefánsson

Colours
1st	2nd

Results

IHF U-20 World Championship
- Appearances: 19 (First in 1977)
- Best result: (gold) 1st (2010, 2022)

European Junior Championship
- Appearances: 15 (First in 1996)
- Best result: (gold) 1st (2009)
- Last updated on Unknown.

The Norway women's junior national handball team is the national under-19 handball team of Norway. Controlled by the Norwegian Handball Federation it represents the country in international matches.

== History ==
=== World Championship ===
Champions Runners up Third place Fourth place

IHF Junior World Championship record
Year	Round	Position	GP	W	D	L	GS	GA	GD
(Romania) 1977		7th place							
(Socialist Federal Republic of Yugoslavia) 1979		7th place							
(Canada) 1981	Did not qualify								
(France) 1983		9th place							
(South Korea) 1985		5th place							
(Denmark) 1987		8th place							
(Nigeria) 1989	Did not qualify								
(France) 1991	Did not qualify								
(Bulgaria) 1993	Did not qualify								
(Brazil) 1995	Semi final	Third place							
(Ivory Coast) 1997	Semi final	4th place							
(China) 1999		7th place							
(Hungary) 2001		6th place							
(North Macedonia) 2003	Semi final	Third place							
(Czech Republic) 2005	Final	Runners-Up							
(North Macedonia) 2008	Did not qualify								
(South Korea) 2010	Final	Champions							
(Czech Republic) 2012		8th place							
(Croatia) 2014		9th place							
(Russia) 2016		5th place							
(Hungary) 2018	Final	Runners-Up							
(Slovenia) 2022	Final	Champions							
(North Macedonia) 2024		10th place							
(China) 2026		8th place							
Total	19/24	2 Titles							

=== European Championship ===
Champions Runners up Third place Fourth place

European Junior Championship record
Year	Round	Position	GP	W	D	L	GS	GA	GD
(Poland) 1996	Semi final	4th place							
(Slovakia) 1998		9th place							
(France) 2000		6th place							
(Finland) 2002	Did not qualify								
(Czech Republic) 2004	Semi final	Third place							
(Turkey) 2007		12th place							
(Hungary) 2009	Final	Champions							
(Netherlands) 2011		12th place							
(Denmark) 2013	Semi final	4th place							
(Spain) 2015		6th place							
(Slovenia) 2017		7th place							
(Hungary) 2019		Third place							
(Slovenia) 2021		9th place							
(Romania) 2023		10th place							
(Montenegro) 2025		14th place							
Total	14/15	1 Title							
