= Denmark women's national junior handball team =

Denmark

Information
- Association: Danish Handball Federation
- Coach: Ole Lund Bitsch

Colours
1st	2nd

Results

IHF U-20 World Championship
- Appearances: 23 (First in 1977)
- Best result: (gold) Champions (1997, 2016 )

European Junior Championship
- Appearances: 14 (First in 1996)
- Best result: (gold) Champions (1996, 2007, 2011, 2015)
- Last updated on Unknown.

Denmark women's national junior handball team
Medal record

Representing Denmark

Handball

World Championship
Gold medal – first place	1997	
Gold medal – first place	2016	
Silver medal – second place	1987	
Silver medal – second place	1995	
Silver medal – second place	2008	
Silver medal – second place	2026	
Bronze medal – third place	1991	
Bronze medal – third place	1999	
Bronze medal – third place	2014	

European Championship
Gold medal – first place	1996	
Gold medal – first place	2007	
Gold medal – first place	2011	
Gold medal – first place	2015	
Silver medal – second place	2023	
Bronze medal – third place	2013	
Bronze medal – third place	2017	
Bronze medal – third place	2025	

The Denmark women's junior national handball team is the national under-19 handball team of Denmark. Controlled by the Danish Handball Federation it represents Denmark in international matches.

== History ==
=== World Championship ===
Year	Round	Position	GP	W	D	L	GS	GA	GD
Romania 1977	First Round	10th Place	5	1	1	3	61	65	–4
Yugoslavia 1979	Final Group	5th Place	7	3	0	4	117	97	+20
Canada 1981	Final Group	5th Place	7	3	0	4	125	136	–11
France 1983	First Round	10th Place	6	4	0	2	117	112	+5
Korea 1985	Second Group	11th Place	9	2	1	6	161	178	–17
Denmark 1987	Final Round	2nd Place	6	4	0	2	112	106	+6
Nigeria 1989	Second Group	7th Place	7	4	0	3	168	142	+26
France 1991	Semi Finals	Third Place	7	6	0	1	175	139	+36
Bulgaria 1993	Semi Finals	4th Place	7	4	0	3	170	153	+17
Brazil 1995	Final Round	2nd Place	8	7	0	1	210	166	+44
Côte d'Ivoire 1997	Final Round	Champions	8	8	0	0	212	151	+61
China 1999	Semi Finals	Third Place	9	6	0	3	223	193	+30
Hungary 2001	Second Group	7th Place	8	4	0	4	202	203	–1
Macedonia 2003	Second Group	7th Place	8	3	1	4	203	207	–4
Czech Republic 2005	Second Group	5th Place	8	5	0	3	221	198	+23
Macedonia 2008	Final Round	2nd Place	9	7	1	1	272	228	+44
Korea 2010	Didn't qualify								
Czech Republic 2012	Eight Finals	9th Place	8	5	0	3	207	172	+35
Croatia 2014	Semi Finals	Third Place	9	8	0	1	270	213	+57
Russia 2016	Final Round	Champions							
Hungary 2018	Quarterfinals	6th Place							
Romania 2020									
Slovenia 2022	Quarterfinals	5th Place							
Slovenia 2024	Semi Finals	4th Place							
China 2026	Final Round	2nd Place							
Total	23/24	2 Titles							

=== European Championship ===
Year	Round	Position	GP	W	D	L	GS	GA	GD
Poland 1996	Final Round	Champions							
Slovakia 1998									
France 2000									
Finland 2002									
Czech Republic 2004									
Turkey 2007	Final Round	Champions							
Hungary 2009									
Netherlands 2011	Final Round	Champions							
Denmark 2013	Semi Finals	Third Place							
Spain 2015	Final Round	Champions							
Slovenia 2017	Semi Finals	Third Place							
Hungary 2019	Quarterfinals	6th Place							
Slovenia 2021	Main Round	6th Place							
Romania 2023	Final Round	Second Place							
Montenegro 2025		Third Place							
Total	15/15	4 Titles							
