= France women's national junior handball team =

France

Information
- Association: Fédération Française de Handball
- Coach: Éric Baradat

Colours
| 1st | 2nd |

Results

IHF U-20 World Championship
- Appearances: 19 (First in 1977)
- Best result: (gold) Champions (2024)

European Junior Championship
- Appearances: 14 (First in 1996)
- Best result: (gold) Champions (2017)
- Last updated on Unknown.

The France women's junior national handball team is the national under-20 handball team of France.

Controlled by the French Handball Federation, it represents the country in international matches.

It competes in the IHF U20 Handball World Championship (aka the "Women's Junior (U20) World Championship") and the European U-19 Handball Championship (called the W19 EHF EURO), which it has both won once.

The team is referred as the "U20" and "U20F".

Head coach Éric Baradat was previously assistant coach of the french women's senior national team (2002–2013 and for the 2016 Olympics games).

== Achievements ==
IHF Junior World Championship:

- Winners: 2024
- 2nd place: 2012
- 3rd place: 2026

European U-19 Handball Championship:

- Winners: 2017
- 3rd place: 2021

== History ==
=== World Championship ===
Champions Runners up Third place Fourth place

IHF Junior World Championship record
| Year | Round | Position | GP | W | D | L | GS | GA | GD |
|---|---|---|---|---|---|---|---|---|---|
| (Romania) 1977 | Group Stage | 13th place | 5 | 1 | 0 | 4 | 43 | 63 | -20 |
| (Socialist Federal Republic of Yugoslavia) 1979 | | 6th place | | | | | | | |
| (Canada) 1981 | | 7th place | | | | | | | |
| (France) 1983 | | 8th place | | | | | | | |
| (South Korea) 1985 | | 10th place | | | | | | | |
| (Denmark) 1987 | | 9th place | | | | | | | |
| (Nigeria) 1989 | Didn't Qualify | | | | | | | | |
| (France) 1991 | | 12th place | | | | | | | |
| (Bulgaria) 1993 | Didn't Qualify | | | | | | | | |
| (Brazil) 1995 | Quarterfinals | 5th place | | | | | | | |
| (Ivory Coast) 1997 | Eightfinals | 9th place | | | | | | | |
| (China) 1999 | Didn't Qualify | | | | | | | | |
| (Hungary) 2001 | Didn't Qualify | | | | | | | | |
| (North Macedonia) 2003 | Didn't Qualify | | | | | | | | |
| (Czech Republic) 2005 | First Round | 17th place | 8 | 3 | 0 | 5 | 192 | 186 | +6 |
| (North Macedonia) 2008 | Quarterfinals | 7th place | 8 | 5 | 1 | 2 | 224 | 217 | +7 |
| (South Korea) 2010 | Eightfinals | 13th place | 7 | 4 | 1 | 2 | 209 | 164 | +45 |
| (Czech Republic) 2012 | Final | 2nd place | 9 | 6 | 1 | 2 | 235 | 194 | +41 |
| (Croatia) 2014 | Quarterfinals | 5th place | 9 | 7 | 0 | 2 | 250 | 203 | +32 |
| (Russia) 2016 | Eightfinals | 13th place | 7 | 3 | 1 | 3 | 190 | 181 | +9 |
| (Hungary) 2018 | Quarterfinals | 7th place | 9 | 7 | 0 | 2 | 237 | 203 | +34 |
| (Slovenia) 2022 | Eightfinals | 13th place | 7 | 4 | 2 | 1 | 210 | 154 | +56 |
| (North Macedonia) 2024 | Final | Champions | 8 | 8 | 0 | 0 | 254 | 138 | +116 |
| (China) 2026 | Semifinals | 3rd place | | | | | | | |
| Total | 19/22 | 1 Title | | | | | | | |

=== European Championship ===
Champions Runners up Third place Fourth place

European Junior Championship record
| Year | Round | Position | GP | W | D | L | GS | GA | GD |
|---|---|---|---|---|---|---|---|---|---|
| (Poland) 1996 | | 5th place | | | | | | | |
| (Slovakia) 1998 | | 8th place | | | | | | | |
| (France) 2000 | | 11th place | | | | | | | |
| (Finland) 2002 | | 5th place | | | | | | | |
| (Czech Republic) 2004 | | 10th place | | | | | | | |
| (Turkey) 2007 | | 5th place | | | | | | | |
| (Hungary) 2009 | | 5th place | | | | | | | |
| (Netherlands) 2011 | | 10th place | 7 | 3 | 0 | 4 | 184 | 179 | +5 |
| (Denmark) 2013 | | 7th place | | | | | | | |
| (Spain) 2015 | | 9th place | | | | | | | |
| (Slovenia) 2017 | Final | Champions | 7 | 6 | 0 | 1 | 202 | 171 | +31 |
| (Hungary) 2019 | | 8th place | 7 | 3 | 0 | 4 | 186 | 182 | +4 |
| (Slovenia) 2021 | Semi final | 3rd place | 7 | 5 | 0 | 2 | 182 | 160 | +22 |
| (Romania) 2023 | | 6th place | 7 | 3 | 0 | 4 | 218 | 195 | +23 |
| (Montenegro) 2025 | | 5th place | 9 | 8 | 0 | 1 | 256 | 200 | +56 |
| Total | 15/15 | 1 Title | | | | | | | |

== Winner rosters ==
=== 2024 roster ===
Goalkeepers

- Alix Tignon (Pessac, D2)
- Romane Le Huault-Parc (Brest Bretagne HB reserve team, N1)
- Zazie Samzun (OGC Nice)

Left Wingers

- Nina Dury (JDA Dijon, captain)
- Louane Texier (Mérignac HB, also center back)
- Séphora Genyah (Stella Saint-Maur HB)

Right Wingers

- Manon Errard (Metz HB reserve team, N1)
- Emma Tuccella (Metz HB senior+reserve team (N1))

Line players

- Clémence Nkindanda (Chambray HB reserve team, N1)
- Lilou Pintat (JDA Dijon)

Left Backs

- Enola Borg (Pessac, D2))
- Assa Sissoko Dabo (Mérignac HB)

Centre Backs

- Nina Perret (JDA Dijon reserve (N1)+senior team, also back player)

Right Backs

- Lina Colinot (Mérignac HB)
- Alice Monteillet (JDA Dijon reserve team, N1)
- Eva Mbata (Noisy-le-Grand HB, D2)

Back Players

- Fatou Karamoko (Stella Saint-Maur HB, also Line Player)
- Lylou Borg (Mérignac HB, also Centre Back)

Éric Baradat as head coach

=== 2017 roster ===
Goalkeepers

- Camille Depuiset
- Roxanne Frank
- Manuella Dos Reis
- Ophélie Tonds

Left Wingers

- Constance Mauny

Right Wingers

- Melvine Deba

Line players

- Marie Fall
- Mabana-Ma Fofana

Left Backs

- Lisa Bruni
- Charlotte Kieffer
- Claire Vautier
- Déborah Lassource

Centre Backs

- Méline Nocandy
- Pauline Plotton
- Soukeïna Sagna

Right Backs

- Jannela Blonbou
- Karichma Ekoh

Éric Baradat as head coach

== Individual awards ==
=== 2024 ===
All-Star Team / Awards:

- Right wing: Manon Errard
- Line player: Lilou Pintat
- MVP: Lylou Borg

=== 2023 ===
All-Star Team / Awards:

- Best defense player: Fatou Karamoko

=== 2017 ===
All-Star Team / Awards:

- Right back: Jannela Blonbou
- Best defense player: Charlotte Kieffer
