= Germany women's national junior handball team =

Germany

Information
- Association: German Handball Association
- Coach: Christopher Nordmeyer

Colours
1st	2nd

Results

IHF U-20 World Championship
- Appearances: 20 (First in 1977)
- Best result: (gold) Champions (2008, 2026)

European Junior Championship
- Appearances: 14 (First in 1996)
- Best result: (gold) Champions (2025)
- Last updated on Unknown.

The Germany women's junior national handball team is the national under-19 handball team of Germany. Controlled by the German Handball Association it represents the country in international matches.

== Results ==
=== World Championship ===
Champions Runners up Third place Fourth place

IHF Junior World Championship record
Year	Round	Position	GP	W	D	L	GS	GA	GD
West Germany from the year 1977 to 1989
(Romania) 1977	Group stage	11th place	5	2	2	1	65	63	+2
(Socialist Federal Republic of Yugoslavia) 1979		9th place							
(Canada) 1981		Third place							
(France) 1983		12th place							
(South Korea) 1985		9th place							
(Denmark) 1987		12th place							
(Nigeria) 1989		11th place							
Germany To Present
(France) 1991		6th place							
(Bulgaria) 1993		10th place							
(Brazil) 1995		7th place							
(Ivory Coast) 1997	Didn't Qualify								
(China) 1999	Didn't Qualify								
(Hungary) 2001	Semifinals	Third place							
(North Macedonia) 2003	Quarterfinals	5th place							
(Czech Republic) 2005	Didn't Qualify								
(North Macedonia) 2008	Final	Champions	9	6	0	3	268	230	+38
(South Korea) 2010	Quarterfinals	7th place	9	5	1	3	254	232	+21
(Czech Republic) 2012	Didn't Qualify								
(Croatia) 2014	Semifinals	4th place	9	6	0	3	236	204	+32
(Russia) 2016	Semifinals	4th place	9	6	1	2	275	219	+46
(Hungary) 2018	Round of 16	13th place	7	3	0	4	191	157	+44
(Slovenia) 2022	Quarterfinals	7th place	8	5	0	3	242	201	+41
(North Macedonia) 2024	Main round	9th place	7	3	0	2	230	175	+55
(North Macedonia) 2026	Final	Champions	8	8	0	0	283	193	+90
Total	20/24	1 Title							

- West Germany represent its inheritor between 1977 – 1989

=== European Championship ===
Champions Runners up Third place Fourth place

European Junior Championship record
Year	Round	Position	GP	W	D	L	GS	GA	GD
(Poland) 1996		10th place							
(Slovakia) 1998	Didn't Qualify								
(France) 2000		7th place							
(Finland) 2002		11th place							
(Czech Republic) 2004		7th place							
(Turkey) 2007		9th place							
(Hungary) 2009		4th place							
(Netherlands) 2011		11th place							
(Denmark) 2013		10th place							
(Spain) 2015		5th place							
(Slovenia) 2017		4th place							
(Hungary) 2019		9th place							
(Slovenia) 2021		8th place							
(Romania) 2023		11th place							
(Montenegro) 2025		Champions							
Total	14/15	1 Titles							
