= Serbia women's national junior handball team =

Serbia

Information
- Association: Serbian Handball Federation
- Coach: Zoran Barbulović

Colours
1st	2nd

Results

IHF U-20 World Championship
- Appearances: 5 (First in 2010)
- Best result: 4th (2012)
- Last updated on Unknown.

The Serbia women's junior national handball team is the national under-19 handball team of Serbia. Controlled by the Serbian Handball Federation it represents the country in international matches.

== World Championship record ==
- 2010 – 9th place
- 2012 – 4th place
- 2014 – 12th place
- 2024 – 22nd place
- 2026 – 6th place

== European Championship record ==
- 2007 - 10th place
- 2009 - 11th place
- 2011 - 4th place
- 2015 - 11th place
- 2017 - 14th place
- 2023 - 14th place
- 2023 - 14th place
- 2025 - 12th place
