= 1987 Women's Junior World Handball Championship =

1987 Junior World Championship
Tournament details
- Host country: Denmark
- Dates: October 23–November 1
- Teams: 15 (from 3 confederations)

Final positions
- Champions: Soviet Union (5th title)
- Runner-up: Denmark
- Third place: East Germany
- Fourth place: South Korea

Tournament statistics
- Matches played: 48
- Goals scored: 1,868 (38.92 per match)

The 1987 Women's Junior World Handball Championship was the sixth edition of the tournament which took place in Denmark from 23 October to 1 November 1987.

Fifteen teams competed in the competition from three continents with Nigeria being the only country to debut in the tournament. For the second time in a row, a team had to withdraw before the tournament with Argentina withdrawing to lower the number of teams to fifteen. The Soviet Union took home their fifth gold medal in the final and their third in a row after defeating host nation Denmark by nine goals in the final. East Germany finished in third after defeating South Korea.

== First round ==
=== Group A ===
Team	Pld	W	D	L	GF	GA	GD	Pts
Denmark	2	2	0	0	35	30	+5	4
South Korea	2	1	0	1	48	35	+13	2
West Germany	2	0	0	2	24	42	−18	0
Argentina (W)	0	0	0	0	0	0	0	0

(W) Withdrew

October 1987	Denmark	21–20	South Korea	Denmark

October 1987	Denmark	14–10	West Germany	Denmark

October 1987	South Korea	28–14	West Germany	Denmark

=== Group B ===
Team	Pld	W	D	L	GF	GA	GD	Pts
Norway	3	2	0	1	48	45	+3	4
Czechoslovakia	3	2	0	1	50	49	+1	4
France	3	1	0	2	51	51	0	2
Poland	3	1	0	2	51	55	−4	2

October 1987	Czechoslovakia	16–14	Norway	Denmark

October 1987	France	20–18	Poland	Denmark

October 1987	Poland	19–17	Czechoslovakia	Denmark

October 1987	Norway	16–15	France	Denmark

October 1987	Czechoslovakia	17–16	France	Denmark

October 1987	Norway	18–14	Poland	Denmark

=== Group C ===
Team	Pld	W	D	L	GF	GA	GD	Pts
East Germany	3	3	0	0	78	52	+26	6
China	3	2	0	1	70	52	+18	4
Sweden	3	1	0	2	59	65	−6	2
Japan	3	0	0	3	52	90	−38	0

October 1987	China	32–16	Japan	Denmark

October 1987	East Germany	25–18	Sweden	Denmark

October 1987	East Germany	33–15	Japan	Denmark

October 1987	China	19–16	Sweden	Denmark

October 1987	Sweden	25–21	Japan	Denmark

October 1987	East Germany	20–19	China	Denmark

=== Group D ===
Team	Pld	W	D	L	GF	GA	GD	Pts
Soviet Union	3	3	0	0	86	39	+47	6
Yugoslavia	3	2	0	1	64	62	+2	4
Spain	3	1	0	2	45	58	−13	2
Nigeria	3	0	0	3	43	79	−36	0

October 1987	Yugoslavia	27–16	Nigeria	Denmark

October 1987	Soviet Union	23–10	Spain	Denmark

October 1987	Soviet Union	35–13	Nigeria	Denmark

October 1987	Yugoslavia	21–18	Spain	Denmark

October 1987	Spain	17–14	Nigeria	Denmark

October 1987	Soviet Union	28–16	Yugoslavia	Denmark

== Second round ==
=== Group I ===
Team	Pld	W	D	L	GF	GA	GD	Pts
Denmark	5	4	0	1	97	82	+15	8
South Korea	5	3	0	2	118	92	+26	6
Czechoslovakia	5	3	0	2	93	91	+2	6
Norway	5	3	0	2	81	86	−5	6
France	5	2	0	3	82	87	−5	4
West Germany	5	0	0	5	62	95	−33	0

October 1987	South Korea	25–18	Czechoslovakia	Denmark

October 1987	Norway	15–13	West Germany	Denmark

October 1987	France	18–17	Denmark	Denmark

October 1987	Denmark	23–19	Czechoslovakia	Denmark

October 1987	France	15–12	West Germany	Denmark

October 1987	Norway	21–20	South Korea	Denmark

October 1987	Denmark	22–15	Norway	Denmark

October 1987	Czechoslovakia	23–13	West Germany	Denmark

October 1987	South Korea	25–18	France	Denmark

=== Group II ===
Team	Pld	W	D	L	GF	GA	GD	Pts
Soviet Union	5	5	0	0	125	67	+58	10
East Germany	5	4	0	1	99	89	+10	8
Yugoslavia	5	2	1	2	92	104	−12	5
China	5	1	1	3	93	114	−21	3
Sweden	5	1	0	4	93	98	−5	2
Spain	5	1	0	4	83	113	−30	2

October 1987	Yugoslavia	20–20	China	Denmark

October 1987	Soviet Union	23–16	Sweden	Denmark

October 1987	East Germany	21–17	Spain	Denmark

October 1987	East Germany	22–18	Yugoslavia	Denmark

October 1987	Sweden	27–14	Spain	Denmark

October 1987	Soviet Union	34–14	China	Denmark

October 1987	Soviet Union	17–11	East Germany	Denmark

October 1987	Yugoslavia	17–16	Sweden	Denmark

October 1987	Spain	24–21	China	Denmark

=== Thirteenth place ===
Team	Pld	W	D	L	GF	GA	GD	Pts
Poland	2	2	0	0	60	42	+18	4
Nigeria	2	1	0	1	45	53	−8	2
Japan	2	0	0	2	46	56	−10	0

October 1987	Nigeria	26–23	Japan	Denmark

October 1987	Poland	30–19	Nigeria	Denmark

October 1987	Poland	30–23	Japan	Denmark

== Placement matches ==
=== Eleventh place game ===
1987	Spain	16–15	West Germany	Denmark

=== Ninth place game ===
1987	France	22–17	Sweden	Denmark

=== Seventh place game ===
1987	China	20–16	Norway	Denmark

=== Fifth place game ===
1987	Yugoslavia	19–15	Czechoslovakia	Denmark

=== Third place game ===
1 November 1987	East Germany	27–23	South Korea	Denmark

=== Final ===
1 November 1987	Soviet Union	24–15	Denmark	Denmark

== Ranking ==
The final rankings from the 1987 edition:

Rank	Team
Gold medal	Soviet Union
Silver medal	Denmark
Bronze medal	East Germany
4	South Korea
5	Yugoslavia
6	Czechoslovakia
7	China
8	Norway
9	France
10	Spain
11	Sweden
12	West Germany
13	Poland
14	Nigeria
15	Japan
