= Faroe Islands women's national junior handball team =

Faroe Islands

Information
- Association: Handball Federation of the Faroe Islands
- Coach: Helgi Hoydal

Colours
1st	2nd

Results

IHF U-20 World Championship
- Appearances: 1 (First in 2026)
- Best result: 23rd (2026)
- Last updated on Unknown.

The Faroe Islands women's junior national handball team is the national under-19 handball team of Faroe Islands. Controlled by the Handball Federation of the Faroe Islands it represents the country in international matches.

== World Championship record ==
- 2026 – 23rd place
