= 1985 Women's Junior World Handball Championship =

1985 Junior World Championship
Tournament details
- Host country: South Korea
- Dates: October 19–30
- Teams: 15 (from 2 confederations)

Final positions
- Champions: Soviet Union (4th title)
- Runner-up: South Korea
- Third place: Poland
- Fourth place: East Germany

Tournament statistics
- Matches played: 48

The 1985 Women's Junior World Handball Championship was the fifth edition of the tournament which took place in South Korea from 19 to 30 October 1985.

Fifteen teams competed in the competition from three continents with only Spain debuting in the competition. Ivory Coast was meant to compete in the competition but had to withdraw. The gold medal went to the defending champions in the Soviet Union who claimed their fourth title after defeating South Korea by three goals in the final. Poland finished in third after defeating East Germany in second overtime.

== First round ==
=== Group A ===
Team	Pld	W	D	L	GF	GA	GD	Pts
Poland	2	2	0	0	45	37	+8	4
Yugoslavia	2	1	0	1	43	39	+4	2
Japan	2	0	0	2	35	47	−12	0
Ivory Coast (W)	0	0	0	0	0	0	0	0

(W) Withdrew

October 1985	Poland	23–18	Japan	South Korea
October 1985		(8–9)		South Korea

October 1985	Yugoslavia	24–17	Japan	South Korea
October 1985		(9–6)		South Korea

October 1985	Poland	22–19	Yugoslavia	South Korea
October 1985		(8–8)		South Korea

=== Group B ===
Team	Pld	W	D	L	GF	GA	GD	Pts
South Korea	3	3	0	0	90	39	+51	6
China	3	2	0	1	65	49	+16	4
France	3	1	0	2	40	55	−15	2
Spain	3	0	0	3	30	82	−52	0

October 1985	South Korea	27–18	China	South Korea
October 1985		(15–8)		South Korea

October 1985	France	15–12	Spain	South Korea
October 1985		(6–6)		South Korea

October 1985	South Korea	40–11	Spain	South Korea
October 1985		(18–5)		South Korea

October 1985	China	20–15	France	South Korea
October 1985		(8–3)		South Korea

October 1985	South Korea	23–10	France	South Korea
October 1985		(12–5)		South Korea

October 1985	China	27–7	Spain	South Korea
October 1985		(12–4)		South Korea

=== Group C ===
Team	Pld	W	D	L	GF	GA	GD	Pts
Soviet Union	3	3	0	0	93	49	+44	6
Romania	3	2	0	1	58	56	+2	4
Norway	3	1	0	2	58	63	−5	2
Netherlands	3	0	0	3	36	77	−41	0

October 1985	Soviet Union	39–9	Netherlands	South Korea

October 19	Romania	23–15	Norway	South Korea
October 19		(11–6)		South Korea

October 21	Soviet Union	28–19	Romania	South Korea
October 21		(11–9)		South Korea

October 1985	Norway	22–14	Netherlands	South Korea
October 1985		(10–5)		South Korea

October 1985	Soviet Union	26–21	Norway	South Korea
October 1985		(13–12)		South Korea

October 23	Romania	16–13	Netherlands	South Korea
October 23		(10–6)		South Korea

=== Group D ===
Team	Pld	W	D	L	GF	GA	GD	Pts
East Germany	3	3	0	0	56	39	+17	6
West Germany	3	2	0	1	53	38	+15	4
Denmark	3	1	0	2	51	45	+6	2
Austria	3	0	0	3	34	72	−38	0

October 1985	East Germany	19–14	West Germany	South Korea
October 1985		(9–5)		South Korea

October 1985	Denmark	26–15	Austria	South Korea
October 1985		(10–6)		South Korea

October 1985	East Germany	22–11	Austria	South Korea
October 1985		(9–3)		South Korea

October 1985	West Germany	15–11	Denmark	South Korea
October 1985		(5–2)		South Korea

October 1985	East Germany	15–14	Denmark	South Korea
October 1985		(9–7)		South Korea

October 1985	West Germany	24–8	Austria	South Korea
October 1985		(5–3)		South Korea

== Second round ==
=== Group I ===
Team	Pld	W	D	L	GF	GA	GD	Pts
South Korea	5	5	0	0	139	77	+62	10
Poland	5	4	0	1	111	95	+16	8
China	5	3	0	2	120	118	+2	6
Yugoslavia	5	2	0	3	110	124	−14	4
France	5	1	0	4	71	110	−39	2
Japan	5	0	0	5	94	121	−27	0

October 1985	China	37–26	Yugoslavia	South Korea
October 1985		(18–13)		South Korea

October 1985	Poland	24–11	France	South Korea
October 1985		(11–6)		South Korea

October 1985	South Korea	28–17	Japan	South Korea
October 1985		(12–4)		South Korea

October 1985	France	20–19	Japan	South Korea
October 1985		(10–11)		South Korea

October 1985	Poland	27–19	China	South Korea
October 1985		(16–8)		South Korea

October 1985	South Korea	33–17	Yugoslavia	South Korea
October 1985		(16–8)		South Korea

October 1985	Yugoslavia	24–15	France	South Korea
October 1985		(11–7)		South Korea

October 1985	China	26–23	Japan	South Korea
October 1985		(15–10)		South Korea

October 1985	South Korea	28–15	Poland	South Korea
October 1985		(12–8)		South Korea

=== Group II ===
Team	Pld	W	D	L	GF	GA	GD	Pts
Soviet Union	5	5	0	0	123	84	+39	10
East Germany	5	3	0	2	87	87	0	6
Norway	5	3	0	2	110	104	+6	6
Romania	5	2	1	2	107	105	+2	5
West Germany	5	1	0	4	74	95	−21	2
Denmark	5	0	1	4	88	114	−26	1

October 26	Romania	25–20	West Germany	South Korea
October 26		(11–8)		South Korea

October 1985	Soviet Union	28–19	Denmark	South Korea
October 1985		(14–6)		South Korea

October 1985	Norway	25–19	East Germany	South Korea
October 1985		(12–8)		South Korea

October 1985	Norway	32–20	Denmark	South Korea
October 1985		(18–12)		South Korea

October 1985	Soviet Union	23–9	West Germany	South Korea
October 1985		(11–6)		South Korea

October 27	East Germany	18–16	Romania	South Korea
October 27		(12–6)		South Korea

October 29	Romania	24–24	Denmark	South Korea
October 29		(12–14)		South Korea

October 1985	Soviet Union	18–16	East Germany	South Korea
October 1985		(12–6)		South Korea

October 1985	Norway	17–16	West Germany	South Korea
October 1985		(8–6)		South Korea

=== Thirteenth place ===
Team	Pld	W	D	L	GF	GA	GD	Pts
Netherlands	2	2	0	0	39	23	+16	4
Austria	2	1	0	1	29	31	−2	2
Spain	2	0	0	2	20	34	−14	0

October 1985	Austria	16–10	Spain	South Korea
October 1985		(9–7)		South Korea

October 1985	Netherlands	18–10	Spain	South Korea
October 1985		(10–4)		South Korea

October 1985	Netherlands	21–13	Austria	South Korea
October 1985		(8–7)		South Korea

== Placement matches ==
=== Eleventh place game ===
October 1985	Denmark	22–19	Japan	South Korea
October 1985		(11–10)		South Korea

=== Ninth place game ===
October 1985
West Germany
25–22 (ET)
France
South Korea

(11–9)

FT: 19–19 ET: 6–3

=== Seventh place game ===
October 30	Romania	20–15	Yugoslavia	South Korea
October 30		(13–4)		South Korea

=== Fifth place game ===
October 1985	Norway	35–27	China	South Korea
October 1985		(19–13)		South Korea

=== Third place game ===
October 1985
Poland
30–29 (ET)
East Germany
South Korea

(10–15)

FT: 22–22 ET: 5–5, 3–2

=== Final ===
October 30	Soviet Union	27–24	South Korea	South Korea
October 30		(9–16)		South Korea

== Ranking ==
The final rankings from the 1985 edition:

Rank	Team
Gold medal	Soviet Union
Silver medal	South Korea
Bronze medal	Poland
4	East Germany
5	Norway
6	China
7	Romania
8	Yugoslavia
9	West Germany
10	France
11	Denmark
12	Japan
13	Netherlands
14	Austria
15	Spain
