= Austria women's national junior handball team =

Austria

Information
- Association: Austrian Handball Federation
- Coach: Miro Barisic

Colours
1st	2nd

Results

IHF U-20 World Championship
- Appearances: 10 (First in 1977)
- Best result: 11th (1979, 1993, 2012)
- Last updated on Unknown.

The Austria women's junior national handball team is the national under-19 handball team of Austria. Controlled by the Austrian Handball Federation it represents the country in international matches.

== World Championship record ==
- 1977 – 14th place
- 1979 – 11th place
- 1985 – 14th place
- 1989 – 14th place
- 1991 – 14th place
- 1993 – 11th place
- 2012 – 11th place
- 2016 – 19th place
- 2022 – 24th place
- 2026 – 15th place
