= Poland women's national junior handball team =

Poland

Information
- Association: Polish Handball Association
- Coach: Marek Jagodziński

Colours
1st	2nd

Results

IHF U-20 World Championship
- Appearances: 10 (First in 1977)
- Best result: 3rd (1985)
- Last updated on Unknown.

The Poland women's junior national handball team is the national under-19 handball team of Poland. Controlled by the Polish Handball Association it represents the country in international matches.

== World Championship record ==
- 1977 – 5th place
- 1983 – 7th place
- 1985 – 3rd place
- 1987 – 13th place
- 1993 – 8th place
- 2003 – 13th place
- 2005 – 8th place
- 2012 – 7th place
- 2022 – 17th place
- 2026 – 10th place
