= 1983 Women's Junior World Handball Championship =

1983 Junior World Championship
Tournament details
- Host country: France
- Dates: October 14–22
- Teams: 16 (from 3 confederations)

Final positions
- Champions: Soviet Union (3rd title)
- Runner-up: East Germany
- Third place: South Korea
- Fourth place: Yugoslavia

Tournament statistics
- Matches played: 48
- Goals scored: 1,959 (40.81 per match)

The 1983 Women's Junior World Handball Championship was the fourth edition of the tournament which took place in France from 14 to 22 October 1983.

Sixteen teams competed in the competition from three continents with three nations debuting in the competition. The gold medal went to the Soviet Union who claimed their third title after defeating East Germany by five goals in the final. South Korea finished in third after defeating Yugoslavia.

== Group stage ==
=== Group A ===
Team	Pld	W	D	L	GF	GA	GD	Pts
Poland	3	2	0	1	60	52	+8	4
Sweden	3	2	0	1	59	53	+6	4
Denmark	3	2	0	1	53	53	0	4
West Germany	3	0	0	3	36	50	−14	0

Source: Official IHF report

October 14	Poland	16–11	West Germany	France
October 14		(8–4)		France

October 14	Denmark	19–18	Sweden	France
October 14		(12–10)		France

October 15	Sweden	21–16	West Germany	France
October 15		(9–9)		France

October 15	Poland	26–21	Denmark	France
October 15		(14–10)		France

October 16	Denmark	13–9	West Germany	France
October 16		(9–5)		France

October 16	Sweden	20–18	Poland	France
October 16		(10–7)		France

=== Group B ===
Team	Pld	W	D	L	GF	GA	GD	Pts
South Korea	3	2	0	1	76	55	+21	4
East Germany	3	2	0	1	71	56	+15	4
China	3	1	1	1	66	72	−6	3
Japan	3	0	1	2	64	94	−30	1

Source: Official IHF report

October 14	East Germany	14–13	South Korea	France
October 14		(9–8)		France

October 14	China	23–23	Japan	France
October 14		(10–14)		France

October 15	South Korea	39–25	Japan	France
October 15		(23–12)		France

October 15	China	27–25	East Germany	France
October 15		(14–11)		France

October 16	South Korea	24–16	China	France
October 16		(15–8)		France

October 16	East Germany	32–16	Japan	France
October 16		(16–8)		France

=== Group C ===
Team	Pld	W	D	L	GF	GA	GD	Pts
Soviet Union	3	3	0	0	89	35	+54	6
France	3	2	0	1	50	42	+8	4
Ivory Coast	3	1	0	2	48	69	−21	2
Italy	3	0	0	3	33	74	−41	0

Source: Official IHF report

October 14	Soviet Union	31–9	Italy	France
October 14		(14–4)		France

October 14	France	20–9	Ivory Coast	France
October 14		(10–1)		France

October 15	Soviet Union	35–15	Ivory Coast	France
October 15		(16–7)		France

October 15	France	19–10	Italy	France
October 15		(9–6)		France

October 16	Ivory Coast	24–14	Italy	France
October 16		(13–8)		France

October 16	Soviet Union	23–11	France	France
October 16		(10–6)		France

=== Group D ===
Team	Pld	W	D	L	GF	GA	GD	Pts
Yugoslavia	3	3	0	0	83	55	+28	6
Bulgaria	3	1	1	1	65	66	−1	3
Norway	3	1	0	2	50	65	−15	2
Netherlands	3	0	1	2	55	67	−12	1

Source: Official IHF report

October 14	Yugoslavia	29–15	Norway	France
October 14		(16–6)		France

October 14	Bulgaria	22–22	Netherlands	France
October 14		(9–8)		France

October 15	Yugoslavia	27–22	Bulgaria	France
October 15		(14–7)		France

October 15	Norway	18–15	Netherlands	France
October 15		(10–7)		France

October 16	Yugoslavia	27–18	Netherlands	France
October 16		(15–11)		France

October 16	Bulgaria	21–17	Norway	France
October 16		(12–8)		France

== Second round ==
=== Group I ===
Team	Pld	W	D	L	GF	GA	GD	Pts
East Germany	3	3	0	0	65	49	+16	6
South Korea	3	2	0	1	64	57	+7	4
Sweden	3	1	0	2	57	70	−13	2
Poland	3	0	0	3	60	70	−10	0

Source: Official IHF report

October 18	East Germany	23–20	Poland	France
October 18		(9–7)		France

October 18	South Korea	24–21	Sweden	France
October 18		(14–9)		France

October 19	South Korea	27–22	Poland	France
October 19		(13–11)		France

October 19	East Germany	28–16	Sweden	France
October 19		(12–6)		France

=== Group II ===
Team	Pld	W	D	L	GF	GA	GD	Pts
Soviet Union	3	3	0	0	59	37	+22	6
Yugoslavia	3	2	0	1	69	60	+9	4
Bulgaria	3	1	0	2	52	59	−7	2
France	3	0	0	3	45	69	−24	0

Source: Official IHF report

October 18	Soviet Union	19–11	Bulgaria	France
October 18		(10–6)		France

October 18	Yugoslavia	27–21	France	France
October 18		(14–9)		France

October 19	Soviet Union	17–15	Yugoslavia	France
October 19		(7–5)		France

October 19	Bulgaria	19–13	France	France
October 19		(10–7)		France

== Placement round ==
=== Group III ===
Team	Pld	W	D	L	GF	GA	GD	Pts
Denmark	3	3	0	0	60	47	+13	6
West Germany	3	1	1	1	58	55	+3	3
China	3	0	2	1	70	74	−4	2
Japan	3	0	1	2	56	68	−12	1

Source: Official IHF report

October 18	Denmark	23–18	Japan	France
October 18		(12–7)		France

October 18	West Germany	27–27	China	France
October 18		(16–11)		France

October 19	Denmark	24–20	China	France
October 19		(13–11)		France

October 19	West Germany	22–15	Japan	France
October 19		(13–6)		France

=== Group IV ===
Team	Pld	W	D	L	GF	GA	GD	Pts
Norway	3	3	0	0	80	42	+38	6
Netherlands	3	2	0	1	49	47	+2	4
Ivory Coast	3	1	0	2	52	61	−9	2
Italy	3	0	0	3	42	73	−31	0

Source: Official IHF report

October 18	Netherlands	21–17	Ivory Coast	France
October 18		(11–10)		France

October 18	Norway	36–16	Italy	France
October 18		(16–10)		France

October 19	Norway	26–11	Ivory Coast	France
October 19		(13–5)		France

October 19	Netherlands	13–12	Italy	France
October 19		(5–7)		France

== Placement matches ==
=== Fifteen place game ===
October 21	Japan	34–14	Italy	France
October 21		(19–6)		France

=== Thirteenth place game ===
October 1983	China	26–23	Ivory Coast	France
October 1983		(13–11)		France

=== Eleventh place game ===
October 1983	Netherlands	15–14	West Germany	France
October 1983		(6–5)		France

=== Ninth place game ===
October 1983	Norway	21–17	Denmark	France
October 1983		(12–9)		France

=== Seventh place game ===
October 1983	Poland	24–20	France	France
October 1983		(13–9)		France

=== Fifth place game ===
October 1983	Bulgaria	29–15	Sweden	France
October 1983		(14–8)		France

=== Third place game ===
October 1983	South Korea	26–23	Yugoslavia	France
October 1983		(15–9)		France

=== Final ===
October 22	Soviet Union	22–17	East Germany	France
October 22		(10–11)		France

== Ranking ==
The final rankings from the 1983 edition:

Rank	Team
Gold medal	Soviet Union
Silver medal	East Germany
Bronze medal	South Korea
4	Yugoslavia
5	Bulgaria
6	Sweden
7	Poland
8	France
9	Norway
10	Denmark
11	Netherlands
12	West Germany
13	China
14	Ivory Coast
15	Japan
16	Italy
