= Romania women's national junior handball team =

Romania

Information
- Association: Romanian Handball Federation
- Coach: Constantin-Alin Oprescu

Colours
1st	2nd

Results

IHF U-20 World Championship
- Appearances: 17 (First in 1977)
- Best result: (gold) Champions(1995, 1999)

European Junior Championship
- Appearances: 12 (First in 1996)
- Best result: (gold) Champions(1998, 2000)
- Last updated on Unknown.

The Romania women's junior national handball team is the national under-19 handball team of Romania. Controlled by the Romanian Handball Federation it represents the country in international matches.

== World Championship results ==
- 1977 – 3rd place
- 1985 – 7th place
- 1991 – 5th place
- 1993 – 5th place
- 1995 – 1st place
- 1997 – 3rd place
- 1999 – 1st place
- 2001 – 5th place
- 2003 – 11th place
- 2008 – 10th place
- 2012 – 13th place
- 2014 – 6th place
- 2016 – 3rd place
- 2018 – 8th place
- 2022 – 18th place
- 2024 – 11th place
- 2026 – 11th place
