= Turkey women's national junior handball team =

Turkey

Information
- Association: Turkey Handball Federation
- Coach: David Ginesta Montes

Colours
1st	2nd

Results

IHF U-20 World Championship
- Appearances: 5 (First in 1989)
- Best result: 11th (1997, 1999, 2001)
- Last updated on Unknown.

The Turkey women's junior national handball team is the national under-19 handball team of Turkey. Controlled by the Turkey Handball Federation it represents the country in international matches.

== World Championship record ==
- 1989 – 15th place
- 1997 – 11th place
- 1999 – 11th place
- 2001 – 11th place
- 2026 – 25th place
