= Portugal women's national junior handball team =

Portugal

Information
- Association: Portuguese Handball Federation
- Coach: José Silva

Colours
1st	2nd

Results

IHF U-20 World Championship
- Appearances: 5 (First in 1997)
- Best result: 5th (2024)
- Last updated on Unknown.

The Portugal women's junior national handball team is the national under-19 handball team of Portugal. Controlled by the Portuguese Handball Federation it represents the country in international matches.

== World Championship results ==
- 1997 – 6th place
- 2003 – 10th place
- 2014 – 16th place
- 2018 – 18th place
- 2024 – 5th place
