= Montenegro women's national junior handball team =

Montenegro

Information
- Association: Handball Federation of Montenegro
- Coach: Igor Marković

Colours
1st	2nd

Results

IHF U-20 World Championship
- Appearances: 7 (First in 2008)
- Best result: 3rd place (2010)
- Last updated on Unknown.

The Montenegro women's national under-21 handball team represents Montenegro in international under-21 handball competitions. The current head coach is Nikola Petrović.

== World Championship results ==
- 2008 – 8th place
- 2010 – 3rd place
- 2016 – 17th place
- 2018 – 16th place
- 2022 – 10th place
- 2024 – 12th place
- 2026 – 5th place
