= 2024 IHF Women's U20 Handball World Championship squads =

This article displays the squads for the 2024 IHF Women's U20 Handball World Championship. Each team consisted of a maximum of 18 players.

Age, club, appearances and goals correct as of 19 June 2024.

== Group A ==
=== Brazil ===
A 16-player squad was announced on 24 May 2024.

Head coach: Margarida Conte

No.	Pos.	Name	Date of birth (age)	Height	App.	Goals	Club
1	GK	Manuella Navarro	4 November 2005 (aged 18)	1.79 m	11	0	(Brazil) Esporte Clube Pinheiros
3	RB	Júlia Rodrigues	27 September 2004 (aged 19)	1.67 m	11	36	(France) Saint-Amand Handball
4	P	Kauani Dos Santos	31 December 2005 (aged 18)	1.80 m	0	0	(Brazil) AECB Handebol
5	RW	Serena Borne	17 February 2004 (aged 20)	1.62 m	7	11	(Brazil) Clube Português do Recife
6	P	Gabriella Da Cruz	8 April 2004 (aged 20)	1.82 m	11	17	(Brazil) Associação Desportiva Centro Olímpico
10	LW	Ana Dos Santos	30 January 2004 (aged 20)	1.64 m	11	18	(Brazil) UnC Concórdia
11	LW	Yannka Santos	30 January 2004 (aged 20)	1.70 m	0	0	(Brazil) Associação Desportiva Centro Olímpico
12	GK	Marcela Bacelar	16 February 2004 (aged 20)	1.74 m	0	0	(Brazil) São José Handebol
13	CB	Eduarda Borges	10 January 2005 (aged 19)	1.64 m	11	32	(Brazil) Clube Português do Recife
15	P	Ingrid Barbosa	16 November 2004 (aged 19)	1.80 m	0	0	(Brazil) Clube Português do Recife
16	LW	Maria Da Silva	9 June 2005 (aged 19)	1.50 m	0	0	(Brazil) Clube CESC
19	LB	Nathaly Soares	15 January 2005 (aged 19)	1.70 m	11	32	(Brazil) FME Criciúma/Acrihf
20	LW	Yasmin Ferreira	2 May 2005 (aged 19)	1.63 m	4	6	(Brazil) Esporte Clube Pinheiros
23	P	Lívia Oliveira	8 June 2004 (aged 20)	1.77 m	11	14	(Brazil) Esporte Clube Pinheiros
24	RB	Maria Silva	24 November 2004 (aged 19)	1.60 m	11	20	(Brazil) Clube CESC
77	CB	Lorenna Loyane	11 March 2005 (aged 19)	1.66 m	0	0	(Brazil) Esporte Clube Pinheiros

=== Iran ===
A 16-player squad was announced on 9 June 2024.

Head coach: Nashmin Shafeyan

No.	Pos.	Name	Date of birth (age)	Height	App.	Goals	Club
4	LB	Fatemeh Merikh	6 August 2004 (aged 19)	1.70 m	14	79	(Iran) Sang Ahan Bafgh
7	P	Saba Zangeneh	24 January 2004 (aged 20)	1.70 m	10	25	No club
11	P	Elahe Nikan	20 January 2005 (aged 19)	1.70 m	0	0	(Iran) Sepahan
12	GK	Elnaz Yarmohammadtouski	4 May 2005 (aged 19)	1.70 m	30	0	(Iran) Sepahan
14	RB	Arezoo Bahmaei	28 December 2004 (aged 19)	1.62 m	15	20	(Iran) Naft Gaz Gachsaran
21	RB	Hasti Arianfar	1 January 2008 (aged 16)	1.75 m	0	0	(Iran) Alborz
24	CB	Aseman Badvi	24 February 2007 (aged 17)	1.75 m	10	25	(Iran) Alborz
29	CB	Shahrzad Nosoohi	18 May 2004 (aged 20)	1.72 m	20	15	(Iran) Sepahan
33	GK	Mohaddeseh Shabani	12 September 2006 (aged 17)	1.80 m	0	0	(Iran) Sang Ahan Bafgh
49	RB	Saeideh Ghazanfari	13 November 2004 (aged 19)	1.69 m	0	0	(Iran) Sepahan
72	LW	Zahra Fotovati	6 April 2004 (aged 20)	1.72 m	5	10	(Iran) Zagros
76	LB	Nastaran Koudzarifarahani	10 January 2004 (aged 20)	1.75 m	25	30	(Iran) Zagros
87	LB	Fatemeh Shanin	7 April 2008 (aged 16)	1.77 m	0	0	(Iran) Sepahan
88	LW	Maede Oshaghi	17 June 2004 (aged 20)	1.74 m	20	35	(Iran) Sang Ahan Bafgh
90	LW	Saba Dehghani	26 January 2007 (aged 17)	1.78 m	0	0	(Iran) Sepahan
96	GK	Ghazaleh Mehri	6 March 2008 (aged 16)	1.78 m	0	0	No club

=== Netherlands ===
A 16-player squad was announced on 18 June 2024.

Head coach: Ricardo Clarijs

No.	Pos.	Name	Date of birth (age)	Height	App.	Goals	Club
1	GK	Nikki van der Vorst	20 June 2006 (aged 17)	1.79 m	8	5	(Netherlands) VOC Amsterdam
2	GK	Bianca Schanssema	6 January 2005 (aged 19)	1.90 m	11	0	(Denmark) København Håndbold
3	LW	Lynn van Diepen	11 May 2004 (aged 20)	1.74 m	0	0	(Netherlands) Westfriesland/SEW
5	LB	Judith van der Helm	13 January 2005 (aged 19)	1.82 m	8	20	(Netherlands) VOC Amsterdam
7	LW	Jalisha Loy	6 February 2004 (aged 20)	1.69 m	23	73	(Netherlands) VOC Amsterdam
9	RW	Donna Bakker	6 February 2004 (aged 20)	1.66 m	9	19	(Netherlands) VOC Amsterdam
11	CB	Daphne Luchies	23 May 2004 (aged 20)	1.74 m	4	3	(Netherlands) VOC Amsterdam
12	LW	Loïs van Vliet	15 August 2005 (aged 18)	1.76 m	12	30	(Netherlands) VOC Amsterdam
14	RB	Alieke van Maurik	11 May 2005 (aged 19)	1.81 m	9	36	(Netherlands) VOC Amsterdam
15	CB	Lynn Holtman	7 July 2004 (aged 19)	1.75 m	10	21	(Netherlands) Westfriesland/SEW
21	P	Romée Maarschalkerweerd	24 September 2004 (aged 19)	1.78 m	8	27	(Netherlands) Westfriesland/SEW
23	LB	Rozemarij Alderden	30 March 2004 (aged 20)	1.84 m	8	9	(Netherlands) VOC Amsterdam
24	RB	Maud Horvers	7 March 2006 (aged 18)	1.82 m	0	0	(Netherlands) VOC Amsterdam
28	CB	Lisa Hölscher	20 October 2005 (aged 18)	1.82 m	0	0	(Netherlands) Juro Unirek/VZV
37	P	Fenna Muilenburg	19 October 2004 (aged 19)	1.84 m	0	0	(Germany) TuS Lintfort
38	RB	Paris Scholten	13 October 2004 (aged 19)	1.79 m	0	0	(Netherlands) PCA/Kwiek

=== Romania ===
A 18-player squad was announced on 11 June 2024.

Head coach: Simona Maior-Pașca

No.	Pos.	Name	Date of birth (age)	Height	App.	Goals	Club
1	GK	Teodora Neagu	15 October 2004 (aged 19)	1.70 m	22	0	(Romania) SCM Râmnicu Vâlcea
2	RW	Mihaela Mihai	15 December 2004 (aged 19)	1.78 m	26	34	(Romania) CSM București
3	P	Rebecca Geamanu	12 July 2004 (aged 19)	1.76 m	7	9	(Romania) CS Gloria Bistrița-Năsăud
5	RB	Ana Grigore	29 March 2004 (aged 20)	1.77 m	24	47	(Romania) SCM Râmnicu Vâlcea
8	P	Noemi Mezei	1 December 2004 (aged 19)	1.72 m	16	14	(Romania) CS Gloria Bistrița-Năsăud
12	GK	Ana Cristea	12 October 2004 (aged 19)	1.83 m	23	0	(Romania) HC Dunărea Brăila
15	CB	Sorina Brîndușa	2 January 2004 (aged 20)	1.65 m	8	11	(Romania) CS Minaur Baia Mare
16	GK	Ioana Niță	4 May 2006 (aged 18)	1.82 m	16	0	(Romania) CSM București
21	LB	Irina Maxim	28 November 2005 (aged 18)	1.81 m	2	1	(Romania) CSM București
22	RW	Costinela Raicea	13 March 2005 (aged 19)	1.68 m	9	7	(Romania) HC Dunărea Brăila
24	CB	Alisia Boiciuc	20 July 2005 (aged 18)	1.78 m	36	91	(Romania) CSM Corona Brașov
28	LB	Diana Lixăndroiu	14 August 2005 (aged 18)	1.84 m	42	94	(Romania) HC Dunărea Brăila
51	RW	Elena Drăgoescu	24 March 2005 (aged 19)	1.68 m	14	16	(Romania) CS Dacia Mioveni 2012
55	P	Cristina Danciu	30 July 2004 (aged 19)	1.77 m	17	21	(Romania) CS Minaur Baia Mare
56	LW	Denisa Romaniuc	15 September 2004 (aged 19)	1.66 m	8	23	(Romania) CS Minaur Baia Mare
77	LW	Mariam Mohamed	27 August 2004 (aged 19)	1.71 m	24	51	(Romania) HC Dunărea Brăila
88	CB	Lavinia Florea	1 July 2004 (aged 19)	1.70 m	17	27	(Romania) CSM Iaşi
98	P	Cristina Irimia	21 May 2004 (aged 20)	1.77 m	16	20	(Romania) ACS Sepsi Sic Sf.Gheorghe

== Group B ==
=== Chile ===
A 16-player squad was announced on 15 June 2024.

Head coach: Felipe Barrientos

No.	Pos.	Name	Date of birth (age)	Height	App.	Goals	Club
2	P	Magdalena de la Barra	20 February 2004 (aged 20)	1.62 m	7	15	(Chile) BM Ovalle
3	RW	Catalina Valdivia	25 September 2005 (aged 18)	1.72 m	7	7	(Chile) Italiano BM
4	RB	Constanza Paul	10 December 2005 (aged 18)	1.71 m	7	13	(Chile) Italiano BM
7	LW	Amanda Riquelme	24 August 2005 (aged 18)	1.62 m	0	0	(Chile) BM Ovalle
9	RB	Anaís Larenas	20 May 2007 (aged 17)	1.71 m	0	0	(Chile) BM San Carlos
10	LB	Isidora Valdivieso	10 February 2007 (aged 17)	1.74 m	0	0	(Chile) Italiano BM
11	LB	Renata Lizana	6 June 2006 (aged 18)	1.72 m	0	0	(Chile) BM Ovalle
13	P	Colomba Canessa	10 May 2006 (aged 18)	1.75 m	0	0	(Chile) Italiano BM
14	LW	Antonia Millán	14 March 2006 (aged 18)	1.68 m	0	0	(Chile) Italiano BM
23	P	Noelia Carrasco	2 March 2007 (aged 17)	1.74 m	0	0	(Chile) BM Punta Arenas
25	RW	Antonia Sánchez	22 July 2005 (aged 18)	1.54 m	7	14	(Chile) Deumayen
28	LW	Ignacia Berlinger	26 August 2005 (aged 18)	1.70 m	0	0	(Chile) Italiano BM
30	RW	Michaela Bocchieri	30 September 2005 (aged 18)	1.68 m	3	0	(Spain) BM Pozuelo
33	CB	Renata Campos	8 August 2006 (aged 17)	1.66 m	0	0	(Chile) CUBLA
36	GK	Isabella Gore	30 July 2007 (aged 16)	1.80 m	0	0	(Chile) BM Ovalle
87	GK	Paula Craig	17 January 2005 (aged 19)	1.60 m	13	2	(Brazil) Sorocaba

=== Egypt ===
A 17-player squad was announced on 16 June 2024.

Head coach: Ramy Abdellatif

No.	Pos.	Name	Date of birth (age)	Height	App.	Goals	Club
1	GK	Lubna Ashraf	4 January 2004 (aged 20)	1.73 m	20	0	(Egypt) El Shams SC
2	LW	Mona Sonbol	1 December 2005 (aged 18)	1.75 m	0	0	(Egypt) El Shams SC
4	LB	Sara Ashraf	8 January 2005 (aged 19)	1.76 m	0	0	(Egypt) Smouha SC
5	RB	Nawal Ahmed	12 February 2005 (aged 19)	1.77 m	13	36	(Egypt) Al Ahly SC
8	LW	Mariam Omar	15 January 2004 (aged 20)	1.69 m	40	140	(Egypt) Zamalek SC
9	CB	Shrouk Mahmoud	7 July 2006 (aged 17)	1.74 m	25	39	(Egypt) Al Ahly SC
11	LB	Lojin Osama	17 February 2004 (aged 20)	1.83 m	24	66	(Egypt) Smouha SC
14	RW	Kenzy Hatem	22 March 2004 (aged 20)	1.70 m	24	71	(Egypt) Al Ahly SC
15	LB	Noha Ehab	5 January 2006 (aged 18)	1.77 m	12	30	(Egypt) Al Ahly SC
17	P	Nada Tamer	17 October 2006 (aged 17)	1.80 m	0	0	(Egypt) 6th of October SC
22	LB	Touka Kamel	2 December 2004 (aged 19)	1.77 m	22	36	(Egypt) Al Ahly SC
25	CB	Malak Ahmed	1 February 2004 (aged 20)	1.73 m	40	56	(Egypt) Al Ahly SC
28	CB	Nadein Tarek	18 December 2004 (aged 19)	1.70 m	40	53	(Egypt) Alexandria SC
89	P	Fatma Mahmoud	17 July 2005 (aged 18)	1.71 m	40	29	(Egypt) El Shams SC
96	GK	Sarah Elwy	13 July 2004 (aged 19)	1.69 m	10	0	(Egypt) El Shams SC
98	GK	Gihad Wael	21 February 2006 (aged 18)	1.78 m	20	0	(Egypt) Al Ahly SC
99	RB	Jana Salaeldin	7 March 2004 (aged 20)	1.68 m	40	32	(Egypt) Alexandria SC

=== Switzerland ===
A 16-player squad was announced on 14 June 2024.

Head coach: Manuel Schnellmann

No.	Pos.	Name	Date of birth (age)	Height	App.	Goals	Club
2	RW	Angelina Schläpfer	7 August 2005 (aged 18)	1.66 m	12	4	(Switzerland) GC Amicitia Zürich
4	LW	Leonie Arpagaus	11 September 2004 (aged 19)	1.65 m	2	3	(Switzerland) LC Brühl Handball
6	P	Lynn Schürmann	3 April 2004 (aged 20)	1.81 m	11	4	(Switzerland) LK Zug
7	LB	Claire Coker	21 February 2005 (aged 19)	1.77 m	21	52	(Switzerland) LC Brühl Handball
9	LB	Kim Erni	16 June 2005 (aged 19)	1.83 m	17	10	(Switzerland) GC Amicitia Zürich
10	P	Sara Zaetta	8 January 2004 (aged 20)	1.77 m	9	12	(Switzerland) LK Zug
12	GK	Charlotte Chappuis	19 November 2004 (aged 19)	1.75 m	12	0	(Switzerland) Yellow Winterthur
14	CB	Nuria Bucher	21 March 2005 (aged 19)	1.79 m	16	59	(Switzerland) Spono Eagles
18	CB	Ursina Schnider	27 November 2005 (aged 18)	1.73 m	13	22	(Switzerland) LC Brühl Handball
19	RB	Yara Mosimann	10 May 2004 (aged 20)	1.74 m	13	18	(Switzerland) LC Brühl Handball
21	LW	Alessia Riner	8 January 2004 (aged 20)	1.72 m	17	54	(Germany) Neckarsulmer SU
22	LB	Annika Lauper	14 April 2005 (aged 19)	1.75 m	13	26	(Switzerland) DHB Rotweiss Thun
30	GK	Claire Hartz	2 September 2005 (aged 18)	1.81 m	12	0	(Switzerland) Spono Eagles
33	P	Nora Snedkerud	21 January 2005 (aged 19)	1.80 m	16	34	(Switzerland) Spono Eagles
34	RB	Emma Bächtiger	28 May 2004 (aged 20)	1.77 m	14	3	(Switzerland) LK Zug
39	RW	Sev Albrecht	26 April 2005 (aged 19)	1.68 m	16	37	(Switzerland) HV Herzogenbuchsee

=== Tunisia ===
A 16-player squad was announced on 19 June 2024.

Head coach: Badreddine Haj Sassi

No.	Pos.	Name	Date of birth (age)	Height	App.	Goals	Club
1	GK	Ilef Boubaker	9 October 2004 (aged 19)	1.75 m	0	0	(Tunisia) Association Sportive Féminine de Sayada
4	RB	Loua Dammak	3 March 2004 (aged 20)	1.67 m	0	0	(Tunisia) Espoir sportif de Rejiche
5	LW	Mayssa Ben Hassine	22 March 2005 (aged 19)	1.79 m	6	19	(Tunisia) Association Sportive Féminine de Chebba
7	RW	Houda Rmiza	19 June 2004 (aged 20)	1.58 m	6	29	(Tunisia) Club Africain
9	P	Amal Ben Hassine	23 February 2004 (aged 20)	1.76 m	6	18	(Tunisia) El Menzah Sport
10	CB	Erij Ben Salah	24 June 2004 (aged 19)	1.74 m	6	6	(Tunisia) Club Africain
16	GK	Chahed Ben Moussa	7 April 2004 (aged 20)	1.84 m	14	0	(Tunisia) Club Africain
17	RB	Hadil Ghizaoui	25 September 2004 (aged 19)	1.75 m	6	21	(Tunisia) Association Sportive d'Hammamet
19	LB	Wieme Mghirbi	15 July 2004 (aged 19)	1.80 m	6	5	(Tunisia) Club Africain
20	RW	Nour Dabbabi	6 January 2004 (aged 20)	1.69 m	6	24	(Tunisia) El Menzah Sport
22	LB	Emna Sfaxi	14 October 2004 (aged 19)	1.72 m	11	20	(Tunisia) Flèche Sportive de Ras Jebel
23	RW	Houda Trabelssi	8 February 2004 (aged 20)	1.70 m	6	14	(Tunisia) Étoile Sportive du Sahel
60	P	Nouha Djeribi	14 March 2005 (aged 19)	1.79 m	5	7	(Tunisia) Association Sportive Féminine de Chebba
66	P	Rania Mansour	24 August 2004 (aged 19)	1.75 m	5	10	(Tunisia) Aigle Sportif de Téboulba
76	GK	Aya Boudhaouia	16 February 2006 (aged 18)	1.72 m	10	0	(Tunisia) Association Sportive Féminine de Sayada
77	LW	Mariem Souissi	3 July 2004 (aged 19)	1.70 m	0	0	(Tunisia) Aigle Sportif de Téboulba

== Group C ==
=== Argentina ===
A 17-player squad was announced on 31 May 2024.

Head coach: Hernán Siso

No.	Pos.	Name	Date of birth (age)	Height	App.	Goals	Club
1	GK	Rocío Slaibe	23 July 2004 (aged 19)	1.69 m	9	1	(Argentina) Club Atlético Vélez Sarsfield
2	CB	Ailin Cabaña	15 November 2004 (aged 19)	1.64 m	16	47	(Argentina) CIDECO
3	CB	Martina Layus	18 August 2004 (aged 19)	1.59 m	22	57	(Spain) CB Zonzamas
4	LB	Sofia Gull Querin	3 September 2005 (aged 18)	1.87 m	21	123	(Spain) BM Porriño
5	LB	Martina Tajes	16 January 2004 (aged 20)	1.66 m	16	35	(Argentina) SAG Ballester
7	LW	Paloma Satto	26 April 2004 (aged 20)	1.74 m	5	21	(Argentina) Club Atlético River Plate
8	CB	Miranda Kruk	13 June 2005 (aged 19)	1.73 m	17	45	(Argentina) SEDALO
9	P	Kiara Manzo	4 August 2005 (aged 18)	1.70 m	22	38	(Argentina) CIDECO
10	RB	Azul Spinelli	4 September 2004 (aged 19)	1.72 m	25	58	(Argentina) Dorrego
12	GK	Florencia Carrasco	14 February 2005 (aged 19)	1.68 m	21	0	(Argentina) Ferro Carril Oeste
16	GK	Candelaria Cuadrado	3 July 2004 (aged 19)	1.82 m	31	0	(Argentina) SEDALO
17	P	Zoe Oriolo	17 January 2005 (aged 19)	1.80 m	16	15	(Argentina) Ferro Carril Oeste
19	CB	Candela Remolque	27 May 2004 (aged 20)	1.64 m	0	0	(Argentina) Club Municipality de Vicente López
20	CB	Magali Alfredi	2 December 2004 (aged 19)	1.74 m	5	10	(Argentina) Club Atlético Vélez Sarsfield
22	RW	Iara Caceres	26 April 2004 (aged 20)	1.60 m	16	35	(Argentina) Club Atlético River Plate
23	RW	Valentina Stanich	22 March 2005 (aged 19)	1.74 m	10	18	(Argentina) Jockey Club Córdoba
30	RB	Luciana Martinellli	19 January 2004 (aged 20)	1.63 m	8	20	(Brazil) Esporte Clube Pinheiros

=== Hungary ===
A 18-player squad was announced on 18 June 2024.

Head coach: Zoltán Szilágyi

No.	Pos.	Name	Date of birth (age)	Height	App.	Goals	Club
3	LB	Emília Varga	14 July 2004 (aged 19)	1.85 m	60	4	(Hungary) Mosonmagyaróvári KC SE
5	LB	Luca Csíkos	25 February 2005 (aged 19)	1.80 m	60	5	(Hungary) Váci NKSE
9	GK	Szofi Imre	21 June 2004 (aged 19)	1.78 m	50	8	(Hungary) Érd HC
15	LW	Fanni Török	8 October 2005 (aged 18)	1.67 m	10	3	(Hungary) Ferencvárosi TC
17	LB	Krisztina Panyi	18 May 2004 (aged 20)	1.79 m	50	5	(Hungary) Érd HC
18	CB	Liliána Csernyánszki	25 August 2004 (aged 19)	1.64 m	37	4	(Hungary) Debreceni VSC
19	RW	Tamara Vártok	13 January 2004 (aged 20)	1.69 m	50	3	(Hungary) Moyra-Budaörs Handball
28	GK	Klára Zaj	5 September 2004 (aged 19)	1.77 m	47	13	(Hungary) National Academy of Handball
33	RB	Anikó Kovács	5 February 2004 (aged 20)	1.77 m	25	5	(Hungary) Váci NKSE
34	RW	Léna Gém	5 February 2004 (aged 20)	1.58 m	30	4	(Hungary) Kisvárda Master Good
36	P	Lili Szabó	17 July 2004 (aged 19)	1.79 m	33	3	(Hungary) Kisvárda Master Good
44	CB	Fanni Horváth	29 October 2005 (aged 18)	1.73 m	40	4	(Hungary) Ferencvárosi TC
45	GK	Réka Lakatos	4 March 2005 (aged 19)	1.83 m	7	6	(Hungary) Debreceni VSC
48	LB	Lea Faragó	22 July 2005 (aged 18)	1.75 m	5	2	(Hungary) National Academy of Handball
80	P	Luca Kövér	1 March 2005 (aged 19)	1.79 m	26	2	(Hungary) Alba Fehérvár KC
81	RB	Júlia Farkas	1 August 2004 (aged 19)	1.72 m	50	5	(Hungary) Győri ETO KC
91	P	Petra Gajdos	22 December 2004 (aged 19)	1.74 m	7	8	(Hungary) Dunaújvárosi Kohász KA
99	LW	Anna Szabó	11 June 2004 (aged 20)	1.77 m	50	4	(Hungary) Moyra-Budaörs Handball

=== Mexico ===
A 14-player squad was announced on 19 June 2024.

Head coach: Rogelio Mancilla

No.	Pos.	Name	Date of birth (age)	Height	App.	Goals	Club
2	LW	Mía Cervantes	20 December 2004 (aged 19)	1.60 m	8	0	(Mexico) Nuevo León HC
4	LB	Dahena Paz	10 November 2004 (aged 19)	1.77 m	8	0	(Mexico) Chihuahua
5	LW	Jenifer Verdugo	7 January 2004 (aged 20)	1.67 m	19	55	(Mexico) HC Real
6	LB	Mía Valdez	2 July 2005 (aged 18)	1.56 m	8	0	(Mexico) Tamaulipas HC
7	RB	Mayra Hernández	4 July 2005 (aged 18)	1.78 m	8	0	(Mexico) Chihuahua
8	RW	Cielo Murillo	16 December 2004 (aged 19)	1.60 m	8	0	(Mexico) Jalisco HC
9	P	Victoria González	28 July 2004 (aged 19)	1.77 m	8	0	(Mexico) Chihuahua
10	P	Ximena Campos	2 March 2004 (aged 20)	1.51 m	8	0	(Mexico) Nuevo León HC
12	GK	Andrea de la Cruz	29 November 2005 (aged 18)	1.70 m	13	0	(Mexico) Chihuahua
13	RW	Lilia Alcalá	2 September 2004 (aged 19)	1.65 m	8	0	(Mexico) Nuevo León HC
14	RW	María López	31 October 2005 (aged 18)	1.68 m	8	0	(Mexico) Sonora HC
17	LB	Valeria Virgen	1 June 2004 (aged 20)	1.80 m	18	8	(Mexico) HC Real
24	GK	Karewit Venancio	18 August 2004 (aged 19)	1.77 m	13	0	(Mexico) HC Real
55	LW	Denisse Mata	5 August 2004 (aged 19)	1.61 m	8	0	(Mexico) Chihuahua

=== South Korea ===
A 16-player squad was announced on 2 June 2024.

Head coach: Oh Se-il

No.	Pos.	Name	Date of birth (age)	Height	App.	Goals	Club
4	RB	Lee Hye-won	16 May 2004 (aged 20)	1.68 m	15	42	(South Korea) Powerful Daegu
6	P	Kim Se-jin	6 December 2005 (aged 18)	1.74 m	14	18	(South Korea) Hwangji Information Industry High School
7	CB	Park Su-jeong	14 June 2005 (aged 19)	1.67 m	8	4	(South Korea) Hwikyung Girl's High School
9	LW	Kim Bo-hyun	3 April 2006 (aged 18)	1.62 m	0	0	(South Korea) Chosun University
10	LB	Lim Seo-young	17 August 2005 (aged 18)	1.74 m	8	9	(South Korea) Incheon Business High School
11	LW	Kim Seo-jin	4 December 2005 (aged 18)	1.63 m	8	53	(South Korea) Ilshin Girl's High School
12	GK	Kim Ga-yeong	16 July 2004 (aged 19)	1.77 m	0	0	(South Korea) Korea National Sport University
17	CB	Oh Yea-na	1 May 2004 (aged 20)	1.71 m	8	2	(South Korea) Kyungnam Physical Education High School
18	LB	Kim Jia	3 August 2005 (aged 18)	1.71 m	8	35	(South Korea) Ilshin Girl's High School
21	RB	Jeong Yeon-woo	23 June 2005 (aged 18)	1.61 m	0	0	(South Korea) Kyungnam Physical Education High School
24	RW	Cha Seo-yeon	24 July 2004 (aged 19)	1.62 m	8	32	(South Korea) Incheon Metropolitan City
27	P	Kim Eui-jin	6 December 2004 (aged 19)	1.75 m	0	0	(South Korea) Jeongeup Girl's High School
28	RW	Kim Ji-min	3 February 2005 (aged 19)	1.71 m	0	0	(South Korea) Powerful Daegu
37	GK	You Jung-won	25 October 2005 (aged 18)	1.72 m	0	0	(South Korea) Kyungnam Physical Education High School
72	GK	Park Sa-rang	11 July 2005 (aged 18)	1.74 m	0	0	(South Korea) Wonderful Samcheok
97	CB	Jo Yu-hee	27 October 2005 (aged 18)	1.65 m	0	0	(South Korea) Korea National Sport University

== Group D ==
=== Chinese Taipei ===
A 16-player squad was announced on 19 June 2024.

Head coach: Chia Ling-hui

No.	Pos.	Name	Date of birth (age)	Height	App.	Goals	Club
1	GK	Wu Hsin-yun	6 January 2005 (aged 19)	1.82 m	0	0	(Chinese Taipei) New Taipei
7	CB	Shih Chi-chiao-en	7 February 2005 (aged 19)	1.57 m	0	0	(Chinese Taipei) New Taipei
8	RB	Tien Yun-ju	25 November 2005 (aged 18)	1.60 m	0	0	(Chinese Taipei) New Taipei
10	LB	Chen Yen-chun	11 April 2005 (aged 19)	1.60 m	0	0	(Chinese Taipei) New Taipei
14	LB	Yu Chien-yu	7 September 2007 (aged 16)	1.65 m	0	0	(Chinese Taipei) New Taipei
18	GK	Li Hsin-yi	13 September 2005 (aged 18)	1.70 m	0	0	(Chinese Taipei) New Taipei
19	RB	Yu Chia-ying	1 October 2005 (aged 18)	1.66 m	0	0	(Chinese Taipei) New Taipei
23	LW	Chang Fu-ying	30 November 2006 (aged 17)	1.62 m	0	0	(Chinese Taipei) New Taipei
24	RB	Lien Yi-ling	18 January 2005 (aged 19)	1.61 m	0	0	(Chinese Taipei) New Taipei
28	P	Li Yun-ci	8 April 2004 (aged 20)	1.60 m	0	0	(Chinese Taipei) New Taipei
29	RB	Lin Ching	29 October 2006 (aged 17)	1.62 m	0	0	(Chinese Taipei) New Taipei
36	RW	Chuan Heng-yi	15 September 2006 (aged 17)	1.59 m	0	0	(Chinese Taipei) New Taipei
66	LB	Lee Ying-chi	10 July 2005 (aged 18)	1.63 m	0	0	(Chinese Taipei) New Taipei
77	LB	Hsu Fang-ying	4 December 2006 (aged 17)	1.69 m	0	0	(Chinese Taipei) New Taipei
79	RB	Chang Ya-ting	4 February 2004 (aged 20)	1.63 m	0	0	(Chinese Taipei) New Taipei
88	L	Yang I-chen	15 October 2007 (aged 16)	1.68 m	0	0	(Chinese Taipei) New Taipei

=== Denmark ===
A 16-player squad was announced on 19 June 2024.

Head coach: Flemming Dam Larsen

No.	Pos.	Name	Date of birth (age)	Height	App.	Goals	Club
1	GK	Stine Almind	9 August 2004 (aged 19)	1.78 m	11	0	(Denmark) Skanderborg Håndbold
3	RB	Clara Bang	30 April 2004 (aged 20)	1.76 m	0	0	(Denmark) Skanderborg Håndbold
6	P	Boline Laursen	13 September 2005 (aged 18)	1.89 m	31	49	(Denmark) Skanderborg Håndbold
7	LW	Matilde Vestergaard	11 September 2004 (aged 19)	1.63 m	0	0	(Denmark) Nykøbing Håndboldklub
8	CB	Ida Nielsen	30 March 2004 (aged 20)	1.68 m	38	48	(Denmark) Roskilde Håndbold
9	LB	Laura Thestrup	21 February 2004 (aged 20)	1.87 m	42	95	(Denmark) Viborg HK
10	P	Filippa Larsen	3 February 2004 (aged 20)	1.80 m	36	67	(Denmark) Skanderborg Håndbold
12	GK	Ida Kaysen	12 April 2004 (aged 20)	1.85 m	40	1	(Denmark) Viborg HK
14	RW	Frederikke Waage-Jensen	10 June 2004 (aged 20)	1.67 m	5	9	(Denmark) Skanderborg Håndbold
17	P	Emma Jensen	28 March 2004 (aged 20)	1.77 m	14	21	(Denmark) Silkeborg-Voel KFUM
18	CB	Martha Nickelsen	22 July 2005 (aged 18)	1.78 m	10	17	(Denmark) København Håndbold
21	RB	Anne Johansen	22 April 2004 (aged 20)	1.72 m	40	146	(Germany) SG BBM Bietigheim
23	RW	Josefine Larsen	8 December 2005 (aged 18)	1.71 m	5	13	(Denmark) Skanderborg Håndbold
24	LB	Esther Lund	21 May 2005 (aged 19)	1.86 m	0	0	(Denmark) Roskilde Håndbold
25	RB	Nanna Vinther	16 November 2005 (aged 18)	1.83 m	8	11	(Denmark) Viborg HK
28	CB	Astrid Lund	15 March 2005 (aged 19)	1.82 m	23	66	(Denmark) Skanderborg Håndbold

=== Japan ===
A 18-player squad was announced on 12 June 2024.

Head coach: Satoshi Kawai

No.	Pos.	Name	Date of birth (age)	Height	App.	Goals	Club
1	GK	Riri Kitabayashi	28 June 2005 (aged 18)	1.60 m	5	0	(Japan) Tokai University
3	RB	Wakana Hokaguchi	23 January 2004 (aged 20)	1.70 m	6	11	(Japan) University of Tsukuba
5	RB	Ayumu Koyama	5 June 2004 (aged 20)	1.63 m	5	24	(Japan) Tokyo Women's College of Physical Education
6	RB	Miu Mizutani	7 July 2004 (aged 19)	1.69 m	6	8	(Japan) Tokai University
7	LB	Mao Hashimoto	22 July 2004 (aged 19)	1.70 m	6	6	(Japan) University of Tsukuba
8	LB	Ayumi Rokugawa	28 July 2004 (aged 19)	1.76 m	6	27	(Japan) University of Tsukuba
9	LB	Ayano Sekino	31 July 2004 (aged 19)	1.62 m	0	0	(Japan) Kokushikan University
10	RB	Risa Konya	27 August 2004 (aged 19)	1.67 m	5	14	(Japan) University of Tsukuba
11	RB	Azuma Konoka	13 September 2004 (aged 19)	1.56 m	6	30	(Japan) Osaka University of Health and Sport Sciences
12	GK	Yukiha Horiuchi	24 November 2005 (aged 18)	1.74 m	4	10	(Japan) Waseda University
14	CB	Yusa Okumura	16 October 2004 (aged 19)	1.67 m	6	20	(Japan) Tokai University
15	CB	Toko Yamaguchi	6 November 2004 (aged 19)	1.64 m	6	18	(Japan) University of Tsukuba
16	GK	Mizuki Sugimoto	2 January 2006 (aged 18)	1.72 m	0	0	(Japan) Kwansei Gakuin University
18	LW	Ayaka Sasaki	28 January 2005 (aged 19)	1.72 m	6	27	(Japan) Nippon Sport Science University
19	LW	Waka Terada	28 April 2005 (aged 19)	1.65 m	6	13	(Japan) Osaka University of Health and Sport Sciences
22	LB	Miu Kawasaki	14 December 2005 (aged 18)	1.71 m	0	0	(Japan) Osaka University of Health and Sport Sciences
23	P	Ai Nakao	27 February 2006 (aged 18)	1.75 m	6	16	(Japan) Osaka University of Health and Sport Sciences
25	P	Mao Kato	30 August 2006 (aged 17)	1.77 m	6	19	(Japan) Showa Gakuin High School

=== Norway ===
A 16-player squad was announced on 24 May 2024.

Head coach: Eirik Haugdal

No.	Pos.	Name	Date of birth (age)	Height	App.	Goals	Club
1	GK	Kadija Mårdalen	7 September 2004 (aged 19)	1.77 m	25	0	(Norway) Tertnes HE
2	LW	Stella Waagan Kruse	7 May 2005 (aged 19)	1.72 m	0	0	(Norway) Aker Topphåndball
3	RW	Pia Grønstad	6 November 2005 (aged 18)	1.80 m	17	45	(Norway) Ålgård HK
4	CB	Sofie Lae	10 October 2004 (aged 19)	1.72 m	11	12	(Norway) Aker Topphåndball
6	LB	Mathea Enger	9 July 2004 (aged 19)	1.70 m	23	35	(Norway) Storhamar HE
8	LW	Selin Kamburce	12 January 2004 (aged 20)	1.65 m	22	53	(Norway) Aker Topphåndball
12	GK	Dina Frisendal	31 July 2004 (aged 19)	1.79 m	25	0	(Norway) IL Gneist
14	LB	Jenny Husaas	5 October 2005 (aged 18)	1.80 m	8	8	(Norway) Aker Topphåndball
15	P	Tuva Pharo	7 July 2004 (aged 19)	1.76 m	18	28	(Norway) Vipers Kristiansand
16	GK	Frida Selnes	28 June 2005 (aged 18)	1.83 m	15	0	(Norway) Byåsen HE
18	P	Eline Solbakken	31 August 2004 (aged 19)	1.84 m	14	9	(Norway) IL Gneist
19	RW	Nicoline Jullumstrø	9 August 2004 (aged 19)	1.61 m	20	55	(Norway) Haslum IL
20	CB	Marie Mjøs	15 April 2004 (aged 20)	1.73 m	22	43	(Norway) Bergen Håndball
23	RB	Emma Edner	28 February 2004 (aged 20)	1.80 m	13	18	(Norway) Fjellhammer IL
26	LB	Nora Rosenberg	15 March 2005 (aged 19)	1.83 m	25	75	(Norway) Larvik Turn
33	LB	Tiril Idland	5 January 2005 (aged 19)	1.72 m	0	0	(Norway) Ålgård HK

== Group E ==
=== Algeria ===
A 17-player squad was announced on 11 June 2024.

Head coach: Rayane Abdelkader

No.	Pos.	Name	Date of birth (age)	Height	App.	Goals	Club
5	CB	Imane Farah	5 September 2004 (aged 19)	1.66 m	6	3	(Algeria) Mouloudia Club de Saïda
6	RW	Sarah Azzi	5 April 2005 (aged 19)	1.70 m	12	24	(Algeria) HBC Mila
8	RB	Kenza Ould Amer	11 March 2005 (aged 19)	1.68 m	12	17	(Algeria) Mouloudia Mouassasat de Batna
10	CB	Hanane Makdoud	13 September 2004 (aged 19)	1.71 m	17	43	(Algeria) MC Alger
11	LB	Maya Fettani	13 April 2005 (aged 19)	1.83 m	0	0	(France) HB Clermont Auvergne Metropole 63
12	CB	Alycia Berkani	30 July 2005 (aged 18)	1.72 m	17	31	(Algeria) Mouloudia Mouassasat de Batna
15	RB	Sanae Naceur	21 October 2006 (aged 17)	1.72 m	0	0	(France) Chevigny Saint Sauveur Handball
16	GK	Zineb Haddad	20 October 2005 (aged 18)	1.75 m	23	2	(Algeria) Nadi Riadhi Kahraba et Ghaz Alger
17	LB	Melissa Chebli	26 November 2005 (aged 18)	1.68 m	12	24	(Algeria) HBC Mila
20	P	Meriem Zidani	20 November 2004 (aged 19)	1.75 m	5	0	(Algeria) Entente sportive d'Aïn Touta
21	LB	Soulef Atmani	31 May 2005 (aged 19)	1.75 m	20	42	(Algeria) HBC El Biar
22	P	Lyna Yelles	22 June 2004 (aged 19)	1.75 m	18	49	(Algeria) MC Alger
27	RB	Lylia Berkani	16 July 2007 (aged 16)	1.72 m	6	28	(Algeria) MC Alger
31	GK	Halima Bakkar	11 December 2004 (aged 19)	1.69 m	6	0	(Algeria) Club Horizon Talent Oran CHTO
33	GK	Oumenia Salah	18 December 2005 (aged 18)	1.70 m	23	3	(Algeria) MC Alger
77	CB	Ines Aissa	5 August 2004 (aged 19)	1.67 m	22	24	(Algeria) MC Alger
99	RB	Warda Radja	15 September 2005 (aged 18)	1.70 m	17	23	(Algeria) Mouloudia Club de Saïda

=== China ===
A 16-player squad was announced on 19 June 2024.

Head coach: Suzana Lazović

No.	Pos.	Name	Date of birth (age)	Height	App.	Goals	Club
1	GK	Sun Yihan	30 April 2006 (aged 18)	1.86 m	0	0	(China) Shandong
3	CB	Pan Fengying	26 November 2006 (aged 17)	1.80 m	0	0	(China) Beijing
5	RB	Zhuo Ziy	8 December 2005 (aged 18)	1.76 m	0	0	(China) Jiangsu
6	LB	Liu Ziran	17 September 2005 (aged 18)	1.82 m	0	0	(China) Shandong
7	LW	Zhang Siyu	19 January 2004 (aged 20)	1.63 m	0	0	(China) Anhui
8	CB	Liang Jing	14 April 2006 (aged 18)	1.75 m	0	0	(China) Anhui
10	RW	Shi Zihan	31 October 2005 (aged 18)	1.70 m	0	0	(China) Jiangsu
12	GK	Yang Chunfeng	17 February 2005 (aged 19)	1.76 m	0	0	(China) Guangxi
13	RW	Zhuang Hongyan	26 March 2004 (aged 20)	1.59 m	12	22	(China) Jiangsu
15	P	Yang Yue	15 March 2006 (aged 18)	1.77 m	0	0	(China) Shandong
18	RB	Wang Jingjing	2 April 2005 (aged 19)	1.72 m	0	0	(China) Anhui
20	P	Hou Changqing	4 October 2004 (aged 19)	1.78 m	0	0	(China) Anhui
22	GK	Li Luyao	14 September 2004 (aged 19)	1.80 m	0	0	(China) Jiangsu
23	LB	Wang Xiaoyun	21 June 2005 (aged 18)	1.70 m	0	0	(China) Shandong
28	CB	Liu Xuedan	13 October 2005 (aged 18)	1.72 m	0	0	(China) Anhui
53	LW	Liu Yuting	18 July 2004 (aged 19)	1.68 m	11	24	(China) Anhui

=== Czech Republic ===
A 17-player squad was announced on 18 June 2024.

Head coach: Dušan Poloz

No.	Pos.	Name	Date of birth (age)	Height	App.	Goals	Club
4	LW	Anna Kubálková	23 November 2004 (aged 19)	1.76 m	33	99	(Czech Republic) DHK Zora Olomouc
5	LB	Veronika Gabrhelová	5 September 2005 (aged 18)	1.81 m	49	94	(Czech Republic) HC Zlín
8	CB	Daniela Šimková	29 November 2005 (aged 18)	1.76 m	35	60	(Czech Republic) HC Zlín
9	LB	Simona Schreibmeierová	10 March 2005 (aged 19)	1.83 m	45	186	(Czech Republic) TJ Jiskra Třeboň
10	RW	Marcela Skácelová	13 June 2004 (aged 20)	1.62 m	21	44	(Czech Republic) DHK Baník Most
11	P	Adéla Brabcová	21 January 2005 (aged 19)	1.77 m	13	16	(Czech Republic) DHK Baník Most
13	P	Karolína Pejšová	11 June 2005 (aged 19)	1.83 m	37	30	(Czech Republic) DHC Slavia Prague
15	P	Anna Jestříbková	29 February 2004 (aged 20)	1.78 m	45	94	(Czech Republic) DHK Baník Most
16	GK	Kristýna Stojarová	12 November 2004 (aged 19)	1.63 m	43	1	(Czech Republic) HC Zlín
17	RB	Adéla Mazánková	26 May 2005 (aged 19)	1.75 m	18	25	(Czech Republic) Házená Jindřichův Hradec
18	LW	Tereza Panošková	22 December 2004 (aged 19)	1.69 m	24	49	(Czech Republic) DHC Plzeň
19	LB	Veronika Vávrová	26 April 2005 (aged 19)	1.78 m	39	129	(Czech Republic) TJ Sokol Lázně Kynžvart
20	LW	Šárka Kapusniaková	5 March 2004 (aged 20)	1.65 m	35	48	(Czech Republic) TJ Sokol Lázně Kynžvart
22	CB	Tereza Kräuterová	11 August 2004 (aged 19)	1.67 m	12	9	(Czech Republic) DHK Zora Olomouc
24	LW	Sofie Behenská	15 October 2004 (aged 19)	1.71 m	7	6	(Czech Republic) DHK Baník Most
25	RB	Eliška Řádová	5 November 2005 (aged 18)	1.75 m	49	101	(Czech Republic) DHK Baník Most
27	GK	Patricie Wizurová	1 June 2005 (aged 19)	1.85 m	42	1	(Czech Republic) DHC Sokol Poruba

=== Sweden ===
A 16-player squad was announced on 19 June 2024.

Head coach: Jesper Östlund

No.	Pos.	Name	Date of birth (age)	Height	App.	Goals	Club
5	LW	Michelle Holgersson	11 October 2004 (aged 19)	1.71 m	3	1	(Sweden) Skuru IK
6	CB	Emma Mihailovic	10 February 2004 (aged 20)	1.83 m	31	133	(Sweden) IK Sävehof
7	LW	Sophie Johansson	17 October 2004 (aged 19)	1.73 m	3	6	(Sweden) IF Hallby
8	RB	Madeleine Rehnberg	22 May 2004 (aged 20)	1.76 m	3	1	(Sweden) IK Sävehof
11	CB	Elise Lönnegren	6 November 2004 (aged 19)	1.75 m	23	36	(Sweden) Lugi HF
12	GK	Ella Johansson	19 November 2004 (aged 19)	1.73 m	14	1	(Sweden) VästeråsIrsta HF
13	LB	Felicia Granat	9 February 2004 (aged 20)	1.80 m	22	39	(Sweden) IK Sävehof
14	P	Stina Wiksfors	23 August 2004 (aged 19)	1.82 m	31	70	(Sweden) IK Sävehof
16	GK	Ida Wall	20 October 2004 (aged 19)	1.80 m	20	0	(Norway) Fjellhammer IL
18	RB	Isabel van Kerkvoorde	27 January 2004 (aged 20)	1.74 m	8	14	(Sweden) Skuru IK
19	RB	Thea Kylberg	20 June 2004 (aged 19)	1.83 m	26	83	(Sweden) IK Sävehof
21	GK	Stina Littorin	23 March 2005 (aged 19)	1.81 m	3	0	(Sweden) Kärra HF
25	RB	Moa Wallin	19 May 2005 (aged 19)	1.82 m	12	31	(Sweden) Önnereds HK
28	RW	Hilma Cantby	30 May 2004 (aged 20)	1.73 m	0	0	(Sweden) IF Hallby
31	P	Ebba Leo	7 May 2004 (aged 20)	1.77 m	12	6	(Sweden) H 65 Höör
32	CB	Elin Österwall	29 June 2005 (aged 18)	1.66 m	0	0	(Sweden) Önnereds HK

== Group F ==
=== France ===
A 18-player squad was announced on 3 June 2024.

Head coach: Éric Baradat

No.	Pos.	Name	Date of birth (age)	Height	App.	Goals	Club
1	GK	Romane Le Huault-Parc	23 April 2005 (aged 19)	1.78 m	12	0	(France) Brest Bretagne Handball
5	RW	Manon Errard	9 February 2005 (aged 19)	1.78 m	19	28	(France) Metz Handball
6	LB	Fatou Karamoko	14 December 2005 (aged 18)	1.76 m	23	38	(France) Stella Saint-Maur Handball
10	RW	Emma Tuccella	8 January 2004 (aged 20)	1.54 m	14	27	(France) Metz Handball
11	LW	Louane Texier	2 August 2005 (aged 18)	1.67 m	14	28	(France) Mérignac Handball
12	GK	Zazie Samzun	24 September 2004 (aged 19)	1.76 m	3	0	(France) OGC Nice Côte d'Azur Handball
13	LB	Assa Sissoko Dabo	13 January 2005 (aged 19)	1.70 m	10	19	(France) Mérignac Handball
14	LW	Nina Dury	16 January 2004 (aged 20)	1.75 m	18	45	(France) Jeanne d'Arc Dijon Handball
15	RB	Alice Monteillet	15 December 2005 (aged 18)	1.80 m	16	29	(France) Metz Handball
17	CB	Enola Borg	31 May 2005 (aged 19)	1.79 m	16	38	(France) Pessac Handball
18	CB	Nina Perret	12 September 2004 (aged 19)	1.72 m	18	66	(France) Jeanne d'Arc Dijon Handball
19	CB	Eva Mbata	9 August 2004 (aged 19)	1.70 m	10	12	(France) Noisy-le-Grand Handball
20	RB	Lina Colinot	8 February 2005 (aged 19)	1.72 m	16	25	(France) Mérignac Handball
21	LW	Séphora Genyah	8 July 2005 (aged 18)	1.52 m	12	26	(France) Stella Saint-Maur Handball
22	P	Clémence Nkindanda	20 June 2004 (aged 19)	1.89 m	19	39	(France) Chambray Touraine Handball
23	P	Lilou Pintat	9 November 2004 (aged 19)	1.80 m	12	16	(France) Jeanne d'Arc Dijon Handball
24	GK	Alix Tignon	1 May 2004 (aged 20)	1.79 m	14	0	(France) Pessac Handball
25	LB	Lylou Borg	31 May 2005 (aged 19)	1.75 m	16	54	(France) Mérignac Handball

=== Germany ===
A 16-player squad was announced on 13 June 2024.

Head coach: Christopher Nordmeyer

No.	Pos.	Name	Date of birth (age)	Height	App.	Goals	Club
2	CB	Lisa Fuchs	30 April 2005 (aged 19)	1.70 m	20	20	(Germany) HC Erlangen
3	LW	Lea Watzl	12 February 2005 (aged 19)	1.68 m	5	6	(Germany) Frisch Auf Göppingen
7	LW	Magdalena Probst	24 January 2004 (aged 20)	1.61 m	15	30	(Germany) VfL Waiblingen
9	LB	Nieke Kühne	9 September 2004 (aged 19)	1.84 m	17	54	(Germany) HSG Blomberg-Lippe
10	LB	Matilda Ehlert	16 December 2004 (aged 19)	1.81 m	18	47	(Germany) VfL Waiblingen
11	RW	Gianina Bianco	21 September 2004 (aged 19)	1.68 m	10	31	(Germany) Kurpfalz Bären
12	GK	Marie Weiss	14 September 2004 (aged 19)	1.81 m	20	2	(Germany) TuS Metzingen
13	RB	Lara Däuble	12 September 2006 (aged 17)	1.70 m	19	61	(Germany) SG Schozach/Bottwartal
14	CB	Lotta Röpcke	23 January 2004 (aged 20)	1.75 m	19	37	(Germany) VfL Oldenburg
16	GK	Zoe Lorisch	29 November 2005 (aged 18)	1.84 m	4	0	(Germany) SV Grün-Weiß Schwerin
17	LB	Leni Ruwe	28 October 2004 (aged 19)	1.77 m	17	27	(Germany) HSG Blomberg-Lippe
19	RW	Sabrina Tröster	19 October 2004 (aged 19)	1.63 m	5	10	(Germany) TuS Metzingen
20	P	Ariane Pfundstein	4 February 2004 (aged 20)	1.78 m	13	32	(Germany) VfL Oldenburg
21	LW	Alina Gaubatz	30 May 2004 (aged 20)	1.70 m	17	42	(Germany) HC Leipzig
22	RB	Julika Birnkammer	19 January 2005 (aged 19)	1.73 m	5	9	(Germany) TSV Haunstetten
23	P	Ida Petzold	8 December 2005 (aged 18)	1.80 m	20	73	(Germany) TuS Metzingen

=== Serbia ===
A 16-player squad was announced on 17 June 2024.

Head coach: Darko Grbić

No.	Pos.	Name	Date of birth (age)	Height	App.	Goals	Club
3	LW	Nataša Ćetković	22 December 2005 (aged 18)	1.73 m	17	33	(Serbia) RK Vojvodina
4	LB	Emilija Todorović	25 December 2005 (aged 18)	1.81 m	9	6	(Serbia) ŽRK Železničar Inđija
5	CB	Nora Fajfrić	18 March 2004 (aged 20)	1.75 m	11	36	(Serbia) ŽORK Jagodina
8	CB	Tamara Mandić	2 August 2005 (aged 18)	1.75 m	23	71	(Serbia) ŽRK Medicinar
10	P	Milica Bahun	1 March 2005 (aged 19)	1.70 m	10	10	(Serbia) RK Vojvodina
11	LB	Nevena Todorovski	10 November 2005 (aged 18)	1.76 m	14	39	(Serbia) RK Vojvodina
12	GK	Anastasija Nedeljković	4 July 2005 (aged 18)	1.87 m	17	4	(Serbia) ŽRK Naisa
13	LW	Nevena Radić	1 October 2005 (aged 18)	1.62 m	3	4	(Serbia) ŽRK Medicinar
14	RW	Anja Vujnović	3 June 2005 (aged 19)	1.66 m	19	21	(Serbia) ŽRK Železničar Inđija
15	RB	Milica Aćimović	31 March 2004 (aged 20)	1.80 m	13	25	(Serbia) RK Crvena zvezda
20	P	Vladana Mitrović	25 May 2004 (aged 20)	1.80 m	19	46	(Serbia) ŽORK Jagodina
21	P	Jana Aleksić	7 April 2005 (aged 19)	1.82 m	0	0	(Serbia) RK Beograd
34	RW	Dunja Radević	25 November 2005 (aged 18)	1.69 m	46	80	(Serbia) ŽRK Budućnost Bemax
44	RB	Milica Ignjatović	17 September 2005 (aged 18)	1.83 m	13	18	(Serbia) ŽRK Železničar Inđija
90	GK	Mina Savić	12 February 2005 (aged 19)	1.69 m	0	0	(Serbia) GŽRK Napredak-12
99	GK	Teodora Vranić	1 October 2004 (aged 19)	1.76 m	6	0	(Austria) HIB Handball Graz

=== Spain ===
A 16-player squad was announced on 10 June 2024.

Head coach: Joaquín Rocamora

No.	Pos.	Name	Date of birth (age)	Height	App.	Goals	Club
2	P	Lyndie Tchaptchet	13 January 2005 (aged 19)	1.85 m	21	60	(Spain) BM Bera Bera
3	LB	Carmen Arroyo	3 March 2004 (aged 20)	1.80 m	18	80	(Spain) BM Bera Bera
4	P	Vanessa Rubio	17 April 2004 (aged 20)	1.80 m	19	20	(Spain) Orriols Marni
7	LB	Maialen Orbañanos	3 October 2005 (aged 18)	1.74 m	17	20	(Spain) BM Zuazo
8	RB	Eider Poles	10 November 2005 (aged 18)	1.72 m	19	103	(Spain) BM Remudas
9	LB	Alba Tort	16 November 2004 (aged 19)	1.82 m	7	19	(Spain) BM Granollers
10	LW	Lucía Laguna	30 October 2004 (aged 19)	1.73 m	17	34	(Spain) BM La Calzada
11	LW	Garoa Sarrionandia-Ibarra	14 February 2004 (aged 20)	1.74 m	16	42	(Spain) BM Zuazo
12	GK	Aida Fernández	30 April 2004 (aged 20)	1.78 m	2	0	(Spain) BM La Calzada
13	RB	Esther Martín-Buró	17 January 2005 (aged 19)	1.77 m	12	19	(Spain) BM Bolaños
14	LW	María Carrillo	27 January 2004 (aged 20)	1.70 m	16	38	(Spain) CB Elche
15	LW	Ugazi Manterola	18 November 2004 (aged 19)	1.69 m	5	6	(Spain) Zarautz
16	GK	Marián Mera	27 August 2004 (aged 19)	1.67 m	17	0	(Spain) BM Pereda
17	LB	Ester Somaza	3 June 2004 (aged 20)	1.78 m	15	63	(Spain) BM Granollers
18	P	Eider Tapia	4 April 2005 (aged 19)	1.77 m	19	12	(Spain) Zarautz
20	RW	Paula Agulló	10 June 2005 (aged 19)	1.66 m	19	41	(Spain) CB Elche

== Group G ==
=== Guinea ===
A 17-player squad was announced on 19 June 2024.

Head coach: Lansana Camara

No.	Pos.	Name	Date of birth (age)	Height	App.	Goals	Club
1	GK	Fatoumata Soumah	11 November 2006 (aged 17)	1.61 m	2	0	(Guinea) Union Sportive de Guinée
2	CB	Mariama Bangoura	25 October 2005 (aged 18)	1.61 m	11	62	(Guinea) Kamsar Handball Club
3	P	Diaraye Soumah	10 August 2006 (aged 17)	1.65 m	7	21	(Guinea) Union Sportive de Guinée
5	RW	Aissatou Diallo	14 February 2008 (aged 16)	1.59 m	5	23	(Guinea) Fria Handball Club
6	P	Fatoumata Diassy	28 September 2004 (aged 19)	1.67 m	5	23	(Guinea) Association sportive des mineurs de Sangarédi
8	RW	Kadiatou Sankhon	18 March 2005 (aged 19)	1.65 m	11	49	(Guinea) Union Sportive de Guinée
10	LB	Mama Konaté	28 January 2004 (aged 20)	1.75 m	8	19	(Guinea) Kamsar Handball Club
12	RW	M'mah Soumah	21 October 2004 (aged 19)	1.65 m	4	23	(Guinea) Kamsar Handball Club
13	P	Diakonba Cissé	27 December 2004 (aged 19)	1.61 m	4	5	No club
15	P	Mayelie Soumah	12 June 2004 (aged 20)	1.60 m	10	48	(Guinea) Kamsar Handball Club
16	GK	M'Mahawa Conté	19 December 2006 (aged 17)	1.61 m	0	0	(Guinea) Alu Star de Fria
17	RW	Adama Coumbassa	14 April 2007 (aged 17)	1.65 m	0	0	(Guinea) Stade de Guinée
18	P	Aminata Kaba	12 June 2008 (aged 16)	1.79 m	0	0	(Guinea) Stade de Guinée
22	GK	Mabinty Bangoura	16 November 2004 (aged 19)	1.65 m	10	0	(Guinea) Union Sportive de Guinée
23	P	Fatoumata Keïta	30 June 2007 (aged 16)	1.60 m	1	2	(Guinea) Espoir Olympique
26	RB	Mariétou Camara	26 October 2004 (aged 19)	1.55 m	2	7	(Guinea) Espoir Olympique
30	LB	Aïcha Bangoura	5 November 2006 (aged 17)	1.65 m	5	24	(Guinea) Union Sportive de Guinée

=== Montenegro ===
A 17-player squad was announced on 18 June 2024.

Head coach: Igor Marković

No.	Pos.	Name	Date of birth (age)	Height	App.	Goals	Club
1	GK	Aleksandra Kecojević	16 July 2005 (aged 18)	1.78 m	0	0	(Montenegro) RK Trebjesa
2	CB	Nađa Micevski	17 April 2004 (aged 20)	1.72 m	15	32	(Hungary) Kisvárdai KC
4	RW	Jovana Jovanović	12 June 2005 (aged 19)	1.76 m	5	2	(Serbia) ŽRK Medicinar
7	LB	Kristina Arsenijević	13 June 2005 (aged 19)	1.87 m	8	4	(Montenegro) ŽRK Tivat
9	RW	Maša Kuzmanović	20 March 2004 (aged 20)	1.70 m	10	12	(Montenegro) RK Rudar Pljevlja
11	RB	Jelena Vukčević	11 December 2004 (aged 19)	1.73 m	25	45	(Montenegro) ŽRK Budućnost Podgorica
13	LW	Ivana Vujadinović	21 November 2004 (aged 19)	1.69 m	14	20	(Montenegro) RK Rudar Pljevlja
14	CB	Nikolina Marković	26 January 2004 (aged 20)	1.78 m	10	15	(Montenegro) ŽRK Budućnost Podgorica
15	CB	Anđela Milošević	16 June 2004 (aged 20)	1.77 m	10	10	(Montenegro) RK Rudar Pljevlja
16	GK	Marija Marsenić	6 May 2004 (aged 20)	1.82 m	10	0	(Montenegro) RK Rudar Pljevlja
17	P	Andrea Brajović	21 November 2004 (aged 19)	1.86 m	7	5	(Montenegro) RK Rudar Pljevlja
19	CB	Sara Burić	27 July 2005 (aged 18)	1.84 m	7	3	(Montenegro) RK Rudar Pljevlja
20	P	Ema Kolić	24 March 2004 (aged 20)	1.76 m	12	12	(Montenegro) RK Rudar Pljevlja
22	GK	Aleksandra Bazović	29 May 2004 (aged 20)	1.87 m	7	1	(Kosovo) KHF Istogu
24	RW	Mia Grujić	15 September 2006 (aged 17)	1.76 m	0	0	(Montenegro) RK Rudar Pljevlja
37	P	Hristina Rešetar	22 January 2005 (aged 19)	1.87 m	5	2	(Romania) SCM Craiova
91	LW	Lana Pavićević	9 October 2004 (aged 19)	1.72 m	10	2	(Montenegro) RK Rudar Pljevlja

=== Portugal ===
A 16-player squad was announced on 12 June 2024.

Head coach: José António Silva

No.	Pos.	Name	Date of birth (age)	Height	App.	Goals	Club
1	GK	Rita Guimarães	29 June 2005 (aged 18)	1.69 m	27	0	(Portugal) ABC/UMinho
2	LW	Maria Pico	10 May 2004 (aged 20)	1.63 m	18	31	(Portugal) ABC/UMinho
3	LW	Luana Jesus	22 February 2004 (aged 20)	1.63 m	32	70	(Portugal) CJ Almeida Garrett
4	CB	Bárbara Mendes	10 December 2004 (aged 19)	1.69 m	3	2	(Portugal) CJ Almeida Garrett
5	P	Sofia Ferreira	2 September 2005 (aged 18)	1.66 m	26	71	(Portugal) CJ Almeida Garrett
7	RW	Lola Ribeiro	2 August 2005 (aged 18)	1.64 m	0	0	(France) Handball Clermont Métropole
8	CB	Constança Sequeira	17 February 2004 (aged 20)	1.73 m	53	253	(Portugal) SL Benfica
10	P	Vitória Tabuada	1 February 2005 (aged 19)	1.83 m	9	4	(Portugal) Colégio de Gaia
12	GK	Matilde Rosa	8 July 2005 (aged 18)	1.74 m	58	2	(Portugal) CDE Gil Eanes
13	RW	Júlia Figueira	12 June 2005 (aged 19)	1.65 m	31	52	(Portugal) CJ Almeida Garrett
16	GK	Mariana Silva	18 June 2005 (aged 19)	1.73 m	24	3	(Portugal) CJ Almeida Garrett
17	RB	Joana Semedo	4 February 2005 (aged 19)	1.79 m	29	34	(Portugal) SL Benfica
19	P	Matilde Correia	29 June 2005 (aged 18)	1.78 m	22	35	(Portugal) CDE Gil Eanes
25	RB	Luciana Rebelo	25 July 2005 (aged 18)	1.87 m	51	200	(Denmark) Team Esbjerg
27	CB	Clémentine Silva	26 July 2006 (aged 17)	1.63 m	12	41	(France) Entente Saone Mamirolle
81	LB	Carmen Figueiredo	3 January 2005 (aged 19)	1.78 m	54	145	(Portugal) CDE Gil Eanes

=== Uzbekistan ===
A 13-player squad was announced on 19 June 2024.

Head coach: Zafar Azimov

No.	Pos.	Name	Date of birth (age)	Height	App.	Goals	Club
1	GK	Marjona Ibragimova	19 November 2004 (aged 19)	1.71 m	8	6	No club
3	RB	Sarbinaz Saparbaeva	23 December 2006 (aged 17)	1.62 m	9	55	No club
4	LB	Zarema Alimova	23 May 2005 (aged 19)	1.71 m	3	33	(Uzbekistan) Almalyk Mining And Metallurgical Complex
8	RB	Shakhlo Abyllaeva	13 December 2004 (aged 19)	1.70 m	8	16	No club
12	GK	Rukhshona Ruzieva	9 April 2005 (aged 19)	1.73 m	8	22	No club
14	P	Anastasiya Khudoyarova	8 November 2005 (aged 18)	1.73 m	4	20	No club
15	LW	Ilmira Bayjanova	30 May 2008 (aged 16)	1.67 m	1	10	No club
17	CB	Sabina Mullaeva	8 January 2005 (aged 19)	1.57 m	8	38	(Uzbekistan) Almalyk Mining And Metallurgical Complex
26	P	Gulasal Iminjonova	10 February 2004 (aged 20)	1.60 m	8	22	(Uzbekistan) Almalyk Mining And Metallurgical Complex
44	LW	Shodiyona Fozilova	30 November 2004 (aged 19)	1.70 m	3	17	No club
66	P	Lobar Shamieva	18 April 2004 (aged 20)	1.72 m	8	31	(Uzbekistan) Almalyk Mining And Metallurgical Complex
76	RB	Zulaykho Marimboeva	2 September 2004 (aged 19)	1.60 m	10	60	No club
77	LB	Sevinch Erkabaeva	23 September 2004 (aged 19)	1.72 m	9	80	No club

== Group H ==
=== Angola ===
A 16-player squad was announced on 8 June 2024.

Head coach: José Chuma

No.	Pos.	Name	Date of birth (age)	Height	App.	Goals	Club
1	GK	Carla Mulamba	20 December 2004 (aged 19)	1.80 m	5	0	(Angola) CD Primeiro de Agosto
3	RW	Ivandra Geraldo	3 January 2004 (aged 20)	1.83 m	0	0	(Angola) Electro SC do Lobito
4	LW	Marcela Tati	12 December 2004 (aged 19)	1.78 m	23	41	(Angola) CD Primeiro de Agosto
6	LW	Elisandra Luango	20 January 2005 (aged 19)	1.68 m	8	12	(Angola) CD Primeiro de Agosto
7	LB	Bernadeth Belo	2 January 2004 (aged 20)	1.82 m	30	61	(Angola) CD Primeiro de Agosto
8	CB	Rosa Matos	4 April 2004 (aged 20)	1.70 m	5	0	(Angola) CD Primeiro de Agosto
9	LW	Elisandra Pedro	6 April 2004 (aged 20)	1.75 m	12	9	(Portugal) Academia de Andebol de São Pedro do Sul
10	P	Marissone Capessa	20 January 2005 (aged 19)	1.78 m	6	8	(Angola) CD Primeiro de Agosto
13	RW	Balbina Nunda	29 October 2006 (aged 17)	1.73 m	0	0	(Angola) CD Primeiro de Agosto
15	P	Sandy Fernando	27 February 2004 (aged 20)	1.82 m	0	0	(Angola) CD Primeiro de Agosto
16	GK	Juliana Dala	24 April 2004 (aged 20)	1.82 m	6	0	(Angola) Atlético Petróleos de Luanda
19	LW	Maúde Xavier	11 September 2004 (aged 19)	1.82 m	7	15	(Angola) Casa do Pessoal do Porto do Lobito
20	CB	Isabel Simões	26 October 2004 (aged 19)	1.75 m	6	12	(Angola) Casa do Pessoal do Porto do Lobito
31	LW	Lurdes Pedro	4 February 2004 (aged 20)	1.76 m	12	7	(Angola) CD Primeiro de Agosto
35	RW	Anísia de Carvalho	27 February 2004 (aged 20)	1.70 m	5	7	(Angola) Atlético Petróleos de Luanda
77	CB	Jorcela Tumba	27 July 2005 (aged 18)	1.82 m	8	10	(Angola) CD Primeiro de Agosto

=== Iceland ===
A 16-player squad was announced on 12 June 2024.

Head coach: Ágúst Þór Jóhannsson

No.	Pos.	Name	Date of birth (age)	Height	App.	Goals	Club
2	CB	Elín Klara Þorkelsdóttir	14 September 2004 (aged 19)	1.69 m	21	100	(Iceland) Haukar Handball
3	LB	Alfa Brá Oddsdóttir Hagalín	27 April 2005 (aged 19)	1.80 m	13	15	(Iceland) Fram
4	P	Brynja Katrín Benediktsdóttir	14 October 2004 (aged 19)	1.80 m	13	15	(Iceland) Fimleikafélag Hafnarfjarðar
5	RB	Tinna Sigurrós Traustadóttir	5 May 2004 (aged 20)	1.75 m	22	85	(Iceland) Selfoss
6	RW	Katrín Anna Ásmundsdóttir	4 July 2004 (aged 19)	1.70 m	24	52	(Iceland) Íþróttafélagið Grótta
7	RB	Hildur Lilja Jónsdóttir	9 April 2004 (aged 20)	1.77 m	12	7	(Iceland) Ungmennafélagið Afturelding
8	LB	Inga Dís Jóhannsdóttir	27 March 2004 (aged 20)	1.81 m	23	57	(Iceland) Haukar Handball
11	LW	Rakel Oddný Guðmundsdóttir	26 June 2004 (aged 19)	1.68 m	18	12	(Iceland) Haukar Handball
12	GK	Ethel Gyða Bjarnasen	30 July 2005 (aged 18)	1.80 m	10	0	(Iceland) Fram
13	P	Elínborg Katla Þorbjörnsdóttir	25 March 2004 (aged 20)	1.76 m	6	2	(Iceland) Selfoss
14	P	Elísa Elíasdóttir	31 July 2004 (aged 19)	1.76 m	14	36	(Iceland) Íþróttabandalag Vestmannaeyja
15	RW	Sonja Lind Sigsteinsdóttir	14 January 2004 (aged 20)	1.63 m	10	9	(Iceland) Haukar Handball
18	LW	Lilja Ágústsdóttir	30 April 2004 (aged 20)	1.70 m	23	125	(Iceland) Valur
19	CB	Embla Steindórsdóttir	7 December 2005 (aged 18)	1.73 m	23	25	(Iceland) Stjarnan
32	GK	Anna Karólína Ingadóttir	11 June 2004 (aged 20)	1.80 m	0	0	(Iceland) Íþróttafélagið Grótta
35	LB	Sylvía Sigríður Jónsdóttir	15 June 2004 (aged 20)	1.69 m	0	0	(Iceland) Íþróttafélag Reykjavíkur

=== North Macedonia ===
A 18-player squad was announced on 23 May 2024.

Head coach: Darko Janev

No.	Pos.	Name	Date of birth (age)	Height	App.	Goals	Club
1	GK	Matea Churlinovska	6 December 2005 (aged 18)	1.75 m	0	0	(North Macedonia) WHC Gjorche Petrov
3	LB	Sara Stefanoska	11 January 2005 (aged 19)	1.73 m	0	0	(Serbia) ŽORK Jagodina
4	P	Anastasija Trpeska	21 April 2006 (aged 18)	1.80 m	0	0	(North Macedonia) ŽRK Metalurg
6	RW	Bojana Radevska	16 September 2004 (aged 19)	1.67 m	0	0	(North Macedonia) ŽRK Vardar
7	RW	Rosana Pavlova	26 December 2004 (aged 19)	1.65 m	0	0	(North Macedonia) ŽRK Skopje
8	P	Nina Popova	19 December 2004 (aged 19)	1.86 m	0	0	(North Macedonia) ŽRK Vardar
14	P	Hana Miftari	15 August 2006 (aged 17)	1.78 m	0	0	(North Macedonia) ŽRK Çair
16	GK	Marija Jovanovska	30 August 2004 (aged 19)	1.80 m	0	0	(North Macedonia) ŽRK Kumanovo
18	LW	Jana Ravojska	19 October 2004 (aged 19)	1.80 m	0	0	(North Macedonia) ŽRK Skopje
19	CB	Eva Gjorgjievska	12 October 2006 (aged 17)	1.61 m	0	0	(North Macedonia) ŽRK Ilinden Vardar
21	LW	Leona Milenkoska	12 October 2007 (aged 16)	1.73 m	0	0	(North Macedonia) ŽRK Vardar
23	LB	Mihaela Kraleva	20 November 2006 (aged 17)	1.83 m	0	0	(North Macedonia) ŽRK Metalurg
24	RB	Borjana Koceva	29 June 2004 (aged 19)	1.73 m	0	0	(North Macedonia) ŽRK Vardar
25	LB	Anastasija Velichkovska	27 April 2005 (aged 19)	1.75 m	0	0	(North Macedonia) ŽRK Ilinden Vardar
43	RW	Emilijana Rizoska	21 May 2005 (aged 19)	1.65 m	0	0	(North Macedonia) WHC Gjorche Petrov
46	GK	Veronika Gjorgjievska	5 August 2005 (aged 18)	1.74 m	0	0	(North Macedonia) ŽRK Vardar
77	LB	Sara Bogojeska	15 June 2005 (aged 19)	1.80 m	0	0	(North Macedonia) ŽRK Kumanovo
91	RB	Iva Mladenovska	14 January 2007 (aged 17)	1.80 m	0	0	(France) Brest Bretagne Handball

=== United States ===
A 15-player squad was announced on 16 June 2024.

Head coach: Hendrik Schultze

No.	Pos.	Name	Date of birth (age)	Height	App.	Goals	Club
1	GK	Julia Malysz	22 September 2005 (aged 18)	1.70 m	5	0	(United States) Chicago Inter Handball
2	LW	Mayte Martinez	28 October 2005 (aged 18)	1.60 m	0	0	No club
5	LB	Daisy Licea	23 May 2004 (aged 20)	1.60 m	11	33	No club
6	LB	Ia Hannevik	23 September 2007 (aged 16)	1.70 m	0	0	(Norway) Stabæk Håndball
7	LB	Lovisa Dobreff	11 October 2005 (aged 18)	1.76 m	11	7	(Sweden) IK Bolton
8	P	Erin Jeong	6 January 2005 (aged 19)	1.68 m	0	0	(United States) Ohio State Handball
10	RB	Isabela Da Cruz	26 February 2006 (aged 18)	1.76 m	5	5	(France) Jeanne d'Arc Dijon Handball
12	LW	Amanda Sumalla	4 February 2006 (aged 18)	1.65 m	0	0	(United States) Inter Miami Handball
13	LW	Viva Kreis	31 January 2005 (aged 19)	1.65 m	11	5	(France) Saint-Amand Handball
15	CB	Emma Ready	7 March 2005 (aged 19)	1.63 m	0	0	(Norway) Utleira IL
16	GK	Lani Gronwald	2 January 2004 (aged 20)	1.67 m	7	0	(Germany) Frisch Auf Göppingen
17	P	Maya Ready	6 June 2007 (aged 17)	1.74 m	0	0	(Norway) Utleira IL
19	GK	Sophia Menchaca	2 January 2006 (aged 18)	1.65 m	0	0	Balonmano Espartano Mexico
21	P	Hanna Faulkner	21 March 2005 (aged 19)	1.70 m	14	21	(United States) Ohio State Handball
23	RW	Eden Nesper	14 January 2005 (aged 19)	1.62 m	7	32	(Germany) TV Hannover-Badenstedt
