= 2023 European Women's U-19 Handball Championship =

Tournament details
- Host country: Romania
- Venues: 2 (in 2 host cities)
- Dates: 6–16 July
- Teams: 16 (from 1 confederation)

Final positions
- Champions: Hungary (3rd title)
- Runners-up: Denmark
- Third place: Romania
- Fourth place: Portugal

Tournament statistics
- Matches played: 56
- Goals scored: 3,293 (58.8 per match)
- Attendance: 26,412 (472 per match)
- Top scorers: (Denmark) Julie Scaglione (68 goals)

Awards
- Best player: (Hungary) Petra Simon

The 2023 European Women's U-19 Handball Championship was the 14th edition of the European Women's U-19 Handball Championship, and was held in Piteşti and Mioveni, Romania from 6 to 16 July 2023.

== Host selection ==
- Romania

Romania won the hosting rights at an EHF meeting in Luxembourg on 23 September 2022.

== Qualification ==
Competition	Dates	Host	Vacancies	Qualified
Host nation	23 September 2022	Luxembourg	1	Romania
Women's 17 EHF EURO 2021	5–15 August 2021	(Montenegro) Podgorica	11	Hungary; Germany; Denmark; Croatia; Norway; Montenegro; Switzerland; Portugal; France; Sweden; Czech Republic
Women's 17 EHF Championship 2021	6–15 August 2021	(Italy) Chieti	2	Netherlands; Serbia
Women's 17 EHF Championship 2021	7–15 August 2021	(Lithuania) Klaipėda	2	North Macedonia; Iceland

== Venues ==
The venues were in Piteşti and Mioveni.

Piteşti	Mioveni	2023 European Women's U-19 Handball Championship is located in Romania
Pitești Arena; Capacity: 4,900	Sports Hall; Capacity: 2,500	2023 European Women's U-19 Handball Championship is located in Romania

== Draw ==
The draw was held on 28 February 2023 in Vienna.

Pot 1	Pot 2	Pot 3	Pot 4
Croatia; Denmark; Germany; Hungary	Montenegro; Norway; Romania; Switzerland	Czech Republic; France; Portugal; Sweden	Iceland; North Macedonia; Netherlands; Serbia

== Preliminary round ==
All times are local (UTC+2).

=== Group A ===
Pos	Team	Pld	W	D	L	GF	GA	GD	Pts	Qualification
1	Sweden	3	3	0	0	96	71	+25	6	Main round
2	Switzerland	3	2	0	1	97	92	+5	4	Main round
3	Netherlands	3	1	0	2	85	85	0	2	Intermediate round
4	Croatia	3	0	0	3	72	102	−30	0	Intermediate round

Source: EHF
Rules for classification: 1) points; 2) head-to-head points; 3) head-to-head goal difference; 4) head-to-head number of goals scored; 5) goal difference.

6 July 2023; 12:45	Croatia	16−34	Sweden	Pitești Arena, Pitești; Attendance: 100; Referees: Kull, Tint (EST)
6 July 2023; 12:45	Kosovac 5	(10−15)	Mihailovic, Smedberg, Wiksfors 5	Pitești Arena, Pitești; Attendance: 100; Referees: Kull, Tint (EST)
6 July 2023; 12:45	1× (yellow card) 6× (suspension) 1× (red card)	Report	3× (suspension)	Pitești Arena, Pitești; Attendance: 100; Referees: Kull, Tint (EST)

6 July 2023; 15:00	Switzerland	32−27	Netherlands	Pitești Arena, Pitești; Attendance: 150; Referees: Jović, Arnautović (BIH)
6 July 2023; 15:00	Meier 12	(13−14)	Bakker 7	Pitești Arena, Pitești; Attendance: 150; Referees: Jović, Arnautović (BIH)
6 July 2023; 15:00	1× (yellow card) 4× (suspension)	Report	3× (suspension)	Pitești Arena, Pitești; Attendance: 150; Referees: Jović, Arnautović (BIH)

7 July 2023; 13:00	Netherlands	34−26	Croatia	Pitești Arena, Pitești; Attendance: 100; Referees: Duplîi, Pobedrina (UKR)
7 July 2023; 13:00	Loy, Maarschalkerweerd 6	(17−15)	Lujić 11	Pitești Arena, Pitești; Attendance: 100; Referees: Duplîi, Pobedrina (UKR)
7 July 2023; 13:00	1× (yellow card) 7× (suspension)	Report	1× (yellow card) 4× (suspension)	Pitești Arena, Pitești; Attendance: 100; Referees: Duplîi, Pobedrina (UKR)

7 July 2023; 15:15	Sweden	35−31	Switzerland	Pitești Arena, Pitești; Attendance: 200; Referees: Ivanović, Vujisić (MNE)
7 July 2023; 15:15	Granat 9	(19−17)	Meier 7	Pitești Arena, Pitești; Attendance: 200; Referees: Ivanović, Vujisić (MNE)
7 July 2023; 15:15	5× (suspension)	Report	1× (yellow card) 6× (suspension)	Pitești Arena, Pitești; Attendance: 200; Referees: Ivanović, Vujisić (MNE)

9 July 2023; 13:00	Croatia	30−34	Switzerland	Pitești Arena, Pitești; Attendance: 100; Referees: Simone, Monitillo (ITA)
9 July 2023; 13:00	Zrilić 12	(20−18)	Emmenegger 11	Pitești Arena, Pitești; Attendance: 100; Referees: Simone, Monitillo (ITA)
9 July 2023; 13:00	5× (suspension)	Report	5× (suspension)	Pitești Arena, Pitești; Attendance: 100; Referees: Simone, Monitillo (ITA)

9 July 2023; 15:15	Sweden	27−24	Netherlands	Pitești Arena, Pitești; Attendance: 400; Referees: Sîrbu, Serdiuc (MDA)
9 July 2023; 15:15	Wiksfors 7	(11−12)	Bakker 6	Pitești Arena, Pitești; Attendance: 400; Referees: Sîrbu, Serdiuc (MDA)
9 July 2023; 15:15	3× (suspension)	Report	2× (yellow card) 6× (suspension) 1× (red card)	Pitești Arena, Pitești; Attendance: 400; Referees: Sîrbu, Serdiuc (MDA)

=== Group B ===
Pos	Team	Pld	W	D	L	GF	GA	GD	Pts	Qualification
1	Portugal	3	2	0	1	106	84	+22	4 (Note: Portugal 2 Pts, +5 GD; Romania 2 Pts, –1 GD; Germany 2 Pts, –4 GD)	Main round
2	Romania (H)	3	2	0	1	106	99	+7	4	Main round
3	Germany	3	2	0	1	88	91	−3	4	Intermediate round
4	Iceland	3	0	0	3	90	116	−26	0	Intermediate round

Source: EHF
Rules for classification: 1) points; 2) head-to-head points; 3) head-to-head goal difference; 4) head-to-head number of goals scored; 5) goal difference.
(H) Hosts
Notes:

6 July 2023; 17:15	Germany	27−26	Portugal	Pitești Arena, Pitești; Attendance: 200; Referees: Sîrbu, Serdiuc (MDA)
6 July 2023; 17:15	Petzold 6	(13−11)	Gonçalves 7	Pitești Arena, Pitești; Attendance: 200; Referees: Sîrbu, Serdiuc (MDA)
6 July 2023; 17:15	1× (yellow card) 4× (suspension)	Report	1× (yellow card) 4× (suspension)	Pitești Arena, Pitești; Attendance: 200; Referees: Sîrbu, Serdiuc (MDA)

6 July 2023; 19:45	Romania	41−33	Iceland	Pitești Arena, Pitești; Attendance: 900; Referees: Barysas, Petrušis (LTU)
6 July 2023; 19:45	Lixăndroiu 9	(22−14)	Ágústsdóttir 10	Pitești Arena, Pitești; Attendance: 900; Referees: Barysas, Petrušis (LTU)
6 July 2023; 19:45	5× (suspension)	Report	1× (yellow card) 5× (suspension)	Pitești Arena, Pitești; Attendance: 900; Referees: Barysas, Petrušis (LTU)

7 July 2023; 17:30	Iceland	30−31	Germany	Pitești Arena, Pitești; Attendance: 200; Referees: Simone, Monitillo (ITA)
7 July 2023; 17:30	Þorkelsdóttir 9	(16−13)	Kühne 8	Pitești Arena, Pitești; Attendance: 200; Referees: Simone, Monitillo (ITA)
7 July 2023; 17:30	1× (yellow card) 8× (suspension)	Report	6× (suspension)	Pitești Arena, Pitești; Attendance: 200; Referees: Simone, Monitillo (ITA)

7 July 2023; 19:45	Portugal	36−30	Romania	Pitești Arena, Pitești; Attendance: 1,000; Referees: Jović, Arnautović (BIH)
7 July 2023; 19:45	Rebelo 12	(17−15)	Lixăndroiu 8	Pitești Arena, Pitești; Attendance: 1,000; Referees: Jović, Arnautović (BIH)
7 July 2023; 19:45	3× (suspension)	Report	2× (suspension)	Pitești Arena, Pitești; Attendance: 1,000; Referees: Jović, Arnautović (BIH)

9 July 2023; 17:30	Portugal	44−27	Iceland	Pitești Arena, Pitești; Attendance: 500; Referees: Ivanović, Vujisić (MNE)
9 July 2023; 17:30	Rebelo 10	(22−10)	Þorkelsdóttir 6	Pitești Arena, Pitești; Attendance: 500; Referees: Ivanović, Vujisić (MNE)
9 July 2023; 17:30	1× (yellow card) 4× (suspension)	Report	1× (yellow card) 6× (suspension)	Pitești Arena, Pitești; Attendance: 500; Referees: Ivanović, Vujisić (MNE)

9 July 2023; 19:45	Germany	30−35	Romania	Pitești Arena, Pitești; Attendance: 1,268; Referees: Barysas, Petrušis (LTU)
9 July 2023; 19:45	Pfundstein 6	(15−18)	Boiciuc, Lixăndroiu 7	Pitești Arena, Pitești; Attendance: 1,268; Referees: Barysas, Petrušis (LTU)
9 July 2023; 19:45	6× (suspension)	Report	1× (suspension)	Pitești Arena, Pitești; Attendance: 1,268; Referees: Barysas, Petrušis (LTU)

=== Group C ===
Pos	Team	Pld	W	D	L	GF	GA	GD	Pts	Qualification
1	Hungary	3	3	0	0	90	75	+15	6	Main round
2	France	3	2	0	1	93	76	+17	4	Main round
3	Norway	3	1	0	2	71	85	−14	2	Intermediate round
4	Serbia	3	0	0	3	74	92	−18	0	Intermediate round

Source: EHF
Rules for classification: 1) points; 2) head-to-head points; 3) head-to-head goal difference; 4) head-to-head number of goals scored; 5) goal difference.

6 July 2023; 12:45	Hungary	30−29	France	Sports Hall, Mioveni; Attendance: 250; Referees: Duplîi, Pobedrina (UKR)
6 July 2023; 12:45	Simon 7	(12−15)	Perret 6	Sports Hall, Mioveni; Attendance: 250; Referees: Duplîi, Pobedrina (UKR)
6 July 2023; 12:45	5× (suspension)	Report	4× (suspension)	Sports Hall, Mioveni; Attendance: 250; Referees: Duplîi, Pobedrina (UKR)

6 July 2023; 15:00	Norway	27−26	Serbia	Sports Hall, Mioveni; Attendance: 250; Referees: Christidi, Papamattheou (GRE)
6 July 2023; 15:00	Lunde 5	(11−13)	Vasić 9	Sports Hall, Mioveni; Attendance: 250; Referees: Christidi, Papamattheou (GRE)
6 July 2023; 15:00	2× (suspension)	Report	3× (suspension)	Sports Hall, Mioveni; Attendance: 250; Referees: Christidi, Papamattheou (GRE)

7 July 2023; 13:00	Serbia	26−32	Hungary	Sports Hall, Mioveni; Referees: Manea, Iliescu (ROU)
7 July 2023; 13:00	Mandić 9	(13−17)	Simon 7	Sports Hall, Mioveni; Referees: Manea, Iliescu (ROU)
7 July 2023; 13:00	4× (suspension)	Report	1× (yellow card) 7× (suspension)	Sports Hall, Mioveni; Referees: Manea, Iliescu (ROU)

7 July 2023; 15:15	France	31−24	Norway	Sports Hall, Mioveni; Attendance: 230; Referees: Kull, Tint (EST)
7 July 2023; 15:15	Sissoko 8	(17−13)	Grønstad, Lunde, Rosenberg 4	Sports Hall, Mioveni; Attendance: 230; Referees: Kull, Tint (EST)
7 July 2023; 15:15	3× (suspension) 1× (red card)	Report	1× (yellow card) 3× (suspension)	Sports Hall, Mioveni; Attendance: 230; Referees: Kull, Tint (EST)

9 July 2023; 17:30	Hungary	28−20	Norway	Sports Hall, Mioveni; Attendance: 259; Referees: Jović, Arnautović (BIH)
9 July 2023; 17:30	Simon 6	(13−8)	Hedenstad 4	Sports Hall, Mioveni; Attendance: 259; Referees: Jović, Arnautović (BIH)
9 July 2023; 17:30	3× (suspension)	Report	4× (suspension)	Sports Hall, Mioveni; Attendance: 259; Referees: Jović, Arnautović (BIH)

9 July 2023; 19:45	France	33−22	Serbia	Sports Hall, Mioveni; Attendance: 150; Referees: Duplîi, Pobedrina (UKR)
9 July 2023; 19:45	Texier, Tuccella 5	(16−12)	Aćimović, Fajfrić, Vasić 5	Sports Hall, Mioveni; Attendance: 150; Referees: Duplîi, Pobedrina (UKR)
9 July 2023; 19:45	5× (suspension)	Report	3× (suspension)	Sports Hall, Mioveni; Attendance: 150; Referees: Duplîi, Pobedrina (UKR)

=== Group D ===
Pos	Team	Pld	W	D	L	GF	GA	GD	Pts	Qualification
1	Denmark	3	2	1	0	104	82	+22	5 (Note: Denmark 29–29 Montenegro)	Main round
2	Montenegro	3	2	1	0	91	83	+8	5	Main round
3	Czech Republic	3	1	0	2	80	89	−9	2	Intermediate round
4	North Macedonia	3	0	0	3	80	101	−21	0	Intermediate round

Source: EHF
Rules for classification: 1) points; 2) head-to-head points; 3) head-to-head goal difference; 4) head-to-head number of goals scored; 5) goal difference.
Notes:

6 July 2023; 17:15	Denmark	36−26	Czech Republic	Sports Hall, Mioveni; Attendance: 270; Referees: Manea, Iliescu (ROU)
6 July 2023; 17:15	Scaglione 9	(15−11)	Schreibmeierová 7	Sports Hall, Mioveni; Attendance: 270; Referees: Manea, Iliescu (ROU)
6 July 2023; 17:15	1× (yellow card) 2× (suspension)	Report	1× (yellow card) 2× (suspension)	Sports Hall, Mioveni; Attendance: 270; Referees: Manea, Iliescu (ROU)

6 July 2023; 19:45	Montenegro	33−29	North Macedonia	Sports Hall, Mioveni; Attendance: 148; Referees: Simone, Monitillo (ITA)
6 July 2023; 19:45	Marković 10	(19−16)	Jankulovska, Stefanoska 6	Sports Hall, Mioveni; Attendance: 148; Referees: Simone, Monitillo (ITA)
6 July 2023; 19:45	1× (yellow card) 3× (suspension)	Rrport	6× (suspension)	Sports Hall, Mioveni; Attendance: 148; Referees: Simone, Monitillo (ITA)

7 July 2023; 17:30	North Macedonia	27−39	Denmark	Sports Hall, Mioveni; Attendance: 200; Referees: Sîrbu, Serdiuc (MDA)
7 July 2023; 17:30	Mladenovska 7	(13−18)	Scaglione 11	Sports Hall, Mioveni; Attendance: 200; Referees: Sîrbu, Serdiuc (MDA)
7 July 2023; 17:30	2× (suspension)	Report	2× (yellow card) 3× (suspension)	Sports Hall, Mioveni; Attendance: 200; Referees: Sîrbu, Serdiuc (MDA)

7 July 2023; 19:45	Czech Republic	25−29	Montenegro	Sports Hall, Mioveni; Attendance: 250; Referees: Barysas, Petrušis (LTU)
7 July 2023; 19:45	Kubálková 5	(13−12)	Vukčević 8	Sports Hall, Mioveni; Attendance: 250; Referees: Barysas, Petrušis (LTU)
7 July 2023; 19:45	3× (suspension)	Report	3× (suspension)	Sports Hall, Mioveni; Attendance: 250; Referees: Barysas, Petrušis (LTU)

9 July 2023; 13:00	Denmark	29−29	Montenegro	Sports Hall, Mioveni; Attendance: 245; Referees: Manea, Iliescu (ROU)
9 July 2023; 13:00	Scaglione 12	(15−13)	Milošević, Vukčević 7	Sports Hall, Mioveni; Attendance: 245; Referees: Manea, Iliescu (ROU)
9 July 2023; 13:00	2× (yellow card) 5× (suspension)	Report	1× (yellow card) 2× (suspension)	Sports Hall, Mioveni; Attendance: 245; Referees: Manea, Iliescu (ROU)

9 July 2023; 15:15	Czech Republic	29−24	North Macedonia	Sports Hall, Mioveni; Attendance: 270; Referees: Kull, Tint (EST)
9 July 2023; 15:15	Schreibmeierová 7	(12−13)	Stefanoska 6	Sports Hall, Mioveni; Attendance: 270; Referees: Kull, Tint (EST)
9 July 2023; 15:15	1× (yellow card) 5× (suspension)	Report	3× (suspension)	Sports Hall, Mioveni; Attendance: 270; Referees: Kull, Tint (EST)

== Intermediate round ==
The intermediate groups were numbered III and IV. The teams that qualified for this phase retained their points and goal difference obtained in games played against the teams from the same preliminary group.

=== Group III ===
Pos	Team	Pld	W	D	L	GF	GA	GD	Pts	Qualification
1	Germany	3	3	0	0	94	76	+18	6	9–12th place semifinals
2	Netherlands	3	2	0	1	91	81	+10	4	9–12th place semifinals
3	Iceland	3	1	0	2	91	89	+2	2	13–16th place semifinals
4	Croatia	3	0	0	3	73	103	−30	0	13–16th place semifinals

Source: EHF
Rules for classification: 1) points; 2) head-to-head points; 3) head-to-head goal difference; 4) head-to-head number of goals scored; 5) goal difference.

11 July 2023; 13:00	Iceland	26–32	Netherlands	Pitești Arena, Pitești; Attendance: 243; Referees: Duplîi, Pobedrina (UKR)
11 July 2023; 13:00	Ágústsdóttir 7	(12–16)	Loy 8	Pitești Arena, Pitești; Attendance: 243; Referees: Duplîi, Pobedrina (UKR)
11 July 2023; 13:00	6× (suspension)	Report	1× (suspension)	Pitești Arena, Pitești; Attendance: 243; Referees: Duplîi, Pobedrina (UKR)

11 July 2023; 15:15	Germany	34–21	Croatia	Pitești Arena, Pitești; Attendance: 200; Referees: Kull, Tint (EST)
11 July 2023; 15:15	Däuble 6	(10–12)	Kosovac 7	Pitești Arena, Pitești; Attendance: 200; Referees: Kull, Tint (EST)
11 July 2023; 15:15	2× (suspension)	Report	6× (suspension)	Pitești Arena, Pitești; Attendance: 200; Referees: Kull, Tint (EST)

12 July 2023; 13:00	Croatia	26 – 35	Iceland	Pitești Arena, Pitești; Attendance: 125; Referees: Christidi, Papamattheou (GRE)
12 July 2023; 13:00	Perić 8	(14–18)	Ásmundsdóttir 10	Pitești Arena, Pitești; Attendance: 125; Referees: Christidi, Papamattheou (GRE)
12 July 2023; 13:00	1× (yellow card) 7× (suspension) 1× (red card)	Report	2× (yellow card) 2× (suspension)	Pitești Arena, Pitești; Attendance: 125; Referees: Christidi, Papamattheou (GRE)

12 July 2023; 15:15	Netherlands	25–29	Germany	Pitești Arena, Pitești; Attendance: 250; Referees: Manea, Iliescu (ROU)
12 July 2023; 15:15	Luchies 7	(13–16)	Terfloth 7	Pitești Arena, Pitești; Attendance: 250; Referees: Manea, Iliescu (ROU)
12 July 2023; 15:15	5× (suspension)	Report	1× (yellow card) 2× (suspension)	Pitești Arena, Pitești; Attendance: 250; Referees: Manea, Iliescu (ROU)

=== Group IV ===
Pos	Team	Pld	W	D	L	GF	GA	GD	Pts	Qualification
1	Czech Republic	3	2	1	0	79	66	+13	5	9–12th place semifinals
2	Norway	3	2	0	1	79	80	−1	4	9–12th place semifinals
3	Serbia	3	1	1	1	75	65	+10	3	13–16th place semifinals
4	North Macedonia	3	0	0	3	66	88	−22	0	13–16th place semifinals

Source: EHF
Rules for classification: 1) points; 2) head-to-head points; 3) head-to-head goal difference; 4) head-to-head number of goals scored; 5) goal difference.

11 July 2023; 13:00	North Macedonia	23–29	Norway	Sports Hall, Mioveni; Attendance: 180; Referees: Manea, Iliescu (ROU)
11 July 2023; 13:00	Jankulovska 9	(11–9)	Grønstad 6	Sports Hall, Mioveni; Attendance: 180; Referees: Manea, Iliescu (ROU)
11 July 2023; 13:00	1× (yellow card) 4× (suspension)	Report	1× (yellow card) 4× (suspension)	Sports Hall, Mioveni; Attendance: 180; Referees: Manea, Iliescu (ROU)

11 July 2023; 15:15	Czech Republic	19–19	Serbia	Sports Hall, Mioveni; Attendance: 200; Referees: Simone, Monitillo (ITA)
11 July 2023; 15:15	Vávrová 8	(8–14)	Fajfrić 5	Sports Hall, Mioveni; Attendance: 200; Referees: Simone, Monitillo (ITA)
11 July 2023; 15:15	1× (yellow card) 4× (suspension)	Report	1× (yellow card) 5× (suspension)	Sports Hall, Mioveni; Attendance: 200; Referees: Simone, Monitillo (ITA)

12 July 2023; 13:00	Serbia	30–19	North Macedonia	Sports Hall, Mioveni; Attendance: 200; Referees: Barysas, Petrušis (LTU)
12 July 2023; 13:00	Todorovski 8	(14–8)	Nestoroska 5	Sports Hall, Mioveni; Attendance: 200; Referees: Barysas, Petrušis (LTU)
12 July 2023; 13:00	4× (suspension)	Report	5× (suspension)	Sports Hall, Mioveni; Attendance: 200; Referees: Barysas, Petrušis (LTU)

12 July 2023; 15:15	Norway	23–31	Czech Republic	Sports Hall, Mioveni; Attendance: 157; Referees: Kull, Tint (EST)
12 July 2023; 15:15	Hedenstad 6	(8–18)	Vávrová 9	Sports Hall, Mioveni; Attendance: 157; Referees: Kull, Tint (EST)
12 July 2023; 15:15	7× (suspension) 1× (red card)	Report	3× (suspension)	Sports Hall, Mioveni; Attendance: 157; Referees: Kull, Tint (EST)

== Main round ==
The main groups were numbered I and II. The teams that qualified for this phase retained their points and goal difference in the games played against teams from the same preliminary group.

=== Group I ===
Pos	Team	Pld	W	D	L	GF	GA	GD	Pts	Qualification
1	Portugal	3	3	0	0	104	78	+26	6	Semifinals
2	Romania	3	2	0	1	108	111	−3	4	Semifinals
3	Sweden	3	1	0	2	92	103	−11	2	5–8th place semifinals
4	Switzerland	3	0	0	3	97	109	−12	0	5–8th place semifinals

Source: EHF
Rules for classification: 1) points; 2) head-to-head points; 3) head-to-head goal difference; 4) head-to-head number of goals scored; 5) goal difference.

11 July 2023; 17:30	Romania	42–34	Sweden	Pitești Arena, Pitești; Attendance: 2,000; Referees: Jović, Arnautović (BIH)
11 July 2023; 17:30	Boiciuc 11	(19–16)	Mihailovic 7	Pitești Arena, Pitești; Attendance: 2,000; Referees: Jović, Arnautović (BIH)
11 July 2023; 17:30	2× (suspension)	Report	1× (yellow card) 5× (suspension)	Pitești Arena, Pitești; Attendance: 2,000; Referees: Jović, Arnautović (BIH)

11 July 2023; 19:45	Portugal	38–25	Switzerland	Pitești Arena, Pitești; Attendance: 340; Referees: Ivanović, Vujisić (MNE)
11 July 2023; 19:45	Sequeira 8	(20–12)	Emmenegger, Lauper, Snedkerud 4	Pitești Arena, Pitești; Attendance: 340; Referees: Ivanović, Vujisić (MNE)
11 July 2023; 19:45	1× (yellow card) 6× (suspension)	Report	2× (yellow card) 1× (suspension)	Pitești Arena, Pitești; Attendance: 340; Referees: Ivanović, Vujisić (MNE)

12 July 2023; 17:30	Sweden	23–30	Portugal	Pitești Arena, Pitești; Attendance: 300; Referees: Sîrbu, Serdiuc (MDA)
12 July 2023; 17:30	Wallin 6	(14–14)	Rebelo 7	Pitești Arena, Pitești; Attendance: 300; Referees: Sîrbu, Serdiuc (MDA)
12 July 2023; 17:30	1× (yellow card) 3× (suspension)	Report	2× (suspension)	Pitești Arena, Pitești; Attendance: 300; Referees: Sîrbu, Serdiuc (MDA)

12 July 2023; 19:45	Switzerland	36–41	Romania	Pitești Arena, Pitești; Attendance: 2,400; Referees: Ivanović, Vujisić (MNE)
12 July 2023; 19:45	Emmenegger 9	(20–21)	Lixăndroiu 10	Pitești Arena, Pitești; Attendance: 2,400; Referees: Ivanović, Vujisić (MNE)
12 July 2023; 19:45	4× (suspension)	Report	4× (suspension)	Pitești Arena, Pitești; Attendance: 2,400; Referees: Ivanović, Vujisić (MNE)

=== Group II ===
Pos	Team	Pld	W	D	L	GF	GA	GD	Pts	Qualification
1	Hungary	3	3	0	0	99	77	+22	6	Semifinals
2	Denmark	3	1	1	1	82	99	−17	3	Semifinals
3	France	3	1	0	2	91	91	0	2	5–8th place semifinals
4	Montenegro	3	0	1	2	85	90	−5	1	5–8th place semifinals

Source: EHF
Rules for classification: 1) points; 2) head-to-head points; 3) head-to-head goal difference; 4) head-to-head number of goals scored; 5) goal difference.

11 July 2023; 17:30	Montenegro	25–28	Hungary	Sports Hall, Mioveni; Attendance: 250; Referees: Sîrbu, Serdiuc (MDA)
11 July 2023; 17:30	Marković 7	(13–14)	Csernyánszki 10	Sports Hall, Mioveni; Attendance: 250; Referees: Sîrbu, Serdiuc (MDA)
11 July 2023; 17:30	1× (yellow card) 5× (suspension)	Report	1× (yellow card) 4× (suspension)	Sports Hall, Mioveni; Attendance: 250; Referees: Sîrbu, Serdiuc (MDA)

11 July 2023; 19:45	Denmark	30–29	France	Sports Hall, Mioveni; Attendance: 250; Referees: Barysas, Petrušis (LTU)
11 July 2023; 19:45	Scaglione 11	(10–15)	E. Borg 12	Sports Hall, Mioveni; Attendance: 250; Referees: Barysas, Petrušis (LTU)
11 July 2023; 19:45	4× (suspension)	Report	1× (yellow card) 4× (suspension)	Sports Hall, Mioveni; Attendance: 250; Referees: Barysas, Petrušis (LTU)

12 July 2023; 17:30	France	33–31	Montenegro	Sports Hall, Mioveni; Attendance: 230; Referees: Simone, Monitillo (ITA)
12 July 2023; 17:30	Sissoko 9	(19–14)	Vukčević 9	Sports Hall, Mioveni; Attendance: 230; Referees: Simone, Monitillo (ITA)
12 July 2023; 17:30	4× (suspension)	Report	4× (suspension)	Sports Hall, Mioveni; Attendance: 230; Referees: Simone, Monitillo (ITA)

12 July 2023; 19:45	Hungary	41–23	Denmark	Sports Hall, Mioveni; Attendance: 150; Referees: Jović, Arnautović (BIH)
12 July 2023; 19:45	Csíkos 6	(23–13)	Bang, Scaglione 5	Sports Hall, Mioveni; Attendance: 150; Referees: Jović, Arnautović (BIH)
12 July 2023; 19:45	5× (suspension)	Report	4× (suspension)	Sports Hall, Mioveni; Attendance: 150; Referees: Jović, Arnautović (BIH)

== Placement round ==
=== 13th place bracket ===
13–16th place semifinals
14 July
Iceland	35
North Macedonia	29
14 July
Serbia	31
Croatia	26

13th place
15 July
Iceland	33
Serbia	22
15th place
15 July
North Macedonia	31
Croatia	26

14 July 2023; 13:00	Iceland	35–29	North Macedonia	Sports Hall, Mioveni; Attendance: 150; Referees: Simone, Monitillo (ITA)
14 July 2023; 13:00	Ágústsdóttir 11	(20–15)	Trpeska 6	Sports Hall, Mioveni; Attendance: 150; Referees: Simone, Monitillo (ITA)
14 July 2023; 13:00	7× (yellow card) 6× (suspension)	Report	7× (suspension)	Sports Hall, Mioveni; Attendance: 150; Referees: Simone, Monitillo (ITA)

14 July 2023; 15:15	Serbia	31–26	Croatia	Sports Hall, Mioveni; Attendance: 160; Referees: Sîrbu, Serdiuc (MDA)
14 July 2023; 15:15	Mandić 7	(11–12)	Pleša 9	Sports Hall, Mioveni; Attendance: 160; Referees: Sîrbu, Serdiuc (MDA)
14 July 2023; 15:15	5× (suspension) 1× (red card)	Report	5× (suspension)	Sports Hall, Mioveni; Attendance: 160; Referees: Sîrbu, Serdiuc (MDA)

=== 15th place game ===
15 July 2023; 13:00	North Macedonia	31–26	Croatia	Sports Hall, Mioveni; Attendance: 125; Referees: Duplîi, Pobedrina (UKR)
15 July 2023; 13:00	Rizoska 9	(18–8)	Gavrilović, Zrilić 7	Sports Hall, Mioveni; Attendance: 125; Referees: Duplîi, Pobedrina (UKR)
15 July 2023; 13:00	7× (suspension) 1× (red card)	Report	6× (suspension)	Sports Hall, Mioveni; Attendance: 125; Referees: Duplîi, Pobedrina (UKR)

=== 13th place game ===
15 July 2023; 15:15	Iceland	33–22	Serbia	Sports Hall, Mioveni; Attendance: 80; Referees: Barysas, Petrušis (LTU)
15 July 2023; 15:15	Ágústsdóttir 9	(16–10)	Mandić, Vasić 7	Sports Hall, Mioveni; Attendance: 80; Referees: Barysas, Petrušis (LTU)
15 July 2023; 15:15	1× (yellow card) 6× (suspension)	Report	5× (suspension)	Sports Hall, Mioveni; Attendance: 80; Referees: Barysas, Petrušis (LTU)

=== Ninth place bracket ===
9–12th place semifinals
14 July
Germany	23
Norway	24
14 July
Czech Republic	21
Netherlands	28

Ninth place
15 July
Norway	13
Netherlands	27
Eleventh place
15 July
Germany	36
Czech Republic	22

14 July 2023; 17:30	Germany	23–24	Norway	Sports Hall, Mioveni; Attendance: 200; Referees: Christidi, Papamattheou (GRE)
14 July 2023; 17:30	Gaubatz 6	(11–10)	Hedenstad 5	Sports Hall, Mioveni; Attendance: 200; Referees: Christidi, Papamattheou (GRE)
14 July 2023; 17:30	2× (suspension)	Report	1× (yellow card) 1× (suspension)	Sports Hall, Mioveni; Attendance: 200; Referees: Christidi, Papamattheou (GRE)

14 July 2023; 19:45	Czech Republic	21–28	Netherlands	Sports Hall, Mioveni; Attendance: 122; Referees: Duplîi, Pobedrina (UKR)
14 July 2023; 19:45	Gabrhelová, Vávrová 4	(10–17)	Bakker, Van Vliet 6	Sports Hall, Mioveni; Attendance: 122; Referees: Duplîi, Pobedrina (UKR)
14 July 2023; 19:45	2× (yellow card) 4× (suspension)	Report	1× (yellow card) 6× (suspension)	Sports Hall, Mioveni; Attendance: 122; Referees: Duplîi, Pobedrina (UKR)

=== Eleventh place game ===
15 July 2023; 17:30	Germany	36–22	Czech Republic	Sports Hall, Mioveni; Attendance: 150; Referees: Kull, Tint (EST)
15 July 2023; 17:30	Wipper 8	(14–11)	Schreibmeierová 5	Sports Hall, Mioveni; Attendance: 150; Referees: Kull, Tint (EST)
15 July 2023; 17:30	1× (yellow card) 7× (suspension) 1× (red card)	Report	6× (suspension)	Sports Hall, Mioveni; Attendance: 150; Referees: Kull, Tint (EST)

=== Ninth place game ===
15 July 2023; 19:45	Norway	13–27	Netherlands	Sports Hall, Mioveni; Attendance: 100; Referees: Sîrbu, Serdiuc (MDA)
15 July 2023; 19:45	Spone 4	(5–14)	Van Maurik 10	Sports Hall, Mioveni; Attendance: 100; Referees: Sîrbu, Serdiuc (MDA)
15 July 2023; 19:45	3× (suspension)	Report	2× (yellow card) 4× (suspension) 1× (red card)	Sports Hall, Mioveni; Attendance: 100; Referees: Sîrbu, Serdiuc (MDA)

=== Fifth place bracket ===
5–8th place semifinals
14 July
Sweden	30
Montenegro	28
14 July
France	38
Switzerland	29

Fifth place
15 July
Sweden	29
France	25
Seventh place
15 July
Montenegro	32
Switzerland	37

14 July 2023; 13:00	Sweden	30–28	Montenegro	Pitești Arena, Pitești; Attendance: 150; Referees: Manea, Iliescu (ROU)
14 July 2023; 13:00	Mihailovic 6	(16–14)	Milošević, Vujadinović, Vukčević 6	Pitești Arena, Pitești; Attendance: 150; Referees: Manea, Iliescu (ROU)
14 July 2023; 13:00	4× (suspension)	Report	3× (suspension)	Pitești Arena, Pitești; Attendance: 150; Referees: Manea, Iliescu (ROU)

14 July 2023; 15:15	France	38–29	Switzerland	Pitești Arena, Pitești; Attendance: 100; Referees: Kull, Tint (EST)
14 July 2023; 15:15	Perret, Texier 6	(17–16)	Meier 8	Pitești Arena, Pitești; Attendance: 100; Referees: Kull, Tint (EST)
14 July 2023; 15:15	1× (yellow card) 5× (suspension)	Report	1× (yellow card) 6× (suspension)	Pitești Arena, Pitești; Attendance: 100; Referees: Kull, Tint (EST)

=== Seventh place game ===
16 July 2023; 13:00	Montenegro	32–37	Switzerland	Pitești Arena, Pitești; Attendance: 150; Referees: Duplîi, Pobedrina (UKR)
16 July 2023; 13:00	Marković 9	(16–18)	Riner 8	Pitești Arena, Pitești; Attendance: 150; Referees: Duplîi, Pobedrina (UKR)
16 July 2023; 13:00	1× (yellow card) 4× (suspension)	Report	2× (yellow card) 5× (suspension)	Pitești Arena, Pitești; Attendance: 150; Referees: Duplîi, Pobedrina (UKR)

=== Fifth place game ===
16 July 2023; 15:15	Sweden	29–25	France	Pitești Arena, Pitești; Attendance: 800; Referees: Sîrbu, Serdiuc (MDA)
16 July 2023; 15:15	Landberg, Wallin, Wiksfors 5	(15–9)	Texier 6	Pitești Arena, Pitești; Attendance: 800; Referees: Sîrbu, Serdiuc (MDA)
16 July 2023; 15:15		Report	1× (suspension)	Pitești Arena, Pitești; Attendance: 800; Referees: Sîrbu, Serdiuc (MDA)

== Knockout stage ==
Semifinals
14 July
Portugal	35
Denmark	38
14 July
Hungary	34
Romania	26

Final
16 July
Denmark	26
Hungary	35
Third place
16 July
Portugal	32
Romania	39

=== Semifinals ===
14 July 2023; 17:30	Portugal	35–38	Denmark	Pitești Arena, Pitești; Attendance: 800; Referees: Barysas, Petrušis (LTU)
14 July 2023; 17:30	Rebelo 14	(19–16)	Scaglione 9	Pitești Arena, Pitești; Attendance: 800; Referees: Barysas, Petrušis (LTU)
14 July 2023; 17:30	1× (yellow card) 3× (suspension)	Report	1× (yellow card) 2× (suspension)	Pitești Arena, Pitești; Attendance: 800; Referees: Barysas, Petrušis (LTU)

14 July 2023; 19:45	Hungary	34–26	Romania	Pitești Arena, Pitești; Attendance: 3,500; Referees: Jović, Arnautović (BIH)
14 July 2023; 19:45	Csíkos, Simon 7	(18–16)	Boiciuc 9	Pitești Arena, Pitești; Attendance: 3,500; Referees: Jović, Arnautović (BIH)
14 July 2023; 19:45	6× (suspension)	Report	4× (suspension)	Pitești Arena, Pitești; Attendance: 3,500; Referees: Jović, Arnautović (BIH)

=== Third place game ===
16 July 2023; 17:30	Portugal	32–39	Romania	Pitești Arena, Pitești; Attendance: 2,210; Referees: Ivanović, Vujisić (MNE)
16 July 2023; 17:30	Sequeira 8	(13–18)	Boiciuc, Lixăndroiu 8	Pitești Arena, Pitești; Attendance: 2,210; Referees: Ivanović, Vujisić (MNE)
16 July 2023; 17:30	2× (yellow card) 7× (suspension)	Report	6× (suspension)	Pitești Arena, Pitești; Attendance: 2,210; Referees: Ivanović, Vujisić (MNE)

=== Final ===
16 July 2023; 19:45	Denmark	26–35	Hungary	Pitești Arena, Pitești; Attendance: 2,500; Referees: Jović, Arnautović (BIH)
16 July 2023; 19:45	Scaglione 11	(17–14)	Varga 11	Pitești Arena, Pitești; Attendance: 2,500; Referees: Jović, Arnautović (BIH)
16 July 2023; 19:45	2× (yellow card) 3× (suspension)	Report	2× (yellow card) 3× (suspension)	Pitești Arena, Pitești; Attendance: 2,500; Referees: Jović, Arnautović (BIH)

== Final ranking and awards ==
=== Final ranking ===
There was no relegation as the event will be expanded from 2025 onwards to 24 teams.

Rank	Team
1st place, gold medalist(s)	Hungary
2nd place, silver medalist(s)	Denmark
3rd place, bronze medalist(s)	Romania
4	Portugal
5	Sweden
6	France
7	Switzerland
8	Montenegro
9	Netherlands
10	Norway
11	Germany
12	Czech Republic
13	Iceland
14	Serbia
15	North Macedonia
16	Croatia

Qualified for the 2024 Women's Junior World Handball Championship
Qualified for the 2024 Women's Junior World Handball Championship as hosts.

=== All Star Team ===
The All Star Team and awards were announced on 16 July 2023.

Position	Player
Goalkeeper	(Hungary) Klára Zaj
Left wing	(Denmark) Matilde Vestergaard
Left back	(Denmark) Julie Scaglione
Centre back	(Hungary) Petra Simon
Right back	(Portugal) Luciana Rebelo
Right wing	(Romania) Mihaela Mihai
Pivot	(Montenegro) Andrea Brajović
Best defense player	(France) Fatou Karamoko
Most valuable player	(Hungary) Petra Simon

=== Top goalscorers ===
Rank	Name	Goals
1	(Denmark) Julie Scaglione	68
2	(Portugal) Luciana Rebelo	62
3	(Romania) Alisia Boiciuc	53
4	(Romania) Diana Lixăndroiu	51
5	(Iceland) Lilja Ágústsdóttir	48
6	(Montenegro) Jelena Vukčević	47
7	(Switzerland) Mia Emmenegger	46
7	(Serbia) Tamara Mandić	46
7	(Hungary) Petra Simon	46
7	(Croatia) Iva Zrilić	46

== See also ==
- 2023 European Women's U-17 Handball Championship
