= Eredivisie (disambiguation) =

Eredivisie, literally translated to English as Honorary Division, refers to the top level of competition in Netherlands in a number of sports, most commonly association football. Professional sport leagues that utilize the title include:

- Eredivisie, the men's association football league.
  - Beloften Eredivisie, the men's association football reserve league
- Eredivisie (basketball), former name for men's basketball league, which is now known even in Dutch by the English-language name of Dutch Basketball League.
- Eredivisie (women), the women's association football league.
- Eredivisie (women's handball), the women's handball league.
- Eredivisie (men's handball), the men's handball league.
- Eredivisie (ice hockey), the men's ice hockey league.
