= Rachel de Haze =

Dutch handball player (born 1991)

Personal information
- Full name: Rachel de Haze
- Nationality: Dutch
- Born: 29 January 1991 (age 35) Amsterdam, Netherlands
- Height: 1.63 m (5 ft 4 in)

Sport
- Sport: Handball
- Position: Left back
- Current club: VOC Amsterdam
- Number: 10

Youth career
- Years: Team
- –: VOC Amsterdam

Senior clubs
- Years: Team
- 2008–2009: Quintus
- 2009–2020: VOC Amsterdam
National team
Years	Team	Apps	(Gls)
2009–	Netherlands	11	(5)
Medal record
EHF Youth European Championship
Bronze medal – third place	2007 Slovakia

Rachel de Haze (born 29 January 1991) is a former Dutch handballer who played for Succes Schoonmaak/VOC Amsterdam, from 2009 to 2020.

== Achievements ==
- Dutch Division:
  - Winner: 2010, 2017, 2018, 2019
- Dutch Cup:
  - Winner: 2010, 2016
- Dutch Supercup:
  - Winner: 2010, 2016
- EHF Youth European Championship:
  - Bronze Medalist: 2007

== Personal life ==
She is the granddaughter of former football player and manager Rinus Israël.
