= Boline Laursen =

Danish handball player (born 2005)

Personal information
- Full name: Boline Haugaard Laursen
- Nationality: Danish
- Born: 13 September 2005 (age 21) Skanderborg, Denmark
- Height: 1.88 m (6 ft 2 in)

Sport
- Sport: Handball
- Position: Pivot
- Current club: Silkeborg-Voel KFUM
- Number: 23

Youth career
- Years: Team
- 2011-2024: Skanderborg Håndbold

Senior clubs
- Years: Team
- 2024-2025: Skanderborg Håndbold
- 2025-: Silkeborg-Voel KFUM
Medal record
Youth World Championship
Silver medal – second place	2022 North Macedonia
Junior European Championship
Silver medal – second place	2023 Romania

Boline Haugaard Laursen (born 13 September 2005) is a Danish handball player for Silkeborg-Voel KFUM in the Damehåndboldligaen.

Laursen represented the Danish junior national team at the 2022 IHF Women's U18 Handball World Championship in North Macedonia and at the 2023 European Women's U-19 Handball Championship in Romania, winning silver both times.

On 21 January 2025, it was announced that she signed a two-year contract with Silkeborg-Voel KFUM. In April 2025, she was awarded Youth Player of the Year 2024/25 by Håndbold Spiller Foreningen.

== Achievements ==
- Youth World Championship:
  - Silver Medalist: 2022
- Junior European Championship:
  - Silver Medalist: 2023

== Individual awards ==
- Youth Player of the Year 2024–25 Damehåndboldligaen.
