= NILOC Amsterdam =

Dutch sports club

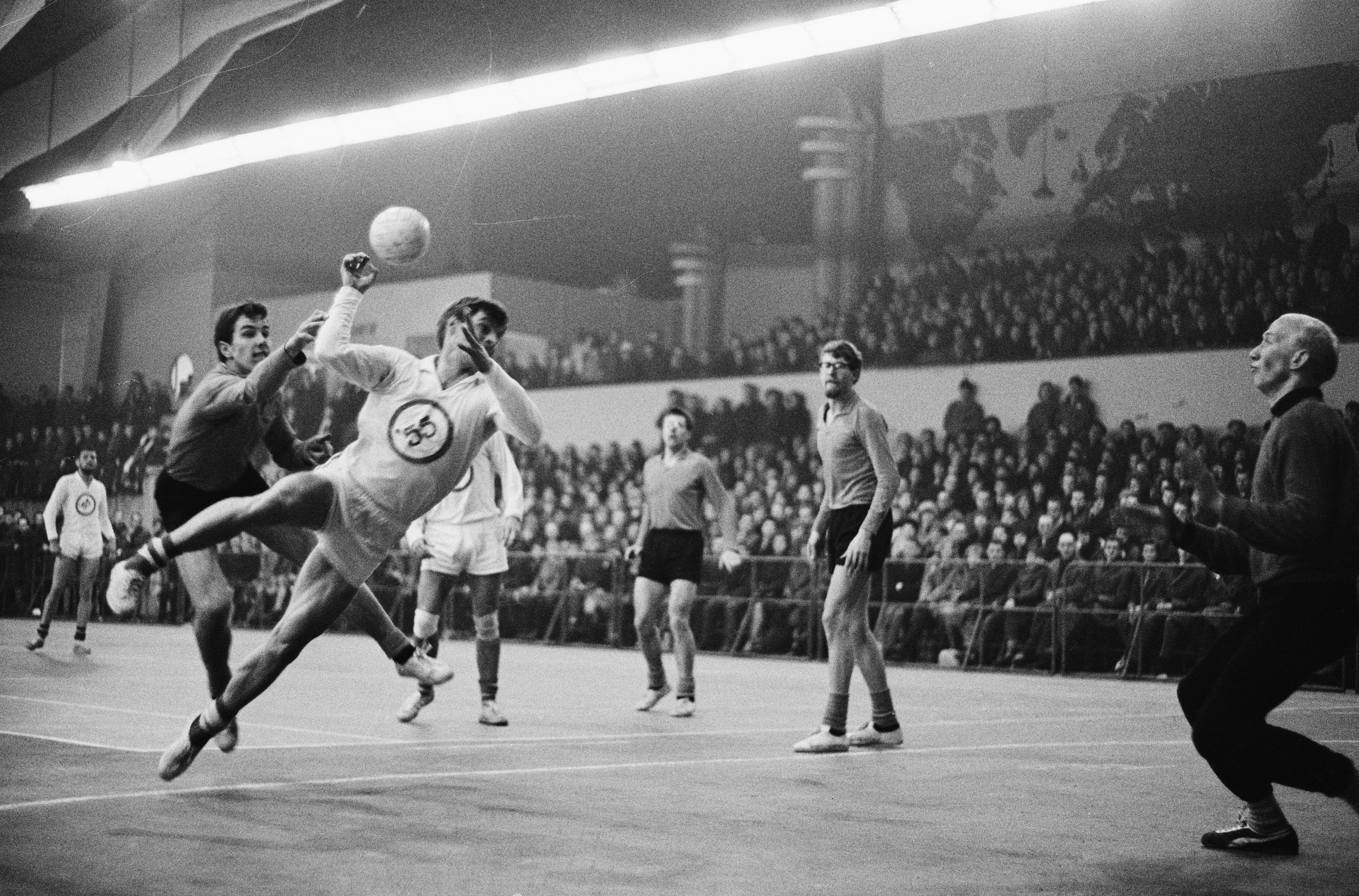
Match between NILOC Amsterdam and Operatie 55 in 1965.

Nederlands Instituut Lichamelijke Opvoedkunde Club, a.k.a. NILOC Amsterdam, was a sports club from Amsterdam best known for its handball section. The women's team won seven national championships between 1956 and 1984 and it was the first team to represent the Netherlands in the European Cup in 1963. In 1973 it reached the competition's semifinals. The club was disestablished in the 1990s.

== Titles ==
- Women
  - Eredivisie
    - 1956, 1962, 1968, 1971, 1972, 1983, 1984
  - Dutch Cup
    - 1983, 1984
