= HV Swift Roermond =

Dutch handball club

- Full name: Swift Roermond
- Short name: Swift
- Founded: 1 September 1947
- Dissolved: 21 September 2000
- Club colours

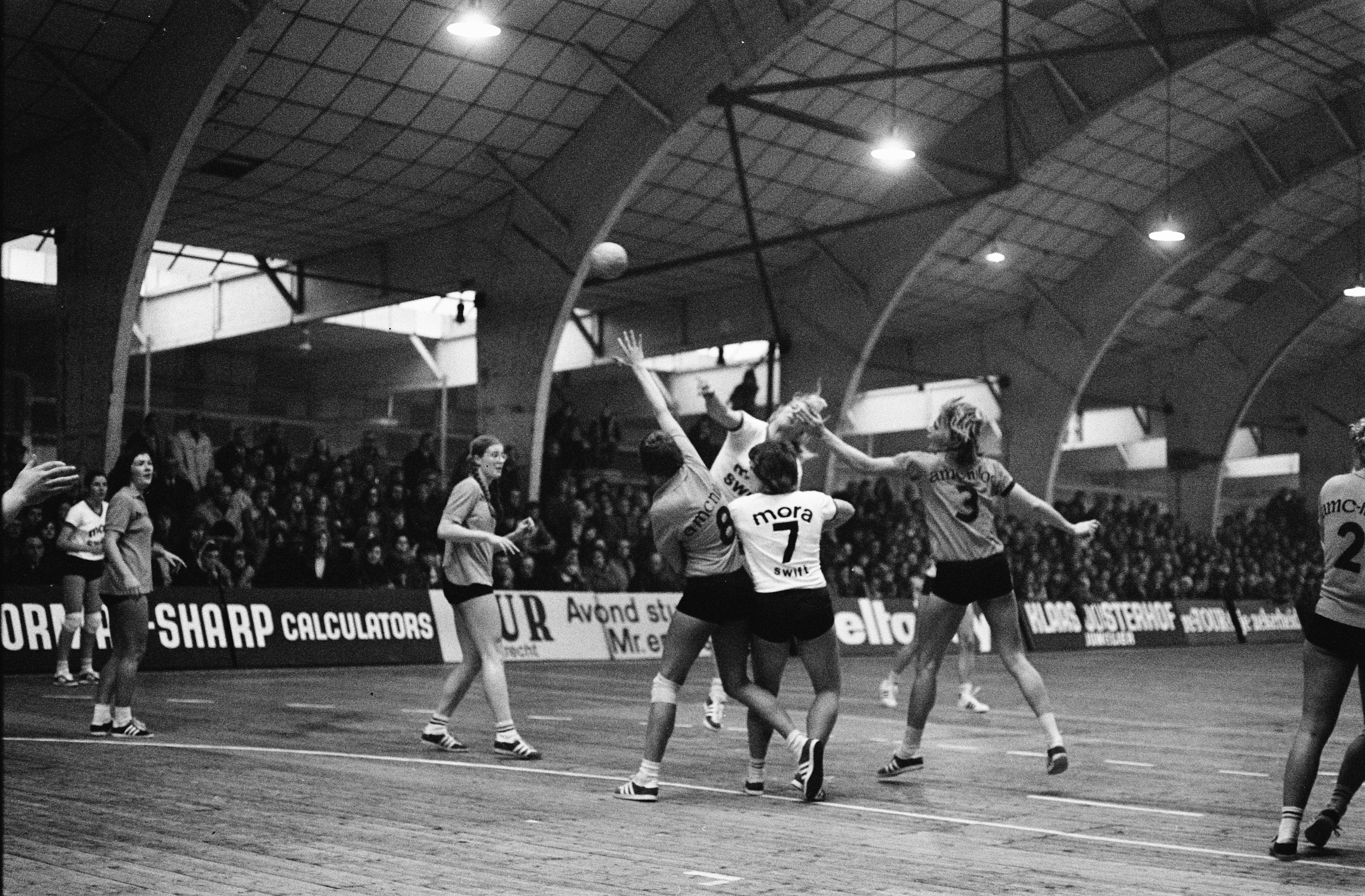
Niloc against Swift (10-11) at Oude RAI in Amsterdam. (1974)

Swift Roermond is a former Dutch handball club from Roermond. Its women's team was the most successful team in the Dutch Championship with 19 championships between 1963 and 1998, and it reached the European Cup's final in 1976. It remains the only Dutch team that has achieved this to date. The 1980s were mostly unsuccessful for the club, but in the 1990s it won a record seven titles in a row, becoming a regular of the new Champions League.

The chosen professional path, which attracted many foreign players, turned out to be dead-end. This led to establishing a new handball club S2000 by a number of former players of Swift Roermond. Many players flowed and also started to join S2000. Eventually, on 21 September 2000, the club ceased to exist.

== Titles ==
- Women
  - Eredivisie
    - 1963, 1964, 1965, 1966, 1967, 1969, 1970, 1973, 1974, 1975, 1979, 1982, 1992, 1993, 1994, 1995, 1996, 1997, 1998
  - Dutch Cup
    - 1992, 1993, 1994, 1995, 1996, 1997
