= Iva Zrilić =

Croatian handballer (born 2004)

Personal information
- Nationality: Croatian
- Born: 13 October 2004 (age 22) Rijeka, Croatia
- Height: 1.66 m (5 ft 5 in)

Sport
- Sport: Handball
- Position: Centre back
- Current club: RK Lokomotiva Zagreb
- Number: 44
National team
Years	Team	Apps	(Gls)
2024–	Croatia	24	(14)
- Updated on 29 October 2026

Iva Zrilić (born 13 October 2004) is a Croatian handballer for RK Lokomotiva Zagreb and the Croatian national team.

She represented Croatia at the 2024 European Women's Handball Championship and at the 2025 World Women's Handball Championship.

She hails from Senj.
