= VOC Amsterdam =

- Full name: Volewijckers-Oriënto-Combinatie Amsterdam
- Short name: VOC
- Founded: June 7, 2006; 20 years ago
- Arena: Sportshal Elzenhagen
- Capacity: 750
- President: Andre Zeldenthuis
- Head coach: Ricardo Clarijs
- League: AFAB Eredivisie
- 2025-26: 1st
- Club colours
| Home | Away |

Location of VOC Amsterdam

OTTO Work Force/VOC Amsterdam is a women's handball club from Amsterdam-Noord in Netherlands that competes in the AFAB Eredivisie. They play their home matches in Sportshal Elzenhagen, which have capacity for 750 spectators. They usually play in green shirts and black shorts. It was founded on 7 June 2006. Since the 2000's they have been one of the best teams in the Netherlands, winning 8 Championships since 2000.

== Honours ==
- AFAB Eredivisie
  - Winners (8) : 2000, 2008, 2009, 2010, 2017, 2018, 2019, 2023, 2026
- Dutch Cup
  - Winners (4) : 2005, 2009, 2010, 2016
- Dutch Supercup
  - Winners (3) : 2008, 2010, 2016

== Arena ==
- Arena: Sportshal Elzenhagen
- City: Amsterdam-Noord
- Capacity: 750
- Address: JH Hisgenpad 1, 1025 WK Amsterdam

== Team ==
=== Current squad ===
Squad for the 2019-20 season.

Goalkeepers

- 1 (Netherlands) Cajune Calmez
- 12 (Netherlands) Marit Huiberts

Field

- 3 (Netherlands) Kaylee Romer
- 4 (Netherlands) Nikita van der Vliet
- 6 (Netherlands) Britt van der Baan
- 7 (Netherlands) Sharon Bouter
- 8 (Netherlands) Zola Amsen
- 10 (Netherlands) Rachel de Haze
- 11 (Netherlands) Maxime Drent
- 14 (Netherlands) Lindsey Schrekker
- 15 (Netherlands) Kim Lunter
- 16 (Netherlands) Zoe Sprengers
- 18 (Netherlands) Zara Zeldenthuis
- 19 (Netherlands) Lotte Visser
- 20 (Netherlands) Demy Worst
- 22 (Netherlands) Jessy Breugem
- 23 (Netherlands) Isa Ternede
- 24 (Netherlands) Kelsey van der Elst
- 25 (Netherlands) Beau de Boer
- 26 (Netherlands) Kirsten Theron
- 27 (Netherlands) Bente Goeman
- 28 (Netherlands) Eva van Diepen
- 30 (Netherlands) Tatum van Vliet
- 31 (Netherlands) Noah van der Heide

=== Transfers ===
Transfers for the 2020-21 season

Joining

- (Netherlands) Michelle Goos (LW) (from (Germany) Neckarsulmer SU)

Leaving

- (Netherlands) Nikita van der Vliet (P) (to (Denmark) Nykøbing Falster Håndboldklub)
- (Netherlands) Zoë Sprengers (LW) (to (Germany) Bayer Leverkusen)
- (Netherlands) Rachel de Haze (LW) (Retires)

== Former players ==
- (Netherlands) Estavana Polman
- (Netherlands) Yvette Broch
- (Netherlands) Tess Wester
- (Netherlands) Laura van der Heijden
- (Netherlands) Debbie Bont
- (Netherlands) Angela Malestein
- (Netherlands) Michelle Goos
- (Netherlands) Charris Rozemalen
- (Netherlands) Dione Housheer
- (Netherlands) Bo van Wetering
- (Netherlands) Rachel de Haze
- (Netherlands) Nikita van der Vliet
- (Netherlands) Zoë Sprengers
- (Netherlands) Tamara Haggerty
- (Netherlands) Judith van der Helm
- (Netherlands) Romée Maarschalkerweerd
