= Matilde Vestergaard =

Danish handball player (born 1998)

Personal information
- Full name: Matilde Marie Vestergaard
- Nationality: Danish
- Born: 11 September 2004 (age 22) Fredericia, Denmark
- Height: 1.64 m (5 ft 5 in)

Sport
- Sport: Handball
- Position: Left wing
- Current club: Odense Håndbold
- Number: 17

Youth career
- Years: Team
- 2020-2023: HH Elite

Senior clubs
- Years: Team
- 2023-2025: Nykøbing Falster Håndboldklub
- 2025-2026: HH Elite
- 2026-: Odense Håndbold
Medal record
Youth World Championship
Silver medal – second place	2022 North Macedonia
Junior European Championship
Silver medal – second place	2023 Romania

Matilde Marie Vestergaard (born 11 September 2004) is a Danish handball player for Odense Håndbold in the Damehåndboldligaen.

Vestergaard represented the Danish junior national team in the 2023 European Women's U-19 Handball Championship in Romania, winning silver. She was also included in the official All-Star team of the tournament as best left wing.

On 3 January 2023, it was announced that she signed a three-year contract with Nykøbing Falster Håndboldklub. In August 2025, she returned to HH Elite. In July 2026, Vestergaard was announced as a replacement for Anna Grundtvig in Odense Håndbold, who announced her pregnancy a few days before. She signed a one-year contract at the Danish top-division club.

== Achievements ==
- Youth World Championship:
  - Silver Medalist: 2022
- Junior European Championship:
  - Silver Medalist: 2023

== Individual awards ==
- Best left wing of the 2023 European Women's U-19 Handball Championship
