= Luca Csíkos =

Hungarian handball player (born 2005)

Personal information
- Nationality: Hungarian
- Born: 25 February 2005 (age 21) Keszthely, Hungary
- Height: 1.80 m (5 ft 11 in)

Sport
- Sport: Handball
- Position: Left back
- Current club: Thüringer HC
- Number: 5

Youth career
- Years: Team
- 2014–2015: Hévízi SK
- 2015: Vonyarcvashegy SE
- 2015–2016: Marcali VSZSE
- 2016–2018: Vonyarcvashegy SE
- 2018–2020: NEKA

Senior clubs
- Years: Team
- 2020–2023: NEKA
- 2023–2026: Váci NKSE
- 2026–: Ferencvárosi TC
- 2026–2028: → Thüringer HC (loan)
National team
Years	Team	Apps	(Gls)
2024–	Hungary	14	(20)
Medal record
European Championship
Bronze medal – third place	2024 Austria/Hungary/Switzerland
Junior European Championship
Gold medal – first place	2023 Romania
Youth European Championship
Gold medal – first place	2021 Montenegro
Junior World Championship
Silver medal – second place	2024 North Macedonia
Youth World Championships
Bronze medal – third place	2022 North Macedonia
- Updated on 10 December 2025

Luca Csíkos (born 25 February 2005) is a Hungarian handballer for Thüringer HC and the Hungarian national team.

== Career ==
=== Club ===
Csíkos started her career at Hévízi SK. She also played in the teams of Marcali VSZSE and Vonyarcvashegy SE. In the summer of 2018, she joined the National Handball Academy (NEKA) team. From 2020, in addition to the youth championship, she also played a role in the adult team in the Nemzeti Bajnokság I/B. At the end of the year, they won a bronze medal, and a year later they became silver medalists and were promoted to the Nemzeti Bajnokság I. In 2022/23, her first top-flight season, she scored 96 goals in 22 games. In the summer of 2023, she transferred to the Váci NKSE team, ranked sixth in the league and starting in the EHF European League. In her first season in Váci NKSE, she scored 106 goals in the Nemzeti Bajnokság I, and also scored 37 goals in the EHF European League. In the 2024/25 season, she scored 25 goals in 4 matches in the EHF European League.

=== National team ===
In August 2021, Luca scored 2 goals in the 25–19 final win over Germany at the Youth European Championship. In August 2022, she won a bronze medal at the Youth World Championships. In July 2023, at the Junior European Championship held in Romania, she scored 8 goals in the final against the Danish national team, helping the national team to its third consecutive Junior European Championship title. In June 2024, she won a silver medal with the national team at the Junior World Championship held in North Macedonia, after the Hungary women's national junior handball team lost to the France women's national junior handball team 29–26 in the final. She made her debut for the Hungarian women's adult national team in Tatabánya in November 2024 in a warm-up match against the Ukrainian national team, in which she scored five goals. She also participated in the 2024 European Women's Handball Championship, where the Hungarian team finished 3rd (4 matches / 5 goals). This was the first Hungarian medals since 2012.

== Honours ==
=== National team ===
- European Women's Handball Championship:
  - Bronze: 2024
- Junior European Championship:
  - Gold: 2023
- Youth European Championship:
  - Gold: 2021
- Junior World Championship:
  - Silver: 2024
- Youth World Championships:
  - Bronze: 2022

=== Club ===
NEKA

- Nemzeti Bajnokság I/B
  - Silver: 2022
  - Bronze: 2021
