= NHV Eredivisie Dames =

Handball league in the Netherlands

Nederlandse Handbal Eredivisie Dames
- Current season, competition or edition: 2026-27
- Sport: Handball
- Founded: 1954
- No. of teams: 12
- Country: Netherlands
- Confederation: EHF
- Most recent champion: VOC Amsterdam (2025-26)
- Most titles: HV Swift Roermond (19 titles)
- Relegation to: Eerste divisie
- Website: https://handbal.nl/

The Nederlandse Handbal Eredivisie Dames is the highest category in the national league system for women's handball clubs in the Netherlands. Swift Roermond is the competition's most successful team with nineteen titles, while VOC Amsterdam is the defending champion.

== Format ==
Each season 10 teams compete in a double round robin with 18 matches.

The teams placed 6th through 1st meet in a play-off for the title. The final is played as a best of three.

The 7th through 10th meet in a relegation group with 6 rounds (two against each team). The team that finished 7th in the regular season begins the play-offs with 4 points, decreasing to 1 point for the team that finished 10th. The team that finishes last in the play-offs is relegated to the Eerste Divisie.

== History ==
The tournament was established in 1954 under the name Hoofdklasse.

=== Naming history ===
- 1954 - 1977; Hoofdklasse
- 1977 - 2001; Eredivisie
- 2001 - 2005; Lucardi Eredivisie
- 2005 - 2013; AfAB Eredivisie
- 2014 - 2017; Lotto Eredivisie
- 2017 - 2024; Eredivisie
- 2024 - today; Super Handball League Women

== List of champions ==
- 1954 UDI 1896 Arnhem
- 1955 Hellas Den Haag
- 1956 NILOC Amsterdam
- 1957 Hellas Den Haag
- 1958 NILOC Amsterdam
- 1959 Zeeburg
- 1960 Zeeburg
- 1961 WLC Eindhoven
- 1962 NILOC Amsterdam
- 1963 Swift Roermond
- 1964 Swift Roermond
- 1965 Swift Roermond
- 1966 Swift Roermond
- 1967 Swift Roermond
- 1968 NILOC Amsterdam
- 1969 Swift Roermond
- 1970 Swift Roermond
- 1971 NILOC Amsterdam
- 1972 NILOC Amsterdam
- 1973 Swift Roermond
- 1974 Swift Roermond
- 1975 Swift Roermond
- 1976 Hellas Den Haag
- 1977 Hellas Den Haag
- 1978 Hellas Den Haag
- 1979 Swift Roermond
- 1980 Hellas Den Haag
- 1981 Hellas Den Haag
- 1982 Swift Roermond
- 1983 NILOC Amsterdam
- 1984 NILOC Amsterdam
- 1985 Ookmeer Amsterdam
- 1986 Ookmeer Amsterdam
- 1987 V&L Geleen
- 1988 Westfriesland SEW
- 1989 Westfriesland SEW
- 1990 V&L Geleen
- 1991 HV Aalsmeer
- 1992 Swift Roermond
- 1993 Swift Roermond
- 1994 Swift Roermond
- 1995 Swift Roermond
- 1996 Swift Roermond
- 1997 Swift Roermond
- 1998 Swift Roermond
- 1999 Westfriesland SEW
- 2000 VOC Amsterdam
- 2001 Westfriesland SEW
- 2002 Hellas Den Haag
- 2003 Westfriesland SEW
- 2004 Westfriesland SEW
- 2005 Hellas Den Haag
- 2006 Van der Voort/Quintus
- 2007 Van der Voort/Quintus
- 2008 VOC Amsterdam
- 2009 VOC Amsterdam
- 2010 VOC Amsterdam
- 2011 SV Dalfsen
- 2012 SV Dalfsen
- 2013 SV Dalfsen
- 2014 SV Dalfsen
- 2015 SV Dalfsen
- 2016 SV Dalfsen
- 2017 VOC Amsterdam
- 2018 VOC Amsterdam
- 2019 VOC Amsterdam
- 2020 No champions
- 2021 No champions
- 2022 HandbaL Venlo
- 2023 VOC Amsterdam
- 2024 HC Groot Venlo
- 2025 HV VZV
- 2026 VOC Amsterdam
