= Mihaela Mihai =

Romanian handball player (born 2004)

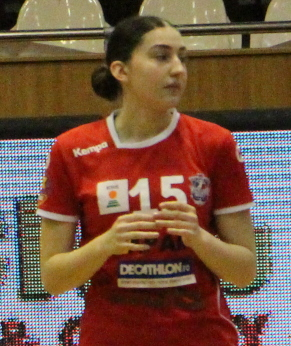

Personal information
- Born: 15 December 2004 (age 21) Bucharest, Romania
- Height: 1.78 m (5 ft 10 in)

Sport
- Sport: Handball
- Position: Right wing
- Current club: HC Dunărea Brăila
- Number: 2

Youth career
- Years: Team
- –: CSM București

Senior clubs
- Years: Team
- 2022–2026: CSM București
- 2022: → Dunărea Brăila (loan)
- 2026-: → Dunărea Brăila
National team
Years	Team	Apps	(Gls)
2022–	Romania	6	(4)
- Updated on 7 November 2025

Mihaela Andreea Mihai (born 15 December 2004) is a Romanian handball player who plays as a right wing for HC Dunărea Brăila and the Romania national team.
