= Nora Fajfrić =

Serbian handball player (born 2004)

Personal information
- Full name: Nora Rakic Fajfrić
- Nationality: Serbian-Norwegian
- Born: 18 March 2004 (age 22) Oslo, Norway
- Height: 1.76 m (5 ft 9 in)

Sport
- Sport: Handball
- Position: Centre back
- Current club: ŽRK Naisa
- Number: 14

Youth career
- Years: Team
- –: Ellingsrud IL
- –: Rælingen HK

Senior clubs
- Years: Team
- 2023–2025: ŽORK Jagodina
- 2025–2026: HC DAC Dunajská Streda
- 2026–: ŽRK Naisa
National team
Years	Team	Apps	(Gls)
2025–	Serbia	4	(2)

Nora Rakic Fajfrić (born 18 March 2004) is a Serbian-Norwegian handball player for ŽRK Naisa and the Serbian national team.

On 11 November 2026, Fajfrić was selected to represent Serbia at the 2026 European Women's Handball Championship.

== Club career ==
Fajfrić played for Ellingsrud IL as a youth and Rælingen HK at Norwegian 2. division (level 3), before joining Serbian side ŽORK Jagodina in 2023.

== Personal life ==
Fajfrić was born and raised in Oslo, Norway, where she attended Bjerke Upper Secondary School.

Her grandfather was Serbian handball player and coach Petar Fajfrić and the national team coach Sandra Kolaković is her aunt.
