= Romée Maarschalkerweerd =

Dutch handball player (born 2004)

Personal information
- Nationality: Dutch
- Born: 24 September 2004 (age 22) Naaldwijk, Netherlands
- Height: 1.80 m (5 ft 11 in)

Sport
- Sport: Handball
- Position: Pivot
- Current club: Odense Håndbold
- Number: 24

Senior clubs
- Years: Team
- –: WPK/Westlandia
- –: RKHV Quintus
- –2024: VOC Amsterdam
- 2024–2026: HH Elite
- 2026–: Odense Håndbold
National team
Years	Team	Apps	(Gls)
2024–	Netherlands	35	(71)
- Updated on 14 December 2025

Romée Maarschalkerweerd (born 24 September 2004) is a Dutch Handball player for Odense Håndbold and the Netherlands national team.

== Career ==
In the Netherlands Maarschalkerweerd played for WPK/Westlandia and RKHV Quintus before jonng VOC Amsterdam. Here she won the 2023 Dutch Championship.

For the 2024–25 season she joined Danish club HH Elite. For the 2026–27 season, she joined Odense Håndbold.

Her first major international tournament was the 2024 European Championship, where Netherlands placed 6th.

She also represented Netherlands at the 2025 World Women's Handball Championship at home.

== Private ==
Her grandmother was also a handball player. Her sister Britt Maarschalkerweerd is also a handball player and they were teammates at VOC Amsterdam.
