= Diana Lixăndroiu =

Romanian handball player (born 2005)

Personal information
- Born: 14 August 2005 (age 21) Slatina, Romania
- Height: 1.84 m (6 ft 0 in)

Sport
- Sport: Handball
- Position: Left back
- Current club: HC Dunărea Brăila
- Number: 2

Senior clubs
- Years: Team
- 2022–2024: CSM Slatina
- 2024–: HC Dunărea Brăila
National team
Years	Team	Apps	(Gls)
2022–	Romania	11	(9)
- Updated on 27 October 2025

Diana Maria Lixăndroiu (born 14 August 2005) is a Romanian handball player who plays for HC Dunărea Brăila and the Romania national team.

She represented Romania at the 2022 European Championship.
