= Luciana Rebelo =

Portuguese handball player (born 2005)

Personal information
- Full name: Luciana Resende Rebelo
- Nationality: Portuguese
- Born: 25 July 2005 (age 21) Santa Maria da Feira, Portugal
- Height: 1.87 m (6 ft 2 in)

Sport
- Sport: Handball
- Position: Right back
- Current club: AC Alavarium
- Number: 7

Senior clubs
- Years: Team
- 2021-2022: Maiastars
- 2022–2023: S.L. Benfica
- 2023: Madeira Andebol SAD
- 2023–12/2024: Team Esbjerg
National team
Years	Team	Apps	(Gls)
2023–	Portugal	16	(26)

Luciana Resende Rebelo (born 25 July 2005) is a Portuguese handball player for AC Alavarium and the Portuguese national team. Between September 2023 and December 2024, she played for the Danish top tier Team Esbjerg.

She represented Portugal at the 2024 European Women's Handball Championship.
