= 2012 Women's Junior World Handball Championship =

Tournament details
- Host country: Czech Republic
- Venues: 4 (in 2 host cities)
- Dates: 1 – 14 July 2012
- Teams: 24 (from 4 confederations)

Final positions
- Champions: Sweden (1st title)
- Runners-up: France
- Third place: Hungary
- Fourth place: Serbia

Tournament statistics
- Matches played: 100
- Goals scored: 5,523 (55.23 per match)
- Top scorers: (Hungary) Kinga Klivinyi (67 goals)

Awards
- Best player: (South Korea) Lee Hyo-Jin

The 2012 Women's Junior World Handball Championship was the 18th edition of the tournament and took place in the Czech Republic from 1 to 14 July.

Sweden won the title for the first time after defeating France 29–22 in the final.

== Seeding ==
The pots were announced on April 11, 2012.

Pot 1	Pot 2	Pot 3	Pot 4	Pot 5	Pot 6
Denmark; Netherlands; Austria; South Korea	Serbia; Sweden; Russia; Romania	Croatia; Hungary; Czech Republic; France	Poland; China; Brazil; Congo	Norway; Kazakhstan; Uruguay; Angola	Spain; Japan; Argentina; Tunisia

== Preliminary round ==
The draw was held on April 18, 2012 in Ostrava, Czech Republic.

All times are local (UTC+2).

=== Group A ===
Team	Pld	W	D	L	GF	GA	GD	Pts
Serbia	5	4	1	0	139	112	+27	9
Hungary	5	3	1	1	135	104	+31	7
Spain	5	3	0	2	140	116	+24	6
Denmark	5	3	0	2	119	100	+19	6
Uruguay	5	1	0	4	107	147	−40	2
China	5	0	0	5	105	166	−61	0

1 July 2012; 15:00	Denmark	29 – 19	China	Sports hall Ostrava Dubina, Ostrava; Referees: El-Maomly, El Sayed (EGY)
1 July 2012; 15:00	Kristensen, Johansen 6	(18–7)	Li Xiaoqing, Zhou Qi 3	Sports hall Ostrava Dubina, Ostrava; Referees: El-Maomly, El Sayed (EGY)
1 July 2012; 15:00	2× (yellow card) 1× (suspension)	Report	3× (yellow card) 3× (suspension)	Sports hall Ostrava Dubina, Ostrava; Referees: El-Maomly, El Sayed (EGY)

1 July 2012; 17:15	Serbia	25 – 22	Spain	Sports hall Ostrava Dubina, Ostrava; Referees: Eliasson, Gudjonsson (ISL)
1 July 2012; 17:15	Obradović 9	(11–11)	Gonzalez Ortega 8	Sports hall Ostrava Dubina, Ostrava; Referees: Eliasson, Gudjonsson (ISL)
1 July 2012; 17:15	3× (yellow card) 8× (suspension)	Report	3× (yellow card) 2× (suspension)	Sports hall Ostrava Dubina, Ostrava; Referees: Eliasson, Gudjonsson (ISL)

1 July 2012; 19:30	Hungary	37 – 22	Uruguay	Sports hall Ostrava Dubina, Ostrava; Referees: Cacador, Nicolau (POR)
1 July 2012; 19:30	Klivinyi 8	(18–10)	Scarrone 5	Sports hall Ostrava Dubina, Ostrava; Referees: Cacador, Nicolau (POR)
1 July 2012; 19:30	3× (yellow card) 7× (suspension)	Report	3× (yellow card) 6× (suspension)	Sports hall Ostrava Dubina, Ostrava; Referees: Cacador, Nicolau (POR)

2 July 2012; 15:00	China	22 – 37	Serbia	Sports hall Ostrava Dubina, Ostrava; Referees: Cacador, Nicolau (POR)
2 July 2012; 15:00	Jin Mengqing 5	(13–20)	Georgijev 9	Sports hall Ostrava Dubina, Ostrava; Referees: Cacador, Nicolau (POR)
2 July 2012; 15:00	4× (yellow card) 11× (suspension)	Report	3× (yellow card) 3× (suspension)	Sports hall Ostrava Dubina, Ostrava; Referees: Cacador, Nicolau (POR)

2 July 2012; 17:15	Uruguay	12 – 24	Denmark	Sports hall Ostrava Dubina, Ostrava; Referees: Al Mutaw'a, Al Suwailem (KUW)
2 July 2012; 17:15	three players 2	(8–10)	Poulsen 7	Sports hall Ostrava Dubina, Ostrava; Referees: Al Mutaw'a, Al Suwailem (KUW)
2 July 2012; 17:15	3× (yellow card) 2× (suspension)	Report	2× (yellow card) 4× (suspension)	Sports hall Ostrava Dubina, Ostrava; Referees: Al Mutaw'a, Al Suwailem (KUW)

2 July 2012; 19:30	Spain	25 – 26	Hungary	Sports hall Ostrava Dubina, Ostrava; Referees: Leszczynski, Piechota (POL)
2 July 2012; 19:30	Segura Grau, Gonzalez Ortega 8	(12–12)	Klivinyi 9	Sports hall Ostrava Dubina, Ostrava; Referees: Leszczynski, Piechota (POL)
2 July 2012; 19:30	3× (yellow card) 3× (suspension)	Report	3× (yellow card) 8× (suspension)	Sports hall Ostrava Dubina, Ostrava; Referees: Leszczynski, Piechota (POL)

3 July 2012; 15:00	Denmark	24 – 25	Spain	Sports hall Ostrava Dubina, Ostrava; Referees: Lah, Sok (SLO)
3 July 2012; 15:00	Poulsen 6	(12–12)	Gonzalez Ortega 9	Sports hall Ostrava Dubina, Ostrava; Referees: Lah, Sok (SLO)
3 July 2012; 15:00	3× (yellow card) 1× (suspension)	Report	3× (yellow card) 1× (suspension)	Sports hall Ostrava Dubina, Ostrava; Referees: Lah, Sok (SLO)

3 July 2012; 17:15	Serbia	18 – 18	Hungary	Sports hall Ostrava Dubina, Ostrava; Referees: Stefan, Stark (ROU)
3 July 2012; 17:15	Filipović 5	(8–12)	Planeta, Klivinyi 5	Sports hall Ostrava Dubina, Ostrava; Referees: Stefan, Stark (ROU)
3 July 2012; 17:15	3× (yellow card) 3× (suspension)	Report	4× (yellow card) 6× (suspension) 1× (red card)	Sports hall Ostrava Dubina, Ostrava; Referees: Stefan, Stark (ROU)

3 July 2012; 19:30	China	24 – 25	Uruguay	Sports hall Ostrava Dubina, Ostrava; Referees: Eliasson, Gudjonsson (ISL)
3 July 2012; 19:30	Qiao Ru 7	(12–10)	Scarrone 7	Sports hall Ostrava Dubina, Ostrava; Referees: Eliasson, Gudjonsson (ISL)
3 July 2012; 19:30	3× (yellow card) 8× (suspension)	Report	4× (yellow card) 4× (suspension)	Sports hall Ostrava Dubina, Ostrava; Referees: Eliasson, Gudjonsson (ISL)

5 July 2012; 15:00	Serbia	33 – 29	Uruguay	Sports hall Ostrava Dubina, Ostrava; Referees: Leszczynski, Piechota (POL)
5 July 2012; 15:00	Ribicic, Georijev 6	(18–11)	Scarrone 7	Sports hall Ostrava Dubina, Ostrava; Referees: Leszczynski, Piechota (POL)
5 July 2012; 15:00	3× (yellow card) 5× (suspension)	Report	3× (yellow card) 4× (suspension)	Sports hall Ostrava Dubina, Ostrava; Referees: Leszczynski, Piechota (POL)

5 July 2012; 17:15	Hungary	18 – 21	Denmark	Sports hall Ostrava Dubina, Ostrava; Referees: Cacador, Nicolau (POR)
5 July 2012; 17:15	Klivinyi 6	(10–11)	Kristensen 5	Sports hall Ostrava Dubina, Ostrava; Referees: Cacador, Nicolau (POR)
5 July 2012; 17:15	4× (yellow card) 1× (red card)	Report	3× (yellow card) 1× (suspension)	Sports hall Ostrava Dubina, Ostrava; Referees: Cacador, Nicolau (POR)

5 July 2012; 19:30	Spain	39 – 22	China	Sports hall Ostrava Dubina, Ostrava; Referees: Stefan, Stark (ROU)
5 July 2012; 19:30	Ausas Buequets, Frances Aguado 7	(17–9)	Jin Mengqinq 7	Sports hall Ostrava Dubina, Ostrava; Referees: Stefan, Stark (ROU)
5 July 2012; 19:30	2× (yellow card) 3× (suspension)	Report	3× (yellow card) 3× (suspension)	Sports hall Ostrava Dubina, Ostrava; Referees: Stefan, Stark (ROU)

6 July 2012; 15:00	Uruguay	19 – 29	Spain	Sports hall Ostrava Dubina, Ostrava; Referees: El Moamly, El Sayed (EGY)
6 July 2012; 15:00	Scarrone 7	(7–13)	Sempere Herrera, Gonzalez Ortega 5	Sports hall Ostrava Dubina, Ostrava; Referees: El Moamly, El Sayed (EGY)
6 July 2012; 15:00	3× (yellow card) 5× (suspension)	Report	3× (yellow card) 5× (suspension)	Sports hall Ostrava Dubina, Ostrava; Referees: El Moamly, El Sayed (EGY)

6 July 2012; 17:15	Hungary	36 – 18	China	Sports hall Ostrava Dubina, Ostrava; Referees: Al Mutaw'a, Al Swuwailem (KUW)
6 July 2012; 17:15	Klivinyi 12	(18–7)	Jin Mengqing, Qiao Ru 4	Sports hall Ostrava Dubina, Ostrava; Referees: Al Mutaw'a, Al Swuwailem (KUW)
6 July 2012; 17:15	2× (yellow card) 5× (suspension)	Report	3× (yellow card) 2× (suspension)	Sports hall Ostrava Dubina, Ostrava; Referees: Al Mutaw'a, Al Swuwailem (KUW)

6 July 2012; 19:30	Denmark	21 – 26	Serbia	Sports hall Ostrava Dubina, Ostrava; Referees: Stefan, Stark (ROU)
6 July 2012; 19:30	Poulsen, Woller 3	(11–16)	Obradović 8	Sports hall Ostrava Dubina, Ostrava; Referees: Stefan, Stark (ROU)
6 July 2012; 19:30	2× (yellow card) 3× (suspension)	Report	2× (yellow card) 4× (suspension)	Sports hall Ostrava Dubina, Ostrava; Referees: Stefan, Stark (ROU)

=== Group B ===
Team	Pld	W	D	L	GF	GA	GD	Pts
South Korea	5	4	1	0	174	113	+61	9
Sweden	5	4	1	0	142	107	+35	9
Czech Republic	5	3	0	2	119	108	+11	6
Congo	5	2	0	3	123	161	−38	4
Argentina	5	1	0	4	125	135	−10	2
Kazakhstan	5	0	0	5	130	189	−59	0

1 July 2012; 15:00	South Korea	42 – 13	Congo	ZS Sareza Ostrava, Ostrava; Referees: Leszczynski, Piechota (POL)
1 July 2012; 15:00	Lee Hyo-Jin, Kim Soo-Jung 6	(18–7)	Nkouka 7	ZS Sareza Ostrava, Ostrava; Referees: Leszczynski, Piechota (POL)
1 July 2012; 15:00	3× (yellow card) 3× (suspension)	Report	3× (yellow card) 2× (suspension)	ZS Sareza Ostrava, Ostrava; Referees: Leszczynski, Piechota (POL)

1 July 2012; 17:15	Czech Republic	32 – 22	Kazakhstan	ZS Sareza Ostrava, Ostrava; Referees: Stefan, Stark (ROU)
1 July 2012; 17:15	Marcikova 6	(18–11)	Aleksandrova 9	ZS Sareza Ostrava, Ostrava; Referees: Stefan, Stark (ROU)
1 July 2012; 17:15	3× (yellow card) 4× (suspension)	Report	3× (yellow card) 4× (suspension)	ZS Sareza Ostrava, Ostrava; Referees: Stefan, Stark (ROU)

1 July 2012; 19:30	Sweden	19 – 18	Argentina	ZS Sareza Ostrava, Ostrava; Referees: Al Mutaw'a, Al Suwailem (KUW)
1 July 2012; 19:30	Lindh 4	(10–7)	Vico 7	ZS Sareza Ostrava, Ostrava; Referees: Al Mutaw'a, Al Suwailem (KUW)
1 July 2012; 19:30	2× (yellow card) 3× (suspension) 1× (red card)	Report	2× (yellow card) 5× (suspension)	ZS Sareza Ostrava, Ostrava; Referees: Al Mutaw'a, Al Suwailem (KUW)

2 July 2012; 15:00	Congo	21 – 29	Sweden	ZS Sareza Ostrava, Ostrava; Referees: Stefan, Stark (ROU)
2 July 2012; 15:00	Nkouka 8	(12–15)	Larsson 5	ZS Sareza Ostrava, Ostrava; Referees: Stefan, Stark (ROU)
2 July 2012; 15:00	3× (yellow card) 5× (suspension)	Report	3× (yellow card) 2× (suspension)	ZS Sareza Ostrava, Ostrava; Referees: Stefan, Stark (ROU)

2 July 2012; 17:15	Kazakhstan	25 – 48	South Korea	ZS Sareza Ostrava, Ostrava; Referees: El Moamly, El Sayed (EGY)
2 July 2012; 17:15	Toktarova 10	(13–23)	Lee Hyo-Jin 7	ZS Sareza Ostrava, Ostrava; Referees: El Moamly, El Sayed (EGY)
2 July 2012; 17:15	2× (yellow card) 3× (suspension)	Report	4× (yellow card) 4× (suspension)	ZS Sareza Ostrava, Ostrava; Referees: El Moamly, El Sayed (EGY)

2 July 2012; 19:30	Argentina	15 – 22	Czech Republic	ZS Sareza Ostrava, Ostrava; Referees: Lah, Sok (SLO)
2 July 2012; 19:30	Mosciaro 4	(9–8)	Kubackova 5	ZS Sareza Ostrava, Ostrava; Referees: Lah, Sok (SLO)
2 July 2012; 19:30	3× (yellow card) 4× (suspension)	Report	3× (yellow card) 4× (suspension)	ZS Sareza Ostrava, Ostrava; Referees: Lah, Sok (SLO)

3 July 2012; 15:15	South Korea	34 – 29	Argentina	ZS Sareza Ostrava, Ostrava; Referees: Cacador, Nicolau (POR)
3 July 2012; 15:15	Kim Jin-Yi 11	(15–16)	Vico 10	ZS Sareza Ostrava, Ostrava; Referees: Cacador, Nicolau (POR)
3 July 2012; 15:15	3× (yellow card) 2× (suspension)	Report	3× (yellow card) 5× (suspension)	ZS Sareza Ostrava, Ostrava; Referees: Cacador, Nicolau (POR)

3 July 2012; 17:30	Sweden	28 – 17	Czech Republic	ZS Sareza Ostrava, Ostrava; Referees: Leszczynski, Piechota (POL)
3 July 2012; 17:30	Adler 7	(14–9)	Janouskova 5	ZS Sareza Ostrava, Ostrava; Referees: Leszczynski, Piechota (POL)
3 July 2012; 17:30	3× (yellow card) 4× (suspension)	Report	3× (yellow card) 5× (suspension)	ZS Sareza Ostrava, Ostrava; Referees: Leszczynski, Piechota (POL)

3 July 2012; 19:45	Congo	37 – 31	Kazakhstan	ZS Sareza Ostrava, Ostrava; Referees: Al Mutaw'a, Al Suwailem (KUW)
3 July 2012; 19:45	Tchikaya 10	(20–16)	Aleksandrova 10	ZS Sareza Ostrava, Ostrava; Referees: Al Mutaw'a, Al Suwailem (KUW)
3 July 2012; 19:45	3× (yellow card) 2× (suspension)	Report	2× (yellow card) 1× (suspension)	ZS Sareza Ostrava, Ostrava; Referees: Al Mutaw'a, Al Suwailem (KUW)

5 July 2012; 15:15	Sweden	41 – 26	Kazakhstan	ZS Sareza Ostrava, Ostrava; Referees: Lah, Sok (SLO)
5 July 2012; 15:15	Stromberg 7	(21–14)	Toktarova, Aleksandrova 7	ZS Sareza Ostrava, Ostrava; Referees: Lah, Sok (SLO)
5 July 2012; 15:15	3× (yellow card) 2× (suspension)	Report	3× (yellow card) 4× (suspension)	ZS Sareza Ostrava, Ostrava; Referees: Lah, Sok (SLO)

5 July 2012; 17:30	Czech Republic	21 – 25	South Korea	ZS Sareza Ostrava, Ostrava; Referees: Eliasson, Gudjonsson (ISL)
5 July 2012; 17:30	Marcikova 6	(11–16)	Park Joo-Eun, Kim Jin-Yi 6	ZS Sareza Ostrava, Ostrava; Referees: Eliasson, Gudjonsson (ISL)
5 July 2012; 17:30	3× (yellow card) 2× (suspension)	Report	3× (yellow card) 4× (suspension)	ZS Sareza Ostrava, Ostrava; Referees: Eliasson, Gudjonsson (ISL)

5 July 2012; 19:45	Argentina	32 – 34	Congo	ZS Sareza Ostrava, Ostrava; Referees: El Moamly, El Sayed (EGY)
5 July 2012; 19:45	Vico 9	(16–18)	Mambou 6	ZS Sareza Ostrava, Ostrava; Referees: El Moamly, El Sayed (EGY)
5 July 2012; 19:45	2× (yellow card) 2× (suspension)	Report	3× (yellow card) 4× (suspension) 1× (red card)	ZS Sareza Ostrava, Ostrava; Referees: El Moamly, El Sayed (EGY)

6 July 2012; 15:15	Kazakhstan	26 – 31	Argentina	ZS Sareza Ostrava, Ostrava; Referees: Eliasson, Gudjonsson (ISL)
6 July 2012; 15:15	Tolstikhina 7	(10–16)	Alonso 7	ZS Sareza Ostrava, Ostrava; Referees: Eliasson, Gudjonsson (ISL)
6 July 2012; 15:15	3× (yellow card) 2× (suspension)	Report	4× (yellow card) 4× (suspension)	ZS Sareza Ostrava, Ostrava; Referees: Eliasson, Gudjonsson (ISL)

6 July 2012; 17:30	Czech Republic	27 – 18	Congo	ZS Sareza Ostrava, Ostrava; Referees: Leszczynski, Piechota (POL)
6 July 2012; 17:30	Janouskova 8	(17–7)	three players 4	ZS Sareza Ostrava, Ostrava; Referees: Leszczynski, Piechota (POL)
6 July 2012; 17:30	3× (yellow card) 4× (suspension)	Report	4× (yellow card) 5× (suspension)	ZS Sareza Ostrava, Ostrava; Referees: Leszczynski, Piechota (POL)

6 July 2012; 19:45	South Korea	25 – 25	Sweden	ZS Sareza Ostrava, Ostrava; Referees: Lah, Sok (SLO)
6 July 2012; 19:45	Kim Jin-Yi 9	(13–12)	Adler 6	ZS Sareza Ostrava, Ostrava; Referees: Lah, Sok (SLO)
6 July 2012; 19:45	3× (yellow card) 4× (suspension)	Report	3× (yellow card) 2× (suspension)	ZS Sareza Ostrava, Ostrava; Referees: Lah, Sok (SLO)

=== Group C ===
Team	Pld	W	D	L	GF	GA	GD	Pts
Russia	5	5	0	0	154	120	+34	10
France	5	3	1	1	135	104	+31	7
Austria	5	3	1	1	148	127	+21	7
Poland	5	2	0	3	141	137	+4	4
Angola	5	1	0	4	113	154	−41	2
Japan	5	0	0	5	116	165	−49	0

1 July 2012; 15:00	Austria	37 – 29	Poland	Sportovní hala Vodova, Brno; Attendance: 100; Referees: Mousavian, Kolahdouzan (IRN)
1 July 2012; 15:00	Frey 10	(20–12)	Zych 7	Sportovní hala Vodova, Brno; Attendance: 100; Referees: Mousavian, Kolahdouzan (IRN)
1 July 2012; 15:00	3× (yellow card) 3× (suspension)	Report	2× (yellow card) 4× (suspension)	Sportovní hala Vodova, Brno; Attendance: 100; Referees: Mousavian, Kolahdouzan (IRN)

1 July 2012; 17:15	Russia	28 – 16	Japan	Sportovní hala Vodova, Brno; Attendance: 100; Referees: Lythje, Christiansen (DEN)
1 July 2012; 17:15	Danshina, Garanina 5	(14–6)	Takeshita 4	Sportovní hala Vodova, Brno; Attendance: 100; Referees: Lythje, Christiansen (DEN)
1 July 2012; 17:15	3× (yellow card)	Report	3× (yellow card) 3× (suspension)	Sportovní hala Vodova, Brno; Attendance: 100; Referees: Lythje, Christiansen (DEN)

1 July 2012; 19:30	France	33 – 15	Angola	Sportovní hala Vodova, Brno; Attendance: 100; Referees: Grillo, Lenci (ARG)
1 July 2012; 19:30	Benouamer 5	(16–6)	Albertina 3	Sportovní hala Vodova, Brno; Attendance: 100; Referees: Grillo, Lenci (ARG)
1 July 2012; 19:30	3× (yellow card) 2× (suspension)	Report	2× (yellow card) 7× (suspension)	Sportovní hala Vodova, Brno; Attendance: 100; Referees: Grillo, Lenci (ARG)

2 July 2012; 15:00	Poland	27 – 34	Russia	Sportovní hala Vodova, Brno; Attendance: 50; Referees: Lythje, Christiansen (DEN)
2 July 2012; 15:00	Galinska 5	(10–17)	four players 4	Sportovní hala Vodova, Brno; Attendance: 50; Referees: Lythje, Christiansen (DEN)
2 July 2012; 15:00	3× (yellow card) 7× (suspension)	Report	3× (yellow card) 2× (suspension)	Sportovní hala Vodova, Brno; Attendance: 50; Referees: Lythje, Christiansen (DEN)

2 July 2012; 17:15	Angola	20 – 30	Austria	Sportovní hala Vodova, Brno; Attendance: 50; Referees: Opava, Valek (CZE)
2 July 2012; 17:15	Jocelina 8	(9–16)	Ivancok, Logvin 6	Sportovní hala Vodova, Brno; Attendance: 50; Referees: Opava, Valek (CZE)
2 July 2012; 17:15	2× (yellow card) 5× (suspension) 1× (red card)	Report	3× (yellow card) 5× (suspension)	Sportovní hala Vodova, Brno; Attendance: 50; Referees: Opava, Valek (CZE)

2 July 2012; 19:30	Japan	25 – 38	France	Sportovní hala Vodova, Brno; Attendance: 50; Referees: Gonzalez, Orieto (URU)
2 July 2012; 19:30	Watanabe 6	(7–22)	Rassinoux 6	Sportovní hala Vodova, Brno; Attendance: 50; Referees: Gonzalez, Orieto (URU)
2 July 2012; 19:30	2× (yellow card) 2× (suspension)	Report	2× (yellow card) 2× (suspension)	Sportovní hala Vodova, Brno; Attendance: 50; Referees: Gonzalez, Orieto (URU)

3 July 2012; 15:00	Austria	35 – 27	Japan	Sportovní hala Vodova, Brno; Attendance: 50; Referees: Grillo, Lenci (ARG)
3 July 2012; 15:00	Ivancok 15	(15–10)	Takeshita 9	Sportovní hala Vodova, Brno; Attendance: 50; Referees: Grillo, Lenci (ARG)
3 July 2012; 15:00	2× (yellow card) 1× (suspension)	Report	3× (yellow card) 1× (suspension)	Sportovní hala Vodova, Brno; Attendance: 50; Referees: Grillo, Lenci (ARG)

3 July 2012; 17:15	Russia	22 – 21	France	Sportovní hala Vodova, Brno; Attendance: 50; Referees: Opava, Valek (CZE)
3 July 2012; 17:15	Dmitrieva, Vyakhireva 4	(14–13)	Lassource 4	Sportovní hala Vodova, Brno; Attendance: 50; Referees: Opava, Valek (CZE)
3 July 2012; 17:15	3× (yellow card) 3× (suspension)	Report	2× (yellow card) 5× (suspension) 1× (red card)	Sportovní hala Vodova, Brno; Attendance: 50; Referees: Opava, Valek (CZE)

3 July 2012; 19:30	Poland	27 – 20	Angola	Sportovní hala Vodova, Brno; Referees: Li, Wang (CHN)
3 July 2012; 19:30	Galinska 8	(12–13)	Jocelina 6	Sportovní hala Vodova, Brno; Referees: Li, Wang (CHN)
3 July 2012; 19:30	4× (yellow card) 3× (suspension)	Report	3× (yellow card) 4× (suspension)	Sportovní hala Vodova, Brno; Referees: Li, Wang (CHN)

5 July 2012; 15:00	Russia	37 – 28	Angola	Sportovní hala Vodova, Brno; Attendance: 50; Referees: Grillo, Lenci (ARG)
5 July 2012; 15:00	Pankovichenko 8	(17–9)	three players 6	Sportovní hala Vodova, Brno; Attendance: 50; Referees: Grillo, Lenci (ARG)
5 July 2012; 15:00	3× (yellow card) 3× (suspension)	Report	3× (yellow card) 2× (suspension)	Sportovní hala Vodova, Brno; Attendance: 50; Referees: Grillo, Lenci (ARG)

5 July 2012; 17:15	France	18 – 18	Austria	Sportovní hala Vodova, Brno; Attendance: 100; Referees: Lythje, Christiansen (DEN)
5 July 2012; 17:15	Houette 4	(11–8)	Logvin 5	Sportovní hala Vodova, Brno; Attendance: 100; Referees: Lythje, Christiansen (DEN)
5 July 2012; 17:15	3× (yellow card) 4× (suspension)	Report	3× (yellow card) 2× (suspension)	Sportovní hala Vodova, Brno; Attendance: 100; Referees: Lythje, Christiansen (DEN)

5 July 2012; 19:30	Japan	21 – 34	Poland	Sportovní hala Vodova, Brno; Attendance: 50; Referees: Mousavian, Kolahdouzan (IRN)
5 July 2012; 19:30	Watanabe, Kodate 5	(13–15)	Galinska 14	Sportovní hala Vodova, Brno; Attendance: 50; Referees: Mousavian, Kolahdouzan (IRN)
5 July 2012; 19:30	3× (yellow card) 3× (suspension)	Report	2× (yellow card) 4× (suspension)	Sportovní hala Vodova, Brno; Attendance: 50; Referees: Mousavian, Kolahdouzan (IRN)

6 July 2012; 15:00	Angola	30 – 27	Japan	Sportovní hala Vodova, Brno; Attendance: 50; Referees: Gonzalez, Prieto (URU)
6 July 2012; 15:00	Jocelina 11	(15–14)	Watanabe, Ikki 6	Sportovní hala Vodova, Brno; Attendance: 50; Referees: Gonzalez, Prieto (URU)
6 July 2012; 15:00	2× (yellow card)	Report	2× (yellow card) 1× (suspension)	Sportovní hala Vodova, Brno; Attendance: 50; Referees: Gonzalez, Prieto (URU)

6 July 2012; 17:15	France	25 – 24	Poland	Sportovní hala Vodova, Brno; Attendance: 50; Referees: Horvath, Marton (HUN)
6 July 2012; 17:15	Zaadi 6	(12–10)	Zych 6	Sportovní hala Vodova, Brno; Attendance: 50; Referees: Horvath, Marton (HUN)
6 July 2012; 17:15	4× (yellow card) 5× (suspension)	Report	3× (yellow card) 1× (suspension)	Sportovní hala Vodova, Brno; Attendance: 50; Referees: Horvath, Marton (HUN)

6 July 2012; 19:30	Austria	28 – 33	Russia	Sportovní hala Vodova, Brno; Attendance: 50; Referees: Li, Wang (CHN)
6 July 2012; 19:30	Ivancok 9	(11–18)	Milova 9	Sportovní hala Vodova, Brno; Attendance: 50; Referees: Li, Wang (CHN)
6 July 2012; 19:30	4× (yellow card) 4× (suspension)	Report	3× (yellow card) 1× (suspension)	Sportovní hala Vodova, Brno; Attendance: 50; Referees: Li, Wang (CHN)

=== Group D ===
Team	Pld	W	D	L	GF	GA	GD	Pts
Brazil	5	4	0	1	133	127	+6	8
Norway	5	3	1	1	124	108	+16	7
Romania	5	3	0	2	127	115	+12	6
Croatia	5	2	1	2	134	115	+19	5
Netherlands	5	1	2	2	140	128	+12	4
Tunisia	5	0	0	5	113	177	−64	0

1 July 2012; 15:00	Netherlands	29 – 32	Brazil	Sportovní hala Vodova, Brno; Attendance: 50; Referees: Horváth, Marton (HUN)
1 July 2012; 15:00	Abbingh 8	(17–17)	Rocha 9	Sportovní hala Vodova, Brno; Attendance: 50; Referees: Horváth, Marton (HUN)
1 July 2012; 15:00	3× (yellow card) 7× (suspension)	Report	2× (yellow card) 5× (suspension)	Sportovní hala Vodova, Brno; Attendance: 50; Referees: Horváth, Marton (HUN)

1 July 2012; 17:15	Romania	37 – 28	Tunisia	Sportovní hala Vodova, Brno; Attendance: 50; Referees: Mosorinski, Pandzic (SRB)
1 July 2012; 17:15	Pricopi 6	(15–13)	Hamrouni, Dhaouadi 8	Sportovní hala Vodova, Brno; Attendance: 50; Referees: Mosorinski, Pandzic (SRB)
1 July 2012; 17:15	4× (yellow card) 5× (suspension)	Report	3× (yellow card) 2× (suspension)	Sportovní hala Vodova, Brno; Attendance: 50; Referees: Mosorinski, Pandzic (SRB)

1 July 2012; 19:30	Croatia	21 – 22	Norway	Sportovní hala Vodova, Brno; Attendance: 50; Referees: Opava, Valek (CZE)
1 July 2012; 19:30	Toto 5	(13–13)	Hansen 7	Sportovní hala Vodova, Brno; Attendance: 50; Referees: Opava, Valek (CZE)
1 July 2012; 19:30	3× (yellow card) 5× (suspension)	Report	3× (yellow card) 1× (suspension)	Sportovní hala Vodova, Brno; Attendance: 50; Referees: Opava, Valek (CZE)

2 July 2012; 15:00	Brazil	24 – 22	Romania	Sportovní hala Vodova, Brno; Attendance: 50; Referees: Mousavian, Kolahdouzan (IRN)
2 July 2012; 15:00	Malta Varela 7	(10–13)	Buceschi 12	Sportovní hala Vodova, Brno; Attendance: 50; Referees: Mousavian, Kolahdouzan (IRN)
2 July 2012; 15:00	4× (yellow card) 2× (suspension)	Report	2× (yellow card)	Sportovní hala Vodova, Brno; Attendance: 50; Referees: Mousavian, Kolahdouzan (IRN)

2 July 2012; 17:15	Norway	22 – 22	Netherlands	Sportovní hala Vodova, Brno; Attendance: 100; Referees: Mosorinski, Pandzic (SRB)
2 July 2012; 17:15	Breistøl 6	(10–10)	Abbingh 5	Sportovní hala Vodova, Brno; Attendance: 100; Referees: Mosorinski, Pandzic (SRB)
2 July 2012; 17:15	4× (yellow card) 1× (suspension)	Report	3× (yellow card) 1× (suspension)	Sportovní hala Vodova, Brno; Attendance: 100; Referees: Mosorinski, Pandzic (SRB)

2 July 2012; 19:30	Tunisia	20 – 33	Croatia	Sportovní hala Vodova, Brno; Attendance: 50; Referees: Li, Wang (CHN)
2 July 2012; 19:30	Chabchoub 8	(7–17)	Toto 8	Sportovní hala Vodova, Brno; Attendance: 50; Referees: Li, Wang (CHN)
2 July 2012; 19:30	1× (yellow card) 1× (suspension)	Report	2× (yellow card) 6× (suspension)	Sportovní hala Vodova, Brno; Attendance: 50; Referees: Li, Wang (CHN)

3 July 2012; 15:00	Netherlands	41 – 24	Tunisia	Sportovní hala Vodova, Brno; Attendance: 50; Referees: Gonzalez, Prieto (URU)
3 July 2012; 15:00	Hoekstra 7	(15–9)	Dhaouadi 8	Sportovní hala Vodova, Brno; Attendance: 50; Referees: Gonzalez, Prieto (URU)
3 July 2012; 15:00	3× (yellow card) 5× (suspension)	Report	3× (yellow card) 1× (suspension)	Sportovní hala Vodova, Brno; Attendance: 50; Referees: Gonzalez, Prieto (URU)

3 July 2012; 17:15	Romania	23 – 19	Croatia	Sportovní hala Vodova, Brno; Attendance: 50; Referees: Lythje, Christiansen (DEN)
3 July 2012; 17:15	Buceschi 8	(12–9)	Toto 8	Sportovní hala Vodova, Brno; Attendance: 50; Referees: Lythje, Christiansen (DEN)
3 July 2012; 17:15	4× (yellow card) 3× (suspension)	Report	4× (yellow card) 7× (suspension)	Sportovní hala Vodova, Brno; Attendance: 50; Referees: Lythje, Christiansen (DEN)

3 July 2012; 19:30	Brazil	23 – 21	Norway	Sportovní hala Vodova, Brno; Attendance: 50; Referees: Horvath, Marton (HUN)
3 July 2012; 19:30	Nunes 8	(11–13)	Breistøl 7	Sportovní hala Vodova, Brno; Attendance: 50; Referees: Horvath, Marton (HUN)
3 July 2012; 19:30	4× (yellow card) 4× (suspension)	Report	4× (yellow card)	Sportovní hala Vodova, Brno; Attendance: 50; Referees: Horvath, Marton (HUN)

5 July 2012; 15:00	Romania	23 – 24	Norway	Sportovní hala Vodova, Brno; Referees: Opava, Valek (CZE)
5 July 2012; 15:00	Buceschi 9	(12–11)	Heiberg 6	Sportovní hala Vodova, Brno; Referees: Opava, Valek (CZE)
5 July 2012; 15:00	4× (yellow card) 3× (suspension)	Report	3× (yellow card) 6× (suspension)	Sportovní hala Vodova, Brno; Referees: Opava, Valek (CZE)

5 July 2012; 17:15	Croatia	28 – 28	Netherlands	Sportovní hala Vodova, Brno; Referees: Horvath, Marton (HUN)
5 July 2012; 17:15	Toto 12	(16–13)	Malestein 9	Sportovní hala Vodova, Brno; Referees: Horvath, Marton (HUN)
5 July 2012; 17:15	3× (yellow card) 3× (suspension)	Report	3× (yellow card) 4× (suspension)	Sportovní hala Vodova, Brno; Referees: Horvath, Marton (HUN)

5 July 2012; 19:30	Tunisia	22 – 32	Brazil	Sportovní hala Vodova, Brno; Referees: Mosorinski, Pandzic (SRB)
5 July 2012; 19:30	Hamrouni 6	(12–18)	Rocha 7	Sportovní hala Vodova, Brno; Referees: Mosorinski, Pandzic (SRB)
5 July 2012; 19:30	3× (yellow card) 5× (suspension)	Report	2× (yellow card) 7× (suspension)	Sportovní hala Vodova, Brno; Referees: Mosorinski, Pandzic (SRB)

6 July 2012; 15:00	Norway	34 – 19	Tunisia	Sportovní hala Vodova, Brno; Attendance: 50; Referees: Grillo, Lenci (ARG)
6 July 2012; 15:00	Kristiansen 11	(13–9)	Hamrouni 5	Sportovní hala Vodova, Brno; Attendance: 50; Referees: Grillo, Lenci (ARG)
6 July 2012; 15:00	3× (yellow card) 1× (suspension)	Report	3× (yellow card) 1× (suspension)	Sportovní hala Vodova, Brno; Attendance: 50; Referees: Grillo, Lenci (ARG)

6 July 2012; 17:15	Croatia	33 – 22	Brazil	Sportovní hala Vodova, Brno; Attendance: 50; Referees: Mousavian, Kolahdouzan (IRN)
6 July 2012; 17:15	Vukojević 7	(16–10)	Fais Munhoz Araujo 5	Sportovní hala Vodova, Brno; Attendance: 50; Referees: Mousavian, Kolahdouzan (IRN)
6 July 2012; 17:15	4× (yellow card) 3× (suspension)	Report	2× (yellow card) 1× (suspension)	Sportovní hala Vodova, Brno; Attendance: 50; Referees: Mousavian, Kolahdouzan (IRN)

6 July 2012; 19:30	Netherlands	20 – 22	Romania	Sportovní hala Vodova, Brno; Attendance: 100; Referees: Mosorinski, Pandzic (SRB)
6 July 2012; 19:30	Abbingh, Schoenaker 4	(7–8)	Perianu 6	Sportovní hala Vodova, Brno; Attendance: 100; Referees: Mosorinski, Pandzic (SRB)
6 July 2012; 19:30	3× (yellow card) 1× (suspension)	Report	4× (yellow card) 3× (suspension)	Sportovní hala Vodova, Brno; Attendance: 100; Referees: Mosorinski, Pandzic (SRB)

== Knockout stage ==
=== Championship ===
Round of 16
B1	South Korea	25
A4	Denmark	22
D3	Romania	14
C2	France	20
B3	Czech Republic	16
A2	Hungary	30
D1	Brazil	20
C4	Poland	23
C3	Austria	18
D2	Norway	32
A1	Serbia	37
B4	Congo	19
A3	Spain	24
B2	Sweden	27
C1	Russia	26
D4	Croatia	22

Quarterfinals
B1	South Korea	26
C2	France	30
A2	Hungary	29
C4	Poland	27
D2	Norway	22
A1	Serbia	25
B2	Sweden	27
C1	Russia	26

Semifinals
C2	France	28
A2	Hungary	21
A1	Serbia	25
B2	Sweden	27

Final
C2	France	22
B2	Sweden	29
Third place
A2	Hungary	26
A1	Serbia	24

==== Eighthfinals ====
8 July 2012; 17:30	South Korea	25 – 22	Denmark	Sports hall Ostrava Dubina, Ostrava; Referees: Cacador, Nicolau (POR)
8 July 2012; 17:30	Han 7	(11–10)	Heindahl, Johansen 6	Sports hall Ostrava Dubina, Ostrava; Referees: Cacador, Nicolau (POR)
8 July 2012; 17:30	3× (yellow card) 4× (suspension)	Report	3× (yellow card) 4× (suspension)	Sports hall Ostrava Dubina, Ostrava; Referees: Cacador, Nicolau (POR)

8 July 2012; 17:30	Romania	14 – 20	France	Sportovní hala Vodova, Brno; Attendance: 150; Referees: Mosorinski, Pandzic (SRB)
8 July 2012; 17:30	Ianasi, Florea 3	(5–9)	Zaadi 6	Sportovní hala Vodova, Brno; Attendance: 150; Referees: Mosorinski, Pandzic (SRB)
8 July 2012; 17:30	3× (yellow card) 3× (suspension)	Report	3× (yellow card) 4× (suspension)	Sportovní hala Vodova, Brno; Attendance: 150; Referees: Mosorinski, Pandzic (SRB)

8 July 2012; 17:30	Czech Republic	16 – 30	Hungary	ZS Sareza Ostrava, Ostrava; Referees: Al Mutaw'a, Al Suwailem (KUW)
8 July 2012; 17:30	Marcikova 5	(7–15)	Palkó 9	ZS Sareza Ostrava, Ostrava; Referees: Al Mutaw'a, Al Suwailem (KUW)
8 July 2012; 17:30	2× (yellow card)	Report	2× (yellow card) 3× (suspension)	ZS Sareza Ostrava, Ostrava; Referees: Al Mutaw'a, Al Suwailem (KUW)

8 July 2012; 17:30	Brazil	20 – 23	Poland	Sportovní hala Vodova, Brno; Attendance: 100; Referees: Mousavian, Kolahdouzan (IRN)
8 July 2012; 17:30	Nunes 6	(9–13)	Galinska 7	Sportovní hala Vodova, Brno; Attendance: 100; Referees: Mousavian, Kolahdouzan (IRN)
8 July 2012; 17:30	3× (yellow card) 4× (suspension)	Report	3× (yellow card) 1× (suspension)	Sportovní hala Vodova, Brno; Attendance: 100; Referees: Mousavian, Kolahdouzan (IRN)

8 July 2012; 20:15	Austria	18 – 32	Norway	Sportovní hala Vodova, Brno; Attendance: 100; Referees: Horvath, Marton (HUN)
8 July 2012; 20:15	Frey 7	(8–16)	Breistøl 6	Sportovní hala Vodova, Brno; Attendance: 100; Referees: Horvath, Marton (HUN)
8 July 2012; 20:15	1× (yellow card) 1× (suspension)	Report	3× (yellow card) 1× (suspension)	Sportovní hala Vodova, Brno; Attendance: 100; Referees: Horvath, Marton (HUN)

8 July 2012; 20:15	Serbia	37 – 19	Congo	Sports hall Ostrava Dubina, Ostrava; Referees: El Moamly, El Sayed (EGY)
8 July 2012; 20:15	Filipović 8	(21–9)	Mambou, Zoubabela 5	Sports hall Ostrava Dubina, Ostrava; Referees: El Moamly, El Sayed (EGY)
8 July 2012; 20:15	3× (yellow card) 3× (suspension)	Report	3× (yellow card) 2× (suspension)	Sports hall Ostrava Dubina, Ostrava; Referees: El Moamly, El Sayed (EGY)

8 July 2012; 20:15	Spain	24 – 27	Sweden	ZS Sareza Ostrava, Ostrava; Referees: Eliasson, Gudjonsson (ISL)
8 July 2012; 20:15	Gonzalez Ortega 5	(10–9)	three players 5	ZS Sareza Ostrava, Ostrava; Referees: Eliasson, Gudjonsson (ISL)
8 July 2012; 20:15	3× (yellow card) 5× (suspension)	Report	3× (yellow card) 7× (suspension)	ZS Sareza Ostrava, Ostrava; Referees: Eliasson, Gudjonsson (ISL)

8 July 2012; 20:15	Russia	26 – 22	Croatia	Sportovní hala Vodova, Brno; Attendance: 50; Referees: Grillo, Lenci (ARG)
8 July 2012; 20:15	Chernova 7	(12–9)	Toto 8	Sportovní hala Vodova, Brno; Attendance: 50; Referees: Grillo, Lenci (ARG)
8 July 2012; 20:15	2× (yellow card) 8× (suspension) 1× (red card)	Report	4× (yellow card) 7× (suspension)	Sportovní hala Vodova, Brno; Attendance: 50; Referees: Grillo, Lenci (ARG)

==== Quarterfinals ====
10 July 2012; 12:00	South Korea	26 – 30	France	Sports hall Ostrava Dubina, Ostrava; Referees: Eliasson, Gudjonsson (ISL)
10 July 2012; 12:00	Lee Hyo-Jin, Kim Jin-Yi 6	(13–14)	Zaadi 8	Sports hall Ostrava Dubina, Ostrava; Referees: Eliasson, Gudjonsson (ISL)
10 July 2012; 12:00	3× (yellow card) 3× (suspension)	Report	3× (yellow card) 4× (suspension)	Sports hall Ostrava Dubina, Ostrava; Referees: Eliasson, Gudjonsson (ISL)

10 July 2012; 14:45	Hungary	29 – 27	Poland	Sports hall Ostrava Dubina, Ostrava; Attendance: 100; Referees: Opava, Valek (CZE)
10 July 2012; 14:45	Klivinyi 9	(16–17)	Gadzina 6	Sports hall Ostrava Dubina, Ostrava; Attendance: 100; Referees: Opava, Valek (CZE)
10 July 2012; 14:45	3× (yellow card) 4× (suspension)	Report	2× (yellow card) 3× (suspension)	Sports hall Ostrava Dubina, Ostrava; Attendance: 100; Referees: Opava, Valek (CZE)

10 July 2012; 17:30	Norway	22 – 25	Serbia	Sports hall Ostrava Dubina, Ostrava; Referees: Stark, Stefan (ROU)
10 July 2012; 17:30	Heiberg 5	(12–11)	Georgijev 7	Sports hall Ostrava Dubina, Ostrava; Referees: Stark, Stefan (ROU)
10 July 2012; 17:30	3× (yellow card) 3× (suspension)	Report	2× (yellow card) 5× (suspension)	Sports hall Ostrava Dubina, Ostrava; Referees: Stark, Stefan (ROU)

10 July 2012; 20:15	Sweden	27 – 26	Russia	Sports hall Ostrava Dubina, Ostrava; Referees: Lah, Sok (SLO)
10 July 2012; 20:15	Adler 10	(15–10)	Garanina 7	Sports hall Ostrava Dubina, Ostrava; Referees: Lah, Sok (SLO)
10 July 2012; 20:15	3× (yellow card) 6× (suspension)	Report	3× (yellow card) 4× (suspension) 1× (red card)	Sports hall Ostrava Dubina, Ostrava; Referees: Lah, Sok (SLO)

==== Semifinals ====
12 July 2012; 15:15	France	28 – 21	Hungary	Sports hall Ostrava Dubina, Ostrava; Referees: Stefan, Stark (ROU)
12 July 2012; 15:15	Houette 5	(13–8)	Klivinyi 7	Sports hall Ostrava Dubina, Ostrava; Referees: Stefan, Stark (ROU)
12 July 2012; 15:15	3× (yellow card) 2× (suspension)	Report	3× (yellow card) 2× (suspension)	Sports hall Ostrava Dubina, Ostrava; Referees: Stefan, Stark (ROU)

12 July 2012; 18:00	Serbia	25 – 27	Sweden	Sports hall Ostrava Dubina, Ostrava; Referees: Cacador, Nicolau (POR)
12 July 2012; 18:00	Vasić 7	(10–13)	Adler, Claeson 5	Sports hall Ostrava Dubina, Ostrava; Referees: Cacador, Nicolau (POR)
12 July 2012; 18:00	4× (yellow card) 4× (suspension)	Report	3× (yellow card) 7× (suspension)	Sports hall Ostrava Dubina, Ostrava; Referees: Cacador, Nicolau (POR)

==== Bronze medal game ====
14 July 2012
14:00
Serbia
24 – 26 (ET)
Hungary
Sports hall Ostrava Dubina, Ostrava
Referees: Opava, Valek (CZE)
Popović 7
(8–11)
three players 5
3× (yellow card) 5× (suspension)
Report
2× (yellow card) 4× (suspension) 1× (red card)

FT: 20–20 ET: 4–6

==== Final ====
14 July 2012; 16:45	France	22 – 29	Sweden	Sports hall Ostrava Dubina, Ostrava; Attendance: 1,000; Referees: Mosorinski, Pandzic (SRB)
14 July 2012; 16:45	Abdellahi 5	(7–14)	Tellenmark, Larsson 5	Sports hall Ostrava Dubina, Ostrava; Attendance: 1,000; Referees: Mosorinski, Pandzic (SRB)
14 July 2012; 16:45	3× (yellow card) 5× (suspension)	Report	3× (yellow card) 2× (suspension)	Sports hall Ostrava Dubina, Ostrava; Attendance: 1,000; Referees: Mosorinski, Pandzic (SRB)

=== 5–8th place playoffs ===
Semifinals
11 July
South Korea	25
Poland	23
11 July
Norway	24
Russia	26

Fifth place
13 July
South Korea	28
Russia	31
Seventh place
13 July
Poland	24
Norway	23

==== Semifinals ====
11 July 2012; 16:00	South Korea	25 – 23	Poland	Sports hall Ostrava Sareza, Ostrava; Referees: Mousavian, Kolahdouzan (IRN)
11 July 2012; 16:00	Kim Jin-Yi 7	(10–12)	Zych 8	Sports hall Ostrava Sareza, Ostrava; Referees: Mousavian, Kolahdouzan (IRN)
11 July 2012; 16:00	3× (yellow card) 5× (suspension)	Report	3× (yellow card) 3× (suspension)	Sports hall Ostrava Sareza, Ostrava; Referees: Mousavian, Kolahdouzan (IRN)

11 July 2012; 18:00	Norway	24 – 26	Russia	Sports hall Ostrava Sareza, Ostrava; Referees: Eliasson, Gudjonsson (ISL)
11 July 2012; 18:00	Heiberg, Bjørnsen 5	(12–17)	Dmitrieva, Milova 6	Sports hall Ostrava Sareza, Ostrava; Referees: Eliasson, Gudjonsson (ISL)
11 July 2012; 18:00	4× (yellow card) 2× (suspension)	Report	3× (yellow card) 5× (suspension)	Sports hall Ostrava Sareza, Ostrava; Referees: Eliasson, Gudjonsson (ISL)

==== Seventh place game ====
13 July 2012; 16:00	Poland	24 – 23	Norway	Sports hall Ostrava Sareza, Ostrava; Attendance: 100; Referees: Lah, Sok (SLO)
13 July 2012; 16:00	Zych 5	(12–14)	Hansen 5	Sports hall Ostrava Sareza, Ostrava; Attendance: 100; Referees: Lah, Sok (SLO)
13 July 2012; 16:00	4× (yellow card)	Report	3× (yellow card) 6× (suspension)	Sports hall Ostrava Sareza, Ostrava; Attendance: 100; Referees: Lah, Sok (SLO)

==== Fifth place game ====
13 July 2012; 18:00	South Korea	28 – 31	Russia	Sports hall Ostrava Sareza, Ostrava; Attendance: 100; Referees: Leszczynski, Piechota (POL)
13 July 2012; 18:00	Kim Jin-Yi 13	(15–16)	Chernova 7	Sports hall Ostrava Sareza, Ostrava; Attendance: 100; Referees: Leszczynski, Piechota (POL)
13 July 2012; 18:00	3× (yellow card) 1× (suspension)	Report	3× (yellow card) 5× (suspension)	Sports hall Ostrava Sareza, Ostrava; Attendance: 100; Referees: Leszczynski, Piechota (POL)

=== 9th–16th place playoffs ===
Quarterfinals
A4	Denmark	30
D3	Romania	21
B3	Czech Republic	21
D1	Brazil	28
C3	Austria	36
B4	Congo	15
A3	Spain	21
D4	Croatia	22

Semifinals
A4	Denmark	36
D1	Brazil	26
C3	Austria	21
D4	Croatia	30

Ninth place
A4	Denmark	28
D4	Croatia	27
Eleventh place
D1	Brazil	24
C3	Austria	29

==== Quarterfinals ====
10 July 2012; 14:00	Denmark	30 – 21	Romania	Sportovní hala Vodova, Brno; Attendance: 100; Referees: Horvath, Marton (HUN)
10 July 2012; 14:00	Poulsen 12	(15–9)	Ianasi, Perianu 4	Sportovní hala Vodova, Brno; Attendance: 100; Referees: Horvath, Marton (HUN)
10 July 2012; 14:00	3× (yellow card) 2× (suspension)	Report	4× (yellow card) 4× (suspension)	Sportovní hala Vodova, Brno; Attendance: 100; Referees: Horvath, Marton (HUN)

10 July 2012; 16:00	Czech Republic	21 – 28	Brazil	Sportovní hala Vodova, Brno; Attendance: 250; Referees: Lythje, Christiansen (DEN)
10 July 2012; 16:00	Weisenbilderova 10	(9–12)	Batista da Silva 5	Sportovní hala Vodova, Brno; Attendance: 250; Referees: Lythje, Christiansen (DEN)
10 July 2012; 16:00	3× (yellow card) 3× (suspension) 1× (red card)	Report	3× (yellow card) 2× (suspension)	Sportovní hala Vodova, Brno; Attendance: 250; Referees: Lythje, Christiansen (DEN)

10 July 2012; 18:00	Austria	36 – 15	Congo	Sports hall Ostrava Dubina, Ostrava; Attendance: 100; Referees: Li, Wang (CHN)
10 July 2012; 18:00	Ramsebner 7	(21–4)	Divoko Divoko 4	Sports hall Ostrava Dubina, Ostrava; Attendance: 100; Referees: Li, Wang (CHN)
10 July 2012; 18:00	3× (yellow card) 1× (suspension)	Report	3× (yellow card) 3× (suspension)	Sports hall Ostrava Dubina, Ostrava; Attendance: 100; Referees: Li, Wang (CHN)

10 July 2012; 20:00	Spain	21 – 22	Croatia	Sportovní hala Vodova, Brno; Attendance: 100; Referees: Gonzalez, Prieto (URU)
10 July 2012; 20:00	Gonzalez Ortega 5	(10–14)	Covič, Milič 5	Sportovní hala Vodova, Brno; Attendance: 100; Referees: Gonzalez, Prieto (URU)
10 July 2012; 20:00	4× (yellow card) 5× (suspension)	Report	4× (yellow card) 6× (suspension)	Sportovní hala Vodova, Brno; Attendance: 100; Referees: Gonzalez, Prieto (URU)

==== Semifinals ====
11 July 2012; 12:00	Denmark	36 – 26	Brazil	Sportovní hala Vodova, Brno; Attendance: 100; Referees: Mosorinski, Pandzic (SRB)
11 July 2012; 12:00	four players	(20–13)	Nunes 7	Sportovní hala Vodova, Brno; Attendance: 100; Referees: Mosorinski, Pandzic (SRB)
11 July 2012; 12:00	3× (yellow card) 3× (suspension)	Report	2× (yellow card) 4× (suspension)	Sportovní hala Vodova, Brno; Attendance: 100; Referees: Mosorinski, Pandzic (SRB)

11 July 2012; 14:00	Austria	21 – 30	Croatia	Sportovní hala Vodova, Brno; Attendance: 100; Referees: Horvath, Marton (HUN)
11 July 2012; 14:00	Frey 9	(12–13)	Vidak 8	Sportovní hala Vodova, Brno; Attendance: 100; Referees: Horvath, Marton (HUN)
11 July 2012; 14:00	4× (yellow card) 3× (suspension)	Report	2× (yellow card) 2× (suspension)	Sportovní hala Vodova, Brno; Attendance: 100; Referees: Horvath, Marton (HUN)

==== Eleventh place game ====
13 July 2012; 18:00	Brazil	24 – 29	Austria	Sports hall Ostrava Dubina, Ostrava; Attendance: 100; Referees: Grillo, Lenci (ARG)
13 July 2012; 18:00	Malta Varela 9	(10–12)	Frey	Sports hall Ostrava Dubina, Ostrava; Attendance: 100; Referees: Grillo, Lenci (ARG)
13 July 2012; 18:00	3× (yellow card) 1× (suspension)	Report	3× (yellow card)	Sports hall Ostrava Dubina, Ostrava; Attendance: 100; Referees: Grillo, Lenci (ARG)

==== Ninth place game ====
13 July 2012
20:00
Denmark
28 – 27 (ET)
Croatia
Sports hall Ostrava Dubina, Ostrava
Attendance: 100
Referees: Horvath, Marton (HUN)
Nielsen 5
(8–11)
Toto 8
2× (yellow card)
Report
3× (yellow card) 4× (suspension)

FT: 20–20 ET: 8–7

=== 13th–16th place playoffs ===
Semifinals
11 July
Romania	30
Czech Republic	23
11 July
Congo	18
Spain	34

13th place
13 July
Romania	29
Spain	28
15th place
13 July
Czech Republic	28
Congo	18

==== Semifinals ====
11 July 2012; 16:00	Romania	30 – 23	Czech Republic	Sportovní hala Vodova, Brno; Attendance: 100; Referees: Gonzalez, Prieto (URU)
11 July 2012; 16:00	Ianasi 9	(14–10)	Kubackova, Pokorna 6	Sportovní hala Vodova, Brno; Attendance: 100; Referees: Gonzalez, Prieto (URU)
11 July 2012; 16:00	4× (yellow card) 6× (suspension)	Report	2× (yellow card) 6× (suspension)	Sportovní hala Vodova, Brno; Attendance: 100; Referees: Gonzalez, Prieto (URU)

11 July 2012; 18:00	Congo	18 – 34	Spain	Sportovní hala Vodova, Brno; Attendance: 50; Referees: Grillo, Lenci (ARG)
11 July 2012; 18:00	Zoubabela 11	(8–16)	Gonzalez Ortega 7	Sportovní hala Vodova, Brno; Attendance: 50; Referees: Grillo, Lenci (ARG)
11 July 2012; 18:00	3× (yellow card) 3× (suspension)	Report	2× (yellow card) 3× (suspension)	Sportovní hala Vodova, Brno; Attendance: 50; Referees: Grillo, Lenci (ARG)

==== 15th place game ====
13 July 2012; 14:00	Czech Republic	28 – 18	Congo	Sportovní hala Vodova, Ostrava; Attendance: 100; Referees: Li, Wang (CHN)
13 July 2012; 14:00	Weisenbilderova 8	(10–11)	Zoubabela 7	Sportovní hala Vodova, Ostrava; Attendance: 100; Referees: Li, Wang (CHN)
13 July 2012; 14:00	3× (yellow card) 1× (suspension)	Report	3× (yellow card) 4× (suspension)	Sportovní hala Vodova, Ostrava; Attendance: 100; Referees: Li, Wang (CHN)

==== 13th place game ====
13 July 2012; 16:00	Romania	29 – 28	Spain	Sportovní hala Vodova, Ostrava; Attendance: 100; Referees: Lythja, Christiansen (DEN)
13 July 2012; 16:00	Buceschi 11	(13–16)	Gonzalez Ortega 10	Sportovní hala Vodova, Ostrava; Attendance: 100; Referees: Lythja, Christiansen (DEN)
13 July 2012; 16:00	4× (yellow card) 5× (suspension) 1× (red card)	Report	3× (yellow card) 5× (suspension) 1× (red card)	Sportovní hala Vodova, Ostrava; Attendance: 100; Referees: Lythja, Christiansen (DEN)

=== 17–20th place playoffs ===
Semifinals
8 July
Uruguay	30
Argentina	29
8 July
Angola	29
Netherlands	34

17th place
10 July
Uruguay	30
Netherlands	47
19th place
10 July
Argentina	11
Angola	22

==== Semifinals ====
8 July 2012; 15:30	Uruguay	30 – 29	Argentina	Sports hall Ostrava Dubina, Ostrava; Referees: Lah, Sok (SLO)
8 July 2012; 15:30	Scarrone 6	(18–12)	Campigli, Vico 5	Sports hall Ostrava Dubina, Ostrava; Referees: Lah, Sok (SLO)
8 July 2012; 15:30	4× (yellow card) 3× (suspension)	Report	3× (yellow card) 4× (suspension)	Sports hall Ostrava Dubina, Ostrava; Referees: Lah, Sok (SLO)

8 July 2012; 15:30	Angola	29 – 34	Netherlands	Sportovní hala Vodova, Brno; Attendance: 100; Referees: Li Wang (CHN)
8 July 2012; 15:30	Jocelina 9	(13–17)	Prak, Malestein 7	Sportovní hala Vodova, Brno; Attendance: 100; Referees: Li Wang (CHN)
8 July 2012; 15:30	4× (yellow card) 1× (suspension)	Report	3× (yellow card) 1× (suspension)	Sportovní hala Vodova, Brno; Attendance: 100; Referees: Li Wang (CHN)

==== 19th place game ====
10 July 2012; 18:00	Angola	22 – 11	Argentina	Sports hall Ostrava Dubina, Ostrava; Referees: Al Mutaw'a, Al Suwailem (KUW)
10 July 2012; 18:00	Juliana 6	(10–4)	Ocanto 4	Sports hall Ostrava Dubina, Ostrava; Referees: Al Mutaw'a, Al Suwailem (KUW)
10 July 2012; 18:00	3× (yellow card) 1× (suspension)	Report	3× (yellow card) 3× (suspension)	Sports hall Ostrava Dubina, Ostrava; Referees: Al Mutaw'a, Al Suwailem (KUW)

==== 17th place game ====
10 July 2012; 20:00	Netherlands	47 – 30	Uruguay	Sports hall Ostrava Dubina, Ostrava; Referees: Mousavian, Kalohdouzan (IRN)
10 July 2012; 20:00	Michielsen, Abbingh 8	(21–14)	Scarrone 12	Sports hall Ostrava Dubina, Ostrava; Referees: Mousavian, Kalohdouzan (IRN)
10 July 2012; 20:00	3× (yellow card) 6× (suspension)	Report	3× (yellow card) 2× (suspension)	Sports hall Ostrava Dubina, Ostrava; Referees: Mousavian, Kalohdouzan (IRN)

=== 21–24th place playoffs ===
Semifinals
8 July
China	28
Kazakhstan	27
8 July
Japan	32
Tunisia	22

21st place
10 July
China	21
Japan	34
23rd place
10 July
Kazakhstan	33
Tunisia	41

==== Semifinals ====
8 July 2012; 15:30	China	28 – 27	Kazakhstan	ZS Sareza Ostrava, Ostrava; Referees: Leszczynski, Piechota (POL)
8 July 2012; 15:30	Li Xiaoqing, Jin Mengqing 5	(15–16)	Aleksandrova 9	ZS Sareza Ostrava, Ostrava; Referees: Leszczynski, Piechota (POL)
8 July 2012; 15:30	3× (yellow card) 3× (suspension)	Report	3× (yellow card) 3× (suspension)	ZS Sareza Ostrava, Ostrava; Referees: Leszczynski, Piechota (POL)

8 July 2012; 15:30	Japan	32 – 22	Tunisia	Sportovní hala Vodova, Brno; Attendance: 50; Referees: Gonazlez, Prieto (URU)
8 July 2012; 15:30	Takamiya, Morimoto 6	(15–13)	Chekir, Dhaouadi 6	Sportovní hala Vodova, Brno; Attendance: 50; Referees: Gonazlez, Prieto (URU)
8 July 2012; 15:30	3× (yellow card) 3× (suspension)	Report	4× (yellow card) 1× (suspension)	Sportovní hala Vodova, Brno; Attendance: 50; Referees: Gonazlez, Prieto (URU)

==== 23rd place game ====
10 July 2012; 14:00	Kazakhstan	33 – 41	Tunisia	Sports hall Ostrava Dubina, Ostrava; Referees: Cacador, Nicolau (POR)
10 July 2012; 14:00	Aleksandrova 8	(14–21)	Dhaouadi 13	Sports hall Ostrava Dubina, Ostrava; Referees: Cacador, Nicolau (POR)
10 July 2012; 14:00	3× (yellow card) 5× (suspension)	Report	3× (yellow card) 2× (suspension)	Sports hall Ostrava Dubina, Ostrava; Referees: Cacador, Nicolau (POR)

==== 21st place game ====
10 July 2012; 16:00	China	21 – 34	Japan	Sports hall Ostrava Dubina, Ostrava; Referees: El Moamly, El Sayed (EGY)
10 July 2012; 16:00	Wu Zuoyang 5	(8–20)	Watanabe, Takeshita 9	Sports hall Ostrava Dubina, Ostrava; Referees: El Moamly, El Sayed (EGY)
10 July 2012; 16:00	3× (yellow card) 7× (suspension)	Report	4× (yellow card) 1× (suspension)	Sports hall Ostrava Dubina, Ostrava; Referees: El Moamly, El Sayed (EGY)

== Ranking and statistics ==
=== Final ranking ===
Rank	Team
Gold medal	Sweden
Silver medal	France
Bronze medal	Hungary
4	Serbia
5	Russia
6	South Korea
7	Poland
8	Norway
9	Denmark
10	Croatia
11	Austria
12	Brazil
13	Romania
14	Spain
15	Czech Republic
16	Congo
17	Netherlands
18	Uruguay
19	Angola
20	Argentina
21	Japan
22	China
23	Tunisia
24	Kazakhstan

=== Awards ===
MVP

- Lee Hyo-Jin (KOR)

Topscorer

- Kinga Klivinyi (HUN) (67 goals)

All-star team

- Goalkeeper: Laura Glauser (FRA)
- Left wing: Louise Sand (SWE)
- Left back: Maria Adler (SWE)
- Pivot: Natalija Vasić (SRB)
- Centre back: Kinga Klivinyi (HUN)
- Right back: Anna Vyakhireva (RUS)
- Right wing: Pauline Coatanea (FRA)

Chosen by team officials and IHF experts: IHF.info

=== Statistics ===
==== Topscorers ====
Rank	Name	Team	Goals	Shots	%
1	Kinga Klivinyi	Hungary	67	136	49.3%
2	Kim Jin-Yi	South Korea	64	116	55.2%
3	Mila Toto	Croatia	62	111	55.9%
4	Lara González Ortega	Spain	59	94	62.8%
5	Eliza Buceschi	Romania	58	97	59.8%
6	Karla Ivancok	Austria	58	98	59.2%
7	Emilia Galisnka	Poland	53	101	52.5%
8	Sonja Frey	Austria	50	96	52.1%
9	Deborah Nunes	Brazil	46	74	62.2%
10	Aleksandra Zych	Poland	46	78	59.0%

Source: ihf.info

==== Top goalkeepers ====
Rank	Name	Team	Saves	Shots	%
1	Jovana Risović	Serbia	144	301	47.8%
2	Laura Glauser	France	132	298	44.3%
3	Bettina Pásztor	Hungary	120	255	47.1%
4	Marie Tømmerbakke	Norway	105	243	43.2%
5	Verena Flöck	Austria	102	297	34.3%
6	Antonija Jukić	Croatia	97	240	40.4%
7	Hanna Daglund	Sweden	94	219	42.9%
8	Marta Wawrzynkowska	Poland	93	243	38.3%
9	Cecilie Greve	Denmark	77	221	34.8%
10	Patricia Encinas	Spain	76	193	39.4%

Source: ihf.info
