= 2010 Women's Youth World Handball Championship =

2010 Youth World Championship

Tournament details
- Host country: Dominican Republic
- Venues: 2 (in 1 host city)
- Dates: August 2–12
- Teams: 20 (from 4 confederations)

Final positions
- Champions: Sweden (1st title)
- Runners-up: Norway
- Third place: Netherlands
- Fourth place: France

Tournament statistics
- Matches played: 64
- Goals scored: 3,265 (51.02 per match)
- Top scorer: (Netherlands) Lois Abbingh (56)

Awards
- Best player: (Sweden) Carin Stromberg

The 2010 IHF Women's Youth World Championship was the third edition and took place at Santo Domingo in the Dominican Republic from August 2–12. The defending champion was Russia. Sweden won the title this year.

== Preliminary round ==
Top 2 teams from each group advanced to the Quarterfinals, while the third placed team from each group competed for the places 9–12, the fourth placed teams for the place 13-16 and fifth placed team of each group for the place 17–20.

=== Group A ===
Team	Pld	W	D	L	GF	GA	GD	Pts	Qualification
Netherlands	4	4	0	0	133	104	+29	8	Quarterfinals
Denmark	4	3	0	1	104	79	+25	6	Quarterfinals
Angola	4	1	1	2	94	108	−14	3	9–12 places
Germany	4	1	0	3	104	96	+8	2	13–16 places
Argentina	4	0	1	3	76	124	−48	1	17–20 places

All times are local UTC-4

2 August; 16:00	Netherlands	33 – 20	Argentina	Handball Pavilion, Santo Domingo; Referees: Kostecki, Crnojevic (CRO)
2 August; 16:00	Abbing, Tamara V.d.P., Malestein 5	(17–9)	Mosciaro 5	Handball Pavilion, Santo Domingo; Referees: Kostecki, Crnojevic (CRO)
2 August; 16:00	3× (yellow card) 3× (suspension)	Report	2× (yellow card) 6× (suspension)	Handball Pavilion, Santo Domingo; Referees: Kostecki, Crnojevic (CRO)

2 August; 18:00	Angola	23 – 22	Germany	Handball Pavilion, Santo Domingo; Referees: Kliko, Johansson (SWE)
2 August; 18:00	Kanka 6	(10–9)	E. Minevskaja 7	Handball Pavilion, Santo Domingo; Referees: Kliko, Johansson (SWE)
2 August; 18:00	3× (yellow card) 9× (suspension) 2× (red card)	Report	1× (yellow card) 11× (suspension)	Handball Pavilion, Santo Domingo; Referees: Kliko, Johansson (SWE)

3 August; 14:00	Denmark	29 – 19	Argentina	Handball Pavilion, Santo Domingo; Attendance: 100; Referees: Chaouch, Abid (TUN)
3 August; 14:00	Heindahl, Burgaard 6	(14–8)	Vico 7	Handball Pavilion, Santo Domingo; Attendance: 100; Referees: Chaouch, Abid (TUN)
3 August; 14:00	3× (yellow card) 6× (suspension)	Report	3× (yellow card) 4× (suspension)	Handball Pavilion, Santo Domingo; Attendance: 100; Referees: Chaouch, Abid (TUN)

3 August; 16:00	Germany	28 – 34	Netherlands	Handball Pavilion, Santo Domingo; Attendance: 100; Referees: Wyss, Zowa (SUI)
3 August; 16:00	Hummel 6	(9–21)	T. van der Pijl 10	Handball Pavilion, Santo Domingo; Attendance: 100; Referees: Wyss, Zowa (SUI)
3 August; 16:00	3× (yellow card) 8× (suspension) 1× (red card)	Report	3× (yellow card) 4× (suspension)	Handball Pavilion, Santo Domingo; Attendance: 100; Referees: Wyss, Zowa (SUI)

4 August; 18:00	Angola	15 – 25	Denmark	Handball Pavilion, Santo Domingo; Attendance: 100; Referees: Pandzic, Mosorinski (SRB)
4 August; 18:00	Kanka 7	(6–16)	Burgaard 8	Handball Pavilion, Santo Domingo; Attendance: 100; Referees: Pandzic, Mosorinski (SRB)
4 August; 18:00	3× (yellow card) 4× (suspension)	Report	3× (yellow card) 4× (suspension)	Handball Pavilion, Santo Domingo; Attendance: 100; Referees: Pandzic, Mosorinski (SRB)

5 August; 16:00	Netherlands	37 – 32	Angola	Handball Pavilion, Santo Domingo; Attendance: 100; Referees: Kliko, Johansson (SWE)
5 August; 16:00	Abbingh 14	(17–13)	Barros 8	Handball Pavilion, Santo Domingo; Attendance: 100; Referees: Kliko, Johansson (SWE)
5 August; 16:00	2× (yellow card) 4× (suspension)	Report	3× (yellow card) 4× (suspension)	Handball Pavilion, Santo Domingo; Attendance: 100; Referees: Kliko, Johansson (SWE)

5 August; 18:00	Argentina	13 – 38	Germany	Handball Pavilion, Santo Domingo; Attendance: 100; Referees: Gullaksen, Arntsen (NOR)
5 August; 18:00	Hoh, Ocanto 3	(4–16)	Hummel, Hertlein 5	Handball Pavilion, Santo Domingo; Attendance: 100; Referees: Gullaksen, Arntsen (NOR)
5 August; 18:00	2× (yellow card) 1× (suspension)	Report	2× (yellow card) 5× (suspension)	Handball Pavilion, Santo Domingo; Attendance: 100; Referees: Gullaksen, Arntsen (NOR)

6 August; 18:00	Germany	16 – 26	Denmark	Handball Pavilion, Santo Domingo; Attendance: 100; Referees: Golus Szubelak, Novak (USA)
6 August; 18:00	Stonawski 5	(8–11)	Heindahl 6	Handball Pavilion, Santo Domingo; Attendance: 100; Referees: Golus Szubelak, Novak (USA)
6 August; 18:00	2× (yellow card) 1× (suspension)	Report	3× (yellow card)	Handball Pavilion, Santo Domingo; Attendance: 100; Referees: Golus Szubelak, Novak (USA)

7 August; 16:00	Denmark	24 – 29	Netherlands	Handball Pavilion, Santo Domingo; Attendance: 100; Referees: Marin Lorente, Serradilla (ESP)
7 August; 16:00	Burgaard 5	(10–18)	Abbingh 9	Handball Pavilion, Santo Domingo; Attendance: 100; Referees: Marin Lorente, Serradilla (ESP)
7 August; 16:00	3× (yellow card) 2× (suspension)	Report	3× (yellow card) 1× (suspension)	Handball Pavilion, Santo Domingo; Attendance: 100; Referees: Marin Lorente, Serradilla (ESP)

7 August; 18:00	Argentina	24 – 24	Angola	Handball Pavilion, Santo Domingo; Attendance: 100; Referees: Mousavian, Taghavi (IRI)
7 August; 18:00	Iacoi 8	(13–11)	Kanka 5	Handball Pavilion, Santo Domingo; Attendance: 100; Referees: Mousavian, Taghavi (IRI)
7 August; 18:00	3× (yellow card) 3× (suspension)	Report	3× (yellow card) 9× (suspension) 2× (red card)	Handball Pavilion, Santo Domingo; Attendance: 100; Referees: Mousavian, Taghavi (IRI)

=== Group B ===
Team	Pld	W	D	L	GF	GA	GD	Pts	Qualification
Norway	3	3	0	0	99	80	+19	6	Quarterfinals
Dominican Republic	3	1	0	2	87	79	+8	2	Quarterfinals
Uruguay	3	1	0	2	89	101	−12	2	9–12 places
Japan	3	1	0	2	84	99	−15	2	13–16 places

- Ivory Coast withdrew from this Youth World Championship and all matches in which was scheduled to play will be canceled without evaluation.

All times are local UTC-4

2 August; 14:00	Japan	34 – 27	Uruguay	Handball Pavilion, Santo Domingo; Attendance: 100; Referees: Wyss, Zowa (SUI)
2 August; 14:00	Koseki 9	(12–13)	Cura 5	Handball Pavilion, Santo Domingo; Attendance: 100; Referees: Wyss, Zowa (SUI)
2 August; 14:00	2× (yellow card) 3× (suspension)	Report	3× (yellow card) 4× (suspension)	Handball Pavilion, Santo Domingo; Attendance: 100; Referees: Wyss, Zowa (SUI)

3 August; 20:00	Uruguay	33 – 26	Dominican Republic	Handball Pavilion, Santo Domingo; Attendance: 200; Referees: Golus Szubelak, Novak (USA)
3 August; 20:00	Saiz 8	(8–13)	Cespedes 9	Handball Pavilion, Santo Domingo; Attendance: 200; Referees: Golus Szubelak, Novak (USA)
3 August; 20:00	3× (yellow card) 1× (suspension)	Report	3× (yellow card)	Handball Pavilion, Santo Domingo; Attendance: 200; Referees: Golus Szubelak, Novak (USA)

4 August; 20:00	Japan	28 – 34	Norway	Handball Pavilion, Santo Domingo; Attendance: 100; Referees: Mousavian, Taghavi (IRI)
4 August; 20:00	Hayashi 8	(8–12)	Wahlquist 7	Handball Pavilion, Santo Domingo; Attendance: 100; Referees: Mousavian, Taghavi (IRI)
4 August; 20:00	3× (yellow card) 1× (suspension)	Report	2× (yellow card) 5× (suspension)	Handball Pavilion, Santo Domingo; Attendance: 100; Referees: Mousavian, Taghavi (IRI)

5 August; 20:00	Dominican Republic	38 – 22	Japan	Handball Pavilion, Santo Domingo; Attendance: 400; Referees: Kostecki, Crnojevic (CRO)
5 August; 20:00	Tejeda 12	(17–12)	Kawabata 6	Handball Pavilion, Santo Domingo; Attendance: 400; Referees: Kostecki, Crnojevic (CRO)
5 August; 20:00	3× (yellow card) 3× (suspension)	Report	3× (yellow card) 3× (suspension)	Handball Pavilion, Santo Domingo; Attendance: 400; Referees: Kostecki, Crnojevic (CRO)

6 August; 20:00	Uruguay	29 – 41	Norway	Handball Pavilion, Santo Domingo; Attendance: 150; Referees: Simsek, Unlu (TUR)
6 August; 20:00	A. Colamonici 6	(12–21)	Wahlquist, Skogrand 6	Handball Pavilion, Santo Domingo; Attendance: 150; Referees: Simsek, Unlu (TUR)
6 August; 20:00	3× (yellow card) 3× (suspension)	Report	3× (yellow card) 5× (suspension)	Handball Pavilion, Santo Domingo; Attendance: 150; Referees: Simsek, Unlu (TUR)

7 August; 20:00	Norway	24 – 23	Dominican Republic	Handball Pavilion, Santo Domingo; Attendance: 600; Referees: Wyss, Zowa (SUI)
7 August; 20:00	Skogrand 6	(10–11)	Lopez 9	Handball Pavilion, Santo Domingo; Attendance: 600; Referees: Wyss, Zowa (SUI)
7 August; 20:00	3× (yellow card) 1× (suspension)	Report	2× (yellow card) 4× (suspension)	Handball Pavilion, Santo Domingo; Attendance: 600; Referees: Wyss, Zowa (SUI)

=== Group C ===
Team	Pld	W	D	L	GF	GA	GD	Pts	Qualification
Sweden	4	4	0	0	151	90	+61	8	Quarterfinals
France	4	2	1	1	125	85	+40	5	Quarterfinals
Hungary	4	2	1	1	135	98	+37	5	9–12 places
Kazakhstan	4	1	0	3	84	151	−67	2	13–16 places
DR Congo	4	0	0	4	74	145	−71	0	17–20 places

All times are local UTC-4

2 August; 16:00	Sweden	44 – 18	DR Congo	Palacio de los Deportes, Santo Domingo; Attendance: 300; Referees: Gonzales, Prieto (URU)
2 August; 16:00	Tellenmark, Claeson 6	(22–9)	Betu Mvita 8	Palacio de los Deportes, Santo Domingo; Attendance: 300; Referees: Gonzales, Prieto (URU)
2 August; 16:00	3× (yellow card) 2× (suspension)	Report	3× (yellow card) 6× (suspension)	Palacio de los Deportes, Santo Domingo; Attendance: 300; Referees: Gonzales, Prieto (URU)

3 August; 14:00	France	49 – 18	Kazakhstan	Palacio de los Deportes, Santo Domingo; Attendance: 100; Referees: Crnojevic, Kostecki (CRO)
3 August; 14:00	C. Rassinoux 9	(20–7)	L. Yevgeniya 4	Palacio de los Deportes, Santo Domingo; Attendance: 100; Referees: Crnojevic, Kostecki (CRO)
3 August; 14:00	3× (yellow card) 4× (suspension)	Report	2× (yellow card) 11× (suspension) 3× (red card)	Palacio de los Deportes, Santo Domingo; Attendance: 100; Referees: Crnojevic, Kostecki (CRO)

3 August; 16:00	DR Congo	23 – 40	Hungary	Palacio de los Deportes, Santo Domingo; Attendance: 100; Referees: Unlu, Simsek (TUR)
3 August; 16:00	Betu Mvita 8	(12–18)	Tóth 8	Palacio de los Deportes, Santo Domingo; Attendance: 100; Referees: Unlu, Simsek (TUR)
3 August; 16:00	3× (yellow card) 14× (suspension) 3× (red card)	Report	2× (yellow card) 9× (suspension)	Palacio de los Deportes, Santo Domingo; Attendance: 100; Referees: Unlu, Simsek (TUR)

4 August; 16:00	Hungary	42 – 16	Kazakhstan	Palacio de los Deportes, Santo Domingo; Referees: Golus Szubelak, Novak (USA)
4 August; 16:00	Takacs, S. Plantea 7	(19–7)	L. Yevgeniya 6	Palacio de los Deportes, Santo Domingo; Referees: Golus Szubelak, Novak (USA)
4 August; 16:00	3× (yellow card) 1× (suspension)	Report	2× (yellow card) 3× (suspension) 1× (red card)	Palacio de los Deportes, Santo Domingo; Referees: Golus Szubelak, Novak (USA)

4 August; 18:00	Sweden	31 – 18	France	Palacio de los Deportes, Santo Domingo; Attendance: 100; Referees: Marin Lorente, Serradilla (ESP)
4 August; 18:00	Larsson 7	(13–11)	S. Abdellahi 3	Palacio de los Deportes, Santo Domingo; Attendance: 100; Referees: Marin Lorente, Serradilla (ESP)
4 August; 18:00	3× (yellow card) 1× (suspension)	Report	3× (yellow card) 1× (suspension)	Palacio de los Deportes, Santo Domingo; Attendance: 100; Referees: Marin Lorente, Serradilla (ESP)

5 August; 14:00	Hungary	30 – 36	Sweden	Palacio de los Deportes, Santo Domingo; Attendance: 100; Referees: Mosorinski, Pandzic (SRB)
5 August; 14:00	Szekerczes, S. Planeta, Klivinyi 5	(13–22)	Adler 7	Palacio de los Deportes, Santo Domingo; Attendance: 100; Referees: Mosorinski, Pandzic (SRB)
5 August; 14:00	3× (yellow card) 1× (suspension)	Report	3× (yellow card) 7× (suspension)	Palacio de los Deportes, Santo Domingo; Attendance: 100; Referees: Mosorinski, Pandzic (SRB)

5 August; 16:00	Kazakhstan	26 – 20	DR Congo	Palacio de los Deportes, Santo Domingo; Attendance: 100; Referees: Wyss, Zowa (SUI)
5 August; 16:00	L. Yevgeniya 13	(11–10)	Beut, Ngatse 6	Palacio de los Deportes, Santo Domingo; Attendance: 100; Referees: Wyss, Zowa (SUI)
5 August; 16:00	3× (yellow card) 4× (suspension)	Report	3× (yellow card) 6× (suspension)	Palacio de los Deportes, Santo Domingo; Attendance: 100; Referees: Wyss, Zowa (SUI)

6 August; 18:00	DR Congo	13 – 35	France	Palacio de los Deportes, Santo Domingo; Attendance: 100; Referees: Crnojevic, Kostecki (CRO)
6 August; 18:00	Betu 5	(6–13)	Ngo, C. Lassource 6	Palacio de los Deportes, Santo Domingo; Attendance: 100; Referees: Crnojevic, Kostecki (CRO)
6 August; 18:00	2× (yellow card) 4× (suspension)	Report	2× (yellow card) 3× (suspension)	Palacio de los Deportes, Santo Domingo; Attendance: 100; Referees: Crnojevic, Kostecki (CRO)

7 August; 14:00	France	23 – 23	Hungary	Palacio de los Deportes, Santo Domingo; Referees: Johansson, Kliko (SWE)
7 August; 14:00	Audrey Bruneau 10	(12–9)	Kinga Klivinyi 7	Palacio de los Deportes, Santo Domingo; Referees: Johansson, Kliko (SWE)
7 August; 14:00	3× (yellow card) 3× (suspension)	Report	3× (yellow card) 5× (suspension)	Palacio de los Deportes, Santo Domingo; Referees: Johansson, Kliko (SWE)

7 August; 16:00	Kazakhstan	24 – 40	Sweden	Palacio de los Deportes, Santo Domingo; Attendance: 100; Referees: Gonzalez, Prieto (URU)
7 August; 16:00	L. Yevgeniya 7	(8–19)	Claeson 8	Palacio de los Deportes, Santo Domingo; Attendance: 100; Referees: Gonzalez, Prieto (URU)
7 August; 16:00	2× (yellow card) 3× (suspension)	Report	2× (yellow card) 3× (suspension)	Palacio de los Deportes, Santo Domingo; Attendance: 100; Referees: Gonzalez, Prieto (URU)

=== Group D ===
Team	Pld	W	D	L	GF	GA	GD	Pts	Qualification
Russia	4	4	0	0	154	101	+53	8	Quarterfinals
Spain	4	3	0	1	143	103	+40	6	Quarterfinals
South Korea	4	2	0	2	135	105	+30	4	9–12 places
Brazil	4	1	0	3	119	105	+14	2	13–16 places
Thailand	4	0	0	4	72	209	−137	0	17–20 places

All times are local UTC-4

2 August; 18:00	South Korea	26 – 27	Spain	Palacio de los Deportes, Santo Domingo; Attendance: 100; Referees: Arntsen, Gullaksen (NOR)
2 August; 18:00	Kim Jungeun 8	(11–18)	Gonzalez 10	Palacio de los Deportes, Santo Domingo; Attendance: 100; Referees: Arntsen, Gullaksen (NOR)
2 August; 18:00	3× (yellow card) 6× (suspension)	Report	3× (yellow card) 4× (suspension)	Palacio de los Deportes, Santo Domingo; Attendance: 100; Referees: Arntsen, Gullaksen (NOR)

2 August; 20:00	Brazil	42 – 13	Thailand	Palacio de los Deportes, Santo Domingo; Attendance: 100; Referees: Abid, Chaouch (TUN)
2 August; 20:00	Araujo 7	(19–4)	Piman 4	Palacio de los Deportes, Santo Domingo; Attendance: 100; Referees: Abid, Chaouch (TUN)
2 August; 20:00	3× (yellow card) 3× (suspension)	Report	3× (yellow card) 3× (suspension)	Palacio de los Deportes, Santo Domingo; Attendance: 100; Referees: Abid, Chaouch (TUN)

3 August; 18:00	Russia	31 – 28	Spain	Palacio de los Deportes, Santo Domingo; Attendance: 100; Referees: Mosorinski, Pandzic (SRB)
3 August; 18:00	Vyakhireva 9	(13–13)	Gonzalez 11	Palacio de los Deportes, Santo Domingo; Attendance: 100; Referees: Mosorinski, Pandzic (SRB)
3 August; 18:00	3× (yellow card) 7× (suspension) 1× (red card)	Report	3× (yellow card) 10× (suspension) 2× (red card)	Palacio de los Deportes, Santo Domingo; Attendance: 100; Referees: Mosorinski, Pandzic (SRB)

3 August; 20:00	Thailand	18 – 51	South Korea	Palacio de los Deportes, Santo Domingo; Attendance: 100; Referees: Gonzalez, Prieto (URU)
3 August; 20:00	Piman 4	(6–27)	Kim Mingyeong 13	Palacio de los Deportes, Santo Domingo; Attendance: 100; Referees: Gonzalez, Prieto (URU)
3 August; 20:00	3× (yellow card) 4× (suspension)	Report	3× (yellow card) 7× (suspension)	Palacio de los Deportes, Santo Domingo; Attendance: 100; Referees: Gonzalez, Prieto (URU)

4 August; 20:00	Brazil	24 – 34	Russia	Palacio de los Deportes, Santo Domingo; Referees: Kliko, Johansson (SWE)
4 August; 20:00	Silva 5	(12–14)	Milova 6	Palacio de los Deportes, Santo Domingo; Referees: Kliko, Johansson (SWE)
4 August; 20:00	3× (yellow card) 4× (suspension)	Report	3× (yellow card) 3× (suspension)	Palacio de los Deportes, Santo Domingo; Referees: Kliko, Johansson (SWE)

5 August; 18:00	South Korea	29 – 28	Brazil	Palacio de los Deportes, Santo Domingo; Attendance: 100; Referees: Mousavian, Taghavi (IRI)
5 August; 18:00	Noh Hyeona 12	(18–13)	Araujo 8	Palacio de los Deportes, Santo Domingo; Attendance: 100; Referees: Mousavian, Taghavi (IRI)
5 August; 18:00	2× (yellow card) 7× (suspension)	Report	3× (yellow card) 7× (suspension)	Palacio de los Deportes, Santo Domingo; Attendance: 100; Referees: Mousavian, Taghavi (IRI)

5 August; 20:00	Spain	59 – 21	Thailand	Palacio de los Deportes, Santo Domingo; Attendance: 100; Referees: Unlu, Simsek (TUR)
5 August; 20:00	Falcon, Lopez 10	(26–11)	Y. Changkorlo, Piman 6	Palacio de los Deportes, Santo Domingo; Attendance: 100; Referees: Unlu, Simsek (TUR)
5 August; 20:00	2× (yellow card) 3× (suspension)	Report	3× (yellow card) 2× (suspension)	Palacio de los Deportes, Santo Domingo; Attendance: 100; Referees: Unlu, Simsek (TUR)

6 August; 20:00	Thailand	20 – 57	Russia	Palacio de los Deportes, Santo Domingo; Attendance: 100; Referees: Abid, Chaouch (TUN)
6 August; 20:00	Y. Changkorlo, O. Wongnara 4	(8–25)	V. Garanina 7	Palacio de los Deportes, Santo Domingo; Attendance: 100; Referees: Abid, Chaouch (TUN)
6 August; 20:00	1× (yellow card) 1× (suspension)	Report	3× (yellow card) 3× (suspension)	Palacio de los Deportes, Santo Domingo; Attendance: 100; Referees: Abid, Chaouch (TUN)

7 August; 18:00	Russia	32 – 29	South Korea	Palacio de los Deportes, Santo Domingo; Attendance: 100; Referees: Arntsen, Gullaksen (NOR)
7 August; 18:00	V. Garanina, Divak 8	(19–14)	Noh Hyeona, Kim Jungeun 8	Palacio de los Deportes, Santo Domingo; Attendance: 100; Referees: Arntsen, Gullaksen (NOR)
7 August; 18:00	3× (yellow card) 7× (suspension)	Report	3× (yellow card) 2× (suspension)	Palacio de los Deportes, Santo Domingo; Attendance: 100; Referees: Arntsen, Gullaksen (NOR)

7 August; 20:00	Spain	29 – 25	Brazil	Palacio de los Deportes, Santo Domingo; Attendance: 100; Referees: Mosorinski, Pandzic (SRB)
7 August; 20:00	Segura 10	(15–10)	Silva 5	Palacio de los Deportes, Santo Domingo; Attendance: 100; Referees: Mosorinski, Pandzic (SRB)
7 August; 20:00	3× (yellow card) 1× (suspension)	Report	3× (yellow card) 8× (suspension)	Palacio de los Deportes, Santo Domingo; Attendance: 100; Referees: Mosorinski, Pandzic (SRB)

== Placement matches ==
=== 17th–20th ===
Semifinal 17th–20th
August 9 – Santo Domingo
Argentina
Bye
August 9 – Santo Domingo
DR Congo	32
Thailand	29

17th place
August 10 – Santo Domingo
Argentina	29
DR Congo	20
19th place
August 10 – Santo Domingo
Thailand
Bye

9 August; 12:00	DR Congo	32 – 29	Thailand	Palacio de los Deportes, Santo Domingo; Attendance: 100; Referees: Simsek, Unlu (TUR)
9 August; 12:00	Betu 10	(12–12)	O. Wongnara, K. Paochanouan 6	Palacio de los Deportes, Santo Domingo; Attendance: 100; Referees: Simsek, Unlu (TUR)
9 August; 12:00	3× (yellow card) 7× (suspension)	Report	3× (yellow card)	Palacio de los Deportes, Santo Domingo; Attendance: 100; Referees: Simsek, Unlu (TUR)

==== 17th/18th ====
10 August; 16:00	Argentina	29 – 20	DR Congo	Handball Pavilion, Santo Domingo; Attendance: 100; Referees: Golus Szubelak, Novak (USA)
10 August; 16:00	Iacoi 7	(14–10)	Betu 7	Handball Pavilion, Santo Domingo; Attendance: 100; Referees: Golus Szubelak, Novak (USA)
10 August; 16:00	3× (yellow card) 2× (suspension)	Report	3× (yellow card) 7× (suspension)	Handball Pavilion, Santo Domingo; Attendance: 100; Referees: Golus Szubelak, Novak (USA)

=== 13th–16th ===
Semifinal 13th–16th
August 9 – Santo Domingo
Germany	32
Japan	29
August 9 – Santo Domingo
Kazakhstan	31
Brazil	41

13th place
August 10 – Santo Domingo
Germany	29
Brazil	32
15th place
August 10 – Santo Domingo
Japan	29
Kazakhstan	25

9 August; 14:00	Germany	32 – 29	Japan	Palacio de los Deportes, Santo Domingo; Attendance: 100; Referees: Abid, Chaouch (TUN)
9 August; 14:00	E. Minevskaja 7	(17–12)	Ikki 9	Palacio de los Deportes, Santo Domingo; Attendance: 100; Referees: Abid, Chaouch (TUN)
9 August; 14:00	3× (yellow card) 2× (suspension)	Report	1× (yellow card) 1× (suspension)	Palacio de los Deportes, Santo Domingo; Attendance: 100; Referees: Abid, Chaouch (TUN)

9 August; 16:00	Kazakhstan	31 – 41	Brazil	Palacio de los Deportes, Santo Domingo; Attendance: 100; Referees: Arntsen, Gullaksen (NOR)
9 August; 16:00	L. Yevgeniya 10	(19–19)	Araujo 10	Palacio de los Deportes, Santo Domingo; Attendance: 100; Referees: Arntsen, Gullaksen (NOR)
9 August; 16:00	2× (yellow card) 3× (suspension)	Report	2× (yellow card)	Palacio de los Deportes, Santo Domingo; Attendance: 100; Referees: Arntsen, Gullaksen (NOR)

==== 15th/16th ====
10 August; 18:00	Japan	29 – 25	Kazakhstan	Palacio de los Deportes, Santo Domingo; Attendance: 100; Referees: Unlu, Simsek (TUR)
10 August; 18:00	Ikki 8	(14–14)	Z. Aida 8	Palacio de los Deportes, Santo Domingo; Attendance: 100; Referees: Unlu, Simsek (TUR)
10 August; 18:00	2× (yellow card) 5× (suspension)	Report	3× (yellow card) 6× (suspension) 1× (red card)	Palacio de los Deportes, Santo Domingo; Attendance: 100; Referees: Unlu, Simsek (TUR)

==== 13th/14th ====
10 August; 20:00	Germany	29 – 32	Brazil	Palacio de los Deportes, Santo Domingo; Attendance: 100; Referees: Wyss, Zowa (SUI)
10 August; 20:00	E. Minevskaja, Diehl 6	(14–15)	Rocha 6	Palacio de los Deportes, Santo Domingo; Attendance: 100; Referees: Wyss, Zowa (SUI)
10 August; 20:00	3× (yellow card) 1× (suspension)	Report	3× (yellow card) 2× (suspension)	Palacio de los Deportes, Santo Domingo; Attendance: 100; Referees: Wyss, Zowa (SUI)

=== 9th–12th ===
Semifinal 9th–12th
August 9 – Santo Domingo
Angola	28
Uruguay	26
August 9 – Santo Domingo
Hungary	28
South Korea	29

9th place
August 10 – Santo Domingo
Angola	23
South Korea	32
11th place
August 10 – Santo Domingo
Uruguay	34
Hungary	44

9 August; 18:00	Angola	28 – 26	Uruguay	Palacio de los Deportes, Santo Domingo; Attendance: 100; Referees: Golus Szubelak, Novak (USA)
9 August; 18:00	Luis 8	(10–12)	A. Colamonici 10	Palacio de los Deportes, Santo Domingo; Attendance: 100; Referees: Golus Szubelak, Novak (USA)
9 August; 18:00	3× (yellow card) 6× (suspension)	Report	3× (yellow card) 1× (suspension)	Palacio de los Deportes, Santo Domingo; Attendance: 100; Referees: Golus Szubelak, Novak (USA)

9 August; 20:00	Hungary	28 – 29	South Korea	Palacio de los Deportes, Santo Domingo; Attendance: 100; Referees: Gonzalez, Prieto (URU)
9 August; 20:00	Toth 8	(18–14)	Noh 6	Palacio de los Deportes, Santo Domingo; Attendance: 100; Referees: Gonzalez, Prieto (URU)
9 August; 20:00	3× (yellow card) 4× (suspension)	Report	2× (yellow card) 2× (suspension)	Palacio de los Deportes, Santo Domingo; Attendance: 100; Referees: Gonzalez, Prieto (URU)

==== 11th/12th ====
10 August; 14:00	Uruguay	34 – 44	Hungary	Palacio de los Deportes, Santo Domingo; Attendance: 100; Referees: Abid, Chaouch (TUN)
10 August; 14:00	A. Colamonici 7	(15–22)	Palko 10	Palacio de los Deportes, Santo Domingo; Attendance: 100; Referees: Abid, Chaouch (TUN)
10 August; 14:00	3× (yellow card) 3× (suspension)	Report	3× (yellow card) 5× (suspension)	Palacio de los Deportes, Santo Domingo; Attendance: 100; Referees: Abid, Chaouch (TUN)

==== 9th/10th ====
10 August; 16:00	Angola	23 – 32	South Korea	Palacio de los Deportes, Santo Domingo; Attendance: 100; Referees: Crnojevic, Kostecki (CRO)
10 August; 16:00	Eduardo 6	(8–17)	Kim Gyeongeun 10	Palacio de los Deportes, Santo Domingo; Attendance: 100; Referees: Crnojevic, Kostecki (CRO)
10 August; 16:00	2× (yellow card) 5× (suspension)	Report	2× (yellow card) 2× (suspension)	Palacio de los Deportes, Santo Domingo; Attendance: 100; Referees: Crnojevic, Kostecki (CRO)

== Final round ==
Quarterfinal
August 9 – Santo Domingo
Netherlands	28
Dominican Republic	24
August 9 – Santo Domingo
Sweden	24
Spain	22
August 9 – Santo Domingo
Norway	26
Denmark	23
August 9 – Santo Domingo
Russia	23
France	31

Semifinal
August 11 – Santo Domingo
Netherlands	21
Sweden	38
August 11 – Santo Domingo
Norway	22
France	18

Final
August 12 – Santo Domingo
Sweden	34
Norway	29
Third place
August 12 – Santo Domingo
Netherlands	27
France	26

Semifinal 5th–8th
August 10 – Santo Domingo
Dominican Republic	15
Spain	28
August 10 – Santo Domingo
Denmark	25
Russia	23

5th place
August 11 – Santo Domingo
Spain	27
Denmark	20
7th place
August 11 – Santo Domingo
Dominican Republic	22
Russia	25

=== Quarterfinals ===
9 August
13:00
Spain
22 – 24 (ET)
Sweden
Handball Pavilion, Santo Domingo
Attendance: 200
Referees: Pandzic, Mosorinski (SRB)
Falcon 6
(10–10)
three players 4
3× (yellow card) 2× (suspension) 1× (red card)
Report
3× (yellow card) 7× (suspension) 1× (red card)

FT: 19–19 ET: 3–5

9 August; 15:30	Norway	26 – 23	Denmark	Handball Pavilion, Santo Domingo; Attendance: 200; Referees: Kliko, Johansson (SWE)
9 August; 15:30	Henriksen, Bakkerud 5	(15–14)	Burgaard 8	Handball Pavilion, Santo Domingo; Attendance: 200; Referees: Kliko, Johansson (SWE)
9 August; 15:30	3× (yellow card) 4× (suspension)	Report	3× (yellow card)	Handball Pavilion, Santo Domingo; Attendance: 200; Referees: Kliko, Johansson (SWE)

9 August; 18:00	France	31 – 23	Russia	Handball Pavilion, Santo Domingo; Attendance: 200; Referees: Marin Lorente, Serradilla (ESP)
9 August; 18:00	Bruneau 7	(12–12)	Milova, V. Garanina 5	Handball Pavilion, Santo Domingo; Attendance: 200; Referees: Marin Lorente, Serradilla (ESP)
9 August; 18:00	3× (yellow card) 4× (suspension)	Report	3× (yellow card) 2× (suspension)	Handball Pavilion, Santo Domingo; Attendance: 200; Referees: Marin Lorente, Serradilla (ESP)

9 August; 20:30	Netherlands	28 – 24	Dominican Republic	Handball Pavilion, Santo Domingo; Attendance: 800; Referees: Mousavian, Taghavi (IRI)
9 August; 20:30	T. van der Pijl 8	(15–14)	Andino 8	Handball Pavilion, Santo Domingo; Attendance: 800; Referees: Mousavian, Taghavi (IRI)
9 August; 20:30	2× (yellow card) 1× (suspension)	Report	3× (yellow card) 1× (suspension)	Handball Pavilion, Santo Domingo; Attendance: 800; Referees: Mousavian, Taghavi (IRI)

=== 5th–8th ===
10 August; 18:00	Dominican Republic	15 – 28	Spain	Handball Pavilion, Santo Domingo; Attendance: 300; Referees: Gullaksen, Arntsen (NOR)
10 August; 18:00	Pimentel 7	(7–14)	Valle 6	Handball Pavilion, Santo Domingo; Attendance: 300; Referees: Gullaksen, Arntsen (NOR)
10 August; 18:00	3× (yellow card) 6× (suspension)	Report	2× (yellow card) 2× (suspension)	Handball Pavilion, Santo Domingo; Attendance: 300; Referees: Gullaksen, Arntsen (NOR)

10 August; 20:00	Denmark	25 – 23	Russia	Handball Pavilion, Santo Domingo; Attendance: 100; Referees: Mousavian, Taghavi (IRI)
10 August; 20:00	Burgaard 9	(9–12)	Milova 9	Handball Pavilion, Santo Domingo; Attendance: 100; Referees: Mousavian, Taghavi (IRI)
10 August; 20:00	3× (yellow card) 3× (suspension)	Report	3× (yellow card) 4× (suspension)	Handball Pavilion, Santo Domingo; Attendance: 100; Referees: Mousavian, Taghavi (IRI)

=== 7th/8th ===
11 August; 13:30	Dominican Republic	22 – 25	Russia	Handball Pavilion, Santo Domingo; Attendance: 100; Referees: Prieto, Gonzalez (URU)
11 August; 13:30	Lopez 10	(11–13)	V. Garanina 7	Handball Pavilion, Santo Domingo; Attendance: 100; Referees: Prieto, Gonzalez (URU)
11 August; 13:30	3× (yellow card) 2× (suspension)	Report	3× (yellow card) 5× (suspension) 1× (red card)	Handball Pavilion, Santo Domingo; Attendance: 100; Referees: Prieto, Gonzalez (URU)

=== 5th/6th ===
11 August; 15:30	Spain	27 – 20	Denmark	Handball Pavilion, Santo Domingo; Attendance: 400; Referees: Kliko, Johansson (SWE)
11 August; 15:30	González 6	(15–9)	Heindahl 6	Handball Pavilion, Santo Domingo; Attendance: 400; Referees: Kliko, Johansson (SWE)
11 August; 15:30	3× (yellow card) 2× (suspension)	Report	3× (yellow card) 4× (suspension)	Handball Pavilion, Santo Domingo; Attendance: 400; Referees: Kliko, Johansson (SWE)

=== Semifinals ===
11 August; 17:30	Netherlands	21 – 38	Sweden	Handball Pavilion, Santo Domingo; Attendance: 300; Referees: Marin Lorente, Serradilla (ESP)
11 August; 17:30	Malestein 8	(7–17)	three players 7	Handball Pavilion, Santo Domingo; Attendance: 300; Referees: Marin Lorente, Serradilla (ESP)
11 August; 17:30	3× (yellow card) 2× (suspension)	Report	3× (yellow card) 6× (suspension)	Handball Pavilion, Santo Domingo; Attendance: 300; Referees: Marin Lorente, Serradilla (ESP)

11 August; 20:00	Norway	22 – 18	France	Handball Pavilion, Santo Domingo; Attendance: 500; Referees: Pandzic, Mosorinski (SRB)
11 August; 20:00	Smith 6	(10–10)	Bruneau 4	Handball Pavilion, Santo Domingo; Attendance: 500; Referees: Pandzic, Mosorinski (SRB)
11 August; 20:00	3× (yellow card) 1× (suspension)	Report	3× (yellow card) 2× (suspension)	Handball Pavilion, Santo Domingo; Attendance: 500; Referees: Pandzic, Mosorinski (SRB)

=== Bronze medal match ===
12 August; 18:00	Netherlands	27 – 26	France	Handball Pavilion, Santo Domingo; Attendance: 400; Referees: Gullaksen, Arntsen (NOR)
12 August; 18:00	Polman 10	(10–12)	Bruneau 6	Handball Pavilion, Santo Domingo; Attendance: 400; Referees: Gullaksen, Arntsen (NOR)
12 August; 18:00	3× (yellow card) 2× (suspension)	Report	3× (yellow card) 3× (suspension)	Handball Pavilion, Santo Domingo; Attendance: 400; Referees: Gullaksen, Arntsen (NOR)

=== Gold medal match ===
12 August; 20:30	Sweden	34 – 29	Norway	Handball Pavilion, Santo Domingo; Attendance: 500; Referees: Mousavian, Taghavi (IRN)
12 August; 20:30	Larsson 11	(17-10)	Rasmussen 7	Handball Pavilion, Santo Domingo; Attendance: 500; Referees: Mousavian, Taghavi (IRN)
12 August; 20:30	3× (yellow card) 2× (suspension)	Report	3× (yellow card) 2× (suspension)	Handball Pavilion, Santo Domingo; Attendance: 500; Referees: Mousavian, Taghavi (IRN)

== Final standings ==
Rank	Team
Gold medal	Sweden
Silver medal	Norway
Bronze medal	Netherlands
4	France
5	Spain
6	Denmark
7	Russia
8	Dominican Republic
9	South Korea
10	Angola
11	Hungary
12	Uruguay
13	Brazil
14	Germany
15	Japan
16	Kazakhstan
17	Argentina
18	DR Congo
19	Thailand

== Awards ==
2010 World Youth Women's Handball Championship winner

Sweden
First title

Most Valuable Player
(Sweden) Carin Strömberg

=== All-star team ===
- Goalkeeper: Fanny Chatelet (FRA)
- Left wing: Sheila Segura (ESP)
- Left back: Lara Gonzalez Ortega (ESP)
- Pivot: Kathrine Heindahl (DEN)
- Centre back: Marie Henriksen (NOR)
- Right back: Louise Burgaard (DEN)
- Right wing: Linn Larsson (SWE)
