= Vukojević =

Vukojević (Cyrillic script: Вукојевић) is a South Slavic surname. Notable people with the surname include:

- Igor Vukojević (born 1975), Bosnian singer
- Lea Vukojević (born 1993), Croatian handball player
- Ognjen Vukojević (born 1983), Croatian football player
