= Mercedes Saiz =

Uruguayan handball player (born 1992)

Personal information
- Nationality: Uruguayan
- Born: 12 September 1992 (age 34)
- Height: 173 cm (68 in)

Sport
- Sport: Handball
- Position: Right back
National team
- Years: Team
- –: Uruguay

Mercedes Saiz (born 12 September 1992) is a team handball player from Uruguay. She plays on the Uruguay women's national handball team, and participated at the 2011 World Women's Handball Championship in Brazil.

In 2010, she competed in the Youth World Handball Championship in Dominican Republic.
