= Kim Jin-yi (handballer) =

South Korean handball player (born 1993)

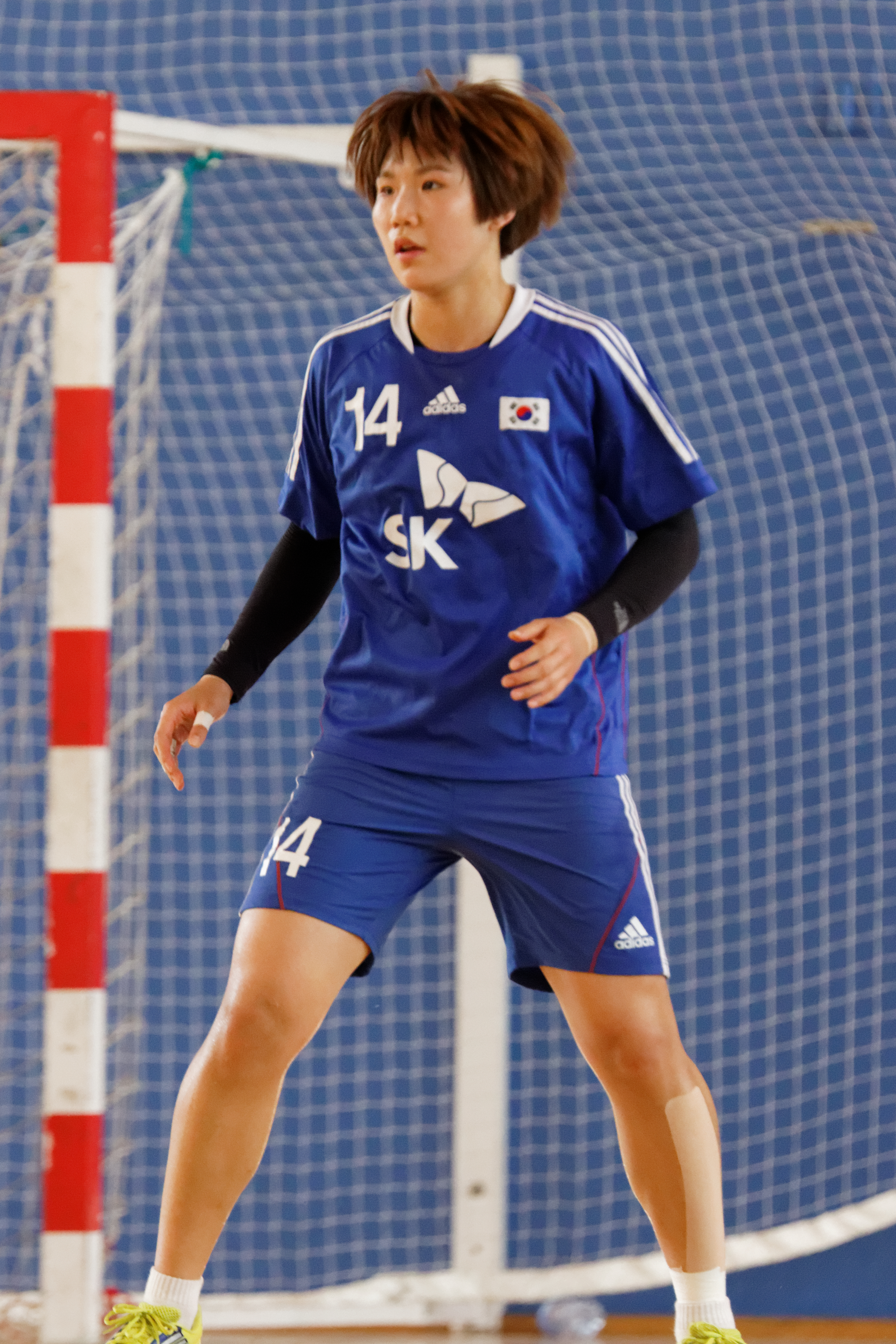

Personal information
- Nationality: South Korean
- Born: 20 June 1993 (age 33) Taebaek, South Korea
- Height: 1.79 m (5 ft 10 in)

Sport
- Sport: Handball
- Position: Left back
- Current club: Colorful Daegu
National team
Years	Team	Apps	(Gls)
–	South Korea	50	(115)
Medal record
Asian Championship
Gold medal – first place	2017 Korea
Gold medal – first place	2018 Japan
Gold medal – first place	2021 Jordan

- Kim Jin-yi
- Hangul: 김진이
- Hanja: 金鎭伊
- RR: Gim Jini
- MR: Kim Chini

Kim Jin-Yi (born 20 June 1993) is a South Korean handball player, who plays on the South Korean national team

She participated at the 2011 World Women's Handball Championship in Brazil, at the 2013 World Women's Handball Championship in Serbia, and at the 2015 World Women's Handball Championship in Denmark.

She has won the Asian Women's Handball Championship three times. In the first in 2017, she was the top scorer in the final against Japan with 7 goals.

In 2012, she competed at the 2012 Women's Junior World Handball Championship in the Czech Republic.
