= Marie Henriksen =

Norwegian handball player (born 1993)

Personal information
- Full name: Marie Henriksen
- Nationality: Norwegian
- Born: 31 August 1993 (age 33) Trondheim, Norway
- Height: 1.72 m (5 ft 8 in)

Sport
- Sport: Handball
- Position: Centre back
- Current club: Byåsen HE
- Number: 15

Senior clubs
- Years: Team
- 2009–2017: Byåsen HE
Medal record
Youth World Championship
Silver medal – second place	2010 Dominican Republic

Marie Henriksen (born 31 August 1993) is a former Norwegian handball player for the club Byåsen HE.

She also represented Norway in the 2011 Women's Junior European Handball Championship, placing 12th.

She was near a position on the Norwegian national team many times, but has been very unlucky with serious injuries in her young career. Spring 2016 she suffered her third serious injury in her right knee and in March 2017 she announced that she was forced to retire because of her injuries, at age 23.

She is the younger sister of international footballer Markus Henriksen and daughter of Trond Henriksen.

== Achievements ==
- World Youth Championship:
  - Silver Medalist: 2010

== Individual awards ==
- Best Rookie of Postenligaen: 2009/2010
- All-Star Centre Back of the Youth World Championship: 2010
- All-Star Centre Back of Grundigligaen: 2015/2016
