= Hege Bakken Wahlquist =

Norwegian handball player (born 1992)

Personal information
- Nationality: Norwegian
- Born: 7 August 1992 (age 34) Øvre Årdal, Norway
- Height: 1.74 m (5 ft 9 in)

Sport
- Sport: Handball
- Position: Left wing
- Current club: Silkeborg-Voel KFUM
- Number: 7

Senior clubs
- Years: Team
- 2008–2011: IL Jotun
- 2011–2013: Sola HK
- 2013–2016: Glassverket IF
- 2016–2017: Team Tvis Holstebro
- 2017–2021: Silkeborg/Voel KFUM
Medal record
Youth World Championship
Silver medal – second place	2010 Dominican Republic

Hege Bakken Wahlquist (born 7 August 1992) is a Norwegian handball player who currently plays for Silkeborg-Voel KFUM.

She represented Norway in the 2011 Women's Junior European Handball Championship, placing 12th.

She is also a part of Norway's national recruit team in handball.

== Achievements ==
- World Youth Championship:
  - Silver Medalist: 2010
- Norwegian League:
  - Bronze Medalist: 2015/2016
  - Silver Medalist: 2014/2015
- Norwegian Cup:
  - Silver Medalist: 2015

== Individual awards ==
- All-Star Left Wing of Grundigligaen 2015/2016
