= Lara González Ortega =

Spanish handball player (born 1992)

Lara González
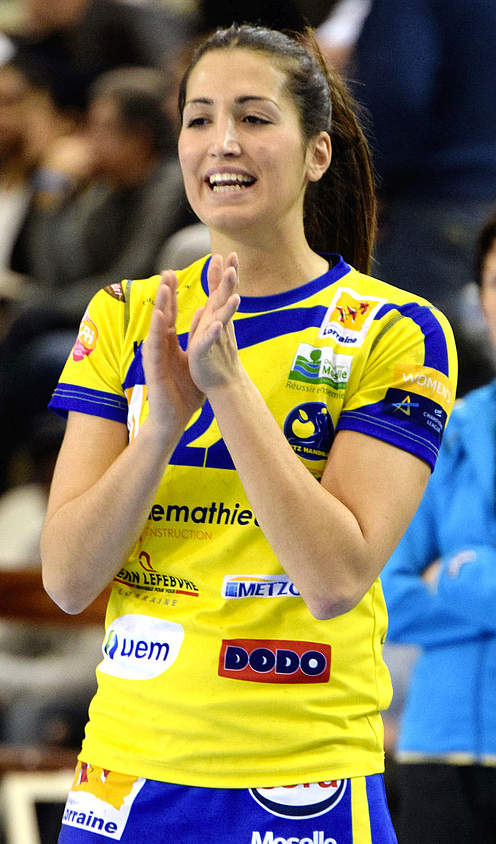
- González in 2014

Personal information
- Full name: Lara González Ortega
- Nationality: Spanish
- Born: 22 February 1992 (age 34) Santa Pola, Spain
- Height: 1.84 m (6 ft 0 in)

Sport
- Sport: Handball
- Position: Left back
- Current club: CS Rapid București
- Number: 2

Senior clubs
- Years: Team
- 2009–2012: CB Elche
- 2012–2015: Metz Handball
- 2015–2016: Siófok KC
- 2016–2018: Team Esbjerg
- 2018–2021: ESBF Besançon
- 2021–2023: Paris 92
- 2023–: CS Rapid București
National team
| Years | Team | Apps | (Gls) |
| 2013– | Spain | 144 | (113) |
Medal record
World Championship
| Silver medal – second place | 2019 Japan |
European Championship
| Silver medal – second place | 2014 Croatia/Hungary |
Mediterranean Games
| Gold medal – first place | 2018 Tarragona | Team |

Lara González Ortega (Note: In this Spanish name, the first or paternal surname is González and the second or maternal family name is Ortega.) (born 22 February 1992), known as Lara González is a Spanish handball player for Romanian club CS Rapid București and the Spanish national team.

In 2012, she was competing for Spain during the Women's Junior World Championship.

== Honours ==
- Champion of the French Championship of first division (D1F) in 2013 and 2014 (Metz)
