= Audrey Bruneau =

French handball player (born 1992)

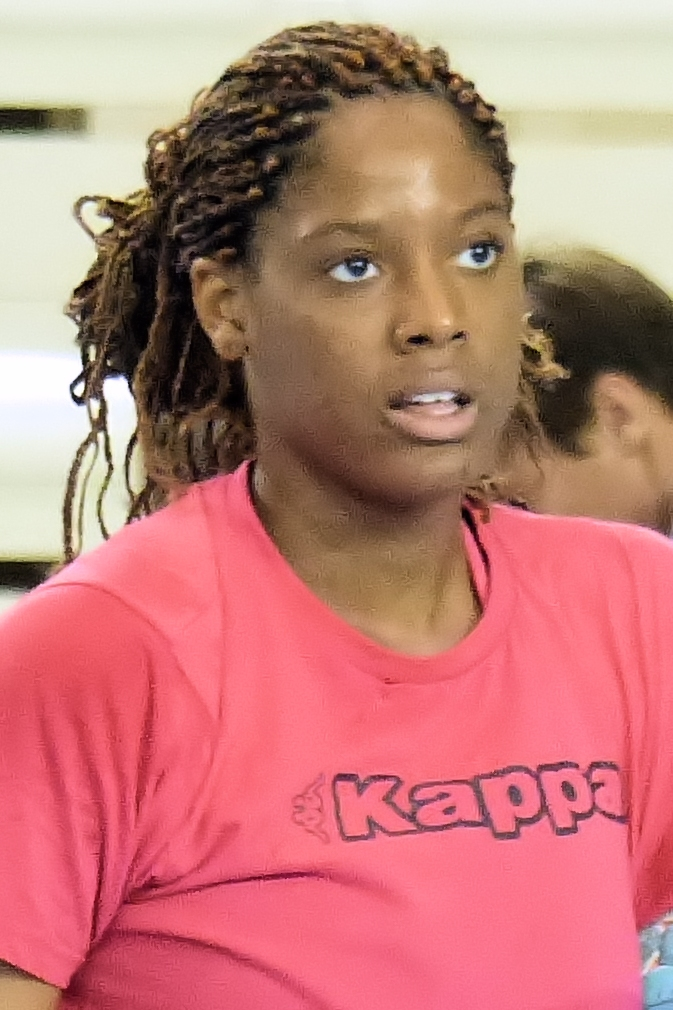

Personal information
- Nationality: French
- Born: 21 September 1992 (age 34) Clichy-la-Garenne, France
- Height: 1.89 m (6 ft 2 in)

Sport
- Sport: Handball
- Position: Left back
- Current club: Hypo Niederösterreich

Senior clubs
- Years: Team
- 2012-2016: Fleury Loiret HB
- 2016-: Hypo Niederösterreich
National team
Years	Team	Apps	(Gls)
2010-	France	40	(27)
Medal record
World Championship
Silver medal – second place	2011 Brazil	Team
- Updated on 4 December 2012

Audrey Bruneau (born 21 September 1992) is a French handball player. She plays on the French national team, and participated at the 2011 World Women's Handball Championship in Brazil.
