= Aleksandra Zych =

Polish handball player (born 1993)

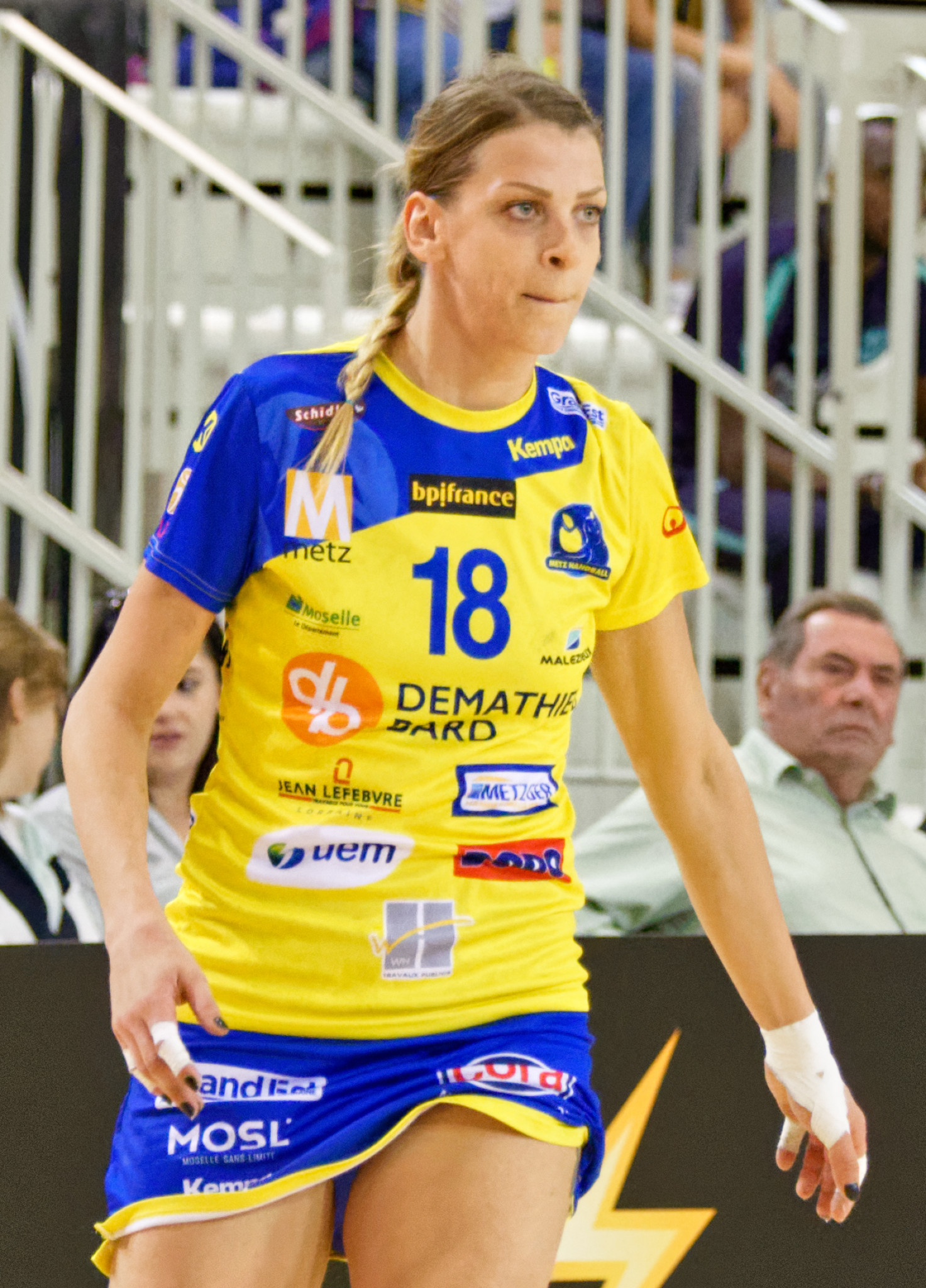

Personal information
- Nationality: Polish
- Born: 28 July 1993 (age 33) Wałbrzych, Poland
- Height: 1.86 m (6 ft 1 in)

Sport
- Sport: Handball
- Position: Right back
- Current club: EKS Start Elbląg
- Number: 81

Senior clubs
- Years: Team
- 2011–2012: GZKS Sośnica Gliwice
- 2012–2018: Vistal Gdynia
- 2018–2019: Metz Handball
- 2019–2020: Borussia Dortmund
- 2020–2021: Măgura Cisnădie
- 2021–2023: Minaur Baia Mare
- 2023–2024: Zagłębie Lubin
- 2024-: EKS Start Elbląg
National team
Years	Team	Apps	(Gls)
2013–	Poland	80	(102)
- Updated on 12 September 2024

Aleksandra Zych (born 28 July 1993) is a Polish professional handballer who plays as a right back for EKS Start Elbląg and the Polish national team.

== International honours ==
- Championnat de France :
  - Winner: 2019
- Polish Superliga:
  - Winner: 2017
- Coupe de France:
  - Winner: 2019
- Puchar Polski:
  - Winner: 2014, 2015, 2016
- Carpathian Trophy:
  - Winner: 2017
