= Julie Betu =

Congolese handball player

Personal information
- Full name: Julie Betu Mvita
- Nationality: Congolese
- Born: 25 August 1995 (age 31)
- Height: 1.63 m (5 ft 4 in)

Sport
- Sport: Handball
- Position: Left back

Senior clubs
- Years: Team
- ????–2014: Héritage Kinshasa
National team
- Years: Team
- 2012–2014: DR Congo

Julie Betu (25 August 1995 – disappeared on 2 July 2014) is a Congolese handball player, who played for Héritage Kinshasa and the DR Congo national team.

On the night of 2 to 3 July 2014, Betu and two other juniors of Congolese handball team, Mirinelle Kele and Laetitia Mumbala disappeared from their hotel in Đurđevac, Croatia, during the 2014 Women's Junior World Handball Championship. The women's luggage, wallets and identification were found in their rooms.

As of 2021, they have not yet been found.

== See also ==
- List of people who disappeared mysteriously (2000–present)
- Sri Lankan sporting disappearances
