= Patricia Batista da Silva =

Brazilian handball player (born 1992)

Personal information
- Born: 8 April 1992 (age 34) São Paulo, Brazil
- Height: 1.75 m (5 ft 9 in)

Sport
- Sport: Handball
- Position: Right back
- Current club: Thüringer HC
- Number: 92
National team
Years	Team	Apps	(Gls)
–	Brazil	39	(73)
Medal record
Pan American Championship
Gold medal – first place	2013 Dominican Republic
Gold medal – first place	2017 Argentina
South and Central American Championship
Gold medal – first place	2018 Brazil
South American Games
Gold medal – first place	2014 Chile
Gold medal – first place	2018 Cochabamba	Team
Youth Olympic Games
Bronze medal – third place	2010 Singapore	Team

Patricia Batista da Silva (born 8 April 1992) is a Brazilian handball player for Thüringer HC and the Brazilian national team.

She has played in the 2012 Women's Junior World Handball Championship.
