= Martina Weisenbilderová =

Czech handball player (born 1992)

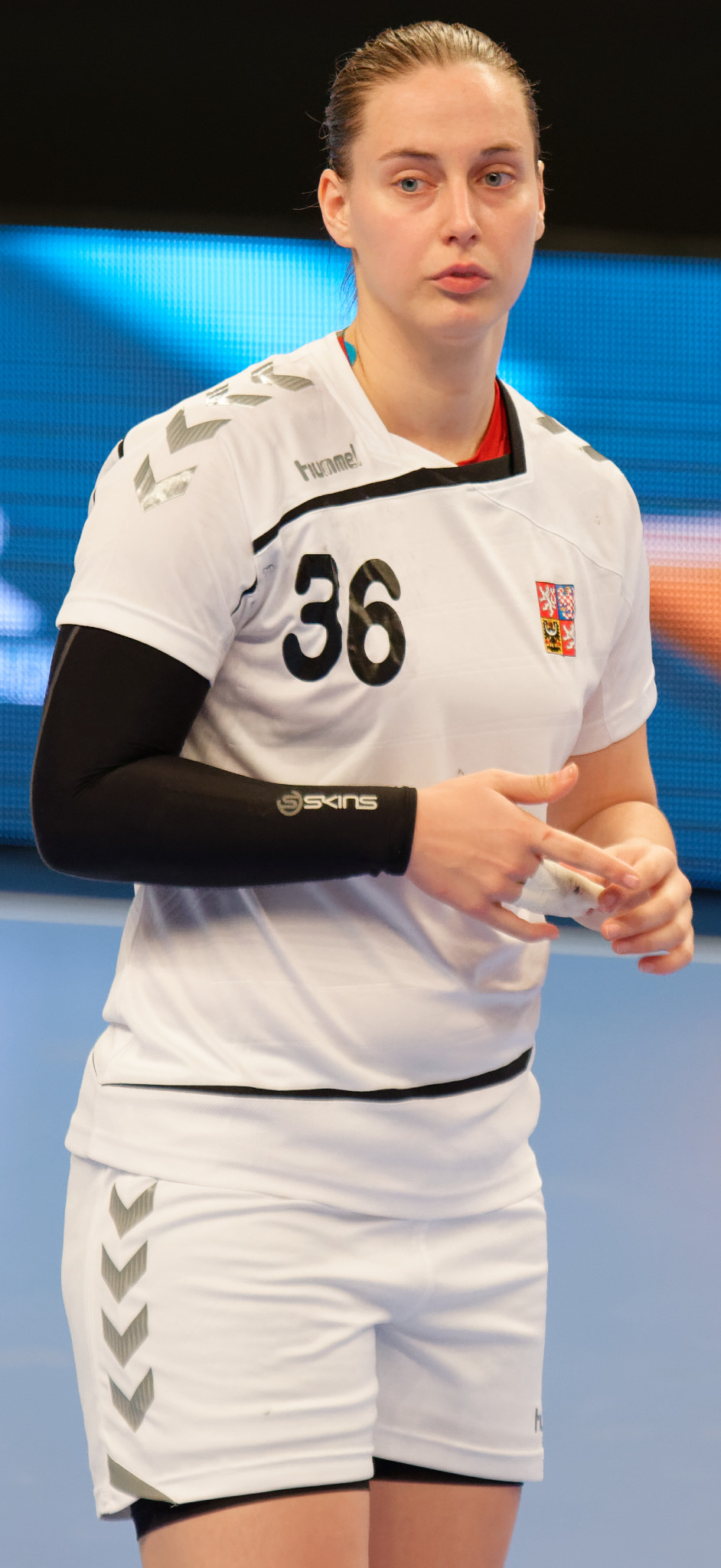

Personal information
- Nationality: Czech
- Born: 13 April 1992 (age 34) Liberec, Czechoslovakia
- Height: 1.81 m (5 ft 11 in)

Sport
- Sport: Handball
- Position: Centre back
- Current club: DHC Slavia Prague
- Number: 20

Senior clubs
- Years: Team
- 2011–2015: DHK Banik Most
- 2015–2021: Kristianstad Handboll
- 2022–: DHC Slavia Prague
National team
Years	Team	Apps	(Gls)
2015–	Czech Republic	10	(5)

Martina Weisenbilderová (born 13 April 1992) is a Czech handballer for DHC Slavia Prague and the Czech Republic national team.

== Achievements ==
- Czech First Division:
  - Winner: 2013, 2014
- EHF Challenge Cup:
  - Winner: 2013
