= Sanne Hoekstra =

Dutch handball player (born 1992)

Personal information
- Nationality: Dutch
- Born: 5 May 1992 (age 34) Amsterdam, Netherlands
- Height: 1.65 m (5 ft 5 in)

Sport
- Sport: Handball
- Position: Left wing
- Current club: Retired

Senior clubs
- Years: Team
- –: HV Blue Stars
- –2011: E&O Emmen
- 2009–2010: HandbalAcademie
- 2011–2014: SG Handball Rosengarten
- 2013–2014: Buxtehuder SV
- 2014–2020: HSG Bensheim/Auerbach
National team
Years	Team	Apps	(Gls)
2014-?	Netherlands	12	(13)
Medal record
World Championship
Silver medal – second place	2015 Denmark

Sanne Hoekstra (born 5 May 1992) is a Dutch former handball player. She was member of the Dutch national team. She competed at the 2015 World Women's Handball Championship in Denmark.
