= Šárka Frančíková =

Czech handball player

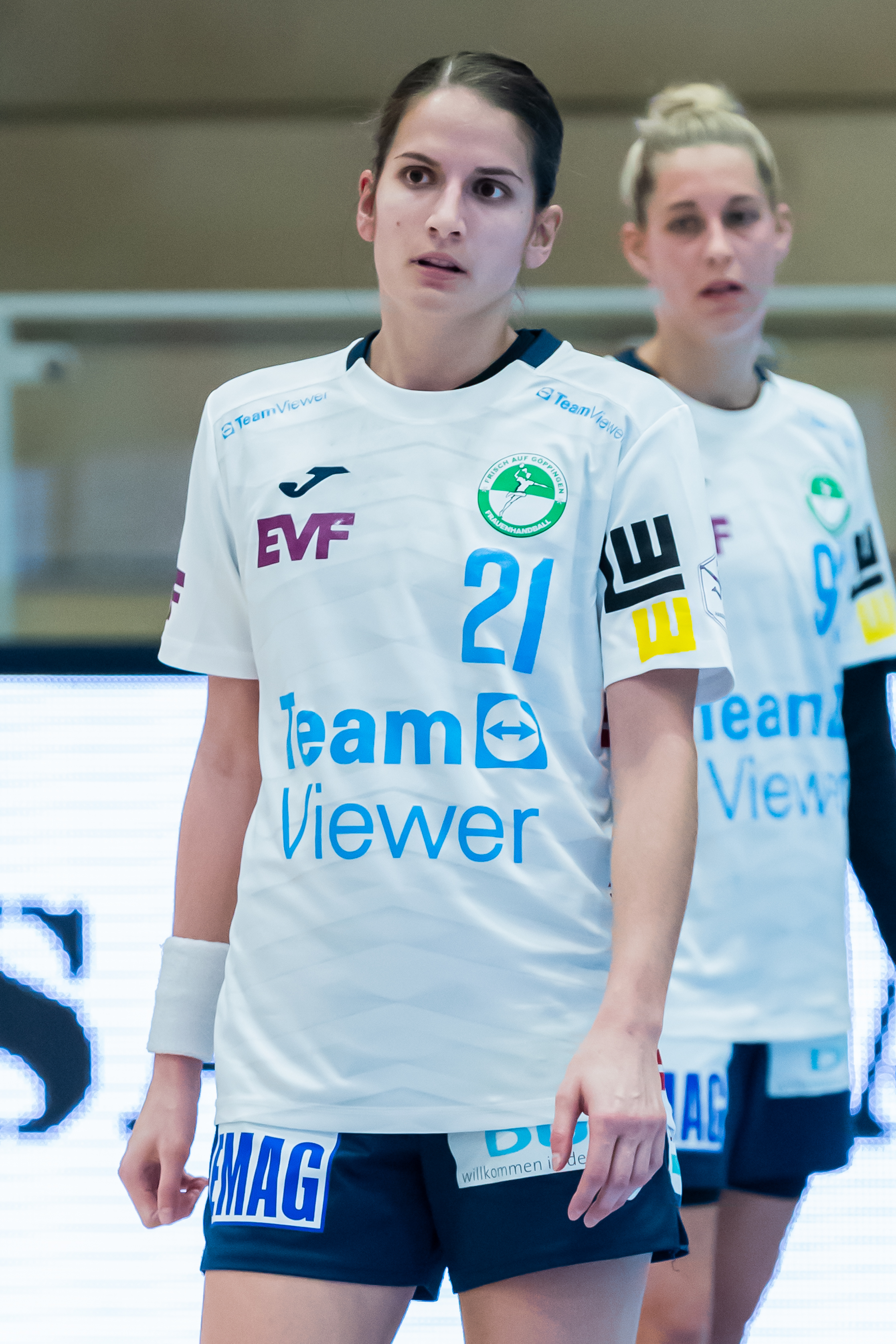

Personal information
- Nationality: Czechoslovak
- Born: 12 March 1992 (age 34) Zlín, Czechoslovakia
- Height: 1.76 m (5 ft 9 in)

Sport
- Sport: Handball
- Position: Centre back
- Current club: Frisch Auf Göppingen
- Number: 21

Senior clubs
- Years: Team
- 2014–2017: DHC Sokol Poruba
- 2017–2020: Pogoń Baltica Szczecin
- 2020–2022: Frisch Auf Göppingen
National team
Years	Team	Apps	(Gls)
2015–2022	Czech Republic	71	(61)

Šárka Frančíková (born Marčíková; 12 March 1992) is a Czech former handballer. She retired in 2022 while playing for Frisch Auf Göppingen and the Czech national team.

She participated at the 2018 European Women's Handball Championship.
