= Xoana Iacoi =

Argentine handball player

Personal information
- Full name: Xoana Soledad Iacoi
- Nationality: Argentine
- Born: 3 June 1992 (age 34)
- Height: 1.64 m (5 ft 5 in)

Sport
- Sport: Handball
- Position: Right back
- Current club: Cideco Handball
National team
Years	Team	Apps	(Gls)
–	Argentina	29	(43)
Medal record
Pan American Championship
Silver medal – second place	2017 Argentina
Bronze medal – third place	2015 Cuba
South American Games
Silver medal – second place	2018 Cochabamba	Team

Xoana Soledad Iacoi (born 3 June 1992) is an Argentine handball player for Cideco Handball and the Argentina women's national handball team.

She defended Argentina at the 2015 World Women's Handball Championship in Denmark.
