= Julie Aagaard =

Danish handball player (born 1992)

Julie Aagaard Poulsen
Personal information
- Nationality: Danish
- Born: 30 January 1992 (age 34) Brønderslev, Denmark
- Height: 1.78 m (5 ft 10 in)

Sport
- Sport: Handball
- Position: Right back
- Current club: EH Aalborg
- Number: 2

Senior clubs
- Years: Team
- 2009–2011: Aalborg DH
- 2011–2012: Viborg HK
- 2012–2013: SK Aarhus
- 2013–2014: Ringkøbing Håndbold
- 2014–2016: Team Aabybro
- 2016–2017: Silkeborg-Voel KFUM
- 2017–2020: EH Aalborg
National team
| Years | Team | Apps | (Gls) |
| 2012 | Denmark | 2 | (0) |
Medal record
Women's handball
Representing Denmark
European Junior Championship
| Gold medal – first place | 2011 Netherlands |
- Updated on 17 January 2024

Julie Aagaard Poulsen (born 30 January 1992) is a Danish former handball player. She was a member of the Danish junior national team that won the 2011 Women's U-19 European Handball Championship in August 2011 in the Netherlands, in the final match against the home team as the second most productive player of the winning team.

During her career she played two national team matches, both in 2012.

== Club career ==
She started playing top-level professional handball at the age of only 15 for Aalborg DH, where she played in the Champions League. When she switched to another giant in Danish handball, she began to grow tired of the sport, prompting her to move to SK Aarhus after only a year at Viborg. She planned to return to her childhood club Aalborg DH, but the club went bankrupt just before the start of the season. She instead signed for Ringkøbing Håndbold while also beginning the education as a physiotherapist, but after only 4 months she decided to take a break from handball due to burnout.

When she finished her education in 2017 she returned to top level handball at Silkeborg-Voel KFUM.

She returned to Aalborg in 2017, and in the last year of her career in 2020 she was part of the EH Aalborg team which went undefeated in the Danish 1st division.
