= Emilia Galińska =

Polish handball player (born 1992)

Personal information
- Full name: Emilia Galińska
- Nationality: Polish
- Born: 26 December 1992 (age 33) Łuków, Poland
- Height: 1.75 m (5 ft 9 in)

Sport
- Sport: Handball
- Position: Centre back
- Current club: CS Minaur Baia Mare
- Number: 6

Senior clubs
- Years: Team
- 2011-2013: KPR Jelenia Góra
- 2013-2016: GTPR Gdynia
- 2016-2017: Neckarsulmer SU
- 2017-2018: Borussia Dortmund Handball
- 2018-2019: SV Union Halle-Neustadt
- 2019-2023: MKS Zagłębie Lubin
- 2023-2024: CS Măgura Cisnădie
- 2024-: CS Minaur Baia Mare
National team
Years	Team	Apps	(Gls)
2016-	Poland	44	(43)
- Updated on 3 November 2024

Emilia Galińska (born 26 December 1992) is a Polish handball player for MKS Zagłębie Lubin and the Polish national team.

She participated at the 2016 European Women's Handball Championship.
