= Kseniya Milova =

Russian handball player

Personal information
- Nationality: Russian
- Born: 6 January 1992 (age 34)
- Height: 1.83 m (6 ft 0 in)

Sport
- Sport: Handball
- Position: Left back
- Current club: Dinamo Volgograd
National team
| Years | Team | Apps | (Gls) |
| – | Russia | 0 | (0) |
- Updated on 4 December 2012

Kseniya Milova (born 6 January 1992) is a Russian handball player for Dinamo Volgograd and the Russian national team.
