= Lea Vukojević =

Croatian handball player (born 1993)

Personal information
- Full name: Lea Vukojević
- Nationality: Croatian
- Born: 6 April 1993 (age 33) Koprivnica, Croatia
- Height: 1.75 m (5 ft 9 in)

Sport
- Sport: Handball
- Position: Right wing
- Current club: ŽRK Zrinski Čakovec
National team
- Years: Team
- –: Croatia

Lea Vukojević (born 6 April 1993) is a Croatian handball player who plays for ŽRK Zrinski Čakovec and the Croatia national team.
