= Natalia Vico =

Argentine handball player

Personal information
- Nationality: Argentinian
- Born: 10 November 1992 (age 33)
- Height: 1.75 m (5 ft 9 in)

Sport
- Sport: Handball
- Position: Central back
- Current club: Godoy Cruz MDZ
National team
Years	Team	Apps	(Gls)
–	Argentina	10	(6)
Medal record
Pan American Championship
Bronze medal – third place	2015 Cuba	Team

Natalia Vico (born 10 November 1992) is an Argentinian team handball player. She plays for the Godoy Cruz MDZ (Tomba) and on the Argentine national team. She represented Argentina at the 2013 World Women's Handball Championship in Serbia.
