= Rocio Ocanto =

Argentine handball player

Personal information
- Nationality: Argentinian
- Born: 6 September 1992 (age 34)
- Height: 1.71 m (5 ft 7 in)

Sport
- Sport: Handball
- Position: Right wing

Senior clubs
- Years: Team
- –: NS Lujan
- –: Ferro Carril Oeste
National team
Years	Team	Apps	(Gls)
2013-	Argentina	31	(25)
2009-	Argentina Beach		
- Updated on 23 February 2023

Rocio Ocanto (born 6 September 1992) is an Argentinian team handball and beach handball player.

== Overview ==
She has played for the club Lujan and Ferro Carril Oeste, and on the Argentine national team. She represented Argentina at the 2013 World Women's Handball Championship in Serbia, where Argentina finished 19th.
