= 2022 European Women's Handball Championship qualification =

This article describes the qualification for the 2022 European Women's Handball Championship and inaugural Women's EHF Euro Cup.

== Qualification system ==
32 teams registered for participation and competed for twelve places at the final tournament in two distinct qualification phases. The group winners of phase 1 advanced to phase 2. The 24 teams were then divided into six groups of four teams with the top two teams of each group qualifying for the final tournament.

== Qualification phase 1 ==
The draw took place on 17 March 2021.

All times are UTC+2.

=== Seeding ===
The eleven teams were seeded in four pots.

Pot 1	Pot 2	Pot 3	Pot 4
Faroe Islands; Portugal; Greece	Italy; Kosovo; Israel	Finland; Luxembourg; Bosnia and Herzegovina	Cyprus; Latvia

=== Group 1 ===
Pos	Team	Pld	W	D	L	GF	GA	GD	Pts	Qualification
1	Portugal	3	3	0	0	100	48	+52	6	Qualification Phase 2
2	Kosovo (H)	3	2	0	1	80	78	+2	4	
3	Cyprus	3	1	0	2	59	81	−22	2	
4	Luxembourg	3	0	0	3	60	92	−32	0	

Source: EHF
Rules for classification: 1) points; 2) head-to-head points; 3) head-to-head goal difference; 4) head-to-head number of goals scored; 5) goal difference.
(H) Hosts

3 June 2021; 17:00	Portugal	38–14	Luxembourg	Palace of Youth and Sports, Pristina; Attendance: 0 (Note: The match was played behind closed doors due to the COVID-19 pandemic.); Referees: Hatipoğlu, Şimşek (TUR)
3 June 2021; 17:00	Da Silva, Monteiro 5	(18–10)	Welter 4	Palace of Youth and Sports, Pristina; Attendance: 0 Referees: Hatipoğlu, Şimşek (TUR)
3 June 2021; 17:00	1× (yellow card) 7× (suspension)	Report	3× (yellow card) 4× (suspension)	Palace of Youth and Sports, Pristina; Attendance: 0 Referees: Hatipoğlu, Şimşek (TUR)

3 June 2021; 19:30	Kosovo	30–21	Cyprus	Palace of Youth and Sports, Pristina; Attendance: 0 Referees: Mikelić, Parađina (CRO)
3 June 2021; 19:30	Hajdari, Zogaj 7	(14–9)	Papa 11	Palace of Youth and Sports, Pristina; Attendance: 0 Referees: Mikelić, Parađina (CRO)
3 June 2021; 19:30	2× (yellow card) 5× (suspension)	Report	3× (yellow card) 2× (suspension)	Palace of Youth and Sports, Pristina; Attendance: 0 Referees: Mikelić, Parađina (CRO)

4 June 2021; 17:00	Cyprus	17–32	Portugal	Palace of Youth and Sports, Pristina; Attendance: 0 Referees: Mikelić, Parađina (CRO)
4 June 2021; 17:00	Papa 5	(8–19)	Monteiro 8	Palace of Youth and Sports, Pristina; Attendance: 0 Referees: Mikelić, Parađina (CRO)
4 June 2021; 17:00	3× (yellow card) 5× (suspension) 1× (red card)	Report	1× (yellow card) 3× (suspension)	Palace of Youth and Sports, Pristina; Attendance: 0 Referees: Mikelić, Parađina (CRO)

4 June 2021; 19:30	Luxembourg	27–33	Kosovo	Palace of Youth and Sports, Pristina; Attendance: 0 Referees: Hatipoğlu, Şimşek (TUR)
4 June 2021; 19:30	Welter 7	(9–16)	Marku 10	Palace of Youth and Sports, Pristina; Attendance: 0 Referees: Hatipoğlu, Şimşek (TUR)
4 June 2021; 19:30	2× (yellow card) 6× (suspension)	Report	3× (yellow card) 4× (suspension)	Palace of Youth and Sports, Pristina; Attendance: 0 Referees: Hatipoğlu, Şimşek (TUR)

5 June 2021; 17:00	Luxembourg	19–21	Cyprus	Palace of Youth and Sports, Pristina; Attendance: 0 Referees: Mikelić, Parađina (CRO)
5 June 2021; 17:00	Dautaj 5	(9–9)	Papa 7	Palace of Youth and Sports, Pristina; Attendance: 0 Referees: Mikelić, Parađina (CRO)
5 June 2021; 17:00	2× (yellow card) 3× (suspension)	Report	2× (yellow card) 1× (suspension)	Palace of Youth and Sports, Pristina; Attendance: 0 Referees: Mikelić, Parađina (CRO)

5 June 2021; 19:30	Portugal	30–17	Kosovo	Palace of Youth and Sports, Pristina; Attendance: 0 Referees: Hatipoğlu, Şimşek (TUR)
5 June 2021; 19:30	Sousa 5	(12–7)	Gjikokaj 5	Palace of Youth and Sports, Pristina; Attendance: 0 Referees: Hatipoğlu, Şimşek (TUR)
5 June 2021; 19:30	3× (yellow card) 4× (suspension)	Report	1× (yellow card) 3× (suspension)	Palace of Youth and Sports, Pristina; Attendance: 0 Referees: Hatipoğlu, Şimşek (TUR)

=== Group 2 ===
Pos	Team	Pld	W	D	L	GF	GA	GD	Pts	Qualification
1	Greece (H)	3	3	0	0	96	57	+39	6	Qualification Phase 2
2	Bosnia and Herzegovina	3	2	0	1	74	70	+4	4	
3	Italy	3	1	0	2	54	58	−4	2	
4	Latvia	3	0	0	3	36	75	−39	0	

Source: EHF
Rules for classification: 1) points; 2) head-to-head points; 3) head-to-head goal difference; 4) head-to-head number of goals scored; 5) goal difference.
(H) Hosts

4 June 2021; 17:00	Greece	29–18	Bosnia and Herzegovina	Filippio Sports Hall, Veria; Attendance: 0 Referees: Yovchev, Yovchev (BUL)
4 June 2021; 17:00	Chatziparasidou, Gkatziou 6	(15–10)	Isić 5	Filippio Sports Hall, Veria; Attendance: 0 Referees: Yovchev, Yovchev (BUL)
4 June 2021; 17:00	2× (yellow card) 2× (suspension)	Report	2× (yellow card) 6× (suspension)	Filippio Sports Hall, Veria; Attendance: 0 Referees: Yovchev, Yovchev (BUL)

5 June 2021; 15:00	Bosnia and Herzegovina	25–22	Italy	Filippio Sports Hall, Veria; Attendance: 0 Referees: Vitaku, Vitaku (KOS)
5 June 2021; 15:00	Gudelj, Kolašinac 5	(15–12)	Manojlovic 8	Filippio Sports Hall, Veria; Attendance: 0 Referees: Vitaku, Vitaku (KOS)
5 June 2021; 15:00	3× (yellow card) 5× (suspension)	Report	2× (yellow card) 1× (suspension)	Filippio Sports Hall, Veria; Attendance: 0 Referees: Vitaku, Vitaku (KOS)

5 June 2021; 17:00	Latvia	17–34	Greece	Filippio Sports Hall, Veria; Attendance: 0 Referees: Yovchev, Yovchev (BUL)
5 June 2021; 17:00	Cibuļska 4	(8–17)	Tsàkalou, Zeneli 5	Filippio Sports Hall, Veria; Attendance: 0 Referees: Yovchev, Yovchev (BUL)
5 June 2021; 17:00	1× (yellow card) 2× (suspension)	Report	2× (yellow card) 3× (suspension)	Filippio Sports Hall, Veria; Attendance: 0 Referees: Yovchev, Yovchev (BUL)

6 June 2021; 12:00	Bosnia and Herzegovina	31–19	Latvia	Filippio Sports Hall, Veria; Attendance: 0 Referees: Vitaku, Vitaku (KOS)
6 June 2021; 12:00	Čutura 6	(16–7)	Cibuļska 7	Filippio Sports Hall, Veria; Attendance: 0 Referees: Vitaku, Vitaku (KOS)
6 June 2021; 12:00	3× (yellow card) 3× (suspension)	Report	2× (yellow card) 2× (suspension)	Filippio Sports Hall, Veria; Attendance: 0 Referees: Vitaku, Vitaku (KOS)

6 June 2021; 14:00	Greece	33–22	Italy	Filippio Sports Hall, Veria; Attendance: 0 Referees: Yovchev, Yovchev (BUL)
6 June 2021; 14:00	Gkatziou 6	(15–9)	Rortondo 5	Filippio Sports Hall, Veria; Attendance: 0 Referees: Yovchev, Yovchev (BUL)
6 June 2021; 14:00	1× (yellow card) 4× (suspension)	Report	1× (yellow card) 3× (suspension)	Filippio Sports Hall, Veria; Attendance: 0 Referees: Yovchev, Yovchev (BUL)

Italy	10–0 (Note: The match could not be played after Latvia missed their flight after travel issues. The game was assessed by the EHF.)	Latvia

=== Group 3 ===
Pos	Team	Pld	W	D	L	GF	GA	GD	Pts	Qualification
1	Faroe Islands (H)	2	2	0	0	50	44	+6	4	Qualification Phase 2
2	Finland	2	1	0	1	47	45	+2	2	
3	Israel	2	0	0	2	49	57	−8	0	

Updated to match(es) played on 5 June 2021. Source: EHF
Rules for classification: 1) points; 2) head-to-head points; 3) head-to-head goal difference; 4) head-to-head number of goals scored; 5) goal difference.
(H) Hosts

4 June 2021; 19:30	Finland	19–21	Faroe Islands	Høllin á Hálsi, Tórshavn; Attendance: 50; Referees: Christiansen, Hansen (DEN)
4 June 2021; 19:30	Aarnio 7	(10–9)	Geirsdóttir, Mortensen 4	Høllin á Hálsi, Tórshavn; Attendance: 50; Referees: Christiansen, Hansen (DEN)
4 June 2021; 19:30	2× (yellow card) 5× (suspension)	Report	4× (suspension)	Høllin á Hálsi, Tórshavn; Attendance: 50; Referees: Christiansen, Hansen (DEN)

5 June 2021; 19:00	Israel	24–28	Finland	Høllin á Hálsi, Tórshavn; Attendance: 30; Referees: Christiansen, Hansen (DEN)
5 June 2021; 19:00	Vakrat 9	(10–14)	Fredriksson, Hilli 7	Høllin á Hálsi, Tórshavn; Attendance: 30; Referees: Christiansen, Hansen (DEN)
5 June 2021; 19:00	2× (yellow card) 6× (suspension)	Report	5× (suspension)	Høllin á Hálsi, Tórshavn; Attendance: 30; Referees: Christiansen, Hansen (DEN)

6 June 2021; 19:00	Faroe Islands	29–25	Israel	Høllin á Hálsi, Tórshavn; Attendance: 70; Referees: Christiansen, Hansen (DEN)
6 June 2021; 19:00	Krossteig 7	(15–11)	Vakrat 11	Høllin á Hálsi, Tórshavn; Attendance: 70; Referees: Christiansen, Hansen (DEN)
6 June 2021; 19:00	5× (suspension)	Report	2× (yellow card) 4× (suspension)	Høllin á Hálsi, Tórshavn; Attendance: 70; Referees: Christiansen, Hansen (DEN)

== Qualification phase 2 ==
The draw took place on 25 March 2021.

=== Seeding ===
The 24 teams were seeded in four pots.

Pot 1	Pot 2	Pot 3	Pot 4
Netherlands; Russia; France; Denmark; Spain; Sweden	Germany; Romania; Serbia; Hungary; Croatia; Poland	Czech Republic; Austria; Belarus; Switzerland; Slovakia; Iceland	Turkey; Lithuania; Ukraine; Portugal; Greece; Faroe Islands

Matchdays 1,2,5 and 6 are UTC+2, matchdays 3 and 4 are UTC+1.

=== Group 1 ===
Pos	Team	Pld	W	D	L	GF	GA	GD	Pts	Qualification
1	Poland	6	6	0	0	158	97	+61	12	Final tournament
2	Switzerland	6	3	0	3	150	136	+14	6	Final tournament
3	Russia (Note: Russia was disqualified. (Note: Russia was excluded after the Russian invasion of Ukraine.))	6	2	0	4	61	83	−22	4	Disqualified
4	Lithuania	6	1	0	5	128	181	−53	2	

Source: EHF
Rules for classification: 1) points; 2) head-to-head points; 3) head-to-head goal difference; 4) head-to-head number of goals scored; 5) goal difference.
Notes:

6 October 2021; 18:00	Poland	36–22	Lithuania	Stegu Arena, Opole; Attendance: 2,000; Referees: Cipov, Klus (SVK)
6 October 2021; 18:00	Matuszczyk, Nocuń 5	(22–12)	Strope 7	Stegu Arena, Opole; Attendance: 2,000; Referees: Cipov, Klus (SVK)
6 October 2021; 18:00	2× (yellow card) 4× (suspension)	Report	1× (yellow card) 3× (suspension) 1× (red card)	Stegu Arena, Opole; Attendance: 2,000; Referees: Cipov, Klus (SVK)

6 October 2021; 18:30	Russia	26–22	Switzerland	Dynamo Sports Palace, Moscow; Attendance: 750; Referees: Nabokau, Kulik (BLR)
6 October 2021; 18:30	Kirdiasheva 6	(13–7)	Hodel, Kündig 4	Dynamo Sports Palace, Moscow; Attendance: 750; Referees: Nabokau, Kulik (BLR)
6 October 2021; 18:30	1× (yellow card) 3× (suspension)	Report	1× (yellow card) 5× (suspension)	Dynamo Sports Palace, Moscow; Attendance: 750; Referees: Nabokau, Kulik (BLR)

9 October 2021; 15:00	Lithuania	21–35	Russia	Švyturys Arena, Klaipėda; Attendance: 300; Referees: Kinnari, Skogberg (FIN)
9 October 2021; 15:00	Strope 5	(10–17)	Mikhaylichenko 6	Švyturys Arena, Klaipėda; Attendance: 300; Referees: Kinnari, Skogberg (FIN)
9 October 2021; 15:00	2× (yellow card) 2× (suspension)	Report	1× (yellow card) 3× (suspension)	Švyturys Arena, Klaipėda; Attendance: 300; Referees: Kinnari, Skogberg (FIN)

10 October 2021; 15:00	Switzerland	22–31	Poland	Axa-Arena, Winterthur; Attendance: 820; Referees: Lončar, Lončar (CRO)
10 October 2021; 15:00	Hodel 6	(13–15)	Kobylińska 6	Axa-Arena, Winterthur; Attendance: 820; Referees: Lončar, Lončar (CRO)
10 October 2021; 15:00	1× (yellow card) 4× (suspension)	Report	1× (yellow card) 5× (suspension)	Axa-Arena, Winterthur; Attendance: 820; Referees: Lončar, Lončar (CRO)

3 March 2022; 18:00	Lithuania	30–36	Switzerland	Švyturys Arena, Klaipėda; Attendance: 150; Referees: Yovchev, Yonchev (BUL)
3 March 2022; 18:00	Repeckaite 8	(19–18)	Hodel 12	Švyturys Arena, Klaipėda; Attendance: 150; Referees: Yovchev, Yonchev (BUL)
3 March 2022; 18:00	1× (yellow card) 3× (suspension)	Report	2× (yellow card) 4× (suspension)	Švyturys Arena, Klaipėda; Attendance: 150; Referees: Yovchev, Yonchev (BUL)

6 March 2022; 16:00	Switzerland	34–18	Lithuania	Mobiliar Arena, Gümligen; Attendance: 1,250; Referees: Geraets, Geraets (NED)
6 March 2022; 16:00	Kündig 12	(12–10)	Kolosovė 9	Mobiliar Arena, Gümligen; Attendance: 1,250; Referees: Geraets, Geraets (NED)
6 March 2022; 16:00	1× (yellow card) 2× (suspension)	Report	4× (suspension)	Mobiliar Arena, Gümligen; Attendance: 1,250; Referees: Geraets, Geraets (NED)

20 April 2022; 18:00	Lithuania	27–40	Poland	Alytus Arena, Alytus; Attendance: 300; Referees: Kull, Tint (EST)
20 April 2022; 18:00	Strope 10	(15–19)	Łabuda 9	Alytus Arena, Alytus; Attendance: 300; Referees: Kull, Tint (EST)
20 April 2022; 18:00	3× (suspension)	Report	7× (suspension)	Alytus Arena, Alytus; Attendance: 300; Referees: Kull, Tint (EST)

24 April 2022; 16:15	Poland	31–26	Switzerland	Hala widowiskowo-sportowa, Lubin; Attendance: 3,000; Referees: Praštalo, Balvan (BIH)
24 April 2022; 16:15	Zawistowska 9	(19–11)	Kähr, Schmid 5	Hala widowiskowo-sportowa, Lubin; Attendance: 3,000; Referees: Praštalo, Balvan (BIH)
24 April 2022; 16:15	1× (yellow card) 3× (suspension)	Report	1× (yellow card) 3× (suspension)	Hala widowiskowo-sportowa, Lubin; Attendance: 3,000; Referees: Praštalo, Balvan (BIH)

Cancelled (Note: The matches, originally scheduled for March 2022, were postponed due to the 2022 Russian invasion of Ukraine.)	Poland	10–0	Russia

Cancelled	Russia	0–10	Poland

Cancelled	Switzerland	10–0	Russia

Cancelled	Russia	0–10	Lithuania

=== Group 2 ===
Pos	Team	Pld	W	D	L	GF	GA	GD	Pts	Qualification
1	Denmark	6	6	0	0	197	133	+64	12	Final tournament
2	Romania	6	3	1	2	183	169	+14	7	Final tournament
3	Austria	6	2	1	3	161	182	−21	5	
4	Faroe Islands	6	0	0	6	120	177	−57	0	

Source: EHF
Rules for classification: 1) points; 2) head-to-head points; 3) head-to-head goal difference; 4) head-to-head number of goals scored; 5) goal difference.

6 October 2021; 17:30	Romania	26–19	Faroe Islands	Sala sporturilor Mioveni, Mioveni; Attendance: 1,000; Referees: Jakovljević, Sando (SRB)
6 October 2021; 17:30	Pintea 9	(15–14)	three players 4	Sala sporturilor Mioveni, Mioveni; Attendance: 1,000; Referees: Jakovljević, Sando (SRB)
6 October 2021; 17:30	2× (yellow card) 4× (suspension)	Report	1× (yellow card) 3× (suspension)	Sala sporturilor Mioveni, Mioveni; Attendance: 1,000; Referees: Jakovljević, Sando (SRB)

7 October 2021; 20:00	Denmark	27–22	Austria	Forum Horsens, Horsens; Attendance: 2,407; Referees: Budzák, Záhradník (SVK)
7 October 2021; 20:00	Højlund 5	(12–11)	Frey, Huber 4	Forum Horsens, Horsens; Attendance: 2,407; Referees: Budzák, Záhradník (SVK)
7 October 2021; 20:00	1× (yellow card)	Report	3× (suspension)	Forum Horsens, Horsens; Attendance: 2,407; Referees: Budzák, Záhradník (SVK)

10 October 2021; 17:15	Faroe Islands	19–39	Denmark	Høllin á Hálsi, Tórshavn; Attendance: 1,150; Referees: Pétursson, Þrastarson (ISL)
10 October 2021; 17:15	Hansen 4	(5–18)	Hansen 6	Høllin á Hálsi, Tórshavn; Attendance: 1,150; Referees: Pétursson, Þrastarson (ISL)
10 October 2021; 17:15	1× (yellow card) 2× (suspension)	Report	2× (yellow card) 3× (suspension)	Høllin á Hálsi, Tórshavn; Attendance: 1,150; Referees: Pétursson, Þrastarson (ISL)

10 October 2021; 18:10	Austria	33–33	Romania	BSFZ Südstadt, Maria Enzersdorf; Attendance: 800; Referees: Konjičanin, Konjičanin (BIH)
10 October 2021; 18:10	Frey 7	(11–16)	Bazaliu 11	BSFZ Südstadt, Maria Enzersdorf; Attendance: 800; Referees: Konjičanin, Konjičanin (BIH)
10 October 2021; 18:10	5× (suspension)	Report	5× (suspension) 1× (red card)	BSFZ Südstadt, Maria Enzersdorf; Attendance: 800; Referees: Konjičanin, Konjičanin (BIH)

2 March 2022; 17:05	Romania	28–35	Denmark	Sala sporturilor Mioveni, Mioveni; Attendance: 1,800; Referees: Merz, Kuttler (GER)
2 March 2022; 17:05	Pintea, Tiron 6	(13–19)	Friis 10	Sala sporturilor Mioveni, Mioveni; Attendance: 1,800; Referees: Merz, Kuttler (GER)
2 March 2022; 17:05	2× (yellow card) 3× (suspension)	Report	2× (yellow card) 2× (suspension)	Sala sporturilor Mioveni, Mioveni; Attendance: 1,800; Referees: Merz, Kuttler (GER)

2 March 2022; 20:00	Faroe Islands	24–29	Austria	Høllin á Hálsi, Tórshavn; Attendance: 453; Referees: Kull, Tint (EST)
2 March 2022; 20:00	Mittún 6	(12–15)	Kovács 8	Høllin á Hálsi, Tórshavn; Attendance: 453; Referees: Kull, Tint (EST)
2 March 2022; 20:00	1× (yellow card) 4× (suspension)	Report	1× (yellow card) 4× (suspension)	Høllin á Hálsi, Tórshavn; Attendance: 453; Referees: Kull, Tint (EST)

5 March 2022; 16:10	Denmark	32–27	Romania	Jyske Bank Arena, Odense; Attendance: 3,684; Referees: Bounouara, Sami (FRA)
5 March 2022; 16:10	Jørgensen 7	(13–10)	Pintea, Tîrcă 7	Jyske Bank Arena, Odense; Attendance: 3,684; Referees: Bounouara, Sami (FRA)
5 March 2022; 16:10	1× (yellow card) 4× (suspension)	Report	2× (suspension)	Jyske Bank Arena, Odense; Attendance: 3,684; Referees: Bounouara, Sami (FRA)

5 March 2022; 17:30	Austria	26–22	Faroe Islands	BSFZ Südstadt, Maria Enzersdorf; Attendance: 800; Referees: Bočáková, Jánošíková (SVK)
5 March 2022; 17:30	Tomasini 5	(14–10)	Geirsdóttir 12	BSFZ Südstadt, Maria Enzersdorf; Attendance: 800; Referees: Bočáková, Jánošíková (SVK)
5 March 2022; 17:30	1× (yellow card) 3× (suspension) 1× (red card)	Report	2× (yellow card) 2× (suspension)	BSFZ Südstadt, Maria Enzersdorf; Attendance: 800; Referees: Bočáková, Jánošíková (SVK)

20 April 2022; 20:00	Faroe Islands	21–31	Romania	Høllin á Hálsi, Tórshavn; Attendance: 753; Referees: Stokes, Bartlett (GBR)
20 April 2022; 20:00	Geirsdóttir 5	(11–13)	Pintea 8	Høllin á Hálsi, Tórshavn; Attendance: 753; Referees: Stokes, Bartlett (GBR)
20 April 2022; 20:00	2× (suspension)	Report	2× (yellow card) 3× (suspension)	Høllin á Hálsi, Tórshavn; Attendance: 753; Referees: Stokes, Bartlett (GBR)

20 April 2022; 20:25	Austria	22–38	Denmark	Raiffeisen Sportpark, Graz; Attendance: 1,700; Referees: Vujačić, Kažanegra (MNE)
20 April 2022; 20:25	Frey 5	(11–21)	Jørgensen, Tranborg 6	Raiffeisen Sportpark, Graz; Attendance: 1,700; Referees: Vujačić, Kažanegra (MNE)
20 April 2022; 20:25	1× (suspension)	Report	1× (suspension)	Raiffeisen Sportpark, Graz; Attendance: 1,700; Referees: Vujačić, Kažanegra (MNE)

23 April 2022; 16:10	Denmark	26–15	Faroe Islands	Næstved Arena, Næstved; Attendance: 2,524; Referees: Bytyqi, Kasapi (KOS)
23 April 2022; 16:10	Hansen, Jørgensen 5	(12–9)	Halsdóttir Weyhe 6	Næstved Arena, Næstved; Attendance: 2,524; Referees: Bytyqi, Kasapi (KOS)
23 April 2022; 16:10	6× (suspension)	Report	2× (yellow card) 5× (suspension)	Næstved Arena, Næstved; Attendance: 2,524; Referees: Bytyqi, Kasapi (KOS)

24 April 2022; 17:00	Romania	38–29	Austria	Traian Sports Hall, Râmnicu Vâlcea; Attendance: 2,200; Referees: Hatipoğlu, Şimşek (TUR)
24 April 2022; 17:00	Neagu 12	(19–13)	Frey, Neidhart 6	Traian Sports Hall, Râmnicu Vâlcea; Attendance: 2,200; Referees: Hatipoğlu, Şimşek (TUR)
24 April 2022; 17:00	1× (yellow card) 4× (suspension)	Report	6× (suspension)	Traian Sports Hall, Râmnicu Vâlcea; Attendance: 2,200; Referees: Hatipoğlu, Şimşek (TUR)

=== Group 3 ===
Pos	Team	Pld	W	D	L	GF	GA	GD	Pts	Qualification
1	Netherlands	6	6	0	0	184	106	+78	12	Final tournament
2	Germany	6	3	1	2	164	106	+58	7	Final tournament
3	Greece	6	2	0	4	66	151	−85	4	
4	Belarus (Note: Belarus was disqualified. (Note: Belarus was excluded after their involvement in the Russian invasion of Ukraine.))	6	0	1	5	51	102	−51	1	Disqualified

Source: EHF
Rules for classification: 1) points; 2) head-to-head points; 3) head-to-head goal difference; 4) head-to-head number of goals scored; 5) goal difference.
Notes:

6 October 2021; 18:00	Netherlands	38–27	Belarus	Topsportcentrum, Almere; Attendance: 3,550; Referees: Pirvu, Potirniche (ROU)
6 October 2021; 18:00	Malestein, Snelder 8	(21–16)	Ilyina, Vasileuskaya 6	Topsportcentrum, Almere; Attendance: 3,550; Referees: Pirvu, Potirniche (ROU)
6 October 2021; 18:00	2× (suspension)	Report	3× (suspension) 1× (red card)	Topsportcentrum, Almere; Attendance: 3,550; Referees: Pirvu, Potirniche (ROU)

7 October 2021; 20:15	Germany	36–10	Greece	Trier Arena, Trier; Attendance: 518; Referees: Stokes, Bartlett (GBR)
7 October 2021; 20:15	Berger 7	(17–8)	Chatziparasidou 3	Trier Arena, Trier; Attendance: 518; Referees: Stokes, Bartlett (GBR)
7 October 2021; 20:15	1× (yellow card) 1× (suspension)	Report	3× (suspension)	Trier Arena, Trier; Attendance: 518; Referees: Stokes, Bartlett (GBR)

10 October 2021; 16:00	Greece	14–35	Netherlands	Heraklion Indoor Sports Arena, Heraklion; Attendance: 110; Referees: Hofer, Schmidhuber (AUT)
10 October 2021; 16:00	Chatziparasidou, Gkatziou 3	(6–21)	Malestein, Van Wetering 6	Heraklion Indoor Sports Arena, Heraklion; Attendance: 110; Referees: Hofer, Schmidhuber (AUT)
10 October 2021; 16:00	3× (suspension)	Report	1× (yellow card) 3× (suspension)	Heraklion Indoor Sports Arena, Heraklion; Attendance: 110; Referees: Hofer, Schmidhuber (AUT)

10 October 2021; 19:30	Germany	24–24	Belarus	Trier Arena, Trier; Attendance: 667; Referees: Vranes, Wenninger (AUT)
10 October 2021; 19:30	Maidhof 10	(12–13)	Vasileuskaya 5	Trier Arena, Trier; Attendance: 667; Referees: Vranes, Wenninger (AUT)
10 October 2021; 19:30	4× (suspension)	Report	1× (yellow card) 5× (suspension)	Trier Arena, Trier; Attendance: 667; Referees: Vranes, Wenninger (AUT)

3 March 2022; 18:30	Germany	25–31	Netherlands	König Palast, Krefeld; Attendance: 1,780; Referees: Konjičanin, Konjičanin (BIH)
3 March 2022; 18:30	Bölk, Grijseels 6	(12–10)	Van Wetering 6	König Palast, Krefeld; Attendance: 1,780; Referees: Konjičanin, Konjičanin (BIH)
3 March 2022; 18:30	1× (yellow card) 5× (suspension)	Report	1× (yellow card) 6× (suspension)	König Palast, Krefeld; Attendance: 1,780; Referees: Konjičanin, Konjičanin (BIH)

5 March 2022; 16:00	Netherlands	30–29	Germany	Topsportcentrum Rotterdam, Rotterdam; Attendance: 2,000; Referees: Panayides, Andreou (CYP)
5 March 2022; 16:00	Malestein 6	(15–17)	Grijseels 7	Topsportcentrum Rotterdam, Rotterdam; Attendance: 2,000; Referees: Panayides, Andreou (CYP)
5 March 2022; 16:00	1× (yellow card) 4× (suspension)	Report	2× (yellow card) 4× (suspension)	Topsportcentrum Rotterdam, Rotterdam; Attendance: 2,000; Referees: Panayides, Andreou (CYP)

21 April 2022; 19:30	Greece	11–40	Germany	Topsportcentrum, Almere, Netherlands; Attendance: 100; Referees: Pétursson, Þrastarson (ISL)
21 April 2022; 19:30	Chatziparasidou, Kepesidou 3	(5–19)	Stockschläder 6	Topsportcentrum, Almere, Netherlands; Attendance: 100; Referees: Pétursson, Þrastarson (ISL)
21 April 2022; 19:30	2× (yellow card) 4× (suspension)	Report	1× (yellow card) 4× (suspension)	Topsportcentrum, Almere, Netherlands; Attendance: 100; Referees: Pétursson, Þrastarson (ISL)

24 April 2022; 16:00	Netherlands	40–11	Greece	Topsportcentrum, Almere; Attendance: 2,500; Referees: Weber, Weinquin (LUX)
24 April 2022; 16:00	Nüsser, Van Wetering 6	(19–8)	Argyropoulou 3	Topsportcentrum, Almere; Attendance: 2,500; Referees: Weber, Weinquin (LUX)
24 April 2022; 16:00	1× (yellow card) 1× (suspension)	Report	3× (suspension) 1× (red card)	Topsportcentrum, Almere; Attendance: 2,500; Referees: Weber, Weinquin (LUX)

Cancelled (Note: The matches, originally scheduled for March 2022, were cancelled due to the 2022 Russian invasion of Ukraine.)	Greece	10–0	Belarus

Cancelled	Belarus	0–10	Greece

Cancelled	Belarus	0–10	Netherlands

Cancelled	Belarus	0–10	Germany

=== Group 4 ===
Pos	Team	Pld	W	D	L	GF	GA	GD	Pts	Qualification
1	France	6	5	0	1	171	134	+37	10	Final tournament
2	Croatia	6	3	0	3	145	144	+1	6	Final tournament
3	Ukraine	6	1	2	3	95	113	−18	4	
4	Czech Republic	6	1	2	3	117	137	−20	4	

Source: EHF
Rules for classification: 1) points; 2) head-to-head points; 3) head-to-head goal difference; 4) head-to-head number of goals scored; 5) goal difference.

6 October 2021; 21:00	France	38–22	Czech Republic	Palais des Sports, Besançon; Attendance: 3,300; Referees: Sá, Sá (POR)
6 October 2021; 21:00	four players 5	(19–12)	Holaňová, Jeřábková 3	Palais des Sports, Besançon; Attendance: 3,300; Referees: Sá, Sá (POR)
6 October 2021; 21:00	1× (yellow card) 4× (suspension)	Report	2× (yellow card) 4× (suspension)	Palais des Sports, Besançon; Attendance: 3,300; Referees: Sá, Sá (POR)

7 October 2021; 17:30	Croatia	22–23	Ukraine	Centar Zamet, Rijeka; Attendance: 852; Referees: Christidi, Papamattheou (GRE)
7 October 2021; 17:30	Mičijević 8	(15–11)	Glibko 6	Centar Zamet, Rijeka; Attendance: 852; Referees: Christidi, Papamattheou (GRE)
7 October 2021; 17:30	1× (yellow card)	Report	1× (yellow card) 8× (suspension)	Centar Zamet, Rijeka; Attendance: 852; Referees: Christidi, Papamattheou (GRE)

10 October 2021; 17:00	Ukraine	25–28	France	Sport Manezh of Sumy State University, Sumy; Attendance: 850; Referees: Kijauskaitė, Žalienė (LTU)
10 October 2021; 17:00	Glibko 9	(15–16)	Nocandy 7	Sport Manezh of Sumy State University, Sumy; Attendance: 850; Referees: Kijauskaitė, Žalienė (LTU)
10 October 2021; 17:00	1× (yellow card) 7× (suspension)	Report	3× (suspension)	Sport Manezh of Sumy State University, Sumy; Attendance: 850; Referees: Kijauskaitė, Žalienė (LTU)

10 October 2021; 17:20	Czech Republic	24–26	Croatia	Datart Hala, Zlín; Attendance: 1,000; Referees: Năstase, Stancu (ROU)
10 October 2021; 17:20	Jeřábková 11	(14–14)	Blažević, Krsnik 6	Datart Hala, Zlín; Attendance: 1,000; Referees: Năstase, Stancu (ROU)
10 October 2021; 17:20	1× (yellow card) 2× (suspension)	Report	3× (yellow card) 5× (suspension)	Datart Hala, Zlín; Attendance: 1,000; Referees: Năstase, Stancu (ROU)

3 March 2022; 18:00	Croatia	19–21	France	ŠSD "Josip Samaržija-Bepo", Koprivnica; Attendance: 1,200; Referees: Ilieva, Karbeska (MKD)
3 March 2022; 18:00	Mamić 5	(8–12)	Lassource 4	ŠSD "Josip Samaržija-Bepo", Koprivnica; Attendance: 1,200; Referees: Ilieva, Karbeska (MKD)
3 March 2022; 18:00	1× (yellow card) 1× (suspension)	Report	2× (yellow card) 2× (suspension)	ŠSD "Josip Samaržija-Bepo", Koprivnica; Attendance: 1,200; Referees: Ilieva, Karbeska (MKD)

6 March 2022; 17:30	France	27–19	Croatia	Palais des sports André-Brouat, Toulouse; Attendance: 4,000; Referees: Álvarez, Bustamante (ESP)
6 March 2022; 17:30	four players 4	(13–9)	Milosavljević 4	Palais des sports André-Brouat, Toulouse; Attendance: 4,000; Referees: Álvarez, Bustamante (ESP)
6 March 2022; 17:30	4× (suspension)	Report	1× (yellow card) 5× (suspension)	Palais des sports André-Brouat, Toulouse; Attendance: 4,000; Referees: Álvarez, Bustamante (ESP)

20 April 2022; 18:00	Ukraine	19–26	Croatia	Raiffeisen Sportpark, Graz, Austria; Attendance: 450; Referees: Christiansen, Hansen (DEN)
20 April 2022; 18:00	Glibko 5	(11–12)	Turk 7	Raiffeisen Sportpark, Graz, Austria; Attendance: 450; Referees: Christiansen, Hansen (DEN)
20 April 2022; 18:00	1× (yellow card) 3× (suspension)	Report	1× (yellow card)	Raiffeisen Sportpark, Graz, Austria; Attendance: 450; Referees: Christiansen, Hansen (DEN)

20 April 2022; 20:00	Czech Republic	31–30	France	Městská sportovní hala TJ Lokomotiva, Plzeň; Attendance: 1,200; Referees: Merz, Kuttler (GER)
20 April 2022; 20:00	Jeřábková, Korešová 8	(16–13)	Foppa, Toublanc 4	Městská sportovní hala TJ Lokomotiva, Plzeň; Attendance: 1,200; Referees: Merz, Kuttler (GER)
20 April 2022; 20:00	2× (yellow card) 4× (suspension)	Report	1× (yellow card) 3× (suspension)	Městská sportovní hala TJ Lokomotiva, Plzeň; Attendance: 1,200; Referees: Merz, Kuttler (GER)

23 April 2022; 19:30	France	27–18	Ukraine	Dock Océane, Le Havre; Attendance: 2,800; Referees: Weijmans, Wolbertus (NED)
23 April 2022; 19:30	Horacek 5	(9–6)	Glibko 5	Dock Océane, Le Havre; Attendance: 2,800; Referees: Weijmans, Wolbertus (NED)
23 April 2022; 19:30	2× (yellow card) 1× (suspension)	Report	2× (yellow card) 2× (suspension)	Dock Océane, Le Havre; Attendance: 2,800; Referees: Weijmans, Wolbertus (NED)

24 April 2022; 18:00	Croatia	33–30	Czech Republic	Žatika Sport Centre, Poreč; Attendance: 1,400; Referees: Xhema, Jahja (KOS)
24 April 2022; 18:00	Blažević 11	(13–14)	Korešová 9	Žatika Sport Centre, Poreč; Attendance: 1,400; Referees: Xhema, Jahja (KOS)
24 April 2022; 18:00	2× (yellow card) 4× (suspension)	Report	1× (yellow card) 4× (suspension)	Žatika Sport Centre, Poreč; Attendance: 1,400; Referees: Xhema, Jahja (KOS)

Cancelled	Ukraine	5–5 (Note: The matches, originally scheduled for March 2022, were cancelled due to the 2022 Russian invasion of Ukraine. The games were counted as a 5–5 draw.)	Czech Republic

Cancelled	Czech Republic	5–5	Ukraine

=== Group 5 ===
Pos	Team	Pld	W	D	L	GF	GA	GD	Pts	Qualification
1	Hungary	6	5	0	1	177	146	+31	10 (Note: Hungary 58–57 Spain)	Final tournament
2	Spain	6	5	0	1	173	149	+24	10	Final tournament
3	Portugal	6	2	0	4	132	160	−28	4	
4	Slovakia	6	0	0	6	137	164	−27	0	

Source: EHF
Rules for classification: 1) points; 2) head-to-head points; 3) head-to-head goal difference; 4) head-to-head number of goals scored; 5) goal difference.
Notes:

6 October 2021; 18:00	Hungary	34–24	Portugal	Érd Aréna, Érd; Attendance: 1,800; Referees: Kulović, Škaljić (BIH)
6 October 2021; 18:00	Klujber 9	(17–15)	Resende 5	Érd Aréna, Érd; Attendance: 1,800; Referees: Kulović, Škaljić (BIH)
6 October 2021; 18:00	1× (yellow card) 3× (suspension)	Report	4× (suspension)	Érd Aréna, Érd; Attendance: 1,800; Referees: Kulović, Škaljić (BIH)

6 October 2021; 20:45	Spain	33–28	Slovakia	Pabellón Polideportivo Municipal Fernando Argüelles, Antequera; Attendance: 1,400; Referees: Backović, Palačković (SLO)
6 October 2021; 20:45	Fernández, González 6	(17–11)	Bíziková 9	Pabellón Polideportivo Municipal Fernando Argüelles, Antequera; Attendance: 1,400; Referees: Backović, Palačković (SLO)
6 October 2021; 20:45	1× (yellow card) 4× (suspension)	Report	4× (suspension)	Pabellón Polideportivo Municipal Fernando Argüelles, Antequera; Attendance: 1,400; Referees: Backović, Palačković (SLO)

10 October 2021; 18:00	Portugal	22–23	Spain	Pavilhão Multiusos de Paredes, Paredes; Attendance: 1,305; Referees: Geraets, Geraets (NED)
10 October 2021; 18:00	Unjanque 6	(11–14)	Cabral 6	Pavilhão Multiusos de Paredes, Paredes; Attendance: 1,305; Referees: Geraets, Geraets (NED)
10 October 2021; 18:00	2× (yellow card) 5× (suspension)	Report	1× (yellow card) 4× (suspension)	Pavilhão Multiusos de Paredes, Paredes; Attendance: 1,305; Referees: Geraets, Geraets (NED)

10 October 2021; 18:15	Slovakia	28–30	Hungary	Sporthalle Topoľčany, Topoľčany; Attendance: 650; Referees: Novikov, Rozhkov (UKR)
10 October 2021; 18:15	Szarková 10	(14–13)	Lukács 6	Sporthalle Topoľčany, Topoľčany; Attendance: 650; Referees: Novikov, Rozhkov (UKR)
10 October 2021; 18:15	2× (suspension)	Report	3× (suspension)	Sporthalle Topoľčany, Topoľčany; Attendance: 650; Referees: Novikov, Rozhkov (UKR)

2 March 2022; 18:00	Hungary	28–30	Spain	Tatabányai Multifunkciós Sportcsarnok, Tatabánya; Attendance: 4,500; Referees: Vujačić, Kažanegra (MNE)
2 March 2022; 18:00	Klujber, Szöllősi-Zácsik 7	(16–13)	Gutiérrez Bermejo 9	Tatabányai Multifunkciós Sportcsarnok, Tatabánya; Attendance: 4,500; Referees: Vujačić, Kažanegra (MNE)
2 March 2022; 18:00	3× (suspension)	Report	1× (yellow card) 1× (suspension)	Tatabányai Multifunkciós Sportcsarnok, Tatabánya; Attendance: 4,500; Referees: Vujačić, Kažanegra (MNE)

3 March 2022; 20:00	Portugal	24–21	Slovakia	Pavilhão Multiusos de Paredes, Paredes; Attendance: 1,500; Referees: Thiyagarajah, Thiyagarajah (GER)
3 March 2022; 20:00	Lima 5	(13–10)	Holejová 5	Pavilhão Multiusos de Paredes, Paredes; Attendance: 1,500; Referees: Thiyagarajah, Thiyagarajah (GER)
3 March 2022; 20:00	1× (yellow card) 3× (suspension)	Report	2× (yellow card) 3× (suspension)	Pavilhão Multiusos de Paredes, Paredes; Attendance: 1,500; Referees: Thiyagarajah, Thiyagarajah (GER)

5 March 2022; 20:00	Spain	27–30	Hungary	Palacio Deportes, Santander; Attendance: 5,000; Referees: Sekulić, Jovandić (SRB)
5 March 2022; 20:00	Gutiérrez Bermejo 5	(15–15)	Klujber, Szöllősi-Zácsik 6	Palacio Deportes, Santander; Attendance: 5,000; Referees: Sekulić, Jovandić (SRB)
5 March 2022; 20:00	1× (yellow card) 3× (suspension)	Report	5× (suspension)	Palacio Deportes, Santander; Attendance: 5,000; Referees: Sekulić, Jovandić (SRB)

6 March 2022; 15:00	Slovakia	21–23	Portugal	Sporthalle Topoľčany, Topoľčany; Attendance: 650; Referees: Mikelić, Parađina (CRO)
6 March 2022; 15:00	Trúnková 6	(14–12)	Da Silva 4	Sporthalle Topoľčany, Topoľčany; Attendance: 650; Referees: Mikelić, Parađina (CRO)
6 March 2022; 15:00	3× (yellow card) 7× (suspension)	Report	4× (suspension)	Sporthalle Topoľčany, Topoľčany; Attendance: 650; Referees: Mikelić, Parađina (CRO)

20 April 2022; 20:00	Slovakia	20–29	Spain	Chemkostav Arena, Michalovce; Attendance: 700; Referees: Yovchev, Yonchev (BUL)
20 April 2022; 20:00	Trúnková 6	(8–13)	three players 5	Chemkostav Arena, Michalovce; Attendance: 700; Referees: Yovchev, Yonchev (BUL)
20 April 2022; 20:00	1× (yellow card) 3× (suspension)	Report	1× (yellow card) 1× (suspension)	Chemkostav Arena, Michalovce; Attendance: 700; Referees: Yovchev, Yonchev (BUL)

21 April 2022; 20:00	Portugal	18–30	Hungary	Pavilhão Desportivo Municipal de Loulé, Loulé; Attendance: 800; Referees: Ciulei, Stanescu (ROU)
21 April 2022; 20:00	three players 3	(9–14)	Kuczora 7	Pavilhão Desportivo Municipal de Loulé, Loulé; Attendance: 800; Referees: Ciulei, Stanescu (ROU)
21 April 2022; 20:00	1× (yellow card) 2× (suspension)	Report	2× (yellow card) 4× (suspension)	Pavilhão Desportivo Municipal de Loulé, Loulé; Attendance: 800; Referees: Ciulei, Stanescu (ROU)

24 April 2022; 14:45	Hungary	25–19	Slovakia	Audi Aréna, Győr; Attendance: 2,200; Referees: Kijauskaitė, Žalienė (LTU)
24 April 2022; 14:45	Kuczora 5	(16–9)	three players 4	Audi Aréna, Győr; Attendance: 2,200; Referees: Kijauskaitė, Žalienė (LTU)
24 April 2022; 14:45	1× (yellow card) 4× (suspension)	Report	1× (yellow card) 3× (suspension)	Audi Aréna, Győr; Attendance: 2,200; Referees: Kijauskaitė, Žalienė (LTU)

24 April 2022; 19:00	Spain	31–21	Portugal	Polideportivo Artaleku, Irun; Referees: Rauchs, Linster (LUX)
24 April 2022; 19:00	Vegué Pena 7	(14–11)	Rodrigues Sabino 6	Polideportivo Artaleku, Irun; Referees: Rauchs, Linster (LUX)
24 April 2022; 19:00	1× (yellow card) 4× (suspension)	Report	6× (suspension)	Polideportivo Artaleku, Irun; Referees: Rauchs, Linster (LUX)

=== Group 6 ===
Pos	Team	Pld	W	D	L	GF	GA	GD	Pts	Qualification
1	Sweden	6	5	0	1	177	133	+44	10	Final tournament
2	Serbia	6	4	0	2	170	156	+14	8	Final tournament
3	Iceland	6	2	0	4	143	160	−17	4	
4	Turkey	6	1	0	5	153	194	−41	2	

Source: EHF
Rules for classification: 1) points; 2) head-to-head points; 3) head-to-head goal difference; 4) head-to-head number of goals scored; 5) goal difference.

6 October 2021; 18:00	Serbia	36–27	Turkey	Crystal Hall, Zrenjanin; Attendance: 1,000; Referees: Covalciuc, Covalciuc (MDA)
6 October 2021; 18:00	Stoiljković 6	(21–13)	Türkoglu 5	Crystal Hall, Zrenjanin; Attendance: 1,000; Referees: Covalciuc, Covalciuc (MDA)
6 October 2021; 18:00	2× (yellow card) 5× (suspension)	Report	1× (suspension)	Crystal Hall, Zrenjanin; Attendance: 1,000; Referees: Covalciuc, Covalciuc (MDA)

7 October 2021; 19:00	Sweden	30–17	Iceland	Stiga Sports Arena, Eskilstuna; Attendance: 2,184; Referees: Jerlecki, Łabuń (POL)
7 October 2021; 19:00	Roberts 6	(14–5)	Sturludóttir 4	Stiga Sports Arena, Eskilstuna; Attendance: 2,184; Referees: Jerlecki, Łabuń (POL)
7 October 2021; 19:00	1× (yellow card) 3× (suspension)	Report	1× (yellow card) 3× (suspension)	Stiga Sports Arena, Eskilstuna; Attendance: 2,184; Referees: Jerlecki, Łabuń (POL)

10 October 2021; 17:00	Turkey	23–31	Sweden	Porsuk Spor Salonu, Eskişehir; Attendance: 500; Referees: Aghakishi, Aghakishi (AZE)
10 October 2021; 17:00	Şahin 7	(12–15)	Strömberg 6	Porsuk Spor Salonu, Eskişehir; Attendance: 500; Referees: Aghakishi, Aghakishi (AZE)
10 October 2021; 17:00	5× (suspension)	Report	1× (yellow card) 3× (suspension)	Porsuk Spor Salonu, Eskişehir; Attendance: 500; Referees: Aghakishi, Aghakishi (AZE)

10 October 2021; 18:00	Iceland	23–21	Serbia	Íþróttamiðstöð Hauka, Hafnarfjörður; Attendance: 957; Referees: Bounouara, Sami (FRA)
10 October 2021; 18:00	Júlíusdóttir 7	(10–8)	Liščević, Stoiljković 4	Íþróttamiðstöð Hauka, Hafnarfjörður; Attendance: 957; Referees: Bounouara, Sami (FRA)
10 October 2021; 18:00	2× (yellow card) 3× (suspension)	Report	2× (yellow card) 2× (suspension)	Íþróttamiðstöð Hauka, Hafnarfjörður; Attendance: 957; Referees: Bounouara, Sami (FRA)

2 March 2022; 17:00	Turkey	30–29	Iceland	Merkez Spor Salonu, Kastamonu; Attendance: 3,500; Referees: Metalari, Nikolovski (MKD)
2 March 2022; 17:00	İskit 8	(15–16)	Thompson 7	Merkez Spor Salonu, Kastamonu; Attendance: 3,500; Referees: Metalari, Nikolovski (MKD)
2 March 2022; 17:00	2× (yellow card) 3× (suspension)	Report	4× (suspension)	Merkez Spor Salonu, Kastamonu; Attendance: 3,500; Referees: Metalari, Nikolovski (MKD)

3 March 2022; 18:00	Serbia	24–21	Sweden	Crystal Hall, Zrenjanin; Attendance: 2,000; Referees: Lovin, Stancu (ROU)
3 March 2022; 18:00	Lavko 6	(10–9)	Hagman 10	Crystal Hall, Zrenjanin; Attendance: 2,000; Referees: Lovin, Stancu (ROU)
3 March 2022; 18:00	2× (yellow card) 1× (suspension)	Report	1× (yellow card) 3× (suspension)	Crystal Hall, Zrenjanin; Attendance: 2,000; Referees: Lovin, Stancu (ROU)

5 March 2022; 17:00	Sweden	33–25	Serbia	Ystad Arena, Ystad; Attendance: 2,353; Referees: Sá, Sá (POR)
5 March 2022; 17:00	Roberts 8	(17–14)	Agbaba 4	Ystad Arena, Ystad; Attendance: 2,353; Referees: Sá, Sá (POR)
5 March 2022; 17:00	1× (yellow card) 5× (suspension) 1× (red card)	Report	1× (yellow card) 3× (suspension)	Ystad Arena, Ystad; Attendance: 2,353; Referees: Sá, Sá (POR)

6 March 2022; 17:00	Iceland	29–22	Turkey	Íþróttamiðstöð Hauka, Hafnarfjörður; Attendance: 1,107; Referees: Hannes, Hannes (GER)
6 March 2022; 17:00	Ómarsdóttir 7	(15–9)	Şahin 8	Íþróttamiðstöð Hauka, Hafnarfjörður; Attendance: 1,107; Referees: Hannes, Hannes (GER)
6 March 2022; 17:00	2× (yellow card) 1× (suspension)	Report	2× (yellow card) 1× (suspension)	Íþróttamiðstöð Hauka, Hafnarfjörður; Attendance: 1,107; Referees: Hannes, Hannes (GER)

20 April 2022; 16:30	Turkey	30–36	Serbia	Merkez Spor Salonu, Kastamonu; Attendance: 3,700; Referees: Andorka, Hucker (HUN)
20 April 2022; 16:30	İskit 6	(16–17)	Radosavljević 10	Merkez Spor Salonu, Kastamonu; Attendance: 3,700; Referees: Andorka, Hucker (HUN)
20 April 2022; 16:30	7× (suspension)	Report	1× (yellow card) 3× (suspension)	Merkez Spor Salonu, Kastamonu; Attendance: 3,700; Referees: Andorka, Hucker (HUN)

20 April 2022; 21:45	Iceland	23–29	Sweden	Íþróttamiðstöð Hauka, Hafnarfjörður; Attendance: 1,203; Referees: Braseth, Sundet (NOR)
20 April 2022; 21:45	R. Jónsdóttir 6	(12–17)	three players 5	Íþróttamiðstöð Hauka, Hafnarfjörður; Attendance: 1,203; Referees: Braseth, Sundet (NOR)
20 April 2022; 21:45	1× (yellow card) 2× (suspension)	Report	2× (suspension)	Íþróttamiðstöð Hauka, Hafnarfjörður; Attendance: 1,203; Referees: Braseth, Sundet (NOR)

23 April 2022; 18:00	Serbia	28–22	Iceland	Crystal Hall, Zrenjanin; Attendance: 3,000; Referees: Lindenbaum, Laron (ISR)
23 April 2022; 18:00	Stoiljković 7	(19–15)	three players 4	Crystal Hall, Zrenjanin; Attendance: 3,000; Referees: Lindenbaum, Laron (ISR)
23 April 2022; 18:00	4× (suspension)	Report	3× (yellow card) 2× (suspension)	Crystal Hall, Zrenjanin; Attendance: 3,000; Referees: Lindenbaum, Laron (ISR)

23 April 2022; 18:10	Sweden	33–21	Turkey	Helsingborg Arena, Helsingborg; Attendance: 2,307; Referees: Ilievski, Ilievski (MKD)
23 April 2022; 18:10	Hagman, Petrén 5	(13–9)	Şahin 6	Helsingborg Arena, Helsingborg; Attendance: 2,307; Referees: Ilievski, Ilievski (MKD)
23 April 2022; 18:10	1× (yellow card) 1× (suspension)	Report	2× (yellow card) 4× (suspension)	Helsingborg Arena, Helsingborg; Attendance: 2,307; Referees: Ilievski, Ilievski (MKD)

== Women's EHF Euro Cup ==
The Women's EHF Euro Cup was played between the three Co-hosts, Slovenia, North Macedonia and Montenegro, plus the defending champions, Norway. This is the inaugural Women's edition of the EHF Euro Cup. The winners were Norway, who won the group after 4 matches.

Pos	Team	Pld	W	D	L	GF	GA	GD	Pts
1	Norway (C)	6	6	0	0	183	133	+50	12
2	Montenegro	6	4	0	2	177	181	−4	8
3	Slovenia	6	2	0	4	152	170	−18	4
4	North Macedonia	6	0	0	6	144	172	−28	0

Source: EHF
Rules for classification: 1) points; 2) head-to-head points; 3) head-to-head goal difference; 4) head-to-head number of goals scored; 5) goal difference.
(C) Champions

7 October 2021; 18:55	Norway	29–17	Slovenia	Nadderud Arena, Bekkestua; Attendance: 1,526; Referees: Lidacka, Lesiak (POL)
7 October 2021; 18:55	three players 4	(14–9)	Stanko 6	Nadderud Arena, Bekkestua; Attendance: 1,526; Referees: Lidacka, Lesiak (POL)
7 October 2021; 18:55	3× (suspension)	Report	4× (suspension)	Nadderud Arena, Bekkestua; Attendance: 1,526; Referees: Lidacka, Lesiak (POL)

7 October 2021; 20:15	North Macedonia	21–29	Montenegro	Boris Trajkovski Arena, Skopje; Attendance: 500; Referees: Xhema, Jahja (KOS)
7 October 2021; 20:15	Ristovska 6	(9–13)	Grbić 10	Boris Trajkovski Arena, Skopje; Attendance: 500; Referees: Xhema, Jahja (KOS)
7 October 2021; 20:15	1× (yellow card) 3× (suspension)	Report	1× (yellow card) 5× (suspension)	Boris Trajkovski Arena, Skopje; Attendance: 500; Referees: Xhema, Jahja (KOS)

10 October 2021; 17:30	Slovenia	21–26	Norway	Arena Stozice, Ljubljana; Attendance: 835; Referees: Vitaku, Vitaku (KOS)
10 October 2021; 17:30	Varagić 5	(11–12)	Herrem 11	Arena Stozice, Ljubljana; Attendance: 835; Referees: Vitaku, Vitaku (KOS)
10 October 2021; 17:30	3× (suspension)	Report	1× (suspension)	Arena Stozice, Ljubljana; Attendance: 835; Referees: Vitaku, Vitaku (KOS)

10 October 2021; 20:00	Montenegro	31–30	North Macedonia	Sportski Centar, Niksic; Attendance: 100; Referees: Yovchev, Yovchev (BUL)
10 October 2021; 20:00	Radičević 9	(16–16)	Jankulovska 8	Sportski Centar, Niksic; Attendance: 100; Referees: Yovchev, Yovchev (BUL)
10 October 2021; 20:00	1× (yellow card) 6× (suspension)	Report	1× (yellow card) 3× (suspension)	Sportski Centar, Niksic; Attendance: 100; Referees: Yovchev, Yovchev (BUL)

2 March 2022; 18:00	Montenegro	27–32	Norway	Bemax Arena, Podgorica; Attendance: 2,000; Referees: Antić, Jakovljević (SRB)
2 March 2022; 18:00	Radičević 9	(15–16)	Brattset Dale 8	Bemax Arena, Podgorica; Attendance: 2,000; Referees: Antić, Jakovljević (SRB)
2 March 2022; 18:00	1× (yellow card) 2× (suspension)	Report	1× (yellow card) 1× (suspension)	Bemax Arena, Podgorica; Attendance: 2,000; Referees: Antić, Jakovljević (SRB)

3 March 2022; 18:00	Slovenia	29–28	North Macedonia	Zlatorog Arena, Celje; Attendance: 1,500; Referees: Praštalo, Balvan (BIH)
3 March 2022; 18:00	Gros 10	(15–14)	Stojkovska 8	Zlatorog Arena, Celje; Attendance: 1,500; Referees: Praštalo, Balvan (BIH)
3 March 2022; 18:00	1× (yellow card) 3× (suspension)	Report	1× (yellow card) 1× (suspension)	Zlatorog Arena, Celje; Attendance: 1,500; Referees: Praštalo, Balvan (BIH)

5 March 2022; 16:45	Norway	40–23	Montenegro	Boligmappa Arena, Larvik; Attendance: 2,570; Referees: Nygaard, Pedersen (DEN)
5 March 2022; 16:45	Reistad 7	(17–11)	Brnović 8	Boligmappa Arena, Larvik; Attendance: 2,570; Referees: Nygaard, Pedersen (DEN)
5 March 2022; 16:45	2× (suspension)	Report	2× (yellow card) 1× (suspension)	Boligmappa Arena, Larvik; Attendance: 2,570; Referees: Nygaard, Pedersen (DEN)

6 March 2022; 18:30	North Macedonia	20–27	Slovenia	Boris Trajkovski Arena, Skopje; Attendance: 800; Referees: Jakovljević, Kovačević (SRB)
6 March 2022; 18:30	Ristovska 7	(11–13)	Gros 7	Boris Trajkovski Arena, Skopje; Attendance: 800; Referees: Jakovljević, Kovačević (SRB)
6 March 2022; 18:30	1× (yellow card) 3× (suspension)	Report	1× (yellow card) 4× (suspension)	Boris Trajkovski Arena, Skopje; Attendance: 800; Referees: Jakovljević, Kovačević (SRB)

21 April 2022; 17:30	Slovenia	28–33	Montenegro	Arena Stozice, Ljubljana; Attendance: 400; Referees: Duplii, Pobedrina (UKR)
21 April 2022; 17:30	Gros 10	(12–11)	Radičević 9	Arena Stozice, Ljubljana; Attendance: 400; Referees: Duplii, Pobedrina (UKR)
21 April 2022; 17:30	2× (yellow card) 4× (suspension)	Report	1× (yellow card) 6× (suspension)	Arena Stozice, Ljubljana; Attendance: 400; Referees: Duplii, Pobedrina (UKR)

21 April 2022; 19:30	North Macedonia	18–24	Norway	Boris Trajkovski Arena, Skopje; Attendance: 1,050; Referees: Altmár, Horváth (HUN)
21 April 2022; 19:30	Sazdovska 6	(12–14)	Fauske 6	Boris Trajkovski Arena, Skopje; Attendance: 1,050; Referees: Altmár, Horváth (HUN)
21 April 2022; 19:30	3× (suspension)	Report	1× (yellow card) 3× (suspension)	Boris Trajkovski Arena, Skopje; Attendance: 1,050; Referees: Altmár, Horváth (HUN)

24 April 2022; 16:00	Norway	32–27	North Macedonia	Nadderud Arena, Bekkestua; Attendance: 1,460; Referees: Bočáková, Jánošíková (SVK)
24 April 2022; 16:00	Novak 9	(14–14)	Dabevska 5	Nadderud Arena, Bekkestua; Attendance: 1,460; Referees: Bočáková, Jánošíková (SVK)
24 April 2022; 16:00	1× (yellow card) 4× (suspension)	Report	1× (yellow card) 3× (suspension)	Nadderud Arena, Bekkestua; Attendance: 1,460; Referees: Bočáková, Jánošíková (SVK)

24 April 2022; 18:00	Montenegro	34–30	Slovenia	Bemax Arena, Podgorica; Attendance: 2,000; Referees: Mikelić, Parađina (CRO)
24 April 2022; 18:00	Radičević 11	(15–18)	Varagić 9	Bemax Arena, Podgorica; Attendance: 2,000; Referees: Mikelić, Parađina (CRO)
24 April 2022; 18:00	1× (yellow card) 3× (suspension)	Report	1× (yellow card) 6× (suspension)	Bemax Arena, Podgorica; Attendance: 2,000; Referees: Mikelić, Parađina (CRO)
