= 2019 European Women's U-19 Handball Championship =

Tournament details
- Host country: Hungary
- Venues: 2 (in 1 host city)
- Dates: 11–21 July
- Teams: 16 (from 1 confederation)

Final positions
- Champions: Hungary (1st title)
- Runners-up: Netherlands
- Third place: Norway
- Fourth place: Russia

Tournament statistics
- Matches played: 56
- Goals scored: 2,874 (51.32 per match)
- Attendance: 34,670 (619 per match)
- Top scorers: (Portugal) Joana Resende (55 goals)

Awards
- Best player: (Russia) Elena Mikhaylichenko

The 2019 European Women's U-19 Handball Championship was the twelfth edition of the European Women's U-19 Handball Championship, held in Győr, Hungary from 11 to 21 July 2019.

== Qualification ==
Competition	Dates	Host	Vacancies	Qualified
Women's 17 EHF EURO 2017	10–20 August 2017	(Slovakia) Michalovce	14	Germany; Norway; Hungary; France; Russia; Denmark; Romania; Spain; Sweden; Netherlands; Montenegro; Slovakia; Croatia; Austria
Women's 17 EHF Championship 2017	31 July – 6 August 2017	(North Macedonia) Skopje	1	Slovenia
Women's 17 EHF Championship 2017	14–20 August 2017	(Lithuania) Klaipėda	1	Portugal

== Draw ==
The draw was held on 26 February 2019 in Győr.

Pot 1	Pot 2	Pot 3	Pot 4
Germany; Norway; France; Hungary	Russia; Denmark; Romania; Spain	Sweden; Netherlands; Montenegro; Slovakia	Croatia; Austria; Portugal; Slovenia

== Preliminary round ==
All times are local (UTC+2).

=== Group A ===
Pos	Team	Pld	W	D	L	GF	GA	GD	Pts	Qualification
1	Russia	3	3	0	0	112	58	+54	6	Main round
2	France	3	2	0	1	80	67	+13	4	Main round
3	Slovakia	3	1	0	2	60	98	−38	2	Intermediate round
4	Slovenia	3	0	0	3	61	90	−29	0	Intermediate round

Source: EHF
Rules for classification: 1) points; 2) head-to-head points; 3) head-to-head goal difference; 4) head-to-head goals scored; 5) goal difference; 6) goals scored; 7) draw.

11 July 2019; 18:30	France	28–21	Slovakia	Magvassy Mihály Sportcsarnok, Győr; Attendance: 200; Referees: Boričić, Marković (SRB)
11 July 2019; 18:30	four players 4	(16–7)	Pastoreková 8	Magvassy Mihály Sportcsarnok, Győr; Attendance: 200; Referees: Boričić, Marković (SRB)
11 July 2019; 18:30	2× (yellow card) 7× (suspension)	Report	2× (yellow card) 3× (suspension)	Magvassy Mihály Sportcsarnok, Győr; Attendance: 200; Referees: Boričić, Marković (SRB)

11 July 2019; 20:30	Russia	36–21	Slovenia	Magvassy Mihály Sportcsarnok, Győr; Attendance: 200; Referees: Manea, Iliescu (ROU)
11 July 2019; 20:30	Maslova 10	(18–10)	three players 3	Magvassy Mihály Sportcsarnok, Győr; Attendance: 200; Referees: Manea, Iliescu (ROU)
11 July 2019; 20:30	1× (yellow card) 4× (suspension)	Report	3× (yellow card) 3× (suspension)	Magvassy Mihály Sportcsarnok, Győr; Attendance: 200; Referees: Manea, Iliescu (ROU)

12 July 2019; 18:30	Slovenia	16–28	France	Magvassy Mihály Sportcsarnok, Győr; Attendance: 200; Referees: Smailagic, Smailagic (SWE)
12 July 2019; 18:30	Cerovak 4	(5–15)	Jacques 5	Magvassy Mihály Sportcsarnok, Győr; Attendance: 200; Referees: Smailagic, Smailagic (SWE)
12 July 2019; 18:30	6× (suspension)	Report	5× (suspension)	Magvassy Mihály Sportcsarnok, Győr; Attendance: 200; Referees: Smailagic, Smailagic (SWE)

12 July 2019; 20:30	Slovakia	13–46	Russia	Magvassy Mihály Sportcsarnok, Győr; Attendance: 150; Referees: Sá, Sá (POR)
12 July 2019; 20:30	Jagodič 4	(5–23)	four players 5	Magvassy Mihály Sportcsarnok, Győr; Attendance: 150; Referees: Sá, Sá (POR)
12 July 2019; 20:30	1× (yellow card) 6× (suspension)	Report	2× (yellow card) 1× (suspension)	Magvassy Mihály Sportcsarnok, Győr; Attendance: 150; Referees: Sá, Sá (POR)

14 July 2019; 18:30	France	24–30	Russia	Magvassy Mihály Sportcsarnok, Győr; Attendance: 200; Referees: Mitrović, Kažanegra (MNE)
14 July 2019; 18:30	Peillon 6	(14–17)	Mikhaylichenko 9	Magvassy Mihály Sportcsarnok, Győr; Attendance: 200; Referees: Mitrović, Kažanegra (MNE)
14 July 2019; 18:30	1× (yellow card) 2× (suspension)	Report	6× (suspension)	Magvassy Mihály Sportcsarnok, Győr; Attendance: 200; Referees: Mitrović, Kažanegra (MNE)

14 July 2019; 20:30	Slovakia	26–24	Slovenia	Magvassy Mihály Sportcsarnok, Győr; Attendance: 350; Referees: Fremstad, Pedersen (NOR)
14 July 2019; 20:30	Pastoreková 8	(12–12)	Cerovak 5	Magvassy Mihály Sportcsarnok, Győr; Attendance: 350; Referees: Fremstad, Pedersen (NOR)
14 July 2019; 20:30	1× (yellow card) 4× (suspension)	Report	7× (suspension)	Magvassy Mihály Sportcsarnok, Győr; Attendance: 350; Referees: Fremstad, Pedersen (NOR)

=== Group B ===
Pos	Team	Pld	W	D	L	GF	GA	GD	Pts	Qualification
1	Netherlands	3	3	0	0	85	73	+12	6	Main round
2	Denmark	3	2	0	1	77	67	+10	4	Main round
3	Germany	3	1	0	2	81	80	+1	2	Intermediate round
4	Croatia	3	0	0	3	57	80	−23	0	Intermediate round

Source: EHF
Rules for classification: 1) points; 2) head-to-head points; 3) head-to-head goal difference; 4) head-to-head goals scored; 5) goal difference; 6) goals scored; 7) draw.

11 July 2019; 14:30	Germany	30–31	Netherlands	Magvassy Mihály Sportcsarnok, Győr; Attendance: 300; Referees: Sá, Sá (POR)
11 July 2019; 14:30	Bleckmann, Uhlmann 6	(13–17)	Sprengers 13	Magvassy Mihály Sportcsarnok, Győr; Attendance: 300; Referees: Sá, Sá (POR)
11 July 2019; 14:30	2× (yellow card) 6× (suspension) 1× (red card)	Report	2× (yellow card) 5× (suspension)	Magvassy Mihály Sportcsarnok, Győr; Attendance: 300; Referees: Sá, Sá (POR)

11 July 2019; 16:30	Denmark	24–18	Croatia	Magvassy Mihály Sportcsarnok, Győr; Attendance: 300; Referees: Smailagic, Smailagic (SWE)
11 July 2019; 16:30	Aagot 6	(13–6)	Guskić 6	Magvassy Mihály Sportcsarnok, Győr; Attendance: 300; Referees: Smailagic, Smailagic (SWE)
11 July 2019; 16:30	2× (yellow card) 6× (suspension)	Report	1× (yellow card) 3× (suspension)	Magvassy Mihály Sportcsarnok, Győr; Attendance: 300; Referees: Smailagic, Smailagic (SWE)

12 July 2019; 14:30	Croatia	16–26	Germany	Magvassy Mihály Sportcsarnok, Győr; Attendance: 300; Referees: Fremstad, Pedersen (NOR)
12 July 2019; 14:30	Guskić, Jandrašić 5	(11–11)	Bleckmann 10	Magvassy Mihály Sportcsarnok, Győr; Attendance: 300; Referees: Fremstad, Pedersen (NOR)
12 July 2019; 14:30	8× (suspension)	Report	5× (suspension)	Magvassy Mihály Sportcsarnok, Győr; Attendance: 300; Referees: Fremstad, Pedersen (NOR)

12 July 2019; 16:30	Netherlands	24–20	Denmark	Magvassy Mihály Sportcsarnok, Győr; Attendance: 500; Referees: Mitrović, Kažanegra (MNE)
12 July 2019; 16:30	Krullaars, van der Vliet 6	(9–11)	Steffensen 7	Magvassy Mihály Sportcsarnok, Győr; Attendance: 500; Referees: Mitrović, Kažanegra (MNE)
12 July 2019; 16:30	1× (yellow card) 3× (suspension)	Report	1× (yellow card) 3× (suspension)	Magvassy Mihály Sportcsarnok, Győr; Attendance: 500; Referees: Mitrović, Kažanegra (MNE)

14 July 2019; 14:30	Germany	25–33	Denmark	Magvassy Mihály Sportcsarnok, Győr; Attendance: 200; Referees: Manea, Iliescu (ROU)
14 July 2019; 14:30	Bleckmann 7	(7–17)	Aagot, Møller 5	Magvassy Mihály Sportcsarnok, Győr; Attendance: 200; Referees: Manea, Iliescu (ROU)
14 July 2019; 14:30	4× (suspension)	Report	1× (yellow card) 3× (suspension)	Magvassy Mihály Sportcsarnok, Győr; Attendance: 200; Referees: Manea, Iliescu (ROU)

14 July 2019; 16:30	Netherlands	30–23	Croatia	Magvassy Mihály Sportcsarnok, Győr; Attendance: 300; Referees: Smailagic, Smailagic (SWE)
14 July 2019; 16:30	Dekker 9	(19–11)	Guskić 9	Magvassy Mihály Sportcsarnok, Győr; Attendance: 300; Referees: Smailagic, Smailagic (SWE)
14 July 2019; 16:30	1× (yellow card) 6× (suspension)	Report	4× (suspension)	Magvassy Mihály Sportcsarnok, Győr; Attendance: 300; Referees: Smailagic, Smailagic (SWE)

=== Group C ===
Pos	Team	Pld	W	D	L	GF	GA	GD	Pts	Qualification
1	Hungary (H)	3	3	0	0	99	72	+27	6	Main round
2	Spain	3	1	1	1	77	76	+1	3	Main round
3	Austria	3	1	0	2	76	90	−14	2	Intermediate round
4	Montenegro	3	0	1	2	57	71	−14	1	Intermediate round

Source: EHF
Rules for classification: 1) points; 2) head-to-head points; 3) head-to-head goal difference; 4) head-to-head goals scored; 5) goal difference; 6) goals scored; 7) draw.
(H) Hosts

11 July 2019; 18:30	Hungary	27–18	Montenegro	Audi Aréna Győr, Győr; Attendance: 2,500; Referees: Praštalo, Balvan (BIH)
11 July 2019; 18:30	three players 4	(15–7)	Raičević 6	Audi Aréna Győr, Győr; Attendance: 2,500; Referees: Praštalo, Balvan (BIH)
11 July 2019; 18:30	3× (yellow card) 2× (suspension)	Report	1× (yellow card) 4× (suspension)	Audi Aréna Győr, Győr; Attendance: 2,500; Referees: Praštalo, Balvan (BIH)

11 July 2019; 20:30	Spain	33–22	Austria	Audi Aréna Győr, Győr; Attendance: 300; Referees: Metalari, Nikolovski (MKD)
11 July 2019; 20:30	Arcos, Morales 6	(17–11)	Draguljic, Kofler 4	Audi Aréna Győr, Győr; Attendance: 300; Referees: Metalari, Nikolovski (MKD)
11 July 2019; 20:30	1× (yellow card) 4× (suspension)	Report	3× (suspension)	Audi Aréna Győr, Győr; Attendance: 300; Referees: Metalari, Nikolovski (MKD)

12 July 2019; 18:30	Austria	31–39	Hungary	Audi Aréna Győr, Győr; Attendance: 2,000; Referees: Boričić, Marković (SRB)
12 July 2019; 18:30	Reichert 8	(15–21)	Albek, Schatzl 5	Audi Aréna Győr, Győr; Attendance: 2,000; Referees: Boričić, Marković (SRB)
12 July 2019; 18:30	6× (suspension)	Report	3× (yellow card) 6× (suspension)	Audi Aréna Győr, Győr; Attendance: 2,000; Referees: Boričić, Marković (SRB)

12 July 2019; 20:30	Montenegro	21–21	Spain	Audi Aréna Győr, Győr; Attendance: 300; Referees: Pétursson, Þrastarson (ISL)
12 July 2019; 20:30	Knežević 8	(11–10)	Moreno 7	Audi Aréna Győr, Győr; Attendance: 300; Referees: Pétursson, Þrastarson (ISL)
12 July 2019; 20:30	2× (yellow card) 7× (suspension) 1× (red card)	Report	4× (suspension)	Audi Aréna Győr, Győr; Attendance: 300; Referees: Pétursson, Þrastarson (ISL)

14 July 2019; 18:30	Hungary	33–23	Spain	Audi Aréna Győr, Győr; Attendance: 2,500; Referees: Metalari, Nikolovski (MKD)
14 July 2019; 18:30	Kácsor 7	(18–11)	Arcos 8	Audi Aréna Győr, Győr; Attendance: 2,500; Referees: Metalari, Nikolovski (MKD)
14 July 2019; 18:30	1× (yellow card) 5× (suspension)	Report	1× (yellow card) 1× (suspension)	Audi Aréna Győr, Győr; Attendance: 2,500; Referees: Metalari, Nikolovski (MKD)

14 July 2019; 20:30	Montenegro	18–23	Austria	Audi Aréna Győr, Győr; Attendance: 200; Referees: Geraets, Geraets (NED)
14 July 2019; 20:30	Ćorović 4	(8–14)	Neidhart, Reichert 6	Audi Aréna Győr, Győr; Attendance: 200; Referees: Geraets, Geraets (NED)
14 July 2019; 20:30	2× (yellow card) 8× (suspension) 1× (red card)	Report	2× (suspension)	Audi Aréna Győr, Győr; Attendance: 200; Referees: Geraets, Geraets (NED)

=== Group D ===
Pos	Team	Pld	W	D	L	GF	GA	GD	Pts	Qualification
1	Norway	3	3	0	0	93	68	+25	6	Main round
2	Romania	3	2	0	1	83	76	+7	4	Main round
3	Portugal	3	1	0	2	77	77	0	2	Intermediate round
4	Sweden	3	0	0	3	55	87	−32	0	Intermediate round

Source: EHF
Rules for classification: 1) points; 2) head-to-head points; 3) head-to-head goal difference; 4) head-to-head goals scored; 5) goal difference; 6) goals scored; 7) draw.

11 July 2019; 14:15	Norway	33–16	Sweden	Audi Aréna Győr, Győr; Attendance: 150; Referees: Pétursson, Þrastarson (ISL)
11 July 2019; 14:15	Alver 9	(21–9)	Fredén 4	Audi Aréna Győr, Győr; Attendance: 150; Referees: Pétursson, Þrastarson (ISL)
11 July 2019; 14:15	2× (yellow card) 6× (suspension)	Report	1× (yellow card) 7× (suspension)	Audi Aréna Győr, Győr; Attendance: 150; Referees: Pétursson, Þrastarson (ISL)

11 July 2019; 16:15	Romania	28–26	Portugal	Audi Aréna Győr, Győr; Attendance: 300; Referees: Geraets, Geraets (NED)
11 July 2019; 16:15	Moroianu 8	(14–13)	Resende, Sousa 8	Audi Aréna Győr, Győr; Attendance: 300; Referees: Geraets, Geraets (NED)
11 July 2019; 16:15	2× (yellow card) 1× (suspension)	Report	2× (yellow card) 5× (suspension) 1× (red card)	Audi Aréna Győr, Győr; Attendance: 300; Referees: Geraets, Geraets (NED)

12 July 2019; 14:30	Portugal	27–30	Norway	Audi Aréna Győr, Győr; Attendance: 150; Referees: Metalari, Nikolovski (MKD)
12 July 2019; 14:30	Sousa 10	(14–18)	four players 4	Audi Aréna Győr, Győr; Attendance: 150; Referees: Metalari, Nikolovski (MKD)
12 July 2019; 14:30	1× (yellow card) 6× (suspension)	Report	1× (yellow card) 4× (suspension)	Audi Aréna Győr, Győr; Attendance: 150; Referees: Metalari, Nikolovski (MKD)

12 July 2019; 16:30	Sweden	20–30	Romania	Audi Aréna Győr, Győr; Attendance: 500; Referees: Geraets, Geraets (NED)
12 July 2019; 16:30	Rundcrantz 6	(6–18)	Moraru 7	Audi Aréna Győr, Győr; Attendance: 500; Referees: Geraets, Geraets (NED)
12 July 2019; 16:30	3× (suspension)	Report	1× (yellow card) 4× (suspension)	Audi Aréna Győr, Győr; Attendance: 500; Referees: Geraets, Geraets (NED)

14 July 2019; 14:30	Norway	30–25	Romania	Audi Aréna Győr, Győr; Attendance: 200; Referees: Praštalo, Balvan (BIH)
14 July 2019; 14:30	L. Deila 6	(15–13)	Popa 9	Audi Aréna Győr, Győr; Attendance: 200; Referees: Praštalo, Balvan (BIH)
14 July 2019; 14:30	1× (yellow card) 5× (suspension)	Report	4× (suspension)	Audi Aréna Győr, Győr; Attendance: 200; Referees: Praštalo, Balvan (BIH)

14 July 2019; 16:30	Sweden	19–24	Portugal	Audi Aréna Győr, Győr; Attendance: 400; Referees: Boričić, Marković (SRB)
14 July 2019; 16:30	Andersson 6	(8–8)	Resende, Sousa 8	Audi Aréna Győr, Győr; Attendance: 400; Referees: Boričić, Marković (SRB)
14 July 2019; 16:30	1× (yellow card) 1× (suspension)	Report	1× (yellow card) 4× (suspension)	Audi Aréna Győr, Győr; Attendance: 400; Referees: Boričić, Marković (SRB)

== Intermediate round ==
=== Group III ===
Pos	Team	Pld	W	D	L	GF	GA	GD	Pts	Qualification
1	Germany	3	3	0	0	97	50	+47	6	9–12th place semifinals
2	Croatia	3	2	0	1	87	72	+15	4	9–12th place semifinals
3	Slovakia	3	1	0	2	68	101	−33	2	13–16th place semifinals
4	Slovenia	3	0	0	3	62	91	−29	0	13–16th place semifinals

Source: EHF
Rules for classification: 1) points; 2) head-to-head points; 3) head-to-head goal difference; 4) head-to-head goals scored; 5) goal difference; 6) goals scored; 7) draw.

16 July 2019; 14:30	Slovenia	22–33	Croatia	Magvassy Mihály Sportcsarnok, Győr; Attendance: 100; Referees: Sá, Sá (POR)
16 July 2019; 14:30	Cerovak 5	(11–20)	Franušić 9	Magvassy Mihály Sportcsarnok, Győr; Attendance: 100; Referees: Sá, Sá (POR)
16 July 2019; 14:30	5× (suspension)	Report	2× (yellow card) 4× (suspension)	Magvassy Mihály Sportcsarnok, Győr; Attendance: 100; Referees: Sá, Sá (POR)

16 July 2019; 16:30	Slovakia	18–39	Germany	Magvassy Mihály Sportcsarnok, Győr; Attendance: 200; Referees: Pétursson, Þrastarson (ISL)
16 July 2019; 16:30	four players 3	(5–19)	Wulf 7	Magvassy Mihály Sportcsarnok, Győr; Attendance: 200; Referees: Pétursson, Þrastarson (ISL)
16 July 2019; 16:30	2× (yellow card) 5× (suspension)	Report	1× (yellow card) 6× (suspension)	Magvassy Mihály Sportcsarnok, Győr; Attendance: 200; Referees: Pétursson, Þrastarson (ISL)

17 July 2019; 14:30	Croatia	38–24	Slovakia	Magvassy Mihály Sportcsarnok, Győr; Attendance: 50; Referees: Geraets, Geraets (NED)
17 July 2019; 14:30	Franušić 8	(21–14)	Jagodič, Tomašechová 5	Magvassy Mihály Sportcsarnok, Győr; Attendance: 50; Referees: Geraets, Geraets (NED)
17 July 2019; 14:30	5× (suspension)	Report	1× (yellow card) 5× (suspension)	Magvassy Mihály Sportcsarnok, Győr; Attendance: 50; Referees: Geraets, Geraets (NED)

17 July 2019; 16:30	Germany	32–16	Slovenia	Magvassy Mihály Sportcsarnok, Győr; Attendance: 100; Referees: Praštalo, Balvan (BIH)
17 July 2019; 16:30	Bleckmann 11	(17–7)	Krese 6	Magvassy Mihály Sportcsarnok, Győr; Attendance: 100; Referees: Praštalo, Balvan (BIH)
17 July 2019; 16:30	2× (yellow card) 2× (suspension)	Report	2× (yellow card) 2× (suspension)	Magvassy Mihály Sportcsarnok, Győr; Attendance: 100; Referees: Praštalo, Balvan (BIH)

=== Group IV ===
Pos	Team	Pld	W	D	L	GF	GA	GD	Pts	Qualification
1	Austria	3	2	0	1	74	74	0	4 (Note: Montenegro 18–23 Austria)	9–12th place semifinals
2	Montenegro	3	2	0	1	60	61	−1	4	9–12th place semifinals
3	Portugal	3	1	0	2	67	69	−2	2 (Note: Sweden 19–24 Portugal)	13–16th place semifinals
4	Sweden	3	1	0	2	70	67	+3	2	13–16th place semifinals

Source: EHF
Rules for classification: 1) points; 2) head-to-head points; 3) head-to-head goal difference; 4) head-to-head goals scored; 5) goal difference; 6) goals scored; 7) draw.
Notes:

16 July 2019; 14:30	Montenegro	20–19	Sweden	Audi Aréna Győr, Győr; Attendance: 200; Referees: Praštalo, Balvan (BIH)
16 July 2019; 14:30	Knežević 9	(9–8)	Andersson 5	Audi Aréna Győr, Győr; Attendance: 200; Referees: Praštalo, Balvan (BIH)
16 July 2019; 14:30	2× (yellow card) 1× (suspension)	Report	3× (yellow card)	Audi Aréna Győr, Győr; Attendance: 200; Referees: Praštalo, Balvan (BIH)

16 July 2019; 16:30	Austria	28–24	Portugal	Audi Aréna Győr, Győr; Attendance: 300; Referees: Fremstad, Pedersen (NOR)
16 July 2019; 16:30	three players 6	(15–5)	Resende 9	Audi Aréna Győr, Győr; Attendance: 300; Referees: Fremstad, Pedersen (NOR)
16 July 2019; 16:30	4× (suspension)	Report	2× (yellow card) 3× (suspension)	Audi Aréna Győr, Győr; Attendance: 300; Referees: Fremstad, Pedersen (NOR)

17 July 2019; 14:30	Sweden	32–23	Austria	Audi Aréna Győr, Győr; Attendance: 100; Referees: Manea, Iliescu (ROU)
17 July 2019; 14:30	Boqvist 7	(17–12)	Neidhart 5	Audi Aréna Győr, Győr; Attendance: 100; Referees: Manea, Iliescu (ROU)
17 July 2019; 14:30	1× (yellow card) 3× (suspension)	Report	2× (yellow card) 3× (suspension)	Audi Aréna Győr, Győr; Attendance: 100; Referees: Manea, Iliescu (ROU)

17 July 2019; 16:30	Portugal	19–22	Montenegro	Audi Aréna Győr, Győr; Attendance: 300; Referees: Fremstad, Pedersen (NOR)
17 July 2019; 16:30	Resende 6	(8–13)	Knežević, Radović 6	Audi Aréna Győr, Győr; Attendance: 300; Referees: Fremstad, Pedersen (NOR)
17 July 2019; 16:30	1× (yellow card) 1× (suspension)	Report	2× (yellow card) 2× (suspension)	Audi Aréna Győr, Győr; Attendance: 300; Referees: Fremstad, Pedersen (NOR)

== Main round ==
=== Group I ===
Pos	Team	Pld	W	D	L	GF	GA	GD	Pts	Qualification
1	Netherlands	3	2	0	1	83	79	+4	4 (Note: Russia 28–31 Netherlands)	Semifinals
2	Russia	3	2	0	1	88	78	+10	4	Semifinals
3	Denmark	3	1	0	2	66	76	−10	2 (Note: France 22–23 Denmark)	5–8th place semifinals
4	France	3	1	0	2	77	81	−4	2	5–8th place semifinals

Source: EHF
Rules for classification: 1) points; 2) head-to-head points; 3) head-to-head goal difference; 4) head-to-head goals scored; 5) goal difference; 6) goals scored; 7) draw.
Notes:

16 July 2019; 18:30	France	22–23	Denmark	Magvassy Mihály Sportcsarnok, Győr; Attendance: 150; Referees: Manea, Iliescu (ROU)
16 July 2019; 18:30	Wajoka 6	(11–11)	Halilcevic, Møller 5	Magvassy Mihály Sportcsarnok, Győr; Attendance: 150; Referees: Manea, Iliescu (ROU)
16 July 2019; 18:30	5× (suspension)	Report	3× (yellow card) 2× (suspension)	Magvassy Mihály Sportcsarnok, Győr; Attendance: 150; Referees: Manea, Iliescu (ROU)

16 July 2019; 20:30	Russia	28–31	Netherlands	Magvassy Mihály Sportcsarnok, Győr; Attendance: 400; Referees: Metalari, Nikolovski (MKD)
16 July 2019; 20:30	Mikhaylichenko 10	(15–13)	van der Vliet 8	Magvassy Mihály Sportcsarnok, Győr; Attendance: 400; Referees: Metalari, Nikolovski (MKD)
16 July 2019; 20:30	1× (yellow card) 3× (suspension)	Report	3× (suspension)	Magvassy Mihály Sportcsarnok, Győr; Attendance: 400; Referees: Metalari, Nikolovski (MKD)

17 July 2019; 18:30	Denmark	23–30	Russia	Magvassy Mihály Sportcsarnok, Győr; Attendance: 500; Referees: Boričić, Marković (SRB)
17 July 2019; 18:30	Andreasen 7	(12–15)	Maslova 11	Magvassy Mihály Sportcsarnok, Győr; Attendance: 500; Referees: Boričić, Marković (SRB)
17 July 2019; 18:30	4× (suspension)	Report	1× (yellow card) 5× (suspension)	Magvassy Mihály Sportcsarnok, Győr; Attendance: 500; Referees: Boričić, Marković (SRB)

17 July 2019; 20:30	Netherlands	28–31	France	Magvassy Mihály Sportcsarnok, Győr; Attendance: 200; Referees: Pétursson, Þrastarson (ISL)
17 July 2019; 20:30	Dekker 5	(13–15)	Lasm 8	Magvassy Mihály Sportcsarnok, Győr; Attendance: 200; Referees: Pétursson, Þrastarson (ISL)
17 July 2019; 20:30	1× (yellow card) 4× (suspension)	Report	3× (suspension) 1× (red card)	Magvassy Mihály Sportcsarnok, Győr; Attendance: 200; Referees: Pétursson, Þrastarson (ISL)

=== Group II ===
Pos	Team	Pld	W	D	L	GF	GA	GD	Pts	Qualification
1	Hungary (H)	3	3	0	0	92	68	+24	6	Semifinals
2	Norway	3	2	0	1	77	74	+3	4	Semifinals
3	Romania	3	1	0	2	75	85	−10	2	5–8th place semifinals
4	Spain	3	0	0	3	68	85	−17	0	5–8th place semifinals

Source: EHF
Rules for classification: 1) points; 2) head-to-head points; 3) head-to-head goal difference; 4) head-to-head goals scored; 5) goal difference; 6) goals scored; 7) draw.
(H) Hosts

16 July 2019; 18:30	Spain	24–29	Romania	Audi Aréna Győr, Győr; Attendance: 250; Referees: Smailagic, Smailagic (SWE)
16 July 2019; 18:30	Arcos 6	(12–14)	Şamanț 6	Audi Aréna Győr, Győr; Attendance: 250; Referees: Smailagic, Smailagic (SWE)
16 July 2019; 18:30	1× (yellow card) 2× (suspension)	Report	1× (yellow card) 4× (suspension)	Audi Aréna Győr, Győr; Attendance: 250; Referees: Smailagic, Smailagic (SWE)

16 July 2019; 20:30	Hungary	28–24	Norway	Audi Aréna Győr, Győr; Attendance: 3,000; Referees: Boričić, Marković (SRB)
16 July 2019; 20:30	Kuczora 6	(16–12)	Hansen, Moen 5	Audi Aréna Győr, Győr; Attendance: 3,000; Referees: Boričić, Marković (SRB)
16 July 2019; 20:30	1× (yellow card) 4× (suspension)	Report	1× (yellow card) 5× (suspension)	Audi Aréna Győr, Győr; Attendance: 3,000; Referees: Boričić, Marković (SRB)

17 July 2019; 18:30	Romania	21–31	Hungary	Audi Aréna Győr, Győr; Attendance: 3,000; Referees: Mitrović, Kažanegra (MNE)
17 July 2019; 18:30	Jipa, Popa 4	(11–12)	Kuczora 5	Audi Aréna Győr, Győr; Attendance: 3,000; Referees: Mitrović, Kažanegra (MNE)
17 July 2019; 18:30	1× (yellow card) 2× (suspension)	Report	2× (yellow card) 4× (suspension)	Audi Aréna Győr, Győr; Attendance: 3,000; Referees: Mitrović, Kažanegra (MNE)

17 July 2019; 20:30	Norway	23–21	Spain	Audi Aréna Győr, Győr; Attendance: 150; Referees: Sá, Sá (POR)
17 July 2019; 20:30	Alver 6	(16–13)	Fernández-Agustí 4	Audi Aréna Győr, Győr; Attendance: 150; Referees: Sá, Sá (POR)
17 July 2019; 20:30	3× (yellow card) 5× (suspension)	Report	1× (yellow card) 6× (suspension)	Audi Aréna Győr, Győr; Attendance: 150; Referees: Sá, Sá (POR)

== Final round ==
=== Bracket ===
Championship bracket

Semifinals
19 July
Netherlands	31
Norway	29
19 July
Hungary	29
Russia	27

Final
21 July
Netherlands	20
Hungary	27
Third place
21 July
Norway	29
Russia	26

9th place bracket

9–12th place semifinals
19 July
Germany	22
Montenegro	13
19 July
Austria	24
Croatia (ET)	27

9th place
20 July
Germany	23
Croatia	22
11th place
20 July
Montenegro	15
Austria	22

5th place bracket

5–8th place semifinals
19 July
Denmark	27
Spain	23
19 July
Romania	37
France	27

5th place
21 July
Denmark	26
Romania	34
7th place
21 July
Spain	27
France	26

13th place bracket

13–16th place semifinals
19 July
Slovakia	21
Sweden	32
19 July
Portugal	28
Slovenia	25

13th place
20 July
Sweden	25
Portugal	24
15th place
20 July
Slovakia	23
Slovenia	27

=== 13–16th place semifinals ===
19 July 2019; 13:00	Slovakia	21–32	Sweden	Magvassy Mihály Sportcsarnok, Győr; Attendance: 100; Referees: Metalari, Nikolovski (MKD)
19 July 2019; 13:00	Pustá 5	(9–20)	Moreno 8	Magvassy Mihály Sportcsarnok, Győr; Attendance: 100; Referees: Metalari, Nikolovski (MKD)
19 July 2019; 13:00	2× (yellow card) 5× (suspension)	Report	3× (yellow card) 4× (suspension)	Magvassy Mihály Sportcsarnok, Győr; Attendance: 100; Referees: Metalari, Nikolovski (MKD)

19 July 2019; 15:30	Portugal	28–25	Slovenia	Magvassy Mihály Sportcsarnok, Győr; Referees: Pétursson, Þrastarson (ISL)
19 July 2019; 15:30	Resende, Sousa 9	(14–12)	Krese 7	Magvassy Mihály Sportcsarnok, Győr; Referees: Pétursson, Þrastarson (ISL)
19 July 2019; 15:30	1× (yellow card) 5× (suspension)	Report	1× (yellow card) 6× (suspension)	Magvassy Mihály Sportcsarnok, Győr; Referees: Pétursson, Þrastarson (ISL)

=== 9–12th place semifinals ===
19 July 2019; 18:00	Germany	22–13	Montenegro	Magvassy Mihály Sportcsarnok, Győr; Attendance: 100; Referees: Smailagic, Smailagic (SWE)
19 July 2019; 18:00	Mühlner 7	(10–4)	Trifunović 3	Magvassy Mihály Sportcsarnok, Győr; Attendance: 100; Referees: Smailagic, Smailagic (SWE)
19 July 2019; 18:00	2× (yellow card) 3× (suspension)	Report	1× (yellow card) 2× (suspension)	Magvassy Mihály Sportcsarnok, Győr; Attendance: 100; Referees: Smailagic, Smailagic (SWE)

19 July 2019
20:30
Austria
24–27 (ET)
Croatia
Magvassy Mihály Sportcsarnok, Győr
Attendance: 50
Referees: Sá, Sá (POR)
Neidhart 13
(8–11)
Ivanda 11
2× (yellow card) 4× (suspension)
Report
2× (yellow card) 6× (suspension)

FT: 21–21 ET: 3–6

=== 5–8th place semifinals ===
19 July 2019; 13:00	Denmark	27–23	Spain	Audi Aréna Győr, Győr; Attendance: 250; Referees: Geraets, Geraets (NED)
19 July 2019; 13:00	three players 4	(10–10)	Sobrepera 6	Audi Aréna Győr, Győr; Attendance: 250; Referees: Geraets, Geraets (NED)
19 July 2019; 13:00	1× (yellow card) 2× (suspension)	Report	1× (yellow card)	Audi Aréna Győr, Győr; Attendance: 250; Referees: Geraets, Geraets (NED)

19 July 2019; 15:30	Romania	37–27	France	Audi Aréna Győr, Győr; Attendance: 200; Referees: Fremstad, Pedersen (NOR)
19 July 2019; 15:30	Moroianu 7	(22–12)	Wajoka 7	Audi Aréna Győr, Győr; Attendance: 200; Referees: Fremstad, Pedersen (NOR)
19 July 2019; 15:30	1× (yellow card) 5× (suspension)	Report	1× (yellow card) 1× (suspension)	Audi Aréna Győr, Győr; Attendance: 200; Referees: Fremstad, Pedersen (NOR)

=== Semifinals ===
19 July 2019; 18:00	Hungary	29–27	Russia	Audi Aréna Győr, Győr; Attendance: 3,500; Referees: Mitrović, Kažanegra (MNE)
19 July 2019; 18:00	Kácsor 6	(19–12)	Mikhaylichenko 8	Audi Aréna Győr, Győr; Attendance: 3,500; Referees: Mitrović, Kažanegra (MNE)
19 July 2019; 18:00	2× (suspension)	Report	1× (yellow card) 3× (suspension)	Audi Aréna Győr, Győr; Attendance: 3,500; Referees: Mitrović, Kažanegra (MNE)

19 July 2019; 20:30	Netherlands	31–29	Norway	Audi Aréna Győr, Győr; Attendance: 500; Referees: Manea, Iliescu (ROU)
19 July 2019; 20:30	Nüsser, van der Vliet 8	(16–11)	three players 5	Audi Aréna Győr, Győr; Attendance: 500; Referees: Manea, Iliescu (ROU)
19 July 2019; 20:30	6× (suspension)	Report	5× (suspension)	Audi Aréna Győr, Győr; Attendance: 500; Referees: Manea, Iliescu (ROU)

=== 15th place game ===
20 July 2019; 10:00	Slovakia	23–27	Slovenia	Audi Aréna Győr, Győr; Attendance: 100; Referees: Smailagic, Smailagic (SWE)
20 July 2019; 10:00	three players 4	(15–13)	Cankar, Kolar 5	Audi Aréna Győr, Győr; Attendance: 100; Referees: Smailagic, Smailagic (SWE)
20 July 2019; 10:00	2× (yellow card) 3× (suspension)	Report	2× (yellow card) 2× (suspension)	Audi Aréna Győr, Győr; Attendance: 100; Referees: Smailagic, Smailagic (SWE)

=== 13th place game ===
20 July 2019; 12:30	Sweden	25–24	Portugal	Audi Aréna Győr, Győr; Attendance: 70; Referees: Geraets, Geraets (NED)
20 July 2019; 12:30	Fredén 7	(9–10)	Resende 9	Audi Aréna Győr, Győr; Attendance: 70; Referees: Geraets, Geraets (NED)
20 July 2019; 12:30	1× (yellow card)	Report	1× (yellow card) 3× (suspension)	Audi Aréna Győr, Győr; Attendance: 70; Referees: Geraets, Geraets (NED)

=== Eleventh place game ===
20 July 2019; 15:00	Montenegro	15–22	Austria	Audi Aréna Győr, Győr; Attendance: 100; Referees: Pétursson, Þrastarson (ISL)
20 July 2019; 15:00	Ćorović 5	(7–12)	Reichert 8	Audi Aréna Győr, Győr; Attendance: 100; Referees: Pétursson, Þrastarson (ISL)
20 July 2019; 15:00	1× (yellow card) 8× (suspension) 1× (red card)	Report	1× (yellow card) 1× (suspension)	Audi Aréna Győr, Győr; Attendance: 100; Referees: Pétursson, Þrastarson (ISL)

=== Ninth place game ===
20 July 2019; 17:30	Germany	23–22	Croatia	Audi Aréna Győr, Győr; Attendance: 150; Referees: Fremstad, Pedersen (NOR)
20 July 2019; 17:30	Bleckmann 8	(12–13)	Franušić 8	Audi Aréna Győr, Győr; Attendance: 150; Referees: Fremstad, Pedersen (NOR)
20 July 2019; 17:30	1× (yellow card) 1× (suspension)	Report	3× (yellow card) 3× (suspension)	Audi Aréna Győr, Győr; Attendance: 150; Referees: Fremstad, Pedersen (NOR)

=== Seventh place game ===
21 July 2019; 10:00	Spain	27–26	France	Audi Aréna Győr, Győr; Attendance: 50; Referees: Praštalo, Balvan (BIH)
21 July 2019; 10:00	Arcos, Loidi 5	(13–9)	Begon 6	Audi Aréna Győr, Győr; Attendance: 50; Referees: Praštalo, Balvan (BIH)
21 July 2019; 10:00	1× (yellow card) 2× (suspension)	Report	2× (suspension)	Audi Aréna Győr, Győr; Attendance: 50; Referees: Praštalo, Balvan (BIH)

=== Fifth place game ===
21 July 2019; 12:30	Denmark	26–34	Romania	Audi Aréna Győr, Győr; Attendance: 400; Referees: Metalari, Nikolovski (MKD)
21 July 2019; 12:30	Damgaard 5	(13–17)	Moraru 8	Audi Aréna Győr, Győr; Attendance: 400; Referees: Metalari, Nikolovski (MKD)
21 July 2019; 12:30	3× (suspension)	Report	2× (yellow card) 1× (suspension)	Audi Aréna Győr, Győr; Attendance: 400; Referees: Metalari, Nikolovski (MKD)

=== Third place game ===
21 July 2019; 15:00	Norway	29–26	Russia	Audi Aréna Győr, Győr; Attendance: 2,000; Referees: Sá, Sá (POR)
21 July 2019; 15:00	Alver 7	(19–13)	Kirdiasheva 9	Audi Aréna Győr, Győr; Attendance: 2,000; Referees: Sá, Sá (POR)
21 July 2019; 15:00	1× (yellow card) 3× (suspension)	Report	1× (yellow card) 4× (suspension)	Audi Aréna Győr, Győr; Attendance: 2,000; Referees: Sá, Sá (POR)

=== Final ===
21 July 2019; 17:30	Netherlands	20–27	Hungary	Audi Aréna Győr, Győr; Attendance: 5,400; Referees: Boričić, Marković (SRB)
21 July 2019; 17:30	three players 4	(7–14)	four players 4	Audi Aréna Győr, Győr; Attendance: 5,400; Referees: Boričić, Marković (SRB)
21 July 2019; 17:30	1× (yellow card) 3× (suspension)	Report	2× (yellow card) 2× (suspension)	Audi Aréna Győr, Győr; Attendance: 5,400; Referees: Boričić, Marković (SRB)

== Final ranking ==
Rank	Team
1st place, gold medalist(s)	Hungary
2nd place, silver medalist(s)	Netherlands
3rd place, bronze medalist(s)	Norway
4	Russia
5	Romania
6	Denmark
7	Spain
8	France
9	Germany
10	Croatia
11	Austria
12	Montenegro
13	Sweden
14	Portugal
15	Slovenia
16	Slovakia

Team qualified to the 2020 Women's Junior World Handball Championship

== Tournament awards ==
The all-star team and awards were announced on 21 July 2019.

=== All-star team ===
Position	Player
Goalkeeper	(Russia) Anna Vereshchak
Right wing	(Romania) Andra Moroianu
Right back	(Russia) Valeriia Maslova
Centre back	(Netherlands) Larissa Nüsser
Left back	(Hungary) Gréta Kácsor
Left wing	(Netherlands) Zoë Sprengers
Pivot	(Norway) Ane Høgseth

=== Awards ===
Best defense player	(Hungary) Csenge Kuczora
Most valuable player	(Russia) Elena Mikhaylichenko
Top scorer	(Portugal) Joana Resende

== Statistics ==
=== Top goalscorers ===
Rank	Name	Team	Goals
1	Joana Resende	Portugal	55
2	Dana Bleckmann	Germany	49
2	Valeriia Maslova	Russia	49
2	Beatriz Sousa	Portugal	49
5	Ema Guskić	Croatia	46
6	Elena Mikhaylichenko	Russia	45
7	Nina Neidhart	Austria	43
8	Lea Franušić	Croatia	39
9	Johanna Reichert	Austria	38
10	Christine Karlsen Alver	Norway	37
10	Zoë Sprengers	Netherlands	37
