= Nikolina Knežević =

Nikolina Knežević may refer to:

- Nikolina Knežević (handballer)
- Nikolina Knežević (basketball)
