= Marie Rokkones Hansen =

Norwegian handball player (born 2000)

Personal information
- Full name: Marie Kristine Rokkones Hansen
- Nationality: Norwegian
- Born: 4 October 2000 (age 26) Trondheim, Norway
- Height: 1.80 m (5 ft 11 in)

Sport
- Sport: Handball
- Position: Right back
- Current club: Tertnes HE
- Number: 26

Senior clubs
- Years: Team
- 2018–2024: Byåsen HE
- 2024–: Tertnes HE
Medal record
Junior European Championship
Bronze medal – third place	2019 Hungary

Marie Rokkones Hansen (born 4 October 2000) is a Norwegian handball player who plays for Tertnes HE.

She also represented Norway in the 2019 Women's U-19 European Handball Championship, where she received bronze.

== Achievements ==
- European Women's U-19 Handball Championship:
  - Third place: 2019
