= SCM Gloria Buzău (women's handball) =

Romanian handball club

- Full name: Sport Club Municipal Gloria Buzău
- Short name: Gloria Buzău
- Founded: August 3, 2017; 8 years ago
- Dissolved: January 9, 2025; 14 months ago
- Arena: Romeo Iamandi
- Capacity: 1,800
- President: Cristian Ceaușel
- League: Liga Națională
- 2023–24: Liga Națională, 7th of 14
- Club colours
Home	Away

SCM Gloria Buzău was a women's handball club from Buzău, Romania, that competed in the Liga Națională and the European League (formerly known as EHF Cup).

== Kits ==
HOME

2019–20

AWAY
2017–18	2019–20	2020-

== Players ==
=== Transfers ===
Transfers for the 2025-2026 season

Leaving

- (Romania) Daria Bucur (RB) (to (Romania) Gloria Bistrița)
- (Romania) Ana Măzăreanu (GK) (to (Romania) Gloria Bistrița)
- (Romania) Mădălina Zamfirescu (CB) (to (Romania) CSJ Prahova)
- (Romania) Mădălina Ion (GK)
- (Croatia) Tea Pijević (GK)
- (Romania) Marina Ilie (LW)
- (Romania) Raluca Nicolae (LW) (to (Romania) CSM Târgu Jiu)
- (Turkey) Beyza Irem Türkoglu (LW)
- (Romania) Alexandra Badea (RW)
- (Romania) Andra Moroianu (RW) (to (Romania) CSJ Prahova)
- (Romania) Andreea Coman (RW) (to (Romania) CSJ Prahova)
- (Romania) Ștefania Jipa (LP) (to (Romania) CSM Iasi)
- (Norway) Sherin Obaildi (LP) (to (Sweden) Skövde HF)
- (France) Sabrina Abdellahi (LP) (to (France) Saint-Amand Handball
- (Romania) Oana Andrei (LB)
- (Belarus) Dziyana Ilyina (LB) (to (Romania) CSM Iasi)
- (Poland) Aleksandra Zimny (LB) (to (Romania) CSJ Prahova)
- (Norway) Christine Karlsen Alver (CB) (to (Norway) Fana)
- (Hungary) Tamara Pál (CB) (to (Romania) CSM Slatina)
- (Hungary) Nikoletta Papp (RB) (to (Romania) Minaur Baia Mare)
