= Ana Măzăreanu =

Romanian handball player (born 1993)

Personal information
- Full name: Ana Maria Măzăreanu
- Nationality: Romanian
- Born: 4 February 1993 (age 33) Iași, Romania
- Height: 1.80 m (5 ft 11 in)

Sport
- Sport: Handball
- Position: Goalkeeper
- Current club: CS Gloria Bistrița-Năsăud (handball)
- Number: 1

Senior clubs
- Years: Team
- –2016: Universitatea Cluj-Napoca
- 2016–2019: Gloria Bistrița
- 2019–2020: Minaur Baia Mare
- 2020–2022: Gloria Bistrița
- 2022–2023: CS Măgura Cisnădie (handball)
- 2023–2025: SCM Gloria Buzău (women's handball)
- 2025-: CS Gloria Bistrița-Năsăud (handball)
National team
Years	Team	Apps	(Gls)
2017–	Romania	13	(0)

Ana Maria Măzăreanu (born 4 February 1993) is a Romanian handball player who plays as a goalkeeper for the Gloria Bistrița and the Romanian national team.

She represented Romania at the 2020 European Women's Handball Championship.

== Achievements ==
- Cupa României :
  - Bronze Medalist: 2017
