= Ștefania Jipa =

Romanian handball player (born 2000)

Personal information
- Full name: Ștefania Oana Jipa
- Nationality: Romanian
- Born: 1 March 2000 (age 26) Onești, Romania
- Height: 1.78 m (5 ft 10 in)

Sport
- Sport: Handball
- Position: Pivot
- Current club: SCM Craiova
- Number: 35

Youth career
- Years: Team
- –2019: CSM București

Senior clubs
- Years: Team
- 2019–2021: CSM București
- 2021-2024: SCM Craiova
- 2024-: SCM Gloria Buzău
- Updated on 27 September 2019

Ștefania Oana Jipa (born 1 March 2000) is a Romanian handball player for SCM Craiova.

As a junior, she finished fifth in the 2019 Junior European Championship.
