= Daria Bucur =

Romanian handball player (born 1999)

Personal information
- Nationality: Romanian
- Born: 11 July 1999 (age 27) Constanța, Romania
- Height: 1.80 m (5 ft 11 in)

Sport
- Sport: Handball
- Position: Right back
- Current club: CS Gloria Bistrița-Năsăud (handball)
- Number: 18

Youth career
- Years: Team
- –2014: CSȘ 1 Constanța
- 2014–2017: Corona Brașov II

Senior clubs
- Years: Team
- 2017–2020: Corona Brașov
- 2020–2023: SCM Râmnicu Vâlcea
- 2023–2025: SCM Gloria Buzău
- 2025-: CS Gloria Bistrița-Năsăud (handball)
National team
- Years: Team
- 2017–: Romania

Daria Bucur (born 11 July 1999) is a Romanian female handball player who plays for SCM Gloria Buzău and the Romanian national team.

== International honours ==
- Youth European Championship:
  - Fourth place: 2015
