= Romeo Iamandi Sports Hall =

Sports hall in Buzău, Romania

Sala Sporturilor Romeo Iamandi
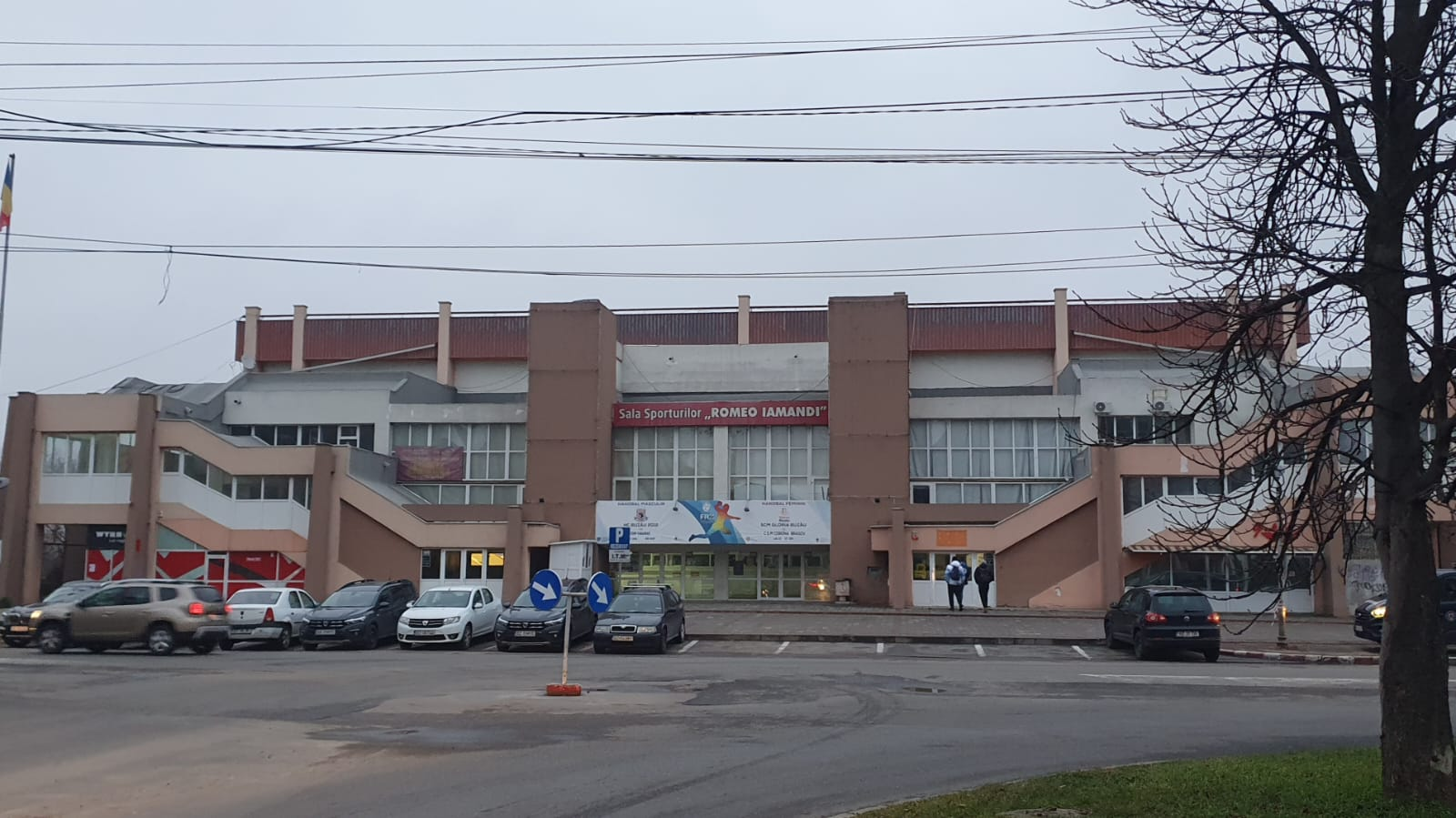
- View of venue (2024)
- Interactive map of Sala Sporturilor Romeo Iamandi
- Full name: Sala Sporturilor Romeo Iamandi
- Former names: Sala Sporturilor
- Location: Buzău, Romania
- Coordinates: 45°09′33.3″N 26°49′48″E
- Owner: Municipality of Buzău
- Operator: HC Buzău; Gloria Buzău
- Capacity: 1,800 (handball)
- Surface: Maple wood

Construction
- Opened: 1982
- Renovated: 2010–2011

Tenants
- HC Buzău; Gloria Buzău

Romeo Iamandi Sports Hall is an indoor arena located in Buzău, Romania. The arena is named after the Romanian handball player and referee Romeo Iamandi. It is the home arena of the men's professional handball club HC Buzău and women's professional handball team Gloria Buzău. It was opened in 1982, renovated several times and has a capacity of 1,800 seats.

== Gallery ==
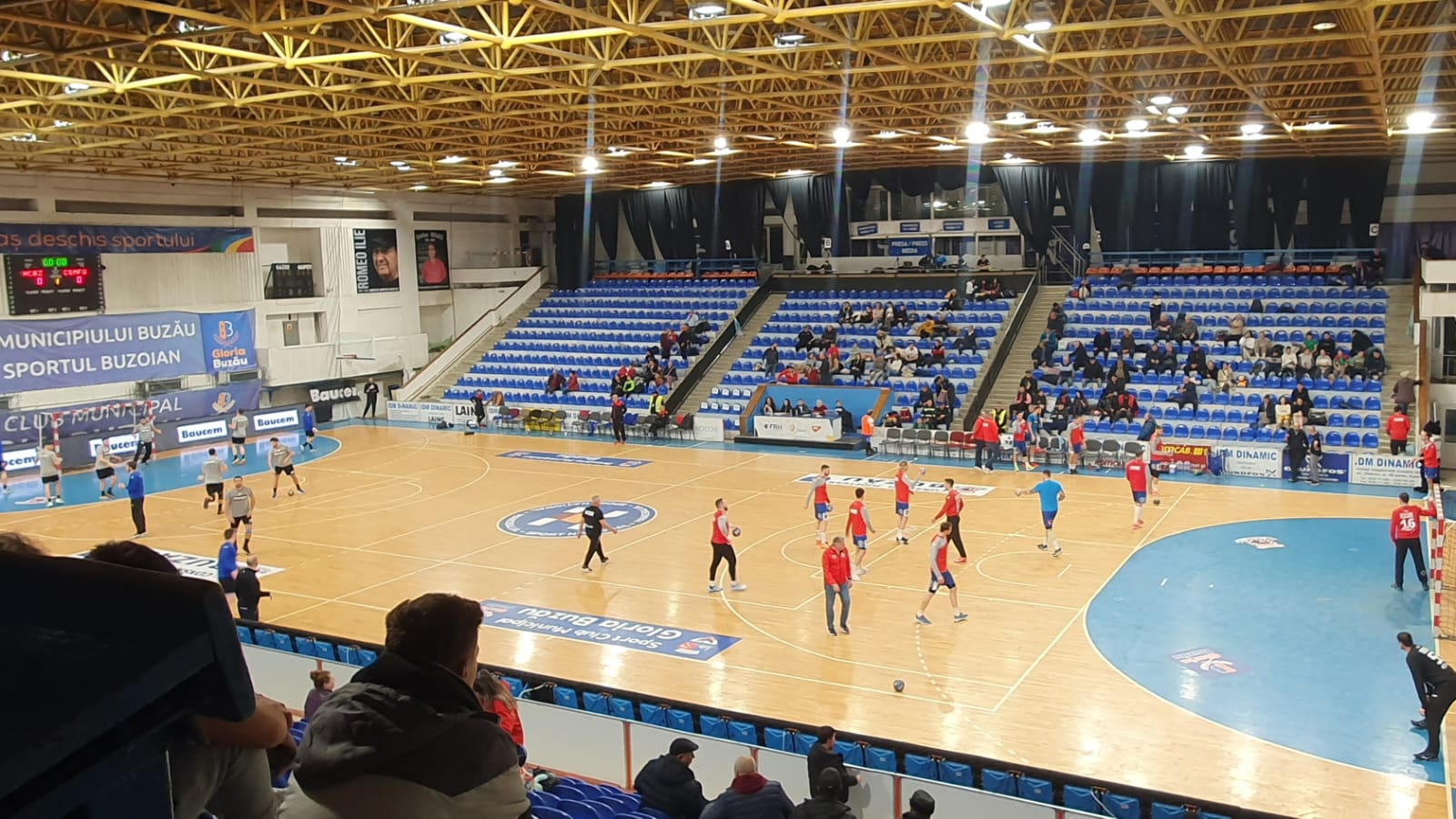
Inside View of the Sports Hall
