= Sarah Dekker =

Dutch handball player (born 2001)

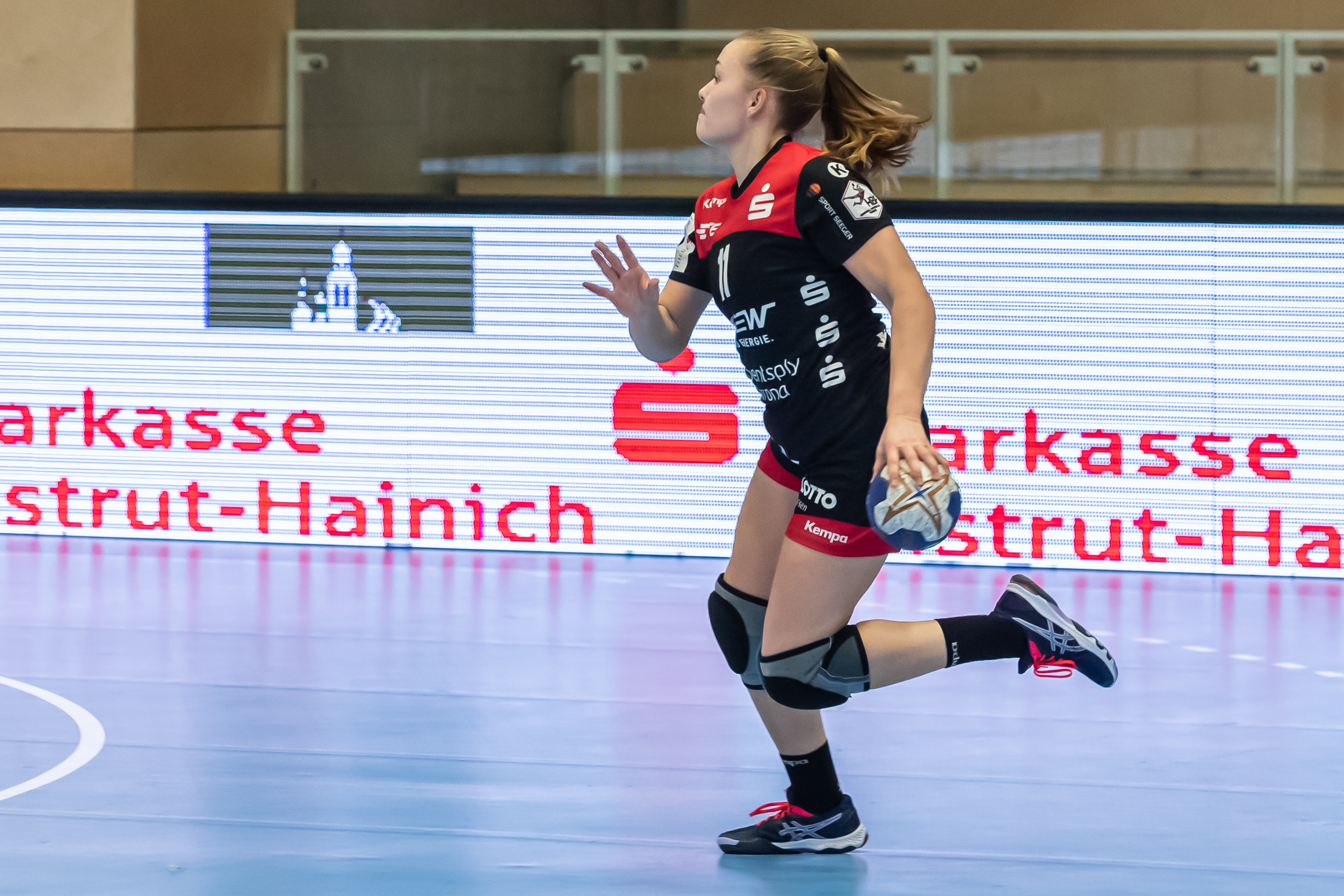

Personal information
- Full name: Sarah Johanna Dekker
- Nationality: Dutch
- Born: 8 March 2001 (age 25) De Goorn, Netherlands
- Height: 1.73 m (5 ft 8 in)

Sport
- Sport: Handball
- Position: Right wing
- Current club: Team Esbjerg
- Number: 11

Senior clubs
- Years: Team
- 2017–2019: Westfriesland SEW
- 2019–12/2024: HSG Bensheim/Auerbach
- 01/2025–2026: Team Esbjerg
- 2026–: SCM Râmnicu Vâlcea
National team
Years	Team	Apps	(Gls)
2018–	Netherlands	13	(22)
Medal record
Junior European Championship
Silver medal – second place	2019 Hungary

Sarah Dekker (born 8 March 2001) is a Dutch female handball player who plays for Team Esbjerg

She also represented Netherlands in the 2019 Women's U-19 European Handball Championship, where she received silver.

== Achievements ==
- Junior European Championship:
  - Silver Medalist: 2019
- EHF Champions League
  - Bronze Medalist: 2024-25
- Danish League:
  - Winner: 2026
  - Silver Medalist: 2025
