= Zoë Sprengers =

Dutch handball player (born 2000)

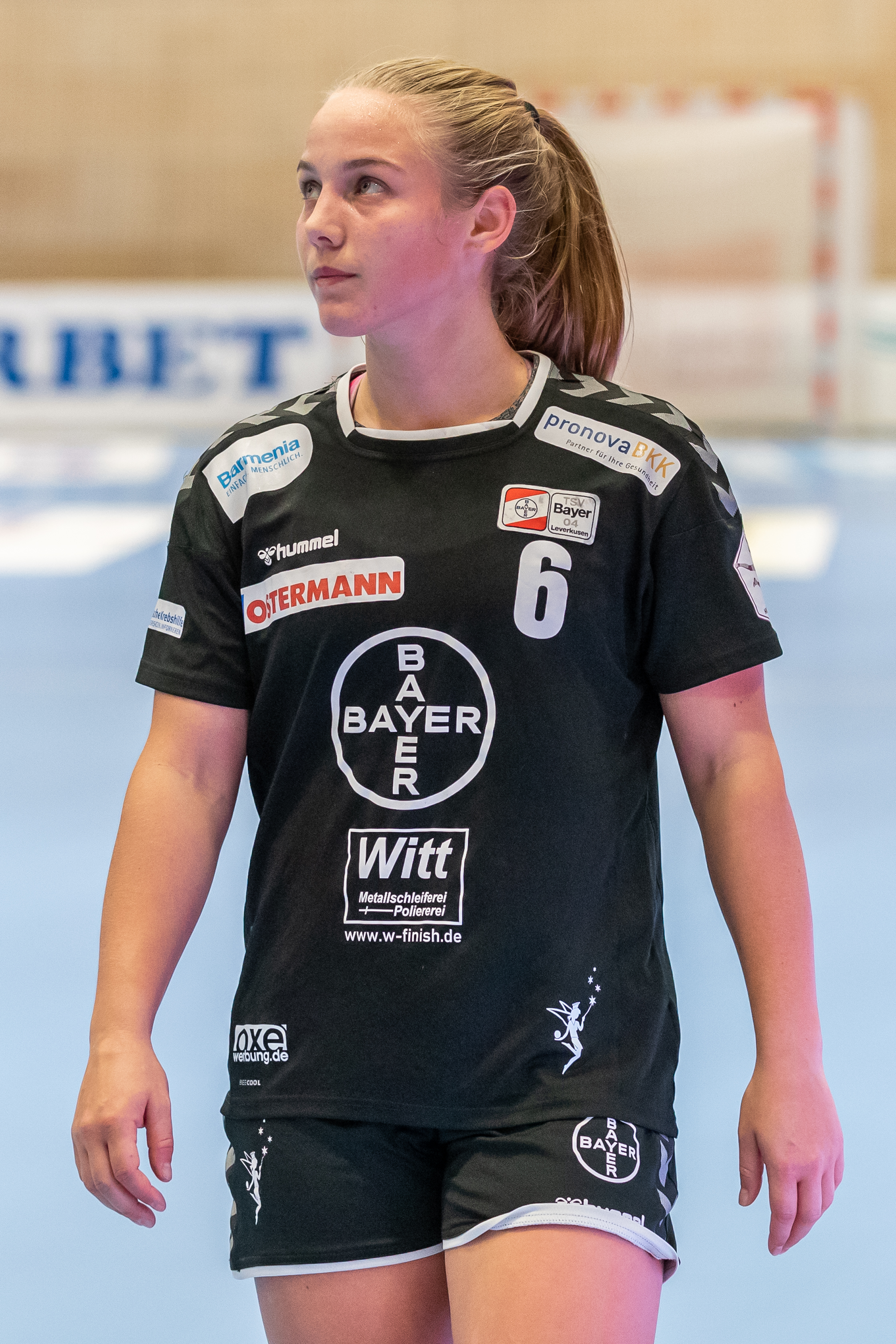
- Sprengers in 2020

Personal information
- Nationality: Dutch
- Born: 19 January 2000 (age 26) Haarlem, Netherlands

Sport
- Sport: Handball
- Position: Left Wing
- Current club: SCM Râmnicu Vâlcea
- Number: 6

Senior clubs
- Years: Team
- 2017–2020: VOC Amsterdam
- 2020–2022: Bayer Leverkusen
- 2022–2024: Borussia Dortmund
- 2024–2025: Nykøbing Falster Håndboldklub
- 2025–2026: Team Esbjerg
- 2026–: SCM Râmnicu Vâlcea
National team
Years	Team	Apps	(Gls)
2021–	Netherlands	82	(176)
Medal record
Junior European Championship
Silver medal – second place	2019 Hungary
- Updated on 14 December 2025

Zoë Sprengers (born 19 January 2000) is a Dutch handballer who plays as left wing for SCM Râmnicu Vâlcea and the Dutch National Women's team.

== Achievements ==
- Junior European Championship
  - Silver: 2019
- European Youth Beach Handball Championship
  - Gold: 2016
- Eredivisie
  - Gold: 2017, 2018, 2019
- Danish Championship:
  - Winner: 2026

== Awards and recognition ==
- EHF Youth European Championship Top Scorer: 2017
- All-Star Team Best Left Wing of the Junior European Championship: 2019
