= Andra Moroianu =

Romanian handball player (born 2000)

Personal information
- Full name: Andra Liviana Moroianu
- Nationality: Romanian
- Born: 15 September 2000 (age 26) Constanța, Romania
- Height: 1.72 m (5 ft 8 in)

Sport
- Sport: Handball
- Position: Right wing
- Current club: SCM Gloria Buzău (women's handball)
- Number: 79

Senior clubs
- Years: Team
- 2018–2019: Universitatea Cluj-Napoca
- 2019–2021: Gloria Bistrița
- 2021–: SCM Gloria Buzău (women's handball)
- Updated on 27 September 2019

Andra Liviana Moroianu (born 15 September 2000) is a Romanian handball player for SCM Gloria Buzău (women's handball).

As a junior, she finished fifth in the 2019 Junior European Championship.

== Individual awards ==
- All-Star Right Wing of the Junior European Championship: 2019
- Romanian SuperCup 2020-2021
