= Andreea Popa =

Romanian handball player (born 2000)

Personal information
- Full name: Andreea Cristina Popa
- Nationality: Romanian
- Born: 3 June 2000 (age 26) Bucharest, Romania
- Height: 1.77 m (5 ft 10 in)

Sport
- Sport: Handball
- Position: Centre back
- Current club: HC Dunărea Brăila
- Number: 70

Youth career
- Years: Team
- –2016: CSȘ 2 București

Senior clubs
- Years: Team
- 2016–2017: Dinamo București
- 2017–2019: Rapid București
- 2019–2023: Minaur Baia Mare
- 2023–: HC Dunărea Brăila
National team
Years	Team	Apps	(Gls)
2019–	Romania	27	(49)
- Updated on 7 November 2025

Andreea Cristina Popa (born 3 June 2000) is a Romanian handballer for HC Dunărea Brăila and the Romanian national team.

She represented Romania at the 2020 European Women's Handball Championship.

As a junior, she finished fifth in the 2019 Junior European Championship.

== International honours ==
- Youth Mediterranean Games:
  - Gold Medalist: 2017
- Youth European Olympic Festival:
  - Silver Medalist: 2017

== Individual awards ==
- All-Star Left Back of the Youth Mediterranean Games: 2017

== Personal life ==
Popa's parents are both physical education teachers. She started playing handball under the coaching guidance of her mother Dorina Popa.
