= Nikoleta Trúnková =

Slovak handball player (born 1998)

Personal information
- Nationality: Slovak
- Born: 23 August 1998 (age 28) Bánovce nad Bebravou, Slovakia
- Height: 1.80 m (5 ft 11 in)

Sport
- Sport: Handball
- Position: Line player
- Current club: Kisvárdai KC
- Number: 13

Senior clubs
- Years: Team
- 2018–2022: IUVENTA Michalovce
- 2022–2023: Kisvárdai KC
National team
Years	Team	Apps	(Gls)
2019–	Slovakia	21	(36)

Nikoleta Trúnková (born 23 August 1998) is a Slovak female handball player for Kisvárdai KC and the Slovak national team.

She represented Slovakia at the 2021 World Women's Handball Championship in Spain.
