= Csenge Kuczora =

Hungarian handballer (born 2000)

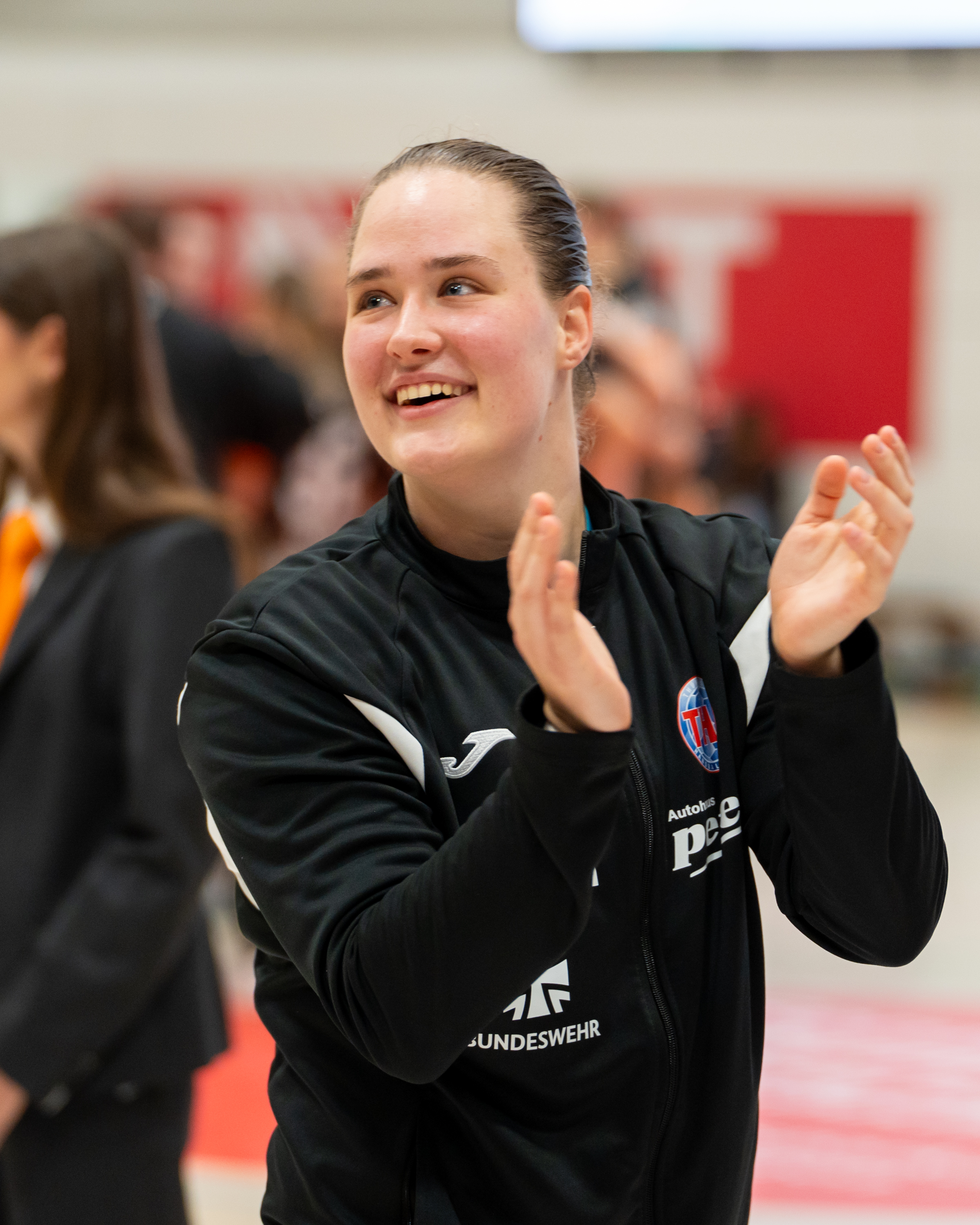

Personal information
- Full name: Csenge Kuczora
- Nationality: Hungarian
- Born: 26 January 2000 (age 26) Budapest, Hungary
- Height: 1.76 m (5 ft 9 in)

Sport
- Sport: Handball
- Position: Left back/Centre back
- Current club: CSM București

Youth career
- Years: Team
- 2006–2016: Vasas SC

Senior clubs
- Years: Team
- 2016–2018: Vasas SC
- 2018–2024: Váci NKSE
- 2024–2026: Thüringer HC
- 2026–: CSM București
National team
Years	Team	Apps	(Gls)
2022–	Hungary	74	(244)
Medal record
European Women's Handball Championship
Bronze medal – third place	2024 Austria/Hungary/Switzerland
Junior European Championship
Gold medal – first place	2019 Hungary
EYOF
Gold medal – first place	2017 Győr
Youth World Championship
Silver medal – second place	2018 Poland
Youth European Championship
Bronze medal – third place	2017 Slovakia
- Updated on 10 December 2025

Csenge Kuczora (born 26 January 2000) is a Hungarian handballer for CSM București and the Hungarian national team.

At the 2024 European Championship she was part of the Hungarian team that won bronze medals, losing to Norway in semifinal and beating France in the third place play-off. This was the first Hungarian medals since 2012.

== Achievements ==
National team

- European Women's Handball Championship:
  - Bronze: 2024
- Junior European Championship:
  - Gold: 2019
- European Youth Olympic Festival:
  - Gold: 2017
- IHF Youth World Championship:
  - Silver: 2018
- Youth European Championship:
  - Bronze: 2017

== Awards and recognition ==
- All-Star Team Best Defender of the Junior European Championship: 2019
- Top Scorer of the Nemzeti Bajnokság I: 2022, 2023
