= Portugal women's national handball team =

Portugal

Information
- Association: Portuguese Handball Federation
- Coach: José António Silva
- Assistant coach: Serafim Loureiro

Colours
| 1st | 2nd |

Results

European Championship
- Appearances: 2 (First in 2008)
- Best result: 16th 2008
- Last updated on Unknown.

The Portugal women's national handball team is the national team of Portugal. It is governed by the Portuguese Handball Federation and takes part in international team handball competitions.

== Results ==
=== European Championship ===
| Year | Round | Position | GP | W | D | L | GS | GA |
|---|---|---|---|---|---|---|---|---|
| (Germany) 1994 | Did not qualify | | | | | | | |
| (Denmark) 1996 | Did not qualify | | | | | | | |
| (Netherlands) 1998 | Did not qualify | | | | | | | |
| (Romania) 2000 | Did not qualify | | | | | | | |
| (Denmark) 2002 | Did not qualify | | | | | | | |
| (Hungary) 2004 | Did not qualify | | | | | | | |
| (Sweden) 2006 | Did not qualify | | | | | | | |
| (North Macedonia) 2008 | Preliminary round | 16th place | 3 | 0 | 0 | 3 | 67 | 101 |
| (Denmark) (Norway) 2010 | Did not qualify | | | | | | | |
| (Serbia) 2012 | Did not qualify | | | | | | | |
| (Hungary) (Croatia) 2014 | Did not qualify | | | | | | | |
| (Sweden) 2016 | Did not qualify | | | | | | | |
| (France) 2018 | Did not qualify | | | | | | | |
| (Denmark) (Norway) 2020 | Did not qualify | | | | | | | |
| (Slovenia) (North Macedonia) (Montenegro) 2022 | Did not qualify | | | | | | | |
| (Austria) (Hungary) (Switzerland) 2024 | Preliminary round | 22nd place | 3 | 0 | 0 | 3 | 61 | 80 |
| (Czech Republic) (Poland) (Romania) (Slovakia) (Turkey) 2026 | TBD | | | | | | | |
| (Denmark) (Norway) (Sweden) 2028 | TBD | | | | | | | |
| (Belgium) (France) 2030 | TBD | | | | | | | |
| (Denmark) (Germany) (Poland) 2032 | TBD | | | | | | | |
| Total | 2/20 | – | 3 | 0 | 0 | 6 | 128 | 181 |

== Team ==
=== Current squad ===
The official squad for the 2024 European Women's Handball Championship.

Head coach: José António Silva

| No. | Pos. | Name | Date of birth (age) | Height | App. | Goals | Club |
|---|---|---|---|---|---|---|---|
| 1 | GK | Isabel Góis | 10 October 1995 (age 30) | 1.82 m | 89 | 0 | (Portugal) Madeira Andebol SAD |
| 2 | LB | Mariana Lopes | 4 December 1994 (age 31) | 1.73 m | 70 | 242 | (Hungary) Békéscsabai Előre NKSE |
| 6 | LW | Carolina Monteiro Nunes | 8 October 1998 (age 27) | 1.69 m | 36 | 59 | (Portugal) ADA de Sao Pedro do Sul |
| 7 | P | Bebiana Rodrigues Sabino | 15 November 1986 (age 39) | 1.74 m | 145 | 241 | (Portugal) Colégio de Gaia |
| 8 | CB | Constança Sequeira | 17 February 2004 (age 22) | 1.72 m | 10 | 15 | (Portugal) S.L. Benfica |
| 9 | LB | Ana Carolina Policarpo Silva | 19 September 1997 (age 28) | 1.75 m | 33 | 10 | (Spain) Motive.co Gijon |
| 10 | GK | Jéssica Ferreira | 11 October 1996 (age 29) | 1.80 m | 63 | 2 | (Hungary) Békéscsabai Előre NKSE |
| 18 | GK | Matilde Costa Rosa | 8 July 2005 (age 20) | 1.74 m | 12 | 0 | (Portugal) S.L. Benfica |
| 19 | CB | Patrícia da Silva Lima | 3 March 1995 (age 31) | 1.78 m | 55 | 90 | (Spain) CBF Málaga Costa del Sol |
| 22 | O | Nádia Rodrigues | 28 March 2001 (age 25) | 1.73 m | 15 | 22 | (Portugal) S.L. Benfica |
| 23 | RW | Patrícia Rodrigues | 7 November 1996 (age 29) | 1.87 m | 56 | 203 | (Portugal) S.L. Benfica |
| 25 | RB | Luciana Rebelo | 25 July 2005 (age 20) | 1.70 m | 17 | 26 | (Denmark) Team Esbjerg |
| 27 | RB | Beatriz Sousa | 27 September 2001 (age 24) | 1.76 m | 33 | 103 | (France) Toulon Métropole Var Handball |
| 36 | LW | Marianna Ferraz Costa | 29 August 2003 (age 22) | 1.76 m | 9 | 18 | (Portugal) S.L. Benfica |
| 73 | LB | Joana Resende | 23 March 2001 (age 25) | 1.60 m | 28 | 67 | (Spain) CBF Málaga Costa del Sol |
| 88 | RW | Neide Duarte | 16 February 2000 (age 26) | 1.77 m | 20 | 27 | (Portugal) Madeira Andebol SAD |
| 99 | LB | Maria João Gomes Unjanque | 11 February 2003 (age 23) | 1.74 m | 17 | 51 | (Portugal) S.L. Benfica |
