= Paula Arcos =

Spanish handball player (born 2001)

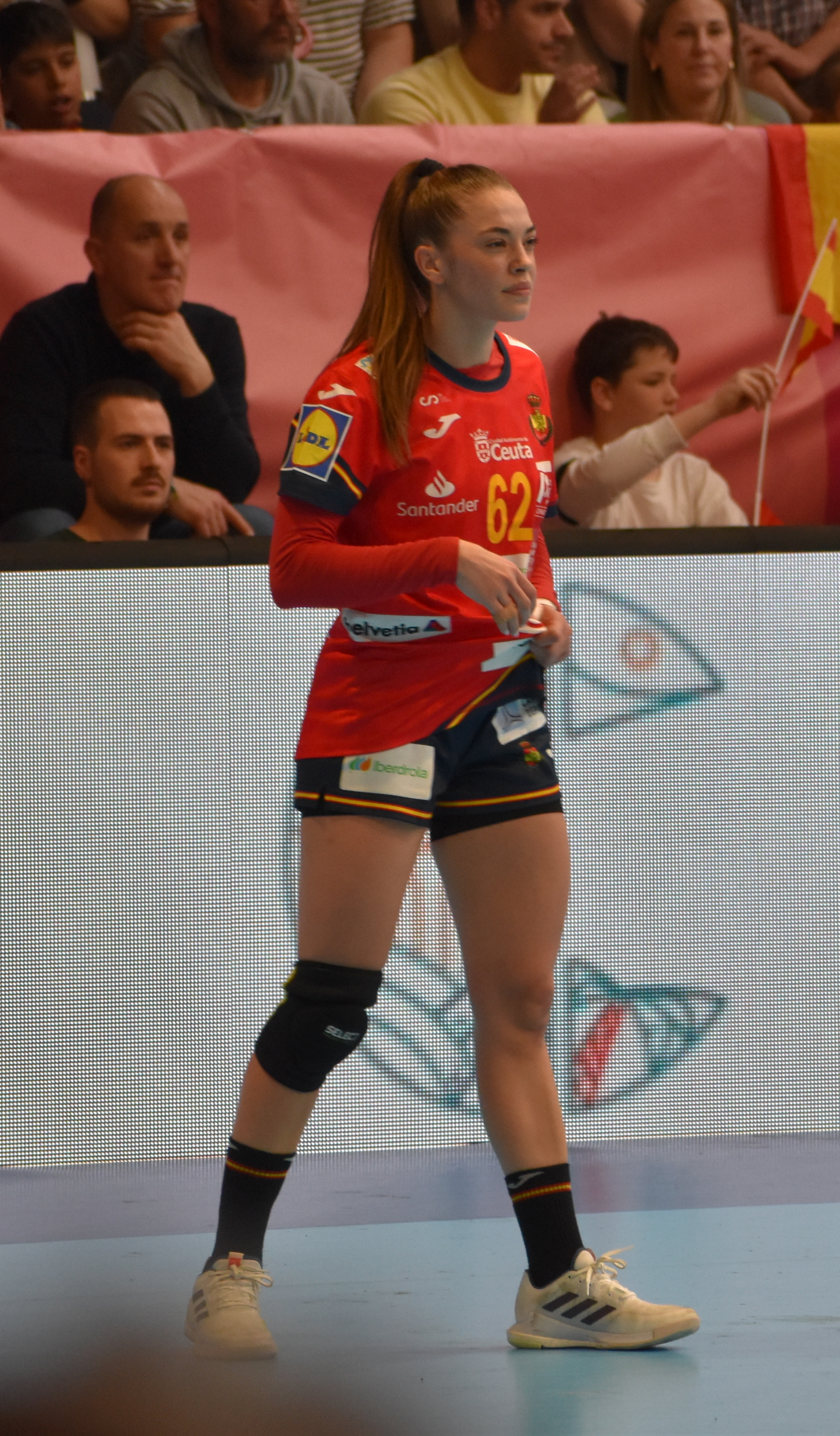

Personal information
- Full name: Paula Arcos Poveda
- Nationality: Spanish
- Born: 21 December 2001 (age 24) Petrer, Spain
- Height: 1.68 m (5 ft 6 in)

Sport
- Sport: Handball
- Position: Left back
- Current club: Gloria Bistrița
- Number: 23

Senior clubs
- Years: Team
- 2017–2022: CB Atlético Guardés
- 2022–2023: BM Bera Bera
- 2023–01/2025: Vipers Kristiansand
- 01/2025–: Gloria Bistrița
National team
Years	Team	Apps	(Gls)
2020–	Spain	69	(163)
- Updated on 13 January 2025

Paula Arcos Poveda (Note: In this Spanish name, the first or paternal surname is Arcos and the second or maternal family name is Poveda.) (born 21 December 2001) is a Spanish professional handball player who is currently playing at CS Gloria 2018 Bistrița-Năsăud after having played for Norwegian side Vipers Kristiansand until they went bankrupt in 2025. She also features in the Spanish national team. She made her Olympic debut representing Spain at the 2020 Summer Olympics.

She was included in the Spanish squad in the women's handball competition for the 2020 Summer Olympics.

== Achievements ==
- Norwegian League:
  - Winner: 2023/2024
- Norwegian Cup:
  - Winner: 2023/24
