= Joana Resende =

Portuguese handball player (born 2001)

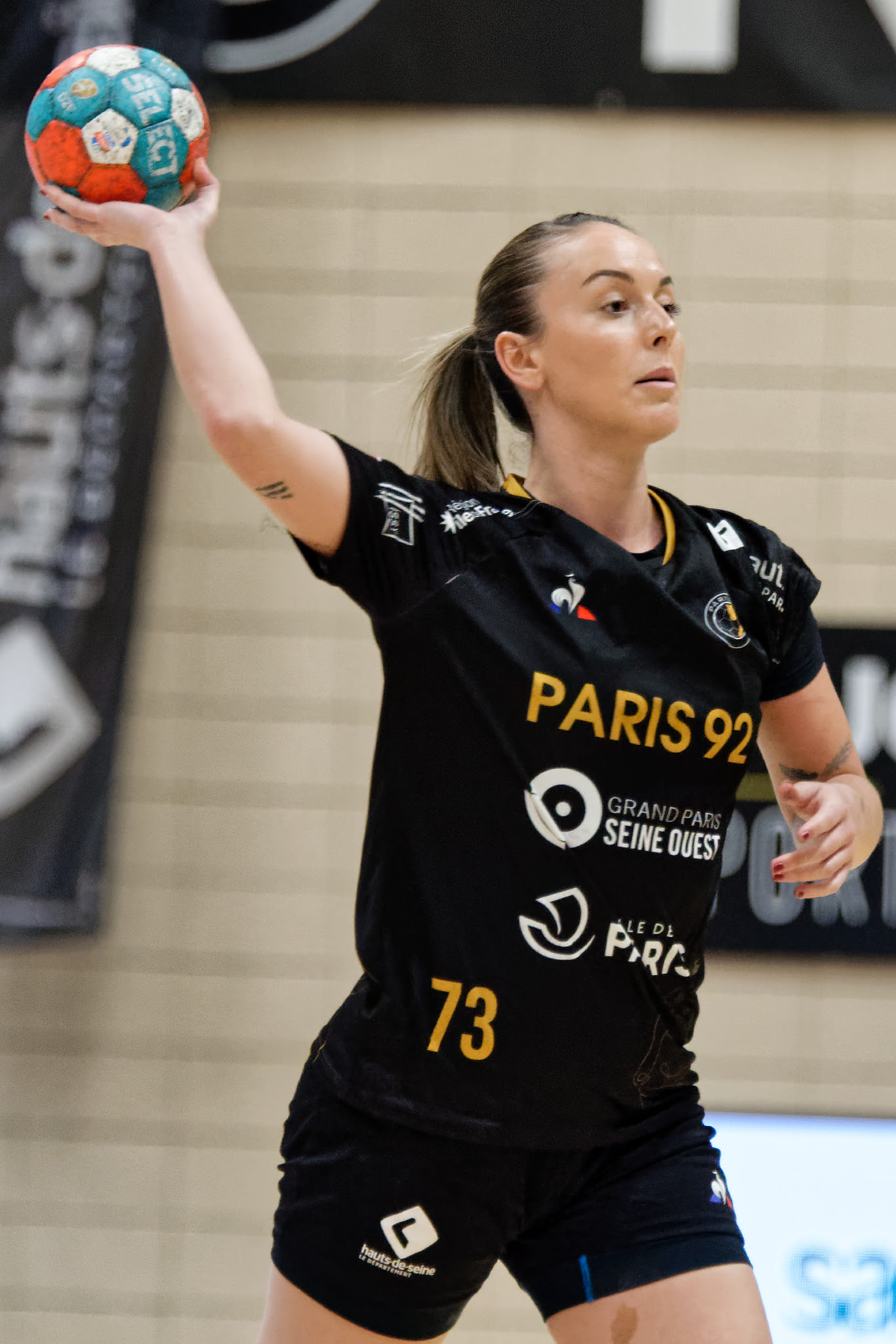
- Joana Resende (2022)

Personal information
- Nationality: Portuguese
- Born: 23 March 2001 (age 25) Porto, Portugal
- Height: 1.75 m (5 ft 9 in)

Sport
- Sport: Handball
- Position: Left back
- Current club: Paris 92
- Number: 73

Senior clubs
- Years: Team
- 2017–2018: Colégio de Gaia
- 2018–2020: Benfica
- 2020–2022: Paris 92
National team
Years	Team	Apps	(Gls)
2018-	Portugal	29	(75)
- Updated on 30 November 2024

Joana Resende (born 23 March 2001) is a Portuguese handball player for Paris 92 and the Portuguese national team.

She represented Portugal in the 2018 Women's Junior World Handball Championship, placing 18th and in the 2019 Women's U-19 European Handball Championship, placing 14th. She was also top scorer for Portugal and the overall topscorer at the 2019 Women's U-19 European Handball Championship, with 55 goals.

She made her international debut on the Portuguese national team on 25 November 2018, against Greece.

She is the daughter of former Portuguese top handball player, Carlos Resende.

== Individual awards ==
- Topscorer of the Junior European Championship: 2019
