= Bebiana Rodrigues Sabino =

Portuguese handball player (born 1986)

Bebiana Sabino
Personal information
- Full name: Bebiana Catarina Rodrigues Sabino
- Nationality: Portuguese
- Born: 15 November 1986 (age 39) Porto, Portugal
- Height: 1.73 m (5 ft 8 in)

Sport
- Sport: Handball
- Position: Line player
- Current club: Colégio de Gaia
- Number: 2

Senior clubs
- Years: Team
- 2002–2006: Colégio de Gaia
- 2006–2013: Madeira Andebol SAD
- 2013–: Colégio de Gaia
National team
Years	Team	Apps	(Gls)
2006–	Portugal	145	(241)

Bebiana Catarina Rodrigues Sabino (born 15 November 1986) is a Portuguese handball player for Colégio de Gaia and the Portuguese national team.

She represented Portugal at the 2024 European Women's Handball Championship.
