= Nikolina Knežević (handballer) =

Montenegrin handball player (born 2000)

Personal information
- Nationality: Montenegrin
- Born: 2 July 2000 (age 26) Podgorica, Montenegro
- Height: 1.83 m (6 ft 0 in)

Sport
- Sport: Handball
- Position: Centre back
- Current club: CSU Danubius Galați
- Number: 20

Senior clubs
- Years: Team
- 2017–2020: ŽRK Budućnost Podgorica
- 2020-: CSU Danubius Galați
National team
Years	Team	Apps	(Gls)
2018–	Montenegro	5	(2)
Medal record
Mediterranean Games
Silver medal – second place	2018 Tarragona	Team

Nikolina Knežević (born 2 July 2000) is a Montenegrin handball player for CSU Danubius Galați and the Montenegrin national team.

She represented Montenegro at the 2019 World Women's Handball Championship.
