= Beatriz Sousa =

Portuguese handball player (born 2001)

Personal information
- Full name: Beatriz Fabiana Sousa
- Nationality: Portuguese
- Born: 27 September 2001 (age 25) Madeira, Portugal
- Height: 1.70 m (5 ft 7 in)

Sport
- Sport: Handball
- Position: Right back
- Current club: Toulon Métropole Var Handball
- Number: 7
National team
Years	Team	Apps	(Gls)
2021–	Portugal	33	(102)

Beatriz Fabiana Sousa (born 27 September 2001) is a Portuguese handball player for Toulon Métropole Var Handball and the Portuguese national team.

She represented Portugal at the 2024 European Women's Handball Championship.
