= 2014 European Women's Handball Championship qualification =

This article describes the qualification for the 2014 European Women's Handball Championship.

== Qualification system ==
=== Draw and format ===
The draw was held at the Veszprém Aréna in Veszprém, Hungary on 26 May 2013 at 17:00 local time. Hungary and Croatia as host nations were directly qualified. 26 teams had registered for participation and compete for 14 places at the final tournament in the qualification. The teams were divided into several pots according to their positions in the EHF National Team Ranking.

The two top ranked teams advanced to the final tournament.

=== Seeding ===
Pot 1	Pot 2	Pot 3	Pot 4
Norway; Denmark; Montenegro; France; Sweden; Russia; Spain	Romania; Serbia; Germany; Iceland; Netherlands; Ukraine; Czech Republic	Macedonia; Turkey; Slovenia; Poland; Austria; Belarus; Slovakia	Switzerland; Portugal; Italy; Lithuania; Finland

== Groups ==
=== Group 1 ===
Pos	Team	Pld	W	D	L	GF	GA	GD	Pts	Qualification
1	Denmark	6	6	0	0	204	164	+40	12	Final tournament
2	Ukraine	6	3	0	3	177	166	+11	6	Final tournament
3	Austria	6	3	0	3	177	186	−9	6	
4	Lithuania	6	0	0	6	160	202	−42	0	

24 October 2013; 18:00	Ukraine	30 – 27	Lithuania	Palace of Sports Yunost, Zaporizhia; Attendance: 1,400; Referees: Aghakishi, Aghakishi (AZE)
24 October 2013; 18:00	Glibko, Managarova 10	(11–15)	Bernatavičiūtė 14	Palace of Sports Yunost, Zaporizhia; Attendance: 1,400; Referees: Aghakishi, Aghakishi (AZE)
24 October 2013; 18:00	2× (yellow card) 4× (suspension)	Report	2× (yellow card) 3× (suspension)	Palace of Sports Yunost, Zaporizhia; Attendance: 1,400; Referees: Aghakishi, Aghakishi (AZE)

24 October 2013; 21:00	Denmark	42 – 27	Austria	Roskilde Hallerne, Roskilde; Attendance: 1,879; Referees: Gasmi, Gasmi (FRA)
24 October 2013; 21:00	Nørgaard 9	(20–11)	Frey 8	Roskilde Hallerne, Roskilde; Attendance: 1,879; Referees: Gasmi, Gasmi (FRA)
24 October 2013; 21:00	3× (yellow card) 3× (suspension)	Report	3× (yellow card) 4× (suspension)	Roskilde Hallerne, Roskilde; Attendance: 1,879; Referees: Gasmi, Gasmi (FRA)

27 October 2013; 18:00	Lithuania	31 – 38	Denmark	Cido Arena, Panevėžys; Attendance: 200; Referees: Gutowska, Lesiak (POL)
27 October 2013; 18:00	Satkauskaitė 9	(12–21)	Burgaard, Dalby 5	Cido Arena, Panevėžys; Attendance: 200; Referees: Gutowska, Lesiak (POL)
27 October 2013; 18:00	3× (yellow card) 3× (suspension)	Report	2× (yellow card) 2× (suspension)	Cido Arena, Panevėžys; Attendance: 200; Referees: Gutowska, Lesiak (POL)

27 October 2013; 20:25	Austria	34 – 28	Ukraine	Sport Halle Krems, Krems an der Donau; Attendance: 800; Referees: Ilieva, Karbeska (MKD)
27 October 2013; 20:25	Scheffknecht 13	(18–12)	Borshchenko 8	Sport Halle Krems, Krems an der Donau; Attendance: 800; Referees: Ilieva, Karbeska (MKD)
27 October 2013; 20:25	3× (yellow card) 4× (suspension)	Report	3× (yellow card) 2× (suspension)	Sport Halle Krems, Krems an der Donau; Attendance: 800; Referees: Ilieva, Karbeska (MKD)

27 March 2014; 18:30	Lithuania	28 – 31	Austria	Cido Arena, Panevėžys; Attendance: 400; Referees: Năstase, Stancu (ROU)
27 March 2014; 18:30	Bernatavičiūtė 8	(13–13)	Scheffknecht 12	Cido Arena, Panevėžys; Attendance: 400; Referees: Năstase, Stancu (ROU)
27 March 2014; 18:30	3× (yellow card) 5× (suspension)	Report	1× (yellow card) 6× (suspension)	Cido Arena, Panevėžys; Attendance: 400; Referees: Năstase, Stancu (ROU)

29 March 2014; 21:15	Denmark	28 – 26	Ukraine	Kolding-Hallen, Kolding; Attendance: 1,454; Referees: Freitas, Carvalho (POR)
29 March 2014; 21:15	Jørgensen 6	(17–11)	Glibko, Managarova 5	Kolding-Hallen, Kolding; Attendance: 1,454; Referees: Freitas, Carvalho (POR)
29 March 2014; 21:15	3× (yellow card) 6× (suspension) 1× (red card)	Report	2× (yellow card) 5× (suspension)	Kolding-Hallen, Kolding; Attendance: 1,454; Referees: Freitas, Carvalho (POR)

29 March 2014; 20:25	Austria	32 – 22	Lithuania	Handballarena Rieden-Vorkloster, Bregenz; Attendance: 1,300; Referees: Andorka, Hucker (HUN)
29 March 2014; 20:25	Scheffknecht 9	(19–11)	Bernatavičiūtė 11	Handballarena Rieden-Vorkloster, Bregenz; Attendance: 1,300; Referees: Andorka, Hucker (HUN)
29 March 2014; 20:25	2× (yellow card) 4× (suspension)	Report	3× (yellow card) 6× (suspension)	Handballarena Rieden-Vorkloster, Bregenz; Attendance: 1,300; Referees: Andorka, Hucker (HUN)

4 June 2014; 17:10	Ukraine	24 – 28	Denmark	Chemkostav Arena, Michalovce, Slovakia; Attendance: 900; Referees: Mandak, Rudinsky (SVK)
4 June 2014; 17:10	Nikolayenko 7	(16–16)	Nørgaard 8	Chemkostav Arena, Michalovce, Slovakia; Attendance: 900; Referees: Mandak, Rudinsky (SVK)
4 June 2014; 17:10	5× (yellow card) 2× (suspension)	Report	5× (yellow card) 3× (suspension)	Chemkostav Arena, Michalovce, Slovakia; Attendance: 900; Referees: Mandak, Rudinsky (SVK)

7 June 2014; 17:15	Austria	29 – 33	Denmark	Albert Schultz Eishalle, Vienna; Attendance: 4,500; Referees: Opava, Válek (CZE)
7 June 2014; 17:15	Engel 8	(14–16)	Jørgensen 8	Albert Schultz Eishalle, Vienna; Attendance: 4,500; Referees: Opava, Válek (CZE)
7 June 2014; 17:15	3× (yellow card) 2× (suspension)	Report	3× (yellow card) 2× (suspension)	Albert Schultz Eishalle, Vienna; Attendance: 4,500; Referees: Opava, Válek (CZE)

11 June 2014; 18:30	Lithuania	25 – 36	Ukraine	Žalgiris Arena, Kaunas; Attendance: 1,301; Referees: Wyss, Zowa (SUI)
11 June 2014; 18:30	Satkauskaite 5	(12–15)	Managarova 8	Žalgiris Arena, Kaunas; Attendance: 1,301; Referees: Wyss, Zowa (SUI)
11 June 2014; 18:30	3× (yellow card) 3× (suspension)	Report	3× (yellow card) 1× (suspension)	Žalgiris Arena, Kaunas; Attendance: 1,301; Referees: Wyss, Zowa (SUI)

15 June 2014; 16:00	Denmark	35 – 27	Lithuania	Roskilde Hallen, Roskilde; Attendance: 1,648; Referees: Vešović, Mitrović (MNE)
15 June 2014; 16:00	Jørgensen 7	(21–12)	Bernatavičiūtė 10	Roskilde Hallen, Roskilde; Attendance: 1,648; Referees: Vešović, Mitrović (MNE)
15 June 2014; 16:00	3× (yellow card) 3× (suspension) 1× (red card)	Report	3× (yellow card) 1× (suspension)	Roskilde Hallen, Roskilde; Attendance: 1,648; Referees: Vešović, Mitrović (MNE)

15 June 2014; 20:20	Ukraine	33 – 24	Austria	Chemkostav Arena, Michalovce, Slovakia; Attendance: 550; Referees: Horváth, Márton (HUN)
15 June 2014; 20:20	Nikolayenko 12	(17–10)	Frey 9	Chemkostav Arena, Michalovce, Slovakia; Attendance: 550; Referees: Horváth, Márton (HUN)
15 June 2014; 20:20	3× (yellow card) 6× (suspension) 1× (red card)	Report	3× (yellow card) 5× (suspension)	Chemkostav Arena, Michalovce, Slovakia; Attendance: 550; Referees: Horváth, Márton (HUN)

=== Group 2 ===
Pos	Team	Pld	W	D	L	GF	GA	GD	Pts	Qualification
1	France	6	5	1	0	163	108	+55	11	Final tournament
2	Slovakia	6	3	1	2	154	139	+15	7	Final tournament
3	Iceland	6	3	0	3	151	136	+15	6	
4	Finland	6	0	0	6	106	191	−85	0	

23 October 2013; 19:30	Iceland	34 – 18	Finland	Vodafonehöllin, Reykjavík; Attendance: 550; Referees: Kijauskaite, Zaliene (LTU)
23 October 2013; 19:30	Jónsdóttir, Sigurðardóttir 5	(18–8)	Cainberg 10	Vodafonehöllin, Reykjavík; Attendance: 550; Referees: Kijauskaite, Zaliene (LTU)
23 October 2013; 19:30	3× (yellow card) 5× (suspension)	Report	3× (yellow card) 2× (suspension)	Vodafonehöllin, Reykjavík; Attendance: 550; Referees: Kijauskaite, Zaliene (LTU)

24 October 2013; 19:15	France	25 – 18	Slovakia	Kindarena, Rouen; Attendance: 4,400; Referees: Laurell, Engberg (SWE)
24 October 2013; 19:15	Baudouin, Lacrabère 6	(13–7)	Beňušková 5	Kindarena, Rouen; Attendance: 4,400; Referees: Laurell, Engberg (SWE)
24 October 2013; 19:15	3× (yellow card) 3× (suspension)	Report	3× (yellow card) 3× (suspension)	Kindarena, Rouen; Attendance: 4,400; Referees: Laurell, Engberg (SWE)

27 October 2013; 17:00	Slovakia	19 – 18	Iceland	Mestská hala, Šaľa; Attendance: 2,500; Referees: Năstase, Stancu (ROU)
27 October 2013; 17:00	Szarková 5	(9–9)	Knútsdóttir 7	Mestská hala, Šaľa; Attendance: 2,500; Referees: Năstase, Stancu (ROU)
27 October 2013; 17:00	3× (yellow card) 2× (suspension)	Report	2× (yellow card) 5× (suspension)	Mestská hala, Šaľa; Attendance: 2,500; Referees: Năstase, Stancu (ROU)

27 October 2013; 18:30	Finland	13 – 27	France	Energia Areena, Vantaa; Attendance: 1,529; Referees: Brunner, Salah (SUI)
27 October 2013; 18:30	Cainberg, Hilli 3	(8–17)	Baudouin 5	Energia Areena, Vantaa; Attendance: 1,529; Referees: Brunner, Salah (SUI)
27 October 2013; 18:30	3× (yellow card) 2× (suspension)	Report	3× (yellow card) 2× (suspension)	Energia Areena, Vantaa; Attendance: 1,529; Referees: Brunner, Salah (SUI)

26 March 2014; 19:00	Finland	25 – 27	Slovakia	Energia Areena, Vantaa; Attendance: 600; Referees: Rakytina, Tkachuk (UKR)
26 March 2014; 19:00	Roos 7	(14–12)	Dubajová 7	Energia Areena, Vantaa; Attendance: 600; Referees: Rakytina, Tkachuk (UKR)
26 March 2014; 19:00	3× (yellow card) 5× (suspension)	Report	3× (yellow card) 3× (suspension)	Energia Areena, Vantaa; Attendance: 600; Referees: Rakytina, Tkachuk (UKR)

26 March 2014; 19:30	Iceland	21 – 27	France	Laugardalshöll, Reykjavík; Attendance: 1,323; Referees: Opava, Válek (CZE)
26 March 2014; 19:30	Knútsdóttir 8	(11–15)	Baudouin, Dembélé 5	Laugardalshöll, Reykjavík; Attendance: 1,323; Referees: Opava, Válek (CZE)
26 March 2014; 19:30	3× (yellow card) 4× (suspension)	Report	3× (yellow card) 5× (suspension)	Laugardalshöll, Reykjavík; Attendance: 1,323; Referees: Opava, Válek (CZE)

29 March 2014; 17:30	France	24 – 19	Iceland	Palais des Sports de Beaublanc, Limoges; Attendance: 4,500; Referees: Vujačić, Kazanegra (MNE)
29 March 2014; 17:30	Niombla 8	(10–13)	Magnúsdóttir 8	Palais des Sports de Beaublanc, Limoges; Attendance: 4,500; Referees: Vujačić, Kazanegra (MNE)
29 March 2014; 17:30	3× (yellow card) 2× (suspension)	Report	3× (yellow card) 3× (suspension)	Palais des Sports de Beaublanc, Limoges; Attendance: 4,500; Referees: Vujačić, Kazanegra (MNE)

29 March 2014; 18:00	Slovakia	38 – 17	Finland	Chemkostav Arena, Michalovce; Attendance: 2,000; Referees: Čerņavskis, Bogdanovs (LAT)
29 March 2014; 18:00	Beňušková 7	(17–7)	Genberg, von Numers 4	Chemkostav Arena, Michalovce; Attendance: 2,000; Referees: Čerņavskis, Bogdanovs (LAT)
29 March 2014; 18:00	2× (yellow card) 3× (suspension)	Report	2× (yellow card) 2× (suspension)	Chemkostav Arena, Michalovce; Attendance: 2,000; Referees: Čerņavskis, Bogdanovs (LAT)

11 June 2014; 18:00	Slovakia	24 – 24	France	Mestská Sportova hala, Šaľa; Attendance: 2,900; Referees: Jurinović, Mrvica (CRO)
11 June 2014; 18:00	Beňušková 5	(15–12)	Deroin, Zaadi 4	Mestská Sportova hala, Šaľa; Attendance: 2,900; Referees: Jurinović, Mrvica (CRO)
11 June 2014; 18:00	2× (yellow card) 1× (suspension)	Report	3× (yellow card) 2× (suspension)	Mestská Sportova hala, Šaľa; Attendance: 2,900; Referees: Jurinović, Mrvica (CRO)

11 June 2014; 19:00	Finland	20 – 29	Iceland	Sisu Arena, Karis; Attendance: 400; Referees: Di Domenico, Fornasier (ITA)
11 June 2014; 19:00	Lönnborg 8	(6–18)	Einarsdóttir 6	Sisu Arena, Karis; Attendance: 400; Referees: Di Domenico, Fornasier (ITA)
11 June 2014; 19:00	3× (yellow card) 2× (suspension)	Report	3× (yellow card) 4× (suspension)	Sisu Arena, Karis; Attendance: 400; Referees: Di Domenico, Fornasier (ITA)

15 June 2014; 14:45	Iceland	30 – 28	Slovakia	Laugardalshöll, Reykjavík; Attendance: 975; Referees: Marić, Mašić (SRB)
15 June 2014; 14:45	Knútsdóttir 10	(16–12)	Szarková 10	Laugardalshöll, Reykjavík; Attendance: 975; Referees: Marić, Mašić (SRB)
15 June 2014; 14:45	2× (yellow card) 2× (suspension)	Report	2× (yellow card) 5× (suspension)	Laugardalshöll, Reykjavík; Attendance: 975; Referees: Marić, Mašić (SRB)

15 June 2014; 17:00	France	36 – 13	Finland	Vendéspace, Mouilleron-le-Captif; Attendance: 2,200; Referees: Sa, Sa (POR)
15 June 2014; 17:00	Gaudefroy, Lacrabère 8	(14–5)	Ax 3	Vendéspace, Mouilleron-le-Captif; Attendance: 2,200; Referees: Sa, Sa (POR)
15 June 2014; 17:00	2× (yellow card) 3× (suspension)	Report	3× (yellow card) 1× (suspension)	Vendéspace, Mouilleron-le-Captif; Attendance: 2,200; Referees: Sa, Sa (POR)

=== Group 3 ===
Pos	Team	Pld	W	D	L	GF	GA	GD	Pts	Qualification
1	Montenegro	6	5	1	0	150	134	+16	11	Final tournament
2	Poland	6	3	0	3	140	132	+8	6	Final tournament
3	Czech Republic	6	3	0	3	157	136	+21	6	
4	Portugal	6	0	1	5	127	172	−45	1	

23 October 2013; 18:00	Montenegro	25 – 21	Poland	Morača Sports Center, Podgorica; Attendance: 3,550; Referees: Mandak, Rudinsky (SVK)
23 October 2013; 18:00	Bulatović 11	(11–11)	Grzyb 6	Morača Sports Center, Podgorica; Attendance: 3,550; Referees: Mandak, Rudinsky (SVK)
23 October 2013; 18:00	3× (yellow card) 3× (suspension)	Report	3× (yellow card) 3× (suspension)	Morača Sports Center, Podgorica; Attendance: 3,550; Referees: Mandak, Rudinsky (SVK)

23 October 2013; 18:00	Czech Republic	35 – 20	Portugal	Sportovni hala Banik Most, Most; Attendance: 1,070; Referees: Florescu, Duţă (ROU)
23 October 2013; 18:00	Chrenková 6	(17–8)	Valente 4	Sportovni hala Banik Most, Most; Attendance: 1,070; Referees: Florescu, Duţă (ROU)
23 October 2013; 18:00	3× (yellow card) 2× (suspension)	Report	3× (yellow card) 2× (suspension)	Sportovni hala Banik Most, Most; Attendance: 1,070; Referees: Florescu, Duţă (ROU)

27 October 2013; 15:00	Portugal	24 – 29	Montenegro	Multidesportos Dr. Mário Mexia, Coimbra; Attendance: 1,000; Referees: Arntsen, Röen (NOR)
27 October 2013; 15:00	Andrade 8	(8–10)	Miljanić-Petrovic, Radičević 7	Multidesportos Dr. Mário Mexia, Coimbra; Attendance: 1,000; Referees: Arntsen, Röen (NOR)
27 October 2013; 15:00	2× (yellow card) 2× (suspension)	Report	2× (yellow card) 2× (suspension)	Multidesportos Dr. Mário Mexia, Coimbra; Attendance: 1,000; Referees: Arntsen, Röen (NOR)

27 October 2013; 17:40	Poland	19 – 22	Czech Republic	Globus Hall, Lublin; Attendance: 4,300; Referees: Zotin, Volodkov (RUS)
27 October 2013; 17:40	Stachowska 5	(9–9)	Luzumová 9	Globus Hall, Lublin; Attendance: 4,300; Referees: Zotin, Volodkov (RUS)
27 October 2013; 17:40	3× (yellow card) 2× (suspension)	Report	3× (yellow card) 1× (suspension)	Globus Hall, Lublin; Attendance: 4,300; Referees: Zotin, Volodkov (RUS)

26 March 2014; 16:20	Czech Republic	23 – 24	Montenegro	Sportovní hala Baník Most, Most; Attendance: 1,100; Referees: Gatelis, Mažeika (LTU)
26 March 2014; 16:20	Luzumová 7	(10–11)	Radičević 6	Sportovní hala Baník Most, Most; Attendance: 1,100; Referees: Gatelis, Mažeika (LTU)
26 March 2014; 16:20	3× (yellow card) 1× (suspension)	Report	3× (yellow card) 4× (suspension)	Sportovní hala Baník Most, Most; Attendance: 1,100; Referees: Gatelis, Mažeika (LTU)

26 March 2014; 21:00	Portugal	17 – 24	Poland	Pavilhão Municipal da Maia, Maia; Attendance: 900; Referees: Laurell, Engberg (SWE)
26 March 2014; 21:00	Silva 6	(7–11)	Kudłacz 7	Pavilhão Municipal da Maia, Maia; Attendance: 900; Referees: Laurell, Engberg (SWE)
26 March 2014; 21:00	3× (yellow card) 6× (suspension) 1× (red card)	Report	2× (yellow card) 1× (suspension)	Pavilhão Municipal da Maia, Maia; Attendance: 900; Referees: Laurell, Engberg (SWE)

30 March 2014; 16:00	Montenegro	25 – 22	Czech Republic	Sporthall Nikoljac, Bijelo Polje; Attendance: 3,000; Referees: Cohen, Peretz (ISR)
30 March 2014; 16:00	Bulatović 6	(12–11)	Luzumová 9	Sporthall Nikoljac, Bijelo Polje; Attendance: 3,000; Referees: Cohen, Peretz (ISR)
30 March 2014; 16:00	3× (yellow card) 2× (suspension)	Report	3× (yellow card) 3× (suspension)	Sporthall Nikoljac, Bijelo Polje; Attendance: 3,000; Referees: Cohen, Peretz (ISR)

30 March 2014; 17:30	Poland	29 – 21	Portugal	CRS Hall Zielona Góra, Zielona Góra; Attendance: 5,000; Referees: Hatipoğlu, Şimşek (TUR)
30 March 2014; 17:30	Byzdra 4	(14–8)	Ferreira 7	CRS Hall Zielona Góra, Zielona Góra; Attendance: 5,000; Referees: Hatipoğlu, Şimşek (TUR)
30 March 2014; 17:30	3× (yellow card) 3× (suspension) 1× (red card)	Report	3× (yellow card) 6× (suspension) 1× (red card)	CRS Hall Zielona Góra, Zielona Góra; Attendance: 5,000; Referees: Hatipoğlu, Şimşek (TUR)

11 June 2014; 20:00	Portugal	23 – 33	Czech Republic	Pavilhao Municipal Pedro Do Sul, São Pedro do Sul; Attendance: 1,300; Referees: Pandzić, Mosorinski (SRB)
11 June 2014; 20:00	Aguiar 7	(9–14)	Luzumová 6	Pavilhao Municipal Pedro Do Sul, São Pedro do Sul; Attendance: 1,300; Referees: Pandzić, Mosorinski (SRB)
11 June 2014; 20:00	3× (yellow card) 1× (suspension)	Report	3× (yellow card) 2× (suspension)	Pavilhao Municipal Pedro Do Sul, São Pedro do Sul; Attendance: 1,300; Referees: Pandzić, Mosorinski (SRB)

11 June 2014; 20:20	Poland	22 – 25	Montenegro	Hala Sportowa Częstochowa, Częstochowa; Attendance: 6,700; Referees: Năstase, Stancu (ROU)
11 June 2014; 20:20	Wojtas 6	(11–10)	Bulatović 8	Hala Sportowa Częstochowa, Częstochowa; Attendance: 6,700; Referees: Năstase, Stancu (ROU)
11 June 2014; 20:20	2× (yellow card) 3× (suspension)	Report	3× (yellow card) 4× (suspension)	Hala Sportowa Częstochowa, Częstochowa; Attendance: 6,700; Referees: Năstase, Stancu (ROU)

14 June 2014; 11:25	Czech Republic	22 – 25	Poland	Městská hala míčových sportů, Brno; Attendance: 2,500; Referees: Konjičanin, Konjičanin (BIH)
14 June 2014; 11:25	Kutlvašrová 7	(10–16)	Kudlacz 8	Městská hala míčových sportů, Brno; Attendance: 2,500; Referees: Konjičanin, Konjičanin (BIH)
14 June 2014; 11:25	2× (yellow card) 1× (suspension)	Report	3× (yellow card) 4× (suspension)	Městská hala míčových sportů, Brno; Attendance: 2,500; Referees: Konjičanin, Konjičanin (BIH)

15 June 2014; 20:00	Montenegro	22 – 22	Portugal	Sportski Centar Nikšić, Nikšić; Attendance: 750; Referees: Pech, Vágvölgyi (HUN)
15 June 2014; 20:00	Malović 8	(13–12)	Ferreira 6	Sportski Centar Nikšić, Nikšić; Attendance: 750; Referees: Pech, Vágvölgyi (HUN)
15 June 2014; 20:00	3× (yellow card) 5× (suspension)	Report	2× (yellow card) 2× (suspension)	Sportski Centar Nikšić, Nikšić; Attendance: 750; Referees: Pech, Vágvölgyi (HUN)

=== Group 4 ===
Pos	Team	Pld	W	D	L	GF	GA	GD	Pts	Qualification
1	Spain	6	5	0	1	160	106	+54	10	Final tournament
2	Netherlands	6	5	0	1	170	122	+48	10	Final tournament
3	Turkey	6	2	0	4	110	166	−56	4	
4	Italy	6	0	0	6	105	151	−46	0	

23 October 2013; 19:30	Netherlands	28 – 13	Italy	Topsportcentrum Rotterdam, Rotterdam; Attendance: 2,000; Referees: Pech, Vágvölgyi (HUN)
23 October 2013; 19:30	van der Heijden 6	(12–9)	Gheorghe 4	Topsportcentrum Rotterdam, Rotterdam; Attendance: 2,000; Referees: Pech, Vágvölgyi (HUN)
23 October 2013; 19:30	3× (yellow card) 2× (suspension)	Report	3× (yellow card) 2× (suspension)	Topsportcentrum Rotterdam, Rotterdam; Attendance: 2,000; Referees: Pech, Vágvölgyi (HUN)

24 October 2013; 20:00	Spain	28 – 11	Turkey	Palacio de los Deportes de León, León; Attendance: 2,000; Referees: Vesović, Mitrović (MNE)
24 October 2013; 20:00	Barbosa 9	(15–5)	Şahin 3	Palacio de los Deportes de León, León; Attendance: 2,000; Referees: Vesović, Mitrović (MNE)
24 October 2013; 20:00	3× (yellow card) 3× (suspension)	Report	3× (yellow card) 4× (suspension)	Palacio de los Deportes de León, León; Attendance: 2,000; Referees: Vesović, Mitrović (MNE)

26 October 2013; 20:00	Italy	11 – 27	Spain	Anfiteatro Giovanni Paolo II, Pescara; Attendance: 900; Referees: Alpaidze, Berezkina (RUS)
26 October 2013; 20:00	Fanton 4	(6–13)	Pinedo 7	Anfiteatro Giovanni Paolo II, Pescara; Attendance: 900; Referees: Alpaidze, Berezkina (RUS)
26 October 2013; 20:00	2× (yellow card) 3× (suspension)	Report	3× (yellow card) 4× (suspension)	Anfiteatro Giovanni Paolo II, Pescara; Attendance: 900; Referees: Alpaidze, Berezkina (RUS)

27 October 2013; 18:00	Turkey	17 – 32	Netherlands	THF Sport Hall, Ankara; Attendance: 900; Referees: Bounouara, Sami (FRA)
27 October 2013; 18:00	İskenderoğlu 5	(8–17)	van der Heijden 6	THF Sport Hall, Ankara; Attendance: 900; Referees: Bounouara, Sami (FRA)
27 October 2013; 18:00	2× (yellow card) 1× (suspension)	Report	2× (yellow card) 1× (suspension)	THF Sport Hall, Ankara; Attendance: 900; Referees: Bounouara, Sami (FRA)

26 March 2014; 19:30	Netherlands	27 – 22	Spain	Topsportcentrum Rotterdam, Rotterdam; Attendance: 2,000; Referees: Bonaventura, Bonaventura (FRA)
26 March 2014; 19:30	Abbingh 7	(17–12)	Barbosa 8	Topsportcentrum Rotterdam, Rotterdam; Attendance: 2,000; Referees: Bonaventura, Bonaventura (FRA)
26 March 2014; 19:30	3× (yellow card) 3× (suspension)	Report	3× (yellow card) 3× (suspension)	Topsportcentrum Rotterdam, Rotterdam; Attendance: 2,000; Referees: Bonaventura, Bonaventura (FRA)

27 March 2014; 20:00	Italy	21 – 22	Turkey	Palazzetto dello Sport Santa Filomena, Chieti; Attendance: 1,000; Referees: Antić, Jakovljević (SRB)
27 March 2014; 20:00	Gheorghe 9	(11–13)	three players 4	Palazzetto dello Sport Santa Filomena, Chieti; Attendance: 1,000; Referees: Antić, Jakovljević (SRB)
27 March 2014; 20:00	3× (yellow card) 1× (suspension)	Report	3× (yellow card) 3× (suspension)	Palazzetto dello Sport Santa Filomena, Chieti; Attendance: 1,000; Referees: Antić, Jakovljević (SRB)

29 March 2014; 17:00	Turkey	23 – 21	Italy	THF Sport Hall, Ankara; Attendance: 550; Referees: Jørum, Stenhaugmo (NOR)
29 March 2014; 17:00	Özel 8	(10–9)	Niederwieser 6	THF Sport Hall, Ankara; Attendance: 550; Referees: Jørum, Stenhaugmo (NOR)
29 March 2014; 17:00	3× (yellow card) 1× (suspension)	Report	3× (yellow card) 2× (suspension)	THF Sport Hall, Ankara; Attendance: 550; Referees: Jørum, Stenhaugmo (NOR)

30 March 2014; 13:00	Spain	29 – 22	Netherlands	Palacio de los Deportes de La Rioja, Logroño; Attendance: 2,518; Referees: Marić, Mašić (SRB)
30 March 2014; 13:00	Barbosa 8	(16–14)	Malestein 5	Palacio de los Deportes de La Rioja, Logroño; Attendance: 2,518; Referees: Marić, Mašić (SRB)
30 March 2014; 13:00	2× (yellow card) 6× (suspension)	Report	3× (yellow card) 5× (suspension)	Palacio de los Deportes de La Rioja, Logroño; Attendance: 2,518; Referees: Marić, Mašić (SRB)

11 June 2014; 19:00	Turkey	16 – 27	Spain	THF Sport Hall, Ankara; Attendance: 350; Referees: Santos, Fonseca (POR)
11 June 2014; 19:00	Hosgör 4	(6–13)	Barbosa 6	THF Sport Hall, Ankara; Attendance: 350; Referees: Santos, Fonseca (POR)
11 June 2014; 19:00	3× (yellow card) 4× (suspension)	Report	2× (yellow card) 3× (suspension)	THF Sport Hall, Ankara; Attendance: 350; Referees: Santos, Fonseca (POR)

12 June 2014; 20:00	Italy	20 – 24	Netherlands	Pala San Giacomo, Bari; Attendance: 2,000; Referees: Ilieva, Karbeska (MKD)
12 June 2014; 20:00	Gheorghe 7	(10–13)	Schoenaker 5	Pala San Giacomo, Bari; Attendance: 2,000; Referees: Ilieva, Karbeska (MKD)
12 June 2014; 20:00	2× (yellow card) 5× (suspension)	Report	3× (yellow card) 3× (suspension)	Pala San Giacomo, Bari; Attendance: 2,000; Referees: Ilieva, Karbeska (MKD)

14 June 2014; 17:30	Spain	27 – 19	Italy	Quijote Arena, Ciudad Real; Attendance: 1,900; Referees: Freitas, Carvalho (POR)
14 June 2014; 17:30	Barbosa 7	(14–10)	Gheorghe, Niederwieser 7	Quijote Arena, Ciudad Real; Attendance: 1,900; Referees: Freitas, Carvalho (POR)
14 June 2014; 17:30	3× (yellow card) 4× (suspension)	Report	3× (yellow card) 4× (suspension)	Quijote Arena, Ciudad Real; Attendance: 1,900; Referees: Freitas, Carvalho (POR)

15 June 2014; 14:00	Netherlands	37 – 21	Turkey	Topsportcentrum Rotterdam, Rotterdam; Attendance: 2,000; Referees: Laurell, Engberg (SWE)
15 June 2014; 14:00	Van der Heijden 8	(18–12)	three players 3	Topsportcentrum Rotterdam, Rotterdam; Attendance: 2,000; Referees: Laurell, Engberg (SWE)
15 June 2014; 14:00	3× (yellow card) 2× (suspension)	Report	3× (yellow card) 3× (suspension)	Topsportcentrum Rotterdam, Rotterdam; Attendance: 2,000; Referees: Laurell, Engberg (SWE)

=== Group 5 ===
Pos	Team	Pld	W	D	L	GF	GA	GD	Pts	Qualification
1	Sweden	6	4	2	0	173	134	+39	10	Final tournament
2	Serbia	6	3	2	1	156	140	+16	8	Final tournament
3	Slovenia	6	3	0	3	162	173	−11	6	
4	Switzerland	6	0	0	6	131	175	−44	0	

23 October 2013; 18:00	Serbia	32 – 21	Switzerland	Sports Hall, Vrnjačka Banja; Attendance: 1,200; Referees: Hatipoğlu, Şimşek (TUR)
23 October 2013; 18:00	Lojpur 7	(15–6)	three players 4	Sports Hall, Vrnjačka Banja; Attendance: 1,200; Referees: Hatipoğlu, Şimşek (TUR)
23 October 2013; 18:00	3× (yellow card) 7× (suspension)	Report	3× (yellow card) 3× (suspension)	Sports Hall, Vrnjačka Banja; Attendance: 1,200; Referees: Hatipoğlu, Şimşek (TUR)

23 October 2013; 19:15	Sweden	30 – 25	Slovenia	Idrottens Hus, Helsingborg; Attendance: 2,139; Referees: Rakytina, Tkachuk (UKR)
23 October 2013; 19:15	Alm 8	(16–12)	Lazović-Varlec 7	Idrottens Hus, Helsingborg; Attendance: 2,139; Referees: Rakytina, Tkachuk (UKR)
23 October 2013; 19:15	3× (yellow card) 4× (suspension)	Report	3× (yellow card) 5× (suspension)	Idrottens Hus, Helsingborg; Attendance: 2,139; Referees: Rakytina, Tkachuk (UKR)

27 October 2013; 15:30	Switzerland	22 – 30	Sweden	Saalsporthalle Zürich, Zürich; Attendance: 800; Referees: Panayides, Andreou (CYP)
27 October 2013; 15:30	Frey, Weigelt 6	(11–13)	Fogelström, Gulldén 6	Saalsporthalle Zürich, Zürich; Attendance: 800; Referees: Panayides, Andreou (CYP)
27 October 2013; 15:30	3× (yellow card) 3× (suspension)	Report	3× (yellow card) 3× (suspension)	Saalsporthalle Zürich, Zürich; Attendance: 800; Referees: Panayides, Andreou (CYP)

27 October 2013; 18:00	Slovenia	31 – 26	Serbia	Tivoli Hall, Ljubljana; Attendance: 800; Referees: Gubica, Milošević (CRO)
27 October 2013; 18:00	Mavsar 6	(16–12)	Krpež 5	Tivoli Hall, Ljubljana; Attendance: 800; Referees: Gubica, Milošević (CRO)
27 October 2013; 18:00	3× (yellow card) 3× (suspension)	Report	3× (yellow card) 2× (suspension)	Tivoli Hall, Ljubljana; Attendance: 800; Referees: Gubica, Milošević (CRO)

27 March 2014; 20:00	Serbia	25 – 25	Sweden	Jezero Hall, Kragujevac; Attendance: 3,500; Referees: Stark, Ştefan (ROU)
27 March 2014; 20:00	Damnjanović 11	(14–14)	Torstensson 7	Jezero Hall, Kragujevac; Attendance: 3,500; Referees: Stark, Ştefan (ROU)
27 March 2014; 20:00	2× (yellow card) 3× (suspension)	Report	3× (yellow card) 2× (suspension)	Jezero Hall, Kragujevac; Attendance: 3,500; Referees: Stark, Ştefan (ROU)

27 March 2014; 20:00	Switzerland	22 – 24	Slovenia	Frohberg Stäfa, Stäfa; Attendance: 757; Referees: Martins, Martins (POR)
27 March 2014; 20:00	Weigelt 9	(13–14)	Gros, Koren 5	Frohberg Stäfa, Stäfa; Attendance: 757; Referees: Martins, Martins (POR)
27 March 2014; 20:00	3× (yellow card) 3× (suspension)	Report	3× (yellow card) 6× (suspension)	Frohberg Stäfa, Stäfa; Attendance: 757; Referees: Martins, Martins (POR)

30 March 2014; 17:30	Slovenia	30 – 29	Switzerland	Športna dvorana Kodeljevo, Ljubljana; Attendance: 1,200; Referees: Gasmi, Gasmi (FRA)
30 March 2014; 17:30	Gros 6	(15–16)	Weigelt 8	Športna dvorana Kodeljevo, Ljubljana; Attendance: 1,200; Referees: Gasmi, Gasmi (FRA)
30 March 2014; 17:30	3× (yellow card) 5× (suspension) 2× (red card)	Report	3× (yellow card) 7× (suspension) 1× (red card)	Športna dvorana Kodeljevo, Ljubljana; Attendance: 1,200; Referees: Gasmi, Gasmi (FRA)

30 March 2014; 18:15	Sweden	18 – 18	Serbia	Kristianstad Arena, Kristianstad; Attendance: 2,449; Referees: Alpaidze, Berezkina (RUS)
30 March 2014; 18:15	Torstensson 5	(9–10)	Lekić, Damnjanović 6	Kristianstad Arena, Kristianstad; Attendance: 2,449; Referees: Alpaidze, Berezkina (RUS)
30 March 2014; 18:15	3× (yellow card) 4× (suspension)	Report	3× (yellow card) 5× (suspension)	Kristianstad Arena, Kristianstad; Attendance: 2,449; Referees: Alpaidze, Berezkina (RUS)

11 June 2014; 20:00	Slovenia	27 – 34	Sweden	Športna dvorana Kodeljevo, Ljubljana; Attendance: 700; Referees: Schulze, Tönnies (GER)
11 June 2014; 20:00	Gros, Irman 5	(14–17)	Gulldén 8	Športna dvorana Kodeljevo, Ljubljana; Attendance: 700; Referees: Schulze, Tönnies (GER)
11 June 2014; 20:00	2× (yellow card) 3× (suspension)	Report	3× (yellow card) 5× (suspension)	Športna dvorana Kodeljevo, Ljubljana; Attendance: 700; Referees: Schulze, Tönnies (GER)

12 June 2014; 20:00	Switzerland	20 – 23	Serbia	Frohberg Stäfa, Stäfa; Attendance: 680; Referees: Rakytina, Tkachuk (UKR)
12 June 2014; 20:00	Dinkel 5	(12–13)	Lekić 5	Frohberg Stäfa, Stäfa; Attendance: 680; Referees: Rakytina, Tkachuk (UKR)
12 June 2014; 20:00	3× (yellow card) 3× (suspension)	Report	3× (yellow card) 3× (suspension)	Frohberg Stäfa, Stäfa; Attendance: 680; Referees: Rakytina, Tkachuk (UKR)

15 June 2014; 13:00	Sweden	36 – 17	Switzerland	Scandinavium, Gothenburg; Attendance: 3,506; Referees: Kijauskaite, Zaliene (LTU)
15 June 2014; 13:00	Johansson 6	(18–6)	Weigelt 6	Scandinavium, Gothenburg; Attendance: 3,506; Referees: Kijauskaite, Zaliene (LTU)
15 June 2014; 13:00	3× (yellow card) 1× (suspension)	Report	3× (yellow card) 3× (suspension)	Scandinavium, Gothenburg; Attendance: 3,506; Referees: Kijauskaite, Zaliene (LTU)

15 June 2014; 20:00	Serbia	32 – 25	Slovenia	Čair Sports Center, Niš; Attendance: 3,200; Referees: Krkačev, Kolevski (MKD)
15 June 2014; 20:00	Lekić 9	(18–15)	Gros 6	Čair Sports Center, Niš; Attendance: 3,200; Referees: Krkačev, Kolevski (MKD)
15 June 2014; 20:00	3× (yellow card)	Report	3× (yellow card) 3× (suspension) 1× (red card)	Čair Sports Center, Niš; Attendance: 3,200; Referees: Krkačev, Kolevski (MKD)

=== Group 6 ===
Pos	Team	Pld	W	D	L	GF	GA	GD	Pts	Qualification
1	Norway	4	4	0	0	120	94	+26	8	Final tournament
2	Romania	4	2	0	2	103	103	0	4	Final tournament
3	Belarus	4	0	0	4	101	127	−26	0	

23 October 2013; 18:00	Romania	23 – 25	Norway	Arena Antonio Alexe, Oradea; Attendance: 2,500; Referees: Brehmer, Skowronek (POL)
23 October 2013; 18:00	Ardean-Elisei, Marin 5	(10–11)	Dyhre Breivang 6	Arena Antonio Alexe, Oradea; Attendance: 2,500; Referees: Brehmer, Skowronek (POL)
23 October 2013; 18:00	3× (yellow card) 2× (suspension)	Report	3× (yellow card) 4× (suspension)	Arena Antonio Alexe, Oradea; Attendance: 2,500; Referees: Brehmer, Skowronek (POL)

27 October 2013; 16:15	Norway	30 – 18	Romania	Sotra Arena, Bergen; Attendance: 3,200; Referees: Bonaventura, Bonaventura (FRA)
27 October 2013; 16:15	Løke 6	(14–9)	Marin 6	Sotra Arena, Bergen; Attendance: 3,200; Referees: Bonaventura, Bonaventura (FRA)
27 October 2013; 16:15	3× (yellow card) 4× (suspension)	Report	3× (yellow card) 3× (suspension)	Sotra Arena, Bergen; Attendance: 3,200; Referees: Bonaventura, Bonaventura (FRA)

26 March 2014; 19:15	Norway	33 – 29	Belarus	Stavanger Idrettshall, Stavanger; Attendance: 7,140; Referees: Kijauskaite, Zaliene (LTU)
26 March 2014; 19:15	Herrem 9	(16–13)	Stsiapanava 7	Stavanger Idrettshall, Stavanger; Attendance: 7,140; Referees: Kijauskaite, Zaliene (LTU)
26 March 2014; 19:15	3× (yellow card) 3× (suspension)	Report	3× (yellow card) 2× (suspension)	Stavanger Idrettshall, Stavanger; Attendance: 7,140; Referees: Kijauskaite, Zaliene (LTU)

30 March 2014; 16:00	Belarus	24 – 32	Norway	Sport Complex Olympiets, Mogilev; Attendance: 1,450; Referees: Ilieva, Karbeska (MKD)
30 March 2014; 16:00	Lisok 4	(12–16)	Løke 6	Sport Complex Olympiets, Mogilev; Attendance: 1,450; Referees: Ilieva, Karbeska (MKD)
30 March 2014; 16:00	2× (yellow card) 2× (suspension)	Report	3× (yellow card) 3× (suspension)	Sport Complex Olympiets, Mogilev; Attendance: 1,450; Referees: Ilieva, Karbeska (MKD)

11 June 2014; 18:00	Belarus	28 – 30	Romania	Sport Complex Olympiets, Mogilev; Attendance: 1,490; Referees: Leandersson, Lindroos (FIN)
11 June 2014; 18:00	Ezhikova 6	(13–14)	Ardean-Elisei 9	Sport Complex Olympiets, Mogilev; Attendance: 1,490; Referees: Leandersson, Lindroos (FIN)
11 June 2014; 18:00	3× (yellow card) 2× (suspension)	Report	3× (yellow card) 3× (suspension)	Sport Complex Olympiets, Mogilev; Attendance: 1,490; Referees: Leandersson, Lindroos (FIN)

15 June 2014; 18:30	Romania	32 – 20	Belarus	Lascăr Pană, Baia Mare; Attendance: 2,000; Referees: Hájek, Macho (CZE)
15 June 2014; 18:30	Nechita 8	(15–6)	Stsiapanava 5	Lascăr Pană, Baia Mare; Attendance: 2,000; Referees: Hájek, Macho (CZE)
15 June 2014; 18:30	3× (yellow card) 4× (suspension)	Report	3× (yellow card) 1× (suspension)	Lascăr Pană, Baia Mare; Attendance: 2,000; Referees: Hájek, Macho (CZE)

=== Group 7 ===
Pos	Team	Pld	W	D	L	GF	GA	GD	Pts	Qualification
1	Germany	4	3	0	1	114	93	+21	6	Final tournament
2	Russia	4	3	0	1	123	107	+16	6	Final tournament
3	Macedonia	4	0	0	4	84	121	−37	0	

23 October 2013; 19:30	Germany	32 – 27	Russia	Trier Arena, Trier; Attendance: 1,480; Referees: Kurtagic, Wetterwik (SWE)
23 October 2013; 19:30	Müller, Zapf 9	(18–11)	Davydenko 5	Trier Arena, Trier; Attendance: 1,480; Referees: Kurtagic, Wetterwik (SWE)
23 October 2013; 19:30	3× (yellow card) 3× (suspension)	Report	3× (yellow card) 5× (suspension)	Trier Arena, Trier; Attendance: 1,480; Referees: Kurtagic, Wetterwik (SWE)

27 October 2013; 18:00	Russia	29 – 28	Germany	Sportcomplex Zvezdniy, Astrakhan; Attendance: 3,000; Referees: Stark, Stefan (ROU)
27 October 2013; 18:00	Makeeva 5	(13–11)	Müller 9	Sportcomplex Zvezdniy, Astrakhan; Attendance: 3,000; Referees: Stark, Stefan (ROU)
27 October 2013; 18:00	3× (yellow card) 4× (suspension)	Report	3× (yellow card) 2× (suspension)	Sportcomplex Zvezdniy, Astrakhan; Attendance: 3,000; Referees: Stark, Stefan (ROU)

26 March 2014; 19:00	Russia	36 – 23	Macedonia	Palace of Sport, Rostov-on-Don; Attendance: 2,200; Referees: Horváth, Márton (HUN)
26 March 2014; 19:00	Ilina 7	(18–12)	Despodovska, Gjeorgjievska 6	Palace of Sport, Rostov-on-Don; Attendance: 2,200; Referees: Horváth, Márton (HUN)
26 March 2014; 19:00	3× (yellow card) 5× (suspension)	Report	3× (yellow card) 2× (suspension)	Palace of Sport, Rostov-on-Don; Attendance: 2,200; Referees: Horváth, Márton (HUN)

29 March 2014; 17:45	Macedonia	24 – 31	Russia	SRC Kale, Skopje; Attendance: 1,300; Referees: Brunovský, Čanda (SVK)
29 March 2014; 17:45	Gjeorgjievska 7	(9–18)	Chernoivanenko 6	SRC Kale, Skopje; Attendance: 1,300; Referees: Brunovský, Čanda (SVK)
29 March 2014; 17:45	3× (yellow card) 1× (suspension)	Report	3× (yellow card) 1× (suspension)	SRC Kale, Skopje; Attendance: 1,300; Referees: Brunovský, Čanda (SVK)

11 June 2014; 17:45	Macedonia	21 – 23	Germany	SRC Kale, Skopje; Attendance: 1,500; Referees: Leszczynski, Piechota (POL)
11 June 2014; 17:45	Despodovska 8	(11–9)	Müller 6	SRC Kale, Skopje; Attendance: 1,500; Referees: Leszczynski, Piechota (POL)
11 June 2014; 17:45	3× (yellow card) 2× (suspension)	Report	2× (yellow card) 2× (suspension)	SRC Kale, Skopje; Attendance: 1,500; Referees: Leszczynski, Piechota (POL)

14 June 2014; 12:30	Germany	31 – 16	Macedonia	GETEC Arena, Magdeburg; Attendance: 7,700; Referees: Olesen, Pedersen (DEN)
14 June 2014; 12:30	Müller 7	(14–5)	Despodovska 9	GETEC Arena, Magdeburg; Attendance: 7,700; Referees: Olesen, Pedersen (DEN)
14 June 2014; 12:30	3× (yellow card) 3× (suspension)	Report	3× (yellow card) 5× (suspension)	GETEC Arena, Magdeburg; Attendance: 7,700; Referees: Olesen, Pedersen (DEN)
