= 2015 World Women's Handball Championship – European qualification =

The European qualification for the 2015 World Women's Handball Championship, in Denmark was played over two rounds. The 2015 hosts Denmark were qualified automatically for the World Championship.

In the first round of qualification, 14 teams who were not participating at the 2014 European Championship were split into four groups. The group winners and the remaining 14 teams from the European Championship played a playoff afterwards to determine the other nine qualifiers.

== Qualification phase 1 ==
=== Seedings ===
The draw was made on 22 July at 11:00. The group winners advanced to the playoff round.

Pot 1	Pot 2	Pot 3
Austria; Belarus; Czech Republic; Iceland; Macedonia; Slovenia; Turkey	Italy; Lithuania; Portugal; Switzerland	Azerbaijan; Greece; Israel

=== Group 1 ===
The mini-tournament was hosted in Switzerland.

Pos	Team	Pld	W	D	L	GF	GA	GD	Pts	Qualification
1	Slovenia	3	3	0	0	101	77	+24	6	Qualification phase 2
2	Belarus	3	2	0	1	86	83	+3	4	
3	Switzerland (H)	3	1	0	2	80	73	+7	2	
4	Greece	3	0	0	3	70	104	−34	0	

(H) Hosts

3 December 2014; 17:45	Belarus	29–25	Greece	Saalsporthalle, Zürich; Attendance: 250; Referees: Marić, Mašić (SRB)
3 December 2014; 17:45	Mihdaliova, Yezhykava 5	(15–12)	Tsakalou 6	Saalsporthalle, Zürich; Attendance: 250; Referees: Marić, Mašić (SRB)
3 December 2014; 17:45	2× (yellow card) 4× (suspension)	Report	3× (yellow card) 2× (suspension)	Saalsporthalle, Zürich; Attendance: 250; Referees: Marić, Mašić (SRB)

3 December 2014; 20:15	Slovenia	27–21	Switzerland	Saalsporthalle, Zürich; Attendance: 650; Referees: Ilieva, Karbeska (MKD)
3 December 2014; 20:15	Lazović-Varlec 7	(16–10)	Furrer 4	Saalsporthalle, Zürich; Attendance: 650; Referees: Ilieva, Karbeska (MKD)
3 December 2014; 20:15	3× (yellow card) 4× (suspension)	Report	3× (yellow card) 2× (suspension)	Saalsporthalle, Zürich; Attendance: 650; Referees: Ilieva, Karbeska (MKD)

4 December 2014; 17:45	Greece	23–39	Slovenia	Saalsporthalle, Zürich; Attendance: 150; Referees: Marić, Mašić (SRB)
4 December 2014; 17:45	Logdanidou, Tsakalou 5	(9–16)	Hrnčič, Irman 7	Saalsporthalle, Zürich; Attendance: 150; Referees: Marić, Mašić (SRB)
4 December 2014; 17:45	3× (yellow card) 2× (suspension)	Report	2× (yellow card) 1× (suspension)	Saalsporthalle, Zürich; Attendance: 150; Referees: Marić, Mašić (SRB)

4 December 2014; 20:15	Switzerland	23–24	Belarus	Saalsporthalle, Zürich; Attendance: 450; Referees: Ilieva, Karbeska (MKD)
4 December 2014; 20:15	Scherer 6	(14–12)	Lobach, Yezhykava 5	Saalsporthalle, Zürich; Attendance: 450; Referees: Ilieva, Karbeska (MKD)
4 December 2014; 20:15	3× (yellow card) 3× (suspension)	Report	3× (yellow card) 3× (suspension)	Saalsporthalle, Zürich; Attendance: 450; Referees: Ilieva, Karbeska (MKD)

6 December 2014; 12:00	Slovenia	35–33	Belarus	Saalsporthalle, Zürich; Attendance: 217; Referees: Ilieva, Karbeska (MKD)
6 December 2014; 12:00	Gros 9	(17–18)	Mihdaliova 8	Saalsporthalle, Zürich; Attendance: 217; Referees: Ilieva, Karbeska (MKD)
6 December 2014; 12:00	3× (yellow card) 2× (suspension) 1× (red card)	Report	3× (yellow card) 5× (suspension) 1× (red card)	Saalsporthalle, Zürich; Attendance: 217; Referees: Ilieva, Karbeska (MKD)

6 December 2014; 14:30	Switzerland	36–22	Greece	Saalsporthalle, Zürich; Attendance: 380; Referees: Marić, Mašić (SRB)
6 December 2014; 14:30	Scherer 7	(16–11)	Tsakalou 6	Saalsporthalle, Zürich; Attendance: 380; Referees: Marić, Mašić (SRB)
6 December 2014; 14:30	3× (yellow card) 7× (suspension)	Report	2× (yellow card) 6× (suspension)	Saalsporthalle, Zürich; Attendance: 380; Referees: Marić, Mašić (SRB)

=== Group 2 ===
The mini-tournament was hosted in Austria.

Pos	Team	Pld	W	D	L	GF	GA	GD	Pts	Qualification
1	Austria (H)	3	3	0	0	102	60	+42	6	Qualification phase 2
2	Turkey	3	2	0	1	96	82	+14	4	
3	Portugal	3	1	0	2	88	74	+14	2	
4	Israel	3	0	0	3	55	125	−70	0	

(H) Hosts

4 December 2014; 18:00	Turkey	28–27	Portugal	Sportzentrum Alte Au, Stockerau; Attendance: 300; Referees: Christiansen, Hansen (DEN)
4 December 2014; 18:00	İskit 8	(14–14)	Rodrigues, Soares 6	Sportzentrum Alte Au, Stockerau; Attendance: 300; Referees: Christiansen, Hansen (DEN)
4 December 2014; 18:00	3× (yellow card) 3× (suspension)	Report	2× (yellow card) 4× (suspension) 1× (red card)	Sportzentrum Alte Au, Stockerau; Attendance: 300; Referees: Christiansen, Hansen (DEN)

4 December 2014; 20:15	Austria	41–15	Israel	Sportzentrum Alte Au, Stockerau; Attendance: 350; Referees: Praštalo, Todorović (BIH)
4 December 2014; 20:15	Engel, Grausenburger 6	(21–7)	Vikrat 5	Sportzentrum Alte Au, Stockerau; Attendance: 350; Referees: Praštalo, Todorović (BIH)
4 December 2014; 20:15	3× (yellow card) 6× (suspension)	Report	3× (yellow card) 5× (suspension)	Sportzentrum Alte Au, Stockerau; Attendance: 350; Referees: Praštalo, Todorović (BIH)

5 December 2014; 18:00	Portugal	21–29	Austria	Sportzentrum Alte Au, Stockerau; Attendance: 550; Referees: Christiansen, Hansen (DEN)
5 December 2014; 18:00	Rodrigues 6	(9–16)	Scheffknecht 9	Sportzentrum Alte Au, Stockerau; Attendance: 550; Referees: Christiansen, Hansen (DEN)
5 December 2014; 18:00	2× (yellow card) 5× (suspension)	Report	3× (yellow card) 5× (suspension)	Sportzentrum Alte Au, Stockerau; Attendance: 550; Referees: Christiansen, Hansen (DEN)

5 December 2014; 20:15	Israel	23–44	Turkey	Sportzentrum Alte Au, Stockerau; Attendance: 250; Referees: Praštalo, Todorović (BIH)
5 December 2014; 20:15	Bertaut 8	(10–18)	Topaloğlu 8	Sportzentrum Alte Au, Stockerau; Attendance: 250; Referees: Praštalo, Todorović (BIH)
5 December 2014; 20:15	3× (yellow card) 7× (suspension)	Report	3× (yellow card) 3× (suspension)	Sportzentrum Alte Au, Stockerau; Attendance: 250; Referees: Praštalo, Todorović (BIH)

6 December 2014; 14:20	Portugal	40–17	Israel	Sportzentrum Alte Au, Stockerau; Attendance: 100; Referees: Praštalo, Todorović (BIH)
6 December 2014; 14:20	Rodrigues 13	(20–8)	Vikrat 5	Sportzentrum Alte Au, Stockerau; Attendance: 100; Referees: Praštalo, Todorović (BIH)
6 December 2014; 14:20	3× (yellow card) 3× (suspension)	Report	2× (yellow card) 1× (suspension)	Sportzentrum Alte Au, Stockerau; Attendance: 100; Referees: Praštalo, Todorović (BIH)

6 December 2014; 18:25	Turkey	24–32	Austria	Sportzentrum Alte Au, Stockerau; Attendance: 1,200; Referees: Christiansen, Hansen (DEN)
6 December 2014; 18:25	İskenderoğlu 4	(11–15)	Magelinskas 10	Sportzentrum Alte Au, Stockerau; Attendance: 1,200; Referees: Christiansen, Hansen (DEN)
6 December 2014; 18:25	3× (yellow card) 4× (suspension)	Report	3× (yellow card) 5× (suspension)	Sportzentrum Alte Au, Stockerau; Attendance: 1,200; Referees: Christiansen, Hansen (DEN)

=== Group 3 ===
The teams opted to play the group in a home and away series.

Pos	Team	Pld	W	D	L	GF	GA	GD	Pts	Qualification
1	Iceland	4	4	0	0	114	83	+31	8	Qualification phase 2
2	Italy	4	2	0	2	88	95	−7	4	
3	Macedonia	4	0	0	4	87	111	−24	0	

9 October 2014; 17:45	Macedonia	20–23	Italy	SRC Kale, Skopje; Attendance: 1,500; Referees: Covalciuc, Covalciuc (MDA)
9 October 2014; 17:45	Gjeorgjievska 5	(14–11)	Gheorghe 6	SRC Kale, Skopje; Attendance: 1,500; Referees: Covalciuc, Covalciuc (MDA)
9 October 2014; 17:45	3× (yellow card) 1× (suspension)	Report	3× (yellow card) 5× (suspension)	SRC Kale, Skopje; Attendance: 1,500; Referees: Covalciuc, Covalciuc (MDA)

12 October 2014; 18:30	Italy	27–22	Macedonia	Palazzetto dello Sport, Follonica; Attendance: 2,000; Referees: Alpaidze, Berezkina (RUS)
12 October 2014; 18:30	Gheorghe 10	(11–9)	Gjeorgjievska, Mečevska 5	Palazzetto dello Sport, Follonica; Attendance: 2,000; Referees: Alpaidze, Berezkina (RUS)
12 October 2014; 18:30	3× (yellow card) 1× (suspension)	Report	3× (yellow card) 4× (suspension)	Palazzetto dello Sport, Follonica; Attendance: 2,000; Referees: Alpaidze, Berezkina (RUS)

27 November 2014; 17:30	Italy	17–26	Iceland	Pala Santa Filomena, Chieti; Attendance: 2, 000; Referees: Vujačić, Kažanegra (MNE)
27 November 2014; 17:30	Fanton 5	(8–13)	Knútsdóttir 9	Pala Santa Filomena, Chieti; Attendance: 2, 000; Referees: Vujačić, Kažanegra (MNE)
27 November 2014; 17:30	3× (yellow card) 2× (suspension)	Report	3× (yellow card) 2× (suspension)	Pala Santa Filomena, Chieti; Attendance: 2, 000; Referees: Vujačić, Kažanegra (MNE)

30 November 2014; 16:00	Iceland	27–21	Italy	Laugardalshöll, Reykjavík; Attendance: 750; Referees: Brehmer, Skowronek (POL)
30 November 2014; 16:00	Knútsdóttir 11	(13–7)	Gheorghe 8	Laugardalshöll, Reykjavík; Attendance: 750; Referees: Brehmer, Skowronek (POL)
30 November 2014; 16:00	3× (yellow card) 3× (suspension)	Report	2× (yellow card) 4× (suspension)	Laugardalshöll, Reykjavík; Attendance: 750; Referees: Brehmer, Skowronek (POL)

3 December 2014; 19:30	Iceland	33–23	Macedonia	Laugardalshöll, Reykjavík; Attendance: 550; Referees: Hermann, Madsen (DEN)
3 December 2014; 19:30	Knútsdóttir 14	(17–12)	Mečevska 6	Laugardalshöll, Reykjavík; Attendance: 550; Referees: Hermann, Madsen (DEN)
3 December 2014; 19:30	3× (yellow card) 3× (suspension)	Report	3× (yellow card) 2× (suspension)	Laugardalshöll, Reykjavík; Attendance: 550; Referees: Hermann, Madsen (DEN)

6 December 2014; 17:45	Macedonia	22–28	Iceland	SRC Kale, Skopje; Attendance: 300; Referees: Pech, Vagvölgyi (HUN)
6 December 2014; 17:45	Despodovska 6	(11–12)	Pálsdóttir 6	SRC Kale, Skopje; Attendance: 300; Referees: Pech, Vagvölgyi (HUN)
6 December 2014; 17:45	3× (yellow card) 3× (suspension)	Report	3× (yellow card) 2× (suspension)	SRC Kale, Skopje; Attendance: 300; Referees: Pech, Vagvölgyi (HUN)

=== Group 4 ===
The mini-tournament was hosted in the Czech Republic.

Pos	Team	Pld	W	D	L	GF	GA	GD	Pts	Qualification
1	Czech Republic (H)	2	2	0	0	71	53	+18	4	Qualification phase 2
2	Lithuania	2	1	0	1	62	62	0	2	
3	Azerbaijan	2	0	0	2	55	73	−18	0	

(H) Hosts

28 November 2014; 18:00	Azerbaijan	26–38	Czech Republic	SK UP Olomouc, Olomouc; Attendance: 600; Referees: Năstase, Stancu (ROU)
28 November 2014; 18:00	Tankaskaya 8	(16–15)	Hrbková 7	SK UP Olomouc, Olomouc; Attendance: 600; Referees: Năstase, Stancu (ROU)
28 November 2014; 18:00	2× (yellow card) 6× (suspension) 1× (red card)	Report	3× (yellow card) 4× (suspension)	SK UP Olomouc, Olomouc; Attendance: 600; Referees: Năstase, Stancu (ROU)

29 November 2014; 17:00	Lithuania	35–29	Azerbaijan	SK UP Olomouc, Olomouc; Attendance: 150; Referees: Năstase, Stancu (ROU)
29 November 2014; 17:00	Šatkauskaitė 9	(23–15)	Peche 9	SK UP Olomouc, Olomouc; Attendance: 150; Referees: Năstase, Stancu (ROU)
29 November 2014; 17:00	2× (yellow card) 5× (suspension) 1× (red card)	Report	2× (yellow card) 5× (suspension)	SK UP Olomouc, Olomouc; Attendance: 150; Referees: Năstase, Stancu (ROU)

30 November 2014; 11:00	Czech Republic	33–27	Lithuania	SK UP Olomouc, Olomouc; Attendance: 700; Referees: Năstase, Stancu (ROU)
30 November 2014; 11:00	Hrbková, Kutlvašrová 6	(21–12)	Bernatavičiūtė 7	SK UP Olomouc, Olomouc; Attendance: 700; Referees: Năstase, Stancu (ROU)
30 November 2014; 11:00	2× (yellow card) 6× (suspension)	Report	2× (yellow card) 3× (suspension)	SK UP Olomouc, Olomouc; Attendance: 700; Referees: Năstase, Stancu (ROU)

== Qualification phase 2 ==
The teams played a home-and away series to determine the final tournament participants. The draw was made on 21 December 2014.

=== Seedings ===
Pot 1 (9 best ranked teams from the 2014 European Championship)	Pot 2 (5 lowest ranked teams from the 2014 European Championship + teams from the qualification round)
France; Germany; Hungary; Montenegro; Netherlands; Poland; Romania; Spain; Sweden	Austria; Croatia; Czech Republic; Iceland; Russia; Serbia; Slovakia; Slovenia; Ukraine

=== Matches ===
Team 1	Agg.	Team 2	1st leg	2nd leg
France	54–41	Slovenia	27–20	27–21
Germany	46–49	Russia	20–22	26–27
Serbia	54–56	Romania	26–32	28–24
Netherlands	56–48	Czech Republic	33–23	23–25
Ukraine	40–54	Poland	18–24	22–30
Montenegro	47–38	Iceland	28–19	19–19
Austria	44–74	Hungary	20–33	24–41
Spain	45–39	Slovakia	25–19	20–20
Croatia	44–51	Sweden	23–24	21–27

==== First leg ====
5 June 2015; 20:25	Austria	20–33	Hungary	Sportzentrum Alte Au, Stockerau; Attendance: 1,200; Referees: Florescu, Stoia (ROU)
5 June 2015; 20:25	Logvin, Magelinskas 5	(11–19)	Erdősi, Szucsánszki 7	Sportzentrum Alte Au, Stockerau; Attendance: 1,200; Referees: Florescu, Stoia (ROU)
5 June 2015; 20:25	3× (yellow card) 5× (suspension)	Report	3× (yellow card) 1× (suspension)	Sportzentrum Alte Au, Stockerau; Attendance: 1,200; Referees: Florescu, Stoia (ROU)

6 June 2015; 16:00	Netherlands	33–23	Czech Republic	Sporthal Valkenhuizen, Arnhem; Attendance: 2,876; Referees: Alpaidze, Berezkina (RUS)
6 June 2015; 16:00	Abbingh, Groot 7	(15–16)	Luzumová 8	Sporthal Valkenhuizen, Arnhem; Attendance: 2,876; Referees: Alpaidze, Berezkina (RUS)
6 June 2015; 16:00	3× (yellow card) 8× (suspension)	Report	3× (yellow card) 6× (suspension)	Sporthal Valkenhuizen, Arnhem; Attendance: 2,876; Referees: Alpaidze, Berezkina (RUS)

6 June 2015; 18:00	Serbia	26–32	Romania	Kraljevo Sports Hall, Kraljevo; Attendance: 2,200; Referees: Opava, Válek (CZE)
6 June 2015; 18:00	Radojević, Živković 5	(13–17)	Neagu 11	Kraljevo Sports Hall, Kraljevo; Attendance: 2,200; Referees: Opava, Válek (CZE)
6 June 2015; 18:00	3× (yellow card) 1× (suspension)	Report	3× (yellow card) 4× (suspension)	Kraljevo Sports Hall, Kraljevo; Attendance: 2,200; Referees: Opava, Válek (CZE)

6 June 2015; 19:00	Ukraine	18–24	Poland	Karpaty Arena Uzhhorod, Uzhhorod; Attendance: 800; Referees: Vujačić, Kazanegra (MNE)
6 June 2015; 19:00	Gorilskaya 6	(8–14)	Pielesz 8	Karpaty Arena Uzhhorod, Uzhhorod; Attendance: 800; Referees: Vujačić, Kazanegra (MNE)
6 June 2015; 19:00	3× (yellow card) 3× (suspension)	Report	3× (yellow card) 3× (suspension)	Karpaty Arena Uzhhorod, Uzhhorod; Attendance: 800; Referees: Vujačić, Kazanegra (MNE)

7 June 2015; 14:00	Spain	25–19	Slovakia	Centro Insular de Deportes, Las Palmas; Attendance: 2,200; Referees: Andorka, Hucker (HUN)
7 June 2015; 14:00	three players 6	(13–11)	Jakubisová 5	Centro Insular de Deportes, Las Palmas; Attendance: 2,200; Referees: Andorka, Hucker (HUN)
7 June 2015; 14:00	3× (yellow card) 2× (suspension)	Report	3× (yellow card) 3× (suspension)	Centro Insular de Deportes, Las Palmas; Attendance: 2,200; Referees: Andorka, Hucker (HUN)

7 June 2015; 15:00	Germany	20–22	Russia	Anhalt-Arena, Dessau; Attendance: 3,007; Referees: Năstase, Stancu (ROU)
7 June 2015; 15:00	Wohlbold 5	(8–10)	Kochetova 11	Anhalt-Arena, Dessau; Attendance: 3,007; Referees: Năstase, Stancu (ROU)
7 June 2015; 15:00	2× (yellow card) 7× (suspension) 1× (red card)	Report	3× (yellow card) 7× (suspension)	Anhalt-Arena, Dessau; Attendance: 3,007; Referees: Năstase, Stancu (ROU)

7 June 2015; 17:00	France	27–20	Slovenia	Brest Arena, Brest; Attendance: 4,000; Referees: Baumgart, Wild (GER)
7 June 2015; 17:00	Lacrabère 6	(15–11)	Mavsar 5	Brest Arena, Brest; Attendance: 4,000; Referees: Baumgart, Wild (GER)
7 June 2015; 17:00	3× (yellow card) 3× (suspension)	Report	3× (yellow card) 3× (suspension)	Brest Arena, Brest; Attendance: 4,000; Referees: Baumgart, Wild (GER)

7 June 2015; 17:15	Croatia	23–24	Sweden	Sport Hall Fran Galović, Koprivnica; Attendance: 2,000; Referees: Bonifert, Oláh (HUN)
7 June 2015; 17:15	Penezić, Sokač 6	(11–8)	Alm 7	Sport Hall Fran Galović, Koprivnica; Attendance: 2,000; Referees: Bonifert, Oláh (HUN)
7 June 2015; 17:15	3× (yellow card) 4× (suspension)	Report	2× (yellow card) 6× (suspension)	Sport Hall Fran Galović, Koprivnica; Attendance: 2,000; Referees: Bonifert, Oláh (HUN)

7 June 2015; 20:30	Montenegro	28–19	Iceland	Morača Sports Center, Podgorica; Attendance: 2,000; Referees: Stoļarovs, Līcis (LAT)
7 June 2015; 20:30	Bulatović, Knežević 9	(12–12)	Pekarskyte 5	Morača Sports Center, Podgorica; Attendance: 2,000; Referees: Stoļarovs, Līcis (LAT)
7 June 2015; 20:30	2× (yellow card) 1× (suspension)	Report	2× (yellow card) 1× (suspension)	Morača Sports Center, Podgorica; Attendance: 2,000; Referees: Stoļarovs, Līcis (LAT)

==== Second leg ====
13 June 2015; 13:30	Hungary	41–24	Austria	Audi Aréna, Győr; Attendance: 3,000; Referees: Arntsen, Røen (NOR)
13 June 2015; 13:30	three players 5	(17–10)	Engel 8	Audi Aréna, Győr; Attendance: 3,000; Referees: Arntsen, Røen (NOR)
13 June 2015; 13:30	3× (yellow card)	Report	2× (yellow card) 3× (suspension)	Audi Aréna, Győr; Attendance: 3,000; Referees: Arntsen, Røen (NOR)

Hungary won 74–44 on aggregate.

13 June 2015; 16:00	Slovenia	21–27	France	Rdeča dvorana, Velenje; Attendance: 1,000; Referees: Erdoğan, Özdeniz (TUR)
13 June 2015; 16:00	Gros 7	(10–14)	Lacrabère 7	Rdeča dvorana, Velenje; Attendance: 1,000; Referees: Erdoğan, Özdeniz (TUR)
13 June 2015; 16:00	3× (yellow card) 2× (suspension)	Report	3× (yellow card) 4× (suspension)	Rdeča dvorana, Velenje; Attendance: 1,000; Referees: Erdoğan, Özdeniz (TUR)

France won 54–41 on aggregate.

13 June 2015; 17:00	Russia	27–26	Germany	Sportcomplex Zvezdniy, Astrakhan; Attendance: 6,000; Referees: Marić, Marić (SRB)
13 June 2015; 17:00	Kochetova 7	(13–10)	Hubinger 5	Sportcomplex Zvezdniy, Astrakhan; Attendance: 6,000; Referees: Marić, Marić (SRB)
13 June 2015; 17:00	3× (yellow card) 1× (suspension)	Report	3× (yellow card) 3× (suspension)	Sportcomplex Zvezdniy, Astrakhan; Attendance: 6,000; Referees: Marić, Marić (SRB)

Russia won 49–46 on aggregate.

13 June 2015; 17:00	Romania	24–28	Serbia	Polyvalent Hall, Cluj-Napoca; Attendance: 7,300; Referees: Poulsen, Mortensen (DEN)
13 June 2015; 17:00	Neagu 7	(12–11)	three players 6	Polyvalent Hall, Cluj-Napoca; Attendance: 7,300; Referees: Poulsen, Mortensen (DEN)
13 June 2015; 17:00	2× (yellow card) 7× (suspension) 1× (red card)	Report	3× (yellow card) 3× (suspension)	Polyvalent Hall, Cluj-Napoca; Attendance: 7,300; Referees: Poulsen, Mortensen (DEN)

Romania won 56–54 on aggregate.

13 June 2015; 19:10	Czech Republic	25–23	Netherlands	Sportovní hala Baník Most, Most; Attendance: 800; Referees: Lah, Sok (SLO)
13 June 2015; 19:10	Luzumová 5	(11–10)	Abbingh 6	Sportovní hala Baník Most, Most; Attendance: 800; Referees: Lah, Sok (SLO)
13 June 2015; 19:10	3× (yellow card)	Report	3× (yellow card) 3× (suspension)	Sportovní hala Baník Most, Most; Attendance: 800; Referees: Lah, Sok (SLO)

Netherlands won 56–48 on aggregate.

14 June 2015; 14:15	Slovakia	20–20	Spain	Mestská športová hala, Šaľa; Attendance: 2,500; Referees: Rakytina, Tkachuk (UKR)
14 June 2015; 14:15	three players 4	(9–12)	Pena 4	Mestská športová hala, Šaľa; Attendance: 2,500; Referees: Rakytina, Tkachuk (UKR)
14 June 2015; 14:15	3× (yellow card) 3× (suspension)	Report	3× (yellow card) 2× (suspension)	Mestská športová hala, Šaľa; Attendance: 2,500; Referees: Rakytina, Tkachuk (UKR)

Spain won 45–39 on aggregate.

14 June 2015; 14:30	Iceland	19–19	Montenegro	Laugardalshöll, Reykjavík; Attendance: 600; Referees: Baranowski, Lemanowicz (POL)
14 June 2015; 14:30	Thrastardottir 5	(10–11)	K. Bulatović 6	Laugardalshöll, Reykjavík; Attendance: 600; Referees: Baranowski, Lemanowicz (POL)
14 June 2015; 14:30	3× (yellow card) 2× (suspension)	Report	3× (yellow card) 4× (suspension)	Laugardalshöll, Reykjavík; Attendance: 600; Referees: Baranowski, Lemanowicz (POL)

Montenegro won 47–38 on aggregate.

14 June 2015; 15:00	Poland	30–22	Ukraine	Azoty Arena, Szczecin; Attendance: 3,000; Referees: Vranes, Wenninger (AUT)
14 June 2015; 15:00	Stasiak 5	(17–9)	Nikolayenko 7	Azoty Arena, Szczecin; Attendance: 3,000; Referees: Vranes, Wenninger (AUT)
14 June 2015; 15:00	2× (yellow card) 5× (suspension)	Report	3× (yellow card) 7× (suspension)	Azoty Arena, Szczecin; Attendance: 3,000; Referees: Vranes, Wenninger (AUT)

Poland won 54–40 on aggregate.

14 June 2015; 18:15	Sweden	27–21	Croatia	Hovet, Stockholm; Attendance: 6,380; Referees: Kijauskaite, Zaliene (LTU)
14 June 2015; 18:15	Ahlm 7	(14–9)	Penezić 7	Hovet, Stockholm; Attendance: 6,380; Referees: Kijauskaite, Zaliene (LTU)
14 June 2015; 18:15	3× (yellow card) 4× (suspension)	Report	2× (yellow card) 1× (suspension)	Hovet, Stockholm; Attendance: 6,380; Referees: Kijauskaite, Zaliene (LTU)

Sweden won 51–44 on aggregate.
