= 2014 European Women's Handball Championship =

- Official logo

Tournament details
- Host countries: Hungary; Croatia
- Venue: 6 (in 6 host cities)
- Dates: 7–21 December
- Teams: 16 (from 1 confederation)

Final positions
- Champions: Norway (6th title)
- Runners-up: Spain
- Third place: Sweden
- Fourth place: Montenegro

Tournament statistics
- Matches played: 47
- Goals scored: 2,375 (50.53 per match)
- Attendance: 122,070 (2,597 per match)
- Top scorer(s): (Sweden) Isabelle Gulldén (58 goals)

Awards
- Best player: (Sweden) Isabelle Gulldén

The 2014 European Women's Handball Championship was the eleventh continental tournament for women's national teams, organized by the European Handball Federation. The second jointly hosted edition in the competition's history took place in Hungary and Croatia from 7 to 21 December 2014.

Norway won their sixth title after beating Spain 28–25 in the final. Sweden defeated Montenegro 25–23 to capture the bronze medal.

Norway's victory ensured their qualification for the 2016 Summer Olympics. However, they later won the 2015 World Women's Handball Championship, vacating the European champion Olympic berth which fell to Spain as the runner-up. The two next-best placed teams, Sweden and Montenegro, earned spots in the Olympic Qualification Tournaments.

== Host selection ==
Initially there were two applicants for the tournament, Slovenia and Turkey, with none of them having the experience of organizing a continental event before. However, both candidates withdrew their offers later, thus the host nation could not be selected on the 10th Ordinary EHF Congress between 24 and 25 September 2010 as it was planned.

Instead, the European Handball Federation re-launched the bidding process. As a result, six federations (Croatia, Hungary, Iceland, Slovakia, Sweden and Turkey) showed intention to host the championship. Until the final deadline of 28 January 2011, EHF received three bids from four federations:

- Hungary / Croatia (joint bid)
- Slovakia
- Turkey

After a thorough analysis, Slovakia was excluded from the race first, as they failed to ensure a minimum of four arenas that meet the strict criteria for the European Championship. The EHF Executive Committee decided between the two remaining aspirants on its meeting on 9 April 2011, awarding the right to host the 11th Women's EHF European Handball Championship to Hungary and Croatia.

== Venues ==
Country	City	Arena	Capacity	Round
Hungary	Budapest	László Papp Budapest Sports Arena	12,500	Knockout stage
Hungary	Debrecen	Főnix Hall	8,500	Group B, Main round
Hungary	Győr	Audi Aréna	5,000	Group A
Croatia	Zagreb	Arena Zagreb	15,200	Main round
Croatia	Varaždin	Varaždin Arena	5,200	Group C
Croatia	Osijek	Gradski vrt Hall	3,538	Group D

== Qualification ==
=== Qualified teams ===
Country	Qualified as	Qualified on	Previous appearances in tournament^{1}
Croatia	Host nation	9 April 2011	7 (1994, 1996, 2004, 2006, 2008, 2010, 2012)
Hungary	Host nation	9 April 2011	10 (1994, 1996, 1998, **2000**, 2002, 2004, 2006, 2008, 2010, 2012)
Norway	Winner of Group 6	26 March 2014	10 (1994, 1996, **1998**, 2000, 2002, **2004**, **2006**, **2008**, **2010**, 2012)
France	Winner of Group 2	29 March 2014	7 (2000, 2002, 2004, 2006, 2008, 2010, 2012)
Russia	Runner-up of Group 7	29 March 2014	10 (1994, 1996, 1998, 2000, 2002, 2004, 2006, 2008, 2010, 2012)
Montenegro	Winner of Group 3	30 March 2014	2 (2010, **2012**)
Denmark	Winner of Group 1	4 June 2014	10 (**1994**, **1996**, 1998, 2000, **2002**, 2004, 2006, 2008, 2010, 2012)
Germany	Winner of Group 7	11 June 2014	10 (1994, 1996, 1998, 2000, 2002, 2004, 2006, 2008, 2010, 2012)
Slovakia	Runner-up of Group 2	11 June 2014	1 (1994)
Spain	Winner of Group 4	11 June 2014	7 (1998, 2002, 2004, 2006, 2008, 2010, 2012)
Sweden	Winner of Group 5	11 June 2014	8 (1994, 1996, 2002, 2004, 2006, 2008, 2010, 2012)
Netherlands	Runner-up of Group 4	12 June 2014	4 (1998, 2002, 2006, 2010)
Poland	Runner-up of Group 3	14 June 2014	3 (1996, 1998, 2006)
Romania	Runner-up of Group 6	15 June 2014	9 (1994, 1996, 1998, 2000, 2002, 2004, 2008, 2010, 2012)
Serbia	Runner-up of Group 5	15 June 2014	3 (2008, 2010, 2012)
Ukraine	Runner-up of Group 1	15 June 2014	10 (1994, 1996, 1998, 2000, 2002, 2004, 2006, 2008, 2010, 2012)

^{1} Bold indicates champion for that year.

== Seeding ==
The draw was held on 19 June 2014 at 13:00 local time in Zagreb, Croatia.

Pot 1	Pot 2	Pot 3	Pot 4
Montenegro; Norway; Hungary; Sweden	Denmark; Germany; France; Spain	Croatia; Serbia; Russia; Romania	Ukraine; Poland; Slovakia; Netherlands

== Referees ==
12 referee pairs were selected:

Referees
Croatia	Dalibor Jurinović; Marko Mrvica
Czech Republic	Jiří Opava; Pavel Válek
Denmark	Dennis Stenrand; Anders Birch
France	Charlotte Bonaventura; Julie Bonaventura
Germany	Robert Schulze; Tobias Tönnies
Hungary	Péter Horváth; Balázs Márton

Referees
Norway	Kjersti Arntsen; Guro Røen
Romania	Diana-Carmen Florescu; Anamaria Stoia
Russia	Evgenij Zotin; Nikolaj Volodkov
Slovakia	Peter Brunovský; Vladimír Čanda
Spain	Andreu Marín; Ignacio García
Turkey	Kürşad Erdoğan; İbrahim Özdeniz

== Preliminary round ==
The playing schedule was released on 4 June 2014.

All times are local (UTC+1).

=== Group A ===
Pos	Team	Pld	W	D	L	GF	GA	GD	Pts	Qualification
1	Spain	3	3	0	0	81	72	+9	6	Main round
2	Hungary (H)	3	1	1	1	84	79	+5	3	Main round
3	Poland	3	1	0	2	74	84	−10	2	Main round
4	Russia	3	0	1	2	79	83	−4	1	

(H) Hosts

7 December 2014; 18:00	Spain	29–22	Poland	Audi Aréna, Győr; Attendance: 3,500; Referees: Jurinović, Mrvica (CRO)
7 December 2014; 18:00	Martín 9	(16–13)	Kudłacz 6	Audi Aréna, Győr; Attendance: 3,500; Referees: Jurinović, Mrvica (CRO)
7 December 2014; 18:00	3× (yellow card) 4× (suspension)	Report	3× (yellow card) 3× (suspension)	Audi Aréna, Győr; Attendance: 3,500; Referees: Jurinović, Mrvica (CRO)

7 December 2014; 20:30	Hungary	29–29	Russia	Audi Aréna, Győr; Attendance: 4,800; Referees: Brunovský, Čanda (SVK)
7 December 2014; 20:30	Triscsuk 6	(14–15)	Dmitrieva 7	Audi Aréna, Győr; Attendance: 4,800; Referees: Brunovský, Čanda (SVK)
7 December 2014; 20:30	2× (yellow card) 5× (suspension)	Report	3× (yellow card) 3× (suspension)	Audi Aréna, Győr; Attendance: 4,800; Referees: Brunovský, Čanda (SVK)

9 December 2014; 18:15	Russia	24–25	Spain	Audi Aréna, Győr; Attendance: 2,500; Referees: Erdoğan, Özdeniz (TUR)
9 December 2014; 18:15	Kuznetcova, Sen 5	(14–13)	Martín 9	Audi Aréna, Győr; Attendance: 2,500; Referees: Erdoğan, Özdeniz (TUR)
9 December 2014; 18:15	3× (yellow card) 5× (suspension)	Report	2× (yellow card) 7× (suspension) 1× (red card)	Audi Aréna, Győr; Attendance: 2,500; Referees: Erdoğan, Özdeniz (TUR)

9 December 2014; 20:30	Poland	23–29	Hungary	Audi Aréna, Győr; Attendance: 3,000; Referees: Opava, Válek (CZE)
9 December 2014; 20:30	Kudłacz 7	(7–14)	Mayer, Tomori 6	Audi Aréna, Győr; Attendance: 3,000; Referees: Opava, Válek (CZE)
9 December 2014; 20:30	4× (yellow card) 5× (suspension)	Report	3× (yellow card) 4× (suspension)	Audi Aréna, Győr; Attendance: 3,000; Referees: Opava, Válek (CZE)

11 December 2014; 18:15	Russia	26–29	Poland	Audi Aréna, Győr; Attendance: 4,100; Referees: Schulze, Tönnies (GER)
11 December 2014; 18:15	Bliznova, Punko 7	(11–13)	Kudłacz 9	Audi Aréna, Győr; Attendance: 4,100; Referees: Schulze, Tönnies (GER)
11 December 2014; 18:15	4× (yellow card) 5× (suspension)	Report	3× (yellow card) 9× (suspension) 1× (red card)	Audi Aréna, Győr; Attendance: 4,100; Referees: Schulze, Tönnies (GER)

11 December 2014; 20:30	Hungary	26–27	Spain	Audi Aréna, Győr; Attendance: 4,800; Referees: Bonaventura, Bonaventura (FRA)
11 December 2014; 20:30	Tomori, Triscsuk 6	(13–13)	Martín 10	Audi Aréna, Győr; Attendance: 4,800; Referees: Bonaventura, Bonaventura (FRA)
11 December 2014; 20:30	3× (yellow card) 2× (suspension)	Report	3× (yellow card) 5× (suspension)	Audi Aréna, Győr; Attendance: 4,800; Referees: Bonaventura, Bonaventura (FRA)

=== Group B ===
Pos	Team	Pld	W	D	L	GF	GA	GD	Pts	Qualification
1	Norway	3	3	0	0	88	63	+25	6	Main round
2	Denmark	3	1	1	1	82	79	+3	3	Main round
3	Romania	3	1	1	1	71	78	−7	3	Main round
4	Ukraine	3	0	0	3	68	89	−21	0	

7 December 2014; 18:15	Norway	27–19	Romania	Főnix Hall, Debrecen; Attendance: 2,000; Referees: Bonaventura, Bonaventura (FRA)
7 December 2014; 18:15	Oftedal 5	(16–7)	Neagu 7	Főnix Hall, Debrecen; Attendance: 2,000; Referees: Bonaventura, Bonaventura (FRA)
7 December 2014; 18:15	3× (yellow card) 1× (suspension)	Report	4× (yellow card) 4× (suspension)	Főnix Hall, Debrecen; Attendance: 2,000; Referees: Bonaventura, Bonaventura (FRA)

7 December 2014; 20:30	Denmark	32–23	Ukraine	Főnix Hall, Debrecen; Attendance: 1,500; Referees: Erdoğan, Özdeniz (TUR)
7 December 2014; 20:30	Nørgaard 8	(14–11)	Borshchenko 7	Főnix Hall, Debrecen; Attendance: 1,500; Referees: Erdoğan, Özdeniz (TUR)
7 December 2014; 20:30	3× (yellow card) 5× (suspension)	Report	4× (yellow card) 6× (suspension)	Főnix Hall, Debrecen; Attendance: 1,500; Referees: Erdoğan, Özdeniz (TUR)

9 December 2014; 18:15	Romania	29–29	Denmark	Főnix Hall, Debrecen; Attendance: 1,500; Referees: Brunovský, Čanda (SVK)
9 December 2014; 18:15	Neagu, Țăcălie 10	(16–12)	Fisker 8	Főnix Hall, Debrecen; Attendance: 1,500; Referees: Brunovský, Čanda (SVK)
9 December 2014; 18:15	3× (yellow card) 4× (suspension)	Report	3× (yellow card) 6× (suspension)	Főnix Hall, Debrecen; Attendance: 1,500; Referees: Brunovský, Čanda (SVK)

9 December 2014; 20:30	Ukraine	23–34	Norway	Főnix Hall, Debrecen; Attendance: 1,500; Referees: Schulze, Tönnies (GER)
9 December 2014; 20:30	Glibko 7	(13–17)	Mørk, Solberg 6	Főnix Hall, Debrecen; Attendance: 1,500; Referees: Schulze, Tönnies (GER)
9 December 2014; 20:30	2× (yellow card) 5× (suspension)	Report	1× (yellow card) 3× (suspension) 1× (red card)	Főnix Hall, Debrecen; Attendance: 1,500; Referees: Schulze, Tönnies (GER)

11 December 2014; 18:15	Romania	23–22	Ukraine	Főnix Hall, Debrecen; Attendance: 2,200; Referees: Jurinović, Mrvica (CRO)
11 December 2014; 18:15	Neagu 8	(12–9)	Borshchenko 10	Főnix Hall, Debrecen; Attendance: 2,200; Referees: Jurinović, Mrvica (CRO)
11 December 2014; 18:15	3× (yellow card) 5× (suspension)	Report	3× (yellow card) 3× (suspension)	Főnix Hall, Debrecen; Attendance: 2,200; Referees: Jurinović, Mrvica (CRO)

11 December 2014; 20:30	Norway	27–21	Denmark	Főnix Hall, Debrecen; Attendance: 2,000; Referees: Opava, Válek (CZE)
11 December 2014; 20:30	Løke 7	(12–13)	Burgaard, Nørgaard 4	Főnix Hall, Debrecen; Attendance: 2,000; Referees: Opava, Válek (CZE)
11 December 2014; 20:30	3× (yellow card) 3× (suspension)	Report	3× (yellow card) 3× (suspension)	Főnix Hall, Debrecen; Attendance: 2,000; Referees: Opava, Válek (CZE)

=== Group C ===
Pos	Team	Pld	W	D	L	GF	GA	GD	Pts	Qualification
1	Sweden	3	2	1	0	99	90	+9	5	Main round
2	Netherlands	3	1	1	1	86	87	−1	3	Main round
3	Germany	3	1	0	2	84	92	−8	2	Main round
4	Croatia (H)	3	1	0	2	83	83	0	2	

(H) Hosts

8 December 2014; 18:00	Germany	26–29	Netherlands	Varaždin Arena, Varaždin; Attendance: 2,000; Referees: Horváth, Márton (HUN)
8 December 2014; 18:00	Huber, Naidzinavicius 6	(11–12)	Polman 7	Varaždin Arena, Varaždin; Attendance: 2,000; Referees: Horváth, Márton (HUN)
8 December 2014; 18:00	2× (yellow card) 5× (suspension)	Report	2× (yellow card) 8× (suspension)	Varaždin Arena, Varaždin; Attendance: 2,000; Referees: Horváth, Márton (HUN)

8 December 2014; 20:15	Sweden	30–28	Croatia	Varaždin Arena, Varaždin; Attendance: 3,400; Referees: Zotin, Volodkov (RUS)
8 December 2014; 20:15	Gulldén 7	(17–17)	Penezić, Zebić 6	Varaždin Arena, Varaždin; Attendance: 3,400; Referees: Zotin, Volodkov (RUS)
8 December 2014; 20:15	3× (yellow card) 4× (suspension)	Report	3× (yellow card) 3× (suspension)	Varaždin Arena, Varaždin; Attendance: 3,400; Referees: Zotin, Volodkov (RUS)

10 December 2014; 18:00	Netherlands	30–30	Sweden	Varaždin Arena, Varaždin; Attendance: 1,500; Referees: Marín, García (ESP)
10 December 2014; 18:00	Polman 10	(14–14)	Odén 7	Varaždin Arena, Varaždin; Attendance: 1,500; Referees: Marín, García (ESP)
10 December 2014; 18:00	3× (yellow card) 3× (suspension)	Report	3× (yellow card) 4× (suspension)	Varaždin Arena, Varaždin; Attendance: 1,500; Referees: Marín, García (ESP)

10 December 2014; 20:15	Croatia	24–26	Germany	Varaždin Arena, Varaždin; Attendance: 3,000; Referees: Florescu, Stoia (ROU)
10 December 2014; 20:15	Penezić 13	(14–13)	Minevskaja, S. Müller 5	Varaždin Arena, Varaždin; Attendance: 3,000; Referees: Florescu, Stoia (ROU)
10 December 2014; 20:15	3× (yellow card)	Report	3× (yellow card) 5× (suspension)	Varaždin Arena, Varaždin; Attendance: 3,000; Referees: Florescu, Stoia (ROU)

12 December 2014; 18:00	Sweden	39–32	Germany	Varaždin Arena, Varaždin; Attendance: 1,300; Referees: Stenrand, Birch (DEN)
12 December 2014; 18:00	Gulldén 10	(23–17)	Nadgornaja 9	Varaždin Arena, Varaždin; Attendance: 1,300; Referees: Stenrand, Birch (DEN)
12 December 2014; 18:00	3× (yellow card) 4× (suspension)	Report	3× (yellow card) 1× (suspension)	Varaždin Arena, Varaždin; Attendance: 1,300; Referees: Stenrand, Birch (DEN)

12 December 2014; 20:15	Croatia	31–27	Netherlands	Varaždin Arena, Varaždin; Attendance: 3,000; Referees: Arntsen, Røen (NOR)
12 December 2014; 20:15	Penezić 11	(17–15)	Van der Heijden 5	Varaždin Arena, Varaždin; Attendance: 3,000; Referees: Arntsen, Røen (NOR)
12 December 2014; 20:15	3× (yellow card) 5× (suspension)	Report	2× (yellow card) 3× (suspension)	Varaždin Arena, Varaždin; Attendance: 3,000; Referees: Arntsen, Røen (NOR)

=== Group D ===
Pos	Team	Pld	W	D	L	GF	GA	GD	Pts	Qualification
1	France	3	3	0	0	72	54	+18	6	Main round
2	Montenegro	3	2	0	1	70	67	+3	4	Main round
3	Slovakia	3	1	0	2	65	70	−5	2	Main round
4	Serbia	3	0	0	3	56	72	−16	0	

8 December 2014; 18:00	France	21–18	Slovakia	Gradski vrt Hall, Osijek; Attendance: 1,300; Referees: Stenrand, Birch (DEN)
8 December 2014; 18:00	Dembélé 6	(7–9)	Školková, Trehubová 4	Gradski vrt Hall, Osijek; Attendance: 1,300; Referees: Stenrand, Birch (DEN)
8 December 2014; 18:00	4× (yellow card) 4× (suspension)	Report	4× (yellow card) 3× (suspension)	Gradski vrt Hall, Osijek; Attendance: 1,300; Referees: Stenrand, Birch (DEN)

8 December 2014; 20:15	Montenegro	22–19	Serbia	Gradski vrt Hall, Osijek; Attendance: 2,200; Referees: Florescu, Stoia (ROU)
8 December 2014; 20:15	K. Bulatović, Lazović 5	(10–8)	Lekić 6	Gradski vrt Hall, Osijek; Attendance: 2,200; Referees: Florescu, Stoia (ROU)
8 December 2014; 20:15	4× (yellow card) 3× (suspension)	Report	4× (yellow card) 1× (suspension)	Gradski vrt Hall, Osijek; Attendance: 2,200; Referees: Florescu, Stoia (ROU)

10 December 2014; 18:00	Serbia	16–27	France	Gradski vrt Hall, Osijek; Attendance: 1,400; Referees: Horváth, Márton (HUN)
10 December 2014; 18:00	Rajović, Stoiljković 4	(3–11)	Lacrabère 6	Gradski vrt Hall, Osijek; Attendance: 1,400; Referees: Horváth, Márton (HUN)
10 December 2014; 18:00	2× (yellow card) 2× (suspension)	Report	3× (yellow card) 7× (suspension) 1× (red card)	Gradski vrt Hall, Osijek; Attendance: 1,400; Referees: Horváth, Márton (HUN)

10 December 2014; 20:15	Slovakia	24–28	Montenegro	Gradski vrt Hall, Osijek; Attendance: 1,900; Referees: Arntsen, Røen (NOR)
10 December 2014; 20:15	Dubajová 5	(10–20)	Radičević 6	Gradski vrt Hall, Osijek; Attendance: 1,900; Referees: Arntsen, Røen (NOR)
10 December 2014; 20:15	3× (yellow card) 2× (suspension)	Report	3× (yellow card) 5× (suspension)	Gradski vrt Hall, Osijek; Attendance: 1,900; Referees: Arntsen, Røen (NOR)

12 December 2014; 18:00	Montenegro	20–24	France	Gradski vrt Hall, Osijek; Attendance: 2,000; Referees: Zotin, Volodkov (RUS)
12 December 2014; 18:00	Knežević 6	(12–12)	Pineau 8	Gradski vrt Hall, Osijek; Attendance: 2,000; Referees: Zotin, Volodkov (RUS)
12 December 2014; 18:00	3× (yellow card) 2× (suspension)	Report	4× (yellow card) 5× (suspension)	Gradski vrt Hall, Osijek; Attendance: 2,000; Referees: Zotin, Volodkov (RUS)

12 December 2014; 20:15	Serbia	21–23	Slovakia	Gradski vrt Hall, Osijek; Attendance: 2,600; Referees: Marín, García (ESP)
12 December 2014; 20:15	Cvijić 6	(11–6)	Jakubisová 8	Gradski vrt Hall, Osijek; Attendance: 2,600; Referees: Marín, García (ESP)
12 December 2014; 20:15	3× (yellow card) 4× (suspension)	Report	3× (yellow card) 4× (suspension) 1× (red card)	Gradski vrt Hall, Osijek; Attendance: 2,600; Referees: Marín, García (ESP)

== Main round ==
All times are local (UTC+1).

=== Group I ===
Pos	Team	Pld	W	D	L	GF	GA	GD	Pts	Qualification
1	Norway	5	4	0	1	134	119	+15	8	Semifinals
2	Spain	5	3	0	2	131	121	+10	6	Semifinals
3	Hungary (H)	5	3	0	2	124	117	+7	6	Fifth place game
4	Denmark	5	2	1	2	123	124	−1	5	
5	Romania	5	2	1	2	113	115	−2	5	
6	Poland	5	0	0	5	107	136	−29	0	

(H) Hosts

13 December 2014; 16:00	Poland	19–28	Denmark	Főnix Hall, Debrecen; Attendance: 2,500; Referees: Erdoğan, Özdeniz (TUR)
13 December 2014; 16:00	Siódmiak 5	(9–9)	Fisker 6	Főnix Hall, Debrecen; Attendance: 2,500; Referees: Erdoğan, Özdeniz (TUR)
13 December 2014; 16:00	3× (yellow card) 1× (suspension)	Report	3× (yellow card) 2× (suspension)	Főnix Hall, Debrecen; Attendance: 2,500; Referees: Erdoğan, Özdeniz (TUR)

13 December 2014; 18:15	Spain	26–29	Norway	Főnix Hall, Debrecen; Attendance: 4,000; Referees: Jurinović, Mrvica (CRO)
13 December 2014; 18:15	Pena 7	(16–16)	Riegelhuth 7	Főnix Hall, Debrecen; Attendance: 4,000; Referees: Jurinović, Mrvica (CRO)
13 December 2014; 18:15	2× (yellow card) 2× (suspension)	Report	3× (yellow card) 2× (suspension)	Főnix Hall, Debrecen; Attendance: 4,000; Referees: Jurinović, Mrvica (CRO)

13 December 2014; 20:30	Hungary	20–19	Romania	Főnix Hall, Debrecen; Attendance: 5,370; Referees: Zotin, Volodkov (RUS)
13 December 2014; 20:30	Szucsánszki, Triscsuk 4	(10–8)	Neagu 8	Főnix Hall, Debrecen; Attendance: 5,370; Referees: Zotin, Volodkov (RUS)
13 December 2014; 20:30	3× (yellow card) 3× (suspension)	Report	4× (yellow card) 6× (suspension)	Főnix Hall, Debrecen; Attendance: 5,370; Referees: Zotin, Volodkov (RUS)

15 December 2014; 16:00	Spain	20–22	Romania	Főnix Hall, Debrecen; Attendance: 1,500; Referees: Brunovský, Čanda (SVK)
15 December 2014; 16:00	Pinedo 5	(14–9)	Neagu 7	Főnix Hall, Debrecen; Attendance: 1,500; Referees: Brunovský, Čanda (SVK)
15 December 2014; 16:00	1× (yellow card) 4× (suspension)	Report	3× (yellow card) 4× (suspension)	Főnix Hall, Debrecen; Attendance: 1,500; Referees: Brunovský, Čanda (SVK)

15 December 2014; 18:15	Poland	24–26	Norway	Főnix Hall, Debrecen; Attendance: 2,500; Referees: Schulze, Tönnies (GER)
15 December 2014; 18:15	Drabik 5	(15–11)	Mørk 11	Főnix Hall, Debrecen; Attendance: 2,500; Referees: Schulze, Tönnies (GER)
15 December 2014; 18:15	3× (yellow card) 4× (suspension)	Report	2× (yellow card) 4× (suspension)	Főnix Hall, Debrecen; Attendance: 2,500; Referees: Schulze, Tönnies (GER)

15 December 2014; 20:30	Hungary	20–23	Denmark	Főnix Hall, Debrecen; Attendance: 5,000; Referees: Bonaventura, Bonaventura (FRA)
15 December 2014; 20:30	Tomori, Tóth 5	(9–11)	L. Jørgensen 6	Főnix Hall, Debrecen; Attendance: 5,000; Referees: Bonaventura, Bonaventura (FRA)
15 December 2014; 20:30	3× (yellow card) 1× (suspension)	Report	2× (yellow card) 2× (suspension)	Főnix Hall, Debrecen; Attendance: 5,000; Referees: Bonaventura, Bonaventura (FRA)

17 December 2014; 16:00	Poland	19–24	Romania	Főnix Hall, Debrecen; Attendance: 1,200; Referees: Erdoğan, Özdeniz (TUR)
17 December 2014; 16:00	five players 3	(9–11)	Neagu 9	Főnix Hall, Debrecen; Attendance: 1,200; Referees: Erdoğan, Özdeniz (TUR)
17 December 2014; 16:00	4× (yellow card) 2× (suspension)	Report	3× (yellow card) 3× (suspension)	Főnix Hall, Debrecen; Attendance: 1,200; Referees: Erdoğan, Özdeniz (TUR)

17 December 2014; 18:15	Spain	29–22	Denmark	Főnix Hall, Debrecen; Attendance: 3,000; Referees: Zotin, Volodkov (RUS)
17 December 2014; 18:15	Barbosa 6	(15–12)	L. Jørgensen 7	Főnix Hall, Debrecen; Attendance: 3,000; Referees: Zotin, Volodkov (RUS)
17 December 2014; 18:15	3× (yellow card) 1× (suspension)	Report	3× (yellow card) 4× (suspension)	Főnix Hall, Debrecen; Attendance: 3,000; Referees: Zotin, Volodkov (RUS)

17 December 2014; 20:30	Hungary	29–25	Norway	Főnix Hall, Debrecen; Attendance: 4,800; Referees: Jurinović, Mrvica (CRO)
17 December 2014; 20:30	Bulath 6	(15–11)	Løke 6	Főnix Hall, Debrecen; Attendance: 4,800; Referees: Jurinović, Mrvica (CRO)
17 December 2014; 20:30	3× (yellow card) 5× (suspension)	Report	2× (yellow card) 2× (suspension)	Főnix Hall, Debrecen; Attendance: 4,800; Referees: Jurinović, Mrvica (CRO)

=== Group II ===
Pos	Team	Pld	W	D	L	GF	GA	GD	Pts	Qualification
1	Montenegro	5	4	0	1	136	124	+12	8	Semifinals
2	Sweden	5	3	1	1	158	140	+18	7	Semifinals
3	France	5	3	1	1	115	109	+6	7	Fifth place game
4	Netherlands	5	2	1	2	134	127	+7	5	
5	Germany	5	1	1	3	138	141	−3	3	
6	Slovakia	5	0	0	5	106	146	−40	0	

14 December 2014; 15:45	Germany	20–27	Montenegro	Arena Zagreb, Zagreb; Attendance: 1,200; Referees: Opava, Válek (CZE)
14 December 2014; 15:45	Zapf 6	(10–12)	Knežević 8	Arena Zagreb, Zagreb; Attendance: 1,200; Referees: Opava, Válek (CZE)
14 December 2014; 15:45	2× (yellow card) 5× (suspension)	Report	3× (yellow card) 4× (suspension)	Arena Zagreb, Zagreb; Attendance: 1,200; Referees: Opava, Válek (CZE)

14 December 2014; 18:00	Sweden	29–26	France	Arena Zagreb, Zagreb; Attendance: 1,500; Referees: Marín, García (ESP)
14 December 2014; 18:00	Hagman 7	(12–14)	Lacrabère 10	Arena Zagreb, Zagreb; Attendance: 1,500; Referees: Marín, García (ESP)
14 December 2014; 18:00	3× (yellow card) 4× (suspension)	Report	2× (yellow card) 4× (suspension)	Arena Zagreb, Zagreb; Attendance: 1,500; Referees: Marín, García (ESP)

14 December 2014; 20:15	Netherlands	30–20	Slovakia	Arena Zagreb, Zagreb; Attendance: 1,200; Referees: Arntsen, Røen (NOR)
14 December 2014; 20:15	Polman 7	(17–10)	Školková 6	Arena Zagreb, Zagreb; Attendance: 1,200; Referees: Arntsen, Røen (NOR)
14 December 2014; 20:15	2× (yellow card) 3× (suspension)	Report	3× (yellow card) 1× (suspension)	Arena Zagreb, Zagreb; Attendance: 1,200; Referees: Arntsen, Røen (NOR)

16 December 2014; 15:45	Netherlands	27–31	Montenegro	Arena Zagreb, Zagreb; Attendance: 1,500; Referees: Florescu, Stoia (ROU)
16 December 2014; 15:45	Polman 8	(13–15)	K. Bulatović 10	Arena Zagreb, Zagreb; Attendance: 1,500; Referees: Florescu, Stoia (ROU)
16 December 2014; 15:45	3× (yellow card) 2× (suspension)	Report	3× (yellow card) 5× (suspension)	Arena Zagreb, Zagreb; Attendance: 1,500; Referees: Florescu, Stoia (ROU)

16 December 2014; 18:00	Sweden	31–22	Slovakia	Arena Zagreb, Zagreb; Attendance: 1,300; Referees: Horváth, Márton (HUN)
16 December 2014; 18:00	Gulldén 9	(17–11)	Szarková 7	Arena Zagreb, Zagreb; Attendance: 1,300; Referees: Horváth, Márton (HUN)
16 December 2014; 18:00	3× (yellow card) 5× (suspension)	Report	2× (yellow card) 4× (suspension)	Arena Zagreb, Zagreb; Attendance: 1,300; Referees: Horváth, Márton (HUN)

16 December 2014; 20:15	Germany	24–24	France	Arena Zagreb, Zagreb; Attendance: 800; Referees: Stenrand, Birch (DEN)
16 December 2014; 20:15	Geschke 9	(13–10)	Baudouin, Dembélé 5	Arena Zagreb, Zagreb; Attendance: 800; Referees: Stenrand, Birch (DEN)
16 December 2014; 20:15	2× (yellow card) 2× (suspension)	Report	4× (yellow card) 2× (suspension)	Arena Zagreb, Zagreb; Attendance: 800; Referees: Stenrand, Birch (DEN)

17 December 2014; 15:45	Sweden	29–30	Montenegro	Arena Zagreb, Zagreb; Attendance: 1,000; Referees: Horváth, Márton (HUN)
17 December 2014; 15:45	Gulldén 9	(18–13)	Radičević 9	Arena Zagreb, Zagreb; Attendance: 1,000; Referees: Horváth, Márton (HUN)
17 December 2014; 15:45	3× (yellow card) 4× (suspension)	Report	3× (yellow card) 4× (suspension) 1× (red card)	Arena Zagreb, Zagreb; Attendance: 1,000; Referees: Horváth, Márton (HUN)

17 December 2014; 18:00	Germany	36–22	Slovakia	Arena Zagreb, Zagreb; Attendance: 600; Referees: Arntsen, Røen (NOR)
17 December 2014; 18:00	Huber, Lang 6	(17–10)	Dubajová 5	Arena Zagreb, Zagreb; Attendance: 600; Referees: Arntsen, Røen (NOR)
17 December 2014; 18:00	2× (yellow card) 2× (suspension)	Report	2× (yellow card) 3× (suspension)	Arena Zagreb, Zagreb; Attendance: 600; Referees: Arntsen, Røen (NOR)

17 December 2014; 20:15	Netherlands	18–20	France	Arena Zagreb, Zagreb; Attendance: 600; Referees: Opava, Válek (CZE)
17 December 2014; 20:15	Groot 10	(9–7)	three players 4	Arena Zagreb, Zagreb; Attendance: 600; Referees: Opava, Válek (CZE)
17 December 2014; 20:15	3× (yellow card) 5× (suspension)	Report	4× (yellow card) 6× (suspension)	Arena Zagreb, Zagreb; Attendance: 600; Referees: Opava, Válek (CZE)

== Knockout stage ==
=== Bracket ===
Semifinals
19 December
Norway	29
Sweden	25
19 December
Spain	19
Montenegro	18

Final
21 December
Norway	28
Spain	25
Third place game
21 December
Sweden	25
Montenegro	23

All times are local (UTC+1).

=== Semifinals ===
19 December 2014; 18:00	Montenegro	18–19	Spain	László Papp Budapest Sports Arena, Budapest; Attendance: 3,500; Referees: Brunovský, Čanda (SVK)
19 December 2014; 18:00	Radičević 6	(8–13)	Pinedo 5	László Papp Budapest Sports Arena, Budapest; Attendance: 3,500; Referees: Brunovský, Čanda (SVK)
19 December 2014; 18:00	3× (yellow card) 1× (suspension)	Report	1× (yellow card) 2× (suspension)	László Papp Budapest Sports Arena, Budapest; Attendance: 3,500; Referees: Brunovský, Čanda (SVK)

19 December 2014; 20:30	Norway	29–25	Sweden	László Papp Budapest Sports Arena, Budapest; Attendance: 3,500; Referees: Jurinović, Mrvica (CRO)
19 December 2014; 20:30	Løke 6	(13–11)	Gulldén 9	László Papp Budapest Sports Arena, Budapest; Attendance: 3,500; Referees: Jurinović, Mrvica (CRO)
19 December 2014; 20:30	2× (yellow card) 1× (suspension)	Report	3× (yellow card) 1× (suspension)	László Papp Budapest Sports Arena, Budapest; Attendance: 3,500; Referees: Jurinović, Mrvica (CRO)

=== Fifth place game ===
19 December 2014; 15:30	Hungary	25–26	France	László Papp Budapest Sports Arena, Budapest; Attendance: 3,500; Referees: Opava, Válek (CZE)
19 December 2014; 15:30	Triscsuk 10	(13–16)	Nze Minko 7	László Papp Budapest Sports Arena, Budapest; Attendance: 3,500; Referees: Opava, Válek (CZE)
19 December 2014; 15:30	3× (yellow card) 5× (suspension)	Report	4× (yellow card) 3× (suspension)	László Papp Budapest Sports Arena, Budapest; Attendance: 3,500; Referees: Opava, Válek (CZE)

=== Third place game ===
21 December 2014; 15:30	Sweden	25–23	Montenegro	László Papp Budapest Sports Arena, Budapest; Attendance: 5,500; Referees: Arntsen, Røen (NOR)
21 December 2014; 15:30	Gulldén 7	(11–12)	K. Bulatović 8	László Papp Budapest Sports Arena, Budapest; Attendance: 5,500; Referees: Arntsen, Røen (NOR)
21 December 2014; 15:30	2× (yellow card) 1× (suspension) 1× (red card)	Report	3× (yellow card) 5× (suspension)	László Papp Budapest Sports Arena, Budapest; Attendance: 5,500; Referees: Arntsen, Røen (NOR)

=== Final ===
21 December 2014; 18:00	Norway	28–25	Spain	László Papp Budapest Sports Arena, Budapest; Attendance: 7,500; Referees: Bonaventura, Bonaventura (FRA)
21 December 2014; 18:00	Riegelhuth Koren 10	(10–12)	Pena 10	László Papp Budapest Sports Arena, Budapest; Attendance: 7,500; Referees: Bonaventura, Bonaventura (FRA)
21 December 2014; 18:00	3× (yellow card) 4× (suspension)	Report	4× (yellow card) 5× (suspension)	László Papp Budapest Sports Arena, Budapest; Attendance: 7,500; Referees: Bonaventura, Bonaventura (FRA)

== Final ranking ==
Rank	Team
1st place, gold medalist(s)	Norway
2nd place, silver medalist(s)	Spain
3rd place, bronze medalist(s)	Sweden
4	Montenegro
5	France
6	Hungary
7	Netherlands
8	Denmark
9	Romania
10	Germany
11	Poland
12	Slovakia
13	Croatia
14	Russia
15	Serbia
16	Ukraine

Qualified for the 2015 World Championship
Qualified for the 2016 Summer Olympics
Qualified for the Olympic Qualification Tournament

Note: As Norway later qualified for the olympics as World Champions, the qualification slot went to the runner up instead and Montenegro qualified for the qualification tournament instead of Spain.

== Awards ==
The all-star team and awards were announced on 21 December 2014.

=== All-Star Team ===
- Goalkeeper: Silje Solberg (NOR)
- Right wing: Carmen Martín (ESP)
- Right back: Nora Mørk (NOR)
- Centre back: Kristina Kristiansen (DEN)
- Left back: Cristina Neagu (ROU)
- Left wing: Maria Fisker (DEN)
- Pivot: Heidi Løke (NOR)

=== Other awards ===
- Most Valuable Player: Isabelle Gulldén (SWE)
- Best Defensive Player: Sabina Jacobsen (SWE)

== Statistics ==
=== Top goalscorers ===
Rank	Name	Team	Goals	Shots	%
1	Isabelle Gulldén	Sweden	58	89	65%
2	Cristina Neagu	Romania	49	97	51%
3	Carmen Martín	Spain	46	65	71%
4	Katarina Bulatović	Montenegro	44	86	51%
5	Nora Mørk	Norway	41	69	59%
6	Krisztina Triscsuk	Hungary	39	53	74%
7	Nerea Pena	Spain	38	61	62%
8	Alexandra Lacrabère	France	37	73	51%
8	Heidi Løke	Norway	37	51	73%
10	Ida Odén	Sweden	36	58	62%

Source: SportResult.com

=== Top goalkeepers ===
Rank	Name	Team	%	Saves	Shots
1	Silje Solberg	Norway	41%	94	227
2	Paula Ungureanu	Romania	40%	80	198
3	Katja Schülke	Germany	39%	56	142
4	Éva Kiss	Hungary	38%	72	188
4	Sandra Toft	Denmark	38%	62	163
6	Amandine Leynaud	France	36%	56	157
6	Silvia Navarro	Spain	36%	89	247
8	Marina Vukčević	Montenegro	34%	21	62
8	Marta Žderić	Croatia	34%	27	80
10	Sonja Barjaktarović	Montenegro	33%	71	217

Source: SportResult.com
