= Julia Lönnborg =

Finnish handball player (born 1993)

Personal information
- Nationality: Finnish
- Born: 19 March 1993 (age 33) Stockholm, Sweden
- Height: 1.81 m (5 ft 11 in)

Sport
- Sport: Handball
- Position: Left Back
- Current club: Skuru IK
- Number: 9

Youth career
- Years: Team
- 2011-2012: Skuru IK

Senior clubs
- Years: Team
- 2012-2013: Skuru IK
- 2013-2015: Tyresö Handboll
- 2015-: Skuru IK
National team
- Years: Team
- 2014-: Finland
Medal record
Women's handball
Representing Finland

Julia Lönnborg (born 19 March 1993) is a Finnish handball player for Skuru IK and the Finnish national team.
