= Kathlen Ax =

Finnish handball player (born 1993)

Personal information
- Nationality: Finnish
- Born: 15 February 1993 (age 33) Helsinki, Finland
- Height: 1.64 m (5 ft 5 in)

Sport
- Sport: Handball
- Position: Right wing
- Current club: HIFK Handboll
- Number: 14

Senior clubs
- Years: Team
- 2009-: HIFK Handboll
National team
Years	Team	Apps	(Gls)
–	Finland	13	(7)
Medal record
Women's handball
Representing Finland

Kathlen Ax (born 15 February 1993) is a Finnish handball player for HIFK Handboll and the Finnish national team. Ax has played 13 matches for the Finnish national team and scored seven goals in them.
