= Luciana Popescu =

Romanian handball player (born 1988)

Luciana Marin
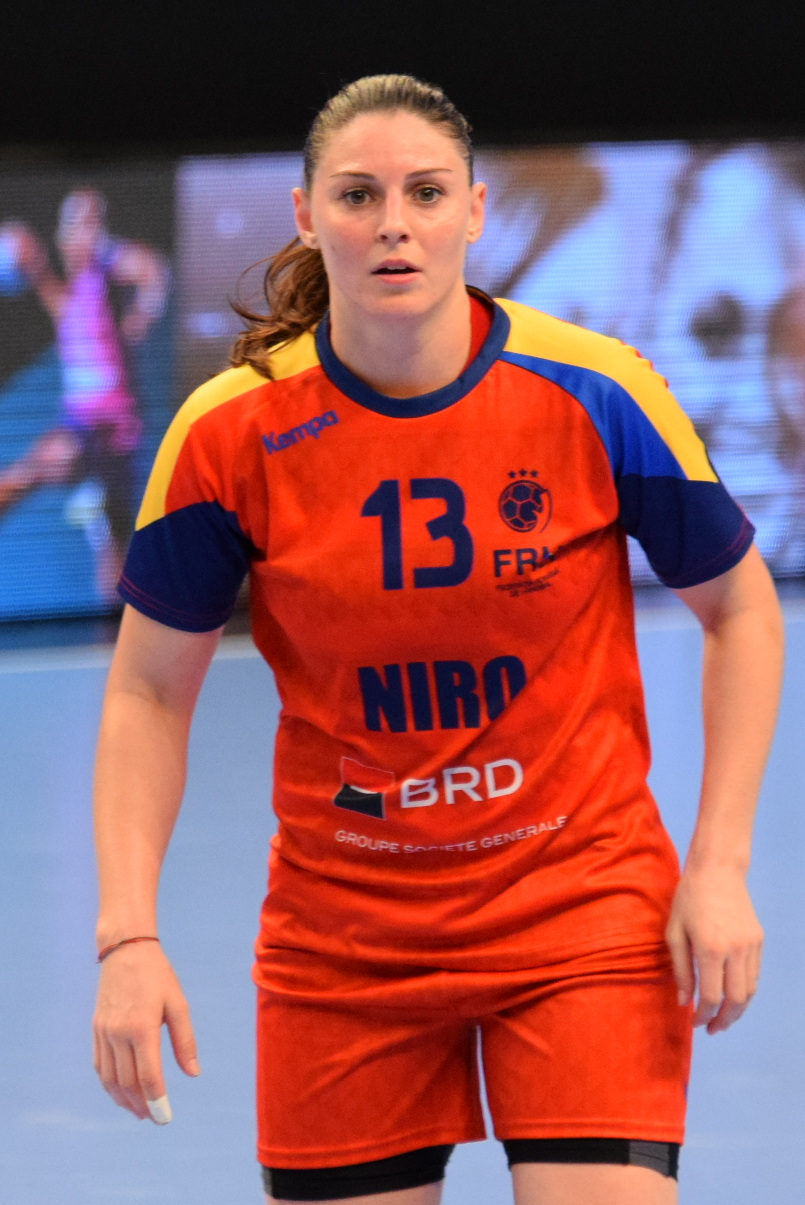
- November 29, 2015

Personal information
- Full name: Luciana-Andreea Popescu
- Nationality: Romanian
- Born: 13 October 1988 (age 38) Slatina, Romania
- Height: 1.76 m (5 ft 9 in)

Sport
- Sport: Handball
- Position: Centre back
- Current club: CS Minaur Baia Mare
- Number: 22

Youth career
- Years: Team
- –2008: LPS Slatina

Senior clubs
- Years: Team
- 2008–2009: KZN Slatina
- 2009–2013: Oltchim Râmnicu Vâlcea
- loan: → Știința Bacău
- loan: → HCM Roman
- 2013–2016: HCM Baia Mare
- 2016–2017: CSM Roman
- 2018–: Minaur Baia Mare
- –: CSM Slatina
National team
Years	Team	Apps	(Gls)
2012–	Romania	10	(15)
Medal record
World Championship
Bronze medal – third place	2015 Denmark

Luciana-Andreea Popescu (née Marin; born 13 October 1988) is a Romanian handballer who plays for CS Minaur Baia Mare.

== Achievements ==
- Liga Națională:
  - Winner: 2014
  - Finalist: 2015
- Cupa României:
  - Winner: 2014, 2015
- Supercupa României:
  - Winner: 2013, 2014, 2015
