= Robertina Mečevska =

Macedonian handball player (born 1984)

Personal information
- Full name: Robertina Mečevska
- Nationality: (North Macedonia) Macedonian
- Born: 16 November 1984 (age 41) Struga, Socialist Republic of Macedonia
- Height: 1.72 m (5 ft 8 in)

Sport
- Sport: Handball
- Position: Pivot
- Current club: (North Macedonia) ŽRK Vardar
- Number: 2
National team
Years	Team	Apps	(Gls)
–	(North Macedonia) Macedonia	68	(106)
- Updated on 6 June 2012

Robertina Mečevska (Macedonian: Робертина Мечевска; born 16 November 1984) is a retired Macedonian handball player who played for ŽRK Vardar and for the North Macedonia women's national handball team.

She plays on the position line player-pivot.

In the season 2010/11, playing for ŽRK Metalurg, she made it to the Last 16 of the Women's EHF Cup Winners' Cup.
