= Cristina Gheorghe =

Romanian-Italian handball player (born 1986)

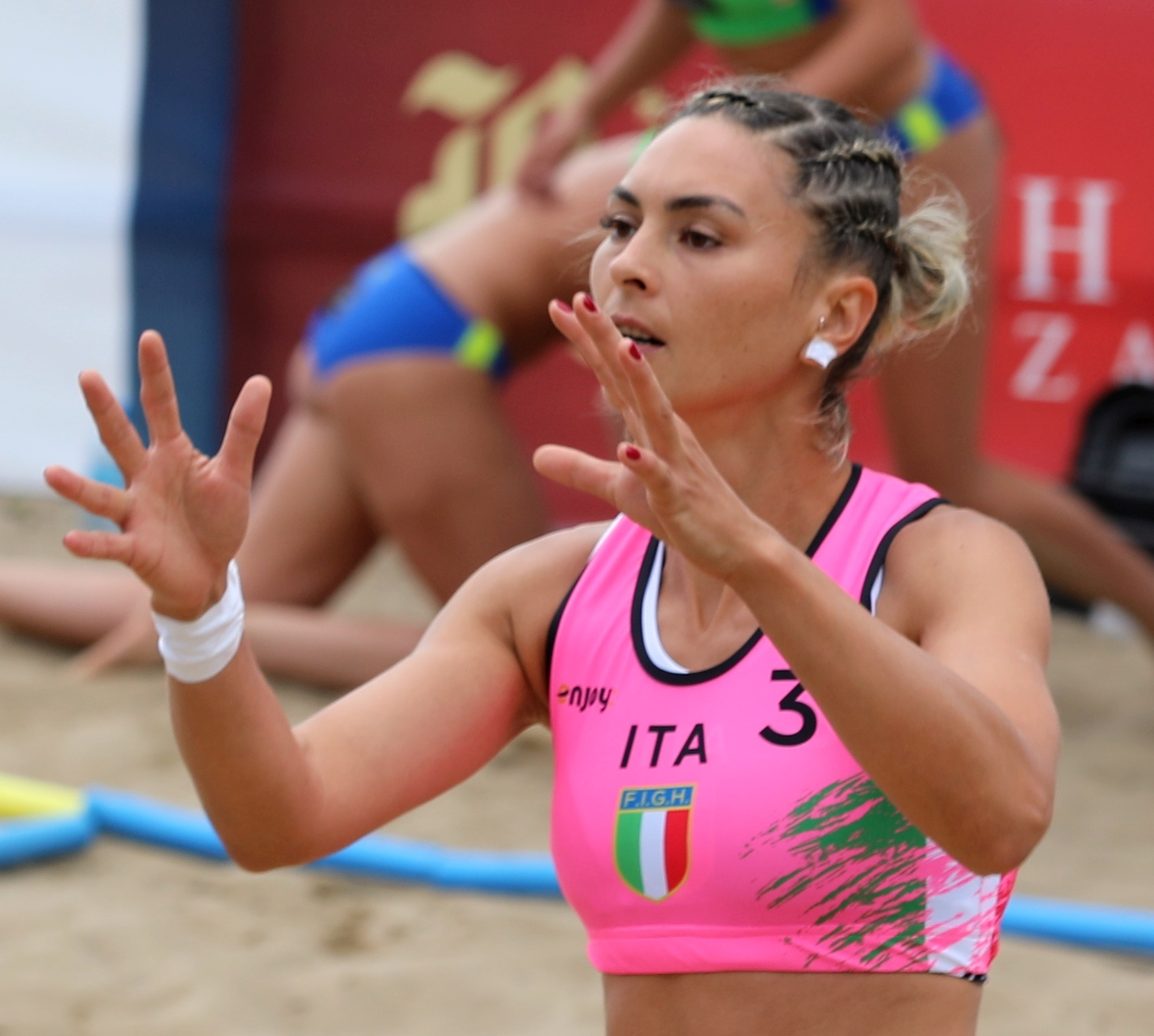

Personal information
- Full name: Cristina Viorica Gheorghe
- Nationality: Italian, Romanian
- Born: 24 April 1986 (age 40) Slobozia, Romania
- Height: 1.82 m (6 ft 0 in)

Sport
- Sport: Handball
- Position: Right Back
- Current club: HC Dunărea Brăila
- Number: 3

Senior clubs
- Years: Team
- 2010–2012: ASD HC Sassari
- 2012–2016: Esercito Roma
- 2016-: HC Dunărea Brăila
National team
- Years: Team
- –: Italy

Cristina Viorica Gheorghe (born 24 April 1986 in Slobozia) is a Romanian-born Italian handballer who plays for Romanian club HC Dunărea Brăila and the Italian national team.

She was the best goal-scorer of Italy in the 2014 European Women's Handball Championship qualification. The Italian national team did not manage to qualify but Gheorghe played in all six matches and scored a total of 32 goals.

== Achievements ==
- Coppa Italia:
  - Winner: 2011
