= Petra Beňušková =

Slovak handball player (born 1980)

Petra Beňušková II
Personal information
- Nationality: Slovak
- Born: 31 October 1980 (age 45) Partizánske, Czechoslovakia
- Height: 1.70 m (5 ft 7 in)

Sport
- Sport: Handball
- Position: Centre back
- Current club: Stella St-Maur Handball
National team
Years	Team	Apps	(Gls)
–	Slovakia	75	(210)

Petra Beňušková is a Slovak former handball player, who played for Stella St-Maur Handball and the Slovak national team.
