= Linda Cainberg =

Finnish handball player (born 1986)

Personal information
- Nationality: Finnish
- Born: 10 July 1986 (age 40) Vantaa, Finland
- Height: 1.76 m (5 ft 9 in)

Sport
- Sport: Handball
- Position: Left Back
- Current club: HIFK Handboll
- Number: 18

Senior clubs
- Years: Team
- 2006-: HIFK Handboll
National team
- Years: Team
- –: Finland
Medal record
Women's handball
Representing Finland

Linda Cainberg (born 10 July 1986) is a Finnish handball player for HIFK Handboll and the Finnish national team. Cainberg has played a record 61 matches for the Finnish national team, scoring 123 goals.
