= Laima Bernatavičiūtė =

Lithuanian handball player (born 1985)

Personal information
- Full name: Laima Bernatavičiūtė
- Nationality: Lithuanian
- Born: 12 April 1985 (age 41) Kaunas, Lithuanian SSR, Soviet Union
- Height: 1.81 m (5 ft 11 in)

Sport
- Sport: Handball
- Position: Left Back

Senior clubs
- Years: Team
- –2007: Egle Vilnius
- 2007–2010: Alcoa FKC
- 2010–2011: CB Mar Alicante
- 2011–2012: CJF Fleury Loiret HB
- 2012–2014: Volda Handball
- 2014–2015: Stella Saint-Maur Handball
National team
- Years: Team
- –: Lithuania

Laima Bernatavičiūtė (born 12 April 1985) is a former Lithuanian handballer who was member of the Lithuanian national team.

She signed to Egle Vilnius at the age of 15 and spent seven years with the Lithuanian record champions. In 2007, she switched to Hungarian side Alcoa FKC, where she joined fellow handball player Sonata Vijūnaitė. After three years, with 72 league matches under her belt, in which she scored 320 goals, she moved to CB Mar Alicante, with them she has won the silver medal of the EHF Cup Winners' Cup in 2011. Following this success, she changed her residence again and joined CJF Fleury Loiret HB in the French championship.

== Achievements ==
- EHF Cup Winners' Cup:
  - Finalist: 2011

== Awards and recognition ==
- World University Championship Top Scorer: 2006
- MVP of the World University Championship: 2006
- Lithuanian Championship Top Scorer: 2007
