= Karen Knútsdóttir =

Icelandic handball player (born 1990)

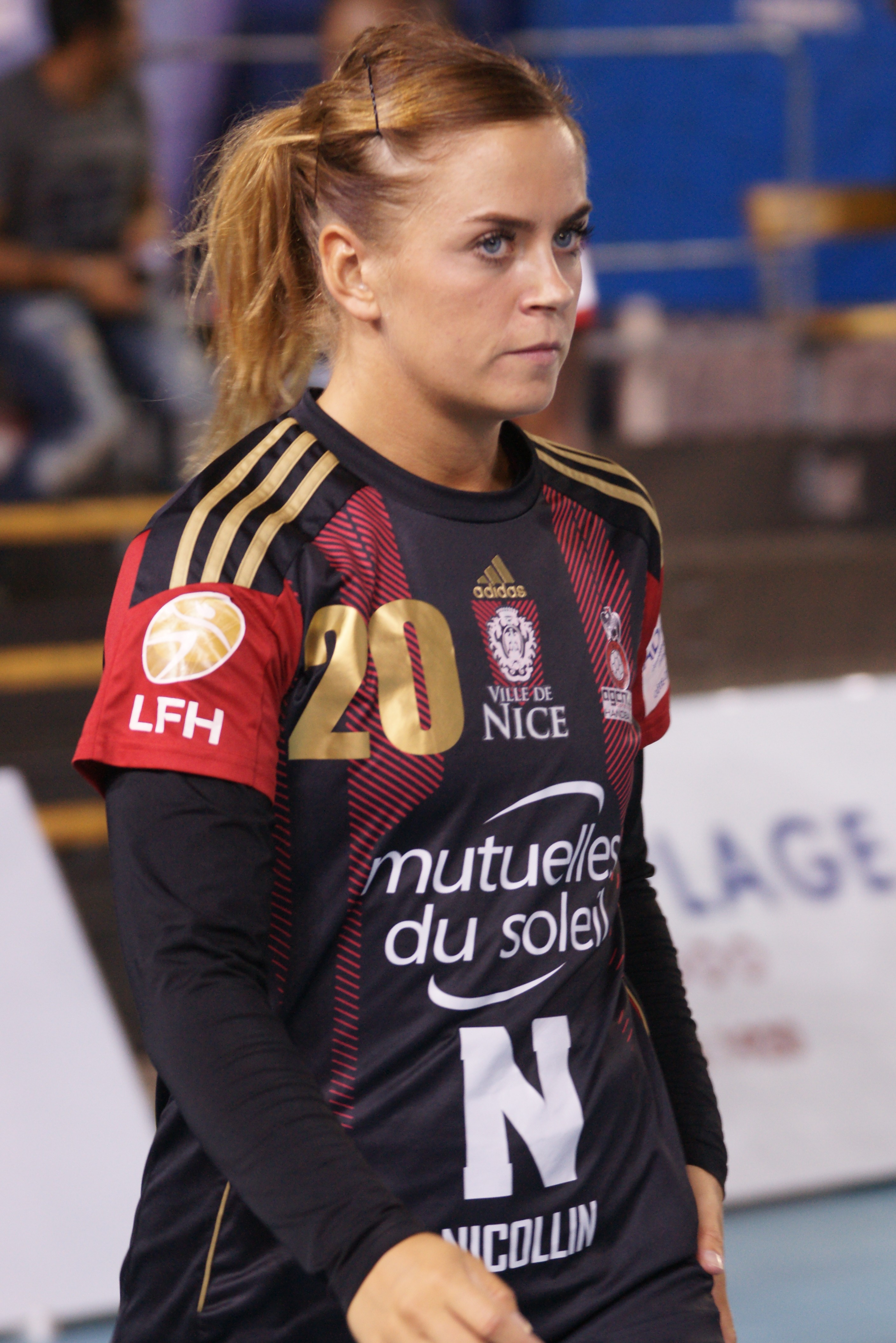

Personal information
- Nationality: Icelandic
- Born: 4 February 1990 (age 36) Reykjavík, Iceland
- Height: 1.68 m (5 ft 6 in)

Sport
- Sport: Handball
- Position: Central back

Senior clubs
- Years: Team
- 2008-2011: Fram
- 2011-2013: HSG Blomberg-Lippe
- 2013-2014: SønderjyskE Håndbold
- 2014-2017: OGC Nice Handball
- 2017-2025: Fram
National team
Years	Team	Apps	(Gls)
–	Iceland	106	(371)
- Updated on 3 November 2024

Karen Knútsdóttir (born 4 February 1990) is an Icelandic former handballer who played as a middle back. She won the Icelandic championship twice and the Iceland Cup four times.

== Club career ==
In Iceland, Karen played here whole career with Fram. On April 26, 2018, Karen won her first national championship with Fram.

Outside of Iceland she played for Blomberg-Lippe in Germany, SønderjyskE in Denmark and Nice in France.

In March 2025, she announced her retirement from handball.

== National team career ==
She appeared in 106 games for the Icelandic national team, scoring 371 goals.

== Trophies ==
- Icelandic Champions:
  - 2018, 2022
- Icelandic Cup:
  - 2010, 2011, 2018, 2020
- League champions:
  - 2019, 2020, 2022
- Icelandic League Cup:
  - 2010
