= Beate Scheffknecht =

Austrian handball player (born 1990)

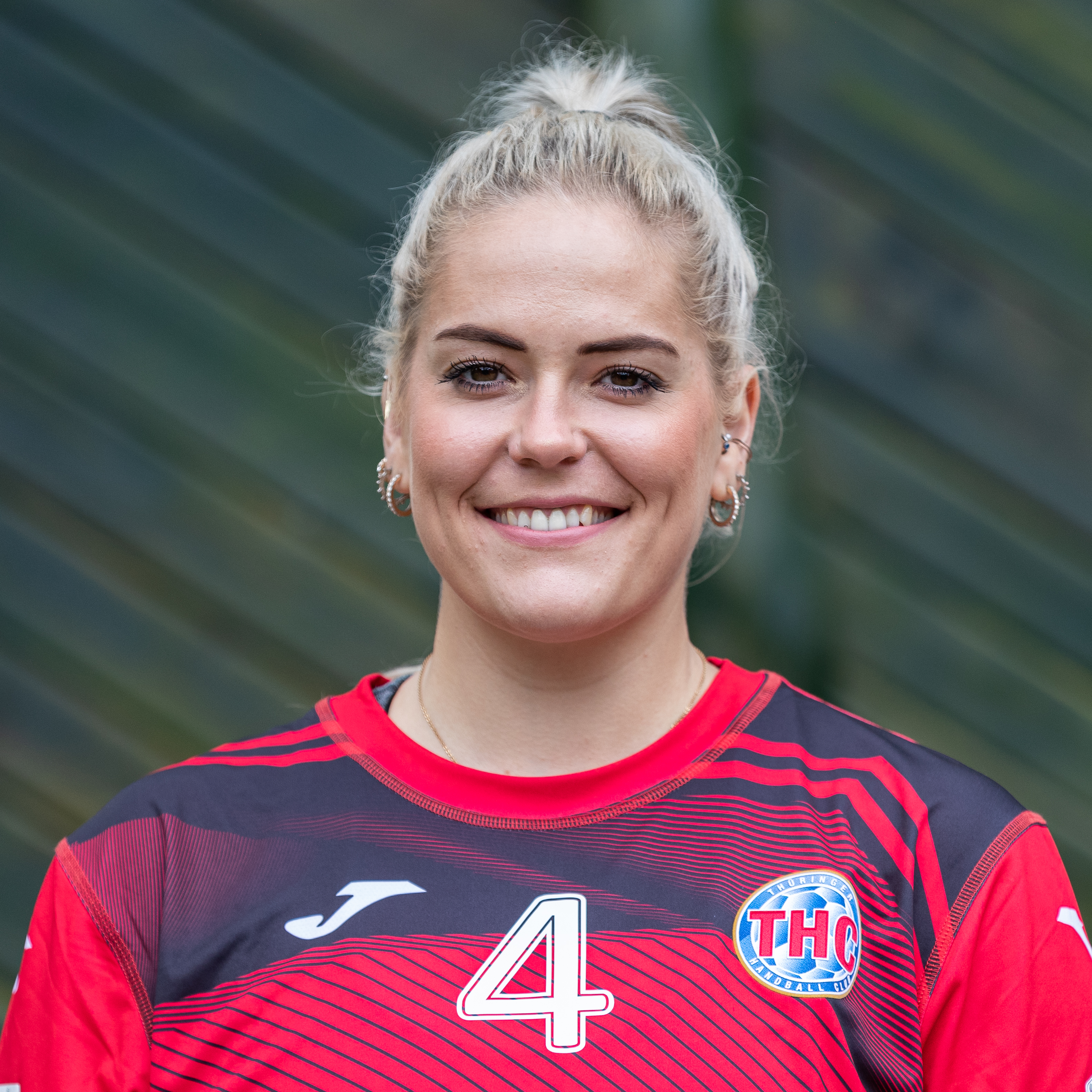

Personal information
- Nationality: Austrian
- Born: 27 February 1990 (age 36) Innsbruck, Austria
- Height: 1.80 m (5 ft 11 in)

Sport
- Sport: Handball
- Position: Left back
- Current club: Thüringer HC
- Number: 4

Senior clubs
- Years: Team
- 2000–2008: SSV Dorbirn Schoren
- 2008–2009: 1. FC Nürnberg
- 2009–2011: SG BBM Bietigheim
- 2011–2015: Frisch Auf Göppingen
- 2015–: Thüringer HC
National team
Years	Team	Apps	(Gls)
2007-	Austria	95	(406)

Beate Scheffknecht (born 27 February 1990) is an Austrian handballer who plays for Thüringer HC and the Austria national team.

== Achievements ==
- Bundesliga:
  - Winner: 2016
- DHB-Supercup:
  - Winner: 2016
