= Paule Baudouin =

French handball player (born 1984)

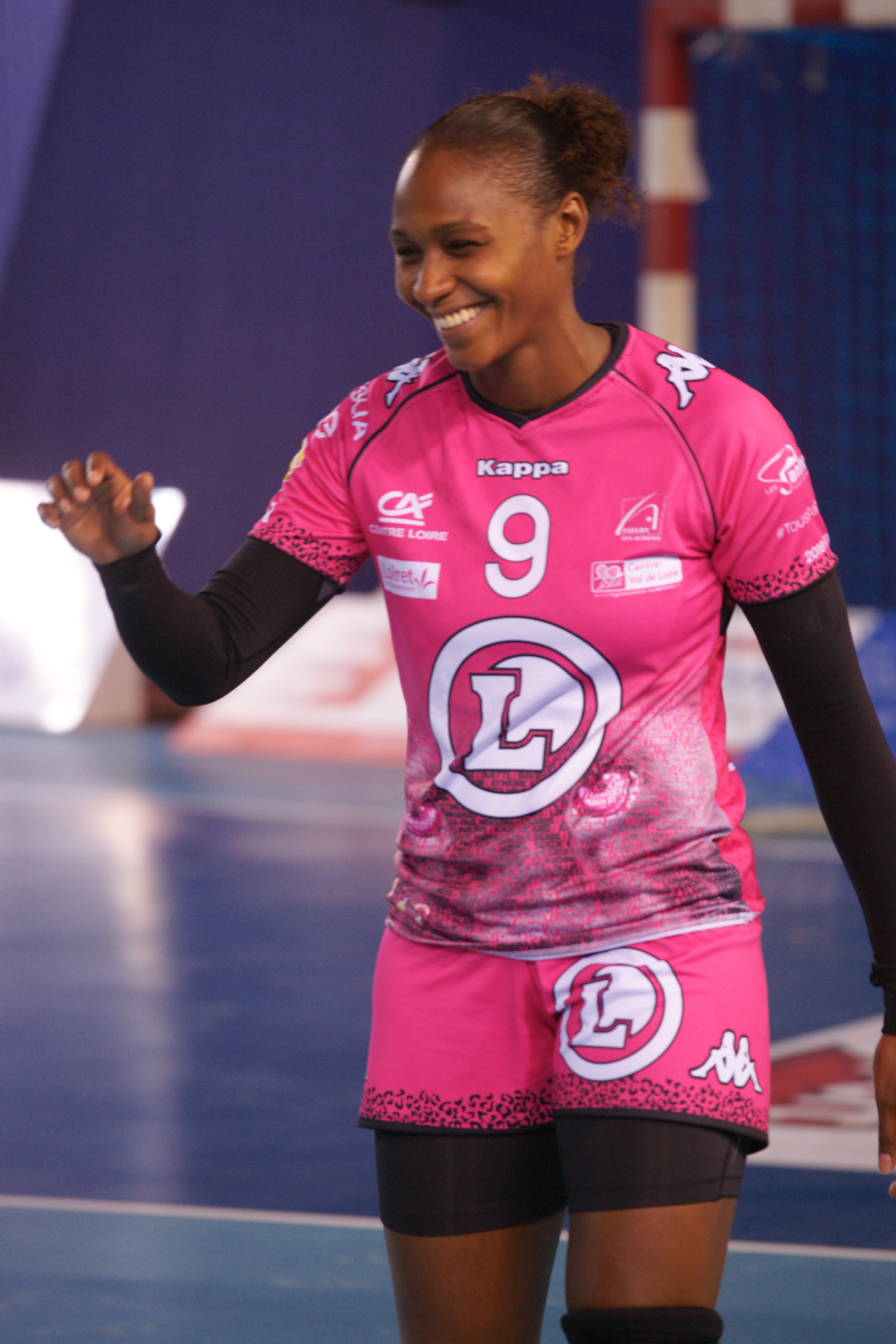

Personal information
- Nationality: French
- Born: 25 October 1984 (age 41) Saint Denis, France
- Height: 1.72 m (5 ft 8 in)

Sport
- Sport: Handball
- Position: Left wing
- Current club: Fleury Loiret HB
- Number: 9

Senior clubs
- Years: Team
- 2003-2006: Le Havre
- 2006-2008: Issy-Paris Hand
- 2008-2010: Team Esbjerg
- 2010-2011: Mios Biganos-Bègles
- 2011-2012: Le Havre
- 2012-2015: Metz Handball
- 2015-2016: SG BBM Bietigheim
- 2016-2018: Fleury Loiret HB
- 2018-2020: Nantes Loire Atlantique Handball
National team
Years	Team	Apps	(Gls)
2004–	France	201	(605)

Teams managed
- 2020-: Noisy-le-Grand Handball (youth)
Medal record
World Championship
Silver medal – second place	2009 China	Team
Silver medal – second place	2011 Brazil	Team
European Championship
Bronze medal – third place	2006 Sweden	Team
Mediterranean Games
Gold medal – first place	2009 Pescara	Team

Paule Baudouin (born 25 October 1984) is a French former handball player, who played for the French national team. She was born in Saint Denis.

She made her debut on the French national team in 2004. She competed at the 2006 European Championship in Sweden, where the French team placed third and at the 2008 Summer Olympics in Beijing, where the French team finished fifth, and at the 2012 Summer Olympics in London where the team finished fifth again.

== Biography ==
For the 2012–2013 season, she left Le Havre AC (handball) for Metz. Her first season in Lorraine was a resounding success, both personally—winning the award for best left wing in the league and the title of top scorer in the regular season with 125 goals and as part of the team. Metz Handball won the French Cup and league double and also reached the EHF Cup final, losing by a single goal to the Danish team TTH Holstebro.

During the 2013–2014 season, following their victory in the League Cup against Fleury, she extended her contract with Metz for two more years. Her season ended with another French championship title after a victory in the final against Issy Paris 92 Hand.

As a key player for Metz, with whom she qualified for the main round of the 2014–2015 Champions League, she was selected to compete in the 2014 European Championship in Hungary and Croatia. A member of the national team since 2004, she is, along with Nina Kamto Njitam, the most experienced player on a rejuvenated squad. France ultimately finished 5th in the competition.

After seeing very little playing time under Jérémy Roussel starting in the 2015–2016 season, she reached an agreement with the club to terminate her contract in October 2015 and thus left Metz after three seasons. She immediately signed with SG BBM Bietigheim.

She returned to France the following season, joining Fleury Loiret HB and replacing Manon Houette at left wing.

After two seasons with Fleury, she joined Nantes Handball Féminin in 2018, where she was reunited with her former coach from Le Havre, Frédéric Bougeant.
