= Simona Szarková =

Slovak handball player (born 1992)

Personal information
- Nationality: Slovak
- Born: 2 January 1992 (age 34) Nové Zámky, Czechoslovakia
- Height: 1.74 m (5 ft 9 in)

Sport
- Sport: Handball
- Position: Right back
- Current club: DHK Baník Most
- Number: 21

Senior clubs
- Years: Team
- –: HK Slovan Duslo Šaľa
- –2018: DHK Baník Most
- 2018: Storhamar HE
- 2018–2021: Mosonmagyaróvári KC SE
- 2021–2022: Siófok KC
- 2022–2023: Kisvárdai KC
- 2023–: Zagłębie Lubin
National team
| Years | Team | Apps | (Gls) |
| – | Slovakia | 22 | (54) |

Simona Szarková (born 2 January 1992) is a Slovak handballer who plays for Polish club Zagłębie Lubin and the Slovak national team.
