= Hana Kvášová =

Czech handball player

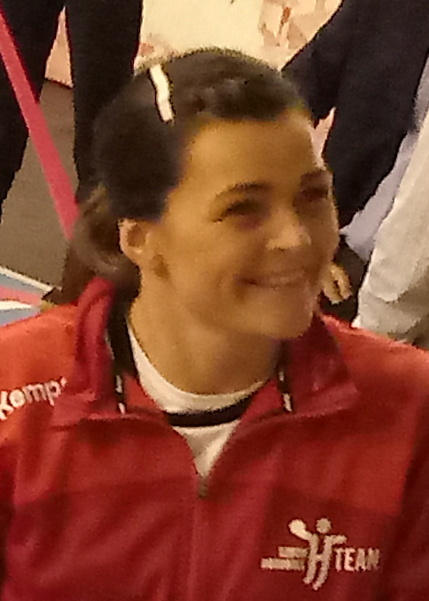

Personal information
- Nationality: Czech
- Born: 28 September 1989 (age 37) Havlíčkův Brod, Czechoslovakia
- Height: 1.78 m (5 ft 10 in)

Sport
- Sport: Handball
- Position: Left back
- Current club: Sambre Avesnois Handball
National team
Years	Team	Apps	(Gls)
–	Czech Republic	82	(143)

Hana Kvášová (born 28 September 1989) is a Czech handball player for Sambre Avesnois Handball and the Czech national team.

She represented the Czech Republic at the 2020 European Women's Handball Championship.
