= Viktoriya Borshchenko =

Ukrainian handball player

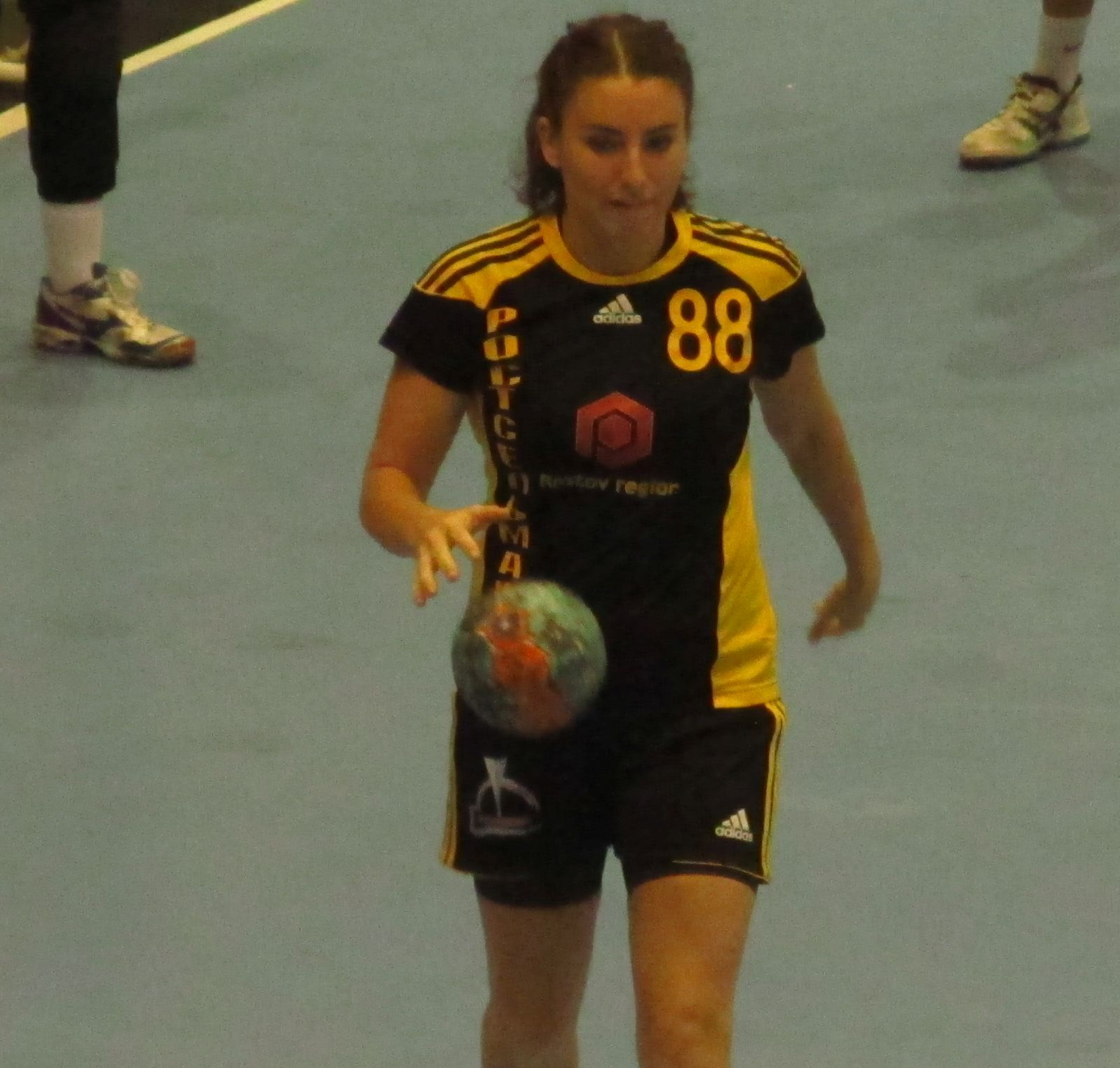

Personal information
- Nationality: Ukrainian
- Born: 5 January 1986 (age 40) Kherson, Ukraine
- Height: 1.72 m (5 ft 8 in)

Sport
- Sport: Handball
- Position: Left wing
National team
Years	Team	Apps	(Gls)
–	Ukraine	46	(154)

Viktoriya Borshchenko (born Ukrainian: Вікторія Борщенко; 5 January 1986) is a Ukrainian handballer player for the Ukrainian national team. She moved to Rostov-Don in June 2013.
