= Zorica Despodovska =

Macedonian handball player

Personal information
- Full name: Zorica Despodovska
- Nationality: Macedonian
- Born: 20 December 1991 (age 34) Skopje, Republic of Macedonia
- Height: 1.81 m (5 ft 11 in)

Sport
- Sport: Handball
- Position: Left Back
- Current club: KPR Kobierzyce
- Number: 55
National team
Years	Team	Apps	(Gls)
2012–	Macedonia	11	(28)
- Updated on 6 June 2012

Zorica Despodovska (Macedonian: Зорица Десподовска) (born 20 December 1991 in Skopje, Republic of Macedonia) is a Macedonian handball player who plays for KPR Kobierzyce and for the North Macedonia women's national handball team. She plays on the position left back.
