= Finland women's national handball team =

Women's national handball team representing Finland

Finland

Information
- Association: Finnish Handball Association (Suomen Käsipalloliitto)
- Coach: Tomas Westerlund
- Most caps: Linda Cainberg (61)

Colours
1st	2nd

Results

Summer Olympics
- Appearances: 0

World Championship
- Appearances: 0

European Championship
- Appearances: 0
- Last updated on Unknown.

The Finland women's national handball team is the national team of Finland. It takes part in international team handball competitions.

The team has yet to participate in a European or World championship.

== EHF Challenge Trophy ==
- 1st: 2008, 2010
- 3rd: 2000, 2004
