= 2020 European Women's Handball Championship qualification =

This article describes the qualification for the 2020 European Women's Handball Championship.

The qualification was cancelled due to the COVID-19 pandemic.

== Qualification system ==
31 teams registered for participation and competed for 14 places at the final tournament in two distinct Qualification Phases. The group winner of phase 1 advanced to phase 2. The 28 teams were divided into seven groups of four teams.

== Qualification Phase 1 ==
The group was played in a tournament format from 31 May to 2 June 2019. The group winner advanced to the second phase.

All times are local.

=== Standings ===
Pos	Team	Pld	W	D	L	GF	GA	GD	Pts	Qualification
1	Greece (H)	3	3	0	0	86	49	+37	6	Qualification phase 2
2	Israel	3	1	1	1	80	78	+2	3	
3	Luxembourg	3	1	0	2	65	84	−19	2	
4	Finland	3	0	1	2	64	84	−20	1	

Source: Eurohandball
Rules for classification: 1) points; 2) head-to-head points; 3) head-to-head goal difference; 4) head-to-head number of goals scored; 5) goal difference.
(H) Hosts

=== Results ===
31 May 2019; 16:00	Finland	24–27	Luxembourg	Filippio Sports Hall, Veria; Attendance: 200; Referees: Mitrović, Kažanegra (MNE)
31 May 2019; 16:00	Hilli 7	(13–18)	Welter 8	Filippio Sports Hall, Veria; Attendance: 200; Referees: Mitrović, Kažanegra (MNE)
31 May 2019; 16:00	2× (yellow card) 4× (suspension)	Report	1× (yellow card) 2× (suspension)	Filippio Sports Hall, Veria; Attendance: 200; Referees: Mitrović, Kažanegra (MNE)

31 May 2019; 18:30	Israel	21–28	Greece	Filippio Sports Hall, Veria; Attendance: 500; Referees: Rakytina, Tkachuk (UKR)
31 May 2019; 18:30	Vakrat 6	(12–11)	Tsàkalou 8	Filippio Sports Hall, Veria; Attendance: 500; Referees: Rakytina, Tkachuk (UKR)
31 May 2019; 18:30	1× (yellow card) 6× (suspension)	Report	2× (yellow card) 2× (suspension)	Filippio Sports Hall, Veria; Attendance: 500; Referees: Rakytina, Tkachuk (UKR)

1 June 2019; 16:00	Luxembourg	24–33	Israel	Filippio Sports Hall, Veria; Attendance: 200; Referees: Rakytina, Tkachuk (UKR)
1 June 2019; 16:00	Wirtz 10	(9–17)	Vakrat 10	Filippio Sports Hall, Veria; Attendance: 200; Referees: Rakytina, Tkachuk (UKR)
1 June 2019; 16:00	2× (yellow card) 3× (suspension)	Report	3× (yellow card) 2× (suspension)	Filippio Sports Hall, Veria; Attendance: 200; Referees: Rakytina, Tkachuk (UKR)

1 June 2019; 18:00	Greece	31–14	Finland	Filippio Sports Hall, Veria; Attendance: 750; Referees: Mitrović, Kažanegra (MNE)
1 June 2019; 18:00	Tsàkalou 6	(17–6)	Kulju 3	Filippio Sports Hall, Veria; Attendance: 750; Referees: Mitrović, Kažanegra (MNE)
1 June 2019; 18:00	5× (suspension)	Report	1× (yellow card) 3× (suspension)	Filippio Sports Hall, Veria; Attendance: 750; Referees: Mitrović, Kažanegra (MNE)

2 June 2019; 15:00	Israel	26–26	Finland	Filippio Sports Hall, Veria; Attendance: 150; Referees: Mitrović, Kažanegra (MNE)
2 June 2019; 15:00	Vakrat 12	(17–10)	Lindholm 7	Filippio Sports Hall, Veria; Attendance: 150; Referees: Mitrović, Kažanegra (MNE)
2 June 2019; 15:00	1× (yellow card) 4× (suspension)	Report	2× (yellow card) 3× (suspension)	Filippio Sports Hall, Veria; Attendance: 150; Referees: Mitrović, Kažanegra (MNE)

2 June 2019; 17:30	Greece	27–14	Luxembourg	Filippio Sports Hall, Veria; Attendance: 600; Referees: Rakytina, Tkachuk (UKR)
2 June 2019; 17:30	Mournou, Tsàkalou 5	(14–5)	Wirtz 5	Filippio Sports Hall, Veria; Attendance: 600; Referees: Rakytina, Tkachuk (UKR)
2 June 2019; 17:30	5× (suspension) 1× (red card)	Report	2× (yellow card) 5× (suspension)	Filippio Sports Hall, Veria; Attendance: 600; Referees: Rakytina, Tkachuk (UKR)

== Qualification Phase 2 ==
The groups would have been played in a home and away round-robin format from September 2019 to May 2020. The top two teams would have been qualified for the main tournament.

The draw was held on 4 April 2019.

The European Handball Federation announced on 13 March 2020 that the matches from 25 to 29 March would not be held as scheduled due to the ongoing developments in the spread of COVID-19 across Europe.

On 25 March, the EHF announced that no matches would be played before June due to the coronavirus pandemic. The rounds 3 to 6 would have been played in a single venue in one week. Those rounds were cancelled on 24 April 2020.

=== Seeding ===
Pot 1	Pot 2	Pot 3	Pot 4
France; Netherlands; Russia; Sweden; Romania; Montenegro; Germany	Serbia; Czech Republic; Hungary; Spain; Slovenia; Poland; Croatia	Austria; Belarus; Slovakia; Turkey; North Macedonia; Ukraine; Italy	Switzerland; Iceland; Portugal; Lithuania; Faroe Islands; Kosovo; Greece

All times are local.

=== Group 1 ===
Pos	Team	Pld	W	D	L	GF	GA	GD	Pts
1	Netherlands	2	2	0	0	75	42	+33	4
2	Spain	2	2	0	0	61	40	+21	4
3	Austria	2	0	0	2	46	60	−14	0
4	Greece	2	0	0	2	36	76	−40	0

Updated to match(es) played on 29 September 2019. Source: Eurohandball
Rules for classification: 1) points; 2) head-to-head points; 3) head-to-head goal difference; 4) head-to-head number of goals scored; 5) goal difference.

26 September 2019; 19:30	Netherlands	32–24	Austria	Indoor-Sportcentrum Eindhoven, Eindhoven; Attendance: 5,000; Referees: Stokes, Bartlett (GBR)
26 September 2019; 19:30	Dulfer, van Wetering 6	(13–13)	Frey 8	Indoor-Sportcentrum Eindhoven, Eindhoven; Attendance: 5,000; Referees: Stokes, Bartlett (GBR)
26 September 2019; 19:30	2× (yellow card) 2× (suspension)	Report	1× (yellow card) 5× (suspension)	Indoor-Sportcentrum Eindhoven, Eindhoven; Attendance: 5,000; Referees: Stokes, Bartlett (GBR)

26 September 2019; 20:30	Spain	33–18	Greece	Palacio de los Juegos del Mediterráneo, Almería; Attendance: 3,310; Referees: Rauchs, Linster (LUX)
26 September 2019; 20:30	Cabral 6	(15–9)	Mastaka 5	Palacio de los Juegos del Mediterráneo, Almería; Attendance: 3,310; Referees: Rauchs, Linster (LUX)
26 September 2019; 20:30	2× (yellow card) 3× (suspension)	Report	2× (suspension)	Palacio de los Juegos del Mediterráneo, Almería; Attendance: 3,310; Referees: Rauchs, Linster (LUX)

29 September 2019; 17:00	Greece	18–43	Netherlands	Municipal Sports Center Lefkovrisi, Kozani; Attendance: 700; Referees: Simone, Monitillo (ITA)
29 September 2019; 17:00	Tsàkalou 9	(13–21)	three players 5	Municipal Sports Center Lefkovrisi, Kozani; Attendance: 700; Referees: Simone, Monitillo (ITA)
29 September 2019; 17:00	1× (yellow card) 3× (suspension)	Report	2× (yellow card) 2× (suspension)	Municipal Sports Center Lefkovrisi, Kozani; Attendance: 700; Referees: Simone, Monitillo (ITA)

29 September 2019; 20:25	Austria	22–28	Spain	BSFZ Südstadt, Maria Enzersdorf; Attendance: 800; Referees: Lončar, Lončar (CRO)
29 September 2019; 20:25	Frey, Kovacs 7	(8–14)	Rodríguez 6	BSFZ Südstadt, Maria Enzersdorf; Attendance: 800; Referees: Lončar, Lončar (CRO)
29 September 2019; 20:25	1× (yellow card) 2× (suspension)	Report	1× (yellow card) 4× (suspension)	BSFZ Südstadt, Maria Enzersdorf; Attendance: 800; Referees: Lončar, Lončar (CRO)

Spain	Cancelled	Netherlands

Greece	Cancelled	Austria

Austria	Cancelled	Greece

Netherlands	Cancelled	Spain

Greece	Cancelled	Spain

Austria	Cancelled	Netherlands

Spain	Cancelled	Austria

Netherlands	Cancelled	Greece

=== Group 2 ===
Pos	Team	Pld	W	D	L	GF	GA	GD	Pts
1	Hungary	2	2	0	0	63	29	+34	4
2	Montenegro	2	2	0	0	73	41	+32	4
3	Lithuania	2	0	0	2	43	65	−22	0
4	Italy	2	0	0	2	27	71	−44	0

Updated to match(es) played on 29 September 2019. Source: Eurohandball
Rules for classification: 1) points; 2) head-to-head points; 3) head-to-head goal difference; 4) head-to-head number of goals scored; 5) goal difference.

25 September 2019; 18:00	Montenegro	41–17	Italy	Sportski Centar Ada, Pljevlja; Attendance: 2,360; Referees: Mertinian, Syrepisios (GRE)
25 September 2019; 18:00	Radičević 9	(20–9)	Manojlovic 5	Sportski Centar Ada, Pljevlja; Attendance: 2,360; Referees: Mertinian, Syrepisios (GRE)
25 September 2019; 18:00	2× (yellow card) 4× (suspension)	Report	2× (yellow card) 3× (suspension)	Sportski Centar Ada, Pljevlja; Attendance: 2,360; Referees: Mertinian, Syrepisios (GRE)

25 September 2019; 19:00	Hungary	33–19	Lithuania	Érd Aréna, Érd; Attendance: 1,900; Referees: Harabagiu, Stănescu (ROU)
25 September 2019; 19:00	Klujber 9	(16–12)	Kavaliauskaitė 9	Érd Aréna, Érd; Attendance: 1,900; Referees: Harabagiu, Stănescu (ROU)
25 September 2019; 19:00	3× (yellow card) 6× (suspension)	Report	3× (yellow card) 5× (suspension)	Érd Aréna, Érd; Attendance: 1,900; Referees: Harabagiu, Stănescu (ROU)

29 September 2019; 16:00	Lithuania	24–32	Montenegro	Švyturys Arena, Klaipėda; Attendance: 500; Referees: Pétursson, Prastarson (ISL)
29 September 2019; 16:00	Kavaliauskaitė 11	(14–20)	Jauković 9	Švyturys Arena, Klaipėda; Attendance: 500; Referees: Pétursson, Prastarson (ISL)
29 September 2019; 16:00	2× (yellow card) 4× (suspension)	Report	3× (yellow card) 6× (suspension) 1× (red card)	Švyturys Arena, Klaipėda; Attendance: 500; Referees: Pétursson, Prastarson (ISL)

29 September 2019; 17:00	Italy	10–30	Hungary	Palagetur, Lignano Sabbiadoro; Attendance: 800; Referees: Beulakker, Gilis (BEL)
29 September 2019; 17:00	Bassanese 3	(4–16)	Klujber 8	Palagetur, Lignano Sabbiadoro; Attendance: 800; Referees: Beulakker, Gilis (BEL)
29 September 2019; 17:00	1× (yellow card) 5× (suspension)	Report	1× (yellow card) 1× (suspension)	Palagetur, Lignano Sabbiadoro; Attendance: 800; Referees: Beulakker, Gilis (BEL)

Hungary	Cancelled	Montenegro

Lithuania	Cancelled	Italy

Montenegro	Cancelled	Hungary

Italy	Cancelled	Lithuania

Lithuania	Cancelled	Hungary

Italy	Cancelled	Montenegro

Montenegro	Cancelled	Lithuania

Hungary	Cancelled	Italy

=== Group 3 ===
Pos	Team	Pld	W	D	L	GF	GA	GD	Pts
1	Germany	2	2	0	0	74	45	+29	4
2	Slovenia	2	2	0	0	63	52	+11	4
3	Belarus	2	0	0	2	59	71	−12	0
4	Kosovo	2	0	0	2	38	66	−28	0

Updated to match(es) played on 29 September 2019. Source: Eurohandball
Rules for classification: 1) points; 2) head-to-head points; 3) head-to-head goal difference; 4) head-to-head number of goals scored; 5) goal difference.

25 September 2019; 18:45	Germany	40–30	Belarus	HUK-Coburg arena, Coburg; Attendance: 1,837; Referees: Sá, Sá (POR)
25 September 2019; 18:45	Bölk, Naidzinavicius 6	(20–14)	Kotsina 7	HUK-Coburg arena, Coburg; Attendance: 1,837; Referees: Sá, Sá (POR)
25 September 2019; 18:45	2× (yellow card) 5× (suspension)	Report	2× (yellow card) 3× (suspension)	HUK-Coburg arena, Coburg; Attendance: 1,837; Referees: Sá, Sá (POR)

26 September 2019; 18:00	Slovenia	32–23	Kosovo	Sportna Dvorana Ljudski Vrt Lukna, Maribor; Attendance: 600; Referees: Duplii, Tkachuk (UKR)
26 September 2019; 18:00	Pišek, Vučko 6	(16–10)	Arifi 8	Sportna Dvorana Ljudski Vrt Lukna, Maribor; Attendance: 600; Referees: Duplii, Tkachuk (UKR)
26 September 2019; 18:00	2× (yellow card) 3× (suspension)	Report	1× (yellow card) 4× (suspension)	Sportna Dvorana Ljudski Vrt Lukna, Maribor; Attendance: 600; Referees: Duplii, Tkachuk (UKR)

29 September 2019; 15:30	Belarus	29–31	Slovenia	Minsk Sports Palace, Minsk; Attendance: 2,000; Referees: Ivanović, Vujisić (MNE)
29 September 2019; 15:30	Yezhykava 7	(13–18)	Gros 11	Minsk Sports Palace, Minsk; Attendance: 2,000; Referees: Ivanović, Vujisić (MNE)
29 September 2019; 15:30	2× (yellow card) 3× (suspension)	Report	2× (yellow card) 3× (suspension)	Minsk Sports Palace, Minsk; Attendance: 2,000; Referees: Ivanović, Vujisić (MNE)

29 September 2019; 20:00	Kosovo	15–34	Germany	Palace of Youth and Sports, Pristina; Attendance: 755; Referees: Jovchev, Yonchev (BUL)
29 September 2019; 20:00	Demaj 10	(8–14)	Minevskaja 7	Palace of Youth and Sports, Pristina; Attendance: 755; Referees: Jovchev, Yonchev (BUL)
29 September 2019; 20:00	1× (yellow card) 5× (suspension)	Report	3× (yellow card) 3× (suspension)	Palace of Youth and Sports, Pristina; Attendance: 755; Referees: Jovchev, Yonchev (BUL)

Slovenia	Cancelled	Germany

Kosovo	Cancelled	Belarus

Belarus	Cancelled	Kosovo

Germany	Cancelled	Slovenia

Belarus	Cancelled	Germany

Kosovo	Cancelled	Slovenia

Germany	Cancelled	Kosovo

Slovenia	Cancelled	Belarus

=== Group 4 ===
Pos	Team	Pld	W	D	L	GF	GA	GD	Pts
1	Russia	2	2	0	0	69	41	+28	4
2	Serbia	2	2	0	0	62	49	+13	4
3	Slovakia	2	0	0	2	41	61	−20	0
4	Switzerland	2	0	0	2	49	70	−21	0

Updated to match(es) played on 29 September 2019. Source: Eurohandball
Rules for classification: 1) points; 2) head-to-head points; 3) head-to-head goal difference; 4) head-to-head number of goals scored; 5) goal difference.

25 September 2019; 18:00	Serbia	35–23	Switzerland	Kraljevo Sports Hall, Kraljevo; Attendance: 2,000; Referees: Backović, Palačković (SLO)
25 September 2019; 18:00	Pop-Lazić 7	(17–11)	Frey, Hodel 5	Kraljevo Sports Hall, Kraljevo; Attendance: 2,000; Referees: Backović, Palačković (SLO)
25 September 2019; 18:00	1× (yellow card) 3× (suspension)	Report	3× (yellow card) 4× (suspension)	Kraljevo Sports Hall, Kraljevo; Attendance: 2,000; Referees: Backović, Palačković (SLO)

25 September 2019; 19:30	Russia	34–15	Slovakia	Rostov-on-Don Palace of Sports, Rostov-Don; Attendance: 2,956; Referees: Praštalo, Balvan (BIH)
25 September 2019; 19:30	Vyakhireva 8	(17–10)	M. Rajnohová 5	Rostov-on-Don Palace of Sports, Rostov-Don; Attendance: 2,956; Referees: Praštalo, Balvan (BIH)
25 September 2019; 19:30	2× (yellow card) 1× (suspension)	Report	2× (yellow card) 1× (suspension)	Rostov-on-Don Palace of Sports, Rostov-Don; Attendance: 2,956; Referees: Praštalo, Balvan (BIH)

29 September 2019; 17:00	Switzerland	26–35	Russia	Mobiliar Arena, Muri bei Bern; Attendance: 934; Referees: Bozhinovski, Nachevski (MKD)
29 September 2019; 17:00	Kündig 7	(13–15)	Vyakhireva 7	Mobiliar Arena, Muri bei Bern; Attendance: 934; Referees: Bozhinovski, Nachevski (MKD)
29 September 2019; 17:00	1× (yellow card) 8× (suspension) 1× (red card)	Report	2× (yellow card) 6× (suspension)	Mobiliar Arena, Muri bei Bern; Attendance: 934; Referees: Bozhinovski, Nachevski (MKD)

29 September 2019; 17:00	Slovakia	26–27	Serbia	Športová hala na Zábraní, Hlohovec; Attendance: 1,184; Referees: Doychinov, Goretsov (BUL)
29 September 2019; 17:00	Bíziková 11	(11–10)	Pop-Lazić, Stoiljković 7	Športová hala na Zábraní, Hlohovec; Attendance: 1,184; Referees: Doychinov, Goretsov (BUL)
29 September 2019; 17:00	2× (yellow card) 5× (suspension)	Report	2× (yellow card) 2× (suspension)	Športová hala na Zábraní, Hlohovec; Attendance: 1,184; Referees: Doychinov, Goretsov (BUL)

Serbia	Cancelled	Russia

Switzerland	Cancelled	Slovakia

Russia	Cancelled	Serbia

Slovakia	Cancelled	Switzerland

Slovakia	Cancelled	Russia

Switzerland	Cancelled	Serbia

Serbia	Cancelled	Slovakia

Russia	Cancelled	Switzerland

=== Group 5 ===
Pos	Team	Pld	W	D	L	GF	GA	GD	Pts
1	Sweden	2	2	0	0	73	45	+28	4
2	Czech Republic	2	2	0	0	68	49	+19	4
3	North Macedonia	2	0	0	2	55	72	−17	0
4	Portugal	2	0	0	2	39	69	−30	0

Updated to match(es) played on 28 September 2019. Source: Eurohandball
Rules for classification: 1) points; 2) head-to-head points; 3) head-to-head goal difference; 4) head-to-head number of goals scored; 5) goal difference.

25 September 2019; 20:15	Czech Republic	31–20	Portugal	Sportovní hala UP, Olomouc; Attendance: 700; Referees: Loshak, Shajbakov (UKR)
25 September 2019; 20:15	three players 5	(13–11)	Ferreira, Resende 4	Sportovní hala UP, Olomouc; Attendance: 700; Referees: Loshak, Shajbakov (UKR)
25 September 2019; 20:15	2× (yellow card) 3× (suspension)	Report	2× (yellow card) 5× (suspension)	Sportovní hala UP, Olomouc; Attendance: 700; Referees: Loshak, Shajbakov (UKR)

26 September 2019; 19:00	Sweden	35–26	North Macedonia	Rosvalla Nyköping Eventcenter, Nyköping; Attendance: 1,815; Referees: Kull, Tint (EST)
26 September 2019; 19:00	Petrén 7	(20–13)	Ristovska 5	Rosvalla Nyköping Eventcenter, Nyköping; Attendance: 1,815; Referees: Kull, Tint (EST)
26 September 2019; 19:00	2× (yellow card) 2× (suspension)	Report	1× (yellow card) 2× (suspension)	Rosvalla Nyköping Eventcenter, Nyköping; Attendance: 1,815; Referees: Kull, Tint (EST)

28 September 2019; 16:30	Portugal	19–38	Sweden	Câmara Municipal de Tondela, Tondela; Attendance: 900; Referees: Fremstad, Pedersen (NOR)
28 September 2019; 16:30	Ferreira, Resende 4	(7–15)	Hagman, Lundström 5	Câmara Municipal de Tondela, Tondela; Attendance: 900; Referees: Fremstad, Pedersen (NOR)
28 September 2019; 16:30	1× (yellow card) 3× (suspension)	Report	1× (yellow card) 6× (suspension)	Câmara Municipal de Tondela, Tondela; Attendance: 900; Referees: Fremstad, Pedersen (NOR)

28 September 2019; 18:00	North Macedonia	29–37	Czech Republic	Boris Trajkovski Sports Center, Skopje; Attendance: 500; Referees: Bytyqi, Kasapi (KOS)
28 September 2019; 18:00	Livrinikj 12	(14–14)	Korešová 11	Boris Trajkovski Sports Center, Skopje; Attendance: 500; Referees: Bytyqi, Kasapi (KOS)
28 September 2019; 18:00	3× (yellow card) 2× (suspension)	Report	2× (yellow card) 3× (suspension)	Boris Trajkovski Sports Center, Skopje; Attendance: 500; Referees: Bytyqi, Kasapi (KOS)

Czech Republic	Cancelled	Sweden

Portugal	Cancelled	North Macedonia

Sweden	Cancelled	Czech Republic

North Macedonia	Cancelled	Portugal

North Macedonia	Cancelled	Sweden

Portugal	Cancelled	Czech Republic

Sweden	Cancelled	Portugal

Czech Republic	Cancelled	North Macedonia

=== Group 6 ===
Pos	Team	Pld	W	D	L	GF	GA	GD	Pts
1	Croatia	2	2	0	0	59	29	+30	4
2	France	2	2	0	0	61	34	+27	4
3	Iceland	2	0	0	2	25	52	−27	0
4	Turkey	2	0	0	2	38	68	−30	0

Updated to match(es) played on 29 September 2019. Source: Eurohandball
Rules for classification: 1) points; 2) head-to-head points; 3) head-to-head goal difference; 4) head-to-head number of goals scored; 5) goal difference.

25 September 2019; 18:00	Croatia	29–8	Iceland	Gradski vrt Hall, Osijek; Attendance: 1,500; Referees: Chrzan, Janas (POL)
25 September 2019; 18:00	Ježić, Zadravec 6	(14–3)	Knútsdóttir 5	Gradski vrt Hall, Osijek; Attendance: 1,500; Referees: Chrzan, Janas (POL)
25 September 2019; 18:00	2× (yellow card)	Report	4× (suspension)	Gradski vrt Hall, Osijek; Attendance: 1,500; Referees: Chrzan, Janas (POL)

25 September 2019; 20:00	France	38–17	Turkey	Coliséum, Amiens; Attendance: 2,700; Referees: Weijmans, Wolbertus (NED)
25 September 2019; 20:00	Bouquet 6	(15–9)	Karaçam, Yılmaz 3	Coliséum, Amiens; Attendance: 2,700; Referees: Weijmans, Wolbertus (NED)
25 September 2019; 20:00	2× (yellow card) 2× (suspension)	Report	1× (yellow card) 4× (suspension)	Coliséum, Amiens; Attendance: 2,700; Referees: Weijmans, Wolbertus (NED)

29 September 2019; 16:00	Iceland	17–23	France	Íþróttamiðstöð Hauka, Hafnarfjörður; Attendance: 901; Referees: Nygaard, Pedersen (DEN)
29 September 2019; 16:00	Knútsdóttir 6	(10–13)	Niombla 5	Íþróttamiðstöð Hauka, Hafnarfjörður; Attendance: 901; Referees: Nygaard, Pedersen (DEN)
29 September 2019; 16:00	1× (yellow card)	Report	2× (yellow card)	Íþróttamiðstöð Hauka, Hafnarfjörður; Attendance: 901; Referees: Nygaard, Pedersen (DEN)

29 September 2019; 18:00	Turkey	21–30	Croatia	Porsuk Spor Salonu, Odunpazarı; Attendance: 1,300; Referees: Xhema, Jahja (KOS)
29 September 2019; 18:00	Toprak 4	(8–16)	Blažević 8	Porsuk Spor Salonu, Odunpazarı; Attendance: 1,300; Referees: Xhema, Jahja (KOS)
29 September 2019; 18:00	2× (yellow card) 7× (suspension)	Report	1× (yellow card) 5× (suspension)	Porsuk Spor Salonu, Odunpazarı; Attendance: 1,300; Referees: Xhema, Jahja (KOS)

Croatia	Cancelled	France

Iceland	Cancelled	Turkey

France	Cancelled	Croatia

Turkey	Cancelled	Iceland

Turkey	Cancelled	France

Iceland	Cancelled	Croatia

France	Cancelled	Iceland

Croatia	Cancelled	Turkey

=== Group 7 ===
Pos	Team	Pld	W	D	L	GF	GA	GD	Pts
1	Poland	2	2	0	0	55	42	+13	4
2	Romania	2	2	0	0	52	44	+8	4
3	Ukraine	2	0	0	2	50	54	−4	0
4	Faroe Islands	2	0	0	2	36	53	−17	0

Updated to match(es) played on 29 September 2019. Source: Eurohandball
Rules for classification: 1) points; 2) head-to-head points; 3) head-to-head goal difference; 4) head-to-head number of goals scored; 5) goal difference.

25 September 2019; 18:30	Romania	27–24	Ukraine	Sala Sporturilor „Dumitru Popescu Colibași”, Brașov; Attendance: 2,700; Referees: Panayides, Andreou (CYP)
25 September 2019; 18:30	Laslo 8	(15–12)	Perederiy 8	Sala Sporturilor „Dumitru Popescu Colibași”, Brașov; Attendance: 2,700; Referees: Panayides, Andreou (CYP)
25 September 2019; 18:30	3× (yellow card) 3× (suspension)	Report	3× (yellow card) 4× (suspension)	Sala Sporturilor „Dumitru Popescu Colibași”, Brașov; Attendance: 2,700; Referees: Panayides, Andreou (CYP)

25 September 2019; 20:30	Poland	28–16	Faroe Islands	Kompleks Widowisko-Sportowy KCSiR, Kwidzyn; Attendance: 1,500; Referees: Butskevich, Butskevich (BLR)
25 September 2019; 20:30	Kobylińska 7	(12–8)	Weyhe 4	Kompleks Widowisko-Sportowy KCSiR, Kwidzyn; Attendance: 1,500; Referees: Butskevich, Butskevich (BLR)
25 September 2019; 20:30	3× (yellow card) 1× (suspension)	Report	1× (yellow card) 3× (suspension)	Kompleks Widowisko-Sportowy KCSiR, Kwidzyn; Attendance: 1,500; Referees: Butskevich, Butskevich (BLR)

28 September 2019; 19:00	Ukraine	26–27	Poland	Palace of Sports, Kyiv; Attendance: 2,200; Referees: Pandžić, Mošorinski (SER)
28 September 2019; 19:00	Savchyn 9	(14–14)	Kudłacz-Gloc 7	Palace of Sports, Kyiv; Attendance: 2,200; Referees: Pandžić, Mošorinski (SER)
28 September 2019; 19:00	2× (yellow card) 3× (suspension)	Report	3× (yellow card) 1× (suspension)	Palace of Sports, Kyiv; Attendance: 2,200; Referees: Pandžić, Mošorinski (SER)

29 September 2019; 17:00	Faroe Islands	20–25	Romania	Høllin á Hálsi, Tórshavn; Attendance: 635; Referees: Smailagic, Smailagic (SWE)
29 September 2019; 17:00	Hansen, Weyhe 5	(12–11)	Buceschi 6	Høllin á Hálsi, Tórshavn; Attendance: 635; Referees: Smailagic, Smailagic (SWE)
29 September 2019; 17:00	1× (yellow card) 2× (suspension)	Report	1× (yellow card) 4× (suspension)	Høllin á Hálsi, Tórshavn; Attendance: 635; Referees: Smailagic, Smailagic (SWE)

Poland	Cancelled	Romania

Faroe Islands	Cancelled	Ukraine

Ukraine	Cancelled	Faroe Islands

Romania	Cancelled	Poland

Faroe Islands	Cancelled	Poland

Ukraine	Cancelled	Romania

Poland	Cancelled	Ukraine

Romania	Cancelled	Faroe Islands
