= 2021 World Women's Handball Championship – European qualification =

The European qualification for the 2021 World Women's Handball Championship, in Spain, was played over two rounds.

In the first round of qualification, 17 teams who were not participating at the 2020 European Championship were split into two groups of four and three groups of three teams. The top two teams of each group advanced to the second phase, where the teams joined the remaining 10 teams from the European Championship and played play-off games to determine the qualified teams.

== Qualification phase 1 ==
=== Seeding ===
The draw was held on 8 July 2020 in Vienna, Austria. The top two teams of each group advance to the play-off round. Each group will play their matches in a mini-tournament at a pre-selected location.

Pot 1	Pot 2	Pot 3	Pot 4
Austria; Belarus; Slovakia; Turkey; North Macedonia	Ukraine; Italy; Switzerland; Iceland; Portugal	Lithuania; Faroe Islands; Kosovo; Israel; Finland	Greece; Luxembourg

On 13 November 2020, the EHF decided to postpone the matches, scheduled for December 2020, to March 2021 due to the COVID-19 pandemic.

All times are UTC+1.

=== Group 1 ===
Pos	Team	Pld	W	D	L	GF	GA	GD	Pts	Qualification
1	Slovakia	3	3	0	0	105	64	+41	6	Qualification phase 2
2	Ukraine	3	2	0	1	87	76	+11	4	Qualification phase 2
3	Israel	3	1	0	2	65	86	−21	2	
4	Luxembourg (H)	3	0	0	3	56	87	−31	0	

Source: EHF
Rules for classification: 1) points; 2) head-to-head points; 3) head-to-head goal difference; 4) head-to-head number of goals scored; 5) goal difference.
(H) Hosts

19 March 2021; 17:00	Slovakia	31–28	Ukraine	d'Coque, Luxembourg City; Attendance: 0 (Note: The match was played behind closed doors due to the COVID-19 pandemic.); Referees: Kijauskaitė, Žalienė (LTU)
19 March 2021; 17:00	R. Bíziková, Szarková 7	(14–13)	Smolinh 9	d'Coque, Luxembourg City; Attendance: 0 Referees: Kijauskaitė, Žalienė (LTU)
19 March 2021; 17:00	1× (yellow card) 4× (suspension)	Report	2× (yellow card) 5× (suspension)	d'Coque, Luxembourg City; Attendance: 0 Referees: Kijauskaitė, Žalienė (LTU)

19 March 2021; 19:30	Israel	22–18	Luxembourg	d'Coque, Luxembourg City; Attendance: 0 Referees: Fahner, Kubis (POL)
19 March 2021; 19:30	Vakrat 6	(11–6)	J. Wirtz 5	d'Coque, Luxembourg City; Attendance: 0 Referees: Fahner, Kubis (POL)
19 March 2021; 19:30	5× (suspension)	Report	1× (yellow card) 5× (suspension)	d'Coque, Luxembourg City; Attendance: 0 Referees: Fahner, Kubis (POL)

20 March 2021; 15:30	Slovakia	37–19	Israel	d'Coque, Luxembourg City; Attendance: 0 Referees: Fahner, Kubis (POL)
20 March 2021; 15:30	Lancz 10	(18–11)	Vakrat 5	d'Coque, Luxembourg City; Attendance: 0 Referees: Fahner, Kubis (POL)
20 March 2021; 15:30	1× (yellow card) 4× (suspension)	Report	5× (suspension)	d'Coque, Luxembourg City; Attendance: 0 Referees: Fahner, Kubis (POL)

20 March 2021; 18:00	Ukraine	28–21	Luxembourg	d'Coque, Luxembourg City; Attendance: 0 Referees: Kijauskaitė, Žalienė (LTU)
20 March 2021; 18:00	Smolinh 8	(14–12)	Welter 5	d'Coque, Luxembourg City; Attendance: 0 Referees: Kijauskaitė, Žalienė (LTU)
20 March 2021; 18:00	6× (suspension)	Report	2× (yellow card) 5× (suspension)	d'Coque, Luxembourg City; Attendance: 0 Referees: Kijauskaitė, Žalienė (LTU)

21 March 2021; 15:30	Ukraine	31–24	Israel	d'Coque, Luxembourg City; Attendance: 0 Referees: Fahner, Kubis (POL)
21 March 2021; 15:30	Volovnyk 7	(16–10)	Vakrat 8	d'Coque, Luxembourg City; Attendance: 0 Referees: Fahner, Kubis (POL)
21 March 2021; 15:30	2× (yellow card) 3× (suspension)	Report	3× (yellow card) 3× (suspension)	d'Coque, Luxembourg City; Attendance: 0 Referees: Fahner, Kubis (POL)

21 March 2021; 18:00	Luxembourg	17–37	Slovakia	d'Coque, Luxembourg City; Attendance: 0 Referees: Kijauskaitė, Žalienė (LTU)
21 March 2021; 18:00	Welter 4	(10–16)	Patrnčiaková 7	d'Coque, Luxembourg City; Attendance: 0 Referees: Kijauskaitė, Žalienė (LTU)
21 March 2021; 18:00	1× (yellow card) 5× (suspension)	Report	2× (yellow card) 4× (suspension)	d'Coque, Luxembourg City; Attendance: 0 Referees: Kijauskaitė, Žalienė (LTU)

=== Group 2 ===
Pos	Team	Pld	W	D	L	GF	GA	GD	Pts	Qualification
1	North Macedonia (H)	3	3	0	0	75	57	+18	6	Qualification phase 2
2	Iceland	3	2	0	1	81	66	+15	4	Qualification phase 2
3	Lithuania	3	1	0	2	71	90	−19	2	
4	Greece	3	0	0	3	64	78	−14	0	

Source: EHF
Rules for classification: 1) points; 2) head-to-head points; 3) head-to-head goal difference; 4) head-to-head number of goals scored; 5) goal difference.
(H) Hosts

19 March 2021; 17:45	North Macedonia	24–17	Iceland	Jane Sandanski Arena, Skopje; Attendance: 0 Referees: Ciulei, Stoia (ROU)
19 March 2021; 17:45	Ristovska 11	(11–8)	three players 3	Jane Sandanski Arena, Skopje; Attendance: 0 Referees: Ciulei, Stoia (ROU)
19 March 2021; 17:45		Report	1× (yellow card) 2× (suspension)	Jane Sandanski Arena, Skopje; Attendance: 0 Referees: Ciulei, Stoia (ROU)

19 March 2021; 19:45	Lithuania	27–26	Greece	Jane Sandanski Arena, Skopje; Attendance: 0 Referees: Ivanović, Vujisić (MNE)
19 March 2021; 19:45	Šponė 6	(12–12)	Zygoura 7	Jane Sandanski Arena, Skopje; Attendance: 0 Referees: Ivanović, Vujisić (MNE)
19 March 2021; 19:45	2× (yellow card) 2× (suspension)	Report	1× (yellow card) 6× (suspension)	Jane Sandanski Arena, Skopje; Attendance: 0 Referees: Ivanović, Vujisić (MNE)

20 March 2021; 17:45	North Macedonia	31–21	Lithuania	Jane Sandanski Arena, Skopje; Attendance: 0 Referees: Ivanović, Vujisić (MNE)
20 March 2021; 17:45	Ristovska 8	(15–12)	Sparnauskaitė 5	Jane Sandanski Arena, Skopje; Attendance: 0 Referees: Ivanović, Vujisić (MNE)
20 March 2021; 17:45	2× (yellow card) 6× (suspension) 1× (red card)	Report	2× (yellow card) 4× (suspension)	Jane Sandanski Arena, Skopje; Attendance: 0 Referees: Ivanović, Vujisić (MNE)

20 March 2021; 19:45	Iceland	31–19	Greece	Jane Sandanski Arena, Skopje; Attendance: 0 Referees: Ciulei, Stoia (ROU)
20 March 2021; 19:45	R. Jónsdóttir 7	(15–7)	Chatziparasidou 4	Jane Sandanski Arena, Skopje; Attendance: 0 Referees: Ciulei, Stoia (ROU)
20 March 2021; 19:45	3× (yellow card) 2× (suspension)	Report	3× (yellow card) 1× (suspension)	Jane Sandanski Arena, Skopje; Attendance: 0 Referees: Ciulei, Stoia (ROU)

21 March 2021; 17:45	Greece	19–20	North Macedonia	Jane Sandanski Arena, Skopje; Attendance: 0 Referees: Ciulei, Stoia (ROU)
21 March 2021; 17:45	Chatziparasidou 6	(13–10)	Ristovska 10	Jane Sandanski Arena, Skopje; Attendance: 0 Referees: Ciulei, Stoia (ROU)
21 March 2021; 17:45	1× (yellow card) 1× (suspension)	Report	1× (yellow card) 3× (suspension)	Jane Sandanski Arena, Skopje; Attendance: 0 Referees: Ciulei, Stoia (ROU)

21 March 2021; 19:45	Iceland	33–23	Lithuania	Jane Sandanski Arena, Skopje; Attendance: 0 Referees: Ivanović, Vujisić (MNE)
21 March 2021; 19:45	Thompson 7	(19–9)	Repečkaitė 8	Jane Sandanski Arena, Skopje; Attendance: 0 Referees: Ivanović, Vujisić (MNE)
21 March 2021; 19:45	2× (yellow card) 7× (suspension)	Report	1× (yellow card) 4× (suspension)	Jane Sandanski Arena, Skopje; Attendance: 0 Referees: Ivanović, Vujisić (MNE)

=== Group 3 ===
Pos	Team	Pld	W	D	L	GF	GA	GD	Pts	Qualification
1	Turkey	0	0	0	0	0	0	0	0	Qualification phase 2
2	Portugal	0	0	0	0	0	0	0	0	Qualification phase 2
3	Finland (Note: Finland withdrew before the competition.)	0	0	0	0	0	0	0	0	Withdrawn

Source: EHF
Rules for classification: 1) points; 2) head-to-head points; 3) head-to-head goal difference; 4) head-to-head number of goals scored; 5) goal difference.

=== Group 4 ===
Pos	Team	Pld	W	D	L	GF	GA	GD	Pts	Qualification
1	Austria (H)	2	2	0	0	63	42	+21	4	Qualification phase 2
2	Italy	2	1	0	1	46	59	−13	2	Qualification phase 2
3	Kosovo	2	0	0	2	42	50	−8	0	

Source: EHF
Rules for classification: 1) points; 2) head-to-head points; 3) head-to-head goal difference; 4) head-to-head number of goals scored; 5) goal difference.
(H) Hosts

19 March 2021; 18:10	Kosovo	20–26	Austria	BSFZ Südstadt, Maria Enzersdorf; Attendance: 0 Referees: Cipov, Klus (SVK)
19 March 2021; 18:10	Gjikokaj 6	(12–11)	Reichert 9	BSFZ Südstadt, Maria Enzersdorf; Attendance: 0 Referees: Cipov, Klus (SVK)
19 March 2021; 18:10	2× (yellow card) 6× (suspension)	Report	1× (yellow card) 4× (suspension)	BSFZ Südstadt, Maria Enzersdorf; Attendance: 0 Referees: Cipov, Klus (SVK)

20 March 2021; 18:00	Italy	24–22	Kosovo	BSFZ Südstadt, Maria Enzersdorf; Attendance: 0 Referees: Cipov, Klus (SVK)
20 March 2021; 18:00	three players 5	(11–10)	Kameri 6	BSFZ Südstadt, Maria Enzersdorf; Attendance: 0 Referees: Cipov, Klus (SVK)
20 March 2021; 18:00	2× (yellow card) 7× (suspension)	Report	1× (yellow card) 3× (suspension)	BSFZ Südstadt, Maria Enzersdorf; Attendance: 0 Referees: Cipov, Klus (SVK)

21 March 2021; 16:30	Austria	37–22	Italy	BSFZ Südstadt, Maria Enzersdorf; Attendance: 0 Referees: Cipov, Klus (SVK)
21 March 2021; 16:30	Reichert 10	(20–8)	Del Balzo, Djiogap 6	BSFZ Südstadt, Maria Enzersdorf; Attendance: 0 Referees: Cipov, Klus (SVK)
21 March 2021; 16:30	1× (yellow card) 3× (suspension)	Report	51× (suspension)	BSFZ Südstadt, Maria Enzersdorf; Attendance: 0 Referees: Cipov, Klus (SVK)

=== Group 5 ===
Pos	Team	Pld	W	D	L	GF	GA	GD	Pts	Qualification
1	Switzerland	2	1	1	0	51	43	+8	3 (Note: Belarus 25–25 Switzerland)	Qualification phase 2
2	Belarus (H)	2	1	1	0	46	38	+8	3	Qualification phase 2
3	Faroe Islands	2	0	0	2	31	47	−16	0	

Source: EHF
Rules for classification: 1) points; 2) head-to-head points; 3) head-to-head goal difference; 4) head-to-head number of goals scored; 5) goal difference.
(H) Hosts
Notes:

19 March 2021; 18:00	Faroe Islands	13–21	Belarus	Čyžoŭka-Arena, Minsk; Attendance: 350; Referees: Duplii, Pobedrina (UKR)
19 March 2021; 18:00	Henneberg Joensen 3	(7–15)	Ilyina, Kulak 4	Čyžoŭka-Arena, Minsk; Attendance: 350; Referees: Duplii, Pobedrina (UKR)
19 March 2021; 18:00	2× (yellow card) 6× (suspension) 1× (red card)	Report	2× (yellow card) 2× (suspension)	Čyžoŭka-Arena, Minsk; Attendance: 350; Referees: Duplii, Pobedrina (UKR)

20 March 2021; 16:00	Switzerland	26–18	Faroe Islands	Čyžoŭka-Arena, Minsk; Attendance: 130; Referees: Duplii, Pobedrina (UKR)
20 March 2021; 16:00	Kündig 11	(14–11)	Armgarðsdóttir Brimnes, Weyhe 4	Čyžoŭka-Arena, Minsk; Attendance: 130; Referees: Duplii, Pobedrina (UKR)
20 March 2021; 16:00	2× (yellow card) 6× (suspension)	Report	2× (yellow card) 5× (suspension)	Čyžoŭka-Arena, Minsk; Attendance: 130; Referees: Duplii, Pobedrina (UKR)

21 March 2021; 16:00	Belarus	25–25	Switzerland	Čyžoŭka-Arena, Minsk; Attendance: 550; Referees: Duplii, Pobedrina (UKR)
21 March 2021; 16:00	Kulak 8	(15–14)	Hodel 9	Čyžoŭka-Arena, Minsk; Attendance: 550; Referees: Duplii, Pobedrina (UKR)
21 March 2021; 16:00	2× (yellow card) 3× (suspension)	Report	2× (yellow card)	Čyžoŭka-Arena, Minsk; Attendance: 550; Referees: Duplii, Pobedrina (UKR)

== Qualification phase 2 ==
The teams played a home-and away series to determine the participants for the final tournament. The draw took place on 22 March 2021.

=== Seedings ===
Pot 1 (10 best ranked teams from the 2020 European Championship not already qualified for World Championship)	Pot 2 (10 teams from the qualification round)
Czech Republic; Germany; Hungary; Montenegro; Poland; Romania; Russia; Serbia; Slovenia; Sweden	Austria; Belarus; Iceland; Italy; North Macedonia; Portugal; Slovakia; Switzerland; Turkey; Ukraine

All times are UTC+2.

=== Overview ===
Team 1	Agg.	Team 2	1st leg	2nd leg
Turkey	47–80	Russia	23–35	24–45
Czech Republic	55–49	Switzerland	27–27	28–22
Slovenia	45–35	Iceland	24–14	21–21
Slovakia	44–58	Serbia	19–26	25–32
Ukraine	40–50	Sweden	14–28	26–22
Austria	58–55	Poland	29–29	29–26
Hungary	87–31	Italy	46–19	41–12
Romania	68–42	North Macedonia	33–22	35–20
Portugal	50–66	Germany	27–32	23–34
Montenegro	55–47	Belarus	29–23	26–24

=== Matches ===
16 April 2021; 16:30	Turkey	23–35	Russia	Hasan Dağı Spor Salonu, Aksaray; Attendance: 220; Referees: Butskevich, Butskevich (BLR)
16 April 2021; 16:30	Aydın 5	(12–19)	Dmitrieva 7	Hasan Dağı Spor Salonu, Aksaray; Attendance: 220; Referees: Butskevich, Butskevich (BLR)
16 April 2021; 16:30	2× (yellow card) 4× (suspension)	Report	2× (yellow card) 4× (suspension)	Hasan Dağı Spor Salonu, Aksaray; Attendance: 220; Referees: Butskevich, Butskevich (BLR)

20 April 2021; 18:30	Russia	45–24	Turkey	Dynamo Volleyball Arena, Moscow; Attendance: 0 Referees: Aghakishi, Aghakishi (AZE)
20 April 2021; 18:30	Samokhina 7	(24–13)	Akgün 6	Dynamo Volleyball Arena, Moscow; Attendance: 0 Referees: Aghakishi, Aghakishi (AZE)
20 April 2021; 18:30	1× (yellow card) 5× (suspension)	Report	2× (yellow card) 4× (suspension)	Dynamo Volleyball Arena, Moscow; Attendance: 0 Referees: Aghakishi, Aghakishi (AZE)

Russia won 80–47 on aggregate.

17 April 2021; 20:10	Czech Republic	27–27	Switzerland	ROBE Aréna, Zubří; Attendance: 0 Referees: Lidacka, Lesiak (POL)
17 April 2021; 20:10	Hrbková 9	(12–14)	Kündig 8	ROBE Aréna, Zubří; Attendance: 0 Referees: Lidacka, Lesiak (POL)
17 April 2021; 20:10	1× (yellow card) 5× (suspension)	Report	1× (yellow card) 4× (suspension)	ROBE Aréna, Zubří; Attendance: 0 Referees: Lidacka, Lesiak (POL)

20 April 2021; 20:15	Switzerland	22–28	Czech Republic	Mobiliar Arena, Gümligen; Attendance: 0 Referees: Merz, Kuttler (GER)
20 April 2021; 20:15	Kähr 5	(11–14)	Jeřábková 15	Mobiliar Arena, Gümligen; Attendance: 0 Referees: Merz, Kuttler (GER)
20 April 2021; 20:15	1× (yellow card) 4× (suspension)	Report	1× (yellow card) 3× (suspension)	Mobiliar Arena, Gümligen; Attendance: 0 Referees: Merz, Kuttler (GER)

Czech Republic won 55–49 on aggregate.

17 April 2021; 17:30	Slovenia	24–14	Iceland	Sportni Park Kodeljevo, Ljubljana; Attendance: 0 Referees: Metalari, Nikolovski (MKD)
17 April 2021; 17:30	Omoregie 9	(13–7)	Thompson 5	Sportni Park Kodeljevo, Ljubljana; Attendance: 0 Referees: Metalari, Nikolovski (MKD)
17 April 2021; 17:30	1× (yellow card) 2× (suspension)	Report	1× (yellow card) 3× (suspension)	Sportni Park Kodeljevo, Ljubljana; Attendance: 0 Referees: Metalari, Nikolovski (MKD)

21 April 2021; 21:45	Iceland	21–21	Slovenia	Íþróttamiðstöð Hauka, Hafnarfjörður; Attendance: 0 Referees: Smailagic, Smailagic (SWE)
21 April 2021; 21:45	Júlíusdóttir 5	(8–9)	Stanko 8	Íþróttamiðstöð Hauka, Hafnarfjörður; Attendance: 0 Referees: Smailagic, Smailagic (SWE)
21 April 2021; 21:45	1× (yellow card) 2× (suspension)	Report	1× (yellow card) 3× (suspension)	Íþróttamiðstöð Hauka, Hafnarfjörður; Attendance: 0 Referees: Smailagic, Smailagic (SWE)

Slovenia won 45–35 on aggregate.

17 April 2021; 18:00	Slovakia	19–26	Serbia	Mestská Športová Hala Šaľa, Šaľa; Attendance: 0 Referees: Năstase, Stancu (ROU)
17 April 2021; 18:00	Lancz 6	(10–11)	Kovačević 8	Mestská Športová Hala Šaľa, Šaľa; Attendance: 0 Referees: Năstase, Stancu (ROU)
17 April 2021; 18:00	1× (yellow card) 4× (suspension)	Report	1× (yellow card) 3× (suspension)	Mestská Športová Hala Šaľa, Šaľa; Attendance: 0 Referees: Năstase, Stancu (ROU)

21 April 2021; 18:00	Serbia	32–25	Slovakia	Sportski centar Voždovac, Belgrade; Attendance: 0 Referees: Alpaidze, Berezkina (RUS)
21 April 2021; 18:00	Cvijić, Krpež Šlezak 7	(13–12)	Lancz 6	Sportski centar Voždovac, Belgrade; Attendance: 0 Referees: Alpaidze, Berezkina (RUS)
21 April 2021; 18:00	1× (yellow card) 5× (suspension)	Report	1× (yellow card) 1× (suspension)	Sportski centar Voždovac, Belgrade; Attendance: 0 Referees: Alpaidze, Berezkina (RUS)

Serbia won 58–44 on aggregate.

17 April 2021; 16:00	Ukraine	14–28	Sweden	Palace of Sports, Kyiv; Attendance: 0 Referees: Hatipoğlu, Şimşek (TUR)
17 April 2021; 16:00	Smolinh 4	(7–15)	Roberts 4	Palace of Sports, Kyiv; Attendance: 0 Referees: Hatipoğlu, Şimşek (TUR)
17 April 2021; 16:00	2× (yellow card) 3× (suspension)	Report	1× (yellow card) 3× (suspension)	Palace of Sports, Kyiv; Attendance: 0 Referees: Hatipoğlu, Şimşek (TUR)

21 April 2021; 18:10	Sweden	22–26	Ukraine	Sparbanken Skåne Arena, Lund; Attendance: 0 Referees: Ciulei, Stoia (ROU)
21 April 2021; 18:10	Andersson 6	(9–14)	Smolinh 6	Sparbanken Skåne Arena, Lund; Attendance: 0 Referees: Ciulei, Stoia (ROU)
21 April 2021; 18:10	3× (suspension)	Report	2× (yellow card) 2× (suspension)	Sparbanken Skåne Arena, Lund; Attendance: 0 Referees: Ciulei, Stoia (ROU)

Sweden won 50–40 on aggregate.

16 April 2021; 18:10	Austria	29–29	Poland	BSFZ Südstadt, Maria Enzersdorf; Attendance: 0 Referees: Simone, Monitillo (ITA)
16 April 2021; 18:10	Neidhart 8	(13–13)	Nosek 6	BSFZ Südstadt, Maria Enzersdorf; Attendance: 0 Referees: Simone, Monitillo (ITA)
16 April 2021; 18:10	2× (yellow card) 2× (suspension)	Report	5× (suspension)	BSFZ Südstadt, Maria Enzersdorf; Attendance: 0 Referees: Simone, Monitillo (ITA)

20 April 2021; 18:00	Poland	26–29	Austria	Mareckie Centrum Edukacyjno-Rekreacyjne, Marki; Attendance: 0 Referees: Sá, Sá (POR)
20 April 2021; 18:00	Kudłacz-Gloc 6	(11–15)	Frey 10	Mareckie Centrum Edukacyjno-Rekreacyjne, Marki; Attendance: 0 Referees: Sá, Sá (POR)
20 April 2021; 18:00	2× (yellow card) 3× (suspension)	Report	2× (yellow card) 2× (suspension)	Mareckie Centrum Edukacyjno-Rekreacyjne, Marki; Attendance: 0 Referees: Sá, Sá (POR)

Austria won 58–55 on aggregate.

16 April 2021; 16:05	Hungary	46–19	Italy	Érd Aréna, Érd; Attendance: 0 Referees: Fukala, Mohyla (CZE)
16 April 2021; 16:05	Klujber 10	(23–10)	Babbo, Rotondo 5	Érd Aréna, Érd; Attendance: 0 Referees: Fukala, Mohyla (CZE)
16 April 2021; 16:05	2× (suspension)	Report	5× (suspension)	Érd Aréna, Érd; Attendance: 0 Referees: Fukala, Mohyla (CZE)

18 April 2021; 13:00	Italy	12–41	Hungary	Érd Aréna, Érd; Attendance: 0 Referees: Fukala, Mohyla (CZE)
18 April 2021; 13:00	three players 3	(5–17)	Klujber, Lukács 6	Érd Aréna, Érd; Attendance: 0 Referees: Fukala, Mohyla (CZE)
18 April 2021; 13:00	1× (yellow card) 4× (suspension)	Report	2× (yellow card) 1× (suspension)	Érd Aréna, Érd; Attendance: 0 Referees: Fukala, Mohyla (CZE)

Hungary won 87–31 on aggregate.

17 April 2021; 17:00	Romania	33–22	North Macedonia	Dinamo Polyvalent Hall, Bucharest; Attendance: 0 Referees: Antić, Jakovljević (SRB)
17 April 2021; 17:00	Neagu 12	(15–11)	Ristovska 8	Dinamo Polyvalent Hall, Bucharest; Attendance: 0 Referees: Antić, Jakovljević (SRB)
17 April 2021; 17:00	2× (yellow card) 2× (suspension)	Report	1× (yellow card) 4× (suspension)	Dinamo Polyvalent Hall, Bucharest; Attendance: 0 Referees: Antić, Jakovljević (SRB)

21 April 2021; 17:00	North Macedonia	20–35	Romania	Jane Sandanski Arena, Skopje; Attendance: 0 Referees: Praštalo, Balvan (BIH)
21 April 2021; 17:00	Gjeorgjievska 6	(10–18)	Moisă 8	Jane Sandanski Arena, Skopje; Attendance: 0 Referees: Praštalo, Balvan (BIH)
21 April 2021; 17:00	1× (suspension)	Report	3× (yellow card) 3× (suspension)	Jane Sandanski Arena, Skopje; Attendance: 0 Referees: Praštalo, Balvan (BIH)

Romania won 68–42 on aggregate.

17 April 2021; 21:30	Portugal	27–32	Germany	Pavilhão Municipal do Luso, Luso; Attendance: 0 Referees: Carmaux, Mursch (FRA)
17 April 2021; 21:30	Lopes 6	(10–17)	Stockschläder, Zapf 7	Pavilhão Municipal do Luso, Luso; Attendance: 0 Referees: Carmaux, Mursch (FRA)
17 April 2021; 21:30	1× (yellow card) 3× (suspension)	Report	1× (yellow card) 4× (suspension)	Pavilhão Municipal do Luso, Luso; Attendance: 0 Referees: Carmaux, Mursch (FRA)

20 April 2021; 17:30	Germany	34–23	Portugal	Westpress Arena, Hamm; Attendance: 0 Referees: Lindenbaum, Laron (ISR)
20 April 2021; 17:30	Zapf 7	(15–11)	Sousa 6	Westpress Arena, Hamm; Attendance: 0 Referees: Lindenbaum, Laron (ISR)
20 April 2021; 17:30	1× (yellow card) 4× (suspension)	Report	2× (yellow card) 4× (suspension)	Westpress Arena, Hamm; Attendance: 0 Referees: Lindenbaum, Laron (ISR)

Germany won 66–50 on aggregate.

16 April 2021; 18:00	Montenegro	29–23	Belarus	Bemax Arena, Podgorica; Attendance: 0 Referees: Backović, Palačković (SLO)
16 April 2021; 18:00	Jauković 9	(14–13)	Kulak 8	Bemax Arena, Podgorica; Attendance: 0 Referees: Backović, Palačković (SLO)
16 April 2021; 18:00	2× (yellow card) 3× (suspension)	Report	2× (yellow card) 3× (suspension)	Bemax Arena, Podgorica; Attendance: 0 Referees: Backović, Palačković (SLO)

20 April 2021; 17:00	Belarus	24–26	Montenegro	Čyžoŭka-Arena, Minsk; Attendance: 600; Referees: Novikov, Rozhkov (UKR)
20 April 2021; 17:00	Kulak 8	(11–15)	Radičević 7	Čyžoŭka-Arena, Minsk; Attendance: 600; Referees: Novikov, Rozhkov (UKR)
20 April 2021; 17:00	3× (yellow card) 1× (suspension)	Report	1× (yellow card) 2× (suspension)	Čyžoŭka-Arena, Minsk; Attendance: 600; Referees: Novikov, Rozhkov (UKR)

Montenegro won 55–47 on aggregate.
