= 2023 World Women's Handball Championship – European qualification =

The European qualification for the 2023 World Women's Handball Championship, in Denmark, Norway and Sweden, was played over two rounds.

In the first round of qualification, 18 teams who were not participating at the 2022 European Championship played a knockout round with the winners advancing to the second phase, where the teams were joined by the remaining ten teams from the European Championship and play play-off games to determine the qualified teams.

== Qualification phase 1 ==
=== Seeding ===
The draw was held on 29 June 2022 in Vienna, Austria. The winner of each tie advanced to the play-off round.

Pot 1	Pot 2
Austria; Slovakia; Iceland; Turkey; Ukraine; Faroe Islands; Portugal; Greece; Italy	Kosovo; Israel; Finland; Luxembourg; Azerbaijan; Bosnia and Herzegovina; Bulgaria; Great Britain; Latvia

=== Overview ===
Team 1	Agg.	Team 2	1st leg	2nd leg
Azerbaijan	31–68	Portugal	19–32	12–36
Faroe Islands	53–55	Kosovo	24–27	29–28
Slovakia	89–38	Latvia	46–21	43–17
Iceland	67–50	Israel	34–26	33–24
Greece	44–43	Bosnia and Herzegovina	23–21	21–22
Ukraine	66–24	Luxembourg	36–13	30–11
Bulgaria	48–59	Italy	19–26	29–33
Austria	72–50	Finland	37–22	35–28
Great Britain	30–83	Turkey	14–39	16–44

==== Matches ====
3 November 2022; 20:30	Azerbaijan	19–32	Portugal	Pavilhão Municipal de Paredes, Paredes, Portugal; Attendance: 850; Referees: Bočáková, Jánošíková (SVK)
3 November 2022; 20:30	Bayramova 5	(5–16)	Pereira da Silva, Unjanque 5	Pavilhão Municipal de Paredes, Paredes, Portugal; Attendance: 850; Referees: Bočáková, Jánošíková (SVK)
3 November 2022; 20:30	1× (yellow card) 3× (suspension)	Report	3× (yellow card) 5× (suspension)	Pavilhão Municipal de Paredes, Paredes, Portugal; Attendance: 850; Referees: Bočáková, Jánošíková (SVK)

5 November 2022; 22:00	Portugal	36–12	Azerbaijan	Pavilhão Municipal de Paredes, Paredes; Attendance: 1,200; Referees: Bočáková, Jánošíková (SVK)
5 November 2022; 22:00	Pereira da Silva, Unjanque 6	(17–5)	Hasyanova, Mikhalkovich 3	Pavilhão Municipal de Paredes, Paredes; Attendance: 1,200; Referees: Bočáková, Jánošíková (SVK)
5 November 2022; 22:00	1× (yellow card) 4× (suspension)	Report	4× (suspension)	Pavilhão Municipal de Paredes, Paredes; Attendance: 1,200; Referees: Bočáková, Jánošíková (SVK)

Portugal won 68–31 on aggregate

3 November 2022; 19:30	Faroe Islands	24–27	Kosovo	Istog City Sports Hall, Istog, Kosovo; Attendance: 2,150; Referees: Hatipoğlu, Şimşek (TUR)
3 November 2022; 19:30	Geirsdóttir Eystberg 9	(13–14)	Demaj 9	Istog City Sports Hall, Istog, Kosovo; Attendance: 2,150; Referees: Hatipoğlu, Şimşek (TUR)
3 November 2022; 19:30	7× (suspension)	Report	1× (yellow card) 5× (suspension) 1× (red card)	Istog City Sports Hall, Istog, Kosovo; Attendance: 2,150; Referees: Hatipoğlu, Şimşek (TUR)

5 November 2022; 19:30	Kosovo	28–29	Faroe Islands	Istog City Sports Hall, Istog; Attendance: 2,250; Referees: Hatipoğlu, Şimşek (TUR)
5 November 2022; 19:30	Demaj 11	(16–16)	Geirsdóttir Eystberg, Mittún 6	Istog City Sports Hall, Istog; Attendance: 2,250; Referees: Hatipoğlu, Şimşek (TUR)
5 November 2022; 19:30	1× (yellow card) 4× (suspension)	Report	1× (yellow card) 3× (suspension)	Istog City Sports Hall, Istog; Attendance: 2,250; Referees: Hatipoğlu, Şimşek (TUR)

Kosovo won 55–53 on aggregate.

2 November 2022; 19:00	Slovakia	46–21	Latvia	Mestská Sportova hala Sala, Šaľa; Attendance: 1,499; Referees: Jakovljević, Kovačević (SRB)
2 November 2022; 19:00	Lancz 6	(23–13)	Millere 8	Mestská Sportova hala Sala, Šaľa; Attendance: 1,499; Referees: Jakovljević, Kovačević (SRB)
2 November 2022; 19:00	1× (yellow card) 3× (suspension)	Report	2× (suspension)	Mestská Sportova hala Sala, Šaľa; Attendance: 1,499; Referees: Jakovljević, Kovačević (SRB)

6 November 2022; 14:10	Latvia	17–43	Slovakia	Valmieris Olympic Centre, Valmiera; Attendance: 100; Referees: Merisi, Pepe (ITA)
6 November 2022; 14:10	Millere 5	(11–16)	Lancz 10	Valmieris Olympic Centre, Valmiera; Attendance: 100; Referees: Merisi, Pepe (ITA)
6 November 2022; 14:10	1× (yellow card) 4× (suspension)	Report	1× (yellow card) 4× (suspension)	Valmieris Olympic Centre, Valmiera; Attendance: 100; Referees: Merisi, Pepe (ITA)

Slovakia won 89–38 on aggregate.

5 November 2022; 16:00	Iceland	34–26	Israel	Ithrottamidstod Hauka Asvellir, Hafnarfjörður; Attendance: 800; Referees: Borge, Nygren (NOR)
5 November 2022; 16:00	Erlingsdóttir 11	(18–15)	Shaul 11	Ithrottamidstod Hauka Asvellir, Hafnarfjörður; Attendance: 800; Referees: Borge, Nygren (NOR)
5 November 2022; 16:00	1× (yellow card) 1× (suspension)	Report	1× (yellow card) 3× (suspension)	Ithrottamidstod Hauka Asvellir, Hafnarfjörður; Attendance: 800; Referees: Borge, Nygren (NOR)

6 November 2022; 16:00	Israel	24–33	Iceland	Ithrottamidstod Hauka Asvellir, Hafnarfjörður, Iceland; Attendance: 700; Referees: Borge, Nygren (NOR)
6 November 2022; 16:00	Shaul 6	(11–14)	Jacobsen 7	Ithrottamidstod Hauka Asvellir, Hafnarfjörður, Iceland; Attendance: 700; Referees: Borge, Nygren (NOR)
6 November 2022; 16:00	1× (yellow card) 2× (suspension)	Report	1× (yellow card) 2× (suspension)	Ithrottamidstod Hauka Asvellir, Hafnarfjörður, Iceland; Attendance: 700; Referees: Borge, Nygren (NOR)

Iceland won 67–50 on aggregate.

3 November 2022; 20:00	Greece	23–21	Bosnia and Herzegovina	Sports Hall Cazin, Cazin, Bosnia and Herzegovina; Attendance: 2,500; Referees: Ivanović, Vujisić (MNE)
3 November 2022; 20:00	Mania 7	(8–9)	Kolašinac 7	Sports Hall Cazin, Cazin, Bosnia and Herzegovina; Attendance: 2,500; Referees: Ivanović, Vujisić (MNE)
3 November 2022; 20:00	2× (yellow card) 8× (suspension)	Report	1× (yellow card) 5× (suspension)	Sports Hall Cazin, Cazin, Bosnia and Herzegovina; Attendance: 2,500; Referees: Ivanović, Vujisić (MNE)

5 November 2022; 17:00	Bosnia and Herzegovina	22–21	Greece	Sports Hall Cazin, Cazin; Attendance: 1,300; Referees: Ivanović, Vujisić (MNE)
5 November 2022; 17:00	Gudelj 7	(14–9)	Kerlidi, Zygoura 4	Sports Hall Cazin, Cazin; Attendance: 1,300; Referees: Ivanović, Vujisić (MNE)
5 November 2022; 17:00	1× (yellow card) 5× (suspension)	Report	2× (yellow card) 5× (suspension)	Sports Hall Cazin, Cazin; Attendance: 1,300; Referees: Ivanović, Vujisić (MNE)

Greece won 44–43 on aggregate.

1 November 2022; 19:00	Ukraine	36–13	Luxembourg	d'Coque, Luxembourg City, Luxembourg; Attendance: 352; Referees: Klompers, Stobbe (NED)
1 November 2022; 19:00	Levchenko 8	(18–6)	Welter 5	d'Coque, Luxembourg City, Luxembourg; Attendance: 352; Referees: Klompers, Stobbe (NED)
1 November 2022; 19:00	3× (suspension)	Report	3× (suspension)	d'Coque, Luxembourg City, Luxembourg; Attendance: 352; Referees: Klompers, Stobbe (NED)

2 November 2022; 19:00	Luxembourg	11–30	Ukraine	d'Coque, Luxembourg City; Attendance: 276; Referees: Klompers, Stobbe (NED)
2 November 2022; 19:00	Kozar 3	(5–16)	Konovalova 6	d'Coque, Luxembourg City; Attendance: 276; Referees: Klompers, Stobbe (NED)
2 November 2022; 19:00	2× (suspension)	Report		d'Coque, Luxembourg City; Attendance: 276; Referees: Klompers, Stobbe (NED)

Ukraine won 66–24 on aggregate.

2 November 2022; 17:00	Bulgaria	19–26	Italy	Palace of Culture and Sports, Varna; Attendance: 1,500; Referees: Ilieva, Karbeska (MKD)
2 November 2022; 17:00	Gencheva 6	(12–9)	Babbo 5	Palace of Culture and Sports, Varna; Attendance: 1,500; Referees: Ilieva, Karbeska (MKD)
2 November 2022; 17:00	1× (yellow card) 2× (suspension)	Report	1× (yellow card) 1× (suspension)	Palace of Culture and Sports, Varna; Attendance: 1,500; Referees: Ilieva, Karbeska (MKD)

6 November 2022; 18:30	Italy	33–29	Bulgaria	Pala Santa Filomena, Chieti; Attendance: 1,300; Referees: Lidacka, Lesiak (POL)
6 November 2022; 18:30	Manojlovic 8	(18–13)	Tomova 9	Pala Santa Filomena, Chieti; Attendance: 1,300; Referees: Lidacka, Lesiak (POL)
6 November 2022; 18:30		Report	5× (suspension)	Pala Santa Filomena, Chieti; Attendance: 1,300; Referees: Lidacka, Lesiak (POL)

Italy won 59–48 on aggregate.

3 November 2022; 20:25	Austria	37–22	Finland	BSFZ Südstadt, Maria Enzersdorf; Attendance: 800; Referees: Capoccia, Jucker (SUI)
3 November 2022; 20:25	Neidhart 9	(18–11)	Holopainen 7	BSFZ Südstadt, Maria Enzersdorf; Attendance: 800; Referees: Capoccia, Jucker (SUI)
3 November 2022; 20:25	1× (yellow card) 3× (suspension)	Report	1× (yellow card) 5× (suspension)	BSFZ Südstadt, Maria Enzersdorf; Attendance: 800; Referees: Capoccia, Jucker (SUI)

6 November 2022; 14:00	Finland	28–35	Austria	Energia Areena, Vantaa; Attendance: 500; Referees: Kijauskaitė, Žalienė (LTU)
6 November 2022; 14:00	Hilli 8	(13–16)	Pandza 6	Energia Areena, Vantaa; Attendance: 500; Referees: Kijauskaitė, Žalienė (LTU)
6 November 2022; 14:00	6× (suspension)	Report	1× (yellow card) 4× (suspension)	Energia Areena, Vantaa; Attendance: 500; Referees: Kijauskaitė, Žalienė (LTU)

Austria won 72–50 on aggregate.

5 November 2022; 18:00	Great Britain	14–39	Turkey	THF Spor Complex, Çankaya, Turkey; Attendance: 1,500; Referees: Murariu, Paraschiv (ROU)
5 November 2022; 18:00	Thornewell 4	(7–23)	Sarikaya 7	THF Spor Complex, Çankaya, Turkey; Attendance: 1,500; Referees: Murariu, Paraschiv (ROU)
5 November 2022; 18:00	1× (yellow card) 4× (suspension)	Report	1× (yellow card) 2× (suspension)	THF Spor Complex, Çankaya, Turkey; Attendance: 1,500; Referees: Murariu, Paraschiv (ROU)

6 November 2022; 18:00	Turkey	44–16	Great Britain	THF Spor Complex, Çankaya; Attendance: 1,200; Referees: Murariu, Paraschiv (ROU)
6 November 2022; 18:00	Sarikaya 7	(21–7)	Gowland 5	THF Spor Complex, Çankaya; Attendance: 1,200; Referees: Murariu, Paraschiv (ROU)
6 November 2022; 18:00	1× (yellow card) 4× (suspension)	Report	3× (suspension)	THF Spor Complex, Çankaya; Attendance: 1,200; Referees: Murariu, Paraschiv (ROU)

Turkey won 83–30 on aggregate.

== Qualification phase 2 ==
The draw took place on 19 November 2022. Serbia and Kosovo were not allowed to be drawn against each other. The nine winners of phase 1, the Czech Republic and ten teams from the 2022 European Women's Handball Championship played in this round. The games were played on 7 and 8 April and 11 and 12 April 2023.

=== Seeding ===
Pot 1	Pot 2
Croatia; Spain; Germany; Hungary; North Macedonia; Poland; Romania; Slovenia; Serbia; Switzerland	Czech Republic; Austria; Slovakia; Iceland; Turkey; Ukraine; Portugal; Greece; Italy; Kosovo

=== Overview ===
Team 1	Agg.	Team 2	1st leg	2nd leg
Turkey	49–65	Serbia	24–33	25–32
Romania	63–44	Portugal	35–20	28–24
Iceland	49–59	Hungary	21–25	28–34
Poland	68–42	Kosovo	36–22	32–20
Italy	46–64	Slovenia	25–31	21–33
Germany	75–33	Greece	39–13	36–20
Switzerland	58–68	Czech Republic	31–32	27–36
Austria	52–54	Spain	28–28	24–26
North Macedonia	44–55	Ukraine	22–24	22–31
Slovakia	41–56	Croatia	23–25	18–31

==== Matches ====
7 April 2023; 16:00	Turkey	24–33	Serbia	Giresun Batlama, Giresun; Attendance: 3,000; Referees: Simone, Monitillo (ITA)
7 April 2023; 16:00	Çalışkan 8	(10–15)	Radosavljević 9	Giresun Batlama, Giresun; Attendance: 3,000; Referees: Simone, Monitillo (ITA)
7 April 2023; 16:00	1× (yellow card) 3× (suspension)	Report	2× (yellow card) 5× (suspension)	Giresun Batlama, Giresun; Attendance: 3,000; Referees: Simone, Monitillo (ITA)

12 April 2023; 18:00	Serbia	32–25	Turkey	Sportski centar Voždovac, Belgrade; Attendance: 1,900; Referees: Yovchev, Yonchev (BUL)
12 April 2023; 18:00	Stoiljković 7	(16–15)	Karaçam 10	Sportski centar Voždovac, Belgrade; Attendance: 1,900; Referees: Yovchev, Yonchev (BUL)
12 April 2023; 18:00	1× (yellow card) 1× (suspension)	Report	1× (yellow card) 3× (suspension)	Sportski centar Voždovac, Belgrade; Attendance: 1,900; Referees: Yovchev, Yonchev (BUL)

Serbia won 65–49 on aggregate.

8 April 2023; 16:00	Romania	35–20	Portugal	Pitești Arena, Pitești; Attendance: 4,000; Referees: Merisi, Pepe (ITA)
8 April 2023; 16:00	Grozav 7	(19–12)	Andreia Da Silva Lima 5	Pitești Arena, Pitești; Attendance: 4,000; Referees: Merisi, Pepe (ITA)
8 April 2023; 16:00	5× (suspension)	Report	5× (suspension) 1× (red card)	Pitești Arena, Pitești; Attendance: 4,000; Referees: Merisi, Pepe (ITA)

12 April 2023; 21:15	Portugal	24–28	Romania	Pavilhão Municipal de Paredes, Paredes; Attendance: 1,400; Referees: Fahner, Kubis (POL)
12 April 2023; 21:15	Marqués Santiago 6	(8–13)	Ostase 5	Pavilhão Municipal de Paredes, Paredes; Attendance: 1,400; Referees: Fahner, Kubis (POL)
12 April 2023; 21:15	4× (suspension)	Report	2× (suspension)	Pavilhão Municipal de Paredes, Paredes; Attendance: 1,400; Referees: Fahner, Kubis (POL)

Romania won 63–44 on aggregate.

8 April 2023; 18:00	Iceland	21–25	Hungary	Ithrottamidstod Hauka Asvellir, Hafnarfjörður; Attendance: 1,100; Referees: Manea, Iliescu (ROU)
8 April 2023; 18:00	Björnsdóttir 5	(10–14)	Klujber 6	Ithrottamidstod Hauka Asvellir, Hafnarfjörður; Attendance: 1,100; Referees: Manea, Iliescu (ROU)
8 April 2023; 18:00	2× (yellow card) 1× (suspension)	Report	3× (yellow card) 5× (suspension)	Ithrottamidstod Hauka Asvellir, Hafnarfjörður; Attendance: 1,100; Referees: Manea, Iliescu (ROU)

12 April 2023; 18:15	Hungary	34–28	Iceland	Érd Aréna, Érd; Attendance: 1,500; Referees: Ilieva, Karbeska (MKD)
12 April 2023; 18:15	Vámos 8	(17–14)	Sturludóttir 8	Érd Aréna, Érd; Attendance: 1,500; Referees: Ilieva, Karbeska (MKD)
12 April 2023; 18:15	1× (yellow card) 5× (suspension) 1× (red card)	Report	1× (yellow card) 4× (suspension)	Érd Aréna, Érd; Attendance: 1,500; Referees: Ilieva, Karbeska (MKD)

Hungary won 59–49 on aggregate.

6 April 2023; 17:45	Poland	36–22	Kosovo	Dębowiec Sports Arena, Bielsko-Biała; Attendance: 2,000; Referees: Radčenko, Pērsis (LAT)
6 April 2023; 17:45	Kobylińska, Rosiak 6	(17–6)	Demaj, Hajdari 5	Dębowiec Sports Arena, Bielsko-Biała; Attendance: 2,000; Referees: Radčenko, Pērsis (LAT)
6 April 2023; 17:45	5× (suspension)	Report	6× (suspension)	Dębowiec Sports Arena, Bielsko-Biała; Attendance: 2,000; Referees: Radčenko, Pērsis (LAT)

12 April 2023; 20:15	Kosovo	20–32	Poland	Palace of Youth and Sports, Pristina; Attendance: 1,500; Referees: Peretz, Schwartz (ISR)
12 April 2023; 20:15	Demaj 7	(12–17)	Kobylińska, Nocuń 7	Palace of Youth and Sports, Pristina; Attendance: 1,500; Referees: Peretz, Schwartz (ISR)
12 April 2023; 20:15	1× (yellow card) 6× (suspension)	Report	1× (yellow card) 6× (suspension)	Palace of Youth and Sports, Pristina; Attendance: 1,500; Referees: Peretz, Schwartz (ISR)

Poland won 68–42 on aggregate.

8 April 2023; 18:30	Italy	25–31	Slovenia	Pala Santa Filomena, Chieti; Attendance: 1,000; Referees: Kijauskaitė, Žalienė (LTU)
8 April 2023; 18:30	Dalla Costa, Ghilardi 6	(11–17)	Stanko 7	Pala Santa Filomena, Chieti; Attendance: 1,000; Referees: Kijauskaitė, Žalienė (LTU)
8 April 2023; 18:30	1× (yellow card) 5× (suspension)	Report	1× (yellow card) 6× (suspension)	Pala Santa Filomena, Chieti; Attendance: 1,000; Referees: Kijauskaitė, Žalienė (LTU)

12 April 2023; 17:30	Slovenia	33–21	Italy	Športna dvorana Kodeljevo, Ljubljana; Attendance: 800; Referees: Altmár, Horváth (HUN)
12 April 2023; 17:30	Varagić 8	(18–13)	Eghianruwa 8	Športna dvorana Kodeljevo, Ljubljana; Attendance: 800; Referees: Altmár, Horváth (HUN)
12 April 2023; 17:30	1× (suspension)	Report	1× (yellow card) 1× (suspension)	Športna dvorana Kodeljevo, Ljubljana; Attendance: 800; Referees: Altmár, Horváth (HUN)

Slovenia won 64–46 on aggregate.

9 April 2023; 17:15	Germany	39–13	Greece	Westpress Arena, Hamm; Attendance: 2,110; Referees: Pagh, Thygesen (DEN)
9 April 2023; 17:15	Maidhof 7	(22–6)	Chatziparasidou 3	Westpress Arena, Hamm; Attendance: 2,110; Referees: Pagh, Thygesen (DEN)
9 April 2023; 17:15	1× (yellow card) 2× (suspension)	Report	2× (suspension)	Westpress Arena, Hamm; Attendance: 2,110; Referees: Pagh, Thygesen (DEN)

12 April 2023; 17:00	Greece	20–36	Germany	Tasos Kampouris Kanithou Indoor Hall, Chalcis; Attendance: 50; Referees: Bošnjak, Marić (BIH)
12 April 2023; 17:00	Chatziparasidou 6	(11–20)	Smits 6	Tasos Kampouris Kanithou Indoor Hall, Chalcis; Attendance: 50; Referees: Bošnjak, Marić (BIH)
12 April 2023; 17:00	5× (suspension)	Report	1× (yellow card) 7× (suspension)	Tasos Kampouris Kanithou Indoor Hall, Chalcis; Attendance: 50; Referees: Bošnjak, Marić (BIH)

Germany won 75–33 on aggregate.

8 April 2023; 15:00	Switzerland	31–32	Czech Republic	St. Jakobshalle, Basel; Attendance: 3,129; Referees: Vujačić, Kažanegra (MNE)
8 April 2023; 15:00	Bucher 8	(12–14)	Jeřábková, Malá 9	St. Jakobshalle, Basel; Attendance: 3,129; Referees: Vujačić, Kažanegra (MNE)
8 April 2023; 15:00	2× (yellow card) 3× (suspension)	Report	3× (suspension)	St. Jakobshalle, Basel; Attendance: 3,129; Referees: Vujačić, Kažanegra (MNE)

11 April 2023; 19:30	Czech Republic	36–27	Switzerland	Městská hala Vodova, Brno; Attendance: 1,515; Referees: Praštalo, Balvan (BIH)
11 April 2023; 19:30	Jeřábková 9	(17–10)	Kündig 7	Městská hala Vodova, Brno; Attendance: 1,515; Referees: Praštalo, Balvan (BIH)
11 April 2023; 19:30	1× (yellow card) 1× (suspension)	Report	1× (yellow card)	Městská hala Vodova, Brno; Attendance: 1,515; Referees: Praštalo, Balvan (BIH)

Czech Republic won 68–58 on aggregate.

8 April 2023; 18:00	Austria	28–28	Spain	BSFZ Südstadt, Maria Enzersdorf; Attendance: 900; Referees: Antić, Jakovljević (SRB)
8 April 2023; 18:00	Kovács 7	(14–18)	Cabral, Gassama 5	BSFZ Südstadt, Maria Enzersdorf; Attendance: 900; Referees: Antić, Jakovljević (SRB)
8 April 2023; 18:00	4× (suspension)	Report	1× (yellow card) 4× (suspension) 1× (red card)	BSFZ Südstadt, Maria Enzersdorf; Attendance: 900; Referees: Antić, Jakovljević (SRB)

12 April 2023; 20:30	Spain	26–24	Austria	Polideportivo Fernando Argüelles, Antequera; Attendance: 1,900; Referees: Mikelić, Paradina (CRO)
12 April 2023; 20:30	Gutiérrez Bermejo 6	(11–12)	Pandza 5	Polideportivo Fernando Argüelles, Antequera; Attendance: 1,900; Referees: Mikelić, Paradina (CRO)
12 April 2023; 20:30	2× (yellow card) 3× (suspension)	Report	1× (yellow card) 3× (suspension)	Polideportivo Fernando Argüelles, Antequera; Attendance: 1,900; Referees: Mikelić, Paradina (CRO)

Spain won 54–52 on aggregate.

8 April 2023; 19:00	North Macedonia	22–24	Ukraine	Boris Trajkovski Sports Center, Skopje; Attendance: 2,500; Referees: Cipov, Klus (SVK)
8 April 2023; 19:00	Ristovska 8	(8–14)	three players 5	Boris Trajkovski Sports Center, Skopje; Attendance: 2,500; Referees: Cipov, Klus (SVK)
8 April 2023; 19:00	1× (yellow card) 6× (suspension) 1× (red card)	Report	1× (yellow card) 6× (suspension)	Boris Trajkovski Sports Center, Skopje; Attendance: 2,500; Referees: Cipov, Klus (SVK)

11 April 2023; 17:00	Ukraine	31–22	North Macedonia	Városi Sportcsarnok Kisvárda, Kisvárda, Hungary (Note: Due to the Russian invasion of Ukraine, the Ukrainian team played its home match at neutral venue.); Attendance: 700; Referees: Vranes, Wenninger (AUT)
11 April 2023; 17:00	Glibko 7	(14–12)	Gichevska 10	Városi Sportcsarnok Kisvárda, Kisvárda, Hungary; Attendance: 700; Referees: Vranes, Wenninger (AUT)
11 April 2023; 17:00	1× (yellow card) 5× (suspension) 1× (red card)	Report	1× (yellow card) 5× (suspension)	Városi Sportcsarnok Kisvárda, Kisvárda, Hungary; Attendance: 700; Referees: Vranes, Wenninger (AUT)

Ukraine won 55–44 on aggregate.

7 April 2023; 19:00	Slovakia	23–25	Croatia	Mestská Sportova hala Sala, Šaľa; Attendance: 1,500; Referees: Hatipoğlu, Şimşek (TUR)
7 April 2023; 19:00	Lancz 7	(8–11)	Birtić, Burić 5	Mestská Sportova hala Sala, Šaľa; Attendance: 1,500; Referees: Hatipoğlu, Şimşek (TUR)
7 April 2023; 19:00	8× (suspension) 1× (red card)	Report	1× (yellow card) 6× (suspension)	Mestská Sportova hala Sala, Šaľa; Attendance: 1,500; Referees: Hatipoğlu, Şimşek (TUR)

12 April 2023; 18:00	Croatia	31–18	Slovakia	Sporthall Vijuš, Slavonski Brod; Attendance: 2,250; Referees: Lovin, Stancu (ROU)
12 April 2023; 18:00	Milosavljević 8	(17–10)	Lancz 6	Sporthall Vijuš, Slavonski Brod; Attendance: 2,250; Referees: Lovin, Stancu (ROU)
12 April 2023; 18:00	3× (yellow card) 7× (suspension) 1× (red card)	Report	2× (yellow card) 4× (suspension)	Sporthall Vijuš, Slavonski Brod; Attendance: 2,250; Referees: Lovin, Stancu (ROU)

Croatia won 56–41 on aggregate.
