= Anastasia Lobach =

Belarusian handball player

Personal information
- Full name: Anastasia Sergeyevna Lobach
- Nationality: Belarusian
- Born: 25 June 1987 (age 39) Minsk, Byelorussian SSR, Soviet Union
- Height: 1.82 m (6 ft 0 in)

Sport
- Sport: Handball
- Position: Line Player
- Current club: Rostov-Don

Senior clubs
- Years: Team
- 2003–2005: Arkatron Minsk
- 2005–2006: BNTU Minsk Region
- 2006–2008: SC Galytchanka Lviv
- 2008–2010: BNTU Minsk Region
- 2010–2011: HPK Arkatron
- 2011–2012: HC Dunărea Brăila
- 2012–2014: Zvezda Zvenigorod
- 2014–2015: HCM Baia Mare
- 2015–2016: HC Gomel
- 2016–2018: CSM București
- 2019–2020: HC Gomel
- 2020–2021: Rostov-Don
- 2024: BNTU Minsk Region
National team
- Years: Team
- 2005–2021: Belarus

Teams managed
- 2025–: BNTU Minsk Region (coach)

Anastasia Sergeyevna Lobach (Russian: Анастасия Лобач, Belarusian: Анастасія Лобач) (born 25 June 1987 in Minsk), née Anastasia Kamenshykova, is a former Belarusian handballer who played for the Belarus national team.

== Personal life ==
During the 2020 Belarusian protests, Lobach and several other Belarusian handball players appealed to the authorities calling for an end to violence against protesters.

== International honours ==
- EHF Champions League:
  - Bronze Medalist: 2017, 2018
- EHF Cup Winners' Cup:
  - Silver Medalist: 2014

== Individual awards ==
- Top Scorer of the Belarusian Championship: 2011
- Best Defence Player of the Baia Mare Champions Trophy: 2014
