= 2014 Baia Mare Champions Trophy =

- 2014 Baia Mare Champions Trophy official logo Baia Mare capitala handbalului românesc (Baia Mare the capital of the Romanian handball)

Tournament details
- Dates: 15–17 August
- Teams: 6 (from 1 confederation)

Final positions
- Champions: (Romania) HCM Baia Mare (1st title)
- Runners-up: (Hungary) FTC-Rail Cargo Hungaria
- Third place: (Russia) HC Astrakhanochka

Awards
- Best player: (Spain) Nerea Pena

The 2014 Baia Mare Champions Trophy was the first Baia Mare Champions Trophy. It was held in Baia Mare, Romania from 15 to 17 August as a pre-season international women's team handball tournament for clubs. Two-time EHF Champions League winner Krim and FTC-Rail Cargo Hungaria appeared in the tournament, along with the hosts HCM Baia Mare and others.

The tournament was aired on Digi Sport 2 and Digi Sport 3.

HCM Baia Mare won the title by defeating FTC-Rail Cargo Hungaria in the final.

== Participants ==
- (Romania) HCM Baia Mare (hosts)
- (Slovenia) Krim
- (Hungary) FTC-Rail Cargo Hungaria
- (Russia) HC Astrakhanochka
- (Russia) Rostov-Don
- (Slovakia) IUVENTA Michalovce

== Results ==
=== Group stage ===
==== Group A ====
Team	Pld	W	D	L	GF	GA	GD	Pts
(Romania) HCM Baia Mare	2	2	0	0	68	49	+19	4
(Russia) Rostov-Don	2	1	0	1	56	52	+4	2
(Slovenia) Krim	2	0	0	2	51	74	−23	0

15 August 2014; 18:00	HCM Baia Mare (Romania)	41–26	(Slovenia) Krim	Sala Sporturilor "Lascăr Pană"; Attendance: 3,000; Referees: Florescu, Stoia (ROU)
15 August 2014; 18:00	Ardean-Elisei 8	(17–12)	Bajramoska 8	Sala Sporturilor "Lascăr Pană"; Attendance: 3,000; Referees: Florescu, Stoia (ROU)
15 August 2014; 18:00	3× (yellow card) 4× (suspension)	Report	3× (yellow card)	Sala Sporturilor "Lascăr Pană"; Attendance: 3,000; Referees: Florescu, Stoia (ROU)

16 August 2014; 11:00	Rostov-Don (Russia)	33–25	(Slovenia) Krim	Sala Sporturilor "Lascăr Pană"
16 August 2014; 11:00	Borshchenko 6	(18–14)	Barič 6	Sala Sporturilor "Lascăr Pană"
16 August 2014; 11:00		Report		Sala Sporturilor "Lascăr Pană"

16 August 2014; 18:00	HCM Baia Mare (Romania)	27–23	(Russia) Rostov-Don	Sala Sporturilor "Lascăr Pană"; Attendance: 3,000; Referees: Năstase, Stancu (ROU)
16 August 2014; 18:00	Buceschi 6	(13–12)	Managarova, Punko 5	Sala Sporturilor "Lascăr Pană"; Attendance: 3,000; Referees: Năstase, Stancu (ROU)
16 August 2014; 18:00	2× (suspension)	Report	7× (suspension)	Sala Sporturilor "Lascăr Pană"; Attendance: 3,000; Referees: Năstase, Stancu (ROU)

==== Group B ====
Team	Pld	W	D	L	GF	GA	GD	Pts
(Hungary) FTC-Rail Cargo Hungaria	2	2	0	0	78	58	+20	4
(Russia) HC Astrakhanochka	2	1	0	1	64	65	−1	2
(Slovakia) IUVENTA Michalovce	2	0	0	2	52	81	−29	0

15 August 2014; 16:00	FTC-Rail Cargo Hungaria (Hungary)	40–25	(Slovakia) IUVENTA Michalovce	Sala Sporturilor "Lascăr Pană"
15 August 2014; 16:00	Vérten, Rédei Soós 6	(22–12)	Trehubova 5	Sala Sporturilor "Lascăr Pană"
15 August 2014; 16:00		Report		Sala Sporturilor "Lascăr Pană"

16 August 2014; 09:00	HC Astrakhanochka (Russia)	41–27	(Slovakia) IUVENTA Michalovce	Sala Sporturilor "Lascăr Pană"
16 August 2014; 09:00	Kuznetcova 8	(25–15)	three players 6	Sala Sporturilor "Lascăr Pană"
16 August 2014; 09:00		Report		Sala Sporturilor "Lascăr Pană"

16 August 2014; 16:00	FTC-Rail Cargo Hungaria (Hungary)	38–33	HC Astrakhanochka (Russia)	Sala Sporturilor "Lascăr Pană"
16 August 2014; 16:00	Pena 9	(21–15)	Vyakhireva, Yezhykava 9	Sala Sporturilor "Lascăr Pană"
16 August 2014; 16:00		Report		Sala Sporturilor "Lascăr Pană"

=== Knockout stages ===
==== 5th place game ====
17 August 2014; 09:00	(Slovenia) Krim	28–27	(Slovakia) IUVENTA Michalovce	Sala Sporturilor "Lascăr Pană"
17 August 2014; 09:00	Bajramoska 11	(16–13)	Trehubova 8	Sala Sporturilor "Lascăr Pană"
17 August 2014; 09:00		Report		Sala Sporturilor "Lascăr Pană"

==== 3rd place game ====
17 August 2014
11:00
(Russia) Rostov-Don
35–36 (ET)
(Russia) HC Astrakhanochka
Sala Sporturilor "Lascăr Pană"
Borshchenko 10
(10–15)
Vyakhireva 11

Report

FT: 31–31 ET: 35–36

==== Final ====
17 August 2014; 13:00	(Hungary) FTC-Rail Cargo Hungaria	27–29	(Romania) HCM Baia Mare	Sala Sporturilor "Lascăr Pană"; Attendance: 3,000; Referees: Florescu, Stoia (ROU)
17 August 2014; 13:00	Pena 7	(13–14)	Buceschi 8	Sala Sporturilor "Lascăr Pană"; Attendance: 3,000; Referees: Florescu, Stoia (ROU)
17 August 2014; 13:00	2× (suspension)	Report	3× (suspension)	Sala Sporturilor "Lascăr Pană"; Attendance: 3,000; Referees: Florescu, Stoia (ROU)

== Awards ==
=== Team of the Tournament ===
- Goalkeeper: Paula Ungureanu (ROU)
- Left wing: Camilla Herrem (NOR)
- Left back: Zsuzsanna Tomori (HUN)
- Playmaker: Ekaterina Ilina (RUS)
- Pivot: Piroska Szamoránsky (HUN)
- Right back: Anna Vyakhireva (RUS)
- Right wing: Iuliia Managarova (UKR)

=== Special awards ===
- Top Scorer: Mirjeta Bajramoska (MKD)
- Best Goalkeeper: Paula Ungureanu (ROU)
- Best Defence Player: Anastasia Lobach (BLR)
- Most Valuable Player: Nerea Pena (ESP)
- Fair Play Award: IUVENTA Michalovce (SVK)
