= Elena Abramovich =

Belarusian handball player

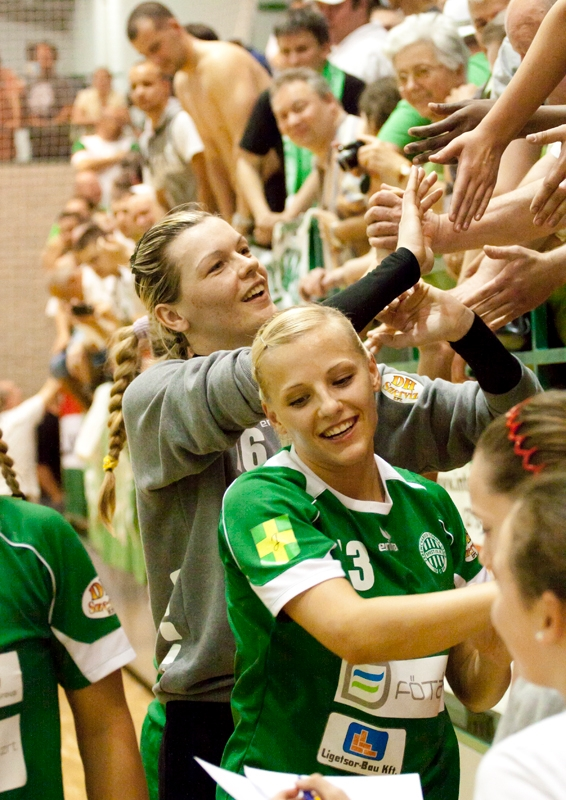
- Elena Abramovich (front)

Personal information
- Full name: Elena Abramovich
- Nationality: Belarusian
- Born: 18 July 1981 (age 45) Minsk, Byelorussian SSR
- Height: 1.92 m (6 ft 4 in)

Sport
- Sport: Handball
- Position: Goalkeeper
- Current club: Retired

Senior clubs
- Years: Team
- 1999–2004: Arkatron Minsk
- 2004–2006: Zvezda Zvenigorod
- 2006–2010: Hódmezővásárhelyi NKC
- 2010–2014: Ferencvárosi TC
National team
- Years: Team
- 2002–2014: Belarus

Elena Abramovich (Belarusian: Алена Абрамовіч; Russian: Елена Абрамович; born 18 July 1981 in Minsk) is a former Belarusian handball goalkeeper who played for Ferencvárosi TC and the Belarusian national team. Currently she is the goalkeeping coach of MTK Budapest.

She made her international debut on the 2002 European Championship in Denmark.

Her husband is Vladimir Golovin, handball coach.

== Achievements ==
- Nemzeti Bajnokság I:
  - Runner-up: 2012
- EHF Cup Winners Cup:
  - Winner: 2011, 2012
