= Natallia Vasileuskaya =

Belarusian handball player

Personal information
- Nationality: Belarusian
- Born: 23 February 1991 (age 35) Zelva, Belarus
- Height: 1.75 m (5 ft 9 in)

Sport
- Sport: Handball
- Position: Right back
- Current club: Gloria Bistrița

Senior clubs
- Years: Team
- 2011-2013: HC Gorodnichanka
- 2013-2014: ESBF Besançon
- 2014-2015: Chambray Touraine HB
- 2015-2016: HC Kuban Krasnodar
- 2016-2017: Békéscsabai Előre NKSE
- 2017-2019: SCM Râmnicu Vâlcea
- 2019-: Gloria Bistrița
National team
- Years: Team
- 2012-: Belarus

Natallia Vasileuskaya (born 23 February 1991) is a Belarusian handballer who plays for Gloria Bistrița and the Belarus national team.

== Achievements ==
- Romanian National League:
  - Winner: 2019
- Romanian Cup:
  - Finalist: 2018, 2019
- Belarusian Championship:
  - Silver Medalist: 2013, 2013
