= Konstantin Sharovarov =

Belarusian handball player

Personal information
- Full name: Konstantin Grigorevich Sharovarov
- Born: 15 August 1964 (age 62) Minsk, Belarus SSR, Soviet Union
- Height: 1.81 m (5 ft 11 in)

Sport
- Sport: Handball
- Position: Right wing

Senior clubs
- Years: Team
- 1982–1992: SKA Minsk
- 1992–1993: SV Blau-Weiß Spandau
- 1993–1995: Maccabi Rishon LeZion
- 1995–1996: SKA Minsk
- 1996–1997: Maccabi Kirjat Motzkin
- 1997–1998: GF Kroppskultur
- 1998–2001: Anderstorps SK
National team
Years	Team		
–	Soviet Union		
–	Belarus	51	(149)

Teams managed
- 2004–: BNTU Minsk
Medal record
Men's handball
Representing Soviet Union
Olympic Games
Gold medal – first place	1988 Seoul	Team
World Championships
Silver medal – second place	1990 Czechoslovakia	Team

Konstantin Grigorevich Sharovarov (Belarusian: Канстанцін Рыгоравіч Шаравараў; Russian: Константин Григорьевич Шароваров, born August 15, 1964, in Minsk, Belarusian SSR) is a former Soviet/Belarusian handball player who competed in the 1988 Summer Olympics.

In 1988 he won the gold medal with the Soviet team. He played two matches and scored two goals.

After 1992 he played for the Belarus national team.

After retiring he became the head coach at the Belarusian women's club BNTU Minsk. With the club he has won the Belarusian Women's Handball Championship and Cup several times.
