= Nerea Pena =

Spanish handball player (born 1989)

Personal information
- Full name: Nerea Pena Abaurrea
- Nationality: Spanish
- Born: 13 December 1989 (age 36) Pamplona, Spain
- Height: 1.75 m (5 ft 9 in)

Sport
- Sport: Handball
- Position: Centre back
- Current club: Vipers Kristiansand
- Number: 25

Senior clubs
- Years: Team
- 2008–2012: SD Itxako
- 2012–2019: Ferencvárosi TC
- 2019–2020: Siófok KC
- 2020–2021: Team Esbjerg
- 2021–2023: Vipers Kristiansand
National team
Years	Team	Apps	(Gls)
2008–	Spain	165	(553)

Teams managed
- 2025–: Szent István SE
Medal record
World Championship
Silver medal – second place	2019 Japan
Bronze medal – third place	2011 Brazil
European Championship
Silver medal – second place	2014 Croatia/Hungary

Nerea Pena Abaurrea (born 13 December 1989) is a Spanish handball coach and former player for the Spanish national team. She is currently coaching Szent István SE.

She participated at the 2010 European Women's Handball Championship, where Spain placed 11th, and Penea was voted into the All-Star Team.

She participated at the 2011 World Women's Handball Championship in Brazil, where Spain placed third.

== Achievements ==
- EHF Champions League:
  - Winner: 2021/2022, 2022/2023
  - Finalist: 2010/2011
- Norwegian League:
  - Winner: 2021/2022, 2022/2023
- Norwegian Cup:
  - Winner: 2021, 2022/23

== Individual awards ==
- All-Star Right Back of the European Championship: 2010
- Nemzeti Bajnokság I Top Scorer: 2014/15 season
- MVP of the Baia Mare Champions Trophy: 2014
