= Anastasiya Kulak =

Belarusian handball player

Anastasiya Mazgo
Personal information
- Nationality: Belarusian
- Born: 4 January 1995 (age 31) Lepel, Belarus
- Height: 1.82 m (6 ft 0 in)

Sport
- Sport: Handball
- Position: Left back
- Current club: BNTU-BelAZ Minsk Region
- Number: 47

Senior clubs
- Years: Team
- 2022-: CSKA
National team
- Years: Team
- 2014-: Belarus

Anastasiya Kulak (née Mazgo; born 4 January 1995) is a Belarusian handballer who plays for CSKA and the Belarus national team.

== International honours ==
- Belarusian Championship:
  - Winner: 2013, 2014, 2015
  - Silver Medalist: 2016, 2017
