= Dziyana Ilyina =

Belarusian handball player

Personal information
- Nationality: Belarusian
- Born: 4 January 1996 (age 30) Gomel, Belarus
- Height: 1.74 m (5 ft 9 in)

Sport
- Sport: Handball
- Position: Centre back
- Current club: Gloria Buzău
- Number: 21

Senior clubs
- Years: Team
- 2012–2014: HC Gomel
- 2014–2016: HC Astrakhanochka
- 2016–2017: HC Vardar
- 2017–2018: HC Dunărea Brăila
- 2018–2019: Gloria Buzău
- 2019–2021: Gloria Bistrița
- 2021–2022: RK Podravka Koprivnica
- 2022–: Gloria Buzău
National team
- Years: Team
- 2013-: Belarus

Dziyana Ilyina (born 4 January 1996) is a Belarusian handballer for Gloria Buzău and the Belarus national team.

== Achievements ==
- Russian Super League:
  - Winner: 2016
  - Bronze Medalist: 2015
- Belarusian Championship:
  - Silver Medalist: 2015
  - Winner: 2016
- Macedonian First League:
  - Winner: 2017
- Macedonian Cup
  - Winner: 2017
- EHF Champions League:
  - Silver Medalist: 2017
- Croatian League
  - Silver Medalist: 2022
- Croatian Cup
  - Winner:'2022
