= Mirjeta Bajramoska =

Macedonian handball player

Personal information
- Full name: Mirjeta Bajramoska
- Nationality: Macedonian
- Born: 22 November 1984 (age 41) Bitola, SR Macedonia, Yugoslavia
- Height: 1.79 m (5 ft 10 in)

Sport
- Sport: Handball
- Position: Left Back
- Current club: ŽRK Vardar
- Number: 13
National team
Years	Team	Apps	(Gls)
–	Macedonia	53	(83)
- Updated on 6 June 2012

Mirjeta Bajramoska (Macedonian: Мирјета Бајрамоска; Albanian: Mirjeta Bajrami; born 22 November 1984 in Bitola, Socialist Republic of Macedonia) is a retired Macedonian handball player that played for ŽRK Vardar and for the North Macedonia women's national handball team. She is of Albanian descent, and her surname had the oska suffix added during the Yugoslavia period of time. Her surname is Bajrami originally.

She plays in left back position.

In the season 2009/10, playing for ŽRK Metalurg, she was top scorer in the Challenge Cup, scoring 69 goals.

== Individual awards ==
- Top Scorer of the Baia Mare Champions Trophy: 2014
