= Paula Ungureanu =

Romanian handball player (born 1980)

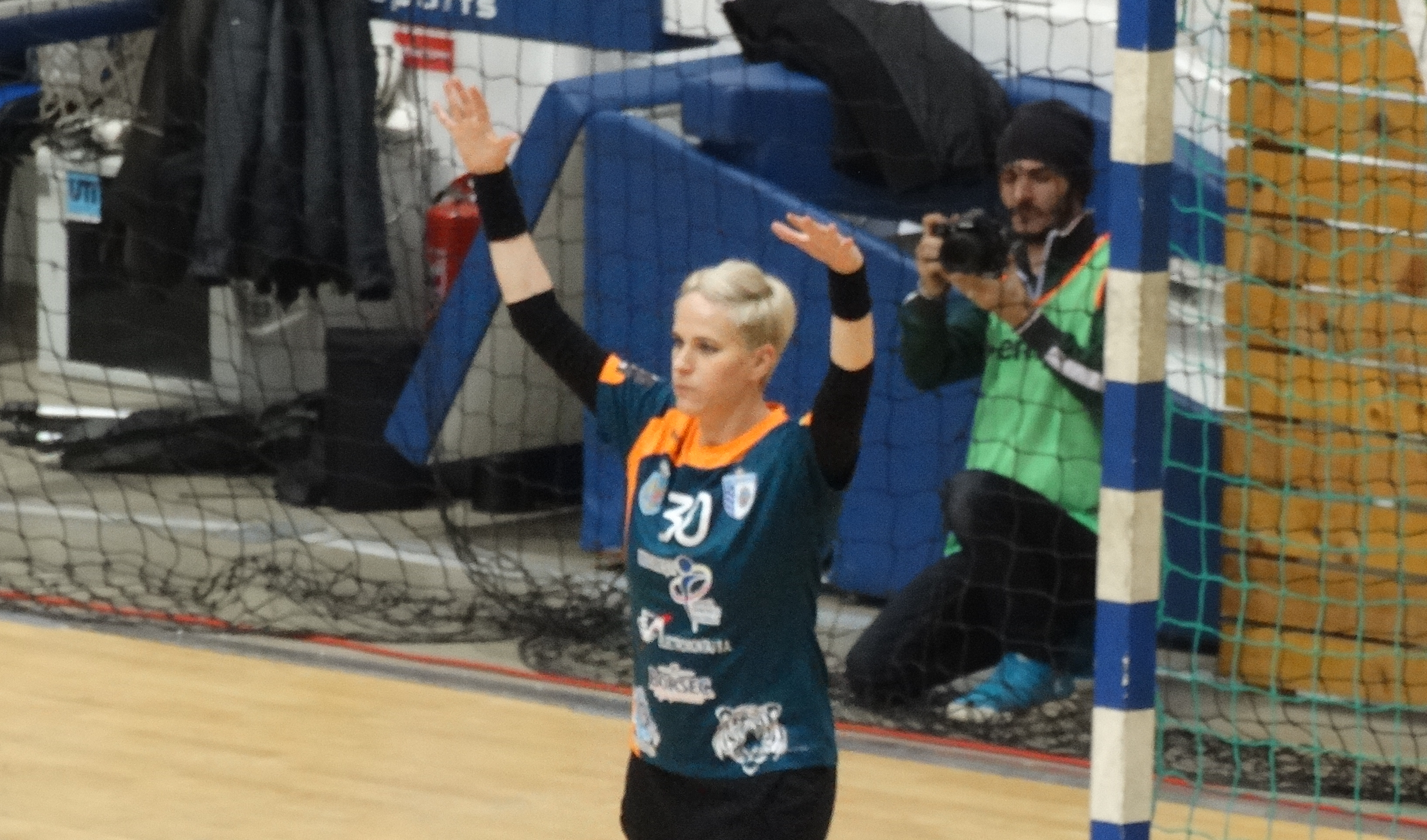
- Ungureanu in 2017 with CSM

Personal information
- Full name: Paula-Claudia Ungureanu
- Nationality: Romanian
- Born: 30 March 1980 (age 46) Braşov, Romania
- Height: 1.80 m (5 ft 11 in)

Sport
- Sport: Handball
- Position: Goalkeeper
- Current club: Rapid București

Senior clubs
- Years: Team
- 1998–2002: Rulmentul Brașov
- 2002–2004: Universitatea Remin Deva
- 2004–2006: Hypo Niederösterreich
- 2006–2008: Dunaferr NK
- 2008–2009: Podravka Koprivnica
- 2009–2013: Oltchim Râmnicu Vâlcea
- 2013–2016: HCM Baia Mare
- 2016–2019: CSM București
- 2019: Rapid București
National team
Years	Team	Apps	(Gls)
2004–2016	Romania	163	(2)
Medal record
World Championship
Silver medal – second place	2005 Russia
Bronze medal – third place	2015 Denmark
European Championship
Bronze medal – third place	2010 Denmark/Norway

Paula-Claudia Ungureanu (née Rădulescu; born 30 March 1980) is a Romanian handballer who plays for Rapid București. She retired from the Romania national team in 2016.

Ungureanu successfully replaced Luminița Dinu after her retirement. Shortly after taking these positions she became known for a high percentage of saves in games and for managing difficult saves in key points of games. Paula Ungureanu ranked fourth on the Top Goalkeepers list of the 2009 World Women's Handball Championship with a 41% save rate. In the 2014 European Championship, she ranked second after Silje Solberg on the Top Goalkeepers list with a 40% save rate.

== Honours ==
=== Clubs ===
- Austrian Championship:
  - Champion: 2005, 2006
- Austrian Cup:
  - Winner: 2005, 2006
- Hungarian Championship
  - Runner-up: 2008
- Hungarian Cup
  - Finalist: 2008
- Croatian Championship
  - Champion: 2009
- Croatian Cup:
  - Winner: 2009
- Romanian Championship
  - Champion: 2010, 2011, 2012, 2013, 2014, 2017
- Romanian Cup
  - Winner: 2011, 2014, 2015
- Romanian Supercup
  - Winner: 2014, 2015
  - Finalist: 2018
- Champions League:
  - Silver Medalist: 2010
  - Bronze Medalist: 2017, 2018

=== National team ===
- World Championship:
  - Silver Medalist: 2005
  - Bronze Medalist: 2015
- European Championship:
  - Bronze Medalist: 2010

== Individual awards ==
- Carpathian Trophy Best Goalkeeper: 2010, 2012
- Romanian Handballer of the Year: 2012, 2014
- Memoriálu Tomáša Jakubču Best Goalkeeper: 2013
- Team of the Tournament Goalkeeper of the Trofeul Maramureș: 2013
- Baia Mare Champions Trophy Best Goalkeeper: 2014
- Team of the Tournament Goalkeeper of the Baia Mare Champions Trophy: 2014
- Handball-Planet.com Best Goalkeeper: 2015
- Romanian Liga Națională Best Romanian Player: 2015, 2016
- Prosport All-Star Goalkeeper of the Romanian Liga Națională: 2017
