= Beyza Karaçam =

Turkish handball player (born 2000)

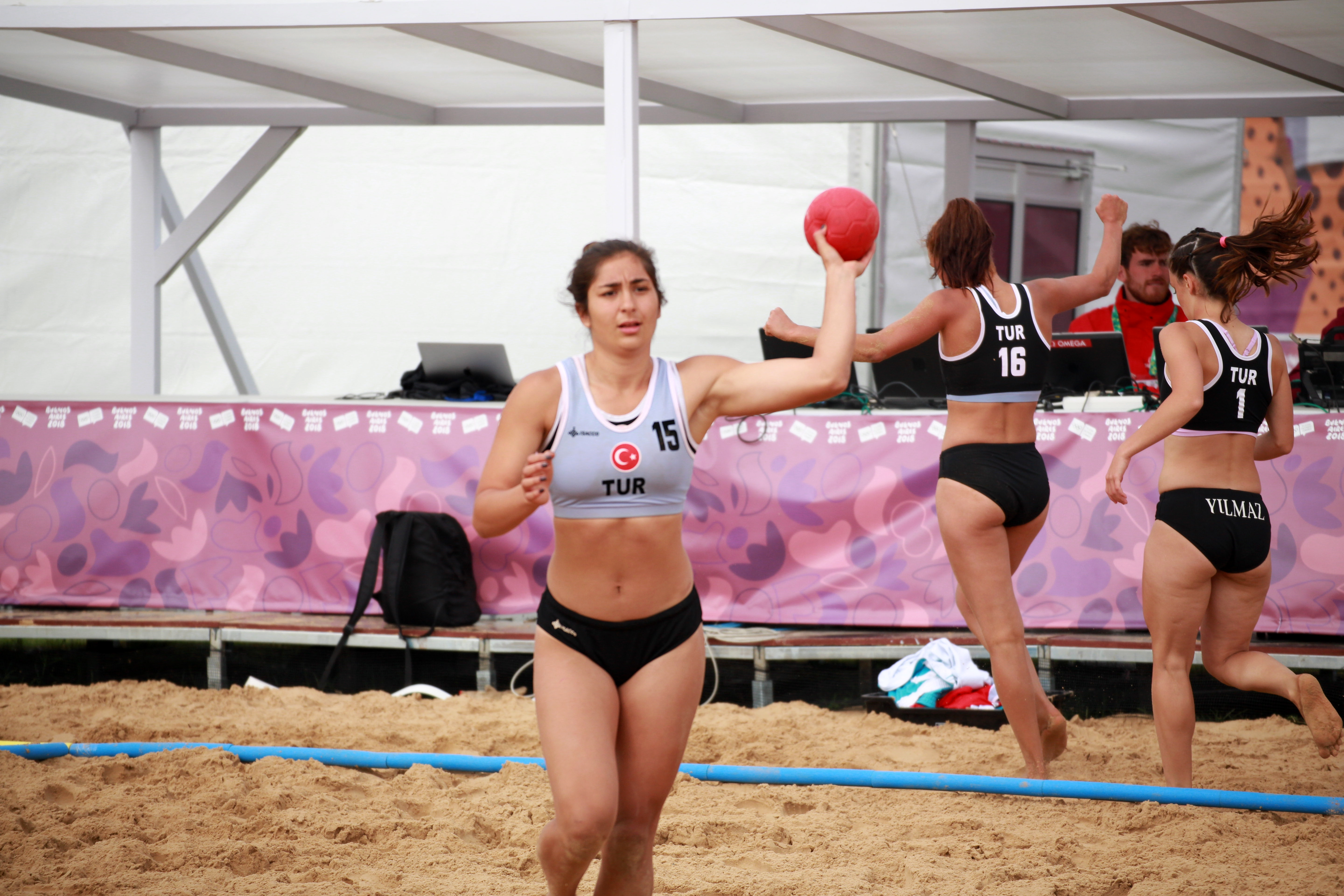
- Beyza Karaçam (October 2018)

Personal information
- Born: 15 December 2000 (age 25) Samsun, Turkey
- Height: 1.76 m (5 ft 9 in)

Sport
- Sport: Handball
- Position: Right back
- Current club: IFK Kristianstad

Senior clubs
- Years: Team
- 2018–2019: Samsun GSK
- 2019–2020: Görele Bld. SK
- 2020–2022: Yenimahalle Bld. SK
- 2022–: IFK Kristianstad
- 2024–: Yalıkavak SK
National team
- Years: Team
- 2019–: Turkey
- 2018: Turkey U-19 beach handball
- 2019–: Turkey beach handball
Medal record
Representing Turkey
Women's Handball
Islamic Solidarity Games
Gold medal – first place	2021 Konya	Team

Beyza Karaçam Gedik (born 15 December 2000), also known as Beyza Gedik, is a Turkish women's handballer, who plays as right back for IFK Kristianstad in the Swedish Handbollsligan, and the Turkey national team as well as the Turkey women's national beach handball team.

== Personal life ==
Beyza Karaçam (Gedik) was born in Samsun, northern Turkey on 15 December 2000.

== Club career ==
Karaçam is 1.76 m (5 ft 9 1/2 in) tall at 70 kg (150 lb).

She was with her hometown club Samsun GSK in the 2018–19 Turkish Women's Handball Super League season

She then transferred to Görele Bld. SK in Giresun for the 2019–20 Turkish Super League season. She played for the Ankara-based club Yenimahalle Bld. SK in the 2020–21 and 2021–22 Turkish Super League seasons. She took part in the 2021–22 EHF European Cup.

In February 2022, she signed a deal with the Swedish club IFK Kristianstad to play in the Handbollsligan.

Returned to home country, she transferred to Yalıkavak SK in Bodum for the 2024–25 Turkish Women's Handball Super League season. She won the champion title at the end of the season play-offs.

== International career ==
=== National handball team ===
Karaçam is a member of the Turkey women's national handball team. She played at the World Women's Handball Championship – European qualification in 2019, 2021, and 2023, as well as at the 2020 European Championship qualification. She was part of the national team at the 2022 Mediterranean Games in Oran, Algeria. In 2022, she won the gold medal at the Islamic Solidarity Games in Konya, Turkey.

She took part at the 2024 European Women's Handball Championship, where the national team debuted.

=== National beach handball team ===
Karaçam played for the Turkey women's national beach handball team at the 2018 Summer Youth Olympics in Buenos Aires, Argentina, at the European Women's Beach Handball Championship in 2019 in, Stare Jabłonki, Poland, and 2021 in Varna, Bulgaria.

== Honours ==
=== Club ===
Turkish Women's Handball Super League

Yenimahalle Bld. SK
Third place (1): 2020–21.

Yalıkavak SK
Champions (1): 2024–25.

=== International ===
Turkey women's national handball team

Islamic Solidarity Games
Champion (1): 2021.
