= HC Victoria-Berestie =

Women's handball club from Brest, Belarus

Handball Club Victoria-Berestie
- Full name: ОО ГК "ЦОР "Виктория-Берестье"
- Founded: 2007
- Arena: Universal Sports Complex Victoria
- Capacity: 3,740
- Head coach: (Ukraine) Vasil Kozar
- League: Belarusian Women's Handball Championship
- 2020/21: 3rd place, bronze medalist(s)
- Club colours

HC Victoria-Berestie is a handball club from Brest, Belarus. It currently competes in the Belarusian Women's Handball Championship, the Cup of Belarus and the Domestic - Brest Christmas Cup.

== Head coaches ==
- 2020 - (Ukraine) Vasil Kozar

== European Cups performance ==
| Season | Competition | Stage | Club | 1st game | 2nd game | Total score |
|---|---|---|---|---|---|---|
| 2011/2012 | Women's EHF Challenge Cup | Second Qualifying Round | (Belgium) Femina Vise | 39:27 | 27:25 | 66:52 |
| 2011/2012 | Women's EHF Challenge Cup | Last 16 | (Czech Republic) DHK Banik Most | 26:32 | 24:35 | 50:67 |
| 2020/2021 | EHF European Cup | Third Qualifying Round | (Kosovo) KHF Istogu | 30:33 | 32:28 | 62:61 |
| 2020/2021 | EHF European Cup | Last 16 | (Ukraine) Galychanka | 26:32 | 16:29 | 42:61 |
| 2021/2022 | EHF European Cup | Third Qualifying Round | (Italy) SSV Brixen Sudtirol | 35:33 | 22:27 | 57:60 |

== Accomplishments ==
Women's EHF Challenge Cup:

- 1/8 (1x): 2011/12, 2020/21

Belarusian Women's Handball Championship:

- 3rd place (2x (bronze) ): 2017, 2021

=== Other ===
Best striker of Belarus:

- 1x (gold) : 2017 - Elena Alekseyuk 310 goals

== Performance history ==
| Season | Belarus Championship | Belarus Cup | EHF Challenge Cup | Brest Christmas Cup |
|---|---|---|---|---|
| 2007/2008 | 8 | | | |
| 2008/2009 | 6 | | | |
| 2009/2010 | 8 | 1/4 | | |
| 2010/2011 | 4 | 1/4 | | |
| 2011/2012 | 5 | 4 | 1/8 | |
| 2012/2013 | 9 | 1/4 | | |
| 2013/2014 | 4 | 3rd place, bronze medalist(s) | | |
| 2014/2015 | 4 | 4 | | |
| 2015/2016 | 5 | 3rd place, bronze medalist(s) | | |
| 2016/2017 | 3rd place, bronze medalist(s) | 3rd place, bronze medalist(s) | | |
| 2017/2018 | 5 | 1/4 | | |
| 2018/2019 | 5 | 3rd place, bronze medalist(s) | | 2nd place, silver medalist(s) |
| 2019/2020 | 4 | 1/4 | | 2nd place, silver medalist(s) |
| 2020/2021 | 3rd place, bronze medalist(s) | 2nd place, silver medalist(s) | 1/8 | Cancelled - Covid-19|- |
