= HPC Arkatron =

Belarusian handball club

HPC Arkatron Minsk
- Full name: ГПК" Аркатрон
- Founded: 1995; 31 years ago
- Dissolved: 2014; 12 years ago
- League: Belarusian Men's Handball Championship

HPC Arkatron Minsk (ГПК" Аркатрон) was a Belarusian handball club founded in 1995 based in Minsk. They had both a women's and men's team. The men's team won the domestic championship in 2003.

The team was disbanded in 2014.

== Titles ==
=== Women's ===
- Belarusian Women's Handball Championship
  - Third place: 2000, 2001, 2002, 2003, 2004, 2008, 2010, 2011, 2012

=== Men's ===
- Belarusian Men's Handball Championship
  - Winner: 2003
  - Second place: 2001, 2002
- Belarusian Men's Handball Cup
  - Winner: 1997, 2002, 2003

== Historical names ==
- 2000-2007 Arkatron Minsk
- 2007-2011 ARKATRON Minsk
- 2011- HPC Arkatron Minsk

== Notable players ==
Men

- Sergei Gorbok 1994 - 2003
- Ivan Matskevich - 2011
- Dzmitry Nikulenkau 2002 - 2004
- Dzianis Rutenka 2002 - 2004
- Siarhei Rutenka 1998 - 2000
- Maxim Babichev 2002 - 2006 and 2007–2009
- Vitali Kazhaneuski, scored 22 goals in a single EHF Challenge Cup game playing for the club

Women

- Elena Abramovich 1999 - 2004
- Anastasia Lobach 2003 - 2005 and 2010 - 2011
