= Belarusian Men's Handball Championship =

- Founded: 1992; 34 years ago
- No. of teams: 12
- Country: Belarus
- Confederation: EHF
- Most recent champions: HC Meshkov Brest (17th title)
- Most titles: HC Meshkov Brest (17 titles)
- Broadcaster: Belarus 5
- Level on pyramid: 1
- International cups: EHF Champions League; EHF European League; EHF European Cup
- Website: handball.by

The Belarusian Men's Handball Championship is the national league for team handball in Belarus. The current champions are HC Meshkov Brest, who won 17th title in 2025/26 season.

The tournament was founded in 1992 to replace the Soviet Men's Handball Championship after the dissolution of the Soviet Union. After the launching of the 2022 Russian invasion of Ukraine, the European Handball Federation in February 2022 temporarily suspended the teams from Belarus.

== 2025-26 Season participants ==
The following 16 clubs compete in the championship during the 2025–26 season.

Team	City	Arena	Address
Meshkov Brest	Brest	Universal Sports Complex "Victoria"	Brest, Leningradskaya str., 4
SKA Minsk	Minsk	Sports Palace "Uruchje"	Minsk, Independence av., 196
Handball Club Gomel	Gomel	GRCOR for game's types of sports	Gomel, Irininskaya st., 16-2
Kronon Grodno	Grodno	Sports Complex "Victoria"	Grodno, Gagarina str., 18/1
Masheka Mogilev	Mogilev	SC "Olympian"	Mogilev, 30 years of Victory str., 1a
BSUFC-SKA-RGUOR	Minsk	House of handball	Minsk, Filimonova str., 55/2
MAZ-Orsha	Orsha	Base of the ag. sports and health complex. Babinichi	Babinichi, Sportivnaya str., 36
MOHK	Dzyarzhynsk	Olimp	Dzyarzhynsk, Mira str.,
RGUOR-Belarus-2008	Minsk	RCOR	Minsk, Filimonova str., 55/2
Sdyushor-Victoria	Brest, Belarus	Universal Sports Complex "Victoria"	Brest, Leningradskaya str., 4
RCOR	Minsk	RCOR	Minsk, Filimonova str., 55/2
SKA-UNI	Minsk	RCOR	Minsk, Filimonova str., 55/2
Handball club Amatary	Minsk	RCOR	Minsk, Filimonova str., 55/2
Handball club Gomel 2	Gomel	GRCOR for game's types of sports	Gomel, Irininskaya st., 16-2
Kronon-Sdyushor	Grodno	Sports Complex "Victoria"	Grodno, Gagarina str., 18/1
Masheka Mogilev 2	Mogilev	SC "Olympian"	Mogilev, 30 years of Victory str., 1a

== List of champions ==
- 1993 : SKA Minsk
- 1994 : SKA Minsk (2)
- 1995 : SKA Minsk (3)
- 1996 : SKA Minsk (4)
- 1997 : SKA Minsk (5)
- 1998 : SKA Minsk (6)
- 1999 : SKA Minsk (7)
- 2000 : SKA Minsk (8)
- 2001 : SKA Minsk (9)
- 2002 : SKA Minsk (10)
- 2003 : HPC Arkatron Minsk
- 2004 : Meshkov Brest
- 2005 : Meshkov Brest (2)
- 2006 : Meshkov Brest (3)
- 2007 : Meshkov Brest (4)
- 2008 : Meshkov Brest (5)
- 2009 : Dinamo Minsk
- 2010 : Dinamo Minsk (2)
- 2011 : Dinamo Minsk (3)
- 2012 : Dinamo Minsk (4)
- 2013 : Dinamo Minsk (5)
- 2014 : Meshkov Brest (6)
- 2015 : Meshkov Brest (7)
- 2016 : Meshkov Brest (8)
- 2017 : Meshkov Brest (9)
- 2018 : Meshkov Brest (10)
- 2019 : Meshkov Brest (11)
- 2020 : Meshkov Brest (12)
- 2021 : Meshkov Brest (13)
- 2022 : Meshkov Brest (14)
- 2023 : Meshkov Brest (15)
- 2024 : Meshkov Brest (16)
- 2025 : SKA Minsk (11)
- 2026 : Meshkov Brest (17)

	Club	Titles	Year
1.	Meshkov Brest	17	2004, 2005, 2006, 2007, 2008, 2014, 2015, 2016, 2017, 2018, 2019, 2020, 2021, 2022, 2023, 2024, 2026.
2.	SKA Minsk	11	1993, 1994, 1995, 1996, 1997, 1998, 1999, 2000, 2001, 2002, 2025
3.	Dinamo Minsk	5	2009, 2010, 2011, 2012, 2013
4.	HPC Arkatron Minsk	1	2003

== Results of the 2025-26 season ==
Gold medal	Silver medal	Bronze medal
Meshkov Brest; 17th time	Ska Minsk; 18th time	Masheka; 4th time
