= Maxim Babichev =

Belarusian handball player

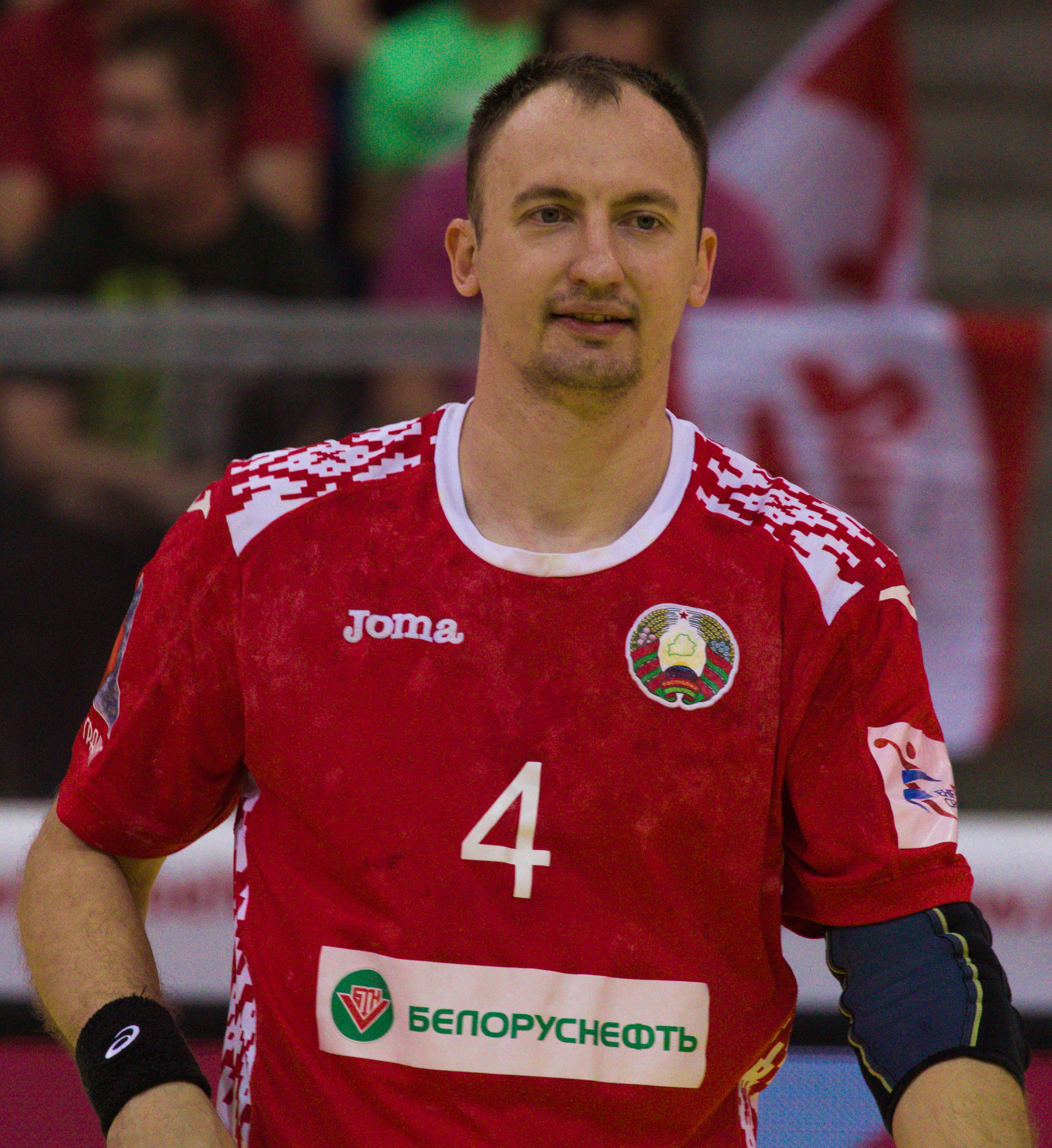

Personal information
- Nationality: Belarusian
- Born: 7 March 1986 (age 40) Minsk, Belarus
- Height: 2.00 m (6 ft 7 in)

Sport
- Sport: Handball
- Position: Pivot
- Current club: Motor Zaporizhzhia
- Number: 6

Senior clubs
- Years: Team
- 2002–2006: Arkatron
- 2006–2007: BGUFK Minsk
- 2007–2009: Arkatron
- 2009–2014: Dinamo Minsk
- 2014–2017: Meshkov Brest
- 2017–2021: Motor Zaporizhzhia
National team
Years	Team	Apps	(Gls)
–	Belarus	144	(238)

Maxim Babichev (born 7 March 1986) is a Belarusian handball player for Motor Zaporizhzhia and the Belarusian national team.
