= Tetyana Trehubová =

Ukrainian-born Slovak handball player (born 1989)

Personal information
- Nationality: Slovak; Ukrainian
- Born: 14 March 1989 (age 37) Uzhhorod, Ukrainian SSR, Soviet Union
- Height: 1.74 m (5 ft 9 in)

Sport
- Sport: Handball
- Position: Right back
- Current club: IUVENTA Michalovce
- Number: 55

Senior clubs
- Years: Team
- –: HC Karpaty Uzhhorod
- –: Galytchanka Lviv
- –: IUVENTA Michalovce
National team
Years	Team	Apps	(Gls)
–	Slovakia	8	(39)

Tetyana Trehubová (born 14 March 1989) is a Ukrainian-born Slovak handball player who plays for IUVENTA Michalovce and the Slovak national team.
