= Belarus women's national handball team =

Belarus

Information
- Association: Belarus Handball Association
- Coach: Leanid Brazinski

Colours
1st	2nd

Results

World Championship
- Appearances: 2 (First in 1997)
- Best result: 14th (1999)

European Championship
- Appearances: 4 (First in 2000)
- Best result: 11th (2000)
- Last updated on 14 December 2011.

The Belarus women's national handball team is the national team of Belarus. It is governed by the Belarusian Handball Federation and takes part in international team handball competitions.

In light of the launching of the 2022 Russian invasion of Ukraine, the European Handball Federation in February 2022 temporarily suspended Belarus both in competitions for national teams and on the club level. The International Handball Federation banned Belarus athletes and officials. Referees, officials, and commission members from Belarus will not be called upon for future activities.

== Results ==
=== World Championship ===
- 1997 – 16th
- 1999 – 14th

=== European Championship ===
- 2000 – 11th
- 2002 – 16th
- 2004 – 16th
- 2008 – 12th

== Current squad ==
The squad chosen for two qualification matches against Wales for the 2017 World Women's Handball Championship.

Head Coach: Leanid Brazinski

No.	Pos.	Name	Date of birth (age)	Height	App.	Goals	Club
1	GK	Volha Nikitsina	21 July 1996 (age 29)	0.00 m	0	0	(Belarus) BNTU Minsk
2	P	Iryna Tryzno	23 April 1994 (age 31)	1.78 m	0	0	(Norway) Molde Elite
3	CB	Valiantsina Nestsiaruk	30 May 1988 (age 37)	1.70 m	0	0	(Poland) MKS Selgros Lublin
4	LB	Anastasiya Mazgo	4 January 1995 (age 30)	1.82 m	0	0	(Belarus) BNTU Minsk
5	LW	Iryna Dronova	9 February 1981 (age 44)	1.86 m	0	0	(Belarus) HC Gomel
6	RW	Yana Yemelyanenka	2 January 1992 (age 33)	0.00 m	0	0	(Russia) HC Astrakhanochka
7	RW	Natallia Vasileuskaya	23 February 1991 (age 34)	1.75 m	0	0	(Belarus) HC Gorodnichanka
8	CB	Dziyana Ilyina	4 January 1996 (age 29)	0.00 m	0	0	(Romania) HC Dunărea Brăila
9	LW	Nataliya Kotsina	7 September 1991 (age 34)	1.75 m	0	0	(Turkey) Muratpaşa Bld. SK
11	LB	Liliya Artsiukhovich	21 August 1987 (age 38)	1.80 m	0	0	(Belarus) BNTU Minsk
12	GK	Valiantsina Kumpel	11 November 1989 (age 35)	1.80 m	0	0	(Belarus) HC Gomel
13	RW	Khrystyna Azolina	1 January 1991 (age 34)	0.00 m	0	0	(Belarus) BNTU Minsk
17	P	Anastasia Lobach	25 June 1997 (age 28)	1.78 m	0	0	(Romania) CSM București
21	RB	Karyna Yezhykava	8 July 1990 (age 35)	1.80 m	0	0	(Hungary) Debreceni VSC
22	RB	Katsiaryna Silitskaya	14 July 1993 (age 32)	0.00 m	0	0	(Norway) Molde Elite
23	P	Viktoriya Shamanouskaya	8 August 1993 (age 32)	0.00 m	0	0	(Belarus) HC Gomel
