= Karyna Yezhykava =

Belarusian handball player

Personal information
- Nationality: (Belarus) Belarusian
- Born: 7 August 1990 (age 36) Gomel, Belarus
- Height: 1.80 m (5 ft 11 in)

Sport
- Sport: Handball
- Position: Centre Back

Senior clubs
- Years: Team
- –2013: BNTU Minsk
- 2013–2016: HC Astrakhanochka
- 2016–2018: Debreceni VSC
- 2018–2019: RK Podravka Koprivnica
- 2019–2021: HC Astrakhanochka
- 2021–2022: Debreceni VSC
National team
- Years: Team
- –: Belarus

Karyna Yezhykava (born 7 August 1990 in Gomel), is a former Belarusian female handballer. She was a player for the Belarusian national team.

== Achievements ==
- EHF Cup:
  - Semifinalist: 2014
