= Karolina Sparnauskaitė =

Lithuanian handball player (born 1999)

Personal information
- Nationality: Lithuanian
- Born: 26 August 1999 (age 27)
- Height: 1.70 m (5 ft 7 in)

Sport
- Sport: Handball
- Current club: HC SM Garliava
National team
- Years: Team
- 2019–: Lithuania

Karolina Sparnauskaitė (born 26 August 1999) is a Lithuanian handball player who currently plays for Lithuanian club HC SM Garliava and the Lithuania national team.

== Awards ==
- 2020 Lithuanian Female Handball Player of the Year
