= Leonora Demaj =

Danish-Kosovan handball player (born 1997)

Personal information
- Nationality: Danish/Kosovan
- Born: 25 August 1997 (age 29) Hvidovre, Denmark
- Height: 1.78 m (5 ft 10 in)

Sport
- Sport: Handball
- Position: Left Back
- Current club: Ringkøbing Håndbold
- Number: 77

Senior clubs
- Years: Team
- 2014–2017: Nykøbing Falster HK
- 2017–2020: SønderjyskE Håndbold
- 2020–: Vendsyssel Håndbold
National team
Years	Team	Apps	(Gls)
2017–	Kosovo	18	(161)
- Updated on 8 August 2024

Leonora Demaj (born 25 August 1997) is a Danish-Kosovan handball player for Vendsyssel Håndbold and the Kosovan national team.

She is the captain of the Kosovan national team, and holds the record for most goals ever on the Kosovan national team.
