= Kosovo women's national handball team =

Kosovo

Information
- Nickname: Dardanët
- Association: Kosovo Handball Federation (Federata e Hendbollit e Kosovës – FHK)
- Coach: Agron Shabani
- Captain: Leonora Demaj
- Most caps: Aida Stagova (27)
- Most goals: Leonora Demaj (121)

Colours
1st	2nd

Results

Handball at the Mediterranean Games
- Appearances: 1 (First in 2026)
- Last updated on 21/08/2026.

The Kosovo women's national handball team represents Kosovo in international women's handball and is controlled by the Handball Federation of Kosovo. The national handball team started competing in international competition in 2015, following Kosovo's full status recognition from the International Handball Federation (IHF).

== History ==
Handball first arrived in Kosovo in the late 1940s, and by 1948 there were several registered clubs starting to compete in informal domestic competitions. By 1951, indoor handball was introduced. Two years later, in 1953 Kosovo Handball Federation was founded, under the auspices of the Yugoslav Handball Federation.

In 1979, whilst part of the former Yugoslavia, Kosovo hosted the 1979 Women's Junior World Handball Championship.

Following the breakdown of Yugoslavia and subsequent independence of Kosovo as a nation, Kosovo Handball Federation began operating independently.

In 2014, six years after Kosovo declared independence, the European Handball Federation (EHF) recognised Kosovo as a full member state and immediately the Kosovo national handball team started competing in international competition.

== Team ==
=== Current squad ===
The following players were selected to participate at the 2022 European Women's Handball Championship qualification matches, between 3 and 5 June, 2021.

Matches and goals as of 27 April 2022.

Head coach: Agron Shabani

No.	Pos.	Name	Date of birth (age)	Height	App.	Goals	Club
1	GK	Njomëza Kelmendi	24 March 1994 (age 32)	170	19	1	(Kosovo) KHF Vushtrria
2	LW	Alberina Halitaj	27 March 2000 (age 26)	161	3	0	(Kosovo) KHF Istogu
3	RW	Areta Istrefi		172	4	3	(Germany) PSV Recklinghausen
5	LB	Elma Kameri	15 April 1997 (age 29)	178	18	25	(Kosovo) KHF Istogu
7	LB	Mirela Gjikokaj	17 March 1999 (age 27)	180	23	83	(Norway) Follo HK Damer
8	LB	Burneta Rama	22 February 1990 (age 36)	174	9	29	(Kosovo) KHF Vushtrria
10	RW	Fitore Aliu	11 October 1999 (age 26)	173	20	36	(Germany) SG Kappelwindeck
11	LB	Arlinda Hajdari		173	7	22	(Denmark) Ringkøbing Håndbold
12	GK	Rinesa Uka	30 January 2001 (age 25)	175	7	1	(Kosovo) KHF Prishtina
14	LW	Pashke Marku		173	11	27	(Switzerland) HSC Kreuzlingen
15	LW	Albina Rugova	30 May 1997 (age 29)	167	22	37	(Kosovo) KHF Istogu
17	LW	Aida Stagova	7 March 1995 (age 31)	165	27	20	(Kosovo) KHF Prishtina
24	RB	Mirjeta Bytyqi		165	4	9	(Slovenia) ZRK Mlinotest Adjovscina
27	CB	Marigona Hajdari		180	9	24	(Denmark) Ringkøbing Håndbold
28	LB	Alma Nivokazi	16 April 2002 (age 24)	165	3	1	(Kosovo) KHF Prishtina
33	GK	Blerta Ahmetxhekaj	3 September 2001 (age 24)	180	7	0	(Kosovo) KHF Istogu
44	PV	Suzana Ujkiç	16 September 1993 (age 32)	176	9	18	(Kosovo) KHF Istogu
45	CB	Njoma Zogaj		176	1	7	(Denmark) EH Aalborg
77	PV	Meltem Ylberi	15 August 2001 (age 25)	177	7	5	(Switzerland) Spono Eagles

=== Coaches ===
- (Kosovo) Florent Beqiri (2014–2018)
- (Luxembourg) Agron Shabani (2018 - )

=== Captains ===
- Leonora Demaj (2017 - )

=== Individual all-time records ===
==== Most matches played ====
Total number of matches played in official competitions only.

#	Player	Matches	Goals
1	Aida Stagova	27	20
2	Mirela Gjikokaj	23	83
3	Albina Rugova	22	37
4	Fitore Aliu	20	36
5	Njomëza Kelmendi	19	1
6	Elma Kameri	18	25
7	Shkurta Mehmeti	15	17
8	Aurora Shehdadi	15	0
9	Leonora Demaj	13	121
10	Arlinda Krasniqi	13	6

Last updated: 27 April 2022

==== Most goals scored ====
Total number of goals scored in official competitions only.

#	Player	Goals	Matches
1	Leonora Demaj	121	13
2	Mirela Gjikokaj	83	23
3	Albina Rugova	37	22
4	Fitore Aliu	36	20
5	Burneta Rama	29	9
6	Pashke Marku	27	11
7	Elma Kameri	25	18
8	Marigona Hajdari	24	9
9	Albulena Kelmendi	23	5
10	Arlinda Hajdari	22	7

Last updated: 27 April 2022

== Kit suppliers ==
Since 2019, Kosovo's kits have been supplied by Kempa.
