= BNTU Minsk =

Belarusian handball club

BNTU-BelAZ Minsk Region
- Founded: 1974
- Arena: РЦОР по гандболу, Minsk
- Capacity: 500
- Head coach: Konstantin Sharovarov
- League: Belarusian Championship
- 2022–23: 2nd
Home	Away

BNTU-BelAZ Minsk Region, previously Politechnik or BGPA Minsk, is a handball club from Minsk, Belarus. They currently compete in the Belarusian Championship where they are en-titre and multiple champions.

== Titles ==
- Belarusian Championship
  - Winners (24) : 1993, 1994, 1995, 1996, 1997, 1998, 1999, 2000, 2001, 2002, 2003, 2004, 2005, 2006, 2007, 2009, 2010, 2011, 2012, 2013, 2014, 2015, 2018, 2021
  - Runners-up (5): 2008, 2016, 2017, 2019, 2020, 2023
- Belarusian Cup
  - Winners (16) : 1998, 1999, 2000, 2001, 2002, 2003, 2004, 2005, 2006, 2009, 2010, 2011, 2012, 2013, 2014, 2018
  - Finalist (5): 2008, 2015, 2016, 2017, 2019

== European record ==
Season	Competition	Round	Club	1st leg	2nd leg	Aggregate
2016–17	EHF Cup	R1	(Czech Republic) DHK Baník Most	23–28	32–30	55–58
