= HC Gomel =

Belarusian handball club

- Founded: 1960
- Arena: Sport Palast
- Head coach: Andrey Mochalov
- League: Belarusian Championship
- 2022-23: 3rd

HC Gomel is a handball club from Gomel, Belarus. They compete in the Belarusian Men's Handball Championship and in the SEHA League.

== European record ==
Season	Competition	Round	Club	1st leg	2nd leg	Aggregate
2013–14	EHF Cup	R2	(Portugal) ADA Colegio Joao de Barros	24–20	26–23	50–43
2013–14	EHF Cup	R3	(Spain) Rocasa Gran Canaria ACE	20–30	26–26	56–66
2014–15	EHF Cup	R2	(Turkey) Ankara Yenimahalle Bld.	22–33	25–24	47–57
2016–17	EHF Champions League	Q1	(Germany) HC Leipzig	18–29		4th place
2016–17	EHF Champions League	Q1	(Spain) BM Bera Bera	20–28		4th place
2016–17	EHF Cup	R2	(Romania) HC Dunărea Brăila	15–27	22–26	37–53
2017–18	EHF Champions League	Q1	(Norway) Vipers Kristiansand	19–43		3rd place
2017–18	EHF Champions League	Q1	(Turkey) Kastamonu Belediyesi	29–28		3rd place
2017–18	EHF Cup	R3	(Norway) Byåsen HE	28–32	22–27	50–59

== Squad ==
Squad for the 2022–23 season

Goalkeepers

- 12 (Belarus) Vladyslav Sukalo
- 41 (Belarus) Uladzimir Korsak

Left Wingers

- 22 (Belarus) Maksim Krasouski
- 76 (Belarus) Ilya Tamashuk

Right Wingers

- 24 (Belarus) Maksim Karlouski
- 25 (Belarus) Vitaly Zinchanka

Line players

- 30 (Belarus) Mikhail Pilyuk
- 87 (Ukraine) Victor Skrypak

Left Backs

- 3 (Belarus) Dzmitry Biahun
- 5 (Belarus) Andrei Yashchanka
- 77 (Belarus) Ihar Kazhadub

Central Backs

- 27 (Belarus) Siarhei Mikhalchuk
- 88 (Belarus) Siarhei Zhurau

Right Backs

- 19 (Belarus) Ivan Saratouski
- 78 (Belarus) Stanislav Shafalovich
