= Belarusian Women's Handball Championship =

The Belarusian Women's Handball Championship is the premier league for women's handball clubs in Belarus. First held in 1993 following the collapse of the Soviet Union, it has been dominated since by BNTU Minsk, formerly known as Politechnik Minsk and No. 6 Minsk.

Teams in season 2019/20

== List of champions and medalists ==
1993 :

- (gold) Politechnik Minsk
- (silver) WWW Universitet Gomel
- (bronze) RUOR Minsk

1994:

- (gold) Politechnik Minsk
- (silver) WWW Universitet Gomel
- (bronze) Drut Belynychi

1995:

- (gold) Politechnik Minsk
- (silver) Politechnik-2 Minsk
- (bronze) WWW Universitet Gomel

1996:

- (gold) Politechnik Minsk
- (silver) Politechnik-2 Minsk
- (bronze) Universitet Gomel

1997:

- (gold) Politechnik Minsk
- (silver) Politechnik-RSWSM Minsk
- (bronze) Universitet Gomel

1998:

- (gold) Politechnik Minsk
- (silver) Politechnik-RSWSM Minsk
- (bronze) Drut Belynychi

1999:

- (gold) Politechnik Minsk
- (silver) Drut Belynychi
- (bronze) RSWSM-RUOR Minsk

2000:

- (gold) No. 6 Minsk
- (silver) Drut Belynychi
- (bronze) Arkatron Minsk

2001:

- (gold) No. 6 Minsk
- (silver) Drut Belynychi
- (bronze) Arkatron Minsk

2002:

- (gold) No. 6 Minsk
- (silver) Drut Belynychi
- (bronze) Arkatron Minsk

2003:

- (gold) BNTU Minsk
- (silver) HC Gorodnichanka
- (bronze) Arkatron Minsk

2004:

- (gold) BNTU Minsk
- (silver) HC Gorodnichanka
- (bronze) Arkatron Minsk

2005:

- (gold) BNTU Minsk
- (silver) HC Gorodnichanka
- (bronze) Drut Belynychi

2006:

- (gold) BNTU Minsk
- (silver) HC Gorodnichanka
- (bronze) Drut Belynychi

2007:

- (gold) BNTU Minsk
- (silver) HC Gorodnichanka
- (bronze) Drut Belynychi

2008:

- (gold) HC Gorodnichanka
- (silver) BNTU Minsk
- (bronze) Arkatron Minsk

2009:

- (gold) BNTU Minsk
- (silver) HC Gorodnichanka
- (bronze) Drut Belynychi

2010:

- (gold) BNTU Minsk
- (silver) HC Gorodnichanka
- (bronze) Arkatron Minsk

2011:

- (gold) BNTU Minsk
- (silver) HC Gorodnichanka
- (bronze) Arkatron Minsk

2012:

- (gold) BNTU Minsk
- (silver) HC Gorodnichanka
- (bronze) Arkatron Minsk

2013:

- (gold) BNTU Minsk
- (silver) HC Gorodnichanka
- (bronze) HC Gomel

2014:

- (gold) BNTU Minsk
- (silver) HC Gomel
- (bronze) HC Gorodnichanka

2015:

- (gold) BNTU Minsk
- (silver) HC Gomel
- (bronze) HC Gorodnichanka

2016:

- (gold) HC Gomel
- (silver) BNTU Minsk
- (bronze) HC Gorodnichanka

2017:

- (gold) HC Gomel
- (silver) BNTU Minsk
- (bronze) HC Victoria-Berestie

2018:

- (gold) BNTU Minsk
- (silver) HC Gomel
- (bronze) HC Gorodnichanka

2019:

- (gold) HC Gomel
- (silver) BNTU Minsk
- (bronze) HC Gorodnichanka

2020:

- (gold) HC Gomel
- (silver) BNTU Minsk
- (bronze) HC Gorodnichanka

2021:

- (gold) BNTU Minsk
- (silver) HC Gomel
- (bronze) HC Victoria-Berestie

2023:

- (gold) HC Gomel
- (silver) BNTU Minsk
- (bronze) HC Gorodnichanka

== Summary ==
Club	Champion (gold)	2-d place (silver)	3-d place (bronze)
BNTU Minsk	24	5	-
HC Gomel	4	6	4
HC Gorodnichanka	1	9	6
Drut Belynychi	-	4	6
Arkatron Minsk	-	-	9
HC Victoria-Berestie	-	-	2
