= Baia Mare Champions Trophy =

- Current season, competition or edition: 2014 Baia Mare Champions Trophy
- Sport: Handball
- Founded: 2014
- No. of teams: 6
- Most recent champion(s): (Romania) HCM Baia Mare

The Baia Mare Champions Trophy (Romanian: Trofeul Campionilor Baia Mare) was a one-off pre-season international women's team handball tournament for clubs, held in Baia Mare, Romania. The competition was hosted by Liga Naţională club HCM Baia Mare and governed by the rules and regulations of the IHF. It was contested by six teams.

== Tournaments ==
Edition	Year	Winner	Runner-up	Third	Fourth	Fifth	Sixth
1	2014	(Romania) Baia Mare	(Hungary) Ferencváros	(Russia) Astrakhan	(Russia) Rostov	(Slovenia) RK Krim	(Slovakia) IUVENTA

== See also ==
- Bucharest Trophy
