= 2018 European Women's Handball Championship qualification =

The qualification for the 2018 European Women's Handball Championship:

== Qualification system ==
France as host nation was directly qualified. 32 teams had registered for participation and compete for 15 places at the final tournament in two distinct Qualification Phases. The group winners of phase 1 advanced to phase 2. The 28 teams were divided into seven groups of four teams.

== Qualification Phase 1 ==
The groups were played in a tournament format from 9 to 11 June 2017. The group winners advanced to the second phase.

The draw was held on 20 March 2017.

All times are local.

=== Group A ===
| Pos | Team | Pld | W | D | L | GF | GA | GD | Pts | Qualification |
|---|---|---|---|---|---|---|---|---|---|---|
| 1 | Faroe Islands | 2 | 2 | 0 | 0 | 45 | 41 | +4 | 4 | Qualification phase 2 |
| 2 | Greece (H) | 2 | 1 | 0 | 1 | 53 | 45 | +8 | 2 | |
| 3 | Finland | 2 | 0 | 0 | 2 | 37 | 49 | −12 | 0 | |

Source: Eurohandball
Rules for classification: 1) points; 2) head-to-head points; 3) head-to-head goal difference; 4) head-to-head number of goals scored; 5) goal difference.
(H) Hosts

| 9 June 2017; 19:00 | Greece | 29–20 | Finland | O.A.C.A. Olympic Indoor Hall, Athens; Attendance: 700; Referees: Manea, Iliescu (ROU) |
| 9 June 2017; 19:00 | Tsakalou 7 | (16–11) | four players 3 | O.A.C.A. Olympic Indoor Hall, Athens; Attendance: 700; Referees: Manea, Iliescu (ROU) |
| 9 June 2017; 19:00 | 3× (yellow card) 4× (suspension) | Report | 3× (yellow card) 4× (suspension) | O.A.C.A. Olympic Indoor Hall, Athens; Attendance: 700; Referees: Manea, Iliescu (ROU) |

| 10 June 2017; 19:00 | Faroe Islands | 25–24 | Greece | O.A.C.A. Olympic Indoor Hall, Athens; Attendance: 800; Referees: Manea, Iliescu (ROU) |
| 10 June 2017; 19:00 | Armgarðardóttir 9 | (15–10) | Tsakalou 9 | O.A.C.A. Olympic Indoor Hall, Athens; Attendance: 800; Referees: Manea, Iliescu (ROU) |
| 10 June 2017; 19:00 | 3× (yellow card) 6× (suspension) | Report | 3× (yellow card) 3× (suspension) | O.A.C.A. Olympic Indoor Hall, Athens; Attendance: 800; Referees: Manea, Iliescu (ROU) |

| 11 June 2017; 15:00 | Finland | 17–20 | Faroe Islands | O.A.C.A. Olympic Indoor Hall, Athens; Attendance: 300; Referees: Manea, Iliescu (ROU) |
| 11 June 2017; 15:00 | Hilli, Näräkkä 4 | (5–8) | Armgarðardóttir 6 | O.A.C.A. Olympic Indoor Hall, Athens; Attendance: 300; Referees: Manea, Iliescu (ROU) |
| 11 June 2017; 15:00 | 3× (yellow card) 1× (suspension) | Report | 2× (yellow card) 3× (suspension) | O.A.C.A. Olympic Indoor Hall, Athens; Attendance: 300; Referees: Manea, Iliescu (ROU) |

=== Group B ===
| Pos | Team | Pld | W | D | L | GF | GA | GD | Pts | Qualification |
|---|---|---|---|---|---|---|---|---|---|---|
| 1 | Kosovo (H) | 2 | 2 | 0 | 0 | 62 | 44 | +18 | 4 | Qualification phase 2 |
| 2 | Israel | 2 | 1 | 0 | 1 | 56 | 59 | −3 | 2 | |
| 3 | Georgia | 2 | 0 | 0 | 2 | 46 | 61 | −15 | 0 | |

Source: Eurohandball
Rules for classification: 1) points; 2) head-to-head points; 3) head-to-head goal difference; 4) head-to-head number of goals scored; 5) goal difference.
(H) Hosts

| 9 June 2017; 18:00 | Georgia | 27–31 | Israel | Palace of Youth and Sports, Pristina; Attendance: 150; Referees: Markovska, Vutov (BUL) |
| 9 June 2017; 18:00 | Kunelashvili 7 | (10–14) | Ben Itzhak 9 | Palace of Youth and Sports, Pristina; Attendance: 150; Referees: Markovska, Vutov (BUL) |
| 9 June 2017; 18:00 | 3× (yellow card) 5× (suspension) | Report | 3× (yellow card) 7× (suspension) | Palace of Youth and Sports, Pristina; Attendance: 150; Referees: Markovska, Vutov (BUL) |

| 10 June 2017; 18:00 | Kosovo | 30–19 | Georgia | Palace of Youth and Sports, Pristina; Attendance: 650; Referees: Markovska, Vutov (BUL) |
| 10 June 2017; 18:00 | Demaj 11 | (16–7) | three players 4 | Palace of Youth and Sports, Pristina; Attendance: 650; Referees: Markovska, Vutov (BUL) |
| 10 June 2017; 18:00 | 3× (yellow card) 4× (suspension) | Report | 3× (yellow card) 4× (suspension) 1× (red card) | Palace of Youth and Sports, Pristina; Attendance: 650; Referees: Markovska, Vutov (BUL) |

| 11 June 2017; 18:00 | Israel | 25–32 | Kosovo | Palace of Youth and Sports, Pristina; Attendance: 700; Referees: Markovska, Vutov (BUL) |
| 11 June 2017; 18:00 | Vakrat 6 | (12–12) | Demaj 16 | Palace of Youth and Sports, Pristina; Attendance: 700; Referees: Markovska, Vutov (BUL) |
| 11 June 2017; 18:00 | 3× (yellow card) 6× (suspension) 1× (red card) | Report | 3× (yellow card) 5× (suspension) | Palace of Youth and Sports, Pristina; Attendance: 700; Referees: Markovska, Vutov (BUL) |

== Qualification Phase 2 ==
The groups were played in a home and away round-robin format from September 2017 to June 2018. The top two teams qualified for the main tournament as well as the best-ranked third placed team, where the results against the last-placed team were revoked.

The draw was held on 21 April 2017.

=== Seeding ===
| Pot 1 | Pot 2 | Pot 3 | Pot 4 |
|---|---|---|---|
| Norway; Netherlands; Romania; Denmark; Sweden; Spain; Montenegro | Russia; Germany; Poland; Hungary; Serbia; Czech Republic; Croatia | Slovakia; Slovenia; Ukraine; Austria; Belarus; Turkey; Macedonia | Italy; Iceland; Lithuania; Portugal; Switzerland; Faroe Islands; Kosovo |

All times are local.

=== Group 1 ===
| Pos | Team | Pld | W | D | L | GF | GA | GD | Pts | Qualification |
|---|---|---|---|---|---|---|---|---|---|---|
| 1 | Norway | 6 | 6 | 0 | 0 | 196 | 125 | +71 | 12 | Final tournament |
| 2 | Croatia | 6 | 3 | 0 | 3 | 167 | 160 | +7 | 6 | Final tournament |
| 3 | Switzerland | 6 | 2 | 0 | 4 | 117 | 171 | −54 | 4 | |
| 4 | Ukraine | 6 | 1 | 0 | 5 | 130 | 154 | −24 | 2 | |

Source: Eurohandball
Rules for classification: 1) points; 2) head-to-head points; 3) head-to-head goal difference; 4) head-to-head number of goals scored; 5) goal difference.

| 27 September 2017; 18:00 | Croatia | 32–28 | Switzerland | Športska dvorana Sutinska vrela, Zagreb; Attendance: 250; Referees: Martins, Martins (POR) |
| 27 September 2017; 18:00 | Vidak 7 | (19–12) | Scherer 8 | Športska dvorana Sutinska vrela, Zagreb; Attendance: 250; Referees: Martins, Martins (POR) |
| 27 September 2017; 18:00 | 3× (yellow card) 3× (suspension) | Report | 2× (yellow card) 3× (suspension) | Športska dvorana Sutinska vrela, Zagreb; Attendance: 250; Referees: Martins, Martins (POR) |

| 27 September 2017; 18:15 | Norway | 35–22 | Ukraine | Stjørdalshallen, Stjørdal; Attendance: 2,878; Referees: Šniurevičius, Grigalionis (LIT) |
| 27 September 2017; 18:15 | Brattset, Røsberg Jacobsen 8 | (19–13) | Borshchenko 5 | Stjørdalshallen, Stjørdal; Attendance: 2,878; Referees: Šniurevičius, Grigalionis (LIT) |
| 27 September 2017; 18:15 | 2× (yellow card) 1× (suspension) | Report | 3× (yellow card) 2× (suspension) | Stjørdalshallen, Stjørdal; Attendance: 2,878; Referees: Šniurevičius, Grigalionis (LIT) |

| 1 October 2017; 17:00 | Switzerland | 12–29 | Norway | Stadhalle Kleinholz, Olten; Attendance: 1,675; Referees: Marić, Mašić (SER) |
| 1 October 2017; 17:00 | five players 2 | (5–12) | V. Kristiansen 5 | Stadhalle Kleinholz, Olten; Attendance: 1,675; Referees: Marić, Mašić (SER) |
| 1 October 2017; 17:00 | 3× (yellow card) 1× (suspension) | Report | 2× (yellow card) | Stadhalle Kleinholz, Olten; Attendance: 1,675; Referees: Marić, Mašić (SER) |

| 1 October 2017; 19:00 | Ukraine | 26–22 | Croatia | Sport Manezh of Sumy State University, Sumy; Attendance: 1,000; Referees: Florescu, Stoia (ROU) |
| 1 October 2017; 19:00 | Volovnyk 8 | (16–11) | Mičijević 7 | Sport Manezh of Sumy State University, Sumy; Attendance: 1,000; Referees: Florescu, Stoia (ROU) |
| 1 October 2017; 19:00 | 3× (yellow card) 2× (suspension) | Report | 3× (yellow card) 3× (suspension) | Sport Manezh of Sumy State University, Sumy; Attendance: 1,000; Referees: Florescu, Stoia (ROU) |

| 21 March 2018; 18:00 | Croatia | 25–32 | Norway | Dom Sportova, Zagreb; Attendance: 600; Referees: Alpaidze, Berezkina (RUS) |
| 21 March 2018; 18:00 | Peraica 8 | (10–18) | Kristiansen 9 | Dom Sportova, Zagreb; Attendance: 600; Referees: Alpaidze, Berezkina (RUS) |
| 21 March 2018; 18:00 | 2× (yellow card) 5× (suspension) | Report | 2× (yellow card) 2× (suspension) | Dom Sportova, Zagreb; Attendance: 600; Referees: Alpaidze, Berezkina (RUS) |

| 21 March 2018; 20:00 | Switzerland | 21–15 | Ukraine | GoEasy Arena, Würenlingen; Attendance: 1,175; Referees: Doychinov, Goretsov (BUL) |
| 21 March 2018; 20:00 | Weigelt 6 | (9–7) | Snopova 5 | GoEasy Arena, Würenlingen; Attendance: 1,175; Referees: Doychinov, Goretsov (BUL) |
| 21 March 2018; 20:00 | 2× (yellow card) 3× (suspension) | Report | 2× (yellow card) 5× (suspension) | GoEasy Arena, Würenlingen; Attendance: 1,175; Referees: Doychinov, Goretsov (BUL) |

| 25 March 2018; 18:15 | Norway | 33–27 | Croatia | Nadderud Arena, Bekkestua; Attendance: 1,921; Referees: Pech, Vágvölgyi (HUN) |
| 25 March 2018; 18:15 | Kurtović 7 | (13–12) | Posavec 5 | Nadderud Arena, Bekkestua; Attendance: 1,921; Referees: Pech, Vágvölgyi (HUN) |
| 25 March 2018; 18:15 | 3× (yellow card) 5× (suspension) | Report | 3× (yellow card) 9× (suspension) | Nadderud Arena, Bekkestua; Attendance: 1,921; Referees: Pech, Vágvölgyi (HUN) |

| 25 March 2018; 19:00 | Ukraine | 21–22 | Switzerland | Palace of Sports, Kyiv; Attendance: 1,950; Referees: Bennani, Bennani (SWE) |
| 25 March 2018; 19:00 | Borshchenko 10 | (9–9) | three players 5 | Palace of Sports, Kyiv; Attendance: 1,950; Referees: Bennani, Bennani (SWE) |
| 25 March 2018; 19:00 | 3× (yellow card) 1× (suspension) | Report | 3× (yellow card) 4× (suspension) | Palace of Sports, Kyiv; Attendance: 1,950; Referees: Bennani, Bennani (SWE) |

| 30 May 2018; 19:00 | Ukraine | 21–26 | Norway | Palace of Sports, Kyiv; Attendance: 1,500; Referees: Brkic, Jusufhodzic (AUT) |
| 30 May 2018; 19:00 | Glibko 7 | (8–10) | V. Kristiansen, Røsberg Jacobsen 5 | Palace of Sports, Kyiv; Attendance: 1,500; Referees: Brkic, Jusufhodzic (AUT) |
| 30 May 2018; 19:00 | 3× (yellow card) 3× (suspension) | Report | 2× (yellow card) 2× (suspension) | Palace of Sports, Kyiv; Attendance: 1,500; Referees: Brkic, Jusufhodzic (AUT) |

| 30 May 2018; 20:00 | Switzerland | 16–33 | Croatia | Sursee Stadthalle, Sursee; Attendance: 1,725; Referees: Vranes, Wenninger (AUT) |
| 30 May 2018; 20:00 | Weigelt 5 | (8–13) | Mičijević 7 | Sursee Stadthalle, Sursee; Attendance: 1,725; Referees: Vranes, Wenninger (AUT) |
| 30 May 2018; 20:00 | 2× (yellow card) 5× (suspension) | Report | 2× (yellow card) 6× (suspension) 1× (red card) | Sursee Stadthalle, Sursee; Attendance: 1,725; Referees: Vranes, Wenninger (AUT) |

| 2 June 2018; 18:00 | Croatia | 28–25 | Ukraine | Borovo Sports Hall, Vukovar; Attendance: 900; Referees: Ben-Dan, Faran (ISR) |
| 2 June 2018; 18:00 | Peraica 7 | (15–12) | Glibko 8 | Borovo Sports Hall, Vukovar; Attendance: 900; Referees: Ben-Dan, Faran (ISR) |
| 2 June 2018; 18:00 | 3× (yellow card) 6× (suspension) | Report | 3× (yellow card) 4× (suspension) | Borovo Sports Hall, Vukovar; Attendance: 900; Referees: Ben-Dan, Faran (ISR) |

| 2 June 2018; 19:15 | Norway | 41–18 | Switzerland | Boligmappa Arena Larvik, Larvik; Attendance: 2,325; Referees: Hatipoğlu, Şimşek (TUR) |
| 2 June 2018; 19:15 | Solberg 9 | (16–6) | Weigelt 4 | Boligmappa Arena Larvik, Larvik; Attendance: 2,325; Referees: Hatipoğlu, Şimşek (TUR) |
| 2 June 2018; 19:15 | 3× (yellow card) 1× (suspension) | Report | 3× (yellow card) 2× (suspension) | Boligmappa Arena Larvik, Larvik; Attendance: 2,325; Referees: Hatipoğlu, Şimşek (TUR) |

=== Group 2 ===
| Pos | Team | Pld | W | D | L | GF | GA | GD | Pts | Qualification |
|---|---|---|---|---|---|---|---|---|---|---|
| 1 | Montenegro | 6 | 6 | 0 | 0 | 161 | 128 | +33 | 12 | Final tournament |
| 2 | Poland | 6 | 4 | 0 | 2 | 171 | 138 | +33 | 8 | Final tournament |
| 3 | Slovakia | 6 | 2 | 0 | 4 | 129 | 143 | −14 | 4 | |
| 4 | Italy | 6 | 0 | 0 | 6 | 113 | 165 | −52 | 0 | |

Source: Eurohandball
Rules for classification: 1) points; 2) head-to-head points; 3) head-to-head goal difference; 4) head-to-head number of goals scored; 5) goal difference.

| 27 September 2017; 18:00 | Poland | 40–13 | Italy | Hala RCS, Lubin; Attendance: 1,900; Referees: Frieser, Kavulič (CZE) |
| 27 September 2017; 18:00 | Lisewska 7 | (16–8) | Rotondo 6 | Hala RCS, Lubin; Attendance: 1,900; Referees: Frieser, Kavulič (CZE) |
| 27 September 2017; 18:00 | 1× (yellow card) 1× (suspension) | Report | 3× (yellow card) 3× (suspension) | Hala RCS, Lubin; Attendance: 1,900; Referees: Frieser, Kavulič (CZE) |

| 28 September 2017; 17:00 | Montenegro | 24–23 | Slovakia | Topolica Sport Hall, Bar; Attendance: 2,100; Referees: Pandžić, Šatordžija (BIH) |
| 28 September 2017; 17:00 | Jauković 8 | (14–12) | Rajnohová 4 | Topolica Sport Hall, Bar; Attendance: 2,100; Referees: Pandžić, Šatordžija (BIH) |
| 28 September 2017; 17:00 | 3× (yellow card) 6× (suspension) | Report | 3× (yellow card) 5× (suspension) | Topolica Sport Hall, Bar; Attendance: 2,100; Referees: Pandžić, Šatordžija (BIH) |

| 1 October 2017; 16:00 | Slovakia | 20–29 | Poland | City Sport Hall Nitra, Nitra; Attendance: 1,000; Referees: Ilieva, Karbeska (MKD) |
| 1 October 2017; 16:00 | Jakubisová 5 | (9–13) | Kudłacz-Gloc 7 | City Sport Hall Nitra, Nitra; Attendance: 1,000; Referees: Ilieva, Karbeska (MKD) |
| 1 October 2017; 16:00 | 2× (yellow card) 3× (suspension) | Report | 2× (yellow card) 3× (suspension) | City Sport Hall Nitra, Nitra; Attendance: 1,000; Referees: Ilieva, Karbeska (MKD) |

| 1 October 2017; 16:30 | Italy | 16–23 | Montenegro | Palasport San Filippo, Brescia; Attendance: 2,000; Referees: Smailagic, Smailagic (SWE) |
| 1 October 2017; 16:30 | Landri 5 | (5–12) | Ujkić 6 | Palasport San Filippo, Brescia; Attendance: 2,000; Referees: Smailagic, Smailagic (SWE) |
| 1 October 2017; 16:30 | 3× (yellow card) 4× (suspension) | Report | 3× (yellow card) 5× (suspension) | Palasport San Filippo, Brescia; Attendance: 2,000; Referees: Smailagic, Smailagic (SWE) |

| 21 March 2018; 17:45 | Poland | 20–26 | Montenegro | Gdynia Sports Arena, Gdynia; Attendance: 2,050; Referees: Năstase, Stancu (ROU) |
| 21 March 2018; 17:45 | Kudłacz-Gloc, Lisewska 5 | (9–14) | Raičević 8 | Gdynia Sports Arena, Gdynia; Attendance: 2,050; Referees: Năstase, Stancu (ROU) |
| 21 March 2018; 17:45 | 3× (yellow card) | Report | 2× (yellow card) 4× (suspension) | Gdynia Sports Arena, Gdynia; Attendance: 2,050; Referees: Năstase, Stancu (ROU) |

| 21 March 2018; 18:15 | Italy | 20–21 | Slovakia | PalaGolfo, Follonica; Attendance: 1,500; Referees: Cabrejas, Sánchez (ESP) |
| 21 March 2018; 18:15 | Niederwieser 5 | (8–6) | Holešová, Szarková 6 | PalaGolfo, Follonica; Attendance: 1,500; Referees: Cabrejas, Sánchez (ESP) |
| 21 March 2018; 18:15 | 2× (yellow card) 3× (suspension) | Report | 3× (yellow card) 3× (suspension) | PalaGolfo, Follonica; Attendance: 1,500; Referees: Cabrejas, Sánchez (ESP) |

| 24 March 2018; 15:00 | Slovakia | 20–17 | Italy | Mestská športová hala Šaľa, Šaľa; Attendance: 1,200; Referees: Barysas, Petrušis (LTU) |
| 24 March 2018; 15:00 | Holešová 7 | (8–11) | four players 3 | Mestská športová hala Šaľa, Šaľa; Attendance: 1,200; Referees: Barysas, Petrušis (LTU) |
| 24 March 2018; 15:00 | 2× (yellow card) 5× (suspension) | Report | 2× (yellow card) 8× (suspension) | Mestská športová hala Šaľa, Šaľa; Attendance: 1,200; Referees: Barysas, Petrušis (LTU) |

| 24 March 2018; 18:00 | Montenegro | 33–23 | Poland | ADA Sport Centre, Pljevlja; Attendance: 4,000; Referees: Horváth, Marton (HUN) |
| 24 March 2018; 18:00 | Radičević 11 | (14–13) | Grzyb, Lisewska 6 | ADA Sport Centre, Pljevlja; Attendance: 4,000; Referees: Horváth, Marton (HUN) |
| 24 March 2018; 18:00 | 3× (yellow card) 5× (suspension) | Report | 1× (yellow card) 3× (suspension) | ADA Sport Centre, Pljevlja; Attendance: 4,000; Referees: Horváth, Marton (HUN) |

| 31 May 2018; 19:00 | Slovakia | 24–27 | Montenegro | Chemkostav Aréna, Michalovce; Attendance: 1,200; Referees: Martins, Martins (POR) |
| 31 May 2018; 19:00 | Szarková 6 | (10–11) | Raičević 8 | Chemkostav Aréna, Michalovce; Attendance: 1,200; Referees: Martins, Martins (POR) |
| 31 May 2018; 19:00 | 3× (yellow card) 3× (suspension) | Report | 3× (yellow card) 3× (suspension) | Chemkostav Aréna, Michalovce; Attendance: 1,200; Referees: Martins, Martins (POR) |

| 31 May 2018; 20:30 | Italy | 25–33 | Poland | Palazzetto dello Sport Corrado Roma, Pescara; Attendance: 1,200; Referees: Cindrić, Gonzurek (CRO) |
| 31 May 2018; 20:30 | Niederwieser 7 | (8–16) | Kudłacz-Gloc 9 | Palazzetto dello Sport Corrado Roma, Pescara; Attendance: 1,200; Referees: Cindrić, Gonzurek (CRO) |
| 31 May 2018; 20:30 | 3× (yellow card) 3× (suspension) | Report | 2× (yellow card) 3× (suspension) | Palazzetto dello Sport Corrado Roma, Pescara; Attendance: 1,200; Referees: Cindrić, Gonzurek (CRO) |

| 2 June 2018; 18:00 | Montenegro | 28–22 | Italy | Verde Complex Sala, Podgorica; Attendance: 1,350; Referees: Christidi, Papamattheou (GRE) |
| 2 June 2018; 18:00 | Ujkić 5 | (16–8) | Del Balzo, Landri 4 | Verde Complex Sala, Podgorica; Attendance: 1,350; Referees: Christidi, Papamattheou (GRE) |
| 2 June 2018; 18:00 | 1× (yellow card) 2× (suspension) | Report | 3× (yellow card) 2× (suspension) | Verde Complex Sala, Podgorica; Attendance: 1,350; Referees: Christidi, Papamattheou (GRE) |

| 3 June 2018; 18:30 | Poland | 26–21 | Slovakia | Hala Widowiskowo Sportowa, Koszalin; Attendance: 2,500; Referees: Gasmi, Gasmi (FRA) |
| 3 June 2018; 18:30 | Drabik 6 | (12–7) | Rajnohová 6 | Hala Widowiskowo Sportowa, Koszalin; Attendance: 2,500; Referees: Gasmi, Gasmi (FRA) |
| 3 June 2018; 18:30 | 3× (yellow card) 5× (suspension) | Report | 2× (yellow card) 5× (suspension) | Hala Widowiskowo Sportowa, Koszalin; Attendance: 2,500; Referees: Gasmi, Gasmi (FRA) |

=== Group 3 ===
| Pos | Team | Pld | W | D | L | GF | GA | GD | Pts | Qualification |
|---|---|---|---|---|---|---|---|---|---|---|
| 1 | Serbia | 6 | 5 | 0 | 1 | 197 | 148 | +49 | 10 (Note: Serbia 60–54 Sweden) | Final tournament |
| 2 | Sweden | 6 | 5 | 0 | 1 | 189 | 134 | +55 | 10 | Final tournament |
| 3 | Macedonia | 6 | 2 | 0 | 4 | 153 | 177 | −24 | 4 | |
| 4 | Faroe Islands | 6 | 0 | 0 | 6 | 104 | 184 | −80 | 0 | |

Source: Eurohandball
Rules for classification: 1) points; 2) head-to-head points; 3) head-to-head goal difference; 4) head-to-head number of goals scored; 5) goal difference.
Notes:

| 28 September 2017; 18:00 | Serbia | 36–20 | Faroe Islands | Sportska hala „Dragutin Tomašević“, Petrovac; Attendance: 1,600; Referees: Jović, Arnautović (BIH) |
| 28 September 2017; 18:00 | Krpež Slezak 7 | (16–9) | Armgarðardóttir 5 | Sportska hala „Dragutin Tomašević“, Petrovac; Attendance: 1,600; Referees: Jović, Arnautović (BIH) |
| 28 September 2017; 18:00 | 2× (yellow card) 2× (suspension) | Report | 3× (yellow card) 3× (suspension) | Sportska hala „Dragutin Tomašević“, Petrovac; Attendance: 1,600; Referees: Jović, Arnautović (BIH) |

| 28 September 2017; 18:30 | Sweden | 38–26 | Macedonia | Sparbanken Skåne Arena, Lund; Attendance: 2,300; Referees: Kijauskaitė, Žalienė (LIT) |
| 28 September 2017; 18:30 | Hagman 8 | (18–13) | Gjeorgjievska 9 | Sparbanken Skåne Arena, Lund; Attendance: 2,300; Referees: Kijauskaitė, Žalienė (LIT) |
| 28 September 2017; 18:30 | 2× (yellow card) 2× (suspension) | Report | 2× (yellow card) 3× (suspension) 1× (red card) | Sparbanken Skåne Arena, Lund; Attendance: 2,300; Referees: Kijauskaitė, Žalienė (LIT) |

| 1 October 2017; 17:00 | Faroe Islands | 15–33 | Sweden | Høllin á Hálsi, Tórshavn; Attendance: 411; Referees: Christidi, Papamattheou (GRE) |
| 1 October 2017; 17:00 | Armgarðardóttir 4 | (10–19) | Gulldén 6 | Høllin á Hálsi, Tórshavn; Attendance: 411; Referees: Christidi, Papamattheou (GRE) |
| 1 October 2017; 17:00 | 3× (yellow card) 2× (suspension) | Report | 2× (yellow card) 2× (suspension) | Høllin á Hálsi, Tórshavn; Attendance: 411; Referees: Christidi, Papamattheou (GRE) |

| 1 October 2017; 19:00 | Macedonia | 27–33 | Serbia | SRC Kale, Skopje; Attendance: 700; Referees: Lončar, Lončar (CRO) |
| 1 October 2017; 19:00 | Gakidova, Keramichieva 6 | (15–14) | Krpež Slezak 9 | SRC Kale, Skopje; Attendance: 700; Referees: Lončar, Lončar (CRO) |
| 1 October 2017; 19:00 | 2× (yellow card) 3× (suspension) | Report | 1× (yellow card) 2× (suspension) | SRC Kale, Skopje; Attendance: 700; Referees: Lončar, Lončar (CRO) |

| 21 March 2018; 18:00 | Serbia | 30–23 | Sweden | Čair Sports Center, Niš; Attendance: 2,500; Referees: Andorka, Hucker (HUN) |
| 21 March 2018; 18:00 | Krpež Slezak 8 | (9–15) | Hagman 5 | Čair Sports Center, Niš; Attendance: 2,500; Referees: Andorka, Hucker (HUN) |
| 21 March 2018; 18:00 | 3× (yellow card) 1× (suspension) | Report | 2× (yellow card) | Čair Sports Center, Niš; Attendance: 2,500; Referees: Andorka, Hucker (HUN) |

| 21 March 2018; 19:00 | Faroe Islands | 15–22 | Macedonia | Høllin á Hálsi, Tórshavn; Attendance: 415; Referees: Hájek, Macho (CZE) |
| 21 March 2018; 19:00 | Samuelsen 5 | (7–7) | Ristovska 8 | Høllin á Hálsi, Tórshavn; Attendance: 415; Referees: Hájek, Macho (CZE) |
| 21 March 2018; 19:00 | 2× (yellow card) 2× (suspension) | Report | 2× (yellow card) 2× (suspension) | Høllin á Hálsi, Tórshavn; Attendance: 415; Referees: Hájek, Macho (CZE) |

| 24 March 2018; 16:00 | Sweden | 31–30 | Serbia | Arena Skövde, Skövde; Attendance: 2,310; Referees: Baumgart, Wild (GER) |
| 24 March 2018; 16:00 | Hagman 8 | (16–13) | Krpež Slezak 11 | Arena Skövde, Skövde; Attendance: 2,310; Referees: Baumgart, Wild (GER) |
| 24 March 2018; 16:00 | 3× (yellow card) 2× (suspension) | Report | 3× (yellow card) 5× (suspension) | Arena Skövde, Skövde; Attendance: 2,310; Referees: Baumgart, Wild (GER) |

| 25 March 2018; 19:00 | Macedonia | 28–24 | Faroe Islands | SRC Kale, Skopje; Attendance: 700; Referees: Di Domenico, Fornasier (ITA) |
| 25 March 2018; 19:00 | Sazdovska 7 | (14–8) | three players 5 | SRC Kale, Skopje; Attendance: 700; Referees: Di Domenico, Fornasier (ITA) |
| 25 March 2018; 19:00 | 3× (yellow card) 3× (suspension) | Report | 3× (yellow card) 7× (suspension) | SRC Kale, Skopje; Attendance: 700; Referees: Di Domenico, Fornasier (ITA) |

| 30 May 2018; 19:00 | Macedonia | 20–32 | Sweden | SRC Kale, Skopje; Attendance: 600; Referees: Hofer, Schmidhuber (AUT) |
| 30 May 2018; 19:00 | Janeska, Ristovska 5 | (7–16) | Roberts 7 | SRC Kale, Skopje; Attendance: 600; Referees: Hofer, Schmidhuber (AUT) |
| 30 May 2018; 19:00 | 2× (yellow card) 4× (suspension) | Report | 2× (yellow card) 3× (suspension) | SRC Kale, Skopje; Attendance: 600; Referees: Hofer, Schmidhuber (AUT) |

| 30 May 2018; 19:00 | Faroe Islands | 17–33 | Serbia | Høllin á Hálsi, Tórshavn; Attendance: 250; Referees: Hermann, Madsen (DEN) |
| 30 May 2018; 19:00 | Hansen 4 | (11–17) | Krpež Slezak, Pop-Lazić 6 | Høllin á Hálsi, Tórshavn; Attendance: 250; Referees: Hermann, Madsen (DEN) |
| 30 May 2018; 19:00 | 3× (yellow card) 1× (suspension) | Report | 3× (yellow card) 2× (suspension) | Høllin á Hálsi, Tórshavn; Attendance: 250; Referees: Hermann, Madsen (DEN) |

| 2 June 2018; 16:00 | Sweden | 32–13 | Faroe Islands | Idrottshuset, Örebro; Attendance: 1,574; Referees: Sá, Sá (POR) |
| 2 June 2018; 16:00 | three players 4 | (17–4) | Eystberg 6 | Idrottshuset, Örebro; Attendance: 1,574; Referees: Sá, Sá (POR) |
| 2 June 2018; 16:00 | 2× (yellow card) 2× (suspension) | Report | 1× (yellow card) 6× (suspension) | Idrottshuset, Örebro; Attendance: 1,574; Referees: Sá, Sá (POR) |

| 3 June 2018; 18:00 | Serbia | 35–30 | Macedonia | Čair Sports Center, Niš; Attendance: 1,000; Referees: Doychinov, Goretsov (BUL) |
| 3 June 2018; 18:00 | Krpež Slezak, Obradović 6 | (16–13) | Gjeorgjievska 9 | Čair Sports Center, Niš; Attendance: 1,000; Referees: Doychinov, Goretsov (BUL) |
| 3 June 2018; 18:00 | 1× (yellow card) 2× (suspension) | Report | 1× (yellow card) 3× (suspension) | Čair Sports Center, Niš; Attendance: 1,000; Referees: Doychinov, Goretsov (BUL) |

=== Group 4 ===
| Pos | Team | Pld | W | D | L | GF | GA | GD | Pts | Qualification |
|---|---|---|---|---|---|---|---|---|---|---|
| 1 | Romania | 6 | 5 | 0 | 1 | 179 | 149 | +30 | 10 | Final tournament |
| 2 | Russia | 6 | 4 | 0 | 2 | 168 | 152 | +16 | 8 | Final tournament |
| 3 | Austria | 6 | 3 | 0 | 3 | 163 | 169 | −6 | 6 | |
| 4 | Portugal | 6 | 0 | 0 | 6 | 147 | 187 | −40 | 0 | |

Source: Eurohandball
Rules for classification: 1) points; 2) head-to-head points; 3) head-to-head goal difference; 4) head-to-head number of goals scored; 5) goal difference.

| 27 September 2017; 19:00 | Romania | 36–25 | Austria | Traian Sports Hall, Râmnicu Vâlcea; Attendance: 2,700; Referees: Álvarez, Bustamante (SPA) |
| 27 September 2017; 19:00 | four players 5 | (18–11) | Frey 8 | Traian Sports Hall, Râmnicu Vâlcea; Attendance: 2,700; Referees: Álvarez, Bustamante (SPA) |
| 27 September 2017; 19:00 | 2× (yellow card) 5× (suspension) | Report | 2× (yellow card) 3× (suspension) | Traian Sports Hall, Râmnicu Vâlcea; Attendance: 2,700; Referees: Álvarez, Bustamante (SPA) |

| 28 September 2017; 19:30 | Russia | 32–25 | Portugal | Krylatskoye Sports Palace, Moscow; Attendance: 2,000; Referees: Praštalo, Todorović (BIH) |
| 28 September 2017; 19:30 | Kochetova, Makeyeva 6 | (13–14) | Correia, Soares 5 | Krylatskoye Sports Palace, Moscow; Attendance: 2,000; Referees: Praštalo, Todorović (BIH) |
| 28 September 2017; 19:30 | 3× (yellow card) 2× (suspension) | Report | 3× (yellow card) 4× (suspension) | Krylatskoye Sports Palace, Moscow; Attendance: 2,000; Referees: Praštalo, Todorović (BIH) |

| 30 September 2017; 18:00 | Austria | 27–25 | Russia | BSFZ Südstadt, Maria Enzersdorf; Attendance: 950; Referees: Lidacka, Lesiak (POL) |
| 30 September 2017; 18:00 | Frey 7 | (13–16) | Kochetova 5 | BSFZ Südstadt, Maria Enzersdorf; Attendance: 950; Referees: Lidacka, Lesiak (POL) |
| 30 September 2017; 18:00 | 3× (yellow card) 5× (suspension) | Report | 2× (yellow card) 1× (red card) | BSFZ Südstadt, Maria Enzersdorf; Attendance: 950; Referees: Lidacka, Lesiak (POL) |

| 1 October 2017; 15:00 | Portugal | 16–32 | Romania | Pavilhão Gimnodesportivo Municipal de Luso, Luso; Attendance: 1,200; Referees: Antić, Jakovljević (SER) |
| 1 October 2017; 15:00 | Lopes, Soares 4 | (5–16) | Udriștioiu 7 | Pavilhão Gimnodesportivo Municipal de Luso, Luso; Attendance: 1,200; Referees: Antić, Jakovljević (SER) |
| 1 October 2017; 15:00 | 2× (yellow card) 4× (suspension) 1× (red card) | Report | 2× (yellow card) 3× (suspension) | Pavilhão Gimnodesportivo Municipal de Luso, Luso; Attendance: 1,200; Referees: Antić, Jakovljević (SER) |

| 21 March 2018; 19:30 | Russia | 30–25 | Romania | Lada Arena, Tolyatti; Attendance: 5,100; Referees: Chaskis, Tsakonas (GRE) |
| 21 March 2018; 19:30 | Dmitrieva 10 | (17–15) | Neagu 9 | Lada Arena, Tolyatti; Attendance: 5,100; Referees: Chaskis, Tsakonas (GRE) |
| 21 March 2018; 19:30 | 3× (yellow card) 5× (suspension) | Report | 3× (yellow card) 3× (suspension) | Lada Arena, Tolyatti; Attendance: 5,100; Referees: Chaskis, Tsakonas (GRE) |

| 22 March 2018; 20:30 | Portugal | 30–32 | Austria | Municipal Hall Tondela, Tondela; Attendance: 950; Referees: Mitrović, Vešović (MNE) |
| 22 March 2018; 20:30 | Rodrigues 10 | (11–17) | Scheffknecht 9 | Municipal Hall Tondela, Tondela; Attendance: 950; Referees: Mitrović, Vešović (MNE) |
| 22 March 2018; 20:30 | 2× (yellow card) 4× (suspension) | Report | 3× (yellow card) 5× (suspension) | Municipal Hall Tondela, Tondela; Attendance: 950; Referees: Mitrović, Vešović (MNE) |

| 24 March 2018; 20:25 | Austria | 29–24 | Portugal | Handball-Arena Rieden/Vorkloster, Bregenz; Attendance: 1,400; Referees: Mandák, Rudinský (SVK) |
| 24 March 2018; 20:25 | Scheffknecht 6 | (16–11) | Soares 7 | Handball-Arena Rieden/Vorkloster, Bregenz; Attendance: 1,400; Referees: Mandák, Rudinský (SVK) |
| 24 March 2018; 20:25 | 3× (yellow card) 8× (suspension) | Report | 3× (yellow card) 5× (suspension) | Handball-Arena Rieden/Vorkloster, Bregenz; Attendance: 1,400; Referees: Mandák, Rudinský (SVK) |

| 25 March 2018; 18:30 | Romania | 26–25 | Russia | BTarena, Cluj-Napoca; Attendance: 8,000; Referees: Christiansen, Hansen (DEN) |
| 25 March 2018; 18:30 | Buceschi 6 | (15–12) | Kuznetsova, Vedekhina 5 | BTarena, Cluj-Napoca; Attendance: 8,000; Referees: Christiansen, Hansen (DEN) |
| 25 March 2018; 18:30 | 1× (yellow card) 2× (suspension) | Report | 2× (yellow card) 2× (suspension) | BTarena, Cluj-Napoca; Attendance: 8,000; Referees: Christiansen, Hansen (DEN) |

| 31 May 2018; 17:00 | Portugal | 24–30 | Russia | Pavilhão Multiusos de Sines, Sines; Attendance: 1,000; Referees: Herczeg, Südi (HUN) |
| 31 May 2018; 17:00 | Ferreira, Soares 5 | (14–15) | Vyakhireva 11 | Pavilhão Multiusos de Sines, Sines; Attendance: 1,000; Referees: Herczeg, Südi (HUN) |
| 31 May 2018; 17:00 | 3× (yellow card) 2× (suspension) 1× (red card) | Report | 3× (yellow card) 2× (suspension) | Pavilhão Multiusos de Sines, Sines; Attendance: 1,000; Referees: Herczeg, Südi (HUN) |

| 31 May 2018; 20:25 | Austria | 25–28 | Romania | Olympiahalle, Innsbruck; Attendance: 1,500; Referees: Pech, Vágvölgyi (HUN) |
| 31 May 2018; 20:25 | Scheffknecht 9 | (11–13) | Buceschi 8 | Olympiahalle, Innsbruck; Attendance: 1,500; Referees: Pech, Vágvölgyi (HUN) |
| 31 May 2018; 20:25 | 2× (yellow card) 5× (suspension) | Report | 3× (yellow card) 4× (suspension) 1× (red card) | Olympiahalle, Innsbruck; Attendance: 1,500; Referees: Pech, Vágvölgyi (HUN) |

| 3 June 2018; 15:00 | Russia | 26–25 | Austria | Sportcomplex "Zvezdniy", Astrakhan; Attendance: 6,000; Referees: Marić, Mašić (SER) |
| 3 June 2018; 15:00 | Vyakhireva 12 | (16–13) | Kovács 10 | Sportcomplex "Zvezdniy", Astrakhan; Attendance: 6,000; Referees: Marić, Mašić (SER) |
| 3 June 2018; 15:00 | 3× (yellow card) 1× (suspension) | Report | 3× (yellow card) 5× (suspension) | Sportcomplex "Zvezdniy", Astrakhan; Attendance: 6,000; Referees: Marić, Mašić (SER) |

| 3 June 2018; 18:30 | Romania | 32–28 | Portugal | Sala Sporturilor Romeo Iamandi, Buzău; Attendance: 2,000; Referees: Duplii, Kaverina (UKR) |
| 3 June 2018; 18:30 | Buceschi 10 | (19–13) | Soares 6 | Sala Sporturilor Romeo Iamandi, Buzău; Attendance: 2,000; Referees: Duplii, Kaverina (UKR) |
| 3 June 2018; 18:30 | 2× (yellow card) 3× (suspension) | Report | 3× (yellow card) 3× (suspension) | Sala Sporturilor Romeo Iamandi, Buzău; Attendance: 2,000; Referees: Duplii, Kaverina (UKR) |

=== Group 5 ===
| Pos | Team | Pld | W | D | L | GF | GA | GD | Pts | Qualification |
|---|---|---|---|---|---|---|---|---|---|---|
| 1 | Denmark | 6 | 6 | 0 | 0 | 153 | 117 | +36 | 12 | Final tournament |
| 2 | Czech Republic | 6 | 2 | 2 | 2 | 155 | 152 | +3 | 6 | Final tournament |
| 3 | Slovenia | 6 | 1 | 3 | 2 | 161 | 159 | +2 | 5 | Final tournament |
| 4 | Iceland | 6 | 0 | 1 | 5 | 126 | 167 | −41 | 1 | |

Source: Eurohandball
Rules for classification: 1) points; 2) head-to-head points; 3) head-to-head goal difference; 4) head-to-head number of goals scored; 5) goal difference.

| 27 September 2017; 20:10 | Czech Republic | 30–23 | Iceland | Sportovní hala Euronics Zlín, Zlín; Attendance: 900; Referees: Năstase, Stancu (ROU) |
| 27 September 2017; 20:10 | Hrbková 10 | (15–11) | Haraldsdóttir 6 | Sportovní hala Euronics Zlín, Zlín; Attendance: 900; Referees: Năstase, Stancu (ROU) |
| 27 September 2017; 20:10 | 2× (yellow card) 2× (suspension) | Report | 2× (yellow card) 5× (suspension) | Sportovní hala Euronics Zlín, Zlín; Attendance: 900; Referees: Năstase, Stancu (ROU) |

| 27 September 2017; 21:00 | Denmark | 28–22 | Slovenia | Farum Arena, Farum; Attendance: 2,225; Referees: Herczeg, Südi (HUN) |
| 27 September 2017; 21:00 | Heindahl 8 | (12–11) | Stanko 6 | Farum Arena, Farum; Attendance: 2,225; Referees: Herczeg, Südi (HUN) |
| 27 September 2017; 21:00 | 2× (yellow card) 3× (suspension) | Report | 3× (yellow card) | Farum Arena, Farum; Attendance: 2,225; Referees: Herczeg, Südi (HUN) |

| 1 October 2017; 15:00 | Iceland | 14–29 | Denmark | Laugardalshöll, Reykjavík; Attendance: 653; Referees: Merz, Schilha (GER) |
| 1 October 2017; 15:00 | Pálsdóttir, Thompson 3 | (4–13) | Tranborg 8 | Laugardalshöll, Reykjavík; Attendance: 653; Referees: Merz, Schilha (GER) |
| 1 October 2017; 15:00 | 3× (yellow card) 2× (suspension) | Report | 3× (yellow card) 5× (suspension) | Laugardalshöll, Reykjavík; Attendance: 653; Referees: Merz, Schilha (GER) |

| 1 October 2017; 18:00 | Slovenia | 28–28 | Czech Republic | Zlatorog Arena, Celje; Attendance: 500; Referees: Chaskis, Tsakonas (GRE) |
| 1 October 2017; 18:00 | Stanko 11 | (15–14) | Luzumová 7 | Zlatorog Arena, Celje; Attendance: 500; Referees: Chaskis, Tsakonas (GRE) |
| 1 October 2017; 18:00 | 3× (yellow card) 5× (suspension) | Report | 3× (yellow card) 4× (suspension) | Zlatorog Arena, Celje; Attendance: 500; Referees: Chaskis, Tsakonas (GRE) |

| 21 March 2018; 17:00 | Czech Republic | 21–26 | Denmark | Sportovní hala města Plzně, Plzeň; Attendance: 850; Referees: Covalciuc, Covalciuc (MDA) |
| 21 March 2018; 17:00 | three players 5 | (14–15) | S. Jørgensen 6 | Sportovní hala města Plzně, Plzeň; Attendance: 850; Referees: Covalciuc, Covalciuc (MDA) |
| 21 March 2018; 17:00 | 2× (yellow card) 2× (suspension) | Report | 3× (yellow card) 6× (suspension) 1× (red card) | Sportovní hala města Plzně, Plzeň; Attendance: 850; Referees: Covalciuc, Covalciuc (MDA) |

| 21 March 2018; 19:30 | Iceland | 30–30 | Slovenia | Laugardalshöll, Reykjavík; Attendance: 750; Referees: Vranes, Wenninger (AUT) |
| 21 March 2018; 19:30 | Örvarsdottir 10 | (16–17) | Gros 7 | Laugardalshöll, Reykjavík; Attendance: 750; Referees: Vranes, Wenninger (AUT) |
| 21 March 2018; 19:30 | 2× (yellow card) 5× (suspension) | Report | 2× (yellow card) 3× (suspension) | Laugardalshöll, Reykjavík; Attendance: 750; Referees: Vranes, Wenninger (AUT) |

| 24 March 2018; 16:10 | Denmark | 21–20 | Czech Republic | Ceres Arena, Aarhus; Attendance: 3,872; Referees: Marić, Mašić (SER) |
| 24 March 2018; 16:10 | S. Jørgensen 4 | (13–9) | Luzumová 6 | Ceres Arena, Aarhus; Attendance: 3,872; Referees: Marić, Mašić (SER) |
| 24 March 2018; 16:10 | 3× (yellow card) 3× (suspension) | Report | 3× (yellow card) 2× (suspension) | Ceres Arena, Aarhus; Attendance: 3,872; Referees: Marić, Mašić (SER) |

| 25 March 2018; 17:00 | Slovenia | 28–18 | Iceland | Golovec Hall, Celje; Attendance: 1,200; Referees: Scevola, Alperan (ITA) |
| 25 March 2018; 17:00 | Gros 7 | (15–10) | Haraldsdóttir 4 | Golovec Hall, Celje; Attendance: 1,200; Referees: Scevola, Alperan (ITA) |
| 25 March 2018; 17:00 | 3× (yellow card) 5× (suspension) | Report | 3× (yellow card) 4× (suspension) | Golovec Hall, Celje; Attendance: 1,200; Referees: Scevola, Alperan (ITA) |

| 30 May 2018; 18:00 | Slovenia | 23–29 | Denmark | Golovec Hall, Celje; Attendance: 1,550; Referees: Mandák, Rudinský (SVK) |
| 30 May 2018; 18:00 | Gros 12 | (12–14) | Hansen, Woller 5 | Golovec Hall, Celje; Attendance: 1,550; Referees: Mandák, Rudinský (SVK) |
| 30 May 2018; 18:00 | 3× (yellow card) 3× (suspension) | Report | 2× (yellow card) 6× (suspension) | Golovec Hall, Celje; Attendance: 1,550; Referees: Mandák, Rudinský (SVK) |

| 30 May 2018; 19:30 | Iceland | 24–26 | Czech Republic | Laugardalshöll, Reykjavík; Attendance: 550; Referees: Brehmer, Skowronek (POL) |
| 30 May 2018; 19:30 | Knútsdóttir 7 | (9–14) | Luzumová 8 | Laugardalshöll, Reykjavík; Attendance: 550; Referees: Brehmer, Skowronek (POL) |
| 30 May 2018; 19:30 | 3× (yellow card) 3× (suspension) | Report | 2× (yellow card) 1× (suspension) | Laugardalshöll, Reykjavík; Attendance: 550; Referees: Brehmer, Skowronek (POL) |

| 2 June 2018; 16:10 | Denmark | 24–17 | Iceland | Forum Horsens Arena, Horsens; Attendance: 2,089; Referees: Bennani, Bennani (SWE) |
| 2 June 2018; 16:10 | three players 4 | (12–6) | Pálsdóttir 4 | Forum Horsens Arena, Horsens; Attendance: 2,089; Referees: Bennani, Bennani (SWE) |
| 2 June 2018; 16:10 | 3× (yellow card) 6× (suspension) | Report | 3× (yellow card) 1× (suspension) | Forum Horsens Arena, Horsens; Attendance: 2,089; Referees: Bennani, Bennani (SWE) |

| 3 June 2018; 19:00 | Czech Republic | 30–30 | Slovenia | Sportovni hala Banik Most, Most; Attendance: 1,100; Referees: Alpaidze, Berezkina (RUS) |
| 3 June 2018; 19:00 | Luzumová 9 | (17–12) | three players 6 | Sportovni hala Banik Most, Most; Attendance: 1,100; Referees: Alpaidze, Berezkina (RUS) |
| 3 June 2018; 19:00 | 2× (yellow card) 3× (suspension) | Report | 3× (yellow card) 4× (suspension) | Sportovni hala Banik Most, Most; Attendance: 1,100; Referees: Alpaidze, Berezkina (RUS) |

=== Group 6 ===
| Pos | Team | Pld | W | D | L | GF | GA | GD | Pts | Qualification |
|---|---|---|---|---|---|---|---|---|---|---|
| 1 | Spain | 6 | 5 | 0 | 1 | 161 | 123 | +38 | 10 | Final tournament |
| 2 | Germany | 6 | 4 | 1 | 1 | 177 | 121 | +56 | 9 | Final tournament |
| 3 | Turkey | 6 | 1 | 1 | 4 | 118 | 173 | −55 | 3 | |
| 4 | Lithuania | 6 | 0 | 2 | 4 | 117 | 156 | −39 | 2 | |

Source: Eurohandball
Rules for classification: 1) points; 2) head-to-head points; 3) head-to-head goal difference; 4) head-to-head number of goals scored; 5) goal difference.

| 27 September 2017; 20:00 | Spain | 35–16 | Turkey | Pabellón Polideportivo Javier Imbroda Ortiz, Melilla; Attendance: 1,800; Referees: Bounouara, Sami (FRA) |
| 27 September 2017; 20:00 | Martín 12 | (18–7) | Adıyaman 5 | Pabellón Polideportivo Javier Imbroda Ortiz, Melilla; Attendance: 1,800; Referees: Bounouara, Sami (FRA) |
| 27 September 2017; 20:00 | 3× (yellow card) 2× (suspension) | Report | 3× (yellow card) 3× (suspension) | Pabellón Polideportivo Javier Imbroda Ortiz, Melilla; Attendance: 1,800; Referees: Bounouara, Sami (FRA) |

| 27 September 2017; 20:00 | Germany | 26–26 | Lithuania | Große EWE Arena, Oldenburg; Attendance: 2,154; Referees: Sigurjónsson, Pétursson (ISL) |
| 27 September 2017; 20:00 | Bölk 6 | (11–14) | Gedroit 9 | Große EWE Arena, Oldenburg; Attendance: 2,154; Referees: Sigurjónsson, Pétursson (ISL) |
| 27 September 2017; 20:00 | 3× (yellow card) 5× (suspension) | Report | 3× (yellow card) 5× (suspension) | Große EWE Arena, Oldenburg; Attendance: 2,154; Referees: Sigurjónsson, Pétursson (ISL) |

| 1 October 2017; 17:00 | Turkey | 16–30 | Germany | Amasya Spor Salonu, Amasya; Attendance: 2,500; Referees: Vujačić, Kažanegra (MNE) |
| 1 October 2017; 17:00 | İskit 6 | (11–14) | Huber 6 | Amasya Spor Salonu, Amasya; Attendance: 2,500; Referees: Vujačić, Kažanegra (MNE) |
| 1 October 2017; 17:00 | 3× (yellow card) 6× (suspension) | Report | 3× (yellow card) 4× (suspension) | Amasya Spor Salonu, Amasya; Attendance: 2,500; Referees: Vujačić, Kažanegra (MNE) |

| 1 October 2017; 19:00 | Lithuania | 17–24 | Spain | Alytus Arena, Alytus; Attendance: 650; Referees: Alpaidze, Berezkina (RUS) |
| 1 October 2017; 19:00 | Ivanauskaitė 9 | (9–9) | Cabral 8 | Alytus Arena, Alytus; Attendance: 650; Referees: Alpaidze, Berezkina (RUS) |
| 1 October 2017; 19:00 | 3× (yellow card) 2× (suspension) | Report | 3× (yellow card) 2× (suspension) | Alytus Arena, Alytus; Attendance: 650; Referees: Alpaidze, Berezkina (RUS) |

| 21 March 2018; 19:00 | Germany | 33–24 | Spain | Scharrena Stuttgart, Stuttgart; Attendance: 1,735; Referees: Florescu, Stoia (ROU) |
| 21 March 2018; 19:00 | Smits 5 | (16–13) | Cabral 6 | Scharrena Stuttgart, Stuttgart; Attendance: 1,735; Referees: Florescu, Stoia (ROU) |
| 21 March 2018; 19:00 | 3× (yellow card) 4× (suspension) | Report | 3× (yellow card) 3× (suspension) | Scharrena Stuttgart, Stuttgart; Attendance: 1,735; Referees: Florescu, Stoia (ROU) |

| 22 March 2018; 19:00 | Lithuania | 22–22 | Turkey | Kaunas Sports Hall, Kaunas; Attendance: 1,450; Referees: Buache, Meyer (SUI) |
| 22 March 2018; 19:00 | Ivanauskaitė 6 | (9–12) | Özel 7 | Kaunas Sports Hall, Kaunas; Attendance: 1,450; Referees: Buache, Meyer (SUI) |
| 22 March 2018; 19:00 | 3× (yellow card) 3× (suspension) | Report | 2× (yellow card) 5× (suspension) | Kaunas Sports Hall, Kaunas; Attendance: 1,450; Referees: Buache, Meyer (SUI) |

| 24 March 2018; 20:00 | Spain | 27–23 | Germany | Polideportivo Municipal José Antonio Gasca, San Sebastián; Attendance: 2,448; Referees: Brehmer, Skowronek (POL) |
| 24 March 2018; 20:00 | Cabral 7 | (12–9) | Schulze 5 | Polideportivo Municipal José Antonio Gasca, San Sebastián; Attendance: 2,448; Referees: Brehmer, Skowronek (POL) |
| 24 March 2018; 20:00 | 3× (yellow card) 3× (suspension) | Report | 3× (yellow card) 3× (suspension) | Polideportivo Municipal José Antonio Gasca, San Sebastián; Attendance: 2,448; Referees: Brehmer, Skowronek (POL) |

| 25 March 2018; 17:30 | Turkey | 30–24 | Lithuania | Hasan Dağı Spor Salonu, Aksaray; Attendance: 2,400; Referees: Manea, Iliescu (ROU) |
| 25 March 2018; 17:30 | İskit 9 | (15–10) | Gedroit, Ivanauskaitė 8 | Hasan Dağı Spor Salonu, Aksaray; Attendance: 2,400; Referees: Manea, Iliescu (ROU) |
| 25 March 2018; 17:30 | 3× (yellow card) 8× (suspension) 1× (red card) | Report | 2× (yellow card) 3× (suspension) | Hasan Dağı Spor Salonu, Aksaray; Attendance: 2,400; Referees: Manea, Iliescu (ROU) |

| 30 May 2018; 17:00 | Turkey | 17–22 | Spain | Amasya Spor Salonu, Amasya; Attendance: 2,500; Referees: Ilieva, Karbeska (MKD) |
| 30 May 2018; 17:00 | İskit 8 | (9–9) | González 7 | Amasya Spor Salonu, Amasya; Attendance: 2,500; Referees: Ilieva, Karbeska (MKD) |
| 30 May 2018; 17:00 | 2× (yellow card) 2× (suspension) | Report | 3× (yellow card) 2× (suspension) | Amasya Spor Salonu, Amasya; Attendance: 2,500; Referees: Ilieva, Karbeska (MKD) |

| 31 May 2018; 19:00 | Lithuania | 11–25 | Germany | Alytus Arena, Alytus; Attendance: 350; Referees: Konjičanin, Konjičanin (BIH) |
| 31 May 2018; 19:00 | Šidlauskytė 3 | (6–10) | Loerper 5 | Alytus Arena, Alytus; Attendance: 350; Referees: Konjičanin, Konjičanin (BIH) |
| 31 May 2018; 19:00 | 2× (yellow card) 3× (suspension) | Report | 3× (yellow card) 6× (suspension) | Alytus Arena, Alytus; Attendance: 350; Referees: Konjičanin, Konjičanin (BIH) |

| 2 June 2018; 16:00 | Germany | 40–17 | Turkey | Schwalbe-Arena, Gummersbach; Attendance: 1,424; Referees: Lidacka, Lesiak (POL) |
| 2 June 2018; 16:00 | Stolle 6 | (20–10) | İskit 4 | Schwalbe-Arena, Gummersbach; Attendance: 1,424; Referees: Lidacka, Lesiak (POL) |
| 2 June 2018; 16:00 | 3× (yellow card) 2× (suspension) | Report | 3× (yellow card) 4× (suspension) | Schwalbe-Arena, Gummersbach; Attendance: 1,424; Referees: Lidacka, Lesiak (POL) |

| 2 June 2018; 18:00 | Spain | 29–17 | Lithuania | Quijote Arena, Ciudad Real; Attendance: 4,000; Referees: Antić, Jakovljević (SRB) |
| 2 June 2018; 18:00 | Etxeberria 5 | (15–7) | Kniubaitė 6 | Quijote Arena, Ciudad Real; Attendance: 4,000; Referees: Antić, Jakovljević (SRB) |
| 2 June 2018; 18:00 | 3× (yellow card) 3× (suspension) | Report | 3× (yellow card) 3× (suspension) | Quijote Arena, Ciudad Real; Attendance: 4,000; Referees: Antić, Jakovljević (SRB) |

=== Group 7 ===
| Pos | Team | Pld | W | D | L | GF | GA | GD | Pts | Qualification |
|---|---|---|---|---|---|---|---|---|---|---|
| 1 | Hungary | 6 | 5 | 0 | 1 | 170 | 108 | +62 | 10 (Note: Hungary 41–41 Netherlands. Hungary scored more away goals.) | Final tournament |
| 2 | Netherlands | 6 | 5 | 0 | 1 | 185 | 118 | +67 | 10 | Final tournament |
| 3 | Belarus | 6 | 2 | 0 | 4 | 161 | 157 | +4 | 4 | |
| 4 | Kosovo | 6 | 0 | 0 | 6 | 95 | 228 | −133 | 0 | |

Source: Eurohandball
Rules for classification: 1) points; 2) head-to-head points; 3) head-to-head goal difference; 4) head-to-head number of goals scored; 5) goal difference.
Notes:

| 27 September 2017; 18:00 | Hungary | 37–12 | Kosovo | Elek Gyula Aréna, Budapest; Attendance: 1,100; Referees: Backović, Palačković (SLO) |
| 27 September 2017; 18:00 | Bódi, Görbicz 6 | (18–5) | Aliu, Rexhepi 4 | Elek Gyula Aréna, Budapest; Attendance: 1,100; Referees: Backović, Palačković (SLO) |
| 27 September 2017; 18:00 | 2× (yellow card) 1× (suspension) | Report | 2× (yellow card) 2× (suspension) | Elek Gyula Aréna, Budapest; Attendance: 1,100; Referees: Backović, Palačković (SLO) |

| 27 September 2017; 19:30 | Netherlands | 33–21 | Belarus | Indoor-Sportcentrum Eindhoven, Eindhoven; Attendance: 4,500; Referees: Christiansen, Hansen (DEN) |
| 27 September 2017; 19:30 | Abbingh 6 | (16–10) | Nestsiaruk, Shamanouskaya 5 | Indoor-Sportcentrum Eindhoven, Eindhoven; Attendance: 4,500; Referees: Christiansen, Hansen (DEN) |
| 27 September 2017; 19:30 | 3× (yellow card) 2× (suspension) | Report | 2× (yellow card) 3× (suspension) | Indoor-Sportcentrum Eindhoven, Eindhoven; Attendance: 4,500; Referees: Christiansen, Hansen (DEN) |

| 1 October 2017; 14:30 | Belarus | 18–25 | Hungary | Minsk Sports Palace, Minsk; Attendance: 2,000; Referees: Opava, Válek (CZE) |
| 1 October 2017; 14:30 | Vasileuskaya 10 | (8–12) | Görbicz 6 | Minsk Sports Palace, Minsk; Attendance: 2,000; Referees: Opava, Válek (CZE) |
| 1 October 2017; 14:30 | 2× (yellow card) 1× (suspension) | Report | 3× (yellow card) 3× (suspension) | Minsk Sports Palace, Minsk; Attendance: 2,000; Referees: Opava, Válek (CZE) |

| 1 October 2017; 20:00 | Kosovo | 12–40 | Netherlands | Palace of Youth and Sports, Pristina; Attendance: 400; Referees: Sager, Styger (SUI) |
| 1 October 2017; 20:00 | Demaj 5 | (4–19) | Abbingh 8 | Palace of Youth and Sports, Pristina; Attendance: 400; Referees: Sager, Styger (SUI) |
| 1 October 2017; 20:00 | 2× (yellow card) 4× (suspension) | Report | 3× (yellow card) | Palace of Youth and Sports, Pristina; Attendance: 400; Referees: Sager, Styger (SUI) |

| 21 March 2018; 18:00 | Kosovo | 22–31 | Belarus | Palace of Youth and Sports, Pristina; Attendance: 1,000; Referees: Hatipoğlu, Şimşek (TUR) |
| 21 March 2018; 18:00 | Demaj 9 | (8–16) | three players 5 | Palace of Youth and Sports, Pristina; Attendance: 1,000; Referees: Hatipoğlu, Şimşek (TUR) |
| 21 March 2018; 18:00 | 3× (yellow card) 3× (suspension) | Report | 3× (yellow card) 3× (suspension) | Palace of Youth and Sports, Pristina; Attendance: 1,000; Referees: Hatipoğlu, Şimşek (TUR) |

| 22 March 2018; 18:00 | Hungary | 18–19 | Netherlands | Audi Aréna, Győr; Attendance: 5,000; Referees: Brkic, Jusufhodzic (AUT) |
| 22 March 2018; 18:00 | Hornyák 4 | (11–10) | Bont, Broch 6 | Audi Aréna, Győr; Attendance: 5,000; Referees: Brkic, Jusufhodzic (AUT) |
| 22 March 2018; 18:00 | 2× (yellow card) 2× (suspension) | Report | 3× (yellow card) 3× (suspension) | Audi Aréna, Győr; Attendance: 5,000; Referees: Brkic, Jusufhodzic (AUT) |

| 25 March 2018; 15:00 | Belarus | 41–18 | Kosovo | Minsk Sports Palace, Minsk; Attendance: 1,550; Referees: Jaškins, Žabko (LAT) |
| 25 March 2018; 15:00 | Kotsina 10 | (21–9) | Demaj 7 | Minsk Sports Palace, Minsk; Attendance: 1,550; Referees: Jaškins, Žabko (LAT) |
| 25 March 2018; 15:00 | 2× (yellow card) | Report | 2× (yellow card) 3× (suspension) | Minsk Sports Palace, Minsk; Attendance: 1,550; Referees: Jaškins, Žabko (LAT) |

| 25 March 2018; 16:00 | Netherlands | 22–23 | Hungary | Indoor-Sportcentrum Eindhoven, Eindhoven; Attendance: 6,000; Referees: Bonaventura, Bonaventura (FRA) |
| 25 March 2018; 16:00 | Abbingh 8 | (12–12) | Kovacsics 6 | Indoor-Sportcentrum Eindhoven, Eindhoven; Attendance: 6,000; Referees: Bonaventura, Bonaventura (FRA) |
| 25 March 2018; 16:00 | 3× (yellow card) 4× (suspension) | Report | 3× (yellow card) 5× (suspension) | Indoor-Sportcentrum Eindhoven, Eindhoven; Attendance: 6,000; Referees: Bonaventura, Bonaventura (FRA) |

| 30 May 2018; 18:00 | Kosovo | 15–37 | Hungary | Bill Clinton Arena, Ferizaj; Attendance: 500; Referees: Hájek, Macho (CZE) |
| 30 May 2018; 18:00 | Gjikokaj 5 | (3–16) | Hornyák, Schatzl 7 | Bill Clinton Arena, Ferizaj; Attendance: 500; Referees: Hájek, Macho (CZE) |
| 30 May 2018; 18:00 | 2× (yellow card) 2× (suspension) | Report | 2× (yellow card) 1× (suspension) | Bill Clinton Arena, Ferizaj; Attendance: 500; Referees: Hájek, Macho (CZE) |

| 31 May 2018; 19:00 | Belarus | 28–29 | Netherlands | Minsk Sports Palace, Minsk; Attendance: 2,300; Referees: Năstase, Stancu (ROU) |
| 31 May 2018; 19:00 | Mazgo 9 | (13–16) | Groot 10 | Minsk Sports Palace, Minsk; Attendance: 2,300; Referees: Năstase, Stancu (ROU) |
| 31 May 2018; 19:00 | 2× (yellow card) | Report | 1× (yellow card) 1× (suspension) | Minsk Sports Palace, Minsk; Attendance: 2,300; Referees: Năstase, Stancu (ROU) |

| 2 June 2018; 15:00 | Netherlands | 42–16 | Kosovo | Topsportcentrum, Almere; Attendance: 2,400; Referees: Kijauskaitė, Žalienė (LTU) |
| 2 June 2018; 15:00 | Nieuwenweg 8 | (21–10) | Merditaj 6 | Topsportcentrum, Almere; Attendance: 2,400; Referees: Kijauskaitė, Žalienė (LTU) |
| 2 June 2018; 15:00 | 3× (yellow card) 5× (suspension) | Report | 3× (yellow card) 2× (suspension) | Topsportcentrum, Almere; Attendance: 2,400; Referees: Kijauskaitė, Žalienė (LTU) |

| 2 June 2018; 16:30 | Hungary | 30–22 | Belarus | Messzi István Sportcsarnok, Kecskemét; Attendance: 1,866; Referees: Arntsen, Røen (NOR) |
| 2 June 2018; 16:30 | Hornyák 7 | (12–13) | Vasileuskaya 5 | Messzi István Sportcsarnok, Kecskemét; Attendance: 1,866; Referees: Arntsen, Røen (NOR) |
| 2 June 2018; 16:30 | 2× (yellow card) 2× (suspension) | Report | 2× (yellow card) 2× (suspension) | Messzi István Sportcsarnok, Kecskemét; Attendance: 1,866; Referees: Arntsen, Røen (NOR) |

=== Ranking of third-placed teams ===
To determine the best third-placed teams from the qualifying group stage which qualified directly for the final tournament, only the results against the first, and second-placed teams in their group were taken into account, while results against the fourth-placed team were not included. As a result, four matches played by each third-placed team counted for the purposes of determining the ranking.

| Pos | Grp | Team | Pld | W | D | L | GF | GA | GD | Pts | Qualification |
|---|---|---|---|---|---|---|---|---|---|---|---|
| 1 | 5 | Slovenia | 4 | 0 | 2 | 2 | 103 | 115 | −12 | 2 | Final tournament |
| 2 | 4 | Austria | 4 | 1 | 0 | 3 | 102 | 115 | −13 | 2 | |
| 3 | 2 | Slovakia | 4 | 0 | 0 | 4 | 88 | 106 | −18 | 0 | |
| 4 | 7 | Belarus | 4 | 0 | 0 | 4 | 89 | 108 | −19 | 0 | |
| 5 | 3 | Macedonia | 4 | 0 | 0 | 4 | 103 | 138 | −35 | 0 | |
| 6 | 1 | Switzerland | 4 | 0 | 0 | 4 | 74 | 135 | −61 | 0 | |
| 7 | 6 | Turkey | 4 | 0 | 0 | 4 | 66 | 127 | −61 | 0 | |

Source: Eurohandball
Rules for classification: 1) points; 2) goal difference; 3) goals scored.
