= 2019 World Women's Handball Championship – European qualification =

The European qualification for the 2019 World Women's Handball Championship, in Japan, was played over two rounds.

In the first round of qualification, 16 teams who were not participating at the 2018 European Championship were split into four groups. Each winner from the four groups and the best 2nd-placed team joined the remaining 12 teams from the European Championship and Austria as the second-best third-ranked team from the 2018 European Championship qualification and played play-offs to determine the nine qualifiers.

== Qualification phase 1 ==
=== Seeding ===
The draw was held on 24 June 2016. The winner from each group and the best second-ranked team advanced to the play-off round. Each group played their matches in a mini-tournament at a pre-selected location.

Pot 1	Pot 2	Pot 3
Belarus; Macedonia; Switzerland; Slovakia; Turkey	Faroe Islands; Iceland; Italy; Kosovo; Lithuania; Portugal; Ukraine	Azerbaijan; Finland; Greece; Israel

All times are local.

=== Group 1 ===
Pos	Team	Pld	W	D	L	GF	GA	GD	Pts	Qualification
1	Slovakia (H)	3	3	0	0	100	67	+33	6	Qualification phase 2
2	Ukraine	3	2	0	1	111	80	+31	4	
3	Israel	3	1	0	2	73	84	−11	2	
4	Kosovo	3	0	0	3	59	112	−53	0	

Source: Eurohandball
Rules for classification: 1) points; 2) head-to-head points; 3) head-to-head goal difference; 4) head-to-head number of goals scored; 5) goal difference.
(H) Hosts

30 November 2018; 15:30	Kosovo	25–28	Israel	Mestská športová hala, Šaľa; Attendance: 150; Referees: Merisi, Rosca (ITA)
30 November 2018; 15:30	Demaj 9	(11–16)	Vakrat 12	Mestská športová hala, Šaľa; Attendance: 150; Referees: Merisi, Rosca (ITA)
30 November 2018; 15:30	3× (yellow card) 4× (suspension)	Report	3× (yellow card) 5× (suspension)	Mestská športová hala, Šaľa; Attendance: 150; Referees: Merisi, Rosca (ITA)

30 November 2018; 18:00	Slovakia	36–32	Ukraine	Mestská športová hala, Šaľa; Attendance: 1,900; Referees: Sá, Sá (POR)
30 November 2018; 18:00	Rajnohová 12	(17–13)	Borshchenko, Glibko 7	Mestská športová hala, Šaľa; Attendance: 1,900; Referees: Sá, Sá (POR)
30 November 2018; 18:00	3× (yellow card) 3× (suspension)	Report	2× (yellow card) 4× (suspension)	Mestská športová hala, Šaľa; Attendance: 1,900; Referees: Sá, Sá (POR)

1 December 2018; 15:30	Ukraine	44–19	Kosovo	Mestská športová hala, Šaľa; Attendance: 150; Referees: Merisi, Rosca (ITA)
1 December 2018; 15:30	Glibko 9	(23–7)	Merditaj 8	Mestská športová hala, Šaľa; Attendance: 150; Referees: Merisi, Rosca (ITA)
1 December 2018; 15:30	2× (yellow card) 3× (suspension)	Report	2× (yellow card) 4× (suspension)	Mestská športová hala, Šaľa; Attendance: 150; Referees: Merisi, Rosca (ITA)

1 December 2018; 18:00	Israel	20–24	Slovakia	Mestská športová hala, Šaľa; Attendance: 1,500; Referees: Sá, Sá (POR)
1 December 2018; 18:00	Bertaut, Vakrat 5	(7–11)	Patrnčiaková 6	Mestská športová hala, Šaľa; Attendance: 1,500; Referees: Sá, Sá (POR)
1 December 2018; 18:00	1× (yellow card) 3× (suspension)	Report	3× (yellow card) 1× (suspension)	Mestská športová hala, Šaľa; Attendance: 1,500; Referees: Sá, Sá (POR)

2 December 2018; 15:30	Ukraine	35–25	Israel	Mestská športová hala, Šaľa; Attendance: 100; Referees: Merisi, Rosca (ITA)
2 December 2018; 15:30	Glibko 10	(23–11)	Aminov 8	Mestská športová hala, Šaľa; Attendance: 100; Referees: Merisi, Rosca (ITA)
2 December 2018; 15:30	2× (yellow card) 3× (suspension)	Report	2× (yellow card) 1× (suspension)	Mestská športová hala, Šaľa; Attendance: 100; Referees: Merisi, Rosca (ITA)

2 December 2018; 18:00	Slovakia	40–15	Kosovo	Mestská športová hala, Šaľa; Attendance: 1,000; Referees: Sá, Sá (POR)
2 December 2018; 18:00	Patrnčiaková 6	(18–5)	Kameri 7	Mestská športová hala, Šaľa; Attendance: 1,000; Referees: Sá, Sá (POR)
2 December 2018; 18:00	2× (yellow card) 3× (suspension)	Report	1× (yellow card) 2× (suspension)	Mestská športová hala, Šaľa; Attendance: 1,000; Referees: Sá, Sá (POR)

=== Group 2 ===
Pos	Team	Pld	W	D	L	GF	GA	GD	Pts	Qualification
1	Switzerland (H)	3	3	0	0	65	49	+16	6	Qualification phase 2
2	Lithuania	3	1	0	2	75	71	+4	2 (Note: Lithuania 2 Pts, +5 GD; Faore Islands 2 Pts, +1 GD; Finland 2 Pts, −6 GD)	
3	Faroe Islands	3	1	0	2	63	66	−3	2	
4	Finland	3	1	0	2	57	74	−17	2	

Source: Eurohandball
Rules for classification: 1) points; 2) head-to-head points; 3) head-to-head goal difference; 4) head-to-head number of goals scored; 5) goal difference.
(H) Hosts
Notes:

30 November 2018; 16:30	Faroe Islands	19–22	Finland	GoEasy Arena, Untersiggenthal; Attendance: 180; Referees: Christidi, Papamattheou (GRE)
30 November 2018; 16:30	Christophersen Jojic 6	(12–10)	Aarnio 8	GoEasy Arena, Untersiggenthal; Attendance: 180; Referees: Christidi, Papamattheou (GRE)
30 November 2018; 16:30	2× (yellow card) 3× (suspension)	Report	3× (yellow card) 2× (suspension)	GoEasy Arena, Untersiggenthal; Attendance: 180; Referees: Christidi, Papamattheou (GRE)

30 November 2018; 19:00	Switzerland	21–20	Lithuania	GoEasy Arena, Untersiggenthal; Attendance: 1,050; Referees: Lidacka, Lesiak (POL)
30 November 2018; 19:00	Gautschi 5	(13–12)	Gedroit 6	GoEasy Arena, Untersiggenthal; Attendance: 1,050; Referees: Lidacka, Lesiak (POL)
30 November 2018; 19:00	3× (yellow card) 3× (suspension)	Report	2× (yellow card) 4× (suspension)	GoEasy Arena, Untersiggenthal; Attendance: 1,050; Referees: Lidacka, Lesiak (POL)

1 December 2018; 16:30	Lithuania	21–25	Faroe Islands	GoEasy Arena, Untersiggenthal; Attendance: 250; Referees: Lidacka, Lesiak (POL)
1 December 2018; 16:30	Gedroit 5	(11–15)	Christophersen Jojic 6	GoEasy Arena, Untersiggenthal; Attendance: 250; Referees: Lidacka, Lesiak (POL)
1 December 2018; 16:30	3× (yellow card) 2× (suspension)	Report	3× (yellow card) 2× (suspension)	GoEasy Arena, Untersiggenthal; Attendance: 250; Referees: Lidacka, Lesiak (POL)

1 December 2018; 19:00	Finland	10–21	Switzerland	GoEasy Arena, Untersiggenthal; Attendance: 975; Referees: Christidi, Papamattheou (GRE)
1 December 2018; 19:00	Kulju 4	(7–10)	Frey 5	GoEasy Arena, Untersiggenthal; Attendance: 975; Referees: Christidi, Papamattheou (GRE)
1 December 2018; 19:00	3× (yellow card) 3× (suspension)	Report	3× (yellow card) 1× (suspension)	GoEasy Arena, Untersiggenthal; Attendance: 975; Referees: Christidi, Papamattheou (GRE)

2 December 2018; 12:00	Lithuania	34–25	Finland	GoEasy Arena, Untersiggenthal; Attendance: 105; Referees: Lidacka, Lesiak (POL)
2 December 2018; 12:00	Kavaliauskaitė 11	(17–9)	Hilli, Voutilainen 4	GoEasy Arena, Untersiggenthal; Attendance: 105; Referees: Lidacka, Lesiak (POL)
2 December 2018; 12:00	3× (yellow card) 3× (suspension)	Report	2× (yellow card) 4× (suspension)	GoEasy Arena, Untersiggenthal; Attendance: 105; Referees: Lidacka, Lesiak (POL)

2 December 2018; 15:00	Switzerland	23–19	Faroe Islands	GoEasy Arena, Untersiggenthal; Attendance: 950; Referees: Christidi, Papamattheou (GRE)
2 December 2018; 15:00	Gautschi 7	(11–8)	Henneberg Joensen 4	GoEasy Arena, Untersiggenthal; Attendance: 950; Referees: Christidi, Papamattheou (GRE)
2 December 2018; 15:00	3× (yellow card) 2× (suspension)	Report	2× (yellow card) 3× (suspension)	GoEasy Arena, Untersiggenthal; Attendance: 950; Referees: Christidi, Papamattheou (GRE)

=== Group 3 ===
Pos	Team	Pld	W	D	L	GF	GA	GD	Pts	Qualification
1	Belarus	3	3	0	0	94	67	+27	6	Qualification phase 2
2	Greece (H)	3	2	0	1	57	62	−5	4	
3	Portugal	3	1	0	2	72	67	+5	2	
4	Italy	3	0	0	3	65	92	−27	0	

Source: Eurohandball
Rules for classification: 1) points; 2) head-to-head points; 3) head-to-head goal difference; 4) head-to-head number of goals scored; 5) goal difference.
(H) Hosts

23 November 2018; 17:00	Belarus	31–23	Portugal	DAK Amyntaio, Amyntaio; Attendance: 300; Referees: Merz, Schilha (GER)
23 November 2018; 17:00	Kotsina 9	(15–14)	three players 5	DAK Amyntaio, Amyntaio; Attendance: 300; Referees: Merz, Schilha (GER)
23 November 2018; 17:00	2× (yellow card) 4× (suspension)	Report	2× (yellow card) 3× (suspension)	DAK Amyntaio, Amyntaio; Attendance: 300; Referees: Merz, Schilha (GER)

23 November 2018; 19:30	Italy	19–23	Greece	DAK Amyntaio, Amyntaio; Attendance: 800; Referees: Pech, Vágvölgyi (HUN)
23 November 2018; 19:30	Del Balzo, Eder 4	(9–12)	Tsàkalou 9	DAK Amyntaio, Amyntaio; Attendance: 800; Referees: Pech, Vágvölgyi (HUN)
23 November 2018; 19:30	3× (yellow card) 6× (suspension)	Report	3× (yellow card) 3× (suspension)	DAK Amyntaio, Amyntaio; Attendance: 800; Referees: Pech, Vágvölgyi (HUN)

24 November 2018; 17:00	Greece	18–28	Belarus	DAK Amyntaio, Amyntaio; Attendance: 900; Referees: Merz, Schilha (GER)
24 November 2018; 17:00	Vafeiadou 6	(8–14)	Shamanouskaya, Vasileuskaya 5	DAK Amyntaio, Amyntaio; Attendance: 900; Referees: Merz, Schilha (GER)
24 November 2018; 17:00	1× (yellow card) 1× (suspension)	Report	2× (yellow card) 2× (suspension)	DAK Amyntaio, Amyntaio; Attendance: 900; Referees: Merz, Schilha (GER)

24 November 2018; 19:30	Portugal	34–20	Italy	DAK Amyntaio, Amyntaio; Attendance: 300; Referees: Pech, Vágvölgyi (HUN)
24 November 2018; 19:30	Vieira 6	(19–9)	Del Balzo 6	DAK Amyntaio, Amyntaio; Attendance: 300; Referees: Pech, Vágvölgyi (HUN)
24 November 2018; 19:30	2× (yellow card) 4× (suspension)	Report	3× (yellow card) 6× (suspension)	DAK Amyntaio, Amyntaio; Attendance: 300; Referees: Pech, Vágvölgyi (HUN)

25 November 2018; 17:00	Portugal	15–16	Greece	DAK Amyntaio, Amyntaio; Attendance: 1,200; Referees: Merz, Schilha (GER)
25 November 2018; 17:00	Emidio, Vieira 4	(4–5)	Vafeiadou 8	DAK Amyntaio, Amyntaio; Attendance: 1,200; Referees: Merz, Schilha (GER)
25 November 2018; 17:00	2× (yellow card) 2× (suspension)	Report	3× (yellow card) 4× (suspension)	DAK Amyntaio, Amyntaio; Attendance: 1,200; Referees: Merz, Schilha (GER)

25 November 2018; 19:30	Belarus	35–26	Italy	DAK Amyntaio, Amyntaio; Attendance: 300; Referees: Pech, Vágvölgyi (HUN)
25 November 2018; 19:30	Yezhykava 7	(17–15)	Manojlovic 7	DAK Amyntaio, Amyntaio; Attendance: 300; Referees: Pech, Vágvölgyi (HUN)
25 November 2018; 19:30	3× (yellow card) 1× (suspension)	Report	2× (yellow card) 5× (suspension)	DAK Amyntaio, Amyntaio; Attendance: 300; Referees: Pech, Vágvölgyi (HUN)

=== Group 4 ===
Pos	Team	Pld	W	D	L	GF	GA	GD	Pts	Qualification
1	Macedonia (H)	3	3	0	0	100	66	+34	6	Qualification phase 2
2	Iceland	3	2	0	1	106	70	+36	4	Qualification phase 2
3	Turkey	3	1	0	2	78	92	−14	2	
4	Azerbaijan	3	0	0	3	66	122	−56	0	

Source: Eurohandball
Rules for classification: 1) points; 2) head-to-head points; 3) head-to-head goal difference; 4) head-to-head number of goals scored; 5) goal difference.
(H) Hosts

30 November 2018; 18:00	Macedonia	41–22	Azerbaijan	Boris Trajkovski Sports Center, Skopje; Attendance: 600; Referees: Duplii, Pobedrina (UKR)
30 November 2018; 18:00	Ristovska 11	(18–8)	Tankaskaya 6	Boris Trajkovski Sports Center, Skopje; Attendance: 600; Referees: Duplii, Pobedrina (UKR)
30 November 2018; 18:00	2× (yellow card) 3× (suspension)	Report	2× (yellow card) 1× (suspension)	Boris Trajkovski Sports Center, Skopje; Attendance: 600; Referees: Duplii, Pobedrina (UKR)

30 November 2018; 20:00	Turkey	23–36	Iceland	Boris Trajkovski Sports Center, Skopje; Attendance: 100; Referees: Praštalo, Balvan (BIH)
30 November 2018; 20:00	Şahin 5	(14–18)	Pálsdóttir 8	Boris Trajkovski Sports Center, Skopje; Attendance: 100; Referees: Praštalo, Balvan (BIH)
30 November 2018; 20:00	3× (yellow card) 2× (suspension)	Report	3× (yellow card) 2× (suspension)	Boris Trajkovski Sports Center, Skopje; Attendance: 100; Referees: Praštalo, Balvan (BIH)

1 December 2018; 18:00	Iceland	21–29	Macedonia	Boris Trajkovski Sports Center, Skopje; Attendance: 600; Referees: Praštalo, Balvan (BIH)
1 December 2018; 18:00	Pálsdóttir, Stefánsdóttir 5	(10–16)	Ristovska 9	Boris Trajkovski Sports Center, Skopje; Attendance: 600; Referees: Praštalo, Balvan (BIH)
1 December 2018; 18:00	1× (yellow card) 2× (suspension)	Report	3× (yellow card) 3× (suspension)	Boris Trajkovski Sports Center, Skopje; Attendance: 600; Referees: Praštalo, Balvan (BIH)

1 December 2018; 20:00	Azerbaijan	26–32	Turkey	Boris Trajkovski Sports Center, Skopje; Attendance: 100; Referees: Duplii, Pobedrina (UKR)
1 December 2018; 20:00	Gasimova, Tankaskaya 6	(13–17)	Bozdoğan 5	Boris Trajkovski Sports Center, Skopje; Attendance: 100; Referees: Duplii, Pobedrina (UKR)
1 December 2018; 20:00	1× (yellow card) 3× (suspension)	Report	3× (yellow card) 9× (suspension)	Boris Trajkovski Sports Center, Skopje; Attendance: 100; Referees: Duplii, Pobedrina (UKR)

2 December 2018; 18:00	Iceland	49–18	Azerbaijan	Boris Trajkovski Sports Center, Skopje; Attendance: 100; Referees: Duplii, Pobedrina (UKR)
2 December 2018; 18:00	Stefánsdóttir 13	(28–9)	three players 4	Boris Trajkovski Sports Center, Skopje; Attendance: 100; Referees: Duplii, Pobedrina (UKR)
2 December 2018; 18:00	3× (yellow card) 4× (suspension)	Report	2× (yellow card) 6× (suspension)	Boris Trajkovski Sports Center, Skopje; Attendance: 100; Referees: Duplii, Pobedrina (UKR)

2 December 2018; 20:00	Turkey	23–30	Macedonia	Boris Trajkovski Sports Center, Skopje; Attendance: 700; Referees: Praštalo, Balvan (BIH)
2 December 2018; 20:00	Bozdoğan, Türkoğlu 5	(10–16)	Ristovska 9	Boris Trajkovski Sports Center, Skopje; Attendance: 700; Referees: Praštalo, Balvan (BIH)
2 December 2018; 20:00	3× (yellow card) 4× (suspension) 1× (red card)	Report	2× (yellow card) 2× (suspension)	Boris Trajkovski Sports Center, Skopje; Attendance: 700; Referees: Praštalo, Balvan (BIH)

=== Ranking of second-placed teams ===
Pos	Grp	Team	Pld	W	D	L	GF	GA	GD	Pts	Qualification
1	4	Iceland	3	2	0	1	106	70	+36	4	Qualification phase 2
2	1	Ukraine	3	2	0	1	111	80	+31	4	
3	3	Greece	3	2	0	1	57	62	−5	4	
4	2	Lithuania	3	1	0	2	75	71	+4	2	

Updated to match(es) played on 2 December 2018. Source: Eurohandball
Rules for classification: 1) points; 2) goal difference; 3) goals scored.

== Qualification phase 2 ==
The draw was held on 15 December 2018 at Paris. The teams played a home-and away series to determine the participants for the final tournament.

=== Seedings ===
Pot 1 (9 best ranked teams from the 2018 European Championship not already qualified for World Championship)	Pot 2 (3 lowest ranked teams from the 2018 European Championship + Austria + teams from the qualification round)
Denmark; Germany; Hungary; Montenegro; Norway; Serbia; Slovenia; Spain; Sweden	Austria; Belarus; Croatia; Czech Republic; Iceland; North Macedonia; Poland; Slovakia; Switzerland

=== Overview ===
Team 1	Agg.	Team 2	1st leg	2nd leg
Croatia	45–49	Germany	24–24	21–25
Denmark	61–36	Switzerland	35–22	26–14
Sweden	78–42	Slovakia	33–18	45–24
Belarus	49–65	Norway	21–34	28–31
Serbia	60–49	Poland	33–19	27–30
Czech Republic	49–49 (a)	Montenegro	26–24	23–25
North Macedonia	57–71	Slovenia	30–33	27–38
Austria	42–69	Hungary	23–41	19–28
Spain	66–58	Iceland	35–26	31–32

All times are local.

=== Matches ===
2 June 2019; 16:00	Croatia	24–24	Germany	Sports Hall Fran Galović, Koprivnica; Attendance: 1,500; Referees: Horváth, Marton (HUN)
2 June 2019; 16:00	Blažević, Turk 5	(11–10)	Naidzinavicius 6	Sports Hall Fran Galović, Koprivnica; Attendance: 1,500; Referees: Horváth, Marton (HUN)
2 June 2019; 16:00	3× (yellow card) 4× (suspension)	Report	2× (yellow card) 5× (suspension)	Sports Hall Fran Galović, Koprivnica; Attendance: 1,500; Referees: Horváth, Marton (HUN)

5 June 2019; 18:45	Germany	25–21	Croatia	Westpress Arena, Hamm; Attendance: 2,167; Referees: Canbro, Kliko (SWE)
5 June 2019; 18:45	Stolle 6	(14–9)	Blažević 7	Westpress Arena, Hamm; Attendance: 2,167; Referees: Canbro, Kliko (SWE)
5 June 2019; 18:45	3× (yellow card) 2× (suspension)	Report	2× (yellow card) 4× (suspension)	Westpress Arena, Hamm; Attendance: 2,167; Referees: Canbro, Kliko (SWE)

Germany won 49–45 on aggregate.

1 June 2019; 16:10	Denmark	35–22	Switzerland	Roskilde Hallen, Roskilde; Attendance: 2,088; Referees: Covalciuc, Covalciuc (MDA)
1 June 2019; 16:10	Hansen 8	(18–10)	Gautschi 7	Roskilde Hallen, Roskilde; Attendance: 2,088; Referees: Covalciuc, Covalciuc (MDA)
1 June 2019; 16:10	1× (yellow card) 4× (suspension)	Report	2× (yellow card) 5× (suspension)	Roskilde Hallen, Roskilde; Attendance: 2,088; Referees: Covalciuc, Covalciuc (MDA)

5 June 2019; 18:15	Switzerland	14–26	Denmark	Axa-Arena, Winterthur; Attendance: 1,165; Referees: Panayides, Andreou (CYP)
5 June 2019; 18:15	Kündig 5	(5–12)	K. Jørgensen 6	Axa-Arena, Winterthur; Attendance: 1,165; Referees: Panayides, Andreou (CYP)
5 June 2019; 18:15	3× (yellow card)	Report	2× (yellow card) 2× (suspension)	Axa-Arena, Winterthur; Attendance: 1,165; Referees: Panayides, Andreou (CYP)

Denmark won 61–36 on aggregate.

1 June 2019; 17:00	Sweden	33–18	Slovakia	Brinova Arena Karlskrona, Karlskrona; Attendance: 2,800; Referees: Pandzic, Mosorinski (SRB)
1 June 2019; 17:00	Hagman 7	(18–10)	Bíziková 7	Brinova Arena Karlskrona, Karlskrona; Attendance: 2,800; Referees: Pandzic, Mosorinski (SRB)
1 June 2019; 17:00	2× (yellow card) 3× (suspension)	Report	2× (yellow card) 2× (suspension)	Brinova Arena Karlskrona, Karlskrona; Attendance: 2,800; Referees: Pandzic, Mosorinski (SRB)

6 June 2019; 18:00	Slovakia	24–45	Sweden	Mestská športová hala Šaľa, Šaľa; Attendance: 800; Referees: Herczeg, Südi (HUN)
6 June 2019; 18:00	Bíziková 9	(10–25)	Mässing 9	Mestská športová hala Šaľa, Šaľa; Attendance: 800; Referees: Herczeg, Südi (HUN)
6 June 2019; 18:00	2× (yellow card) 4× (suspension) 2× (red card)	Report	2× (yellow card) 4× (suspension)	Mestská športová hala Šaľa, Šaľa; Attendance: 800; Referees: Herczeg, Südi (HUN)

Sweden won 78–42 on aggregate.

31 May 2019; 19:15	Belarus	21–34	Norway	Universal Sports Complex Victoria, Brest; Attendance: 1,560; Referees: Prastalo, Balvan (BIH)
31 May 2019; 19:15	Shamanouskaya 6	(10–17)	Løke 6	Universal Sports Complex Victoria, Brest; Attendance: 1,560; Referees: Prastalo, Balvan (BIH)
31 May 2019; 19:15	2× (yellow card) 3× (suspension)	Report	2× (yellow card)	Universal Sports Complex Victoria, Brest; Attendance: 1,560; Referees: Prastalo, Balvan (BIH)

5 June 2019; 19:00	Norway	31–28	Belarus	Sotra Arena, Bergen; Attendance: 3,809; Referees: Bolic, Hurich (AUT)
5 June 2019; 19:00	Brattset 7	(21–11)	Ilyina, Shamanouskaya 6	Sotra Arena, Bergen; Attendance: 3,809; Referees: Bolic, Hurich (AUT)
5 June 2019; 19:00	2× (yellow card) 3× (suspension)	Report	2× (suspension) 1× (red card)	Sotra Arena, Bergen; Attendance: 3,809; Referees: Bolic, Hurich (AUT)

Norway won 65–49 on aggregate.

31 May 2019; 20:15	Serbia	33–19	Poland	Crystal Hall, Zrenjanin; Attendance: 2,500; Referees: Alpaizde, Berezkina (RUS)
31 May 2019; 20:15	three players 6	(17–11)	Achruk 8	Crystal Hall, Zrenjanin; Attendance: 2,500; Referees: Alpaizde, Berezkina (RUS)
31 May 2019; 20:15	2× (yellow card) 2× (suspension) 1× (red card)	Report	2× (yellow card) 3× (suspension)	Crystal Hall, Zrenjanin; Attendance: 2,500; Referees: Alpaizde, Berezkina (RUS)

6 June 2019; 18:00	Poland	30–27	Serbia	Hala RCS, Lubin; Attendance: 3,100; Referees: Kijauskaite, Zaliene (LTU)
6 June 2019; 18:00	Achruk 7	(12–14)	Krpež Slezak 8	Hala RCS, Lubin; Attendance: 3,100; Referees: Kijauskaite, Zaliene (LTU)
6 June 2019; 18:00	3× (yellow card) 2× (suspension)	Report	2× (yellow card) 4× (suspension)	Hala RCS, Lubin; Attendance: 3,100; Referees: Kijauskaite, Zaliene (LTU)

Serbia won 60–49 on aggregate.

31 May 2019; 20:10	Czech Republic	26–24	Montenegro	Sportovní hala Banik Most, Most; Attendance: 860; Referees: Mandak, Rudinsky (SVK)
31 May 2019; 20:10	Hrbková 7	(15–13)	Radičević 6	Sportovní hala Banik Most, Most; Attendance: 860; Referees: Mandak, Rudinsky (SVK)
31 May 2019; 20:10	2× (yellow card) 4× (suspension)	Report	3× (yellow card) 4× (suspension)	Sportovní hala Banik Most, Most; Attendance: 860; Referees: Mandak, Rudinsky (SVK)

5 June 2019; 20:15	Montenegro	25–23	Czech Republic	Sportski Centar Nikšić, Nikšić; Attendance: 4,078; Referees: Erdogan, Özdeniz (TUR)
5 June 2019; 20:15	Jauković 9	(12–11)	Jeřábková 5	Sportski Centar Nikšić, Nikšić; Attendance: 4,078; Referees: Erdogan, Özdeniz (TUR)
5 June 2019; 20:15	2× (yellow card) 5× (suspension)	Report	1× (yellow card) 4× (suspension)	Sportski Centar Nikšić, Nikšić; Attendance: 4,078; Referees: Erdogan, Özdeniz (TUR)

49–49 on aggregate. Montenegro won by away goals.

2 June 2019; 20:30	North Macedonia	30–33	Slovenia	Boris Trajkovski Sports Center, Skopje; Attendance: 1,250; Referees: Frieser, Kavulic (CZE)
2 June 2019; 20:30	Gjeorgjievska 9	(14–15)	Gros, Stanko 6	Boris Trajkovski Sports Center, Skopje; Attendance: 1,250; Referees: Frieser, Kavulic (CZE)
2 June 2019; 20:30	2× (yellow card) 3× (suspension)	Report	3× (yellow card) 5× (suspension)	Boris Trajkovski Sports Center, Skopje; Attendance: 1,250; Referees: Frieser, Kavulic (CZE)

6 June 2019; 20:15	Slovenia	38–27	North Macedonia	Golovec Hall, Celje; Attendance: 1,706; Referees: Brunovsky, Canda (SVK)
6 June 2019; 20:15	Mavsar 8	(20–14)	Livrinikj 6	Golovec Hall, Celje; Attendance: 1,706; Referees: Brunovsky, Canda (SVK)
6 June 2019; 20:15	2× (yellow card) 4× (suspension)	Report	2× (yellow card) 2× (suspension)	Golovec Hall, Celje; Attendance: 1,706; Referees: Brunovsky, Canda (SVK)

Slovenia won 71–57 on aggregate.

2 June 2019; 18:00	Austria	23–41	Hungary	Raiffeisen Sportpark Graz, Graz; Attendance: 1,000; Referees: Nabokau, Kulik (BLR)
2 June 2019; 18:00	Frey 9	(9–20)	Tóth 9	Raiffeisen Sportpark Graz, Graz; Attendance: 1,000; Referees: Nabokau, Kulik (BLR)
2 June 2019; 18:00	2× (yellow card) 7× (suspension)	Report	2× (yellow card) 2× (suspension)	Raiffeisen Sportpark Graz, Graz; Attendance: 1,000; Referees: Nabokau, Kulik (BLR)

5 June 2019; 18:00	Hungary	28–19	Austria	Zalaegerszeg; Attendance: 2,000; Referees: Ilieva, Karbeska (MKD)
5 June 2019; 18:00	Klujber 6	(16–10)	Frey, Kovács 5	Zalaegerszeg; Attendance: 2,000; Referees: Ilieva, Karbeska (MKD)
5 June 2019; 18:00	3× (yellow card) 4× (suspension)	Report	3× (yellow card) 1× (suspension)	Zalaegerszeg; Attendance: 2,000; Referees: Ilieva, Karbeska (MKD)

Hungary won 69–42 on aggregate.

31 May 2019; 21:00	Spain	35–26	Iceland	Polideportivo Fernando Arguelles, Antequera; Attendance: 2,200; Referees: Antic, Jakovljevic (SRB)
31 May 2019; 21:00	Pena 12	(21–7)	Stefánsdóttir 6	Polideportivo Fernando Arguelles, Antequera; Attendance: 2,200; Referees: Antic, Jakovljevic (SRB)
31 May 2019; 21:00	2× (yellow card) 3× (suspension)	Report	2× (yellow card) 2× (suspension)	Polideportivo Fernando Arguelles, Antequera; Attendance: 2,200; Referees: Antic, Jakovljevic (SRB)

6 June 2019; 19:45	Iceland	32–31	Spain	Laugardalshöll, Reykjavík; Attendance: 831; Referees: Christiansen, Hansen (DEN)
6 June 2019; 19:45	Pálsdóttir 8	(13–15)	Etxeberria 8	Laugardalshöll, Reykjavík; Attendance: 831; Referees: Christiansen, Hansen (DEN)
6 June 2019; 19:45	4× (suspension)	Report	1× (yellow card) 4× (suspension)	Laugardalshöll, Reykjavík; Attendance: 831; Referees: Christiansen, Hansen (DEN)

Spain won 66–58 on aggregate.
