= Hilli =

Hilli may refer to:

- "Hilli" (At the Top of the World), a song from the album Kurr by Icelandic band Amiina
- Battle of Hilli, a battle in the 1971 Indo-Pakistani War

== People ==
- Allamah Al-Hilli (1250–1325), Twelver Shi'a theologian and mujtahid
- Arvo Hilli (born 1930), Finnish hurdler
- Johanna Hilli (born 1994), Finnish handball player for HIFK Handboll and the Finnish national team
- Mariam Mohamed Hadi Al Hilli (born 1984), Bahraini Olympic athlete
- Muhaqqiq al-Hilli (c. 1205–1277), Islamic scholar
- Sebastian Hilli (born 1990), Finnish composer

== See also ==
- T. hilli (disambiguation)
- O. hilli (disambiguation)
- Hillis, a given name and surname
