= Hillis =

Hillis is both a given name and a surname. Notable people with the name include:

== Given name ==
- Hillis Hadjo (c. 1770–1818), a leader of the Red Stick rebellion of the Creek Indians.
- Hillis Layne (1918–2010), American third baseman in Major League Baseball
- J. Hillis Miller (1928–2021), American literary critic
- J. Hillis Miller, Sr. (1899–1953), the fourth President of the University of Florida
- Yda Hillis Addis (born 1857), American writer

== Surname ==
- Ali Hillis (born 1978), American actress
- David Hillis (21st century), prominent American herpetologist and systematic biologist
- David Hillis, (1785–1845), American politician
- Danny Hillis (born 1956) is an American inventor, entrepreneur, and scientist
- Dick Hillis (1913–2005), American Protestant Christian missionary to China
- Elwood Hillis (1926–2023), American politician
- Ivory O. Hillis Jr. (born 1930), American politician
- Leo Hillis (1920–2007), Australian rules footballer
- Llewellya Hillis, Canadian-born American marine biologist
- Mack Hillis, Major League Baseball second baseman
- Margaret Hillis (1921–1998), American conductor
- Newell Dwight Hillis (1858–1929), American writer
- Norman Hillis (21st century), Northern Ireland politician
- Peyton Hillis (born 1986), American football fullback
- Rib Hillis (born 1971), American soap opera actor
- Rick Hillis, Canadian poet and short story writer
- Ron Hillis (born 1906), Australian rules footballer
- Stewart Hillis (1943−2014), Scottish physician who held a professorship
- W. Daniel Hillis (born 1956), American inventor, entrepreneur and author
- Wally Hillis (1938–2006), Australian rules footballer
