= O. hilli =

O. hilli may refer to:

- Oliva hilli, a sea snail species
- Ophiacodon hilli, a large pelycosaur whose fossils were found in Joggins, Nova Scotia, Canada

== See also ==
- Hilli (disambiguation)
