= Lisewski =

Lisewski, feminine: Lisewska is a Polish surname. Notable people with the surname include:

- Adam Lisewski (1944–2023), Polish fencer
- Sylwia Lisewska (born 1986), Polish handball player
- Władysław Lisewski (1948–2021), Polish politician
