= T. hilli =

T. hilli may refer to:

- Taphozous hilli, the Hill's sheath-tailed bat or Hill's tomb bat, a bat species found only in Australia
- Thala hilli, a sea snail species
- Thylacoleo hilli, an extinct carnivorous marsupial species that lived in Australia from the late Pliocene to the late Pleistocene

== See also ==
- Hilli (disambiguation)
