= Brigita Ivanauskaitė =

Lithuanian handball player

Personal information
- Nationality: Lithuanian
- Born: 26 June 1998 (age 28) Lithuania
- Height: 1.80 m (5 ft 11 in)

Sport
- Sport: Handball
- Position: Centre back
- Current club: HC Rödertal

Senior clubs
- Years: Team
- –2017: RK Dragūnas Klaipėda
- 2017–2018: Fredrikstad BK
- 2018–: HC Rödertal
National team
- Years: Team
- 2015-: Lithuania

Brigita Ivanauskaitė (born 24 April 1993) is a Lithuanian handballer who plays for HC Rödertal and the Lithuania national team.

== Personal life ==
She has a twin sister named Roberta Ivanauskaitė who is also a handballer and plays abroad in Denmark.
