= Leo Hillis =

Australian rules footballer

Personal information
- Full name: Leo Kelvin Hillis
- Born: 12 January 1920; Thomastown, Victoria
- Died: 31 October 2007 (aged 87)
- Height: 180 cm (5 ft 11 in)
- Weight: 76 kg (168 lb)

Playing career^{1}
Years	Club	Games (Goals)
1939, 1944	Footscray	5 (0)
- ^{1} Playing statistics correct to the end of 1944.

Leo Kelvin Hillis (12 January 1920 – 31 October 2007) was an Australian rules footballer who played with Footscray in the Victorian Football League (VFL).

After his football career, Hillis enlisted in the Royal Australian Navy, initially serving as a radio electrician on a range of ships and rising through the ranks to the level of a RAN Commander at the point of his discharge in March 1970.
