= Dijana Ujkić =

Montenegrin handball player (born 1996)

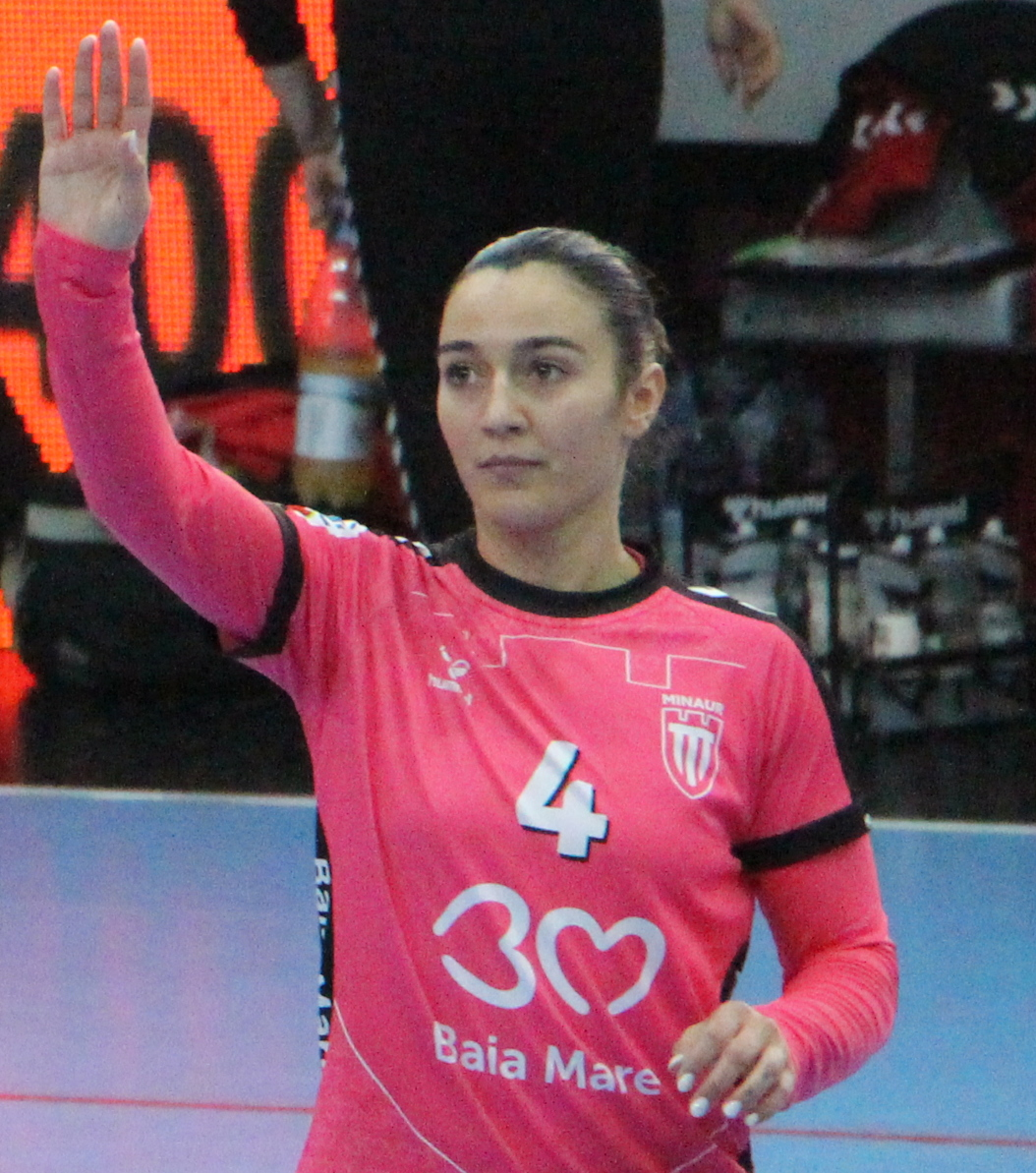

Personal information
- Born: 5 July 1996 (age 30) Podgorica, Montenegro, FR Yugoslavia
- Height: 1.72 m (5 ft 8 in)

Sport
- Sport: Handball
- Position: Right wing
- Current club: Minaur Baia Mare
- Number: 4

Senior clubs
- Years: Team
- 2013–2015: ŽRK Danilovgrad
- 2015–2019: ŽRK Budućnost Podgorica
- 2019–2020: Măgura Cisnădie
- 2020–2021: Gloria Buzău
- 2021–2022: Bourg-de-Péage
- 2022–2024: Minaur Baia Mare
- 2024–: Istogu
National team
Years	Team	Apps	(Gls)
2016–	Montenegro	58	(47)
Medal record
Mediterranean Games
Silver medal – second place	2018 Tarragona	Team

Dijana Ujkić (Albanian: Diana Ujkaj, born 5 July 1996) is a Montenegrin handball player for Istogu and the Montenegrin national team.

== International honours ==
- EHF Champions League:
  - Fourth place: 2017

== Individual awards ==
- Handball-Planet.com Young World Right Wing of the Season: 2018
