= Þórey Rósa Stefánsdóttir =

Icelandic handball player (born 1989)

Personal information
- Nationality: Icelandic
- Born: 14 August 1989 (age 37) Reykjavík, Iceland
- Height: 1.67 m (5 ft 6 in)

Sport
- Sport: Handball
- Position: Right wing
- Current club: Fram
- Number: 3

Senior clubs
- Years: Team
- 2005–2009: Fram
- 2009–2011: E&O Emmen
- 2011: VfL Oldenburg
- 2011–2013: Team Tvis Holstebro
- 2013–2017: Vipers Kristiansand
- 2017–2025: Fram
National team
Years	Team	Apps	(Gls)
-2025	Iceland	140	(405)
- Updated on 3 November 2024

Þórey Rósa Stefánsdóttir (born 14 August 1989) is an Icelandic team handball player. She plays for Fram Reykjavik and on the Icelandic national team, and participated at the 2011 World Women's Handball Championship in Brazil.

In December 2018, she was named the Icelandic Women's Handball Player of the Year.

== Trophies ==
- Icelandic Champions:
  - 2018, 2022
- Icelandic Cup:
  - 2018, 2020
- League champions:
  - 2019, 2020, 2022
- Icelandic League Cup:
  - 2017
