= Oliva hilli =

Scientific classification
- Kingdom: Animalia
- Phylum: Mollusca
- Class: Gastropoda
- Subclass: Caenogastropoda
- Order: Neogastropoda
- Family: Olividae
- Genus: Oliva
- Species: O. hilli

Binomial name
- Oliva hilli Petuch & Sargent, 1986

Species of gastropod

Oliva hilli is a species of sea snail, a marine gastropod mollusk in the family Olividae, the olives.

== Description ==
Shell size 10-15 mm, generally: the holotype is 16 mm. long.

== Distribution ==
Locus typicus: Neiafu, Vava'u Islands, Tonga.

Pacific Ocean: Tonga and New Caledonia, from depths 2 metres - 80 metres.
