= Marija Gedroit =

Lithuanian handball player

Personal information
- Nationality: Lithuanian
- Born: 21 November 1986 (age 39)
- Height: 1.80 m (5 ft 11 in)

Sport
- Sport: Handball
- Position: Left back
- Current club: SCM Gloria Buzău
- Number: 99

Senior clubs
- Years: Team
- 2003–2009: Eglė Vilnius
- 2011–2015: Haukar Hafnarfjörður
- 2015–2017: Kisvárdai KC
- 2017–2018: Bayer 04 Leverkusen
- 2018–2019: SCM Gloria Buzău
National team
- Years: Team
- –: Lithuania
- Updated on 1 November 2017

Marija Gedroit (born 21 November 1986) is a Lithuanian handballer who plays for Romanian club SCM Gloria Buzău and the Lithuania national team.
