= Mónica Soares =

Portuguese handball player (born 1994)

Mónica Oliveira Soares
Personal information
- Nationality: Portuguese
- Born: 5 July 1994 (age 32) Aveiro, Portugal
- Height: 175 cm (69 in)

Sport
- Sport: Handball
- Position: Left back

Youth career
- Years: Team
- 2004-2011: CP Valongo Vouga

Senior clubs
- Years: Team
- 2011–2012: C.S. Madeira
- 2012–2013: Madeira Andebol SAD
- 2013–2017: AC Alavarium
- 2017–2019: Madeira Andebol SAD
- 2019–2020: Fuchse Berlin
- 2020–2021: BM Porriño
- 2021–2022: AC Alavarium
- 2022–2024: AA São Pedro do Sul
National team
Years	Team	Apps	(Gls)
2012-2024	Portugal	9	(32)

Mónica Soares (born 5 July 1994) is a Portuguese handballer who plays for Alavarium/Love Tiles and the Portugal national team.

== Achievements ==
- 1ª Divisão de Andebol Feminino:
  - Winner: 2014, 2015

== Individual awards ==
- Top Scorer of the U-19 European Championship in 2013
