= Ivory O. Hillis Jr. =

American politician

Member of the Tennessee House of Representatives from the 43rd district
- In office 1971–1995

Personal details
- Born: June 30, 1930 (age 96) Warren County, Tennessee
- Occupation: broadcaster

Ivory O. Hillis Jr. (born June 30, 1930), is an American politician in the state of Tennessee. Hillis served in the Tennessee House of Representatives from 1971 to 1995. Hillis Chaired the House Veterans Affairs Committee, Chaired the House Conservation Committee and also served on the House Finance Ways and Means Committee. A United States Air Force veteran, he was a broadcaster and attended the Tennessee School of Broadcasting. Hillis, a Democrat, represented the 43rd legislative district, he resided much of his career in Sparta, Tennessee but resided in McMinnville, Tennessee at the time he retired in 1995. Hillis is a member of the Church of Christ. He was married for 69 years to Oma Lee Fults Hillis who died March 15, 2020, and they have 5 children with family currently totaling more than 70.
