= Mária Holešová =

Slovak handball player (born 1993)

Personal information
- Nationality: Slovak
- Born: 24 April 1993 (age 33) Bytča, Slovakia
- Height: 1.63 m (5 ft 4 in)

Sport
- Sport: Handball
- Position: Left wing
- Current club: Mosonmagyaróvári KC SE

Senior clubs
- Years: Team
- –2013: MHK Bytča
- 2013–2018: IUVENTA Michalovce
- 2018–2019: RK Podravka Koprivnica
- 2019–2021: Mosonmagyaróvári KC SE
National team
- Years: Team
- 2015–: Slovakia

Mária Holešová (born 24 April 1993) is a Slovak handballer who plays for Mosonmagyaróvári KC SE and the Slovakia national team.

== Achievements ==
- Czech-Slovak Interliga:
  - Winner: 2014, 2015, 2016, 2017
- Slovak Pohár:
  - Winner: 2014, 2015, 2016, 2017
- Croatian First League:
  - Winner: 2019
