= Monika Rajnohová =

Slovak handball player (born 1993)

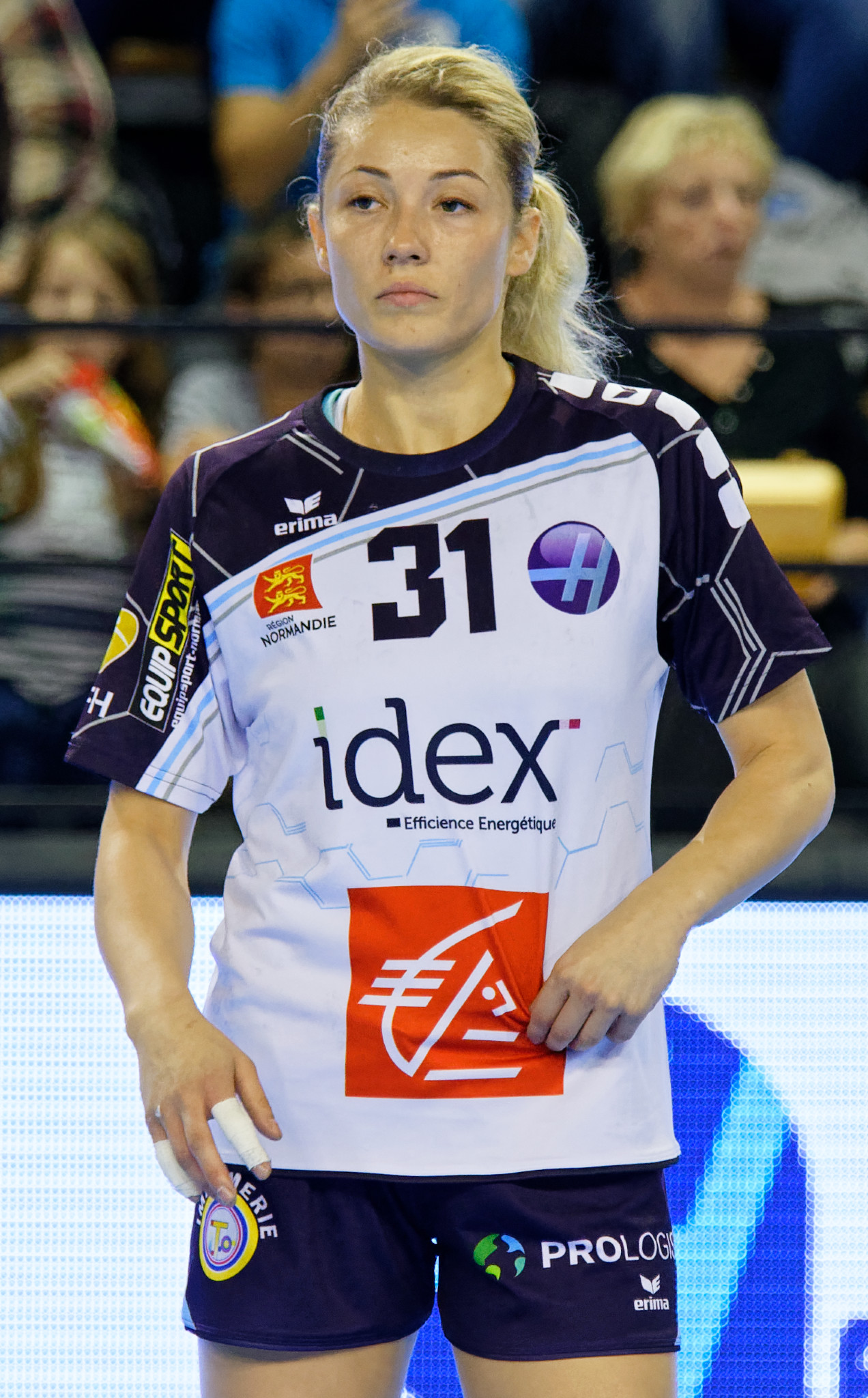
- 7 October 2017

Personal information
- Nationality: Slovak
- Born: 26 May 1993 (age 33) Žilina, Slovakia
- Height: 1.73 m (5 ft 8 in)

Sport
- Sport: Handball
- Position: Centre back
- Current club: HC DAC Dunajská Streda
- Number: 31

Senior clubs
- Years: Team
- –2011: HK AS Trenčín
- 2011–2013: HK Britterm Veselí nad Moravou
- 2013–2015: DHC Slavia Prague
- 2015–2016: Mosonmagyaróvári KC SE
- 2016–2017: Skara HF
- 2017: HK AS Trenčín
- 2017–2018: Le Havre AC
- 2018–2019: ESBF Besançon
- 2019–2021: HC DAC Dunajská Streda
National team
Years	Team	Apps	(Gls)
–	Slovakia	29	(26)

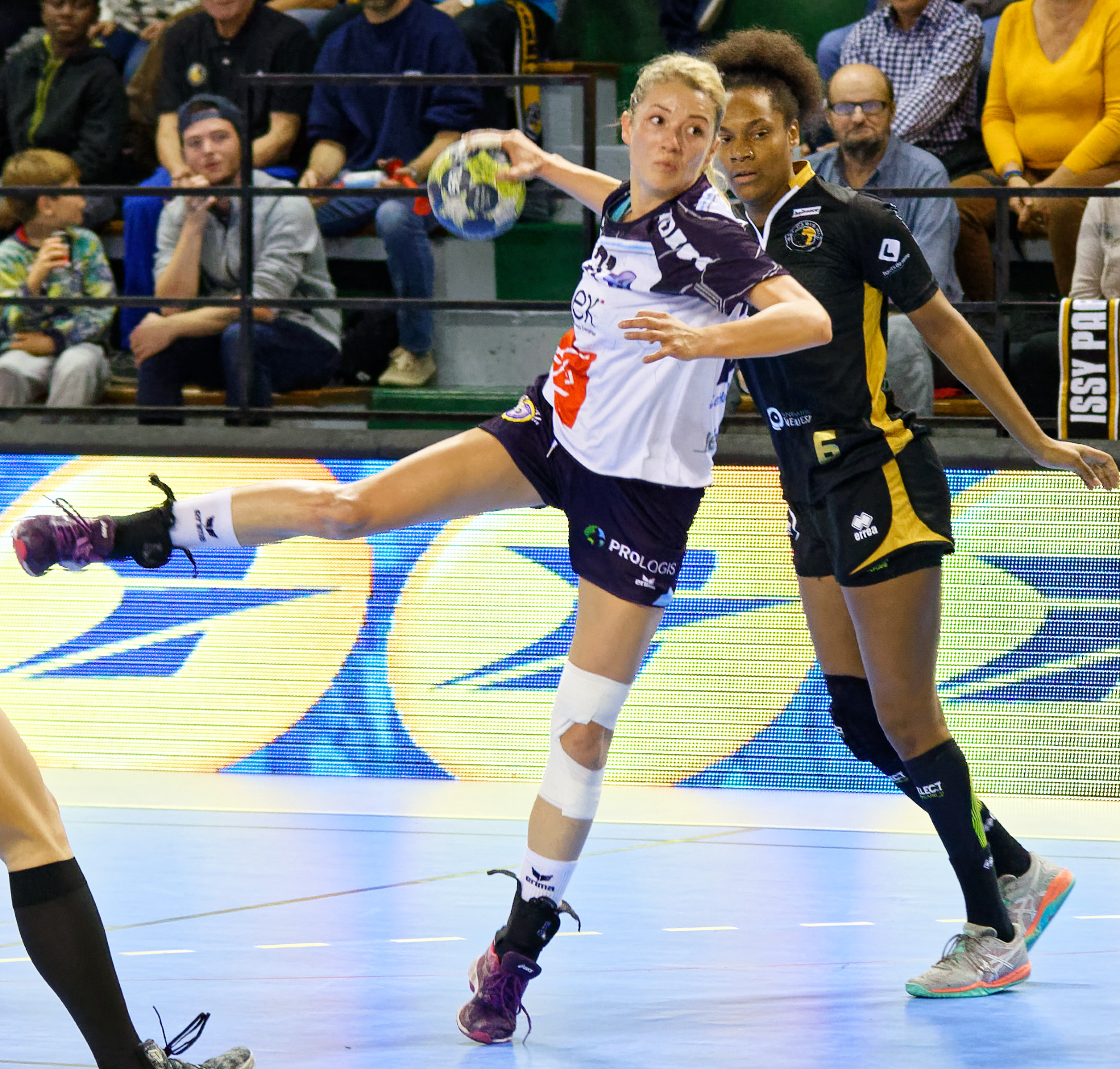
7 October 2017

Monika Rajnohová (born 26 May 1993) is a Slovak former handball player who played for HC DAC Dunajská Streda and the Slovak national team.

She represented Slovakia at the 2014 European Women's Handball Championship, where they finished 12th.

She retired in 2021.
