= Nataliya Kotsina =

Belarusian handball player (born 1991)

Personal information
- Nationality: Belarusian
- Born: 7 September 1991 (age 35) Grodno, Byelorussian SSR, Soviet Union
- Height: 1.75 m (5 ft 9 in)

Sport
- Sport: Handball
- Position: Left Wing
- Current club: Kastamonu Bld. GSK
- Number: 11
National team
- Years: Team
- –: Belarus

Nataliya Kotsina (born Belarusian: Наталля Коціна; 7 September 1991) is a Belarusian handballer playing in the Turkish Women's Handball Super League for Kastamonu Bld. GSK and the Belarısian national team. The 1.75 m (5 ft 9 in)-tall sportswoman plays in the left wing position.

In January 2015, she transferred from SHC Gorodnichanka Grodno in her country to the Antalya-based Muratpaşa Bld. SK, which play in the Turkish Women's Handball Super League. She took part at the 2015–16 Women's EHF Cup.
