= Sylwia Lisewska =

Polish handball player (born 1986)

Personal information
- Nationality: Polish
- Born: 31 May 1986 (age 40) Suwałki, Poland
- Height: 1.84 m (6 ft 0 in)

Sport
- Sport: Handball
- Position: Left back
- Current club: Măgura Cisnădie

Senior clubs
- Years: Team
- 2003–2011: Piotrcovia Piotrków
- 2011–2014: AZS Koszalin
- 2014–2018: EB Start Elbląg
- 2018–2020: Minaur Baia Mare
- 2020–: Măgura Cisnădie
National team
Years	Team	Apps	(Gls)
2007–	Poland	27	(72)

Sylwia Lisewska (born 31 May 1986) is a Polish handballer for Măgura Cisnădie and the Polish national team.

== International honours ==
- Carpathian Trophy:
  - Winner: 2017

== Individual awards ==
- Ekstraklasa Top Scorer: 2017, 2018
