= Johanna Hilli =

Finnish handball player (born 1994)

Personal information
- Nationality: Finnish
- Born: 14 May 1994 (age 32) Espoo, Finland
- Height: 1.70 m (5 ft 7 in)

Sport
- Sport: Handball
- Position: Centre Back
- Current club: GRIFK Handboll
- Number: 7
National team
- Years: Team
- –: Finland

Johanna Hilli (born 14 May 1994) is a Finnish handball player for GRIFK Handboll and the Finnish national team. She has previously played for Swedish club Kristianstad Handboll.
