= Lithuania women's national handball team =

Lithuania

Information
- Association: Lithuanian Handball Federation
- Coach: Herlander Silva

Colours
1st	2nd

Results

World Championship
- Appearances: 1 (First in 1993)
- Best result: 13th (1993)

European Championship
- Appearances: 1 (First in 1996)
- Best result: 12th (1996)
- Last updated on Unknown.

The Lithuania women's national handball team is the national handball team of Lithuania and takes part in international team handball competitions.

== Results ==
=== World Championship ===
- 1993 – 13th

=== European Championship ===
- 1996 – 12th
