= Norma Goldmann =

Swiss handball player

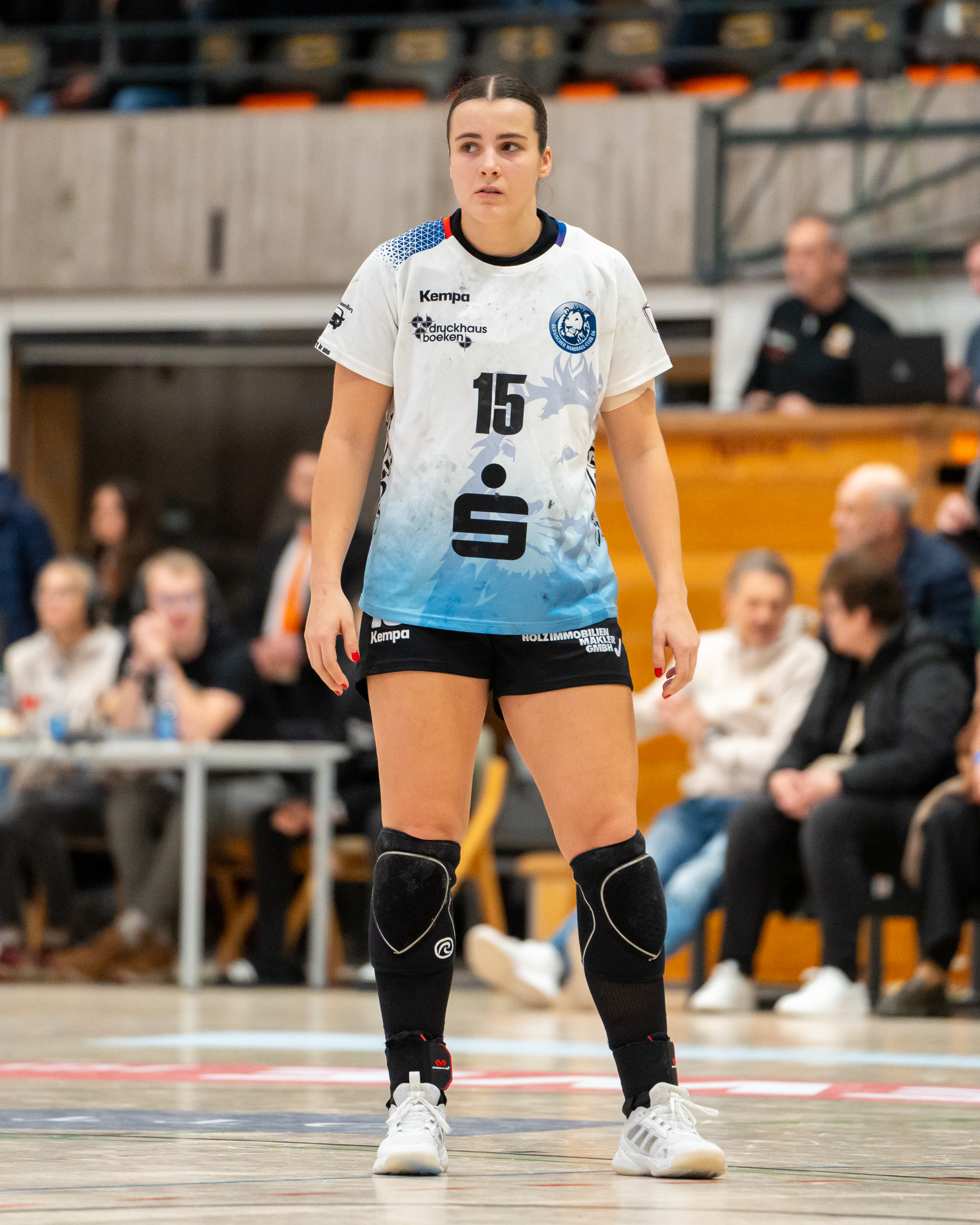
- Goldmann in 2025

Personal information
- Full name: Norma Goldmann
- Nationality: Swiss
- Born: 6 October 2003 (age 23) Steinhausen, Switzerland
- Height: 1.72 m (5 ft 8 in)

Sport
- Sport: Handball
- Position: Left back
- Current club: HSG Bensheim/Auerbach
- Number: 62

Senior clubs
- Years: Team
- 2022–2023: LK Zug
- 2023–2024: HSG Bad Wildungen
- 2024–2025: Kristianstad Handboll
- 2025–: HSG Bensheim/Auerbach
National team
Years	Team	Apps	(Gls)
2021–	Switzerland	33	(29)
- Updated on 14 November 2025

Norma Goldmann (born 6 October 2003) is a Swiss female handballer for HSG Bensheim/Auerbach in Germany and the Swiss national team. She has previously played for HSG Bad Wildungen in the Frauen Handball-Bundesliga and Kristianstad Handboll.

Goldmann made her official debut on the Swiss national team on 6 October 2023, against Russia at the age 18 years. She represented Switzerland for the first time at the 2024 European Women's Handball Championship in Switzerland, Hungary and Austria.

== Achievements ==
- SPAR Premium League
  - Finalist: 2022
- Swiss Women's Cup
  - Winner: 2022
