= 2016 European Women's Handball Championship qualification =

This article describes the qualification for the 2016 European Women's Handball Championship.

== Qualification system ==
The draw was held in Vienna, Austria on 24 March 2015 at 11:30 local time. Sweden as host nation was directly qualified. 32 teams had registered for participation and compete for 14 places at the final tournament in 2 distinct Qualification Phases. The group winners of phase 1 advanced to phase 2. The 28 teams were divided into seven groups of four teams. The top two teams qualified for the main tournament as well as the best-ranked third placed team, where the results against the last-placed team were revoked.

== Qualification Phase 1 ==
The groups played in a tournament format from 12–14 June 2015. The group winners advanced to the second phase.

=== Group A ===
Pos	Team	Pld	W	D	L	GF	GA	GD	Pts	Qualification
1	Bulgaria	2	2	0	0	63	50	+13	4	Qualification phase 2
2	Azerbaijan	2	1	0	1	57	60	−3	2	
3	Faroe Islands	2	0	0	2	50	60	−10	0	

Source: Eurohandball
Rules for classification: 1) points; 2) head-to-head points; 3) head-to-head goal difference; 4) head-to-head number of goals scored; 5) goal difference.

12 June 2015; 18:00	Bulgaria	31–22	Faroe Islands	Orlovetz Hall, Gabrovo; Attendance: 1,000; Referees: Ilieva, Karbeska (MKD)
12 June 2015; 18:00	Dobreva 11	(12–10)	Samuelsen 7	Orlovetz Hall, Gabrovo; Attendance: 1,000; Referees: Ilieva, Karbeska (MKD)
12 June 2015; 18:00	3× (yellow card) 1× (suspension)	Report	3× (yellow card) 3× (suspension)	Orlovetz Hall, Gabrovo; Attendance: 1,000; Referees: Ilieva, Karbeska (MKD)

13 June 2015; 18:00	Faroe Islands	28–29	Azerbaijan	Orlovetz Hall, Gabrovo; Attendance: 300; Referees: Ilieva, Karbeska (MKD)
13 June 2015; 18:00	Samuelsen 10	(14–14)	Tankaskaya 7	Orlovetz Hall, Gabrovo; Attendance: 300; Referees: Ilieva, Karbeska (MKD)
13 June 2015; 18:00	3× (yellow card) 6× (suspension)	Report	3× (yellow card) 4× (suspension) 1× (red card)	Orlovetz Hall, Gabrovo; Attendance: 300; Referees: Ilieva, Karbeska (MKD)

14 June 2015; 18:00	Azerbaijan	28–32	Bulgaria	Orlovetz Hall, Gabrovo; Attendance: 850; Referees: Ilieva, Karbeska (MKD)
14 June 2015; 18:00	Tankaskaya 7	(12–13)	Bogdanova, Omoregie 8	Orlovetz Hall, Gabrovo; Attendance: 850; Referees: Ilieva, Karbeska (MKD)
14 June 2015; 18:00	3× (yellow card) 3× (suspension)	Report	3× (yellow card) 2× (suspension)	Orlovetz Hall, Gabrovo; Attendance: 850; Referees: Ilieva, Karbeska (MKD)

=== Group B ===
Pos	Team	Pld	W	D	L	GF	GA	GD	Pts	Qualification
1	Finland	2	2	0	0	53	42	+11	4	Qualification phase 2
2	Israel	2	1	0	1	47	47	0	2	
3	Kosovo	2	0	0	2	40	51	−11	0	

Source: Eurohandball
Rules for classification: 1) points; 2) head-to-head points; 3) head-to-head goal difference; 4) head-to-head number of goals scored; 5) goal difference.

12 June 2015; 19:00	Kosovo	19–27	Finland	Sisu Arena, Karis; Attendance: 360; Referees: Markovska, Vutov (BUL)
12 June 2015; 19:00	Beka 7	(6–12)	Roos 7	Sisu Arena, Karis; Attendance: 360; Referees: Markovska, Vutov (BUL)
12 June 2015; 19:00	2× (yellow card) 4× (suspension)	Report	2× (yellow card) 4× (suspension)	Sisu Arena, Karis; Attendance: 360; Referees: Markovska, Vutov (BUL)

13 June 2015; 16:00	Israel	24–21	Kosovo	Sisu Arena, Karis; Attendance: 80; Referees: Markovska, Vutov (BUL)
13 June 2015; 16:00	Vikrat 7	(9–8)	Rama 5	Sisu Arena, Karis; Attendance: 80; Referees: Markovska, Vutov (BUL)
13 June 2015; 16:00	2× (yellow card) 1× (suspension) 1× (red card)	Report	3× (yellow card) 5× (suspension)	Sisu Arena, Karis; Attendance: 80; Referees: Markovska, Vutov (BUL)

14 June 2015; 12:00	Finland	26–23	Israel	Sisu Arena, Karis; Attendance: 320; Referees: Markovska, Vutov (BUL)
14 June 2015; 12:00	Lindholm 9	(18–15)	Turgeman, Vikrat 6	Sisu Arena, Karis; Attendance: 320; Referees: Markovska, Vutov (BUL)
14 June 2015; 12:00	3× (yellow card) 4× (suspension)	Report	3× (yellow card) 2× (suspension)	Sisu Arena, Karis; Attendance: 320; Referees: Markovska, Vutov (BUL)

== Qualification Phase 2 ==
The draw was held on 9 April 2015 in Kristianstad, Sweden.

=== Seeding ===
Pot 1	Pot 2	Pot 3	Pot 4
Norway; Montenegro; Denmark; Hungary; Serbia; France; Spain	Germany; Romania; Poland; Russia; Netherlands; Czech Republic; Croatia	Slovakia; Ukraine; Iceland; Macedonia; Turkey; Belarus; Austria	Slovenia; Portugal; Switzerland; Italy; Lithuania; Bulgaria; Finland

=== Group 1 ===
Pos	Team	Pld	W	D	L	GF	GA	GD	Pts	Qualification
1	Norway	6	5	0	1	178	128	+50	10	Final tournament
2	Romania	6	4	0	2	150	137	+13	8	Final tournament
3	Belarus	6	3	0	3	159	168	−9	6	Best third-ranked team qualify for final tournament
4	Lithuania	6	0	0	6	140	194	−54	0	

Source: Eurohandball
Rules for classification: 1) points; 2) head-to-head points; 3) head-to-head goal difference; 4) head-to-head number of goals scored; 5) goal difference.

7 October 2015; 19:00	Norway	35–24	Belarus	Trondheim Spektrum, Trondheim; Attendance: 3,160; Referees: Antić, Jakovljević (SRB)
7 October 2015; 19:00	Løke 7	(19–13)	Nestsiaruk 7	Trondheim Spektrum, Trondheim; Attendance: 3,160; Referees: Antić, Jakovljević (SRB)
7 October 2015; 19:00	2× (yellow card) 2× (suspension)	Report	3× (yellow card) 5× (suspension)	Trondheim Spektrum, Trondheim; Attendance: 3,160; Referees: Antić, Jakovljević (SRB)

8 October 2015; 19:00	Romania	29–20	Lithuania	Traian Sports Hall, Râmnicu Vâlcea; Attendance: 3,000; Referees: Madsen, Mortensen (DEN)
8 October 2015; 19:00	Neagu 8	(16–10)	Bernatavičiūtė 6	Traian Sports Hall, Râmnicu Vâlcea; Attendance: 3,000; Referees: Madsen, Mortensen (DEN)
8 October 2015; 19:00	2× (yellow card) 4× (suspension)	Report	3× (yellow card) 4× (suspension)	Traian Sports Hall, Râmnicu Vâlcea; Attendance: 3,000; Referees: Madsen, Mortensen (DEN)

11 October 2015; 13:00	Lithuania	21–28	Norway	Kaunas Sports Hall, Kaunas; Attendance: 850; Referees: Bonifert-Oláh (HUN)
11 October 2015; 13:00	Bernatavičiūtė 6	(9–13)	Mørk 5	Kaunas Sports Hall, Kaunas; Attendance: 850; Referees: Bonifert-Oláh (HUN)
11 October 2015; 13:00	2× (yellow card) 4× (suspension)	Report	2× (yellow card) 3× (suspension)	Kaunas Sports Hall, Kaunas; Attendance: 850; Referees: Bonifert-Oláh (HUN)

11 October 2015; 15:00	Belarus	23–25	Romania	Minsk Sports Palace, Minsk; Attendance: 3,215; Referees: Schilha, Schilha (GER)
11 October 2015; 15:00	Artsiukhovich 6	(14–12)	Neagu 11	Minsk Sports Palace, Minsk; Attendance: 3,215; Referees: Schilha, Schilha (GER)
11 October 2015; 15:00	3× (yellow card) 3× (suspension)	Report	3× (yellow card) 2× (suspension)	Minsk Sports Palace, Minsk; Attendance: 3,215; Referees: Schilha, Schilha (GER)

9 March 2016; 19:00	Lithuania	21–29	Belarus	Kaunas Sports Hall, Kaunas; Attendance: 500; Referees: Dvorský, Karlubík (SVK)
9 March 2016; 19:00	Šatkauskaitė 9	(10–15)	Yezhykava 6	Kaunas Sports Hall, Kaunas; Attendance: 500; Referees: Dvorský, Karlubík (SVK)
9 March 2016; 19:00	3× (yellow card) 3× (suspension)	Report	3× (yellow card) 5× (suspension)	Kaunas Sports Hall, Kaunas; Attendance: 500; Referees: Dvorský, Karlubík (SVK)

9 March 2016; 20:00	Romania	25–20	Norway	Polyvalent Hall, Cluj-Napoca; Attendance: 7,100; Referees: Pandžić, Šatordžija (BIH)
9 March 2016; 20:00	Neagu 10	(16–9)	Mørk 6	Polyvalent Hall, Cluj-Napoca; Attendance: 7,100; Referees: Pandžić, Šatordžija (BIH)
9 March 2016; 20:00	3× (yellow card) 8× (suspension) 1× (red card)	Report	3× (yellow card) 6× (suspension)	Polyvalent Hall, Cluj-Napoca; Attendance: 7,100; Referees: Pandžić, Šatordžija (BIH)

13 March 2016; 17:00	Belarus	38–35	Lithuania	Minsk Sports Palace, Minsk; Attendance: 2,650; Referees: Bounouara, Sami (FRA)
13 March 2016; 17:00	Yezhykava 8	(18–15)	three players 7	Minsk Sports Palace, Minsk; Attendance: 2,650; Referees: Bounouara, Sami (FRA)
13 March 2016; 17:00	2× (yellow card) 5× (suspension)	Report	3× (yellow card) 4× (suspension)	Minsk Sports Palace, Minsk; Attendance: 2,650; Referees: Bounouara, Sami (FRA)

13 March 2016; 18:00	Norway	27–17	Romania	Stavanger Idrettshall, Stavanger; Attendance: 6,000; Referees: Santos, Fonseca (POR)
13 March 2016; 18:00	Løke 7	(12–8)	Vizitiu 6	Stavanger Idrettshall, Stavanger; Attendance: 6,000; Referees: Santos, Fonseca (POR)
13 March 2016; 18:00	2× (yellow card) 3× (suspension)	Report	2× (yellow card) 1× (suspension)	Stavanger Idrettshall, Stavanger; Attendance: 6,000; Referees: Santos, Fonseca (POR)

1 June 2016; 19:00	Belarus	22–32	Norway	Sport Palace Uruchje, Minsk; Attendance: 2,200; Referees: Tzaferopoulos, Bethmann (GRE)
1 June 2016; 19:00	Yezhykava 7	(9–15)	Sulland 6	Sport Palace Uruchje, Minsk; Attendance: 2,200; Referees: Tzaferopoulos, Bethmann (GRE)
1 June 2016; 19:00	3× (yellow card) 1× (red card)	Report	3× (yellow card) 2× (suspension)	Sport Palace Uruchje, Minsk; Attendance: 2,200; Referees: Tzaferopoulos, Bethmann (GRE)

1 June 2016; 19:00	Lithuania	24–34	Romania	Kaunas Sports Hall, Kaunas; Attendance: 500; Referees: Markovska, Vutov (BUL)
1 June 2016; 19:00	Ivanauskaitė 7	(11–20)	Chintoan 6	Kaunas Sports Hall, Kaunas; Attendance: 500; Referees: Markovska, Vutov (BUL)
1 June 2016; 19:00	3× (yellow card)	Report	2× (yellow card) 8× (suspension)	Kaunas Sports Hall, Kaunas; Attendance: 500; Referees: Markovska, Vutov (BUL)

4 June 2016; 19:00	Romania	20–23	Belarus	Polyvalent Hall, Piatra Neamţ; Attendance: 3,800; Referees: Bennani, Bennani (SWE)
4 June 2016; 19:00	Pîrvuț 5	(9–9)	Yezhykava 9	Polyvalent Hall, Piatra Neamţ; Attendance: 3,800; Referees: Bennani, Bennani (SWE)
4 June 2016; 19:00	3× (yellow card) 2× (suspension)	Report	3× (yellow card) 4× (suspension) 1× (red card)	Polyvalent Hall, Piatra Neamţ; Attendance: 3,800; Referees: Bennani, Bennani (SWE)

4 June 2016; 19:30	Norway	36–19	Lithuania	Oslo Spektrum, Oslo; Attendance: 3,945; Referees: Schols, Zuijlen (NED)
4 June 2016; 19:30	Kurtović 6	(15–10)	Ivanauskaitė, Šatkauskaitė 5	Oslo Spektrum, Oslo; Attendance: 3,945; Referees: Schols, Zuijlen (NED)
4 June 2016; 19:30	3× (yellow card) 4× (suspension)	Report	3× (yellow card) 5× (suspension)	Oslo Spektrum, Oslo; Attendance: 3,945; Referees: Schols, Zuijlen (NED)

=== Group 2 ===
Pos	Team	Pld	W	D	L	GF	GA	GD	Pts	Qualification
1	Serbia	6	5	1	0	191	141	+50	11	Final tournament
2	Czech Republic	6	4	1	1	170	142	+28	9	Final tournament
3	Ukraine	6	2	0	4	174	162	+12	4	Best third-ranked team qualify for final tournament
4	Italy	6	0	0	6	113	203	−90	0	

Source: Eurohandball
Rules for classification: 1) points; 2) head-to-head points; 3) head-to-head goal difference; 4) head-to-head number of goals scored; 5) goal difference.

7 October 2015; 16:05	Czech Republic	33–15	Italy	Aréna Sparta Podvinný Mlýn, Prague; Attendance: 1,020; Referees: Žalienė, Kijauskaitė (LTU)
7 October 2015; 16:05	Hrbková, Jeřábková 5	(14–5)	Niederwieser 8	Aréna Sparta Podvinný Mlýn, Prague; Attendance: 1,020; Referees: Žalienė, Kijauskaitė (LTU)
7 October 2015; 16:05	2× (yellow card) 3× (suspension)	Report	3× (yellow card) 7× (suspension)	Aréna Sparta Podvinný Mlýn, Prague; Attendance: 1,020; Referees: Žalienė, Kijauskaitė (LTU)

8 October 2015; 18:00	Serbia	34–25	Ukraine	Kraljevo Sports Hall, Kraljevo; Attendance: 1,200; Referees: Florescu, Stoia (ROU)
8 October 2015; 18:00	Radosavljević 9	(14–12)	Nikolayenko 9	Kraljevo Sports Hall, Kraljevo; Attendance: 1,200; Referees: Florescu, Stoia (ROU)
8 October 2015; 18:00	3× (yellow card) 1× (suspension)	Report	3× (yellow card) 2× (suspension)	Kraljevo Sports Hall, Kraljevo; Attendance: 1,200; Referees: Florescu, Stoia (ROU)

11 October 2015; 18:00	Ukraine	20–24	Czech Republic	SK Yunist Uzhhorod, Uzhhorod; Attendance: 1,000; Referees: Lesiak, Lidacka (POL)
11 October 2015; 18:00	Borshchenko, Perederiy 5	(12–8)	Kordovská 7	SK Yunist Uzhhorod, Uzhhorod; Attendance: 1,000; Referees: Lesiak, Lidacka (POL)
11 October 2015; 18:00	3× (yellow card) 7× (suspension)	Report	3× (yellow card) 3× (suspension)	SK Yunist Uzhhorod, Uzhhorod; Attendance: 1,000; Referees: Lesiak, Lidacka (POL)

11 October 2015; 19:00	Italy	19–32	Serbia	Palazzetto dello Sport Andria, Andria; Attendance: 1,350; Referees: Kiyashko, Kiselev (RUS)
11 October 2015; 19:00	Niederwieser 8	(10–15)	Živković 8	Palazzetto dello Sport Andria, Andria; Attendance: 1,350; Referees: Kiyashko, Kiselev (RUS)
11 October 2015; 19:00	3× (yellow card) 5× (suspension)	Report	3× (yellow card) 3× (suspension)	Palazzetto dello Sport Andria, Andria; Attendance: 1,350; Referees: Kiyashko, Kiselev (RUS)

9 March 2016; 18:00	Czech Republic	25–30	Serbia	Euronics Arena, Zlín; Attendance: 1,400; Referees: Hansen, Pettersen (NOR)
9 March 2016; 18:00	Hrbková 7	(15–17)	Krpež Slezak 7	Euronics Arena, Zlín; Attendance: 1,400; Referees: Hansen, Pettersen (NOR)
9 March 2016; 18:00	3× (yellow card) 3× (suspension)	Report	3× (yellow card) 5× (suspension)	Euronics Arena, Zlín; Attendance: 1,400; Referees: Hansen, Pettersen (NOR)

10 March 2016; 19:00	Italy	19–37	Ukraine	PalaGolfo, Follonica; Attendance: 1,350; Referees: Thomassen, Schmack (BEL)
10 March 2016; 19:00	Niederwieser 10	(10–18)	Borshchenko 10	PalaGolfo, Follonica; Attendance: 1,350; Referees: Thomassen, Schmack (BEL)
10 March 2016; 19:00	3× (yellow card) 3× (suspension)	Report	3× (yellow card) 2× (suspension)	PalaGolfo, Follonica; Attendance: 1,350; Referees: Thomassen, Schmack (BEL)

13 March 2016; 15:30	Ukraine	36–23	Italy	SK Yunist Uzhhorod, Uzhhorod; Attendance: 800; Referees: Praštalo, Todorović (BIH)
13 March 2016; 15:30	Borshchenko 8	(15–6)	Costa, Gheorghe 5	SK Yunist Uzhhorod, Uzhhorod; Attendance: 800; Referees: Praštalo, Todorović (BIH)
13 March 2016; 15:30	3× (yellow card) 7× (suspension)	Report	3× (yellow card) 5× (suspension)	SK Yunist Uzhhorod, Uzhhorod; Attendance: 800; Referees: Praštalo, Todorović (BIH)

13 March 2016; 18:00	Serbia	28–28	Czech Republic	Kraljevo Sports Hall, Kraljevo; Attendance: 2,000; Referees: Doychinov, Goretsov (BUL)
13 March 2016; 18:00	Krpež Slezak 9	(15–15)	Hrbková 5	Kraljevo Sports Hall, Kraljevo; Attendance: 2,000; Referees: Doychinov, Goretsov (BUL)
13 March 2016; 18:00	3× (yellow card) 5× (suspension)	Report	3× (yellow card) 2× (suspension)	Kraljevo Sports Hall, Kraljevo; Attendance: 2,000; Referees: Doychinov, Goretsov (BUL)

1 June 2016; 19:00	Ukraine	26–31	Serbia	Palace of Sports, Kyiv; Attendance: 980; Referees: Mandák, Rudinský (SVK)
1 June 2016; 19:00	Glibko 9	(12–15)	Krpež Slezak 7	Palace of Sports, Kyiv; Attendance: 980; Referees: Mandák, Rudinský (SVK)
1 June 2016; 19:00	2× (yellow card) 4× (suspension)	Report	3× (yellow card) 7× (suspension)	Palace of Sports, Kyiv; Attendance: 980; Referees: Mandák, Rudinský (SVK)

1 June 2016; 20:00	Italy	19–29	Czech Republic	Pala di San Giacomo dell'Orio, Bari; Attendance: 1,000; Referees: Christiansen, Hansen (DEN)
1 June 2016; 20:00	Gheorghe 8	(11–15)	Hrbková, Kordovská 5	Pala di San Giacomo dell'Orio, Bari; Attendance: 1,000; Referees: Christiansen, Hansen (DEN)
1 June 2016; 20:00	3× (yellow card) 5× (suspension)	Report	3× (yellow card) 1× (suspension)	Pala di San Giacomo dell'Orio, Bari; Attendance: 1,000; Referees: Christiansen, Hansen (DEN)

4 June 2016; 18:00	Serbia	36–18	Italy	Kraljevo Sports Hall, Kraljevo; Attendance: 700; Referees: Bonifert, Oláh (HUN)
4 June 2016; 18:00	Krpež Slezak 7	(21–10)	Gheorghe 6	Kraljevo Sports Hall, Kraljevo; Attendance: 700; Referees: Bonifert, Oláh (HUN)
4 June 2016; 18:00	3× (yellow card) 4× (suspension)	Report	3× (yellow card) 4× (suspension)	Kraljevo Sports Hall, Kraljevo; Attendance: 700; Referees: Bonifert, Oláh (HUN)

4 June 2016; 18:10	Czech Republic	31–30	Ukraine	Sportovni hala Banik Most, Most; Attendance: 925; Referees: Vitaku, Vitaku (KOS)
4 June 2016; 18:10	Jeřábková 8	(15–12)	Glibko 10	Sportovni hala Banik Most, Most; Attendance: 925; Referees: Vitaku, Vitaku (KOS)
4 June 2016; 18:10	3× (yellow card) 1× (suspension)	Report	3× (yellow card) 2× (suspension)	Sportovni hala Banik Most, Most; Attendance: 925; Referees: Vitaku, Vitaku (KOS)

=== Group 3 ===
Pos	Team	Pld	W	D	L	GF	GA	GD	Pts	Qualification
1	Netherlands	6	5	0	1	216	140	+76	10	Final tournament
2	Spain	6	5	0	1	192	126	+66	10	Final tournament
3	Austria	6	2	0	4	160	171	−11	4	Best third-ranked team qualify for final tournament
4	Bulgaria	6	0	0	6	112	243	−131	0	

Source: Eurohandball
Rules for classification: 1) points; 2) head-to-head points; 3) head-to-head goal difference; 4) head-to-head number of goals scored; 5) goal difference.

7 October 2015; 19:30	Netherlands	45–24	Bulgaria	Topsportcentrum Rotterdam, Rotterdam; Attendance: 2,000; Referees: Sirbu, Suponicov (MDA)
7 October 2015; 19:30	Abbingh 7	(24–16)	Omoregie 8	Topsportcentrum Rotterdam, Rotterdam; Attendance: 2,000; Referees: Sirbu, Suponicov (MDA)
7 October 2015; 19:30	3× (yellow card) 3× (suspension)	Report	3× (yellow card) 5× (suspension)	Topsportcentrum Rotterdam, Rotterdam; Attendance: 2,000; Referees: Sirbu, Suponicov (MDA)

7 October 2015; 20:45	Spain	25–15	Austria	Multiúsos Fontes do Sar, Santiago de Compostela; Attendance: 2,800; Referees: Leandersson, Lindroos (FIN)
7 October 2015; 20:45	López Herrero 5	(13–6)	Engel 5	Multiúsos Fontes do Sar, Santiago de Compostela; Attendance: 2,800; Referees: Leandersson, Lindroos (FIN)
7 October 2015; 20:45	3× (yellow card) 2× (suspension)	Report	3× (yellow card) 2× (suspension)	Multiúsos Fontes do Sar, Santiago de Compostela; Attendance: 2,800; Referees: Leandersson, Lindroos (FIN)

11 October 2015; 17:00	Bulgaria	14–39	Spain	Orlovetz Hall, Gabrovo; Attendance: 500; Referees: Brehmer, Skowronek (POL)
11 October 2015; 17:00	Kotseva 3	(8–20)	Alberto 6	Orlovetz Hall, Gabrovo; Attendance: 500; Referees: Brehmer, Skowronek (POL)
11 October 2015; 17:00	3× (yellow card) 1× (suspension)	Report	3× (yellow card) 1× (suspension)	Orlovetz Hall, Gabrovo; Attendance: 500; Referees: Brehmer, Skowronek (POL)

11 October 2015; 18:15	Austria	25–31	Netherlands	Bundessport- und Freizeitzentrum Südstadt, Maria Enzersdorf; Attendance: 800; Referees: Vujačić, Kažanegra (MNE)
11 October 2015; 18:15	Engel 7	(11–13)	Abbingh 6	Bundessport- und Freizeitzentrum Südstadt, Maria Enzersdorf; Attendance: 800; Referees: Vujačić, Kažanegra (MNE)
11 October 2015; 18:15	2× (yellow card) 3× (suspension)	Report	2× (yellow card) 5× (suspension)	Bundessport- und Freizeitzentrum Südstadt, Maria Enzersdorf; Attendance: 800; Referees: Vujačić, Kažanegra (MNE)

9 March 2016; 18:00	Bulgaria	20–33	Austria	Orlovetz Hall, Gabrovo; Attendance: 400; Referees: Scevola, Alperan (ITA)
9 March 2016; 18:00	Agova, Pavlova 5	(10–13)	Scheffknecht 8	Orlovetz Hall, Gabrovo; Attendance: 400; Referees: Scevola, Alperan (ITA)
9 March 2016; 18:00	3× (yellow card) 2× (suspension)	Report	3× (yellow card) 3× (suspension)	Orlovetz Hall, Gabrovo; Attendance: 400; Referees: Scevola, Alperan (ITA)

9 March 2016; 19:00	Netherlands	31–21	Spain	Topsportcentrum, Almere; Attendance: 3,000; Referees: Horváth, Marton (HUN)
9 March 2016; 19:00	Snelder 7	(13–10)	Pena 9	Topsportcentrum, Almere; Attendance: 3,000; Referees: Horváth, Marton (HUN)
9 March 2016; 19:00	3× (yellow card) 3× (suspension)	Report	2× (yellow card) 4× (suspension)	Topsportcentrum, Almere; Attendance: 3,000; Referees: Horváth, Marton (HUN)

12 March 2016; 13:00	Spain	32–29	Netherlands	Palacio de los Deportes de León, León; Attendance: 3,000; Referees: Christiansen, Hansen (DEN)
12 March 2016; 13:00	Cabral Barbosa 10	(20–11)	Broch 7	Palacio de los Deportes de León, León; Attendance: 3,000; Referees: Christiansen, Hansen (DEN)
12 March 2016; 13:00	3× (yellow card) 4× (suspension)	Report	3× (yellow card) 7× (suspension) 1× (red card)	Palacio de los Deportes de León, León; Attendance: 3,000; Referees: Christiansen, Hansen (DEN)

12 March 2016; 20:25	Austria	39–27	Bulgaria	Handball-Arena Rieden Vorkloster, Bregenz; Attendance: 1,400; Referees: Katsikis, Michailidis (GRE)
12 March 2016; 20:25	Scheffknecht 8	(19–12)	Sarandeva 9	Handball-Arena Rieden Vorkloster, Bregenz; Attendance: 1,400; Referees: Katsikis, Michailidis (GRE)
12 March 2016; 20:25	3× (yellow card) 4× (suspension)	Report	1× (yellow card) 5× (suspension)	Handball-Arena Rieden Vorkloster, Bregenz; Attendance: 1,400; Referees: Katsikis, Michailidis (GRE)

1 June 2016; 18:00	Bulgaria	16–45	Netherlands	Orlovetz Hall, Gabrovo; Attendance: 250; Referees: Aghakishi, Aghakishi (AZE)
1 June 2016; 18:00	Bogdanova 6	(8–19)	Luciano 8	Orlovetz Hall, Gabrovo; Attendance: 250; Referees: Aghakishi, Aghakishi (AZE)
1 June 2016; 18:00	3× (yellow card) 2× (suspension)	Report	3× (yellow card) 4× (suspension)	Orlovetz Hall, Gabrovo; Attendance: 250; Referees: Aghakishi, Aghakishi (AZE)

1 June 2016; 20:25	Austria	26–33	Spain	OlympiaWorld Innsbruck, Innsbruck; Attendance: 1,400; Referees: Gasmi, Gasmi (FRA)
1 June 2016; 20:25	Engel 9	(12–16)	Aguilar 8	OlympiaWorld Innsbruck, Innsbruck; Attendance: 1,400; Referees: Gasmi, Gasmi (FRA)
1 June 2016; 20:25	3× (yellow card) 5× (suspension) 1× (red card)	Report	3× (yellow card) 5× (suspension)	OlympiaWorld Innsbruck, Innsbruck; Attendance: 1,400; Referees: Gasmi, Gasmi (FRA)

4 June 2016; 16:00	Netherlands	35–22	Austria	Maaspoort Sports and Events, 's-Hertogenbosch; Attendance: 2,600; Referees: Ilieva, Karbeska (MKD)
4 June 2016; 16:00	Abbingh 9	(18–11)	Frey, Engel 6	Maaspoort Sports and Events, 's-Hertogenbosch; Attendance: 2,600; Referees: Ilieva, Karbeska (MKD)
4 June 2016; 16:00	3× (yellow card) 1× (suspension)	Report	3× (yellow card) 5× (suspension)	Maaspoort Sports and Events, 's-Hertogenbosch; Attendance: 2,600; Referees: Ilieva, Karbeska (MKD)

4 June 2016; 18:00	Spain	42–11	Bulgaria	Polideportivo Ciudad Jardin, Málaga; Attendance: 2,000; Referees: Sa, Sa (POR)
4 June 2016; 18:00	Mangué, Martínez 6	(22–7)	Sarandeva 3	Polideportivo Ciudad Jardin, Málaga; Attendance: 2,000; Referees: Sa, Sa (POR)
4 June 2016; 18:00	3× (yellow card) 2× (suspension)	Report	3× (yellow card) 2× (suspension)	Polideportivo Ciudad Jardin, Málaga; Attendance: 2,000; Referees: Sa, Sa (POR)

=== Group 4 ===
Pos	Team	Pld	W	D	L	GF	GA	GD	Pts	Qualification
1	Montenegro	6	5	0	1	147	129	+18	10	Final tournament
2	Croatia	6	4	0	2	173	137	+36	8	Final tournament
3	Slovenia	6	3	0	3	142	134	+8	6	Best third-ranked team qualify for final tournament
4	Macedonia	6	0	0	6	114	176	−62	0	

Source: Eurohandball
Rules for classification: 1) points; 2) head-to-head points; 3) head-to-head goal difference; 4) head-to-head number of goals scored; 5) goal difference.

7 October 2015; 19:00	Croatia	27–19	Slovenia	Školska sportska dvorana Umag, Umag; Attendance: 1,000; Referees: Opava, Válek (CZE)
7 October 2015; 19:00	Penezić 10	(14–11)	Mavsar 7	Školska sportska dvorana Umag, Umag; Attendance: 1,000; Referees: Opava, Válek (CZE)
7 October 2015; 19:00	3× (yellow card) 1× (suspension)	Report	1× (yellow card) 4× (suspension) 1× (red card)	Školska sportska dvorana Umag, Umag; Attendance: 1,000; Referees: Opava, Válek (CZE)

7 October 2015; 19:30	Montenegro	21–14	Macedonia	SC Topolica, Bar; Attendance: 2,200; Referees: Arntsen, Røen (NOR)
7 October 2015; 19:30	Bulatović 6	(12–8)	Gjeorgjievska 4	SC Topolica, Bar; Attendance: 2,200; Referees: Arntsen, Røen (NOR)
7 October 2015; 19:30	1× (yellow card) 2× (suspension)	Report	2× (yellow card) 2× (suspension)	SC Topolica, Bar; Attendance: 2,200; Referees: Arntsen, Røen (NOR)

10 October 2015; 20:15	Macedonia	22–36	Croatia	SRC Kale, Skopje; Attendance: 800; Referees: Vranes, Wenninger (AUT)
10 October 2015; 20:15	Ristovska 8	(11–15)	Penezić 9	SRC Kale, Skopje; Attendance: 800; Referees: Vranes, Wenninger (AUT)
10 October 2015; 20:15	3× (yellow card) 5× (suspension)	Report	3× (yellow card) 4× (suspension)	SRC Kale, Skopje; Attendance: 800; Referees: Vranes, Wenninger (AUT)

11 October 2015; 16:00	Slovenia	20–22	Montenegro	Športna dvorana Kodeljevo, Ljubljana; Attendance: 1,000; Referees: Năstase, Stancu (ROU)
11 October 2015; 16:00	Mavsar, Lazović 6	(11–11)	Bulatović 9	Športna dvorana Kodeljevo, Ljubljana; Attendance: 1,000; Referees: Năstase, Stancu (ROU)
11 October 2015; 16:00	2× (yellow card) 6× (suspension)	Report	2× (yellow card) 5× (suspension)	Športna dvorana Kodeljevo, Ljubljana; Attendance: 1,000; Referees: Năstase, Stancu (ROU)

10 March 2016; 17:30	Slovenia	35–17	Macedonia	Športna dvorana Ljudski Vrt, Maribor; Attendance: 1,500; Referees: Zendali, Riello (ITA)
10 March 2016; 17:30	Lazović 6	(18–8)	Keramichieva 5	Športna dvorana Ljudski Vrt, Maribor; Attendance: 1,500; Referees: Zendali, Riello (ITA)
10 March 2016; 17:30	3× (yellow card)	Report	2× (yellow card) 2× (suspension)	Športna dvorana Ljudski Vrt, Maribor; Attendance: 1,500; Referees: Zendali, Riello (ITA)

10 March 2016; 20:00	Croatia	23–22	Montenegro	Spaladium Arena, Split; Attendance: 4,500; Referees: Zotin, Volodkov (RUS)
10 March 2016; 20:00	Penezić 11	(13–13)	Raičević 10	Spaladium Arena, Split; Attendance: 4,500; Referees: Zotin, Volodkov (RUS)
10 March 2016; 20:00	3× (yellow card) 3× (suspension)	Report	3× (yellow card) 2× (suspension)	Spaladium Arena, Split; Attendance: 4,500; Referees: Zotin, Volodkov (RUS)

12 March 2016; 20:00	Macedonia	21–22	Slovenia	SRC Kale, Skopje; Attendance: 800; Referees: Bolic, Hurich (AUT)
12 March 2016; 20:00	Stojanovska 5	(10–11)	Mavsar 7	SRC Kale, Skopje; Attendance: 800; Referees: Bolic, Hurich (AUT)
12 March 2016; 20:00	2× (yellow card) 2× (suspension) 1× (red card)	Report	2× (yellow card) 4× (suspension)	SRC Kale, Skopje; Attendance: 800; Referees: Bolic, Hurich (AUT)

12 March 2016; 20:30	Montenegro	31–29	Croatia	SC Topolica, Bar; Attendance: 3,200; Referees: Jović, Arnautović (BIH)
12 March 2016; 20:30	Bulatović 8	(19–15)	Penezić 8	SC Topolica, Bar; Attendance: 3,200; Referees: Jović, Arnautović (BIH)
12 March 2016; 20:30	3× (yellow card) 2× (suspension)	Report	3× (yellow card) 4× (suspension)	SC Topolica, Bar; Attendance: 3,200; Referees: Jović, Arnautović (BIH)

1 June 2016; 18:00	Slovenia	24–23	Croatia	Golovec Hall, Celje; Attendance: 2,000; Referees: Horváth, Marton (HUN)
1 June 2016; 18:00	Gros, Irman 8	(9–11)	Bašić 8	Golovec Hall, Celje; Attendance: 2,000; Referees: Horváth, Marton (HUN)
1 June 2016; 18:00	3× (yellow card) 6× (suspension)	Report	3× (yellow card) 3× (suspension)	Golovec Hall, Celje; Attendance: 2,000; Referees: Horváth, Marton (HUN)

2 June 2016; 18:00	Macedonia	21–27	Montenegro	SRC Kale, Skopje; Attendance: 550; Referees: Sirbu, Suponicov (MDA)
2 June 2016; 18:00	Ristovska 6	(12–13)	Jauković 7	SRC Kale, Skopje; Attendance: 550; Referees: Sirbu, Suponicov (MDA)
2 June 2016; 18:00	3× (yellow card) 3× (suspension)	Report	3× (yellow card) 4× (suspension)	SRC Kale, Skopje; Attendance: 550; Referees: Sirbu, Suponicov (MDA)

5 June 2016; 18:00	Croatia	35–19	Macedonia	Centar Zamet, Rijeka; Attendance: 900; Referees: Blanck, Isen (SWE)
5 June 2016; 18:00	Penezić 7	(17–7)	four players 3	Centar Zamet, Rijeka; Attendance: 900; Referees: Blanck, Isen (SWE)
5 June 2016; 18:00	3× (yellow card) 3× (suspension)	Report	3× (yellow card) 1× (suspension)	Centar Zamet, Rijeka; Attendance: 900; Referees: Blanck, Isen (SWE)

5 June 2016; 20:00	Montenegro	24–22	Slovenia	Sporthall "Nikoljac", Bijelo Polje; Attendance: 2,000; Referees: Madsen, Mortensen (DEN)
5 June 2016; 20:00	Raičević 11	(13–11)	Lazović 8	Sporthall "Nikoljac", Bijelo Polje; Attendance: 2,000; Referees: Madsen, Mortensen (DEN)
5 June 2016; 20:00	3× (yellow card) 4× (suspension)	Report	3× (yellow card) 5× (suspension)	Sporthall "Nikoljac", Bijelo Polje; Attendance: 2,000; Referees: Madsen, Mortensen (DEN)

=== Group 5 ===
Pos	Team	Pld	W	D	L	GF	GA	GD	Pts	Qualification
1	Hungary	6	5	0	1	198	130	+68	10	Final tournament
2	Poland	6	5	0	1	163	121	+42	10	Final tournament
3	Slovakia	6	2	0	4	142	138	+4	4	Best third-ranked team qualify for final tournament
4	Finland	6	0	0	6	84	198	−114	0	

Source: Eurohandball
Rules for classification: 1) points; 2) head-to-head points; 3) head-to-head goal difference; 4) head-to-head number of goals scored; 5) goal difference.

7 October 2015; 20:00	Poland	29–12	Finland	Hala RCS, Lubin; Attendance: 3,400; Referees: Stenrand, Birch (DEN)
7 October 2015; 20:00	Kulwińska 6	(13–8)	Cainberg 5	Hala RCS, Lubin; Attendance: 3,400; Referees: Stenrand, Birch (DEN)
7 October 2015; 20:00	3× (yellow card) 1× (suspension)	Report	3× (yellow card) 2× (suspension)	Hala RCS, Lubin; Attendance: 3,400; Referees: Stenrand, Birch (DEN)

8 October 2015; 18:00	Hungary	32–19	Slovakia	OBO Aréna Dabas, Dabas; Attendance: 2,000; Referees: Marić, Mašić (SRB)
8 October 2015; 18:00	Mayer 5	(15–8)	Szarková 5	OBO Aréna Dabas, Dabas; Attendance: 2,000; Referees: Marić, Mašić (SRB)
8 October 2015; 18:00	3× (yellow card)	Report	2× (yellow card) 3× (suspension)	OBO Aréna Dabas, Dabas; Attendance: 2,000; Referees: Marić, Mašić (SRB)

10 October 2015; 18:00	Slovakia	21–23	Poland	Mestská športová hala, Šaľa; Attendance: 2,127; Referees: Alpaidze, Berezkina (RUS)
10 October 2015; 18:00	Školková 9	(11–14)	Niedźwiedź 5	Mestská športová hala, Šaľa; Attendance: 2,127; Referees: Alpaidze, Berezkina (RUS)
10 October 2015; 18:00	3× (yellow card) 1× (suspension)	Report	3× (yellow card) 3× (suspension)	Mestská športová hala, Šaľa; Attendance: 2,127; Referees: Alpaidze, Berezkina (RUS)

11 October 2015; 14:00	Finland	25–38	Hungary	Sisu Arena, Karis; Attendance: 500; Referees: Praštalo, Todorović (BIH)
11 October 2015; 14:00	Degerman 7	(13–16)	Szucsánszki 9	Sisu Arena, Karis; Attendance: 500; Referees: Praštalo, Todorović (BIH)
11 October 2015; 14:00	3× (yellow card) 1× (suspension)	Report	3× (yellow card) 4× (suspension)	Sisu Arena, Karis; Attendance: 500; Referees: Praštalo, Todorović (BIH)

9 March 2016; 18:30	Finland	15–29	Slovakia	Energia Areena, Vantaa; Attendance: 700; Referees: Bennani, Bennani (SWE)
9 March 2016; 18:30	three players 3	(8–15)	Trehubová 6	Energia Areena, Vantaa; Attendance: 700; Referees: Bennani, Bennani (SWE)
9 March 2016; 18:30	2× (yellow card) 4× (suspension)	Report	3× (yellow card) 6× (suspension)	Energia Areena, Vantaa; Attendance: 700; Referees: Bennani, Bennani (SWE)

9 March 2016; 20:30	Poland	24–27	Hungary	Hala Widowiskowo-Sportowa, Koszalin; Attendance: 3,000; Referees: Vujačić, Kažanegra (MNE)
9 March 2016; 20:30	Siódmiak 5	(13–13)	Szöllősi-Zácsik 6	Hala Widowiskowo-Sportowa, Koszalin; Attendance: 3,000; Referees: Vujačić, Kažanegra (MNE)
9 March 2016; 20:30	3× (yellow card) 2× (suspension)	Report	2× (yellow card) 3× (suspension)	Hala Widowiskowo-Sportowa, Koszalin; Attendance: 3,000; Referees: Vujačić, Kažanegra (MNE)

12 March 2016; 16:00	Slovakia	25–8	Finland	City Sport Hall, Partizánske; Attendance: 1,200; Referees: Ilieva, Karbeska (MKD)
12 March 2016; 16:00	Školková 7	(11–3)	Hilli, Näräkkä 2	City Sport Hall, Partizánske; Attendance: 1,200; Referees: Ilieva, Karbeska (MKD)
12 March 2016; 16:00	3× (yellow card) 4× (suspension)	Report	3× (yellow card) 1× (suspension)	City Sport Hall, Partizánske; Attendance: 1,200; Referees: Ilieva, Karbeska (MKD)

13 March 2016; 18:30	Hungary	25–26	Poland	Érd Aréna, Érd; Attendance: 2,200; Referees: Kijauskaitė, Žalienė (LTU)
13 March 2016; 18:30	Triscsuk 7	(16–17)	Kobylińska 7	Érd Aréna, Érd; Attendance: 2,200; Referees: Kijauskaitė, Žalienė (LTU)
13 March 2016; 18:30	3× (yellow card) 3× (suspension)	Report	3× (yellow card) 3× (suspension)	Érd Aréna, Érd; Attendance: 2,200; Referees: Kijauskaitė, Žalienė (LTU)

1 June 2016; 18:00	Slovakia	23–32	Hungary	Chemkostav Arena, Michalovce; Attendance: 1,600; Referees: Năstase, Stancu (ROU)
1 June 2016; 18:00	Školková 6	(12–15)	Triscsuk 6	Chemkostav Arena, Michalovce; Attendance: 1,600; Referees: Năstase, Stancu (ROU)
1 June 2016; 18:00	3× (yellow card) 2× (suspension)	Report	2× (yellow card) 4× (suspension)	Chemkostav Arena, Michalovce; Attendance: 1,600; Referees: Năstase, Stancu (ROU)

1 June 2016; 18:30	Finland	11–33	Poland	Energia Areena, Vantaa; Attendance: 400; Referees: Guðjónsson, Samuelsen
1 June 2016; 18:30	four players 2	(3–17)	Kudłacz-Gloc 9	Energia Areena, Vantaa; Attendance: 400; Referees: Guðjónsson, Samuelsen
1 June 2016; 18:30	3× (yellow card) 1× (suspension)	Report	3× (yellow card) 1× (suspension)	Energia Areena, Vantaa; Attendance: 400; Referees: Guðjónsson, Samuelsen

4 June 2016; 20:00	Poland	28–25	Slovakia	Orlen Arena, Płock; Attendance: 1,700; Referees: Sager, Styger (SUI)
4 June 2016; 20:00	Kudłacz-Gloc 8	(15–13)	Kučerová 5	Orlen Arena, Płock; Attendance: 1,700; Referees: Sager, Styger (SUI)
4 June 2016; 20:00	2× (yellow card)	Report	3× (yellow card) 2× (suspension)	Orlen Arena, Płock; Attendance: 1,700; Referees: Sager, Styger (SUI)

5 June 2016; 18:00	Hungary	44–13	Finland	Városi Sportcsarnok, Érd; Attendance: 1,500; Referees: Aliyev, Aghakishiyev (AZE)
5 June 2016; 18:00	Lukács 6	(21–5)	Cainberg 5	Városi Sportcsarnok, Érd; Attendance: 1,500; Referees: Aliyev, Aghakishiyev (AZE)
5 June 2016; 18:00	3× (yellow card) 4× (suspension)	Report	3× (yellow card) 2× (suspension)	Városi Sportcsarnok, Érd; Attendance: 1,500; Referees: Aliyev, Aghakishiyev (AZE)

=== Group 6 ===
Pos	Team	Pld	W	D	L	GF	GA	GD	Pts	Qualification
1	Russia	6	6	0	0	200	145	+55	12	Final tournament
2	Denmark	6	4	0	2	162	135	+27	8	Final tournament
3	Turkey	6	1	0	5	157	190	−33	2	Best third-ranked team qualify for final tournament
4	Portugal	6	1	0	5	134	183	−49	2	

Source: Eurohandball
Rules for classification: 1) points; 2) head-to-head points; 3) head-to-head goal difference; 4) head-to-head number of goals scored; 5) goal difference.

8 October 2015; 19:00	Russia	39–19	Portugal	Palace of Sport "Rostov Don", Rostov-on-Don; Attendance: 3,500; Referees: Tzaferopoulos, Bethmann (GRE)
8 October 2015; 19:00	Davydenko 7	(20–10)	Tavares 5	Palace of Sport "Rostov Don", Rostov-on-Don; Attendance: 3,500; Referees: Tzaferopoulos, Bethmann (GRE)
8 October 2015; 19:00	3× (yellow card) 4× (suspension)	Report	3× (yellow card) 4× (suspension)	Palace of Sport "Rostov Don", Rostov-on-Don; Attendance: 3,500; Referees: Tzaferopoulos, Bethmann (GRE)

8 October 2015; 20:15	Denmark	28–19	Turkey	Ceres Arena, Aarhus; Attendance: 4,086; Referees: Nabokau, Kulik (BLR)
8 October 2015; 20:15	Jørgensen, Nørgaard 6	(16–10)	Şahin 9	Ceres Arena, Aarhus; Attendance: 4,086; Referees: Nabokau, Kulik (BLR)
8 October 2015; 20:15	3× (yellow card) 6× (suspension)	Report	3× (yellow card) 5× (suspension)	Ceres Arena, Aarhus; Attendance: 4,086; Referees: Nabokau, Kulik (BLR)

11 October 2015; 16:10	Portugal	21–26	Denmark	Multiusos de Pinhel, Pinhel; Attendance: 1,700; Referees: Bonaventura, Bonaventura (FRA)
11 October 2015; 16:10	Emidio Rodrigues 5	(10–14)	Fisker, Kristiansen 4	Multiusos de Pinhel, Pinhel; Attendance: 1,700; Referees: Bonaventura, Bonaventura (FRA)
11 October 2015; 16:10	3× (yellow card) 6× (suspension)	Report	3× (yellow card) 4× (suspension)	Multiusos de Pinhel, Pinhel; Attendance: 1,700; Referees: Bonaventura, Bonaventura (FRA)

11 October 2015; 17:00	Turkey	30–44	Russia	THF Sport Hall, Ankara; Attendance: 800; Referees: Pandžić, Šatordžija (BIH)
11 October 2015; 17:00	Şahin 8	(14–25)	Ilina 9	THF Sport Hall, Ankara; Attendance: 800; Referees: Pandžić, Šatordžija (BIH)
11 October 2015; 17:00	3× (yellow card) 9× (suspension) 1× (red card)	Report	3× (yellow card) 6× (suspension) 1× (red card)	THF Sport Hall, Ankara; Attendance: 800; Referees: Pandžić, Šatordžija (BIH)

9 March 2016; 19:00	Russia	31–27	Denmark	Sportcomplex "Zvezdniy", Astrakhan; Attendance: 5,000; Referees: Opava, Válek (CZE)
9 March 2016; 19:00	Vyakhireva 9	(16–12)	Jørgensen 6	Sportcomplex "Zvezdniy", Astrakhan; Attendance: 5,000; Referees: Opava, Válek (CZE)
9 March 2016; 19:00	3× (yellow card) 4× (suspension) 1× (red card)	Report	3× (yellow card) 1× (suspension)	Sportcomplex "Zvezdniy", Astrakhan; Attendance: 5,000; Referees: Opava, Válek (CZE)

10 March 2016; 20:00	Portugal	24–23	Turkey	Pavilhão Municipal de São Pedro do Sul, São Pedro do Sul; Attendance: 1,025; Referees: Di Domenico, Fornasier (ITA)
10 March 2016; 20:00	Rodrigues, Correia 4	(11–11)	Demirçelen 7	Pavilhão Municipal de São Pedro do Sul, São Pedro do Sul; Attendance: 1,025; Referees: Di Domenico, Fornasier (ITA)
10 March 2016; 20:00	3× (yellow card) 1× (suspension)	Report	3× (yellow card) 1× (suspension)	Pavilhão Municipal de São Pedro do Sul, São Pedro do Sul; Attendance: 1,025; Referees: Di Domenico, Fornasier (ITA)

12 March 2016; 17:10	Denmark	22–24	Russia	Næstved Arena, Næstved; Attendance: 3,011; Referees: Kékes, Kékes (HUN)
12 March 2016; 17:10	Hansen 6	(8–14)	Dmitrieva, Vyakhireva 4	Næstved Arena, Næstved; Attendance: 3,011; Referees: Kékes, Kékes (HUN)
12 March 2016; 17:10	3× (yellow card) 4× (suspension)	Report	2× (yellow card) 5× (suspension)	Næstved Arena, Næstved; Attendance: 3,011; Referees: Kékes, Kékes (HUN)

13 March 2016; 16:00	Turkey	37–31	Portugal	THF Sport Hall, Ankara; Attendance: 550; Referees: Năstase, Stancu (ROU)
13 March 2016; 16:00	Yılmaz 11	(17–18)	Oliveira 7	THF Sport Hall, Ankara; Attendance: 550; Referees: Năstase, Stancu (ROU)
13 March 2016; 16:00	3× (yellow card) 3× (suspension)	Report	3× (yellow card) 2× (suspension)	THF Sport Hall, Ankara; Attendance: 550; Referees: Năstase, Stancu (ROU)

1 June 2016; 20:00	Turkey	23–26	Denmark	Rize Sports Hall, Rize; Attendance: 1,000; Referees: Scevola, Alperan (ITA)
1 June 2016; 20:00	İskenderoğlu 8	(11–12)	Jørgensen 6	Rize Sports Hall, Rize; Attendance: 1,000; Referees: Scevola, Alperan (ITA)
1 June 2016; 20:00	3× (yellow card) 2× (suspension)	Report	3× (yellow card) 4× (suspension)	Rize Sports Hall, Rize; Attendance: 1,000; Referees: Scevola, Alperan (ITA)

2 June 2016; 19:45	Portugal	22–25	Russia	PavilhaoMunicipal das Travessas, São João da Madeira; Attendance: 1,000; Referees: Brkic, Jusufhodzic (AUT)
2 June 2016; 19:45	Oliveira 5	(6–13)	Skorobogatchenko 6	PavilhaoMunicipal das Travessas, São João da Madeira; Attendance: 1,000; Referees: Brkic, Jusufhodzic (AUT)
2 June 2016; 19:45	3× (yellow card) 4× (suspension)	Report	3× (yellow card) 4× (suspension)	PavilhaoMunicipal das Travessas, São João da Madeira; Attendance: 1,000; Referees: Brkic, Jusufhodzic (AUT)

5 June 2016; 16:00	Russia	37–25	Turkey	Palace of Sports "Olimp" Krasnodar, Krasnodar; Attendance: 2,200; Referees: Argyridis, Mouttas (CYP)
5 June 2016; 16:00	Bobrovnikova, Ilina 6	(21–14)	Yılmaz 7	Palace of Sports "Olimp" Krasnodar, Krasnodar; Attendance: 2,200; Referees: Argyridis, Mouttas (CYP)
5 June 2016; 16:00	3× (yellow card) 3× (suspension)	Report	3× (yellow card) 4× (suspension)	Palace of Sports "Olimp" Krasnodar, Krasnodar; Attendance: 2,200; Referees: Argyridis, Mouttas (CYP)

5 June 2016; 17:10	Denmark	33–17	Portugal	Ceres Arena, Aarhus; Attendance: 2,834; Referees: Praštalo, Todorović (BIH)
5 June 2016; 17:10	Okkels 7	(11–7)	Correia 4	Ceres Arena, Aarhus; Attendance: 2,834; Referees: Praštalo, Todorović (BIH)
5 June 2016; 17:10	1× (yellow card) 2× (suspension)	Report	3× (yellow card) 4× (suspension)	Ceres Arena, Aarhus; Attendance: 2,834; Referees: Praštalo, Todorović (BIH)

=== Group 7 ===
Pos	Team	Pld	W	D	L	GF	GA	GD	Pts	Qualification
1	France	6	6	0	0	162	113	+49	12	Final tournament
2	Germany	6	4	0	2	149	128	+21	8	Final tournament
3	Iceland	6	1	0	5	112	153	−41	2	Best third-ranked team qualify for final tournament
4	Switzerland	6	1	0	5	122	151	−29	2	

Source: Eurohandball
Rules for classification: 1) points; 2) head-to-head points; 3) head-to-head goal difference; 4) head-to-head number of goals scored; 5) goal difference.

7 October 2015; 19:30	Germany	29–18	Switzerland	HUK-Coburg arena, Coburg; Attendance: 2,024; Referees: Panayides, Andreou (CYP)
7 October 2015; 19:30	Naidzinavicius 6	(13–10)	Scherer 6	HUK-Coburg arena, Coburg; Attendance: 2,024; Referees: Panayides, Andreou (CYP)
7 October 2015; 19:30	3× (yellow card) 2× (suspension)	Report	3× (yellow card) 3× (suspension)	HUK-Coburg arena, Coburg; Attendance: 2,024; Referees: Panayides, Andreou (CYP)

8 October 2015; 19:00	France	27–17	Iceland	Azur Arena, Antibes; Attendance: 2,800; Referees: Álvarez, Bustamente (ESP)
8 October 2015; 19:00	three players 4	(11–8)	four players 3	Azur Arena, Antibes; Attendance: 2,800; Referees: Álvarez, Bustamente (ESP)
8 October 2015; 19:00	2× (yellow card) 3× (suspension)	Report	3× (yellow card) 4× (suspension)	Azur Arena, Antibes; Attendance: 2,800; Referees: Álvarez, Bustamente (ESP)

11 October 2015; 15:00	Switzerland	19–28	France	Sporthalle Birsfelden, Birsfelden; Attendance: 950; Referees: Cindrić, Gonzurek (CRO)
11 October 2015; 15:00	Scherer 7	(10–15)	Houette 7	Sporthalle Birsfelden, Birsfelden; Attendance: 950; Referees: Cindrić, Gonzurek (CRO)
11 October 2015; 15:00	3× (yellow card) 3× (suspension)	Report	3× (yellow card) 6× (suspension)	Sporthalle Birsfelden, Birsfelden; Attendance: 950; Referees: Cindrić, Gonzurek (CRO)

11 October 2015; 16:00	Iceland	17–22	Germany	Hlíðarendi, Reykjavík; Attendance: 960; Referees: Christiansen, Hansen (DEN)
11 October 2015; 16:00	Knútsdóttir 4	(11–12)	S. Müller 7	Hlíðarendi, Reykjavík; Attendance: 960; Referees: Christiansen, Hansen (DEN)
11 October 2015; 16:00	2× (yellow card) 4× (suspension)	Report	2× (yellow card) 1× (suspension)	Hlíðarendi, Reykjavík; Attendance: 960; Referees: Christiansen, Hansen (DEN)

9 March 2016; 19:30	Germany	21–24	France	EgeTrans Arena, Bietigheim-Bissingen; Attendance: 3,375; Referees: Alpaidze, Berezkina (RUS)
9 March 2016; 19:30	S. Müller 7	(10–9)	Pineau 9	EgeTrans Arena, Bietigheim-Bissingen; Attendance: 3,375; Referees: Alpaidze, Berezkina (RUS)
9 March 2016; 19:30	3× (yellow card) 4× (suspension)	Report	2× (yellow card) 1× (suspension)	EgeTrans Arena, Bietigheim-Bissingen; Attendance: 3,375; Referees: Alpaidze, Berezkina (RUS)

10 March 2016; 20:00	Switzerland	22–21	Iceland	GoEasy Arena, Siggenthal; Attendance: 1,420; Referees: Antić, Jakovljević (SRB)
10 March 2016; 20:00	Scherer 5	(9–10)	Knútsdóttir 6	GoEasy Arena, Siggenthal; Attendance: 1,420; Referees: Antić, Jakovljević (SRB)
10 March 2016; 20:00	2× (yellow card) 4× (suspension)	Report	3× (yellow card) 4× (suspension)	GoEasy Arena, Siggenthal; Attendance: 1,420; Referees: Antić, Jakovljević (SRB)

12 March 2016; 20:00	France	25–19	Germany	Le Parnasse, Nîmes; Attendance: 3,500; Referees: Brehmer, Skowronek (POL)
12 March 2016; 20:00	Pineau 8	(13–9)	three players 4	Le Parnasse, Nîmes; Attendance: 3,500; Referees: Brehmer, Skowronek (POL)
12 March 2016; 20:00	3× (yellow card) 2× (suspension)	Report	3× (yellow card) 4× (suspension)	Le Parnasse, Nîmes; Attendance: 3,500; Referees: Brehmer, Skowronek (POL)

13 March 2016; 16:30	Iceland	20–19	Switzerland	Íþróttamiðstöð Hauka, Hafnarfjörður; Attendance: 485; Referees: Florescu, Stoia (ROU)
13 March 2016; 16:30	Pekarskyte, Sturludóttir 3	(10–9)	Frey 5	Íþróttamiðstöð Hauka, Hafnarfjörður; Attendance: 485; Referees: Florescu, Stoia (ROU)
13 March 2016; 16:30	3× (yellow card) 2× (suspension)	Report	3× (yellow card) 4× (suspension)	Íþróttamiðstöð Hauka, Hafnarfjörður; Attendance: 485; Referees: Florescu, Stoia (ROU)

1 June 2016; 19:00	Switzerland	23–25	Germany	Sporthalle Kreuzbleiche, St. Gallen; Attendance: 1,479; Referees: Rakytina, Tkachuk (UKR)
1 June 2016; 19:00	Hodel 7	(14–14)	Huber 8	Sporthalle Kreuzbleiche, St. Gallen; Attendance: 1,479; Referees: Rakytina, Tkachuk (UKR)
1 June 2016; 19:00	3× (yellow card) 6× (suspension)	Report	3× (yellow card) 1× (suspension)	Sporthalle Kreuzbleiche, St. Gallen; Attendance: 1,479; Referees: Rakytina, Tkachuk (UKR)

1 June 2016; 20:00	Iceland	16–30	France	Valshöllin, Reykjavík; Attendance: 450; Referees: Jaškins, Žabko (LAT)
1 June 2016; 20:00	Knútsdóttir 7	(7–15)	Dembélé 6	Valshöllin, Reykjavík; Attendance: 450; Referees: Jaškins, Žabko (LAT)
1 June 2016; 20:00	2× (yellow card) 2× (suspension)	Report	2× (yellow card)	Valshöllin, Reykjavík; Attendance: 450; Referees: Jaškins, Žabko (LAT)

4 June 2016; 20:00	France	28–21	Switzerland	Beauvais; Attendance: 2,000; Referees: Di Domenico, Fornasier (ITA)
4 June 2016; 20:00	Lacrabère 6	(15–8)	Scherer 6	Beauvais; Attendance: 2,000; Referees: Di Domenico, Fornasier (ITA)
4 June 2016; 20:00	2× (yellow card) 3× (suspension)	Report	3× (yellow card) 4× (suspension)	Beauvais; Attendance: 2,000; Referees: Di Domenico, Fornasier (ITA)

5 June 2016; 17:00	Germany	33–21	Iceland	Porsche-Arena, Stuttgart; Attendance: 2,308; Referees: Thomassen, Schmack (BEL)
5 June 2016; 17:00	Lang 7	(15–9)	Kjærnested, Knútsdóttir 4	Porsche-Arena, Stuttgart; Attendance: 2,308; Referees: Thomassen, Schmack (BEL)
5 June 2016; 17:00	2× (yellow card) 1× (suspension)	Report	1× (suspension)	Porsche-Arena, Stuttgart; Attendance: 2,308; Referees: Thomassen, Schmack (BEL)

=== Ranking of third-placed teams ===
To determine the best third-placed teams from the qualifying group stage which qualified directly for the final tournament, only the results against the first, and second-placed teams in their group were taken into account, while results against the fourth-placed team were not included. As a result, four matches played by each third-placed team counted for the purposes of determining the ranking.

Pos	Grp	Team	Pld	W	D	L	GF	GA	GD	Pts	Qualification
1	4	Slovenia	4	1	0	3	85	96	−11	2	Final tournament
2	1	Belarus	4	1	0	3	92	112	−20	2	
3	2	Ukraine	4	0	0	4	101	120	−19	0	
4	5	Slovakia	4	0	0	4	88	115	−27	0	
5	3	Austria	4	0	0	4	88	124	−36	0	
6	6	Turkey	4	0	0	4	97	135	−38	0	
7	7	Iceland	4	0	0	4	71	112	−41	0	

Source: Eurohandball
Rules for classification: 1) points; 2) goal difference; 3) goals scored.
