= Lea Schüpbach =

Swiss handball player

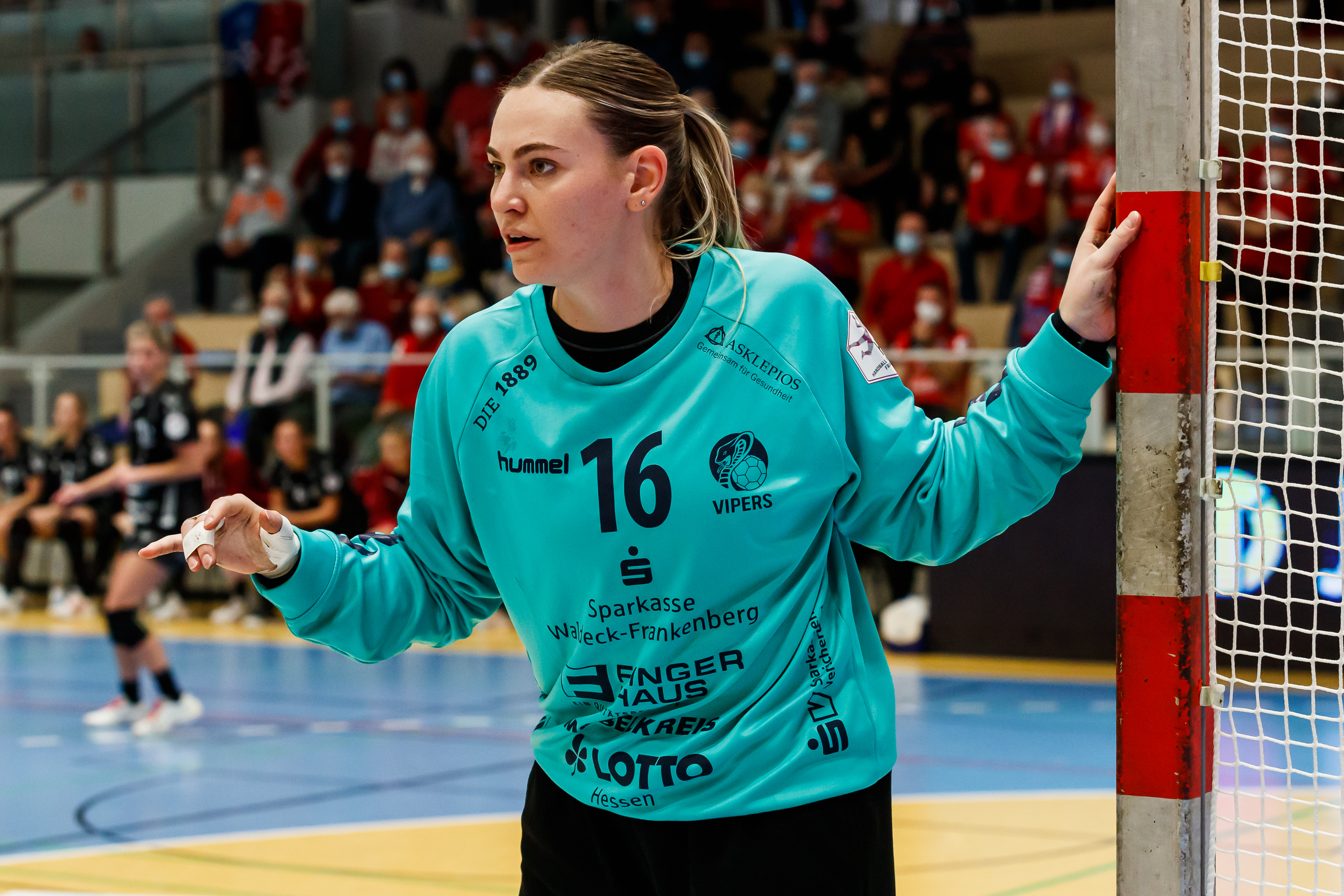

Personal information
- Full name: Lea Schüpbach
- Nationality: Swiss
- Born: 10 September 1997 (age 29) Winterthur, Switzerland
- Height: 1.78 m (5 ft 10 in)

Sport
- Sport: Handball
- Position: Goalkeeper
- Current club: TuS Metzingen
- Number: 16

Youth career
- Years: Team
- 2010-2013: Yellow Winterthur

Senior clubs
- Years: Team
- 2013-2017: Yellow Winterthur
- 2017-2019: Spono Eagles
- 2019-2020: Paris 92
- 2020-2022: HSG Bad Wildungen
- 2022-: TuS Metzingen
National team
Years	Team	Apps	(Gls)
2018-	Switzerland	60	(0)
- Updated on 14 November 2025

Lea Schüpbach (born 10 September 1997) is a Swiss handballer who plays for TuS Metzingen and the Switzerland women's national team.

== Achievements ==
- SPAR Premium League:
  - Winner: 2016, 2018
- Swiss Cup:
  - Winner: 2013, 2018, 2019
