= Swiss Handball Association =

Professional handball association in Switzerland

Swiss Handball Association German: Schweizerischer Handball-Verband SHV
- IOC nation: Switzerland (SUI)
- Sport: Handball
- Other sports: Beach handball; Wheelchair handball
- Official website: www.handball.ch

HISTORY
- Preceding organisations: Schweizerischen Handball-Ausschuss (HBA) (1939 – 1974)
- Year of formation: 11 March 1939; 87 years ago (as HBA); 7 December 1974; 51 years ago (as SHV)

DEMOGRAPHICS
- Number of affiliated Handball clubs: 229 (as of 2017)

AFFILIATIONS
- International federation: International Handball Federation (IHF)
- IHF member since: 1946
- Continental association: European Handball Federation
- National Olympic Committee: Swiss Olympic Association

GOVERNING BODY
- President: Mr. Ulrich Rubeli (Switzerland)

HEADQUARTERS
- Address: Tannwaldstrasse 2 4601 Olten
- Country: Switzerland
- Secretary General: Mr. Jürgen Krucker (Switzerland)

The Swiss Handball Association (SHV) (German: Schweizerischer Handball-Verband) is the governing body of handball and beach handball in Switzerland. Founded in 1974, SHV is affiliated to the International Handball Federation and European Handball Federation. SHV is also affiliated to the Swiss Olympic Association. It is based in Olten.

== SHV Competitions ==
- Swiss Handball League
- Spar Premium League

== National teams ==
- Switzerland men's national handball team
- Switzerland men's national junior handball team
- Switzerland men's national youth handball team
- Switzerland women's national handball team
- Switzerland women's national junior handball team
- Switzerland women's national youth handball team

== Competitions Hosted ==
=== International ===
- 1986 World Men's Handball Championship
- 2001 Men's Junior World Handball Championship

=== Continental ===
- 2006 European Men's Handball Championship

== Affiliated Clubs ==
- Kadetten Schaffhausen
- LC Brühl Handball
- LK Zug
- Pfadi Winterthur
- RTV 1879 Basel
- Spono Eagles
- TSV St. Otmar St. Gallen
- Wacker Thun
