= Sladana Dokovic =

Swiss handball player

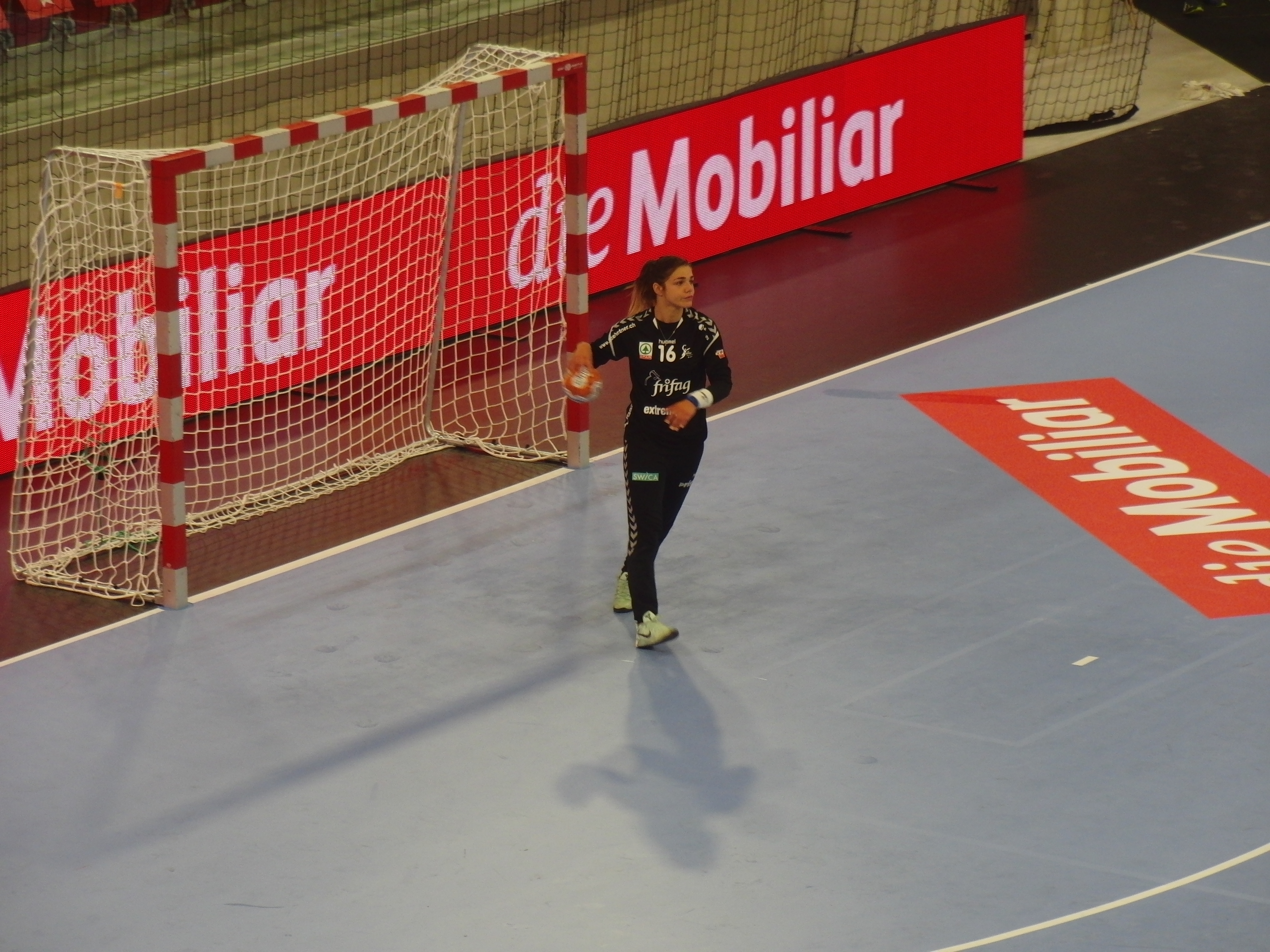

Personal information
- Full name: Sladana Dokovic
- Nationality: Swiss
- Born: 22 July 1995 (age 31) St. Gallen, Switzerland
- Height: 1.76 m (5 ft 9 in)

Sport
- Sport: Handball
- Position: Goalkeeper
- Current club: LC Brühl Handball
- Number: 16

Senior clubs
- Years: Team
- 2012–: LC Brühl Handball
National team
Years	Team	Apps	(Gls)
2016–	Switzerland	36	(0)

Sladana Dokovic (born 22 July 1995) is a Swiss female handballer for LC Brühl Handball in the Spar Premium League and the Swiss national team.

Dokovic made her official debut on the Swiss national team on 1 June 2016, against Germany. She represented Switzerland for the first time at the 2022 European Women's Handball Championship in Slovenia, Montenegro and North Macedonia.

== Achievements ==
- SPAR Premium League
  - Winner: 2017, 2019
- Swiss Cup
  - Winner: 2016, 2017
- SuperCupsieger
  - Winner: 2017, 2019
