= Dimitra Hess =

Swiss handball player

Personal information
- Full name: Dimitra Hess
- Nationality: Swiss
- Born: 14 August 2000 (age 26) Radelfingen, Switzerland
- Height: 1.60 m (5 ft 3 in)

Sport
- Sport: Handball
- Position: Left wing
- Current club: LC Brühl Handball
- Number: 24

Senior clubs
- Years: Team
- 2018–2021: LK Zug
- 2021–: LC Brühl Handball
National team
Years	Team	Apps	(Gls)
2021–	Switzerland	25	(33)

Dimitra Hess (born 14 August 2000) is a Swiss female handballer for LC Brühl Handball in the Spar Premium League and the Swiss national team.

She made her official debut on the Swiss national team on 22 March 2019, against Spain. She represented Switzerland for the first time at the 2022 European Women's Handball Championship in Slovenia, Montenegro and North Macedonia.

== Achievements ==
- SPAR Premium League
  - Bronze Medalist: 2022
- Swiss SuperCup
  - Winner: 2021
