= Manuela Brütsch =

Swiss handball player

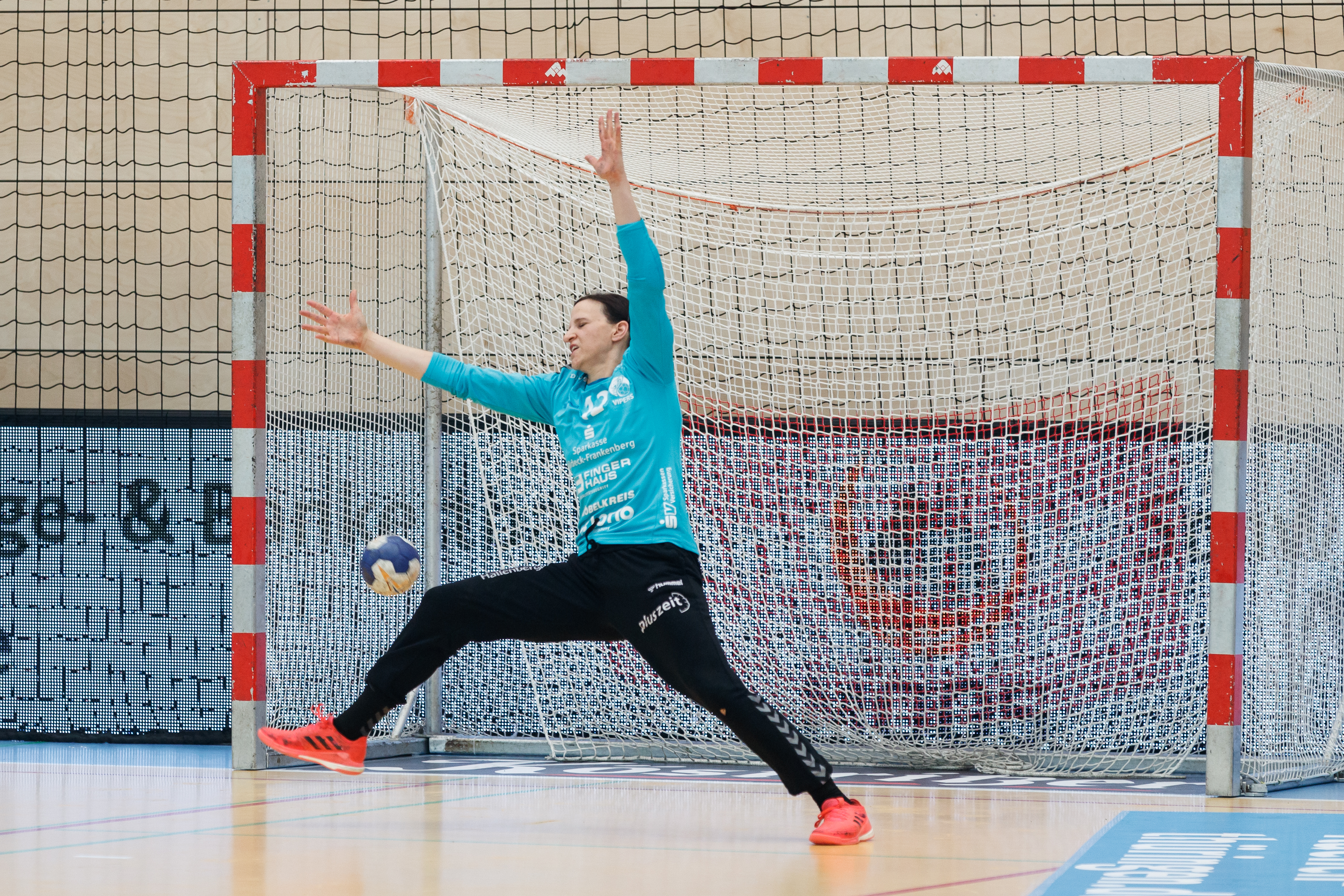

Personal information
- Full name: Manuela Brütsch
- Nationality: Swiss
- Born: 14 February 1984 (age 42) Dielsdorf, Switzerland
- Height: 1.74 m (5 ft 9 in)

Sport
- Sport: Handball
- Position: Goalkeeper
- Current club: LC Brühl Handball
- Number: 12

Senior clubs
- Years: Team
- 2001–2006: TV Uster
- 2006–2011: LC Brühl Handball
- 2011–2012: HSG Bensheim/Auerbach
- 2012–2024: HSG Bad Wildungen
- 2024-: LC Brühl Handball
National team
Years	Team	Apps	(Gls)
2004–	Switzerland	180	(0)
- Updated on 17 December 2014

Manuela Brütsch (born 14 February 1984) is a Swiss female handballer for LC Brühl Handball in Switzerland and the Swiss national team. She has previously played for HSG Bad Wildungen in the Frauen Handball-Bundesliga.

Brütsch made her official debut on the Swiss national team on 27 November 2004, against Portugal. She represented Switzerland for the first time at the 2022 European Women's Handball Championship in Slovenia, Montenegro and North Macedonia.

== Achievements ==
- SPAR Premium League
  - Winner: 2007, 2008, 2009, 2011
- Swiss Cup
  - Winner: 2008, 2009, 2010
  - Finalist: 2011
