= Kerstin Kündig =

Austrian handball player (born 1993)

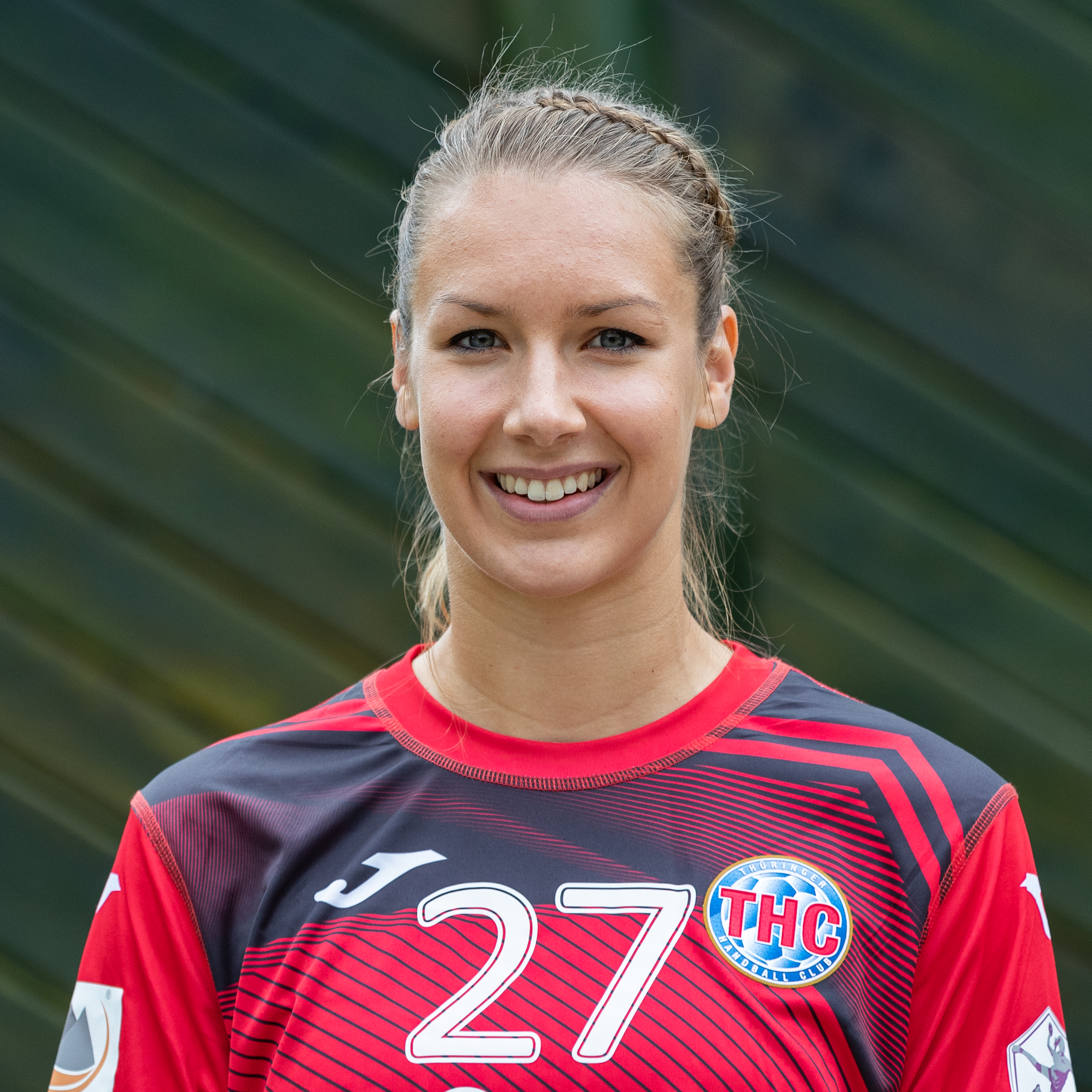
- Kündig in 2020

Personal information
- Full name: Kerstin Alexandra Kündig
- Born: 2 July 1993 (age 33) Zürich, Switzerland
- Height: 1.74 m (5 ft 9 in)

Sport
- Sport: Handball
- Position: Centre back
- Current club: Thüringer HC
- Number: 27

Senior clubs
- Years: Team
- 2010–2013: Yellow Winterthur
- 2013–2020: LC Brühl Handball
- 2020–2022: Thüringer HC
- 2022: Viborg HK
- 2022–2023: SG BBM Bietigheim
- 2023-: Thüringer HC
National team
Years	Team	Apps	(Gls)
2012–	Switzerland	91	(249)
- Updated on 15 August 2024

Kerstin Alexandra Kündig (born 2 July 1993) is a Swiss handballer who plays for Thüringer HC in Germany and the Switzerland women's national team.

== Achievements ==
- SPAR Premium League:
  - Winner: 2017, 2019
- Swiss Cup:
  - Winner: 2016, 2017
- Super Cup:
  - Winner: 2017, 2019
- Bundesliga:
  - Winner: 2023
