= Lisa Frey =

Swiss handball player

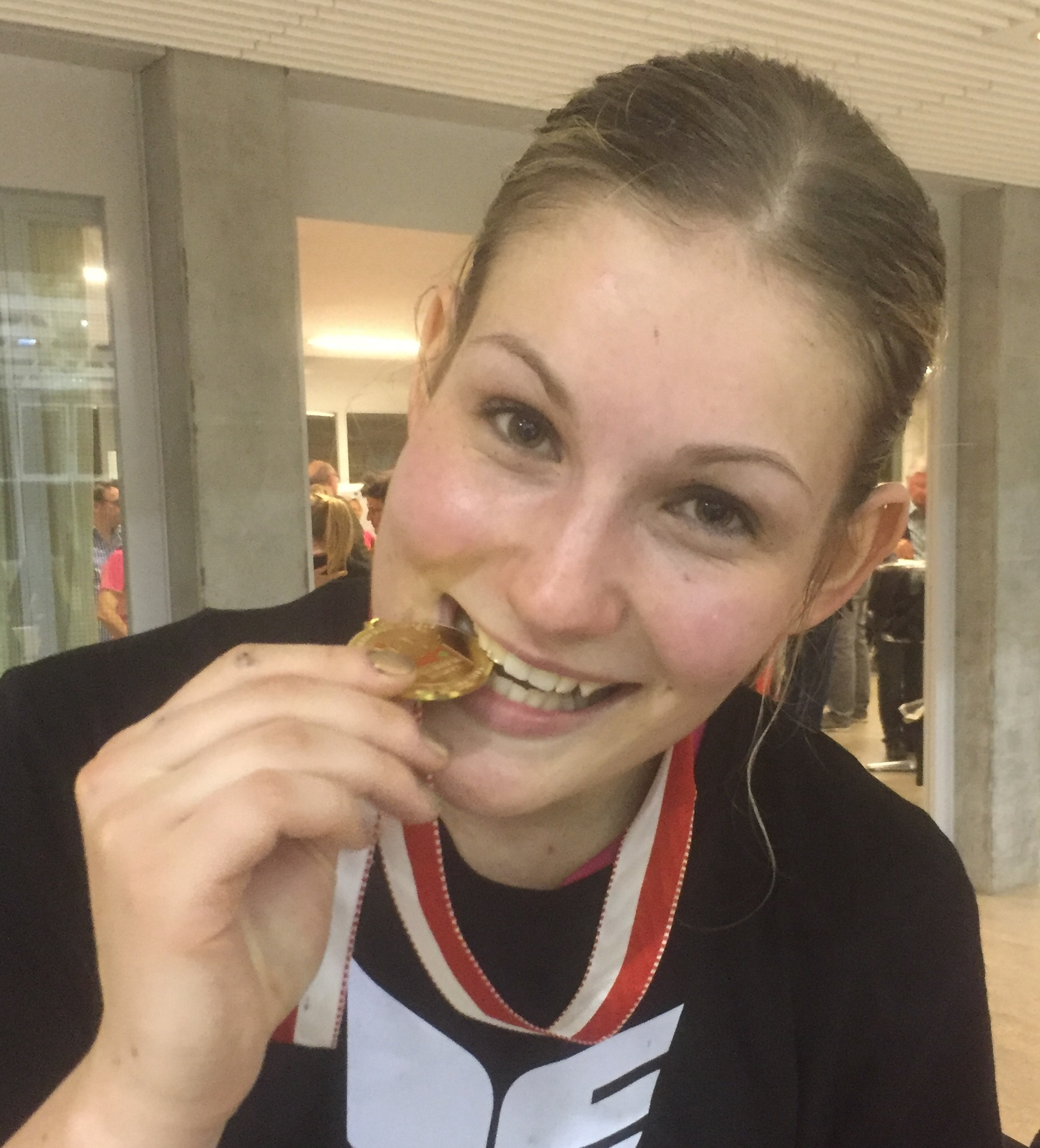
- Lisa Frey in 2016 as Swiss champion

Personal information
- Full name: Lisa Frey
- Nationality: Swiss
- Born: 16 February 1995 (age 31) Aarau, Switzerland
- Height: 1.76 m (5 ft 9 in)

Sport
- Sport: Handball
- Position: Centre back
- Current club: HSG Blomberg-Lippe
- Number: 8

Senior clubs
- Years: Team
- 2011–2012: TV Zofingen
- 2012–2018: Spono Eagles
- 2018–2020: Vendsyssel Håndbold
- 2020–2022: Frisch Auf Göppingen
- 2022–: HSG Blomberg-Lippe
National team
Years	Team	Apps	(Gls)
2012–	Switzerland	93	(142)
- Updated on 14 November 2024

Lisa Frey (born 16 February 1995) is a Swiss female handballer for HSG Blomberg-Lippe in the Frauen Handball-Bundesliga and the Swiss national team.

Frey made her official debut on the Swiss national team on 4 October 2012, against Austria. She represented Switzerland for the first time at the 2022 European Women's Handball Championship in Slovenia, Montenegro and North Macedonia.

== Achievements ==
- SPAR Premium League
  - Winner: 2016, 2018
- Swiss Cup
  - Winner: 2013, 2018
