= Malin Altherr =

Swiss handball player

Personal information
- Full name: Malin Altherr
- Nationality: Swiss
- Born: 14 February 2003 (age 23)
- Height: 1.78 m (5 ft 10 in)

Sport
- Sport: Handball
- Position: Right back
- Current club: LC Brühl Handball
- Number: 10

Youth career
- Years: Team
- –: HC Wittenbach
- –: LC Brühl Handball

Senior clubs
- Years: Team
- 2019–: LC Brühl Handball
National team
Years	Team	Apps	(Gls)
2018–	Switzerland	37	(61)
- Updated on 14 November 2024

Malin Altherr (born 14 February 2003) is a Swiss female handballer for LC Brühl Handball in the Spar Premium League and the Swiss national team.

She made her official debut on the Swiss national team on 30 November 2018, against Lithuania. She represented Switzerland for the first time at the 2022 European Women's Handball Championship in Slovenia, Montenegro and North Macedonia.

== Achievements ==
- SPAR Premium League
  - Winner: 2019, 2023
  - Bronze Medalist: 2022
- Swiss Cup
  - Winner: 2023
- Swiss SuperCup
  - Winner: 2019, 2020
