= Xenia Hodel =

Swiss handball player (born 1998)

Personal information
- Full name: Xenia Hodel
- Nationality: Swiss
- Born: 27 November 1998 (age 27) Lucerne, Switzerland
- Height: 1.76 m (5 ft 9 in)

Sport
- Sport: Handball
- Position: Right back
- Current club: Spono Eagles
- Number: 22

Senior clubs
- Years: Team
- 2014–2018: Spono Eagles
- 2018–2019: Bayer 04 Leverkusen
- 2019–: Spono Eagles
National team
Years	Team	Apps	(Gls)
2022–	Switzerland	61	(202)

Xenia Hodel (born 27 November 1998) is a Swiss female handballer for Spono Eagles in the Spar Premium League and the Swiss national team.

She made her official debut on the Swiss national team on 7 October 2015, against Germany. She represented Switzerland for the first time at the 2022 European Women's Handball Championship in Slovenia, Montenegro and North Macedonia.

== Achievements ==
- SPAR Premium League
  - Winner: 2018, 2022
- Swiss Cup
  - Winner: 2018
