= Nuria Bucher =

Swiss handball player (born 2005)

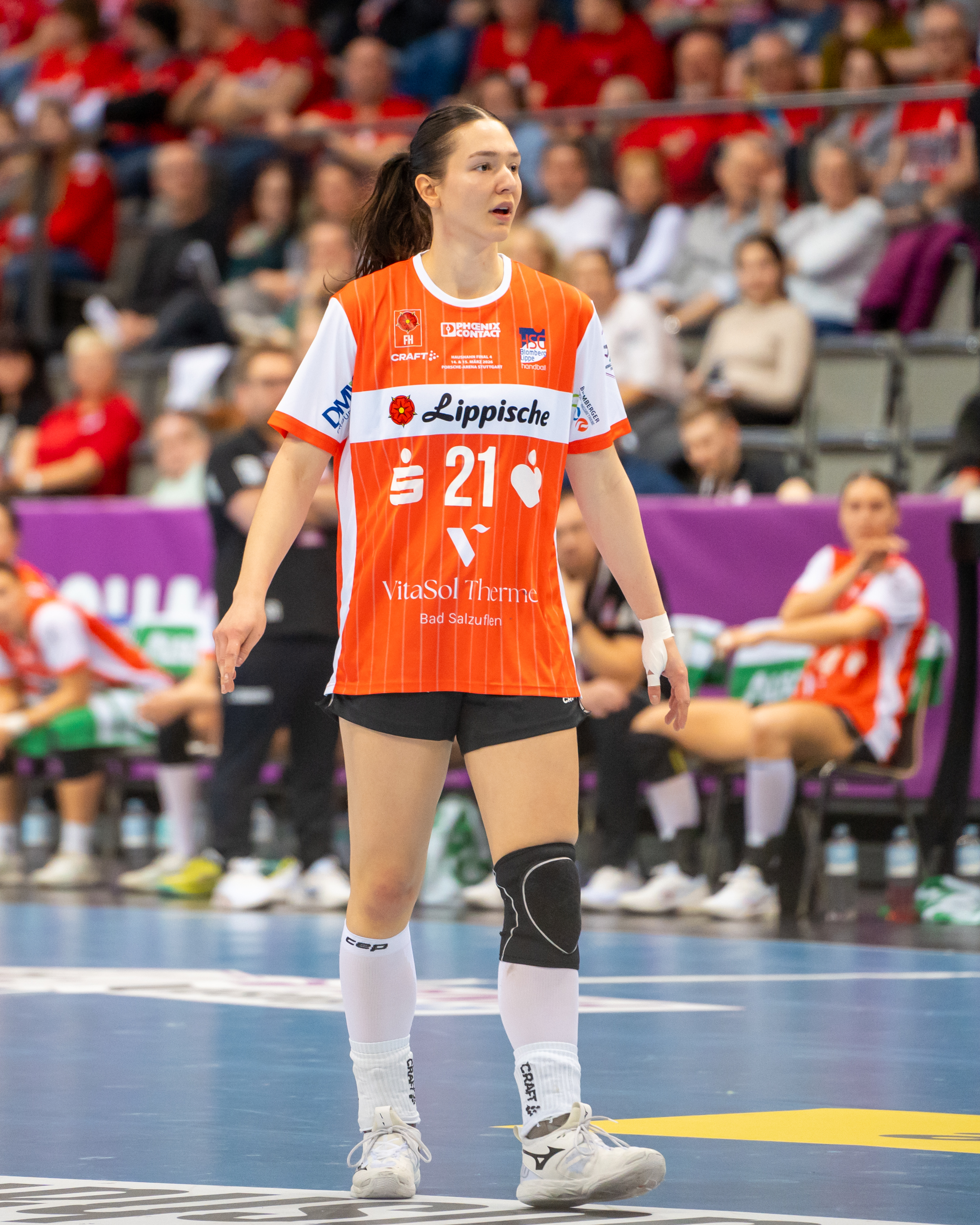

Personal information
- Full name: Nuria Bucher
- Nationality: Swiss
- Born: 21 March 2005 (age 21) Aarau, Switzerland
- Height: 1.77 m (5 ft 10 in)

Sport
- Sport: Handball
- Position: Centre back
- Current club: HSG Blomberg-Lippe
- Number: 21

Youth career
- Years: Team
- –2018: HSC Suhr Aarau
- 2018–2022: Spono Eagles

Senior clubs
- Years: Team
- 2022–2025: Spono Eagles
- 2025–: HSG Blomberg-Lippe
National team
Years	Team	Apps	(Gls)
2022–	Switzerland	43	(87)
- Updated on 3 July 2026

Nuria Bucher (born 21 March 2005) is a Swiss female handballer for German Bundesliga team HSG Blomberg-Lippe and the Swiss national team.

She made her official debut on the Swiss national team on 3 March 2022, against Lithuania. She represented Switzerland for the first time at the 2022 European Women's Handball Championship in Slovenia, Montenegro and North Macedonia.
