= Kundig =

Kundig or Kündig is a surname. Notable people with the surname include:

- Kerstin Kündig (b. 1993), Swiss handballer
- Tom Kundig (b. 1954), American architect
