= Sev Albrecht =

Swiss handball player (born 2005)

Personal information
- Full name: Sev Albrecht
- Nationality: Swiss
- Born: 26 April 2005 (age 21) Lucerne, Switzerland
- Height: 1.62 m (5 ft 4 in)

Sport
- Sport: Handball
- Position: Right wing
- Current club: HV Herzogenbuchsee
- Number: 22

Senior clubs
- Years: Team
- 2021–: HV Herzogenbuchsee
National team
Years	Team	Apps	(Gls)
2022–	Switzerland	8	(1)

Sev Albrecht (born 26 April 2005) is a Swiss female handballer for HV Herzogenbuchsee in the Spar Premium League and the Swiss national team.

She made her official debut on the Swiss national team on 29 September 2022, against Norway. She represented Switzerland for the first time at the 2022 European Women's Handball Championship in Slovenia, Montenegro and North Macedonia.
