= 2011–12 Handball-Bundesliga (women) =

Handball-Bundesliga
- Season: 2011–12
- Champions: Thüringer HC
- Relegated: SVG Celle; VfL Sindelfingen
- Champions League: Thüringer HC; Buxtehuder SV; HC Leipzig

The 2011–12 Handball-Bundesliga was the 27th season of the Handball-Bundesliga, Germany's premier women's handball league.

== Team information ==
Location of teams in the 2011–12 Handball-Bundesliga

| Team | Arena | Capacity |
|---|---|---|
| HC Leipzig | Arena Leipzig | 7.000 |
| Frisch Auf Göppingen | EWS Arena | 5.500 |
| DJK/MJC Trier | Arena Trier | 4.500 |
| Bayer Leverkusen | Smidt-Arena | 3.500 |
| VfL Oldenburg | EWE ARENA | 2.300 |
| Frankfurter HC | Brandenburg-Halle | 2.500 |
| Buxtehuder SV | Schulzentrum Nord | 1.800 |
| Thüringer HC | Salza-Halle | 1.200 |
| SVG Celle | HBG-Halle | 1.000 |
| VfL Sindelfingen | Sommerhofenhalle | 1.000 |
| HSG Bad Wildungen | Ensesporthalle | 800 |
| HSG Blomberg-Lippe | Sporthalle an der Ulmenallee | 750 |

== Regular season ==
=== Standings ===
| | Team | Pld | W | D | L | GF | GA | Diff | Pts | Qualification or relegation |
|---|---|---|---|---|---|---|---|---|---|---|
| 1. | Thüringer HC | 20 | 16 | 0 | 4 | 596 | 482 | +114 | 32:8 | Qualification to the play-offs |
| 2. | Buxtehuder SV | 20 | 15 | 2 | 3 | 560 | 506 | +54 | 32:8 | Qualification to the play-offs |
| 3. | HC Leipzig | 20 | 14 | 2 | 4 | 536 | 470 | +66 | 30:10 | Qualification to the play-offs |
| 4. | VfL Oldenburg | 20 | 14 | 1 | 5 | 593 | 544 | +49 | 29:11 | Qualification to the play-offs |
| 5. | Bayer 04 Leverkusen | 20 | 9 | 4 | 7 | 560 | 545 | +15 | 22:18 | Qualification to the play-offs |
| 6. | FHC Frankfurt/Oder | 20 | 10 | 1 | 9 | 561 | 527 | +34 | 21:19 | Qualification to the play-offs |
| 7. | Frisch Auf Göppingen | 20 | 7 | 3 | 10 | 514 | 526 | −12 | 17:23 | Qualification to the play-offs |
| 8. | HSG Blomberg-Lippe | 20 | 7 | 2 | 11 | 554 | 557 | −3 | 16:24 | Qualification to the play-offs |
| 9. | HSG Bad Wildungen | 20 | 6 | 2 | 12 | 492 | 556 | −64 | 14:26 | |
| 10. | DJK/MJC Trier | 20 | 2 | 1 | 17 | 474 | 607 | −133 | 5:35 | |
| 11. | SVG Celle | 20 | 0 | 2 | 18 | 468 | 588 | −120 | 2:38 | Relegation to the 2012–13 2. Handball-Bundesliga |
| 12. | VfL Sindelfingen | 0 | 0 | 0 | 0 | 0 | 0 | ±0 | 0:0 | Relegation to the 2012–13 2. Handball-Bundesliga |

=== Results ===
| | THÜ | LEI | BUX | LEV | OLD | FRA | BLO | FAG | TRI | BAD | CEL |
|---|---|---|---|---|---|---|---|---|---|---|---|
| Thüringer HC | | 23 : 32 | 32 : 24 | 37 : 29 | 32 : 30 | 30 : 26 | 34 : 22 | 34 : 26 | 39 : 17 | 31 : 19 | 37 : 24 |
| HC Leipzig | 19 : 28 | | 32 : 21 | 29 : 29 | 28 : 25 | 27 : 24 | 28 : 24 | 23 : 21 | 32 : 19 | 26 : 28 | 29 : 14 |
| Buxtehuder SV | 22 : 21 | 23 : 18 | | 21 : 21 | 33 : 30 | 26 : 23 | 25 : 23 | 30 : 28 | 34 : 24 | 30 : 26 | 33 : 26 |
| TSV Bayer 04 Leverkusen | 23 : 27 | 23 : 27 | 31 : 36 | | 31 : 26 | 30 : 34 | 35 : 29 | 24 : 21 | 32 : 24 | 30 : 31 | 27 : 23 |
| VfL Oldenburg | 27 : 26 | 26 : 26 | 25 : 32 | 32 : 25 | | 31 : 30 | 34 : 26 | 30 : 23 | 30 : 25 | 28 : 19 | 34 : 30 |
| Frankfurter HC | 25 : 27 | 30 : 20 | 23 : 22 | 22 : 22 | 24 : 32 | | 32 : 33 | 36 : 20 | 29 : 21 | 29 : 28 | 31 : 27 |
| HSG Blomberg-Lippe | 27 : 31 | 25 : 26 | 30 : 31 | 28 : 30 | 23 : 30 | 24 : 29 | | 26 : 24 | 35 : 27 | 30 : 23 | 31 : 18 |
| Frisch Auf Göppingen | 26 : 25 | 20 : 24 | 27 : 27 | 25 : 25 | 31 : 32 | 27 : 30 | 30 : 30 | | 27 : 19 | 29 : 23 | 28 : 25 |
| DJK/MJC Trier | 21 : 30 | 22 : 28 | 20 : 30 | 26 : 32 | 30 : 32 | 26 : 25 | 25 : 34 | 28 : 33 | | 26 : 28 | 28 : 24 |
| HSG Bad Wildungen | 21 : 22 | 25 : 31 | 24 : 30 | 19 : 31 | 26 : 33 | 32 : 30 | 22 : 22 | 16 : 25 | 28 : 21 | | 29 : 27 |
| SVG Celle | 22 : 30 | 20 : 31 | 22 : 30 | 28 : 30 | 24 : 26 | 22 : 29 | 23 : 32 | 19 : 23 | 25 : 25 | 25 : 25 | |

== Champion play-off ==
=== Quarter finals ===
| Team 1 | Agg. | Team 2 | 1st leg | 2nd leg |
|---|---|---|---|---|
| Bayer Leverkusen | 54 - 49 | VfL Oldenburg | 26 - 21 | 28 - 28 |
| Frankfurter HC | 46 - 50 | HC Leipzig | 21 - 26 | 25 - 24 |
| FA Göppingen | 44 - 63 | Buxtehuder SV | 24 - 28 | 20 - 35 |
| HSG Blomberg-Lippe | 51 - 56 | Thüringer HC | 26 - 29 | 25 - 27 |

=== Semifinals ===
| Team 1 | Agg. | Team 2 | 1st leg | 2nd leg |
|---|---|---|---|---|
| Bayer Leverkusen | 51 - 54 | Thüringer HC | 26 - 25 | 25 - 29 |
| HC Leipzig | 50 - 50 | Buxtehuder SV | 31 - 23 | 19 - 27 |

=== Finals ===
| Team 1 | Agg. | Team 2 | 1st leg | 2nd leg |
|---|---|---|---|---|
| Buxtehuder SV | 52 - 53 | Thüringer HC | 26 - 25 | 26 - 28 |
