= Sibylle Scherer =

Swiss handball player

Personal information
- Full name: Sibylle Scherer
- Nationality: Swiss
- Born: 9 January 1992 (age 34) Zug, Switzerland
- Height: 1.80 m (5 ft 11 in)

Sport
- Sport: Handball
- Position: Left back
- Current club: LK Zug
- Number: 8

Senior clubs
- Years: Team
- 2010–: LK Zug
National team
- Years: Team
- 2012–: Switzerland

Sibylle Scherer (born 9 January 1992) is a Swiss handballer who plays for LK Zug and the Switzerland national team.

== Achievements ==
- Swiss Premium League:
  - Winner: 2013, 2014, 2015
