= Daphne Gautschi =

Swiss handball player

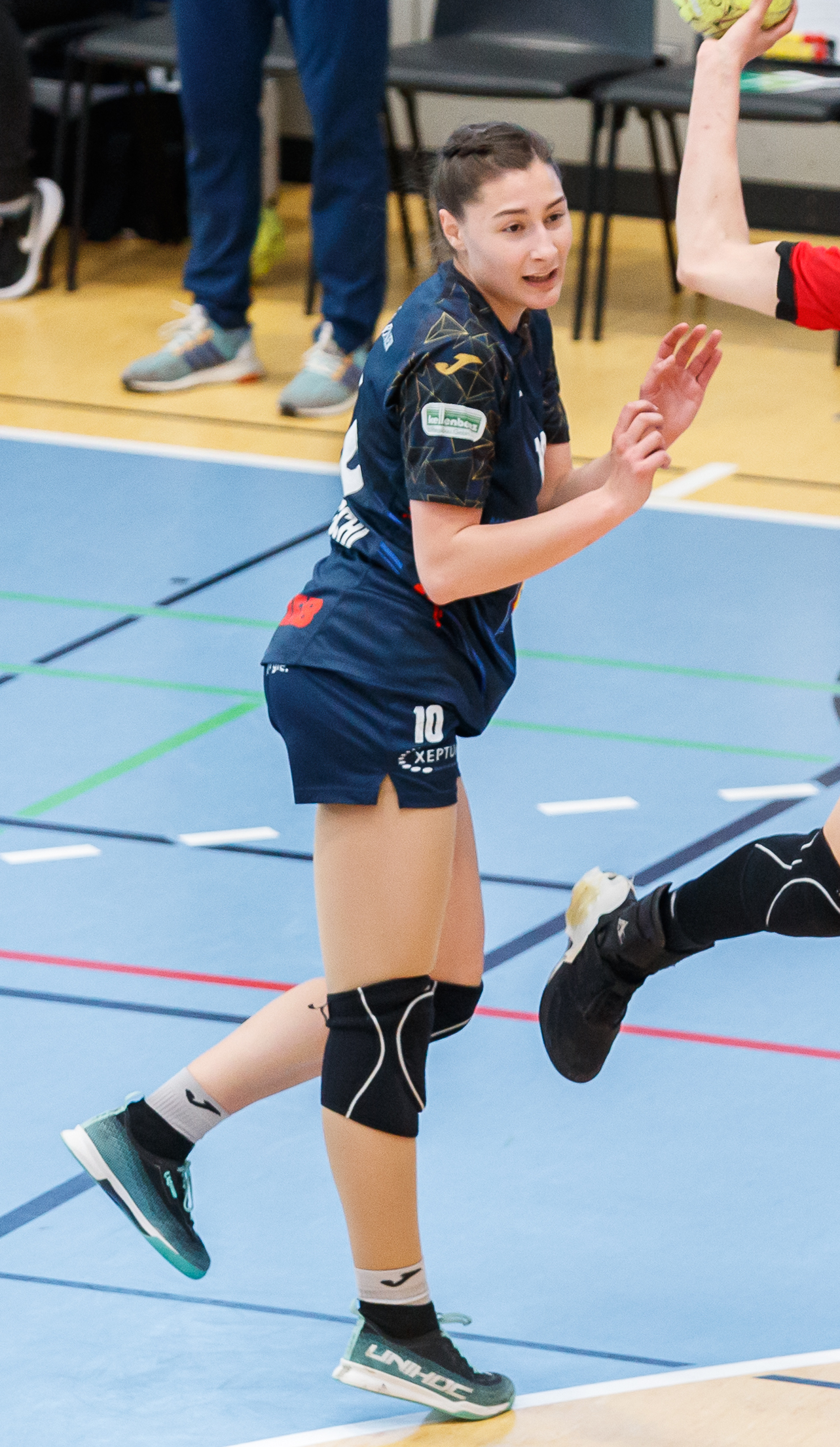
- Gautschi in 2022

Personal information
- Nationality: Swiss
- Born: 9 July 2000 (age 26) Muri, Switzerland
- Height: 1.73 m (5 ft 8 in)

Sport
- Sport: Handball
- Position: Left Back
- Current club: SCM Râmnicu Vâlcea
- Number: 10

Youth career
- Years: Team
- –: TV Muri
- –: LK Zug

Senior clubs
- Years: Team
- 2014: TV Muri
- 2014–2017: LK Zug
- 2017–2021: Metz Handball
- 2019–2020: → SG BBM Bietigheim (loan)
- 2020–2021: Metz Handball
- 2021–2023: Neckarsulmer SU
- 2023–2025: Handball Plan-de-Cuques
- 2025–: SCM Râmnicu Vâlcea
National team
| Years | Team | Apps | (Gls) |
| 2017– | Switzerland | 53 | (182) |
- Updated on 14 November 2024

Daphne Gautschi (born 09 July 2000) is a Swiss handball player for SCM Râmnicu Vâlcea and the Swiss national team.

== Achievements ==
- Swiss U17 Youth Championship
  - Winner 2015
- Swiss U19 Youth Championship
  - Winner 2016
- Swiss Championship (SPL1)
  - Finalist 2017
- First National team appearance
  - 06.06.2017 against Slovakia
- First Champions League appearance
  - 19.11.2017 against SG BBM Bietigheim (1 goal)
