= Rize Sports Hall =

Multi-sport indoor arena in Rize, Turkey

- Rize Spor Salonu
- Interactive map of Rize Sports Hall
- Location: Rize, Turkey
- Coordinates: 41°01′37″N 40°29′38″E
- Owner: Youth Services and Sports Directorate of Rize Province
- Capacity: 3,000

Construction
- Opened: March 12, 2015; 11 years ago

Rize Sports Hall (Turkish: Rize Spor Salonu) is a multi-sport indoor arena in Rize, [Turkey. Built in 2015, it is owned by the Youth Services and Sports Directorate of Rize Province. The sports hall has a seating capacity of 3,000. It is situated in a sports complex.

The construction of the sport complex began on March 23, 2012 with a groundbreaking ceremony attended by government ministers. The construction cost of the project was given with ₺ 35 million (approx. US$ 19.5 million as of March 2012). The facility was completed on March 12, 2015. It hosted sport wrestling events and basketball matches.

The sports hall hosted the 2016 European Women's Handball Championship qualification match of Turkey against Denmark on June 1, 2016.
