= Fabienne Tomasini =

Austrian handballer (born 1997)

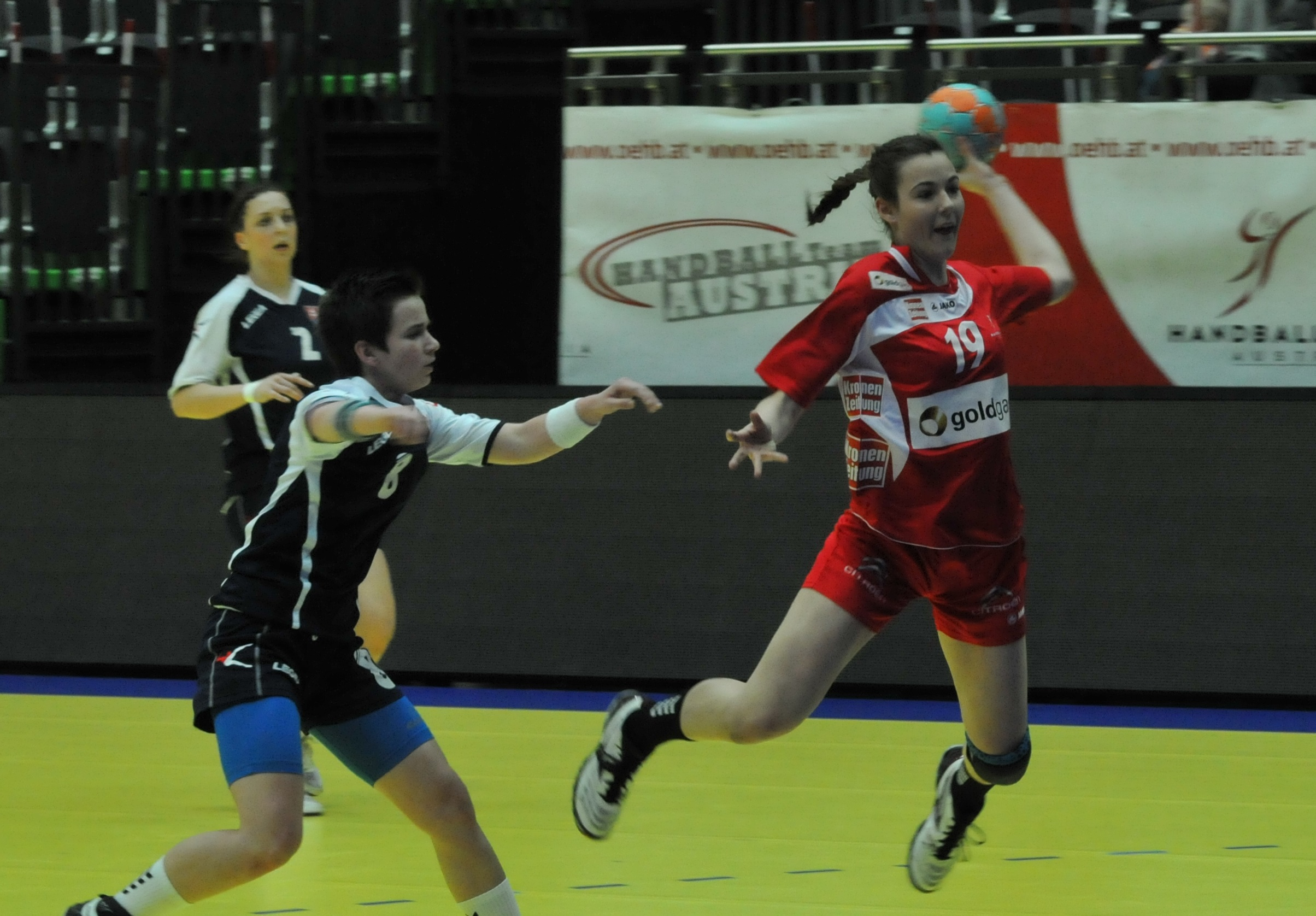

Personal information
- Nationality: Austrian
- Born: 14 July 1997 (age 29) Lustenau, Austria
- Height: 1.74 m (5 ft 9 in)

Sport
- Sport: Handball
- Position: Right wing
- Current club: LC Brühl Handball
- Number: 15

Senior clubs
- Years: Team
- 2015-2018: SSV Dornbirn Schoren
- 2018-: LC Brühl Handball
National team
Years	Team	Apps	(Gls)
2018–	Austria	39	(65)
- Updated on 6 November 2024

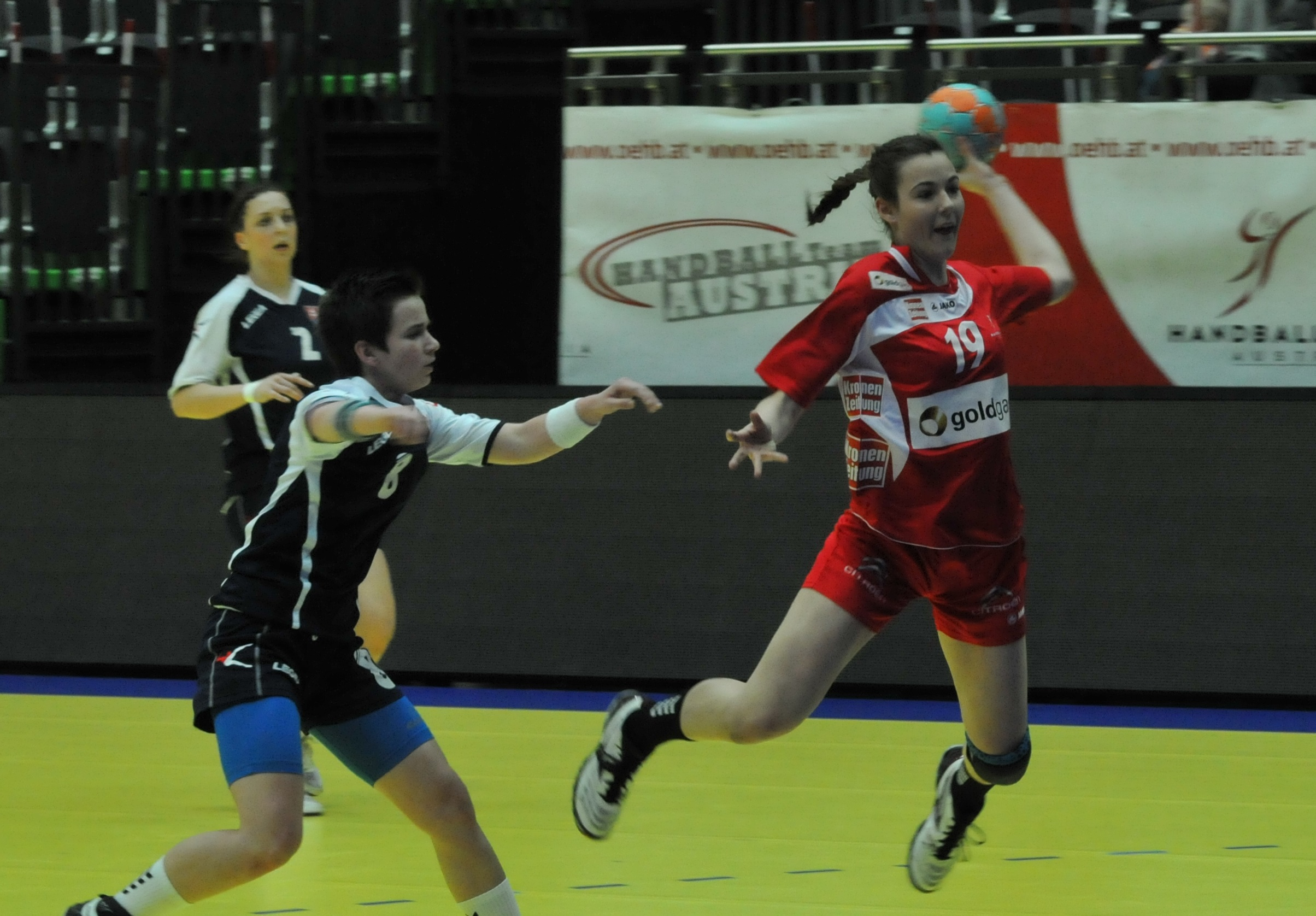
Martina Blehova, Silvia Kocanikova, and Fabienne Tomasini

Fabienne Tomasini (born 14 July 1997) is an Austrian handballer for LC Brühl Handball and the Austrian national team.

She represented Austria at the 2021 World Women's Handball Championship, placing 16th.
