= Martina Školková =

Slovak handball player (born 1984)

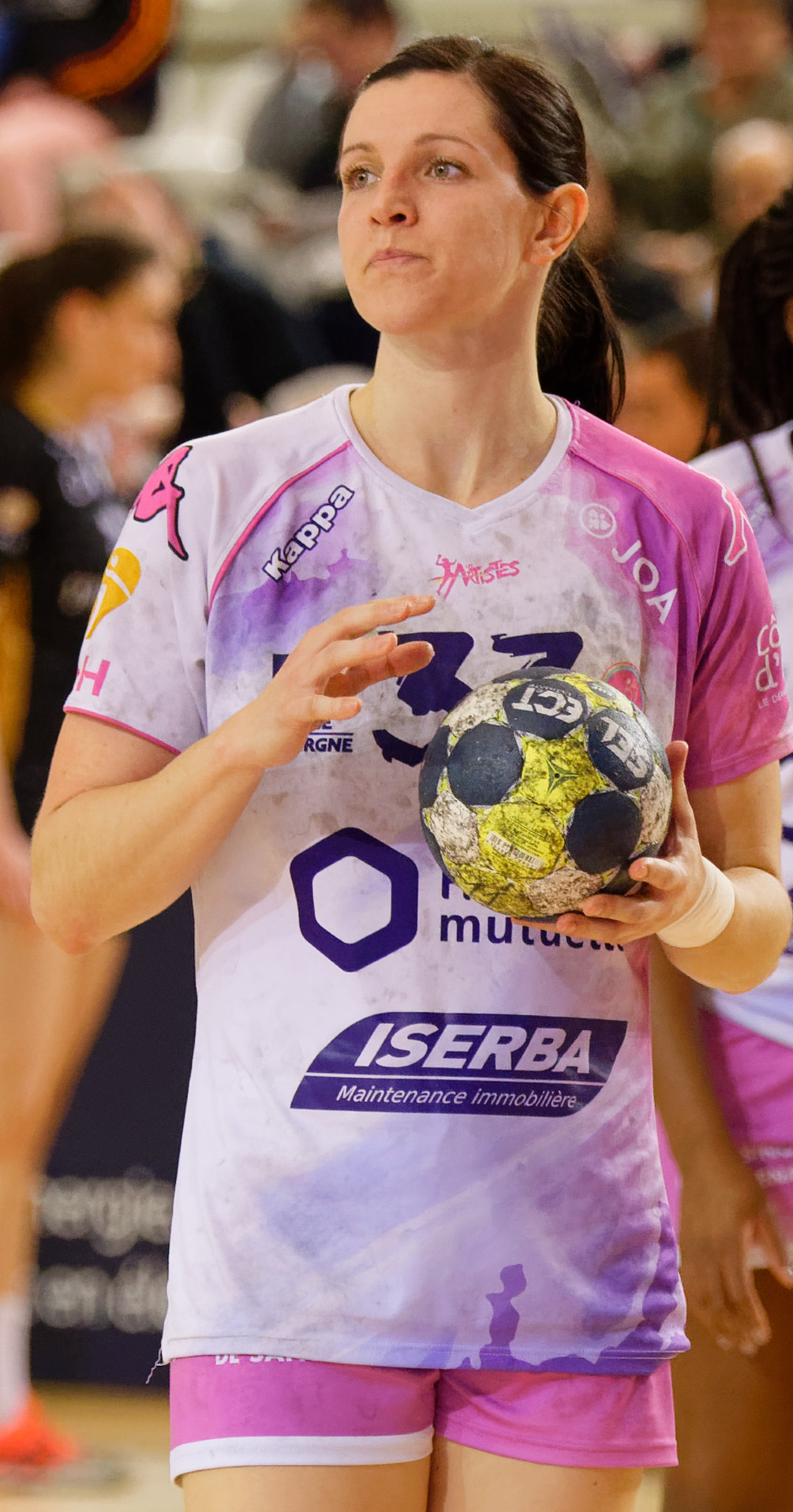
- Martina Školková in 2018

Personal information
- Nationality: Slovak
- Born: 21 December 1984 (age 41) Partizánske, Czechoslovakia
- Height: 1.73 m (5 ft 8 in)

Sport
- Sport: Handball
- Position: Left back

Senior clubs
- Years: Team
- 2004–2007: IUVENTA Michalovce
- 2007–2009: SKP Bratislava
- 2009–2018: Jeanne d'Arc Dijon Handball
- 2018–2022: Nice
National team
Years	Team	Apps	(Gls)
–	Slovakia	69	(134)

Martina Školková (born 21 December 1984) is a former Slovak handballer who played for the Slovak national team.
