= HSG Bad Wildungen =

German handball club

- Full name: HSG Bad Wildungen/ Friedrichstein/ Bergheim
- Short name: Vipers
- Founded: 1923; 102 years ago
- Arena: Ensesporthalle
- Capacity: 800
- President: Katharina Merck
- Head coach: Tessa Bremmer
- League: 2nd Bundesliga
- 2024–25: 15th
- Club colours
Home	Away

HSG Bad Wildungen is a German women's handball club from Bad Wildungen, competing in the Frauen Handball-Bundesliga.

== Kits ==
HOME
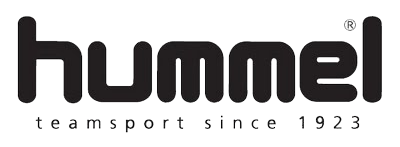
2018-19

== Team ==
=== Current squad ===
Squad for the 2022-23 season

Goalkeepers

- 1 (Netherlands) Larissa Schutrups
- 12 (Switzerland) Manuela Brütsch

Wings
RW

- 4 (Germany) Maren Gajewski
- 44 (Canada) Maksi Pallas

LW

- 14 (Norway) Thea Øby-Olsen
- 28 (Germany) Julia Symanzik

Pivots

- 2 (Germany) Annika Ingenpaß
- 45 (Germany) Jolina Huhnstock

Back players
LB

- 23 (Germany) Marieke Blase
- 32 (Germany) Verena Oßwald

CB

- 9 (Germany) Emma Ruwe
- 10 (Germany) Anika Hampel

RB

- 6 (Netherlands) Anouk Nieuwenweg
- 22 (Germany) Jana Scheib
- 59 (Germany) Lisa-Marie Preis

=== Transfers ===
Transfers for the 2023–24 season

Joining

Leaving
