= Spono Eagles =

Swiss handball club

- Full name: Spono Eagles
- Founded: 1971; 55 years ago
- Arena: Schweizerisches Paraplegikerzentrum, Nottwil
- Capacity: 1,200
- President: Andreas Balmer
- Head coach: Mirko Funke (SWI)
- League: Spar Premium League
- 2024–25: 2nd
Home	Away

Spono Eagles is a Swiss women's handball club from Nottwil founded in 1971. Reaching the Swiss Premium League in 1988, it has been a regular in EHF competitions since the 1990s, and it won three national championships between 2000 and 2006. Spono's best international results to date were reaching the Round of 16 of the EHF Cup and the Challenge Cup. In its three appearances in the Champions League it was defeated in the first qualifying round. 2015 they changed the name from Spono Nottwil to Spono Eagles.

Location of Spono Eagles

== Titles ==
- Swiss Premium League
  - 2000, 2001, 2006, 2018, 2022
- Swiss Cups
  - 2001, 2011, 2013, 2018, 2019, 2025

== European record ==
Season	Competition	Round	Club	1st leg	2nd leg	Aggregate
2016–17	EHF Cup	R1	(Kosovo) KHF Pristina	41–14	30–16	71–30
2016–17	EHF Cup	R2	(Russia) HC Kuban Krasnodar	23–35	28–38	51–73
2017–18	Challenge Cup	R3	(Turkey) Zagnosspor	28–35	20–23	48–58
2019–20	EHF Cup	R1	(Slovakia) IUVENTA Michalovce	25–32	25–31	50–63
2020–21	EHF Cup	Round 3	(Switzerland) Wacker Thun	30–17		
2020–21	EHF Cup	Last 16	(Netherlands) JuRo Urinek BV	(walkover)		
2020–21	EHF Cup	Quarterfinals	(Czech Republic) DHC Slavia Prague	(walkover)		
2021–22	EHF Cup	Round 3	(Kosovo) KH Vushtrria	41–6	42–14	83–20
2021–22	EHF Cup	Last 16	(Faroe Islands) H71	26–36	31–29	57–65
2022–23	EHF European League	R2	(Norway) Fana	21–36	31–28	52–64

== Team ==
=== Current squad ===
Squad for the 2022–23 season

Goalkeepers

- 1 (Switzerland) Soraya Schaller
- 12 (Switzerland) Marion Ort
- 26 (Switzerland) Aline Strebel

Wingers
RW

- 4 (Switzerland) Samira Schardt
- 5 (Switzerland) Carmen Jund
- 8 (Switzerland) Mia Emmenegger

LW

- 19 (Switzerland) Sabrina Amrein
- 22 (Switzerland) Marina Decurtins

Line players

- 18 (Switzerland) Livia Amrein
- 20 (Denmark) Thilde Harbo Boesen

Back players
LB

- 9 (Switzerland) Alina Stähelin
- 11 (Switzerland) Mareike Müller
- 23 (Switzerland) Lisa Maria Schenk

CB

- 3 (Switzerland) Ana Emmenegger
- 10 (Switzerland) Kira Zumstein
- 27 (Switzerland) Catherina Csebits

RB

- 13 (Switzerland) Xenia Hodel
