= LK Zug =

Swiss handball club

- Full name: Leichathletik Klub Zug Handball
- Founded: 1948; 77 years ago
- Arena: Zug Sporthalle, Zug
- Head coach: Christoph Sahli
- League: Spar Premium League
- 2021-22: 2nd
- Club colours
Home	Away

LK Zug is a Swiss women's handball club from Zug. They won four national championships between 2010 and 2016. They have been a regular in EHF competitions since the 1990s, participating twice to the EHF Champions League.

Location of LK Zug

== Kits ==
HOME
2016-2018	2019-

AWAY
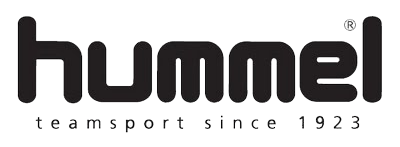
2019-

== Titles ==
- Swiss Premium League (5)
  - 2010, 2013, 2014, 2015, 2021
- Swiss Cups (4)
  - 2014, 2015, 2021, 2022
- Swiss Supercup (1)
  - 2016

== European record ==
Season	Competition	Round	Club	1st leg	2nd leg	Aggregate
2016-17	Challenge Cup	R3	(United Kingdom) Olympia HC	45–17	40–7	85–24
2016-17	Challenge Cup	1/8	(Ukraine) HC Karpaty	29–25	36–25	65–50
2016-17	Challenge Cup	1/4	(Netherlands) Virto/Quintus	12–35	29–34	41–69

== Team ==
=== Current squad ===
Squad for the 2016–17 season

Goalkeepers

- (Switzerland) Marion Betschart
- (Switzerland) Jennifer Hotz
- (United Kingdom) Laura Innes
- (Switzerland) Sarah Stocker

Wingers
LW

- (Switzerland) Stefanie Javet

RW

- (Switzerland) Laura Masset
- (Switzerland) Stefanie Stücheli

Line players

- (Switzerland) Alena Müller
- (Switzerland) Soka Smitran

Back players
LB

- (Switzerland) Daphne Gautschi
- (Switzerland) Shanice Kägi
- (Switzerland) Sibylle Scherer

CB

- (Switzerland) Ria Estermann
- (Switzerland) Ivana Ravlic
- (Switzerland) Leah Stutz
- (Switzerland) Svenja Stutz

RB

- (Switzerland) Daria Betschart
- (Switzerland) Yael Gwerder
- (Switzerland) Martina Traber
- (Switzerland) Nina Van Polanen
