= LC Brühl Handball =

Swiss handball club

- Full name: LC Brühl Handball St. Gallen
- Short name: LCB
- Founded: 1965; 61 years ago
- Arena: Sportanlage Kreuzbleiche
- Capacity: 4,200
- Head coach: Nicolaj Andersson
- League: Spar Premium League
- Club colours
Home	Away

LC Brühl Handball is a women's handball club from St. Gallen in Switzerland. LC Brühl Handball competes in the Spar Premium League. With 34 league titles and 12 cups, it is the most winning club in Swiss women's handball.

Location of LC Brühl

== Kits ==
HOME
2017-18	2018-19	2019-20	2020-

AWAY
2018-19	2020-

== Sports Hall information ==
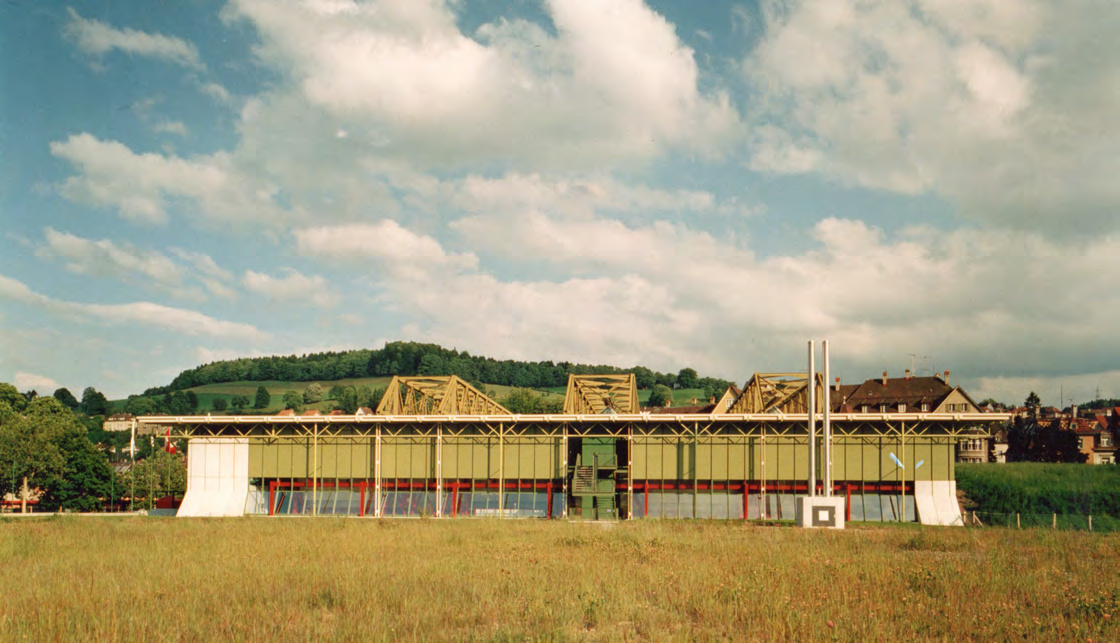
Home hall: Sportanlage Kreuzbleiche

- Name: – Sportanlage Kreuzbleiche
- City: – St. Gallen
- Capacity: – 4200
- Address: – Bogenstrasse 10. 9000 St. Gallen, Switzerland

== Titles ==
- Spar Premium League
  - Winners (34) : 1970, 1971, 1972, 1973, 1974, 1975, 1976, 1977, 1978, 1979, 1980, 1987, 1988, 1989, 1990, 1991, 1992, 1993, 1994, 1995, 1996, 1997, 2002, 2003, 2007, 2008, 2009, 2011, 2012, 2017, 2019, 2023, 2024, 2025
- Switzerland Handball Cup
  - Winners (12) : 2002, 2003, 2004, 2006, 2008, 2009, 2010, 2012, 2016, 2017, 2023, 2024
- Swiss SuperCup
  - Winners (3): 2021, 2023, 2024

== European record ==
Season	Competition	Round	Club	1st leg	2nd leg	Aggregate
2013–14	EHF Cup	R2	(Russia) Dinamo Volgograd	15–36	22–36	37–72
2014–15	EHF Cup	R2	(Czech Republic) HC Baník Most	21–27	25–25	46–52
2015–16	EHF Cup	R2	(Poland) Pogoń Baltica Szczecin	23–31	19–28	42–59
2016–17	EHF Cup	R1	(France) Issy Paris Hand	23–30	20–29	43–59
2017–18	EHF-Cup	R1	(Kosovo) KHF Prishtina	34–11	32–15	66–26
2017–18	EHF-Cup	R2	(Russia) Zvezda Zvenigorod	25–29	28–24	53–53 (a)
2018–19	EHF-Cup	R1	(Turkey) Kastamonu Bld. GSK	19–31	27–27	46–58
2019–20	EHF-Cup	R1	(Sweden) H 65 Höör	24–32	19–43	43–75
2020–21	EHF European League	R2	(Hungary) Alba Fehérvár KC	(walkover)		
2021–22	EHF European League	R2	(Poland) Zagłębie Lubin	19–35	24–33	43–68
2022–23	EHF European League	R2	(Czech Republic) DHC Plzeň	30–27	28–25	58–52
2022–23	EHF European League	R3	(Hungary) Praktiker-Vác	29–38	26–30	55–68
2023–24	EHF European League	R3	(Croatia) RK Lokomotiva Zagreb	23–28	20–25	43–53
2024–25	EHF European League	R3	(Norway) Storhamar HE	32–37	23–33	55–70

== Team ==
=== Current squad ===
Squad for the 2022–23 season

Goalkeepers

- 12 (Switzerland) Fabia Schlachter
- 16 (Switzerland) Sladana Dokovic

Wingers
RW

- 15 (Austria) Fabienne Tomasini
- 44 (Austria) Matea Baric

LW

- 21 (Switzerland) Stéphanie Lüscher
- 24 (Switzerland) Dimitra Hess

Line players

- 7 (Croatia) Martina Pavić
- 9 (Switzerland) Mirjam Ackermann
- 17 (Switzerland) Tabea Schmid

Back players
LB

- 3 (Denmark) Mathilde Schæfer
- 4 (Germany) Mia Kernatsch
- 19 (Switzerland) Yara Mosimann
- 25 (Switzerland) Angela Zürni
- 77 (Switzerland) Katarina Simova

CB

- 4 (Germany) Mia Kernatsch
- 14 (Switzerland) Laurentia Wolff
- 22 (Poland) Kinga Gutkowska

RB

- 10 (Switzerland) Malin Altherr
