= Switzerland women's national handball team =

Switzerland

Information
- Association: Swiss Handball Association
- Coach: Knut Ove Joa
- Assistant coach: Veronika Keller
- Most caps: Manuela Brütsch (173)
- Most goals: Vroni Keller (474)

Colours
1st	2nd

Results

World Championship
- Appearances: 1 (First in 2025)
- Best result: 19th (2025)

European Championship
- Appearances: 2 (First in 2022)
- Best result: 14th (2022)
- Last updated on Unknown.

The Switzerland women's national handball team is the national team of Switzerland. It takes part in international handball competitions.

They participated in a world championship for the first time in 2025, they also participated in a European championship for the first time in 2022. Switzerland co-hosted in 2024 along with Hungary and Austria.

== Competitive record ==
=== Olympic Games ===
Year	Position	GP	W	D	L	GS	GA	GD
(Canada) 1976	Did not qualify							
(Soviet Union) 1980	Did not qualify							
(United States) 1984	Did not qualify							
(South Korea) 1988	Did not qualify							
(Spain) 1992	Did not qualify							
(United States) 1996	Did not qualify							
(Australia) 2000	Did not qualify							
(Greece) 2004	Did not qualify							
(China) 2008	Did not qualify							
(United Kingdom) 2012	Did not qualify							
(Brazil) 2016	Did not qualify							
(Japan) 2020	Did not qualify							
(France) 2024	Did not qualify							
(United States) 2028	TBD							
(Australia) 2032	TBD							
Total	0/15	0	0	0	0	0	0	0

=== World Championship ===
Year	Position	GP	W	D	L	GS	GA	GD
(Socialist Federal Republic of Yugoslavia) 1957	Did not qualify							
(Romania) 1962	Did not qualify							
(West Germany) 1965	Did not qualify							
(Netherlands) 1971	Did not qualify							
(Socialist Federal Republic of Yugoslavia) 1973	Did not qualify							
(Soviet Union) 1975	Did not qualify							
(Czechoslovakia) 1978	Did not qualify							
(Hungary) 1982	Did not qualify							
(Netherlands) 1986	Did not qualify							
(South Korea) 1990	Did not qualify							
(Norway) 1993	Did not qualify							
(Hungary) 1995	Did not qualify							
(Germany) 1997	Did not qualify							
(Norway) 1999	Did not qualify							
(Italy) 2001	Did not qualify							
(Croatia) 2003	Did not qualify							
(Russia) 2005	Did not qualify							
(France) 2007	Did not qualify							
(China) 2009	Did not qualify							
(Brazil) 2011	Did not qualify							
(Serbia) 2013	Did not qualify							
(Denmark) 2015	Did not qualify							
(Germany) 2017	Did not qualify							
(Japan) 2019	Did not qualify							
(Spain) 2021	Did not qualify							
(Denmark) (Norway) (Sweden) 2023	Did not qualify							
(Germany) (Netherlands) 2025	19th	6	2	0	4	152	164	−12
(Hungary) 2027	TBD							
(Spain) 2029	TBD							
(Czech Republic) (Poland) 2031	TBD							
Total	1/30	6	2	0	4	152	164	−12

=== European Championship ===
Year	Position	GP	W	D	L	GS	GA	GD
(Germany) 1994	Did not qualify							
(Denmark) 1996	Did not qualify							
(Netherlands) 1998	Did not qualify							
(Romania) 2000	Did not qualify							
(Denmark) 2002	Did not qualify							
(Hungary) 2004	Did not qualify							
(Sweden) 2006	Did not qualify							
(North Macedonia) 2008	Did not qualify							
(Denmark) (Norway) 2010	Did not qualify							
(Serbia) 2012	Did not qualify							
(Hungary) (Croatia) 2014	Did not qualify							
(Sweden) 2016	Did not qualify							
(France) 2018	Did not qualify							
(Denmark) (Norway) 2020	Did not qualify							
(Slovenia) (North Macedonia) (Montenegro) 2022	14th	3	0	1	2	75	97	−22
(Austria) (Hungary) (Switzerland) 2024	12th	7	2	0	5	189	229	−40
(Czech Republic) (Poland) (Romania) (Slovakia) (Turkey) 2026	Qualified							
(Denmark) (Norway) (Sweden) 2028	TBD							
(Belgium) (France) 2030	TBD							
(Denmark) (Germany) (Poland) 2032	TBD							
Total	3/20	10	2	1	7	264	326	−62

== Current squad ==
The squad for the 2026 European Women's Handball Championship.

Head coach: Knut Ove Joa

No.	Pos.	Name	Date of birth (age)	Height	App.	Goals	Club
1	GK	Lea Schüpbach	10 September 1997 (age 29)	1.79 m	75	0	(Switzerland) Yellow Winterthur
4	CB	Laurentia Wolff	19 August 2003 (age 23)	1.77 m	38	28	(Germany) VfL Oldenburg
8	RW	Mia Emmenegger	17 January 2005 (age 21)	1.61 m	60	275	(Denmark) Team Esbjerg
10	LB	Daphne Gautschi	9 July 2000 (age 26)	1.72 m	82	304	(France) Toulon Métropole Var Handball
11	LB	Clairebel Coker	21 February 2005 (age 21)	1.77 m	13	6	(Switzerland) LC Brühl Handball
13	LW	Era Baumann	10 April 2007 (age 19)	1.67 m	36	82	(Denmark) Viborg HK
14	CB	Nuria Bucher	21 March 2005 (age 21)	1.79 m	45	95	(Germany) HSG Blomberg-Lippe
17	LB	Charlotte Kähr	27 June 2001 (age 25)	1.75 m	74	69	(Germany) TuS Metzingen
18	RB	Lea Schärer	6 September 2005 (age 21)	1.70 m	0	0	(Switzerland) GC Amicitia Zürich
20	LW	Alessia Riner	8 January 2004 (age 22)	1.74 m	49	115	(Germany) Sport-Union Neckarsulm
21	RB	Malin Altherr	14 February 2003 (age 23)	1.79 m	60	84	(Switzerland) LC Brühl Handball
23	LB	Celia Heinzer	19 May 2002 (age 24)	1.83 m	25	33	(Germany) VfL Waiblingen
27	RB	Yara Brunett	22 June 2007 (age 19)	1.78 m	5	0	(Switzerland) LK Zug
30	GK	Claire Hartz	2 September 2005 (age 21)	1.81 m	11	0	(Switzerland) LC Brühl Handball
32	GK	Seraina Kuratli	18 April 2007 (age 19)	1.76 m	24	1	(Switzerland) GC Amicitia Zürich
33	P	Nora Snedkerud	21 January 2005 (age 21)	1.80 m	33	27	(France) Piraths Handball
44	P	Joline Erni	18 April 2006 (age 20)	1.75 m	13	13	(Switzerland) GC Amicitia Zürich
83	RW	Sev Albrecht	26 April 2005 (age 21)	1.69 m	10	4	(Germany) HSG Freiburg
