= Frauen SHV-Cup =

Logo

The Frauen SHV-Cup (german) or Coupe du Suisse féminine de handball (french) is an annual single-elimination tournament for Swiss women's handball clubs organized by the Swiss Handball Federation (SHV). It was created in 2000.

LC Brühl is the most successful team in the competition with twelve titles, followed by Spono Nottwil with six and LK Zug with four.

== Finals ==
Season	Champion	Score	Runner-up
2000	TSV Saint Othmar	27–25	Spono Nottwil
2001	Spono Nottwil	35–26	TSV Saint Othmar
2002	LC Brühl	27–23	TSV Saint Othmar
2003	LC Brühl (2)	31–15	LK Zug
2004	LC Brühl (3)	26–21	LK Zug
2005	Amicitia Zürich	31–30	LK Zug
2006	LC Brühl (4)	24–21	Spono Nottwil
2007	TSV Saint Othmar (2)	24–23	LK Zug
2008	LC Brühl (5)	31–23	TSV Saint Othmar
2009	LC Brühl (6)	35–16	TSV Saint Othmar
2010	LC Brühl (7)	29–16	Basel Regio
2011	Spono Nottwil (2)	25–24	LC Brühl
2012	LC Brühl (8)	30–24	Yellow Winterthur
2013	Spono Nottwil (3)	23–21	Basel Regio
2014	LK Zug	27–17	SG Zofingen/Olten
2015	LK Zug (2)	34–28	Wacker Thun
2016	LC Brühl (9)	28–21	Pfadi Winterthur
2017	LC Brühl (10)	27–21	Wacker Thun
2018	Spono Eagles (4)	27–23	LC Brühl
2019	Spono Eagles (5)	27–25	Wacker Thun
2020	cancelled due to Covid-19		
2021	LK Zug (3)	29–26	Spono Eagles
2022	LK Zug (4)	37–36	Spono Eagles
2023	LC Brühl (11)	31–28	Spono Eagles
2024	LC Brühl (12)	37–30	LK Zug
2025	Spono Eagles (6)	24–23	LK Zug

== See also ==
- Swiss Men's Handball Cup
