= SPAR Premium League =

Highest league in Swiss women's handball

- Sport: Handball
- Founded: 1970
- Country: Switzerland
- Continent: Europe

The SPAR Premium League (SPL) is the premier women's handball league in Switzerland, established in 1970. LC Brühl is the championship's most successful club by a large margin with 31 titles including two 11-years winning streaks, followed by ATV Basel-Stadt with four and TSV St. Otmar and Spono Nottwil with three.

Currently the league is contested by eight teams. The champion is granted a spot in the Champions League's qualifying tournament.

== Current season ==
=== Teams for season 2020–21 ===
Location of teams in 2020–21 Spar Premium League
- DHB Rotweiss Thun
- GC Amicitia Zürich
- HSC Kreuzlingen
- HV Herzogenbuchsee
- LC Brühl Handball
- LK Zug
- SPONO EAGLES
- Yellow Winterthur

== List of champions ==
- 1970 LC Brühl
- 1971 LC Brühl (2)
- 1972 LC Brühl (3)
- 1973 LC Brühl (4)
- 1974 LC Brühl (5)
- 1975 LC Brühl (6)
- 1976 LC Brühl (7)
- 1977 LC Brühl (8)
- 1978 LC Brühl (9)
- 1979 LC Brühl (10)
- 1980 LC Brühl (11)
- 1981 RTV 1879 Basel
- 1982 ATV Basel-Stadt
- 1983 ATV Basel-Stadt (2)
- 1984 RTV 1879 Basel (3)
- 1985 ATV Basel-Stadt (4)
- 1986 ATV Basel-Stadt (5)
- 1987 LC Brühl (12)
- 1988 LC Brühl (13)
- 1989 LC Brühl (14)
- 1990 LC Brühl (15)
- 1991 LC Brühl (16)
- 1992 LC Brühl (17)
- 1993 LC Brühl (18)
- 1994 LC Brühl (19)
- 1995 LC Brühl (20)
- 1996 LC Brühl (21)
- 1997 LC Brühl (22)
- 1998 TSV St. Otmar
- 1999 TSV St. Otmar (2)
- 2000 Spono Nottwil
- 2001 Spono Nottwil (2)
- 2002 LC Brühl (23)
- 2003 LC Brühl (24)
- 2004 ZMC Amicitia Zürich
- 2005 TSV St. Otmar (3)
- 2006 Spono Nottwil (3)
- 2007 LC Brühl (25)
- 2008 LC Brühl (26)
- 2009 LC Brühl (27)
- 2010 LK Zug
- 2011 LC Brühl (28)
- 2012 LC Brühl (29)
- 2013 LK Zug (2)
- 2014 LK Zug (3)
- 2015 LK Zug (4)
- 2016 Spono Nottwil (4)
- 2017 LC Brühl (30)
- 2018 Spono Nottwil (5)
- 2019 LC Brühl (31)
- 2020 not awarded
- 2021 LK Zug (5)
- 2022 Spono Eagles (6)
- 2023 LC Brühl (32)
- 2024 LC Brühl (33)
- 2025 LC Brühl (34)

== See also ==
- SHV-Cup (Swiss women's national cup)
- Swiss Handball League (male counterpart)
