= 2017 European Women's U-19 Handball Championship =

Tournament details
- Host country: Slovenia
- Venues: 2 (in 1 host city)
- Dates: 27 July – 7 August
- Teams: 16 (from 1 confederation)

Final positions
- Champions: France (1st title)
- Runners-up: Denmark
- Third place: Hungary
- Fourth place: Germany

Tournament statistics
- Matches played: 56
- Goals scored: 2,804 (50.07 per match)
- Attendance: 9,376 (167 per match)
- Top scorers: (Romania) Sorina Tîrcă (56 goals)

Awards
- Best player: (Denmark) Kristina Jørgensen

The 2017 European Women's U-19 Handball Championship was the eleventh edition of the European Women's U-19 Handball Championship, held in Celje, Slovenia from 27 July to 7 August 2017.

France beat Russia in the final. Due to three Russians players using doping, they were later disqualified and had their silver medals taken away.

== Qualification ==
Competition	Dates	Host	Vacancies	Qualified
Host			1	Slovenia
Women's 17 EHF EURO 2015	13–23 August 2015	(North Macedonia) Skopje	2	Denmark; Russia
Qualification tournament	17–19 March 2017	Group 1 (North Macedonia) Skopje	2	Hungary; Macedonia
Qualification tournament	17–19 March 2017	Group 2 (Spain) Carballo	2	Spain; Romania
Qualification tournament	17–19 March 2017	Group 3 (Slovakia) Michalovce	2	France; Montenegro
Qualification tournament	17–19 March 2017	Group 4 (Croatia) Đurđevac	2	Croatia; Netherlands
Qualification tournament	17–19 March 2017	Group 5 (Czech Republic) Hodonín	2	Sweden; Serbia
Qualification tournament	17–19 March 2017	Group 6 (Belarus) Zhlobin	1	Portugal
Qualification tournament	17–19 March 2017	Group 7 (Greece) Myrina	1	Norway
Qualification tournament	17–19 March 2017	Group 8 (Germany) Regensburg	1	Germany

== Draw ==
The draw was held on 20 April 2017 in Paris.

Pot 1	Pot 2	Pot 3	Pot 4
Denmark; Russia; Hungary; Spain	Slovenia; Croatia; France; Sweden	Germany; Norway; Portugal; Romania	Netherlands; Macedonia; Montenegro; Serbia

== Preliminary round ==
All times are local (UTC+2).

=== Group A ===
Pos	Team	Pld	W	D	L	GF	GA	GD	Pts	Qualification
1	Hungary	3	2	0	1	83	71	+12	4 (Note: Netherlands 26–34 Hungary)	Main round
2	Netherlands	3	2	0	1	83	81	+2	4	Main round
3	Romania	3	1	0	2	71	80	−9	2 (Note: Romania 26–23 Sweden)	Intermediate round
4	Sweden	3	1	0	2	70	75	−5	2	Intermediate round

Source: EHF
Rules for classification: 1) points; 2) head-to-head points; 3) head-to-head goal difference; 4) head-to-head goals scored; 5) goal difference; 6) goals scored; 7) draw.
Notes:

27 July 2017; 13:00	Hungary	26–21	Romania	Zlatorog Arena, Celje; Attendance: 50; Referees: Kjær, Pedersen (DEN)
27 July 2017; 13:00	Háfra 8	(14–11)	Tîrcă 7	Zlatorog Arena, Celje; Attendance: 50; Referees: Kjær, Pedersen (DEN)
27 July 2017; 13:00	3× (yellow card) 2× (suspension)	Report	3× (yellow card) 3× (suspension) 1× (red card)	Zlatorog Arena, Celje; Attendance: 50; Referees: Kjær, Pedersen (DEN)

27 July 2017; 15:00	Sweden	23–26	Netherlands	Zlatorog Arena, Celje; Attendance: 400; Referees: Vujačić, Kažanegra (MNE)
27 July 2017; 15:00	Thorleifsdóttir 5	(8–11)	Housheer 7	Zlatorog Arena, Celje; Attendance: 400; Referees: Vujačić, Kažanegra (MNE)
27 July 2017; 15:00	2× (yellow card) 2× (suspension)	Report	2× (yellow card) 2× (suspension)	Zlatorog Arena, Celje; Attendance: 400; Referees: Vujačić, Kažanegra (MNE)

28 July 2017; 13:00	Netherlands	26–34	Hungary	Zlatorog Arena, Celje; Attendance: 77; Referees: Praštalo, Todorović (BIH)
28 July 2017; 13:00	Freriks 7	(14–18)	Klujber, Márton 8	Zlatorog Arena, Celje; Attendance: 77; Referees: Praštalo, Todorović (BIH)
28 July 2017; 13:00	3× (yellow card) 4× (suspension)	Report	3× (yellow card) 4× (suspension)	Zlatorog Arena, Celje; Attendance: 77; Referees: Praštalo, Todorović (BIH)

28 July 2017; 15:00	Romania	26–23	Sweden	Zlatorog Arena, Celje; Attendance: 100; Referees: Christidi, Papamattheou (GRE)
28 July 2017; 15:00	Tîrcă 8	(11–13)	Lerby, Olsson 4	Zlatorog Arena, Celje; Attendance: 100; Referees: Christidi, Papamattheou (GRE)
28 July 2017; 15:00	4× (yellow card) 3× (suspension)	Report	3× (yellow card) 4× (suspension)	Zlatorog Arena, Celje; Attendance: 100; Referees: Christidi, Papamattheou (GRE)

30 July 2017; 13:00	Hungary	23–24	Sweden	Zlatorog Arena, Celje; Attendance: 100; Referees: Freitas, Carvalho (POR)
30 July 2017; 13:00	Klujber 5	(14–12)	Olsson 7	Zlatorog Arena, Celje; Attendance: 100; Referees: Freitas, Carvalho (POR)
30 July 2017; 13:00	2× (yellow card) 4× (suspension)	Report	3× (yellow card) 4× (suspension)	Zlatorog Arena, Celje; Attendance: 100; Referees: Freitas, Carvalho (POR)

30 July 2017; 15:00	Romania	24–31	Netherlands	Zlatorog Arena, Celje; Attendance: 120; Referees: Kjær, Pedersen (DEN)
30 July 2017; 15:00	Tîrcă 7	(14–16)	Housheer 12	Zlatorog Arena, Celje; Attendance: 120; Referees: Kjær, Pedersen (DEN)
30 July 2017; 15:00	3× (yellow card) 4× (suspension)	Report	1× (yellow card) 4× (suspension)	Zlatorog Arena, Celje; Attendance: 120; Referees: Kjær, Pedersen (DEN)

=== Group B ===
Pos	Team	Pld	W	D	L	GF	GA	GD	Pts	Qualification
1	Russia	3	3	0	0	95	50	+45	6	Main round
2	Norway	3	2	0	1	80	63	+17	4	Main round
3	Croatia	3	1	0	2	75	69	+6	2	Intermediate round
4	Macedonia	3	0	0	3	49	117	−68	0	Intermediate round

Source: EHF
Rules for classification: 1) points; 2) head-to-head points; 3) head-to-head goal difference; 4) head-to-head goals scored; 5) goal difference; 6) goals scored; 7) draw.

27 July 2017; 17:00	Russia	23–15	Norway	Zlatorog Arena, Celje; Attendance: 100; Referees: Praštalo, Todorović (BIH)
27 July 2017; 17:00	Dudina, Skorobogatchenko 5	(11–10)	Reistad 3	Zlatorog Arena, Celje; Attendance: 100; Referees: Praštalo, Todorović (BIH)
27 July 2017; 17:00	2× (yellow card) 4× (suspension)	Report	3× (yellow card) 1× (suspension)	Zlatorog Arena, Celje; Attendance: 100; Referees: Praštalo, Todorović (BIH)

27 July 2017; 19:00	Croatia	35–14	Macedonia	Zlatorog Arena, Celje; Attendance: 55; Referees: Christidi, Papamattheou (GRE)
27 July 2017; 19:00	Japundža 6	(14–3)	Gichevska 6	Zlatorog Arena, Celje; Attendance: 55; Referees: Christidi, Papamattheou (GRE)
27 July 2017; 19:00	2× (yellow card) 3× (suspension)	Report	1× (yellow card) 4× (suspension)	Zlatorog Arena, Celje; Attendance: 55; Referees: Christidi, Papamattheou (GRE)

28 July 2017; 17:00	Macedonia	15–42	Russia	Zlatorog Arena, Celje; Attendance: 100; Referees: Kjær, Pedersen (DEN)
28 July 2017; 17:00	Gichevska 6	(9–20)	Skorobogatchenko 6	Zlatorog Arena, Celje; Attendance: 100; Referees: Kjær, Pedersen (DEN)
28 July 2017; 17:00	2× (yellow card) 2× (suspension)	Report	3× (yellow card) 5× (suspension)	Zlatorog Arena, Celje; Attendance: 100; Referees: Kjær, Pedersen (DEN)

28 July 2017; 19:00	Norway	25–20	Croatia	Zlatorog Arena, Celje; Attendance: 44; Referees: Freitas, Carvalho (POR)
28 July 2017; 19:00	Reistad 5	(13–12)	Japundža 6	Zlatorog Arena, Celje; Attendance: 44; Referees: Freitas, Carvalho (POR)
28 July 2017; 19:00	1× (yellow card) 3× (suspension)	Report	3× (yellow card) 3× (suspension)	Zlatorog Arena, Celje; Attendance: 44; Referees: Freitas, Carvalho (POR)

30 July 2017; 17:00	Russia	30–20	Croatia	Zlatorog Arena, Celje; Attendance: 100; Referees: Vujačić, Kažanegra (MNE)
30 July 2017; 17:00	Skorobogatchenko 7	(13–8)	Kalčić, Mikolić 5	Zlatorog Arena, Celje; Attendance: 100; Referees: Vujačić, Kažanegra (MNE)
30 July 2017; 17:00	3× (yellow card) 6× (suspension)	Report	2× (yellow card) 3× (suspension)	Zlatorog Arena, Celje; Attendance: 100; Referees: Vujačić, Kažanegra (MNE)

30 July 2017; 19:00	Norway	40–20	Macedonia	Zlatorog Arena, Celje; Attendance: 50; Referees: Lindenbaum, Laron (ISR)
30 July 2017; 19:00	Ellertsen 7	(19–9)	Bozinovska 6	Zlatorog Arena, Celje; Attendance: 50; Referees: Lindenbaum, Laron (ISR)
30 July 2017; 19:00	2× (yellow card) 3× (suspension)	Report	6× (suspension)	Zlatorog Arena, Celje; Attendance: 50; Referees: Lindenbaum, Laron (ISR)

=== Group C ===
Pos	Team	Pld	W	D	L	GF	GA	GD	Pts	Qualification
1	France	3	3	0	0	87	69	+18	6	Main round
2	Germany	3	2	0	1	70	64	+6	4	Main round
3	Spain	3	1	0	2	79	76	+3	2	Intermediate round
4	Serbia	3	0	0	3	59	86	−27	0	Intermediate round

Source: EHF
Rules for classification: 1) points; 2) head-to-head points; 3) head-to-head goal difference; 4) head-to-head goals scored; 5) goal difference; 6) goals scored; 7) draw.

27 July 2017; 13:00	Spain	20–21	Germany	Golovec Hall, Celje; Attendance: 106; Referees: Ilieva, Karbeska (MKD)
27 July 2017; 13:00	Cesáreo 5	(9–11)	three players 4	Golovec Hall, Celje; Attendance: 106; Referees: Ilieva, Karbeska (MKD)
27 July 2017; 13:00	3× (yellow card) 4× (suspension)	Report	3× (yellow card) 7× (suspension)	Golovec Hall, Celje; Attendance: 106; Referees: Ilieva, Karbeska (MKD)

27 July 2017; 15:00	France	26–21	Serbia	Golovec Hall, Celje; Attendance: 100; Referees: Lindenbaum, Laron (ISR)
27 July 2017; 15:00	Mauny 7	(10–12)	Cvijić 6	Golovec Hall, Celje; Attendance: 100; Referees: Lindenbaum, Laron (ISR)
27 July 2017; 15:00	2× (yellow card) 5× (suspension)	Report	2× (yellow card) 4× (suspension)	Golovec Hall, Celje; Attendance: 100; Referees: Lindenbaum, Laron (ISR)

28 July 2017; 13:00	Serbia	18–34	Spain	Golovec Hall, Celje; Attendance: 80; Referees: Bennani, Bennani (SWE)
28 July 2017; 13:00	Cvijić 5	(11–15)	González 8	Golovec Hall, Celje; Attendance: 80; Referees: Bennani, Bennani (SWE)
28 July 2017; 13:00	3× (yellow card) 6× (suspension)	Report	4× (yellow card) 2× (suspension)	Golovec Hall, Celje; Attendance: 80; Referees: Bennani, Bennani (SWE)

28 July 2017; 15:00	Germany	23–24	France	Golovec Hall, Celje; Attendance: 100; Referees: Năstase, Stancu (ROU)
28 July 2017; 15:00	Maidhof 4	(10–14)	Blonbou 6	Golovec Hall, Celje; Attendance: 100; Referees: Năstase, Stancu (ROU)
28 July 2017; 15:00	3× (yellow card) 3× (suspension)	Report	3× (yellow card) 4× (suspension)	Golovec Hall, Celje; Attendance: 100; Referees: Năstase, Stancu (ROU)

30 July 2017; 13:00	Spain	25–37	France	Golovec Hall, Celje; Attendance: 200; Referees: Ilieva, Karbeska (MKD)
30 July 2017; 13:00	Vegué 8	(14–16)	Blonbou 10	Golovec Hall, Celje; Attendance: 200; Referees: Ilieva, Karbeska (MKD)
30 July 2017; 13:00	4× (yellow card) 1× (suspension)	Report	4× (yellow card) 4× (suspension)	Golovec Hall, Celje; Attendance: 200; Referees: Ilieva, Karbeska (MKD)

30 July 2017; 15:00	Germany	26–20	Serbia	Golovec Hall, Celje; Attendance: 200; Referees: Christidi, Papamattheou (GRE)
30 July 2017; 15:00	Bayerl 6	(10–10)	Cvijić 7	Golovec Hall, Celje; Attendance: 200; Referees: Christidi, Papamattheou (GRE)
30 July 2017; 15:00	2× (yellow card) 7× (suspension) 1× (red card)	Report	3× (yellow card) 7× (suspension) 1× (red card)	Golovec Hall, Celje; Attendance: 200; Referees: Christidi, Papamattheou (GRE)

=== Group D ===
Pos	Team	Pld	W	D	L	GF	GA	GD	Pts	Qualification
1	Denmark	3	3	0	0	84	54	+30	6	Main round
2	Montenegro	3	2	0	1	63	58	+5	4	Main round
3	Slovenia (H)	3	1	0	2	65	68	−3	2	Intermediate round
4	Portugal	3	0	0	3	49	81	−32	0	Intermediate round

Source: EHF
Rules for classification: 1) points; 2) head-to-head points; 3) head-to-head goal difference; 4) head-to-head goals scored; 5) goal difference; 6) goals scored; 7) draw.
(H) Hosts

27 July 2017; 17:00	Denmark	32–16	Portugal	Golovec Hall, Celje; Attendance: 200; Referees: Bennani, Bennani (SWE)
27 July 2017; 17:00	three players 5	(16–8)	Moreno 6	Golovec Hall, Celje; Attendance: 200; Referees: Bennani, Bennani (SWE)
27 July 2017; 17:00	3× (yellow card) 1× (suspension)	Report	4× (yellow card) 2× (suspension) 1× (red card)	Golovec Hall, Celje; Attendance: 200; Referees: Bennani, Bennani (SWE)

27 July 2017; 19:00	Slovenia	17–24	Montenegro	Golovec Hall, Celje; Attendance: 500; Referees: Năstase, Stancu (ROU)
27 July 2017; 19:00	Baruca 4	(8–9)	Brnović 6	Golovec Hall, Celje; Attendance: 500; Referees: Năstase, Stancu (ROU)
27 July 2017; 19:00	3× (yellow card) 3× (suspension)	Report	3× (yellow card) 5× (suspension)	Golovec Hall, Celje; Attendance: 500; Referees: Năstase, Stancu (ROU)

28 July 2017; 17:00	Montenegro	18–26	Denmark	Golovec Hall, Celje; Attendance: 100; Referees: Lindenbaum, Laron (ISR)
28 July 2017; 17:00	Jovićević 6	(10–14)	Jørgensen 7	Golovec Hall, Celje; Attendance: 100; Referees: Lindenbaum, Laron (ISR)
28 July 2017; 17:00	3× (yellow card) 1× (suspension)	Report	2× (yellow card) 5× (suspension)	Golovec Hall, Celje; Attendance: 100; Referees: Lindenbaum, Laron (ISR)

28 July 2017; 19:00	Portugal	18–28	Slovenia	Golovec Hall, Celje; Attendance: 500; Referees: Ilieva, Karbeska (MKD)
28 July 2017; 19:00	Minciună 7	(10–15)	Akalović, Strnad 6	Golovec Hall, Celje; Attendance: 500; Referees: Ilieva, Karbeska (MKD)
28 July 2017; 19:00	3× (yellow card) 3× (suspension)	Report	3× (yellow card) 4× (suspension)	Golovec Hall, Celje; Attendance: 500; Referees: Ilieva, Karbeska (MKD)

30 July 2017; 17:00	Portugal	15–21	Montenegro	Golovec Hall, Celje; Attendance: 110; Referees: Praštalo, Todorović (BIH)
30 July 2017; 17:00	Oliveira 7	(6–8)	Brnović 7	Golovec Hall, Celje; Attendance: 110; Referees: Praštalo, Todorović (BIH)
30 July 2017; 17:00	3× (yellow card) 5× (suspension)	Report	3× (yellow card) 3× (suspension)	Golovec Hall, Celje; Attendance: 110; Referees: Praštalo, Todorović (BIH)

30 July 2017; 19:00	Denmark	26–20	Slovenia	Golovec Hall, Celje; Attendance: 732; Referees: Năstase, Stancu (ROU)
30 July 2017; 19:00	Ellebæk, Hougaard 4	(16–11)	Vučko 8	Golovec Hall, Celje; Attendance: 732; Referees: Năstase, Stancu (ROU)
30 July 2017; 19:00	3× (yellow card) 5× (suspension)	Report	2× (yellow card) 2× (suspension)	Golovec Hall, Celje; Attendance: 732; Referees: Năstase, Stancu (ROU)

== Intermediate round ==
=== Group III ===
Pos	Team	Pld	W	D	L	GF	GA	GD	Pts	Qualification
1	Romania	3	3	0	0	84	67	+17	6	9–12th place semifinals
2	Sweden	3	2	0	1	86	63	+23	4	9–12th place semifinals
3	Croatia	3	1	0	2	80	66	+14	2	13–16th place semifinals
4	Macedonia	3	0	0	3	50	104	−54	0	13–16th place semifinals

Source: EHF
Rules for classification: 1) points; 2) head-to-head points; 3) head-to-head goal difference; 4) head-to-head goals scored; 5) goal difference; 6) goals scored; 7) draw.

1 August 2017; 13:00	Sweden	40–15	Macedonia	Zlatorog Arena, Celje; Attendance: 80; Referees: Vujačić, Kažanegra (MNE)
1 August 2017; 13:00	Holmberg 7	(16–5)	Gichevska 8	Zlatorog Arena, Celje; Attendance: 80; Referees: Vujačić, Kažanegra (MNE)
1 August 2017; 13:00	1× (yellow card) 3× (suspension)	Report	2× (yellow card) 3× (suspension)	Zlatorog Arena, Celje; Attendance: 80; Referees: Vujačić, Kažanegra (MNE)

1 August 2017; 15:00	Romania	29–23	Croatia	Zlatorog Arena, Celje; Attendance: 50; Referees: Lindenbaum, Laron (ISR)
1 August 2017; 15:00	Tecar 7	(13–13)	Lukić 7	Zlatorog Arena, Celje; Attendance: 50; Referees: Lindenbaum, Laron (ISR)
1 August 2017; 15:00	2× (yellow card) 4× (suspension)	Report	1× (yellow card) 6× (suspension)	Zlatorog Arena, Celje; Attendance: 50; Referees: Lindenbaum, Laron (ISR)

2 August 2017; 13:00	Macedonia	21–29	Romania	Zlatorog Arena, Celje; Attendance: 50; Referees: Kjær, Pedersen (DEN)
2 August 2017; 13:00	Gichevska 6	(10–17)	Tîrcă 9	Zlatorog Arena, Celje; Attendance: 50; Referees: Kjær, Pedersen (DEN)
2 August 2017; 13:00	2× (yellow card) 5× (suspension)	Report	1× (yellow card) 3× (suspension)	Zlatorog Arena, Celje; Attendance: 50; Referees: Kjær, Pedersen (DEN)

2 August 2017; 15:00	Croatia	22–23	Sweden	Zlatorog Arena, Celje; Attendance: 166; Referees: Freitas, Carvalho (POR)
2 August 2017; 15:00	Japundža 5	(14–10)	Larsson 9	Zlatorog Arena, Celje; Attendance: 166; Referees: Freitas, Carvalho (POR)
2 August 2017; 15:00	2× (yellow card) 2× (suspension)	Report	2× (yellow card) 4× (suspension)	Zlatorog Arena, Celje; Attendance: 166; Referees: Freitas, Carvalho (POR)

=== Group IV ===
Pos	Team	Pld	W	D	L	GF	GA	GD	Pts	Qualification
1	Spain	3	3	0	0	88	63	+25	6	9–12th place semifinals
2	Slovenia (H)	3	2	0	1	80	65	+15	4	9–12th place semifinals
3	Portugal	3	1	0	2	65	79	−14	2	13–16th place semifinals
4	Serbia	3	0	0	3	62	88	−26	0	13–16th place semifinals

Source: EHF
Rules for classification: 1) points; 2) head-to-head points; 3) head-to-head goal difference; 4) head-to-head goals scored; 5) goal difference; 6) goals scored; 7) draw.
(H) Hosts

1 August 2017; 13:00	Serbia	22–25	Portugal	Golovec Hall, Celje; Attendance: 100; Referees: Praštalo, Todorović (BIH)
1 August 2017; 13:00	Cvijić 8	(11–10)	Oliveira 8	Golovec Hall, Celje; Attendance: 100; Referees: Praštalo, Todorović (BIH)
1 August 2017; 13:00	4× (yellow card) 6× (suspension)	Report	3× (yellow card) 4× (suspension)	Golovec Hall, Celje; Attendance: 100; Referees: Praštalo, Todorović (BIH)

1 August 2017; 15:00	Spain	25–23	Slovenia	Golovec Hall, Celje; Attendance: 166; Referees: Kjær, Pedersen (DEN)
1 August 2017; 15:00	Mbengue 5	(15–12)	Strnad 7	Golovec Hall, Celje; Attendance: 166; Referees: Kjær, Pedersen (DEN)
1 August 2017; 15:00	3× (yellow card) 2× (suspension)	Report	2× (yellow card) 3× (suspension) 1× (red card)	Golovec Hall, Celje; Attendance: 166; Referees: Kjær, Pedersen (DEN)

2 August 2017; 13:00	Portugal	22–29	Spain	Golovec Hall, Celje; Attendance: 50; Referees: Christidi, Papamattheou (GRE)
2 August 2017; 13:00	Monteiro, Oliveira 8	(13–15)	Vegué 6	Golovec Hall, Celje; Attendance: 50; Referees: Christidi, Papamattheou (GRE)
2 August 2017; 13:00	1× (yellow card) 5× (suspension)	Report	2× (yellow card) 1× (suspension) 1× (red card)	Golovec Hall, Celje; Attendance: 50; Referees: Christidi, Papamattheou (GRE)

2 August 2017; 15:00	Slovenia	29–22	Serbia	Golovec Hall, Celje; Attendance: 100; Referees: Vujačić, Kažanegra (MNE)
2 August 2017; 15:00	Akalović 5	(16–8)	Cvijić 11	Golovec Hall, Celje; Attendance: 100; Referees: Vujačić, Kažanegra (MNE)
2 August 2017; 15:00	1× (yellow card) 3× (suspension)	Report	3× (yellow card) 1× (suspension)	Golovec Hall, Celje; Attendance: 100; Referees: Vujačić, Kažanegra (MNE)

== Main round ==
=== Group I ===
Pos	Team	Pld	W	D	L	GF	GA	GD	Pts	Qualification
1	Hungary	3	3	0	0	87	68	+19	6	Semifinals
2	Russia	3	2	0	1	72	62	+10	4	Semifinals
3	Norway	3	1	0	2	65	78	−13	2	5–8th place semifinals
4	Netherlands	3	0	0	3	75	91	−16	0	5–8th place semifinals

Source: EHF
Rules for classification: 1) points; 2) head-to-head points; 3) head-to-head goal difference; 4) head-to-head goals scored; 5) goal difference; 6) goals scored; 7) draw.

1 August 2017; 17:00	Netherlands	29–32	Norway	Zlatorog Arena, Celje; Attendance: 100; Referees: Ilieva, Karbeska (MKD)
1 August 2017; 17:00	Freriks 10	(16–18)	Reistad 11	Zlatorog Arena, Celje; Attendance: 100; Referees: Ilieva, Karbeska (MKD)
1 August 2017; 17:00	3× (yellow card) 1× (suspension)	Report	3× (yellow card) 5× (suspension)	Zlatorog Arena, Celje; Attendance: 100; Referees: Ilieva, Karbeska (MKD)

1 August 2017; 19:00	Hungary	27–24	Russia	Zlatorog Arena, Celje; Attendance: 200; Referees: Bennani, Bennani (SWE)
1 August 2017; 19:00	Klujber 10	(15–14)	Skorobogatchenko 8	Zlatorog Arena, Celje; Attendance: 200; Referees: Bennani, Bennani (SWE)
1 August 2017; 19:00	1× (yellow card) 5× (suspension)	Report	2× (yellow card) 6× (suspension)	Zlatorog Arena, Celje; Attendance: 200; Referees: Bennani, Bennani (SWE)

2 August 2017; 17:00	Norway	18–26	Hungary	Zlatorog Arena, Celje; Attendance: 200; Referees: Năstase, Stancu (ROU)
2 August 2017; 17:00	Reistad 5	(8–15)	Hornyák 6	Zlatorog Arena, Celje; Attendance: 200; Referees: Năstase, Stancu (ROU)
2 August 2017; 17:00	2× (yellow card) 2× (suspension)	Report	2× (yellow card) 1× (suspension)	Zlatorog Arena, Celje; Attendance: 200; Referees: Năstase, Stancu (ROU)

2 August 2017; 19:00	Russia	25–20	Netherlands	Zlatorog Arena, Celje; Attendance: 200; Referees: Praštalo, Todorović (BIH)
2 August 2017; 19:00	Skorobogatchenko 6	(14–11)	Drent 5	Zlatorog Arena, Celje; Attendance: 200; Referees: Praštalo, Todorović (BIH)
2 August 2017; 19:00	3× (yellow card) 5× (suspension)	Report	3× (yellow card) 6× (suspension)	Zlatorog Arena, Celje; Attendance: 200; Referees: Praštalo, Todorović (BIH)

=== Group II ===
Pos	Team	Pld	W	D	L	GF	GA	GD	Pts	Qualification
1	Denmark	3	3	0	0	75	64	+11	6	Semifinals
2	France	3	2	0	1	77	68	+9	4	Semifinals
3	Montenegro	3	1	0	2	63	77	−14	2	5–8th place semifinals
4	Germany	3	0	0	3	67	73	−6	0	5–8th place semifinals

Source: EHF
Rules for classification: 1) points; 2) head-to-head points; 3) head-to-head goal difference; 4) head-to-head goals scored; 5) goal difference; 6) goals scored; 7) draw.

1 August 2017; 17:00	Germany	23–27	Montenegro	Golovec Hall, Celje; Attendance: 70; Referees: Năstase, Stancu (ROU)
1 August 2017; 17:00	Stuttfeld, Zschocke 5	(12–12)	Konatar 8	Golovec Hall, Celje; Attendance: 70; Referees: Năstase, Stancu (ROU)
1 August 2017; 17:00	3× (yellow card) 4× (suspension)	Report	7× (suspension) 1× (red card)	Golovec Hall, Celje; Attendance: 70; Referees: Năstase, Stancu (ROU)

1 August 2017; 19:00	France	25–27	Denmark	Golovec Hall, Celje; Attendance: 160; Referees: Freitas, Carvalho (POR)
1 August 2017; 19:00	Blonbou 6	(14–15)	Friis 7	Golovec Hall, Celje; Attendance: 160; Referees: Freitas, Carvalho (POR)
1 August 2017; 19:00	2× (yellow card) 2× (suspension)	Report	2× (yellow card) 4× (suspension)	Golovec Hall, Celje; Attendance: 160; Referees: Freitas, Carvalho (POR)

2 August 2017; 17:00	Montenegro	18–28	France	Golovec Hall, Celje; Attendance: 50; Referees: Ilieva, Karbeska (MKD)
2 August 2017; 17:00	Čarapić, Jovićević 5	(11–21)	Blonbou, Ekoh 6	Golovec Hall, Celje; Attendance: 50; Referees: Ilieva, Karbeska (MKD)
2 August 2017; 17:00	3× (yellow card) 2× (suspension)	Report	2× (yellow card)	Golovec Hall, Celje; Attendance: 50; Referees: Ilieva, Karbeska (MKD)

2 August 2017; 19:00	Denmark	22–21	Germany	Golovec Hall, Celje; Attendance: 500; Referees: Bennani, Bennani (SWE)
2 August 2017; 19:00	Stougaard 8	(14–6)	Peter 5	Golovec Hall, Celje; Attendance: 500; Referees: Bennani, Bennani (SWE)
2 August 2017; 19:00	2× (yellow card) 4× (suspension)	Report	4× (suspension)	Golovec Hall, Celje; Attendance: 500; Referees: Bennani, Bennani (SWE)

== Final round ==
=== Bracket ===
Championship bracket

Semifinals
4 August
Hungary	26
France	31
4 August
Denmark	27
Russia	28

Final
6 August
France	31
Russia	26
Third place
6 August
Hungary	26
Denmark	28

9th place bracket

9–12th place semifinals
4 August
Romania	26
Slovenia	17
4 August
Spain	21
Sweden	27

9th place
5 August
Romania	32
Sweden	30
11th place
5 August
Slovenia	28
Spain	29

5th place bracket

5–8th place semifinals
4 August
Norway	28
Germany (ET)	31
4 August
Montenegro	25
Netherlands	29

5th place
6 August
Germany	27
Netherlands	26
7th place
6 August
Norway	28
Montenegro	23

13th place bracket

13–16th place semifinals
4 August
Croatia	27
Serbia	18
4 August
Portugal	35
Macedonia	22

13th place
5 August
Croatia	32
Portugal	22
15th place
5 August
Serbia	24
Macedonia	21

=== 13–16th place semifinals ===
4 August 2017; 12:00	Croatia	27–18	Serbia	Golovec Hall, Celje; Attendance: 50; Referees: Lindenbaum, Laron (ISR)
4 August 2017; 12:00	Mrazović 8	(13–8)	Cvijić 4	Golovec Hall, Celje; Attendance: 50; Referees: Lindenbaum, Laron (ISR)
4 August 2017; 12:00	1× (yellow card) 3× (suspension)	Report	3× (yellow card) 5× (suspension)	Golovec Hall, Celje; Attendance: 50; Referees: Lindenbaum, Laron (ISR)

4 August 2017; 14:30	Portugal	35–22	Macedonia	Golovec Hall, Celje; Attendance: 56; Referees: Praštalo, Todorović (BIH)
4 August 2017; 14:30	Minciună 11	(17–12)	Bozinovska 6	Golovec Hall, Celje; Attendance: 56; Referees: Praštalo, Todorović (BIH)
4 August 2017; 14:30	3× (yellow card) 2× (suspension)	Report	3× (yellow card) 4× (suspension)	Golovec Hall, Celje; Attendance: 56; Referees: Praštalo, Todorović (BIH)

=== 9–12th place semifinals ===
4 August 2017; 17:00	Romania	26–17	Slovenia	Golovec Hall, Celje; Attendance: 200; Referees: Bennani, Bennani (SWE)
4 August 2017; 17:00	Tîrcă 8	(13–12)	Helbel 5	Golovec Hall, Celje; Attendance: 200; Referees: Bennani, Bennani (SWE)
4 August 2017; 17:00	4× (yellow card) 3× (suspension)	Report	2× (yellow card) 2× (suspension)	Golovec Hall, Celje; Attendance: 200; Referees: Bennani, Bennani (SWE)

4 August 2017; 19:30	Spain	21–27	Sweden	Golovec Hall, Celje; Attendance: 88; Referees: Vujačić, Kažanegra (MNE)
4 August 2017; 19:30	Zarco 9	(11–12)	Lerby 6	Golovec Hall, Celje; Attendance: 88; Referees: Vujačić, Kažanegra (MNE)
4 August 2017; 19:30	2× (yellow card) 3× (suspension)	Report	2× (yellow card) 1× (suspension)	Golovec Hall, Celje; Attendance: 88; Referees: Vujačić, Kažanegra (MNE)

=== 5–8th place semifinals ===
4 August 2017
12:00
Norway
28–31 (ET)
Germany
Zlatorog Arena, Celje
Attendance: 100
Referees: Kjær, Pedersen (DEN)
Lund 9
(13–10)
Maidhof 12
2× (yellow card) 3× (suspension)
Report
1× (yellow card) 2× (suspension)

FT: 23–23 ET: 5–8

4 August 2017; 14:30	Montenegro	25–29	Netherlands	Zlatorog Arena, Celje; Attendance: 200; Referees: Christidi, Papamattheou (GRE)
4 August 2017; 14:30	Jovićević 7	(11–14)	Housheer 9	Zlatorog Arena, Celje; Attendance: 200; Referees: Christidi, Papamattheou (GRE)
4 August 2017; 14:30	2× (yellow card) 4× (suspension)	Report	1× (yellow card) 3× (suspension)	Zlatorog Arena, Celje; Attendance: 200; Referees: Christidi, Papamattheou (GRE)

=== Semifinals ===
4 August 2017; 19:30	Denmark	27–28	Russia	Zlatorog Arena, Celje; Attendance: 500; Referees: Năstase, Stancu (ROU)
4 August 2017; 19:30	Jørgensen 9	(15–13)	Shaposhnikova, Skorobogatchenko 5	Zlatorog Arena, Celje; Attendance: 500; Referees: Năstase, Stancu (ROU)
4 August 2017; 19:30	3× (yellow card) 3× (suspension)	Report	2× (yellow card)	Zlatorog Arena, Celje; Attendance: 500; Referees: Năstase, Stancu (ROU)

4 August 2017; 17:00	Hungary	26–31	France	Zlatorog Arena, Celje; Attendance: 300; Referees: Freitas, Carvalho (POR)
4 August 2017; 17:00	Háfra 7	(13–15)	Blonbou 9	Zlatorog Arena, Celje; Attendance: 300; Referees: Freitas, Carvalho (POR)
4 August 2017; 17:00	2× (yellow card)	Report	4× (yellow card) 2× (suspension)	Zlatorog Arena, Celje; Attendance: 300; Referees: Freitas, Carvalho (POR)

=== 15th place game ===
5 August 2017; 12:00	Serbia	24–21	Macedonia	Zlatorog Arena, Celje; Attendance: 50; Referees: Freitas, Carvalho (POR)
5 August 2017; 12:00	Radović 5	(12–10)	Bozinovska 7	Zlatorog Arena, Celje; Attendance: 50; Referees: Freitas, Carvalho (POR)
5 August 2017; 12:00	1× (yellow card) 4× (suspension)	Report	3× (yellow card) 5× (suspension) 1× (red card)	Zlatorog Arena, Celje; Attendance: 50; Referees: Freitas, Carvalho (POR)

=== 13th place game ===
5 August 2017; 14:30	Croatia	32–22	Portugal	Zlatorog Arena, Celje; Attendance: 100; Referees: Lindenbaum, Laron (ISR)
5 August 2017; 14:30	Mrazović 9	(17–9)	Moreno 6	Zlatorog Arena, Celje; Attendance: 100; Referees: Lindenbaum, Laron (ISR)
5 August 2017; 14:30	1× (yellow card) 3× (suspension)	Report	3× (yellow card) 4× (suspension)	Zlatorog Arena, Celje; Attendance: 100; Referees: Lindenbaum, Laron (ISR)

=== Eleventh place game ===
5 August 2017; 17:00	Slovenia	28–29	Spain	Zlatorog Arena, Celje; Attendance: 200; Referees: Christidi, Papamattheou (GRE)
5 August 2017; 17:00	Vučko 7	(15–18)	Mbengue 5	Zlatorog Arena, Celje; Attendance: 200; Referees: Christidi, Papamattheou (GRE)
5 August 2017; 17:00	1× (yellow card) 2× (suspension)	Report	3× (yellow card) 2× (suspension)	Zlatorog Arena, Celje; Attendance: 200; Referees: Christidi, Papamattheou (GRE)

=== Ninth place game ===
5 August 2017; 19:30	Romania	32–30	Sweden	Zlatorog Arena, Celje; Attendance: 100; Referees: Kjær, Pedersen (DEN)
5 August 2017; 19:30	Tîrcă 12	(19–12)	Lerby 5	Zlatorog Arena, Celje; Attendance: 100; Referees: Kjær, Pedersen (DEN)
5 August 2017; 19:30	1× (yellow card) 3× (suspension)	Report	2× (yellow card) 4× (suspension)	Zlatorog Arena, Celje; Attendance: 100; Referees: Kjær, Pedersen (DEN)

=== Seventh place game ===
6 August 2017; 10:00	Norway	28–23	Montenegro	Zlatorog Arena, Celje; Attendance: 50; Referees: Kjær, Pedersen (DEN)
6 August 2017; 10:00	Lund 6	(14–13)	Brnović, Konatar 5	Zlatorog Arena, Celje; Attendance: 50; Referees: Kjær, Pedersen (DEN)
6 August 2017; 10:00		Report	1× (yellow card) 2× (suspension)	Zlatorog Arena, Celje; Attendance: 50; Referees: Kjær, Pedersen (DEN)

=== Fifth place game ===
6 August 2017; 12:30	Germany	27–26	Netherlands	Zlatorog Arena, Celje; Attendance: 150; Referees: Bennani, Bennani (SWE)
6 August 2017; 12:30	Degenhardt, Maidhof 6	(11–16)	van Wetering 7	Zlatorog Arena, Celje; Attendance: 150; Referees: Bennani, Bennani (SWE)
6 August 2017; 12:30	2× (yellow card) 7× (suspension) 1× (red card)	Report	2× (yellow card) 4× (suspension)	Zlatorog Arena, Celje; Attendance: 150; Referees: Bennani, Bennani (SWE)

=== Third place game ===
6 August 2017; 15:00	Hungary	26–28	Denmark	Zlatorog Arena, Celje; Attendance: 266; Referees: Ilieva, Karbeska (MKD)
6 August 2017; 15:00	Háfra 9	(13–14)	Ellebæk, Jørgensen 8	Zlatorog Arena, Celje; Attendance: 266; Referees: Ilieva, Karbeska (MKD)
6 August 2017; 15:00	2× (yellow card) 3× (suspension)	Report	3× (yellow card) 1× (suspension)	Zlatorog Arena, Celje; Attendance: 266; Referees: Ilieva, Karbeska (MKD)

=== Final ===
6 August 2017; 17:30	France	31–26	Russia	Zlatorog Arena, Celje; Attendance: 500; Referees: Vujačić, Kažanegra (MNE)
6 August 2017; 17:30	Ekoh 7	(18–15)	Skorobogatchenko 8	Zlatorog Arena, Celje; Attendance: 500; Referees: Vujačić, Kažanegra (MNE)
6 August 2017; 17:30	3× (yellow card) 3× (suspension)	Report	2× (yellow card) 1× (suspension)	Zlatorog Arena, Celje; Attendance: 500; Referees: Vujačić, Kažanegra (MNE)

== Final ranking ==
Rank	Team
1st place, gold medalist(s)	France
2nd place, silver medalist(s)	Denmark
3rd place, bronze medalist(s)	Hungary
4	Germany
5	Netherlands
6	Norway
7	Montenegro
8	Romania
9	Sweden
10	Spain
11	Slovenia
12	Croatia
13	Portugal
14	Serbia
15	Macedonia
16	Russia

== Statistics and tournament awards ==
=== Top goalscorers ===
Rank	Name	Team	Goals
1	Sorina Tîrcă	Romania	56
2	Jannela Blonbou	France	47
3	Lidija Cvijić	Serbia	45
3	Antonina Skorobogatchenko	Russia	45
5	Dione Housheer	Netherlands	43
6	Katrin Klujber	Hungary	38
7	Merel Freriks	Netherlands	37
7	Noémi Háfra	Hungary	37
9	Karichma Ekoh	France	35
9	Diana Oliveira	Portugal	35

The all-star team and awards were announced on 6 August 2017.

=== All-star team ===
Position	Player
Goalkeeper	(Denmark) Amalie Milling
Right wing	(Hungary) Katrin Klujber
Right back	(France) Jannela Blonbou
Centre back	(Russia) Milana Tazhenova
Left back	(Norway) Henny Reistad
Left wing	(Netherlands) Bo van Wetering
Pivot	(Montenegro) Tatjana Brnović

=== Awards ===
Best defense player	(France) Charlotte Kieffer
Most valuable player	(Denmark) Kristina Jørgensen
Top scorer	(Romania) Sorina Tîrcă

2017 U-19 European Champions

France, first title

Team roster: Camille Depuiset, Roxanne Frank, Manuella Dos Reis, Ophélie Tonds, Constance Mauny, Karichma Ekoh, Soukeïna Sagna, Charlotte Kieffer, Claire Vautier, Méline Nocandy, Déborah Lassource, Pauline Plotton, Marie Fall, Mabana-Ma Fofana, Jannela Blonbou, Lisa Bruni, Melvine Deba
Head coach: Éric Baradat
