= 2018 Women's Junior World Handball Championship =

21st edition of the IHF Women's Junior World Championship

Tournament details
- Host country: Hungary
- Venues: 2 (in 1 host city)
- Dates: 1–14 July
- Teams: 23 (from 4 confederations)

Final positions
- Champions: Hungary (1st title)
- Runners-up: Norway
- Third place: South Korea
- Fourth place: Russia

Tournament statistics
- Matches played: 85
- Goals scored: 4,435 (52.18 per match)
- Top scorers: (Angola) Helena Paulo (73 goals)

Awards
- Best player: (South Korea) Song Hye-soo

The 2018 IHF Women's Junior World Championship was the 21st edition of the IHF Women's Junior World Championship that took place in Debrecen, Hungary from 1 to 14 July 2018.

Hungary won their first ever title by defeating Norway 28–22 in the final.

== Qualification ==
Qualification	Vacancies	Qualified
Host	1	Hungary
2016 Women's Youth World Handball Championship	1	Russia
2017 Asian Women's Junior Handball Championship	3	South Korea; China; Japan
2017 Women's Under-19 European Handball Championship	2	France; Denmark
2017 African Women's Junior Handball Championship	3	Angola; Egypt; Ivory Coast
2018 Pan American Women's Junior Handball Championship	3	Brazil; Chile; Paraguay
European qualification	11	Croatia; Germany; Iceland; Montenegro; Netherlands; Portugal; Romania; Slovenia; Spain; Sweden; Norway

== Venues ==
Matches will be played in Debrecen.

- Főnix Hall (6,500)
- Hódos Imre Sports Hall (2,000)

== Draw ==
The draw was held on 26 April 2018 at Basel, Switzerland.

=== Seeding ===
Pot 1	Pot 2	Pot 3	Pot 4	Pot 5	Pot 6
Russia; France; Denmark; Hungary	Germany; Netherlands; Norway; South Korea	Montenegro; Romania; Spain; Slovenia	Brazil; Croatia; Angola; China	Chile; Portugal; Egypt; Japan	Paraguay; Iceland; Ivory Coast; Sweden

== Preliminary round ==
All time are local (UTC+2).

=== Group A ===
Pos	Team	Pld	W	D	L	GF	GA	GD	Pts	Qualification
1	Hungary (H)	4	4	0	0	122	88	+34	8	Round of 16
2	Norway	4	3	0	1	117	97	+20	6	Round of 16
3	Montenegro	4	1	0	3	83	101	−18	2 (Note: Montenegro 2 Pts, +3 GD; Brazil 2 Pts, +3 GD, Portugal 2 Pts, −6 GD. Montenegro ahead because of more goals scored (46 to 35).)	Round of 16
4	Brazil	4	1	0	3	79	84	−5	2	Round of 16
5	Portugal	4	1	0	3	81	112	−31	2	
6	Ivory Coast (Note: Ivory Coast withdrew on 4 July 2018 after they were not able to travel to Hungary.)	0	0	0	0	0	0	0	0	Withdrawn

Source: IHF
Rules for classification: 1) Points; 2) Head-to-head points; 3) Head-to-head goal difference; 4) Head-to-head goals scored; 5) Goal difference; 6) Goals scored; 7) Draw.
(H) Hosts
Notes:

1 July 2018; 18:00	Hungary	27–24	Brazil	Főnix Hall, Debrecen; Attendance: 3,212; Referees: Álvarez, Bustamante (ESP)
1 July 2018; 18:00	Klujber 8	(11–10)	Dos Santos 6	Főnix Hall, Debrecen; Attendance: 3,212; Referees: Álvarez, Bustamante (ESP)
1 July 2018; 18:00	3× (yellow card) 6× (suspension)	Report	2× (yellow card) 4× (suspension)	Főnix Hall, Debrecen; Attendance: 3,212; Referees: Álvarez, Bustamante (ESP)

2 July 2018; 14:00	Montenegro	30–23	Portugal	Főnix Hall, Debrecen; Attendance: 232; Referees: Emam, Hedaia (EGY)
2 July 2018; 14:00	Đoković 7	(14–11)	Minciună 6	Főnix Hall, Debrecen; Attendance: 232; Referees: Emam, Hedaia (EGY)
2 July 2018; 14:00	7× (suspension)	Report	1× (yellow card) 4× (suspension)	Főnix Hall, Debrecen; Attendance: 232; Referees: Emam, Hedaia (EGY)

4 July 2018; 16:00	Brazil	20–25	Norway	Főnix Hall, Debrecen; Attendance: 300; Referees: Sosa, Lemes (URU)
4 July 2018; 16:00	Bitolo 7	(8–13)	Ellertsen, Reistad 5	Főnix Hall, Debrecen; Attendance: 300; Referees: Sosa, Lemes (URU)
4 July 2018; 16:00	1× (yellow card) 2× (suspension)	Report	2× (yellow card) 3× (suspension)	Főnix Hall, Debrecen; Attendance: 300; Referees: Sosa, Lemes (URU)

4 July 2018; 18:00	Portugal	20–33	Hungary	Főnix Hall, Debrecen; Attendance: 2,500; Referees: Antić, Jakovljević (SRB)
4 July 2018; 18:00	three players 4	(11–13)	Háfra 7	Főnix Hall, Debrecen; Attendance: 2,500; Referees: Antić, Jakovljević (SRB)
4 July 2018; 18:00	3× (yellow card) 6× (suspension)	Report	2× (yellow card) 1× (suspension) 1× (red card)	Főnix Hall, Debrecen; Attendance: 2,500; Referees: Antić, Jakovljević (SRB)

5 July 2018; 18:00	Norway	31–20	Montenegro	Főnix Hall, Debrecen; Attendance: 100; Referees: Álvarez, Bustamante (ESP)
5 July 2018; 18:00	Reistad 8	(15–10)	Đoković 9	Főnix Hall, Debrecen; Attendance: 100; Referees: Álvarez, Bustamante (ESP)
5 July 2018; 18:00	3× (yellow card) 4× (suspension)	Report	3× (yellow card) 1× (suspension)	Főnix Hall, Debrecen; Attendance: 100; Referees: Álvarez, Bustamante (ESP)

5 July 2018; 20:00	Brazil	15–16	Portugal	Főnix Hall, Debrecen; Attendance: 70; Referees: Al-Mawt, Al-Mahroon (BHR)
5 July 2018; 20:00	four players 3	(11–12)	Resende 7	Főnix Hall, Debrecen; Attendance: 70; Referees: Al-Mawt, Al-Mahroon (BHR)
5 July 2018; 20:00	2× (yellow card) 6× (suspension)	Report	2× (yellow card) 1× (suspension)	Főnix Hall, Debrecen; Attendance: 70; Referees: Al-Mawt, Al-Mahroon (BHR)

7 July 2018; 13:30	Montenegro	17–27	Hungary	Főnix Hall, Debrecen; Attendance: 3,000; Referees: Năstase, Stancu (ROU)
7 July 2018; 13:30	three players 3	(7–13)	Klujber, Tóvizi 5	Főnix Hall, Debrecen; Attendance: 3,000; Referees: Năstase, Stancu (ROU)
7 July 2018; 13:30	2× (yellow card) 3× (suspension)	Report	1× (yellow card) 2× (suspension)	Főnix Hall, Debrecen; Attendance: 3,000; Referees: Năstase, Stancu (ROU)

7 July 2018; 15:30	Norway	34–22	Portugal	Főnix Hall, Debrecen; Attendance: 200; Referees: Honda, Tabuchi (JPN)
7 July 2018; 15:30	Jacobsen 8	(15–10)	Minciună 8	Főnix Hall, Debrecen; Attendance: 200; Referees: Honda, Tabuchi (JPN)
7 July 2018; 15:30	1× (yellow card) 2× (suspension)	Report	2× (suspension)	Főnix Hall, Debrecen; Attendance: 200; Referees: Honda, Tabuchi (JPN)

8 July 2018; 18:00	Hungary	35–27	Norway	Főnix Hall, Debrecen; Attendance: 4,000; Referees: Sosa, Lemes (URU)
8 July 2018; 18:00	Klujber 10	(20–13)	Dahl 9	Főnix Hall, Debrecen; Attendance: 4,000; Referees: Sosa, Lemes (URU)
8 July 2018; 18:00	2× (yellow card) 1× (suspension)	Report	1× (yellow card) 4× (suspension)	Főnix Hall, Debrecen; Attendance: 4,000; Referees: Sosa, Lemes (URU)

8 July 2018; 20:00	Montenegro	16–20	Brazil	Főnix Hall, Debrecen; Attendance: 100; Referees: Emam, Hedaia (EGY)
8 July 2018; 20:00	Šaranović 4	(8–13)	Paizinho 6	Főnix Hall, Debrecen; Attendance: 100; Referees: Emam, Hedaia (EGY)
8 July 2018; 20:00	3× (yellow card) 4× (suspension)	Report	2× (yellow card) 2× (suspension)	Főnix Hall, Debrecen; Attendance: 100; Referees: Emam, Hedaia (EGY)

=== Group B ===
Pos	Team	Pld	W	D	L	GF	GA	GD	Pts	Qualification
1	Russia	5	5	0	0	153	88	+65	10	Round of 16
2	South Korea	5	3	1	1	140	127	+13	7 (Note: South Korea 29–29 Iceland)	Round of 16
3	Iceland	5	3	1	1	125	125	0	7	Round of 16
4	Slovenia	5	2	0	3	133	119	+14	4	Round of 16
5	Chile	5	1	0	4	109	145	−36	2	
6	China	5	0	0	5	112	168	−56	0	

Source: IHF
Rules for classification: 1) Points; 2) Head-to-head points; 3) Head-to-head goal difference; 4) Head-to-head goals scored; 5) Goal difference; 6) Goals scored; 7) Draw.
Notes:

2 July 2018; 16:00	Russia	35–16	China	Főnix Hall, Debrecen; Attendance: 100; Referees: Merz, Schilha (GER)
2 July 2018; 16:00	Koroleva 7	(15–3)	Zhou 6	Főnix Hall, Debrecen; Attendance: 100; Referees: Merz, Schilha (GER)
2 July 2018; 16:00	3× (yellow card) 2× (suspension)	Report	2× (yellow card) 4× (suspension)	Főnix Hall, Debrecen; Attendance: 100; Referees: Merz, Schilha (GER)

2 July 2018; 18:00	South Korea	29–29	Iceland	Főnix Hall, Debrecen; Attendance: 80; Referees: Năstase, Stancu (ROU)
2 July 2018; 18:00	Moon 8	(16–12)	Thompson 7	Főnix Hall, Debrecen; Attendance: 80; Referees: Năstase, Stancu (ROU)
2 July 2018; 18:00	3× (yellow card) 4× (suspension)	Report	3× (yellow card) 4× (suspension)	Főnix Hall, Debrecen; Attendance: 80; Referees: Năstase, Stancu (ROU)

2 July 2018; 20:00	Slovenia	33–20	Chile	Főnix Hall, Debrecen; Attendance: 40; Referees: Kulik, Nabokau (BLR)
2 July 2018; 20:00	Vončina 5	(16–8)	Gómez 5	Főnix Hall, Debrecen; Attendance: 40; Referees: Kulik, Nabokau (BLR)
2 July 2018; 20:00	3× (yellow card) 2× (suspension)	Report	1× (yellow card) 1× (suspension)	Főnix Hall, Debrecen; Attendance: 40; Referees: Kulik, Nabokau (BLR)

3 July 2018; 16:00	China	29–38	South Korea	Főnix Hall, Debrecen; Attendance: 150; Referees: Abid, Chaouch (TUN)
3 July 2018; 16:00	Zhou 7	(10–19)	Shin D. 11	Főnix Hall, Debrecen; Attendance: 150; Referees: Abid, Chaouch (TUN)
3 July 2018; 16:00	4× (suspension)	Report	2× (yellow card) 3× (suspension)	Főnix Hall, Debrecen; Attendance: 150; Referees: Abid, Chaouch (TUN)

3 July 2018; 18:00	Chile	19–32	Russia	Főnix Hall, Debrecen; Attendance: 150; Referees: Honda, Tabuchi (JPN)
3 July 2018; 18:00	Gómez, Moreno 5	(12–17)	Mikhaylichenko 6	Főnix Hall, Debrecen; Attendance: 150; Referees: Honda, Tabuchi (JPN)
3 July 2018; 18:00	1× (yellow card) 1× (suspension)	Report	2× (yellow card) 3× (suspension)	Főnix Hall, Debrecen; Attendance: 150; Referees: Honda, Tabuchi (JPN)

3 July 2018; 20:00	Iceland	24–22	Slovenia	Főnix Hall, Debrecen; Attendance: 151; Referees: Merz, Schilha (GER)
3 July 2018; 20:00	Thompson 9	(14–11)	Strnad 7	Főnix Hall, Debrecen; Attendance: 151; Referees: Merz, Schilha (GER)
3 July 2018; 20:00	1× (yellow card) 1× (suspension)	Report	3× (yellow card) 3× (suspension)	Főnix Hall, Debrecen; Attendance: 151; Referees: Merz, Schilha (GER)

5 July 2018; 10:00	Russia	32–14	Iceland	Főnix Hall, Debrecen; Attendance: 100; Referees: Emam, Hedaia (EGY)
5 July 2018; 10:00	Maslova 6	(15–6)	Erlingsdóttir, Valdimarsdóttir 3	Főnix Hall, Debrecen; Attendance: 100; Referees: Emam, Hedaia (EGY)
5 July 2018; 10:00	3× (yellow card) 2× (suspension)	Report	3× (yellow card)	Főnix Hall, Debrecen; Attendance: 100; Referees: Emam, Hedaia (EGY)

5 July 2018; 12:00	South Korea	24–21	Slovenia	Főnix Hall, Debrecen; Attendance: 100; Referees: Abid, Chaouch (TUN)
5 July 2018; 12:00	Shin D. 7	(15–11)	Vončina 4	Főnix Hall, Debrecen; Attendance: 100; Referees: Abid, Chaouch (TUN)
5 July 2018; 12:00	2× (yellow card) 3× (suspension)	Report	2× (yellow card) 2× (suspension)	Főnix Hall, Debrecen; Attendance: 100; Referees: Abid, Chaouch (TUN)

5 July 2018; 14:00	China	23–27	Chile	Főnix Hall, Debrecen; Attendance: 70; Referees: Hussein, Imran (IRQ)
5 July 2018; 14:00	Zhou 6	(17–12)	Gómez 9	Főnix Hall, Debrecen; Attendance: 70; Referees: Hussein, Imran (IRQ)
5 July 2018; 14:00	3× (yellow card) 3× (suspension)	Report	3× (yellow card) 1× (suspension)	Főnix Hall, Debrecen; Attendance: 70; Referees: Hussein, Imran (IRQ)

6 July 2018; 16:00	South Korea	34–21	Chile	Főnix Hall, Debrecen; Attendance: 70; Referees: Merz, Schilha (GER)
6 July 2018; 16:00	Shin D. 8	(16–10)	E. Ramírez 3	Főnix Hall, Debrecen; Attendance: 70; Referees: Merz, Schilha (GER)
6 July 2018; 16:00	3× (suspension)	Report	1× (yellow card) 4× (suspension)	Főnix Hall, Debrecen; Attendance: 70; Referees: Merz, Schilha (GER)

6 July 2018; 18:00	Slovenia	24–27	Russia	Főnix Hall, Debrecen; Attendance: 80; Referees: Antić, Jakovljević (SRB)
6 July 2018; 18:00	Lovšin 7	(10–11)	Mikhaylichenko 5	Főnix Hall, Debrecen; Attendance: 80; Referees: Antić, Jakovljević (SRB)
6 July 2018; 18:00	2× (yellow card) 5× (suspension)	Report	3× (yellow card) 5× (suspension)	Főnix Hall, Debrecen; Attendance: 80; Referees: Antić, Jakovljević (SRB)

6 July 2018; 20:00	Iceland	35–20	China	Főnix Hall, Debrecen; Attendance: 60; Referees: Al-Mawt, Al-Mahroon (BHR)
6 July 2018; 20:00	Erlingsdóttir 10	(18–9)	Wang 4	Főnix Hall, Debrecen; Attendance: 60; Referees: Al-Mawt, Al-Mahroon (BHR)
6 July 2018; 20:00	2× (yellow card) 2× (suspension)	Report	3× (yellow card) 3× (suspension)	Főnix Hall, Debrecen; Attendance: 60; Referees: Al-Mawt, Al-Mahroon (BHR)

8 July 2018; 10:00	Chile	22–23	Iceland	Főnix Hall, Debrecen; Attendance: 90; Referees: Abid, Chaouch (TUN)
8 July 2018; 10:00	Gómez 6	(11–11)	Thompson 7	Főnix Hall, Debrecen; Attendance: 90; Referees: Abid, Chaouch (TUN)
8 July 2018; 10:00	1× (yellow card) 3× (suspension)	Report	2× (yellow card) 6× (suspension) 1× (red card)	Főnix Hall, Debrecen; Attendance: 90; Referees: Abid, Chaouch (TUN)

8 July 2018; 12:00	Slovenia	33–24	China	Főnix Hall, Debrecen; Attendance: 100; Referees: Hatipoğlu, Şimşek (TUR)
8 July 2018; 12:00	Lovšin 6	(17–9)	Zhou 7	Főnix Hall, Debrecen; Attendance: 100; Referees: Hatipoğlu, Şimşek (TUR)
8 July 2018; 12:00	1× (yellow card) 2× (suspension)	Report	2× (yellow card) 3× (suspension)	Főnix Hall, Debrecen; Attendance: 100; Referees: Hatipoğlu, Şimşek (TUR)

8 July 2018; 14:00	Russia	27–15	South Korea	Főnix Hall, Debrecen; Attendance: 200; Referees: Álvarez, Bustamante (ESP)
8 July 2018; 14:00	Maslova 7	(14–10)	Song 5	Főnix Hall, Debrecen; Attendance: 200; Referees: Álvarez, Bustamante (ESP)
8 July 2018; 14:00	3× (yellow card) 2× (suspension)	Report	2× (yellow card) 3× (suspension)	Főnix Hall, Debrecen; Attendance: 200; Referees: Álvarez, Bustamante (ESP)

=== Group C ===
Pos	Team	Pld	W	D	L	GF	GA	GD	Pts	Qualification
1	Denmark	5	5	0	0	162	113	+49	10	Round of 16
2	Netherlands	5	3	1	1	171	132	+39	7	Round of 16
3	Romania	5	3	0	2	149	148	+1	6	Round of 16
4	Japan	5	2	1	2	152	144	+8	5	Round of 16
5	Angola	5	1	0	4	119	144	−25	2	
6	Paraguay	5	0	0	5	120	192	−72	0	

Source: IHF
Rules for classification: 1) Points; 2) Head-to-head points; 3) Head-to-head goal difference; 4) Head-to-head goals scored; 5) Goal difference; 6) Goals scored; 7) Draw.

2 July 2018; 10:00	Denmark	25–20	Angola	Hódos Imre Sports Hall, Debrecen; Referees: Rocha, Magalhães (BRA)
2 July 2018; 10:00	Friis 7	(14–10)	H. Paulo 14	Hódos Imre Sports Hall, Debrecen; Referees: Rocha, Magalhães (BRA)
2 July 2018; 10:00	3× (yellow card) 3× (suspension)	Report	1× (yellow card) 5× (suspension)	Hódos Imre Sports Hall, Debrecen; Referees: Rocha, Magalhães (BRA)

2 July 2018; 12:00	Netherlands	47–25	Paraguay	Hódos Imre Sports Hall, Debrecen; Referees: Kiyashko, Kiselev (RUS)
2 July 2018; 12:00	Housheer 9	(25–15)	Fernández 7	Hódos Imre Sports Hall, Debrecen; Referees: Kiyashko, Kiselev (RUS)
2 July 2018; 12:00	2× (yellow card) 7× (suspension)	Report	1× (yellow card) 3× (suspension)	Hódos Imre Sports Hall, Debrecen; Referees: Kiyashko, Kiselev (RUS)

2 July 2018; 14:00	Romania	32–30	Japan	Hódos Imre Sports Hall, Debrecen; Attendance: 315; Referees: Belkhiri, Hamidi (ALG)
2 July 2018; 14:00	Petruș, Popa 8	(15–17)	Yoshidome 7	Hódos Imre Sports Hall, Debrecen; Attendance: 315; Referees: Belkhiri, Hamidi (ALG)
2 July 2018; 14:00	4× (yellow card) 2× (suspension)	Report	2× (yellow card) 4× (suspension)	Hódos Imre Sports Hall, Debrecen; Attendance: 315; Referees: Belkhiri, Hamidi (ALG)

4 July 2018; 16:00	Paraguay	25–41	Romania	Hódos Imre Sports Hall, Debrecen; Attendance: 50; Referees: Hatipoğlu, Şimşek (TUR)
4 July 2018; 16:00	Insfrán 7	(13–16)	Berbece 10	Hódos Imre Sports Hall, Debrecen; Attendance: 50; Referees: Hatipoğlu, Şimşek (TUR)
4 July 2018; 16:00	3× (yellow card) 8× (suspension) 1× (red card)	Report	2× (yellow card) 1× (suspension)	Hódos Imre Sports Hall, Debrecen; Attendance: 50; Referees: Hatipoğlu, Şimşek (TUR)

4 July 2018; 18:00	Japan	23–33	Denmark	Hódos Imre Sports Hall, Debrecen; Attendance: 200; Referees: Álvarez, Bustamante (ESP)
4 July 2018; 18:00	Aizawa 5	(9–17)	Hylleberg 6	Hódos Imre Sports Hall, Debrecen; Attendance: 200; Referees: Álvarez, Bustamante (ESP)
4 July 2018; 18:00	2× (yellow card) 1× (suspension)	Report	2× (yellow card) 1× (suspension)	Hódos Imre Sports Hall, Debrecen; Attendance: 200; Referees: Álvarez, Bustamante (ESP)

4 July 2018; 20:00	Angola	21–37	Netherlands	Hódos Imre Sports Hall, Debrecen; Attendance: 232; Referees: Kulik, Nabokau (BLR)
4 July 2018; 20:00	H. Paulo 11	(10–19)	Housheer 10	Hódos Imre Sports Hall, Debrecen; Attendance: 232; Referees: Kulik, Nabokau (BLR)
4 July 2018; 20:00	1× (yellow card) 4× (suspension)	Report	3× (yellow card) 4× (suspension)	Hódos Imre Sports Hall, Debrecen; Attendance: 232; Referees: Kulik, Nabokau (BLR)

5 July 2018; 16:00	Denmark	37–23	Paraguay	Hódos Imre Sports Hall, Debrecen; Attendance: 220; Referees: Cheng, Zhou (CHN)
5 July 2018; 16:00	Lundgreen 7	(19–11)	Insfrán 9	Hódos Imre Sports Hall, Debrecen; Attendance: 220; Referees: Cheng, Zhou (CHN)
5 July 2018; 16:00	3× (yellow card) 4× (suspension)	Report	2× (yellow card) 3× (suspension)	Hódos Imre Sports Hall, Debrecen; Attendance: 220; Referees: Cheng, Zhou (CHN)

5 July 2018; 18:00	Netherlands	29–27	Romania	Hódos Imre Sports Hall, Debrecen; Attendance: 135; Referees: Rocha, Magalhães (BRA)
5 July 2018; 18:00	Housheer 12	(12–14)	Tîrcă 9	Hódos Imre Sports Hall, Debrecen; Attendance: 135; Referees: Rocha, Magalhães (BRA)
5 July 2018; 18:00	2× (yellow card) 9× (suspension) 1× (red card)	Report	2× (yellow card) 7× (suspension)	Hódos Imre Sports Hall, Debrecen; Attendance: 135; Referees: Rocha, Magalhães (BRA)

5 July 2018; 20:00	Angola	25–29	Japan	Hódos Imre Sports Hall, Debrecen; Attendance: 100; Referees: Hatipoğlu, Şimşek (TUR)
5 July 2018; 20:00	H. Paulo 11	(12–17)	Nakayama 7	Hódos Imre Sports Hall, Debrecen; Attendance: 100; Referees: Hatipoğlu, Şimşek (TUR)
5 July 2018; 20:00	2× (yellow card) 5× (suspension)	Report	2× (yellow card) 6× (suspension)	Hódos Imre Sports Hall, Debrecen; Attendance: 100; Referees: Hatipoğlu, Şimşek (TUR)

7 July 2018; 13:30	Netherlands	34–34	Japan	Hódos Imre Sports Hall, Debrecen; Attendance: 150; Referees: Emam, Heida (EGY)
7 July 2018; 13:30	Oostveen 9	(14–17)	Nakayama 14	Hódos Imre Sports Hall, Debrecen; Attendance: 150; Referees: Emam, Heida (EGY)
7 July 2018; 13:30	2× (yellow card) 4× (suspension)	Report	1× (yellow card) 2× (suspension)	Hódos Imre Sports Hall, Debrecen; Attendance: 150; Referees: Emam, Heida (EGY)

7 July 2018; 15:30	Romania	23–42	Denmark	Hódos Imre Sports Hall, Debrecen; Attendance: 200; Referees: Sosa, Lemes (URU)
7 July 2018; 15:30	Popescu 7	(8–20)	Lundgreen 8	Hódos Imre Sports Hall, Debrecen; Attendance: 200; Referees: Sosa, Lemes (URU)
7 July 2018; 15:30	2× (yellow card) 3× (suspension) 1× (red card)	Report	2× (yellow card) 5× (suspension)	Hódos Imre Sports Hall, Debrecen; Attendance: 200; Referees: Sosa, Lemes (URU)

7 July 2018; 17:30	Paraguay	27–31	Angola	Hódos Imre Sports Hall, Debrecen; Attendance: 120; Referees: Hussein, Imran (IRQ)
7 July 2018; 17:30	Insfrán 8	(14–18)	H. Paulo 11	Hódos Imre Sports Hall, Debrecen; Attendance: 120; Referees: Hussein, Imran (IRQ)
7 July 2018; 17:30	2× (yellow card) 3× (suspension)	Report	1× (yellow card) 6× (suspension)	Hódos Imre Sports Hall, Debrecen; Attendance: 120; Referees: Hussein, Imran (IRQ)

8 July 2018; 16:00	Japan	36–20	Paraguay	Hódos Imre Sports Hall, Debrecen; Attendance: 250; Referees: Hussein, Imran (IRQ)
8 July 2018; 16:00	Aizawa 7	(19–13)	Fernández 8	Hódos Imre Sports Hall, Debrecen; Attendance: 250; Referees: Hussein, Imran (IRQ)
8 July 2018; 16:00	2× (yellow card) 3× (suspension)	Report	1× (yellow card) 4× (suspension)	Hódos Imre Sports Hall, Debrecen; Attendance: 250; Referees: Hussein, Imran (IRQ)

8 July 2018; 18:00	Romania	26–22	Angola	Hódos Imre Sports Hall, Debrecen; Attendance: 100; Referees: Cheng, Zhou (CHN)
8 July 2018; 18:00	Tîrcă 8	(12–9)	H. Paulo 9	Hódos Imre Sports Hall, Debrecen; Attendance: 100; Referees: Cheng, Zhou (CHN)
8 July 2018; 18:00	3× (yellow card) 2× (suspension)	Report	1× (yellow card) 4× (suspension)	Hódos Imre Sports Hall, Debrecen; Attendance: 100; Referees: Cheng, Zhou (CHN)

8 July 2018; 20:00	Denmark	25–24	Netherlands	Hódos Imre Sports Hall, Debrecen; Attendance: 1,200; Referees: Merz, Schilha (GER)
8 July 2018; 20:00	Lundgreen 5	(14–15)	Housheer 8	Hódos Imre Sports Hall, Debrecen; Attendance: 1,200; Referees: Merz, Schilha (GER)
8 July 2018; 20:00	1× (yellow card) 3× (suspension)	Report	1× (yellow card) 5× (suspension)	Hódos Imre Sports Hall, Debrecen; Attendance: 1,200; Referees: Merz, Schilha (GER)

=== Group D ===
Pos	Team	Pld	W	D	L	GF	GA	GD	Pts	Qualification
1	France	5	5	0	0	129	98	+31	10	Round of 16
2	Croatia	5	3	0	2	109	101	+8	6 (Note: Croatia 22–18 Sweden)	Round of 16
3	Sweden	5	3	0	2	116	95	+21	6	Round of 16
4	Germany	5	2	0	3	144	110	+34	4 (Note: Germany 27–21 Spain)	Round of 16
5	Spain	5	2	0	3	130	122	+8	4	
6	Egypt	5	0	0	5	88	190	−102	0	

Source: IHF
Rules for classification: 1) Points; 2) Head-to-head points; 3) Head-to-head goal difference; 4) Head-to-head goals scored; 5) Goal difference; 6) Goals scored; 7) Draw.
Notes:

2 July 2018; 16:00	France	19–16	Croatia	Hódos Imre Sports Hall, Debrecen; Attendance: 300; Referees: Antić, Jakovljević (SRB)
2 July 2018; 16:00	Ekoh, Nocandy 4	(7–7)	Japundža 5	Hódos Imre Sports Hall, Debrecen; Attendance: 300; Referees: Antić, Jakovljević (SRB)
2 July 2018; 16:00	2× (yellow card) 2× (suspension)	Report	2× (yellow card) 6× (suspension) 1× (red card)	Hódos Imre Sports Hall, Debrecen; Attendance: 300; Referees: Antić, Jakovljević (SRB)

2 July 2018; 18:00	Germany	18–19	Sweden	Hódos Imre Sports Hall, Debrecen; Attendance: 200; Referees: Sosa, Lemes (URU)
2 July 2018; 18:00	Antl, Zschocke 5	(10–12)	Larsson 6	Hódos Imre Sports Hall, Debrecen; Attendance: 200; Referees: Sosa, Lemes (URU)
2 July 2018; 18:00	2× (yellow card) 5× (suspension)	Report	3× (yellow card) 6× (suspension)	Hódos Imre Sports Hall, Debrecen; Attendance: 200; Referees: Sosa, Lemes (URU)

2 July 2018; 20:00	Spain	39–20	Egypt	Hódos Imre Sports Hall, Debrecen; Attendance: 200; Referees: Al-Mawt, Al-Mahroon (BHR)
2 July 2018; 20:00	three players 5	(18–7)	Wazery 7	Hódos Imre Sports Hall, Debrecen; Attendance: 200; Referees: Al-Mawt, Al-Mahroon (BHR)
2 July 2018; 20:00	3× (yellow card) 3× (suspension)	Report	1× (yellow card) 7× (suspension)	Hódos Imre Sports Hall, Debrecen; Attendance: 200; Referees: Al-Mawt, Al-Mahroon (BHR)

3 July 2018; 16:00	Croatia	25–24	Germany	Hódos Imre Sports Hall, Debrecen; Attendance: 380; Referees: Belkhiri, Hamidi (ALG)
3 July 2018; 16:00	Lukić 8	(16–14)	Berger, Maidhof 6	Hódos Imre Sports Hall, Debrecen; Attendance: 380; Referees: Belkhiri, Hamidi (ALG)
3 July 2018; 16:00	3× (yellow card) 7× (suspension) 1× (red card)	Report	2× (yellow card) 7× (suspension)	Hódos Imre Sports Hall, Debrecen; Attendance: 380; Referees: Belkhiri, Hamidi (ALG)

3 July 2018; 18:00	Egypt	18–37	France	Hódos Imre Sports Hall, Debrecen; Attendance: 100; Referees: Năstase, Stancu (ROU)
3 July 2018; 18:00	Husein 5	(9–16)	Mauny 8	Hódos Imre Sports Hall, Debrecen; Attendance: 100; Referees: Năstase, Stancu (ROU)
3 July 2018; 18:00	6× (suspension)	Report	3× (yellow card) 4× (suspension)	Hódos Imre Sports Hall, Debrecen; Attendance: 100; Referees: Năstase, Stancu (ROU)

3 July 2018; 20:00	Sweden	31–24	Spain	Hódos Imre Sports Hall, Debrecen; Attendance: 200; Referees: Kiyashko, Kiselev (RUS)
3 July 2018; 20:00	Larsson 7	(18–11)	four players 4	Hódos Imre Sports Hall, Debrecen; Attendance: 200; Referees: Kiyashko, Kiselev (RUS)
3 July 2018; 20:00	2× (yellow card) 2× (suspension)	Report	3× (yellow card) 1× (suspension)	Hódos Imre Sports Hall, Debrecen; Attendance: 200; Referees: Kiyashko, Kiselev (RUS)

5 July 2018; 10:00	France	19–15	Sweden	Hódos Imre Sports Hall, Debrecen; Attendance: 110; Referees: Belkhiri, Hamidi (ALG)
5 July 2018; 10:00	Blonbou, Mauny 4	(6–5)	Lerby, Thorleifsdóttir 3	Hódos Imre Sports Hall, Debrecen; Attendance: 110; Referees: Belkhiri, Hamidi (ALG)
5 July 2018; 10:00	3× (yellow card) 5× (suspension)	Report	2× (yellow card) 3× (suspension)	Hódos Imre Sports Hall, Debrecen; Attendance: 110; Referees: Belkhiri, Hamidi (ALG)

5 July 2018; 12:00	Germany	27–21	Spain	Hódos Imre Sports Hall, Debrecen; Attendance: 100; Referees: Antić, Jakovljević (SRB)
5 July 2018; 12:00	Berger 10	(13–12)	Mbengue 4	Hódos Imre Sports Hall, Debrecen; Attendance: 100; Referees: Antić, Jakovljević (SRB)
5 July 2018; 12:00	1× (yellow card) 4× (suspension) 1× (red card)	Report	3× (yellow card) 6× (suspension)	Hódos Imre Sports Hall, Debrecen; Attendance: 100; Referees: Antić, Jakovljević (SRB)

5 July 2018; 14:00	Croatia	30–19	Egypt	Hódos Imre Sports Hall, Debrecen; Attendance: 67; Referees: Honda, Tabuchi (JPN)
5 July 2018; 14:00	Zeba 7	(11–12)	Waheed 6	Hódos Imre Sports Hall, Debrecen; Attendance: 67; Referees: Honda, Tabuchi (JPN)
5 July 2018; 14:00	1× (yellow card) 6× (suspension)	Report	1× (yellow card) 4× (suspension)	Hódos Imre Sports Hall, Debrecen; Attendance: 67; Referees: Honda, Tabuchi (JPN)

6 July 2018; 16:00	Germany	51–10	Egypt	Hódos Imre Sports Hall, Debrecen; Attendance: 120; Referees: Cheng, Zhou (CHN)
6 July 2018; 16:00	Fischer 9	(26–7)	Wazery 5	Hódos Imre Sports Hall, Debrecen; Attendance: 120; Referees: Cheng, Zhou (CHN)
6 July 2018; 16:00	2× (yellow card) 6× (suspension)	Report	2× (yellow card) 2× (suspension) 1× (red card)	Hódos Imre Sports Hall, Debrecen; Attendance: 120; Referees: Cheng, Zhou (CHN)

6 July 2018; 18:00	Spain	25–28	France	Hódos Imre Sports Hall, Debrecen; Attendance: 350; Referees: Kulik, Nabokau (BLR)
6 July 2018; 18:00	Mbengue 10	(15–17)	Nocandy 6	Hódos Imre Sports Hall, Debrecen; Attendance: 350; Referees: Kulik, Nabokau (BLR)
6 July 2018; 18:00	2× (yellow card) 4× (suspension)	Report	2× (yellow card) 1× (suspension)	Hódos Imre Sports Hall, Debrecen; Attendance: 350; Referees: Kulik, Nabokau (BLR)

6 July 2018; 20:00	Sweden	18–22	Croatia	Hódos Imre Sports Hall, Debrecen; Attendance: 180; Referees: Rocha, Magalhães (BRA)
6 July 2018; 20:00	Lerby 5	(12–13)	Mrazović 8	Hódos Imre Sports Hall, Debrecen; Attendance: 180; Referees: Rocha, Magalhães (BRA)
6 July 2018; 20:00	1× (yellow card) 4× (suspension)	Report	1× (yellow card) 4× (suspension)	Hódos Imre Sports Hall, Debrecen; Attendance: 180; Referees: Rocha, Magalhães (BRA)

8 July 2018; 10:00	Egypt	12–33	Sweden	Hódos Imre Sports Hall, Debrecen; Attendance: 100; Referees: Honda, Tabuchi (JPN)
8 July 2018; 10:00	five players 2	(5–17)	Rosell 9	Hódos Imre Sports Hall, Debrecen; Attendance: 100; Referees: Honda, Tabuchi (JPN)
8 July 2018; 10:00	1× (yellow card) 5× (suspension)	Report	2× (yellow card) 3× (suspension)	Hódos Imre Sports Hall, Debrecen; Attendance: 100; Referees: Honda, Tabuchi (JPN)

8 July 2018; 12:00	Spain	21–16	Croatia	Hódos Imre Sports Hall, Debrecen; Attendance: 150; Referees: Belkhiri, Hamidi (ALG)
8 July 2018; 12:00	Mbengue 6	(11–7)	Franušić 5	Hódos Imre Sports Hall, Debrecen; Attendance: 150; Referees: Belkhiri, Hamidi (ALG)
8 July 2018; 12:00	2× (yellow card) 2× (suspension)	Report	2× (yellow card) 1× (suspension)	Hódos Imre Sports Hall, Debrecen; Attendance: 150; Referees: Belkhiri, Hamidi (ALG)

8 July 2018; 14:00	France	26–24	Germany	Hódos Imre Sports Hall, Debrecen; Attendance: 230; Referees: Kiyashko, Kiselev (RUS)
8 July 2018; 14:00	Ekoh 6	(13–11)	Berger 5	Hódos Imre Sports Hall, Debrecen; Attendance: 230; Referees: Kiyashko, Kiselev (RUS)
8 July 2018; 14:00	2× (yellow card) 4× (suspension)	Report	2× (yellow card) 2× (suspension)	Hódos Imre Sports Hall, Debrecen; Attendance: 230; Referees: Kiyashko, Kiselev (RUS)

== President's Cup ==
=== 21st place bracket ===
21st–23rd place semifinal
10 July
Paraguay	31
Egypt	23

21st place
11 July
China	38
Paraguay	35

==== 21st–23rd place semifinal ====
10 July 2018; 09:30	Paraguay	31–23	Egypt	Hódos Imre Sports Hall, Debrecen; Attendance: 75; Referees: Abid, Chaouch (TUN)
10 July 2018; 09:30	Fernández 8	(13–12)	three players 5	Hódos Imre Sports Hall, Debrecen; Attendance: 75; Referees: Abid, Chaouch (TUN)
10 July 2018; 09:30	2× (yellow card) 3× (suspension)	Report	1× (yellow card) 6× (suspension)	Hódos Imre Sports Hall, Debrecen; Attendance: 75; Referees: Abid, Chaouch (TUN)

==== 21st place game ====
11 July 2018; 11:45	China	38–35	Paraguay	Hódos Imre Sports Hall, Debrecen; Attendance: 50; Referees: Hatipoğlu, Şimşek (TUR)
11 July 2018; 11:45	Wang, Zhou 9	(19–19)	Fernández 8	Hódos Imre Sports Hall, Debrecen; Attendance: 50; Referees: Hatipoğlu, Şimşek (TUR)
11 July 2018; 11:45	3× (yellow card) 6× (suspension)	Report	2× (yellow card) 3× (suspension)	Hódos Imre Sports Hall, Debrecen; Attendance: 50; Referees: Hatipoğlu, Şimşek (TUR)

=== 17th place bracket ===
17–20th place semifinals
10 July
Portugal	28
Chile	22
10 July
Angola	31
Spain (p)	32

17th place
11 July
Portugal	28
Spain	32
19th place
11 July
Chile	22
Angola	27

==== 17th–20th place semifinals ====
10 July 2018; 11:45	Portugal	28–22	Chile	Főnix Hall, Debrecen; Attendance: 50; Referees: Kiyashko, Kiselev (RUS)
10 July 2018; 11:45	Oliveira 8	(13–11)	Gómez 5	Főnix Hall, Debrecen; Attendance: 50; Referees: Kiyashko, Kiselev (RUS)
10 July 2018; 11:45	2× (yellow card) 2× (suspension)	Report	2× (yellow card) 1× (suspension)	Főnix Hall, Debrecen; Attendance: 50; Referees: Kiyashko, Kiselev (RUS)

10 July 2018
11:45
Angola
31–32
Spain
Hódos Imre Sports Hall, Debrecen
Attendance: 100
Referees: Rocha, Magalhães (BRA)
H. Paulo 10
(12–13)
Mbengue 8
2× (yellow card) 2× (suspension)
Report
1× (yellow card) 1× (suspension)

FT: 27–27 Pen: 4–5

==== 19th place game ====
11 July 2018; 09:30	Chile	22–27	Angola	Főnix Hall, Debrecen; Attendance: 80; Referees: Honda, Tabuchi (JPN)
11 July 2018; 09:30	Gómez 5	(9–13)	H. Paulo 7	Főnix Hall, Debrecen; Attendance: 80; Referees: Honda, Tabuchi (JPN)
11 July 2018; 09:30	1× (yellow card) 1× (suspension)	Report	4× (suspension)	Főnix Hall, Debrecen; Attendance: 80; Referees: Honda, Tabuchi (JPN)

==== 17th place game ====
11 July 2018; 11:45	Portugal	28–32	Spain	Főnix Hall, Debrecen; Attendance: 100; Referees: Năstase, Stancu (ROU)
11 July 2018; 11:45	Resende, Sousa 6	(13–14)	Mbengue 8	Főnix Hall, Debrecen; Attendance: 100; Referees: Năstase, Stancu (ROU)
11 July 2018; 11:45	1× (yellow card) 4× (suspension)	Report	1× (yellow card) 2× (suspension)	Főnix Hall, Debrecen; Attendance: 100; Referees: Năstase, Stancu (ROU)

== 9–16th placement games ==
The eight losers of the round of 16 will be seeded according to their results in the preliminary round against teams ranked 1–4.

=== Ranking ===
Pos	Team	Pld	W	D	L	GF	GA	GD	Pts
1	Croatia	3	2	0	1	63	61	+2	4
2	Iceland	3	1	1	1	67	83	−16	3
3	Brazil	3	1	0	2	64	68	−4	2
4	Sweden	3	1	0	2	52	59	−7	2
5	Japan	3	0	1	2	87	99	−12	1
6	Germany	3	0	0	3	66	70	−4	0
7	Slovenia	3	0	0	3	67	75	−8	0
8	Montenegro	3	0	0	3	53	78	−25	0

Source: IHF
Rules for classification: 1) points; 2) goal difference; 3) goals scored.

=== 15th place game ===
11 July 2018; 14:00	Slovenia	25–18	Montenegro	Hódos Imre Sports Hall, Debrecen; Attendance: 50; Referees: Emam, Hedaia (IRQ)
11 July 2018; 14:00	six players 3	(11–8)	three players 3	Hódos Imre Sports Hall, Debrecen; Attendance: 50; Referees: Emam, Hedaia (IRQ)
11 July 2018; 14:00	2× (suspension)	Report	2× (yellow card) 3× (suspension) 1× (red card)	Hódos Imre Sports Hall, Debrecen; Attendance: 50; Referees: Emam, Hedaia (IRQ)

=== 13th place game ===
11 July 2018; 16:15	Japan	22–23	Germany	Hódos Imre Sports Hall, Debrecen; Referees: Rocha, Magalhães (BRA)
11 July 2018; 16:15	Nakayama 11	(14–11)	Zschocke 6	Hódos Imre Sports Hall, Debrecen; Referees: Rocha, Magalhães (BRA)
11 July 2018; 16:15	2× (yellow card) 3× (suspension)	Report	1× (yellow card) 2× (suspension)	Hódos Imre Sports Hall, Debrecen; Referees: Rocha, Magalhães (BRA)

=== Eleventh place game ===
11 July 2018; 14:00	Brazil	21–18	Sweden	Főnix Hall, Debrecen; Attendance: 150; Referees: Al-Mawt, Al-Mahroon (BHR)
11 July 2018; 14:00	Nogueira 5	(12–10)	Larsson 5	Főnix Hall, Debrecen; Attendance: 150; Referees: Al-Mawt, Al-Mahroon (BHR)
11 July 2018; 14:00	2× (yellow card) 3× (suspension)	Report	2× (yellow card) 2× (suspension)	Főnix Hall, Debrecen; Attendance: 150; Referees: Al-Mawt, Al-Mahroon (BHR)

=== Ninth place game ===
11 July 2018; 18:30	Croatia	36–23	Iceland	Hódos Imre Sports Hall, Debrecen; Attendance: 50; Referees: Kulik, Nabokau (BLR)
11 July 2018; 18:30	Mrazović 9	(17–11)	Jacobsen 5	Hódos Imre Sports Hall, Debrecen; Attendance: 50; Referees: Kulik, Nabokau (BLR)
11 July 2018; 18:30	1× (yellow card) 1× (suspension)	Report	2× (yellow card) 4× (suspension)	Hódos Imre Sports Hall, Debrecen; Attendance: 50; Referees: Kulik, Nabokau (BLR)

== Knockout stage ==
=== Bracket ===
Round of 16
10 July
Russia	32
Brazil	20
10 July
Sweden	22
Netherlands	30
10 July
Iceland	30
Norway	35
10 July
France	29
Japan	25
10 July
Romania	28
Croatia	25
10 July
Hungary	31
Slovenia	17
10 July
Montenegro	23
South Korea	28
10 July
Denmark	25
Germany	24

Quarterfinals
11 July
Russia	28
Netherlands	26
11 July
Norway (OT)	27
France	26
11 July
Romania	26
Hungary	31
11 July
South Korea	24
Denmark	16

Semifinals
13 July
Russia	23
Norway	30
13 July
Hungary	30
South Korea	25

Final
14 July
Norway	22
Hungary	28
Third place
14 July
Russia	27
South Korea	29

5th place bracket

5th–8th place semifinals
13 July
Netherlands	29
France	23
13 July
Romania	20
Denmark	29

Fifth place
14 July
Netherlands	32
Denmark	28
Seventh place
14 July
France	30
Romania	24

=== Round of 16 ===
10 July 2018; 14:00	Russia	32–20	Brazil	Főnix Hall, Debrecen; Attendance: 300; Referees: Cheng, Zhou (CHN)
10 July 2018; 14:00	three players 4	(16–10)	Paizinho 5	Főnix Hall, Debrecen; Attendance: 300; Referees: Cheng, Zhou (CHN)
10 July 2018; 14:00	2× (yellow card) 5× (suspension)	Report	2× (yellow card) 4× (suspension)	Főnix Hall, Debrecen; Attendance: 300; Referees: Cheng, Zhou (CHN)

10 July 2018; 14:00	Romania	28–25	Croatia	Hódos Imre Sports Hall, Debrecen; Attendance: 150; Referees: Álvarez, Bustamante (ESP)
10 July 2018; 14:00	Tîrcă 8	(18–12)	Mrazović 8	Hódos Imre Sports Hall, Debrecen; Attendance: 150; Referees: Álvarez, Bustamante (ESP)
10 July 2018; 14:00	2× (yellow card) 5× (suspension)	Report	3× (yellow card) 5× (suspension)	Hódos Imre Sports Hall, Debrecen; Attendance: 150; Referees: Álvarez, Bustamante (ESP)

10 July 2018; 16:15	Hungary	31–17	Slovenia	Főnix Hall, Debrecen; Attendance: 3,200; Referees: Merz, Schilha (GER)
10 July 2018; 16:15	Klujber 7	(12–10)	Lovšin 8	Főnix Hall, Debrecen; Attendance: 3,200; Referees: Merz, Schilha (GER)
10 July 2018; 16:15	1× (yellow card) 3× (suspension)	Report	2× (suspension)	Főnix Hall, Debrecen; Attendance: 3,200; Referees: Merz, Schilha (GER)

10 July 2018; 16:15	Sweden	22–30	Netherlands	Hódos Imre Sports Hall, Debrecen; Attendance: 150; Referees: Sosa, Lemes (URU)
10 July 2018; 16:15	Thorleifsdóttir 6	(12–14)	Freriks, Van Wetering 6	Hódos Imre Sports Hall, Debrecen; Attendance: 150; Referees: Sosa, Lemes (URU)
10 July 2018; 16:15	3× (yellow card) 3× (suspension)	Report	1× (yellow card) 4× (suspension)	Hódos Imre Sports Hall, Debrecen; Attendance: 150; Referees: Sosa, Lemes (URU)

10 July 2018; 18:30	Iceland	30–35	Norway	Főnix Hall, Debrecen; Attendance: 150; Referees: Emam, Hedaia (IRQ)
10 July 2018; 18:30	Thompson 10	(15–15)	Ellertsen, Reistad 7	Főnix Hall, Debrecen; Attendance: 150; Referees: Emam, Hedaia (IRQ)
10 July 2018; 18:30	3× (yellow card) 3× (suspension)	Report	2× (yellow card) 4× (suspension)	Főnix Hall, Debrecen; Attendance: 150; Referees: Emam, Hedaia (IRQ)

10 July 2018; 18:30	Montenegro	23–28	South Korea	Hódos Imre Sports Hall, Debrecen; Attendance: 125; Referees: Al-Mawt, Al-Mahroon (BHR)
10 July 2018; 18:30	Đoković 8	(11–16)	Song 7	Hódos Imre Sports Hall, Debrecen; Attendance: 125; Referees: Al-Mawt, Al-Mahroon (BHR)
10 July 2018; 18:30	2× (yellow card) 1× (suspension)	Report	2× (yellow card) 4× (suspension) 1× (red card)	Hódos Imre Sports Hall, Debrecen; Attendance: 125; Referees: Al-Mawt, Al-Mahroon (BHR)

10 July 2018; 20:45	France	29–25	Japan	Főnix Hall, Debrecen; Attendance: 95; Referees: Năstase, Stancu (ROU)
10 July 2018; 20:45	Blonbou 8	(14–13)	Nakayama 9	Főnix Hall, Debrecen; Attendance: 95; Referees: Năstase, Stancu (ROU)
10 July 2018; 20:45	2× (yellow card) 4× (suspension)	Report	1× (yellow card)	Főnix Hall, Debrecen; Attendance: 95; Referees: Năstase, Stancu (ROU)

10 July 2018; 20:45	Denmark	25–24	Germany	Hódos Imre Sports Hall, Debrecen; Attendance: 300; Referees: Antić, Jakovljević (SRB)
10 July 2018; 20:45	Friis 9	(9–12)	Zschocke 8	Hódos Imre Sports Hall, Debrecen; Attendance: 300; Referees: Antić, Jakovljević (SRB)
10 July 2018; 20:45	2× (yellow card) 4× (suspension)	Report	1× (yellow card) 4× (suspension)	Hódos Imre Sports Hall, Debrecen; Attendance: 300; Referees: Antić, Jakovljević (SRB)

=== Quarterfinals ===
11 July 2018; 16:15	Romania	26–31	Hungary	Főnix Hall, Debrecen; Attendance: 4,000; Referees: Sosa, Lemes (URU)
11 July 2018; 16:15	three players 7	(17–14)	three players 6	Főnix Hall, Debrecen; Attendance: 4,000; Referees: Sosa, Lemes (URU)
11 July 2018; 16:15	6× (suspension)	Report	2× (yellow card) 4× (suspension)	Főnix Hall, Debrecen; Attendance: 4,000; Referees: Sosa, Lemes (URU)

11 July 2018; 18:30	Russia	28–26	Netherlands	Főnix Hall, Debrecen; Attendance: 450; Referees: Belkhiri, Hamidi (ALG)
11 July 2018; 18:30	Tazhenova 9	(14–14)	Van Wetering 7	Főnix Hall, Debrecen; Attendance: 450; Referees: Belkhiri, Hamidi (ALG)
11 July 2018; 18:30	2× (yellow card) 6× (suspension)	Report	2× (yellow card) 6× (suspension)	Főnix Hall, Debrecen; Attendance: 450; Referees: Belkhiri, Hamidi (ALG)

11 July 2018
20:45
Norway
27–26 (ET)
France
Főnix Hall, Debrecen
Attendance: 221
Referees: Antić, Jakovljević (SRB)
Reistad 7
(11–13)
Ekoh 8
2× (yellow card) 3× (suspension)
Report
1× (yellow card) 2× (suspension)

FT: 24–24 ET: 3–2

11 July 2018; 20:45	South Korea	24–16	Denmark	Hódos Imre Sports Hall, Debrecen; Attendance: 300; Referees: Álvarez, Bustamante (ESP)
11 July 2018; 20:45	Song 9	(11–7)	Friis 5	Hódos Imre Sports Hall, Debrecen; Attendance: 300; Referees: Álvarez, Bustamante (ESP)
11 July 2018; 20:45	2× (yellow card) 1× (suspension)	Report	4× (yellow card)	Hódos Imre Sports Hall, Debrecen; Attendance: 300; Referees: Álvarez, Bustamante (ESP)

=== 5–8th place semifinals ===
13 July 2018; 12:30	Netherlands	29–23	France	Főnix Hall, Debrecen; Attendance: 150; Referees: Kulik, Nabokau (BLR)
13 July 2018; 12:30	Van Wetering 12	(17–13)	Blonbou 7	Főnix Hall, Debrecen; Attendance: 150; Referees: Kulik, Nabokau (BLR)
13 July 2018; 12:30	1× (yellow card) 3× (suspension)	Report	2× (yellow card) 1× (suspension)	Főnix Hall, Debrecen; Attendance: 150; Referees: Kulik, Nabokau (BLR)

13 July 2018; 15:00	Romania	20–29	Denmark	Főnix Hall, Debrecen; Attendance: 180; Referees: Belkhiri, Hamidi (ALG)
13 July 2018; 15:00	Tecar 6	(11–13)	Elver 6	Főnix Hall, Debrecen; Attendance: 180; Referees: Belkhiri, Hamidi (ALG)
13 July 2018; 15:00	2× (yellow card) 1× (suspension) 1× (red card)	Report	1× (yellow card) 3× (suspension)	Főnix Hall, Debrecen; Attendance: 180; Referees: Belkhiri, Hamidi (ALG)

=== Semifinals ===
13 July 2018; 17:30	Russia	23–30	Norway	Főnix Hall, Debrecen; Attendance: 1,500; Referees: Álvarez, Bustamante (ESP)
13 July 2018; 17:30	Tazhenova 6	(12–14)	Reistad 7	Főnix Hall, Debrecen; Attendance: 1,500; Referees: Álvarez, Bustamante (ESP)
13 July 2018; 17:30	2× (yellow card) 5× (suspension)	Report	2× (yellow card) 5× (suspension)	Főnix Hall, Debrecen; Attendance: 1,500; Referees: Álvarez, Bustamante (ESP)

13 July 2018; 20:00	Hungary	30–25	South Korea	Főnix Hall, Debrecen; Attendance: 5,500; Referees: Antić, Jakovljević (SRB)
13 July 2018; 20:00	Háfra 7	(14–11)	Kim Y. 6	Főnix Hall, Debrecen; Attendance: 5,500; Referees: Antić, Jakovljević (SRB)
13 July 2018; 20:00	2× (yellow card) 3× (suspension)	Report	2× (yellow card) 2× (suspension)	Főnix Hall, Debrecen; Attendance: 5,500; Referees: Antić, Jakovljević (SRB)

=== Seventh place game ===
14 July 2018; 12:30	France	30–24	Romania	Főnix Hall, Debrecen; Attendance: 200; Referees: Al-Mawt, Al-Mahroon (BHR)
14 July 2018; 12:30	Blonbou 6	(16–11)	Severin 6	Főnix Hall, Debrecen; Attendance: 200; Referees: Al-Mawt, Al-Mahroon (BHR)
14 July 2018; 12:30	3× (yellow card) 2× (suspension)	Report	2× (yellow card) 6× (suspension)	Főnix Hall, Debrecen; Attendance: 200; Referees: Al-Mawt, Al-Mahroon (BHR)

=== Fifth place game ===
14 July 2018; 15:00	Netherlands	32–28	Denmark	Főnix Hall, Debrecen; Attendance: 200; Referees: Năstase, Stancu (ROU)
14 July 2018; 15:00	Freriks 12	(16–14)	Jensen 10	Főnix Hall, Debrecen; Attendance: 200; Referees: Năstase, Stancu (ROU)
14 July 2018; 15:00	1× (yellow card) 4× (suspension)	Report	1× (suspension)	Főnix Hall, Debrecen; Attendance: 200; Referees: Năstase, Stancu (ROU)

=== Third place game ===
14 July 2018; 17:30	Russia	27–29	South Korea	Főnix Hall, Debrecen; Attendance: 2,300; Referees: Merz, Schilha (GER)
14 July 2018; 17:30	Mikhaylichenko, Tazhenova 7	(13–10)	Song 11	Főnix Hall, Debrecen; Attendance: 2,300; Referees: Merz, Schilha (GER)
14 July 2018; 17:30	2× (yellow card) 2× (suspension)	Report	6× (suspension)	Főnix Hall, Debrecen; Attendance: 2,300; Referees: Merz, Schilha (GER)

=== Final ===
14 July 2018; 20:00	Norway	22–28	Hungary	Főnix Hall, Debrecen; Attendance: 6,500; Referees: Sosa, Lemes (URU)
14 July 2018; 20:00	Reistad 7	(12–10)	Háfra, Klujber 8	Főnix Hall, Debrecen; Attendance: 6,500; Referees: Sosa, Lemes (URU)
14 July 2018; 20:00	1× (yellow card) 4× (suspension)	Report	2× (yellow card) 2× (suspension)	Főnix Hall, Debrecen; Attendance: 6,500; Referees: Sosa, Lemes (URU)

== Final ranking ==
Rank	Team
Gold medal	Hungary
Silver medal	Norway
Bronze medal	South Korea
4	Russia
5	Netherlands
6	Denmark
7	France
8	Romania
9	Croatia
10	Iceland
11	Brazil
12	Sweden
13	Germany
14	Japan
15	Slovenia
16	Montenegro
17	Spain
18	Portugal
19	Angola
20	Chile
21	China
22	Paraguay
23	Egypt

== Awards ==
- MVP : (South Korea) Song Hye-soo
- Top Goalscorer : (Angola) Helena Paulo (73 goals)

=== All-Star Team ===
- Goalkeeper : (Russia) Polina Kaplina
- Right wing : (Hungary) Dorottya Faluvégi
- Right back : (Norway) Line Ellertsen
- Centre back : (Norway) Henny Reistad
- Left back : (Hungary) Noémi Háfra
- Left wing : (Denmark) Emma Friis
- Pivot : (Hungary) Noémi Pásztor
