= Louise Ellebæk =

Danish handball player (born 1998)

Personal information
- Full name: Louise Hansegaard Ellebæk
- Nationality: Danish
- Born: 10 January 1998 (age 28) Nykøbing Mors, Denmark
- Height: 1.83 m (6 ft 0 in)

Sport
- Sport: Handball
- Position: Left back
- Current club: SønderjyskE Håndbold
- Number: 20

Youth career
- Years: Team
- 2014-2017: FC Midtjylland Håndbold

Senior clubs
- Years: Team
- 2016-2018: FC Midtjylland Håndbold
- 2018-2022: Silkeborg-Voel KFUM
- 2022-2026: SønderjyskE Håndbold
Medal record
Junior European Championship
Silver medal – second place	2017 Slovenia

Louise Hansegaard Ellebæk (born 10 March 1998) is a Danish handball player for SønderjyskE Håndbold and the formerly Danish national junior team.

She is the sister of fellow handballer Tobias Ellebæk.

She also represented Denmark in the 2017 Women's U-19 European Handball Championship, where she got Runners-up, and in the 2018 Women's Junior World Handball Championship, placing 6th.

She was called up to represent the Danish national team on 28 September 2018, but she got injured just days before the match.

She retired in 2026 after not playing matches for over a year due to injuries.
