= Ekaterina Koroleva =

Ekaterina Koroleva may refer to:

- Katja Koroleva, American soccer referee
- Ekaterina Koroleva (handballer) (1998–2019), Russian handballer
