= Amalie Milling =

Danish handball player (born 1999)

Personal information
- Full name: Amalie Milling
- Nationality: Danish
- Born: 27 December 1999 (age 26) Hørsholm, Denmark
- Height: 1.82 m (6 ft 0 in)

Sport
- Sport: Handball
- Position: Goalkeeper
- Current club: Ikast Håndbold
- Number: 16

Youth career
- Years: Team
- 2005–2014: HUK Håndbold
- 2014–2017: Hellerup IK

Senior clubs
- Years: Team
- 2017–2018: Hellerup IK
- 2018–2022: København Håndbold
- 2022–2025: Team Esbjerg
- 2025–: Ikast Håndbold
National team
Years	Team	Apps	(Gls)
2018–	Denmark	29	(0)
Medal record
Youth World Championship
Silver medal – second place	2016 Slovakia
Youth European Championship
Gold medal – first place	2015 Macedonia
Junior European Championship
Silver medal – second place	2017 Slovenia
- Updated on 12 April 2026

Amalie Milling (born 27 December 1999) is a Danish handball player who plays for Ikast Håndbold and the Danish national team.

== Club career ==
Milling started playing handball at HUK Håndbold at the age of 5. Until 2018 she played for Hellerup IK in the 3rd tier of Danish handball. She then joined København Håndbold in the top division, where she played for 4 years before joining Team Esbjerg. Wth Team Esbjerg she won the Damehåndboldligaen and Danish Women's Handball Cup in 2023 and 2024. In 2025 she joined Ikast Håndbold after 3 years at Team Esbjerg.

== National Team ==
She also represented Denmark in the 2015 European Women's U-17 Handball Championship, where she received gold and in the 2016 Women's Youth World Handball Championship, placing Runners-up.

She made her debut on the Danish national team on 28 September 2018. Due to competition from Sandra Toft, Althea Reinhardt and Anna Kristensen she did however not see many caps for the Danish team.

At the 2025 World Women's Handball Championship she played at her first major international tournament as neither Sandra Toft nor Althea Reinhardt were available. Denmark went out in the quarterfinal to France after winning all matches in the group stages. This was the first time since 2019 that Denmark left a major international tournament without any medals.

== Individual awards ==
- Best Goalkeeper of the EHF European Under-19 Championship: 2017
