= Moon Su-hyeon =

South Korean handball player (born 1998)

Kim So-ra
Personal information
- Nationality: South Korean
- Born: 25 March 1998 (age 28)
- Height: 1.73 m (5 ft 8 in)

Sport
- Sport: Handball
- Position: Right back
- Current club: Korea National Sport University
National team
Years	Team	Apps
–	South Korea	13
Medal record
Junior World Championship
Bronze medal – third place	2018 Hungary

Moon Su-hyeon (Korean: 문수현; born 25 March 1998) is a South Korean handball player for the Korea National Sport University and the South Korean national team.

She participated at the 2019 World Women's Handball Championship.
