= Tobias Ellebæk =

Danish handball player (born 1992)

Personal information
- Nationality: Danish
- Born: 15 May 1992 (age 34) Nykøbing Mors, Denmark
- Height: 1.93 m (6 ft 4 in)

Sport
- Sport: Handball
- Position: Left back
- Current club: KIF Kolding
- Number: 17

Youth career
- Years: Team
- –: HF Mors

Senior clubs
- Years: Team
- 2011-2012: Stoholm Håndbold
- 2012-2016: Mors-Thy Håndbold
- 2016-2020: Aalborg Håndbold
- 2020-2024: Frisch Auf Göppingen
- 2024-: KIF Kolding
National team
Years	Team	Apps	(Gls)
2015-	Denmark	3	(5)
- Updated on 6 March 2025

Tobias Ellebæk (born 15 May 1992) is a Danish handball player for KIF Kolding.

He is the brother of fellow handballer Louise Ellebæk.

== Career ==
Ellebæk started his career at Mors-Thy Håndbold and joined Aalborg Håndbold in 2016. Here he won the Herrehåndboldligaen in 2017, 2019 and 2020 and the Danish Cup in 2018.

In 2020 he joined German team Frisch Auf Göppingen. At the 2023 EHF European League he won bronze medals with the club. In 2024 he returned to Denmark to join KIF Kolding. In the 2024-25 season with KIF Kolding he suffered relegation, after finishing last in the regular season. This was the first relegation for the team in 41 years.

He played many matches for the Danish youth national teams. He debuted for the Danish national team on November 6, 2015, against Spain.
