= Branka Konatar =

Montenegrin handball player (born 1999)

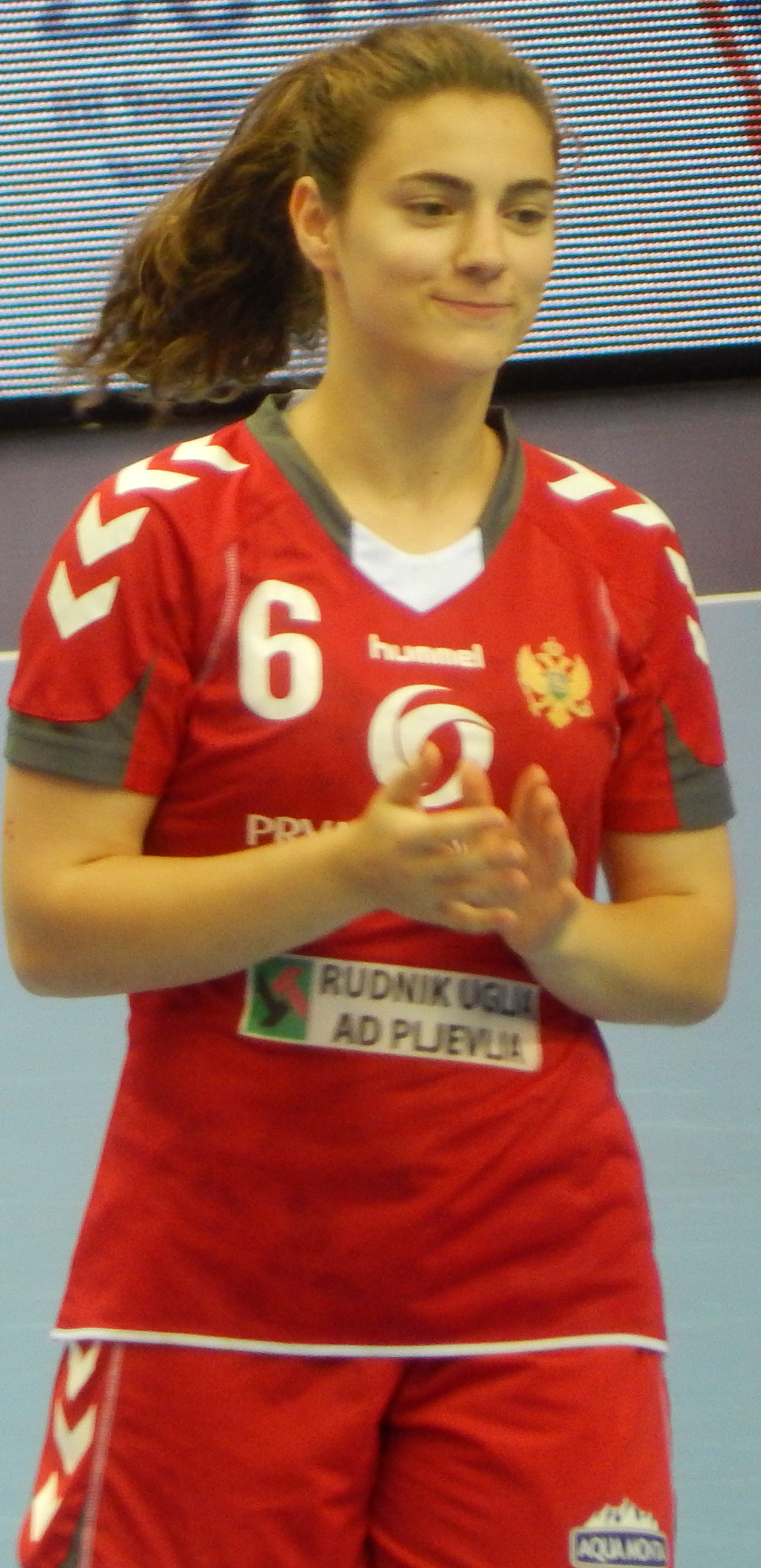

Personal information
- Nationality: Montenegrin
- Born: 2 November 1999 (age 26) Podgorica, Montenegro, FR Yugoslavia
- Height: 1.70 m (5 ft 7 in)

Sport
- Sport: Handball
- Position: Left Wing
- Current club: RK Krim
- Number: 8

Senior clubs
- Years: Team
- 2015-2017: ŽRK Danilovgrad
- 2017-2020: ZRK Buducnost
- 2020-2021: RK Krim
National team
- Years: Team
- –: Montenegro
Medal record
Mediterranean Games
Silver medal – second place	2018 Tarragona	Team

Branka Konatar (born 2 November 1999) is a Montenegrin handball player for RK Krim and the Montenegrin national team.

She was selected to represent Montenegro at the 2017 World Women's Handball Championship.
