= Karichma Ekoh =

French handball player (born 1998)

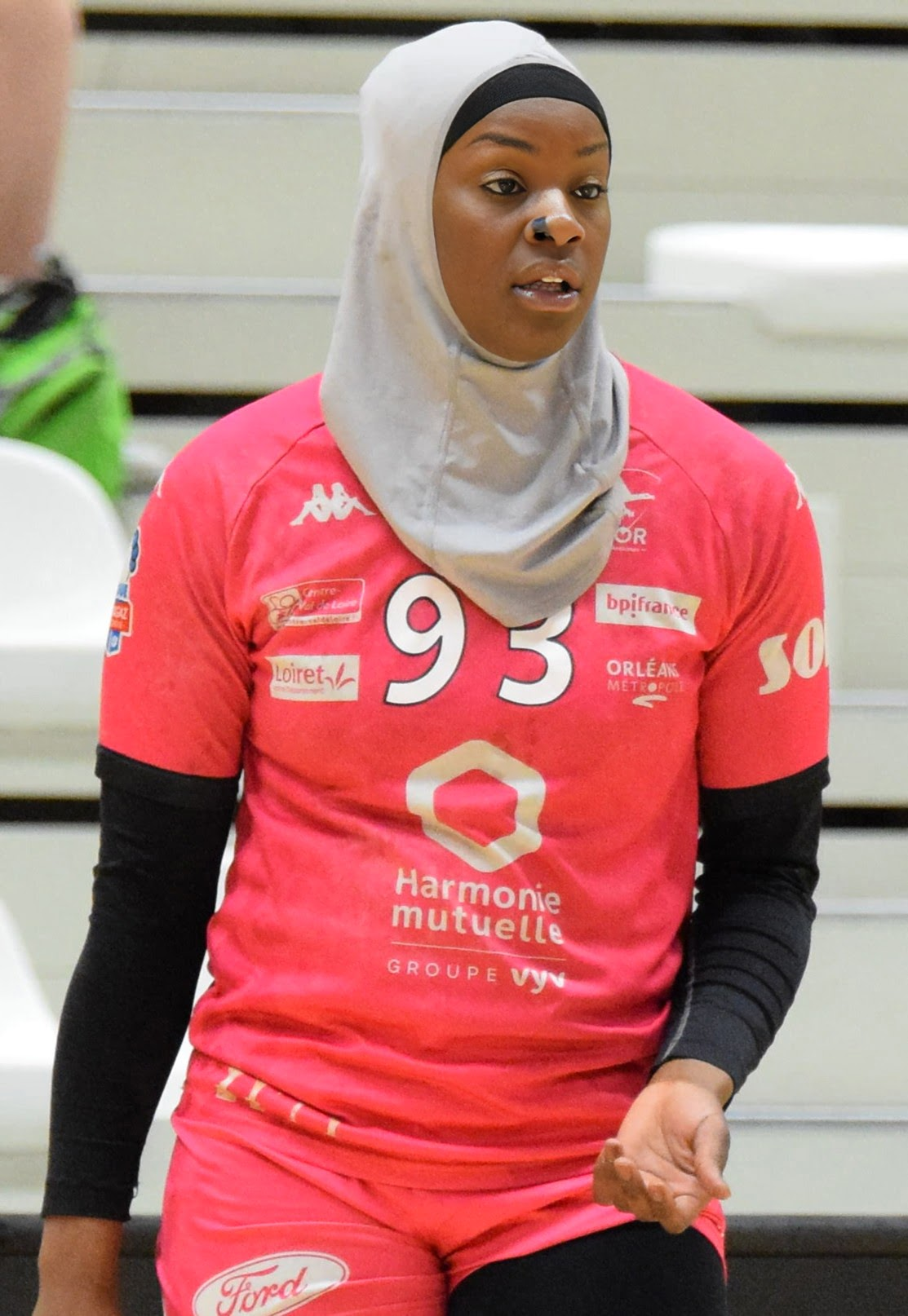
- Karichma Ekoh (2022)

Personal information
- Born: 4 March 1998 (age 28) Clichy, France
- Height: 1.75 m (5 ft 9 in)

Sport
- Sport: Handball
- Position: Left back
- Current club: Chambray Touraine Handball
- Number: 93

Youth career
- Years: Team
- 2012–2015: Aulnay HB
- 2015–2016: Blanc Mesnil Sport HB

Senior clubs
- Years: Team
- 2016–2019: Nantes Loire Atlantique HB
- 2019-2020: ESBF Besançon
- 2020-2021: HBC Celles-sur-Belle
- 2021: Stella Saint-Maur HB
- 2021-2022: Fleury Loiret HB
- 2022-2023: Chambray Touraine HB
- 2023-2025: Handball Erice
- 2025-: Noisy-le-Grand
National team
- Years: Team
- –: Cameroon
Medal record
Representing Cameroon
African Championship
Silver medal – second place	2021 Yaoundé
Silver medal – second place	2022 Dakar
Representing France
Junior European Championship
Gold medal – first place	2017 Slovenia

Karichma Ekoh (born 4 March 1998) is a French-Cameroonian female handball player who plays for Noisy-le-Grand.

As a youth player she represented France and won gold at the 2017 European Women's U-19 Handball Championship.

== International honours ==
- Junior World Championship:
  - Gold Medalist: 2017

== Individual awards ==
- Championnat de France Best Young Player: 2018
