= Hana Vučko =

Slovenian handball player

Personal information
- Nationality: Slovenian
- Born: 14 November 1998 (age 27) Ljubljana, Slovenia
- Height: 1.75 m (5 ft 9 in)

Sport
- Sport: Handball
- Position: Left back

Youth career
- Years: Team
- –2012: ŽRK Kranj
- 2012–2018: RK Krim

Senior clubs
- Years: Team
- 2018–2021: RK Krim
National team
Years	Team	Apps	(Gls)
2017–2020	Slovenia	33	(26)

Hana Vučko (born 14 November 1998) is a retired Slovenian handball player.

She was selected to represent the Slovenian national team at the 2017 World Women's Handball Championship.
