= Ekaterina Koroleva (handballer) =

Russian handball player (1998–2019)

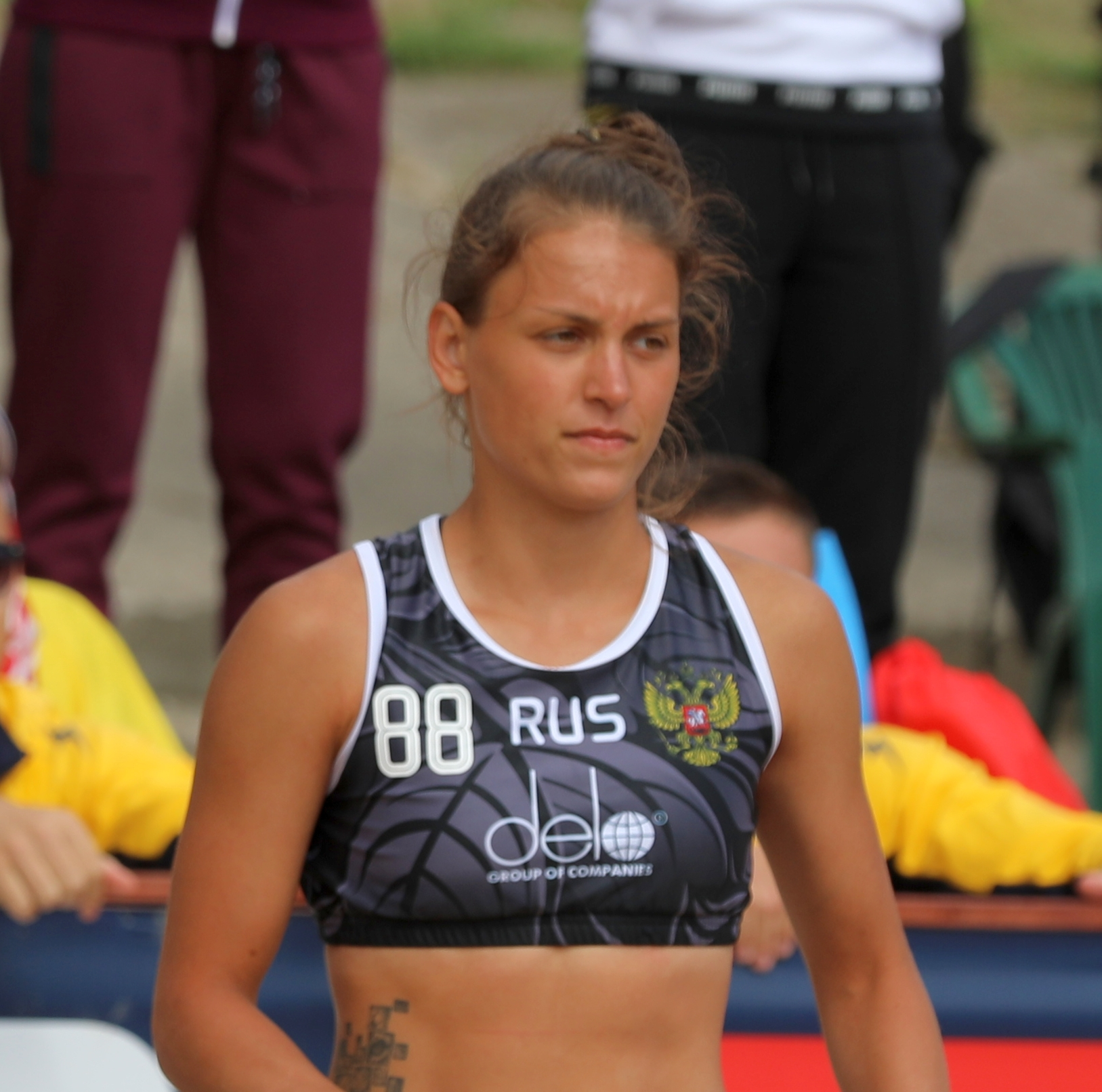
- Ekaterina Koroleva in a match at the Beach handball Euro 2019 in Stare Jabłonki/Poland against the Ukrainie in the main Round

Personal information
- Full name: Ekaterina Aleksandrovna Koroleva
- Nationality: Russian
- Born: 8 October 1998 Krymsk, Russia
- Died: 7 July 2019 (aged 20) Stare Jabłonki, Poland
- Height: 1.69 m (5 ft 7 in)

Sport
- Sport: Handball
- Position: Left wing
- Number: 17

Senior clubs
- Years: Team
- –2019: Stavropol SKFU
National team
- Years: Team
- –: Russia national beach handball team

Ekaterina Aleksandrovna Koroleva (Russian: Екатерина Александровна Королёва; 8 October 1998 – 7 July 2019) was a Russian handball player who played for Stavropol SKFU in Russia.

== Biography ==
Ekaterina Koroleva was an indoor handball and beach handball player born on 8 October 1998 in Krymsk, Russia. She played for Stavropol, a highly ranked team in the Russian women's league. She also had been a member of the Russian junior national team.

In 2017, Koroleva won a silver medal in the U-19 European Championships in Slovenia. Later, the Russian team forfeited that medal in response to a positive doping test by three of Koroleva's team members. The following year, Koroleva was ranked fourth at the 2018 Women's Junior World Handball Championship.

Koroleva played both indoor handball and beach handball. She had been a member of the Russia women's national beach handball team and participated in the 2019 European Beach Handball Championship at Stare Jabłonki, Poland. With the Russian team she ranked in ninth place. On the closing day of the competition, however, she died by drowning in a swimming accident.
