= Leonida Gichevska =

Macedonian female handballer

Personal information
- Nationality: Macedonian
- Born: 20 June 1998 (age 28) Sveti Nikole, Macedonia
- Height: 1.78 m (5 ft 10 in)

Sport
- Sport: Handball
- Position: Left back/middle back
- Current club: Handball Club Lada
- Number: 98

Youth career
- Years: Team
- 2014-2017: ŽRK Vardar

Senior clubs
- Years: Team
- 2014-2018: ŽRK Vardar
- 2018-2019: ŽRK Metalurg
- 2019-2020: ŽRK Kumanovo
- 2020-2021: Le Pouzin Handball
- 2021-2022: Sambre Avesnois Handball
- 2022-2023: RK Lokomotiva Zagreb
- 2023-: ESBF Besançon
- 2023-2024: CS Universitatea Știința București
- 2024-2025: Handball Club Lada
National team
Years	Team	Apps	(Gls)
2018–	North Macedonia	17	(65)

Leonida Gichevska (born 20 June 1998) is a Macedonian female handballer for Handball Club Lada and the North Macedonia national team.

She represented the North Macedonia at the 2022 European Women's Handball Championship.
