= Frida Rosell =

Swedish handball player (born 1999)

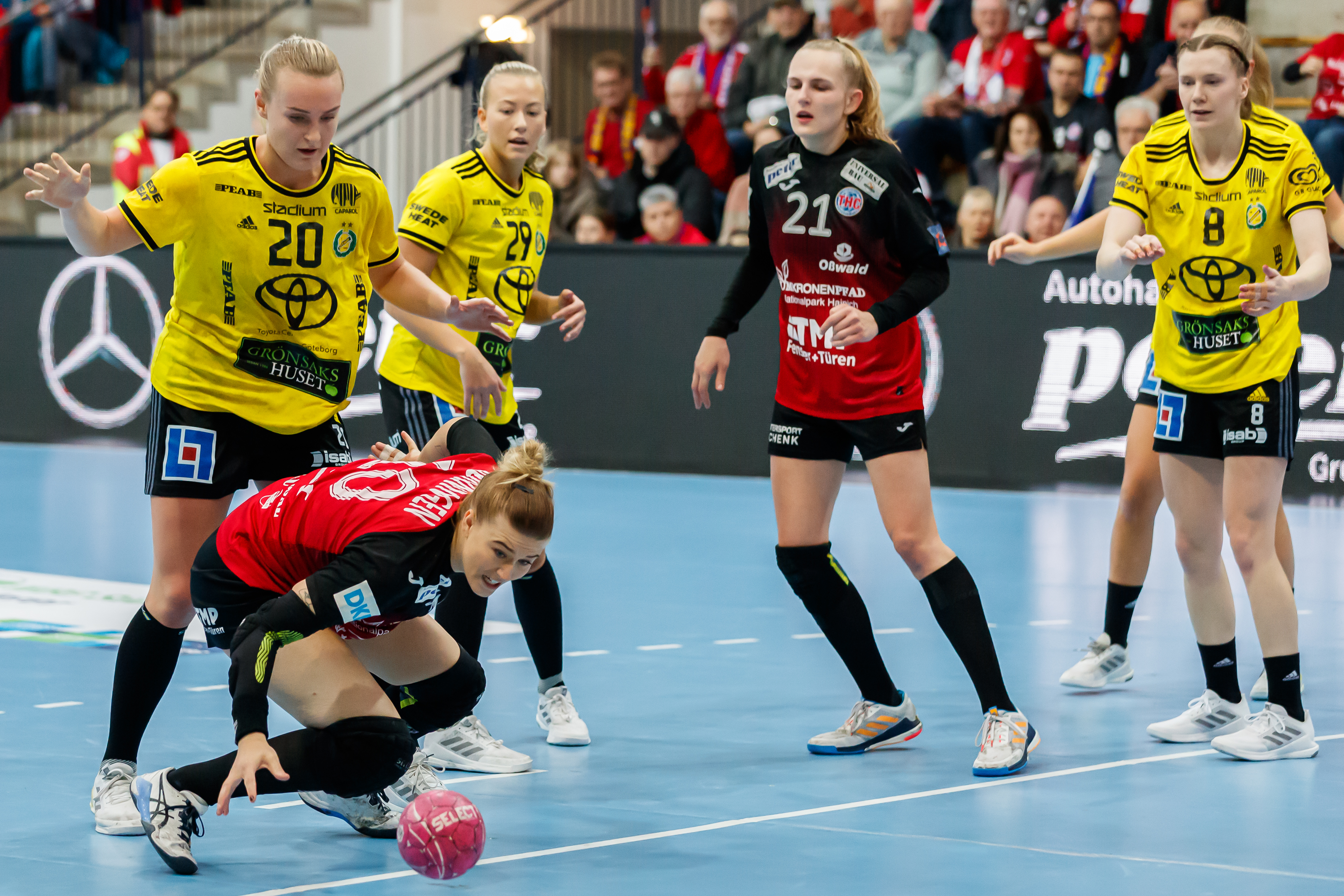

Personal information
- Nationality: Swedish
- Born: 6 May 1999 (age 27) Österhaninge, Sweden
- Height: 1.77 m (5 ft 10 in)

Sport
- Sport: Handball
- Position: Centre back
- Current club: ESBF Besançon

Senior clubs
- Years: Team
- 2015–2016: Skogås HK
- 2016–2018: Skuru IK
- 2018–2019: VästeråsIrsta HF
- 2019: Skuru IK
- 2019–2021: VästeråsIrsta HF
- 2021–2023: IK Sävehof
- 2023–: ESBF Besançon
National team
Years	Team	Apps	(Gls)
2020–	Sweden	4	(8)

Frida Rosell (born 6 May 1999) is a Swedish handball player for ESBF Besançon and the Swedish national team.

She made her debut on the Swedish national team on 1 October 2020, against Poland.

On 20 January 2023, it was announced that she had signed a two-year contract with ESBF Besançon in France.

== Achievements ==
- Svensk handbollselit:
  - Winner: 2022, 2023
  - Runner-up: 2021
- Swedish Handball Cup:
  - Winner: 2023

Individual awards

- All-Star Team as Best Left Back Svensk handbollselit 2022/23
