= Line Ellertsen Heldal =

Norwegian handball player (born 1998)

Personal information
- Nationality: Norwegian
- Born: 4 June 1998 (age 28) Stavanger, Norway
- Height: 1.74 m (5 ft 9 in)

Sport
- Sport: Handball
- Position: Right back
- Current club: Benfica

Senior clubs
- Years: Team
- –2015: Sola HK
- 2015–2017: Glassverket IF
- 2017–2019: Sola HK
- 2019–2022: Aarhus United
- 2022–2025: Storhamar HE
- 2025–2026: Rapid București
- 2026–: Benfica
Medal record
Junior World Championship
Silver medal – second place	2018 Hungary

Line Ellertsen Heldal (born 4 June 1998) is a Norwegian handball player for Rapid București.

She also represented Norway at the 2016 Women's Youth World Handball Championship, placing 4th and at the 2015 European Women's U-17 Handball Championship, placing 11th.

== Achievements ==
- Junior World Championship:
  - Silver Medalist: 2018
- EHF European League:
  - Winner: 2023/2024
- Norwegian League:
  - Gold Medalist: 2024/2025
  - Silver Medalist: 2022/2023, 2023/2024
- Norwegian Cup:
  - Winner: 2024
  - Finalist: 2023/2024

== Individual awards ==
- All-Star Right Back of the Junior World Championship: 2018
