= Milana Tazhenova =

Russian handball player

Personal information
- Full name: Milana Yelamanovna Tazhenova
- Nationality: Russian
- Born: 6 March 1999 (age 27) Astrakhan, Russia
- Height: 1.75 m (5 ft 9 in)

Sport
- Sport: Handball
- Position: Centre back
- Current club: Rostov-Don
- Number: 51

Senior clubs
- Years: Team
- 2016–2018: HC Astrakhanochka
- 2018–: Rostov-Don
Medal record
Youth World Championship
| Gold medal – first place | 2016 Slovakia |
U-17 European Championship
| Silver medal – second place | 2015 Macedonia |

Milana Yelamanovna Tazhenova (Russian: Милана Еламановна Таженова; Kazakh: Милана Еламанқызы Тәженова, romanized: Milana Elamanqyzy Täjenova; born 6 March 1999) is a Russian kazakh handball player who plays for Rostov-Don.

In September 2018, she was included by EHF in a list of the twenty best young handballers to watch for the future.
