= Jannela Blonbou =

French handball player (born 1998)

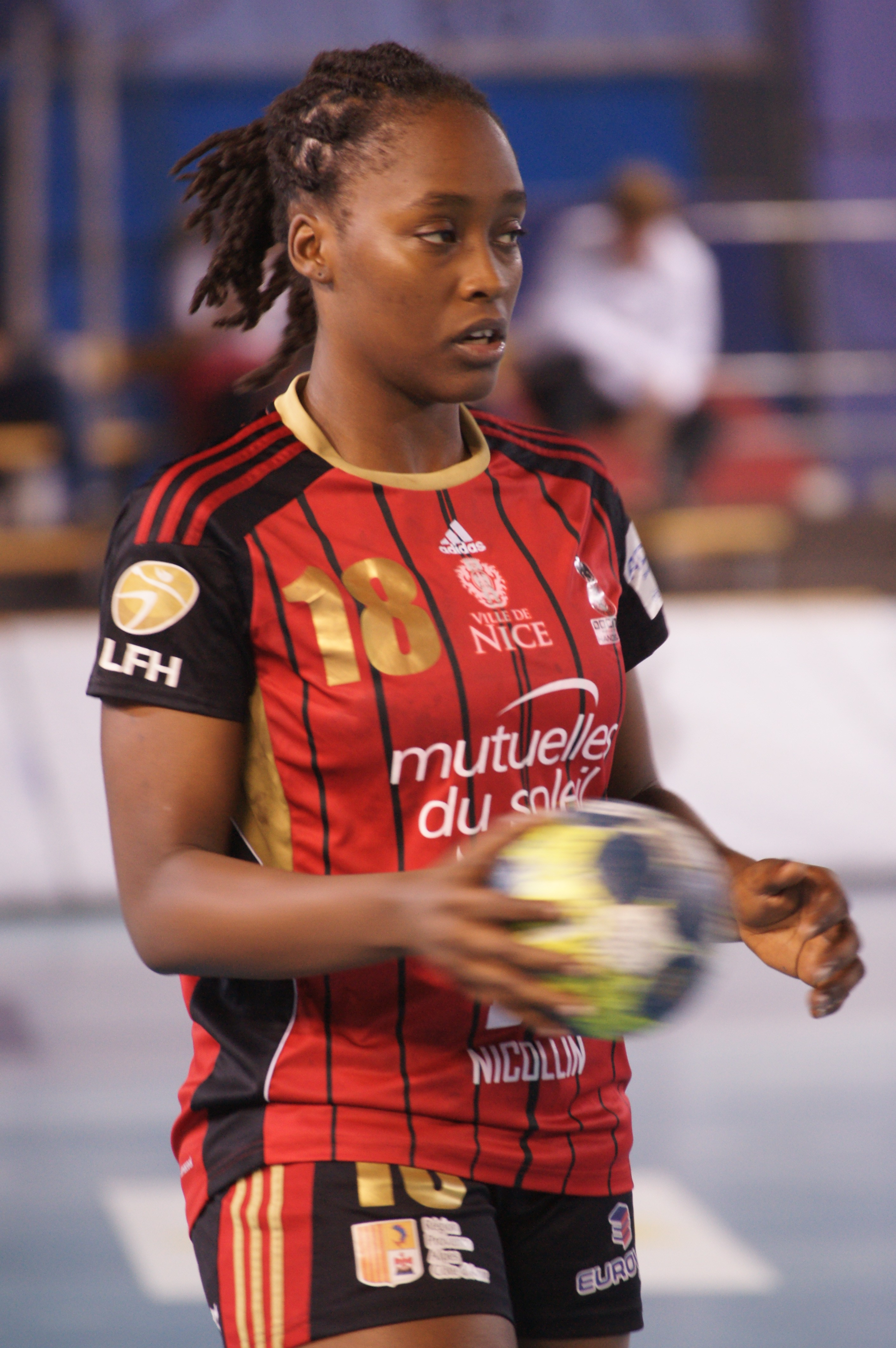

Personal information
- Nationality: French
- Born: 4 October 1998 (age 28) Les Abymes, Guadeloupe
- Height: 1.79 m (5 ft 10 in)

Sport
- Sport: Handball
- Position: Right back
- Current club: Chambray Touraine Handball
- Number: 8

Senior clubs
- Years: Team
- 2016–2020: OGC Nice
- 2020-: Chambray Touraine Handball
National team
Years	Team	Apps	(Gls)
2017–	France	1	(4)
Medal record
EHF Junior European Championship
Gold medal – first place	2017 Slovenia
- Updated on 22 May 2023

Jannela Blonbou (born 4 October 1998) is a French handballer who plays for OGC Nice and the France national team.

== International honours ==
- EHF Junior European Championship:
  - Gold Medalist: 2017

== Awards and recognition ==
- All-Star Right Back of the EHF Junior European Championship: 2017
