= Sayna Mbengue =

Spanish handball player (born 1998)

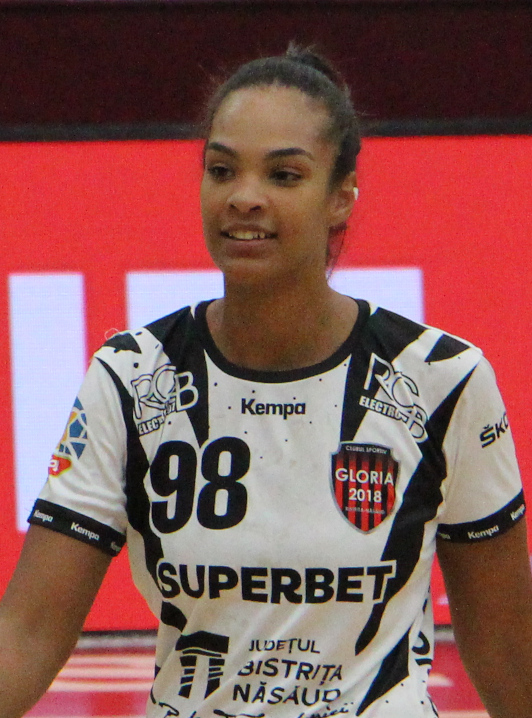

Personal information
- Born: 14 October 1998 (age 28) Las Palmas, Spain
- Height: 1.88 m (6 ft 2 in)

Sport
- Sport: Handball
- Position: Right back
- Current club: Gloria Bistrița
- Number: 98

Senior clubs
- Years: Team
- 2015–2023: Rocasa Gran Canaria
- 2023–: Gloria Bistrița
National team
Years	Team	Apps	(Gls)
2017–	Spain	22	(20)
- Updated on 2 August 2025

Seynabou Mbengue Rodríguez (born 14 October 1998) is a Spanish professional handballer who plays as a right back for Gloria Bistrița and the Spain national team.

== International honours ==
- EHF European Cup:
  - Winner: 2016, 2019, 2022

== Individual awards ==
- All-Star Right Back of the Spanish League: 2023

== Personal life ==
Born in Spain, Mbengue is of Senegalese descent through her father.
