= Mia Zschocke =

German handball player (born 1998)

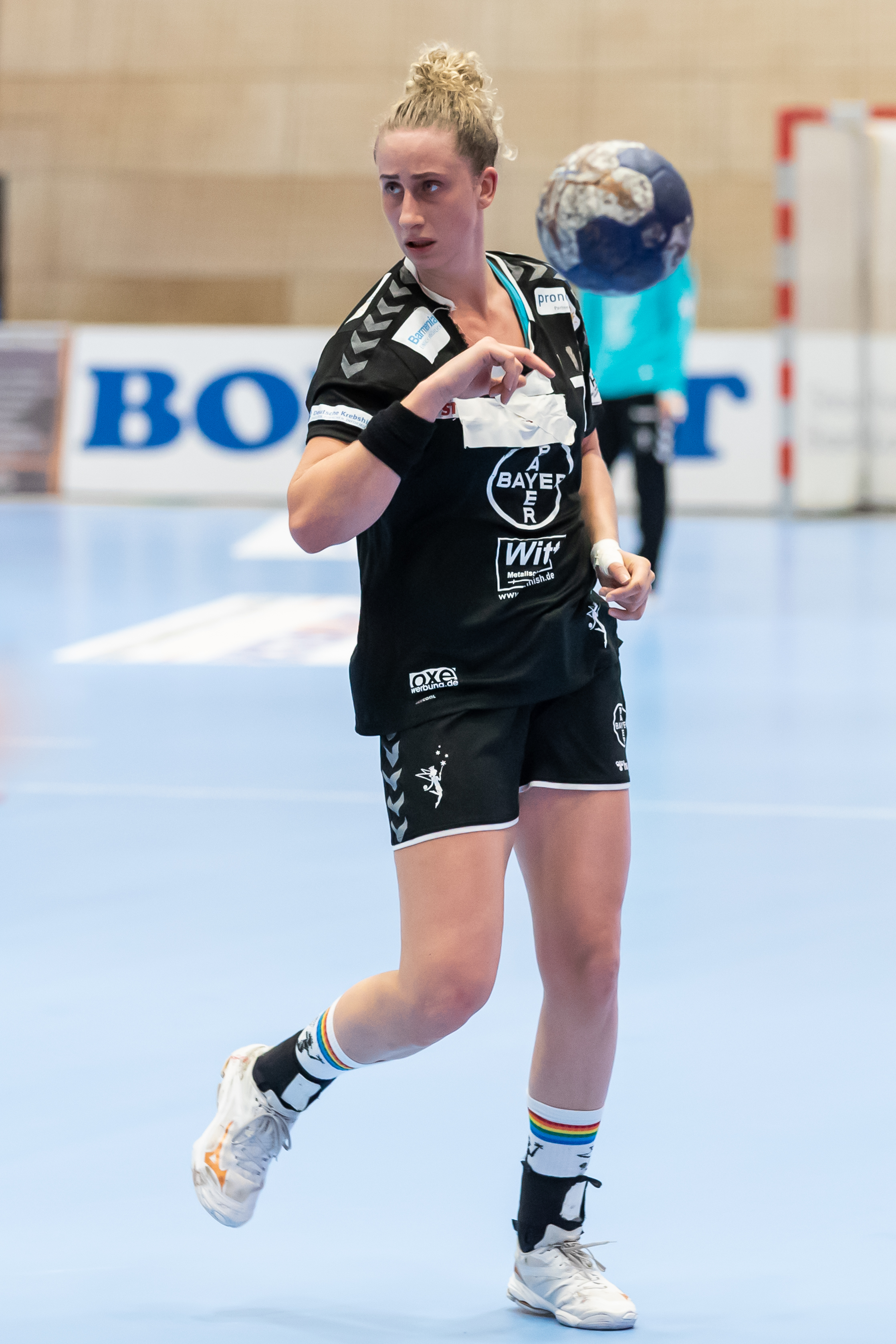

Personal information
- Nationality: German
- Born: 28 May 1998 (age 28) Aschaffenburg, Germany
- Height: 1.78 m (5 ft 10 in)

Sport
- Sport: Handball
- Position: Centre back
- Current club: SCM Râmnicu Vâlcea
- Number: 7

Youth career
- Years: Team
- –2014: TSV Lohr
- 2014–2017: Bayer Leverkusen

Senior clubs
- Years: Team
- 2014–2021: Bayer Leverkusen
- 2021–2022: Borussia Dortmund Handball
- 2022–2023: Storhamar HE
- 2023-: SCM Râmnicu Vâlcea (handball)
National team
Years	Team	Apps	(Gls)
2018–	Germany	27	(10)

Mia Zschocke (born 28 May 1998) is a German handball player for SCM Râmnicu Vâlcea and the German national team.

She participated at the 2018 European Women's Handball Championship.

== Achievements ==
- Norwegian League:
  - Silver Medalist: 2022/2023
