= Sorina Grozav =

Romanian handball player (born 1999)

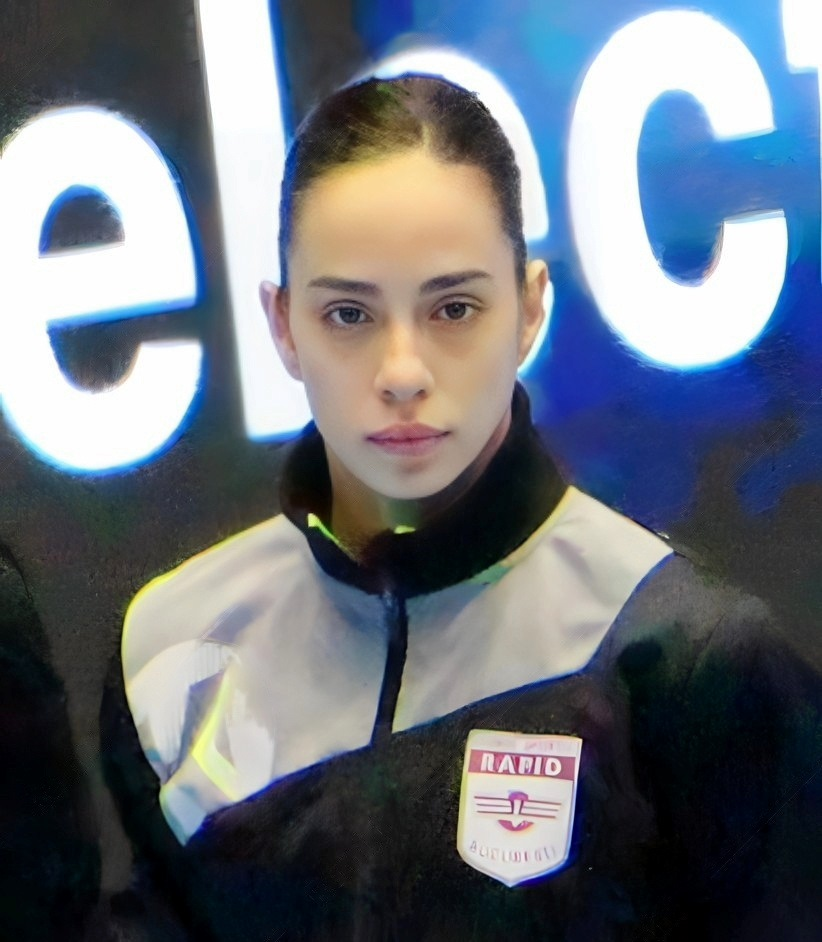

Personal information
- Full name: Sorina Maria Grozav
- Nationality: Romanian
- Born: 27 May 1999 (age 27) Râmnicu Vâlcea, Romania
- Height: 1.77 m (5 ft 10 in)

Sport
- Sport: Handball
- Position: Left back
- Current club: Corona Brașov
- Number: 99

Senior clubs
- Years: Team
- 2015–2021: Corona Brașov
- 2021–2025: CS Rapid București
- 2025–: Corona Brașov
National team
Years	Team	Apps	(Gls)
2016–	Romania	21	(34)
- Updated on 7 November 2025

Sorina Maria Grozav (née Tîrcă; born 27 May 1999) is a Romanian handballer who plays for Corona Brașov.

In September 2018, she was included by EHF in a list of the 20 best young handballers to watch for the future.

== International honours ==
- EHF Cup:
  - Semifinalist: 2016
- EHF European Under-17 Championship:
  - Fourth place: 2015

== Individual awards ==
- Top Scorer of the EHF European Under-17 Championship: 2015
- Top Scorer of the EHF European Under-19 Championship: 2017
- Gala Premiilor Handbalului Românesc Liga Națională Young Player of the Season: 2019

== Personal life ==
She is the daughter of the handball legend Mariana Tîrcă.

She studied law at Transilvania University of Brașov. In May 2022, she married footballer Gheorghe Grozav.
