= 2022 European Women's Handball Championship squads =

The following is a list of squads for each nation competing at the 2022 European Women's Handball Championship.

Each squad consisted of 20 players, and 16 players were selected on the day of each match. There was a maximum of six players who can be replaced during the tournament. However, in regard to the COVID-19 pandemic and the potential risk of several players from the same team testing positive, there was no limit to the number of replacements for players testing positive.

Age, caps and goals correct as of 4 November 2022.

== Group A ==
=== Croatia ===
A 20-player squad was announced on 17 October 2022. The final roster was revealed on 2 November 2022.

Head coach: Nenad Šoštarić

No.	Pos.	Name	Date of birth (age)	Height	App.	Goals	Club
1	GK	Lucija Bešen	29 March 1998 (aged 24)	1.80 m	33	1	(Croatia) RK Podravka Koprivnica
2	RW	Nikolina Zadravec	2 September 1997 (aged 25)	1.68 m	23	32	(Croatia) RK Podravka Koprivnica
3	LW	Paula Posavec	26 August 1996 (aged 26)	1.70 m	63	83	(Romania) Gloria Bistrița-Năsăud
6	P	Sara Šenvald	14 March 1996 (aged 26)	1.85 m	13	10	(Croatia) RK Podravka Koprivnica
7	LB	Dora Krsnik	19 January 1992 (aged 30)	1.70 m	51	97	(Romania) CS Mioveni
8	CB	Stela Posavec	26 August 1996 (aged 26)	1.74 m	52	101	(Croatia) RK Lokomotiva Zagreb
12	GK	Ivana Kapitanović	17 September 1994 (aged 28)	1.83 m	52	6	(Romania) Rapid București
14	LB	Larissa Kalaus	24 June 1996 (aged 26)	1.73 m	35	106	(Croatia) RK Podravka Koprivnica
15	RB	Dora Kalaus	24 June 1996 (aged 26)	1.72 m	35	11	(Croatia) RK Podravka Koprivnica
17	P	Katarina Ježić	19 December 1992 (aged 29)	1.73 m	95	200	(Turkey) Kastamonu Bld. GSK
19	RW	Tena Japundža	28 October 1998 (aged 24)	1.73 m	17	18	(Croatia) RK Lokomotiva Zagreb
23	RB	Katarina Pavlović	30 January 1995 (aged 27)	1.80 m	9	46	(Romania) CSM Târgu Jiu
25	RW	Lara Burić	13 August 2003 (aged 19)	1.70 m	8	8	(Croatia) RK Lokomotiva Zagreb
28	LW	Andrea Šimara	13 July 1997 (aged 25)	1.71 m	30	37	(Croatia) RK Podravka Koprivnica
31	P	Ana Debelić	9 January 1994 (aged 28)	1.83 m	59	106	(Norway) Vipers Kristiansand
38	LB	Tina Barišić	30 October 2000 (aged 22)	1.85 m	6	12	(Croatia) RK Podravka Koprivnica
40	LB	Tena Petika	16 June 2000 (aged 22)	1.90 m	4	15	(Croatia) RK Lokomotiva Zagreb
77	CB	Valentina Blažević	14 February 1994 (aged 28)	1.70 m	52	119	(Romania) Gloria Buzău
88	LB	Kristina Prkačin	21 October 1997 (aged 25)	1.83 m	19	8	(Romania) Gloria Buzău
91	GK	Tea Pijević	18 November 1991 (aged 30)	1.72 m	45	1	(Hungary) Alba Fehérvár KC

=== Hungary ===
A 21-player squad was announced on 18 October 2022. The final squad was revealed on 1 November 2022.

Head coach: Vladimir Golovin

No.	Pos.	Name	Date of birth (age)	Height	App.	Goals	Club
2	CB	Eszter Tóth	27 October 1992 (aged 30)	1.80 m	13	21	(Hungary) Mosonmagyaróvári KC SE
4	P	Petra Füzi-Tóvizi	15 March 1999 (aged 23)	1.78 m	46	51	(Hungary) Debrecen VSC
10	LW	Dorina Korsós	3 September 1995 (aged 27)	1.69 m	3	3	(Romania) CS Rapid București
11	RB	Anna Albek	2 December 2001 (aged 20)	1.89 m	8	3	(Hungary) Mosonmagyaróvári KC SE
12	GK	Melinda Szikora	19 November 1988 (aged 33)	1.75 m	33	0	(Germany) SG BBM Bietigheim
15	LB	Kinga Debreczeni-Klivinyi	31 March 1992 (aged 30)	1.73 m	61	133	(Hungary) Siófok KC
19	LW	Gréta Márton	3 October 1999 (aged 23)	1.73 m	50	118	(Hungary) Ferencváros TC
24	RW	Alexandra Töpfner	8 February 1996 (aged 26)	1.60 m	0	0	(Hungary) Debrecen VSC
31	GK	Zsófi Szemerey	2 June 1994 (aged 28)	1.83 m	6	0	(Hungary) Mosonmagyaróvári KC SE
32	P	Noémi Pásztor	2 April 1999 (aged 23)	1.80 m	9	5	(Hungary) Mosonmagyaróvári KC SE
38	CB	Petra Vámos	14 September 2000 (aged 22)	1.70 m	39	93	(Hungary) Debrecen VSC
42	RB	Katrin Klujber	21 April 1999 (aged 23)	1.70 m	50	238	(Hungary) Ferencváros TC
44	LB	Gréta Kácsor	24 April 2000 (aged 22)	1.76 m	23	48	(Hungary) Debrecen VSC
58	P	Réka Bordás	26 August 1997 (aged 25)	1.84 m	25	36	(Hungary) Debrecen VSC
59	CB	Csenge Kuczora	26 January 2000 (aged 22)	1.76 m	6	17	(Hungary) Váci NKSE
61	GK	Kinga Janurik	6 November 1991 (aged 30)	1.78 m	48	1	(Hungary) Ferencváros TC
66	RW	Viktória Győri-Lukács	31 October 1995 (aged 27)	1.68 m	92	254	(Hungary) Győri Audi ETO KC
92	LB	Dóra Hornyák	24 January 1992 (aged 30)	1.79 m	31	54	(Hungary) Debrecen VSC

=== Norway ===
The squad was announced on 11 October 2022.

Head coach: (Iceland) Þórir Hergeirsson

No.	Pos.	Name	Date of birth (age)	Height	App.	Goals	Club
1	GK	Marie Davidsen	20 August 1993 (aged 29)	1.78 m	5	0	(Romania) CSM București
3	LB	Emilie Hegh Arntzen	1 January 1994 (aged 28)	1.84 m	140	228	(Romania) CSM București
5	LB	Ragnhild Valle Dahl	2 January 1998 (aged 24)	1.83 m	2	0	(Norway) Vipers Kristiansand
6	P	Maren Nyland Aardahl	2 March 1994 (aged 28)	1.83 m	20	28	(Denmark) Odense Håndbold
7	RB	Stine Skogrand	9 March 1993 (aged 29)	1.73 m	113	197	(Denmark) Ikast Håndbold
9	RB	Nora Mørk	5 April 1991 (aged 31)	1.67 m	158	769	(Denmark) Team Esbjerg
10	CB	Stine Bredal Oftedal (c)	25 September 1991 (aged 31)	1.68 m	229	625	(Hungary) Győri Audi ETO KC
11	RW	Malin Aune	4 March 1995 (aged 27)	1.65 m	88	164	(Romania) CSM București
12	GK	Silje Solberg	16 June 1990 (aged 32)	1.78 m	183	6	(Hungary) Győri Audi ETO KC
14	LB	Kristine Breistøl	23 August 1993 (aged 29)	1.93 m	47	52	(Denmark) Team Esbjerg
15	P	Vilde Ingstad	18 December 1994 (aged 27)	1.78 m	98	103	(Denmark) Team Esbjerg
16	GK	Katrine Lunde	30 March 1980 (aged 42)	1.81 m	331	3	(Norway) Vipers Kristiansand
22	RB	Kristina Novak	29 August 2000 (aged 22)	1.76 m	8	25	(Norway) Sola HK
25	CB	Henny Reistad	9 February 1999 (aged 23)	1.81 m	56	202	(Denmark) Team Esbjerg
26	RW	Emilie Hovden	5 April 1996 (aged 26)	1.63 m	10	35	(Denmark) Viborg HK
27	LW	Sunniva Næs Andersen	12 November 1996 (aged 25)	1.73 m	9	21	(Norway) Vipers Kristiansand
30	LW	Anniken Wollik	5 December 1997 (aged 24)	1.66 m	3	2	(Norway) Romerike Ravens
33	LB	Thale Rushfeldt Deila	15 January 2000 (aged 22)	1.78 m	8	13	(Norway) Molde Elite
46	P	Ane Høgseth	15 January 2001 (aged 21)	1.78 m	8	6	(Norway) Storhamar HE

=== Switzerland ===
The squad was announced on 13 October 2022.

Head coach: (Denmark) Martin Albertsen

No.	Pos.	Name	Date of birth (age)	Height	App.	Goals	Club
1	GK	Lea Schüpbach	10 September 1997 (aged 25)	1.78 m	38	0	(Germany) TuS Metzingen
2	P	Chantal Wick	24 February 1994 (aged 28)	1.74 m	41	32	(Denmark) Ajax København
3	CB	Kerstin Kündig	2 July 1993 (aged 29)	1.74 m	77	211	(Denmark) Viborg HK
5	P	Lisa Frey	16 February 1995 (aged 27)	1.74 m	78	136	(Germany) HSG Blomberg-Lippe
7	P	Tabea Schmid	14 August 2003 (aged 19)	1.77 m	18	54	(Switzerland) LC Brühl Handball
8	RW	Mia Emmenegger	17 January 2005 (aged 17)	1.61 m	14	73	(Switzerland) Spono Eagles
10	LB	Daphne Gautschi	9 July 2000 (aged 22)	1.71 m	36	122	(Germany) Neckarsulmer SU
11	LW	Leah Stutz	26 November 1998 (aged 23)	1.62 m	6	1	(Switzerland) LK Zug
12	GK	Manuela Brütsch	14 February 1984 (aged 38)	1.76 m	159	0	(Germany) HSG Bad Wildungen
13	RB	Xenia Hodel	27 November 1998 (aged 23)	1.76 m	58	196	(Switzerland) Spono Eagles
14	LW	Dimitra Hess	14 August 2000 (aged 22)	1.65 m	22	32	(Switzerland) LC Brühl Handball
16	GK	Sladana Dokovic	22 July 1995 (aged 27)	1.77 m	35	0	(Switzerland) LC Brühl Handball
17	LB	Charlotte Kähr	27 June 2001 (aged 21)	1.73 m	33	51	(Germany) Buxtehuder SV
20	LW	Alessia Riner	8 January 2004 (aged 18)	1.70 m	18	36	(Switzerland) LK Zug
21	RB	Malin Altherr	14 February 2003 (aged 19)	1.73 m	23	27	(Switzerland) LC Brühl Handball
22	CB	Nuria Bucher	21 March 2005 (aged 17)	1.77 m	3	2	(Switzerland) Spono Eagles
24	P	Stefanie Eugster	16 August 2001 (aged 21)	1.78 m	27	13	(Switzerland) LK Zug
26	RW	Sev Albrecht	26 April 2005 (aged 17)	1.62 m	6	1	(Switzerland) HV Herzogenbuchsee

== Group B ==
=== Denmark ===
The squad was announced on 6 October 2022. On 11 October, Michala Møller replaced Mia Rej in the squad due to a knee injury. On 4 November, Andrea Hansen was added to the squad. 10 days later, Kaja Kamp was added to the squad.

Head coach: Jesper Jensen

No.	Pos.	Name	Date of birth (age)	Height	App.	Goals	Club
1	GK	Sandra Toft	18 October 1989 (aged 33)	1.74 m	159	1	(Hungary) Győri Audi ETO KC
3	P	Kaja Kamp	29 April 1994 (aged 28)	1.72 m	0	0	(Denmark) Team Esbjerg
5	P	Sarah Iversen	10 April 1990 (aged 32)	1.77 m	59	85	(Denmark) Ikast Håndbold
8	LB	Anne Mette Hansen	25 August 1994 (aged 28)	1.85 m	135	388	(Hungary) Győri Audi ETO KC
9	RB	Alberte Madsen	15 September 2000 (aged 22)	1.85 m	0	0	(Denmark) Nykøbing Falster Håndboldklub
10	P	Kathrine Heindahl	26 March 1992 (aged 30)	1.85 m	111	228	(Denmark) Team Esbjerg
12	GK	Anna Kristensen	25 October 2000 (aged 22)	1.84 m	17	0	(Denmark) Viborg HK
16	GK	Althea Reinhardt	1 September 1996 (aged 26)	1.79 m	85	0	(Denmark) Odense Håndbold
18	RB	Mette Tranborg	1 January 1996 (aged 26)	1.92 m	95	226	(Denmark) Team Esbjerg
21	RW	Andrea Hansen	22 May 2000 (aged 22)	1.78 m	18	17	(Denmark) København Håndbold
23	LB	Kristina Jørgensen	17 January 1998 (aged 24)	1.85 m	80	199	(France) Metz Handball
25	RW	Trine Østergaard	17 October 1991 (aged 31)	1.66 m	152	282	(Germany) SG BBM Bietigheim
27	RB	Louise Burgaard	17 October 1992 (aged 30)	1.78 m	145	294	(France) Metz Handball
31	CB	Simone Petersen	28 August 1997 (aged 25)	1.77 m	26	45	(Denmark) Ikast Håndbold
32	LB	Mie Højlund	24 October 1997 (aged 25)	1.73 m	71	124	(Denmark) Odense Håndbold
33	LW	Emma Friis	31 October 1999 (aged 23)	1.62 m	27	61	(Denmark) Ikast Håndbold
34	P	Rikke Iversen	18 May 1993 (aged 29)	1.78 m	47	67	(Denmark) Odense Håndbold
41	LW	Elma Halilcevic	18 June 2000 (aged 22)	1.68 m	7	15	(Denmark) Nykøbing Falster
42	LB	Michala Møller	16 February 2000 (aged 22)	1.78 m	15	12	(Denmark) Team Esbjerg
44	RW	Cecilie Brandt	16 November 2001 (aged 20)	1.69 m	10	20	(Denmark) Ikast Håndbold

=== Serbia ===
A 21-player squad was announced on 20 October 2022. The final roster was revealed on 2 November 2022.

Head coach: (Slovenia) Uroš Bregar

No.	Pos.	Name	Date of birth (age)	Height	App.	Goals	Club
2	LW	Sanja Radosavljević	15 January 1994 (aged 28)	1.71 m	85	209	(Slovenia) RK Krim
4	CB	Teodora Majkić	6 October 2000 (aged 22)	1.84 m	5	11	(Serbia) ŽORK Jagodina
8	RW	Jovana Bogojević	30 August 1994 (aged 28)	1.69 m	10	22	(Sweden) Kristianstad Handboll
9	RB	Jelena Lavko	6 July 1991 (aged 31)	1.82 m	126	309	(Romania) CS Minaur Baia Mare
12	GK	Jelena Đurašinović	26 March 1998 (aged 24)	1.76 m	8	2	(Serbia) ŽORK Jagodina
13	LW	Nataša Ćetković	22 December 2005 (aged 16)	1.75 m	5	14	(Serbia) ŽRK Srem
14	P	Edita Nuković	1 August 1997 (aged 25)	1.80 m	5	3	(Germany) SV Union Halle-Neustadt
15	RB	Anđela Janjušević	18 June 1995 (aged 27)	1.81 m	64	122	(Hungary) Siófok KC
16	GK	Jovana Risović	7 October 1993 (aged 29)	1.71 m	79	4	(Slovenia) RK Krim
17	RW	Ana Kojić	4 October 1997 (aged 25)	1.65 m	18	27	(Hungary) Mosonmagyaróvári KC SE
24	LB	Jovana Kovačević	9 April 1996 (aged 26)	1.78 m	25	67	(Romania) CS Gloria Bistrița-Năsăud
25	LW	Aleksandra Stamenić	12 July 1998 (aged 24)	1.75 m	8	11	(Hungary) Kisvárdai KC
29	RW	Nataša Lovrić	2 October 2000 (aged 22)	1.73 m	8	15	(Serbia) ŽRK Zelezničar
31	P	Katarina Bojicić	13 March 1998 (aged 24)	1.79 m	6	18	(Serbia) ŽORK Jagodina
33	LB	Jovana Stoiljković	30 September 1988 (aged 34)	1.82 m	124	388	(France) Chambray
71	CB	Kristina Liščević	20 October 1989 (aged 33)	1.73 m	119	292	(Romania) SCM Râmnicu Vâlcea
83	P	Marija Petrović	18 March 1994 (aged 28)	1.87 m	21	32	(Romania) SCM Gloria Buzău
91	GK	Kristina Graovac	14 August 1991 (aged 31)	1.73 m	33	3	(Hungary) Kisvárdai KC

=== Slovenia ===
A 19-player squad was announced on 24 October 2022.

Head coach: (Montenegro) Dragan Adžić

No.	Pos.	Name	Date of birth (age)	Height	App.	Goals	Club
1	GK	Branka Zec	31 October 1986 (aged 36)	1.79 m	81	1	(Germany) VfL Waiblingen
2	P	Valentina Klemenčič	5 February 2002 (aged 20)	1.85 m	18	17	(Slovenia) RK Krim
4	LB	Erin Novak	7 June 2002 (aged 20)	1.77 m	7	0	(Slovenia) RK Krško
6	RB	Ana Gros	21 January 1991 (aged 31)	1.86 m	133	660	(Hungary) Győri Audi ETO KC
7	CB	Elizabeth Omoregie	29 December 1996 (aged 25)	1.78 m	19	39	(Romania) CSM București
8	LW	Ema Marković	17 August 2003 (aged 19)	1.70 m	0	0	(Slovenia) ŽRK Z'dežele
9	CB	Nina Žabjek	4 March 1998 (aged 24)	1.78 m	44	25	(Slovenia) RK Krim
10	LB	Tjaša Stanko	5 November 1997 (aged 24)	1.73 m	79	356	(Slovenia) RK Krim
11	LB	Ana Abina	30 July 1997 (aged 25)	1.75 m	53	44	(Slovenia) RK Ajdovščina
13	P	Urša Zelnik	17 October 1997 (aged 25)	1.70 m	3	1	(Slovenia) RK Ajdovščina
14	LW	Tamara Mavsar	1 April 1991 (aged 31)	1.72 m	82	299	(Hungary) Siófok KC
16	GK	Maja Vojnović	26 January 1998 (aged 24)	1.80 m	49	0	(France) Saint-Amand Handball
17	P	Nataša Ljepoja	28 January 1996 (aged 26)	1.78 m	47	60	(Slovenia) RK Krim
18	CB	Nina Zulić	4 December 1995 (aged 26)	1.70 m	65	165	(Romania) CS Gloria Bistrița-Năsăud
20	RW	Alja Varagić	11 December 1990 (aged 31)	1.85 m	77	164	(Slovenia) RK Krim
21	GK	Amra Pandžić	20 September 1989 (aged 33)	1.78 m	77	2	(Romania) CS Minaur Baia Mare
25	RB	Barbara Lazović	4 January 1988 (aged 34)	1.83 m	84	292	(Slovenia) RK Krim
28	LW	Maja Svetik	9 March 1996 (aged 26)	1.68 m	35	51	(Slovenia) RK Krim
66	RW	Tija Gomilar Zickero	12 May 2000 (aged 22)	1.68 m	20	32	(Germany) Neckarsulmer SU
88	LW	Ema Abina	18 February 1999 (aged 23)	1.70 m	8	8	(Slovenia) RK Krim

=== Sweden ===
A 21-player squad was announced on 6 October 2022. The final squad was revealed on 31 October 2022. On 7 November Clara Petersson Bergsten replaced Nina Dano due to an injury. Six days later, Linn Hansson replaced Sara Johansson.

Head coach: Tomas Axnér

No.	Pos.	Name	Date of birth (age)	Height	App.	Goals	Club
1	GK	Johanna Bundsen	3 June 1991 (aged 31)	1.85 m	118	2	(Sweden) IK Sävehof
3	RB	Nina Koppang	31 May 2002 (aged 20)	1.77 m	3	7	(Sweden) IK Sävehof
6	CB	Carin Strömberg	10 July 1993 (aged 29)	1.84 m	127	196	(France) Neptunes de Nantes
7	P	Linn Blohm	20 May 1992 (aged 30)	1.80 m	138	386	(Hungary) Győri Audi ETO KC
8	LB	Jamina Roberts	28 May 1990 (aged 32)	1.76 m	203	483	(Norway) Vipers Kristiansand
9	LB	Melissa Petrén	18 January 1995 (aged 27)	1.73 m	56	108	(Denmark) Viborg HK
15	RW	Sara Johansson	2 October 1992 (aged 30)	1.76 m	9	22	(Sweden) Skara HF
16	GK	Jessica Ryde	18 May 1994 (aged 28)	1.85 m	47	0	(Denmark) Ikast Håndbold
17	RB	Nina Dano	12 June 2000 (aged 22)	1.72 m	34	68	(Denmark) HH Elite
19	P	Anna Lagerquist	16 October 1993 (aged 29)	1.75 m	95	118	(France) Neptunes de Nantes
21	GK	Evelina Eriksson	20 August 1996 (aged 26)	1.85 m	10	1	(Romania) CSM București
23	CB	Emma Lindqvist	17 September 1997 (aged 25)	1.77 m	59	119	(Denmark) Ikast Håndbold
24	RW	Nathalie Hagman	19 July 1991 (aged 31)	1.67 m	191	667	(France) Neptunes de Nantes
29	LB	Kristin Thorleifsdóttir	13 January 1998 (aged 24)	1.82 m	31	42	(Denmark) HH Elite
38	LW	Elin Hansson	7 August 1996 (aged 26)	1.73 m	43	110	(Romania) SCM Râmnicu Vâlcea
42	CB	Jenny Carlson	17 April 1995 (aged 27)	1.72 m	30	74	(France) Brest Bretagne
44	CB	Daniela de Jong	1 September 1998 (aged 24)	1.75 m	13	17	(Romania) SCM Râmnicu Vâlcea
54	LB	Tyra Axnér	18 March 2002 (aged 20)	1.78 m	5	8	(Denmark) Nykøbing Falster
55	RW	Clara Petersson Bergsten	28 May 2002 (aged 20)	1.62 m	2	2	(Sweden) Skuru IK
66	P	Clara Monti Danielsson	30 January 1992 (aged 30)	1.76 m	11	4	(France) Chambray Touraine
97	LW	Linn Hansson	18 September 1997 (aged 25)	1.69 m	2	1	(Sweden) Önnereds HK

== Group C ==
=== France ===
A 20-player squad was announced on 11 October 2022. On 24 October 2022, it was announced that Laura Glauser had to withdraw from the competition due to a back injury: she was replaced by Camille Depuiset. The final squad was revealed on 2 November 2022.

Head coach: Olivier Krumbholz

No.	Pos.	Name	Date of birth (age)	Height	App.	Goals	Club
3	RW	Alicia Toublanc	3 May 1996 (aged 26)	1.70 m	19	52	(France) Brest Bretagne Handball
4	RW	Pauline Coatanea	6 July 1993 (aged 29)	1.65 m	62	100	(France) Brest Bretagne Handball
6	LW	Chloé Valentini	19 April 1995 (aged 27)	1.65 m	57	118	(France) Metz Handball
8	LW	Coralie Lassource	1 September 1992 (aged 30)	1.70 m	58	96	(France) Brest Bretagne Handball
10	CB	Grâce Zaadi	7 July 1993 (aged 29)	1.71 m	158	313	(Romania) CSM București
12	GK	Floriane André	30 May 2000 (aged 22)	1.84 m	2	1	(France) Neptunes de Nantes
16	GK	Cléopatre Darleux	1 July 1989 (aged 33)	1.75 m	193	5	(France) Brest Bretagne Handball
17	LB	Audrey Dembele	10 March 2001 (aged 21)	1.83 m	2	5	(France) ESBF Besançon
19	RB	Océane Sercien-Ugolin	15 December 1997 (aged 24)	1.75 m	49	89	(Norway) Vipers Kristiansand
20	RB	Laura Flippes	13 December 1994 (aged 27)	1.71 m	103	195	(France) Paris 92
21	LB	Orlane Kanor	16 June 1997 (aged 25)	1.78 m	61	98	(Romania) CS Rapid București
22	LB	Tamara Horacek	5 November 1995 (aged 26)	1.78 m	52	57	(France) Metz Handball
23	LB	Déborah Lassource	29 September 1999 (aged 23)	1.72 m	7	7	(France) Paris 92
24	P	Béatrice Edwige	3 October 1988 (aged 34)	1.82 m	144	106	(Hungary) Ferencvárosi TC
26	P	Pauletta Foppa	22 December 2000 (aged 21)	1.77 m	59	143	(France) Brest Bretagne Handball
27	CB	Estelle Nze Minko	11 August 1991 (aged 31)	1.78 m	156	259	(Hungary) Győri Audi ETO KC
29	P	Oriane Ondono	14 April 1996 (aged 26)	1.80 m	7	10	(France) Neptunes de Nantes
30	GK	Camille Depuiset	19 October 1998 (aged 24)	1.78 m	1	0	(France) Metz Handball
31	RW	Lucie Granier	11 May 1999 (aged 23)	1.67 m	16	26	(France) ESBF Besançon
34	CB	Léna Grandveau	21 January 2003 (aged 19)	1.71 m	1	2	(France) Neptunes de Nantes

=== Netherlands ===
The squad was announced on 17 October 2022.

Head coach: Per Johansson

No.	Pos.	Name	Date of birth (age)	Height	App.	Goals	Club
3	GK	Claudia Rompen	27 January 1997 (aged 25)	1.78 m	4	0	(Denmark) HH Elite
6	RB	Laura van der Heijden	27 June 1990 (aged 32)	1.73 m	254	764	(France) Chambray Touraine Handball
7	RW	Debbie Bont	9 December 1990 (aged 31)	1.75 m	209	412	(France) Metz Handball
11	P	Pipy Wolfs	26 April 2002 (aged 20)	1.73 m	5	3	(Spain) CB Elche
12	LW	Bo van Wetering	5 October 1999 (aged 23)	1.71 m	58	185	(Denmark) Odense Håndbold
17	LB	Catharina Molenaar	28 April 2002 (aged 20)	1.77 m	7	4	(Denmark) København Håndbold
18	LB	Kelly Dulfer	21 March 1994 (aged 28)	1.85 m	155	228	(Germany) SG BBM Bietigheim
19	P	Merel Freriks	6 January 1998 (aged 24)	1.75 m	68	98	(France) Brest Bretagne Handball
20	CB	Inger Smits	17 September 1994 (aged 28)	1.79 m	68	113	(Germany) SG BBM Bietigheim
22	LW	Zoë Sprengers	19 January 2000 (aged 22)	1.66 m	25	43	(Germany) Bayer Leverkusen
26	RW	Angela Malestein	31 January 1993 (aged 29)	1.73 m	179	468	(Hungary) FTC Rail-Cargo Hungaria
28	P	Nikita van der Vliet	14 March 2000 (aged 22)	1.72 m	20	22	(Denmark) Nykøbing Falster Håndboldklub
30	GK	Rinka Duijndam	8 June 1997 (aged 25)	1.78 m	56	0	(Norway) Sola HK
31	RW	Kelly Vollebregt	1 January 1995 (aged 27)	1.65 m	26	48	(Denmark) Odense Håndbold
38	GK	Yara ten Holte	23 November 1999 (aged 22)	1.75 m	20	0	(Germany) Borussia Dortmund
42	LB	Harma van Kreij	11 November 1993 (aged 28)	1.75 m	12	11	(Germany) Borussia Dortmund
44	CB	Maxime Struijs	24 March 1994 (aged 28)	1.74 m	14	10	(Germany) HSG Bad Wildungen
48	RB	Dione Housheer	26 September 1999 (aged 23)	1.80 m	60	160	(Denmark) Odense Håndbold
79	CB	Estavana Polman	5 August 1992 (aged 30)	1.74 m	161	571	(Denmark) Nykøbing Falster Håndboldklub

=== North Macedonia ===
A 19-player squad was announced on 18 October 2022.

Head coach: Ljubomir Savevski

No.	Pos.	Name	Date of birth (age)	Height	App.	Goals	Club
1	GK	Matea Churlinovska	6 December 2005 (aged 16)	1.73 m	0	0	(North Macedonia) WHC Despina
2	LW	Anastasija Nikolovska	12 August 1998 (aged 24)	1.67 m	0	0	(North Macedonia) ŽRK Vardar
5	LB	Aleksandra Kolovska	23 February 2004 (aged 18)	1.73 m	0	0	(North Macedonia) ŽRK Metalurg
10	CB	Monika Janeska	17 May 1993 (aged 29)	1.73 m	19	41	(Turkey) Konyaaltı Belediye Spor
11	RB	Marija Guguljanova	11 November 1999 (aged 22)	1.73 m	1	0	(North Macedonia) ŽRK Metalurg
13	P	Aleksandra Kolovska	23 February 2004 (aged 18)	1.73 m	3	0	(North Macedonia) ŽRK Metalurg
14	P	Ivana Djatevska	13 April 2003 (aged 19)	1.79 m	13	2	(North Macedonia) ŽRK Vardar
16	GK	Marija Jovanovska	30 August 2004 (aged 18)	1.80 m	2	0	(North Macedonia) ŽRK Kumanovo
23	LB	Angela Jankulovska	27 July 2002 (aged 20)	1.76 m	8	12	(North Macedonia) ŽRK Vardar
26	GK	Jovana Micevska	26 July 2000 (aged 22)	1.76 m	11	1	(France) OGC Nice
30	RB	Jovana Kiprijanovska	30 December 2001 (aged 20)	1.84 m	9	5	(France) Sambre-Avesnois Handball
32	CB	Ivana Arsenievska	8 December 2003 (aged 18)	1.75 m	3	0	(North Macedonia) ŽRK Metalurg
33	RW	Sara Ristovska	9 September 1996 (aged 26)	1.69 m	46	223	(Russia) CSKA Moscow
43	LW	Emilijana Rizoska	21 May 2005 (aged 17)	1.62 m	3	1	(North Macedonia) WHC Gjorche Petrov
58	LB	Simona Madjovska	2 November 1993 (aged 29)	1.81 m	30	51	(Germany) BSV Sachsen Zwickau
71	LW	Jovana Sazdovska	27 June 1993 (aged 29)	1.77 m	36	93	(Romania) HC Dunărea Brăila
77	P	Sanja Dabevska	4 March 1996 (aged 26)	1.85 m	11	15	(Croatia) RK Lokomotiva Zagreb
88	CB	Leonida Gichevska	20 June 1998 (aged 24)	1.78 m	17	36	(Croatia) RK Lokomotiva Zagreb
91	RB	Iva Mladenovska	14 January 2007 (aged 15)	1.80 m	2	0	(North Macedonia) ŽRK Metalurg

=== Romania ===
The squad was announced on 19 October 2022.

Head coach: Florentin Pera

No.	Pos.	Name	Date of birth (age)	Height	App.	Goals	Club
4	CB	Laura Pristăviță	20 July 1989 (aged 33)	1.75 m	28	17	(Romania) Gloria Bistrița
7	CB	Eliza Buceschi	1 August 1993 (aged 29)	1.77 m	86	207	(Romania) Rapid București
8	LB	Cristina Neagu	26 August 1988 (aged 34)	1.80 m	207	894	(Romania) CSM București
9	LW	Ana Maria Tănasie	6 April 1995 (aged 27)	1.73 m	15	14	(Romania) Minaur Baia Mare
12	GK	Diana Ciucă	1 June 2000 (aged 22)	1.80 m	22	0	(Romania) Rapid București
14	LB	Bianca Bazaliu	30 July 1997 (aged 25)	1.83 m	12	21	(Romania) Gloria Bistrița
20	GK	Iulia Dumanska	15 August 1996 (aged 26)	1.78 m	63	0	(Romania) Gloria Bistrița
21	LW	Alexandra Dindiligan	16 February 1997 (aged 25)	1.74 m	14	23	(Romania) CSM București
22	RW	Alexandra Badea	22 May 1998 (aged 24)	1.77 m	9	11	(Romania) Rapid București
23	P	Andreea Țîrle	2 April 2002 (aged 20)	1.77 m	0	0	(Romania) Minaur Baia Mare
27	P	Lorena Ostase	11 September 1997 (aged 25)	1.79 m	28	31	(Romania) Rapid București
28	LB	Diana Lixăndroiu	14 August 2005 (aged 17)	1.84 m	0	0	(Romania) CSM Slatina
30	RW	Sonia Seraficeanu	27 July 1997 (aged 25)	1.74 m	18	21	(Romania) Gloria Bistrița
32	RW	Mihaela Mihai	15 December 2004 (aged 17)	1.78 m	0	0	(Romania) CSM București
77	P	Crina Pintea	3 April 1990 (aged 32)	1.92 m	103	172	(Romania) CSM București
89	LW	Corina Lupei	12 July 2002 (aged 20)	1.75 m	0	0	(Romania) SCM Râmnicu Vâlcea
98	GK	Daciana Hosu	16 January 1998 (aged 24)	1.81 m	17	0	(Romania) SCM Râmnicu Vâlcea
99	LB	Sorina Grozav	27 May 1999 (aged 23)	1.75 m	7	19	(Romania) Rapid București

== Group D ==
=== Germany ===
The squad was announced on 13 October 2022. Malina Marie Michalczik and Antje Döll got injured before the tournament and were replaced by Alexia Hauf.

Head coach: Markus Gaugisch

No.	Pos.	Name	Date of birth (age)	Height	App.	Goals	Club
4	CB	Alina Grijseels	12 April 1996 (aged 26)	1.75 m	58	145	(Germany) Borussia Dortmund
7	P	Meike Schmelzer	19 July 1993 (aged 29)	1.80 m	78	111	(Romania) HC Dunărea Brăila
9	P	Lisa Antl	21 June 2000 (aged 22)	1.74 m	18	12	(Germany) Borussia Dortmund
11	LB	Xenia Smits	22 April 1994 (aged 28)	1.85 m	89	198	(Germany) SG BBM Bietigheim
13	CB	Silje Brøns Petersen	5 December 1994 (aged 27)	1.73 m	17	17	(Denmark) København Håndbold
16	GK	Isabell Roch	26 July 1990 (aged 32)	1.74 m	44	0	(Romania) SCM Râmnicu Vâlcea
18	CB	Mia Zschocke	28 May 1998 (aged 24)	1.78 m	48	32	(Norway) Storhamar HE
19	RW	Maike Schirmer	25 May 1990 (aged 32)	1.63 m	22	32	(Germany) VfL Oldenburg
20	LB	Emily Bölk	26 April 1998 (aged 24)	1.82 m	81	241	(Hungary) Ferencvárosi TC
22	RB	Maren Weigel	22 May 1994 (aged 28)	1.77 m	43	45	(Germany) TuS Metzingen
23	LB	Annika Lott	7 December 1999 (aged 22)	1.80 m	7	2	(Germany) Thüringer HC
25	LB	Lena Degenhardt	31 May 1999 (aged 23)	1.78 m	15	10	(Germany) TuS Metzingen
27	RB	Julia Maidhof	13 March 1998 (aged 24)	1.76 m	33	107	(Germany) SG BBM Bietigheim
30	RW	Jenny Behrend	20 January 1996 (aged 26)	1.70 m	28	37	(Germany) SG BBM Bietigheim
31	LW	Alexia Hauf	18 July 1998 (aged 24)	1.62 m	1	3	(Germany) HSG Blomberg-Lippe
33	P	Luisa Schulze	14 September 1990 (aged 32)	1.90 m	126	160	(Germany) Neckarsulmer SU
39	P	Maxi Mühlner	3 February 2001 (aged 21)	1.78 m	0	0	(Germany) Buxtehuder SV
42	GK	Katharina Filter	4 February 1999 (aged 23)	1.80 m	21	2	(Denmark) København Håndbold
95	LW	Johanna Stockschläder	11 February 1995 (aged 27)	1.71 m	22	63	(Germany) Neckarsulmer SU

=== Montenegro ===
The squad was announced on 24 October 2022.

Head coach: Bojana Popović

No.	Pos.	Name	Date of birth (age)	Height	App.	Goals	Club
1	GK	Marina Rajčić	24 August 1993 (aged 29)	1.78 m	136	4	(Hungary) Siófok KC
4	RW	Jovanka Radičević	23 October 1986 (aged 36)	1.69 m	185	1060	(Slovenia) RK Krim
7	LW	Nađa Kadović	28 August 2003 (aged 19)	1.80 m	5	0	(Montenegro) ŽRK Budućnost Podgorica
9	LB	Đurđina Jauković	24 February 1997 (aged 25)	1.86 m	80	278	(France) Brest Bretagne Handball
10	CB	Matea Pletikosić	24 April 1998 (aged 24)	1.68 m	28	27	(Montenegro) ŽRK Budućnost Podgorica
11	P	Ivana Godeč	11 May 2001 (aged 21)	1.77 m	11	3	(Montenegro) ŽRK Budućnost Podgorica
16	GK	Ljubica Nenezić	15 January 1997 (aged 25)	1.81 m	50	1	(Romania) SCM Gloria Buzău
21	LW	Nina Bulatović	9 December 1996 (aged 25)	1.71 m	16	1	(Montenegro) ŽRK Budućnost Podgorica
22	LB	Andrijana Popović	20 April 2002 (aged 20)	1.85 m	6	0	(Montenegro) ŽRK Budućnost Podgorica
25	RB	Đurđina Malović	5 May 1996 (aged 26)	1.82 m	31	37	(France) Toulon
26	CB	Nataša Ćorović	7 May 1999 (aged 23)	1.73 m	13	7	(Montenegro) ŽRK Budućnost Podgorica
34	P	Tatjana Brnović	9 November 1998 (aged 23)	1.84 m	52	125	(France) Brest Bretagne Handball
43	GK	Marta Batinović	20 April 1990 (aged 32)	1.85 m	25	1	(Romania) SCM Gloria Buzău
66	P	Ema Alivodić	28 November 1996 (aged 25)	1.87 m	84	95	(Romania) CSM București
90	CB	Milena Raičević	12 March 1990 (aged 32)	1.78 m	157	489	(Montenegro) ŽRK Budućnost Podgorica
91	LW	Ivona Pavićević	21 April 1996 (aged 26)	1.67 m	58	55	(Montenegro) ŽRK Budućnost Podgorica
95	CB	Ilda Kepić	17 January 1995 (aged 27)	1.82 m	5	2	(Montenegro) ŽRK Budućnost Podgorica
96	CB	Itana Grbić	1 September 1996 (aged 26)	1.71 m	77	138	(France) Brest Bretagne Handball

=== Poland ===
The squad was announced on 11 October 2022.

Head coach: (Norway) Arne Senstad

No.	Pos.	Name	Date of birth (age)	Height	App.	Goals	Club
4	P	Aleksandra Olek	31 October 2000 (aged 22)	1.79 m	0	0	(Poland) KPR Kobierzyce
6	CB	Emilia Galińska	26 December 1992 (aged 29)	1.75 m	18	8	(Poland) MKS Zagłębie Lubin
7	RW	Aneta Łabuda	7 January 1995 (aged 27)	1.60 m	54	111	(Poland) MKS Zagłębie Lubin
8	RB	Monika Kobylińska	9 April 1995 (aged 27)	1.77 m	83	255	(France) Brest Bretagne Handball
9	RW	Magda Balsam	20 June 1996 (aged 26)	1.72 m	21	44	(Germany) TuS Metzingen
11	LW	Mariola Wiertelak	8 October 1991 (aged 31)	1.62 m	5	15	(Poland) KPR Kobierzyce
13	P	Sylwia Matuszczyk	11 June 1992 (aged 30)	1.73 m	35	62	(Poland) Eurobud JKS Jarosław
16	GK	Adrianna Płaczek	10 December 1993 (aged 28)	1.74 m	72	0	(France) Neptunes de Nantes
21	GK	Barbara Zima	14 January 2000 (aged 22)	1.89 m	15	1	(Poland) KPR Kobierzyce
22	LB	Aleksandra Rosiak	7 July 1997 (aged 25)	1.82 m	43	85	(Slovenia) RK Krim
39	RB	Natalia Nosek	20 April 1998 (aged 24)	1.79 m	37	72	(France) ESBF Besançon
40	LW	Daria Michalak	12 December 1995 (aged 26)	1.71 m	27	43	(Poland) MKS Zagłębie Lubin
49	LB	Karolina Kochaniak	5 July 1995 (aged 27)	1.75 m	19	24	(Poland) MKS Zagłębie Lubin
66	P	Joanna Andruszak	2 April 1994 (aged 28)	1.85 m	55	72	(Poland) MKS Lublin
89	CB	Kinga Achruk	9 September 1989 (aged 33)	1.81 m	204	558	(Poland) MKS Lublin
96	LW	Dagmara Nocuń	2 January 1996 (aged 26)	1.66 m	33	50	(Germany) TuS Metzingen
99	GK	Monika Maliczkiewicz	15 April 1988 (aged 34)	1.78 m	33	1	(Poland) MKS Zagłębie Lubin

=== Spain ===
The squad was announced on 17 October 2022.

Head coach: José Ignacio Prades

No.	Pos.	Name	Date of birth (age)	Height	App.	Goals	Club
6	LB	Carmen Campos	10 July 1995 (aged 27)	1.71 m	39	102	(France) Jeanne d'Arc Dijon Handball
7	CB	Esther Arrojeria	1 January 1997 (aged 25)	1.64 m	7	22	(Spain) BM Bera Bera
8	CB	Silvia Arderíus	11 July 1990 (aged 32)	1.68 m	72	71	(Spain) CBF Málaga Costa del Sol
12	GK	Silvia Navarro	20 March 1979 (aged 43)	1.70 m	245	12	(Spain) BM Remudas
16	GK	Mercedes Castellanos	21 July 1988 (aged 34)	1.84 m	69	2	(Spain) CBF Málaga Costa del Sol
17	LW	Jennifer Gutiérrez Bermejo	20 February 1995 (aged 27)	1.69 m	78	173	(Romania) CS Rapid București
18	RW	Maitane Etxeberria	15 January 1997 (aged 25)	1.68 m	56	102	(Spain) BM Bera Bera
22	LB	Lara González Ortega	22 February 1992 (aged 30)	1.84 m	147	166	(France) Paris 92
23	P	Alba Spugnini	30 June 2000 (aged 22)	1.81 m	5	8	(Spain) BM Remudas
30	LW	Soledad López	4 April 1992 (aged 30)	1.62 m	66	139	(Spain) CBF Málaga Costa del Sol
33	P	Kaba Gassama	16 August 1997 (aged 25)	1.80 m	37	44	(Germany) SG BBM Bietigheim
34	CB	Alicia Fernández	21 December 1992 (aged 29)	1.72 m	74	168	(Romania) CS Rapid București
39	RB	Almudena Rodríguez	9 November 1993 (aged 28)	1.75 m	94	177	(Spain) BM Remudas
41	GK	Nicole Wiggins Sancho	9 August 2000 (aged 22)	1.78 m	9	0	(Spain) BM Granollers
45	GK	Maddi Aalla	1 January 1997 (aged 25)	1.73 m	5	0	(Spain) BM Bera Bera
51	RB	Irene Espínola	19 December 1992 (aged 29)	1.84 m	15	7	(Romania) CS Rapid București
57	RW	Paula Valdivia	23 December 1995 (aged 26)	1.69 m	35	51	(Spain) BM La Calzada
61	P	Lysa Tchaptchet	20 December 2001 (aged 20)	1.83 m	16	11	(Norway) Vipers Kristiansand
62	RB	Paula Arcos	21 December 2001 (aged 20)	1.66 m	25	45	(Spain) CB Atlético Guardés
86	LB	Alexandrina Cabral	5 May 1986 (aged 36)	1.75 m	143	657	(Spain) BM Morvedre

== Statistics ==
=== Coaches representation by country ===
Coaches in bold represent their own country.

Rank	Country	Coaches
2	Denmark	**Jesper Jensen**, Martin Albertsen (Switzerland)
2	Montenegro	**Bojana Popović**, Dragan Adžić (Slovenia)
2	Sweden	**Tomas Axnér**, Per Johansson (Netherlands)
1	Croatia	**Nenad Šoštarić**
1	France	**Olivier Krumbholz**
1	Germany	**Markus Gaugisch**
1	Hungary	**Vladimir Golovin**
1	Iceland	Thorir Hergeirsson (Norway)
1	North Macedonia	**Ljubomir Savevski**
1	Norway	**Arne Senstad** (Poland)
1	Slovenia	Uroš Bregar (Serbia)
1	Spain	**José Ignacio Prades**
1	Romania	**Florentin Pera**
