= Maryam Garba =

French handball player (born 1995)

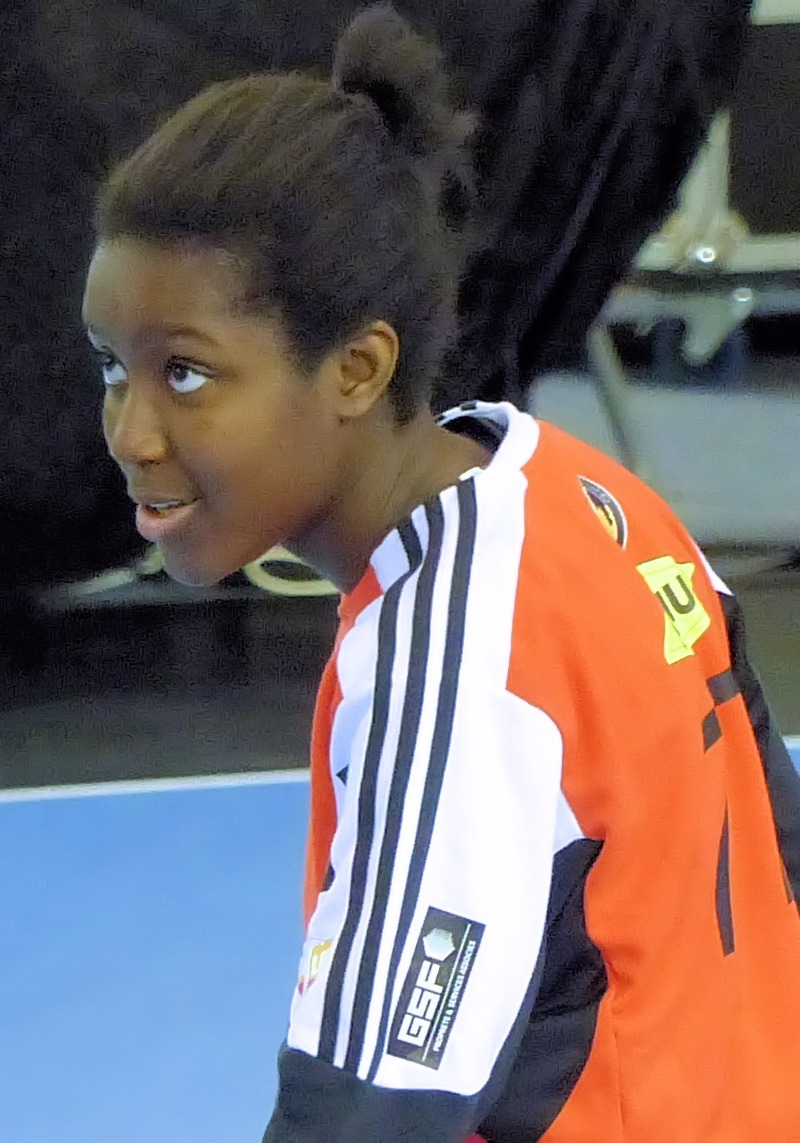
- Garba in 2014

Personal information
- Full name: Maryam Garba
- Nationality: French
- Born: 7 August 1995 (age 31) Paris, France
- Height: 184 cm (72 in)

Sport
- Sport: Handball
- Position: Goalkeeper
- Current club: Paris 92
- Number: 77

Senior clubs
- Years: Team
- 2013–2017: Issy-Paris Hand
- 2017–2019: Le Havre AC
- 2019-: Paris 92

Maryam Garba (born 7 August 1995) is a handball goalkeeper from France who plays for Paris 92. Her team placed second at the 2012/13 Cup Winners' Cup and 2013/14 Challenge Cup.
