= Chambray Touraine Handball =

French handball club

- Full name: Chambray Touraine Handball
- Founded: 2006
- Arena: Gymnase de la Fontaine Blanche, Chambray-lès-Tours
- Capacity: 500
- President: Yves Guérin
- Head coach: Mathieu Lanfranchi
- League: French Women's First League
- 2024–25: 4th
- Club colours

Chambray Touraine Handball is the name of a French handball club from Chambray-lès-Tours. This team currently competes in the French Women's Handball First League from 2016.

Location of Chambray Touraine Handball

== History of the club ==
In 1994, Chambray sports club, set up a new section, Handball enriches the sports club with 1 team senior men. 2006–2007, the Chambray club set up an agreement with the women's section of the St Cyr sur Loire club. Thus, a large number of women come to join the club, with in particular the pennant team: the senior women, then evolving in National 3 under the direction of Marques Guillaume (coach). Phillipe Hualt chaired the club from 2006 to 2010. This was then taken over by Gérald Minard from 2010 to 2015. In March 2015, Yves Guérin took over as club chair and appointed Christophe Bouhour professional team manager.

Since 2014, the club has given itself the means to access the French elite by recruiting many recognized players, such as Sophie Herbrecht, Ionela Stanca-Gâlcă first, then Linda Pradel, Koumba Cissé or Ana de Sousa in the summer of 2015.

Second in the 2015–2016 season in Division 2, Chambray accedes for the first time in its history to the elite of French women's handball.

The 2016–2017 season is the club's first in the first division. After a difficult start, Chambray won the first match in its history in LFH on the eighth day at home against Brest Bretagne Handball. From then on, the promoted followed a series of nine victories in fourteen meetings allowing them to finish in sixth place in the ranking with a record of nine wins, two draws and nine losses. In the playoffs, Chambray was eliminated in the quarterfinals by Brest.

The club competed in the group stage of the 2021–22 Women's EHF European League for the first time.

Season by season review
Season	Div	Clas	Vic	Nul	Déf	Playoffs	France Cup	Coach
2009–2010	3 National 1		?	?	?	–	?	Guillaume Marquès
2010–2011	2 Division 2		?	?	?	–	?	Guillaume Marquès
2011–2012	2 Division 2		?	?	?	–	?	Guillaume Marquès
2012–2013	2 Division 2	6th	14	2	10	–	Round 4	Guillaume Marquès
2013–2014	2 Division 2	4th	14	2	6	–	16th final	Guillaume Marquès
2014–2015	2 Division 2	5th	12	2	8	–	8th final	Guillaume Marquès
2015–2016	2 Division 2	2nd	16	4	2	–	8th final	Guillaume Marquès
2016–2017	1 Division 1	6th	9	2	9	Quarter-final	8th final	Guillaume Marquès
2017–2018	1 Division 1	8th	7	1	14	Quarter-final	Quarter-finals	Guillaume Marquès
2018–2019	1 Division 1	7th	7	4	11	Quarter-final:	8th fina	Guillaume Marquès

== Team ==
=== Current squad ===
Squad for the 2025–26 season

Goalkeepers

- 30 (Netherlands) Rinka Duijndam
- 70 (France) Emma Perche

Wingers
LW

- 2 (France) Constance Mauny
- 5 (France) Mara Vama

RW

- 84 (France) Melvine Deba

Line players

- 8 (Sweden) Vilma Matthijs Holmberg
- 20 (France) Maëlle Faynel

Back players
LB

- 33 (Serbia) Jovana Stoiljković
- (France) Ylana Richard

CB

- 6 (Sweden) Carin Strömberg
- 10 (France) Lucie Modenel
- 78 (France) Manon Grimaud

RB

- 15 (France) Yaëlle Morvan
- 63 (France) Eva Jarrige

=== Transfers ===
Transfers for the 2026–27 season

Joining

- (France) Coura Kanouté (LB) (from (France) Paris 92)
- (France) Helena Mathon (P) (from (France) Handball Plan-de-Cuques)

Leaving

- (France) Maëlle Faynel (P) (to (Denmark) Holstebro Håndbold)

== Notable players ==
- (France) Sophie Herbrecht
- (France) Blandine Dancette
- (France) Linda Pradel
- (France) Camille Aoustin
- (France) Constance Mauny
- (France) Stella Baudouin
- (France) Mariama Signaté
- (France) Koumba Cissé
- (Romania) Ionela Stanca
- (Spain) Nely Carla Alberto
- (Brazil) Ana Paula Belo
- (Hungary) Szimonetta Planéta
- (Netherlands) Anouk Nieuwenweg
- (Norway) Rikke Granlund
- (Denmark) Ida Lagerbon
