= Rikke Petersen-Schmidt =

Danish handball player (born 1975)

Rikke Schmidt
Personal information
- Full name: Rikke Petersen-Schmidt
- Nationality: Danish
- Born: 14 January 1975 (age 51) Aarhus, Denmark
- Height: 184 cm (72 in)

Sport
- Sport: Handball
- Position: Goalkeeper

Youth career
- Years: Team
- 1981-1991: HK 71 Egernsund

Senior clubs
- Years: Team
- 1991-1995: Vidar Sønderborg
- 1995-2002: Kolding IF
- 2002-2005: Slagelse FH
- 2005-2006: Aalborg DH
- 2006-2007: Ikast-Bording EH
- 2007: KIF Kolding
- 2012-2013: Team Esbjerg
- 2013-??: KIF Kolding
- 2019-2020: Horsens HK
National team
Years	Team	Apps	(Gls)
1999-2006	Denmark	104	(0)
Medal record
Women's handball
Representing Denmark
Olympic Games
Gold medal – first place	2000 Sydney	Team
Gold medal – first place	2004 Athens	Team
European Championship
Silver medal – second place	2004 Hungary	Team competition

Rikke Petersen-Schmidt (born 14 January 1975) is a Danish former team handball player and two times Olympic champion. She played as a goalkeeper.

During her national team career she managed to play 104 games for the Danish National team from 1999 to 2006. She received a gold medal with the Danish national team both at the 2000 Summer Olympics in Sydney, and at the 2004 Summer Olympics in Athens.

== Career ==
Rikke Schmidt started playing handball at HK 71 Egernsund. At the age of 16 she moved to Vidar Sønderborg, where she played until she was 20. Her top level career started at KIF Kolding. While she played at Kolding, she debuted for the national team in 1999, and was part of the 2000 Olympics gold winning team.

In 2002 she transferred to Slagelse FH, where she won the EHF Cup in 2003 followed by winning both Danish League and the EHF Champions League back-to-back in 2004 and 2005.

In 2005 she joined Aalborg DH for a season, before joining Ikast-Bording EH. She retired in 2007, but decided to unretire to join KIF Kolding when Christine Lindemann was hit by injuries.

In November 2012 she unretired for a second time to join Team Esbjerg, this time to replace Kari Aalvik Grimsbø and Marie Staun, who were both on maternity leave. In 2013 she rejoined KIF Kolding that had fallen to the 2. Division, the third highest tier in Denmark.

A third time she would rejoin the professional handball world, when she joined Horsens HK in 2019, when Claudia Rompen was injured. In 2020 she retired from professional handball for the fourth time.

After her playing career she has taken an education as a physiotherapist.
