= Koumba Cissé =

French handball player (born 1991)

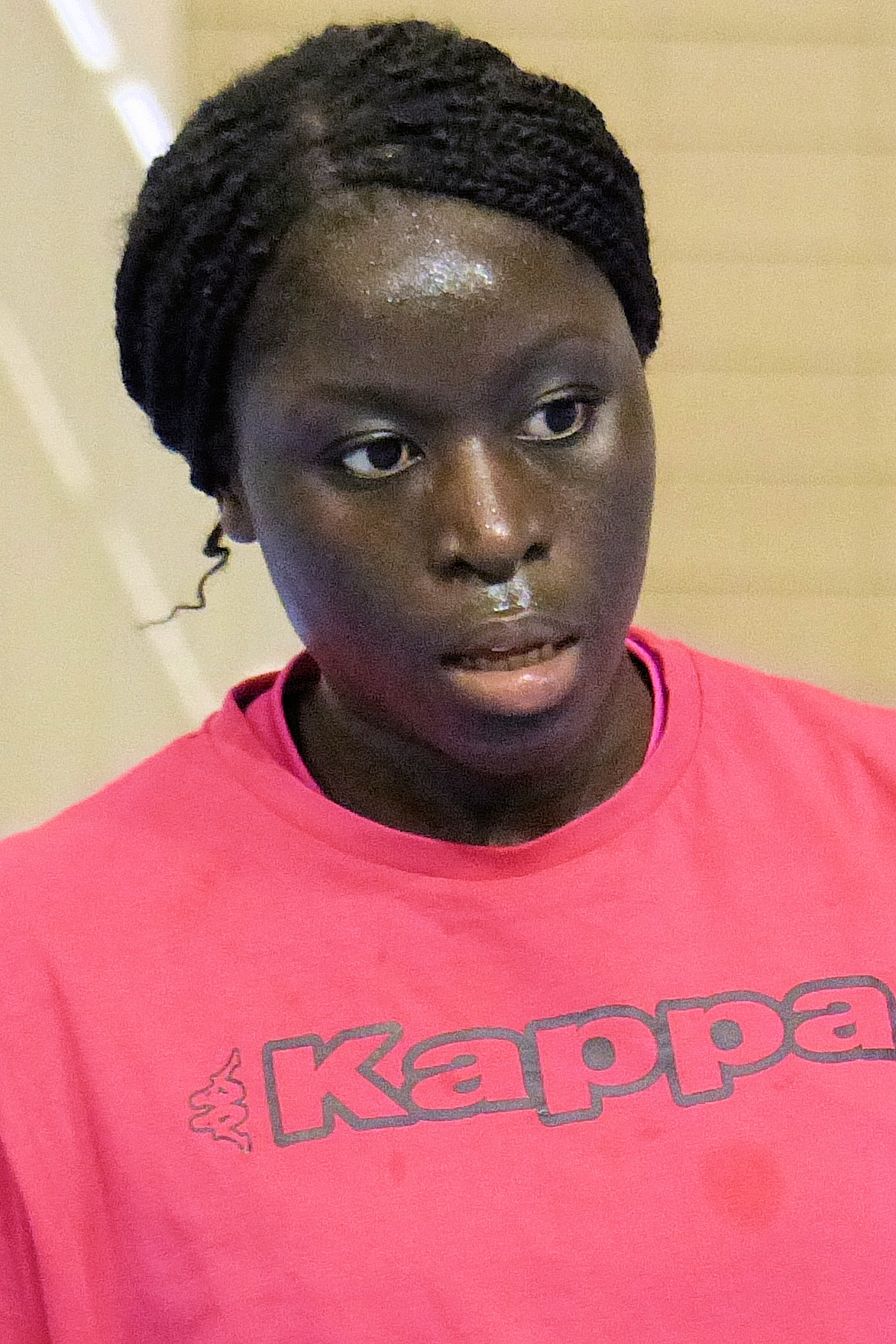
- Cissé (2014)

Personal information
- Nationality: French
- Born: 4 June 1991 (age 35) Pontoise, France
- Height: 1.73 m (5 ft 8 in)

Sport
- Sport: Handball
- Position: Right back
- Current club: Bron Handball
- Number: 44

Youth career
- Years: Team
- 2002-2009: Cergy-Pontoise Handball 95

Senior clubs
- Years: Team
- 2009-2010: CJF Fleury
- 2010-2011: Metz Handball
- 2011-2014: CJF Fleury
- 2014-2015: Le Havre AC
- 2015-2017: Chambray TH
- 2018: HBCSA Porte du Hainaut
- 2019-: Bron Handball
National team
Years	Team	Apps	(Gls)
2013-	France	19	(22)

Koumba Cissé (born 4 June 1991) is a French handball player. She plays for the club Bron Handball, and on the French national team. She represented France at the 2013 World Women's Handball Championship in Serbia. She has previously played for HBCSA Porte du Hainaut, Chambray TH, Le Havre AC, Metz Handball and CJF Fleury.
