= BK Heid =

Swedish handball club

- Full name: Bollklubben Heid
- Founded: 1946; 80 years ago
- Arena: Heidhallen
- Capacity: 600
- Head coach: Anders Niklasson (women); Magnus Kjell (men)
- League: Allsvenskan (women); Division 3 (men)
Home	Away

Bollklubben Heid, also known as BK Heid, is a handball club from Gothenburg, Sverige, that has seen success in both women's and men's handball.

== History ==
The club was founded in 1946. The men's team played the early years in division 2 and 3, but in the 1980s they managed to be promoted to division 1, which was the second highest tier at the time. The women's team was added in 1960. The women's team reached the top division in 2006.

In the middle of the 2014–15 season the men's team had to close due to economic issues and were thrown out of the Allsvenskan.

In the 2022–23 season the women's team were relegated from the Handbollsligan, getting only two points from 22 matches.

== Notable former players ==
- Anders Bäckegren
- Mikael Mellegård
- Peter Möller
- Annika Fredén
- Linn Hansson
