= Annika Fredén =

Swedish handball player (born 1978)

Personal information
- Full name: Annika Sofia Wiel Hvannberg
- Nationality: Swedish
- Born: 21 August 1978 (age 48) Alingsås, Sweden
- Height: 175 cm (69 in)

Sport
- Sport: Handball
- Position: Right Wing

Senior clubs
- Years: Team
- -2003: BK Heid
- 2003-2005: IK Sävehof
- 2005-2010: Horsens HK
- 2010-2015: BK Heid
National team
Years	Team	Apps	(Gls)
2005-2012	Sweden	120	(316)
Medal record
European Championship
Silver medal – second place	2010 Denmark & Norway

Annika Sofia Wiel Hvannberg née Wiel Fredén(born 21 August 1978) is a Swedish handball player.

She began her career in BK Heid and played for them until she was 25 years. She then changed to IK Sävehof, where she played for three years before she moved to Denmark and became a professional. As a professional, she played for the Danish club Horsens HK and for the Swedish national team. She competed at the 2008 Summer Olympics in China, where the Swedish team placed eighth and at the 2012 Summer Olympics where the Swedish team was 11th. When she returned to Sweden, she again played for her motherclub BK Heid, and also played on centre back and not only right wing as earlier. She stopped her career after season 2014/15.

She played 119 matches for the Swedish national team. She debut in the national team in 2005, and her last match was 2012. In 2006 she was handballer of the year. The greatest achievement in her career was silver medals at the 2010 European Women's Handball Championship. In 2008 she seriously injured her knee. Annika Wiel Hvannberg took part in the 2006 European Championship, the 2008 Olympics, 2010 European Championship, the 2011 World Championship and the 2012 Olympics in London.
