= Monika Maliczkiewicz =

Polish handball player (born 1988)

Personal information
- Nationality: Polish
- Born: 15 April 1988 (age 38) Wrocław, Poland
- Height: 1.78 m (5 ft 10 in)

Sport
- Sport: Handball
- Position: Goalkeeper
- Current club: Metraco Zagłębie Lubin
- Number: 99

Senior clubs
- Years: Team
- 2018-2015: MKS Zagłębie Lubin
- 2015-2016: Handball Cercle Nîmes
- 2016-: MKS Zagłębie Lubin
National team
Years	Team	Apps	(Gls)
2011–	Poland	34	(0)

Monika Maliczkiewicz (born 15 April 1988) is a Polish handballer for Metraco Zagłębie Lubin and the Polish national team.

She participated at the 2021 World Women's Handball Championship in Spain, placing 15th.

== Achievements ==
- Ekstraklasa:
  - Winner: 2009, 2010, 2013, 2014, 2015, 2018, 2019, 2020
- Puchar Polski:
  - Finalist: 2010, 2012, 2018
- EHF Challenge Cup:
  - Winner: 2018
