= AZS-AWFiS Gdańsk (women's handball) =

AZS AWFiS Gdańsk
- Full name: Akademicki Związek Sportowy Akademia Wychowania Fizycznego i Sportu Gdańsk
- Dissolved: May 2017; 8 years ago
- Arena: Hala Widowiskowo-Sportowa AWFiS
- Capacity: 1,531
- League: Superliga
- 2016–17: 7th of 12
- Club colours

AZS-AWFiS Gdańsk were a women's handball club from Gdańsk, Poland.

== History ==
AZS-AWFiS enjoyed success in the early 2000s, finishing in the top 3 in 5 straight seasons between 2001 and 2006, winning in 2003–04, finishing runners-up in 2004–05, and finishing in 3rd place the other 3 seasons. During the clubs most successful years, the team also won the Polish Cup in 2005. ASZ-AWFiS played in European competitions twice, playing in the EHF European Cup, with their greatest success being that the club reached the semi-finals in 2002–03.

AZS-AWFiS continued to play in the highest division in Poland until 2017, when the title sponsor of the club, Łączpol, decided that the sponsoring of the club was not profitable, and that they would be stopping their funding of the club. Due to the club not having the finances to continue, the club dissolved at the end of the 2016–17 season.

== Naming history ==
The club played under many different names due to sponsorship, but are most known for their time when they were sponsored by Nata and thus known as Nata AZS-AWFiS Gdańsk, during which time the club won the Superliga, Polish Cup, and played in the European Cup.

Historic club names include:

- AZS-AWFiS Gdańsk
- Nata AZS-AWFiS Gdańsk
- Dablex AZS-AWFiS Gdańsk
- AZS Łączpol AWFiS Gdańsk

== Honours ==
Superliga

- Winners: 2003–04
- Runners-up: 2004–05, 2007–08
- Third place: 2001–02, 2002–03, 2005–06

Polish Cup

- Winners: 2005

European Cup

- Semi-final: 2002–03
