= Constance Mauny =

French handball player (born 1998)

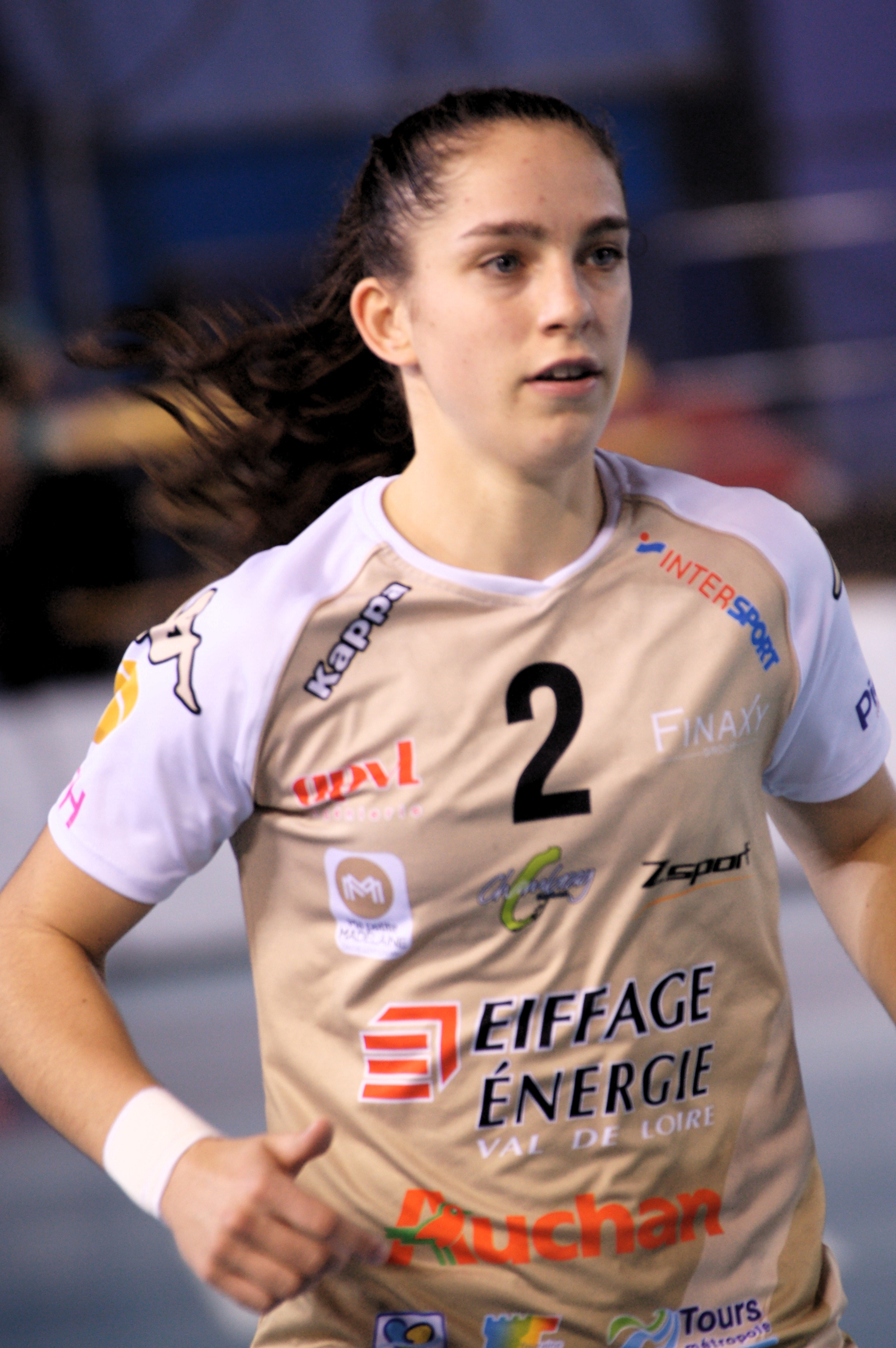

Personal information
- Nationality: French
- Born: 17 December 1998 (age 27) Chambray-lès-Tours, France
- Height: 1.72 m (5 ft 7 1/2 in)

Sport
- Sport: Handball
- Position: Left wing
- Current club: Brest Bretagne
- Number: 2

Senior clubs
- Years: Team
- 2014–2018: Chambray Touraine
- 2018–2024: Brest Bretagne
National team
Years	Team	Apps	(Gls)
2018–	France	3	(3)
Medal record
EHF Junior European Championship
Gold medal – first place	2017 Slovenia

Constance Mauny (born 17 December 1998) is a French female handballer who plays for Brest Bretagne Handball and the French national team as a left winger.

In 2018 she signed for Brest Bretagne Handball from Chambray Touraine to replace the Swedish player Loui Sand, who had left for Fleury Loiret HB.

== Achievements ==
=== Club ===
==== International ====
- EHF Champions League
  - Finalist: 2021 (with Brest Bretagne Handball)

==== Domestic ====
- French league (Division 1 Féminine):
  - Winner (gold) : 2021 (with Brest Bretagne Handball)
  - Tied 1st: 2020 (with Brest Bretagne Handball)
  - Runner up: 2022 (with Brest Bretagne Handball)
  - 3rd: 2019
- French Cup (Coupe de France):
  - Winner (gold) : 2019, 2021 (with Brest Bretagne Handball)

=== National team ===
- European Women's U-19 Handball Championship:
  - Winner (gold) : 2017

== Awards and recognition ==
- Championnat de France Best Hope: 2017
