= Karolina Zalewska =

Polish handball player (born 1984)

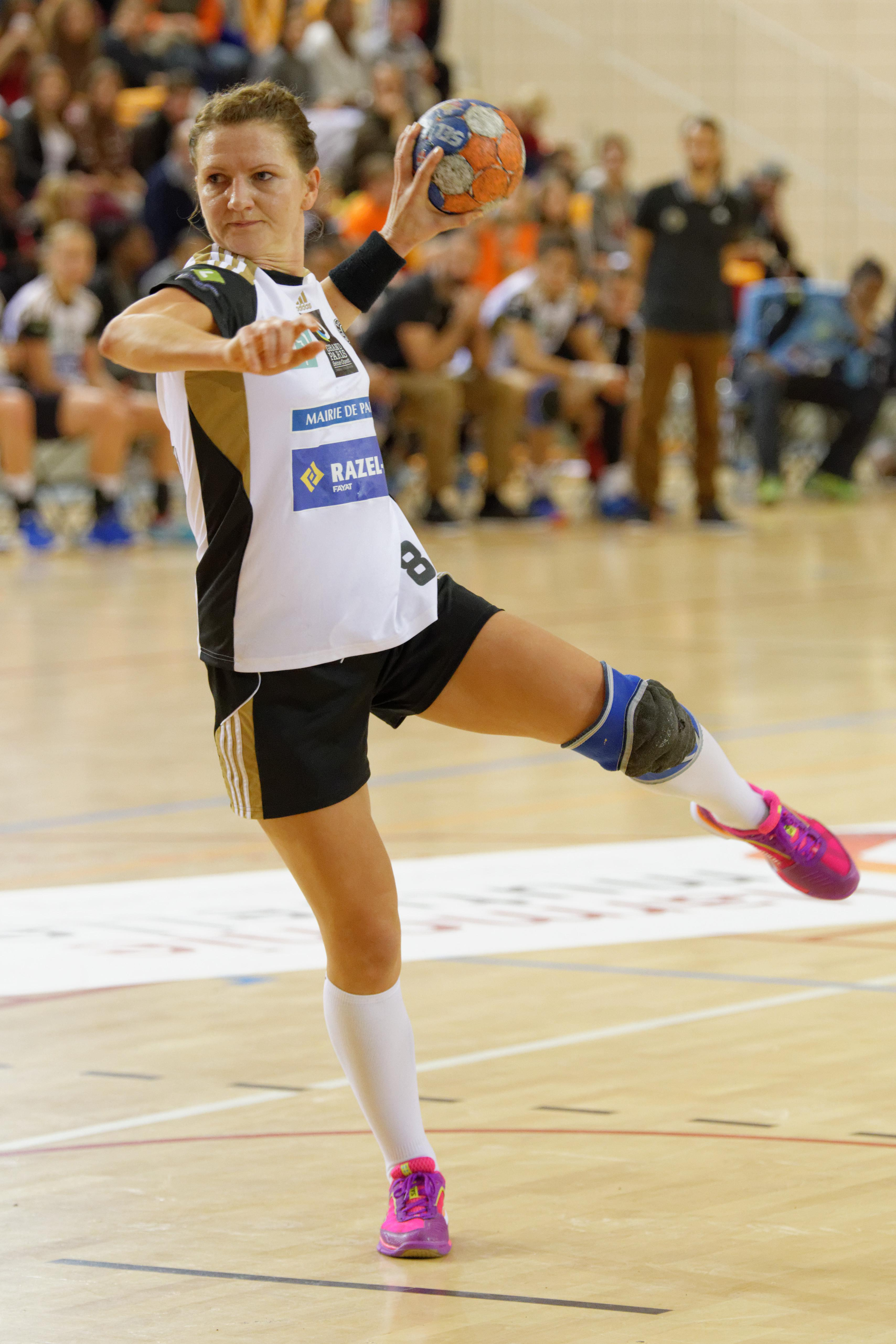
- Zalewska in 2015

Personal information
- Nationality: Polish
- Born: 19 March 1984 (age 42) Warsaw, Poland
- Height: 1.72 m (5 ft 8 in)

Sport
- Sport: Handball
- Position: Right wing
- Current club: Paris 92
- Number: 8

Youth career
- Years: Team
- 1996-1999: HBC Conches
- 1999-2000: Châteauneuf HB

Senior clubs
- Years: Team
- 2000-2008: CJF Fleury
- 2008-2017: Issy Paris Hand
- 2021: Paris 92
National team
Years	Team	Apps	(Gls)
2010-2016	Poland	39	(50)

Karolina Zalewska-Gardoni (born 19 March 1984) is a Polish/French handball player for Paris 92 and the Polish national team.
