= Bożena Karkut =

Polish handball coach (born 1961)

Personal information
- Nationality: Poland
- Born: 30 June 1961 (age 65) Wrocław, Poland

Sport
- Sport: Handball
- Position: Right wing
- Current club: Zagłębie Lubin (manager)

Senior clubs
- Years: Team
- 1975–1985: AZS AWF Wrocław
- 1985–1989: Ślęza Wrocław
- 1989–1990: RK Voždovac
- 1990–1991: Haugerud IF Oslo
- 1991–: IL Vestar
- 1991–1992: Toten HK
- 1993–1996: AZS AWF Wrocław
- 1997–2000: Hypo Niederösterreich
National team
Years	Team	Apps	(Gls)
1981–1993	Poland	151	(539)

Teams managed
- 2000–: Zagłębie Lubin
- 2009: Poland Beach
- 2012: Poland Beach

Bożena Karkut (born 30 June 1961) is a Polish handball player and coach.

At the 1990 World Championship she was the top scorer with 50 goals.

She is manager for Zagłębie Lubin since 2000.
