= Melvine Deba =

French handball player (born 1998)

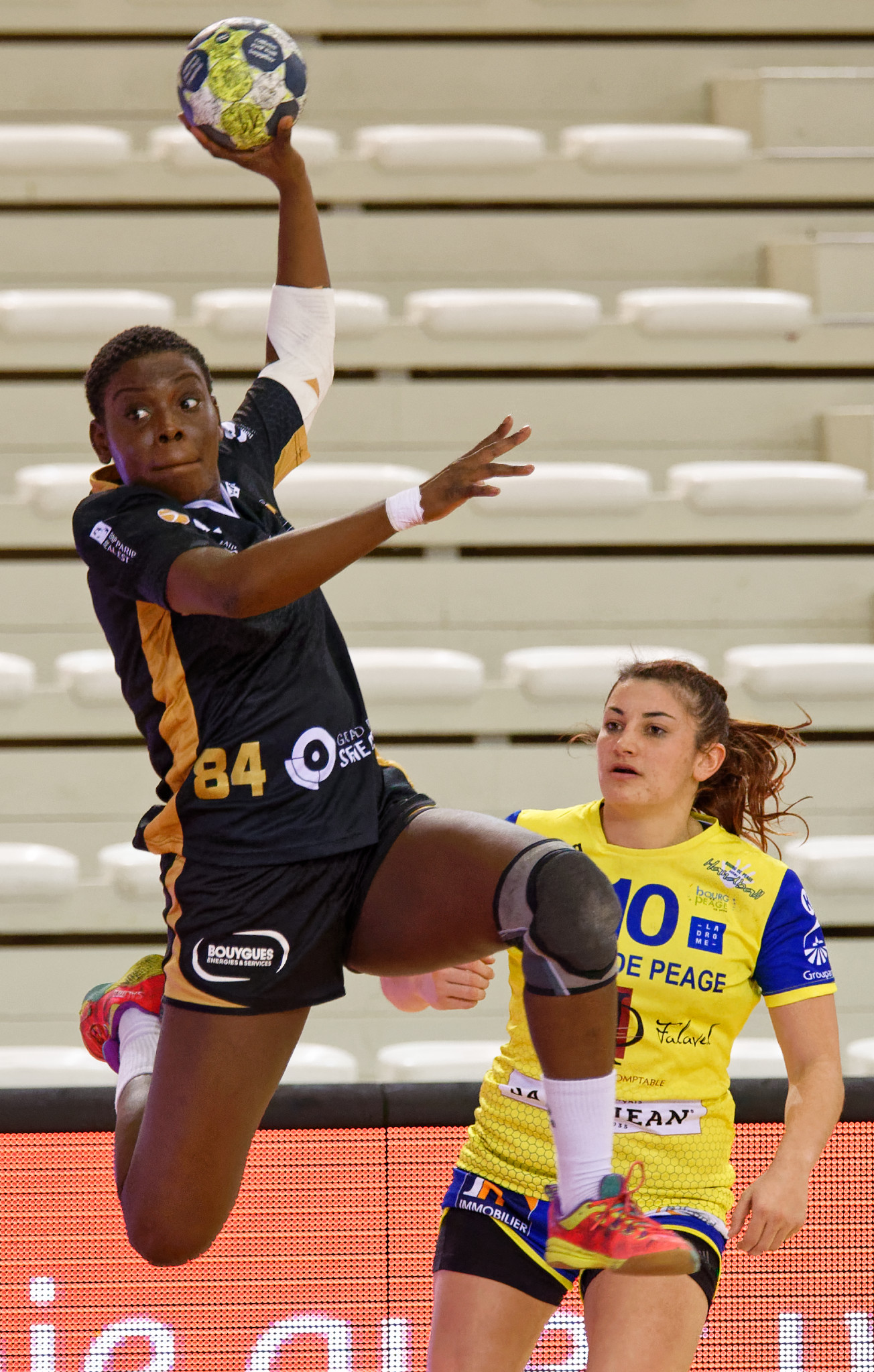

Personal information
- Full name: Melvine Deba
- Nationality: French
- Born: 8 January 1998 (age 28) Paris, France
- Height: 1.62 m (5 ft 4 in)

Sport
- Sport: Handball
- Position: Right wing
- Current club: Chambray
- Number: 84

Youth career
- Years: Team
- –2015: Issy Paris Hand

Senior clubs
- Years: Team
- 2015–2020: Issy Paris Hand
- 2020–2021: Metz Handball
- 2022–: Chambray
Medal record
EHF Junior European Championship
Gold medal – first place	2017 Slovenia

Melvine Deba (born 8 January 1998) is a French handballer who plays for Chambray Touraine Handball.

== Achievements ==
- French Cup:
  - Finalist: 2017
- EHF Junior European Championship:
  - Gold Medalist: 2017
