= Linda Pradel =

French handball player (born 1983)

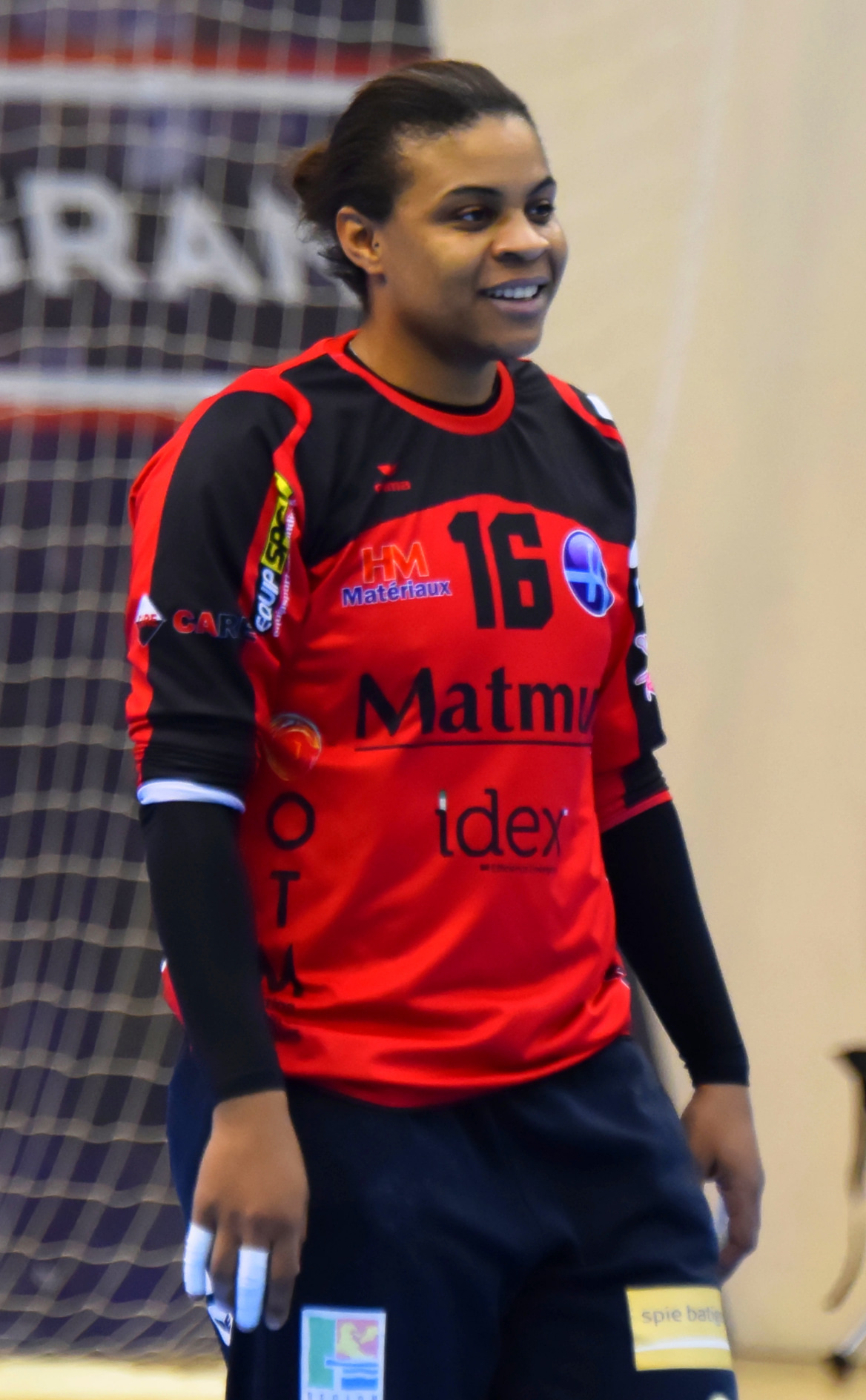

Personal information
- Nationality: French
- Born: 4 June 1983 (age 43) Trappes, France
- Height: 1.80 m (5 ft 11 in)

Sport
- Sport: Handball
- Position: Goalkeeper
- Current club: Chambray Touraine Handball
- Number: 16

Senior clubs
- Years: Team
- 2002-2004: Le Havre AC
- 2004–2008: HB Metz métropole
- 2008-2010: Le Havre AC
- 2010-2011: CB Mar Alicante
- 2011-2015: Le Havre AC
- 2015-2021: Chambray Touraine HB
National team
Years	Team	Apps	(Gls)
2005-	France	55	(0)
Medal record
Mediterranean Games
Gold medal – first place	2009 Pescara	Team
World Championship
Silver medal – second place	2009 China
- Updated on 4 December 2012

Linda Pradel (born 4 June 1983) is a French retired handball player for the French national team. She retired in 2021 while playing for Chambray Touraine Handball.

She participated at the 2009 World Women's Handball Championship in China, winning a silver medal with the French team.
