= Linn Hansson =

Swedish handball player (born 1997)

Personal information
- Nationality: Swedish
- Born: 18 September 1997 (age 29) Partille, Sweden
- Height: 169 cm (67 in)

Sport
- Sport: Handball
- Position: Left wing
- Current club: Paris 92
- Number: 29

Youth career
- Years: Team
- –2016: IK Sävehof

Senior clubs
- Years: Team
- 2016–2022: BK Heid
- 2022–2024: Önnereds HK
- 2024–2025: IK Sävehof
- 2025–: Paris 92
National team
Years	Team	Apps	(Gls)
2022–	Sweden	7	(11)
- Updated on 27 July 2025

Linn Hansson (born 18 September 1997) is a Swedish handball player for Paris 92 and the Swedish national team.

== Career ==
As a youth player Hansson played for IK Sävehof, where she won Junior gold medals. Due to the competition for playing time, she moved to BK Heid in 2016. Here she played for 2 years, before joining Önnereds HK. In 2024 she joined IK Sävehof. A year later she moved to France to join Paris 92.

Hansson never played for the Swedish youth national teams, due to competition from Hanna Örtorp, Emma Rask and Olivia Mellegård. In October 2022 she was selected for the Swedish national team for the first time. She was included in the brutto team for the 2022 European Women's Handball Championship, but did not make the final squad. During the championship she was however called up.
