= Leah Stutz =

Swiss handball player (born 1998)

Personal information
- Full name: Leah Stutz
- Born: 26 November 1998 (age 27) Arni, Switzerland
- Height: 1.62 m (5 ft 4 in)

Sport
- Sport: Handball
- Position: Centre back
- Current club: LK Zug
- Number: 11

Senior clubs
- Years: Team
- 2018–: LK Zug
National team
Years	Team	Apps	(Gls)
2022–	Switzerland	8	(2)

Leah Stutz (born 26 November 1998) is a Swiss handballer for LK Zug in the Spar Premium League and the Swiss national team.

She made her official debut on the Swiss national team on 29 September 2022, against Norway. She represented Switzerland for the first time at the 2022 European Women's Handball Championship in Slovenia, Montenegro and North Macedonia.
