= Rinka Duijndam =

Dutch handball player (born 1997)

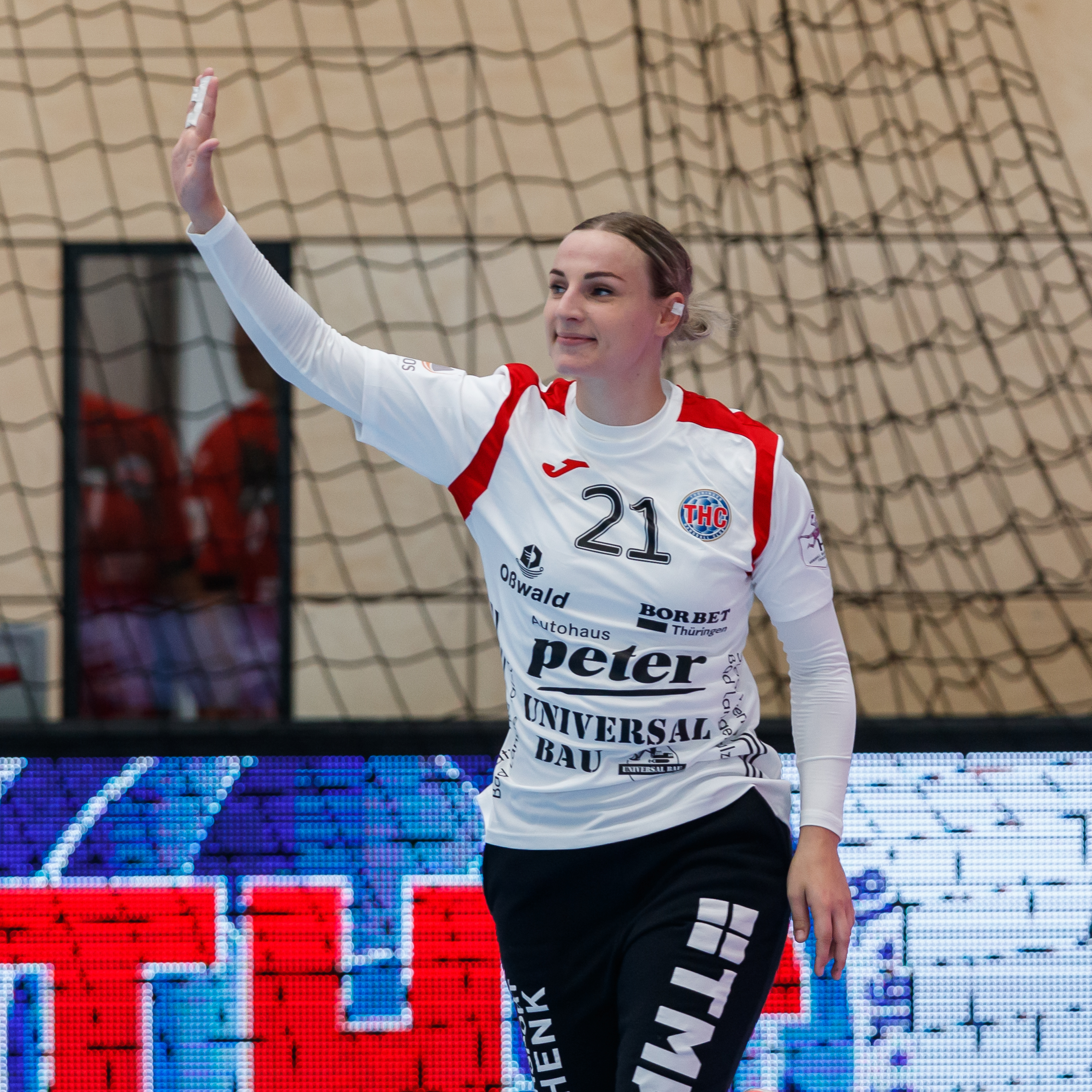
- Duijndam in 2021

Personal information
- Nationality: Dutch
- Born: 6 August 1997 (age 29) Wateringen, Netherlands
- Height: 1.78 m (5 ft 10 in)

Sport
- Sport: Handball
- Position: Goalkeeper
- Current club: Chambray Touraine Handball
- Number: 30

Senior clubs
- Years: Team
- –2012: SV VELO
- 2012–2016: Virto/Quintus
- 2016–2018: HSG Bad Wildungen
- 2018–2021: Borussia Dortmund
- 2021–2022: Thüringer HC
- 2022–2023: Sola HK
- 2023–2024: Győri ETO KC
- 2024–2025: CS Rapid București
- 2025–: Chambray Touraine Handball
National team
Years	Team	Apps	(Gls)
2018–	Netherlands	96	(2)
Medal record
World Championship
Gold medal – first place	2019 Japan
European Championship
Bronze medal – third place	2018 France
- Updated on 1 November 2024

Rinka Duijndam (born 6 August 1997) is a Dutch female professional handballer who plays as a goalkeeper for French club Chambray Touraine Handball and the Dutch national team.

She was a part the Netherlands team that won the 2019 World Women's Handball Championship; the first title in the country's history.

== Achievements ==
- EHF Champions League:
  - Winner: 2024
- REMA 1000-ligaen
  - Bronze: 2022/2023
- Norwegian Cup
  - Silver: 2022/2023
