= Zagłębie Lubin (women's handball) =

Polish women's handball team

- Full name: MKS Zagłębie Lubin S.A.
- Founded: 1982; 44 years ago
- Arena: Hala RCS
- Capacity: 3,714
- President: Witold Kulesza
- Head coach: Bożena Karkut
- League: Superliga
- 2024–25: 1st (champions)
- Club colours
Home	Away

MKS Zagłębie Lubin is a women's handball club from Lubin, Poland, that plays in the Superliga.

== Achievements ==
- Superliga:
  - Champions: 2011, 2021, 2022, 2023, 2024, 2025, 2026
  - Runners-up: 1995, 2000, 2002, 2006, 2009, 2010, 2012, 2013, 2014, 2017, 2018, 2019, 2020
  - Third place: 1996, 2001, 2007, 2008
- Puchar Polski:
  - Winners: 2009, 2011, 2013, 2017, 2019, 2020, 2021, 2023, 2024, 2025, 2026
  - Runners-up: 1998, 2006, 2010, 2014, 2015, 2022
- EHF Cup:
  - Semifinalists: 2001
- EHF Cup Winners' Cup:
  - Semifinalists: 2002

== Team ==
=== Current squad ===
Squad for the 2025–26 season

Goalkeepers

- 16 (Poland) Barbara Zima
- 27 (Poland) Lidia Piotrowska
- 99 (Poland) Monika Maliczkiewicz

Wingers
LW

- 6 (Poland) Kinga Grzyb
- 00 (Poland) Weronika Weber

RW

- 4 (Poland) Aneta Łabuda
- 21 (Brazil) Adriana Cardoso de Castro
- 00 (Poland) Natalia Janas

Line players

- 17 (Spain) Elisabet Cesáreo
- 20 (Poland) Joanna Drabik

Back players
LB

- 6 (Brazil) Mariane Fernándes
- 81 (Poland) Karolina Jureńczyk

CB

- 34 (Spain) Alicia Fernández
- 47 (Poland) Karolina Kochaniak-Sala
- 49 (Brazil) Patricia Matieli

RB

- 3 (Poland) Kinga Jakubowska
- 7 (Argentina) Malena Cavo

=== Transfers ===
Transfers for the 2026-27 season

Joining

- (Spain) Laura Hernández (LW) (from (Spain) BM Bera Bera)
- (France) Kalidiatou Niakaté (LB) (from (Italy) Handball Erice)

Leaving

=== Technical staff ===
- (Poland) Head Coach: Bożena Karkut
- (Poland) Assistant Coach: Renata Jakubowska
- (Poland) Psysiotherapist: Rafal Gasecki
