= Aneta Łabuda =

Polish handball player (born 1995)

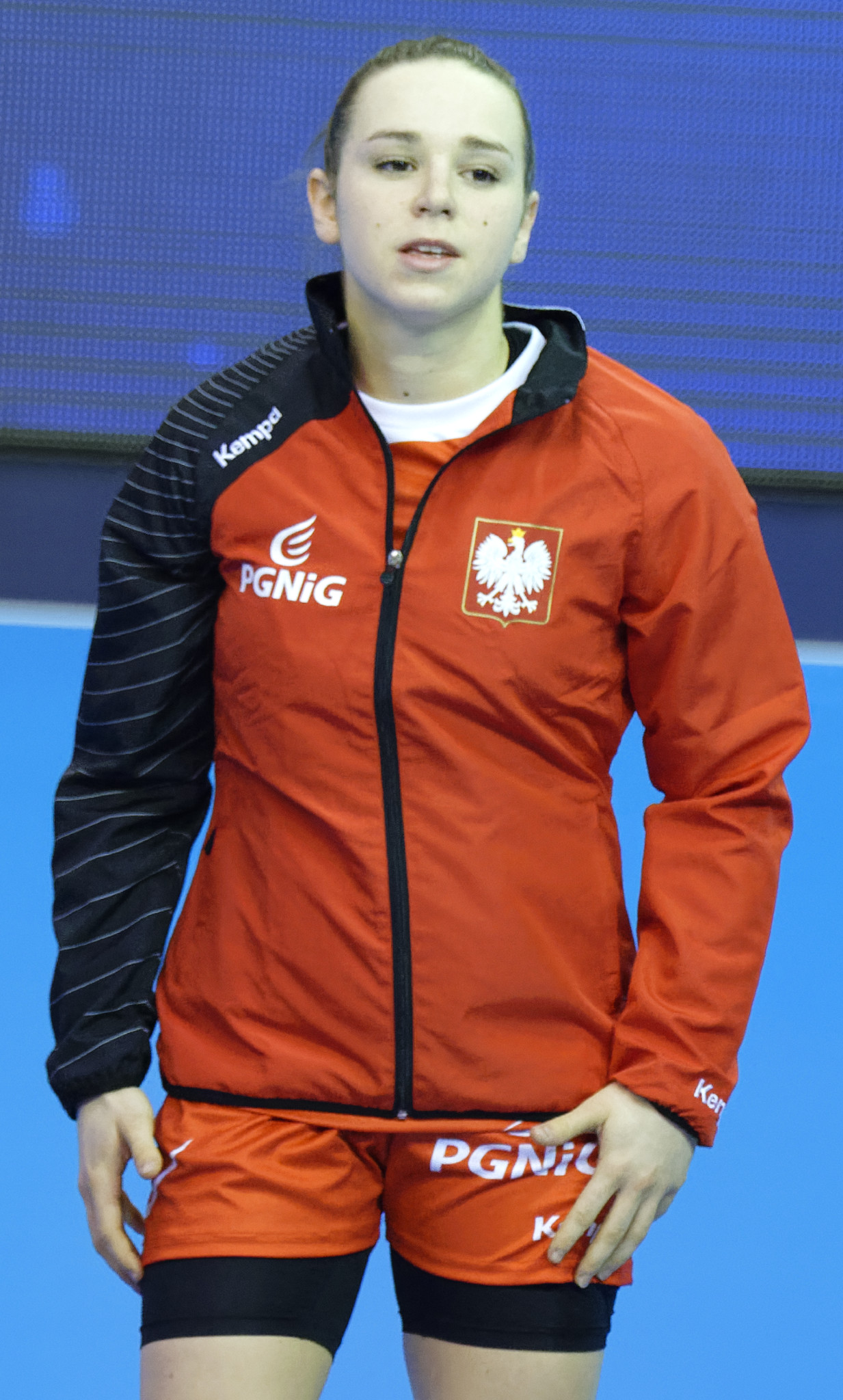

Personal information
- Nationality: Polish
- Born: 7 January 1995 (age 31) Żary, Poland
- Height: 1.60 m (5 ft 3 in)

Sport
- Sport: Handball
- Position: Right wing
- Current club: Zagłębie Lubin
- Number: 4
National team
Years	Team	Apps	(Gls)
–	Poland	46	(81)

Aneta Łabuda (born 7 January 1995) is a Polish handball player for Zagłębie Lubin and the Polish national team.

She competed at the 2015 World Women's Handball Championship in Denmark.
