= Stefanie Eugster =

Swiss handball player

Personal information
- Full name: Stefanie Eugster
- Nationality: Swiss
- Born: 16 August 2001 (age 25) Bühler, Switzerland
- Height: 1.81 m (5 ft 11 in)

Sport
- Sport: Handball
- Position: Line player
- Current club: LK Zug
- Number: 22

Senior clubs
- Years: Team
- 2018–: LK Zug
National team
Years	Team	Apps	(Gls)
2018–	Switzerland	30	(13)

Stefanie Eugster (born 16 August 2001) is a Swiss female handballer for LK Zug in the Spar Premium League and the Swiss national team.

She made her official debut on the Swiss national team on 22 November 2018, against Czech Republic. She represented Switzerland for the first time at the 2022 European Women's Handball Championship in Slovenia, Montenegro and North Macedonia.
