= Marija Jovanovska =

Macedonian female handballer

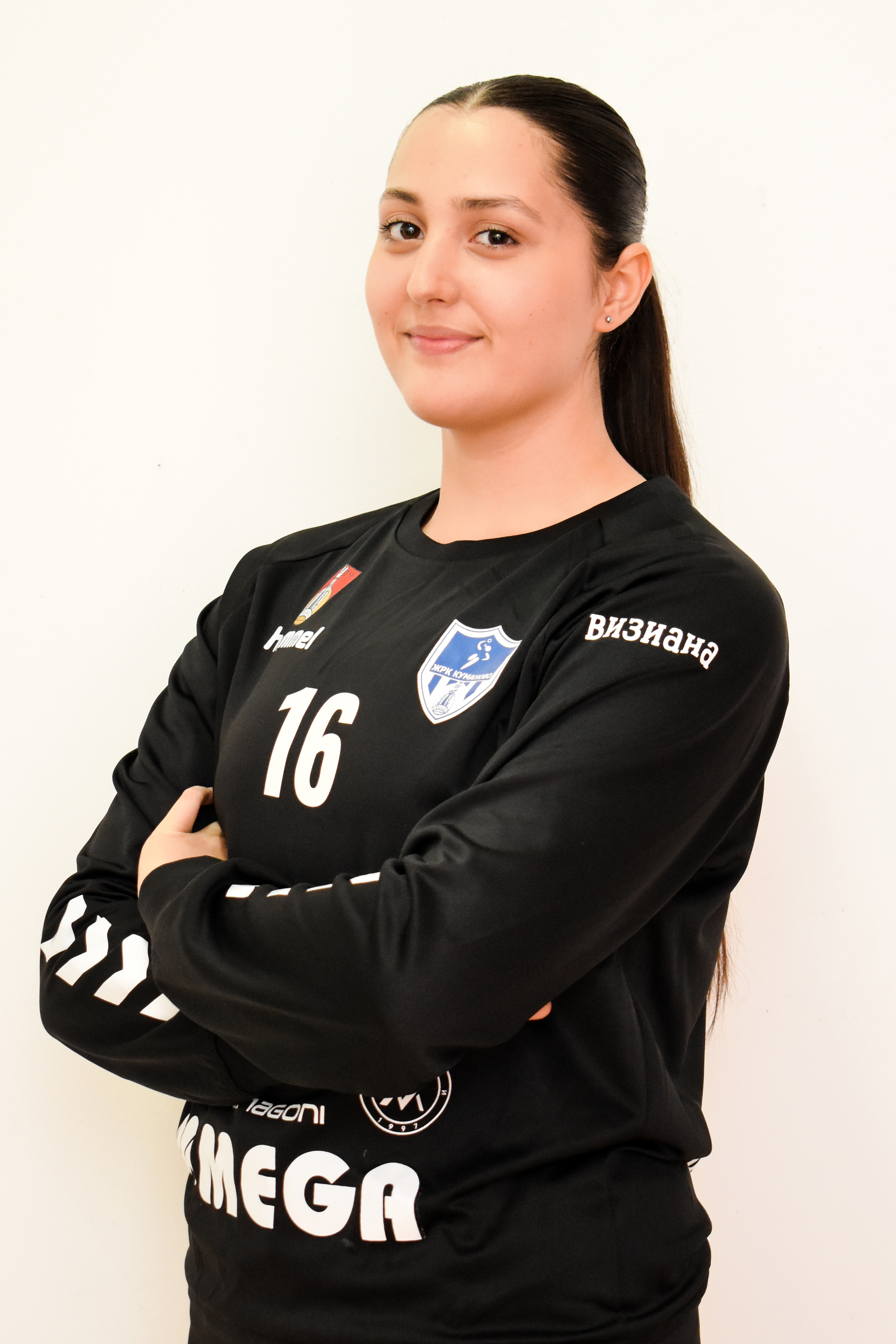

Personal information
- Nationality: Macedonian
- Born: 30 August 2004 (age 22) Kumanovo, Macedonia
- Height: 1.80 m (5 ft 11 in)

Sport
- Sport: Handball
- Position: Goalkeeper
- Current club: ŽRK Kumanovo
- Number: 16

Senior clubs
- Years: Team
- 2022-: ŽRK Kumanovo
National team
Years	Team	Apps	(Gls)
2022–	North Macedonia	0	(0)

Marija Jovanovska (born 30 August 2004) is a Macedonian female handballer for ŽRK Kumanovo and the North Macedonia national team.

She represented the North Macedonia at the 2022 European Women's Handball Championship.
