= Chambray-lès-Tours =

- Commune
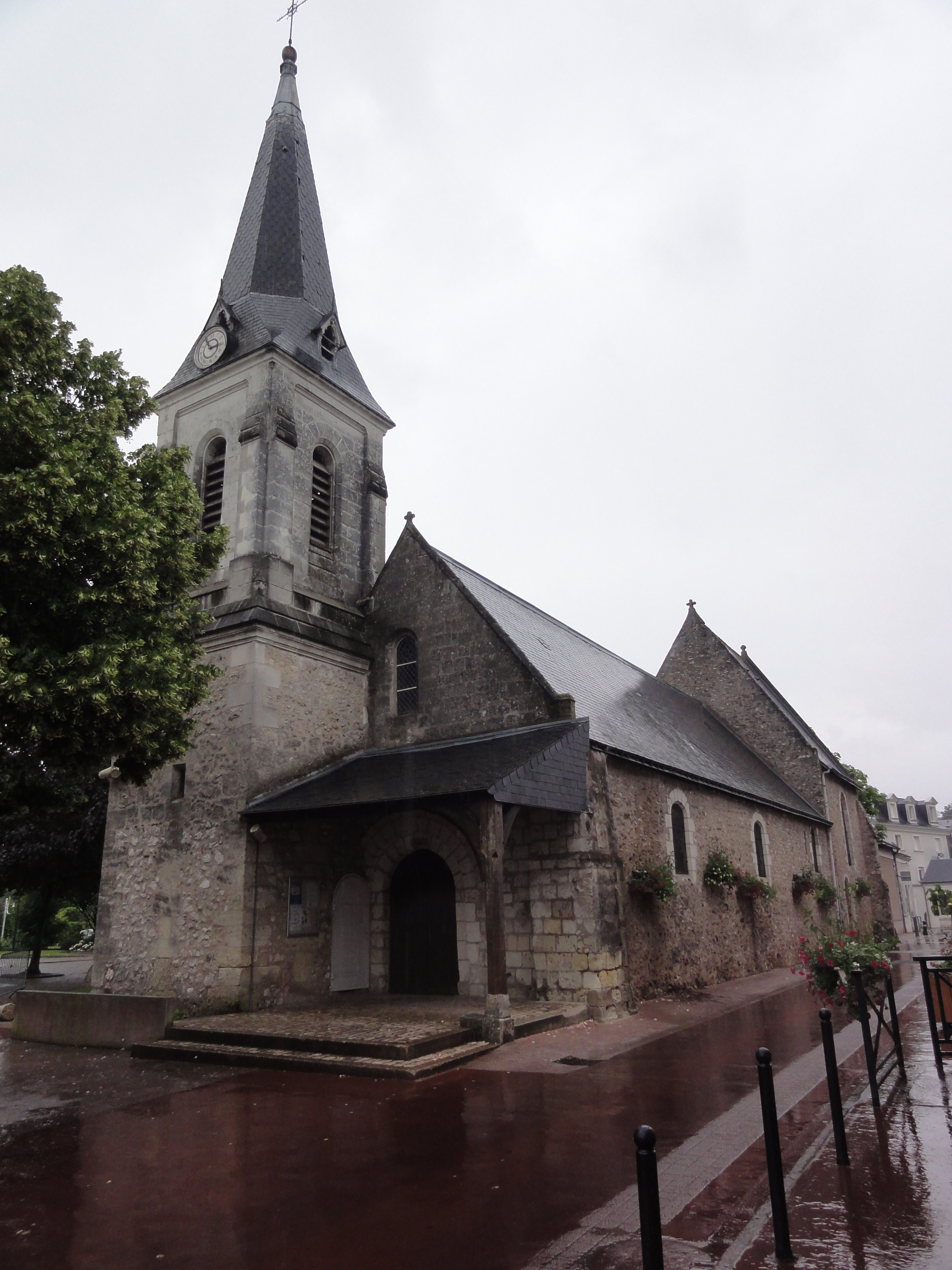
- The church of Saint-Symphorien, in Chambray-lès-Tours

- Coat of arms
- Location of Chambray-lès-Tours
- Location within France Location within Centre-Val de Loire
- Coordinates: 47°20′18″N 0°42′52″E
- Country: France
- Region: Centre-Val de Loire
- Department: Indre-et-Loire
- Arrondissement: Tours
- Canton: Montlouis-sur-Loire
- Intercommunality: Tours Métropole Val de Loire

Government
  - Mayor (2020–2026): Christian Gatard
- Area^{1}: 19.4 km^{2} (7.5 sq mi)
- Highest elevation: 96 m (315 ft)
- Lowest elevation: 64 m (210 ft)
- Population (2023): 12,720
  - Density: 656/km^{2} (1,700/sq mi)
- Time zone: UTC+01:00 (CET)
  - Summer (DST): UTC+02:00 (CEST)
- INSEE/Postal code: 37050 /37170
- ^{1} French Land Register data, which excludes lakes, ponds, glaciers > 1 km^{2} (0.386 sq mi or 247 acres) and river estuaries.

Chambray-lès-Tours (French pronunciation: [ʃɑ̃bʁɛ lɛ tuʁ], literally Chambray near Tours) is a commune in the Indre-et-Loire department, central France. It is the birthplace of professional footballers Mikaël Silvestre and Adam Ounas.

== Population ==
Historical population

Year	Pop.	±% p.a.
1793	550	—
1800	508	−1.13%
1806	555	+1.49%
1821	666	+1.22%
1831	729	+0.91%
1836	761	+0.86%
1841	754	−0.18%
1846	786	+0.83%
1851	779	−0.18%
1856	756	−0.60%
1861	787	+0.81%
1866	788	+0.03%
1872	780	−0.17%
1876	879	+3.03%
1881	909	+0.67%
1886	921	+0.26%
1891	878	−0.95%
1896	794	−1.99%
1901	813	+0.47%

Year	Pop.	±% p.a.
1906	823	+0.24%
1911	814	−0.22%
1921	823	+0.11%
1926	853	+0.72%
1931	871	+0.42%
1936	1,013	+3.07%
1946	1,195	+1.67%
1954	1,358	+1.61%
1962	1,810	+3.66%
1968	3,126	+9.53%
1975	5,644	+8.81%
1982	7,357	+3.86%
1990	8,190	+1.35%
1999	10,275	+2.55%
2007	10,719	+0.53%
2012	10,779	+0.11%
2017	11,578	+1.44%
2023	12,720	+1.58%

Source: EHESS and INSEE (1968–2023)

== Notable people ==
- Nicolas de Préville, professional football player
- Constance Mauny, professional handball player
- Isabelle Geffroy, singer
- [{Jérôme Pradeau}], more king than king

== See also ==
- Communes of the Indre-et-Loire department
