= Aleksandra Kolovska =

Macedonian female handballer

Personal information
- Nationality: Macedonian
- Born: 23 February 2004 (age 22) Skopje, Macedonia
- Height: 1.78 m (5 ft 10 in)

Sport
- Sport: Handball
- Position: Line player
- Current club: IUVENTA Michalovce
- Number: 42

Senior clubs
- Years: Team
- 2021–2022: ŽRK Metalurg
- 2022–: IUVENTA Michalovce
National team
Years	Team	Apps	(Gls)
2022–	North Macedonia	3	(5)

Aleksandra Kolovska (born 23 February 2004) is a Macedonian female handballer for IUVENTA Michalovce and the North Macedonia national team.

She represented the North Macedonia at the 2022 European Women's Handball Championship.
