= Polish Women's Superliga (women's handball) =

- Current season, competition or edition: 2024–25 Superliga (women's handball)
- Sport: Handball
- Founded: 1939; 87 years ago
- President: Piotr Należyty
- Administrator: Polish Handball Association
- No. of teams: 10
- Country: Poland
- Confederation: EHF
- Most recent champion: Zagłębie Lubin (6th title) (2024–25)
- Most titles: MKS Lublin (22 titles)
- Broadcaster: TVP Sport
- Sponsor: Orlen
- International cups: Champions League; EHF Cup; Challenge Cup
- Website: superligakobiet.pl

The Polish Women's Superliga, officially known as the Orlen Superliga due to its sponsorship by Orlen, is the top women's handball league in Poland. The current champions are Zagłębie Lubin.

== 2024–25 teams ==
- Energa Start Elbląg
- Energa Szczypiorno Kalisz
- KGHM Zagłębie Lubin
- KPR Gminy Kobierzyce
- MKS FunFloor Lublin
- MKS Urbis Gniezno
- Młyny Stoisław Koszalin
- Piotrcovia Piotrków Trybunalski
- Ruch Chorzów
- Sośnica Gliwice

== EHF league ranking ==
EHF League Ranking as of the 2023–24 season.

Current ranking	Movement	Last season's ranking	League	Coefficient
11	▲ +2	(13)	(Czech Republic) Extraliga	49.00
12	▼ -4	(8)	(Croatia) 1. HRL	48.00
13	▼ -1	(12)	(Poland) Orlen Superliga	46.00
14	—	(14)	(Turkey) Süper Ligi	22.00
15	—	(15)	(Spain) División de Honor	18.00

== List of champions ==
- 1939 - Znicz Łódź
- 1946 - Zryw Łódź
- 1947 - Zryw Łódź
- 1948 - SKS Warsaw
- 1949 - Unia Łódź
- 1950 - Spójnia Warsaw
- 1951 - Unia Łódź
- 1952 - Unia Łódź
- 1953 - not held
- 1954 - not held
- 1955 - Stal Chorzów
- 1956 - Stal Chorzów
- 1957 - Cracovia
- 1958 - Cracovia
- 1959 - AZS Katowice
- 1960 - Cracovia
- 1961 - Cracovia
- 1962 - Ruch Chorzów
- 1963 - Ruch Chorzów
- 1964 - Ruch Chorzów
- 1965 - Sośnica Gliwice
- 1966 - Sośnica Gliwice
- 1967 - Cracovia
- 1968 - AZS Wrocław
- 1969 - AZS Wrocław
- 1970 - Otmęt Krapkowice
- 1971 - Otmęt Krapkowice
- 1972 - Sośnica Gliwice
- 1973 - Ruch Chorzów
- 1974 - Ruch Chorzów
- 1975 - Ruch Chorzów
- 1976 - AZS Wrocław
- 1977 - Ruch Chorzów
- 1978 - Ruch Chorzów
- 1979 - AZS Wrocław
- 1980 - Ruch Chorzów
- 1981 - AKS Chorzów
- 1982 - AKS Chorzów
- 1983 - Pogoń Szczecin
- 1984 - AZS Wrocław
- 1985 - Cracovia
- 1986 - Pogoń Szczecin
- 1987 - Cracovia
- 1988 - AKS Chorzów
- 1989 - AZS Wrocław
- 1990 - AZS Wrocław
- 1991 - Pogoń Szczecin
- 1992 - Start Elbląg
- 1993 - Piotrcovia Piotrków Trybunalski
- 1994 - Start Elbląg
- 1995 - Montex Lublin
- 1996 - Montex Lublin
- 1997 - Montex Lublin
- 1998 - Montex Lublin
- 1999 - Montex Lublin
- 2000 - Montex Lublin
- 2001 - Montex Lublin
- 2002 - Montex Lublin
- 2003 - Pol-Skone Lublin
- 2004 - AZS AWFiS Gdańsk
- 2005 - SPR ICom Lublin
- 2006 - SPR ICom Lublin
- 2007 - SPR ICom Lublin
- 2008 - SPR ICom Lublin
- 2009 - SPR Asecco Lublin
- 2010 - SPR Lublin
- 2011 – KGHM Metraco Zagłębie Lubin
- 2012 - Vistal Łączpol Gdynia
- 2013 - SPR Lublin
- 2014 - MKS Selgros Lublin
- 2015 - MKS Selgros Lublin
- 2016 - MKS Selgros Lublin
- 2017 - GTPR Gdynia
- 2018 - MKS Lublin
- 2019 - MKS Lublin
- 2020 - MKS Lublin
- 2021 - Metraco Zagłębie Lubin
- 2022 - Zagłębie Lubin
- 2023 - Zagłębie Lubin
- 2024 - Zagłębie Lubin
- 2025 - Zagłębie Lubin
- 2025 - KGHM MKS Zagłębie Lubin

== See also ==
- Superliga (men's handball)
- Handball in Poland
- Sports in Poland
