= Claudia Rompen =

Dutch handball player (born 1997)

Personal information
- Full name: Claudia Rompen
- Nationality: Dutch
- Born: 27 January 1997 (age 29) Mechelen, Netherlands
- Height: 1.76 m (5 ft 9 in)

Sport
- Sport: Handball
- Position: Goalkeeper
- Current club: HH Elite
- Number: 13

Senior clubs
- Years: Team
- 2014-2017: HandbaL Venlo
- 2017-2019: SønderjyskE Håndbold
- 2019-2023: HH Elite
- 2023-: Viborg HK
National team
Years	Team	Apps	(Gls)
2018-	Netherlands	5	(1)

Claudia Rompen (born 27 January 1997) is a Dutch handball player for the Danish club Viborg HK and the Dutch national team.

She was selected as part of the Dutch 35-player squad for the 2020 European Women's Handball Championship.
