= Paris 92 =

French handball club

- Full name: Paris 92 (from 2018)
- Nickname: Les Lionnes
- Short name: Paris
- Founded: 1999
- Arena: Palais des Sports Robert-Charpentier; Stade Pierre de Coubertin, Paris
- Capacity: 1,500; 4,835
- President: Jean-Marie Sifre
- Head coach: Fabien Courtial
- League: LFH Division 1
- 2025–26: 9th
- Club colours
| Home | Away |

Paris 92 is a French professional handball club from Issy-les-Moulineaux, Paris. This team currently competes in the French Women's Handball First League from 2010. The club was previously named Issy-les-Moulineaux Handball (1999-2009) and Issy Paris Hand (2009-2018).

== Results ==
- French Women's First League Championship:
  - Runner-up (4): 2012, 2014, 2015, 2017
- French Women's Cup:
  - Runner-up (1) : 2014
  - 1/2 Finalist (2) : 2009, 2010
  - 1/4 Finalist (2) : 2013, 2016
  - 1/8 Finalist (2) :2011, 2015
- French Women's League Cup:
  - Winners (1): 2013
  - Runner-up (5) : 2008, 2009,
  - 1/2 Finalist (3) : 2014, 2015, 2016
  - 1/4 Finalist (1) : 2012
- European Women's EHF Cup:
  - 1/4 Finalist (1) : 2009
- European Women's EHF Cup Winners' Cup:
  - Runner-up (1): 2013
  - 1/2 Finalist (1): 2015
- European Women's EHF Challenge Cup:
  - Runner-up (1): 2014

== Team ==
=== Current squad ===
Squad for the 2026-27 season

Goalkeepers

- 13 (France) Mélina Cantin
- 97 (France) Julie Foggea

Wingers
LW

- 10 (France) Aminata Cissokho
- 29 (Sweden) Linn Hansson
- 74 (France) Chloé Houzé

RW

- 30 (France) Mélina Peillon
- 30 (France) Nahia Malharin

Line players

- 3 (Netherlands) Sharon Nooitmeer
- 18 (France) Maëlys Kouaya
- 77 (France) Emmanuelle Thobor

Back players
LB

- 22 (Denmark) Rikke Hoffbeck
- 15 (North Macedonia) Marija Jankulovska (injured)

CB

- 28 (France) Léa Ballureau
- 92 (France) Julilove Andon

RB

- 18 (France) Jannela Blonbou
- 26 (France) Barbara Moretto

=== Transfers ===
Transfers for the 2027–28 season

Joining

Leaving

=== Notable players ===
- (France) Armelle Attingré (2009-2016)
- (France) Paule Baudouin (2006-2008)
- (France) Lesly Briemant (2010-2015)
- (France) Audrey Bruneau (2008-2012)
- (France) Doungou Camara (2012-2017)
- (France) Cléopâtre Darleux (2007-2009)
- (France) Siraba Dembélé (2008-2009)
- (France) Audrey Deroin (2004-2009)
- (France) Amélie Goudjo (2007-2008, 2010-2014)
- (France) Sophie Herbrecht (2006-2009)
- (France) Stella Joseph-Mathieu (2000-2003)
- (France) Coralie Lassource (2008-2017)
- (France) Astride N'Gouan (2010-2014)
- (France) Allison Pineau (2006-2009, 2019-2020)
- (France) Marie-Audrey Sababady (2005-2011)
- (France) Mariama Signaté (2011-2014)
- (France) Angélique Spincer (2006-2015)
- (France) Melvine Deba (2015-2020)
- (France) Océane Sercien-Ugolin (2018-2020)
- (France) Chloé Bulleux (2017-2019)
- (France) Kalidiatou Niakaté (2011-2017)
- (France) Tamara Horacek (2017-2020)
- (France) Catherine Gabriel (2020-2022)
- (France) Marie-Hélène Sajka (2021-2022)
- (Norway) Hanna Bredal Oftedal (2014-2019)
- (Norway) Stine Bredal Oftedal (2013-2017)
- (Norway) Silje Solberg (2016-2018)
- (Norway) Pernille Wibe (2013-2017)
- (Norway) Karoline Lund (2021)
- (Norway) Charlotte Mordal (2010-2014)
- (Sweden) Ulrika Toft Hansen (2019-2020)
- (Sweden) Frida Tegstedt (2016-2017)
- (Montenegro) Jasna Tošković (2012-2013)
- (Montenegro) Marija Jovanović (2014-2016)
- (Czech Republic) Lucie Satrapová (2018-2020)
- (Czech Republic) Veronika Malá (2017-2021)
- (Netherlands) Lois Abbingh (2016-2018)
- (Denmark) Nadia Offendal (2020-2022)
- (Brazil) Mayssa Pessoa (2011-2012)
- (Hungary) Krisztina Pigniczki (2008-2011)
- (Poland) Karolina Zalewska (2008-2017)
- (Romania) Crina Pintea (2017-2019)
- (Austria) Sonja Frey (2017-2019)
- (South Korea) Ryu Eun-hee (2019-2020)
- (Angola) Ruth João (2022)

== Arena ==
- Name: Palais des Sports Robert-Charpentier
- City: Issy-les-Moulineaux, Paris
- Capacity: 1,500 seats
- Address: 6 Boulevard des Frères Voisin, 92130 Issy-les-Moulineaux

- Name: Stade Pierre-de-Coubertin
- City: Boulogne-Billancourt, Paris
- Capacity: 4,020 seats
- Address: 82 Avenue Georges Lafont, 75016 Paris
