= 2016 Women's Youth World Handball Championship =

Tournament details
- Host country: Slovakia
- Venues: 2 (in 1 host city)
- Dates: 19–31 July
- Teams: 24 (from 4 confederations)

Final positions
- Champions: Russia (2nd title)
- Runners-up: Denmark
- Third place: South Korea
- Fourth place: Norway

Tournament statistics
- Matches played: 92
- Goals scored: 5,094 (55.37 per match)
- Top scorers: (Hungary) Bernadett Hornyák (78 goals)

Awards
- Best player: (Russia) Karina Sabirova

The 2016 Women's Youth World Handball Championship was the sixth edition of the tournament and took place in Slovakia from 19 to 31 July 2016.

Russia won their second title after defeating Denmark 30–22 in the final.

== Teams ==
Africa

- Angola
- DR Congo
- Egypt

Asia

- China
- Japan
- Kazakhstan
- South Korea
- Uzbekistan

Europe

- Croatia
- Denmark
- France
- Germany
- Hungary
- Norway
- Romania
- Russia
- Slovenia
- Slovakia (Host)
- Spain
- Sweden

Pan-America

- Argentina
- Brazil
- Chile
- Paraguay

== Venues ==
Matches will be played in Bratislava.

- Ondrej Nepela Arena (10,055)
- Aegon Arena (4,000)

== Referees ==
16 referee pairs were selected.

Referees
Argentina	María Paolantoni; María Zanikian
Belarus	Siarhei Kulik; Dzmitry Nabokau
China	Li Zhaomend; Liu Jianpeng
Croatia	Davor Lončar; Zoran Lončar
Germany	Maike Merz; Tanja Schilha
Greece	Andreas Bethmann; Michail Tzaferopoulos
Iraq	Khalid Hussein; Fadhil Imran
Japan	Tomoko Ota; Mariko Shimajiri

Referees
Montenegro	Miloš Ražnatović; Ivan Pavićević
Poland	Bartosz Leszczyński; Marcin Piechota
Romania	Cristina Năstase; Simona Stancu
Russia	Viktoria Alpaizde; Tatiana Berezkina
Senegal	Cheikh Diop; Abdoulaye Faye
Serbia	Vanja Antić; Jelena Jakovljević
Slovakia	Michal Baďura; Jaroslav Ondogrecula
Tunisia	Soumaya Abid; Ikram Chaouch

== Preliminary round ==
=== Group A ===
Pos	Team	Pld	W	D	L	GF	GA	GD	Pts	Qualification
1	Russia	5	5	0	0	172	113	+59	10	Quarterfinals
2	Croatia	5	3	0	2	135	123	+12	6 (Note: Germany 21–23 Croatia)	Quarterfinals
3	Germany	5	3	0	2	138	116	+22	6	Quarterfinals
4	Angola	5	2	1	2	138	126	+12	5	Quarterfinals
5	Japan	5	1	1	3	139	138	+1	3	
6	Chile	5	0	0	5	91	197	−106	0	

Source: IHF
Rules for classification: 1) Points; 2) Head-to-head points; 3) Head-to-head goal difference; 4) Head-to-head goals scored; 5) Goal difference; 6) Goals scored; 7) Draw.
Notes:

19 July 2016; 10:00	Russia	29–21	Germany	Ondrej Nepela Arena, Bratislava; Referees: Baďura, Ondogrecula (SVK)
19 July 2016; 10:00	Sabirova 8	(14–9)	Peter 7	Ondrej Nepela Arena, Bratislava; Referees: Baďura, Ondogrecula (SVK)
19 July 2016; 10:00	3× (yellow card) 5× (suspension)	Report	2× (yellow card) 6× (suspension)	Ondrej Nepela Arena, Bratislava; Referees: Baďura, Ondogrecula (SVK)

19 July 2016; 12:00	Croatia	41–14	Chile	Ondrej Nepela Arena, Bratislava; Attendance: 100; Referees: Năstase, Stancu (ROU)
19 July 2016; 12:00	Japundža 7	(18–8)	Alarcon 4	Ondrej Nepela Arena, Bratislava; Attendance: 100; Referees: Năstase, Stancu (ROU)
19 July 2016; 12:00	3× (yellow card) 6× (suspension)	Report	2× (yellow card) 4× (suspension)	Ondrej Nepela Arena, Bratislava; Attendance: 100; Referees: Năstase, Stancu (ROU)

19 July 2016; 14:00	Japan	25–25	Angola	Ondrej Nepela Arena, Bratislava; Attendance: 100; Referees: Leszczyński, Piechota (POL)
19 July 2016; 14:00	Nakayama 8	(9–13)	Gilda 9	Ondrej Nepela Arena, Bratislava; Attendance: 100; Referees: Leszczyński, Piechota (POL)
19 July 2016; 14:00	3× (yellow card) 3× (suspension)	Report	3× (yellow card) 5× (suspension)	Ondrej Nepela Arena, Bratislava; Attendance: 100; Referees: Leszczyński, Piechota (POL)

21 July 2016; 16:00	Germany	21–23	Croatia	Ondrej Nepela Arena, Bratislava; Attendance: 150; Referees: Alpaidze, Berezkina (RUS)
21 July 2016; 16:00	Peter 8	(11–8)	Japundža 7	Ondrej Nepela Arena, Bratislava; Attendance: 150; Referees: Alpaidze, Berezkina (RUS)
21 July 2016; 16:00	3× (yellow card) 2× (suspension)	Report	2× (yellow card) 6× (suspension)	Ondrej Nepela Arena, Bratislava; Attendance: 150; Referees: Alpaidze, Berezkina (RUS)

21 July 2016; 18:00	Angola	25–32	Russia	Ondrej Nepela Arena, Bratislava; Attendance: 20; Referees: Emam, Hedeia (EGY)
21 July 2016; 18:00	Irinela 10	(14–15)	Sabirova 8	Ondrej Nepela Arena, Bratislava; Attendance: 20; Referees: Emam, Hedeia (EGY)
21 July 2016; 18:00	4× (yellow card) 5× (suspension)	Report	1× (yellow card) 4× (suspension)	Ondrej Nepela Arena, Bratislava; Attendance: 20; Referees: Emam, Hedeia (EGY)

21 July 2016; 20:00	Chile	19–39	Japan	Ondrej Nepela Arena, Bratislava; Attendance: 150; Referees: Paolantoni, Zanikian (ARG)
21 July 2016; 20:00	Gómez, Moreno 5	(11–18)	Nakayama 11	Ondrej Nepela Arena, Bratislava; Attendance: 150; Referees: Paolantoni, Zanikian (ARG)
21 July 2016; 20:00	3× (yellow card) 4× (suspension)	Report	3× (yellow card) 6× (suspension)	Ondrej Nepela Arena, Bratislava; Attendance: 150; Referees: Paolantoni, Zanikian (ARG)

22 July 2016; 16:00	Russia	43–23	Chile	Ondrej Nepela Arena, Bratislava; Attendance: 50; Referees: Abid, Chaouch (TUN)
22 July 2016; 16:00	Skorobogatchenko 9	(21–7)	Gómez 6	Ondrej Nepela Arena, Bratislava; Attendance: 50; Referees: Abid, Chaouch (TUN)
22 July 2016; 16:00	3× (yellow card) 6× (suspension)	Report	4× (yellow card) 3× (suspension)	Ondrej Nepela Arena, Bratislava; Attendance: 50; Referees: Abid, Chaouch (TUN)

22 July 2016; 18:00	Croatia	30–26	Japan	Ondrej Nepela Arena, Bratislava; Attendance: 100; Referees: Antić, Jakovljević (SRB)
22 July 2016; 18:00	Karlovčan 8	(15–17)	Yoshioka 8	Ondrej Nepela Arena, Bratislava; Attendance: 100; Referees: Antić, Jakovljević (SRB)
22 July 2016; 18:00	2× (yellow card) 3× (suspension)	Report	3× (yellow card) 4× (suspension)	Ondrej Nepela Arena, Bratislava; Attendance: 100; Referees: Antić, Jakovljević (SRB)

22 July 2016; 20:00	Germany	27–25	Angola	Ondrej Nepela Arena, Bratislava; Attendance: 150; Referees: Paolantoni, Zanikian (ARG)
22 July 2016; 20:00	Peter 8	(16–13)	Gilda 8	Ondrej Nepela Arena, Bratislava; Attendance: 150; Referees: Paolantoni, Zanikian (ARG)
22 July 2016; 20:00	3× (yellow card) 1× (suspension)	Report	2× (yellow card) 4× (suspension)	Ondrej Nepela Arena, Bratislava; Attendance: 150; Referees: Paolantoni, Zanikian (ARG)

24 July 2016; 16:00	Croatia	22–30	Angola	Ondrej Nepela Arena, Bratislava; Attendance: 100; Referees: Schilha, Schilha (GER)
24 July 2016; 16:00	Japundža 8	(12–12)	Gilda 10	Ondrej Nepela Arena, Bratislava; Attendance: 100; Referees: Schilha, Schilha (GER)
24 July 2016; 16:00	1× (yellow card) 3× (suspension)	Report	2× (yellow card) 8× (suspension) 1× (red card)	Ondrej Nepela Arena, Bratislava; Attendance: 100; Referees: Schilha, Schilha (GER)

24 July 2016; 18:00	Japan	25–36	Russia	Ondrej Nepela Arena, Bratislava; Attendance: 100; Referees: Paolantoni, Zanikian (ARG)
24 July 2016; 18:00	Namiki 7	(14–20)	Skorobogatchenko 9	Ondrej Nepela Arena, Bratislava; Attendance: 100; Referees: Paolantoni, Zanikian (ARG)
24 July 2016; 18:00	3× (yellow card) 2× (suspension)	Report	2× (suspension)	Ondrej Nepela Arena, Bratislava; Attendance: 100; Referees: Paolantoni, Zanikian (ARG)

24 July 2016; 20:00	Chile	15–41	Germany	Ondrej Nepela Arena, Bratislava; Attendance: 100; Referees: Hussein, Imran (IRQ)
24 July 2016; 20:00	Castro 5	(8–18)	Franz, Maidhof 8	Ondrej Nepela Arena, Bratislava; Attendance: 100; Referees: Hussein, Imran (IRQ)
24 July 2016; 20:00	2× (yellow card) 7× (suspension)	Report	1× (yellow card) 6× (suspension)	Ondrej Nepela Arena, Bratislava; Attendance: 100; Referees: Hussein, Imran (IRQ)

25 July 2016; 16:00	Angola	33–20	Chile	Ondrej Nepela Arena, Bratislava; Attendance: 100; Referees: Li, Liu (CHN)
25 July 2016; 16:00	Gilda 12	(18–6)	Gómez 7	Ondrej Nepela Arena, Bratislava; Attendance: 100; Referees: Li, Liu (CHN)
25 July 2016; 16:00	3× (yellow card) 6× (suspension)	Report	2× (yellow card) 2× (suspension)	Ondrej Nepela Arena, Bratislava; Attendance: 100; Referees: Li, Liu (CHN)

25 July 2016; 18:00	Japan	24–28	Germany	Ondrej Nepela Arena, Bratislava; Attendance: 100; Referees: Lončar, Lončar (CRO)
25 July 2016; 18:00	Nakayama 7	(10–15)	Hurst 9	Ondrej Nepela Arena, Bratislava; Attendance: 100; Referees: Lončar, Lončar (CRO)
25 July 2016; 18:00	3× (yellow card) 3× (suspension)	Report	3× (yellow card)	Ondrej Nepela Arena, Bratislava; Attendance: 100; Referees: Lončar, Lončar (CRO)

25 July 2016; 20:00	Russia	32–19	Croatia	Ondrej Nepela Arena, Bratislava; Attendance: 250; Referees: Bethmann, Tzaferopoulos (GRE)
25 July 2016; 20:00	Sabirova 8	(18–11)	Japundža, Nikolić 4	Ondrej Nepela Arena, Bratislava; Attendance: 250; Referees: Bethmann, Tzaferopoulos (GRE)
25 July 2016; 20:00	3× (yellow card) 5× (suspension)	Report	3× (yellow card) 3× (suspension)	Ondrej Nepela Arena, Bratislava; Attendance: 250; Referees: Bethmann, Tzaferopoulos (GRE)

=== Group B ===
Pos	Team	Pld	W	D	L	GF	GA	GD	Pts	Qualification
1	Hungary	5	5	0	0	173	96	+77	10	Quarterfinals
2	Sweden	5	4	0	1	143	124	+19	8	Quarterfinals
3	Brazil	5	3	0	2	139	111	+28	6	Quarterfinals
4	Spain	5	2	0	3	140	130	+10	4	Quarterfinals
5	China	5	1	0	4	114	167	−53	2	
6	DR Congo	5	0	0	5	96	177	−81	0	

Source: IHF
Rules for classification: 1) Points; 2) Head-to-head points; 3) Head-to-head goal difference; 4) Head-to-head goals scored; 5) Goal difference; 6) Goals scored; 7) Draw.

19 July 2016; 09:30	Hungary	44–17	China	Aegon Arena, Bratislava; Attendance: 100; Referees: Lončar, Lončar (CRO)
19 July 2016; 09:30	Hornyák 14	(24–10)	Huang 6	Aegon Arena, Bratislava; Attendance: 100; Referees: Lončar, Lončar (CRO)
19 July 2016; 09:30	3× (yellow card) 4× (suspension)	Report	3× (yellow card) 5× (suspension) 1× (red card)	Aegon Arena, Bratislava; Attendance: 100; Referees: Lončar, Lončar (CRO)

19 July 2016; 13:30	Sweden	30–25	Spain	Aegon Arena, Bratislava; Attendance: 150; Referees: Bethmann, Tzaferopoulos (GRE)
19 July 2016; 13:30	Olsson 6	(14–13)	Cesareo 7	Aegon Arena, Bratislava; Attendance: 150; Referees: Bethmann, Tzaferopoulos (GRE)
19 July 2016; 13:30	4× (yellow card) 8× (suspension)	Report	2× (yellow card) 4× (suspension)	Aegon Arena, Bratislava; Attendance: 150; Referees: Bethmann, Tzaferopoulos (GRE)

19 July 2016; 21:45	Brazil	41–14	DR Congo	Aegon Arena, Bratislava; Attendance: 50; Referees: Abid, Chaouch (TUN)
19 July 2016; 21:45	Felix 9	(19–9)	Bambi, Mwekesha 4	Aegon Arena, Bratislava; Attendance: 50; Referees: Abid, Chaouch (TUN)
19 July 2016; 21:45	3× (yellow card) 1× (suspension)	Report	2× (yellow card) 6× (suspension)	Aegon Arena, Bratislava; Attendance: 50; Referees: Abid, Chaouch (TUN)

21 July 2016; 16:00	China	21–29	Brazil	Aegon Arena, Bratislava; Attendance: 120; Referees: Năstase, Stancu (ROU)
21 July 2016; 16:00	Yang Yi. 5	(13–16)	Nogueira, A. Santos 6	Aegon Arena, Bratislava; Attendance: 120; Referees: Năstase, Stancu (ROU)
21 July 2016; 16:00	2× (yellow card) 8× (suspension)	Report	7× (yellow card) 3× (suspension)	Aegon Arena, Bratislava; Attendance: 120; Referees: Năstase, Stancu (ROU)

21 July 2016; 18:00	Spain	21–30	Hungary	Aegon Arena, Bratislava; Attendance: 1,000; Referees: Antić, Jakovljević (SRB)
21 July 2016; 18:00	Cesareo 6	(9–17)	Hornyák 14	Aegon Arena, Bratislava; Attendance: 1,000; Referees: Antić, Jakovljević (SRB)
21 July 2016; 18:00	3× (yellow card) 6× (suspension)	Report	2× (yellow card) 5× (suspension)	Aegon Arena, Bratislava; Attendance: 1,000; Referees: Antić, Jakovljević (SRB)

21 July 2016; 20:00	DR Congo	21–33	Sweden	Aegon Arena, Bratislava; Attendance: 50; Referees: Hussein, Imran (IRQ)
21 July 2016; 20:00	Bambi 7	(10–18)	Scheuer 9	Aegon Arena, Bratislava; Attendance: 50; Referees: Hussein, Imran (IRQ)
21 July 2016; 20:00	2× (yellow card) 1× (suspension)	Report	3× (yellow card) 2× (suspension)	Aegon Arena, Bratislava; Attendance: 50; Referees: Hussein, Imran (IRQ)

22 July 2016; 14:00	Hungary	38–16	DR Congo	Aegon Arena, Bratislava; Attendance: 100; Referees: Ota, Shimajiri (JPN)
22 July 2016; 14:00	Kuti 9	(19–8)	Bambi 10	Aegon Arena, Bratislava; Attendance: 100; Referees: Ota, Shimajiri (JPN)
22 July 2016; 14:00	2× (yellow card) 3× (suspension)	Report	1× (yellow card) 5× (suspension)	Aegon Arena, Bratislava; Attendance: 100; Referees: Ota, Shimajiri (JPN)

22 July 2016; 16:00	Brazil	19–22	Sweden	Aegon Arena, Bratislava; Attendance: 300; Referees: Baďura, Ondogrecula (SVK)
22 July 2016; 16:00	Oliveira 8	(11–10)	Scheuer, Stankiewicz 5	Aegon Arena, Bratislava; Attendance: 300; Referees: Baďura, Ondogrecula (SVK)
22 July 2016; 16:00	2× (yellow card) 1× (red card)	Report	3× (yellow card) 4× (suspension)	Aegon Arena, Bratislava; Attendance: 300; Referees: Baďura, Ondogrecula (SVK)

22 July 2016; 20:00	China	19–34	Spain	Aegon Arena, Bratislava; Attendance: 50; Referees: Emam, Hedeia (EGY)
22 July 2016; 20:00	Zhou 6	(6–18)	Vegue 8	Aegon Arena, Bratislava; Attendance: 50; Referees: Emam, Hedeia (EGY)
22 July 2016; 20:00	3× (yellow card) 2× (suspension)	Report	3× (yellow card) 2× (suspension)	Aegon Arena, Bratislava; Attendance: 50; Referees: Emam, Hedeia (EGY)

24 July 2016; 16:00	Brazil	29–26	Spain	Aegon Arena, Bratislava; Attendance: 150; Referees: Bethmann, Tzaferopoulos (GRE)
24 July 2016; 16:00	M. Santos 7	(13–12)	Cesareo, Cuadrado 6	Aegon Arena, Bratislava; Attendance: 150; Referees: Bethmann, Tzaferopoulos (GRE)
24 July 2016; 16:00	3× (yellow card) 5× (suspension)	Report	4× (yellow card) 1× (suspension)	Aegon Arena, Bratislava; Attendance: 150; Referees: Bethmann, Tzaferopoulos (GRE)

24 July 2016; 18:00	Sweden	21–33	Hungary	Aegon Arena, Bratislava; Attendance: 500; Referees: Leszczyński, Piechota (POL)
24 July 2016; 18:00	Flodman 5	(10–18)	Hornyák 13	Aegon Arena, Bratislava; Attendance: 500; Referees: Leszczyński, Piechota (POL)
24 July 2016; 18:00	3× (yellow card) 4× (suspension)	Report	3× (yellow card) 3× (suspension)	Aegon Arena, Bratislava; Attendance: 500; Referees: Leszczyński, Piechota (POL)

24 July 2016; 20:00	DR Congo	23–31	China	Aegon Arena, Bratislava; Attendance: 50; Referees: Năstase, Stancu (ROU)
24 July 2016; 20:00	Bambi 9	(10–14)	three players 5	Aegon Arena, Bratislava; Attendance: 50; Referees: Năstase, Stancu (ROU)
24 July 2016; 20:00	2× (yellow card) 3× (suspension)	Report	3× (yellow card) 4× (suspension)	Aegon Arena, Bratislava; Attendance: 50; Referees: Năstase, Stancu (ROU)

25 July 2016; 14:00	Hungary	28–21	Brazil	Aegon Arena, Bratislava; Referees: Pavićević, Ražnatović (MNE)
25 July 2016; 14:00	Háfra 5	(16–13)	Oliveira, M. Santos 4	Aegon Arena, Bratislava; Referees: Pavićević, Ražnatović (MNE)
25 July 2016; 14:00	2× (yellow card) 4× (suspension)	Report	4× (yellow card) 9× (suspension)	Aegon Arena, Bratislava; Referees: Pavićević, Ražnatović (MNE)

25 July 2016; 16:00	Sweden	37–26	China	Aegon Arena, Bratislava; Attendance: 200; Referees: Schilha, Schilha (GER)
25 July 2016; 16:00	Ingesson 7	(19–17)	Yang Yi., Zhou 7	Aegon Arena, Bratislava; Attendance: 200; Referees: Schilha, Schilha (GER)
25 July 2016; 16:00	2× (yellow card) 4× (suspension)	Report	2× (yellow card)	Aegon Arena, Bratislava; Attendance: 200; Referees: Schilha, Schilha (GER)

25 July 2016; 20:00	Spain	34–22	DR Congo	Aegon Arena, Bratislava; Attendance: 50; Referees: Abid, Chaouch (TUN)
25 July 2016; 20:00	González 8	(17–7)	Bambi 9	Aegon Arena, Bratislava; Attendance: 50; Referees: Abid, Chaouch (TUN)
25 July 2016; 20:00	2× (yellow card) 4× (suspension)	Report	3× (yellow card) 6× (suspension)	Aegon Arena, Bratislava; Attendance: 50; Referees: Abid, Chaouch (TUN)

=== Group C ===
Pos	Team	Pld	W	D	L	GF	GA	GD	Pts	Qualification
1	South Korea	5	5	0	0	184	132	+52	10	Quarterfinals
2	Norway	5	4	0	1	152	117	+35	8	Quarterfinals
3	France	5	3	0	2	173	138	+35	6	Quarterfinals
4	Romania	5	2	0	3	154	139	+15	4	Quarterfinals
5	Kazakhstan	5	1	0	4	116	186	−70	2	
6	Paraguay	5	0	0	5	120	187	−67	0	

Source: IHF
Rules for classification: 1) Points; 2) Head-to-head points; 3) Head-to-head goal difference; 4) Head-to-head goals scored; 5) Goal difference; 6) Goals scored; 7) Draw.

19 July 2016; 16:00	Romania	31–28	Paraguay	Ondrej Nepela Arena, Bratislava; Attendance: 100; Referees: Ota, Shimajiri (JPN)
19 July 2016; 16:00	Tîrcă 9	(15–17)	Acuña 8	Ondrej Nepela Arena, Bratislava; Attendance: 100; Referees: Ota, Shimajiri (JPN)
19 July 2016; 16:00	2× (yellow card) 5× (suspension)	Report	3× (yellow card) 9× (suspension)	Ondrej Nepela Arena, Bratislava; Attendance: 100; Referees: Ota, Shimajiri (JPN)

19 July 2016; 18:00	South Korea	30–25	Norway	Ondrej Nepela Arena, Bratislava; Attendance: 80; Referees: Alpaidze, Berezkina (RUS)
19 July 2016; 18:00	Song H. 11	(15–10)	Reistad 7	Ondrej Nepela Arena, Bratislava; Attendance: 80; Referees: Alpaidze, Berezkina (RUS)
19 July 2016; 18:00	4× (yellow card) 3× (suspension)	Report	3× (yellow card) 5× (suspension)	Ondrej Nepela Arena, Bratislava; Attendance: 80; Referees: Alpaidze, Berezkina (RUS)

19 July 2016; 20:00	France	46–20	Kazakhstan	Ondrej Nepela Arena, Bratislava; Attendance: 80; Referees: Paolantoni, Zanikian (ARG)
19 July 2016; 20:00	Deba 8	(22–5)	Usmanova 8	Ondrej Nepela Arena, Bratislava; Attendance: 80; Referees: Paolantoni, Zanikian (ARG)
19 July 2016; 20:00	3× (yellow card) 3× (suspension)	Report	2× (yellow card) 6× (suspension)	Ondrej Nepela Arena, Bratislava; Attendance: 80; Referees: Paolantoni, Zanikian (ARG)

20 July 2016; 16:00	Paraguay	22–39	South Korea	Ondrej Nepela Arena, Bratislava; Attendance: 50; Referees: Kulik, Nabokau (BLR)
20 July 2016; 16:00	Feschenko, Insfrán 6	(10–20)	Choi Ji-h. 9	Ondrej Nepela Arena, Bratislava; Attendance: 50; Referees: Kulik, Nabokau (BLR)
20 July 2016; 16:00	3× (yellow card) 9× (suspension)	Report	3× (yellow card) 5× (suspension)	Ondrej Nepela Arena, Bratislava; Attendance: 50; Referees: Kulik, Nabokau (BLR)

20 July 2016; 18:00	Kazakhstan	17–35	Romania	Ondrej Nepela Arena, Bratislava; Attendance: 50; Referees: Li, Liu (CHN)
20 July 2016; 18:00	Serikbayeva 5	(8–19)	Tecar, Tîrcă 6	Ondrej Nepela Arena, Bratislava; Attendance: 50; Referees: Li, Liu (CHN)
20 July 2016; 18:00	2× (yellow card) 2× (suspension) 1× (red card)	Report	3× (yellow card) 5× (suspension)	Ondrej Nepela Arena, Bratislava; Attendance: 50; Referees: Li, Liu (CHN)

20 July 2016; 20:00	Norway	31–22	France	Ondrej Nepela Arena, Bratislava; Attendance: 300; Referees: Pavićević, Ražnatović (MNE)
20 July 2016; 20:00	Nestaker 8	(15–11)	Mauny, Sagna 6	Ondrej Nepela Arena, Bratislava; Attendance: 300; Referees: Pavićević, Ražnatović (MNE)
20 July 2016; 20:00	3× (yellow card) 9× (suspension) 1× (red card)	Report	3× (yellow card) 5× (suspension)	Ondrej Nepela Arena, Bratislava; Attendance: 300; Referees: Pavićević, Ražnatović (MNE)

22 July 2016; 10:00	Romania	22–25	Norway	Ondrej Nepela Arena, Bratislava; Attendance: 100; Referees: Lončar, Lončar (CRO)
22 July 2016; 10:00	Tîrcă 9	(9–13)	Ellertsen 10	Ondrej Nepela Arena, Bratislava; Attendance: 100; Referees: Lončar, Lončar (CRO)
22 July 2016; 10:00	3× (yellow card) 5× (suspension) 1× (red card)	Report	2× (yellow card) 4× (suspension) 1× (red card)	Ondrej Nepela Arena, Bratislava; Attendance: 100; Referees: Lončar, Lončar (CRO)

22 July 2016; 12:00	South Korea	37–31	France	Ondrej Nepela Arena, Bratislava; Attendance: 120; Referees: Bethmann, Tzaferopoulos (GRE)
22 July 2016; 12:00	Gim, Kim So-y. 10	(21–13)	Sagna 6	Ondrej Nepela Arena, Bratislava; Attendance: 120; Referees: Bethmann, Tzaferopoulos (GRE)
22 July 2016; 12:00	4× (yellow card) 2× (suspension)	Report	4× (yellow card) 1× (suspension)	Ondrej Nepela Arena, Bratislava; Attendance: 120; Referees: Bethmann, Tzaferopoulos (GRE)

22 July 2016; 14:00	Paraguay	30–38	Kazakhstan	Ondrej Nepela Arena, Bratislava; Attendance: 150; Referees: Hussein, Imran (IRQ)
22 July 2016; 14:00	Acuña 9	(13–17)	Usmanova 8	Ondrej Nepela Arena, Bratislava; Attendance: 150; Referees: Hussein, Imran (IRQ)
22 July 2016; 14:00	2× (yellow card) 6× (suspension) 1× (red card)	Report	3× (yellow card) 5× (suspension)	Ondrej Nepela Arena, Bratislava; Attendance: 150; Referees: Hussein, Imran (IRQ)

23 July 2016; 16:00	South Korea	39–17	Kazakhstan	Ondrej Nepela Arena, Bratislava; Attendance: 100; Referees: Lončar, Lončar (CRO)
23 July 2016; 16:00	Seo 10	(22–7)	Serikbayeva 4	Ondrej Nepela Arena, Bratislava; Attendance: 100; Referees: Lončar, Lončar (CRO)
23 July 2016; 16:00	1× (yellow card) 3× (suspension)	Report	1× (yellow card) 5× (suspension) 1× (red card)	Ondrej Nepela Arena, Bratislava; Attendance: 100; Referees: Lončar, Lončar (CRO)

23 July 2016; 18:00	France	30–29	Romania	Ondrej Nepela Arena, Bratislava; Attendance: 200; Referees: Alpaidze, Berezkina (RUS)
23 July 2016; 18:00	four players 5	(14–11)	Tîrcă 11	Ondrej Nepela Arena, Bratislava; Attendance: 200; Referees: Alpaidze, Berezkina (RUS)
23 July 2016; 18:00	3× (yellow card) 8× (suspension)	Report	3× (yellow card) 7× (suspension)	Ondrej Nepela Arena, Bratislava; Attendance: 200; Referees: Alpaidze, Berezkina (RUS)

23 July 2016; 20:00	Norway	35–19	Paraguay	Ondrej Nepela Arena, Bratislava; Attendance: 100; Referees: Schilha, Schilha (GER)
23 July 2016; 20:00	Dahl 8	(12–13)	Feschenko 8	Ondrej Nepela Arena, Bratislava; Attendance: 100; Referees: Schilha, Schilha (GER)
23 July 2016; 20:00	1× (yellow card) 3× (suspension)	Report	2× (yellow card) 3× (suspension)	Ondrej Nepela Arena, Bratislava; Attendance: 100; Referees: Schilha, Schilha (GER)

25 July 2016; 10:00	Kazakhstan	24–36	Norway	Ondrej Nepela Arena, Bratislava; Attendance: 50; Referees: Emam, Hedeia (EGY)
25 July 2016; 10:00	Bikbova, Sitnikova 4	(11–18)	Ellertsen, Lund 6	Ondrej Nepela Arena, Bratislava; Attendance: 50; Referees: Emam, Hedeia (EGY)
25 July 2016; 10:00	3× (yellow card) 5× (suspension)	Report	3× (yellow card) 4× (suspension)	Ondrej Nepela Arena, Bratislava; Attendance: 50; Referees: Emam, Hedeia (EGY)

25 July 2016; 12:00	France	44–21	Paraguay	Ondrej Nepela Arena, Bratislava; Attendance: 70; Referees: Antić, Jakovljević (SRB)
25 July 2016; 12:00	Plotton 6	(18–9)	Insfrán 6	Ondrej Nepela Arena, Bratislava; Attendance: 70; Referees: Antić, Jakovljević (SRB)
25 July 2016; 12:00	2× (yellow card) 6× (suspension)	Report	3× (yellow card) 6× (suspension)	Ondrej Nepela Arena, Bratislava; Attendance: 70; Referees: Antić, Jakovljević (SRB)

25 July 2016; 14:00	Romania	37–39	South Korea	Ondrej Nepela Arena, Bratislava; Attendance: 100; Referees: Baďura, Ondogrecula (SVK)
25 July 2016; 14:00	Tîrcă 12	(17–17)	Gim 18	Ondrej Nepela Arena, Bratislava; Attendance: 100; Referees: Baďura, Ondogrecula (SVK)
25 July 2016; 14:00	3× (yellow card) 3× (suspension)	Report	2× (yellow card) 5× (suspension)	Ondrej Nepela Arena, Bratislava; Attendance: 100; Referees: Baďura, Ondogrecula (SVK)

=== Group D ===
Pos	Team	Pld	W	D	L	GF	GA	GD	Pts	Qualification
1	Denmark	5	5	0	0	172	85	+87	10	Quarterfinals
2	Egypt	5	4	0	1	157	155	+2	8	Quarterfinals
3	Slovakia	5	3	0	2	139	118	+21	6	Quarterfinals
4	Slovenia	5	2	0	3	159	140	+19	4	Quarterfinals
5	Argentina	5	1	0	4	131	160	−29	2	
6	Uzbekistan	5	0	0	5	105	205	−100	0	

Source: IHF
Rules for classification: 1) Points; 2) Head-to-head points; 3) Head-to-head goal difference; 4) Head-to-head goals scored; 5) Goal difference; 6) Goals scored; 7) Draw.

19 July 2016; 15:30	Denmark	34–20	Egypt	Aegon Arena, Bratislava; Attendance: 150; Referees: Kulik, Nabokau (BLR)
19 July 2016; 15:30	Friis 6	(16–10)	Sabry 6	Aegon Arena, Bratislava; Attendance: 150; Referees: Kulik, Nabokau (BLR)
19 July 2016; 15:30	3× (yellow card) 8× (suspension)	Report	3× (yellow card) 5× (suspension)	Aegon Arena, Bratislava; Attendance: 150; Referees: Kulik, Nabokau (BLR)

19 July 2016; 18:00	Slovakia	32–19	Argentina	Aegon Arena, Bratislava; Attendance: 2,000; Referees: Antić, Jakovljević (SRB)
19 July 2016; 18:00	Kostelná, Nejedlíková 7	(14–10)	Cavo 6	Aegon Arena, Bratislava; Attendance: 2,000; Referees: Antić, Jakovljević (SRB)
19 July 2016; 18:00	2× (yellow card) 3× (suspension)	Report	3× (yellow card) 5× (suspension)	Aegon Arena, Bratislava; Attendance: 2,000; Referees: Antić, Jakovljević (SRB)

19 July 2016; 20:00	Slovenia	48–25	Uzbekistan	Aegon Arena, Bratislava; Attendance: 100; Referees: Li, Liu (CHN)
19 July 2016; 20:00	Vončina 10	(26–14)	Abdumannonova 10	Aegon Arena, Bratislava; Attendance: 100; Referees: Li, Liu (CHN)
19 July 2016; 20:00	3× (yellow card) 4× (suspension)	Report	2× (yellow card) 2× (suspension)	Aegon Arena, Bratislava; Attendance: 100; Referees: Li, Liu (CHN)

20 July 2016; 16:00	Egypt	32–31	Slovenia	Aegon Arena, Bratislava; Attendance: 150; Referees: Schilha, Schilha (GER)
20 July 2016; 16:00	Ali Ahmad 11	(16–18)	Strnad 9	Aegon Arena, Bratislava; Attendance: 150; Referees: Schilha, Schilha (GER)
20 July 2016; 16:00	3× (yellow card) 10× (suspension) 1× (red card)	Report	3× (yellow card) 11× (suspension)	Aegon Arena, Bratislava; Attendance: 150; Referees: Schilha, Schilha (GER)

20 July 2016; 18:00	Uzbekistan	16–43	Slovakia	Aegon Arena, Bratislava; Attendance: 250; Referees: Abid, Chaouch (TUN)
20 July 2016; 18:00	Abdumannonova, Vosiljonova 5	(7–22)	Bajčiová 6	Aegon Arena, Bratislava; Attendance: 250; Referees: Abid, Chaouch (TUN)
20 July 2016; 18:00	3× (yellow card) 5× (suspension)	Report	3× (yellow card) 3× (suspension)	Aegon Arena, Bratislava; Attendance: 250; Referees: Abid, Chaouch (TUN)

20 July 2016; 20:00	Argentina	16–34	Denmark	Aegon Arena, Bratislava; Attendance: 120; Referees: Ota, Shimajiri (JPN)
20 July 2016; 20:00	Cavo 6	(7–16)	Bruus, Elver 5	Aegon Arena, Bratislava; Attendance: 120; Referees: Ota, Shimajiri (JPN)
20 July 2016; 20:00	2× (yellow card) 5× (suspension)	Report	3× (yellow card) 2× (suspension)	Aegon Arena, Bratislava; Attendance: 120; Referees: Ota, Shimajiri (JPN)

22 July 2016; 10:00	Denmark	45–12	Uzbekistan	Aegon Arena, Bratislava; Attendance: 100; Referees: Năstase, Stancu (ROU)
22 July 2016; 10:00	Lundgreen 7	(18–5)	Abdumannonova 4	Aegon Arena, Bratislava; Attendance: 100; Referees: Năstase, Stancu (ROU)
22 July 2016; 10:00	3× (yellow card) 1× (suspension)	Report	3× (yellow card) 3× (suspension)	Aegon Arena, Bratislava; Attendance: 100; Referees: Năstase, Stancu (ROU)

22 July 2016; 12:00	Egypt	35–33	Argentina	Aegon Arena, Bratislava; Referees: Li, Liu (CHN)
22 July 2016; 12:00	Sabry 13	(20–15)	Cavo 12	Aegon Arena, Bratislava; Referees: Li, Liu (CHN)
22 July 2016; 12:00	1× (yellow card) 5× (suspension)	Report	3× (yellow card) 5× (suspension)	Aegon Arena, Bratislava; Referees: Li, Liu (CHN)

22 July 2016; 18:00	Slovenia	21–22	Slovakia	Aegon Arena, Bratislava; Referees: Leszczyński, Piechota (POL)
22 July 2016; 18:00	Copi, Vončina 4	(11–12)	five players 3	Aegon Arena, Bratislava; Referees: Leszczyński, Piechota (POL)
22 July 2016; 18:00	4× (yellow card) 1× (suspension)	Report	3× (yellow card) 1× (suspension)	Aegon Arena, Bratislava; Referees: Leszczyński, Piechota (POL)

23 July 2016; 16:00	Slovenia	36–30	Argentina	Aegon Arena, Bratislava; Attendance: 250; Referees: Kulik, Nabokau (BLR)
23 July 2016; 16:00	Kodele 9	(18–14)	Alonso 8	Aegon Arena, Bratislava; Attendance: 250; Referees: Kulik, Nabokau (BLR)
23 July 2016; 16:00	3× (yellow card) 7× (suspension)	Report	4× (yellow card) 4× (suspension) 1× (red card)	Aegon Arena, Bratislava; Attendance: 250; Referees: Kulik, Nabokau (BLR)

23 July 2016; 18:00	Slovakia	14–28	Denmark	Aegon Arena, Bratislava; Attendance: 1,000; Referees: Pavićević, Ražnatović (MNE)
23 July 2016; 18:00	Trunková 3	(8–17)	Friis 9	Aegon Arena, Bratislava; Attendance: 1,000; Referees: Pavićević, Ražnatović (MNE)
23 July 2016; 18:00	2× (yellow card) 1× (suspension)	Report	3× (yellow card) 4× (suspension)	Aegon Arena, Bratislava; Attendance: 1,000; Referees: Pavićević, Ražnatović (MNE)

23 July 2016; 20:00	Uzbekistan	29–36	Egypt	Aegon Arena, Bratislava; Attendance: 75; Referees: Hussein, Imran (IRQ)
23 July 2016; 20:00	Abdumannonova 8	(18–18)	Ali Ahmad 12	Aegon Arena, Bratislava; Attendance: 75; Referees: Hussein, Imran (IRQ)
23 July 2016; 20:00	2× (yellow card) 3× (suspension)	Report	2× (yellow card) 1× (suspension)	Aegon Arena, Bratislava; Attendance: 75; Referees: Hussein, Imran (IRQ)

25 July 2016; 10:00	Argentina	33–23	Uzbekistan	Aegon Arena, Bratislava; Attendance: 50; Referees: Ota, Shimajiri (JPN)
25 July 2016; 10:00	Alonso, Pedernera 8	(17–11)	three players 4	Aegon Arena, Bratislava; Attendance: 50; Referees: Ota, Shimajiri (JPN)
25 July 2016; 10:00	2× (yellow card) 4× (suspension)	Report	2× (yellow card) 7× (suspension)	Aegon Arena, Bratislava; Attendance: 50; Referees: Ota, Shimajiri (JPN)

25 July 2016; 12:00	Denmark	31–23	Slovenia	Aegon Arena, Bratislava; Attendance: 100; Referees: Alpaidze, Berezkina (RUS)
25 July 2016; 12:00	Dahl 5	(14–13)	Strnad 5	Aegon Arena, Bratislava; Attendance: 100; Referees: Alpaidze, Berezkina (RUS)
25 July 2016; 12:00	3× (yellow card) 3× (suspension)	Report	2× (yellow card) 3× (suspension)	Aegon Arena, Bratislava; Attendance: 100; Referees: Alpaidze, Berezkina (RUS)

25 July 2016; 18:00	Slovakia	28–34	Egypt	Aegon Arena, Bratislava; Attendance: 1,050; Referees: Kulik, Nabokau (BLR)
25 July 2016; 18:00	Bajčiová 9	(11–17)	Ali Ahmad 12	Aegon Arena, Bratislava; Attendance: 1,050; Referees: Kulik, Nabokau (BLR)
25 July 2016; 18:00	3× (yellow card) 6× (suspension)	Report	3× (yellow card) 8× (suspension)	Aegon Arena, Bratislava; Attendance: 1,050; Referees: Kulik, Nabokau (BLR)

== President's Cup ==
=== 21st place bracket ===
21–24th place semifinals
27 July
Chile	30
DR Congo	21
27 July
Paraguay	48
Uzbekistan	29

21st place
28 July
Chile	23
Paraguay	27
23rd place
28 July
DR Congo	31
Uzbekistan	23

==== 21–24th place semifinals ====
27 July 2016; 09:30	Chile	30–21	DR Congo	Ondrej Nepela Arena, Bratislava; Attendance: 30; Referees: Pavićević, Ražnatović (MNE)
27 July 2016; 09:30	Pérez 6	(15–13)	Nsolo 7	Ondrej Nepela Arena, Bratislava; Attendance: 30; Referees: Pavićević, Ražnatović (MNE)
27 July 2016; 09:30	2× (yellow card) 4× (suspension)	Report	2× (yellow card) 5× (suspension)	Ondrej Nepela Arena, Bratislava; Attendance: 30; Referees: Pavićević, Ražnatović (MNE)

27 July 2016; 09:30	Paraguay	48–29	Uzbekistan	Aegon Arena, Bratislava; Attendance: 50; Referees: Hussein, Imran (IRQ)
27 July 2016; 09:30	Acuña, Insfrán 11	(28–15)	Razakbergenova 9	Aegon Arena, Bratislava; Attendance: 50; Referees: Hussein, Imran (IRQ)
27 July 2016; 09:30	3× (yellow card) 3× (suspension)	Report	3× (yellow card) 5× (suspension)	Aegon Arena, Bratislava; Attendance: 50; Referees: Hussein, Imran (IRQ)

==== 23rd place game ====
28 July 2016; 09:30	DR Congo	31–23	Uzbekistan	Aegon Arena, Bratislava; Attendance: 20; Referees: Abid, Chaouch (TUN)
28 July 2016; 09:30	Bambi 10	(13–10)	Abdumannonova, Vosiljonova 6	Aegon Arena, Bratislava; Attendance: 20; Referees: Abid, Chaouch (TUN)
28 July 2016; 09:30	1× (yellow card) 2× (suspension)	Report	3× (yellow card) 5× (suspension)	Aegon Arena, Bratislava; Attendance: 20; Referees: Abid, Chaouch (TUN)

==== 21st place game ====
28 July 2016; 11:45	Chile	23–27	Paraguay	Aegon Arena, Bratislava; Referees: Ota, Shimajiri (JPN)
28 July 2016; 11:45	Gómez, Pérez 6	(9–13)	Feschenko, Acuña 5	Aegon Arena, Bratislava; Referees: Ota, Shimajiri (JPN)
28 July 2016; 11:45	3× (yellow card) 4× (suspension)	Report	3× (yellow card) 5× (suspension)	Aegon Arena, Bratislava; Referees: Ota, Shimajiri (JPN)

=== 17th place bracket ===
17–20th place semifinals
27 July
Japan	30
China	21
27 July
Kazakhstan	17
Argentina	29

17th place
28 July
Japan	32
Argentina	31
19th place
28 July
China	28
Kazakhstan	31

==== 17–20th place semifinals ====
27 July 2016; 11:45	Japan	30–21	China	Ondrej Nepela Arena, Bratislava; Attendance: 70; Referees: Schilha, Schilha (GER)
27 July 2016; 11:45	Yoshioka 7	(16–10)	four players 3	Ondrej Nepela Arena, Bratislava; Attendance: 70; Referees: Schilha, Schilha (GER)
27 July 2016; 11:45	2× (yellow card) 3× (suspension) 1× (red card)	Report	3× (yellow card) 2× (suspension)	Ondrej Nepela Arena, Bratislava; Attendance: 70; Referees: Schilha, Schilha (GER)

27 July 2016; 11:45	Kazakhstan	17–29	Argentina	Aegon Arena, Bratislava; Attendance: 100; Referees: Năstase, Stancu (ROU)
27 July 2016; 11:45	Pupchenkova 5	(8–13)	Alonso 7	Aegon Arena, Bratislava; Attendance: 100; Referees: Năstase, Stancu (ROU)
27 July 2016; 11:45	2× (yellow card) 6× (suspension)	Report	3× (yellow card) 4× (suspension)	Aegon Arena, Bratislava; Attendance: 100; Referees: Năstase, Stancu (ROU)

==== 19th place game ====
28 July 2016; 09:30	China	28–31	Kazakhstan	Ondrej Nepela Arena, Bratislava; Attendance: 55; Referees: Hussein, Imran (IRQ)
28 July 2016; 09:30	Huang 9	(11–12)	Ussenova 10	Ondrej Nepela Arena, Bratislava; Attendance: 55; Referees: Hussein, Imran (IRQ)
28 July 2016; 09:30	3× (yellow card) 4× (suspension)	Report	3× (yellow card) 5× (suspension)	Ondrej Nepela Arena, Bratislava; Attendance: 55; Referees: Hussein, Imran (IRQ)

==== 17th place game ====
28 July 2016; 11:45	Japan	32–31	Argentina	Ondrej Nepela Arena, Bratislava; Attendance: 100; Referees: Antić, Jakovljević (SRB)
28 July 2016; 11:45	Nakayama 10	(18–14)	Alonso 10	Ondrej Nepela Arena, Bratislava; Attendance: 100; Referees: Antić, Jakovljević (SRB)
28 July 2016; 11:45	3× (yellow card) 6× (suspension)	Report	2× (yellow card) 5× (suspension)	Ondrej Nepela Arena, Bratislava; Attendance: 100; Referees: Antić, Jakovljević (SRB)

== 9–16th placement games ==
The eight losers of the round of 16 were seeded according to their results in the preliminary round against teams ranked 1–4.

=== Ranking ===
Pos	Team	Pld	W	D	L	GF	GA	GD	Pts
1	Egypt	3	2	0	1	86	93	−7	4
2	Angola	3	1	0	2	80	81	−1	2
3	Brazil	3	1	0	2	69	76	−7	2
4	Germany	3	1	0	2	69	77	−8	2
5	Slovakia	3	1	0	2	64	83	−19	2
6	Romania	3	0	0	3	88	94	−6	0
7	Slovenia	3	0	0	3	75	85	−10	0
8	Spain	3	0	0	3	72	89	−17	0

Source: IHF
Rules for classification: 1) points; 2) Goal difference.

=== 15th place game ===
28 July 2016; 14:00	Slovenia	27–32	Spain	Aegon Arena, Bratislava; Attendance: 100; Referees: Schilha, Schilha (GER)
28 July 2016; 14:00	Vončina 8	(13–18)	Cuadrado 6	Aegon Arena, Bratislava; Attendance: 100; Referees: Schilha, Schilha (GER)
28 July 2016; 14:00	3× (yellow card) 5× (suspension)	Report	1× (yellow card) 5× (suspension)	Aegon Arena, Bratislava; Attendance: 100; Referees: Schilha, Schilha (GER)

=== 13th place game ===
28 July 2016; 16:15	Slovakia	25–21	Romania	Aegon Arena, Bratislava; Attendance: 300; Referees: Leszczyński, Piechota (POL)
28 July 2016; 16:15	Holejova 8	(11–13)	Tîrcă 11	Aegon Arena, Bratislava; Attendance: 300; Referees: Leszczyński, Piechota (POL)
28 July 2016; 16:15	3× (yellow card) 5× (suspension)	Report	3× (yellow card) 4× (suspension)	Aegon Arena, Bratislava; Attendance: 300; Referees: Leszczyński, Piechota (POL)

=== Eleventh place game ===
28 July 2016; 14:00	Brazil	17–18	Germany	Ondrej Nepela Arena, Bratislava; Attendance: 75; Referees: Li, Liu (CHN)
28 July 2016; 14:00	G. Santos 7	(9–6)	Peter 7	Ondrej Nepela Arena, Bratislava; Attendance: 75; Referees: Li, Liu (CHN)
28 July 2016; 14:00	3× (yellow card) 4× (suspension)	Report	3× (yellow card) 2× (suspension)	Ondrej Nepela Arena, Bratislava; Attendance: 75; Referees: Li, Liu (CHN)

=== Ninth place game ===
28 July 2016; 16:15	Egypt	33–26	Angola	Ondrej Nepela Arena, Bratislava; Attendance: 100; Referees: Năstase, Stancu (ROU)
28 July 2016; 16:15	Sabry 9	(14–12)	Santana 7	Ondrej Nepela Arena, Bratislava; Attendance: 100; Referees: Năstase, Stancu (ROU)
28 July 2016; 16:15	1× (yellow card) 3× (suspension)	Report	3× (yellow card) 9× (suspension)	Ondrej Nepela Arena, Bratislava; Attendance: 100; Referees: Năstase, Stancu (ROU)

== Knockout stage ==
=== Bracket ===
Round of 16
27 July
Russia	33
Spain	27
27 July
Egypt	25
France	46
27 July
Sweden	22
Germany	20
27 July
South Korea	33
Slovenia	30
27 July
Hungary	32
Angola	23
27 July
Norway	30
Slovakia	19
27 July
Croatia	24
Brazil	21
27 July
Denmark (OT)	30
Romania	29

Quarterfinals
28 July
Russia	24
France	19
28 July
Sweden	24
South Korea	27
28 July
Hungary	27
Norway	28
28 July
Croatia	20
Denmark	30

Semifinals
30 July
Russia	27
South Korea	23
30 July
Norway	18
Denmark	27

Final
31 July
Russia	30
Denmark	22
Third place
31 July
South Korea	32
Norway	30

5th place bracket

5–8th place semifinals
30 July
France	28
Sweden	26
30 July
Hungary	31
Croatia	22

Fifth place
31 July
France	31
Hungary	34
Seventh place
31 July
Sweden	23
Croatia	18

=== Round of 16 ===
27 July 2016; 14:00	Hungary	32–23	Angola	Ondrej Nepela Arena, Bratislava; Attendance: 150; Referees: Antić, Jakovljević (SRB)
27 July 2016; 14:00	three players 6	(13–15)	Irinela 10	Ondrej Nepela Arena, Bratislava; Attendance: 150; Referees: Antić, Jakovljević (SRB)
27 July 2016; 14:00	2× (yellow card) 2× (suspension)	Report	3× (yellow card) 3× (suspension)	Ondrej Nepela Arena, Bratislava; Attendance: 150; Referees: Antić, Jakovljević (SRB)

27 July 2016; 14:00	France	46–25	Egypt	Aegon Arena, Bratislava; Attendance: 50; Referees: Lončar, Lončar (CRO)
27 July 2016; 14:00	Lassource 7	(19–14)	Sabry 7	Aegon Arena, Bratislava; Attendance: 50; Referees: Lončar, Lončar (CRO)
27 July 2016; 14:00	2× (yellow card) 4× (suspension)	Report	3× (yellow card) 2× (suspension)	Aegon Arena, Bratislava; Attendance: 50; Referees: Lončar, Lončar (CRO)

27 July 2016; 16:15	Russia	33–27	Spain	Ondrej Nepela Arena, Bratislava; Attendance: 150; Referees: Li, Liu (CHN)
27 July 2016; 16:15	Sabirova 10	(19–11)	Mbengue 7	Ondrej Nepela Arena, Bratislava; Attendance: 150; Referees: Li, Liu (CHN)
27 July 2016; 16:15	4× (yellow card) 2× (suspension)	Report	3× (yellow card) 2× (suspension)	Ondrej Nepela Arena, Bratislava; Attendance: 150; Referees: Li, Liu (CHN)

27 July 2016
16:15
Denmark
30–29 (ET)
Romania
Aegon Arena, Bratislava
Attendance: 1,000
Referees: Kulik, Nabokau (BLR)
Friis 8
(11–14)
Bucur 11
3× (yellow card) 4× (suspension)
Report
3× (yellow card) 2× (suspension)

FT: 26–26 ET: 4–3

27 July 2016; 18:30	Brazil	21–24	Croatia	Ondrej Nepela Arena, Bratislava; Attendance: 200; Referees: Leszczyński, Piechota (POL)
27 July 2016; 18:30	Oliveira 6	(14–12)	Japundža 10	Ondrej Nepela Arena, Bratislava; Attendance: 200; Referees: Leszczyński, Piechota (POL)
27 July 2016; 18:30	3× (yellow card) 4× (suspension)	Report	4× (yellow card) 4× (suspension)	Ondrej Nepela Arena, Bratislava; Attendance: 200; Referees: Leszczyński, Piechota (POL)

27 July 2016; 18:30	Slovakia	19–30	Norway	Aegon Arena, Bratislava; Attendance: 1,500; Referees: Paolantoni, Zanikian (ARG)
27 July 2016; 18:30	Holejova 8	(10–12)	Bergum, Nestaker 5	Aegon Arena, Bratislava; Attendance: 1,500; Referees: Paolantoni, Zanikian (ARG)
27 July 2016; 18:30	1× (yellow card) 2× (suspension) 1× (red card)	Report	1× (yellow card) 5× (suspension)	Aegon Arena, Bratislava; Attendance: 1,500; Referees: Paolantoni, Zanikian (ARG)

27 July 2016; 20:45	Germany	20–22	Sweden	Ondrej Nepela Arena, Bratislava; Attendance: 150; Referees: Baďura, Ondogrecula (SVK)
27 July 2016; 20:45	Bayerl, Hurst 5	(11–13)	five players 4	Ondrej Nepela Arena, Bratislava; Attendance: 150; Referees: Baďura, Ondogrecula (SVK)
27 July 2016; 20:45	3× (yellow card) 3× (suspension)	Report	3× (yellow card) 6× (suspension)	Ondrej Nepela Arena, Bratislava; Attendance: 150; Referees: Baďura, Ondogrecula (SVK)

27 July 2016; 20:45	South Korea	33–30	Slovenia	Aegon Arena, Bratislava; Attendance: 150; Referees: Emam, Hedeia (EGY)
27 July 2016; 20:45	Gim 11	(19–14)	three players 5	Aegon Arena, Bratislava; Attendance: 150; Referees: Emam, Hedeia (EGY)
27 July 2016; 20:45	3× (yellow card) 5× (suspension)	Report	2× (yellow card) 3× (suspension)	Aegon Arena, Bratislava; Attendance: 150; Referees: Emam, Hedeia (EGY)

=== Quarterfinals ===
28 July 2016; 18:30	Hungary	27–28	Norway	Ondrej Nepela Arena, Bratislava; Attendance: 500; Referees: Bethmann, Tzaferopoulos (GRE)
28 July 2016; 18:30	Hornyák 6	(16–18)	Reistad 9	Ondrej Nepela Arena, Bratislava; Attendance: 500; Referees: Bethmann, Tzaferopoulos (GRE)
28 July 2016; 18:30	2× (yellow card) 2× (suspension)	Report	3× (yellow card) 3× (suspension)	Ondrej Nepela Arena, Bratislava; Attendance: 500; Referees: Bethmann, Tzaferopoulos (GRE)

28 July 2016; 18:30	France	19–24	Russia	Aegon Arena, Bratislava; Attendance: 100; Referees: Baďura, Ondogrecula (SVK)
28 July 2016; 18:30	Mauny 8	(8–13)	Sabirova, Skorobogatchenko 7	Aegon Arena, Bratislava; Attendance: 100; Referees: Baďura, Ondogrecula (SVK)
28 July 2016; 18:30	2× (yellow card) 4× (suspension)	Report	3× (yellow card) 4× (suspension)	Aegon Arena, Bratislava; Attendance: 100; Referees: Baďura, Ondogrecula (SVK)

28 July 2016; 20:45	Croatia	20–30	Denmark	Ondrej Nepela Arena, Bratislava; Attendance: 220; Referees: Alpaidze, Berezkina (RUS)
28 July 2016; 20:45	Japundža, Kalčić 6	(10–14)	Friis 6	Ondrej Nepela Arena, Bratislava; Attendance: 220; Referees: Alpaidze, Berezkina (RUS)
28 July 2016; 20:45	3× (yellow card) 5× (suspension)	Report	2× (yellow card) 1× (suspension)	Ondrej Nepela Arena, Bratislava; Attendance: 220; Referees: Alpaidze, Berezkina (RUS)

28 July 2016; 20:45	Sweden	24–27	South Korea	Aegon Arena, Bratislava; Attendance: 250; Referees: Pavićević, Ražnatović (MNE)
28 July 2016; 20:45	Ingesson, Scheuer 4	(12–12)	Gim 10	Aegon Arena, Bratislava; Attendance: 250; Referees: Pavićević, Ražnatović (MNE)
28 July 2016; 20:45	2× (yellow card) 8× (suspension)	Report	3× (yellow card) 5× (suspension)	Aegon Arena, Bratislava; Attendance: 250; Referees: Pavićević, Ražnatović (MNE)

=== 5–8th place semifinals ===
30 July 2016; 12:30	Hungary	31–22	Croatia	Aegon Arena, Bratislava; Attendance: 100; Referees: Emam, Hedeia (EGY)
30 July 2016; 12:30	Hornyák 7	(13–10)	Japundža, Mrđen 6	Aegon Arena, Bratislava; Attendance: 100; Referees: Emam, Hedeia (EGY)
30 July 2016; 12:30	2× (yellow card) 3× (suspension)	Report	3× (yellow card) 2× (suspension)	Aegon Arena, Bratislava; Attendance: 100; Referees: Emam, Hedeia (EGY)

30 July 2016; 15:00	France	28–26	Sweden	Aegon Arena, Bratislava; Attendance: 100; Referees: Baďura, Ondogrecula (SVK)
30 July 2016; 15:00	Tourigny, Vautier 5	(16–15)	Flodman 5	Aegon Arena, Bratislava; Attendance: 100; Referees: Baďura, Ondogrecula (SVK)
30 July 2016; 15:00	2× (yellow card) 3× (suspension)	Report	2× (yellow card) 1× (suspension)	Aegon Arena, Bratislava; Attendance: 100; Referees: Baďura, Ondogrecula (SVK)

=== Semifinals ===
30 July 2016; 17:30	Norway	18–27	Denmark	Aegon Arena, Bratislava; Attendance: 450; Referees: Lončar, Lončar (CRO)
30 July 2016; 17:30	Lund, Nestaker 3	(10–11)	Friis 6	Aegon Arena, Bratislava; Attendance: 450; Referees: Lončar, Lončar (CRO)
30 July 2016; 17:30	2× (yellow card) 1× (suspension)	Report	1× (yellow card) 2× (suspension)	Aegon Arena, Bratislava; Attendance: 450; Referees: Lončar, Lončar (CRO)

30 July 2016; 20:00	Russia	27–23	South Korea	Aegon Arena, Bratislava; Attendance: 800; Referees: Bethmann, Tzaferopoulos (GRE)
30 July 2016; 20:00	Dudina 7	(13–9)	Kim So-y. 7	Aegon Arena, Bratislava; Attendance: 800; Referees: Bethmann, Tzaferopoulos (GRE)
30 July 2016; 20:00	3× (yellow card) 4× (suspension)	Report	1× (yellow card) 1× (suspension)	Aegon Arena, Bratislava; Attendance: 800; Referees: Bethmann, Tzaferopoulos (GRE)

=== Seventh place game ===
31 July 2016; 10:30	Croatia	18–23	Sweden	Aegon Arena, Bratislava; Attendance: 100; Referees: Li, Liu (CHN)
31 July 2016; 10:30	Mrazović 6	(10–10)	Scheuer 4	Aegon Arena, Bratislava; Attendance: 100; Referees: Li, Liu (CHN)
31 July 2016; 10:30	1× (yellow card) 3× (suspension)	Report	2× (yellow card) 1× (suspension)	Aegon Arena, Bratislava; Attendance: 100; Referees: Li, Liu (CHN)

=== Fifth place game ===
31 July 2016; 13:00	Hungary	34–31	France	Aegon Arena, Bratislava; Attendance: 100; Referees: Paolantoni, Zanikian (ARG)
31 July 2016; 13:00	Hornyak 11	(18–16)	Sagna 11	Aegon Arena, Bratislava; Attendance: 100; Referees: Paolantoni, Zanikian (ARG)
31 July 2016; 13:00	2× (yellow card) 2× (suspension)	Report	4× (yellow card) 5× (suspension)	Aegon Arena, Bratislava; Attendance: 100; Referees: Paolantoni, Zanikian (ARG)

=== Third place game ===
31 July 2016; 15:30	South Korea	32–30	Norway	Aegon Arena, Bratislava; Attendance: 1,000; Referees: Alpaidze, Berezkina (RUS)
31 July 2016; 15:30	Gim 11	(16–17)	Ellertsen 7	Aegon Arena, Bratislava; Attendance: 1,000; Referees: Alpaidze, Berezkina (RUS)
31 July 2016; 15:30	1× (yellow card) 4× (suspension)	Report	3× (yellow card) 1× (suspension)	Aegon Arena, Bratislava; Attendance: 1,000; Referees: Alpaidze, Berezkina (RUS)

=== Final ===
31 July 2016; 18:00	Russia	30–22	Denmark	Aegon Arena, Bratislava; Attendance: 600; Referees: Pavićević, Ražnatović (MNE)
31 July 2016; 18:00	Sabirova 10	(15–13)	Dahl, Jensen 6	Aegon Arena, Bratislava; Attendance: 600; Referees: Pavićević, Ražnatović (MNE)
31 July 2016; 18:00	1× (yellow card) 7× (suspension)	Report	3× (yellow card) 5× (suspension)	Aegon Arena, Bratislava; Attendance: 600; Referees: Pavićević, Ražnatović (MNE)

== Final ranking ==
Rank	Team
Gold medal	Russia
Silver medal	Denmark
Bronze medal	South Korea
4	Norway
5	Hungary
6	France
7	Sweden
8	Croatia
9	Egypt
10	Angola
11	Germany
12	Brazil
13	Slovakia
14	Romania
15	Spain
16	Slovenia
17	Japan
18	Argentina
19	Kazakhstan
20	China
21	Paraguay
22	Chile
23	DR Congo
24	Uzbekistan

Team qualified for the 2018 Women's Junior World Handball Championship

2016 Women's Youth World Champions

Russia
First title

Team roster: Alexandra Davidenko, Kristina Alirzaeva, Svetlana Ivanova, Ekaterina Zelenkova, Ekaterina Kudriavtseva, Karina Sabirova, Margarita Orlova, Milana Tazhenova, Svetlana Kremneva, Mariia Duvakina, Serafima Tikhanova, Sofiia Sinitsyna, Antonina Skorobogatchenko, Mariia Dudina, Anastasia Illarionova, Sofia Ignatovich.
Head coach: Viacheslav Kirilenko.

== Awards ==
- MVP : (Russia) Karina Sabirova
- Top Goalscorer : (Hungary) Bernadett Hornyák (78 goals)
- Best defender : (Norway) Guro Nestaker

=== All-Star Team ===
- Goalkeeper : (Denmark) Lærke Sørensen
- Right wing : (Russia) Mariia Dudina
- Right back : (Russia) Antonina Skorobogatchenko
- Centre back : (South Korea) Gim A-yeong
- Left back : (South Korea) Song Jin-mi
- Left wing : (Denmark) Emma Friis
- Pivot : (Denmark) Ida-Marie Dahl
