= Ida-Marie Dahl =

Danish handball player (born 1998)

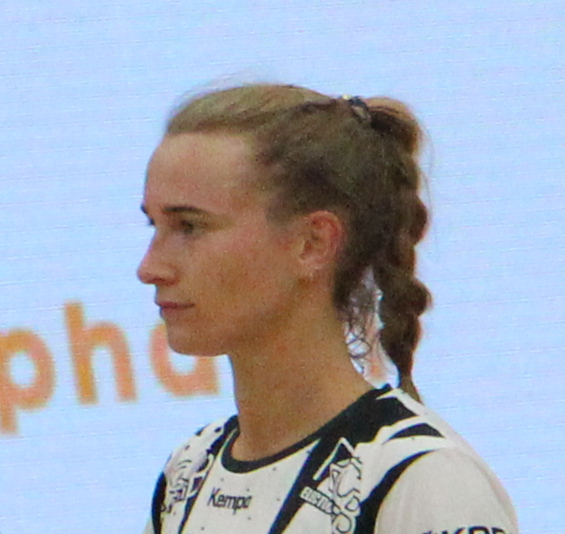

Personal information
- Full name: Ida-Marie Moesgaard Dahl
- Nationality: Danish
- Born: 19 March 1998 (age 28) Hvidovre, Denmark
- Height: 1.74 m (5 ft 9 in)

Sport
- Sport: Handball
- Position: Line player
- Current club: JDA Dijon Handball
- Number: 24

Senior clubs
- Years: Team
- 2015–2018: Ajax København
- 2018–2023: Viborg HK
- 2023–2024: CS Gloria Bistrița-Năsăud
- 2024–2026: SønderjyskE Damehåndbold
- 2026: Győri ETO KC
- 2026–: JDA Dijon Handball
National team
Years	Team	Apps	(Gls)
2018–	Denmark	14	(14)
Medal record
Youth World Championship
Silver medal – second place	2016 Slovakia
Youth European Championship
Gold medal – first place	2015 Macedonia
Junior European Championship
Silver medal – second place	2017 Slovenia
- Updated on 12 April 2026

Ida-Marie Moesgaard Dahl (born 19 March 1998) is a Danish handball player who plays as a pivot for French club JDA Dijon Handball and the Danish national team.

== Career ==
She started her senior career at Ajax København, before moving to Viborg HK in 2018. In 2023 she joined Romanian CS Gloria Bistrița-Năsăud for a single season. In 2024 she returned to Denmark to join SønderjyskE.

In February 2026 she joined Hungarian team Györ.

She made her debut on the Danish national team on 28 September 2018, against Norway.

She also represented Denmark in the 2015 European Women's U-17 Handball Championship in Macedonia, leading to the trophy.

== Achievements ==
- Youth World Championship:
  - Silver Medalist: 2016
- European Youth Championship:
  - Winner: 2015
- Junior European Championship:
  - Silver Medalist: 2017
