= Sarah Stougaard =

Danish handball player (born 1998)

Personal information
- Full name: Sarah Grunnet Stougaard
- Nationality: Danish
- Born: 17 March 1998 (age 28)
- Height: 1.69 m (5 ft 7 in)

Sport
- Sport: Handball
- Position: Left wing
- Current club: Skanderborg Håndbold
- Number: 22

Senior clubs
- Years: Team
- 2015-2017: Skanderborg Håndbold
- 2017-2019: Holstebro Håndbold
- 2019-2021: Skanderborg Håndbold
- 2021-: Hadsten Håndbold
Medal record
Youth World Championship
| Silver medal – second place | 2016 Slovakia |
U-17 European Championship
| Gold medal – first place | 2015 Macedonia |
U-19 European Championship
| Silver medal – second place | 2017 Slovenia |

Sarah Grunnet Stougaard (born 17 March 1998) is a Danish handball player who currently plays for Hadsten Håndbold in the Danish Women's 1st division (second tier).

She also represented Denmark in the 2015 European Women's U-17 Handball Championship in Macedonia, leading to the trophy.

== Achievements ==
- Youth World Championship:
  - Silver Medalist: 2016
- European Youth Championship:
  - Winner: 2015
- Junior European Championship:
  - Silver Medalist: 2017
