= Emma Friis =

Danish handball player (born 1999)

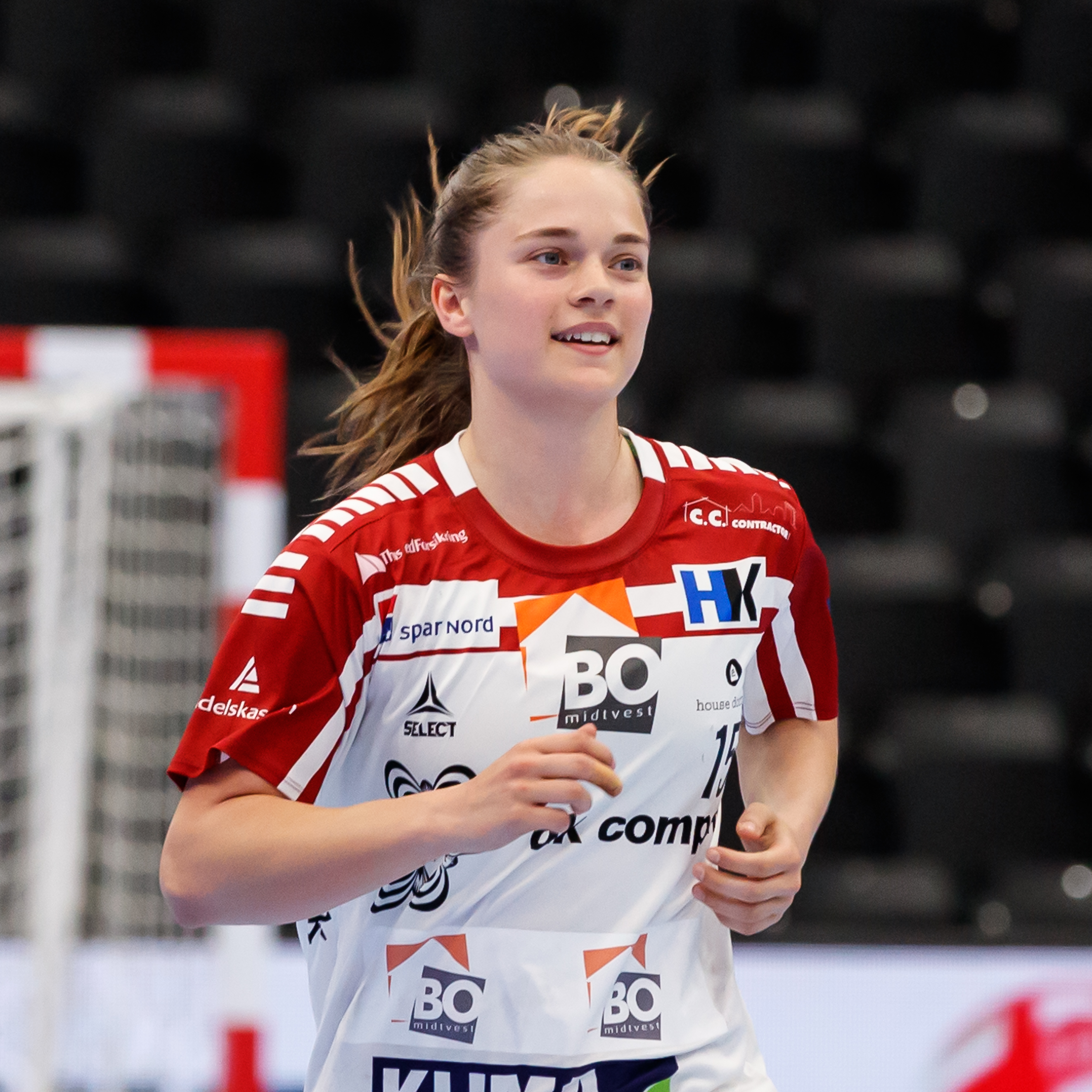
- Friis in 2023

Personal information
- Full name: Emma Cecilie Uhrskov Friis
- Nationality: Danish
- Born: 31 October 1999 (age 26) Herning, Denmark
- Height: 1.60 m (5 ft 3 in)

Sport
- Sport: Handball
- Position: Left wing
- Current club: CSM București
- Number: 15

Senior clubs
- Years: Team
- 2016–2024: Ikast Håndbold
- 2024–: CSM București
National team
| Years | Team | Apps | (Gls) |
| 2018– | Denmark | 96 | (274) |
Medal record
Olympic Games
| Bronze medal – third place | 2024 Paris | Team |
World Championship
| Bronze medal – third place | 2021 Spain |
| Bronze medal – third place | 2023 Denmark/Norway/Sweden |
European Championship
| Silver medal – second place | 2022 Slovenia/North Macedonia/Montenegro |
| Silver medal – second place | 2024 Austria/Hungary/Switzerland |
IHF Youth World Championship
| Silver medal – second place | 2016 Slovakia |
European Youth Olympic Festival
| Silver medal – second place | 2015 Tbilisi |
- Updated on 12 April 2026

Emma Cecilie Uhrskov Friis (born 31 October 1999) is a Danish handball player for CSM București and the Danish national team.

In September 2018, she was included by EHF in a list of the twenty best young handballers to watch for the future.

== Career ==
Friis started playing Handball at Herning FH, before joining SINE SønderjyskE. In 2016 she joined FC Midjylland Håndbold's youth team. She made her senior debut for the team in 2016 in the Danish Cup semifinal against Viborg HK. She continued in the club after the name change to Herning-Ikast Håndbold until 2022. With the club she won the Danish Cup in 2019. She joined Ikast Håndbold in 2022, where she won the EHF European League betting fellow Danish team Nykøbing Falster Håndboldklub in the final, where she was the top scorer of the final with 11 goals.

In the summer of 2024 she joined Romanian side CSM Bucharest.

=== National team ===
She made her debut on the Danish national team on 29 September 2018, against Norway.

She represented Denmark at the 2021 World Women's Handball Championship in Spain and at the 2023 World Women's Handball Championship at home, where Denmark won bronze medals on both occasions. At the 2022 European Championship she won silver medals. At the 2024 Olympics she won a bronze medal. Later the same year, she won silver medals at the 2024 European Championship, losing to Norway in the final.

At the 2025 World Women's Handball Championship Denmark went out in the quarterfinal to France after winning all matches in the group stages. The Danish team was affected by a lot of players missing the tournament including goalkeepers Sandra Toft and Althea Reinhardt and pivots Sarah Iversen and Rikke Iversen. This was the first time since 2019 that Denmark left a major international tournament without any medals.

== Individual awards ==
- All-Star left wing of the Summer Olympics: 2024
- MVP at the 2022–23 EHF European League Final Four
- All-Star Left Wing of the European Championship: 2022, 2024
- All-Star Left Wing of the IHF Junior World Championship: 2018
- All-Star Left Wing of the IHF Youth World Championship: 2016
- Youth player of the Year in Damehåndboldligaen: 2018/19
- EHF Excellence Awards Best left wing of the season: 2022/23
