= Andreea Tecar =

Romanian handball player (born 1998)

Personal information
- Nationality: Romanian
- Born: 21 March 1998 (age 28) Baia Mare, Romania
- Height: 1.79 m (5 ft 10 in)

Sport
- Sport: Handball
- Position: Right back
- Current club: Minaur Baia Mare
- Number: 20

Senior clubs
- Years: Team
- 2016–2019: Minaur Baia Mare
- 2019–2020: HC Zalău
- 2020-: Minaur Baia Mare
- Updated on 27 September 2019

Andreea Tecar (born 21 March 1998) is a Romanian female handball player for HC Zalău.

As a junior, she finished fourth in the 2015 European Youth Championship.
