= Antonina Skorobogatchenko =

Russian handball player (born 1999)

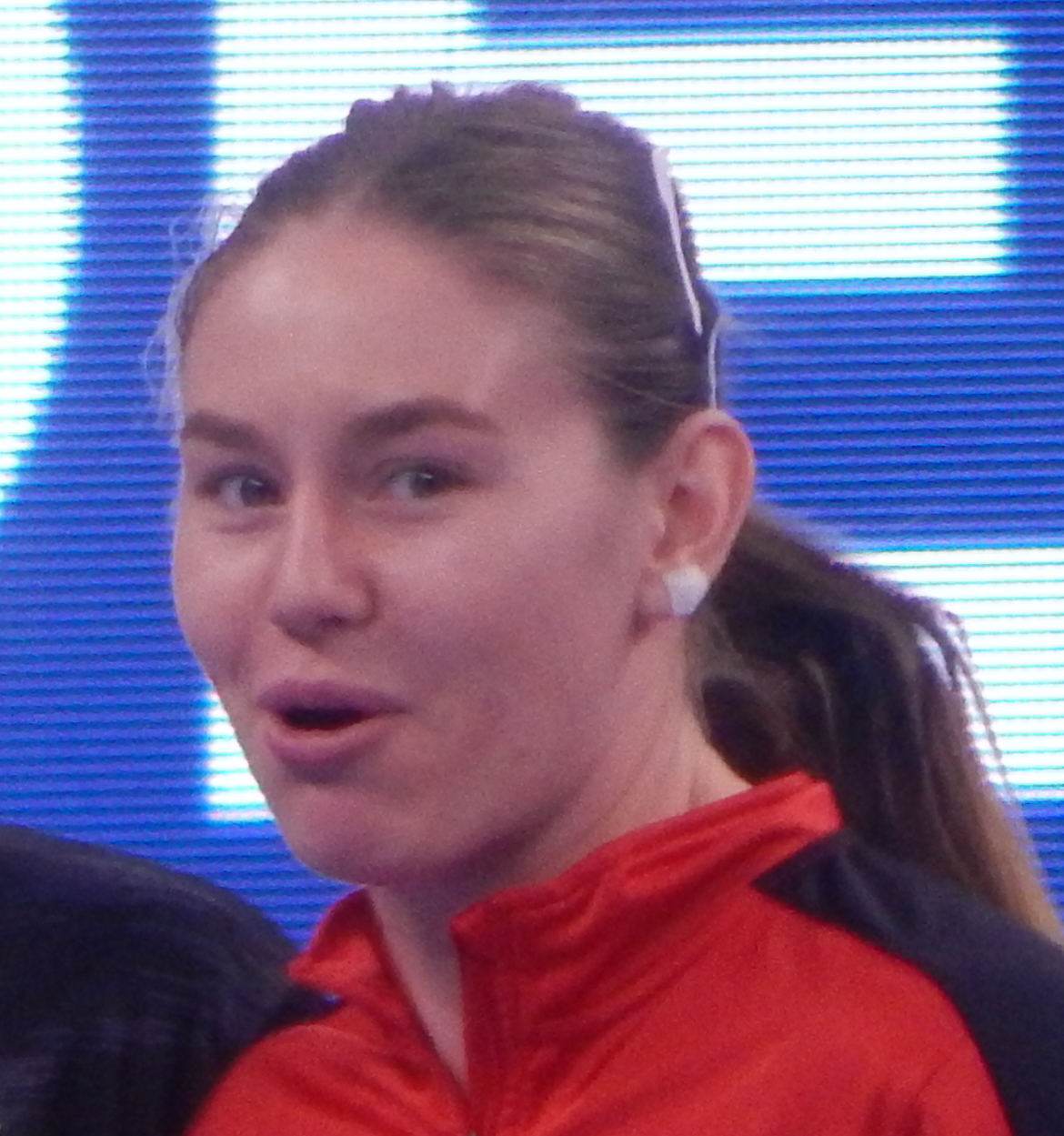
- Skorobogatchenko in 2021

Personal information
- Full name: Antonina Vitalyevna; Skorobogatchenko
- Nationality: Russian
- Born: 14 February 1999 (age 27) Volgograd, Russia
- Height: 1.82 m (6 ft 0 in)

Sport
- Sport: Handball
- Position: Right back
- Current club: HBC CSKA Moscow
- Number: 39

Senior clubs
- Years: Team
- 2015–2017: Dinamo Volgograd
- 2017–2020: HC Kuban Krasnodar
- 2020–: HBC CSKA Moscow
National team
| Years | Team | Apps | (Gls) |
| 2016– | Russia | 42 | (101) |
Medal record
Representing ROC
Olympic Games
| Silver medal – second place | 2020 Tokyo | Team |
Representing Russia
European Championship
| Silver medal – second place | 2018 France | Team |
World Junior Championship
| Silver medal – second place | 2016 Russia | Team |
World Youth Championship
| Gold medal – first place | 2016 Slovakia | Team |
European Youth Championship
| Silver medal – second place | 2015 Macedonia | Team |

Antonina Vitalyevna Santalova (Russian: Антонина Витальевна Санталова, IPA: [ɐntɐˈnʲinə skərəbɐˈɡatɕːɪnkə]; née Skorobogatchenko 14 February 1999) is a Russian handballer for HBC CSKA Moscow and the Russian national team. At the 2020 Olympics she won a silver medal with Russia, losing to France in the final.

In the summer of 2017, Skorobogatchenko tested positive for meldonium at the European Junior Championship. Maria Duvakina and Maria Dudina also tested positive at the same time. Russia later had their silver medals taken away following the doping test.

== Career ==
Skorobogatchenko started her career at her hometown club Dinamo Volgograd. In February 2017 she joined HC Kuban Krasnodar. In February 2020 she joined HBC CSKA Moscow. Here she won the 2021 and 2023 Russian Championship and the 2022 and 2023 Russian Cup.

In May 2023 she took a break from handball due to pregnancy. In 2025 she won another Russian Championship.

== Individual awards ==
- All-Star Right Back of the EHF U-17 European Championship: 2015
- All-Star Right Back of the IHF Junior World Championship: 2016
- All-Star Right Back of the IHF Youth World Championship: 2016
