= Mariia Dudina =

Russian handballer

Personal information
- Full name: Mariia Dudina
- Nationality: Russian
- Born: 22 October 1998 (age 27) Saint Petersburg, Russia
- Height: 1.82 m (6 ft 0 in)

Sport
- Sport: Handball
- Position: Right wing
- Current club: HC Kuban Krasnodar
- Number: 74

Senior clubs
- Years: Team
- 2015–2019: Zvezda Zvenigorod
- 2019–: HC Kuban Krasnodar
Medal record
IHF Youth World Championship
Gold medal – first place	2016 Slovakia
EHF U-17 European Championship
Silver medal – second place	2015 Macedonia

Mariia Dudina (born 22 October 1998) is a Russian handballer for HC Kuban Krasnodar.

In the summer of 2017, Dudina tested positive for meldonium at the 2017 European Junior Championship. Maria Duvakina and Antonina Skorobogatchenko also tested positive at the same time. Russia later had their silver medals taken away following the doping test.

== Individual awards ==
- All-Star Right Wing of the EHF U-17 European Championship: 2015
- All-Star Right Wing of the IHF Youth World Championship: 2016
