= Lærke Sørensen =

Danish handball player (born 1998)

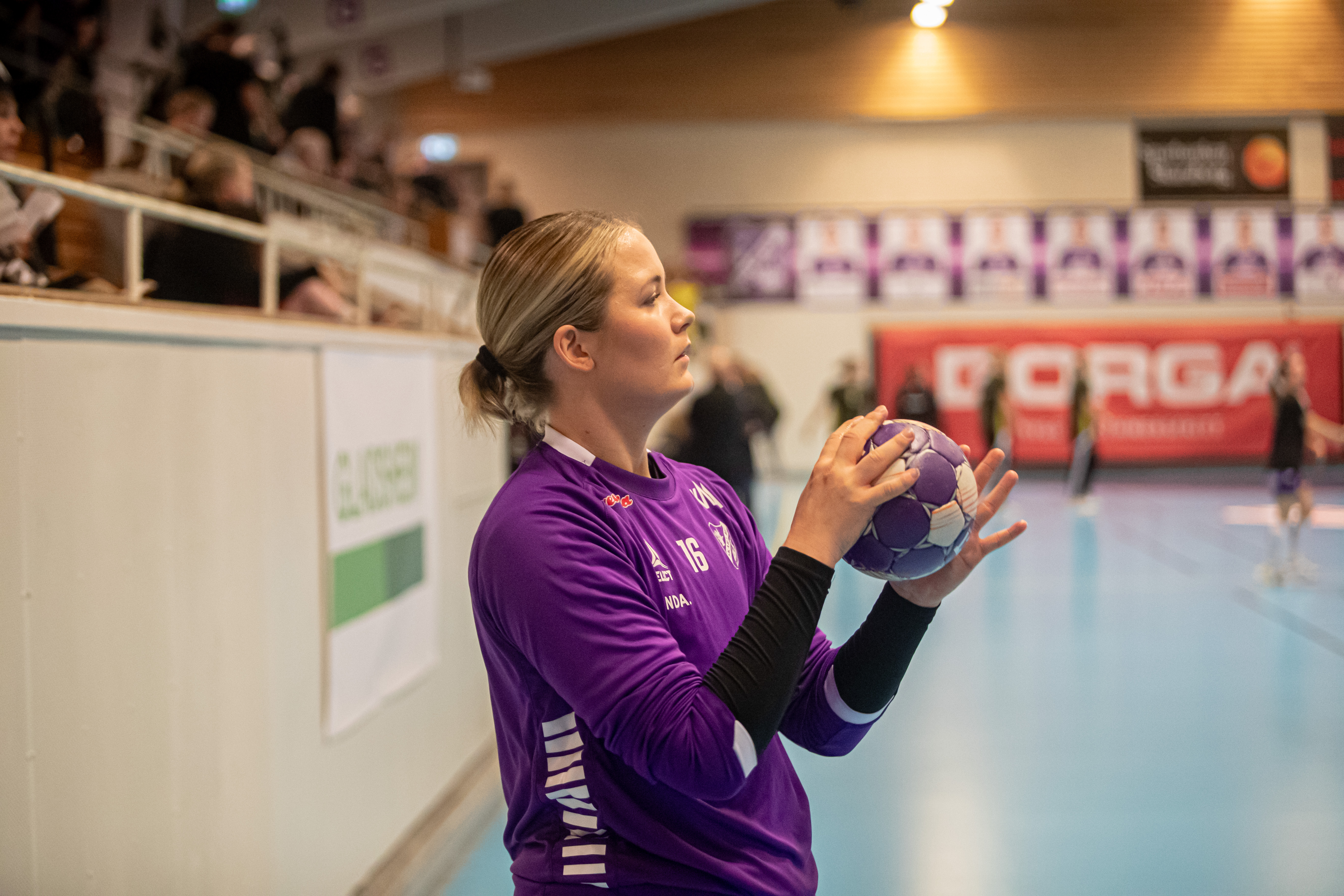

Personal information
- Full name: Lærke Sofie Tandrup Sørensen
- Nationality: Danish
- Born: 6 February 1998 (age 28) Favrskov Municipality, Denmark
- Height: 1.77 m (5 ft 10 in)

Sport
- Sport: Handball
- Position: Goalkeeper
- Current club: Skövde HF
- Number: 16

Senior clubs
- Years: Team
- 2014-2015: Randers HK
- 2015-2017: SK Aarhus
- 2017-2018: Molde Elite
- 2018-2019: Horsens HK
- 2019-2026: Skara HF
- 2026–: Skövde HF
National team
Years	Team	Apps	(Gls)
2016-2017	Denmark Junior	22	(0)
Medal record
EHF U-19 European Championship
Bronze medal – third place	2017 Slovenia
IHF Youth World Championship
Silver medal – second place	2016 Slovakia
EHF U-17 European Championship
Gold medal – first place	2015 Macedonia

Lærke Sørensen (born 6 February 1998) is a Danish handballer for Swedish club Skövde HF.

She also represented Denmark in the 2015 European Women's U-17 Handball Championship in Macedonia, leading to the trophy.

With Skara she won the Swedish Championship in 2025, which was the first in club history.

== Achievements ==
- Youth World Championship:
  - Silver Medalist: 2016
- European Youth Championship:
  - Winner: 2015
- Junior European Championship:
  - Silver Medalist: 2017

== Individual awards ==
- All-Star Goalkeeper of the EHF U-17 European Championship: 2015
- All-Star Goalkeeper of the IHF Youth World Championship: 2016
