= Noémi Pásztor =

Hungarian handball player (born 1999)

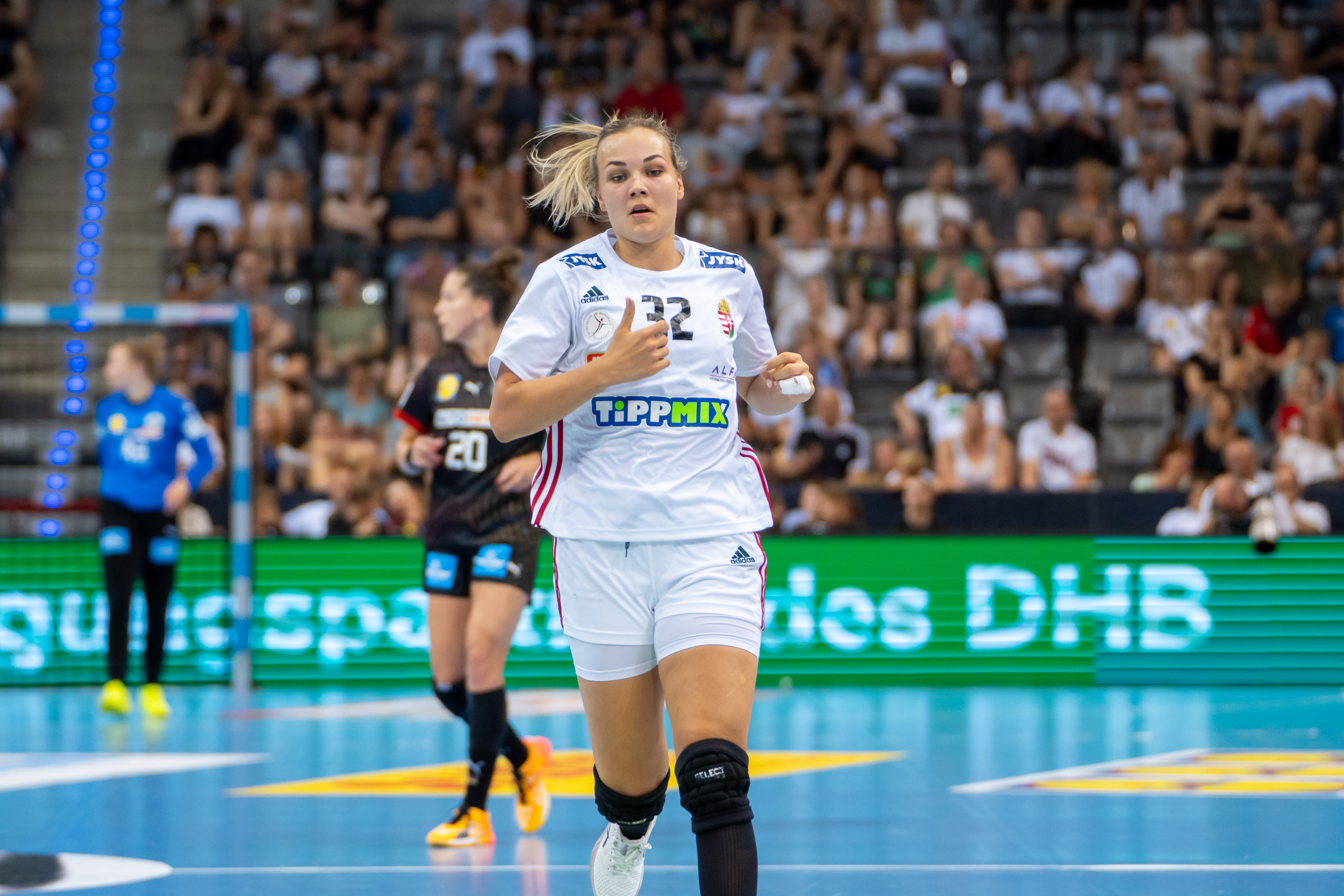

Personal information
- Nationality: Hungarian
- Born: 2 April 1999 (age 27) Szombathely, Hungary
- Height: 1.78 m (5 ft 10 in)

Sport
- Sport: Handball
- Position: Pivot
- Current club: CSM București
- Number: 32

Youth career
- Years: Team
- –2017: NEKA

Senior clubs
- Years: Team
- 2017–2019: Budaörs Handball
- 2019–2021: Ferencvárosi TC
- 2021–2024: Mosonmagyaróvári KC SE
- 2024–2025: CSM București
- 2025–: Szombathelyi KKA
National team
Years	Team	Apps	(Gls)
2019–	Hungary	53	(39)
Medal record
European Championship
Bronze medal – third place	2024 Austria/Hungary/Switzerland
Junior World Championship
Gold medal – first place	2018 Hungary
Youth European Championship
Bronze medal – third place	2015 Macedonia
- Updated on 16 November 2025

Noémi Pásztor (born 2 April 1999) is a Hungarian handballer for CSM București and the Hungarian national team.

She made her international debut on 5 June 2019 against Austria. At the 2024 European Championship she was part of the Hungarian team that won bronze medals, losing to Norway in semifinal and beating France in the third place play-off. This was the first Hungarian medals since 2012.

== Achievements ==
- Junior World Championship:
  - Gold Medalist: 2018
- Youth European Championship:
  - Bronze Medalist: 2015

== Awards and recognition ==
- All-Star Pivot of the Youth European Championship: 2015
- All-Star Pivot of the Junior World Championship: 2018

== Personal life ==
In 2021 she graduated from the Semmelweis University and earned a degree in dietetics.
