= Elisabet Cesáreo =

Spanish handball player (born 1999)

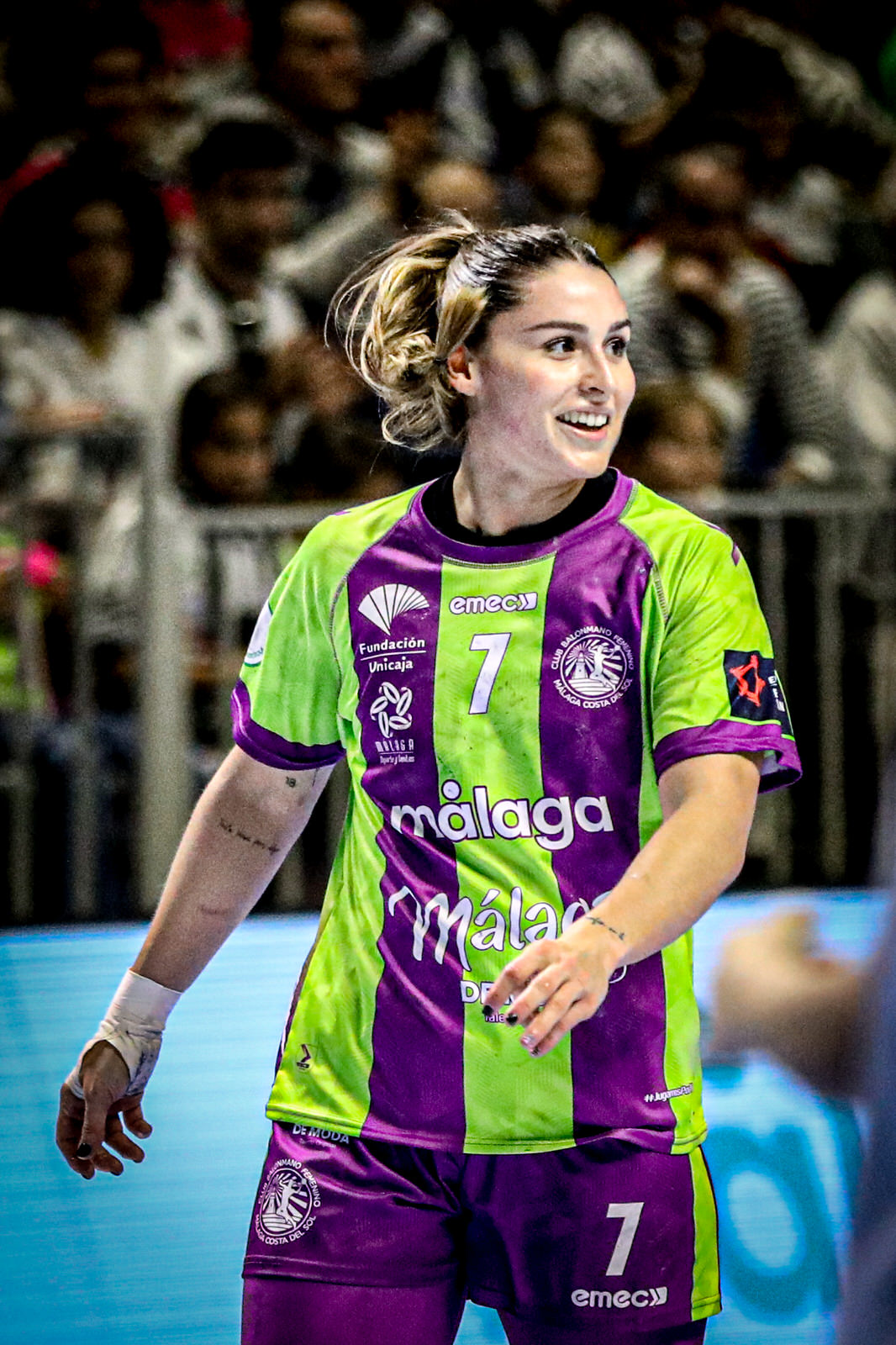

Personal information
- Full name: Elisabet Cesáreo Romero
- Nationality: Spanish
- Born: 25 May 1999 (age 27) Sant Joan Despí, Spain
- Height: 1.77 m (5 ft 10 in)

Sport
- Sport: Handball
- Position: Pivot
- Current club: CBF Málaga Costa del Sol
- Number: 7

Youth career
- Years: Team
- 2016-2017: Handbol Sant Vicenç

Senior clubs
- Years: Team
- 2017–2019: BM Aula Valladolid
- 2019–2020: BM Bera Bera
- 2020–2023: JDA Dijon Bourgogne Handball
- 2023–2025: CBF Málaga Costa del Sol
National team
Years	Team	Apps	(Gls)
2018–	Spain	71	(73)
Medal record
World Championship
Silver medal – second place	2019 Japan
- Updated on 5 December 2024

Elisabet Cesáreo Romero (born 25 May 1999) is a Spanish handball player for Spanish club CBF Málaga Costa del Sol and the Spanish national team.

In September 2018, she made her senior Spain squad debut for two friendly matches. Two months later, she participated in her first major international competition, the 2018 European Women's Handball Championship.

She represented Spain at the 2019 World Women's Handball Championship during which Spain won the silver medal.

== Achievements ==
=== Club ===
- Spanish league (Liga Guerreras Iberdrola / División de Honor):
  - Winner: 2020, 2021, 2022 (with BM Bera Bera)

=== International ===
- Olympic Games
  - 2020: 9th
- World Championship
  - 2019: (silver) Silver
  - 2021: 4th
- European Championship
  - 2018: 12th
