= Anika Strnad =

Slovenian handball player

Personal information
- Nationality: Slovenian
- Born: 11 June 1998 (age 28)
- Height: 1.73 m (5 ft 8 in)

Sport
- Sport: Handball
- Position: Right back
- Current club: RK Žalec
National team
Years	Team	Apps	(Gls)
2019–	Slovenia	9	(6)

Anika Strnad (born 11 June 1998) is a Slovenian handball player for RK Žalec and the Slovenian national team.

She represented Slovenia at the 2019 World Women's Handball Championship.
