= 2015 European Women's U-17 Handball Championship =

2015 European U-17 Handball Championship
Tournament details
- Host country: North Macedonia
- Venues: 2 (in 2 host cities)
- Dates: August 13 2015–August 23 2015
- Teams: 16 (from 1 confederation)

Final positions
- Champions: Denmark
- Runners-up: Russia
- Third place: Hungary
- Fourth place: Romania

Tournament statistics
- Top scorer(s): Sorina Tîrcă (ROU)

Awards
- Best player: Helena Elver (DEN)

The 2015 European Women's U-17 Handball Championship is the 12th edition, which took place in North Macedonia. Sweden was the defending champion but Denmark won.

== Qualified teams ==
- Croatia
- Czech Republic
- Denmark
- Spain
- France
- Germany
- Hungary
- North Macedonia
- Netherlands
- Norway
- Portugal
- Romania
- Russia
- Slovenia
- Slovakia
- Sweden

== Preliminary round ==
Team advanced to the main round

=== Group A ===
Pos	Team	Pld	W	D	L	GF	GA	GD	Pts
1	Sweden	3	2	1	0	96	74	+22	5
2	Slovenia	3	2	1	0	99	82	+17	5
3	Czech Republic	3	1	0	2	101	97	+4	2
4	North Macedonia	3	0	0	3	59	102	−43	0

Rules for classification: 1) points; 2) head-to-head points; 3) head-to-head goal difference; 4) head-to-head number of goals scored; 5) Goal difference.

13 August 2015; 17:00	Slovenia	39–33	Czech Republic	Attendance: 350; Referees: Marina Duplii (UKR)
13 August 2015; 17:00		(21–20)		Attendance: 350; Referees: Marina Duplii (UKR)

13 August 2015; 19:00	Sweden	32–16	North Macedonia	Attendance: 500; Referees: Denis Bolic (AUT)
13 August 2015; 19:00		(14–11)		Attendance: 500; Referees: Denis Bolic (AUT)

14 August 2015; 17:00	Czech Republic	29–35	Sweden	Attendance: 400; Referees: Jakub Jerlecki (POL)
14 August 2015; 17:00		(16–21)		Attendance: 400; Referees: Jakub Jerlecki (POL)

14 August 2015; 19:00	North Macedonia	20–31	Slovenia	Attendance: 950; Referees: Francesco Simone (ITA)
14 August 2015; 19:00		(9–17)		Attendance: 950; Referees: Francesco Simone (ITA)

16 August 2015; 17:00	Sweden	29–29	Slovenia	Attendance: 450; Referees: Marta Sa (POR)
16 August 2015; 17:00		(20–13)		Attendance: 450; Referees: Marta Sa (POR)

16 August 2015; 19:00	North Macedonia	23–39	Czech Republic	Attendance: 200; Referees: Georgi Doychinov (BUL)
16 August 2015; 19:00		(12–21)		Attendance: 200; Referees: Georgi Doychinov (BUL)

=== Group B ===
Pos	Team	Pld	W	D	L	GF	GA	GD	Pts
1	Russia	3	3	0	0	89	69	+20	6
2	Romania	3	1	0	2	83	79	+4	2
3	Germany	3	1	0	2	76	82	−6	2
4	Spain	3	1	0	2	71	89	−18	2

Rules for classification: 1) points; 2) head-to-head points; 3) head-to-head goal difference; 4) head-to-head number of goals scored; 5) Goal difference.

13 August 2015; 13:00	Russia	26–20	Germany	Attendance: 200; Referees: Jakub Jerlecki (POL)
13 August 2015; 13:00		(13–12)		Attendance: 200; Referees: Jakub Jerlecki (POL)

13 August 2015; 15:00	Romania	29–20	Spain	Attendance: 200; Referees: Georgi Doychinov (BUL)
13 August 2015; 15:00		(10–8)		Attendance: 200; Referees: Georgi Doychinov (BUL)

14 August 2015; 13:00	Spain	22–34	Russia	Attendance: 200; Referees: Marta Sa (POR)
14 August 2015; 13:00		(10–11)		Attendance: 200; Referees: Marta Sa (POR)

14 August 2015; 15:00	Germany	30–27	Romania	Attendance: 250; Referees: Marina Duplii (UKR)
14 August 2015; 15:00		(16–10)		Attendance: 250; Referees: Marina Duplii (UKR)

16 August 2015; 13:00	Russia	29–27	Romania	Attendance: 200; Referees: Francesco Simone (ITA)
16 August 2015; 13:00		(16–11)		Attendance: 200; Referees: Francesco Simone (ITA)

16 August 2015; 15:00	Germany	26–29	Spain	Attendance: 300; Referees: Denis Bolic (AUT)
16 August 2015; 15:00		(14–13)		Attendance: 300; Referees: Denis Bolic (AUT)

=== Group C ===
Pos	Team	Pld	W	D	L	GF	GA	GD	Pts
1	Croatia	3	3	0	0	83	75	+8	6
2	France	3	2	0	1	86	84	+2	4
3	Netherlands	3	1	0	2	83	79	+4	2
4	Portugal	3	0	0	3	71	95	−24	0

Rules for classification: 1) points; 2) head-to-head points; 3) head-to-head goal difference; 4) head-to-head number of goals scored; 5) Goal difference.

13 August 2015; 13:00	Portugal	24–35	France	Attendance: 50; Referees: Alain Rauchs (LUX)
13 August 2015; 13:00		(13–19)		Attendance: 50; Referees: Alain Rauchs (LUX)

13 August 2015; 15:00	Croatia	24–22	Netherlands	Attendance: 100; Referees: Cristina Nastase (ROU)
13 August 2015; 15:00		(12–11)		Attendance: 100; Referees: Cristina Nastase (ROU)

14 August 2015; 13:00	Netherlands	32–20	Portugal	Attendance: 50; Referees: Maria Bennani (SWE)
14 August 2015; 13:00		(13–10)		Attendance: 50; Referees: Maria Bennani (SWE)

14 August 2015; 15:00	France	26–31	Croatia	Attendance: 100; Referees: Saso Krkacev (MKD)
14 August 2015; 15:00		(14–15)		Attendance: 100; Referees: Saso Krkacev (MKD)

16 August 2015; 13:00	Portugal	27–28	Croatia	Attendance: 200; Referees: Jakub Jerlecki (POL)
16 August 2015; 13:00		(13–13)		Attendance: 200; Referees: Jakub Jerlecki (POL)

16 August 2015; 15:00	France	35–29	Netherlands	Attendance: 150; Referees: Cristina Nastase (ROU)
16 August 2015; 15:00		(16–15)		Attendance: 150; Referees: Cristina Nastase (ROU)

=== Group D ===
Pos	Team	Pld	W	D	L	GF	GA	GD	Pts
1	Denmark	3	3	0	0	101	61	+40	6
2	Hungary	3	2	0	1	101	88	+13	4
3	Norway	3	1	0	2	81	104	−23	2
4	Slovakia	3	0	0	3	67	97	−30	0

Rules for classification: 1) points; 2) head-to-head points; 3) head-to-head goal difference; 4) head-to-head number of goals scored; 5) Goal difference.

13 August 2015; 17:00	Denmark	33–30	Hungary	Attendance: 100; Referees: Saso Krkacev (MKD)
13 August 2015; 17:00		(17–17)		Attendance: 100; Referees: Saso Krkacev (MKD)

13 August 2015; 19:00	Norway	35–27	Slovakia	Attendance: 50; Referees: Francesco Simone (ITA)
13 August 2015; 19:00		(15–13)		Attendance: 50; Referees: Francesco Simone (ITA)

14 August 2015; 17:00	Slovakia	14–31	Denmark	Attendance: 168; Referees: Alain Rauchs (LUX)
14 August 2015; 17:00		(6–18)		Attendance: 168; Referees: Alain Rauchs (LUX)

14 August 2015; 19:00	Hungary	40–29	Norway	Attendance: 100; Referees: Cristina Nastase (ROU)
14 August 2015; 19:00		(21–14)		Attendance: 100; Referees: Cristina Nastase (ROU)

16 August 2015; 17:00	Denmark	37–17	Norway	Attendance: 500; Referees: Maria Bennani (SWE)
16 August 2015; 17:00		(18–7)		Attendance: 500; Referees: Maria Bennani (SWE)

16 August 2015; 19:00	Hungary	31–26	Slovakia	Attendance: 100; Referees: Marina Duplii (UKR)
16 August 2015; 19:00		(16–14)		Attendance: 100; Referees: Marina Duplii (UKR)

== Main round ==
=== Group M1 ===
Pos	Team	Pld	W	D	L	GF	GA	GD	Pts
1	Russia	3	3	0	0	103	73	+30	6
2	Romania	3	2	0	1	89	75	+14	4
3	Slovenia	3	0	1	2	81	103	−22	1
4	Sweden	3	0	1	2	69	91	−22	1

Rules for classification: 1) points; 2) head-to-head points; 3) head-to-head goal difference; 4) head-to-head number of goals scored; 5) Goal difference.

18 August 2015; 17:00	Slovenia	25–34	Romania	Attendance: 300; Referees: Jakub Jerlecki (POL)
18 August 2015; 17:00		(17–18)		Attendance: 300; Referees: Jakub Jerlecki (POL)

18 August 2015; 19:00	Sweden	19–34	Russia	Attendance: 300; Referees: Saso Krkacev (MKD)
18 August 2015; 19:00		(10–15)		Attendance: 300; Referees: Saso Krkacev (MKD)

19 August 2015; 17:00	Romania	28–21	Sweden	Attendance: 300; Referees: Francesco Simone (ITA)
19 August 2015; 17:00		(11–11)		Attendance: 300; Referees: Francesco Simone (ITA)

19 August 2015; 19:00	Russia	40–27	Slovenia	Attendance: 100; Referees: Denis Bolic (AUT)
19 August 2015; 19:00		(20–13)		Attendance: 100; Referees: Denis Bolic (AUT)

=== Group M2 ===
Pos	Team	Pld	W	D	L	GF	GA	GD	Pts
1	Denmark	3	2	0	1	86	82	+4	4
2	Hungary	3	2	0	1	90	86	+4	4
3	Croatia	3	1	0	2	90	91	−1	2
4	France	3	1	0	2	72	79	−7	2

Rules for classification: 1) points; 2) head-to-head points; 3) head-to-head goal difference; 4) head-to-head number of goals scored; 5) Goal difference.

18 August 2015; 17:00	France	24–28	Hungary	Attendance: 58; Referees: Maria Bennani (SWE)
18 August 2015; 17:00		(10–15)		Attendance: 58; Referees: Maria Bennani (SWE)

18 August 2015; 19:00	Croatia	30–33	Denmark	Attendance: 100; Referees: Denis Bolic (AUT)
18 August 2015; 19:00		(15–18)		Attendance: 100; Referees: Denis Bolic (AUT)

19 August 2015; 17:00	Hungary	32–29	Croatia	Attendance: 100; Referees: Saso Krkacev (MKD)
19 August 2015; 17:00		(16–17)		Attendance: 100; Referees: Saso Krkacev (MKD)

19 August 2015; 19:00	Denmark	20–22	France	Attendance: 68; Referees: Marta Sa (POR)
19 August 2015; 19:00		(13–12)		Attendance: 68; Referees: Marta Sa (POR)

== Knockout stage ==
Semi-finals
21 August
Russia	33
Hungary	24
21 August
Denmark	31
Romania	23

Final
23 August
Russia	24
Denmark	25
Third place
23 August
Hungary	34
Romania	31

=== Semifinals ===
21 August 2015; 18:00	Russia	33–24	Hungary	Attendance: 500; Referees: Jakub Jerlecki (POL)
21 August 2015; 18:00		(17–11)		Attendance: 500; Referees: Jakub Jerlecki (POL)

21 August 2015; 20:30	Denmark	19–14	Romania	Attendance: 500; Referees: Denis Bolic (AUT)
21 August 2015; 20:30		(14–10)		Attendance: 500; Referees: Denis Bolic (AUT)

=== Third place game ===
23 August 2015; 15:00	Hungary	34–31	Romania	Attendance: 800; Referees: Saso Krkacev (MKD)
23 August 2015; 15:00		(17–19)		Attendance: 800; Referees: Saso Krkacev (MKD)

=== Final ===
23 August 2015; 17:30	Russia	24–25	Denmark	Attendance: 1800; Referees: Cristina Nastase (ROU)
23 August 2015; 17:30		(10–14)		Attendance: 1800; Referees: Cristina Nastase (ROU)

== Rankings and awardees ==
=== Final standings ===
Rank	Team
Gold medal	Denmark
Silver medal	Russia
Bronze medal	Hungary
4	Romania
5	Slovenia
6	Croatia
7	France
8	Sweden
9	Germany
10	Spain
11	Norway
12	Netherlands
13	Portugal
14	Slovakia
15	Czech Republic
16	North Macedonia

2015 Women's Youth Handball European Champions

'Denmark

=== All Star Team ===
- Goalkeeper: Lærke Sørensen (DEN)
- Left Wing: Sarah Stougaard (DEN)
- Left Back: Karina Sabirova (RUS)
- Playmaker: Matea Pletikosić (CRO)
- Pivot: Noémi Pásztor (HUN)
- Right Back: Antonina Skorobogatchenko (RUS)
- Right Wing: Maria Dudina (RUS)

=== Other awards ===
- Top Scorer: Sorina Tîrcă (ROU)
- Best Defence Player: Kristina Jørgensen (DEN)
- Most Valuable Player: Helena Elver (DEN)

Source: Archived 2020-04-12 at the Wayback Machine
