= 2009 World Women's Handball Championship =

2009 edition of the World Women's Handball Championship

第19届世界女子手球锦标赛 (in Chinese)

Tournament details
- Host country: China
- Venues: 6 (in 6 host cities)
- Dates: 5–20 December
- Teams: 24 (from 5 confederations)

Final positions
- Champions: Russia (4th title)
- Runners-up: France
- Third place: Norway
- Fourth place: Spain

Tournament statistics
- Matches played: 110
- Goals scored: 5,968 (54.25 per match)
- Attendance: 103,188 (938 per match)
- Top scorer: (Austria) Katrin Engel (67 goals)

Awards
- Best player: (Russia) Lyudmila Postnova

The 2009 World Women's Handball Championship was the 19th edition, second to take place outside Europe, of the international championship tournament in women's team sport handball that is governed by the International Handball Federation (IHF). China hosted the event from 5–20 December 2009. Russia successfully contested France in the final, their fourth title.

== Venues ==
The competition took place in the Chinese province of Jiangsu. It was the second women's World Championship organized outside of Europe, the first was in South Korea 1990.

Six cities were on the short list to host the matches:

| Nanjing | Wuxi | Suzhou |
|---|---|---|
| Nanjing Olympic Sports Center Gymnasium | Wuxi Sports Center | Suzhou Sports Center |
| Capacity: 13,000 | Capacity: 7,155 | Capacity: 6,000 |
2009 World Women's Handball Championship is located in Jiangsu
| Changzhou | Yangzhou | Zhangjiagang |
| Changzhou Olympic Sports Center | Yangzhou Sports Garden | Zhangjiagang Sports Center |
| Capacity: 6,000 | Capacity: 5,500 | Capacity: 3,750 |

== Qualification ==
Host Nation

- China

Defending Champions

- Russia

Qualified from the 2008 Asian Championship

- South Korea
- Japan
- Thailand
- Kazakhstan

Qualified from the 2008 European Championship

- Norway
- Spain

Qualified from European play-offs

European play-offs were played from 6–7 June 2009 (first leg) and 12–14 June 2009 (second leg). Qualified teams are marked in bold.

| Team 1 | Agg. | Team 2 | 1st leg | 2nd leg |
|---|---|---|---|---|
| Slovakia | 43–55 | **Hungary** | 21–22 | 22–33 |
| **Sweden** | 52–45 | Montenegro | 24–17 | 28–28 |
| Serbia | 43–51 | **Germany** | 24–29 | 19–22 |
| Croatia | 51–55 | **France** | 27–23 | 24–32 |
| Belarus | 63–70 | **Romania** | 31–32 | 32–38 |
| Macedonia | 57–62 | **Austria** | 32–28 | 25–34 |
| Portugal | 43–79 | **Denmark** | 21–38 | 22–41 |
| **Ukraine** | 57–48 | Netherlands | 27–21 | 30–27 |

Qualified from the 2008 African Championship

- Angola
- Congo
- Ivory Coast
- Tunisia

Qualified from the 2009 Pan-American Championship

The 2009 Pan-American Championship took place from 23–27 June in Santiago, Chile. The three highest ranked teams qualified directly.

- Argentina
- Brazil
- Chile

Qualified from the 2009 Oceania Handball Nations Cup

The 2009 Oceania Championship took place in Brisbane, Australia, from 25–30 May. The host team won the competition and thus qualified directly.

- Australia

== Squads ==
Group A

- Brazil (squad)
- Congo (squad)
- Denmark (squad)
- France (squad)
- Germany (squad)
- Sweden (squad)

Group B

- Angola (squad)
- Australia (squad)
- Austria (squad)
- Russia (squad)
- Thailand (squad)
- Ukraine (squad)

Group C

- Chile (squad)
- Hungary (squad)
- Japan (squad)
- Norway (squad)
- Romania (squad)
- Tunisia (squad)

Group D

- Argentina (squad)
- China (squad)
- Ivory Coast (squad)
- Kazakhstan (squad)
- South Korea (squad)
- Spain (squad)

Each nation had to submit an initial squad of 28 players, 12 of them became reserves when the final squad of 16 players was announced on 5 December 2009.

== Preliminary round ==
The draw for the preliminary round was held on 15 July 2009 at the IHF headquarters in Basel, Switzerland. Teams placed first, second and third will qualify for the Main Round.

=== Group A ===
| Pos | Team | Pld | W | D | L | GF | GA | GD | Pts | Qualification |
|---|---|---|---|---|---|---|---|---|---|---|
| 1 | Denmark | 5 | 4 | 0 | 1 | 139 | 114 | +25 | 8 | Main round |
| 2 | France | 5 | 3 | 0 | 2 | 117 | 104 | +13 | 6 (Note: France 4 Pts; Germany 2 Pts; Sweden 0 Pts) | Main round |
| 3 | Germany | 5 | 3 | 0 | 2 | 142 | 136 | +6 | 6 | Main round |
| 4 | Sweden | 5 | 3 | 0 | 2 | 129 | 121 | +8 | 6 | |
| 5 | Brazil | 5 | 2 | 0 | 3 | 132 | 134 | −2 | 4 | |
| 6 | Congo | 5 | 0 | 0 | 5 | 116 | 166 | −50 | 0 | |

Rules for classification: 1) points; 2) head-to-head points; 3) head-to-head goal difference; 4) head-to-head number of goals scored; 5) goal difference.
Notes:

| 5 December 2009; 17:00 | France | 20–22 | Brazil | Wuxi Sports Center, Wuxi; Attendance: 150; Referees: Opava, Válek (CZE) |
| 5 December 2009; 17:00 | Dembélé 6 | (9–13) | Rodrigues 7 | Wuxi Sports Center, Wuxi; Attendance: 150; Referees: Opava, Válek (CZE) |
| 5 December 2009; 17:00 | 3× (yellow card) 1× (suspension) | Report | 4× (yellow card) 5× (suspension) | Wuxi Sports Center, Wuxi; Attendance: 150; Referees: Opava, Válek (CZE) |

| 5 December 2009; 19:00 | Sweden | 28–19 | Congo | Wuxi Sports Center, Wuxi; Attendance: 300; Referees: Raluy, Sabroso (ESP) |
| 5 December 2009; 19:00 | Flognman, Wikensten 5 | (9–9) | Itoua Atsono, Okoye Mbon 4 | Wuxi Sports Center, Wuxi; Attendance: 300; Referees: Raluy, Sabroso (ESP) |
| 5 December 2009; 19:00 | 3× (yellow card) 2× (suspension) | Report | 3× (yellow card) | Wuxi Sports Center, Wuxi; Attendance: 300; Referees: Raluy, Sabroso (ESP) |

| 5 December 2009; 21:00 | Germany | 26–27 | Denmark | Wuxi Sports Center, Wuxi; Attendance: 700; Referees: Horváth, Márton (HUN) |
| 5 December 2009; 21:00 | Mietzner 9 | (10–15) | Augustesen, L. Mortensen, Troelsen 6 | Wuxi Sports Center, Wuxi; Attendance: 700; Referees: Horváth, Márton (HUN) |
| 5 December 2009; 21:00 | 3× (yellow card) 4× (suspension) | Report | 3× (yellow card) 3× (suspension) | Wuxi Sports Center, Wuxi; Attendance: 700; Referees: Horváth, Márton (HUN) |

| 6 December 2009; 17:00 | Congo | 23–36 | Germany | Wuxi Sports Center, Wuxi; Attendance: 100; Referees: Florescu, Duţă (ROU) |
| 6 December 2009; 17:00 | Essopondo, Itoua Atsono, Okoye Mbon 4 | (10–15) | Neukamp 8 | Wuxi Sports Center, Wuxi; Attendance: 100; Referees: Florescu, Duţă (ROU) |
| 6 December 2009; 17:00 | 3× (yellow card) 6× (suspension) | Report | 3× (yellow card) 2× (suspension) | Wuxi Sports Center, Wuxi; Attendance: 100; Referees: Florescu, Duţă (ROU) |

| 6 December 2009; 19:00 | Brazil | 23–26 | Sweden | Wuxi Sports Center, Wuxi; Attendance: 350; Referees: Horváth, Márton (HUN) |
| 6 December 2009; 19:00 | Rodrigues 6 | (8–14) | Ahlm 5 | Wuxi Sports Center, Wuxi; Attendance: 350; Referees: Horváth, Márton (HUN) |
| 6 December 2009; 19:00 | 3× (yellow card) 4× (suspension) 1× (red card) | Report | 4× (yellow card) 7× (suspension) | Wuxi Sports Center, Wuxi; Attendance: 350; Referees: Horváth, Márton (HUN) |

| 6 December 2009; 21:00 | Denmark | 24–16 | France | Wuxi Sports Center, Wuxi; Attendance: 150; Referees: Raluy, Sabroso (ESP) |
| 6 December 2009; 21:00 | Dalby 8 | (11–8) | Pineau 4 | Wuxi Sports Center, Wuxi; Attendance: 150; Referees: Raluy, Sabroso (ESP) |
| 6 December 2009; 21:00 | 4× (yellow card) 5× (suspension) | Report | 2× (yellow card) 2× (suspension) | Wuxi Sports Center, Wuxi; Attendance: 150; Referees: Raluy, Sabroso (ESP) |

| 7 December 2009; 17:00 | Germany | 32–30 | Brazil | Wuxi Sports Center, Wuxi; Attendance: 250; Referees: Raluy, Sabroso (ESP) |
| 7 December 2009; 17:00 | Neukamp 8 | (19–12) | Pinheiro 10 | Wuxi Sports Center, Wuxi; Attendance: 250; Referees: Raluy, Sabroso (ESP) |
| 7 December 2009; 17:00 | 3× (yellow card) 4× (suspension) | Report | 3× (yellow card) 6× (suspension) | Wuxi Sports Center, Wuxi; Attendance: 250; Referees: Raluy, Sabroso (ESP) |

| 7 December 2009; 19:00 | Denmark | 37–24 | Congo | Wuxi Sports Center, Wuxi; Attendance: 300; Referees: Opava, Válek (CZE) |
| 7 December 2009; 19:00 | Kastrup, L. Pedersen 7 | (20–12) | Okoye Mbon 7 | Wuxi Sports Center, Wuxi; Attendance: 300; Referees: Opava, Válek (CZE) |
| 7 December 2009; 19:00 | 2× (yellow card) 7× (suspension) | Report | 3× (yellow card) 6× (suspension) | Wuxi Sports Center, Wuxi; Attendance: 300; Referees: Opava, Válek (CZE) |

| 7 December 2009; 21:00 | France | 23–21 | Sweden | Wuxi Sports Center, Wuxi; Attendance: 200; Referees: Florescu, Duţă (ROU) |
| 7 December 2009; 21:00 | Signaté 4 | (9–13) | Boson 5 | Wuxi Sports Center, Wuxi; Attendance: 200; Referees: Florescu, Duţă (ROU) |
| 7 December 2009; 21:00 | 3× (yellow card) 3× (suspension) | Report | 4× (yellow card) 3× (suspension) | Wuxi Sports Center, Wuxi; Attendance: 200; Referees: Florescu, Duţă (ROU) |

| 9 December 2009; 17:00 | France | 29–22 | Congo | Wuxi Sports Center, Wuxi; Attendance: 100; Referees: Horváth, Márton (HUN) |
| 9 December 2009; 17:00 | Limal 5 | (14–9) | Bassarila, Okoye Mbon 7 | Wuxi Sports Center, Wuxi; Attendance: 100; Referees: Horváth, Márton (HUN) |
| 9 December 2009; 17:00 | 3× (yellow card) 6× (suspension) | Report | 3× (yellow card) 4× (suspension) | Wuxi Sports Center, Wuxi; Attendance: 100; Referees: Horváth, Márton (HUN) |

| 9 December 2009; 19:00 | Brazil | 21–28 | Denmark | Wuxi Sports Center, Wuxi; Attendance: 402; Referees: Florescu, Duţă (ROU) |
| 9 December 2009; 19:00 | Amorim, da Costa, Rodrigues 4 | (9–14) | Troelsen 6 | Wuxi Sports Center, Wuxi; Attendance: 402; Referees: Florescu, Duţă (ROU) |
| 9 December 2009; 19:00 | 2× (yellow card) 4× (suspension) | Report | 3× (yellow card) 4× (suspension) | Wuxi Sports Center, Wuxi; Attendance: 402; Referees: Florescu, Duţă (ROU) |

| 9 December 2009; 21:00 | Sweden | 27–33 | Germany | Wuxi Sports Center, Wuxi; Attendance: 200; Referees: Opava, Válek, (CZE) |
| 9 December 2009; 21:00 | Isakson, Gulldén 5 | (12–18) | Mietzner 9 | Wuxi Sports Center, Wuxi; Attendance: 200; Referees: Opava, Válek, (CZE) |
| 9 December 2009; 21:00 | 4× (yellow card) 5× (suspension) | Report | 4× (yellow card) 3× (suspension) | Wuxi Sports Center, Wuxi; Attendance: 200; Referees: Opava, Válek, (CZE) |

| 10 December 2009; 17:00 | Congo | 28–36 | Brazil | Wuxi Sports Center, Wuxi; Attendance: 100; Referees: Opava, Válek (CZE) |
| 10 December 2009; 17:00 | Itoua Atsono 8 | (13–19) | da Costa 13 | Wuxi Sports Center, Wuxi; Attendance: 100; Referees: Opava, Válek (CZE) |
| 10 December 2009; 17:00 | 4× (yellow card) 4× (suspension) | Report | 3× (yellow card) 7× (suspension) 1× (red card) | Wuxi Sports Center, Wuxi; Attendance: 100; Referees: Opava, Válek (CZE) |

| 10 December 2009; 19:00 | Germany | 15–29 | France | Wuxi Sports Center, Wuxi; Attendance: 300; Referees: Horváth, Márton (HUN) |
| 10 December 2009; 19:00 | Mietzner 5 | (10–10) | Mendy 6 | Wuxi Sports Center, Wuxi; Attendance: 300; Referees: Horváth, Márton (HUN) |
| 10 December 2009; 19:00 | 3× (yellow card) 4× (suspension) | Report | 2× (yellow card) 6× (suspension) | Wuxi Sports Center, Wuxi; Attendance: 300; Referees: Horváth, Márton (HUN) |

| 10 December 2009; 21:00 | Sweden | 27–23 | Denmark | Wuxi Sports Center, Wuxi; Attendance: 350; Referees: Raluy, Sabroso (ESP) |
| 10 December 2009; 21:00 | Ahlm 7 | (14–10) | Mortensen L. 7 | Wuxi Sports Center, Wuxi; Attendance: 350; Referees: Raluy, Sabroso (ESP) |
| 10 December 2009; 21:00 | 3× (yellow card) 3× (suspension) | Report | 3× (yellow card) 3× (suspension) | Wuxi Sports Center, Wuxi; Attendance: 350; Referees: Raluy, Sabroso (ESP) |

=== Group B ===
| Pos | Team | Pld | W | D | L | GF | GA | GD | Pts | Qualification |
|---|---|---|---|---|---|---|---|---|---|---|
| 1 | Russia | 5 | 5 | 0 | 0 | 175 | 74 | +101 | 10 | Main round |
| 2 | Austria | 5 | 3 | 0 | 2 | 175 | 106 | +69 | 6 (Note: Austria 2 Pts, +6 GD; Angola 2 Pts, +1 GD; Ukraine 2 Pts, –7 GD) | Main round |
| 3 | Angola | 5 | 3 | 0 | 2 | 145 | 96 | +49 | 6 | Main round |
| 4 | Ukraine | 5 | 3 | 0 | 2 | 151 | 106 | +45 | 6 | |
| 5 | Thailand | 5 | 1 | 0 | 4 | 73 | 192 | −119 | 2 | |
| 6 | Australia | 5 | 0 | 0 | 5 | 52 | 197 | −145 | 0 | |

Rules for classification: 1) points; 2) head-to-head points; 3) head-to-head goal difference; 4) head-to-head number of goals scored; 5) goal difference.
Notes:

| 5 December 2009; 17:00 | Angola | 39–9 | Australia | Zhangjiagang Sports Center Gym, Zhangjiagang; Attendance: 100; Referees: Behi, Farah (TUN) |
| 5 December 2009; 17:00 | Wuta, Natália 6 | (22–6) | Sørensen 4 | Zhangjiagang Sports Center Gym, Zhangjiagang; Attendance: 100; Referees: Behi, Farah (TUN) |
| 5 December 2009; 17:00 | 3× (yellow card) | Report | 3× (yellow card) 3× (suspension) | Zhangjiagang Sports Center Gym, Zhangjiagang; Attendance: 100; Referees: Behi, Farah (TUN) |

| 5 December 2009; 19:00 | Austria | 52–11 | Thailand | Zhangjiagang Sports Center Gym, Zhangjiagang; Attendance: 250; Referees: Marina, Minore (ARG) |
| 5 December 2009; 19:00 | Plach 8 | (24–7) | Sila, Thanawat 3 | Zhangjiagang Sports Center Gym, Zhangjiagang; Attendance: 250; Referees: Marina, Minore (ARG) |
| 5 December 2009; 19:00 | 2× (yellow card) | Report | 3× (yellow card) 3× (suspension) | Zhangjiagang Sports Center Gym, Zhangjiagang; Attendance: 250; Referees: Marina, Minore (ARG) |

| 5 December 2009; 21:00 | Russia | 27–18 | Ukraine | Zhangjiagang Sports Center Gym, Zhangjiagang; Attendance: 250; Referees: Andersen, Sødal (NOR) |
| 5 December 2009; 21:00 | Turey 5 | (11–10) | Nikolayenko 5 | Zhangjiagang Sports Center Gym, Zhangjiagang; Attendance: 250; Referees: Andersen, Sødal (NOR) |
| 5 December 2009; 21:00 | 3× (yellow card) 2× (suspension) | Report | 2× (yellow card) 3× (suspension) | Zhangjiagang Sports Center Gym, Zhangjiagang; Attendance: 250; Referees: Andersen, Sødal (NOR) |

| 6 December 2009; 17:00 | Australia | 10–45 | Austria | Zhangjiagang Sports Center Gym, Zhangjiagang; Attendance: 100; Referees: Liu S., Liu F. (CHN) |
| 6 December 2009; 17:00 | Sørensen, M. Kelly, Brunsberg 2 | (5–22) | Spiridon 8 | Zhangjiagang Sports Center Gym, Zhangjiagang; Attendance: 100; Referees: Liu S., Liu F. (CHN) |
| 6 December 2009; 17:00 | 2× (yellow card) 1× (suspension) | Report | 2× (yellow card) | Zhangjiagang Sports Center Gym, Zhangjiagang; Attendance: 100; Referees: Liu S., Liu F. (CHN) |

| 6 December 2009; 19:00 | Ukraine | 20–28 | Angola | Zhangjiagang Sports Center Gym, Zhangjiagang; Attendance: 1,000; Referees: Maria, Minore (ARG) |
| 6 December 2009; 19:00 | Tsybulenko 6 | (10–14) | Elzira 9 | Zhangjiagang Sports Center Gym, Zhangjiagang; Attendance: 1,000; Referees: Maria, Minore (ARG) |
| 6 December 2009; 19:00 | 4× (yellow card) 3× (suspension) | Report | 3× (yellow card) 5× (suspension) | Zhangjiagang Sports Center Gym, Zhangjiagang; Attendance: 1,000; Referees: Maria, Minore (ARG) |

| 6 December 2009; 21:00 | Thailand | 8–45 | Russia | Zhangjiagang Sports Center Gym, Zhangjiagang; Attendance: 100; Referees: Beji, Farah (TUN) |
| 6 December 2009; 21:00 | Thanawat 5 | (6–19) | Zhilinskayte 8 | Zhangjiagang Sports Center Gym, Zhangjiagang; Attendance: 100; Referees: Beji, Farah (TUN) |
| 6 December 2009; 21:00 | 3× (yellow card) 5× (suspension) | Report | 3× (yellow card) 3× (suspension) | Zhangjiagang Sports Center Gym, Zhangjiagang; Attendance: 100; Referees: Beji, Farah (TUN) |

| 7 December 2009; 17:00 | Ukraine | 41–13 | Thailand | Zhangjiagang Sports Center Gym, Zhangjiagang; Attendance: 150; Referees: Liu S., Liu F. (CHN) |
| 7 December 2009; 17:00 | Boklashchuk, Tsybulenko 6 | (21–8) | Suphasanan 4 | Zhangjiagang Sports Center Gym, Zhangjiagang; Attendance: 150; Referees: Liu S., Liu F. (CHN) |
| 7 December 2009; 17:00 | 2× (yellow card) 1× (suspension) | Report | 1× (yellow card) 3× (suspension) | Zhangjiagang Sports Center Gym, Zhangjiagang; Attendance: 150; Referees: Liu S., Liu F. (CHN) |

| 7 December 2009; 19:00 | Angola | 21–28 | Austria | Zhangjiagang Sports Center Gym, Zhangjiagang; Attendance: 900; Referees: Andersen, Sødal (NOR) |
| 7 December 2009; 19:00 | Elzira 10 | (12–16) | Engel 14 | Zhangjiagang Sports Center Gym, Zhangjiagang; Attendance: 900; Referees: Andersen, Sødal (NOR) |
| 7 December 2009; 19:00 | 4× (yellow card) 1× (suspension) 1× (red card) | Report | 3× (yellow card) 4× (suspension) | Zhangjiagang Sports Center Gym, Zhangjiagang; Attendance: 900; Referees: Andersen, Sødal (NOR) |

| 7 December 2009; 21:00 | Russia | 48–8 | Australia | Zhangjiagang Sports Center Gym, Zhangjiagang; Attendance: 80; Referees: Marina, Minore (ARG) |
| 7 December 2009; 21:00 | Turey 8 | (27–3) | Sørensen 3 | Zhangjiagang Sports Center Gym, Zhangjiagang; Attendance: 80; Referees: Marina, Minore (ARG) |
| 7 December 2009; 21:00 | 1× (yellow card) | Report | 2× (yellow card) 2× (suspension) | Zhangjiagang Sports Center Gym, Zhangjiagang; Attendance: 80; Referees: Marina, Minore (ARG) |

| 9 December 2009; 17:00 | Angola | 36–16 | Thailand | Zhangjiagang Sports Center Gym, Zhangjiagang; Attendance: 60; Referees: Andersen, Sødal (NOR) |
| 9 December 2009; 17:00 | Azenaide 9 | (21–5) | Thanawat 7 | Zhangjiagang Sports Center Gym, Zhangjiagang; Attendance: 60; Referees: Andersen, Sødal (NOR) |
| 9 December 2009; 17:00 | 2× (yellow card) 2× (suspension) | Report | 3× (yellow card) 2× (suspension) | Zhangjiagang Sports Center Gym, Zhangjiagang; Attendance: 60; Referees: Andersen, Sødal (NOR) |

| 9 December 2009; 19:00 | Australia | 7–40 | Ukraine | Zhangjiagang Sports Center Gym, Zhangjiagang; Attendance: 750; Referees: Liu S., Liu F. (CHN) |
| 9 December 2009; 19:00 | Sørensen, Thomas 2 | (4–19) | Shkliaruk 6 | Zhangjiagang Sports Center Gym, Zhangjiagang; Attendance: 750; Referees: Liu S., Liu F. (CHN) |
| 9 December 2009; 19:00 | 3× (yellow card) 5× (suspension) | Report | 1× (yellow card) 1× (suspension) | Zhangjiagang Sports Center Gym, Zhangjiagang; Attendance: 750; Referees: Liu S., Liu F. (CHN) |

| 9 December 2009; 21:00 | Austria | 19–32 | Russia | Zhangjiagang Sports Center Gym, Zhangjiagang; Attendance: 200; Referees: Beji, Farah (TUN) |
| 9 December 2009; 21:00 | Engel 6 | (10–17) | Turey 7 | Zhangjiagang Sports Center Gym, Zhangjiagang; Attendance: 200; Referees: Beji, Farah (TUN) |
| 9 December 2009; 21:00 | 4× (yellow card) 5× (suspension) | Report | 3× (yellow card) 3× (suspension) | Zhangjiagang Sports Center Gym, Zhangjiagang; Attendance: 200; Referees: Beji, Farah (TUN) |

| 10 December 2009; 17:00 | Thailand | 25–18 | Australia | Zhangjiagang Sports Center Gym, Zhangjiagang; Attendance: 50; Referees: Liu S., Liu F. (CHN) |
| 10 December 2009; 17:00 | Phonsen | (13–10) | Sørensen 7 | Zhangjiagang Sports Center Gym, Zhangjiagang; Attendance: 50; Referees: Liu S., Liu F. (CHN) |
| 10 December 2009; 17:00 | 3× (yellow card) 1× (suspension) | Report | 3× (yellow card) 2× (suspension) | Zhangjiagang Sports Center Gym, Zhangjiagang; Attendance: 50; Referees: Liu S., Liu F. (CHN) |

| 10 December 2009; 19:00 | Austria | 31–32 | Ukraine | Zhangjiagang Sports Center Gym, Zhangjiagang; Attendance: 1,000; Referees: Marina, Minore (ARG) |
| 10 December 2009; 19:00 | Subke, Engel 8 | (17–15) | Nykolayenko 10 | Zhangjiagang Sports Center Gym, Zhangjiagang; Attendance: 1,000; Referees: Marina, Minore (ARG) |
| 10 December 2009; 19:00 | 3× (yellow card) 2× (suspension) | Report | 3× (yellow card) 3× (suspension) | Zhangjiagang Sports Center Gym, Zhangjiagang; Attendance: 1,000; Referees: Marina, Minore (ARG) |

| 10 December 2009; 21:00 | Russia | 23–21 | Angola | Zhangjiagang Sports Center Gym, Zhangjiagang; Attendance: 120; Referees: Beji, Farah (TUN) |
| 10 December 2009; 21:00 | Postnova 5 | (11–12) | Elzira 8 | Zhangjiagang Sports Center Gym, Zhangjiagang; Attendance: 120; Referees: Beji, Farah (TUN) |
| 10 December 2009; 21:00 | 4× (yellow card) 3× (suspension) | Report | 4× (yellow card) 4× (suspension) | Zhangjiagang Sports Center Gym, Zhangjiagang; Attendance: 120; Referees: Beji, Farah (TUN) |

=== Group C ===
| Pos | Team | Pld | W | D | L | GF | GA | GD | Pts | Qualification |
|---|---|---|---|---|---|---|---|---|---|---|
| 1 | Norway | 5 | 5 | 0 | 0 | 164 | 102 | +62 | 10 | Main round |
| 2 | Romania | 5 | 4 | 0 | 1 | 182 | 117 | +65 | 8 | Main round |
| 3 | Hungary | 5 | 3 | 0 | 2 | 160 | 123 | +37 | 6 | Main round |
| 4 | Japan | 5 | 1 | 1 | 3 | 144 | 156 | −12 | 3 | |
| 5 | Tunisia | 5 | 1 | 1 | 3 | 137 | 155 | −18 | 3 | |
| 6 | Chile | 5 | 0 | 0 | 5 | 81 | 215 | −134 | 0 | |

Rules for classification: 1) points; 2) head-to-head points; 3) head-to-head goal difference; 4) head-to-head number of goals scored; 5) goal difference.

| 5 December 2009; 17:15 | Romania | 51–17 | Chile | Suzhou Sports Center, Suzhou; Attendance: 500; Referees: Līcis, Stoļarovs (LAT) |
| 5 December 2009; 17:15 | Stanca 10 | (20–7) | Feuchtmann 6 | Suzhou Sports Center, Suzhou; Attendance: 500; Referees: Līcis, Stoļarovs (LAT) |
| 5 December 2009; 17:15 | 3× (yellow card) 1× (suspension) | Report | 5× (yellow card) 3× (suspension) | Suzhou Sports Center, Suzhou; Attendance: 500; Referees: Līcis, Stoļarovs (LAT) |

| 5 December 2009; 19:15 | Norway | 34–19 | Japan | Suzhou Sports Center, Suzhou; Attendance: 750; Referees: Guseva, Vartanian (RUS) |
| 5 December 2009; 19:15 | Riegelhuth, Herrem 7 | (15–9) | Uegaki 8 | Suzhou Sports Center, Suzhou; Attendance: 750; Referees: Guseva, Vartanian (RUS) |
| 5 December 2009; 19:15 | 3× (yellow card) 1× (suspension) | Report | 2× (yellow card) 5× (suspension) 1× (red card) | Suzhou Sports Center, Suzhou; Attendance: 750; Referees: Guseva, Vartanian (RUS) |

| 5 December 2009; 21:15 | Hungary | 33–25 | Tunisia | Suzhou Sports Center, Suzhou; Attendance: 500; Referees: Brunovský, Čanda (SVK) |
| 5 December 2009; 21:15 | Tóth 9 | (15–11) | Khouildi 8 | Suzhou Sports Center, Suzhou; Attendance: 500; Referees: Brunovský, Čanda (SVK) |
| 5 December 2009; 21:15 | 3× (yellow card) 7× (suspension) 1× (red card) | Report | 3× (yellow card) 7× (suspension) | Suzhou Sports Center, Suzhou; Attendance: 500; Referees: Brunovský, Čanda (SVK) |

| 6 December 2009; 17:15 | Chile | 14–48 | Hungary | Suzhou Sports Center, Suzhou; Attendance: 200; Referees: Guseva, Vartanian (RUS) |
| 6 December 2009; 17:15 | Canessa 6 | (6–24) | Zácsik, Juhasz 8 | Suzhou Sports Center, Suzhou; Attendance: 200; Referees: Guseva, Vartanian (RUS) |
| 6 December 2009; 17:15 | 3× (yellow card) 3× (suspension) | Report | 3× (yellow card) 2× (suspension) | Suzhou Sports Center, Suzhou; Attendance: 200; Referees: Guseva, Vartanian (RUS) |

| 6 December 2009; 19:15 | Tunisia | 25–36 | Norway | Suzhou Sports Center, Suzhou; Attendance: 200; Referees: Geipel, Helbig (GER) |
| 6 December 2009; 19:15 | Chebbah 7 | (14–18) | Johansen, Løke 6 | Suzhou Sports Center, Suzhou; Attendance: 200; Referees: Geipel, Helbig (GER) |
| 6 December 2009; 19:15 | 3× (yellow card) 1× (suspension) | Report | 3× (yellow card) | Suzhou Sports Center, Suzhou; Attendance: 200; Referees: Geipel, Helbig (GER) |

| 6 December 2009; 21:15 | Japan | 28–37 | Romania | Suzhou Sports Center, Suzhou; Attendance: 200; Referees: Brunovský, Čanda (SVK) |
| 6 December 2009; 21:15 | Uegaki 8 | (17–17) | Puşcaşu 9 | Suzhou Sports Center, Suzhou; Attendance: 200; Referees: Brunovský, Čanda (SVK) |
| 6 December 2009; 21:15 | 3× (yellow card) 1× (suspension) | Report | 3× (yellow card) 3× (suspension) | Suzhou Sports Center, Suzhou; Attendance: 200; Referees: Brunovský, Čanda (SVK) |

| 7 December 2009; 17:15 | Japan | 31–31 | Tunisia | Suzhou Sports Center, Suzhou; Attendance: 250; Referees: Līcis, Stoļarovs (LAT) |
| 7 December 2009; 17:15 | Fujii 10 | (16–14) | Elghaoui, Chebbah 7 | Suzhou Sports Center, Suzhou; Attendance: 250; Referees: Līcis, Stoļarovs (LAT) |
| 7 December 2009; 17:15 | 3× (yellow card) 5× (suspension) 1× (red card) | Report | 4× (yellow card) 6× (suspension) 1× (red card) | Suzhou Sports Center, Suzhou; Attendance: 250; Referees: Līcis, Stoļarovs (LAT) |

| 7 December 2009; 19:15 | Norway | 44–15 | Chile | Suzhou Sports Center, Suzhou; Attendance: 400; Referees: Brunovský, Čanda (SVK) |
| 7 December 2009; 19:15 | Riegelhuth 9 | (21–7) | Feuchtmann 3 | Suzhou Sports Center, Suzhou; Attendance: 400; Referees: Brunovský, Čanda (SVK) |
| 7 December 2009; 19:15 | 2× (yellow card) | Report | 2× (yellow card) 4× (suspension) | Suzhou Sports Center, Suzhou; Attendance: 400; Referees: Brunovský, Čanda (SVK) |

| 7 December 2009; 21:15 | Romania | 31–25 | Hungary | Suzhou Sports Center, Suzhou; Attendance: 200; Referees: Geipel, Helbig (GER) |
| 7 December 2009; 21:15 | Lecuşanu 12 | (16–7) | Tóth 7 | Suzhou Sports Center, Suzhou; Attendance: 200; Referees: Geipel, Helbig (GER) |
| 7 December 2009; 21:15 | 3× (yellow card) 1× (suspension) | Report | 3× (yellow card) 6× (suspension) | Suzhou Sports Center, Suzhou; Attendance: 200; Referees: Geipel, Helbig (GER) |

| 9 December 2009; 17:15 | Chile | 19–38 | Japan | Suzhou Sports Center, Suzhou; Attendance: 100; Referees: Geipel, Helbig (GER) |
| 9 December 2009; 17:15 | Canessa, Feuchtmann, Flores 6 | (13–19) | Fujii, Takahashi, Uegaki 6 | Suzhou Sports Center, Suzhou; Attendance: 100; Referees: Geipel, Helbig (GER) |
| 9 December 2009; 17:15 | 3× (yellow card) | Report | | Suzhou Sports Center, Suzhou; Attendance: 100; Referees: Geipel, Helbig (GER) |

| 9 December 2009; 19:15 | Hungary | 19–25 | Norway | Suzhou Sports Center, Suzhou; Attendance: 700; Referees: Līcis, Stoļarovs (LAT) |
| 9 December 2009; 19:15 | Bulath, Vérten 3 | (11–11) | Riegelhuth 6 | Suzhou Sports Center, Suzhou; Attendance: 700; Referees: Līcis, Stoļarovs (LAT) |
| 9 December 2009; 19:15 | 3× (yellow card) 1× (suspension) | Report | 2× (yellow card) | Suzhou Sports Center, Suzhou; Attendance: 700; Referees: Līcis, Stoļarovs (LAT) |

| 9 December 2009; 21:15 | Romania | 39–22 | Tunisia | Suzhou Sports Center, Suzhou; Attendance: 200; Referees: Guseva, Vartanian (RUS) |
| 9 December 2009; 21:15 | Puşcaşu 7 | (23–10) | Khouildi 6 | Suzhou Sports Center, Suzhou; Attendance: 200; Referees: Guseva, Vartanian (RUS) |
| 9 December 2009; 21:15 | 2× (yellow card) 2× (suspension) | Report | 1× (yellow card) 2× (suspension) | Suzhou Sports Center, Suzhou; Attendance: 200; Referees: Guseva, Vartanian (RUS) |

| 10 December 2009; 17:15 | Tunisia | 34–16 | Chile | Suzhou Sports Center, Suzhou; Attendance: 100; Referees: Chen, Lu (CHN) |
| 10 December 2009; 17:15 | Msaad, Chebbah 8 | (21–7) | Musalem 6 | Suzhou Sports Center, Suzhou; Attendance: 100; Referees: Chen, Lu (CHN) |
| 10 December 2009; 17:15 | 2× (yellow card) 2× (suspension) | Report | 3× (yellow card) 3× (suspension) | Suzhou Sports Center, Suzhou; Attendance: 100; Referees: Chen, Lu (CHN) |

| 10 December 2009; 19:15 | Norway | 25–24 | Romania | Suzhou Sports Center, Suzhou; Attendance: 1,000; Referees: Brunovský, Čanda (SVK) |
| 10 December 2009; 19:15 | Nøstvold, Riegelhuth 5 | (14–12) | Neagu 9 | Suzhou Sports Center, Suzhou; Attendance: 1,000; Referees: Brunovský, Čanda (SVK) |
| 10 December 2009; 19:15 | 3× (yellow card) 3× (suspension) | Report | 2× (yellow card) 2× (suspension) | Suzhou Sports Center, Suzhou; Attendance: 1,000; Referees: Brunovský, Čanda (SVK) |

| 10 December 2009; 21:15 | Hungary | 35–28 | Japan | Suzhou Sports Center, Suzhou; Attendance: 300; Referees: Geipel, Helbig (GER) |
| 10 December 2009; 21:15 | Tóth 8 | (15–14) | Fujii 8 | Suzhou Sports Center, Suzhou; Attendance: 300; Referees: Geipel, Helbig (GER) |
| 10 December 2009; 21:15 | 3× (yellow card) 3× (suspension) | Report | 3× (yellow card) 1× (suspension) | Suzhou Sports Center, Suzhou; Attendance: 300; Referees: Geipel, Helbig (GER) |

=== Group D ===
| Pos | Team | Pld | W | D | L | GF | GA | GD | Pts | Qualification |
|---|---|---|---|---|---|---|---|---|---|---|
| 1 | Spain | 5 | 5 | 0 | 0 | 147 | 84 | +63 | 10 | Main round |
| 2 | South Korea | 5 | 4 | 0 | 1 | 170 | 115 | +55 | 8 | Main round |
| 3 | China (H) | 5 | 3 | 0 | 2 | 123 | 109 | +14 | 6 | Main round |
| 4 | Ivory Coast | 5 | 1 | 1 | 3 | 114 | 140 | −26 | 3 | |
| 5 | Kazakhstan | 5 | 1 | 0 | 4 | 96 | 148 | −52 | 2 | |
| 6 | Argentina | 5 | 0 | 1 | 4 | 88 | 142 | −54 | 1 | |

Rules for classification: 1) points; 2) head-to-head points; 3) head-to-head goal difference; 4) head-to-head number of goals scored; 5) goal difference.
(H) Hosts

| 5 December 2009; 15:30 | South Korea | 39–21 | Kazakhstan | Changzhou Olympic Sports Center, Changzhou; Attendance: 500; Referees: Gatelis, Mažeika (LTU) |
| 5 December 2009; 15:30 | Jung J. 8 | (17–14) | Yegunova 6 | Changzhou Olympic Sports Center, Changzhou; Attendance: 500; Referees: Gatelis, Mažeika (LTU) |
| 5 December 2009; 15:30 | 2× (yellow card) 3× (suspension) | Report | 4× (yellow card) 3× (suspension) | Changzhou Olympic Sports Center, Changzhou; Attendance: 500; Referees: Gatelis, Mažeika (LTU) |

| 5 December 2009; 17:30 | Spain | 29–18 | Ivory Coast | Changzhou Olympic Sports Center, Changzhou; Attendance: 300; Referees: Al-Mutawa, Al-Suwailam (KUW) |
| 5 December 2009; 17:30 | Aguilar, Benzal 6 | (13–9) | Mambo, Gondo-Bredou 4 | Changzhou Olympic Sports Center, Changzhou; Attendance: 300; Referees: Al-Mutawa, Al-Suwailam (KUW) |
| 5 December 2009; 17:30 | 3× (yellow card) 4× (suspension) | Report | 3× (yellow card) 3× (suspension) | Changzhou Olympic Sports Center, Changzhou; Attendance: 300; Referees: Al-Mutawa, Al-Suwailam (KUW) |

| 5 December 2009; 19:30 | China | 26–15 | Argentina | Changzhou Olympic Sports Center, Changzhou; Attendance: 2,500; Referees: Gjeding, Hansen (DEN) |
| 5 December 2009; 19:30 | Wei Q., Li Y. 6 | (12–6) | Decilio 7 | Changzhou Olympic Sports Center, Changzhou; Attendance: 2,500; Referees: Gjeding, Hansen (DEN) |
| 5 December 2009; 19:30 | 3× (yellow card) 6× (suspension) | Report | 3× (yellow card) 3× (suspension) | Changzhou Olympic Sports Center, Changzhou; Attendance: 2,500; Referees: Gjeding, Hansen (DEN) |

| 6 December 2009; 15:30 | Ivory Coast | 26–35 | South Korea | Changzhou Olympic Sports Center, Changzhou; Attendance: 300; Referees: Gjeding, Hansen (DEN) |
| 6 December 2009; 15:30 | Gondo-Bredou 6 | (13–15) | Kim O. 8 | Changzhou Olympic Sports Center, Changzhou; Attendance: 300; Referees: Gjeding, Hansen (DEN) |
| 6 December 2009; 15:30 | 3× (yellow card) 5× (suspension) | Report | 3× (yellow card) 4× (suspension) | Changzhou Olympic Sports Center, Changzhou; Attendance: 300; Referees: Gjeding, Hansen (DEN) |

| 6 December 2009; 17:30 | Argentina | 15–33 | Spain | Changzhou Olympic Sports Center, Changzhou; Attendance: 500; Referees: Gatelis, Mažeika (LTU) |
| 6 December 2009; 17:30 | Decilio 5 | (9–14) | Aguilar 9 | Changzhou Olympic Sports Center, Changzhou; Attendance: 500; Referees: Gatelis, Mažeika (LTU) |
| 6 December 2009; 17:30 | 3× (yellow card) 7× (suspension) | Report | 3× (yellow card) 4× (suspension) | Changzhou Olympic Sports Center, Changzhou; Attendance: 500; Referees: Gatelis, Mažeika (LTU) |

| 6 December 2009; 19:30 | Kazakhstan | 13–25 | China | Changzhou Olympic Sports Center, Changzhou; Attendance: 2,500; Referees: C. Bonaventura, J. Bonaventura (FRA) |
| 6 December 2009; 19:30 | Yakovleva 5 | (7–9) | Li W. 7 | Changzhou Olympic Sports Center, Changzhou; Attendance: 2,500; Referees: C. Bonaventura, J. Bonaventura (FRA) |
| 6 December 2009; 19:30 | 2× (yellow card) 3× (suspension) | Report | 2× (yellow card) 1× (suspension) | Changzhou Olympic Sports Center, Changzhou; Attendance: 2,500; Referees: C. Bonaventura, J. Bonaventura (FRA) |

| 7 December 2009; 14:30 | Ivory Coast | 19–19 | Argentina | Changzhou Olympic Sports Center, Changzhou; Attendance: 500; Referees: Al-Mutawa, Al-Suwailam (KUW) |
| 7 December 2009; 14:30 | Kuyo, Mambo, Karamoko 4 | (11–10) | Mendoza 7 | Changzhou Olympic Sports Center, Changzhou; Attendance: 500; Referees: Al-Mutawa, Al-Suwailam (KUW) |
| 7 December 2009; 14:30 | 3× (yellow card) 5× (suspension) 1× (red card) | Report | 4× (yellow card) 3× (suspension) | Changzhou Olympic Sports Center, Changzhou; Attendance: 500; Referees: Al-Mutawa, Al-Suwailam (KUW) |

| 7 December 2009; 16:30 | South Korea | 33–25 | China | Changzhou Olympic Sports Center, Changzhou; Attendance: 5,000; Referees: Gatelis, Mažeika (LTU) |
| 7 December 2009; 16:30 | Woo S., Kim O., Moon P. 7 | (17–13) | Li W. 8 | Changzhou Olympic Sports Center, Changzhou; Attendance: 5,000; Referees: Gatelis, Mažeika (LTU) |
| 7 December 2009; 16:30 | 3× (yellow card) 1× (suspension) | Report | 3× (yellow card) 4× (suspension) | Changzhou Olympic Sports Center, Changzhou; Attendance: 5,000; Referees: Gatelis, Mažeika (LTU) |

| 7 December 2009; 18:30 | Spain | 30–12 | Kazakhstan | Changzhou Olympic Sports Center, Changzhou; Attendance: 200; Referees: Gjeding, Hansen (DEN) |
| 7 December 2009; 18:30 | Mangué 6 | (12–5) | Yefimova 3 | Changzhou Olympic Sports Center, Changzhou; Attendance: 200; Referees: Gjeding, Hansen (DEN) |
| 7 December 2009; 18:30 | 3× (yellow card) 1× (suspension) | Report | 2× (yellow card) 4× (suspension) | Changzhou Olympic Sports Center, Changzhou; Attendance: 200; Referees: Gjeding, Hansen (DEN) |

| 9 December 2009; 14:30 | Kazakhstan | 22–30 | Ivory Coast | Changzhou Olympic Sports Center, Changzhou; Attendance: 200; Referees: Gatelis, Mažeika (LTU) |
| 9 December 2009; 14:30 | Kozlova 7 | (13–13) | Mambo 10 | Changzhou Olympic Sports Center, Changzhou; Attendance: 200; Referees: Gatelis, Mažeika (LTU) |
| 9 December 2009; 14:30 | 3× (yellow card) 2× (suspension) | Report | 3× (yellow card) 3× (suspension) | Changzhou Olympic Sports Center, Changzhou; Attendance: 200; Referees: Gatelis, Mažeika (LTU) |

| 9 December 2009; 16:30 | China | 12–27 | Spain | Changzhou Olympic Sports Center, Changzhou; Attendance: 2,000; Referees: C. Bonaventura, J. Bonaventura (FRA) |
| 9 December 2009; 16:30 | Liu X. 4 | (9–11) | Mangué 7 | Changzhou Olympic Sports Center, Changzhou; Attendance: 2,000; Referees: C. Bonaventura, J. Bonaventura (FRA) |
| 9 December 2009; 16:30 | 3× (yellow card) 4× (suspension) | Report | 3× (yellow card) | Changzhou Olympic Sports Center, Changzhou; Attendance: 2,000; Referees: C. Bonaventura, J. Bonaventura (FRA) |

| 9 December 2009; 18:30 | South Korea | 36–15 | Argentina | Changzhou Olympic Sports Center, Changzhou; Attendance: 200; Referees: Al-Mutawa, Al-Suwailam (KUW) |
| 9 December 2009; 18:30 | Lee S., Nam H., Park H., Yoo H. 5 | (19–10) | Bianchi 4 | Changzhou Olympic Sports Center, Changzhou; Attendance: 200; Referees: Al-Mutawa, Al-Suwailam (KUW) |
| 9 December 2009; 18:30 | 3× (yellow card) 3× (suspension) | Report | 3× (yellow card) 6× (suspension) | Changzhou Olympic Sports Center, Changzhou; Attendance: 200; Referees: Al-Mutawa, Al-Suwailam (KUW) |

| 10 December 2009; 14:30 | Argentina | 24–28 | Kazakhstan | Changzhou Olympic Sports Center, Changzhou; Attendance: 100; Referees: C. Bonaventura, J. Bonaventura (FRA) |
| 10 December 2009; 14:30 | Mendoza 7 | (11–12) | Pikalova 7 | Changzhou Olympic Sports Center, Changzhou; Attendance: 100; Referees: C. Bonaventura, J. Bonaventura (FRA) |
| 10 December 2009; 14:30 | 3× (yellow card) 7× (suspension) | Report | 3× (yellow card) 7× (suspension) | Changzhou Olympic Sports Center, Changzhou; Attendance: 100; Referees: C. Bonaventura, J. Bonaventura (FRA) |

| 10 December 2009; 16:30 | China | 35–21 | Ivory Coast | Changzhou Olympic Sports Center, Changzhou; Attendance: 2,500; Referees: Gatelis, Mažeika (LTU) |
| 10 December 2009; 16:30 | Wei Q. 8 | (18–11) | Mambo, Gondo-Bredou 5 | Changzhou Olympic Sports Center, Changzhou; Attendance: 2,500; Referees: Gatelis, Mažeika (LTU) |
| 10 December 2009; 16:30 | 2× (yellow card) 2× (suspension) | Report | 3× (yellow card) 2× (suspension) | Changzhou Olympic Sports Center, Changzhou; Attendance: 2,500; Referees: Gatelis, Mažeika (LTU) |

| 10 December 2009; 18:30 | Spain | 28–27 | South Korea | Changzhou Olympic Sports Center, Changzhou; Attendance: 500; Referees: Gjeding, Hansen (DEN) |
| 10 December 2009; 18:30 | Aguilar 8 | (15–15) | Jung J., Myoung B. 6 | Changzhou Olympic Sports Center, Changzhou; Attendance: 500; Referees: Gjeding, Hansen (DEN) |
| 10 December 2009; 18:30 | 3× (yellow card) 5× (suspension) | Report | 4× (yellow card) 2× (suspension) | Changzhou Olympic Sports Center, Changzhou; Attendance: 500; Referees: Gjeding, Hansen (DEN) |

== Main Round ==
=== Group I ===
| Pos | Team | Pld | W | D | L | GF | GA | GD | Pts | Qualification |
|---|---|---|---|---|---|---|---|---|---|---|
| 1 | France | 5 | 4 | 0 | 1 | 137 | 106 | +31 | 8 (Note: Russia 23–24 France) | Semifinals |
| 2 | Russia | 5 | 4 | 0 | 1 | 142 | 111 | +31 | 8 | Semifinals |
| 3 | Denmark | 5 | 3 | 0 | 2 | 129 | 127 | +2 | 6 | 5th place game |
| 4 | Germany | 5 | 2 | 0 | 3 | 117 | 137 | −20 | 4 | 7th place game |
| 5 | Austria | 5 | 1 | 0 | 4 | 120 | 147 | −27 | 2 (Note: Angola 21–28 Austria) | |
| 6 | Angola | 5 | 1 | 0 | 4 | 115 | 132 | −17 | 2 | |

Source: IHF
Rules for classification: 1) points; 2) head-to-head points; 3) head-to-head goal difference; 4) head-to-head number of goals scored; 5) goal difference.
Notes:

| 12 December 2009; 17:00 | Germany | 22–34 | Russia | Yangzhou Sports Garden, Yangzhou; Attendance: 2,500; Referees: Marina, Minore (ARG) |
| 12 December 2009; 17:00 | Neukamp 8 | (13–16) | Turey 6 | Yangzhou Sports Garden, Yangzhou; Attendance: 2,500; Referees: Marina, Minore (ARG) |
| 12 December 2009; 17:00 | 3× (yellow card) 5× (suspension) | Report | 4× (yellow card) 3× (suspension) | Yangzhou Sports Garden, Yangzhou; Attendance: 2,500; Referees: Marina, Minore (ARG) |

| 12 December 2009; 19:00 | France | 33–24 | Angola | Yangzhou Sports Garden, Yangzhou; Attendance: 2,800; Referees: Horváth, Márton (HUN) |
| 12 December 2009; 19:00 | Goudjo, Deroin, Signaté 4 | (15–9) | Viegas, Elzira 5 | Yangzhou Sports Garden, Yangzhou; Attendance: 2,800; Referees: Horváth, Márton (HUN) |
| 12 December 2009; 19:00 | 4× (yellow card) 2× (suspension) | Report | 4× (yellow card) 7× (suspension) | Yangzhou Sports Garden, Yangzhou; Attendance: 2,800; Referees: Horváth, Márton (HUN) |

| 12 December 2009; 21:00 | Denmark | 30–27 | Austria | Yangzhou Sports Garden, Yangzhou; Attendance: 2,600; Referees: Andersen, Sødal (NOR) |
| 12 December 2009; 21:00 | L. Mortensen 8 | (15–16) | Engel, Spiridon 6 | Yangzhou Sports Garden, Yangzhou; Attendance: 2,600; Referees: Andersen, Sødal (NOR) |
| 12 December 2009; 21:00 | 2× (yellow card) 2× (suspension) | Report | 3× (yellow card) 2× (suspension) | Yangzhou Sports Garden, Yangzhou; Attendance: 2,600; Referees: Andersen, Sødal (NOR) |

| 13 December 2009; 17:00 | Austria | 26–29 | Germany | Yangzhou Sports Garden, Yangzhou; Attendance: 2,000; Referees: Horváth, Márton (HUN) |
| 13 December 2009; 17:00 | Subke 7 | (14–12) | Müller 7 | Yangzhou Sports Garden, Yangzhou; Attendance: 2,000; Referees: Horváth, Márton (HUN) |
| 13 December 2009; 17:00 | 4× (yellow card) 5× (suspension) 1× (red card) | Report | 3× (yellow card) 6× (suspension) | Yangzhou Sports Garden, Yangzhou; Attendance: 2,000; Referees: Horváth, Márton (HUN) |

| 13 December 2009; 19:00 | Russia | 23–24 | France | Yangzhou Sports Garden, Yangzhou; Attendance: 2,500; Referees: Andersen, Sødal (NOR) |
| 13 December 2009; 19:00 | Khmyrova 7 | (14–12) | Baudouin, Limal 5 | Yangzhou Sports Garden, Yangzhou; Attendance: 2,500; Referees: Andersen, Sødal (NOR) |
| 13 December 2009; 19:00 | 3× (yellow card) 3× (suspension) | Report | 3× (yellow card) 3× (suspension) | Yangzhou Sports Garden, Yangzhou; Attendance: 2,500; Referees: Andersen, Sødal (NOR) |

| 13 December 2009; 21:00 | Angola | 28–23 | Denmark | Yangzhou Sports Garden, Yangzhou; Attendance: 2,500; Referees: Gatelis, Mažeika (LTU) |
| 13 December 2009; 21:00 | Elzira, Luísa, Azenaide 6 | (14–14) | Troelsen 9 | Yangzhou Sports Garden, Yangzhou; Attendance: 2,500; Referees: Gatelis, Mažeika (LTU) |
| 13 December 2009; 21:00 | 5× (yellow card) 5× (suspension) | Report | 4× (yellow card) 6× (suspension) | Yangzhou Sports Garden, Yangzhou; Attendance: 2,500; Referees: Gatelis, Mažeika (LTU) |

| 15 December 2009; 17:00 | Germany | 25–21 | Angola | Yangzhou Sports Garden, Yangzhou; Attendance: 1,000; Referees: Horváth, Márton (HUN) |
| 15 December 2009; 17:00 | Müller, Neukamp 4 | (12–13) | Azenaide 8 | Yangzhou Sports Garden, Yangzhou; Attendance: 1,000; Referees: Horváth, Márton (HUN) |
| 15 December 2009; 17:00 | 3× (yellow card) 2× (suspension) | Report | 4× (yellow card) 8× (suspension) 1× (red card) | Yangzhou Sports Garden, Yangzhou; Attendance: 1,000; Referees: Horváth, Márton (HUN) |

| 15 December 2009; 19:00 | France | 35–20 | Austria | Yangzhou Sports Garden, Yangzhou; Attendance: 2,500; Referees: Marina, Minore (ARG) |
| 15 December 2009; 19:00 | Baudouin 10 | (19–12) | Engel 11 | Yangzhou Sports Garden, Yangzhou; Attendance: 2,500; Referees: Marina, Minore (ARG) |
| 15 December 2009; 19:00 | 3× (yellow card) 6× (suspension) | Report | 4× (yellow card) 7× (suspension) 1× (red card) | Yangzhou Sports Garden, Yangzhou; Attendance: 2,500; Referees: Marina, Minore (ARG) |

| 15 December 2009; 21:00 | Denmark | 25–30 | Russia | Yangzhou Sports Garden, Yangzhou; Attendance: 2,500; Referees: Raluy, Sabroso (ESP) |
| 15 December 2009; 21:00 | L. Moretensen 8 | (12–13) | Postnova 8 | Yangzhou Sports Garden, Yangzhou; Attendance: 2,500; Referees: Raluy, Sabroso (ESP) |
| 15 December 2009; 21:00 | 4× (yellow card) 4× (suspension) | Report | 2× (yellow card) 4× (suspension) | Yangzhou Sports Garden, Yangzhou; Attendance: 2,500; Referees: Raluy, Sabroso (ESP) |

=== Group II ===
| Pos | Team | Pld | W | D | L | GF | GA | GD | Pts | Qualification |
|---|---|---|---|---|---|---|---|---|---|---|
| 1 | Norway | 5 | 4 | 0 | 1 | 138 | 114 | +24 | 8 | Semifinals |
| 2 | Spain | 5 | 3 | 1 | 1 | 126 | 112 | +14 | 7 | Semifinals |
| 3 | South Korea | 5 | 2 | 2 | 1 | 150 | 142 | +8 | 6 | 5th place game |
| 4 | Romania | 5 | 2 | 1 | 2 | 154 | 129 | +25 | 5 | 7th place game |
| 5 | Hungary | 5 | 1 | 2 | 2 | 118 | 126 | −8 | 4 | |
| 6 | China (H) | 5 | 0 | 0 | 5 | 96 | 159 | −63 | 0 | |

Source: IHF
Rules for classification: 1) points; 2) head-to-head points; 3) head-to-head goal difference; 4) head-to-head number of goals scored; 5) goal difference.
(H) Hosts

| 12 December 2009; 17:15 | Romania | 40–19 | China | Suzhou Sports Center Gym, Suzhou; Attendance: 1,500; Referees: J. Bonaventura, C. Bonaventura (FRA) |
| 12 December 2009; 17:15 | Puşcaşu, Vărzaru 6 | (21–12) | Lan X. 5 | Suzhou Sports Center Gym, Suzhou; Attendance: 1,500; Referees: J. Bonaventura, C. Bonaventura (FRA) |
| 12 December 2009; 17:15 | 3× (yellow card) | Report | 3× (yellow card) 2× (suspension) | Suzhou Sports Center Gym, Suzhou; Attendance: 1,500; Referees: J. Bonaventura, C. Bonaventura (FRA) |

| 12 December 2009; 19:15 | Norway | 27–28 | South Korea | Suzhou Sports Center Gym, Suzhou; Attendance: 500; Referees: Geipel, Helbig (GER) |
| 12 December 2009; 19:15 | Nøstvold 5 | (14–13) | Yu 7 | Suzhou Sports Center Gym, Suzhou; Attendance: 500; Referees: Geipel, Helbig (GER) |
| 12 December 2009; 19:15 | 2× (yellow card) 3× (suspension) | Report | 2× (yellow card) 3× (suspension) | Suzhou Sports Center Gym, Suzhou; Attendance: 500; Referees: Geipel, Helbig (GER) |

| 12 December 2009; 21:15 | Hungary | 21–21 | Spain | Suzhou Sports Center Gym, Suzhou; Attendance: 500; Referees: Brunovský, Čanda (SVK) |
| 12 December 2009; 21:15 | Zácsik 5 | (8–10) | Martín 6 | Suzhou Sports Center Gym, Suzhou; Attendance: 500; Referees: Brunovský, Čanda (SVK) |
| 12 December 2009; 21:15 | 3× (yellow card) 6× (suspension) 1× (red card) | Report | 2× (yellow card) 3× (suspension) | Suzhou Sports Center Gym, Suzhou; Attendance: 500; Referees: Brunovský, Čanda (SVK) |

| 13 December 2009; 17:15 | South Korea | 28–28 | Hungary | Suzhou Sports Center Gym, Suzhou; Attendance: 500; Referees: Bonaventura J., Bonaventura C. (FRA) |
| 13 December 2009; 17:15 | Kim O., Lee E. 5 | (11–17) | Zácsik 8 | Suzhou Sports Center Gym, Suzhou; Attendance: 500; Referees: Bonaventura J., Bonaventura C. (FRA) |
| 13 December 2009; 17:15 | 3× (yellow card) 2× (suspension) | Report | 4× (yellow card) 7× (suspension) | Suzhou Sports Center Gym, Suzhou; Attendance: 500; Referees: Bonaventura J., Bonaventura C. (FRA) |

| 13 December 2009; 19:15 | China | 19–34 | Norway | Suzhou Sports Center Gym, Suzhou; Attendance: 800; Referees: Brunovský, Čanda (SVK) |
| 13 December 2009; 19:15 | Li W. 5 | (10–18) | Riegelhuth 7 | Suzhou Sports Center Gym, Suzhou; Attendance: 800; Referees: Brunovský, Čanda (SVK) |
| 13 December 2009; 19:15 | 3× (yellow card) 3× (suspension) | Report | 2× (yellow card) 1× (suspension) | Suzhou Sports Center Gym, Suzhou; Attendance: 800; Referees: Brunovský, Čanda (SVK) |

| 13 December 2009; 21:15 | Spain | 26–25 | Romania | Suzhou Sports Center Gym, Suzhou; Attendance: 500; Referees: Gjeding, Hansen (DEN) |
| 13 December 2009; 21:15 | Mangué 8 | (14–12) | Amariei 6 | Suzhou Sports Center Gym, Suzhou; Attendance: 500; Referees: Gjeding, Hansen (DEN) |
| 13 December 2009; 21:15 | 3× (yellow card) 3× (suspension) | Report | 2× (yellow card) 3× (suspension) | Suzhou Sports Center Gym, Suzhou; Attendance: 500; Referees: Gjeding, Hansen (DEN) |

| 15 December 2009; 17:15 | Hungary | 25–21 | China | Suzhou Sports Center Gym, Suzhou; Attendance: 3,000; Referees: Florescu, Duţă (ROU) |
| 15 December 2009; 17:15 | Zácsik 8 | (14–10) | Li W. 9 | Suzhou Sports Center Gym, Suzhou; Attendance: 3,000; Referees: Florescu, Duţă (ROU) |
| 15 December 2009; 17:15 | 2× (yellow card) 2× (suspension) | Report | 3× (yellow card) 4× (suspension) | Suzhou Sports Center Gym, Suzhou; Attendance: 3,000; Referees: Florescu, Duţă (ROU) |

| 15 December 2009; 19:15 | Norway | 27–24 | Spain | Suzhou Sports Center Gym, Suzhou; Attendance: 2,000; Referees: Gjeding, Hansen (DEN) |
| 15 December 2009; 19:15 | Riegelhuth 7 | (8–14) | Aguilar 6 | Suzhou Sports Center Gym, Suzhou; Attendance: 2,000; Referees: Gjeding, Hansen (DEN) |
| 15 December 2009; 19:15 | 2× (yellow card) 5× (suspension) | Report | 3× (yellow card) 4× (suspension) | Suzhou Sports Center Gym, Suzhou; Attendance: 2,000; Referees: Gjeding, Hansen (DEN) |

| 15 December 2009; 21:15 | Romania | 34–34 | South Korea | Suzhou Sports Center Gym, Suzhou; Attendance: 1,000; Referees: Geipel, Helbig (GER) |
| 15 December 2009; 21:15 | Vărzaru, Lecuşanu 6 | (13–19) | Jung J. 9 | Suzhou Sports Center Gym, Suzhou; Attendance: 1,000; Referees: Geipel, Helbig (GER) |
| 15 December 2009; 21:15 | 3× (yellow card) 1× (suspension) | Report | 3× (yellow card) 3× (suspension) | Suzhou Sports Center Gym, Suzhou; Attendance: 1,000; Referees: Geipel, Helbig (GER) |

== President's Cup ==
=== Group I ===
| Team | Pld | W | D | L | GF | GA | GD | Pts |
|---|---|---|---|---|---|---|---|---|
| Sweden | 5 | 5 | 0 | 0 | 203 | 112 | +91 | 10 |
| Brazil | 5 | 4 | 0 | 1 | 184 | 115 | +69 | 8 |
| Ukraine | 5 | 3 | 0 | 2 | 180 | 120 | +60 | 6 |
| Congo | 5 | 2 | 0 | 3 | 142 | 148 | −6 | 4 |
| Thailand | 5 | 1 | 0 | 4 | 99 | 184 | −85 | 2 |
| Australia | 5 | 0 | 0 | 5 | 80 | 209 | −129 | 0 |

Source: IHF
Rules for classification: 1) points; 2) head-to-head points; 3) head-to-head goal difference; 4) head-to-head number of goals scored; 5) goal difference.

| 12 December 2009; 19:00 | Brazil | 45–12 | Australia | Wuxi Sport Center Gym, Wuxi; Attendance: 100; Referees: Chen, Lu (CHN) |
| 12 December 2009; 19:00 | da Silva F., da Silva R. 9 | (20–7) | Sørensen, Brunberg 3 | Wuxi Sport Center Gym, Wuxi; Attendance: 100; Referees: Chen, Lu (CHN) |
| 12 December 2009; 19:00 | 3× (yellow card) 3× (suspension) | Report | 3× (yellow card) 2× (suspension) | Wuxi Sport Center Gym, Wuxi; Attendance: 100; Referees: Chen, Lu (CHN) |

| 12 December 2009; 15:00 | Congo | 30–38 | Ukraine | Wuxi Sport Center Gym, Wuxi; Attendance: 98; Referees: Florescu, Duţă (ROU) |
| 12 December 2009; 15:00 | Itoua Atsono 9 | (16–20) | Tsybulenko, Manaharova 7 | Wuxi Sport Center Gym, Wuxi; Attendance: 98; Referees: Florescu, Duţă (ROU) |
| 12 December 2009; 15:00 | 3× (yellow card) 1× (suspension) | Report | 3× (yellow card) 3× (suspension) 1× (red card) | Wuxi Sport Center Gym, Wuxi; Attendance: 98; Referees: Florescu, Duţă (ROU) |

| 12 December 2009; 17:00 | Sweden | 49–18 | Thailand | Wuxi Sport Center Gym, Wuxi; Attendance: 150; Referees: Opava, Válek (CZE) |
| 12 December 2009; 17:00 | Skogsberg 12 | (19–8) | Suphasanan 6 | Wuxi Sport Center Gym, Wuxi; Attendance: 150; Referees: Opava, Válek (CZE) |
| 12 December 2009; 17:00 | 3× (yellow card) 1× (suspension) | Report | 3× (yellow card) 7× (suspension) | Wuxi Sport Center Gym, Wuxi; Attendance: 150; Referees: Opava, Válek (CZE) |

| 13 December 2009; 17:00 | Ukraine | 30–36 | Brazil | Wuxi Sport Center Gym, Wuxi; Attendance: 200; Referees: Beji, Farah (TUN) |
| 13 December 2009; 17:00 | Lyapina 6 | (20–20) | Pinheiro 10 | Wuxi Sport Center Gym, Wuxi; Attendance: 200; Referees: Beji, Farah (TUN) |
| 13 December 2009; 17:00 | 3× (yellow card) 5× (suspension) | Report | 3× (yellow card) 6× (suspension) | Wuxi Sport Center Gym, Wuxi; Attendance: 200; Referees: Beji, Farah (TUN) |

| 13 December 2009; 19:00 | Australia | 21–66 | Sweden | Wuxi Sport Center Gym, Wuxi; Attendance: 35; Referees: Florescu, Duţă (ROU) |
| 13 December 2009; 19:00 | Sørensen 6 | (8–26) | Boson 12 | Wuxi Sport Center Gym, Wuxi; Attendance: 35; Referees: Florescu, Duţă (ROU) |
| 13 December 2009; 19:00 | 3× (yellow card) 6× (suspension) | Report | 1× (yellow card) | Wuxi Sport Center Gym, Wuxi; Attendance: 35; Referees: Florescu, Duţă (ROU) |

| 13 December 2009; 15:00 | Thailand | 24–32 | Congo | Wuxi Sport Center Gym, Wuxi; Attendance: 25; Referees: Chen, Lu (CHN) |
| 13 December 2009; 15:00 | Thanawat 10 | (11–12) | Mavoungou 7 | Wuxi Sport Center Gym, Wuxi; Attendance: 25; Referees: Chen, Lu (CHN) |
| 13 December 2009; 15:00 | 3× (yellow card) 2× (suspension) | Report | 2× (yellow card) 4× (suspension) | Wuxi Sport Center Gym, Wuxi; Attendance: 25; Referees: Chen, Lu (CHN) |

| 14 December 2009; 15:00 | Congo | 33–22 | Australia | Wuxi Sport Center Gym, Wuxi; Attendance: 25; Referees: Chen S., Lu M. (CHN) |
| 14 December 2009; 15:00 | Okoko, Itoua Atsono 6 | (14–9) | Hudson-Gofers 7 | Wuxi Sport Center Gym, Wuxi; Attendance: 25; Referees: Chen S., Lu M. (CHN) |
| 14 December 2009; 15:00 | 3× (yellow card) 1× (suspension) | Report | 3× (yellow card) 3× (suspension) | Wuxi Sport Center Gym, Wuxi; Attendance: 25; Referees: Chen S., Lu M. (CHN) |

| 14 December 2009; 17:00 | Brazil | 44–19 | Thailand | Wuxi Sport Center Gym, Wuxi; Attendance: 200; Referees: Florescu, Duţă (ROU) |
| 14 December 2009; 17:00 | da Silva 8 | (27–9) | Suphasanan 6 | Wuxi Sport Center Gym, Wuxi; Attendance: 200; Referees: Florescu, Duţă (ROU) |
| 14 December 2009; 17:00 | 2× (yellow card) 1× (suspension) | Report | 3× (yellow card) 3× (suspension) | Wuxi Sport Center Gym, Wuxi; Attendance: 200; Referees: Florescu, Duţă (ROU) |

| 14 December 2009; 19:00 | Sweden | 34–31 | Ukraine | Wuxi Sport Center Gym, Wuxi; Attendance: 25; Referees: Opava, Válek (CZE) |
| 14 December 2009; 19:00 | Wikensten | (16–17) | Nikolayenko 10 | Wuxi Sport Center Gym, Wuxi; Attendance: 25; Referees: Opava, Válek (CZE) |
| 14 December 2009; 19:00 | 3× (yellow card) 3× (suspension) | Report | 4× (yellow card) 5× (suspension) | Wuxi Sport Center Gym, Wuxi; Attendance: 25; Referees: Opava, Válek (CZE) |

=== Group II ===
| Team | Pld | W | D | L | GF | GA | GD | Pts |
|---|---|---|---|---|---|---|---|---|
| Tunisia | 5 | 4 | 1 | 0 | 169 | 116 | +53 | 9 |
| Japan | 5 | 3 | 1 | 1 | 158 | 123 | +35 | 7 |
| Ivory Coast | 5 | 2 | 1 | 2 | 135 | 131 | +4 | 5 (Note: Ivory Coast 19–19 Argentina) |
| Argentina | 5 | 2 | 1 | 2 | 112 | 119 | −7 | 5 |
| Kazakhstan | 5 | 2 | 0 | 3 | 119 | 146 | −27 | 4 |
| Chile | 5 | 0 | 0 | 5 | 96 | 154 | −58 | 0 |

Source: IHF
Rules for classification: 1) points; 2) head-to-head points; 3) head-to-head goal difference; 4) head-to-head number of goals scored; 5) goal difference.
Notes:

| 12 December 2009; 19:00 | Tunisia | 32–22 | Argentina | Zhangjiagang Sports Center Gym, Zhangjiagang; Attendance: 100; Referees: Guseva, Vartanian (RUS) |
| 12 December 2009; 19:00 | Toumi 8 | (13–12) | Decilio 10 | Zhangjiagang Sports Center Gym, Zhangjiagang; Attendance: 100; Referees: Guseva, Vartanian (RUS) |
| 12 December 2009; 19:00 | 2× (yellow card) 2× (suspension) | Report | 3× (yellow card) 4× (suspension) 1× (red card) | Zhangjiagang Sports Center Gym, Zhangjiagang; Attendance: 100; Referees: Guseva, Vartanian (RUS) |

| 12 December 2009; 17:00 | Chile | 19–28 | Ivory Coast | Zhangjiagang Sports Center Gym, Zhangjiagang; Attendance: 100; Referees: Al Mutawa, Al Suwailan (KUW) |
| 12 December 2009; 17:00 | Feuchtmann 5 | (12–15) | Gondo-Bredou | Zhangjiagang Sports Center Gym, Zhangjiagang; Attendance: 100; Referees: Al Mutawa, Al Suwailan (KUW) |
| 12 December 2009; 17:00 | 3× (yellow card) 5× (suspension) 1× (red card) | Report | 3× (yellow card) 2× (suspension) | Zhangjiagang Sports Center Gym, Zhangjiagang; Attendance: 100; Referees: Al Mutawa, Al Suwailan (KUW) |

| 12 December 2009; 15:00 | Japan | 33–17 | Kazakhstan | Zhangjiagang Sports Center Gym, Zhangjiagang; Attendance: 100; Referees: Līcis, Stoļarovs (LAT) |
| 12 December 2009; 15:00 | Fujii 9 | (15–11) | Kozlova 5 | Zhangjiagang Sports Center Gym, Zhangjiagang; Attendance: 100; Referees: Līcis, Stoļarovs (LAT) |
| 12 December 2009; 15:00 | 3× (yellow card) 1× (suspension) | Report | 3× (yellow card) 1× (suspension) | Zhangjiagang Sports Center Gym, Zhangjiagang; Attendance: 100; Referees: Līcis, Stoļarovs (LAT) |

| 13 December 2009; 15:00 | Ivory Coast | 27–39 | Tunisia | Zhangjiagang Sports Center Gym, Zhangjiagang; Attendance: 100; Referees: Līcis, Stoļarovs (LAT) |
| 13 December 2009; 15:00 | Gondo-Bredou 10 | (16–14) | Chebbah 10 | Zhangjiagang Sports Center Gym, Zhangjiagang; Attendance: 100; Referees: Līcis, Stoļarovs (LAT) |
| 13 December 2009; 15:00 | 4× (yellow card) 1× (suspension) 1× (red card) | Report | 3× (yellow card) 2× (suspension) | Zhangjiagang Sports Center Gym, Zhangjiagang; Attendance: 100; Referees: Līcis, Stoļarovs (LAT) |

| 13 December 2009; 19:00 | Argentina | 25–24 | Japan | Zhangjiagang Sports Center Gym, Zhangjiagang; Attendance: 100; Referees: Liu S., Liu F. (CHN) |
| 13 December 2009; 19:00 | Decilio 6 | (15–12) | Fujii 8 | Zhangjiagang Sports Center Gym, Zhangjiagang; Attendance: 100; Referees: Liu S., Liu F. (CHN) |
| 13 December 2009; 19:00 | 3× (yellow card) 2× (suspension) | Report | 4× (yellow card) 2× (suspension) | Zhangjiagang Sports Center Gym, Zhangjiagang; Attendance: 100; Referees: Liu S., Liu F. (CHN) |

| 13 December 2009; 17:00 | Kazakhstan | 32–26 | Chile | Zhangjiagang Sports Center Gym, Zhangjiagang; Attendance: 100; Referees: Guseva, Vartanian (RUS) |
| 13 December 2009; 17:00 | Kubrina 7 | (18–18) | Flores 8 | Zhangjiagang Sports Center Gym, Zhangjiagang; Attendance: 100; Referees: Guseva, Vartanian (RUS) |
| 13 December 2009; 17:00 | 2× (yellow card) 2× (suspension) | Report | 3× (yellow card) 1× (suspension) | Zhangjiagang Sports Center Gym, Zhangjiagang; Attendance: 100; Referees: Guseva, Vartanian (RUS) |

| 14 December 2009; 19:00 | Chile | 16–22 | Argentina | Zhangjiagang Sports Center Gym, Zhangjiagang; Attendance: 100; Referees: Al Mutawa, Al Suwailam (KUW) |
| 14 December 2009; 19:00 | Letelier 4 | (7–10) | Criveli, Bianchi 4 | Zhangjiagang Sports Center Gym, Zhangjiagang; Attendance: 100; Referees: Al Mutawa, Al Suwailam (KUW) |
| 14 December 2009; 19:00 | 3× (yellow card) 4× (suspension) | Report | 3× (yellow card) 7× (suspension) | Zhangjiagang Sports Center Gym, Zhangjiagang; Attendance: 100; Referees: Al Mutawa, Al Suwailam (KUW) |

| 14 December 2009; 17:00 | Tunisia | 33–20 | Kazakhstan | Zhangjiagang Sports Center Gym, Zhangjiagang; Attendance: 100; Referees: Liu S., Liu F. (CHN) |
| 14 December 2009; 17:00 | Chebbah 10 | (15–10) | Suyazova 4 | Zhangjiagang Sports Center Gym, Zhangjiagang; Attendance: 100; Referees: Liu S., Liu F. (CHN) |
| 14 December 2009; 17:00 | 3× (yellow card) 1× (suspension) | Report | 3× (yellow card) | Zhangjiagang Sports Center Gym, Zhangjiagang; Attendance: 100; Referees: Liu S., Liu F. (CHN) |

| 14 December 2009; 15:00 | Japan | 32–31 | Ivory Coast | Zhangjiagang Sports Center Gym, Zhangjiagang; Attendance: 100; Referees: Guseva, Vartanian (RUS) |
| 14 December 2009; 15:00 | Takahashi, Kamimachi, Uegaki, Fujii 5 | (16–11) | Gondo-Bredou 14 | Zhangjiagang Sports Center Gym, Zhangjiagang; Attendance: 100; Referees: Guseva, Vartanian (RUS) |
| 14 December 2009; 15:00 | 3× (yellow card) 3× (suspension) | Report | 3× (yellow card) 5× (suspension) | Zhangjiagang Sports Center Gym, Zhangjiagang; Attendance: 100; Referees: Guseva, Vartanian (RUS) |

=== 23rd place game ===
| 15 December 2009; 16:30 | Australia | 21–32 | Chile | Wuxi Sports Center Gym, Wuxi; Attendance: 43; Referees: Opava, Válek (CZE) |
| 15 December 2009; 16:30 | Sørensen 4 | (6–14) | Musalem 8 | Wuxi Sports Center Gym, Wuxi; Attendance: 43; Referees: Opava, Válek (CZE) |
| 15 December 2009; 16:30 | 3× (yellow card) 2× (suspension) | Report | 4× (yellow card) 3× (suspension) | Wuxi Sports Center Gym, Wuxi; Attendance: 43; Referees: Opava, Válek (CZE) |

=== 21st place game ===
| 15 December 2009; 14:00 | Thailand | 27–23 | Kazakhstan | Wuxi Sports Center Gym, Wuxi; Attendance: 25; Referees: Chen S., Liu M. (CHN) |
| 15 December 2009; 14:00 | Thanawat 8 | (13–13) | Pikalova 6 | Wuxi Sports Center Gym, Wuxi; Attendance: 25; Referees: Chen S., Liu M. (CHN) |
| 15 December 2009; 14:00 | 2× (yellow card) 2× (suspension) | Report | 3× (yellow card) 2× (suspension) | Wuxi Sports Center Gym, Wuxi; Attendance: 25; Referees: Chen S., Liu M. (CHN) |

=== 19th place game ===
| 15 December 2009; 19:00 | Congo | 26–35 | Argentina | Wuxi Sports Center Gym, Wuxi; Attendance: 200; Referees: Beji, Farah (TUN) |
| 15 December 2009; 19:00 | Okoye Mbon 9 | (9–18) | Bianchi 11 | Wuxi Sports Center Gym, Wuxi; Attendance: 200; Referees: Beji, Farah (TUN) |
| 15 December 2009; 19:00 | 3× (yellow card) 5× (suspension) 1× (red card) | Report | 3× (yellow card) 8× (suspension) | Wuxi Sports Center Gym, Wuxi; Attendance: 200; Referees: Beji, Farah (TUN) |

=== 17th place game ===
| 15 December 2009; 14:00 | Ukraine | 34–29 | Ivory Coast | Zhangjiagang Sports Center Gym, Zhangjiagang; Attendance: 100; Referees: Liu S., Liu F. (CHN) |
| 15 December 2009; 14:00 | Nikolayenko 11 | (13–11) | Gondo-Bredou, Dosso 7 | Zhangjiagang Sports Center Gym, Zhangjiagang; Attendance: 100; Referees: Liu S., Liu F. (CHN) |
| 15 December 2009; 14:00 | 2× (yellow card) 2× (suspension) | Report | 4× (yellow card) 4× (suspension) | Zhangjiagang Sports Center Gym, Zhangjiagang; Attendance: 100; Referees: Liu S., Liu F. (CHN) |

=== 15th place game ===
| 15 December 2009; 16:30 | Brazil | 31–29 | Japan | Zhangjiagang Sports Center Gym, Zhangjiagang; Attendance: 100; Referees: Līcis, Stoļarovs (LAT) |
| 15 December 2009; 16:30 | Lima 6 | (19–17) | Fujii 9 | Zhangjiagang Sports Center Gym, Zhangjiagang; Attendance: 100; Referees: Līcis, Stoļarovs (LAT) |
| 15 December 2009; 16:30 | 4× (yellow card) 3× (suspension) | Report | 3× (yellow card) 4× (suspension) | Zhangjiagang Sports Center Gym, Zhangjiagang; Attendance: 100; Referees: Līcis, Stoļarovs (LAT) |

=== 13th place game ===
15 December 2009
19:00
Sweden
33–31 (ET)
Tunisia
Zhangjiagang Sports Center Gym, Zhangjiagang
Attendance: 100
Referees: Al-Mutawa, Al-Suwailam (KUW)
Gullden 8
(12–10)
Toumi 9
3× (yellow card) 2× (suspension)
Report
3× (yellow card) 2× (suspension)

FT: 26–26 ET: 7–5

=== 11th place game ===
| 17 December 2009; 16:00 | Angola | 26–25 | China | Suzhou Sports Center Gym, Suzhou; Attendance: 500; Referees: Guseva, Vartanian (RUS) |
| 17 December 2009; 16:00 | Azenaide 8 | (14–14) | Li W. 6 | Suzhou Sports Center Gym, Suzhou; Attendance: 500; Referees: Guseva, Vartanian (RUS) |
| 17 December 2009; 16:00 | 4× (yellow card) 1× (suspension) | Report | 3× (suspension) | Suzhou Sports Center Gym, Suzhou; Attendance: 500; Referees: Guseva, Vartanian (RUS) |

=== 9th place game ===
| 17 December 2009; 13:30 | Austria | 25–41 | Hungary | Suzhou Sports Center Gym, Suzhou; Attendance: 200; Referees: Florescu, Duţă (ROU) |
| 17 December 2009; 13:30 | Engel, Spiridon 7 | (15–17) | Tóth | Suzhou Sports Center Gym, Suzhou; Attendance: 200; Referees: Florescu, Duţă (ROU) |
| 17 December 2009; 13:30 | 3× (yellow card) 2× (suspension) | Report | 3× (yellow card) 1× (suspension) | Suzhou Sports Center Gym, Suzhou; Attendance: 200; Referees: Florescu, Duţă (ROU) |

=== 7th place game ===
| 17 December 2009; 18:30 | Germany | 35–25 | Romania | Suzhou Sports Center Gym, Suzhou; Attendance: 500; Referees: Bonaventura C., Bonaventura J. (FRA) |
| 17 December 2009; 18:30 | Althaus 6 | (20–13) | Amariei 7 | Suzhou Sports Center Gym, Suzhou; Attendance: 500; Referees: Bonaventura C., Bonaventura J. (FRA) |
| 17 December 2009; 18:30 | 3× (yellow card) 3× (suspension) | Report | 2× (yellow card) 1× (suspension) | Suzhou Sports Center Gym, Suzhou; Attendance: 500; Referees: Bonaventura C., Bonaventura J. (FRA) |

=== 5th place game ===
| 17 December 2009; 21:00 | Denmark | 33–31 | South Korea | Suzhou Sports Center Gym, Suzhou; Attendance: 500; Referees: Opava, Válek (CZE) |
| 17 December 2009; 21:00 | Augustesen 10 | (20–15) | Kim O. 9 | Suzhou Sports Center Gym, Suzhou; Attendance: 500; Referees: Opava, Válek (CZE) |
| 17 December 2009; 21:00 | 3× (yellow card) 3× (suspension) | Report | 2× (yellow card) 1× (suspension) | Suzhou Sports Center Gym, Suzhou; Attendance: 500; Referees: Opava, Válek (CZE) |

== Final round ==
=== Semifinals ===
| 18 December 2009; 18:30 | France | 27–23 | Spain | Nanjing Olympic Sports Center Gymnasium, Nanjing; Attendance: 6,000; Referees: Gatelis, Mažeika (LTU) |
| 18 December 2009; 18:30 | Ayglon, Signaté 5 | (12–10) | Mangué 9 | Nanjing Olympic Sports Center Gymnasium, Nanjing; Attendance: 6,000; Referees: Gatelis, Mažeika (LTU) |
| 18 December 2009; 18:30 | 4× (yellow card) 6× (suspension) | Report | | Nanjing Olympic Sports Center Gymnasium, Nanjing; Attendance: 6,000; Referees: Gatelis, Mažeika (LTU) |

| 18 December 2009; 21:15 | Norway | 20–28 | Russia | Nanjing Olympic Sports Center Gymnasium, Nanjing; Attendance: 6,500; Referees: Geipel, Helbig (GER) |
| 18 December 2009; 21:15 | Frafjord, Riegelhuth 4 | (12–17) | Postnova 6 | Nanjing Olympic Sports Center Gymnasium, Nanjing; Attendance: 6,500; Referees: Geipel, Helbig (GER) |
| 18 December 2009; 21:15 | 2× (yellow card) | Report | 3× (yellow card) 4× (suspension) | Nanjing Olympic Sports Center Gymnasium, Nanjing; Attendance: 6,500; Referees: Geipel, Helbig (GER) |

=== Bronze medal game ===
| 20 December 2009; 16:30 | Spain | 26–31 | Norway | Nanjing Olympic Sports Center Gymnasium, Nanjing; Attendance: 10,000; Referees: Marina, Minore (ARG) |
| 20 December 2009; 16:30 | Alberto, Mangué, Aguilar 5 | (9–15) | Frafjord 7 | Nanjing Olympic Sports Center Gymnasium, Nanjing; Attendance: 10,000; Referees: Marina, Minore (ARG) |
| 20 December 2009; 16:30 | 3× (yellow card) 6× (suspension) | Report | 3× (yellow card) 7× (suspension) | Nanjing Olympic Sports Center Gymnasium, Nanjing; Attendance: 10,000; Referees: Marina, Minore (ARG) |

=== Final ===
| 20 December 2009; 19:00 | France | 22–25 | Russia | Nanjing Olympic Sports Center Gymnasium, Nanjing; Attendance: 13,000; Referees: Gjeding, Hansen (DEN) |
| 20 December 2009; 19:00 | Signaté 8 | (11–14) | Dmitriyeva 8 | Nanjing Olympic Sports Center Gymnasium, Nanjing; Attendance: 13,000; Referees: Gjeding, Hansen (DEN) |
| 20 December 2009; 19:00 | 4× (yellow card) 3× (suspension) | Report | 2× (yellow card) 5× (suspension) | Nanjing Olympic Sports Center Gymnasium, Nanjing; Attendance: 13,000; Referees: Gjeding, Hansen (DEN) |

== Ranking and statistics ==
=== Final ranking ===
| Rank | Team |
|---|---|
| Gold medal | Russia |
| Silver medal | France |
| Bronze medal | Norway |
| 4 | Spain |
| 5 | Denmark |
| 6 | South Korea |
| 7 | Germany |
| 8 | Romania |
| 9 | Hungary |
| 10 | Austria |
| 11 | Angola |
| 12 | China |
| 13 | Sweden |
| 14 | Tunisia |
| 15 | Brazil |
| 16 | Japan |
| 17 | Ukraine |
| 18 | Ivory Coast |
| 19 | Argentina |
| 20 | Congo |
| 21 | Thailand |
| 22 | Kazakhstan |
| 23 | Chile |
| 24 | Australia |

2009 Women's World Champions

Russia
Fourth title

Team roster: Inna Suslina, Lyudmila Postnova, Tatiana Dronina, Yelena Dmitriyeva, Olga Levina,
Marina Yartseva, Ksenia Makeeva, Maya Petrova, Anna Sedoykina, Yekaterina Andryushina, Nadezhda Muravyeva, Ekaterina Vetkova, Victoria Zhilinskayte, Oxana Koroleva, Emiliya Turey and Tatiana Khmyrova.
Head coach: Evgeny Trefilov.

=== All Star Team ===
- Goalkeeper: Inna Suslina (RUS)
- Left wing: Camilla Herrem (NOR)
- Left back: Mariama Signaté (FRA)
- Pivot: Begoña Fernández (ESP)
- Centre back: Allison Pineau (FRA)
- Right back: Marta Mangué (ESP)
- Right wing: Linn-Kristin Riegelhuth (NOR)

Chosen by team officials and IHF experts: IHF.info

=== Top goalscorers ===
| Rank | Name | Team | Goals | Shots | % |
|---|---|---|---|---|---|
| 1 | Katrin Engel | Austria | 67 | 112 | 60% |
| 2 | Paula Gondo-Bredou | Ivory Coast | 65 | 95 | 68% |
| 3 | Shio Fujii | Japan | 61 | 109 | 56% |
| 4 | Mouna Chebbah | Tunisia | 58 | 113 | 51% |
| 5 | Kim On-A | South Korea | 53 | 89 | 60% |
| 5 | Olha Nikolayenko | Ukraine | 53 | 98 | 54% |
| 7 | N'Cho Elodie Mambo | Ivory Coast | 52 | 98 | 53% |
| 7 | Elzira Tavares | Angola | 52 | 82 | 63% |
| 9 | Linn-Kristin Riegelhuth | Norway | 50 | 80 | 63% |
| 10 | Chantal Okoye Mbon | Congo | 48 | 70 | 69% |
| 10 | Akie Uegaki | Japan | 48 | 107 | 45% |

Source: IHF.info

=== Top goalkeepers ===
| Rank | Name | Team | % | Saves | Shots |
|---|---|---|---|---|---|
| 1 | Odeth Tavares | Angola | 45% | 31 | 69 |
| 2 | Anna Sedoykina | Russia | 44% | 63 | 142 |
| 3 | Mihaela Ciobanu | Spain | 42% | 84 | 202 |
| 4 | Tetyana Chukhno | Ukraine | 41% | 39 | 96 |
| 4 | Paula Ungureanu | Romania | 41% | 101 | 246 |
| 6 | Cléopatre Darleux | France | 40% | 49 | 122 |
| 6 | Darly de Paula | Brazil | 40% | 49 | 124 |
| 6 | Cristina González | Spain | 40% | 65 | 162 |
| 6 | Natascha Schilk | Austria | 40% | 55 | 136 |
| 6 | Inna Suslina | Russia | 40% | 73 | 181 |

Source: IHF.info

=== Other awards ===
- Most Valuable Player: Lyudmila Postnova (RUS)

Chosen by team officials and IHF experts: IHF.info
