= Msaad =

Msaad, M. Saad, Mesaaed, or Messaed is a given name or surname shared by several notable people, including:

== Msaad ==
- Hela Msaad, Tunisian handball player
- Mohammed Msaad (born 2004), Moroccan steeplechase runner

== M. Saad ==
- Hasballah M. Saad, Indonesian politician

== Messaed ==
- Salem Messaêd El-Ahmadi, Saudi Arabian triple jumper

== See also ==
- Saad
