= Dronin =

Dronin (Russian: Дронин) is a Russian masculine surname, its feminine counterpart is Dronina. It may refer to

- Jurgita Dronina (born 1986), Russian-Lithuanian ballet dancer
- Roman Dronin (born 1983), Uzbekistani cyclist
- Tatyana Dronina (born 1978), Russian handball player

== See also ==
- Bustin' + Dronin', a remix album by the band Blur
