= Karamoko =

Karamoko or Karamokho is a political and religious function that was often given in countries such as Guinea, Senegal, Mali

== Given name ==
- Karamokho Alfa (died c. 1751), Guinean religious leader
- Karamoko Cissé (born 1988), Guinean football forward
- Karamoko Dembele (born 2003), Great Britain-Ivorian football winger
- Karamoko Kéïta (born 1974), Malian football goalkeeper

Surname

- Awa Karamoko (born 1985), Côte d'Ivoire handball player
- Benjamin Karamoko (born 1995), Ivorian football defender
- Hamadou Karamoko (born 1995), French football defender
- Vasseko Karamoko (born 1987), French footballer
- Aboubakar Karamoko (born 1999), Ivorian footballer
- Mamoudou Karamoko (born 1999), French footballer
- Sankara Karamoko (born 2003), Ivorian footballer
