= Paula Gondo-Bredou =

Ivorian handball player

Paula Gondo-Bredou (born 10 December 1981) is an Ivorian handball player who is playing for Toulon St-Cyr Var Handball and the Côte d'Ivoire women's national handball team. She was listed as number two among the top goalscorers at the 2009 World Women's Handball Championship in China, with 65 goals.
