= Mariama Signaté =

French handball player (born 1985)

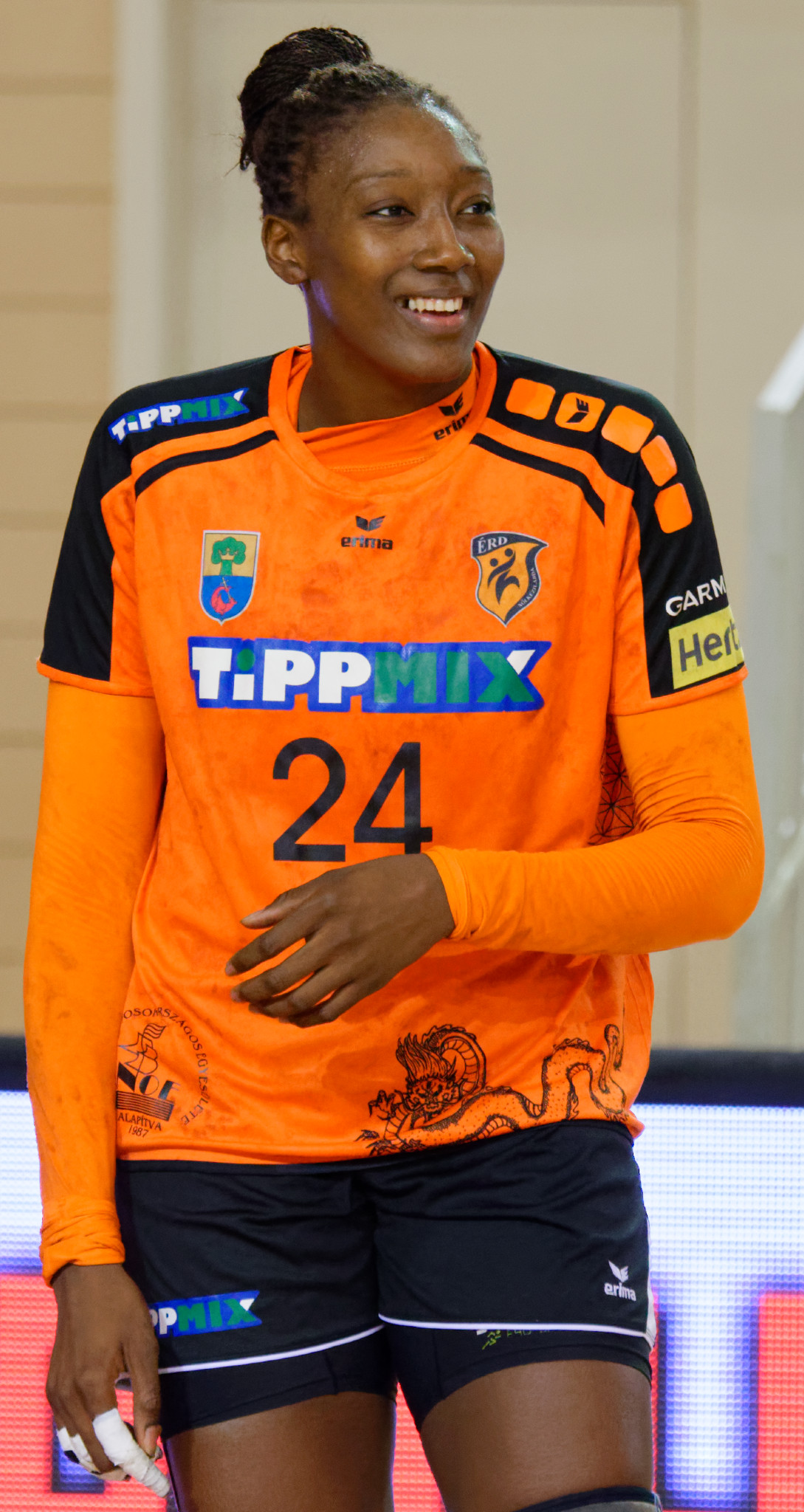
- Nov. 18, 2017

Personal information
- Full name: Mariama Camara Signaté
- Nationality: French
- Born: 22 July 1985 (age 41) Dakar, Senegal
- Height: 1.89 m (6 ft 2 in)

Sport
- Sport: Handball
- Position: Left back
- Number: 24

Youth career
- Years: Team
- 1990–2003: Toulon St-Cyr Var HB

Senior clubs
- Years: Team
- 2003–2005: HAC Handball
- 2005–2008: Fleury Loiret HB
- 2008–2010: HBC Nîmes
- 2010–2011: Aalborg DH
- 2011–2014: Issy-Paris Hand
- 2014–2018: Érdi VSE
- 2018–2019: Chambray Touraine HB
National team
Years	Team	Apps	(Gls)
2004–2012	France	147	(406)
Medal record
Representing France
World Championship
Silver medal – second place	2009 China	Team
Silver medal – second place	2011 Brazil	Team
Mediterranean Games
Gold medal – first place	2009 Pescara	Team

Mariama Camara Signaté (born 22 July 1985 in Dakar, Senegal) is a French former handball player. Her playing position was left back.

== Career ==
=== Club ===
Signaté's former clubs include Toulon, where she played from 1990 to 2003, Le Havre, of which she was part from 2003 to 2005, and Fleury les Aubrais (2005–2008).

In 2008, she switched to HBC Nîmes, with whom she reached the final of the French League Cup in her first season. A year later won the 2008–2009 edition of the EHF Challenge Cup ahead of German club Thüringer HC. In the summer 2010 she transferred to Danish side Aalborg DH, just to return to France a year later, joining Issy-Paris Hand. During her time in Issy-Paris, Signaté reached the finals of the EHF Cup Winners' Cup and the EHF Challenge Cup, falling short in both occasions to Hypo Niederösterreich (2013) and H 65 Höör (2014), respectively.

After three seasons in Issy-Paris, Signate decided to join Hungarian top division side Érd. She claimed that one of the main reasons in her decision to move to Érd was the figure of Edina Szabó – head coach of Érd and technical director of the French national team – with whom she had been working successfully for a long time. Szabó handled the stewardship of the French national team. In September 2018 she had to leave, because of an argument with her coach. Szabó started harassing her when she realized that the club was facing serious financial difficulties. Signaté ended up resigning on September 13 on the bad advice of her former lawyer Kristóf Wenczel. After her resignation, the club of Érd tried to block her international transfer during months but thanks to the help of the French Federation, Signaté could sign a contract with Chambray Touraine HB and she spent the rest of the season there before retiring.

At the beginning of the following season the club of Érd had to fire the entire staff and all their professional players due to financial issues.

=== International ===
Signaté made her debut in the French national team in October 2004, in a match in Germany against the Norwegian team. In December 2004 she participated at the 2004 European Women's Handball Championship in Hungary, where the French team placed 11th. In 2004, she also achieved a 4th place representing France at the European Junior Championship in the Czech Republic. In 2005, she participated at the Mediterranean Games in Almería, placing 4th with the French team. She participated at the 2007 World Women's Handball Championship in France, where France finished 5th. She represented France at the 2008 Summer Olympic Games in Beijing, where France finished 5th. In 2009, she won a gold medal at the Mediterranean Games in Italy. She participated at the 2009 World Women's Handball Championship in China, where the French team won the silver medal behind Russia, and Signate was selected into the All-Star team as the best left back of the tournament.

== Honors ==
- EHF Challenge Cup:
  - Winner: 2009
  - Runner-up: 2014
- EHF Cup Winners' Cup:
  - Runner-up: 2013

== Awards ==
- All-Star Left Back of the World Championship: 2009
