= Golungo Alto =

- Municipality and town
- Location in Angola
- Coordinates: 9°8′S 14°46′E
- Country: Angola
- Province: Cuanza Norte Province

Population (2014 Census)
  - Municipality and town: 33,834
  - Urban: 19,992
- Time zone: UTC+1 (WAT)
- Climate: Aw

Golungo Alto is a town and municipality in Cuanza Norte Province in Angola. The municipality had a population of 33,834 in 2014.

The writer Rosária da Silva was born in Golungo Alto in 1959.

Football coach José Morais was also born in Golungo Alto in 1965.
