= Katrin Engel =

Austrian handball player (born 1984)

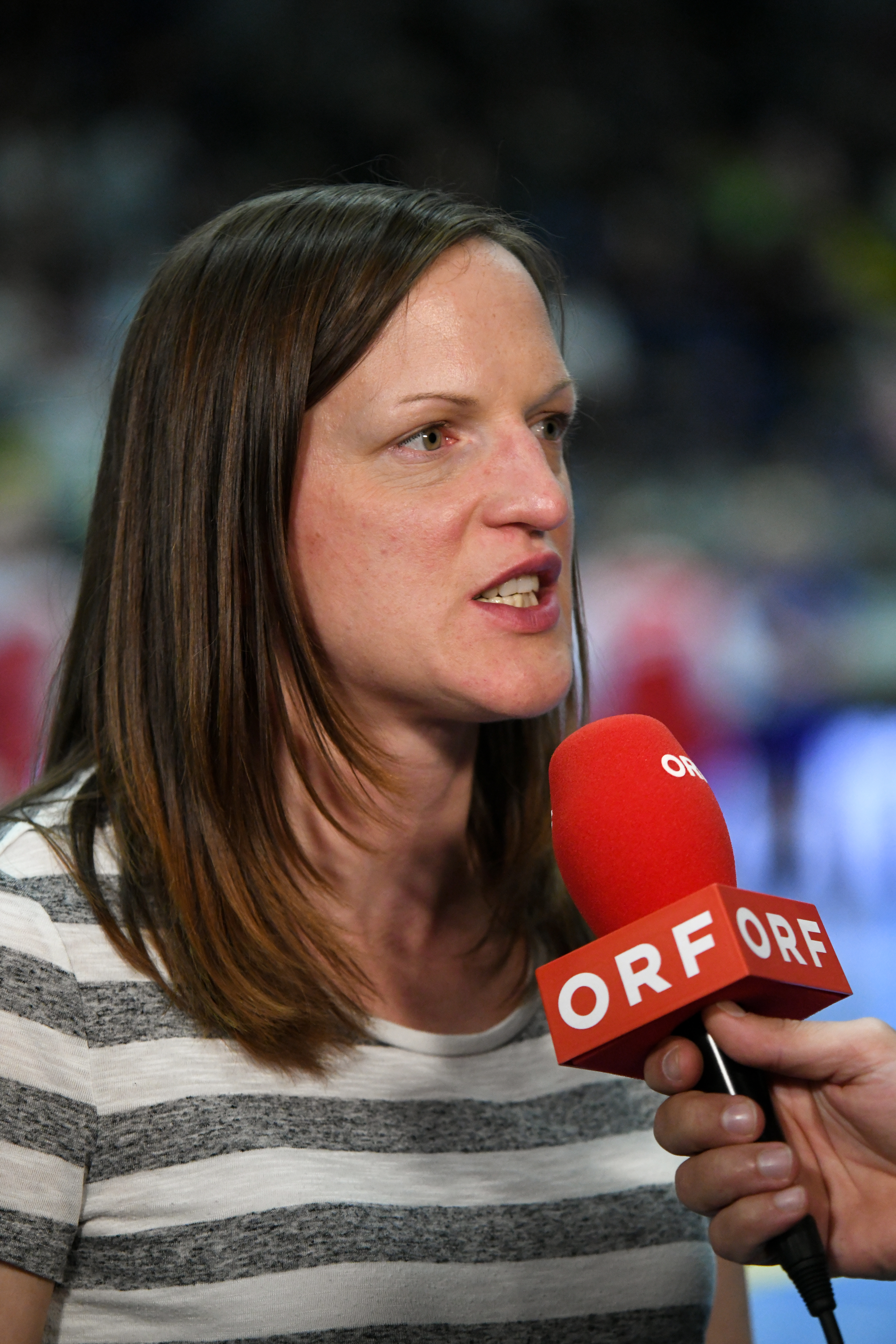

Personal information
- Full name: Katrin Engel
- Nationality: Austrian
- Born: 2 May 1984 (age 42) Mistelbach, Austria
- Height: 1.72 m (5 ft 8 in)

Sport
- Sport: Handball
- Position: Right Back/Wing
- Current club: Retired
- Number: 19

Senior clubs
- Years: Team
- 2001–2005: Hypo Niederösterreich
- 2005–2007: 1. FC Nürnberg
- 2007–2008: Hypo Niederösterreich
- 2008–2009: 1. FC Nürnberg
- 2009–2011: TSV Bayer Leverkusen
- 2011–2017: Thüringer HC
National team
Years	Team	Apps	(Gls)
2000-?	Austria	138	(444)

Katrin Engel (born 2 May 1984, in Mistelbach) is an Austrian handballer playing for Thüringer HC and the Austrian national team. She was the 2009 World Women's Handball Championship topscorer with 67 goals.

== Achievements ==
- Women Handball Austria:
  - Winner: 2002, 2003, 2004, 2005, 2008
- ÖHB Cup:
  - Winner: 2002, 2003, 2004, 2005, 2008
- Bundesliga:
  - Winner: 2007, 2011, 2012, 2013, 2014
- German Cup:
  - Winner: 2010, 2011
- EHF Champions League:
  - Finalist: 2008
