= Macarena Aguilar =

Spanish handball player (born 1985)

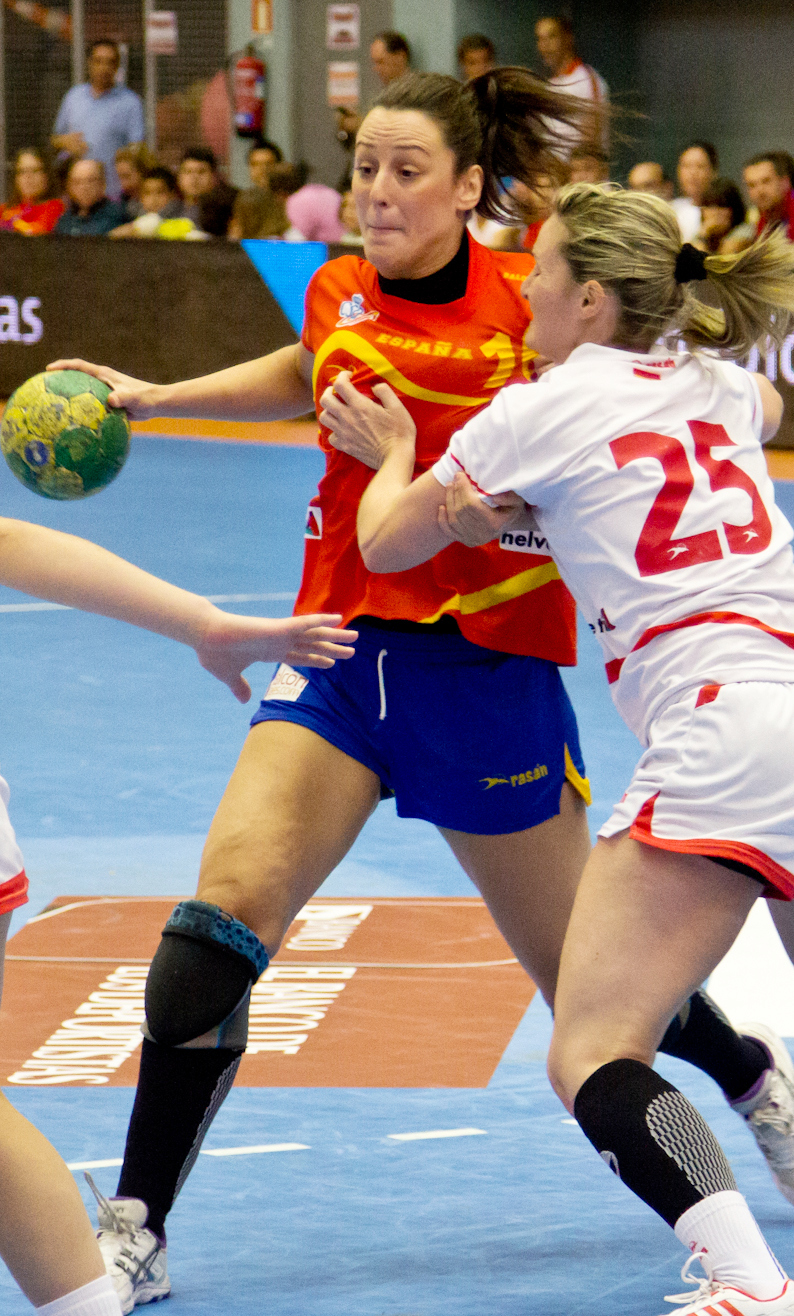
- Aguilar in 2013

Personal information
- Full name: Macarena Aguilar Díaz
- Nationality: Spanish
- Born: 12 March 1985 (age 41) Bolaños de Calatrava, Spain
- Height: 1.70 m (5 ft 7 in)

Sport
- Sport: Handball
- Position: Centre back

Senior clubs
- Years: Team
- 2001–2009: Sagunto
- 2009–2012: SD Itxako
- 2012–2014: Randers HK
- 2014–2015: Győri ETO KC
- 2015: Rostov-Don
- 2015–2016: Siófok KC
- 2016–2018: Thüringer HC
National team
Years	Team	Apps	(Gls)
2004–2017	Spain	240	(638)
Medal record
Olympic Games
Bronze medal – third place	2012 London	Team
World Championship
Bronze medal – third place	2011 Brazil
European Championship
Silver medal – second place	2008 Macedonia
Silver medal – second place	2014 Croatia/Hungary
Mediterranean Games
Gold medal – first place	2005 Almería	Team

Macarena Aguilar Díaz (Note: In this Spanish name, the first or paternal surname is Aguilar and the second or maternal family name is Díaz.) (born 12 March 1985) is a Spanish former handball player who played for the Spanish national team.

== Club career ==
Aguilar started her senior career at Balonmano Sagunto, where she stayed for eight years. With Sagunto, she won every domestic competition: the Spanish Championship, Spanish League Cup, Queen's Cup (Spanish: Copa de la Reina) and Spanish Supercup. In July 2009, she moved to Estella to play for Itxako. Here she won the 2010, 2011 and 2012 Spanish championship.

She then joined Danish team Randers HK. In 2014 she joined Hungarian Győri ETO KC. Here she won the 2015 Hungarian cup. In the summer of 2015 she joined Russian Rostov-Don, but immediately returned to Hungary a month later in September and joined Siófok KC.

From 2016 to 2018, she played for the German team Thüringer HC. Here she won the 2018 German championship. Afterwards she retired from handball.

== National team ==
Aguilar won a gold medal with the Spanish national team at the 2005 Mediterranean Games in Almería. She won silver medals at the 2008 European Championship, where the Spanish team reached the final after defeating Germany in the semifinal, and the 2014 European Championship, where the team was defeated by Norway in the final.

From 2004 to 2017, Aguilar played 240 matches and scored 638 goals for the national team. She competed at the 2011 World Women's Handball Championship in Brazil, where the Spanish team placed third. She was also part of the Spanish team that won bronze at the 2012 Summer Olympics and finished 4th at the 2009 World Women's Handball Championship.

== Injuries and awards ==
Aguilar broke her nose five times during her career. She missed nine months of competition in 2008 due to a knee injury, and fractured a metatarsal bone on her foot at the 2012 European Championships. In 2013, she received the Bronze Medal of the Royal Order of Sports Merit.
