= Elzira Tavares =

Angolan handball player

Elzira Barros
Personal information
- Full name: Elzira de Fátima Borges Tavares Barros
- Nationality: Angolan
- Born: 13 May 1980 (age 46) Benguela, Angola
- Height: 1.84 m (6 ft 0 in)

Sport
- Sport: Handball
- Position: Left Back
- Current club: Primeiro de Agosto
- Number: 21

Senior clubs
- Years: Team
- 1998-2000: Electro do Lobito
- 2000–2002: Académica do Lobito
- 2002-2004: G.D. ENANA
- 2004-2005: Primeiro de Agosto
- 2005-2006: ASA
- 2006-2012: Petro Atlético
- 2012-present: Primeiro de Agosto
National team
- Years: Team
- –: Angola
Medal record
African Championship
Gold medal – first place	Salé 2012	National Team
All-Africa Games
Gold medal – first place	Maputo 2011	National Team

Elzira de Fátima Borges Tavares Barros (born 13 May 1980 in Benguela), is a former Angolan handball player. Elzira represented Angola at the 2004 Summer Olympic Games in Athens, where Angola finished 9th. She also participated in the 2009 World Women's Handball Championship in Beijing. She participated at the 2011 World Women's Handball Championship in Brazil.

She is married to Angolan basketball player Mílton Barros.

She last played for Angolan side Primeiro de Agosto.
