= Changzhou Olympic Sports Centre =

Sports venue in Changzhou, China

Coordinates: 31°48′29″N 119°58′28″E

Changzhou Olympic Sports Centre Stadium
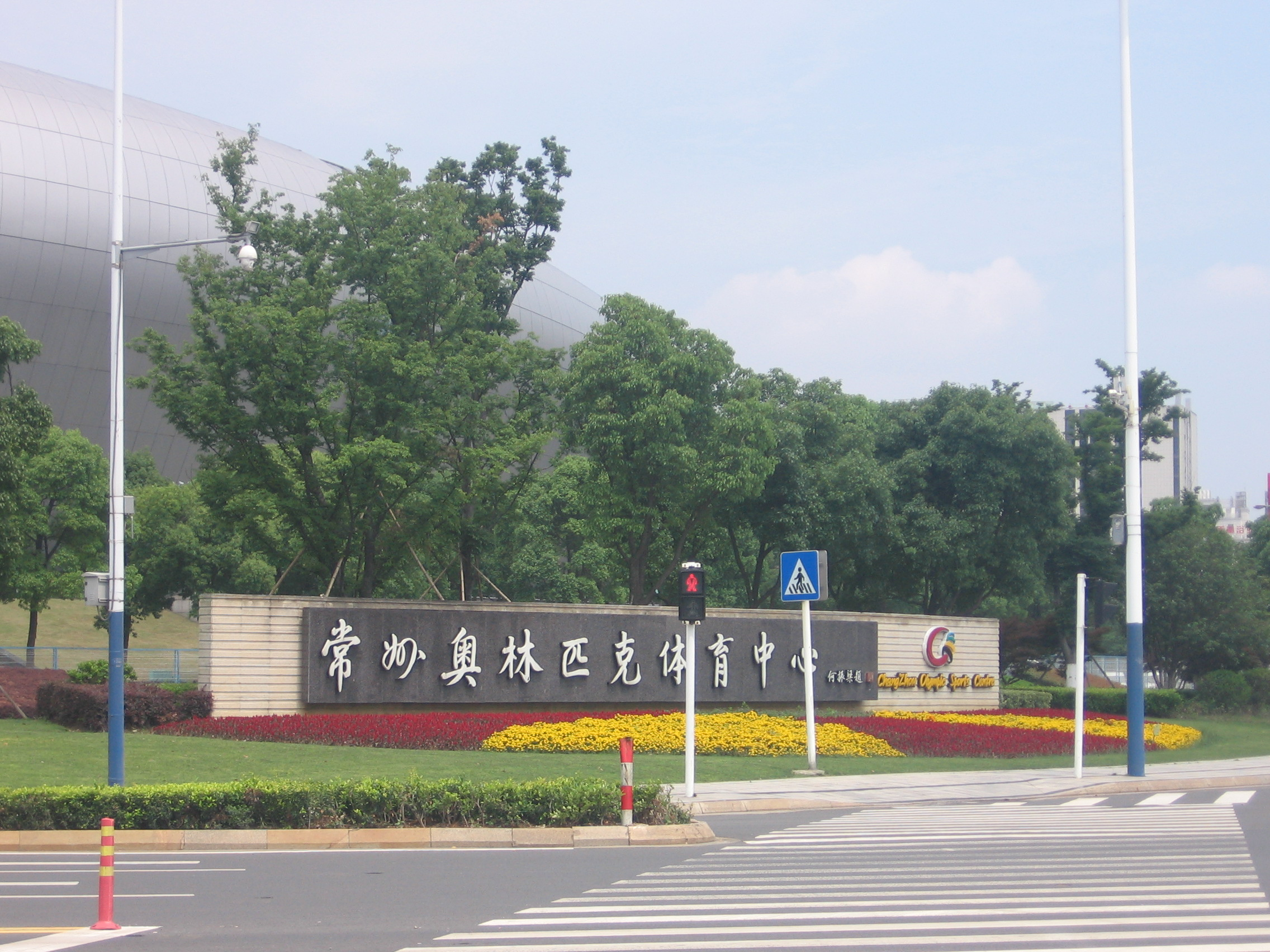
- Interactive map of Changzhou Olympic Sports Centre Stadium
- Location: Changzhou, China
- Owner: Changzhou Government
- Capacity: 38,000 (Stadium); 6,200 (Gymnasium)
- Surface: Grass

Construction
- Opened: 2008
- Cost: ? million RMB

Tenants
- Changzhou Tianshan; 2009 World Women's Handball Championship; China Masters

Changzhou Olympic Sports Centre (Simplified Chinese: 常州奥林匹克体育中心) is a sport complex in Changzhou, China. It is currently used mostly for various events, like concerts and athletics. The main stadium holds 38,000 people. The complex also includes the 6,200-seater Xincheng Gymnasium, an aquatic centre with 2,300 seats, and a 4,400 m^{2} indoor tennis hall. Association football club Changzhou Tianshan use the venue for home games.

== History ==
=== Construction and opening ===
The Changzhou Olympic Sports Center was constructed as the largest social事业project in Changzhou's history at the time. The entire complex, spanning 28.5 hectares with a total floor area of 200,000 square meters, officially opened in September 2008. The complex includes a stadium, gymnasium, swimming and diving center, convention center, and tennis hall.

=== Naming rights ===
In April 2009, the Jiangsu Xincheng Group acquired naming rights to the venue for a 10-year period, renaming it "Xincheng Stadium." The Xincheng name was removed from the venue's signage in July 2019.

== Design and facilities ==
The stadium features a standard football pitch and an IAAF-certified 400-meter running track. The facility has a seating capacity of 41,000, making it one of the larger stadiums in Jiangsu Province. The complex also includes a 6,200-seat gymnasium with basketball and table tennis facilities, a 2,300-seat swimming and diving center, a convention center with 1,000 exhibition booths, and a 4,400-square-meter indoor tennis hall.

== Events ==
=== Sports competitions ===
Since its opening, the stadium has hosted numerous international sporting events. It has been the venue for the China Badminton Masters on multiple occasions. The 2025 Victor China Badminton Open, a Super 1000 level tournament, was held at the venue in July 2025, attracting 315 athletes from 27 countries and regions.

The complex's swimming and diving center hosted the 17th FINA Diving World Cup in June 2010, which featured 350 athletes from 33 countries and regions. The venue also hosted the 17th Jiangsu Provincial Games.

=== Football matches ===
In 2025, the stadium became the home venue for the Changzhou football team in the Jiangsu Provincial City Football League. The team moved from Changzhou Institute of Technology Stadium to accommodate growing spectator demand, with the first match at the new venue held on June 21, 2025, against Nanjing.

The stadium recorded its highest attendance for a football match on July 20, 2025, when 40,253 spectators watched Changzhou face Xuzhou.
