= Emiliya Turey =

Russian handball player (born 1984)

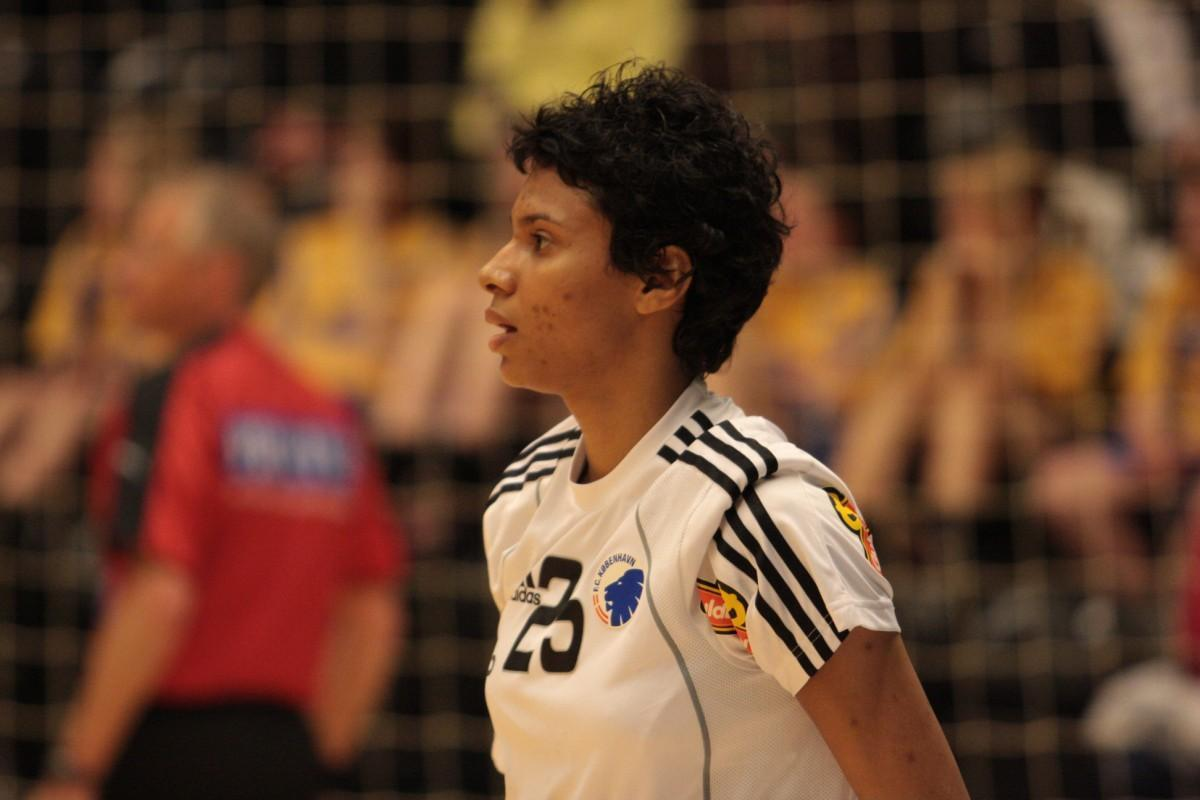
- Turey in 2009 during a match against FC Midtjylland

Personal information
- Full name: Emiliya Khalsberiyevna Turey
- Nationality: Russian
- Born: 6 October 1984 (age 42) Astrakhan, Russian SFSR, Soviet Union
- Height: 1.73 m (5 ft 8 in)

Sport
- Sport: Handball
- Position: Left Wing
- Current club: Retired

Senior clubs
- Years: Team
- –2005: Astrakhanochka
- 2005–2008: Slagelse DT
- 2008–2010: FCK Håndbold
- 2010–2011: SD Itxako
- 2011–2012: Rostov-Don
- 2012–2013: Astrakhanochka
- 2013–2014: CSM Bucharest
National team
Years	Team	Apps	(Gls)
–	Russia	180	(613)
Medal record
Olympic Games
Silver medal – second place	2008 Beijing	Team
World Championship
Gold medal – first place	2005 Russia	Team
Gold medal – first place	2007 France	Team
Gold medal – first place	2009 China	Team
European Championship
Silver medal – second place	2006 Sweden	Team
Bronze medal – third place	2008 Macedonia	Team
- Updated on 4 December 2012

Emiliya Khalsberiyevna Turey (Russian: Эмилия Халсбериевна Турей; born 6 October 1984 in Astrakhan) is a Russian former handballer who played as a left wing. She is a three-time World Champion (2005, 2007 & 2009), silver medalist of the 2008 Summer Olympics in Beijing and the 2006 European Championship, and bronze medalist of the 2008 European Championship, all with the National Team of Russia. She also won the EHF Champions League in 2007 and the EHF Cup Winners' Cup in 2009 as a club player. Turey is of Sierra Leonean descent through her father.

She competed at the 2011 World Women's Handball Championship in Brazil, where the Russian team placed 6th.

== Career ==
Turei started her career at her hometown club HC Astrakhanochka. In 2005 she joined Danish side Slagelse DT, where she won the 2007 EHF Champions League.

In 2008 she joined FCK Håndbold together with coach Anja Andersen and a handful of other players. Here she won the 2009 EHF Cup Winners' Cup and the 2010 Danish Cup.

In 2010 she left FCK, because she wanted more security regarding playing time. She then joined Spanish side SD Itxako, where she played for a single season, winning the Spanish championship. She then joined Russian Rostov-Don. A year later she returned to HC Astrakhanochka. After the 2012-13 she retired from handball. In December the same year she returned to the court and joined CSM Bucharest for the rest of the season.

From 2020 to 2022 she was the sporting director at HC Astrakhanochka.

== International honours ==
- EHF Champions League:
  - Winner: 2007
  - Finalist: 2011
- EHF Cup Winners' Cup:
  - Winner: 2009
- World Championship:
  - Gold Medalist: 2005, 2007, 2009
- European Championship:
  - Silver Medalist: 2006
  - Bronze Medalist: 2008
- Olympic Games:
  - Silver Medalist: 2008

== Individual awards ==
- All-Star Left Wing of the World Championship: 2011
