= Louise Mortensen =

Danish handballer (born 1979)

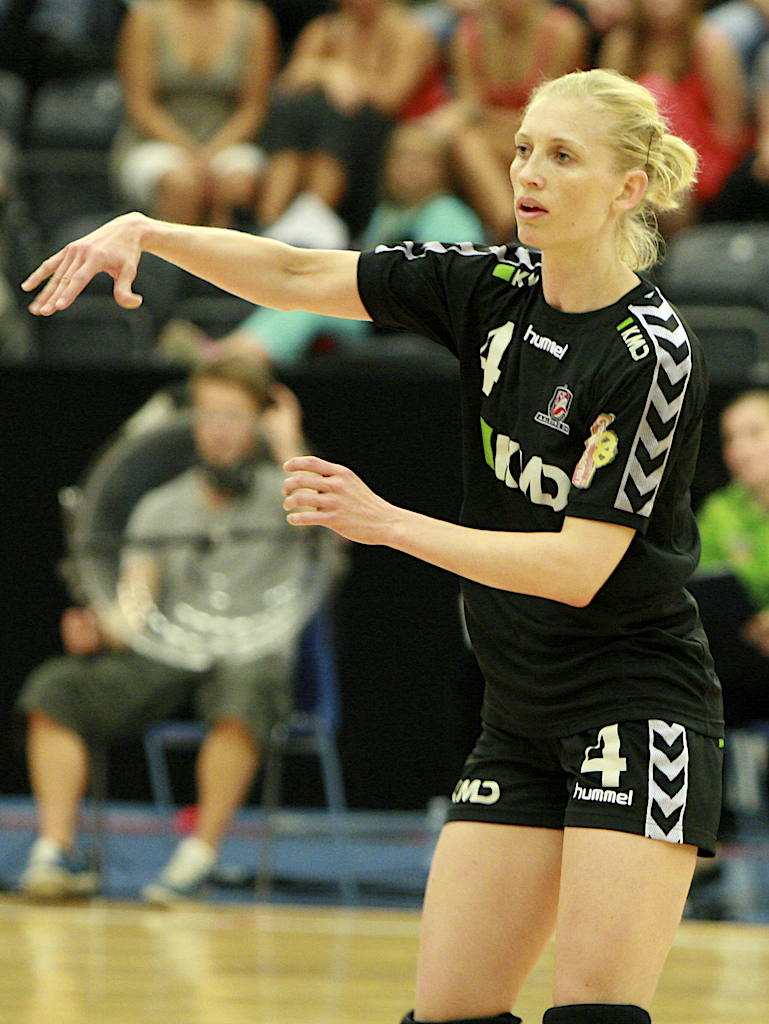

Personal information
- Nationality: Danish
- Born: December 11, 1979 (age 46) Aalborg, Denmark
- Height: 178 cm (70 in)

Sport
- Sport: Handball
- Position: Playmaker
- Current club: Retired

Senior clubs
- Years: Team
- 1999–2004: Team Esbjerg
- 2004–2009: Aalborg DH
- 2009–2010: Visse IF
- 2011–2012: Team Vesthimmerland
National team
| Years | Team | Apps | (Gls) |
| 2003–2009 | Denmark | 97 | (205) |

Louise Mortensen (born December 11, 1979) is a Danish former handballer.

The last club she played for was Aalborg DH and previously she played for Team Esbjerg. She participated in the World Championships in 2005 and 2009. She also played at the 2008 European Women's Handball Championship. She played 97 national games and scored 205 with the Danish national team.

She stopped her career by December 29, 2009.
