= Sabrina Richter =

German handball player (born 1982)

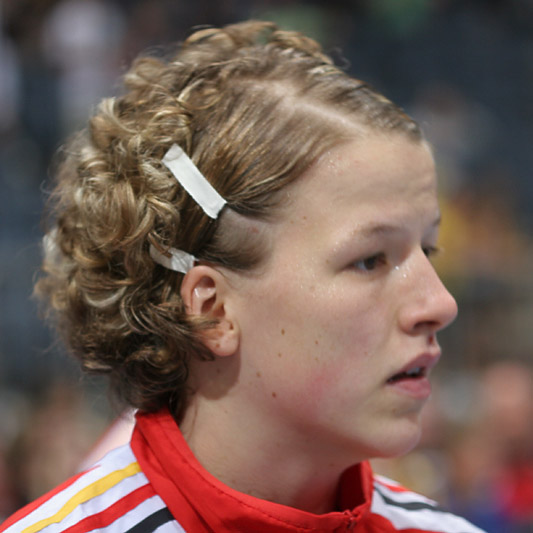
- Neukamp in July 2008 in a match against Angola

Personal information
- Nationality: German
- Born: 10 May 1982 (age 44) Hagen, Germany
- Height: 1.76 m (5 ft 9 in)

Sport
- Sport: Handball
- Position: Right Wing
- Current club: Retired

Youth career
- Years: Team
- –: TuS 03 Hagen

Senior clubs
- Years: Team
- -2001: Hasper SV
- 2001-2004: HSG Blomberg-Lippe
- 2004-2008: Bayer Leverkusen
- 2008-2012: HSG Blomberg-Lippe
- 2012-2014: SG TuRa/Halden
- 2014-2015: Borussia Dortmund Handball
National team
Years	Team	Apps	(Gls)
2002-2015	Germany	147	(347)

Teams managed
- 2021-: SG TuRa/Halden
- Updated on 5 February 2024

Sabrina Richter (née Neukamp; born 10 May 1982) is a German former handball player and handball coach. She played and for the German national team. She retired in 2015.

She represented Germany at the Beijing 2008 Summer Olympics, where Germany placed 11th. She participates at the 2009 World Women's Handball Championship in China.

In 2021 she became the coach of her former club SG TuRa/Halden.
