= Lyudmila Postnova =

Russian handball player (born 1984)

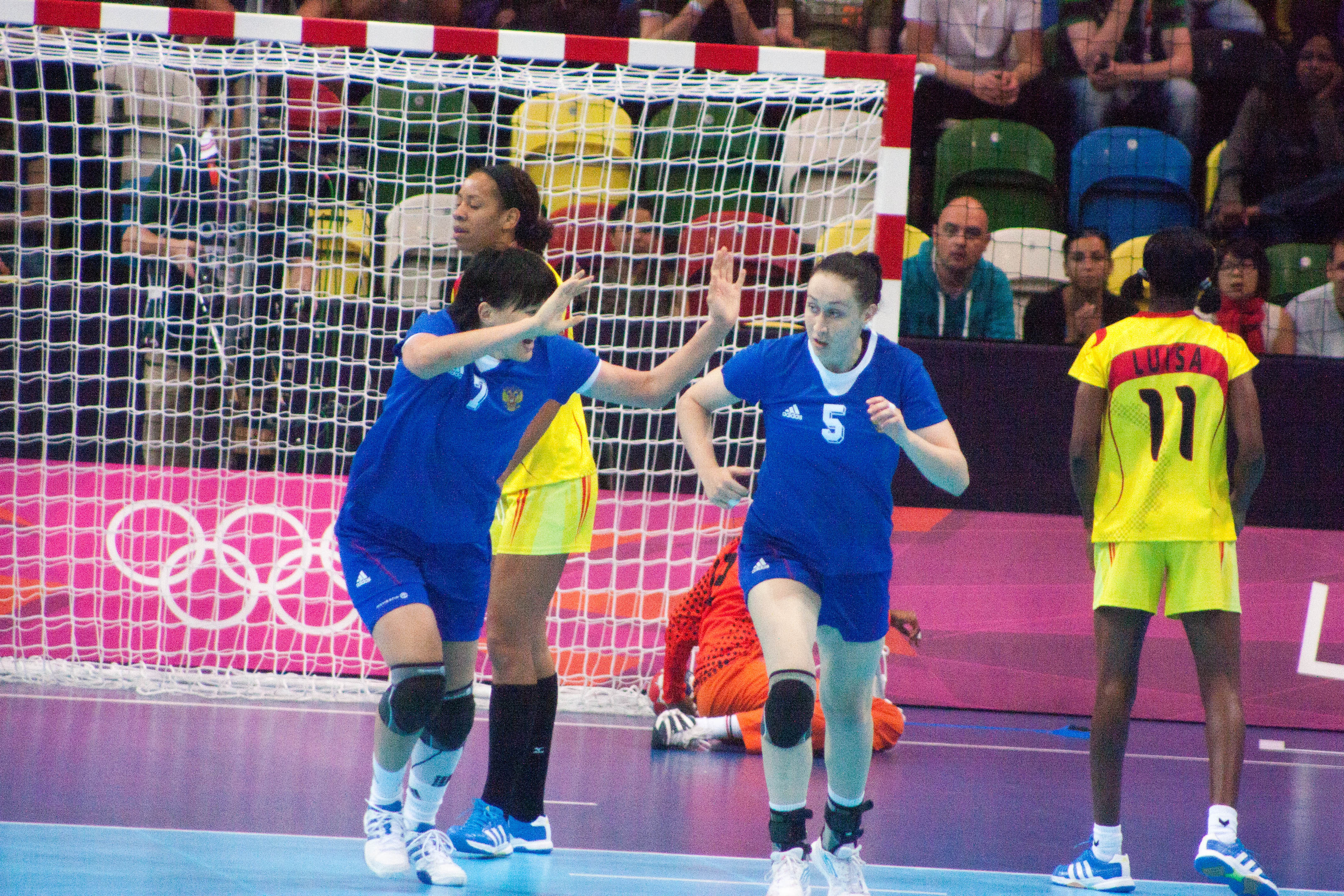
- Postnova (#5), 2012

Personal information
- Full name: Lyudmila Grigoryevna Postnova
- Nationality: Russian
- Born: 11 August 1984 (age 42) Yaroslavl, Russia
- Height: 1.83 m (6 ft 0 in)

Sport
- Sport: Handball
- Position: Left back
- Number: 5

Senior clubs
- Years: Team
- 2004–2009: Lada Togliatti
- 2010–2016: Zvezda Zvenigorod
- 2016–2019: HC Astrakhanochka
National team
Years	Team	Apps	(Gls)
–	Russia	206	(712)
Medal record
Olympic Games
Silver medal – second place	2008 Beijing	Team
World Championship
Gold medal – first place	2005 Russia
Gold medal – first place	2007 France
Gold medal – first place	2009 China
European Championship
Silver medal – second place	2006 Sweden

Lyudmila Grigoryevna Postnova (Russian: Людмила Григорьевна Постнова) (born 11 August 1984) is a former Russian handball player for, who last played for HC Astrakhanochka and the Russian women's national handball team. Postnova is considered one of the greatest Russian players of all time.

She won gold medal with the Russian winning team at the 2005 World Women's Handball Championship in Saint Petersburg, Russia, again at the 2007 World Women's Handball Championship in France, and once more at the 2009 World Women's Handball Championship in China, when she was also given the title of Most Valuable Player of the championship.

== Club career ==
She has played for Russian club Lada Togliatti from 2004 to 2009. From 2010 to 2014, she played for Zvezda Zvenigorod. She then took a break from handball. In February 2016 she returned to play handball at HC Astrakhanochka. Here she won the championship the same season. After the 2017-18 season she retired.
