= Marion Limal =

French handball player (born 1987)

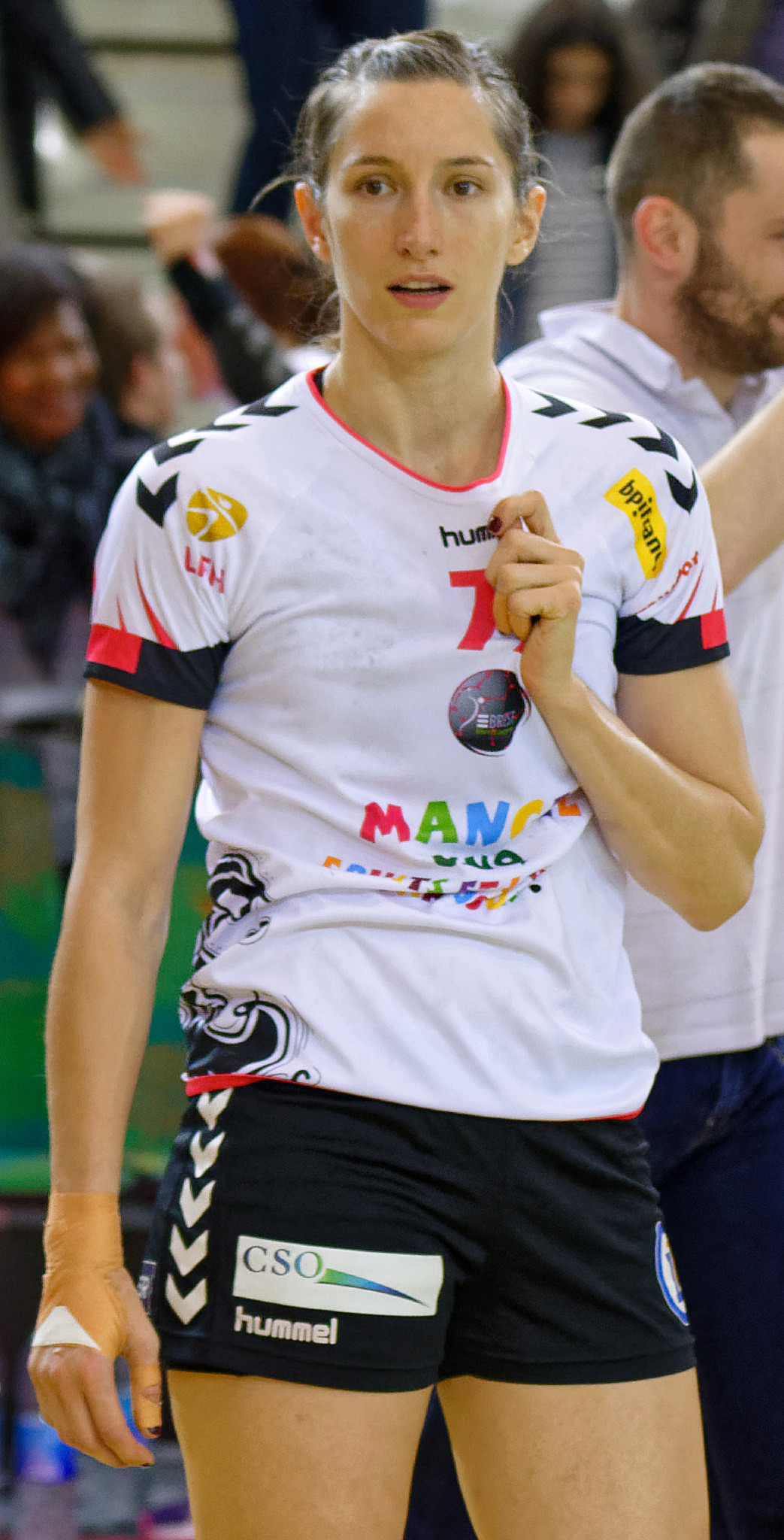
- Limal in 2017

Personal information
- Nationality: French
- Born: 12 January 1987 (age 39) Fontaine-lès-Dijon, France
- Height: 184 m (604 ft)

Sport
- Sport: Handball
- Position: Left back
- Current club: Roz Hand’Du 29
- Number: 77

Senior clubs
- Years: Team
- 2001-2005: SHBC La Motte Servolex
- 2005-2009: Entente Sportive Bisontine Féminin
- 2009-2011: Hypo Niederösterreich
- 2011-2012: Metz Handball
- 2012-2014: Handball Cercle Nîmes
- 2014-2019: Brest Bretagne Handball
- 2014-2019: Roz Hand’Du 29
National team
Years	Team	Apps	(Gls)
2008-	France	47	(79)

Teams managed
- 2021-: Brest Bretagne Handball (u18)
- 2023-: France Beach
Medal record
Representing France
World Championship
Silver medal – second place	2009 China	Team
Mediterranean Games
Gold medal – first place	2009 Pescara	Team
- Updated on 16 September 2024

Marion Limal (born 12 January 1987) is a French handball player and coach. She plays for the French club Roz Hand’Du 29 and for the French national team.

She participated at the 2009 World Women's Handball Championship in China, winning a silver medal with the French team.

In 2021 she became the coach for the Brest Bretagne Handball's men's team. In 2023 she became the coach of the France Beach National team together with Joëlle Demouge.
