= Hela Msaad =

Tunisian handball player

Personal information
- Nationality: Tunisian
- Born: August 9, 1979 (age 47) Mahdia, Tunisia

Sport
- Sport: Handball
- Position: Right Wing

Senior clubs
- Years: Team
- –: ASE Ariana
- –: ASF Mahdia
National team
Years	Team	Apps	(Gls)
1996–2012	Tunisia	178	(582)

Hela Msaad (born 9 August 1979) is a Tunisian handball player. She plays for the club A.S.E. Ariana and for the Tunisian national team.

She participated at the 2009 World Women's Handball Championship in China, where Tunisia placed 14th.
