= Simona Spiridon =

Romanian-Austrian handballer (born 1980)

Personal information
- Nationality: Austrian
- Born: 1 February 1980 (age 46) Roman, Romania
- Height: 1.85 m (6 ft 1 in)

Sport
- Sport: Handball
- Position: Line Player
- Current club: Hypo Niederösterreich
- Number: 80

Senior clubs
- Years: Team
- 1998–2001: A.S. Silcotub Zalau
- 2001–2006: Hypo Niederösterreich
- 2006–2007: CS Rulmentul Braşov
- 2007–2011: Győri ETO KC
- 2011–2012: Zvezda Zvenigorod
- 2013–2014: Hypo Niederösterreich
National team
Years	Team		
–2004	Romania		
2004–2014	Austria	98	(368)

Teams managed
- 2012–2014: Hypo Niederösterreich youth
- 2014–: Austria youth

Simona Spiridon (née Popa; born 1 February 1980 in Roman, Romania) is a Romanian-Austrian former handballer and handball coach. She featured in the Austrian national team.

== Career ==
Romanian born Spiridon moved to Austria in 2001 when she signed for Hypo Niederösterreich. Having gained Austrian citizenship, her first outing with her new national team came in 2004, at a tournament in Ukraine where they defeated Belarus. Averaging 3 goals per match, Spiridon has scored over 368 goals in 98 international appearances.

Her club successes are well documented. With Romania, she has picked up two gold medals in younger age category World and European Championships in addition to the 4 Hungarian Cup and 5 Austrian Cup titles. Spiridon has also made it to the EHF Champions League Final 2009 against Viborg and semi-final on four occasions.

From autumn 2012 to 2014 Spiridon worked at Hypo Niederösterreich as a youth coach, at the beginning of the season 2013/14 she was reactivated in Hypo's squad. In the beginning of 2014 she ended her active career. In the summer of 2014 she started as a coach at the ÖHB.
