= Awa Karamoko =

Ivorian handball player

Personal information
- Nationality: Ivorian
- Born: 12 April 1985 (age 41)
- Height: 1.76 m (5 ft 9 in)

Sport
- Sport: Handball
National team
- Years: Team
- –: Ivory Coast

Awa Karamoko (born 12 April 1985) is an Ivorian international team handball player.

== Career ==
Karamoko has played on the Ivorian national team. She participated at the 2009 World Women's Handball Championship in China and at the 2011 World Women's Handball Championship in Brazil.
