= Viktoriia Tsybulenko =

Ukrainian handball player

Personal information
- Nationality: Ukrainian
- Born: 31 March 1978 (age 48)
- Height: 1.78 m (5 ft 10 in)

Sport
- Sport: Handball
- Position: Central back
- Current club: Karpaty Uzhgorod
- Number: 20
National team
Years	Team	Apps	(Gls)
–	Ukraine	35	(78)
- Updated on 4 December 2012

Viktoriia Tsybulenko (born 31 March 1978) is a Ukrainian handball player for Karpaty Uzhgorod and the Ukrainian national team.
