= Tatyana Dronina =

Russian handball player

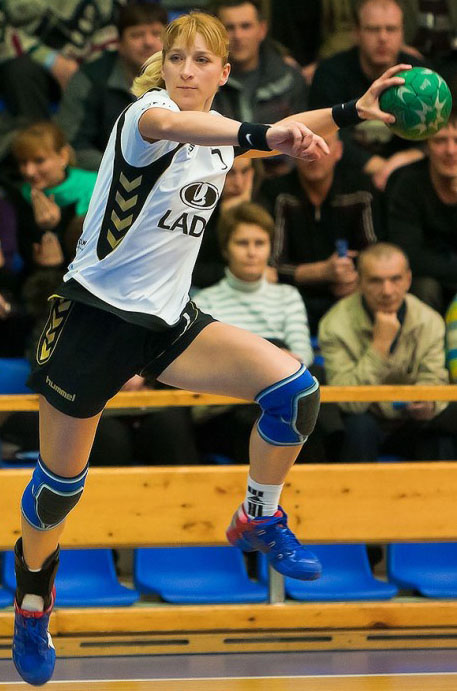

Personal information
- Full name: Tatyana Nikolayevna Dronina
- Nationality: Russian
- Born: 16 November 1978 (age 47) Balashikha, Russia
- Height: 1.70 m (5 ft 7 in)

Sport
- Sport: Handball
- Position: Left wing

Senior clubs
- Years: Team
- -1999: Veshnyaki
- 1999-2002: Dinamo Volgograd
- 2002-2004: Rostov-Don
- 2004-2006: Zvezda Zvenigorod
- 2008: GK-53 Moskau
- 2009-2010: Zvezda Zvenigorod
- 2010-2011: Handball Club Lada
- 2011-2012: Zvezda Zvenigorod
- 2012-2013: HC Kuban Krasnodar
National team
- Years: Team
- 2005–?: Russia
Medal record
World Championship
Gold medal – first place	2009 Beijing	Team

Tatyana Nikolayevna Dronina (Russian: Татьяна Николаевна Дронина; born 16 November 1978) is a Russian team handball player, playing for the club Zvezda Zvenigorod and for the Russian women's national handball team.

At the 2009 World Women's Handball Championship she reached the final and won the gold medal with the Russian team.

== Career ==
Dronina started playing handball at age 13, and played until 1999 for the Moscow club Veshnyaki. She then joined top league cub Dinamo Volgograd, where she won the 2000 and 2001 Russian championship and finished second in 2002. She then joined Rostov-Don for two years, before joining Zvezda Zvenigorod. In 2006 she took a break from handball due to pregnancy.

She returned to handball in the summer of 2008, where she joined GK-53 Moskau. Half a season later she returned to Zvezda Zvenigorod. In 2010 she joined Handball Club Lada. Just a season later she signed for Zvezda Zvenigorod for a third time. Lastly she joined HC Kuban Krasnodar for the 2012-13 season, after which she retired.

=== National team ===
Dronina made her debut for the Russian national team in 2005. With the Russian team she won the 2009 World Championship.
