= Ines Khouildi =

Tunisian handball player (born 1985)

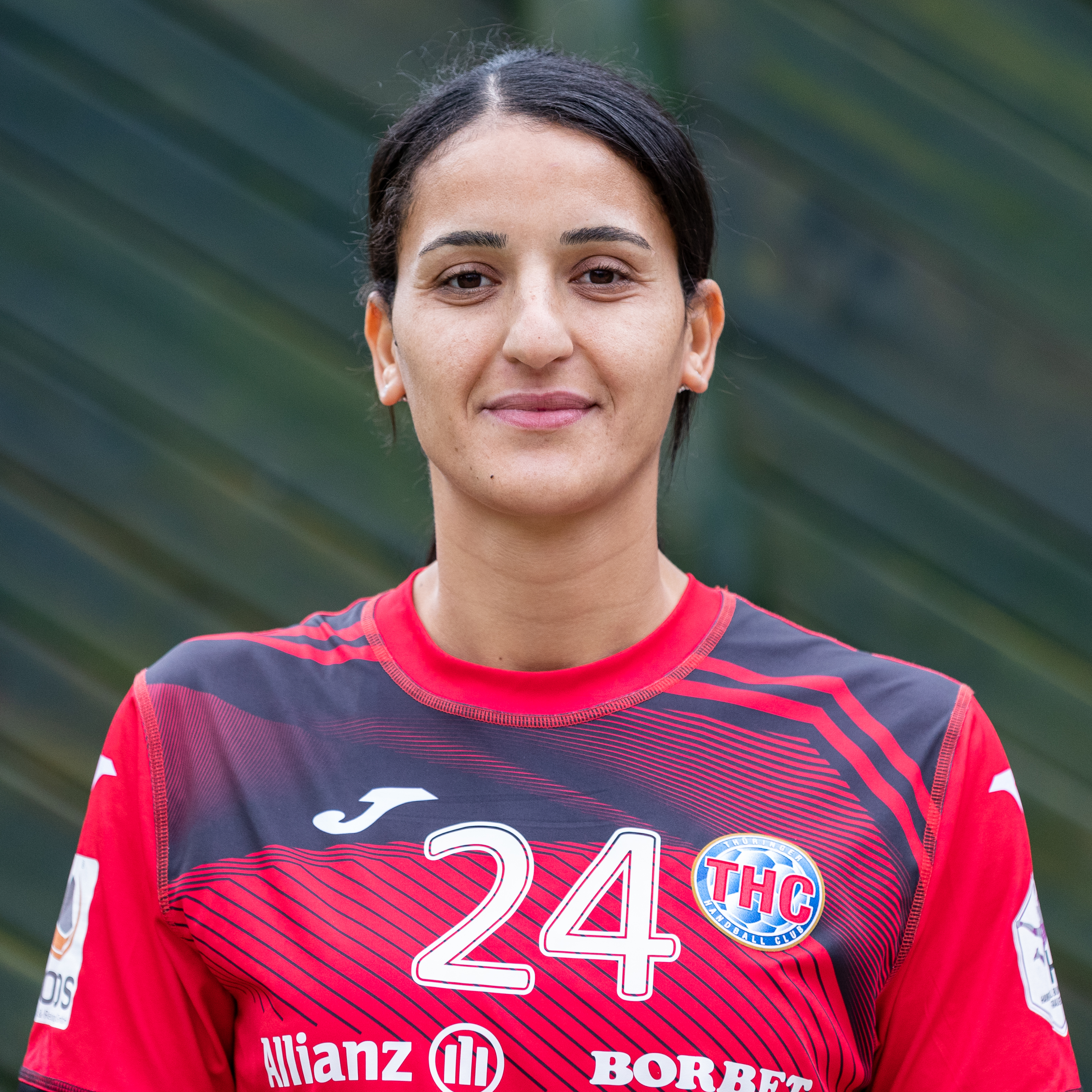

Personal information
- Nationality: Tunisian
- Born: 11 March 1985 (age 41) Nefza, Tunisia
- Height: 1.83 m (6 ft 0 in)

Sport
- Sport: Handball
- Position: Left back
- Current club: Thüringer HC
National team
Years	Team	Apps	(Gls)
–	Tunisia	125	(277)

Ines Khouildi (born 11 March 1985) is a Tunisian handball player for Thüringer HC and the Tunisian national team.

She was part of the Tunisian team at the 2015 World Women's Handball Championship.
