= Rosária da Silva =

Angolan writer and poet (born 1959)

- Born: April 4, 1959; Golungo Alto, Cuanza Norte Province, Portuguese Angola
- Died: August 11, 2022 (aged 63); Lisbon, Portugal
- Occupations: Writer and poet

Rosária da Silva (4 April 1959 – 11 August 2022) was an Angolan writer and poet.

== Life ==
Rosária da Silva was born on 4 April 1959 in Golungo Alto (Cuanza Norte Province) of the Portuguese colony of Angola. After her secondary education, she studied education with a focus on Portuguese linguistics at the Instituto Superior de Ciências de Educação (ISCED) at the Agostinho Neto University in the capital city of Angola, Luanda.

In the 1980s, she was co-author of the magazine Kilimba where they mainly published poems and articles in the "Culture and Women" category. In 1984, Silva joined the Literary Youth Brigade in Lobito. In 1987, she took part in the first meeting of Angola's young authors. In the 1980s and 1990s, she also wrote in the "Life and Culture" section of the state newspaper Jornal de Angola. Silva was active not only as a writer but also devoted himself to the theater and music, among other things, she wrote the plays "A falta de casas", "Conflitos" and "Ilusão". The latter two plays were staged in 1985 e 1989, respectively. Since 1988 she has been a full member of the Union of Artists and Composers of Angola (UNAC). From the 1980s to the 1990s she taught at a boarding school.

Published in 1999, Rosária da Silva's first novel was entitled "Totonya". She is considered one of the first novelists in the history of the Angolan literature. The book received the honorable mention of the Prémio Literário António Jacinto. "Totonya" has scenes of explicit sex that strongly protest the physical and psychological abuse of women. Silva showed in her works - from theater to literature - especially the perspectives of Angolans. She was unusual among her Angolan peers in that she moved beyond the Marxist class struggle roots into issues of body politics and tradition versus modernity.

Rosária da Silva worked as provincial director for media in the province of Cuanza Norte and was also managing director of the regional monthly magazine "Kilombo - Kwanza Norte Actualidade."
