= John Steelman =

John Steelman may refer to:

- John R. Steelman, first person to serve as the assistant to the President of the United States
- John Hansson Steelman, fur trader and interpreter
