= John Hansson Steelman =

Fur trader in 17th and 18th century Pennsylvania and Maryland

- Born: Johan Hansson; 1655; Grays Ferry, Philadelphia, Province of Pennsylvania
- Died: January 1, 1749 (aged 94); Adams County, Province of Pennsylvania
- Occupations: Interpreter, fur trader
- Years active: 1679-1740
- Known for: First permanent white settler in Pennsylvania west of the Susquehanna River
- Spouse: Maria Stalcop (c. 1666 - ?)
- Relatives: Sons: John Hans Steelman Jr., Måns Steelman; Grandfather: Olof Persson Stille

John Hansson Steelman, also known as "Hance" Stillman, Stelman, Tilghman, or Tillmann (1655–1749), the eldest son of Hans Månsson and Ella Olofsdotter Stille. He was a fur trader and interpreter who traded with Shawnee, Susquehannock and Piscataway Indians in Maryland and Pennsylvania. Steelman made substantial donations to support the construction of the Holy Trinity Church (Old Swedes) Church, probably covering as much as a third of the building costs. He died in 1749 in Adams County, Pennsylvania at the age of 94.

== Birth and parents ==
The relative locations of New Netherland (magenta) and New Sweden (blue) in America; modern state boundaries and postal abbreviations are shown.

Steelman was born to Hans Månsson (1612-1691) from Skara Municipality in Sweden. His father served as a cavalryman in the Västgöta Regiment during the Thirty Years' War, 1638-1640, and came to New Sweden in 1641 as a criminal after being convicted of cutting down eight trees in the Royal Garden at the Varnhem Abbey which was owned by the Swedish Royal family. After serving six years on a tobacco plantation, he was freed and became a respected leader in Dutch New Netherland, serving as a spokesman for the settlers and commanding officer of the militia at Wicaco. Steelman's mother, Ella Stille (1634-1718), was a widow and the oldest daughter of Olof Persson Stille.

Steelman was born Johan Hansson in Aronameck or Grays Ferry, Philadelphia, Pennsylvania. In 1693 he changed his name to John Hansson Steelman, from a combination of his mother's maiden name Stille and her husband's patronym, Måns.

== Marriage and family ==
John Hansson Steelman married Maria or Mary Stalcop in 1679, in New Castle, Delaware. She was born in 1666 to Johan Andersson Stålkofta and Christina Carlsdotter. They had at least five children, including three sons, John Hans Steelman, Jr., Måns (sometimes spelled Mountz) Hans Steelman, and Peter Hans Steelman.

== Career as Indian trader and interpreter ==
In the mid-1670s John Hansson moved with his parents to Senamensing (now Cinnaminson Township, New Jersey) in Burlington County. He married 13-year-old Maria Stalcop in 1679, and in 1687 Steelman bought 200 acres on Red Clay Creek, in partnership with Peter Stalcop, his brother-in-law. In 1693 Steelman and his family moved to Sahakitko, later known as Elk Landing in Cecil County, Maryland, where Steelman embarked on an Indian trading career.

Steelman and his oldest son John were naturalized as residents of Cecil County by an act of the Maryland General Assembly in October 1695. By 1697 he was Maryland's chief interpreter in its dealings with the Indians of the upper Chesapeake Bay and Pennsylvania. He is called John Hance Tillman, or sometimes Tilghman, in the Maryland records. Steelman also established trade with the Shawnees at Pequea on the Susquehanna, and at Pechoquealin (now Smithfield Township, Monroe County, Pennsylvania) on the Delaware, before 1697.

On 1 June 1697, Steelman was called before a joint conference of the Council of Maryland and asked to give an account of the Susquehannock and other Indians living on Chesapeake Bay. He replied that he had visited these Indians and had collected some information about the different tribes, as the Council had directed. He reported:

"At Canistauga, the Susquehanna and Seneca Indians have about forty lusty young men, besides women and children; that the Shevanor [Shawnee] Indians, being about thirty men, besides women and children, live within four miles of Canistauga, lower down, and submit themselves and pay tribute to the Susquehannas and Senecas that the Delaware Indians live at Minguannan, nine miles from the head of Elk River, and fifteen miles from Christeen, and about thirty miles from Susquehanna River; are about three hundred red men, and are tributary to the Senecas and Susquehannas; fifty of them living at Minguanon, the rest upon Brandywine and Upland Creeks."

On 26 May 1698, a conference was held at Steelman's trading-house at Sahakitko between John Thompson and two other commissioners, sent by Governor Nathaniel Blakiston of Maryland, and the chiefs of the Susquehannocks, the Shawnees, and the Delawares. In the minutes of the Maryland Council it is noted that "In the evening came Meaurroway, king of the Shawanees, brought on horseback, by reason of his great age, together with one of his great men."

An entry in the Maryland Council Records, dated 23 July 1698, states that

"Capt. John Hans Tilman [Steelman], an Indian Trader at the head of the [Chesapeake] Bay, being asked concerning the Indians that live there, what nations they are, he says they are Chauhannauks [Shawnees], Susquehannahs, & Delaware; that the Chauhannauks are about forty men & live at a Town fifty miles from his house; the Susquehannahs are about fifty men, live two miles further up, at Caristauga, and came from the Seneques; that the Delawares live at White Clay Creek; are about forty men."

On 29 August 1700, Steelman served as an interpreter at a meeting of Maryland colony delegates with the leaders of the Susquehannocks, Shawnees, and Delawares. The Shawnees were represented by their king, Ophesaw (Opessa Straight Tail). Steelman's name is signed as a witness to the treaty made between Penn and the Susquehannocks, on 23 April 1701, ceding their lands along the Potomac River to the English in return for protection and trade privileges. In October 1702, "John Hans Tillman" (Steelman) was ordered to act as interpreter in an investigation into robberies supposedly committed by some Conestoga Indians.

=== Wealth ===
By the late 1690s, Steelman appeared to have considerable wealth. He donated £320 for the purchase of land and for the construction of the Holy Trinity Church (Old Swedes) (completed in 1699), including £220 in loans and £100 as a gift, receiving in return use of the best pews, and the promise that he and his wife would be buried within the church. Between 1704 and 1711, Steelman acquired over a thousand acres in Cecil County. In October 1704, Steelman bought 150 acres east of the Susquehanna between what is now Port Deposit and Perryville, Maryland. In February 1705, he purchased 400 acres at Octoraro Creek. In September 1705, he acquired 200 acres near Conowingo Creek. By 1707 he owned 100 acres to the northwest of Elk River, and in April 1711, he bought 200 acres west of Principio Creek. He established a second trading post about this time at Octoraro Creek. In June 1714, in a Cecil County suit by William Browne vs. John Hans Steelman, various properties on the home estate at Elk Landing were attached for a debt owed to Browne, suggesting a sudden decline in Steelman's wealth.

=== The death of Francis Le Tort, 1711 ===
Francis Le Tort (often erroneously referred to as "Francis de la Tore"), the son of explorer Jacques Le Tort and the younger brother of French-Canadian Indian trader James Le Tort, was apprenticed or indentured to Steelman. In 1711 he stole (or tried to free) several slaves (probably other white bond-servants) and fled into the forest. Steelman offered bounty to some Shawnee warriors to bring him back dead or alive, and Francis was killed. According to testimony provided for an investigation led by Deputy Governor Charles Gookin, when Steelman discovered that Le Tort and the slaves were missing, he went to the home of Shawnee chief Opessa Straight Tail at Pequea Creek, who later testified that

"John Hans came to his cabin, when [Opessa] and his young people, who were then going a hunting, were in council; [Steelman] told him that some of his slaves and dogs (meaning La Tore and company) were fled; therefore desired him forthwith to send some of his people to bring them back or kill them, and take goods for their trouble. At which motion, Opessa, being surprised, told him that he ought by no means to discourse after that manner before young people who were going to the woods and might by accident meet these people; and therefore ordered him to desist, utterly denying his request."

Opessa Straight Tail was absolved by Governor Gookin for the murder, and all but one of the Shawnee warriors responsible for killing Le Tort were hunted down and killed. There is no record that Steelman suffered any consequences. Opessa was forced to abdicate as Shawnee chief and fled to Shamokin for several years, to escape repercussions.

== Conflict with the colonial authorities ==
Steelman became the most prosperous and successful Indian trader in northern Maryland, to the point where many Native communities preferred to trade with him rather than with the Pennsylvania traders. By 1701, this was affecting their profits, and William Penn felt that Steelman should obtain a Pennsylvania trader's license since he was doing so much business across the Pennsylvania-Maryland border. In April, 1701 Penn had Steelman's trade goods confiscated at Philadelphia while they were in transit to Lechay (Lehigh Township, Northampton County, Pennsylvania). William Penn wrote to him on 12 April 1701, notifying him of the seizure of these goods. The letter was addressed to "John Hans" but in Penn's report of the matter to his Council, the name is written as John Hans Steelman. At a meeting held on 31 May, Governor Penn stated to his Council, that

"whereas, there then is a law of this Govemt. prohibiting all persons to trade with the Indians in this Province, but such as dwell and reside therein, and have a license from the Govr. to that end; notwithstanding which, John Hans Steelman, represented to live in Maryland, and having no such license, had, ever since the enacting of said law [in May, 1700], followed a close trade with the Indians of the Province, not only at Conestoga, but had been endeavoring to settle a trade with them at Lechay, or ye Forks of Delaware, to the great prejudice of the trade of this Province in general; for which reason the Govr. has seized such of his goods as are going to Lechay, and taken security from him for such goods as he had bought and sold at Conestoga."

In 1705, Steelman planned to open a trading post at Conestoga, to the dismay of the Pennsylvania provincial authorities. In October 1705, James Logan visited the Indians at Conestoga where he met the chief of the Conestogas, the Shawnees, and the Conoys. He told them "that he understood John Hans was building a log house, for trade amongst them, which made us [the Government's representatives] uneasy; and desired to know whether they [the Indians] encouraged it. To which they answered that they did not; and [they] were desired not to suffer any Christians to settle amongst them without the Govrs. leave."

== John Hansson Steelman House at Elk Landing ==
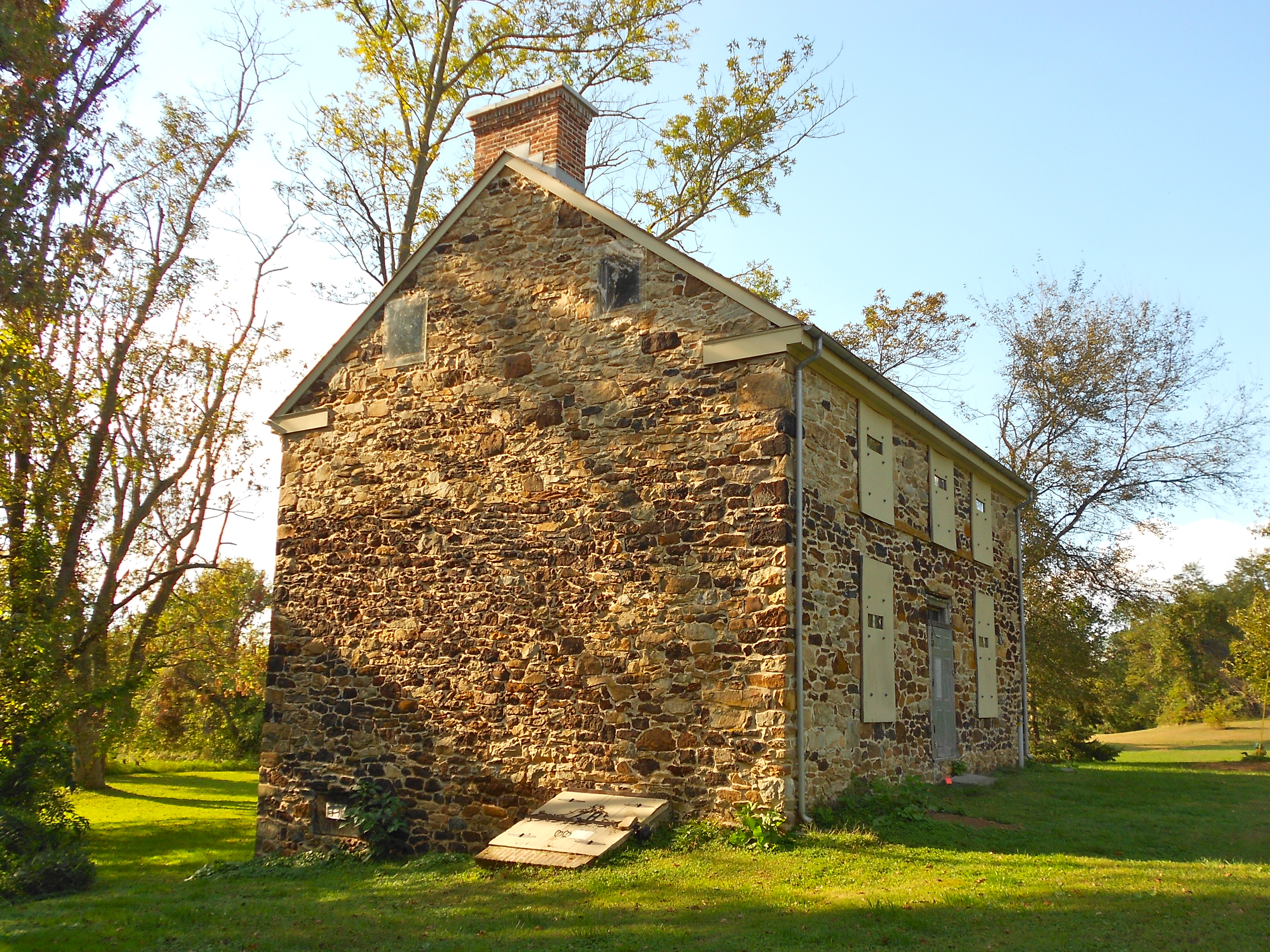
Steelman's 1697 stone house where he lived with his family for 23 years. It was fully restored in 2009.

Steelman moved in 1693 to Sahakitko (present-day Elkton, Cecil County, Maryland) on the Little Elk River, where he built a log cabin and then a stone house and became one of the foremost Indian traders. The stone Steelman house was converted into a tavern in 1735, then was occupied as a residence until the late 1960s, after which it was abandoned and fell into disrepair. The house at Elk Landing was listed on the National Register of Historic Places in 1984. The entire Elk Landing site has been protected and developed by the non-profit Historic Elk Landing Foundation that was created in 1998 by the town of Elkton. It was structurally restored in 2009 at a cost of over $400,000 raised through donations.

The first log cabin that Steelman lived in was adjacent to the later stone house and survived until at least 1905. Steelman began building a house of locally-procured fieldstone about 1693. The 1693 New Sweden census shows his family living at Sahakitko. The house may have been completed by 1697.

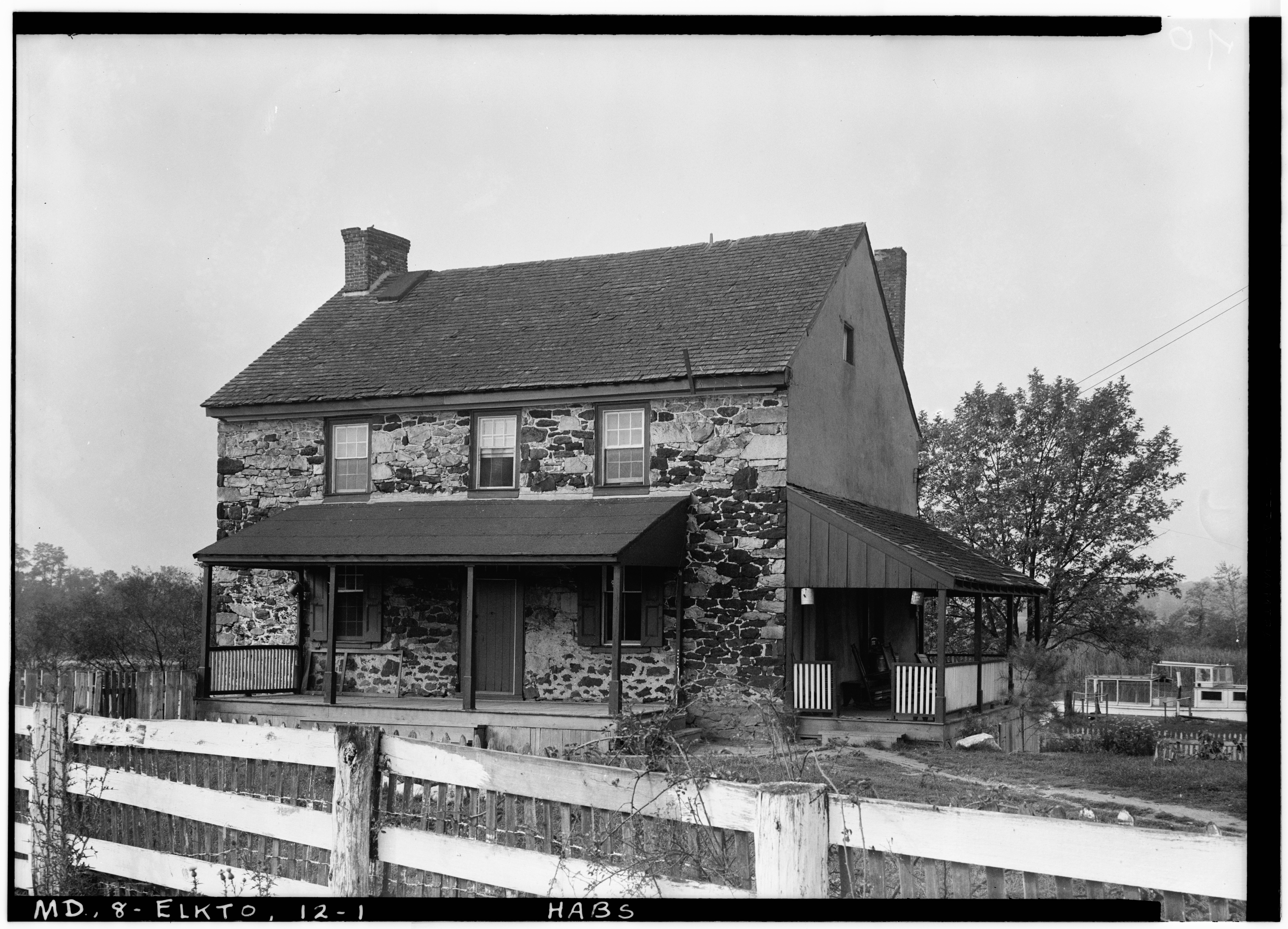
The Steelman house as it appeared in October, 1936. Historic American Buildings Survey, E.H. Pickering, photographer.

From 1693 until about 1720, Elk Landing was Steelman's home, trading post and base of operations. He traded with the Shawnee, Susquehannock, Piscataway, and Lenape Indians of South Central Pennsylvania and Northern Maryland, trading manufactured goods for animal pelts. The building was probably originally oriented to the west, toward the creek. Trading took place in the basement, which had a large, arched doorway that faced the creek behind the house. There was probably a dock where trade goods and pelts were loaded and unloaded.

Steelman's house had four usable floors, including a basement for trading post activities, two main living floors plus an attic probably used as sleeping quarters by his children, and which also served as a play room. The home had six typical Swedish-style corner fireplaces, five of which have survived. There were thirteen large windows, including three attic windows and transom windows over the entrance doors, a measure of wealth as glass was very expensive and hard to get. The house probably had three porches with three doorways.

A doorway on the east side led into a kitchen, which was probably the original log cabin residence and trading post that Steelman lived in while he was building the stone structure. An archeological investigation found signs of this log structure, which was converted into a kitchen, and may also have served as a combination sauna and smokehouse. It was demolished about 1905. There was a wide doorway on one side of the house, with steps leading from the outside into the basement, where goods and customers could enter the trading post area. The original basement had a dirt floor. Many Native American implements and trade goods have been found in the area.

By 1720 Steelman had moved west to what is now Adams County, where he continued his trading ventures as the first white settler in that part of the country. In 1735 the property was acquired by the Hollingsworth family, which later added the top floor and operated the property as a tavern.

== Relocation to Pennsylvania, 1730 ==
Steelman was forced to relocate his business as his Shawnee and Lenape customers moved westward into the Ohio country, pressured by the growing colonial population as new settlements were established, forests were cut down and game disappeared. By October 1724, he was a resident of the Monocacy River Valley in present Carroll County, Maryland, and had established a trading post on Little Pipe Creek, between present-day New Windsor and Union Bridge, Maryland. By 1730 he had returned to Adams County. In 1737 he was one of the signers of the infamous Walking Purchase treaty between Pennsylvania and the Delaware Indians.

== Testimony in the Penn–Calvert boundary dispute, 1740 ==
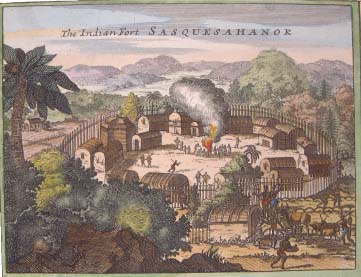
Susquehannock Fort as it appeared in 1671.

In 1740, at the age of 85, Steelman testified for the Penn family in the Penn–Calvert boundary dispute with Maryland. The testimony focused on the Susquehannock fort which was a point of contention in the border dispute, as it was a landmark supposedly defining the southern border of the Province of Pennsylvania. He made a statement to the effect that he was then aged eighty-five years; that he was acquainted with the greater part of Maryland and Pennsylvania, and well acquainted with the Bay of Chesapeake and the Susquehanna River:

"He has frequently seen both Indian towns and Indian forts, and the difference between an Indian Town and an Indian Fort is, that an Indian Town is a number of houses or cabins built or set near together; and an Indian Fort is such a town fortified or surrounded with a breast-work of poles or stakes of wood set up, and a bank of earth thrown up about them. About forty or fifty years ago, he saw an Indian Town, wherein were Indians then residing, at the point of land at the upper side of and about half a mile from the mouth of Octoraro Creek, which runs into Susquehanna River aforesaid. And at the side of, or near the said Town, this deponent then also saw an Indian Fort, consisting of a great number of poles or stakes of wood set up, and a bank of earth thrown up about the same, as herein before described, which the said Indians then told this deponent had been the Indian Fort. Says he also remembers that one Jacob Young did, before or about the same time, show this deponent the ruins of another Indian Fort which stood at about three-quarters of a mile from the said first mentioned Fort, and where the said Jacob Young then also showed this deponent several dead men's bones, and told him that a great battle had been fought there by the Indians."

For his testimony, Steelman was rewarded in 1741 with a land grant of 200 acres in Adams County.

== Death and descendants ==
Steelman died in Adams County, in 1749, aged 94, some time prior to 3 August, when a Lancaster County court authorized the administration of his estate by Hans Hamilton, possibly Steelman's grandson. At his death he had little left and his possessions were sold at an estate auction in Lancaster County for £23. Most of the items were purchased by Steelman's youngest son, Peter Hans Steelman, who paid only £4 for the Elk Landing plantation.

Maria Stalcop Steelman probably died in Adams County, Pennsylvania, but exactly when is unknown. Most of John Hansson Steelman's descendants have retained a double surname, "Hans Steelman". Steelman's oldest son, John Hans Steelman Jr., is noted for having testified against John and Edmund Cartlidge after they were charged with the murder of Sawantaeny in 1722.

== Memorialization ==
In November 1924, a historical marker honoring Steelman was erected by the Pennsylvania Historical Commission and the Swedish Colonial Society in Liberty Township, Adams County, Pennsylvania, on the land that Steelman had received as a gift following his testimony in 1740. After the original 1924 monument was stolen in 1973, a second monument was placed there in 1977, located near the Maryland State Line, on Steelman Marker Road in southern Adams County, Pennsylvania.

== See also ==
- Elk Landing
- New Sweden
- Holy Trinity Church (Old Swedes)
- Fur trade
- Hans Månsson
