= Mercer's Mill Covered Bridge =

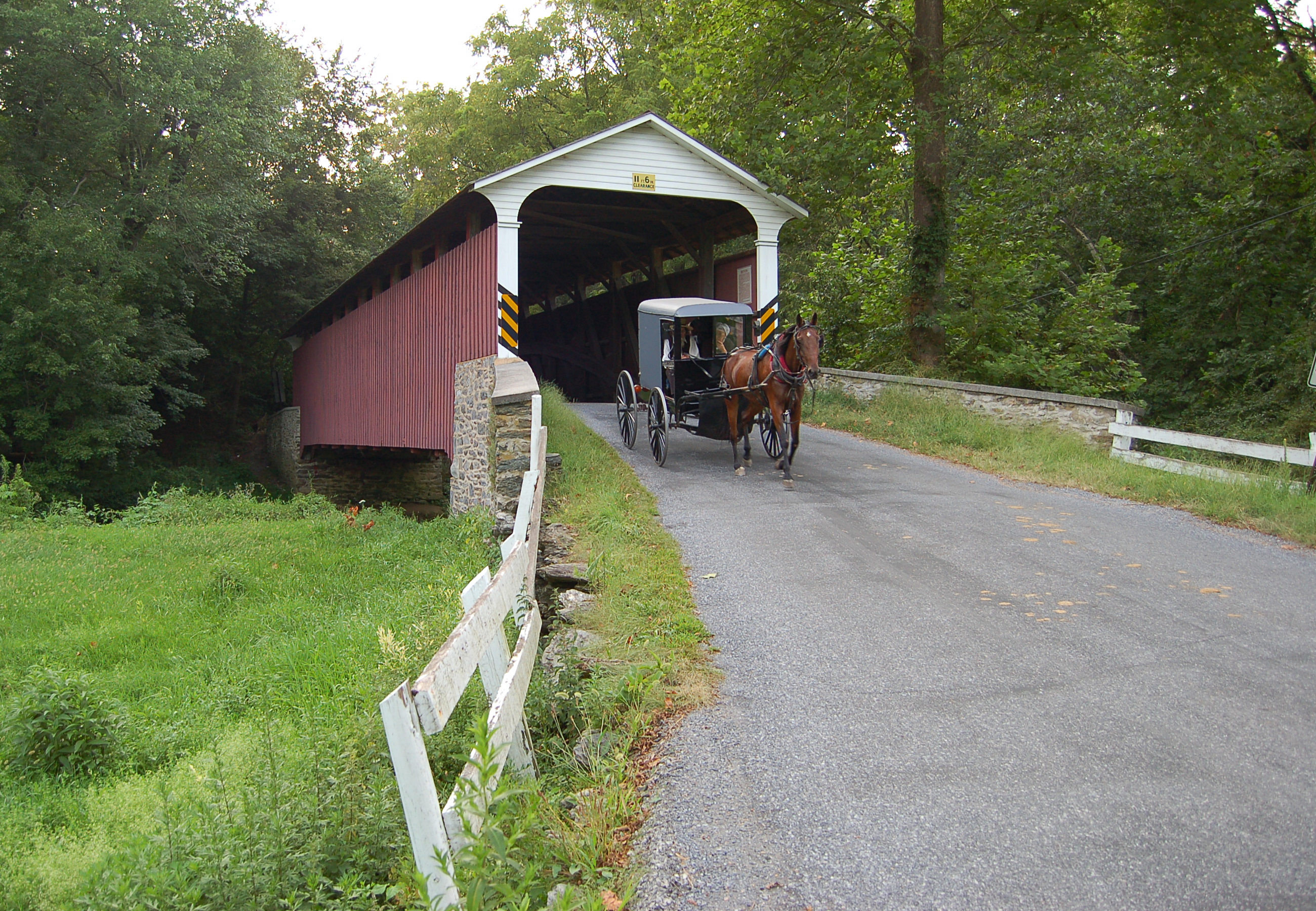
- Coordinates: 39.9315°N 75.9815°W
- Locale: Lancaster County, Pennsylvania, United States
- Other name: East Octoraro #2 Bridge

Characteristics
- Design: single span, single Burr arch truss
- Total length: 80 feet (24.4 m)

History
- Constructed by: B. J. Carter
- Construction start: 1880
- Mercer's Mill Covered Bridge
- U.S. National Register of Historic Places
- MPS: Covered Bridges of Lancaster County TR
- NRHP reference No.: 80003509
- Added to NRHP: December 11, 1980

Location
- Interactive map of Mercer's Mill Covered Bridge

The Mercer's Mill Covered Bridge or Mercer's Ford Covered Bridge is a covered bridge that spans the East branch of the Octoraro Creek on the border between Lancaster County and Chester County in Pennsylvania, United States. A Lancaster County-owned and maintained bridge, its official designation is the East Octoraro #2 Bridge.

The bridge has a single span, wooden, double Burr arch trusses design with the addition of steel hanger rods. The deck is made from oak planks. It is painted red, the traditional color of Lancaster County covered bridges, on both the inside and outside. Both approaches to the bridge are painted in the traditional white color. The bridge has a single window on only one side of the bridge.

The bridge's WGCB Numbers are 38-15-19/38-36-38. Added in 1980, it is listed on the National Register of Historic Places as structure number 80003509. It is located at 39°55′53.4″N 75°58′53.4″W (39.93150, -75.98150). The bridge is located in Sadsbury Township, 0.5 miles (0.8 km) south of Christiana on Bailey Crossroads Road off Creek Road, to the south of Pennsylvania Route 372.

== History ==
The bridge was built in 1880 by B. J. Carter. Along with the Pine Grove Covered Bridge (built in 1884), it was one of a number of covered bridges built along the border between Lancaster and Chester counties.

== Dimensions ==
- Length: 80 feet (26.5 m) span ^{Note:}
- Width: 15 feet 4 inches (4.7 m) ^{Note:}
- Overhead clearance: 11 feet 6 inches (3.5 m)
- Underclearance: 13 feet 6 inches (4.1 m)

== Gallery ==
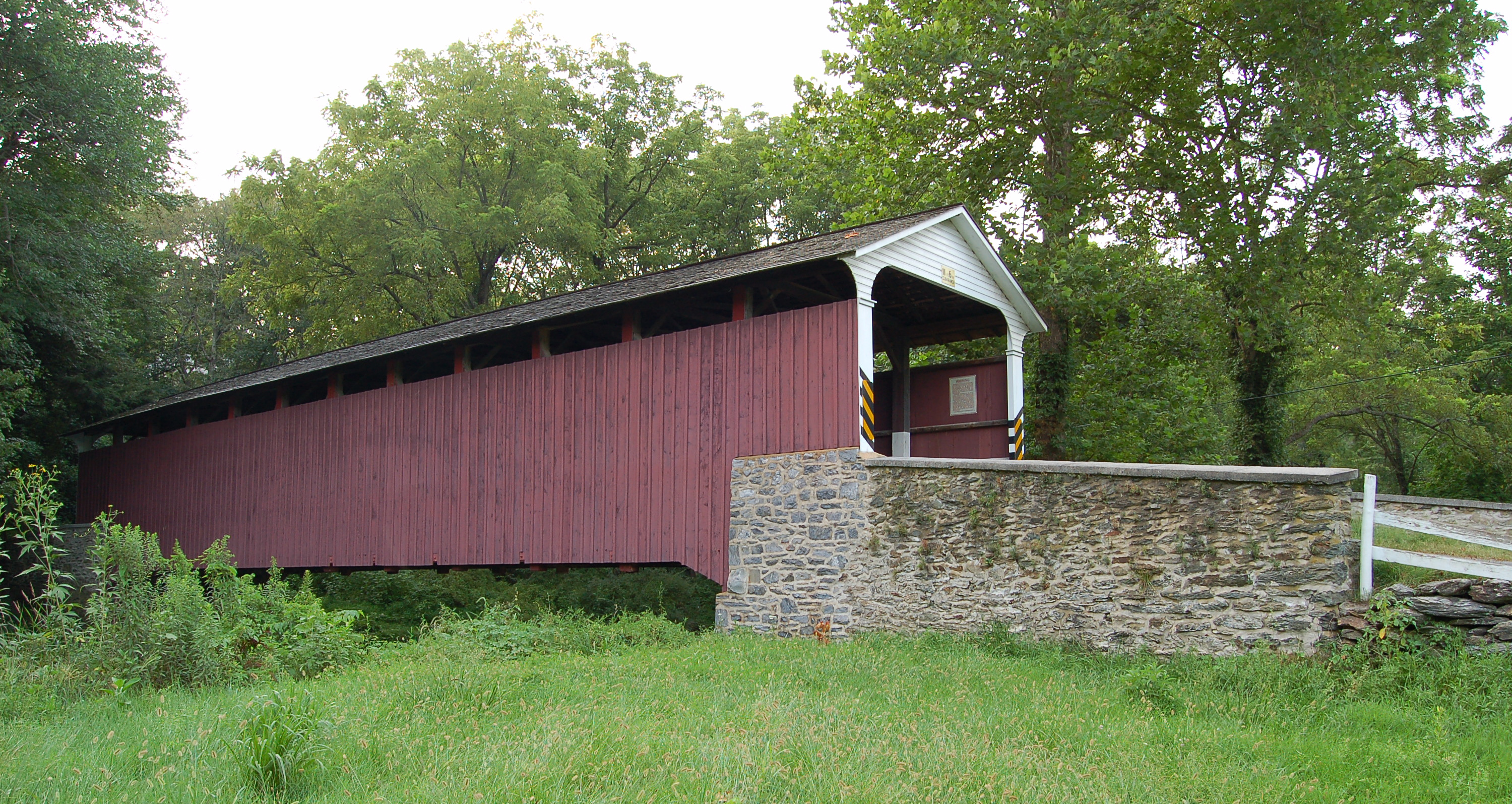

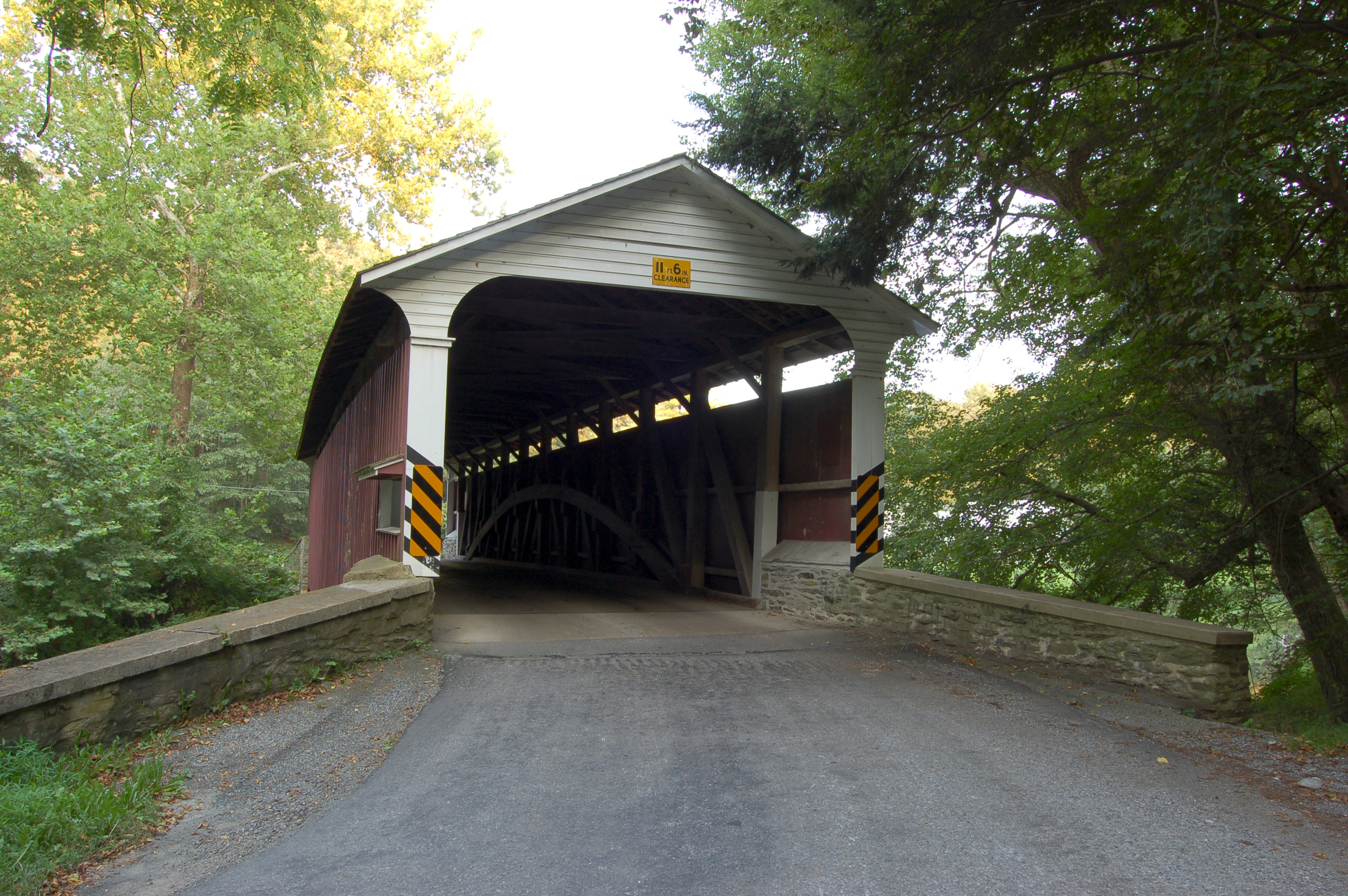

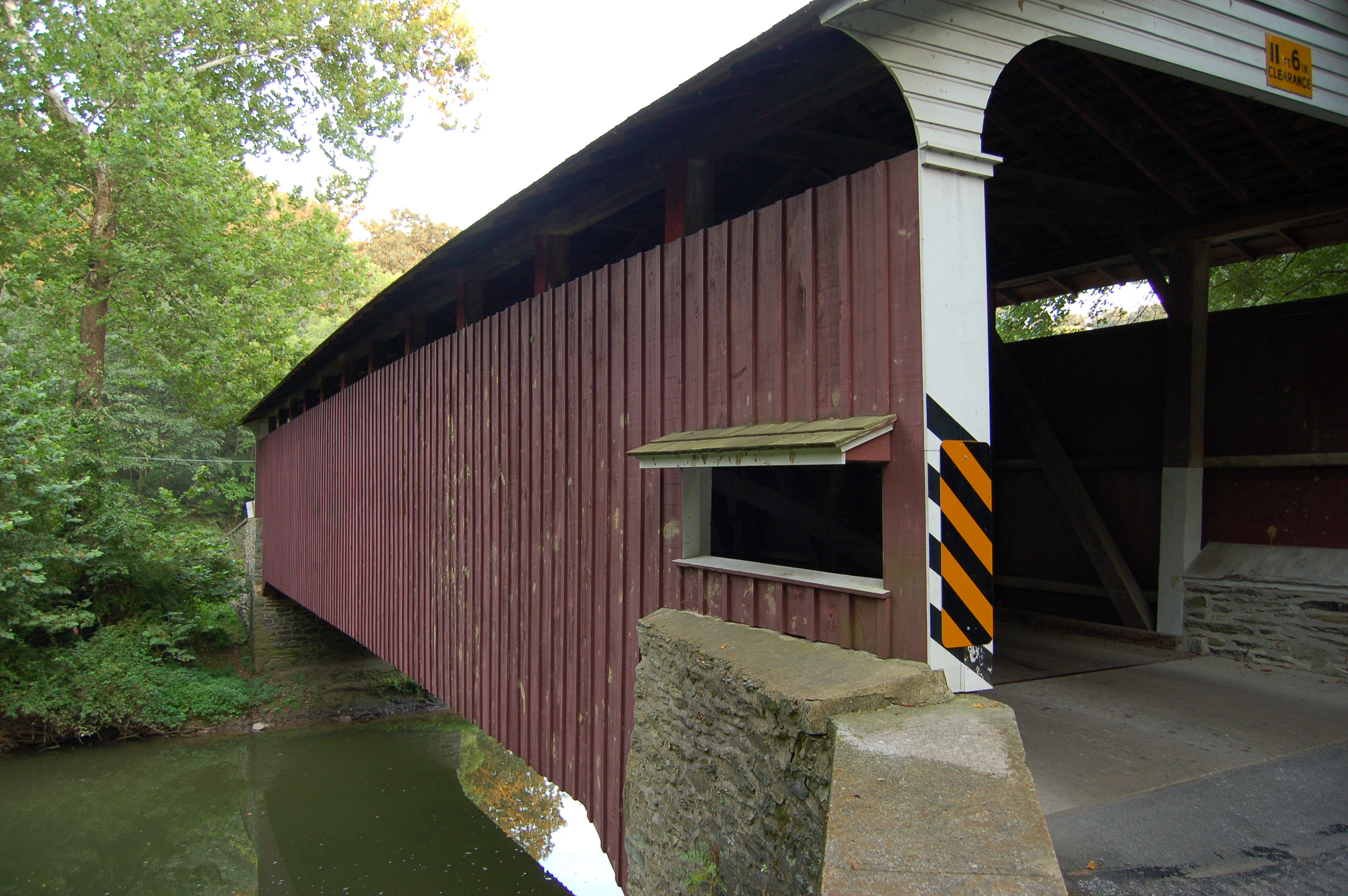

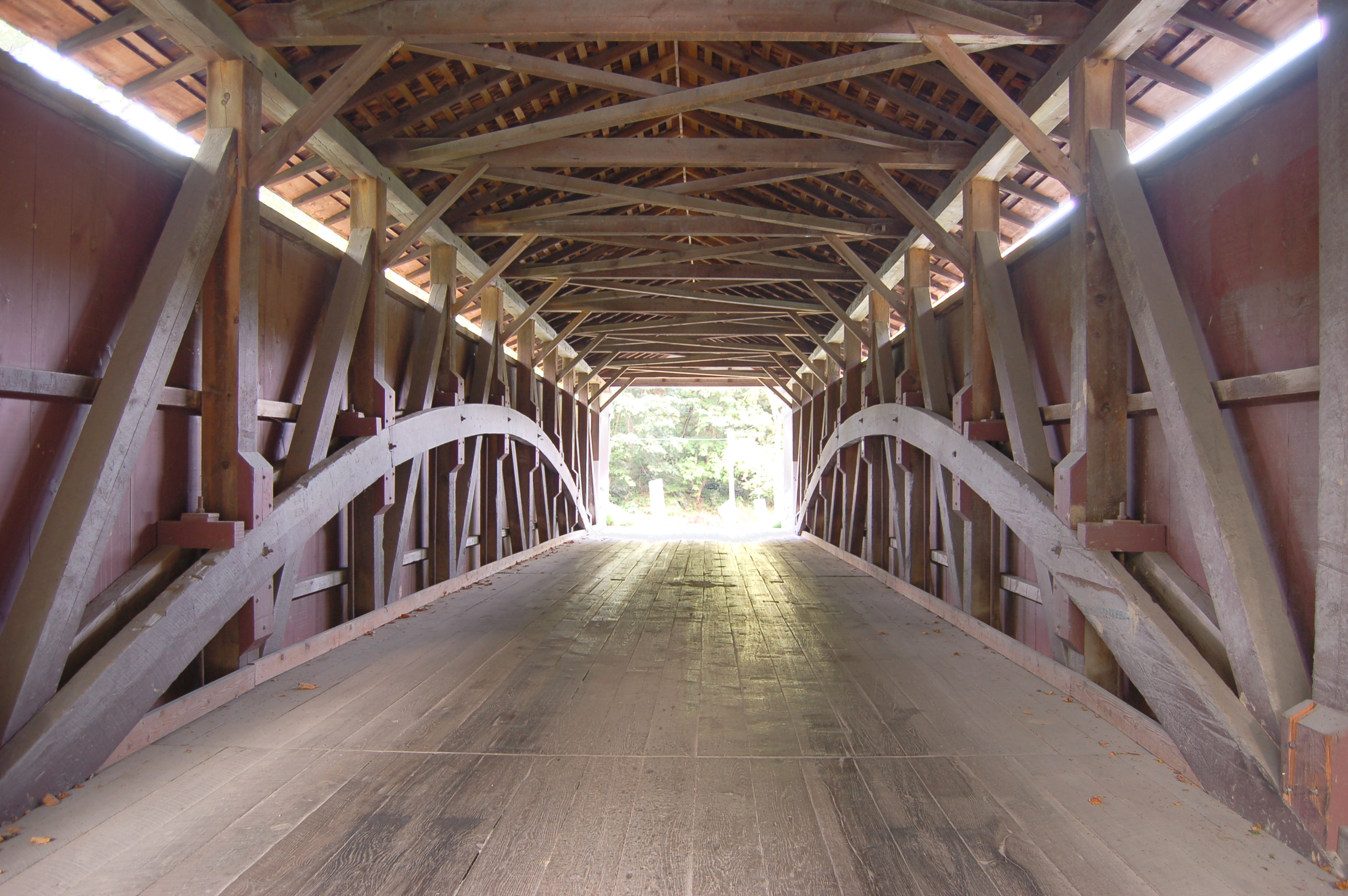

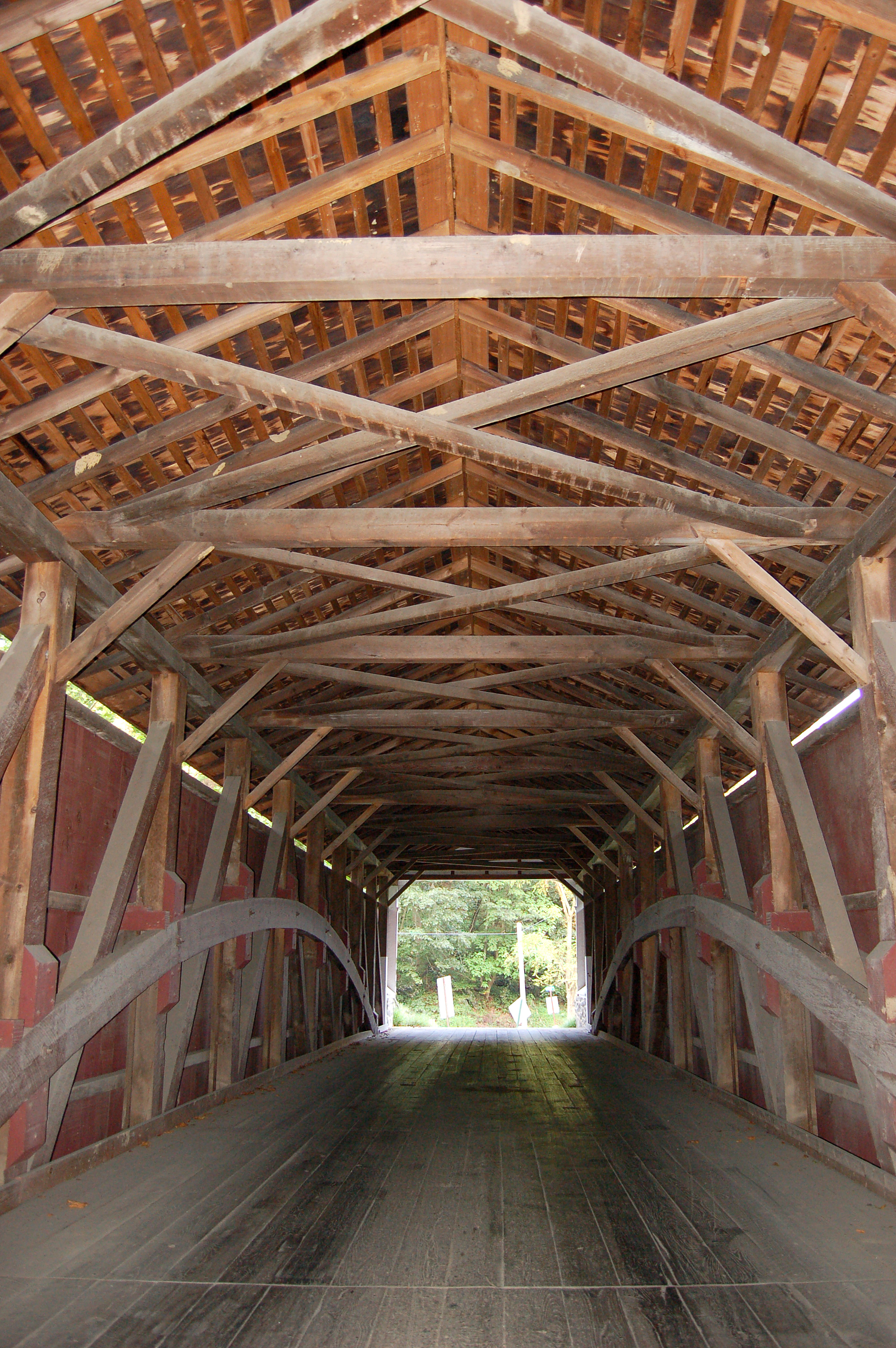

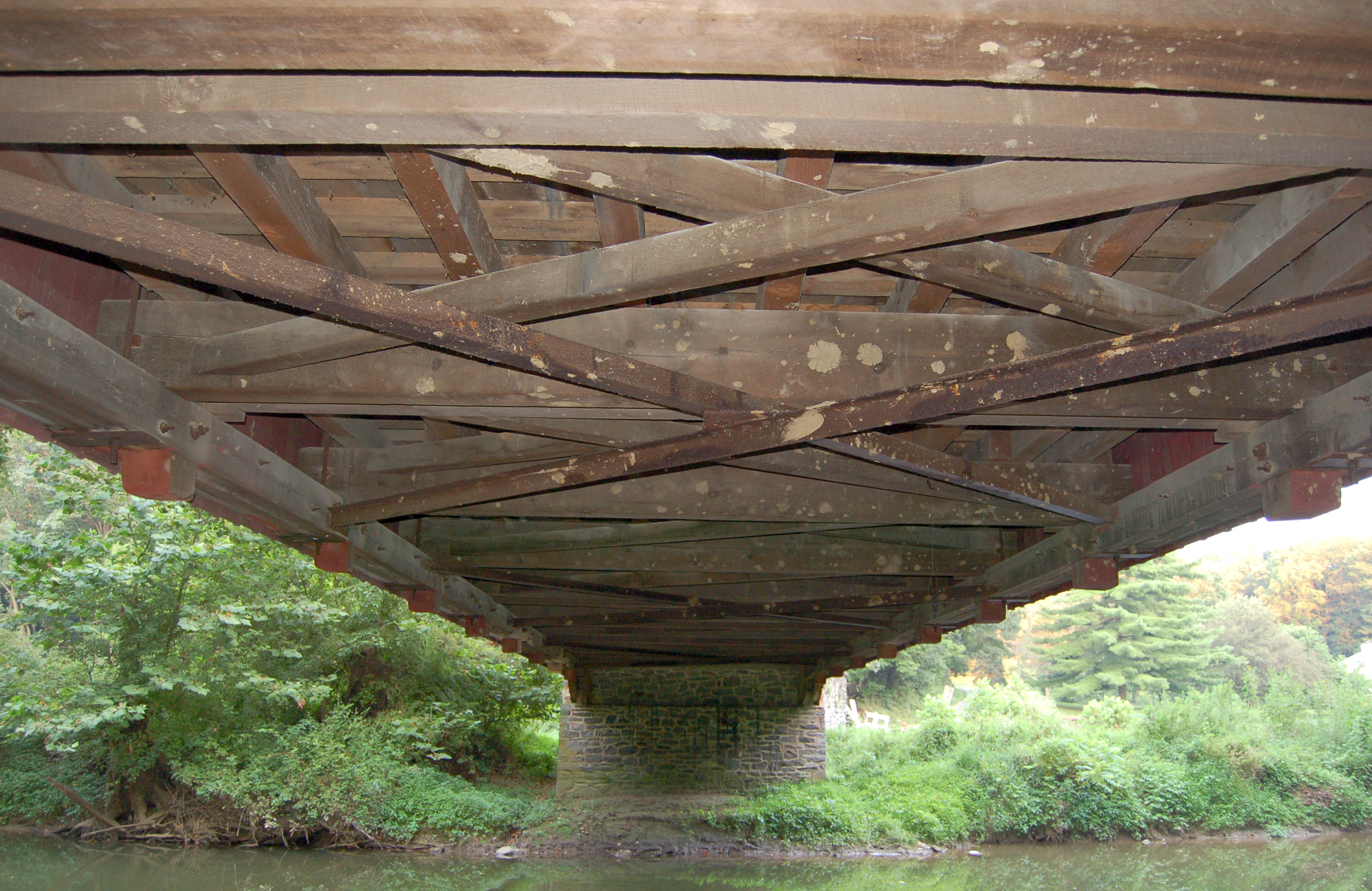

== See also ==
- Burr arch truss
- List of Lancaster County covered bridges
