= Ardala =

- Location within Västra Götaland Location within Sweden
- Coordinates: 58°22′N 13°20′E
- Country: Sweden
- Province: Västergötland
- County: Västra Götaland County
- Municipality: Skara Municipality

Area
  - Total: 0.53 km^{2} (0.20 sq mi)

Population (31 December 2010)
  - Total: 725
  - Density: 1,374/km^{2} (3,560/sq mi)
- Time zone: UTC+1 (CET)
  - Summer (DST): UTC+2 (CEST)
- Climate: Dfb

Ardala is a locality situated in Skara Municipality, Västra Götaland County, Sweden with 725 inhabitants in 2010. It was founded in 1890 and used to have a grocery store and a library, but is now only a residential area with mostly villas and one-family-houses.
