= Hans Månsson =

Soldier and landowner in 17th century Pennsylvania and New Jersey

- Born: 1612; Skara Municipality, Sweden
- Died: January 1, 1691 (aged 79); Cinnaminson Township, Province of New Jersey
- Occupations: Soldier, farmer, political activist
- Years active: 1647–1690
- Known for: First permanent European settler in Burlington County, New Jersey
- Spouse: Ella Stille (1634-1718)
- Relatives: Son: John Hansson Steelman

Hans Månsson (1612–1691) was a Swedish soldier and a convicted criminal who was sent to New Sweden along the lower reaches of the Delaware River in what is now the United States in 1641. After serving six years on a tobacco plantation, he was freed and became a respected leader in Dutch New Netherland, serving as a spokesman for the settlers, and as commanding officer of the militia at Wicaco. He purchased land and was one of the first European settlers in what is now New Jersey.

== Birth and early life ==
The relative locations of New Netherland (magenta) and New Sweden (blue) in America; modern state boundaries and postal abbreviations are shown.

Hans Månsson was born in Skara Municipality, Sweden, son of Måns Persson (1595-1637) and Brita Lillebielke (1595-1612). He served as a cavalryman in the Västgöta Regiment during the Thirty Years' War, 1638–1640.

== Criminal conviction ==
On his return from the war in 1640, Månsson camped with other troops near the Royal Garden at the Varnhem Abbey which was owned by the Swedish Royal family. Governor Carl Siggesson Rosendufva gave the men permission to pick apples from the garden, which had been neglected for decades, since the monks had handed over ownership to the crown in 1540. Månsson noted apple and cherry trees and decided to return later to get wood to make farming tools, including combs for horses' manes.

Månsson "cut down six of the finest of apple trees and two of the finest cherry trees that were present in the garden there. He cut down the trees with the intent to make mane combs for horses." Villagers heard the sound of chopping and sent a posse of horsemen to the garden, where they arrested Månsson.

At his trial on 31 May 1641, Månsson was initially condemned to hang, but the provincial governor interceded on his behalf, reading at the trial a letter from Queen Christina which stated:

Our Royal Pleasure and Command is that you shall bring him without delay to court to be condemned according to his crime, afterwards leaving to his discretion whether he should sail...on our ship from Gothenburg to New Sweden, or hang; if he chooses the voyage to the said New Sweden, then you could tell him that when he has been there for six years he will be pardoned. But if he does not, you may execute the sentence and let him hang.

== Immigration to America, 1641 ==
Hans Månsson chose to go to New Sweden and arrived in November on the same ship, the Charitas, that also brought Johan Andersson Stålkofta, Olof Persson Stille and his daughter Ella Olofsdotter Stille.

After serving six years as a tobacco worker in New Sweden, Månsson became a freeman in 1647. In 1653 he and 21 others including Olof Stille, Peter Minuit and Sven Gunnarsson signed a petition opposing Governor Johan Printz's harsh rule. Partly as a result of this petition, Printz returned to Sweden in 1654.

== Marriage and children ==
In 1654 Månsson married Ella Stille (1634-1718), the oldest daughter of Olof Persson Stille. Ella's first husband, Peter Jochimsson, had died unexpectedly in Manhattan in the summer of 1654, when she was only 20. Månsson then took over operation of the Jochimsson plantation at Aronameck (now Grays Ferry, Philadelphia) and raised Ella's two children by Peter Jochimsson as his own. Ella had six additional sons with Hans Månsson, the eldest of whom, John Hansson, was born in 1655.

== Later life ==
Relations between the New Sweden colony and the Dutch at New Amsterdam deteriorated, as both were competing to trade for furs with local Native American tribes. In August 1655, Governor Johan Risingh, suspecting that the Dutch were planning a military action, sent Hans Månsson and Jacob Sprint to Staten Island to spy on the Dutch. They returned to inform the governor that Peter Stuyvesant was preparing to invade the South River "with four large and several small ships and seven or eight hundred men," and would be ready to sail on 18 August. After the Dutch capture of Fort Casimir on 11 September, Dutch troops surrounded Fort Christina and Governor Risingh surrendered the colony to Stuyvesant.

After it was formally incorporated into Dutch New Netherland on 15 September 1655, Hans Månsson became a respected leader in New Sweden, serving as a spokesman for the settlers. In 1669 he received a patent for an 1100-acre plantation in what later became Kingsessing, Philadelphia, along the Schuylkill River between the current location of 60th Street and Woodlands Cemetery, extending as far west as Cobb's Creek. In 1672 he became captain and commanding officer of the militia at the outpost of Wicaco.

In February 1674, Månsson purchased rights for 500 acres on Pennsauken Creek from the Province of New Jersey and was the earliest white settler in what is now Burlington County, New Jersey. After selling his Aronameck plantation, Månsson moved permanently to the area in 1681. At William Penn's request, Månsson signed an affidavit on 25 June 1684, with Peter Larsson Cock and Peter Gunnarsson Rambo, supporting allegations that Lord Baltimore recognized the New Sweden colony's right to occupy land along the Delaware.

== Death, 1691 ==
Hans Månsson died in 1691 at Senamensing, (now Cinnaminson Township, New Jersey) in Burlington County. By 1693 Ella Stille and her sons adopted the surname Steelman, from a combination of her maiden name Stille and her husband's patronym, Måns. She died in Gloucester County, New Jersey on 22 January 1718, aged 83. She is buried in an unmarked grave at the Gloria Dei (Old Swedes') Church cemetery.

== See also ==
- John Hansson Steelman
- Olof Persson Stille
- New Sweden
