= Pine Grove Covered Bridge =

Covered bridge in Pennsylvania, US

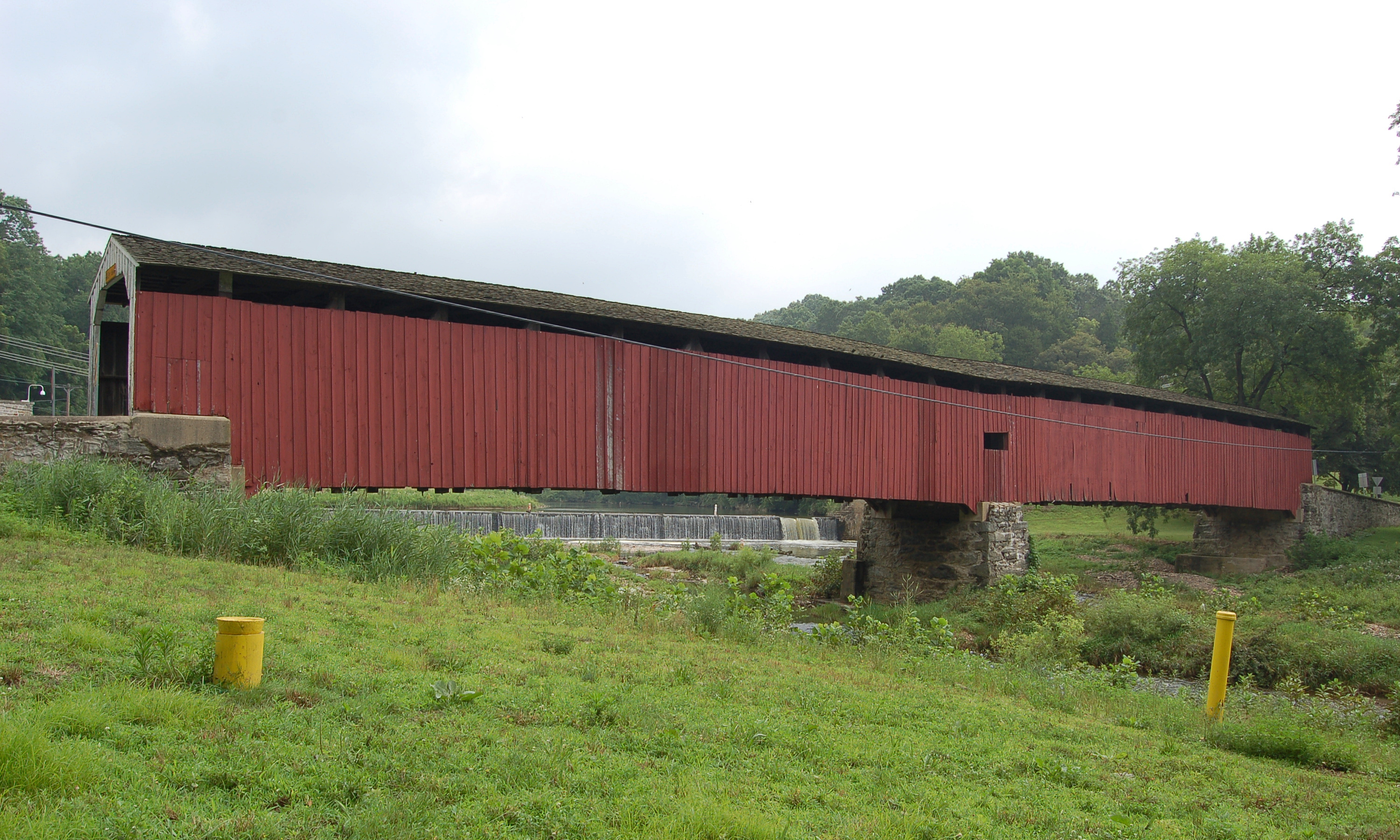
- Coordinates: 39°47′37″N 76°02′41″W
- Carries: East Branch of Octoraro Creek (Connects Lancaster and Chester counties).
- Crosses: East Branch of Octoraro Creek
- Locale: Lancaster County, Pennsylvania, and Chester County, Pennsylvania, United States

Characteristics
- Design: Two span, double Burr arch King post truss
- Total length: 195 feet (59.4 m)
- Width: 15 feet (4.6 m)

History
- Constructed by: Elias McMellen
- Construction start: 1884

Location
- Interactive map of Pine Grove Covered Bridge

The Pine Grove Covered Bridge is a covered bridge that spans the East Branch of Octoraro Creek on the border between Lancaster County and Chester County in Pennsylvania, United States. It is the longest covered bridge in Lancaster County. The bridge was built in 1884 by Elias McMellen.

== Background ==
The bridge has a two-span, wooden, double Burr arch truss design with the addition of steel hanger rods. It is the only two-span covered bridge still in use. The bridge's deck is made from oak planks. It is painted red, the traditional color of Lancaster County covered bridges on the outside, but is not painted on the inside. Both approaches to the bridge are painted in the traditional white color.

The bridge's WGCB Number is 38-15-22/38-36-41. Added in 1980, it is listed on the National Register of Historic Places as structure number 80003521. It is located at 39°47′36.6″N 76°2′39.6″W (39.7935, -76.04433).

== Nearby covered bridges ==
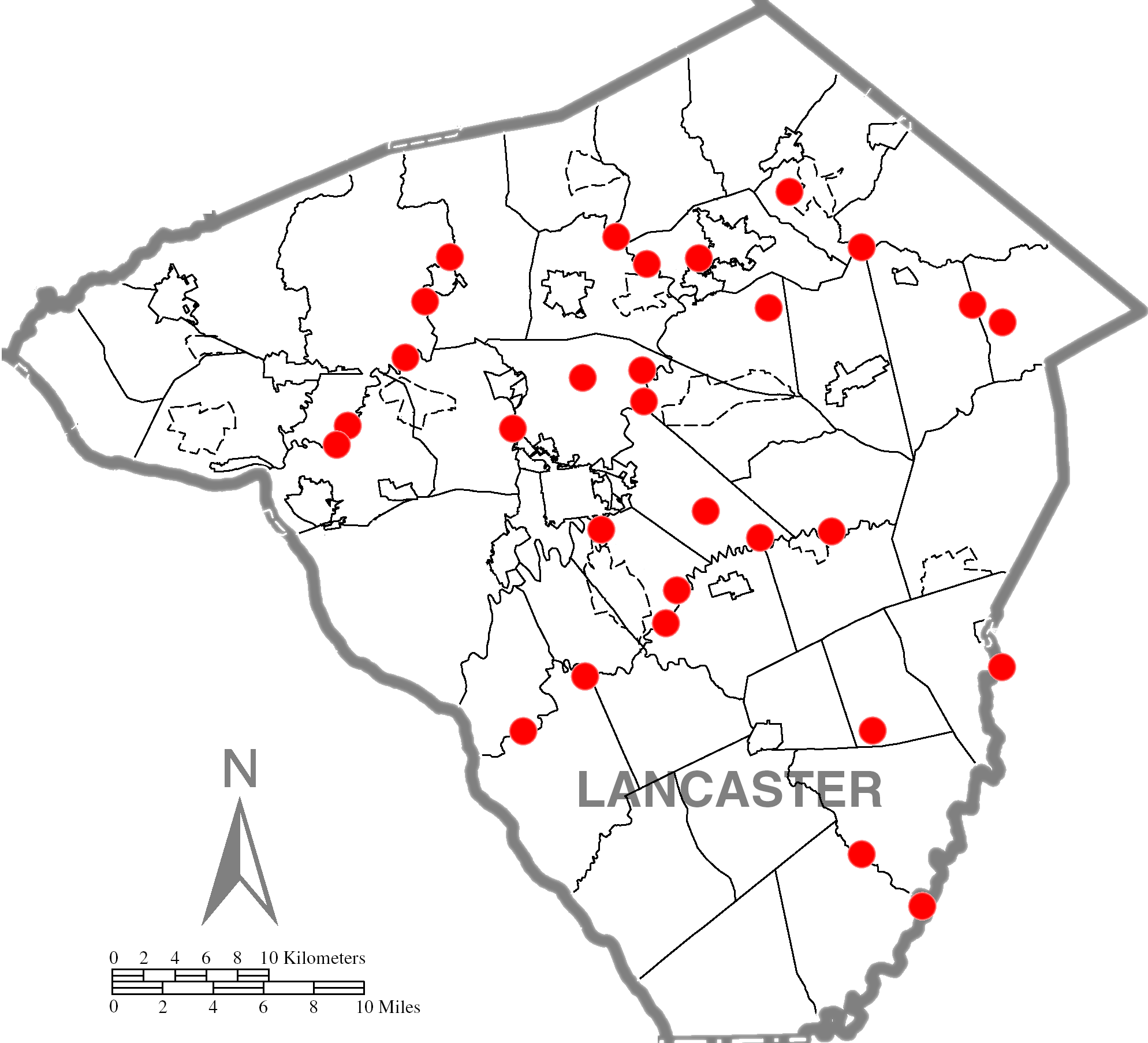
Map of the 29 existing covered bridges as of October, 2006 (clickable)

- White Rock Forge Covered Bridge, about 4.4 miles (7.1 km) northwest on White Rock Road, via Asheville and King Pen Roads.

== Gallery ==
Far away view from above

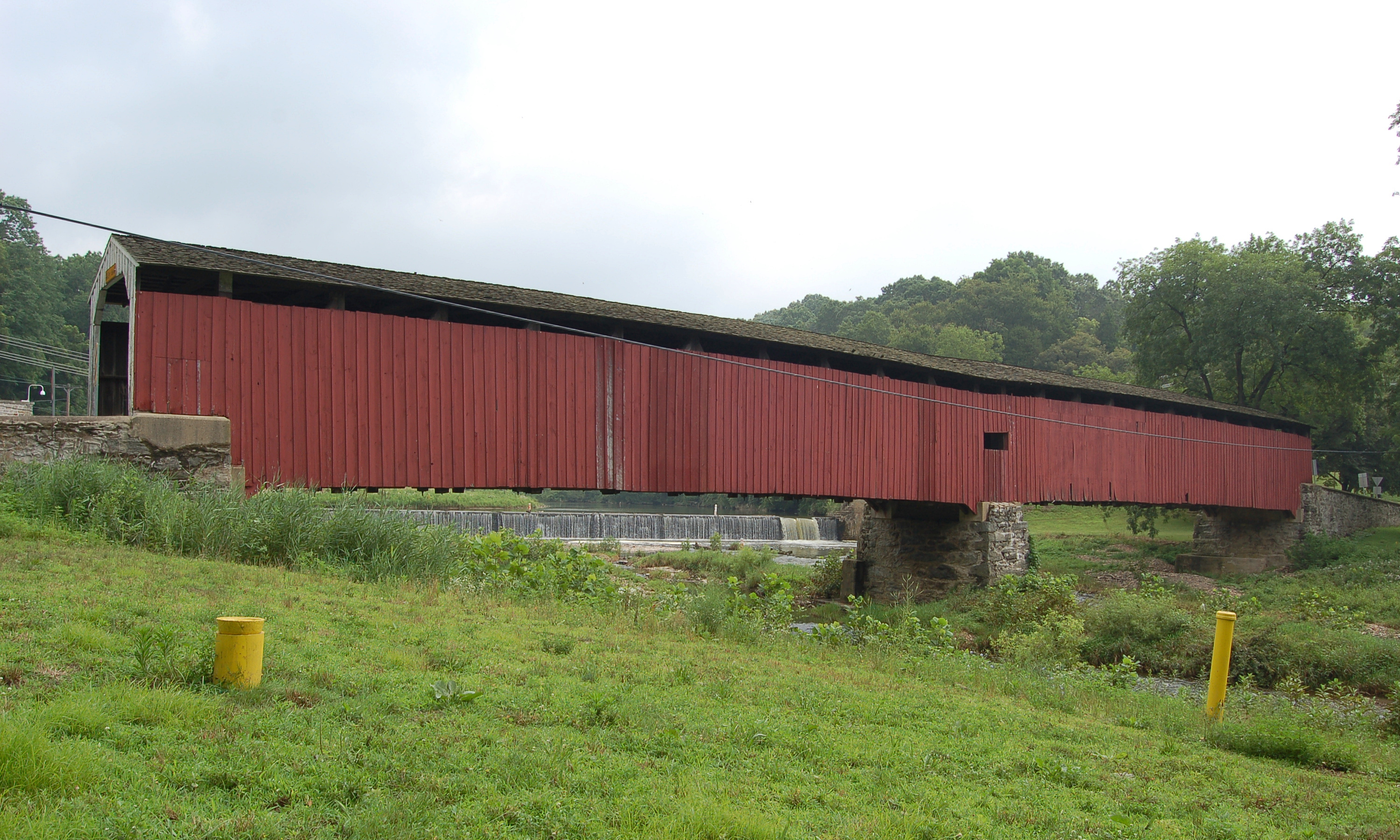
Wide view

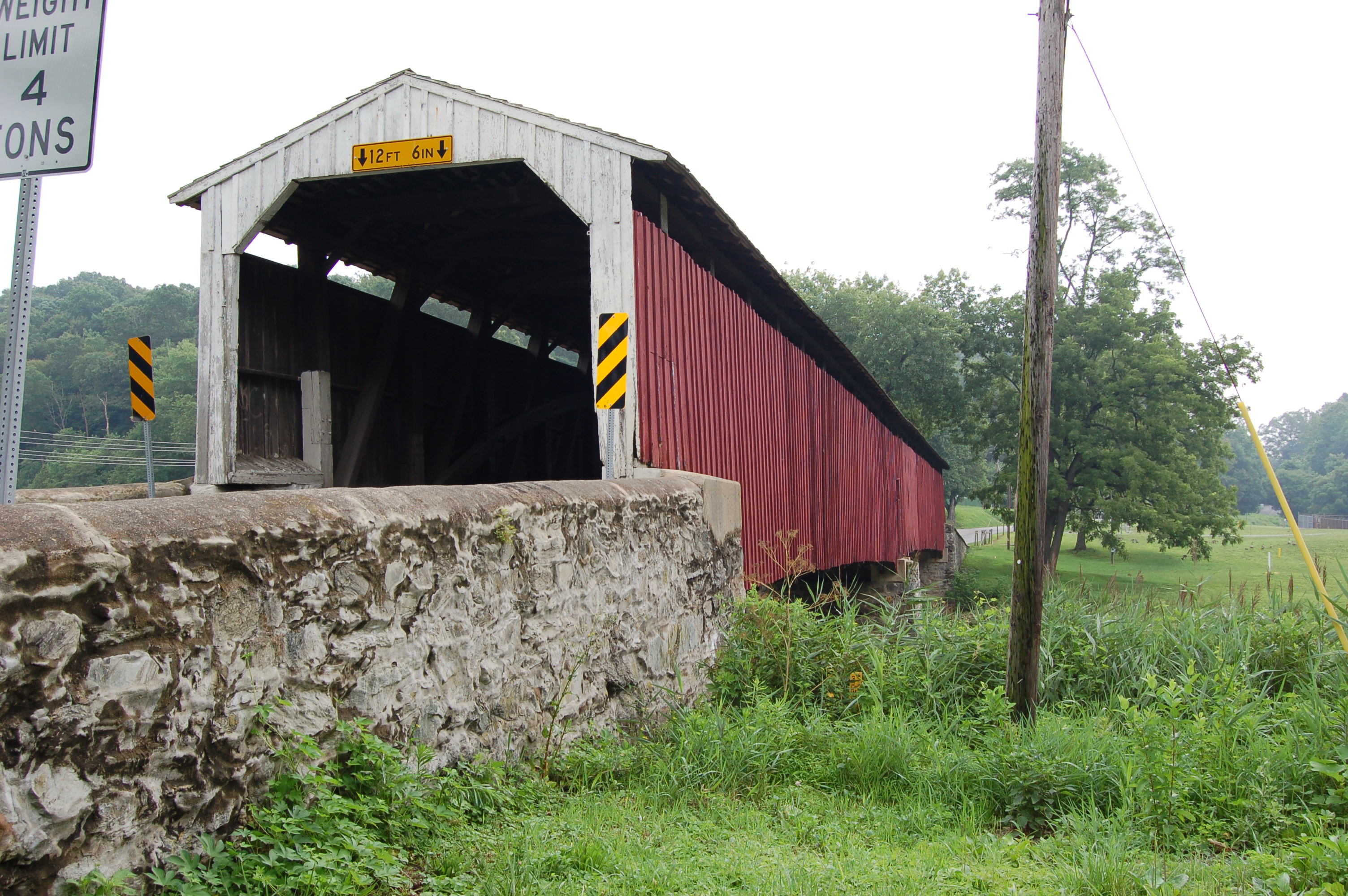
Three-quarters view

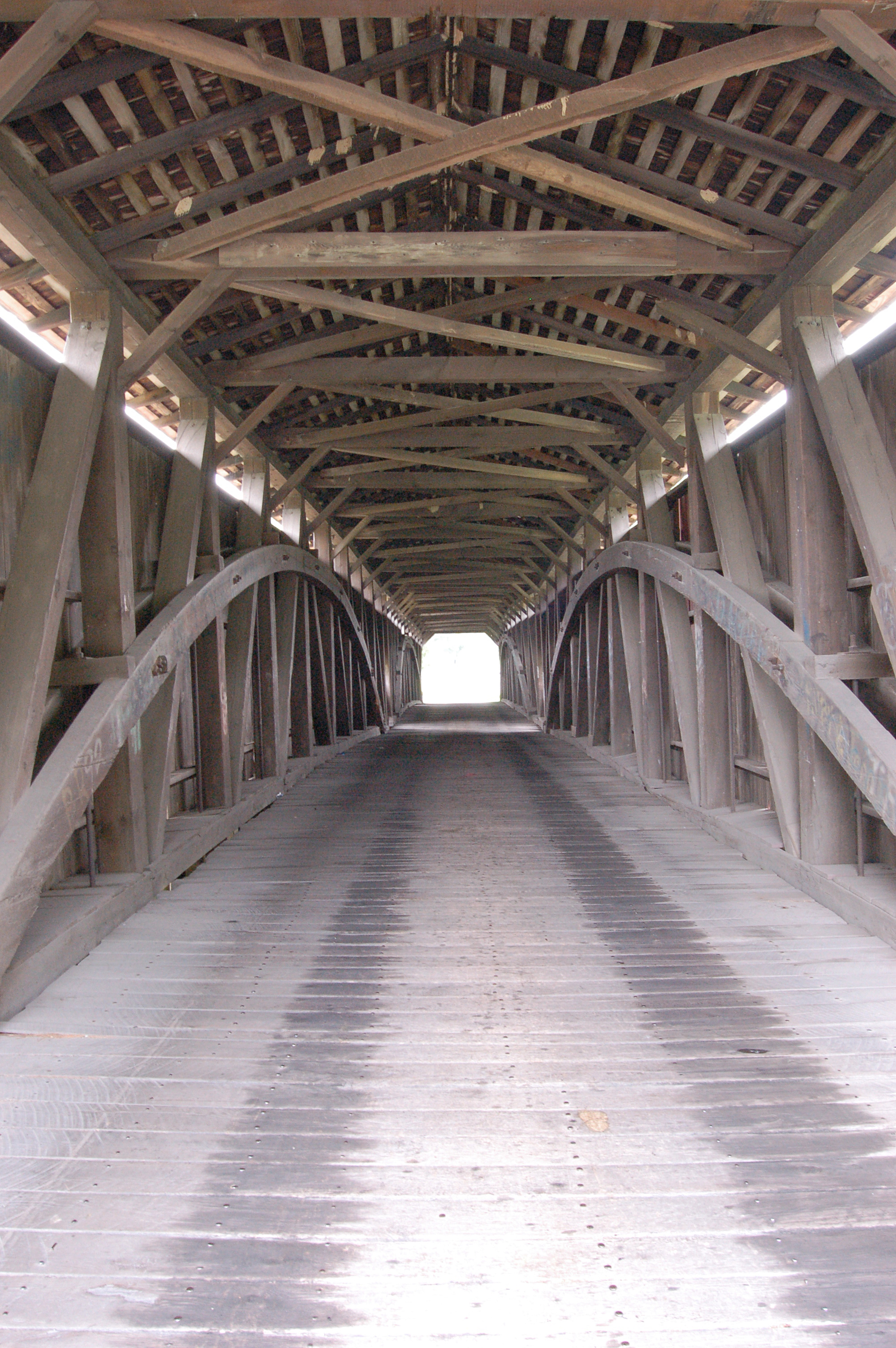
Inside of the bridge showing the double span Burr arch truss

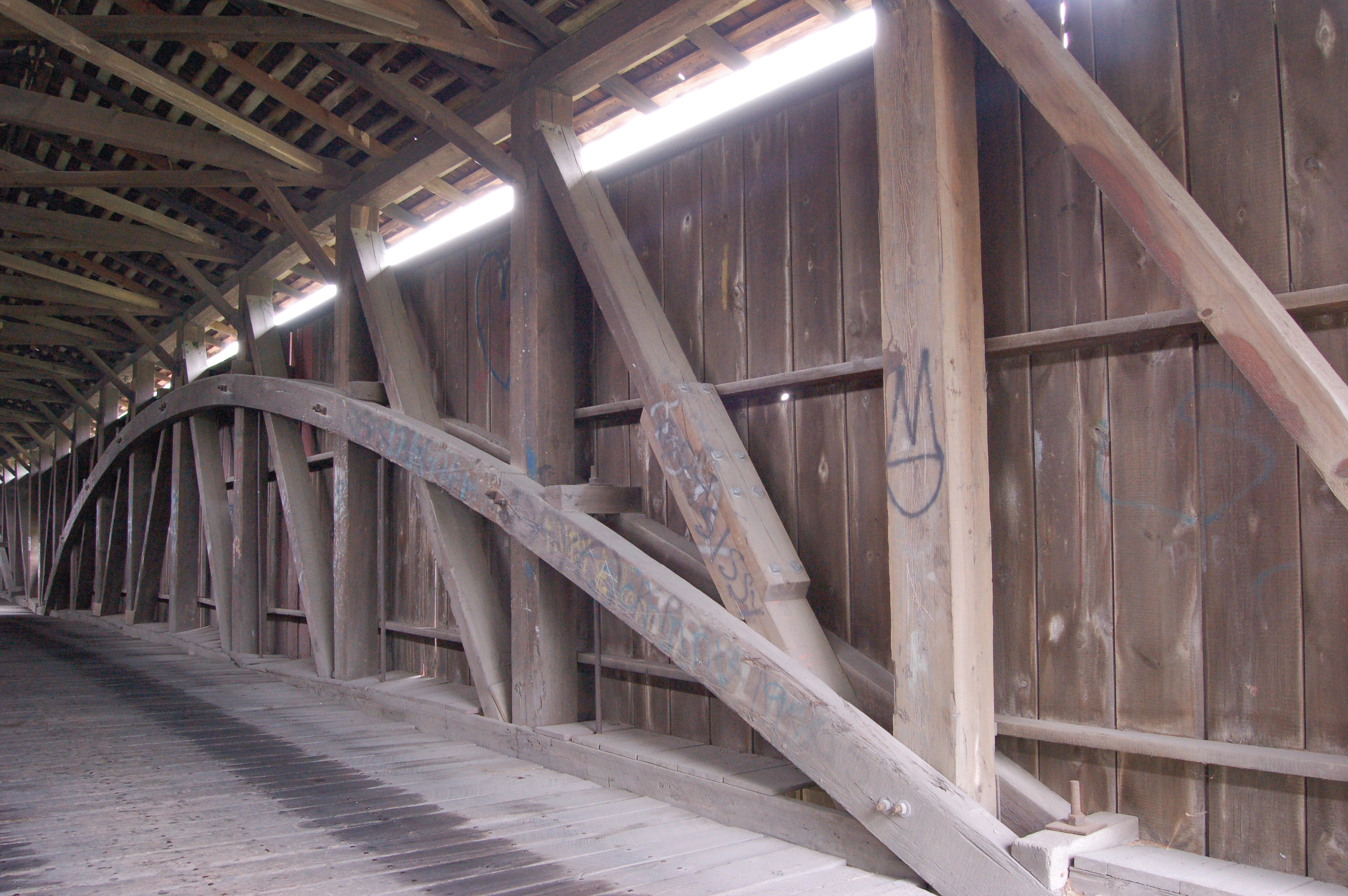
A closeup view of one of the arches

View of interior double arch

View from above and to the side

== See also ==
- Burr arch truss
- List of bridges documented by the Historic American Engineering Record in Pennsylvania
- List of Lancaster County covered bridges

== Bibliography ==
- McCain, Dr. Roger A. "Pine Grove Bridge". A Guide to Old Covered Bridges of Southeastern Pennsylvania and nearby areas.
- "Pine Grove Covered Bridge". Lancaster County Pennsylvania Dutch Country Official Visitors Center. Pennsylvania Dutch Convention & Visitors Bureau. 2006. Archived from the original on March 17, 2006.
- "The Covered Bridges of Lancaster County". Lancaster County, PA Government Portal. County of Lancaster, Pennsylvania. November 9, 2001. Archived from the original on December 26, 2005.
