= Elk Landing =

Historic house in Maryland, United States

- U.S. National Register of Historic Places
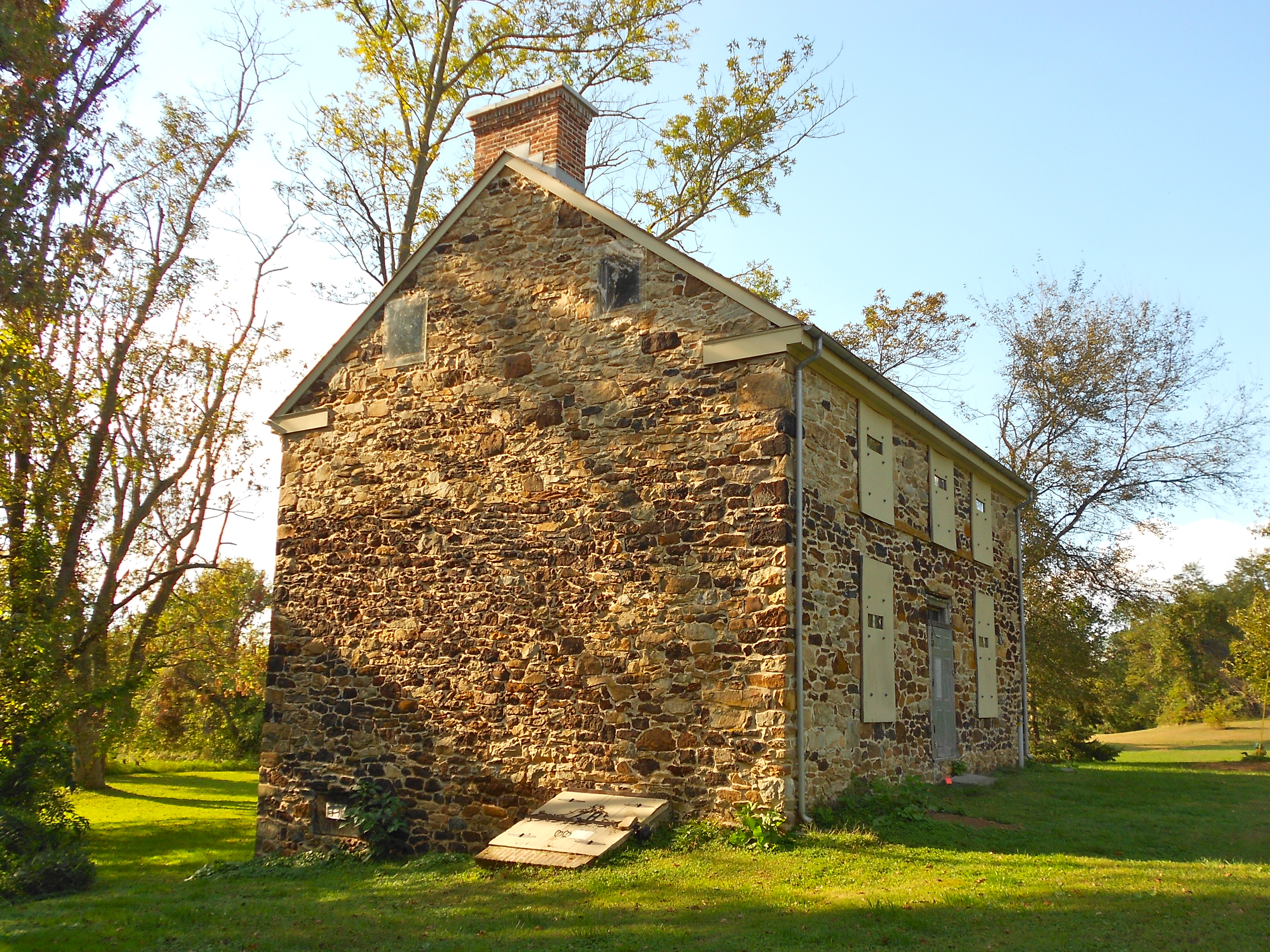
- Stone house in 2013

- Location within Maryland Location within the United States
- Location: Landing Lane, Elkton, Maryland
- Coordinates: 39°35′45″N 75°50′28″W
- Area: 0.8 acres (0.32 ha)
- Built: 1750
- NRHP reference No.: 84001596
- Added to NRHP: September 7, 1984

Elk Landing is a historic home located at Elkton, Cecil County, Maryland. The house at Elk Landing was listed on the National Register of Historic Places in 1984.

It is a two-story, fieldstone dwelling, three bays wide by two bays deep, with a gable roof dating to about 1780. Its interior features a corner fireplace in its northeast corner as well as a full basement. Interior doors and chair rail moldings in most of the rooms may also be original to the house.

The property on which the house is located was part of an early settlement of Swedish and Finnish immigrants. Elk Landing was the home, trading post and base of operations of the Swedish-American trader, John Hansson Steelman (1655–1749) who occupied the site from 1693. Steelman traded with the Indians of South Central Pennsylvania and Northern Maryland exchanging small items of housewares for animal pelts. Steelman's establishment was a trading post until about 1739 when the Shawnee moved westward into the Ohio and Allegheny River Valleys. It also included a dwelling and a tavern. Archeological excavations have discovered the remains of the original long house of John Hanson Steelman. The site is north of and adjacent to the stone house.

The site of Elk Landing is significant for its association with trade between the Scandinavian settlers and the Susquehannock, as well as with the history of early Swedish settlement in Maryland. Elk Landing was also the site of the arrival of the Lutheran priests, Andreas Rudman and Erik Bjork, who landed on June 24, 1697, to renew the work of the Church of Sweden started in the former New Sweden colony.

Zebulon Hollingsworth later acquired the land in 1735. The structures standing at Elk Landing date from the period of the Hollingsworth family, the Steelman structures were demolished around 1905.

== Related Reading ==
- Benson, Adolph B.; Naboth Hedin (1938) Swedes in America, 1638–1938 (New Haven, CT: Yale University Press) ISBN 978-0-8383-0326-9
- Louhi, E. A. (1925) The Delaware Finns or The First Permanent Settlements in Pennsylvania, Delaware, West New Jersey, and Eastern Part of Maryland (New York City: The Humanity Press Publishers)
- Weslager, C. A. (1988) New Sweden on the Delaware 1638–1655 (The Middle Atlantic Press, Wilmington) ISBN 0-912608-65-X
