= Petra Skogsberg =

Swedish handball player

Personal information
- Full name: Petra Maria Skogsberg
- Nationality: Swedish
- Born: 2 February 1984 (age 42) Eggby, Sweden
- Height: 1.63 m (5 ft 4 in)

Sport
- Sport: Handball
- Position: Left wing

Youth career
- Years: Team
- –: Skara HF

Senior clubs
- Years: Team
- 2002–2007: Skövde HF
- 2007–2008: Frederikshavn FOX Team Nord
- 2008–2010: GOG Svendborg
- 2010–2013: Lugi HF
- 2013–2015: Skara HF
National team
Years	Team	Apps	(Gls)
2005–2010	Sweden	64	(91)

Teams managed
- 2015–2020: Skara HF (assistant)

Petra Maria Skogsberg (born 2 February 1984) is a Swedish former handball player.

== Career ==
Skogsberg started her career at Skara HF, and joined Skövde HF at the age of 18..

In 2007 she became a professional player in Denmark, when she joined Frederikshavn FOX Team Nord. A year later she joined GOG Svendborg. Due to the club's economic problems, she returned to Sweden, where she played for Lugi HF.

In 2013 she returned to Skara HF, where she played for 2 years before retiring. She then became a coach at the club.

== National team ==
Skogsberg made her debut for the Swedish national team in 2005, and represented Sweden at the 2006 and 2008 European Championships, as well as the 2009 World Women's Handball Championship.

She played her last national team match in 2010.
