= Eggby =

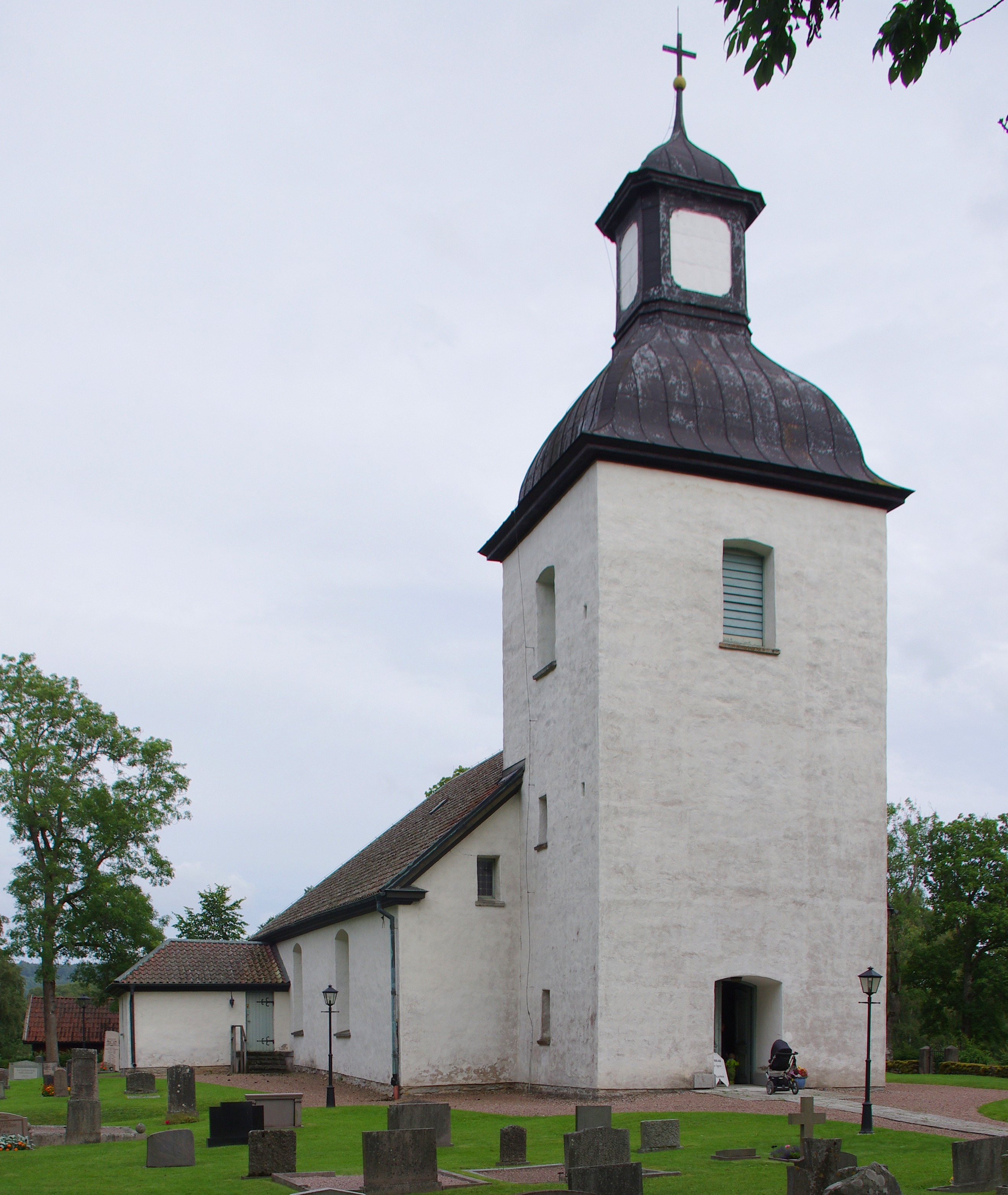
- Eggby church

- Location within Västra Götaland Location within Sweden
- Coordinates: 58°26′N 13°39′E
- Country: Sweden
- Province: Västergötland
- County: Västra Götaland County
- Municipality: Skara Municipality

Area
  - Total: 0.28 km^{2} (0.11 sq mi)

Population (31 December 2010)
  - Total: 231
  - Density: 822/km^{2} (2,130/sq mi)
- Time zone: UTC+1 (CET)
  - Summer (DST): UTC+2 (CEST)
- Climate: Dfb

Eggby is a locality situated in Skara Municipality, Västra Götaland County, Sweden with 231 inhabitants in 2010.

== Notable people ==
- Petra Maria Skogsberg, Swedish national team handball player
