= White Rock Forge Covered Bridge =

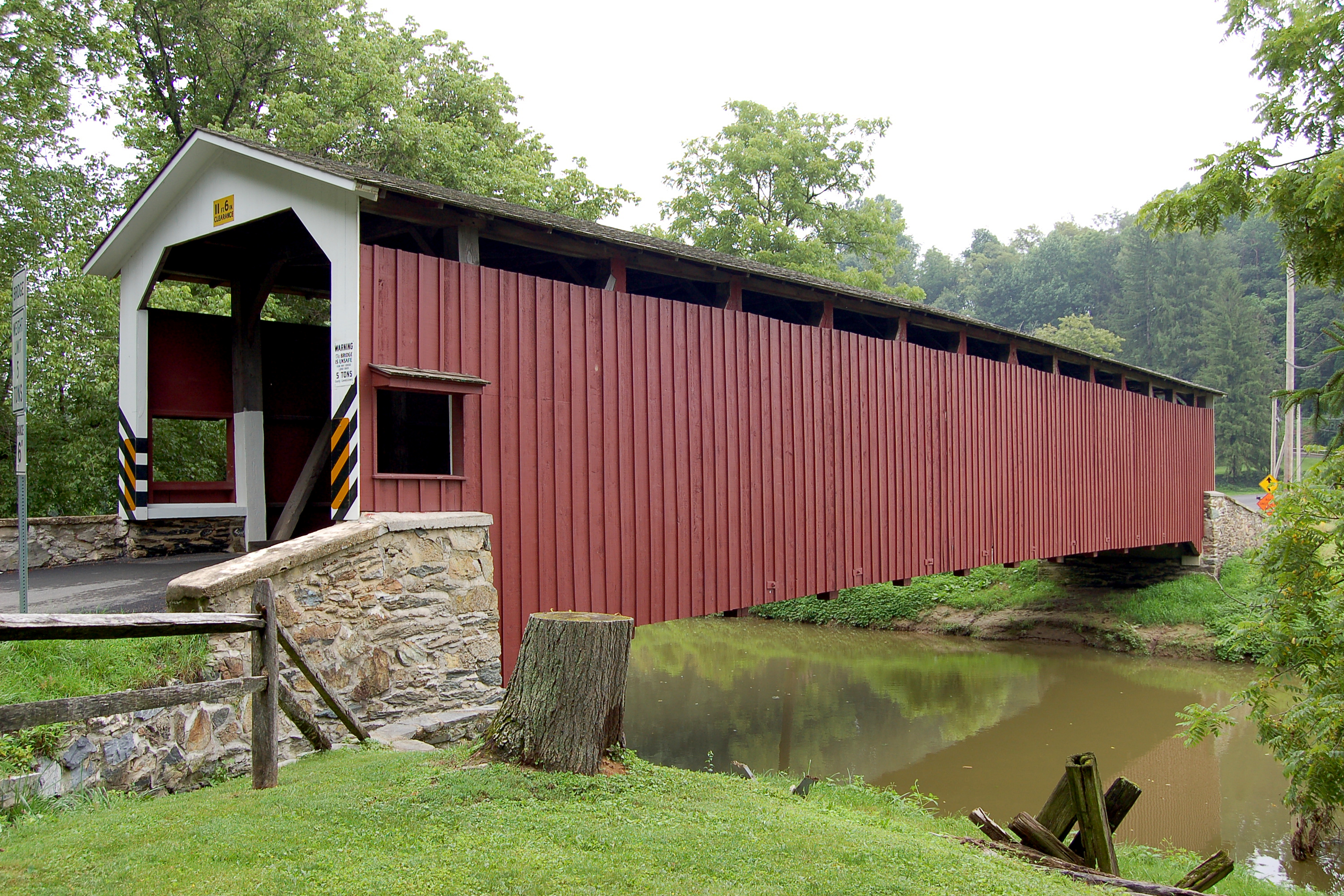
- Coordinates: 39.8247°N 76.0900°W
- Locale: Lancaster County, Pennsylvania, United States
- Official name: West Octoraro #2 Bridge

Characteristics
- Design: single span, double Burr arch truss
- Total length: 103 feet (31.4 m)

History
- Constructed by: John Russell and Elias McMellen
- Construction start: 1847
- Rebuilt: 1884
- White Rock Forge Covered Bridge
- U.S. National Register of Historic Places
- MPS: Covered Bridges of Lancaster County TR
- NRHP reference No.: 80003522
- Added to NRHP: December 10, 1980

Location
- Interactive map of White Rock Forge Covered Bridge

The White Rock Forge Covered Bridge or White Rock Covered Bridge is a covered bridge that spans the West Branch of the Octoraro Creek in southeast Lancaster County, Pennsylvania. A county-owned and maintained bridge, its official designation is the West Octoraro #2 Bridge. It was first constructed in 1847 by John Russell and Elias McMellen, but the original was destroyed by flooding, it is 103 feet long, and it was last rebuilt in 1884. The wooden burr bridge crosses the West Branch of the Octoraro Creek. It is 103 feet long and 13 feet wide.

The bridge has a single span, wooden, double Burr arch trusses design with the addition of steel hanger rods. The deck is made from oak planks. It is painted red, the traditional color of Lancaster County covered bridges, on both the inside and outside. Both approaches to the bridge are painted in the traditional white color.

The bridge's WGCB Number is 38-36-18. Added in 1980, it is listed on the National Register of Historic Places as structure number 80003522. It is located at 39°49′28.8″N 76°5′24″W (39.82467, -76.09000).

== Dimensions ==
- Length: 103 feet (31.4 m) span and 110 feet (33.5 m) total length
- Width: 13 feet (4.0 m) clear deck and 15 feet (4.6 m) total width
- Overhead clearance: 12 feet (3.7 m)
- Underclearance: 13 feet (4.0 m)

== Gallery ==
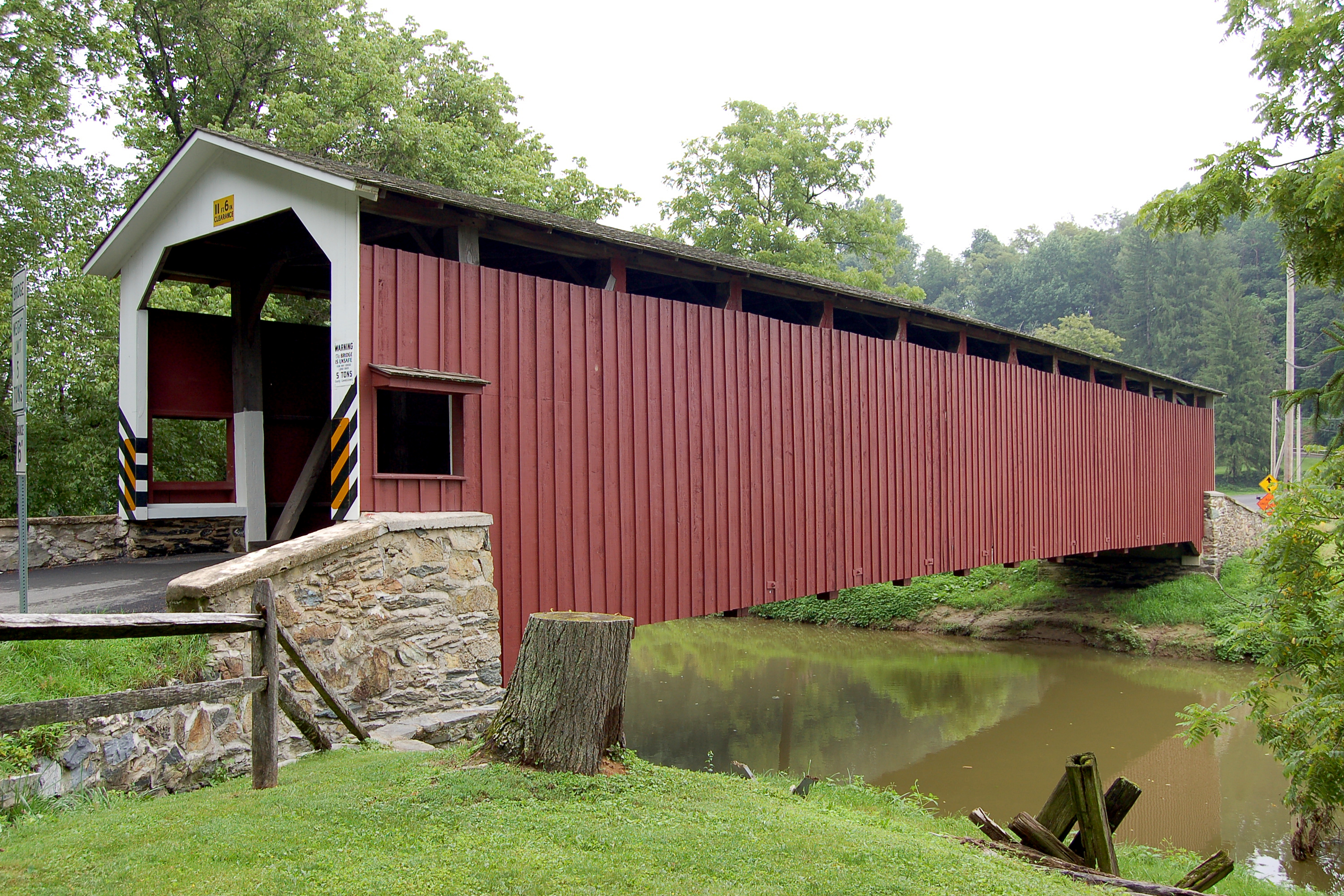
White Rock Forge covered bridge

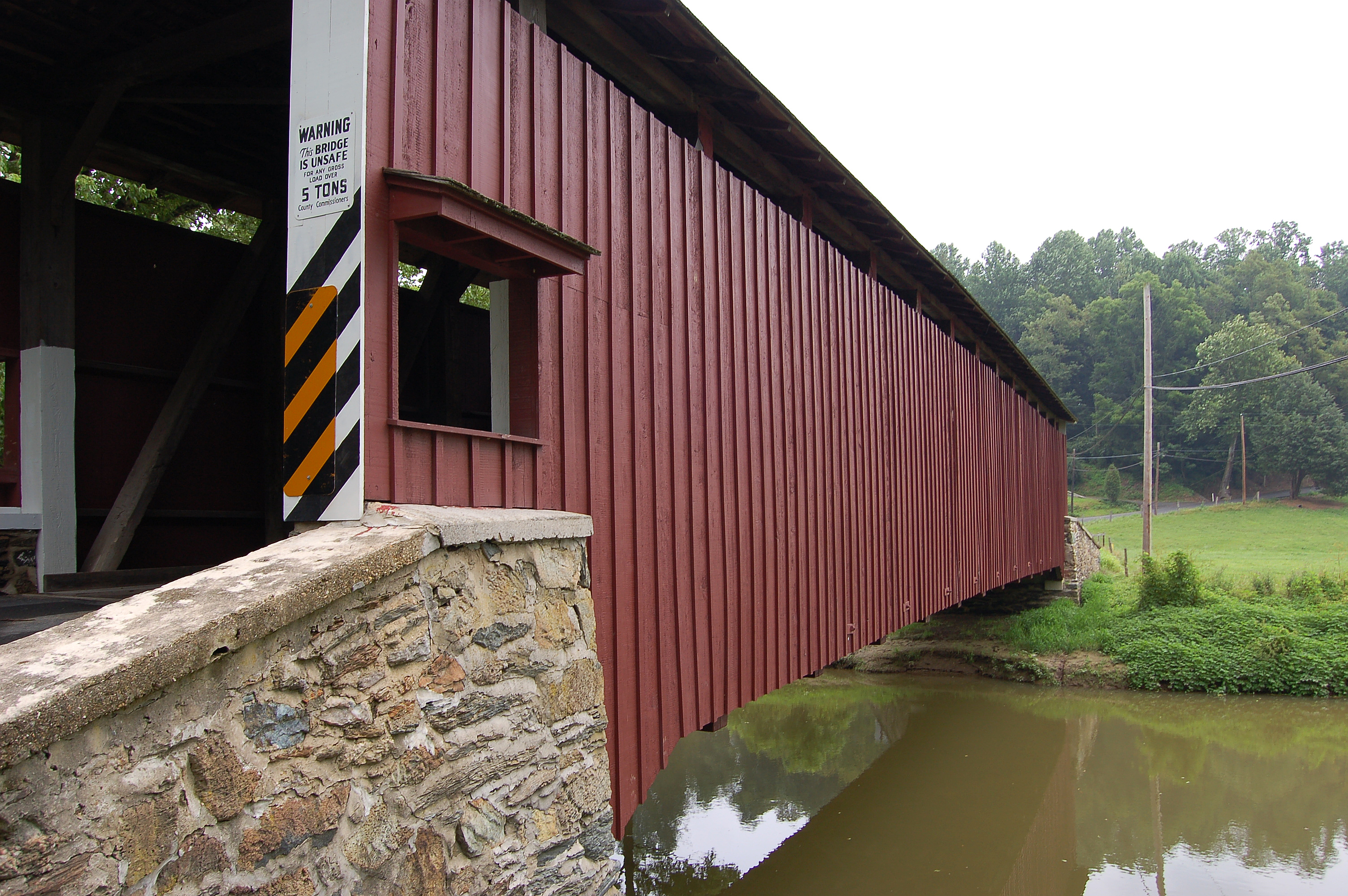
Side view of the bridge

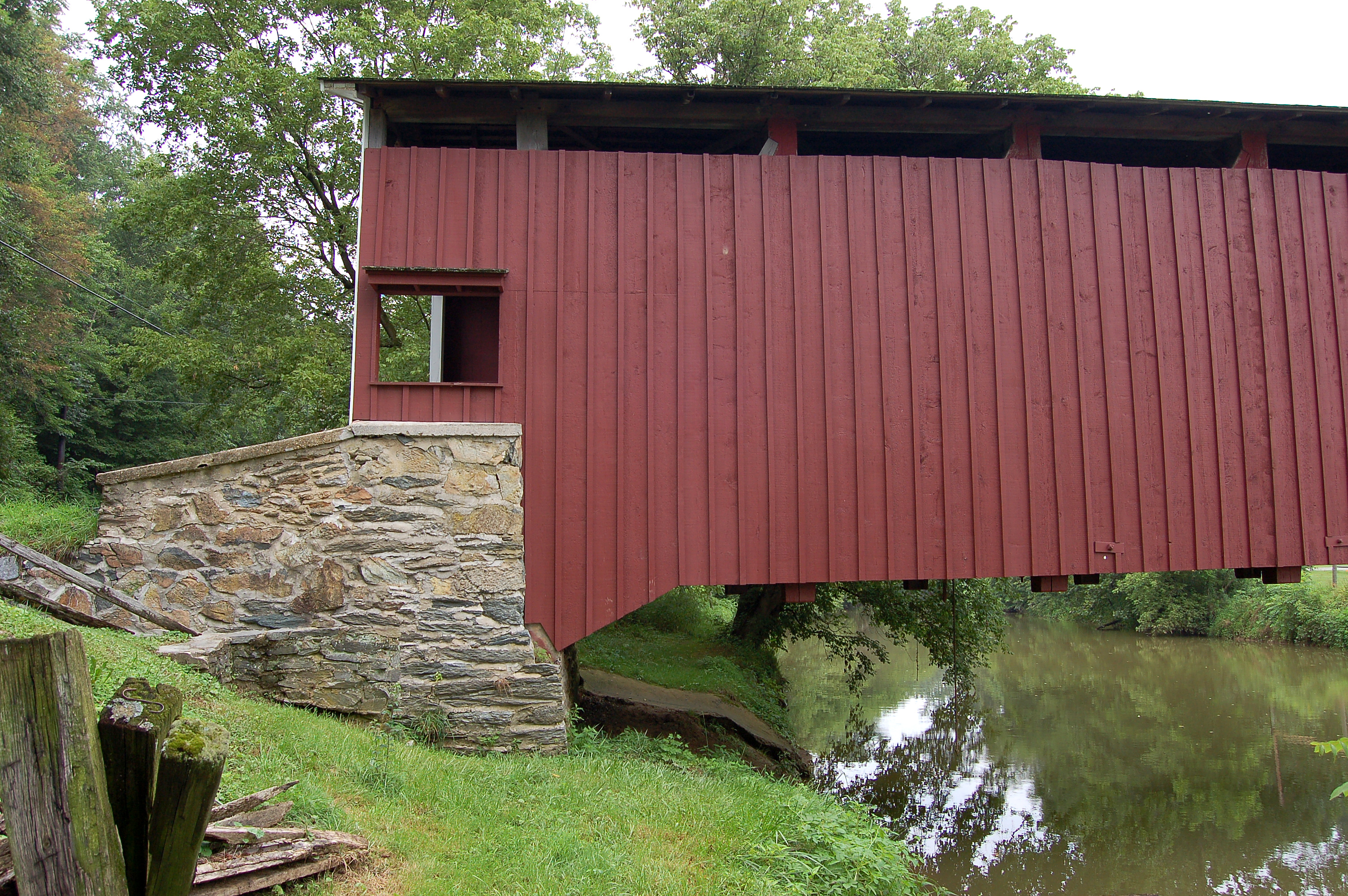
Window in the side of the bridge

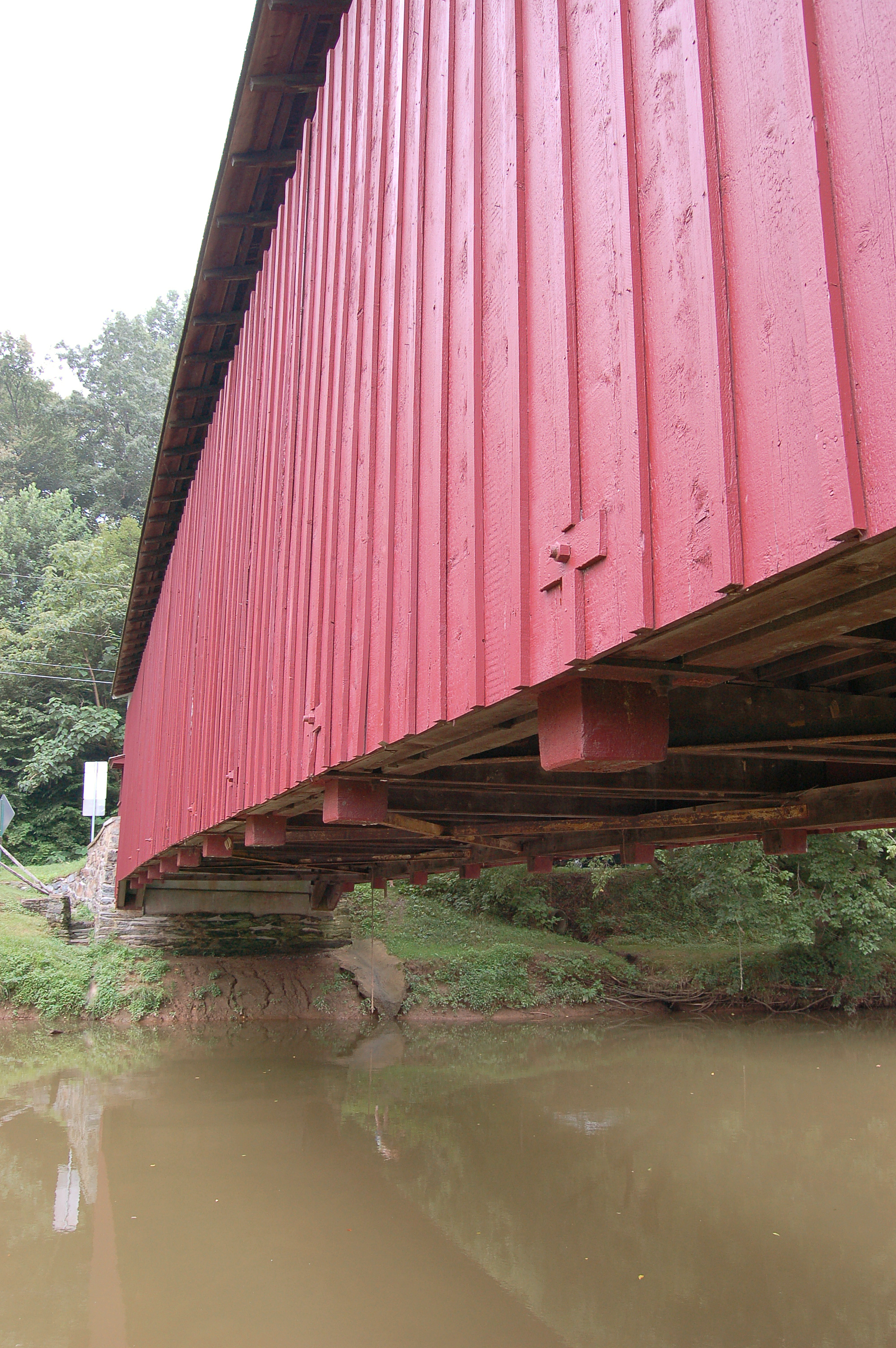
Side view of the bridge showing its underside

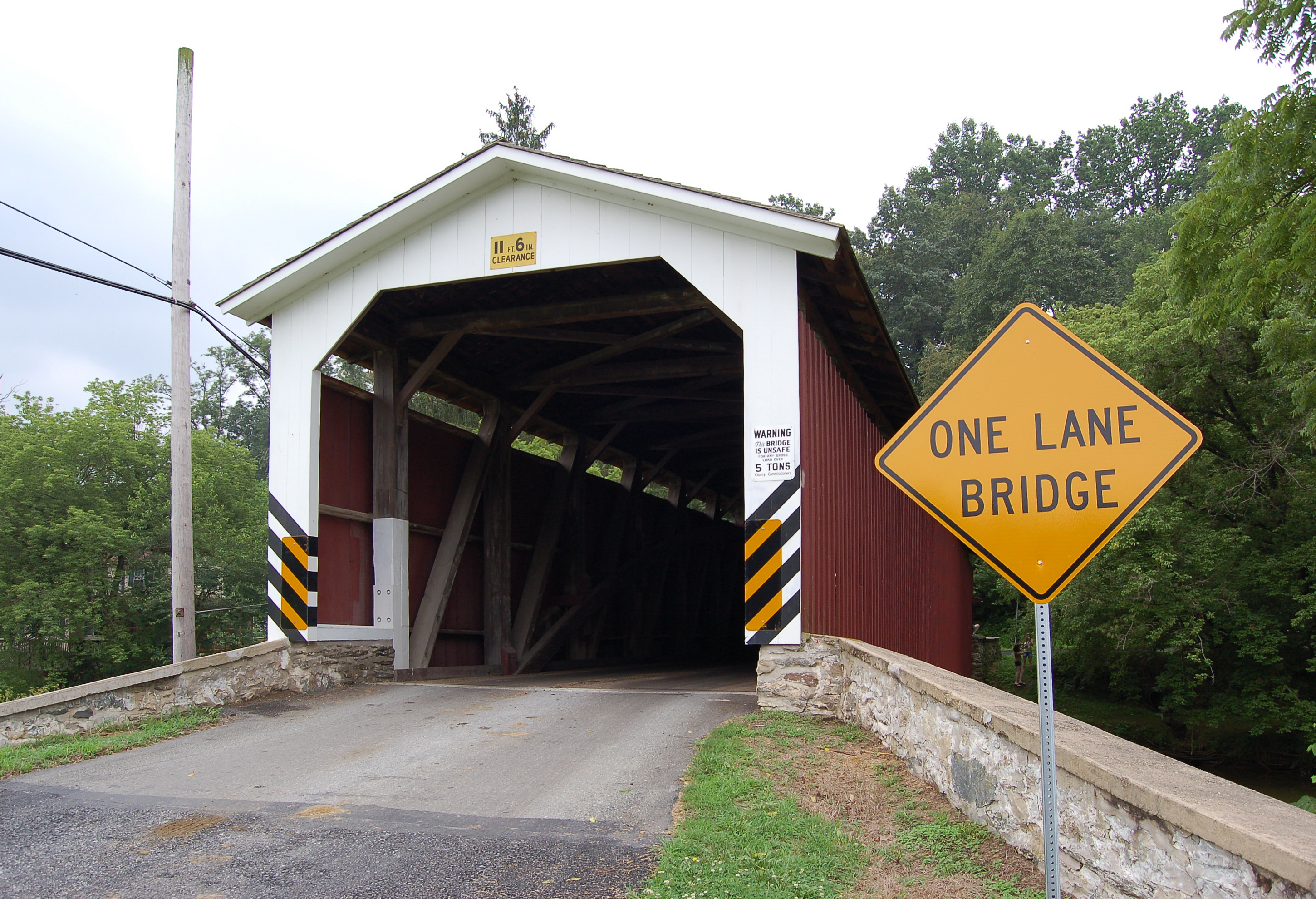
One of the approaches to the bridge

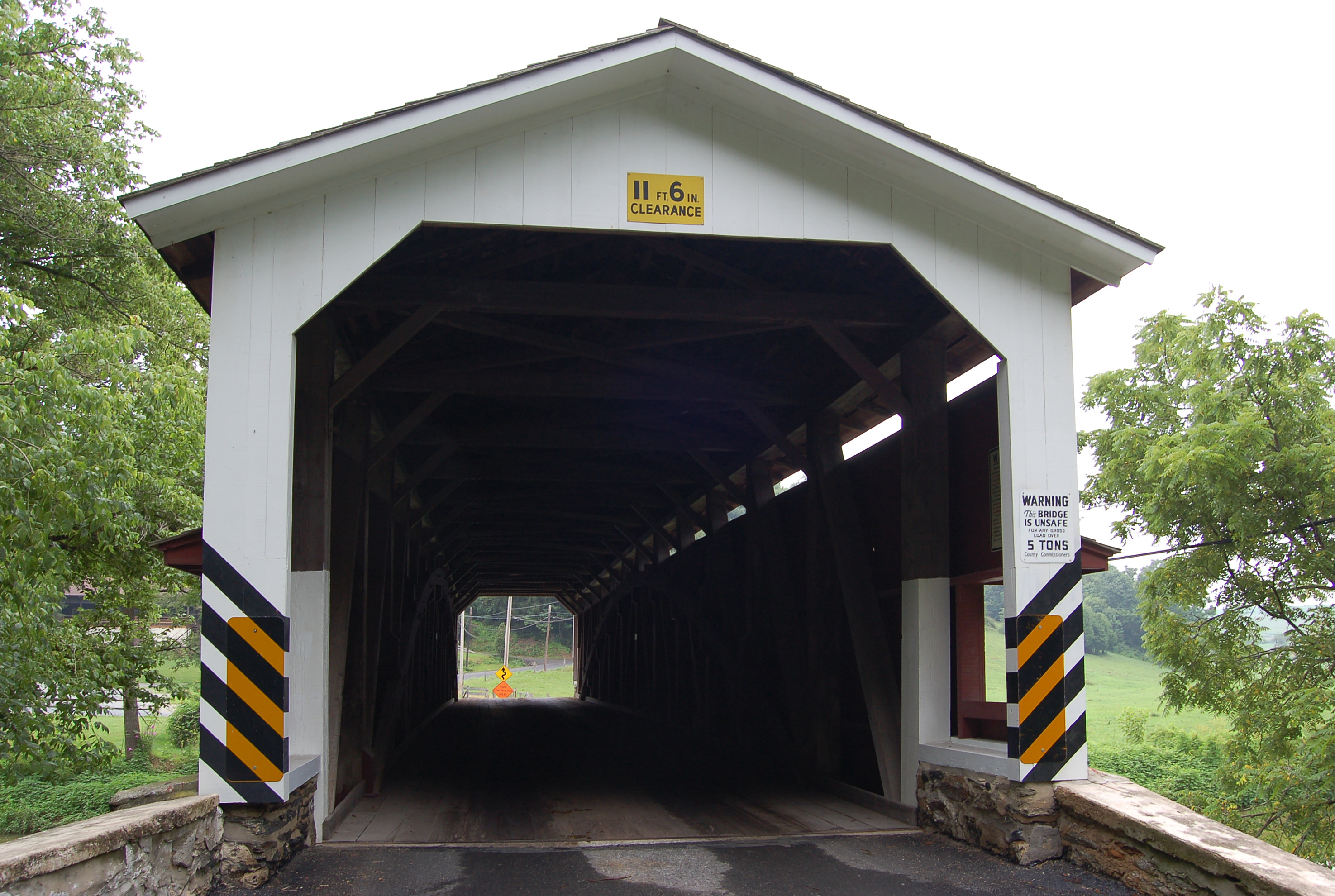
The other approach

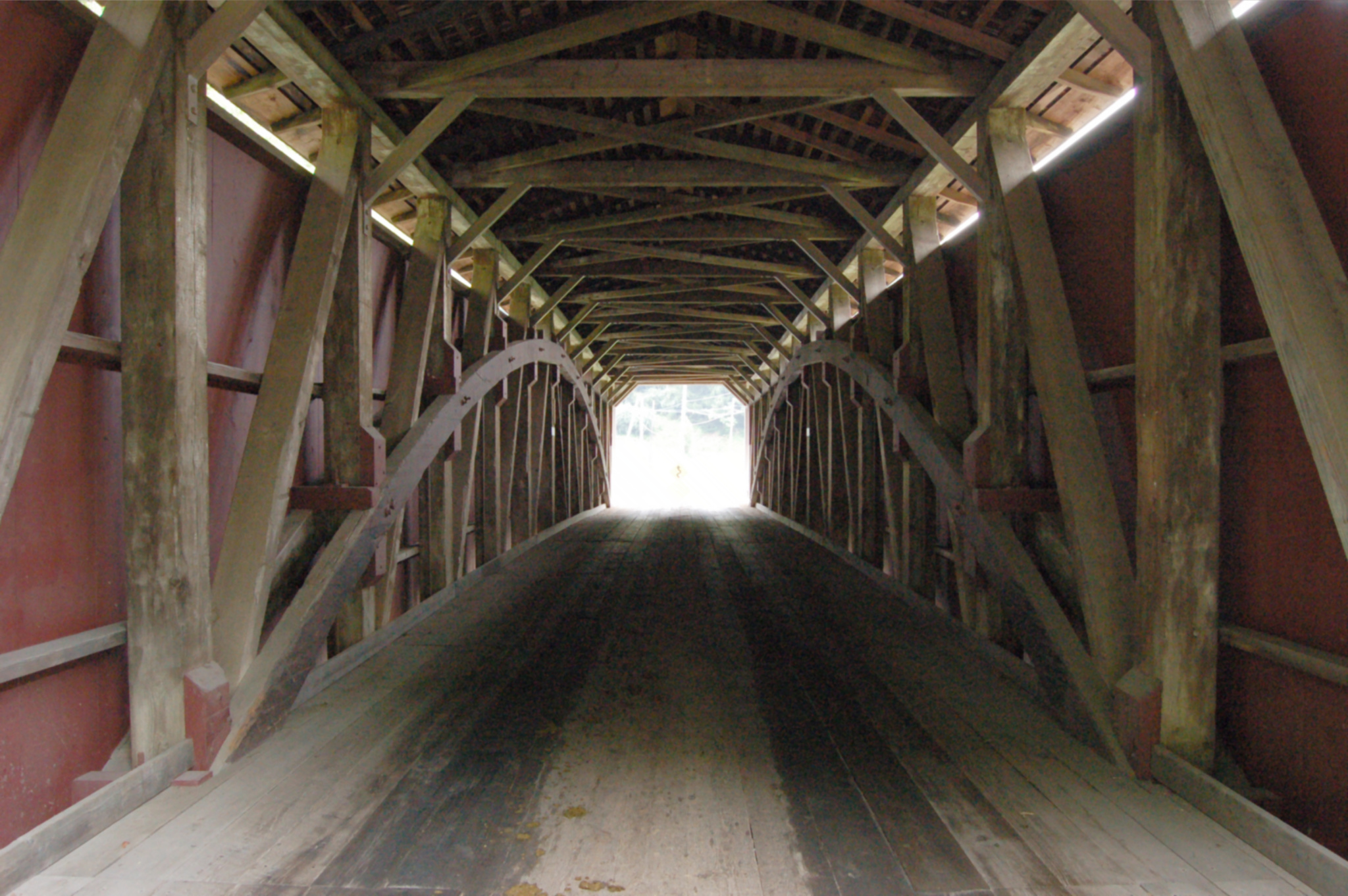
The inside of the bridge showing the Burr arch truss design

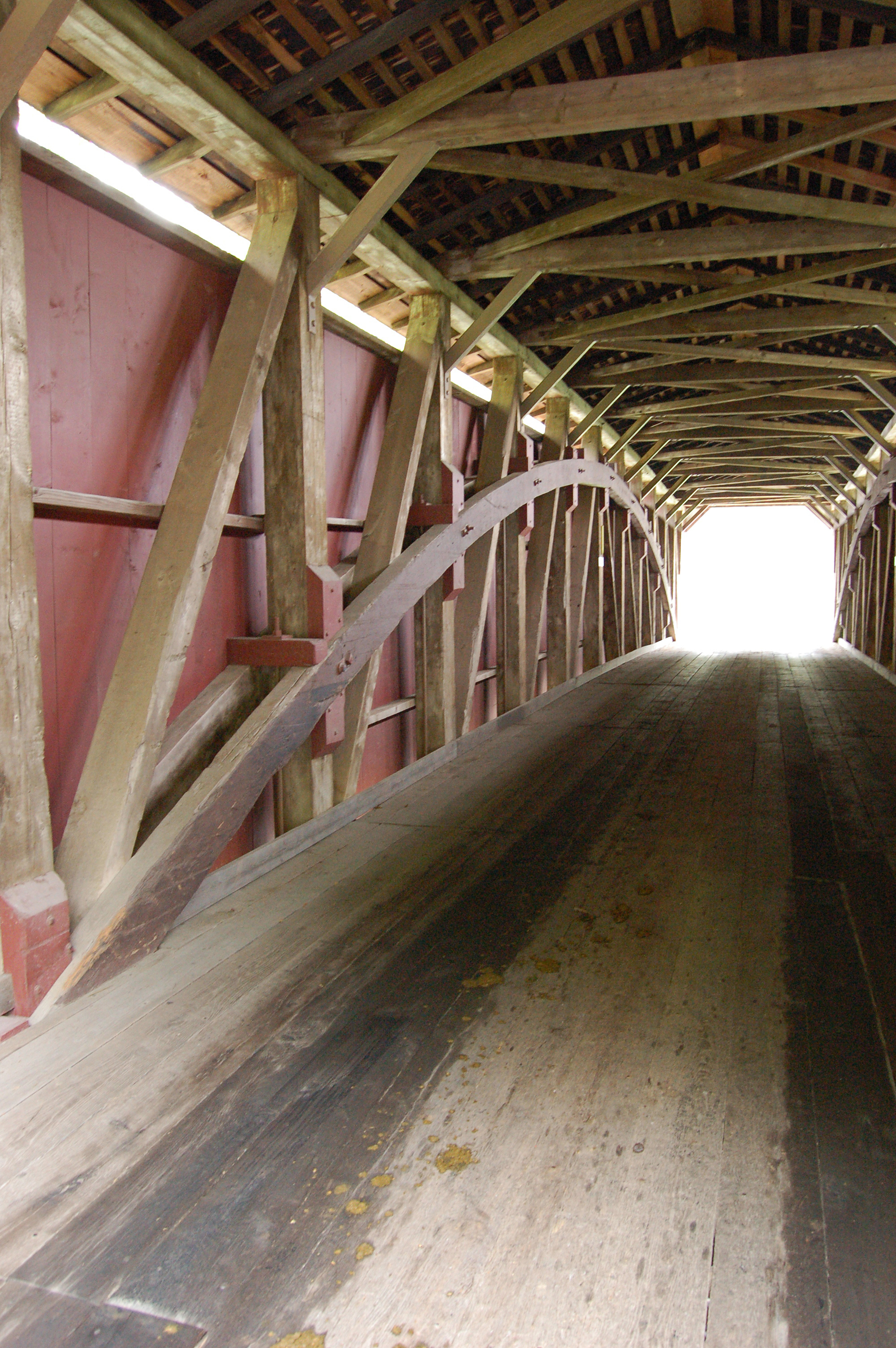
Closeup of the Burr arch truss

== See also ==
- Burr arch truss
- List of Lancaster County covered bridges
