= Skara Municipality =

Skara Municipality Skara kommun
- Municipality
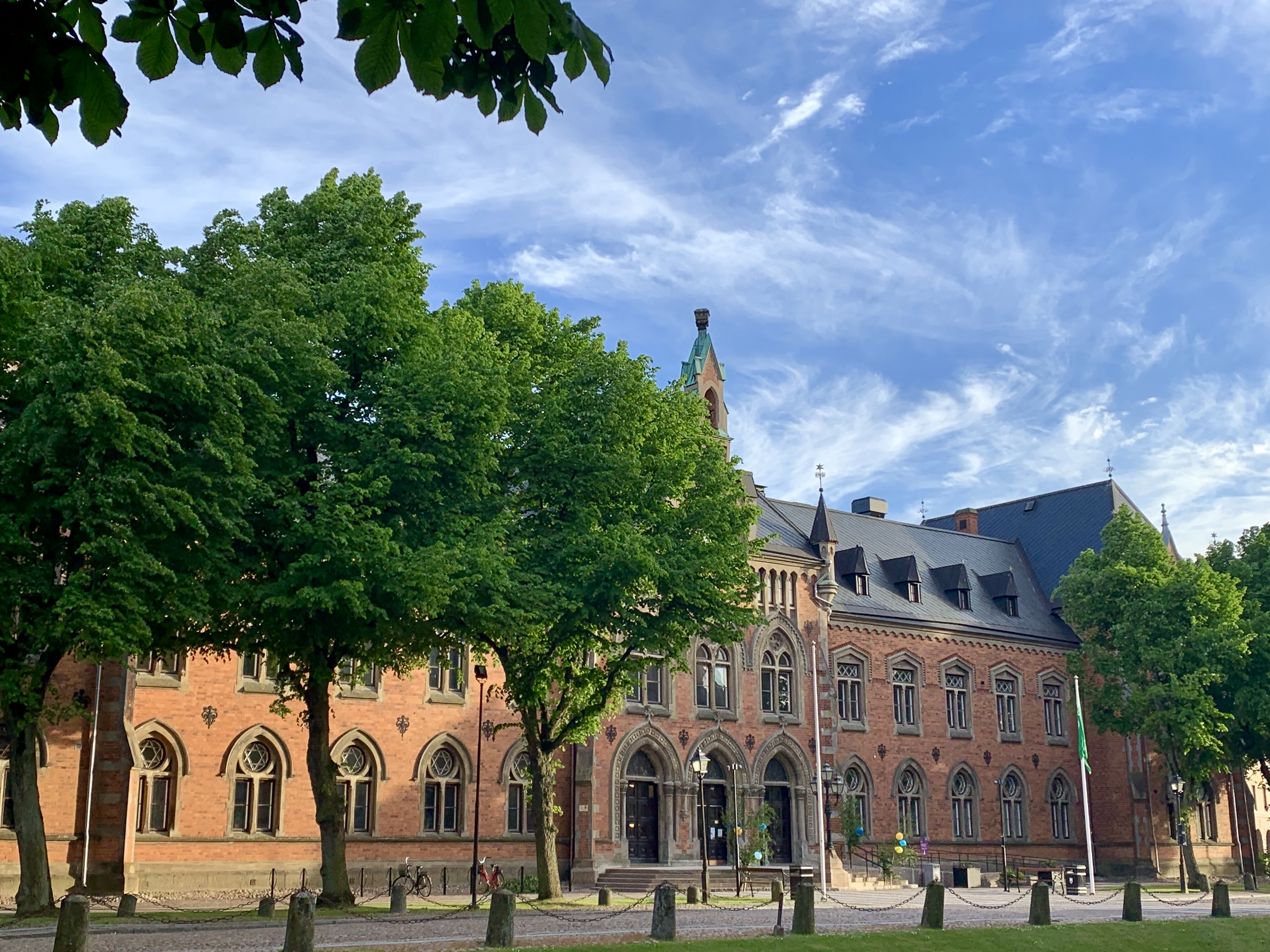
- Skara Town Hall

- Coat of arms

- Coordinates: 58°23′N 13°26′E
- Country: Sweden
- County: Västra Götaland County
- Seat: Skara

Area
  - Total: 448.69 km^{2} (173.24 sq mi)
  - Land: 428.65 km^{2} (165.50 sq mi)
  - Water: 20.04 km^{2} (7.74 sq mi)
- Area as of 1 January 2014.

Population (30 June 2025)
  - Total: 18,752
  - Density: 43.747/km^{2} (113.30/sq mi)
- Time zone: UTC+1 (CET)
  - Summer (DST): UTC+2 (CEST)
- ISO 3166 code: SE
- Province: Västergötland
- Municipal code: 1495
- Website: www.skara.se

Skara Municipality (Swedish: Skara kommun) is a municipality in Västra Götaland County in western Sweden. Its seat is located in the city of Skara.

The area of the municipality consists of 16 original local government entities. The municipal reform of 1952 grouped them into four new entities. In 1971 the City of Skara was amalgamated with the rural municipalities to form the present unit.

== Localities ==
- Ardala, pop. 745
- Axvall, pop 1 164
- Eggby, pop. 237
- Skara (seat), pop. 11 437
- Varnhem, pop. 662

Varnhem is renowned for its medieval monastery.

== Demographics ==
This is a demographic table based on Skara Municipality's electoral districts in the 2022 Swedish general election sourced from SVT's election platform, in turn taken from SCB official statistics.

In total there were 18,708 residents, including 14,210 Swedish citizens of voting age. 46.4% voted for the left coalition and 52.4% for the right coalition. Indicators are in percentage points except population totals and income.

Location	Residents	Citizen adults	Left vote	Right vote	Employed	Swedish parents	Foreign heritage	Income SEK	Degree
Location			%	%					
Ardala	1,724	1,334	35.9	62.7	88	92	8	26,494	27
Axvall	1,794	1,351	42.0	56.5	80	84	16	25,432	40
Centrum	1,725	1,306	51.2	47.3	66	63	37	18,978	30
Gällkvist V-Härlunda	1,883	1,435	45.7	53.3	82	83	17	25,619	29
Gällkvist Ö	1,527	1,207	43.2	55.9	85	87	13	27,279	31
Hindsbo-Händene	1,670	1,237	43.8	55.7	82	79	21	26,082	32
Marieberg	2,197	1,593	51.4	47.2	71	61	39	21,976	25
Skaraberg-Tveta	1,999	1,557	47.3	51.8	84	83	17	27,649	34
Varnhem-Eggby	2,045	1,625	49.4	49.1	89	92	8	28,115	49
Västermalm	2,144	1,565	51.1	47.9	71	67	33	21,806	39
Source: SVT

== See also ==
- Skaraborg County
- Diocese of Skara
- Hans Månsson
