= Octoraro Creek =

River in the United States

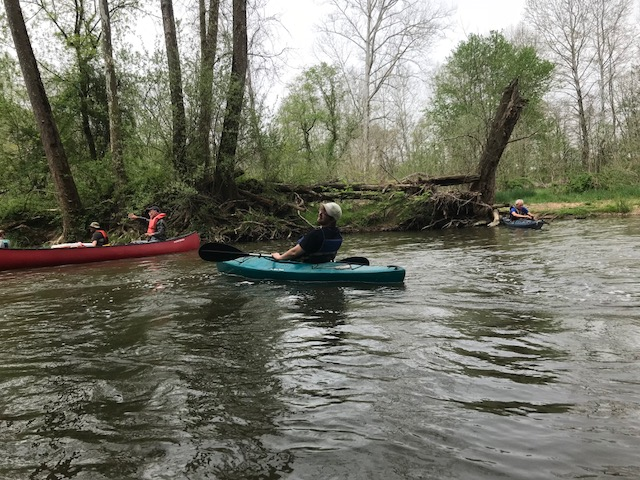
- Kayakers on Octoraro Creek

Location
- Country: United States
- State: Pennsylvania

Physical characteristics
- Source
  - location: Lancaster and Chester counties
- Mouth
  - location: Susquehanna River
  - coordinates: 39.6562°N 76.1587°W
- Discharge
  - location: Susquehanna River

Octoraro Creek is a 22.1-mile-long (35.6 km) tributary of the Susquehanna River, joining it 9 miles (14 km) above the Susquehanna's mouth at the Chesapeake Bay. The Octoraro rises as an East and West Branch in Pennsylvania. The East Branch and Octoraro Creek form the southern half of the border between Lancaster and Chester counties until the creek crosses the Mason–Dixon line. It winds through northwestern Cecil County, Maryland before joining the Susquehanna.

Each of the branches is less than 20 miles (32 km) long. The entire creek drains 208 square miles (540 km^{2}) of watershed. Octoraro Creek was designated a Pennsylvania Scenic River by Legislative Act 1983-43, managed by the Octoraro Creek Watershed Association. A brick tunnel leading to Octoraro Creek was built by Charles Spotts and used by slaves travelling the Underground Railway through Lancaster County, Pennsylvania.

== East Branch Octoraro Creek ==
The East Branch Octoraro Creek, 18.1 miles (29.1 km) long, starts at Christiana, Pennsylvania, created by the confluence of Williams Run and Pine Creek, which carries the Lancaster - Chester County border for about a mile. The East Branch continues the border with Lancaster County to the west and Chester County on the east bank. The branch enters a steep wooded valley and passes under the Mercer's Mill Covered Bridge at Bailey Crossroads Road. The branch continues through the valley which widens out near Steelville. The branch loops through another steep valley north of Homeville, which widens out before the creek passes under PA Route 896 at Andrews Bridge. Muddy Run joins the East Branch from the east out of its own set of steep valleys. The East Branch widens out into the eastern part of Lake Octoraro about 3 miles (5 km) northwest of Oxford, Pennsylvania.

== West Branch Octoraro Creek ==
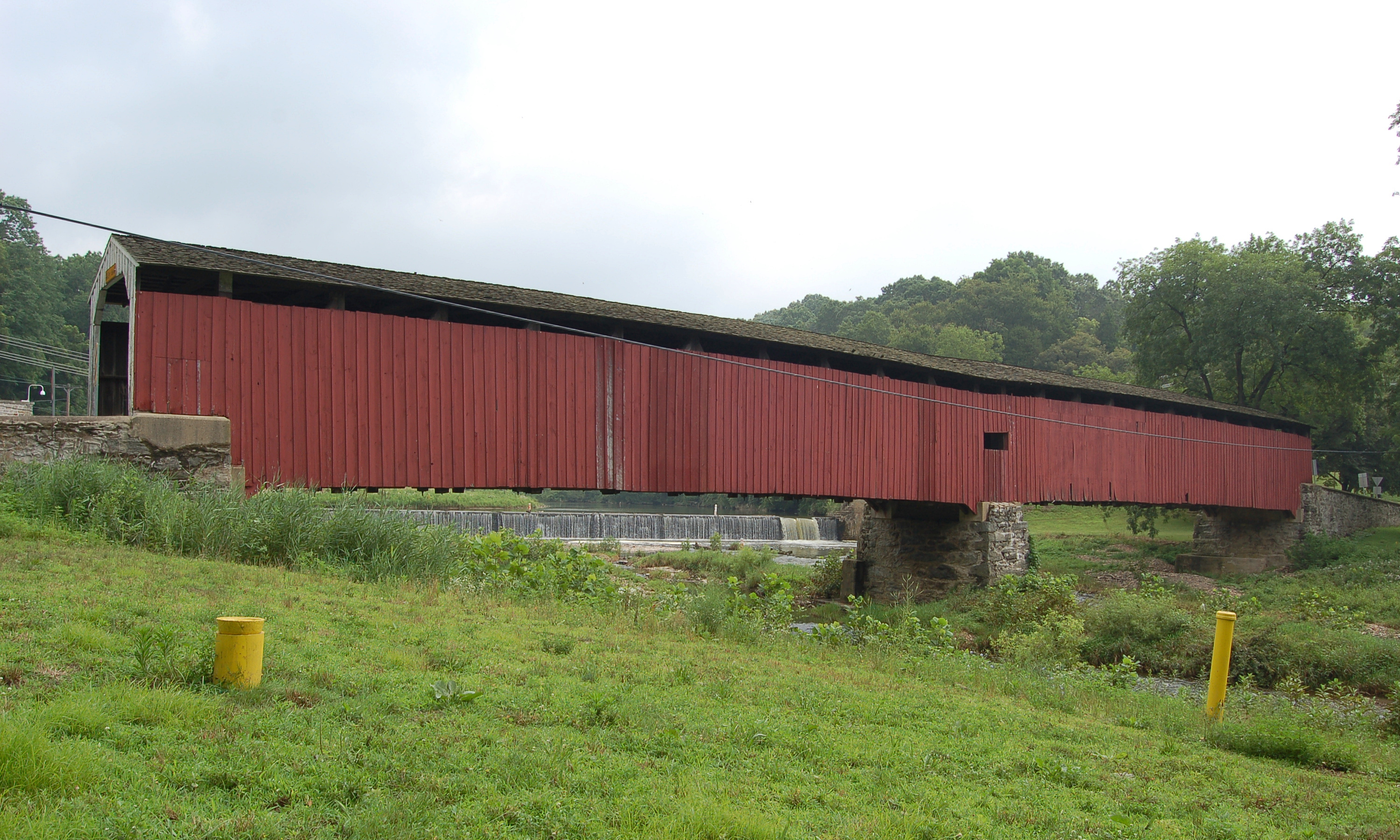
Pine Grove Covered Bridge with the dam of the Octoraro Lake Reservoir in the background

The West Branch Octoraro Creek runs 15.3 miles (24.6 km) entirely in Lancaster County. The branch, which starts about a mile south of Green Tree, is created by the confluence of Meetinghouse Creek, Mine Run, and a small unnamed creek which starts near the village of Ninepoints. The branch flows under the Jackson's Sawmill Covered Bridge, northwest of Bartville, then flows for a few miles through a narrow valley, southwest of Collins. The valley widens as the branch passes under Puseyville Road. The branch passes under Noble Road at Kings Bridge and under the White Rock Forge Covered Bridge at White Rock. The branch then widens out into the western part of Lake Octoraro about two miles east of Oak Shade.

== Main branch Octoraro Creek ==
The dam that forms Octoraro Lake is on the main branch, just below the East and West Branch confluence, in Pine Grove. Below the dam is a filtration plant belonging to the Chester Water Authority. The main branch passes under Pine Grove Covered Bridge (Forge Road) before continuing generally southwestward. The creek passes under PA Route 272 at Kirks Bridge, less than three miles west of Nottingham. As the creek nears the Pennsylvania - Maryland border it goes through a series of alternating loops. The final horseshoe-like loop, where the creek first crosses the border, gives the name to the Boy Scouts of America's Horseshoe Scout Reservation and the Chester County Council's Order of the Arrow Lodge. The west-bound portion of that loop passes over Grays Hollow Ford, now replaced by an Army Corps of Engineers bridge. At this point the contrast of the BSA wilderness camp on the left bank with the active gravel mine on the right is apparent. The horseshoe loops back to the east, then briefly north up into Pennsylvania, all within the Reservation, before it swings back south into Maryland for good. The Scout Reservation contains the original Mason-Dixon Line mile-19 stone monument, along with the remains of a former grist mill along the old camp road.

== Octoraro Creek in Maryland ==
In Maryland, Octoraro Creek winds generally southwest through a steep valley. The creek loops under the high tension lines from the Conowingo Hydroelectric Plant on their way toward Philadelphia and passes by the site of a removed dam. The creek crosses under U.S. Route 1 on that road's way from Philadelphia to the Conowingo Dam bridge and Baltimore. The creek then passes the washed-out Porters Bridge at Richardsmere and passes one final time under the high tension lines. At Rowlandsville, the creek passes under Doctor Jack Road and two abandoned railroad bridges on a defunct spur. The Octoraro passes under the active Norfolk Southern Railway bridge and Maryland Route 222 (formerly U.S. Route 222) before it reaches the Susquehanna River, below the Conowingo Dam. When the hydroelectric plant is not generating, along with a low tide (the Susquehanna experiences tides below the dam), the creek turns parallel to the river for a few hundred yards before joining. The six-foot rise in water when the hydroelectric plant is operating inundates this parallel stretch and can cause the Octoraro to reverse flow as far as the 222 bridge.

== See also ==
- List of Maryland rivers
- List of rivers of Pennsylvania
- Horseshoe Scout Reservation
