= 2010 Women's Junior World Handball Championship =

2010 Junior World Championship

Tournament details
- Host country: South Korea
- Venue(s): 4 (in 3 host cities)
- Dates: July 17–31
- Teams: 24 (from 5 confederations)

Final positions
- Champions: Norway (1st title)
- Runners-up: Russia
- Third place: Montenegro
- Fourth place: South Korea

Tournament statistics
- Matches played: 98
- Goals scored: 5,335 (54.44 per match)
- Top scorer(s): Nathalie Hagman (SWE) (75 goals)

Awards
- Best player: Lee Eun-bi (KOR)

The 2010 Women's Junior World Handball Championship (17th tournament) took place in South Korea from July 17 to July 31.

== Preliminary round ==
=== Group A ===
Team	Pld	W	D	L	GF	GA	GD	Pts
Norway	5	5	0	0	168	114	+54	10
Germany	5	3	1	1	146	122	+24	7
Serbia	5	3	0	2	164	127	+37	6
France	5	2	1	2	145	113	+32	5
Tunisia	5	1	0	4	142	176	−34	2
Greenland	5	0	0	5	85	198	−113	0

July 17; 15:00	Norway	43–24	Tunisia	Bicgoeul Gym, Gwangju; Attendance: 150; Referees: Carmen, Duta (ROU)
July 17; 15:00	Mørk 8	(24–10)	El Ghaoui 6	Bicgoeul Gym, Gwangju; Attendance: 150; Referees: Carmen, Duta (ROU)
July 17; 15:00	2× (yellow card)	Report	3× (yellow card) 2× (suspension)	Bicgoeul Gym, Gwangju; Attendance: 150; Referees: Carmen, Duta (ROU)

July 17; 17:00	France	47–12	Greenland	Bicgoeul Gym, Gwangju; Attendance: 200; Referees: Al Suwaidi, Bamutref (QAT)
July 17; 17:00	de la Breteche, Minko, Cisse 8	(25–4)	Tremel, Rasmussen, Holm, Egede, Gronvold 2	Bicgoeul Gym, Gwangju; Attendance: 200; Referees: Al Suwaidi, Bamutref (QAT)
July 17; 17:00	3× (yellow card) 1× (suspension)	Report	3× (yellow card) 3× (suspension)	Bicgoeul Gym, Gwangju; Attendance: 200; Referees: Al Suwaidi, Bamutref (QAT)

July 17; 19:00	Germany	29–27	Serbia	Bicgoeul Gym, Gwangju; Attendance: 500; Referees: Volodkov, Zotin (RUS)
July 17; 19:00	Grossmann 7	(13–13)	Trifunović 8	Bicgoeul Gym, Gwangju; Attendance: 500; Referees: Volodkov, Zotin (RUS)
July 17; 19:00	3× (yellow card) 3× (suspension)	Report	3× (yellow card) 4× (suspension)	Bicgoeul Gym, Gwangju; Attendance: 500; Referees: Volodkov, Zotin (RUS)

July 18; 15:00	Tunisia	25–29	France	Bicgoeul Gym, Gwangju; Attendance: 150; Referees: Al Marzouqi, Al Nuaimi (UAE)
July 18; 15:00	El Ghaoui 8	(11–13)	Minko 5	Bicgoeul Gym, Gwangju; Attendance: 150; Referees: Al Marzouqi, Al Nuaimi (UAE)
July 18; 15:00	3× (yellow card) 1× (suspension)	Report	3× (yellow card) 4× (suspension)	Bicgoeul Gym, Gwangju; Attendance: 150; Referees: Al Marzouqi, Al Nuaimi (UAE)

July 18; 17:00	Serbia	25–27	Norway	Bicgoeul Gym, Gwangju; Attendance: 175; Referees: Herczeg, Sudi (HUN)
July 18; 17:00	Živković 9	(11–15)	Mørk 7	Bicgoeul Gym, Gwangju; Attendance: 175; Referees: Herczeg, Sudi (HUN)
July 18; 17:00	3× (yellow card) 2× (suspension)	Report	3× (yellow card) 2× (suspension)	Bicgoeul Gym, Gwangju; Attendance: 175; Referees: Herczeg, Sudi (HUN)

July 18; 19:00	Greenland	12–36	Germany	Bicgoeul Gym, Gwangju; Attendance: 110; Referees: Elsayed, Zidan (EGY)
July 18; 19:00	Rasmussen 5	(3–16)	Grossmann 7	Bicgoeul Gym, Gwangju; Attendance: 110; Referees: Elsayed, Zidan (EGY)
July 18; 19:00	2× (yellow card) 2× (suspension)	Report	2× (yellow card) 4× (suspension)	Bicgoeul Gym, Gwangju; Attendance: 110; Referees: Elsayed, Zidan (EGY)

July 19; 15:00	Norway	38–19	Greenland	Bicgoeul Gym, Gwangju; Referees: Al Marzouqi, Al Nuaimi (UAE)
July 19; 15:00	Nørstebø 10	(15–10)	Rasmussen 8	Bicgoeul Gym, Gwangju; Referees: Al Marzouqi, Al Nuaimi (UAE)
July 19; 15:00	3× (yellow card) 2× (suspension)	Report	3× (yellow card) 1× (suspension)	Bicgoeul Gym, Gwangju; Referees: Al Marzouqi, Al Nuaimi (UAE)

July 19; 17:00	France	25–25	Germany	Bicgoeul Gym, Gwangju; Attendance: 500; Referees: Herczeg, Sudi (HUN)
July 19; 17:00	Prudhomme 8	(14–14)	Zapf 7	Bicgoeul Gym, Gwangju; Attendance: 500; Referees: Herczeg, Sudi (HUN)
July 19; 17:00	3× (yellow card) 2× (suspension)	Report	2× (yellow card) 3× (suspension)	Bicgoeul Gym, Gwangju; Attendance: 500; Referees: Herczeg, Sudi (HUN)

July 19; 19:00	Tunisia	32–47	Serbia	Bicgoeul Gym, Gwangju; Referees: Coulibaly, Diabate (CIV)
July 19; 19:00	Daoula 11	(13–18)	Živković, Trifunović 9	Bicgoeul Gym, Gwangju; Referees: Coulibaly, Diabate (CIV)
July 19; 19:00	3× (yellow card) 3× (suspension)	Report	3× (yellow card) 4× (suspension)	Bicgoeul Gym, Gwangju; Referees: Coulibaly, Diabate (CIV)

July 21; 15:00	France	21–26	Serbia	Bicgoeul Gym, Gwangju; Attendance: 100; Referees: Carmen, Duta (ROU)
July 21; 15:00	Manach 6	(7–16)	Cvijić 8	Bicgoeul Gym, Gwangju; Attendance: 100; Referees: Carmen, Duta (ROU)
July 21; 15:00	3× (yellow card)	Report	2× (yellow card) 4× (suspension)	Bicgoeul Gym, Gwangju; Attendance: 100; Referees: Carmen, Duta (ROU)

July 21; 17:00	Germany	23–35	Norway	Bicgoeul Gym, Gwangju; Attendance: 250; Referees: Coulibaly, Diabate (CIV)
July 21; 17:00	Zapf 5	(13–19)	Molid 6	Bicgoeul Gym, Gwangju; Attendance: 250; Referees: Coulibaly, Diabate (CIV)
July 21; 17:00	3× (yellow card) 1× (suspension)	Report	1× (yellow card)	Bicgoeul Gym, Gwangju; Attendance: 250; Referees: Coulibaly, Diabate (CIV)

July 21; 19:00	Greenland	24–38	Tunisia	Bicgoeul Gym, Gwangju; Attendance: 50; Referees: Al Suwaidi, BAmutref (QAT)
July 21; 19:00	Ivaana Holm 9	(9–18)	El Ghaoui, Daoula 6	Bicgoeul Gym, Gwangju; Attendance: 50; Referees: Al Suwaidi, BAmutref (QAT)
July 21; 19:00	3× (yellow card) 4× (suspension)	Report	3× (yellow card) 4× (suspension)	Bicgoeul Gym, Gwangju; Attendance: 50; Referees: Al Suwaidi, BAmutref (QAT)

July 22; 15:00	Serbia	39–18	Greenland	Bicgoeul Gym, Gwangju; Attendance: 300; Referees: Elsayed, Zidan (EGY)
July 22; 15:00	Popovic, Vasic, Radojevic 6	(20–6)	Holm 4	Bicgoeul Gym, Gwangju; Attendance: 300; Referees: Elsayed, Zidan (EGY)
July 22; 15:00	2× (yellow card) 1× (suspension)	Report	3× (yellow card) 2× (suspension)	Bicgoeul Gym, Gwangju; Attendance: 300; Referees: Elsayed, Zidan (EGY)

July 22; 17:00	Germany	33–23	Tunisia	Bicgoeul Gym, Gwangju; Attendance: 300; Referees: Volodkov, Zotin (RUS)
July 22; 17:00	Muller, Schirmer, Naidzinavicius 7	(15–15)	Dhaouadi 5	Bicgoeul Gym, Gwangju; Attendance: 300; Referees: Volodkov, Zotin (RUS)
July 22; 17:00	3× (yellow card) 2× (suspension)	Report	3× (yellow card) 1× (suspension)	Bicgoeul Gym, Gwangju; Attendance: 300; Referees: Volodkov, Zotin (RUS)

July 22; 19:00	Norway	25–23	France	Bicgoeul Gym, Gwangju; Attendance: 500; Referees: Herczeg, Sudi (HUN)
July 22; 19:00	Mørk 7	(14–14)	Kamdop 7	Bicgoeul Gym, Gwangju; Attendance: 500; Referees: Herczeg, Sudi (HUN)
July 22; 19:00	3× (yellow card) 1× (suspension)	Report	3× (yellow card) 1× (suspension)	Bicgoeul Gym, Gwangju; Attendance: 500; Referees: Herczeg, Sudi (HUN)

=== Group B ===
Team	Pld	W	D	L	GF	GA	GD	Pts
South Korea	5	5	0	0	176	131	+45	10
Netherlands	5	3	1	1	177	131	+46	7
Croatia	5	3	1	1	151	115	+36	7
Argentina	5	2	0	3	155	152	+3	4
China	5	1	0	4	111	160	−49	2
DR Congo	5	0	0	5	101	182	−81	0

July 17; 14:00	South Korea	34–19	China	Yeomju Gymnasium, Gwangju; Attendance: 500; Referees: Herczeg, Sudi (HUN)
July 17; 14:00	Lee 6	(11–8)	Zhao, Wu, Li, Tao 3	Yeomju Gymnasium, Gwangju; Attendance: 500; Referees: Herczeg, Sudi (HUN)
July 17; 14:00	3× (yellow card) 6× (suspension)	Report	2× (yellow card) 3× (suspension)	Yeomju Gymnasium, Gwangju; Attendance: 500; Referees: Herczeg, Sudi (HUN)

July 17; 16:00	Netherlands	23–23	Croatia	Yeomju Gymnasium, Gwangju; Attendance: 200; Referees: Coulibaly, Diabate (CIV)
July 17; 16:00	van der Heijden 12	(12–14)	Poljak, Franković 5	Yeomju Gymnasium, Gwangju; Attendance: 200; Referees: Coulibaly, Diabate (CIV)
July 17; 16:00	3× (yellow card) 5× (suspension)	Report	2× (yellow card) 5× (suspension)	Yeomju Gymnasium, Gwangju; Attendance: 200; Referees: Coulibaly, Diabate (CIV)

July 17; 18:00	Argentina	38–19	DR Congo	Yeomju Gymnasium, Gwangju; Referees: Elsayed, Zidan (EGY)
July 17; 18:00	Mendoza 9	(22–10)	Kabedi, Kapende 4	Yeomju Gymnasium, Gwangju; Referees: Elsayed, Zidan (EGY)
July 17; 18:00	3× (yellow card) 2× (suspension)	Report	3× (yellow card) 5× (suspension)	Yeomju Gymnasium, Gwangju; Referees: Elsayed, Zidan (EGY)

July 18; 15:00	DR Congo	18–37	South Korea	Yeomju Gymnasium, Gwangju; Attendance: 500; Referees: Volodkov, Zotin (RUS)
July 18; 15:00	Babina 6	(7–20)	Jung, Kim 6	Yeomju Gymnasium, Gwangju; Attendance: 500; Referees: Volodkov, Zotin (RUS)
July 18; 15:00	3× (yellow card) 7× (suspension)	Report	3× (yellow card) 4× (suspension)	Yeomju Gymnasium, Gwangju; Attendance: 500; Referees: Volodkov, Zotin (RUS)

July 18; 17:00	China	23–42	Netherlands	Yeomju Gymnasium, Gwangju; Referees: Christiansen, Lythje (DEN)
July 18; 17:00	Sun 8	(11–23)	Polman 7	Yeomju Gymnasium, Gwangju; Referees: Christiansen, Lythje (DEN)
July 18; 17:00	2× (yellow card) 9× (suspension)	Report	3× (yellow card) 4× (suspension)	Yeomju Gymnasium, Gwangju; Referees: Christiansen, Lythje (DEN)

July 18; 19:00	Croatia	30–28	Argentina	Yeomju Gymnasium, Gwangju; Referees: Al Suwaidi, Bamutref (QAT)
July 18; 19:00	Milić 6	(15–13)	Mendoza 10	Yeomju Gymnasium, Gwangju; Referees: Al Suwaidi, Bamutref (QAT)
July 18; 19:00	3× (yellow card) 8× (suspension)	Report	3× (yellow card) 4× (suspension)	Yeomju Gymnasium, Gwangju; Referees: Al Suwaidi, Bamutref (QAT)

July 19; 14:10	South Korea	35–32	Croatia	Yeomju Gymnasium, Gwangju; Referees: Christiansen, Lythje (DEN)
July 19; 14:10	Jo 8	(20–12)	Ježić 9	Yeomju Gymnasium, Gwangju; Referees: Christiansen, Lythje (DEN)
July 19; 14:10	3× (yellow card) 8× (suspension)	Report	4× (yellow card) 5× (suspension)	Yeomju Gymnasium, Gwangju; Referees: Christiansen, Lythje (DEN)

July 19; 16:10	Netherlands	43–25	Argentina	Yeomju Gymnasium, Gwangju; Referees: Volodkov, Zotin (RUS)
July 19; 16:10	van der Heijden 6	(22–13)	Mendoza 8	Yeomju Gymnasium, Gwangju; Referees: Volodkov, Zotin (RUS)
July 19; 16:10	3× (yellow card) 9× (suspension)	Report	3× (yellow card) 7× (suspension)	Yeomju Gymnasium, Gwangju; Referees: Volodkov, Zotin (RUS)

July 19; 18:10	China	32–22	DR Congo	Yeomju Gymnasium, Gwangju; Referees: Carmen, Duta (ROU)
July 19; 18:10	Wu 10	(15–9)	Katete, Kabedi, Laying 4	Yeomju Gymnasium, Gwangju; Referees: Carmen, Duta (ROU)
July 19; 18:10	3× (yellow card) 1× (suspension)	Report	3× (yellow card) 3× (suspension)	Yeomju Gymnasium, Gwangju; Referees: Carmen, Duta (ROU)

July 21; 15:00	Argentina	32–36	South Korea	Yeomju Gymnasium, Gwangju; Referees: Al Marzouqi, Al Nuaimi (UAE)
July 21; 15:00	Mendoza 10	(14–20)	Ryu 8	Yeomju Gymnasium, Gwangju; Referees: Al Marzouqi, Al Nuaimi (UAE)
July 21; 15:00	2× (yellow card) 3× (suspension)	Report	3× (yellow card) 3× (suspension)	Yeomju Gymnasium, Gwangju; Referees: Al Marzouqi, Al Nuaimi (UAE)

July 21; 17:00	Netherlands	39–26	DR Congo	Yeomju Gymnasium, Gwangju; Referees: Elsayed, Zidan (EGY)
July 21; 17:00	Kramer 7	(21–13)	Kabedi 8	Yeomju Gymnasium, Gwangju; Referees: Elsayed, Zidan (EGY)
July 21; 17:00	3× (yellow card) 4× (suspension)	Report	3× (yellow card) 6× (suspension)	Yeomju Gymnasium, Gwangju; Referees: Elsayed, Zidan (EGY)

July 21; 19:00	Croatia	30–13	China	Yeomju Gymnasium, Gwangju; Referees: Christiansen, Lythje (DEN)
July 21; 19:00	Janković 5	(13–6)	Wei 5	Yeomju Gymnasium, Gwangju; Referees: Christiansen, Lythje (DEN)
July 21; 19:00	3× (yellow card) 4× (suspension)	Report	2× (yellow card) 3× (suspension)	Yeomju Gymnasium, Gwangju; Referees: Christiansen, Lythje (DEN)

July 22; 14:10	South Korea	34–30	Netherlands	Yeomju Gymnasium, Gwangju; Referees: Coulibaly, Diabate (CIV)
July 22; 14:10	Ryu 12	(16–17)	van der Heijden 8	Yeomju Gymnasium, Gwangju; Referees: Coulibaly, Diabate (CIV)
July 22; 14:10	3× (yellow card) 4× (suspension)	Report	3× (yellow card) 5× (suspension)	Yeomju Gymnasium, Gwangju; Referees: Coulibaly, Diabate (CIV)

July 22; 16:10	DR Congo	16–36	Croatia	Yeomju Gymnasium, Gwangju; Referees: Carmen, Duta (ROU)
July 22; 16:10	Kapende 6	(8–15)	Vidović 8	Yeomju Gymnasium, Gwangju; Referees: Carmen, Duta (ROU)
July 22; 16:10	2× (yellow card) 5× (suspension)	Report	3× (yellow card)	Yeomju Gymnasium, Gwangju; Referees: Carmen, Duta (ROU)

July 22; 18:10	Argentina	32–24	China	Yeomju Gymnasium, Gwangju; Referees: Al Suwaidi, Bamutref (QAT)
July 22; 18:10	Salvado, Gambino 6	(18–13)	Sun 7	Yeomju Gymnasium, Gwangju; Referees: Al Suwaidi, Bamutref (QAT)
July 22; 18:10	2× (yellow card) 5× (suspension)	Report	3× (yellow card) 6× (suspension)	Yeomju Gymnasium, Gwangju; Referees: Al Suwaidi, Bamutref (QAT)

=== Group C ===
Team	Pld	W	D	L	GF	GA	GD	Pts
Hungary	5	4	1	0	180	86	+94	9
Brazil	5	3	2	0	161	107	+54	8
Spain	5	3	1	1	149	108	+41	7
Japan	5	2	0	3	132	108	+24	4
Thailand	5	1	0	4	97	169	−72	2
Australia	5	0	0	5	79	220	−141	0

July 17; 15:00	Hungary	25–25	Brazil	Hwa-Jung Tiger Hall, Seoul; Referees: Nachevski, Nikolov (MKD)
July 17; 15:00	Kovacsics 7	(10–13)	Souza 6	Hwa-Jung Tiger Hall, Seoul; Referees: Nachevski, Nikolov (MKD)
July 17; 15:00	3× (yellow card) 4× (suspension)	Report	3× (yellow card) 3× (suspension)	Hwa-Jung Tiger Hall, Seoul; Referees: Nachevski, Nikolov (MKD)

July 17; 17:00	Spain	43–12	Australia	Hwa-Jung Tiger Hall, Seoul; Referees: Al Mawlani, Al Mizil (BHR)
July 17; 17:00	López 8	(22–7)	Smiljanic 7	Hwa-Jung Tiger Hall, Seoul; Referees: Al Mawlani, Al Mizil (BHR)
July 17; 17:00	3× (yellow card) 1× (suspension)	Report	2× (yellow card) 1× (suspension)	Hwa-Jung Tiger Hall, Seoul; Referees: Al Mawlani, Al Mizil (BHR)

July 17; 19:00	Japan	37–14	Thailand	Hwa-Jung Tiger Hall, Seoul; Referees: Li, Wang (CHN)
July 17; 19:00	Sawa 6	(18–9)	Nongrueang, Boonnam 3	Hwa-Jung Tiger Hall, Seoul; Referees: Li, Wang (CHN)
July 17; 19:00	2× (yellow card) 1× (suspension)	Report	2× (yellow card) 3× (suspension)	Hwa-Jung Tiger Hall, Seoul; Referees: Li, Wang (CHN)

July 18; 15:00	Brazil	29–29	Spain	Hwa-Jung Tiger Hall, Seoul; Referees: Li, Wang (CHN)
July 18; 15:00	Souza 8	(12–13)	López 12	Hwa-Jung Tiger Hall, Seoul; Referees: Li, Wang (CHN)
July 18; 15:00	3× (yellow card) 2× (suspension)	Report	3× (yellow card) 6× (suspension)	Hwa-Jung Tiger Hall, Seoul; Referees: Li, Wang (CHN)

July 18; 17:00	Thailand	11–44	Hungary	Hwa-Jung Tiger Hall, Seoul; Referees: Rakytina, Tkatchuk (UKR)
July 18; 17:00	Manmai, Noowong 3	(3–19)	Szalai 9	Hwa-Jung Tiger Hall, Seoul; Referees: Rakytina, Tkatchuk (UKR)
July 18; 17:00	3× (yellow card) 3× (suspension)	Report	3× (yellow card) 4× (suspension)	Hwa-Jung Tiger Hall, Seoul; Referees: Rakytina, Tkatchuk (UKR)

July 18; 19:00	Australia	15–46	Japan	Hwa-Jung Tiger Hall, Seoul; Referees: Al Mawlani, Al Mizil (BHR)
July 18; 19:00	Brunsberg 7	(8–21)	Ikehara 11	Hwa-Jung Tiger Hall, Seoul; Referees: Al Mawlani, Al Mizil (BHR)
July 18; 19:00	3× (yellow card) 6× (suspension)	Report	2× (yellow card) 1× (suspension)	Hwa-Jung Tiger Hall, Seoul; Referees: Al Mawlani, Al Mizil (BHR)

July 19; 15:00	Hungary	51–14	Australia	Hwa-Jung Tiger Hall, Seoul; Referees: Li, Wang (CHN)
July 19; 15:00	Szalai 8	(24–5)	Brunsberg 8	Hwa-Jung Tiger Hall, Seoul; Referees: Li, Wang (CHN)
July 19; 15:00	3× (yellow card) 2× (suspension)	Report	3× (yellow card) 3× (suspension)	Hwa-Jung Tiger Hall, Seoul; Referees: Li, Wang (CHN)

July 19; 17:00	Spain	21–19	Japan	Hwa-Jung Tiger Hall, Seoul; Referees: Rakytina, Tkatchuk (UKR)
July 19; 17:00	Martínez 9	(13–9)	Ikehara 8	Hwa-Jung Tiger Hall, Seoul; Referees: Rakytina, Tkatchuk (UKR)
July 19; 17:00	3× (yellow card) 6× (suspension)	Report	2× (yellow card) 3× (suspension)	Hwa-Jung Tiger Hall, Seoul; Referees: Rakytina, Tkatchuk (UKR)

July 19; 19:00	Brazil	35–18	Thailand	Hwa-Jung Tiger Hall, Seoul; Referees: Nachevski, Nikolov (MKD)
July 19; 19:00	Marcondes 5	(15–5)	Kadnarin Kangrit 6	Hwa-Jung Tiger Hall, Seoul; Referees: Nachevski, Nikolov (MKD)
July 19; 19:00	3× (yellow card) 2× (suspension)	Report	3× (yellow card) 4× (suspension)	Hwa-Jung Tiger Hall, Seoul; Referees: Nachevski, Nikolov (MKD)

July 21; 15:00	Spain	31–21	Thailand	Hwa-Jung Tiger Hall, Seoul; Referees: Al Mawlani, Al Mizil (BHR)
July 21; 15:00	López 6	(15–12)	Boonnam 5	Hwa-Jung Tiger Hall, Seoul; Referees: Al Mawlani, Al Mizil (BHR)
July 21; 15:00	3× (yellow card) 1× (suspension)	Report	3× (yellow card)	Hwa-Jung Tiger Hall, Seoul; Referees: Al Mawlani, Al Mizil (BHR)

July 21; 17:00	Japan	11–33	Hungary	Hwa-Jung Tiger Hall, Seoul; Referees: Rakytina, Tkatchuk (UKR)
July 21; 17:00	Matsuo 3	(6–19)	Drávai 6	Hwa-Jung Tiger Hall, Seoul; Referees: Rakytina, Tkatchuk (UKR)
July 21; 17:00	2× (yellow card) 2× (suspension)	Report	3× (yellow card) 8× (suspension)	Hwa-Jung Tiger Hall, Seoul; Referees: Rakytina, Tkatchuk (UKR)

July 21; 19:00	Australia	16–47	Brazil	Hwa-Jung Tiger Hall, Seoul; Referees: Nachevski, Nikolov (MKD)
July 21; 19:00	Smiljanic 8	(7–23)	Vieira 6	Hwa-Jung Tiger Hall, Seoul; Referees: Nachevski, Nikolov (MKD)
July 21; 19:00	3× (yellow card) 3× (suspension)	Report	3× (yellow card) 1× (suspension)	Hwa-Jung Tiger Hall, Seoul; Referees: Nachevski, Nikolov (MKD)

July 22; 15:00	Thailand	33–22	Australia	Hwa-Jung Tiger Hall, Seoul; Referees: Li, Wang (CHN)
July 22; 15:00	Sila 12	(17–13)	Smiljanic 7	Hwa-Jung Tiger Hall, Seoul; Referees: Li, Wang (CHN)
July 22; 15:00	3× (yellow card) 3× (suspension)	Report	3× (yellow card) 2× (suspension)	Hwa-Jung Tiger Hall, Seoul; Referees: Li, Wang (CHN)

July 22; 17:00	Japan	19–25	Brazil	Hwa-Jung Tiger Hall, Seoul; Referees: Al Mawlani, Al Mizil (BHR)
July 22; 17:00	Hara 4	(9–8)	Vieira 8	Hwa-Jung Tiger Hall, Seoul; Referees: Al Mawlani, Al Mizil (BHR)
July 22; 17:00	3× (yellow card) 2× (suspension)	Report	3× (yellow card) 2× (suspension)	Hwa-Jung Tiger Hall, Seoul; Referees: Al Mawlani, Al Mizil (BHR)

July 22; 19:00	Hungary	27–25	Spain	Hwa-Jung Tiger Hall, Seoul; Referees: Nachevski, Nikolov (MKD)
July 22; 19:00	Kovacsics 9	(16–11)	López, Escribano, Chávez 5	Hwa-Jung Tiger Hall, Seoul; Referees: Nachevski, Nikolov (MKD)
July 22; 19:00	3× (yellow card) 9× (suspension) 1× (red card)	Report	3× (yellow card) 6× (suspension)	Hwa-Jung Tiger Hall, Seoul; Referees: Nachevski, Nikolov (MKD)

=== Group D ===
Team	Pld	W	D	L	GF	GA	GD	Pts
Montenegro	5	5	0	0	156	104	+52	10
Russia	5	4	0	1	174	96	+78	8
Sweden	5	3	0	2	151	100	+51	6
Angola	5	2	0	3	136	124	+12	4
Mexico	5	1	0	4	93	150	−57	2
Hong Kong	5	0	0	5	55	191	−136	0

July 17; 15:00	Russia	24–28	Montenegro	Dankook University, Cheonan; Attendance: 3000; Referees: Badura, Ondogrecula (SVK)
July 17; 15:00	Sen 5	(11–14)	Knežević 9	Dankook University, Cheonan; Attendance: 3000; Referees: Badura, Ondogrecula (SVK)
July 17; 15:00	2× (yellow card) 5× (suspension)	Report	3× (yellow card) 8× (suspension) 1× (red card)	Dankook University, Cheonan; Attendance: 3000; Referees: Badura, Ondogrecula (SVK)

July 17; 17:00	Sweden	42–7	Hong Kong	Dankook University, Cheonan; Attendance: 500; Referees: Kupa, Mobati (COD)
July 17; 17:00	Hagman 7	(18–3)	Cheung, Mak 2	Dankook University, Cheonan; Attendance: 500; Referees: Kupa, Mobati (COD)
July 17; 17:00	3× (yellow card) 4× (suspension)	Report	1× (yellow card) 2× (suspension)	Dankook University, Cheonan; Attendance: 500; Referees: Kupa, Mobati (COD)

July 17; 19:00	Angola	30–19	Mexico	Dankook University, Cheonan; Attendance: 600; Referees: Kim, Kim (KOR)
July 17; 19:00	Carlos, Cazanga 6	(15–9)	Rivera 5	Dankook University, Cheonan; Attendance: 600; Referees: Kim, Kim (KOR)
July 17; 19:00	3× (yellow card) 5× (suspension)	Report	3× (yellow card) 4× (suspension)	Dankook University, Cheonan; Attendance: 600; Referees: Kim, Kim (KOR)

July 18; 15:00	Montenegro	23–20	Sweden	Dankook University, Cheonan; Attendance: 800; Referees: Lenci, Grillo (ARG)
July 18; 15:00	Mehmedovic, Knežević 5	(12–10)	Hagman, Fogelström 4	Dankook University, Cheonan; Attendance: 800; Referees: Lenci, Grillo (ARG)
July 18; 15:00	3× (yellow card) 5× (suspension)	Report	3× (yellow card) 3× (suspension)	Dankook University, Cheonan; Attendance: 800; Referees: Lenci, Grillo (ARG)

July 18; 17:00	Mexico	18–37	Russia	Dankook University, Cheonan; Attendance: 400; Referees: Kupa, Mobati (COD)
July 18; 17:00	Iglesias 4	(7–16)	Chernova, Makeeva 5	Dankook University, Cheonan; Attendance: 400; Referees: Kupa, Mobati (COD)
July 18; 17:00	3× (yellow card) 6× (suspension)	Report	2× (yellow card) 5× (suspension)	Dankook University, Cheonan; Attendance: 400; Referees: Kupa, Mobati (COD)

July 18; 19:00	Hong Kong	10–36	Angola	Dankook University, Cheonan; Attendance: 400; Referees: Badura, Ondogrecula (SVK)
July 18; 19:00	Leung 5	(4–18)	Cazanga 9	Dankook University, Cheonan; Attendance: 400; Referees: Badura, Ondogrecula (SVK)
July 18; 19:00	2× (yellow card) 2× (suspension)	Report	1× (yellow card) 1× (suspension)	Dankook University, Cheonan; Attendance: 400; Referees: Badura, Ondogrecula (SVK)

July 19; 15:00	Russia	49–7	Hong Kong	Dankook University, Cheonan; Attendance: 400; Referees: Lenci, Grillo (ARG)
July 19; 15:00	Kudryashova 9	(27–2)	Wong, Leung 2	Dankook University, Cheonan; Attendance: 400; Referees: Lenci, Grillo (ARG)
July 19; 15:00	3× (yellow card) 1× (suspension)	Report	3× (yellow card) 1× (suspension)	Dankook University, Cheonan; Attendance: 400; Referees: Lenci, Grillo (ARG)

July 19; 17:00	Sweden	27–23	Angola	Dankook University, Cheonan; Attendance: 400; Referees: Badura, Ondogrecula (SVK)
July 19; 17:00	Hagman 11	(14–7)	Carlos 12	Dankook University, Cheonan; Attendance: 400; Referees: Badura, Ondogrecula (SVK)
July 19; 17:00	3× (yellow card) 3× (suspension)	Report	2× (yellow card) 7× (suspension)	Dankook University, Cheonan; Attendance: 400; Referees: Badura, Ondogrecula (SVK)

July 19; 19:00	Montenegro	29–17	Mexico	Dankook University, Cheonan; Attendance: 250; Referees: Kim, Kim (KOR)
July 19; 19:00	Premovic 6	(15–8)	Salinas 5	Dankook University, Cheonan; Attendance: 250; Referees: Kim, Kim (KOR)
July 19; 19:00	1× (yellow card) 2× (suspension)	Report	3× (yellow card) 4× (suspension)	Dankook University, Cheonan; Attendance: 250; Referees: Kim, Kim (KOR)

July 21; 15:00	Sweden	34–16	Mexico	Dankook University, Cheonan; Attendance: 300; Referees: Kupa, Mobati (COD)
July 21; 15:00	Hagman 8	(15–7)	Salinas, Quezada 3	Dankook University, Cheonan; Attendance: 300; Referees: Kupa, Mobati (COD)
July 21; 15:00	3× (yellow card) 4× (suspension)	Report	3× (yellow card) 4× (suspension)	Dankook University, Cheonan; Attendance: 300; Referees: Kupa, Mobati (COD)

July 21; 17:00	Angola	15–33	Russia	Dankook University, Cheonan; Attendance: 300; Referees: Kim, Kim (KOR)
July 21; 17:00	Guialo 6	(6–21)	Nikitina 6	Dankook University, Cheonan; Attendance: 300; Referees: Kim, Kim (KOR)
July 21; 17:00	2× (yellow card) 8× (suspension)	Report	2× (yellow card) 5× (suspension)	Dankook University, Cheonan; Attendance: 300; Referees: Kim, Kim (KOR)

July 21; 19:00	Hong Kong	11–41	Montenegro	Dankook University, Cheonan; Attendance: 300; Referees: Lenci, Grillo (ARG)
July 21; 19:00	Leung 4	(3–22)	Despotovic 7	Dankook University, Cheonan; Attendance: 300; Referees: Lenci, Grillo (ARG)
July 21; 19:00	3× (yellow card) 5× (suspension)	Report	3× (yellow card) 3× (suspension)	Dankook University, Cheonan; Attendance: 300; Referees: Lenci, Grillo (ARG)

July 22; 15:00	Mexico	23–20	Hong Kong	Dankook University, Cheonan; Attendance: 200; Referees: Kim, Kim (KOR)
July 22; 15:00	Salinas 6	(8–7)	Leung 8	Dankook University, Cheonan; Attendance: 200; Referees: Kim, Kim (KOR)
July 22; 15:00	1× (yellow card) 2× (suspension)	Report	3× (yellow card) 4× (suspension)	Dankook University, Cheonan; Attendance: 200; Referees: Kim, Kim (KOR)

July 22; 17:00	Angola	32–35	Montenegro	Dankook University, Cheonan; Attendance: 200; Referees: Lenci, Grillo (ARG)
July 22; 17:00	Tavares 9	(14–18)	Knežević 12	Dankook University, Cheonan; Attendance: 200; Referees: Lenci, Grillo (ARG)
July 22; 17:00	3× (yellow card) 5× (suspension) 1× (red card)	Report	3× (yellow card) 8× (suspension)	Dankook University, Cheonan; Attendance: 200; Referees: Lenci, Grillo (ARG)

July 22; 19:00	Russia	31–28	Sweden	Dankook University, Cheonan; Attendance: 300; Referees: Badura, Ondogrecula (SVK)
July 22; 19:00	Nikitina 8	(15–13)	Hagman 9	Dankook University, Cheonan; Attendance: 300; Referees: Badura, Ondogrecula (SVK)
July 22; 19:00	3× (yellow card) 5× (suspension)	Report	3× (yellow card) 3× (suspension)	Dankook University, Cheonan; Attendance: 300; Referees: Badura, Ondogrecula (SVK)

== Main round ==
=== Group I ===
Team	Pld	W	D	L	GF	GA	GD	Pts
South Korea	5	5	0	0	161	140	+21	10
Norway	5	4	0	1	159	129	+30	8
Netherlands	5	2	1	2	144	156	−12	5
Germany	5	2	0	3	129	142	−13	4
Serbia	5	1	0	4	149	157	−8	2
Croatia	5	0	1	4	134	152	−18	1

July 24; 15:00	Serbia	30–38	South Korea	Hwa-Jung Tiger Hall, Seoul; Attendance: 1,500; Referees: Volodkov, Zotin (RUS)
July 24; 15:00	Živković 9	(10–19)	Jo 9	Hwa-Jung Tiger Hall, Seoul; Attendance: 1,500; Referees: Volodkov, Zotin (RUS)
July 24; 15:00	3× (yellow card) 3× (suspension)	Report	3× (yellow card) 4× (suspension)	Hwa-Jung Tiger Hall, Seoul; Attendance: 1,500; Referees: Volodkov, Zotin (RUS)

July 24; 17:00	Germany	25–22	Croatia	Hwa-Jung Tiger Hall, Seoul; Attendance: 1,000; Referees: Rakytina, Tkatchuk (UKR)
July 24; 17:00	Muller 6	(12–8)	Milić 9	Hwa-Jung Tiger Hall, Seoul; Attendance: 1,000; Referees: Rakytina, Tkatchuk (UKR)
July 24; 17:00	3× (yellow card) 3× (suspension)	Report	3× (yellow card) 3× (suspension)	Hwa-Jung Tiger Hall, Seoul; Attendance: 1,000; Referees: Rakytina, Tkatchuk (UKR)

July 24; 19:00	Norway	35–21	Netherlands	Hwa-Jung Tiger Hall, Seoul; Attendance: 1,000; Referees: Nachevski, Nikolov (MKD)
July 24; 19:00	Oftedal 7	(16–11)	van der Heijden 7	Hwa-Jung Tiger Hall, Seoul; Attendance: 1,000; Referees: Nachevski, Nikolov (MKD)
July 24; 19:00	3× (yellow card) 7× (suspension)	Report	3× (yellow card) 7× (suspension)	Hwa-Jung Tiger Hall, Seoul; Attendance: 1,000; Referees: Nachevski, Nikolov (MKD)

July 25; 15:00	South Korea	24–22	Germany	Hwa-Jung Tiger Hall, Seoul; Attendance: 1,200; Referees: Herczeg, Sudi (HUN)
July 25; 15:00	Lee 9	(11–12)	Naidzinavicius, Wenzl 5	Hwa-Jung Tiger Hall, Seoul; Attendance: 1,200; Referees: Herczeg, Sudi (HUN)
July 25; 15:00	3× (yellow card) 3× (suspension)	Report	3× (yellow card) 2× (suspension)	Hwa-Jung Tiger Hall, Seoul; Attendance: 1,200; Referees: Herczeg, Sudi (HUN)

July 25; 17:00	Croatia	30–36	Norway	Hwa-Jung Tiger Hall, Seoul; Attendance: 500; Referees: Li, Wang (CHN)
July 25; 17:00	Milić 7	(14–22)	Kristiansen 8	Hwa-Jung Tiger Hall, Seoul; Attendance: 500; Referees: Li, Wang (CHN)
July 25; 17:00	3× (yellow card) 3× (suspension)	Report	2× (yellow card) 1× (suspension)	Hwa-Jung Tiger Hall, Seoul; Attendance: 500; Referees: Li, Wang (CHN)

July 25; 19:00	Netherlands	36–34	Serbia	Hwa-Jung Tiger Hall, Seoul; Attendance: 200; Referees: Rakytina, Tkatchuk (UKR)
July 25; 19:00	van der Heijden 10	(15–23)	Cvijić, Trifunović 8	Hwa-Jung Tiger Hall, Seoul; Attendance: 200; Referees: Rakytina, Tkatchuk (UKR)
July 25; 19:00	3× (yellow card) 5× (suspension)	Report	2× (yellow card) 7× (suspension)	Hwa-Jung Tiger Hall, Seoul; Attendance: 200; Referees: Rakytina, Tkatchuk (UKR)

July 27; 15:00	Norway	26–30	South Korea	Hwa-Jung Tiger Hall, Seoul; Attendance: 1,500; Referees: Volodkov, Zotin (RUS)
July 27; 15:00	Molid, Yttereng 5	(12–15)	Lee 8	Hwa-Jung Tiger Hall, Seoul; Attendance: 1,500; Referees: Volodkov, Zotin (RUS)
July 27; 15:00	3× (yellow card) 2× (suspension)	Report	3× (yellow card) 2× (suspension)	Hwa-Jung Tiger Hall, Seoul; Attendance: 1,500; Referees: Volodkov, Zotin (RUS)

July 27; 17:00	Serbia	33–27	Croatia	Hwa-Jung Tiger Hall, Seoul; Attendance: 1,000; Referees: Herczeg, Sudi (HUN)
July 27; 17:00	Živković 12	(16–12)	Poljak 7	Hwa-Jung Tiger Hall, Seoul; Attendance: 1,000; Referees: Herczeg, Sudi (HUN)
July 27; 17:00	2× (yellow card) 2× (suspension)	Report	3× (yellow card) 4× (suspension)	Hwa-Jung Tiger Hall, Seoul; Attendance: 1,000; Referees: Herczeg, Sudi (HUN)

July 27; 19:00	Germany	30–34	Netherlands	Hwa-Jung Tiger Hall, Seoul; Attendance: 200; Referees: Nachevski, Nikolov (MKD)
July 27; 19:00	Zapf 8	(15–15)	van der Heijden 10	Hwa-Jung Tiger Hall, Seoul; Attendance: 200; Referees: Nachevski, Nikolov (MKD)
July 27; 19:00	3× (yellow card) 5× (suspension)	Report	3× (yellow card) 8× (suspension)	Hwa-Jung Tiger Hall, Seoul; Attendance: 200; Referees: Nachevski, Nikolov (MKD)

=== Group II ===
Team	Pld	W	D	L	GF	GA	GD	Pts
Montenegro	5	4	0	1	117	106	+11	8 (Note: Tie-breaker: MNE 28–24 RUS)
Russia	5	4	0	1	149	138	+11	8
Hungary	5	2	1	2	119	121	−2	5
Sweden	5	2	0	3	128	119	+9	4
Spain	5	1	1	3	111	130	−19	3
Brazil	5	0	2	3	139	149	−10	2

Notes:

July 24; 15:00	Brazil	26–33	Sweden	Yeomju Gymnasium, Gwangju; Attendance: 500; Referees: Al Marzouqi, Al Nuaimi (UAE)
July 24; 15:00	Souza 8	(15–17)	Hagman 10	Yeomju Gymnasium, Gwangju; Attendance: 500; Referees: Al Marzouqi, Al Nuaimi (UAE)
July 24; 15:00	3× (yellow card) 1× (suspension)	Report	3× (yellow card) 1× (suspension)	Yeomju Gymnasium, Gwangju; Attendance: 500; Referees: Al Marzouqi, Al Nuaimi (UAE)

July 24; 17:00	Spain	24–23	Montenegro	Yeomju Gymnasium, Gwangju; Referees: Florescu, Duta (ROU)
July 24; 17:00	Martinez 9	(15–12)	Mehmedovic, Knežević 5	Yeomju Gymnasium, Gwangju; Referees: Florescu, Duta (ROU)
July 24; 17:00	2× (yellow card) 3× (suspension)	Report	3× (yellow card) 3× (suspension)	Yeomju Gymnasium, Gwangju; Referees: Florescu, Duta (ROU)

July 24; 19:00	Hungary	23–26	Russia	Yeomju Gymnasium, Gwangju; Referees: Christiansen, Lythje (DEN)
July 24; 19:00	Kovacsics 8	(14–13)	Khmyrova 11	Yeomju Gymnasium, Gwangju; Referees: Christiansen, Lythje (DEN)
July 24; 19:00	3× (yellow card) 8× (suspension)	Report	3× (yellow card) 6× (suspension)	Yeomju Gymnasium, Gwangju; Referees: Christiansen, Lythje (DEN)

July 25; 15:00	Montenegro	23–22	Brazil	Yeomju Gymnasium, Gwangju; Referees: Badura, Ondogrecula (SVK)
July 25; 15:00	Mehmedovic 8	(11–11)	Souza, Rocatelli 4	Yeomju Gymnasium, Gwangju; Referees: Badura, Ondogrecula (SVK)
July 25; 15:00	3× (yellow card) 3× (suspension)	Report	3× (yellow card) 1× (suspension)	Yeomju Gymnasium, Gwangju; Referees: Badura, Ondogrecula (SVK)

July 25; 17:00	Sweden	25–28	Hungary	Yeomju Gymnasium, Gwangju; Referees: Coulibaly, Diabate (CIV)
July 25; 17:00	Hagman 6	(14–16)	Kovacsics 6	Yeomju Gymnasium, Gwangju; Referees: Coulibaly, Diabate (CIV)
July 25; 17:00	3× (yellow card) 4× (suspension)	Report	2× (yellow card) 1× (suspension)	Yeomju Gymnasium, Gwangju; Referees: Coulibaly, Diabate (CIV)

July 25; 19:00	Russia	29–22	Spain	Yeomju Gymnasium, Gwangju; Attendance: 300; Referees: Grillo, Lenci (ARG)
July 25; 19:00	Kudryashova 5	(18–10)	Martinez 7	Yeomju Gymnasium, Gwangju; Attendance: 300; Referees: Grillo, Lenci (ARG)
July 25; 19:00	3× (yellow card) 2× (suspension)	Report	3× (yellow card) 5× (suspension)	Yeomju Gymnasium, Gwangju; Attendance: 300; Referees: Grillo, Lenci (ARG)

July 27; 15:00	Spain	11–22	Sweden	Yeomju Gymnasium, Gwangju; Attendance: 200; Referees: Badura, Ondogrecula (SVK)
July 27; 15:00	Lopez 5	(6–8)	Hagman 11	Yeomju Gymnasium, Gwangju; Attendance: 200; Referees: Badura, Ondogrecula (SVK)
July 27; 15:00	3× (yellow card) 3× (suspension)	Report	3× (yellow card) 2× (suspension)	Yeomju Gymnasium, Gwangju; Attendance: 200; Referees: Badura, Ondogrecula (SVK)

July 27; 17:00	Brazil	37–39	Russia	Yeomju Gymnasium, Gwangju; Attendance: 200; Referees: Coulibaly, Diabate (CIV)
July 27; 17:00	Marcondes 9	(17–20)	Khmyrova, Nikitina 8	Yeomju Gymnasium, Gwangju; Attendance: 200; Referees: Coulibaly, Diabate (CIV)
July 27; 17:00	2× (yellow card) 4× (suspension)	Report	3× (yellow card) 5× (suspension)	Yeomju Gymnasium, Gwangju; Attendance: 200; Referees: Coulibaly, Diabate (CIV)

July 27; 19:00	Hungary	16–20	Montenegro	Yeomju Gymnasium, Gwangju; Attendance: 200; Referees: Al Marzouqi, Al Nuaimi (UAE)
July 27; 19:00	Drávai 4	(8–9)	Knežević 10	Yeomju Gymnasium, Gwangju; Attendance: 200; Referees: Al Marzouqi, Al Nuaimi (UAE)
July 27; 19:00	1× (yellow card) 2× (suspension)	Report	3× (yellow card) 1× (suspension)	Yeomju Gymnasium, Gwangju; Attendance: 200; Referees: Al Marzouqi, Al Nuaimi (UAE)

== President's Cup ==
=== 21st–24th ===
Semifinal 21st–24th
July 24 – Cheonan
Greenland	27
DR Congo	24
July 24 – Bicgoeul
Australia	27
Hong Kong	19

21st place
July 26 – Bicgoeul
Greenland	36
Australia	15
23rd place
July 26 – Cheonan
DR Congo	39
Hong Kong	24

July 24; 19:00	Greenland	27–24	DR Congo	Bicgoeul Gym, Gwangju; Referees: Al Suwaidi, Bamutref (QAT)
July 24; 19:00	Tremel 9	(14–12)	Monga 6	Bicgoeul Gym, Gwangju; Referees: Al Suwaidi, Bamutref (QAT)
July 24; 19:00	3× (yellow card) 1× (suspension)	Report	3× (yellow card) 2× (suspension)	Bicgoeul Gym, Gwangju; Referees: Al Suwaidi, Bamutref (QAT)

July 24; 19:00	Australia	27–19	Hong Kong	Dankook University, Cheonan; Attendance: 50; Referees: Al Mizil, Al Mawlani (BHR)
July 24; 19:00	Brunsberg 10	(10–8)	Leung 5	Dankook University, Cheonan; Attendance: 50; Referees: Al Mizil, Al Mawlani (BHR)
July 24; 19:00	3× (yellow card) 4× (suspension)	Report	2× (yellow card) 1× (suspension)	Dankook University, Cheonan; Attendance: 50; Referees: Al Mizil, Al Mawlani (BHR)

==== 23rd/24th ====
July 26; 11:00	DR Congo	39–24	Hong Kong	Dankook University, Cheonan; Attendance: 50; Referees: Al Mizil, Al Mawlani (BHR)
July 26; 11:00	Laying 15	(25–8)	Leung 9	Dankook University, Cheonan; Attendance: 50; Referees: Al Mizil, Al Mawlani (BHR)
July 26; 11:00	3× (yellow card) 4× (suspension)	Report	2× (yellow card) 3× (suspension)	Dankook University, Cheonan; Attendance: 50; Referees: Al Mizil, Al Mawlani (BHR)

==== 21st/22nd ====
July 26; 14:30	Greenland	36–15	Australia	Bicgoeul Gym, Gwangju; Attendance: 200; Referees: Lythje, Christiansen (DEN)
July 26; 14:30	Holm 8	(19–7)	Brunsberg 8	Bicgoeul Gym, Gwangju; Attendance: 200; Referees: Lythje, Christiansen (DEN)
July 26; 14:30	2× (yellow card) 1× (suspension)	Report	2× (yellow card) 2× (suspension)	Bicgoeul Gym, Gwangju; Attendance: 200; Referees: Lythje, Christiansen (DEN)

=== 17th–20th ===
Semifinal 17th–20th
July 24 – Bicgoeul
Tunisia	26
China	29
July 24 – Cheonan
Thailand	19
Mexico	22

17th place
July 26 – Bicgoeul
China	28
Mexico	22
19th place
July 26 – Cheonan
Tunisia	37
Thailand	21

July 24; 16:45	Tunisia	26–29	China	Bicgoeul Gym, Gwangju; Referees: Grillo, Lenci (ARG)
July 24; 16:45	El Ghaoui, Elhem Gherissi 7	(11–15)	Tao 7	Bicgoeul Gym, Gwangju; Referees: Grillo, Lenci (ARG)
July 24; 16:45	3× (yellow card) 4× (suspension)	Report	3× (yellow card) 7× (suspension) 2× (red card)	Bicgoeul Gym, Gwangju; Referees: Grillo, Lenci (ARG)

July 24; 16:45	Thailand	19–22	Mexico	Dankook University, Cheonan; Attendance: 50; Referees: Kupa, Mobati (COD)
July 24; 16:45	Boonnam 5	(10–15)	Salinas 8	Dankook University, Cheonan; Attendance: 50; Referees: Kupa, Mobati (COD)
July 24; 16:45	3× (yellow card) 2× (suspension)	Report	3× (yellow card) 6× (suspension)	Dankook University, Cheonan; Attendance: 50; Referees: Kupa, Mobati (COD)

==== 19th/20th ====
July 26; 16:45	Tunisia	37–21	Thailand	Dankook University, Cheonan; Attendance: 50; Referees: Kim, Kim (KOR)
July 26; 16:45	Gherissi 11	(20–12)	Sila 7	Dankook University, Cheonan; Attendance: 50; Referees: Kim, Kim (KOR)
July 26; 16:45	1× (yellow card) 5× (suspension)	Report	3× (yellow card) 4× (suspension)	Dankook University, Cheonan; Attendance: 50; Referees: Kim, Kim (KOR)

==== 17th/18th ====
July 26; 16:45	China	28–22	Mexico	Bicgoeul Gym, Gwangju; Attendance: 500; Referees: Florescu, Duta (ROU)
July 26; 16:45	Li 7	(11–13)	Salinas 8	Bicgoeul Gym, Gwangju; Attendance: 500; Referees: Florescu, Duta (ROU)
July 26; 16:45	2× (yellow card) 6× (suspension)	Report	3× (yellow card) 4× (suspension)	Bicgoeul Gym, Gwangju; Attendance: 500; Referees: Florescu, Duta (ROU)

=== 13th–16th ===
Semifinal 13th–16th
July 24 – Bicgoeul
France	34
Argentina	23
July 24 – Cheonan
Japan	26
Angola	32

13th place
July 26 – Bicgoeul
France	30
Angola	28
15th place
July 26 – Cheonan
Argentina (1ET)	28
Japan	27

July 24; 14:30	France	34–23	Argentina	Bicgoeul Gym, Gwangju; Referees: Badura, Ondogrecula (SVK)
July 24; 14:30	Manach 7	(19–13)	Salvado, Mendoza 6	Bicgoeul Gym, Gwangju; Referees: Badura, Ondogrecula (SVK)
July 24; 14:30	3× (yellow card) 3× (suspension)	Report	3× (yellow card) 2× (suspension)	Bicgoeul Gym, Gwangju; Referees: Badura, Ondogrecula (SVK)

July 24; 14:00	Japan	26–32	Angola	Dankook University, Cheonan; Referees: Elsayed, Zidan (EGY)
July 24; 14:00	Hara, Matsumura 6	(14–15)	Cazanga 11	Dankook University, Cheonan; Referees: Elsayed, Zidan (EGY)
July 24; 14:00	3× (yellow card) 2× (suspension)	Report	3× (yellow card) 3× (suspension)	Dankook University, Cheonan; Referees: Elsayed, Zidan (EGY)

==== 15th/16th ====
July 26; 19:00	Argentina	28–27 (ET)	Japan	Dankook University, Cheonan; Attendance: 50; Referees: Elsayed, Zidan (EGY)
July 26; 19:00	Mendoza, Crivelli 9	(12–11, 20–20)	Inui 6	Dankook University, Cheonan; Attendance: 50; Referees: Elsayed, Zidan (EGY)
July 26; 19:00	3× (yellow card) 4× (suspension)	Report	3× (yellow card) 4× (suspension)	Dankook University, Cheonan; Attendance: 50; Referees: Elsayed, Zidan (EGY)

==== 13th/14th ====
July 26; 19:00	France	30–28	Angola	Bicgoeul Gym, Gwangju; Referees: Al Suwaidi, Bamutref (QAT)
July 26; 19:00	Prudhomme 6	(16–15)	Santos, Carlos, Cazanga 5	Bicgoeul Gym, Gwangju; Referees: Al Suwaidi, Bamutref (QAT)
July 26; 19:00	2× (yellow card) 3× (suspension) 1× (red card)	Report	2× (yellow card) 3× (suspension)	Bicgoeul Gym, Gwangju; Referees: Al Suwaidi, Bamutref (QAT)

== Placement matches ==
=== 11th/12th ===
July 29; 12:15	Croatia	35–26	Brazil	Yeomju Gymnasium, Gwangju; Attendance: 100; Referees: Al Suwaidi, Bamutref (QAT)
July 29; 12:15	Ježić 9	(13–8)	Souza 8	Yeomju Gymnasium, Gwangju; Attendance: 100; Referees: Al Suwaidi, Bamutref (QAT)
July 29; 12:15	3× (yellow card) 3× (suspension)	Report	3× (yellow card) 1× (suspension)	Yeomju Gymnasium, Gwangju; Attendance: 100; Referees: Al Suwaidi, Bamutref (QAT)

=== 9th/10th ===
July 29; 14:30	Serbia	32–26	Spain	Yeomju Gymnasium, Gwangju; Attendance: 400; Referees: Grillo, Lenci (ARG)
July 29; 14:30	Nikolic 7	(17–13)	Lopez 8	Yeomju Gymnasium, Gwangju; Attendance: 400; Referees: Grillo, Lenci (ARG)
July 29; 14:30	3× (yellow card) 1× (suspension)	Report	3× (yellow card) 1× (suspension)	Yeomju Gymnasium, Gwangju; Attendance: 400; Referees: Grillo, Lenci (ARG)

=== 7th/8th ===
July 29; 16:45	Germany	31–30	Sweden	Yeomju Gymnasium, Gwangju; Attendance: 300; Referees: Carmen, Duta (ROU)
July 29; 16:45	Zapf 10	(16–16)	Hagman 9	Yeomju Gymnasium, Gwangju; Attendance: 300; Referees: Carmen, Duta (ROU)
July 29; 16:45	3× (yellow card) 3× (suspension)	Report	2× (yellow card)	Yeomju Gymnasium, Gwangju; Attendance: 300; Referees: Carmen, Duta (ROU)

=== 5th/6th ===
July 29; 19:00	Netherlands	28–29	Hungary	Yeomju Gymnasium, Gwangju; Attendance: 400; Referees: Badura, Ondogrecula (SVK)
July 29; 19:00	Kramer, Bont 7	(17–13)	Hornyák 7	Yeomju Gymnasium, Gwangju; Attendance: 400; Referees: Badura, Ondogrecula (SVK)
July 29; 19:00	3× (yellow card) 4× (suspension)	Report	3× (yellow card) 9× (suspension)	Yeomju Gymnasium, Gwangju; Attendance: 400; Referees: Badura, Ondogrecula (SVK)

== Final round ==
Semifinal
July 29 – Seoul
South Korea	26
Russia	30
July 29 – Seoul
Montenegro	16
Norway	26

Final
July 31 – Seoul
Russia	21
Norway	30
Third place
July 31 – Seoul
South Korea	23
Montenegro	24

=== Semifinals ===
July 29; 14:00	South Korea	26–30	Russia	Hwa-Jung Tiger Hall, Seoul; Attendance: 2,500; Referees: Coulibaly, Diabate (CIV)
July 29; 14:00	Lee, Ryu 8	(14–17)	Khmyrova 10	Hwa-Jung Tiger Hall, Seoul; Attendance: 2,500; Referees: Coulibaly, Diabate (CIV)
July 29; 14:00	3× (yellow card) 2× (suspension)	Report	1× (yellow card) 6× (suspension)	Hwa-Jung Tiger Hall, Seoul; Attendance: 2,500; Referees: Coulibaly, Diabate (CIV)

July 29; 16:30	Montenegro	16–26	Norway	Hwa-Jung Tiger Hall, Seoul; Attendance: 450; Referees: Al Marzouqi, Al Nuaimi (UAE)
July 29; 16:30	Knežević 5	(10–11)	Mørk 11	Hwa-Jung Tiger Hall, Seoul; Attendance: 450; Referees: Al Marzouqi, Al Nuaimi (UAE)
July 29; 16:30	3× (yellow card) 4× (suspension)	Report	3× (yellow card) 2× (suspension)	Hwa-Jung Tiger Hall, Seoul; Attendance: 450; Referees: Al Marzouqi, Al Nuaimi (UAE)

=== Bronze medal match ===
July 31; 14:00	South Korea	23–24	Montenegro	Hwa-Jung Tiger Hall, Seoul; Attendance: 3,000; Referees: Lythje, Christiansen (DEN)
July 31; 14:00	Ryu 10	(10–12)	Knežević 9	Hwa-Jung Tiger Hall, Seoul; Attendance: 3,000; Referees: Lythje, Christiansen (DEN)
July 31; 14:00	3× (yellow card) 2× (suspension)	Report	3× (yellow card) 3× (suspension)	Hwa-Jung Tiger Hall, Seoul; Attendance: 3,000; Referees: Lythje, Christiansen (DEN)

=== Gold medal match ===
July 31; 16:30	Russia	21–30	Norway	Hwa-Jung Tiger Hall, Seoul; Attendance: 2,500; Referees: Nachevski, Nikolov (MKD)
July 31; 16:30	Nikitina 5	(11–14)	Oftedal 7	Hwa-Jung Tiger Hall, Seoul; Attendance: 2,500; Referees: Nachevski, Nikolov (MKD)
July 31; 16:30	3× (yellow card) 4× (suspension)	Report	3× (yellow card) 1× (suspension)	Hwa-Jung Tiger Hall, Seoul; Attendance: 2,500; Referees: Nachevski, Nikolov (MKD)

== Ranking and statistics ==
=== Final ranking ===
Rank	Team
Gold medal	Norway
Silver medal	Russia
Bronze medal	Montenegro
4	South Korea
5	Hungary
6	Netherlands
7	Germany
8	Sweden
9	Serbia
10	Spain
11	Croatia
12	Brazil
13	France
14	Angola
15	Argentina
16	Japan
17	China
18	Mexico
19	Tunisia
20	Thailand
21	Greenland
22	Australia
23	DR Congo
24	Hong Kong

2010 Junior Women's World Champions

Norway
First title

Team roster

Silje Solberg, Christine Homme, Veronica Kristiansen, Hanna Yttereng, Mai Marcussen, Stine Bredal Oftedal, Mari Molid, Maja Jakobsen, Sanna Solberg, Nora Mørk, Guro Rundbråten, Silje Katrine Svendsen, Ellen Marie Folkvord, Hilde Kamperud, Kristin Nørstebø, Susann Iren Hall.

=== All Star Team ===
- Goalkeeper: Marina Vukčević (MNE)
- Left wing: Sanna Solberg (NOR)
- Left back: Milena Knežević (MNE)
- Pivot: Ksenia Makeeva (RUS)
- Centre back: Stine Bredal Oftedal (NOR)
- Right back: Tatiana Khmyrova (RUS)
- Right wing: Kim Seon-hwa (KOR)

Chosen by team officials and IHF experts: IHF.info

=== Other awards ===
- Most Valuable Player: Lee Eun-bi (KOR)
- Top Goalscorer: 75 goals
  Nathalie Hagman (SWE)

=== Top goalkeepers ===
Rank	Name	Team	Saves	Shots	%
1	Jessica Oliveira	Brazil	127	325	39.1%
2	Marta Žderić	Croatia	122	314	38.9%
3	Nele Kurzke	Germany	93	285	32.6%
4	Marina Vukčević	Montenegro	85	220	38.6%
5	Guro Rundbråten	Norway	82	198	41.4%
6	Shuk Yee Wong	Hong Kong	80	301	26.6%
7	Marija Colic	Serbia	75	213	35.2%
8	Preeyanut Bureeruk	Thailand	73	266	27.4%
9	Elena Fomina	Russia	71	194	36.6%
9	Sori Park	South Korea	71	260	27.3%

Source: ihf.info

=== Top goalscorers ===
Rank	Name	Team	Goals	Shots	%
1	Nathalie Hagman	Sweden	75	96	78.1%
2	Laura van den Heijden	Netherlands	72	109	66.1%
3	Ryu Eun-hee	South Korea	63	109	57.8%
4	Milena Knežević	Montenegro	62	124	50.0%
5	Jelena Živković	Serbia	59	103	57.3%
6	Lee Eun-bi	South Korea	58	87	66.7%
7	Tatiana Khmyrova	Russia	55	80	68.8%
7	Luciana Mendoza	Argentina	55	87	63.2%
9	Marta Lopez	Spain	52	91	57.1%
10	Ana Martinez	Spain	49	92	53.3%

Source: ihf.info
