= 2009 World Women's Handball Championship squads =

The following is a list of squads for each nation competing at the 2009 World Women's Handball Championship in the People's Republic of China. The tournament began 5 December, and its final was held in Nanjing on 20 December.

Each nation had to submit an initial squad of 28 players, 12 of them became reserves when the final squad of 16 players was announced on 5 December.

Appearances, goals and ages as of 5 December 2009.

== Group A ==
=== Brazil ===
Head coach: Morten Soubak (DEN)

No.	Pos.	Name	Date of birth (age)	Height	App.	Goals	Club
1	GK	Darly de Paula	25 August 1982 (aged 27)	1.80 m	188	0	(France) Le Havre
2		Fabiana Diniz	13 May 1981 (aged 28)	1.83 m	93	137	(Spain) Mar Alicante
3		Jaqueline Anastácio	9 November 1987 (aged 22)	1.73 m	24	48	(Brazil) Metodista
4		Fernanda da Silva	25 September 1989 (aged 20)	1.73 m	24	48	(Brazil) Metodista
5		Scheyla Gris	29 April 1983 (aged 26)	1.86 m	31	22	(Brazil) A.D. Blu
6		Célie da Costa	17 April 1980 (aged 29)	1.74 m	41	108	(Brazil) Metodista
7		Rosária da Silva	15 May 1981 (aged 28)	1.68 m	0	0	(Brazil) Santo André
8		Flávia da Silva	27 May 1985 (aged 24)	1.76 m	15	25	(Spain) Elche Mustang
9		Ana Paula Rodrigues	18 August 1987 (aged 22)	1.72 m	39	98	(Spain) Elda Prestigio
10		Aline Rosas	28 June 1979 (aged 30)	1.59 m	125	246	(Brazil) A.D. Blu
11		Regiane Silva	31 January 1984 (aged 25)	1.80 m	22	34	(Brazil) Suzano
12	GK	Mayssa Pessoa	11 September 1984 (aged 25)	1.80 m	16	0	(France) Arvor 29
15		Silvia Helena Pinheiro	11 January 1981 (aged 28)	1.74 m	76	137	(Spain) CB Ademar León
16	GK	Barbara Arenhart	4 October 1986 (aged 23)	1.82 m	23	0	(Spain) BM Parc Sagunto
18		Eduarda Amorim	23 September 1986 (aged 23)	1.86 m	68	183	(Hungary) Györi Audi ETO KC
19		Adriana Lima	21 September 1983 (aged 26)	1.81 m	24	63	(Brazil) Santo André

=== Congo ===
Head coach: Celestin Mpoua (CGO)

- Diane Mireille Louoba
- Jumelle Nanette Okoko
- Diane Lekibi
- Herdia Eyala Delpoko
- Chantal Okomba
- Porcia Essopondo
- Lëontine Kibamba Nkembo
- Melh Ngaloyi Boyembe
- Ndona Bassarila
- Edrige Jocely Mavoungou
- Chentai Okoye Mbon
- Lucie Chantal Okanatha
- Aurelle Itoua Atsono
- Prisca Ngoli Madzou
- Loemba Averthy
- Sandrine Oyoukou

=== Denmark ===
The squad was announced on 19 November 2009. On 22 November 2009 Susanne Kastrup replaced Gitte Aaen in the squad. On 4 December 2009, Christina Krogshede replaced Lærke Møller in the squad due to a cruciate ligament injury.

Head coach: Jan Pytlick

No.	Pos.	Name	Date of birth (age)	Height	App.	Goals	Club
2	P	Mette Melgaard	30 June 1980 (aged 29)	1.70 m	29	50	(Denmark) FCK Håndbold
3	RW	Maibritt Kviesgaard	15 May 1986 (aged 23)	1.71 m	47	96	(Denmark) SK Århus
5	LW	Mie Augustesen	19 July 1988 (aged 21)	1.77 m	32	113	(Denmark) Randers HK
8	CB	Louise Mortensen	11 December 1979 (aged 29)	1.76 m	92	174	(Denmark) Aalborg DH
9	RB	Camilla Dalby	15 May 1988 (aged 21)	1.78 m	45	120	(Denmark) Randers HK
10	CB	Christina Krogshede	4 November 1981 (aged 28)	1.72 m	35	77	(Denmark) FCK Håndbold
11	P	Lene Lund Nielsen	8 June 1979 (aged 30)	1.84 m	106	169	(Denmark) Viborg HK
12	GK	Karin Mortensen	26 September 1977 (aged 32)	1.80 m	172	4	(Denmark) SK Århus
15	LB	Pernille Larsen	6 September 1984 (aged 25)	1.81 m	23	36	(Denmark) Odense GOG
16	GK	Christina Pedersen	15 December 1982 (aged 26)	1.80 m	51	1	(Denmark) FCK Håndbold
18	P	Kamilla Kristensen	2 September 1983 (aged 26)	1.83 m	64	121	(Denmark) Odense GOG
19	RB	Line Jørgensen	31 December 1989 (aged 19)	1.83 m	18	57	(Denmark) Odense GOG
21	CB	Kristina Kristiansen	13 July 1989 (aged 20)	1.62 m	20	62	(Denmark) Team Tvis Holstebro
22	LB	Trine Troelsen	2 May 1985 (aged 24)	1.72 m	65	133	(Denmark) SK Århus
23	LW	Susanne Kastrup	24 June 1983 (aged 26)	1.71 m	25	63	(Denmark) KIF Vejen
24	RW	Louise Pedersen	19 January 1979 (aged 30)	1.70 m	52	104	(Denmark) Odense GOG

=== France ===
Head coach: Olivier Krumbholz (FRA)

No.	Pos.	Name	Date of birth (age)	Height	App.	Goals	Club
1	GK	Linda Pradel	4 June 1983 (aged 26)	1.80 m	40	0	(France) Le Havre
2	P	Amélie Goudjo	19 April 1980 (aged 29)	1.73 m	30	47	(Spain) BM Bera Bera
3	RW	Blandine Dancette	14 February 1988 (aged 21)	1.69 m	5	7	(France) HBC Nîmes
5	RB	Camille Ayglon	21 May 1985 (aged 24)	1.80 m	67	136	(France) Metz Handball
7	CB	Allison Pineau	2 May 1989 (aged 20)	1.81 m	54	113	(France) Metz Handball
8	LB	Claudine Mendy	8 January 1990 (aged 19)	1.82 m	10	29	(France) Le Havre
9	LW	Paule Baudouin	25 October 1984 (aged 25)	1.72 m	99	249	(Denmark) Team Esbjerg
12	GK	Amandine Leynaud	2 May 1986 (aged 23)	1.78 m	63	0	(France) Metz Handball
15	P	Vanessa Jelic	24 November 1981 (aged 28)	1.77 m	3	0	(France) Toulouse Féminin Handball
16	GK	Cléopâtre Darleux	1 July 1989 (aged 20)	1.76 m	25	0	(France) Metz Handball
17	LW	Siraba Dembélé	26 July 1996 (aged 13)	1.72 m	64	151	(France) Toulon Saint-Cyr Var Handball
18	RW	Audrey Deroin	6 September 1989 (aged 20)	1.74 m	21	25	(France) Mios-Biganos
20	LW	Raphaëlle Tervel	21 April 1979 (aged 30)	1.78 m	188	318	(Spain) BM Bera Bera
21	LB	Marion Limal	12 January 1987 (aged 22)	1.84 m	26	43	(Austria) Hypo Niederösterreich
22	RW	Katty Piejos	21 August 1981 (aged 28)	1.63 m	45	74	(France) Metz Handball
24	LB	Mariama Signaté	22 July 1985 (aged 24)	1.89 m	66	184	(France) HBC Nîmes

=== Germany ===
Head coach: Rainer Osmann (GER)

No.	Pos.	Name	Date of birth (age)	Height	App.	Goals	Club
1	GK	Sabine Englert	27 November 1981 (aged 28)	1.84 m	166	2	(Denmark) FC Midtjylland Håndbold
2	LW	Nadine Härdter	29 March 1981 (aged 28)	1.66 m	139	218	(Germany) Thüringer HC
3	RB/W	Isabell Klein	28 June 1984 (aged 25)	1.72 m	6	8	(Germany) Buxtehuder SV
5	LB	Ania Rösler	14 May 1982 (aged 27)	1.76 m	51	62	(Germany) HC Leipzig
7	CB	Nina Wörz	14 November 1980 (aged 29)	1.79 m	169	339	(Denmark) Randers HK
9	P	Wiebke Kethorn	10 August 1985 (aged 24)	1.68 m	12	19	(Germany) VfL Oldenburg
10	CB	Anna Loerper	18 November 1984 (aged 25)	1.62 m	115	194	(Germany) TSV Bayer 04 Leverkusen
11	LW	Mandy Hering	11 March 1984 (aged 25)	1.70 m	68	124	(Germany) Frankfurter HC
12	GK	Katja Schülke	18 March 1984 (aged 25)	1.78 m	35	0	(Germany) HC Leipzig
14	RB	Susann Müller	26 May 1988 (aged 21)	1.86 m	30	57	(Germany) HC Leipzig
15	RW	Sabrina Neukamp	10 May 1982 (aged 27)	1.73 m	103	182	(Germany) ProVital Blomberg-Lippe
16	GK	Clara Woltering	2 March 1983 (aged 26)	1.75 m	108	0	(Germany) TSV Bayer 04 Leverkusen
17	LB	Franziska Mietzner	20 December 1988 (aged 20)	1.92 m	14	36	(Germany) Frankfurter HC
18	LB	Laura Steinbach	2 August 1985 (aged 24)	1.81 m	38	48	(Germany) TSV Bayer 04 Leverkusen
19	B	Christine Beier	12 December 1983 (aged 25)	1.78 m	14	15	(Germany) Frankfurter HC
20	P	Anja Althaus	3 September 1982 (aged 27)	1.74 m	160	338	(Denmark) Viborg HK

=== Sweden ===
Head coach: Per Johansson (SWE)

No.	Pos.	Name	Date of birth (age)	Height	App.	Goals	Club
2	LB	Karin Isakson	4 March 1984 (aged 25)	1.76 m	16	20	(Sweden) IK Sävehof
3	P	Kristina Flognman	29 June 1981 (aged 28)	1.78 m	154	293	(Denmark) Odense GOG
4	RW	Matilda Boson	4 December 1981 (aged 28)	1.76 m	146	355	(Denmark) Aalborg DH
5	P	Sara Holmgren	29 March 1979 (aged 30)	1.81 m	127	161	(Germany) HC Leipzig
6	RW	Therese Islas Helgesson	22 July 1983 (aged 26)	1.72 m	66	129	(Denmark) Odense GOG
7	RW	Jenny Wikensten	1 August 1988 (aged 21)	1.70 m	20	35	(Sweden) IK Sävehof
9	LW	Petra Skogsberg	23 March 1984 (aged 25)	1.62 m	56	67	(Denmark) Odense GOG
11	RW	Lisa Viren	23 March 1984 (aged 25)	1.73 m	16	18	(Germany) HC Leipzig
12	GK	Gabriella Kain	25 March 1981 (aged 28)	1.79 m	21	0	(Denmark) Odense GOG
15	CB	Johanna Ahlm	3 November 1987 (aged 22)	1.75 m	52	211	(Denmark) Viborg HK
16	GK	Cecilia Grubbström	2 September 1986 (aged 23)	1.78 m	5	0	(Sweden) IK Sävehof
17	LB	Linnea Torstensson	30 March 1983 (aged 26)	1.86 m	69	263	(Denmark) Aalborg DH
18	P	Johanna Wiberg	6 September 1983 (aged 26)	1.84 m	88	62	(Denmark) FCK Håndbold
20	CB	Isabelle Gulldén	29 June 1989 (aged 20)	1.79 m	38	52	(Sweden) IK Sävehof
23	P	Therese Wallter	29 June 1989 (aged 20)	1.83 m	11	6	(Denmark) Aalborg DH
27	LB	Sabina Jacobsen	24 March 1989 (aged 20)	1.80 m	8	19	(Sweden) Lugi HF

== Group B ==
=== Angola ===
Head coach: Paulo Jorge de Moura Pereira (POR)

No.	Pos.	Name	Date of birth (age)	Height	App.	Goals	Club
1	GK	Maria Odeth Tavares	18 August 1976 (aged 33)	1.70 m	92	0	(Angola) Primeiro de Agosto
2	LW	Joelma Patricia Viegas	15 October 1986 (aged 23)	1.68 m			(Angola) Primeiro de Agosto
3	P	Anastácia Sibo	27 May 1982 (aged 27)	1.89 m			(Angola) Petroleos de Luanda
4	LB	Elzira Tavares	13 May 1980 (aged 29)	1.85 m	4	17	(Angola) Petroleos de Luanda
5	RW	Matilde Andre	11 February 1986 (aged 23)	1.71 m			(Angola) Petroleos de Luanda
6	RW	Carolina Martene Morais	13 April 1986 (aged 23)	1.67 m			(Angola) Primeiro de Agosto
7	P	Constantina Paulo	8 January 1983 (aged 26)	1.85 m			(Angola) Primeiro de Agosto
9	RB	Wuta Waco Bige Dombaxe	5 April 1986 (aged 23)	1.67 m			(Angola) Primeiro de Agosto
11	GK	Luisa Kiala	25 January 1982 (aged 27)	1.74 m	68	102	(Angola) Petroleos de Luanda
12	CB	Lurdes Marcelina Manuel Monteiro	11 July 1985 (aged 24)	1.68 m			(Angola) Primeiro de Agosto
13	P	Nelma Isabel Pedro	12 February 1982 (aged 27)	1.80 m			(Angola) Primeiro de Agosto
14	CB	Natalia Maria Bernardo	25 December 1986 (aged 22)	1.70 m	43	12	(Angola) Petroleos de Luanda
15	RB	Azenaide Carlos	14 June 1990 (aged 19)	1.74 m	4	0	(Angola) Primeiro de Agosto
16	GK	Maria Rosa Pedro	29 December 1982 (aged 26)	1.72 m			(Angola) Petroleos de Luanda
17		Acilene Sebastiao	23 March 1987 (aged 22)	1.72 m			(Angola) Petroleos de Luanda
24	GK	Cristina Branco	15 March 1985 (aged 24)	1.72 m	36	0	(Angola) Primeiro de Agosto

=== Australia ===
Head coach: Katsuhiko Kinoshita (JPN)

- Jemina Harbort
- Allira Hudson-Gofers
- Veronica Kelly
- Solveig Sorensen
- Raelene Boulton
- Mary Kelly
- Catherine Kent
- Madeline McAfee
- Rosalie Boyd
- Victoria Brunsberg
- Melissa Mellor
- Gizelle van der Merwe
- Aminta Thomas
- Jessica Fearnside

=== Austria ===
Head coach: Herbert Müller (GER)

No.	Pos.	Name	Date of birth (age)	Height	App.	Goals	Club
1	GK	Julia Hämmerle	18 March 1991 (aged 18)	1.70 m	2	0	(Austria) HC Lustenau
4		Beate Scheffknecht	27 February 1990 (aged 19)	1.71 m	31	81	(Germany) SG BBM Bietigheim
5		Sonja Frey	22 April 1993 (aged 16)	1.77 m	2	1	(Austria) MGA Fivers
6		Karla Ivancok	4 November 1992 (aged 17)	1.76 m	2	0	(Austria) Hypo Niederösterreich
7		Stephanie Subke	17 March 1981 (aged 28)	1.78 m	188	650	Without club
9		Laura Magelinskas	23 September 1989 (aged 20)	1.72 m	60	106	(Germany) TV Beyeröhde
10		Marina Budecevic	25 November 1982 (aged 27)	1.84 m	57	80	(Germany) TV Mainzlar
11		Katharina Doppler	10 December 1990 (aged 18)	1.80 m	6	19	(Germany) SG Greven 09
12	GK	Natascha Schilk	6 July 1989 (aged 20)	1.81 m	42	0	(Austria) Hypo Niederösterreich
14		Nina Stumvoll	16 June 1989 (aged 20)	1.80 m	48	47	(Germany) SG Greven 09
15		Sabrina Stumvoll	14 September 1990 (aged 19)	1.83 m	13	8	(Germany) SG Greven 09
16	GK	Petra Blazek	15 June 1987 (aged 22)	1.83 m	89	0	(Austria) Hypo Niederösterreich
17		Isabel Plach	19 April 1987 (aged 22)	1.62 m	78	96	(Austria) Hypo Niederösterreich
18		Roman Grausenburger	14 November 1989 (aged 20)	1.72 m	7	3	(Austria) Hypo Niederösterreich
19		Katrin Engel	2 May 1984 (aged 25)	1.71 m	138	444	(Germany) Bayer Leverkusen
80		Simona Spiridon	1 February 1980 (aged 29)	1.70 m	71	274	(Hungary) Györi Audi ETO KC

=== Russia ===
Head coach: Yevgeni Trefilov (RUS)

No.	Pos.	Name	Date of birth (age)	Height	App.	Goals	Club
1	GK	Inna Suslina	4 May 1979 (aged 30)	1.84 m	72	0	(Russia) Zvezda Zvenigorod
5	LB	Lyudmila Postnova	11 August 1984 (aged 25)	1.83 m	129	483	(Russia) Lada Togliatti
6	LW	Tatiana Dronina	16 November 1978 (aged 31)	1.70 m	8	22	(Russia) Zvezda Zvenigorod
7	LW	Yelena Dmitriyeva	1 July 1983 (aged 26)	1.75 m	76	158	(Russia) Zvezda Zvenigorod
11	CB	Olga Levina	4 March 1985 (aged 24)	1.80 m	54	156	(Russia) HC Dinamo Volgograd
13	RW	Marina Yartseva	17 February 1989 (aged 20)	1.65 m	10	23	(Russia) Rostov-Don
14	P	Ksenia Makeeva	19 September 1990 (aged 19)	1.85 m	6	4	(Russia) HC Dinamo Volgograd
15	P	Maya Petrova	26 May 1982 (aged 27)	1.78 m	18	22	(Russia) Rostov-Don
16	GK	Anna Sedoykina	1 August 1984 (aged 25)	1.90 m	43	0	(Russia) HC Dinamo Volgograd
17	CB	Yekaterina Andryushina	17 August 1985 (aged 24)	1.85 m	72	177	(Russia) Zvezda Zvenigorod
18	LB	Nadezhda Muravyeva	30 June 1980 (aged 29)	1.86 m	129	270	(Russia) Lada Togliatti
19	P	Ekaterina Vetkova	1 August 1986 (aged 23)	1.82 m	26	47	(Russia) Zvezda Zvenigorod
21	LB	Victoria Zhilinskayte	6 March 1989 (aged 20)	1.88 m	20	26	(Russia) Lada Togliatti
24	LB	Oxana Koroleva	17 July 1984 (aged 25)	1.85 m	55	85	(Russia) Zvezda Zvenigorod
25	LW	Emiliya Turey	6 October 1984 (aged 25)	1.75 m	128	419	(Denmark) FCK Håndbold
26	CB	Tatiana Khmyrova	6 February 1990 (aged 19)	1.78 m	6	18	(Russia) HC Dinamo Volgograd

=== Thailand ===
Head coach: Klaus Bøge (DEN)

- Keeratika Lokam
- Thippawan Wongmak
- Jitthita Sipak
- Vanpen Sila
- Taweeporn Meephian
- Jatuporn Phonsen
- Nantiya Chawdorn
- Pattarasiri Thanawat
- Pri Nontawongskulsiri
- Soonyakan Panyim
- Panida Nongrueang
- Nattha Suphasanan
- Wongduean Sawatpon
- Nualjan Supaphan
- Panpimon Boonnam
- Areerat Pinitmontree

=== Ukraine ===
Head coach: Leonid Yevtushenko (UKR)

No.	Pos.	Name	Date of birth (age)	Height	App.	Goals	Club
1	GK	Tetyana Chukhno	30 August 1986 (aged 23)	1.85 m	13	4	(Ukraine) HC Spartak Kyiv
2	LB	Liliia Gorilska	26 February 1988 (aged 21)	1.87 m	19	8	(Ukraine) HC Smart
3	RW	Mariya Boklashchuk	4 September 1979 (aged 30)	1.70 m	40	76	(Spain) Rocasa G. C. ACE
4	LB	Anastasiia Pidpalova	5 January 1982 (aged 27)	1.92 m	35	138	(Romania) CS Oltchim
5	CB	Viktoriia Tsybulenko	31 March 1978 (aged 31)	1.76 m	13	35	(Ukraine) HC Smart
6	RW	Iuliia Manaharova	27 September 1988 (aged 21)	1.66 m	39	105	(Ukraine) HC Smart
7	LW	Viktoriya Borshchenko	5 January 1986 (aged 23)	1.72 m	71	66	(Ukraine) HC Smart
11	P	Viktoriya Shkliaruk	19 November 1979 (aged 30)	1.66 m	39	105	(Slovakia) IUVENTA Michalovce
12	GK	Viktoriya Tymoshenkova	4 November 1983 (aged 26)	1.83 m	39	0	(Russia) Dinamo Volgograd
13	LW	Nataliya Lyapina	14 May 1976 (aged 33)	1.68 m	63	250	(Ukraine) Podatkova Akademiya
14	CB	Alla Sheiko	13 May 1988 (aged 21)	1.76 m	22	49	(Ukraine) HC Dnepryanka Kherson
15	P	Tetyana Sapronenko	29 November 1980 (aged 29)	1.80 m	3	3	(Ukraine) HC Galychanka
16	GK	Natalya Vysotska	21 March 1979 (aged 30)	1.80 m	8	1	(Ukraine) HC Smart
17	RB	Olha Nikolayenko	5 April 1983 (aged 26)	1.78 m	22	88	(Hungary) HNKC FE

== Group C ==
=== Chile ===
Head coach: Alejandro Gutiérrez (ARG)

1. Gabriela Mendoza (c)
2. Pamela Flores
3. Carla Sciaraffia
4. Belen Canessa
5. Pamela Vera
6. Gisele Angel
7. Paula Cajas
8. Maria Letellier
9. Maria Valenzuela
10. Inga Feuchtmann
11. Valeria Flores
12. Andrea Cisterna
13. Maria Musalem
14. Nicole Lanos
15. Daniela Ceza
16. Daniela Canessa

=== Hungary ===
Head coach: Eszter Mátéfi (HUN)

No.	Pos.	Name	Date of birth (age)	Height	App.	Goals	Club
1	GK	Melinda Pastrovics	28 May 1981 (aged 28)	1.76 m	19	0	(Hungary) Alcoa FKC
2	LB	Szandra Zácsik	22 April 1990 (aged 19)	1.83 m	8	18	(Slovenia) RK Krim
3	LW	Orsolya Vérten	22 July 1982 (aged 27)	1.70 m	97	282	(Hungary) Győri Audi ETO KC
7	CB	Zita Szucsánszki	22 May 1987 (aged 22)	1.73 m	38	107	(Hungary) Ferencvárosi TC
8	CB	Anikó Kovacsics	29 August 1991 (aged 18)	1.75 m	6	9	(Hungary) Győri Audi ETO KC
10	LB	Anita Bulath	20 September 1983 (aged 26)	1.80 m	19	43	(Hungary) DVSC
11	P	Valéria Szabó	2 March 1983 (aged 26)	1.81 m	15	19	(Hungary) DVSC
12	GK	Orsolya Herr	23 November 1984 (aged 25)	1.76 m	76	0	(Hungary) Váci NKSE
14	P	Katalin Tóth	25 June 1984 (aged 25)	1.74 m	9	22	(Hungary) Békéscsabai Előre NKSE
17	LB	Tímea Tóth	16 September 1980 (aged 29)	1.82 m	135	419	(Hungary) Váci NKSE
21	GK	Ágnes Triffa	18 January 1987 (aged 22)	1.76 m	19	0	(Hungary) DVSC
22	RW	Bernadett Bódi	9 March 1986 (aged 23)	1.75 m	37	46	(Hungary) Békéscsabai Előre NKSE
23	LB	Klára Szekeres	1 December 1987 (aged 22)	1.86 m	3	1	(Hungary) Békéscsabai Előre NKSE
25	RW	Adrienn Orbán	1 October 1986 (aged 23)	1.68 m	9	20	(Hungary) Győri Audi ETO KC
33	LW	Gabriella Juhász	19 March 1985 (aged 24)	1.70 m	4	2	(Hungary) DVSC
87	RB	Zsuzsanna Tomori	18 June 1987 (aged 22)	1.86 m	58	117	(Hungary) Győri Audi ETO KC

=== Japan ===
Head coach: Hwang Kyung-Young (KOR)

- Megumi Takahashi
- Shiori Kamimachi
- Aimi Ito
- Akie Uegaki
- Akina Shinjo
- Hitomi Sakugawa
- Tomoko Sakamoto
- Shio Fujii (C)
- Aya Nakasone
- Karina Maki
- Hiromi Tashiro
- Yuko Arihama
- Kaoru Yokoshima
- Mayuko Ishitate
- Kaori Fujima
- Yuki Tanabe

=== Norway ===
Head coach: Thorir Hergeirsson (ISL)

No.	Pos.	Name	Date of birth (age)	Height	App.	Goals	Club
1	GK	Kari Aalvik Grimsbø	4 January 1985 (aged 24)	1.80 m	50	0	(Norway) Byåsen IL
2	LB	Renate Urne	11 June 1982 (aged 27)	1.83 m	17	13	(Germany) HC Leipzig
5	CB	Ida Alstad	13 June 1985 (aged 24)	1.72 m	11	26	(Norway) Byåsen IL
6	P	Heidi Løke	12 December 1982 (aged 26)	1.77 m	35	96	(Norway) Larvik HK
7	RW	Tonje Nøstvold	7 May 1985 (aged 24)	1.78 m	109	270	(Denmark) FC Midtjylland Håndbold
8	B	Karoline Dyhre Breivang	10 May 1980 (aged 29)	1.72 m	187	339	(Norway) Larvik HK
9	CB	Kristine Lunde-Borgersen (captain)	30 March 1980 (aged 29)	1.83 m	140	420	(Denmark) Viborg HK
11	LW	Kari Mette Johansen	11 January 1979 (aged 30)	1.72 m	141	382	(Norway) Larvik HK
12	GK	Terese Pedersen	27 April 1980 (aged 29)	1.83 m	77	0	(Austria) Hypo Niederösterreich
13	P	Marit Malm Frafjord	25 November 1985 (aged 24)	1.82 m	93	201	(Norway) Byåsen IL
14	LB	Tonje Larsen	26 January 1975 (aged 34)	1.83 m	246	545	(Norway) Larvik HK
16	GK	Katrine Lunde Haraldsen	30 March 1980 (aged 29)	1.81 m	145	3	(Denmark) Viborg HK
18	RB	Linn-Kristin Riegelhuth	1 August 1984 (aged 25)	1.76 m	142	551	(Denmark) FCK Handball
20	LB	Tine Stange	14 May 1986 (aged 23)	1.80 m	18	27	(Norway) Larvik HK
21	CB	Anja Edin	5 February 1983 (aged 26)	1.78 m	16	39	(Norway) Storhamar HE
23	LW	Camilla Herrem	8 October 1986 (aged 23)	1.67 m	50	123	(Norway) Byåsen IL

=== Romania ===
Head coach: Radu Voina (ROU)

No.	Pos.	Name	Date of birth (age)	Height	App.	Goals	Club
2	LW	Ramona Maier	14 July 1979 (aged 30)	1.70 m	152	527	(Romania) CS Oltchim Râmnicu Vâlcea
5	LB	Carmen Amariei	3 September 1978 (aged 31)	1.84 m	141	733	(Denmark) FCK Handball
6	P	Florina Chintoan	6 December 1985 (aged 23)	1.78 m	50	41	(Romania) CS Universitatea Cluj-Napoca
7	RW	Adriana Nechita	14 November 1983 (aged 26)	1.72 m	58	141	(Romania) CS Oltchim Râmnicu Vâlcea
8	LB	Cristina Neagu	26 August 1988 (aged 21)	1.78 m	60	215	(Romania) CS Oltchim Râmnicu Vâlcea
9	LW	Iulia Puscasu	8 April 1982 (aged 27)	1.70 m	34	55	(Romania) CS Oltchim Râmnicu Vâlcea
10	P	Ionela Stanca	9 January 1981 (aged 28)	1.76 m	87	158	(Romania) CS Oltchim Râmnicu Vâlcea
11	P	Oana Manea	18 April 1985 (aged 24)	1.76 m	58	92	(Romania) CS Oltchim Râmnicu Vâlcea
12	GK	Paula Ungureanu	30 March 1980 (aged 29)	1.80 m	71	1	(Romania) CS Oltchim Râmnicu Vâlcea
13	RW	Cristina Vărzaru	5 December 1979 (aged 30)	1.70 m	138	364	(Denmark) Viborg HK
14	RB	Ada Moldovan	15 November 1983 (aged 26)	1.74 m	2	0	(Romania) HC Dunărea Brăila
16	GK	Florentina Stanciu	28 July 1982 (aged 27)	1.82 m	13	0	(Iceland) UMF Stjarnan
18	CB	Adina Fiera	11 August 1985 (aged 24)	1.82 m	100	269	(Romania) CS Oltchim Râmnicu Vâlcea
20	LB	Mihaela Tivadar	14 June 1982 (aged 27)	1.78 m	57	72	(Romania) HCM Roman
25	LB	Clara Vădineanu	26 October 1982 (aged 27)	1.82 m	19	44	(Romania) CS Oltchim Râmnicu Vâlcea
55	RB	Melinda Geiger	26 March 1987 (aged 22)	1.76 m	20	27	(Romania) HCM Baia Mare
99	CB	Narcisa Lecușanu	14 September 1976 (aged 33)	1.82 m	107	269	(Romania) CS Oltchim Râmnicu Vâlcea

=== Tunisia ===
Head coach: Fathi Cherif (TUN)

- Noura Ben Slama
- Nesrine Daoula
- Elhem Gherissi
- Asma Elghaoui
- Jihene Ben Cheikh Ahmed
- Hela Msaad
- Raja Toumi (C)
- Chourouk Daly
- Wafa Cherif
- Manel Kouki
- Fadia Omrani
- Ouided Kilani
- Haifa Abdelhak
- Mouna Chebbah
- Ines Khouildi
- Sameh Ghanmi

== Group D ==
=== Argentina ===
Head coach: Daniel Marcos Zeballos (ARG)

1. Nadia Ayelen Bordon
2. Noelia Sala
3. Luciana Mendoza
4. Antonella Gambino
5. Bibiana Ferrea
6. Magdalena Decilio
7. Maria Pilar Romero
8. Amelia Belotti
9. Natacha Melillo
10. Victoria Crivelli
11. Antonela Mena
12. Valentina Kogan
13. Maria Emilia Acosta
14. Valeria Bianchi
15. Silvana Totolo
16. Carla Simonato

=== China ===
Head coach: Wang Xindong (CHN)

- Xu Mo
- Wei Qiuxiang
- Guo Wei
- Ling Ma
- Wang Ru
- Yao Li
- Wang Shasha
- Lan Xiaoling
- Hong Huang
- Liu Xiaomei
- Sun Mengying
- Weiwei Li
- Zhao Jiangchuan
- Zhao Jiaqin
- Gong Yan
- Zhengwen Sha
- Jiang Yingying
- Wu Yin

=== Ivory Coast ===
Head coach: Thierry Vincent (FRA)

- Rachel Kuyo
- Adeline Koudou
- Sandrine Koffi Affoue
- N'Cho Elodie Mambo
- Celine Dongo
- Christiane Guede
- Alimata Dosso
- Paula Gondo-Bredou
- Marie Josee Tagro
- Edwige Marie J. Zadi
- Madina Toualy
- Gladys Kangah
- Awa Karamoko
- Olive Assemon
- Fatima Samagoulougou
- Robeace Abogny
- Christine Koffi
- Eliane Koabenan

=== Kazakhstan ===
Head coach: Lev Yaniev (KAZ)

1. Yevgeniya Nikolayeva
2. Darya Nadeina
3. Rizagul Mukanova
4. Marina Pikalova
5. Yevgeniya Latkina
6. Yelena Kozlova
7. Olga Yegunova
8. Yekaterina Mishurina
9. Alessya Yunussova
10. Mariya Svakhina
11. Natalya Kubrina
12. Yelena Suyazova
13. Tatyana Chumakova
14. Anastassiya Rodina
15. Alexandra Yefimova

=== South Korea ===
Head coach: Lee Jae-Young (KOR)

- Hui Ju
- Sunhee Woo
- Ona Kim
- Eunbi Lee
- Nyunhwa Nam
- Jihae Jung
- Hanna Gwon
- Chayoun Kim
- Seonmi Lee
- Kyeongha Moon
- Hyunji Yoo
- Jihey Kang
- Bokhee Myoung
- Minhee Lee
- Hyegyung Park
- Pilhee Yu

=== Spain ===
Head coach: Jorge Dueñas (ESP)

No.	Pos.	Name	Date of birth (age)	Height	App.	Goals	Club
1	GK	Cristina González	6 August 1983 (aged 26)	1.79 m	39	0	(Spain) C.Le.Ba León
2	RW	Marta López	4 February 1990 (aged 19)	1.65 m	3	8	(Spain) BM Alcobendas
3	CB	Andrea Barnó	4 January 1980 (aged 29)	1.74 m	20	20	(Spain) Itxako Reyno de Navarra
4	RW	Carmen Martín	29 May 1988 (aged 21)	1.69 m	48	86	(Spain) Mar Alicante
6	LB	Nely Carla Alberto	2 July 1983 (aged 26)	1.79 m	21	55	(Spain) Itxako Reyno de Navarra
7	LB	Beatriz Fernández	19 March 1985 (aged 24)	1.80 m	68	172	(Spain) Mar Alicante
8	P	Verónica Cuadrado	8 March 1979 (aged 30)	1.82 m	88	87	(Spain) BM Sagunto
9	RB	Marta Mangué	23 April 1983 (aged 26)	1.70 m	154	608	(Denmark) Team Esbjerg
10	CB	Macarena Aguilar	12 March 1985 (aged 24)	1.70 m	90	256	(Spain) Itxako Reyno de Navarra
11	RB	Nuria Benzal	3 April 1985 (aged 24)	1.69 m	17	26	(Spain) Mar Alicante
12	GK	Mihaela Ciobanu	30 January 1973 (aged 36)	1.75 m	22	0	(Spain) BM Elche
14	LB	Elisabet Chávez	17 November 1990 (aged 19)	1.92 m	21	0	(Spain) BM Sagunto
17	LW	Elisabeth Pinedo	13 May 1981 (aged 28)	1.74 m	52	96	(Spain) Itxako Reyno de Navarra
18	P	Begoña Fernández	22 March 1980 (aged 29)	1.82 m	104	214	(Spain) Itxako Reyno de Navarra
20	LW	Noelia Oncina (captain)	11 November 1976 (aged 33)	1.66 m	160	389	(Spain) BM Sagunto
26	P	Mari Cruz Asensi	26 December 1981 (aged 27)	1.73 m	8	2	(Spain) BM Femenino Elda
