= Cherif =

Chérif or Cherif may refer to:

== People ==
=== Surname ===
- Ahmed Bey (1784–1850), last Bey of Constantine, Algeria, ruling from 1826 to 1848
- Cipriano Rivas Cherif (1891–1967), Spanish playwright and director, owner of the Caracol Theatre Club
- Mahmoud Cherif (1912–1987), Algerian military leader and politician
- Moulay Ali Cherif (died 1659), allegedly a descendant of l-Hesn d-Dakhl, considered to have been the founder of the Alaouite Dynasty of Morocco
- Sid Ali Yahia-Chérif (born 1985), Algerian football player
- Wafa Cherif (born 1986), Tunisian handball goalkeeper
- Walid Cherif (born 1978), Tunisian boxer

=== Given name ===
- Abdennour Chérif El-Ouazzani (born 1986), Algerian football player
- Chérif Abdeslam (born 1978), Algerian football player
- M. Cherif Bassiouni (1937–2017), Muslim international United Nations war crimes expert
- Cherif Guellal (1932–2009), Algerian businessman and diplomat who fought in the Algerian independence movement
- Cherif Mohamed Aly Aidara (born 1959), Senegalese-Mauritanian Shi'i religious leader
- Chérif Oudjani (born 1964), former football player
- Chérif Ousmane Sarr (born 1986), midfielder
- Chérif Souleymane (born 1944), former Guinean footballer
- Chérif Touré Mamam (born 1978), Togolese footballer
- Mohand Chérif Hannachi (born 1950), former Algerian football player and current chairman of Algerian club JS Kabylie
- Tahar Chérif El-Ouazzani (born 1967), Algerian footballer and coach

== Other uses ==
- Sherif
- Zawiyet Sidi Amar Cherif, zawiya in Boumerdès Province, Algeria
- Aïn Sidi Chérif, town and commune in Mostaganem Province, Algeria
- Cherif (TV series), a French police series which first aired in 2013
- Cherif Al Idrissi Airport (IATA: AHU, ICAO: GMTA), an airport serving Al Hoceima, Morocco, the capital city of the Taza-Al Hoceima-Taounate region in northern Morocco
- Miss Webster and Chérif, a novel by Patricia Duncker first published in 2006
- Moulay Ali Cherif Airport (IATA: ERH, ICAO: GMFK), an airport serving Errachidia (Er-Rachidia), a town in the Meknès-Tafilalet region in Morocco
- Chérif Chekatt, the perpetrator of the 2018 Strasbourg attack
