= Hanna Yttereng =

Norwegian handball player (born 1991)

Hanna Maria Yttereng
Personal information
- Full name: Hanna Yttereng
- Nationality: Norwegian
- Born: 20 February 1991 (age 35) Trondheim, Norway
- Height: 1.84 m (6 ft 0 in)

Sport
- Sport: Handball
- Position: Pivot

Senior clubs
- Years: Team
- –2006: Klæbu IL
- 2006–2009: Byåsen HE
- 2009–2010: Selbu IL
- 2010–2011: Byåsen HE
- 2011–2012: Utleira IL
- 2012–2014: Levanger HK
- 2014–2017: SG BBM Bietigheim
- 2017: Kisvárdai KC
- 2017–2018: Byåsen HE
- 2018–2022: Vipers Kristiansand
National team
| Years | Team | Apps | (Gls) |
| 2011–2014 | Norway | 9 | (5) |
Medal record
Junior World Championship
| Gold medal – first place | 2010 South Korea |
Junior European Championship
| Gold medal – first place | 2009 Hungary |

Hanna Maria Yttereng (born 20 February 1991) is a former Norwegian handball player who last played for Vipers Kristiansand.

== Achievements ==
- Junior World Championship:
  - Gold Medalist: 2010
- Junior European Championship:
  - Gold Medalist: 2009
- EHF Champions League:
  - Winner: 2020/2021, 2021/2022
  - Bronze Medalist: 2018/2019
- EHF Cup:
  - Finalist: 2017
- Norwegian League:
  - Winner: 2018/2019, 2019/2020, 2020/2021, 2021/2022
- Norwegian Cup:
  - Winner: 2007, 2018, 2019, 2020, 2021
  - Finalist: 2006, 2008
