= Maike Schirmer =

German handball player (born 1990)

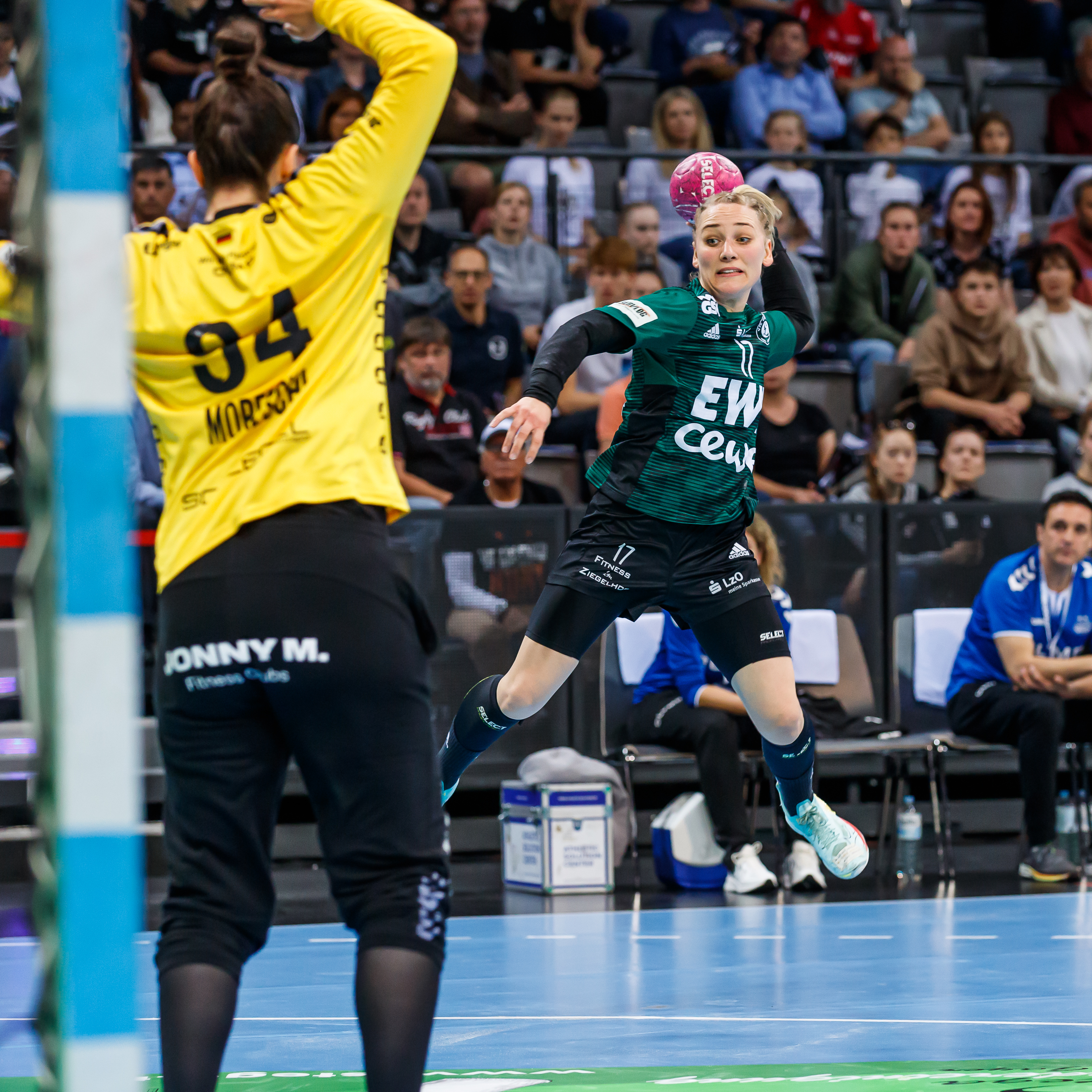

Personal information
- Nationality: German
- Born: 23 May 1990 (age 36) Kaltenkirchen, West Germany
- Height: 1.65 m (5 ft 5 in)

Sport
- Sport: Handball
- Position: Right wing
- Current club: VfL Oldenburg
- Number: 17

Senior clubs
- Years: Team
- –: TuS Hartenholm
- –2005: SG Kisdorf/Leezen
- 2005-2008: VfL Bad Schwartau
- 2008-2016: VfL Oldenburg
- 2016-2020: Buxtehuder SV
- 2020-2021: Toulon Saint-Cyr Var Handball (France)
- 2021-2022: VfL Oldenburg
National team
Years	Team	Apps	(Gls)
2012-2022	Germany	28	(38)

Maike Schirmer (born 25 May 1990) is a German former handball player, who played for VfL Oldenburg, Buxtehuder SV, VfL Bad Schwartau, SG Kisdorf/Leezen and TuS Hartenholm in Germany and Toulon Saint-Cyr Var Handball in France, as well as the German national team.

Schirmer debuted for the national team in 2012. She was selected as part of the German team for the 2017 World Women's Handball Championship. She started playing handball at SG Kisdorf/Leezen. In 2005 she switched to VfL Bad Schwartau, where she played in the German Regionalliga. After three years she switched to Bundesliga-side VfL Oldenburg. Here she won the DHB-Pokal in 2009 and in 2012. In 2010 she reached the semifinals of the EHF Cup Winners' Cup.

In 2016 she transferred to Buxtehuder SV, where she once again won the DHB-Pokal in 2017.

She retired in 2022.
