= Karoline de Souza =

Brazilian handball player (born 1990)

Karoline Souza
Personal information
- Full name: Karoline Helena de Souza
- Born: 24 April 1990 (age 36) Paranaguá, Brazil
- Height: 1.81 m (5 ft 11 in)

Sport
- Sport: Handball
- Position: Left back
- Current club: CS Minaur Baia Mare
- Number: 90

Senior clubs
- Years: Team
- –: AD Estrela de Guarulhos
- –2011: UCS Caxias do Sul
- 2011–2012: Siófok KC
- 2012–2013: Hypo Niederösterreich
- 2013–2014: TTH Holstebro
- 2014–2016: Nykøbing Falster
- 2016–2019: Váci NKSE
- 2019–2020: Mosonmagyaróvári KC SE
- 2020–2022: CS Minaur Baia Mare
- 2022–2024: HC Dunărea Brăila
- 2024–: CSM Iași 2020
National team
Years	Team	Apps	(Gls)
2011-	Brazil	71	(53)
Medal record
World Championship
Gold medal – first place	2013 Serbia
Pan American Championship
Gold medal – first place	2011 Brazil
Gold medal – first place	2015 Cuba
South and Central American Championship
Gold medal – first place	2018 Brazil
Gold medal – first place	2022 Argentina
- Updated on 1 September 2024

Karoline Helena de Souza (born 24 April 1990) is a Brazilian handball player for CS Minaur Baia Mare (women's handball) and for the Brazilian national team. She is a world champion from 2013.

== Career ==
Karoline de Souza started her career at AD Estrela de Guarulhos followed by UCS Caxias do Sul. In January 2011 she joined Hungarian team Siófok KC. In the summer of 2012 she joined Austrian Hypo Niederösterreich. Here she won the 2013 Austrian championship, ÖHB Cup and EHF Cup Winners' Cup.

In 2013 she joined Danish side Team Tvis Holstebro. In 2014 she joined league rivals Nykøbing Falster Håndboldklub.

In 2016 she returned to Hungary and joined Ipress Center-Vác. In 2019 she joined Mosonmagyaróvári KC SE. A year later she joined Romanian CS Minaur Baia Mare. In 2022 she joined league rivals HC Dunărea Brăila. In 2024 she joined CSM Iași 2020.

=== National team ===
Karoline de Souza debuted for the Brazilian national team in 2011. In 2013 she won the 2013 World Championship; Brazil's and South America's first ever World Cup title. She also won the 2011 and 2015 Pan American Championships.

== Achievements ==
- Romanian Cup:
  - Silver medal: 2024
  - Bronze medal: 2023
- EHF European League:
  - Bronze medal: 2024, 2021
- Romanian Super Cup:
  - Bronze medal: 2023
- Romanian Championship:
  - Silver medal: 2021
- Central and South American Championship:
  - Gold medal: 2018 (Brazil), 2022 (Argentina)
- Pan American Championship:
  - Gold medal: 2011, 2015
- World Championship:
  - Gold medal: 2013
- Women Handball Austria:
  - Winner: 2013
- ÖHB Cup:
  - Winner: 2013
- EHF Cup Winners' Cup:
  - Winner: 2013
