= Marlene Kalf =

German handball player (born 1990)

Personal information
- Nationality: German
- Born: 6 January 1990 (age 36) Landau, Germany
- Height: 1.70 m (5 ft 7 in)

Sport
- Sport: Handball
- Position: Right back
- Current club: TuS Metzingen
- Number: 2

Youth career
- Years: Team
- 1995–2005: TV Wörth
- 2005–2009: TSG Ketsch

Senior clubs
- Years: Team
- 2006–2009: TSG Ketsch
- 2009–2014: Bayer 04 Leverkusen
- 2014–2022: TuS Metzingen
National team
Years	Team	Apps	(Gls)
2010–2022	Germany	105	(238)

Marlene Kalf (previously Zapf; born 6 January 1990) is a German former handball player. She played for TSG Ketsch, Bayer 04 Leverkusen and TuS Metzingen as well as the German national team.

She made her international debut on 28 November 2010 against Austria.

In 2010 she won the DHB Pokal with Bayer 04 Leverkusen.

After her playing career she has worked as primary school teacher in Metzingen.
