= Laura Kamdop =

Senegalese handball player (born 1990)

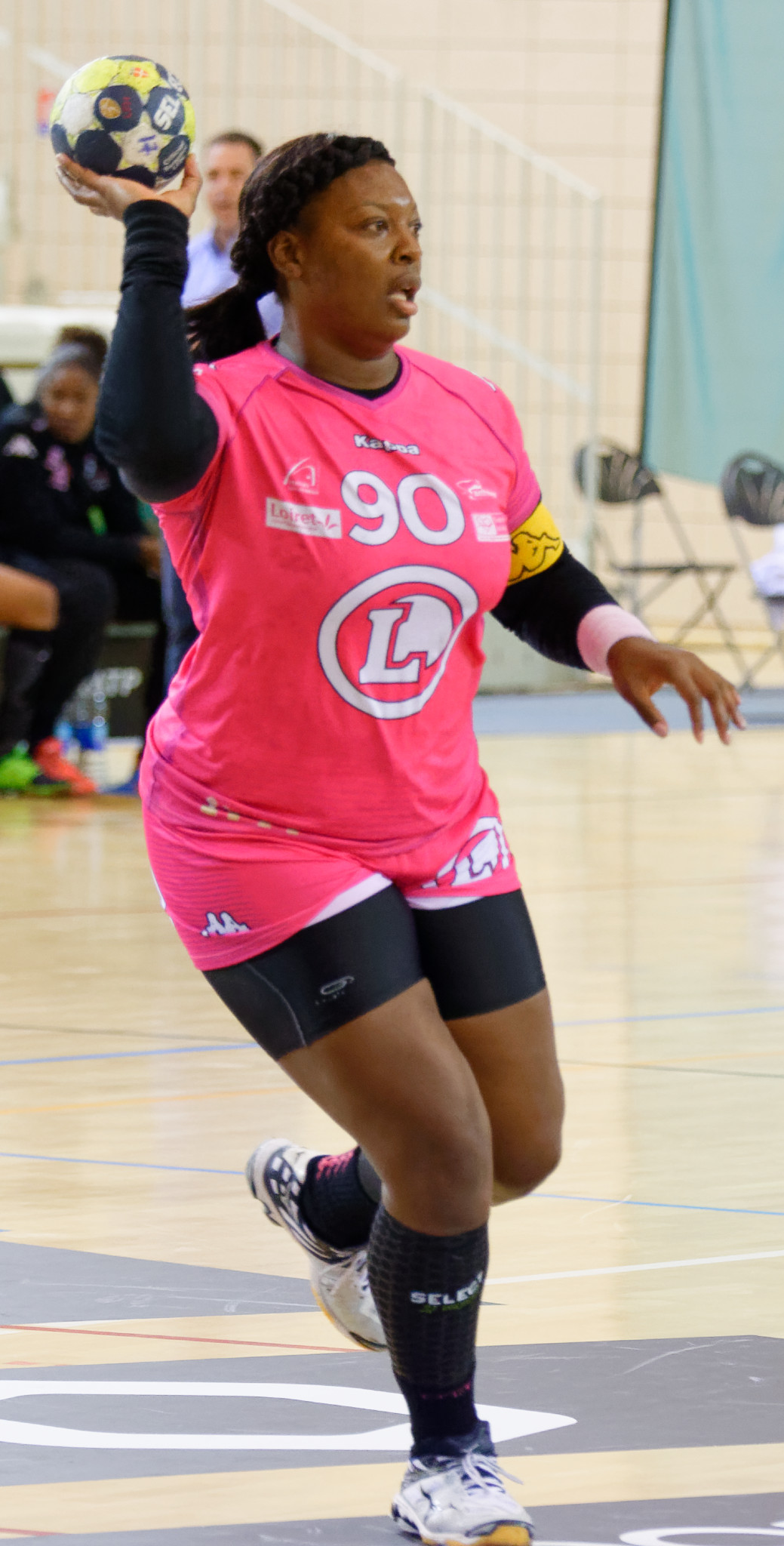
- Kamdop in 2017

Personal information
- Nationality: Senegalese
- Born: 14 September 1990 (age 36) Chartres, France
- Height: 1.82 m (6 ft 0 in)

Sport
- Sport: Handball
- Position: Pivot
- Current club: Fleury Loiret HB
- Number: 90

Senior clubs
- Years: Team
- 2009–2016: Fleury Loiret HB
- 2016–2017: RK Krim
- 2017–: Fleury Loiret HB
National team
Years	Team	Apps	(Gls)
2014	France	3	(1)
2017–	Senegal		

Laura Kamdop (born 14 September 1990) is a French-born Senegalese handball player for Fleury Loiret HB and the Senegalese national team. She has previously played for the French national team.

She competed at the 2019 World Women's Handball Championship in Japan representing Senegal.

== Achievements ==
- EHF Cup Winners' Cup:
  - Finalist: 2015
- Slovenian First League:
  - Winner: 2017
- Slovenian Cup:
  - Winner: 2017
- Coupe de France:
  - Winner: 2014
- Coupe de la Ligue:
  - Winner: 2015, 2016

== See also ==
- List of sportspeople who competed for more than one nation
