= Christine Beier =

German handball player (born 1983)

Personal information
- Nationality: German
- Born: 12 December 1983 (age 42) Kyritz, Germany
- Height: 1.78 m (5 ft 10 in)

Sport
- Sport: Handball
- Position: Right back
- Current club: Retired
- Number: 20
National team
Years	Team	Apps	(Gls)
2009-2017	Germany	58	(66)

Christine Beier (born 12 December 1983) is a German retired handball player who played for Spreefüxxe Berlin, SV Lokomotive Rangsdorf, SV Berliner VG 49 and Frankfurter Handball Club. She retired in 2017. She also featured in the German national team.
