= Jihene Ben Cheikh Ahmed =

Tunisian handball player

Jihene Ben Cheikh Ahmed (born 21 December 1985) is a Tunisian handball player. She plays on the Tunisian national team, and participated at the 2009 World Women's Handball Championship in chine.2011 World Women's Handball Championship in Brazil.
