= Christina Krogshede =

Danish handball player (born 1981)

Personal information
- Nationality: Danish
- Born: 4 November 1981 (age 44) Frederiksberg, Denmark
- Height: 1.72 m (5 ft 8 in)

Sport
- Sport: Handball
- Position: Playmaker
- Current club: Retired

Senior clubs
- Years: Team
- -2002: Frederiksberg IF
- 2002–2006: FC København Håndbold
- 2008–2009: Randers HK
- 2009–2010: FC København Håndbold
- 2010–2013: Frederiksberg IF
- 2013–2015: København Håndbold
- 2013–2015: Ajax København
- 2015–2021: Frederiksberg IF
National team
| Years | Team | Apps | (Gls) |
| 2002–2012 | Denmark | 94 | (153) |

Christina Krogshede (born 1981) is a Danish former team handball player,. She played for the Danish women's national handball team and a multitude of Danish clubs. She has won both the Danish League and EHF Champions League.

At the 2010 European Women's Handball Championship she reached the bronze final and placed fourth with the Danish team.

After her playing career she has worked as a Physiotherapist, and in 2021 she acted as a sports commentator during the 2020 Summer Olympics in Tokyo.
