= Irina Nikitina =

Russian handball player (born 1990)

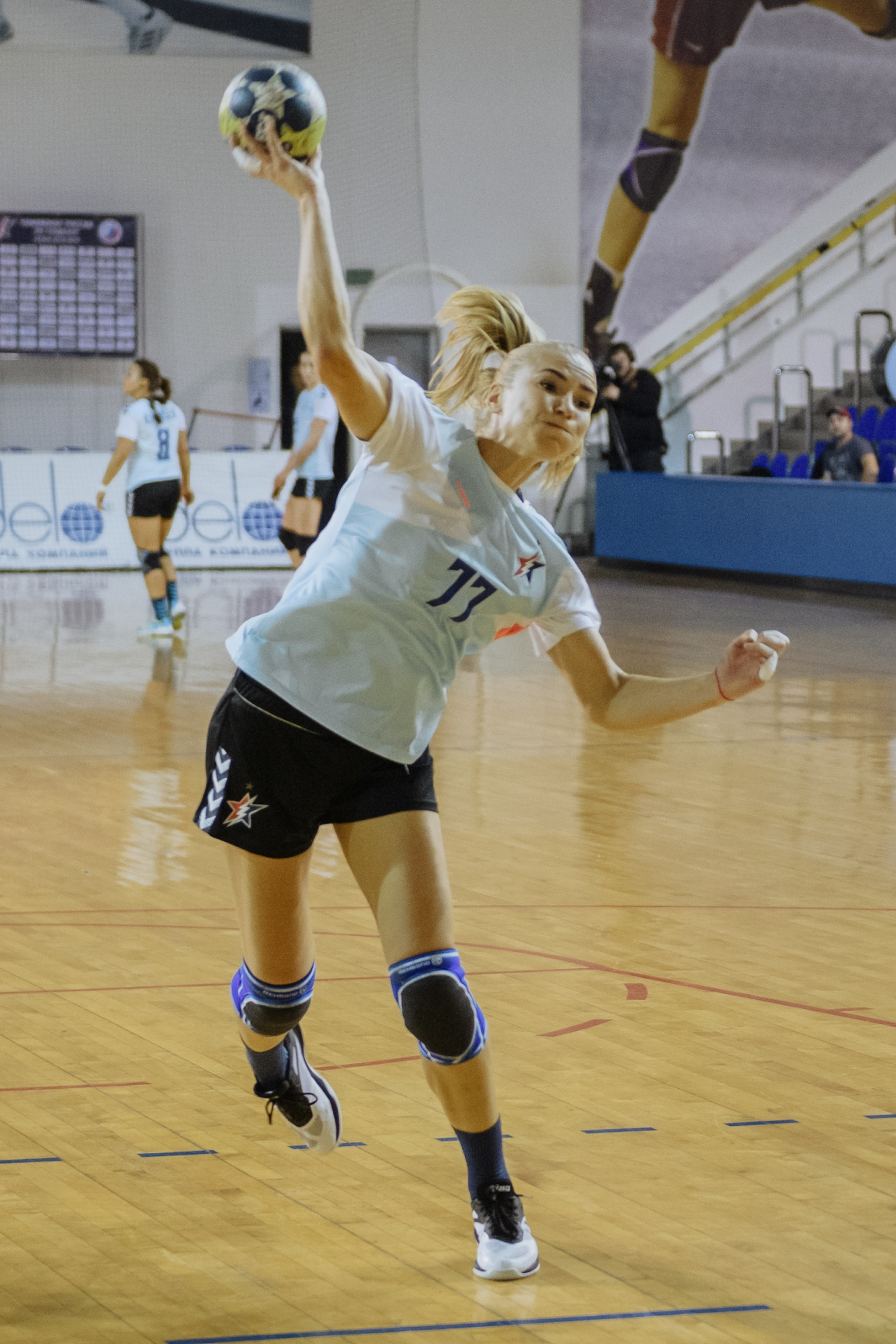
- Irina Nikitina (2018)

Personal information
- Nationality: Russian
- Born: 21 March 1990 (age 36) Tolyatti, Russian SFSR, Soviet Union
- Height: 1.80 m (5 ft 11 in)

Sport
- Sport: Handball
- Position: Centre back
- Current club: HC Lada Togliatti
- Number: 77

Senior clubs
- Years: Team
- 2006–2013: Handball Club Lada
- 2013–2014: ŽRK Budućnost
- 2014–2015: HC Astrakhanochka
- 2015–2016: Siófok KC
- 2017–2019: Zvezda Zvenigorod
- 2019–2020: Rostov-Don
- 2020–2021: HC Astrakhanochka
- 2021–: HC Lada Togliatti
National team
- Years: Team
- –: Russia

Irina Nikitina (born 21 March 1990) is a Russian handball player who plays for HC Lada Togliatti and the Russia national team.

== Club career ==
Nikitina started playing handball aged 10. Between 2004 and 2006 she played for the 3rd and 2nd team of HC Lada Togliatti. In September 2007 she debuted for the 1st team. With them she won the 2008 Russian championship and 2012 EHF Cup.

In 2013 she joined Montenegrin ŽRK Budućnost Podgorica. Here she won the league and cup double and reached the final of the 2013-2014 Champions League in her first season.

She then returned to Russia and joined HC Astrakhanochka. A year later she joined Hungarian Siófok KC. A year later she joined Zvezda Zvenigorod. In 2019 she joined Rostov-Don, where she won the 2020 Russian Championship. She then returned to HC Astrakhanochka.

In 2021 she rejoined HC Lada Togliatti.

=== National team ===
Nikitina played for various Russian youth national team, where she won gold medals at the 2008 U18 World Championship, bronze at the 2009 U19 European Championship and silver at the 2010 U20 World Championship.

She was part of the Russian senior team at the 2018 European Championship, but did not play a single match.

== International honours ==
- EHF Champions League:
  - Finalist: 2014
- EHF Cup:
  - Winner: 2012
