= Wei Baogui =

Chinese handball player (born 1990)

Personal information
- Nationality: Chinese
- Born: 20 March 1990 (age 36)
- Height: 1.79 m (5 ft 10 in)

Sport
- Sport: Handball
- Position: Left back
- Current club: Guangdong
National team
Years	Team	Apps	(Gls)
–	China	30	(15)

Wei Baogui (born 20 March 1990) is a Chinese handball player for Guangdong and the Chinese national team.

She participated at the 2017 World Women's Handball Championship.
