= Carine Babina =

Congolese handball player

Personal information
- Full name: Carine Babina Ngombo
- Nationality: Congolese
- Born: 16 January 1994 (age 32)
- Height: 1.78 m (5 ft 10 in)

Sport
- Sport: Handball
- Position: Right back
- Current club: Mikishi Lubumbashi
National team
- Years: Team
- –: DR Congo

Carine Babina Ngombo (born 16 January 1994) is a Congolese handball player for Mikishi Lubumbashi and the DR Congo national team.

She competed at the 2015 World Women's Handball Championship in Denmark.
