= Kseniya Makeyeva =

Russian handball player

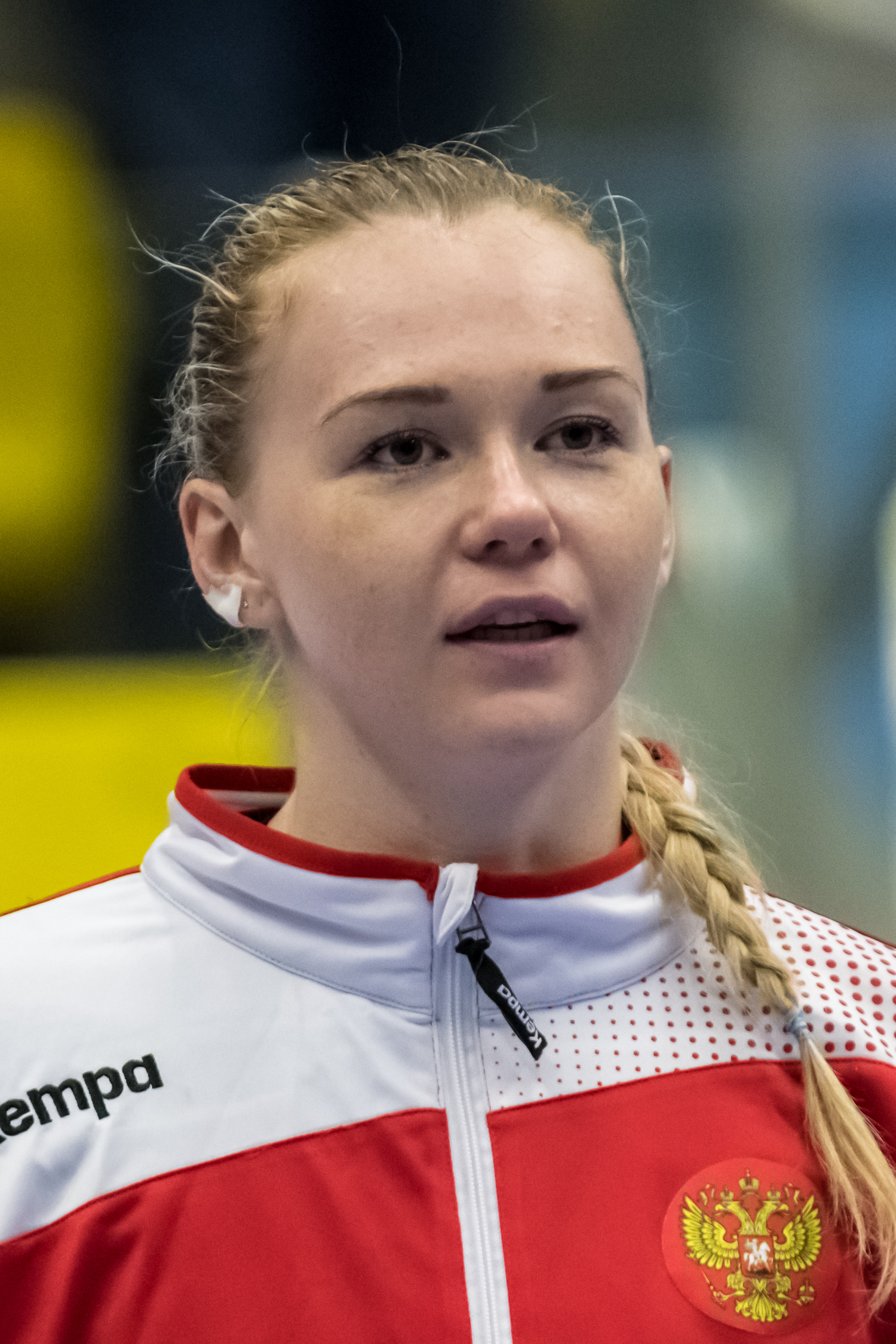
- Makeyeva in 2017

Personal information
- Full name: Kseniya Vladimirovna Makeyeva
- Nationality: Russian
- Born: 19 September 1990 (age 36) Ufa, Soviet Union
- Height: 1.86 m (6 ft 1 in)

Sport
- Sport: Handball
- Position: Pivot
- Current club: Rostov-Don
- Number: 19

Senior clubs
- Years: Team
- 2006–2014: Dinamo Volgograd
- 2014–2015: HCM Baia Mare
- 2015–: Rostov-Don
National team
Years	Team	Apps	(Gls)
2009–	Russia	175	(338)
Medal record
Representing ROC
Olympic Games
Silver medal – second place	2020 Tokyo	Team
Representing Russia
World Championship
Gold medal – first place	2009 China	Team
Bronze medal – third place	2019 Japan	Team
European Championship
Silver medal – second place	2018 France	Team
World Junior Championship
Silver medal – second place	2010 South Korea	Team
World Youth Championship
Gold medal – first place	2008 Slovakia	Team
Summer Universiade
Gold medal – first place	2015 Gwangju	Team
- Updated on 2 November 2021

Kseniya Vladimirovna Makeyeva (Russian: Ксения Владимировна Макеева, IPA: [ˈksʲenʲɪɪ̯ə mɐˈkʲe(ɪ̯)ɪvə]; born 19 September 1990) is a Russian handball player for Rostov-Don and the Russian national team.

== Career ==
Makeyeva started her senior career at Dinamo Volgograd, where she won the Russian championship 6 years in a row from 2009 to 2014. She also won the 2008 EHF European League.

In 2014, she joined Romanian team HCM Baia Mare, where she won the Romanian league, cup and Super Cup treble.

A season later, she returned to Russia and joined Rostov-Don. Here she won the 2017 EHF European League and the 2017, 2018, 2019, 2020, and 2022 Russian championships. In the 2021-22 season, she took a break from handball due to pregnancy.

== Achievements ==
- Romanian Championship:
  - Finalist: 2015
- Romanian Cup:
  - Winner: 2015
- Supercupa României:
  - Winner: 2014
- Russian Championship:
  - Winner: 2009, 2010, 2011, 2012, 2013, 2014, 2017, 2018, 2019, 2020, 2022
  - Bronze Medalist: 2007, 2008
- EHF Cup:
  - Winner: 2008
  - Semifinalist: 2009
- EHF Cup Winners' Cup:
  - Semifinalist: 2012
- World Championship:
  - Gold Medalist: 2009
- Junior World Championship:
  - Silver Medalist: 2010
- Youth World Championship:
  - Gold Medalist: 2008

== Individual awards ==
- All-Star Line Player of the Junior World Championship: 2010
- Medal of the Order "For Merit to the Fatherland", I degree (August 11, 2021)
