= Wiebke Kethorn =

German handball player (born 1985)

Personal information
- Nationality: German
- Born: 10 August 1985 (age 41) Nordhorn, Germany
- Height: 1.68 m (5 ft 6 in)

Sport
- Sport: Handball
- Position: Pivot
- Current club: VfL Oldenburg
- Number: 15
National team
Years	Team	Apps	(Gls)
2009-	Germany	37	(41)

Wiebke Kethorn (born 10 August 1985) is a German team handball player. She plays for the club VfL Oldenburg, and on the German national team. She represented Germany at the 2013 World Women's Handball Championship in Serbia.
