= Jelena Trifunović =

Serbian handball player (born 1991)

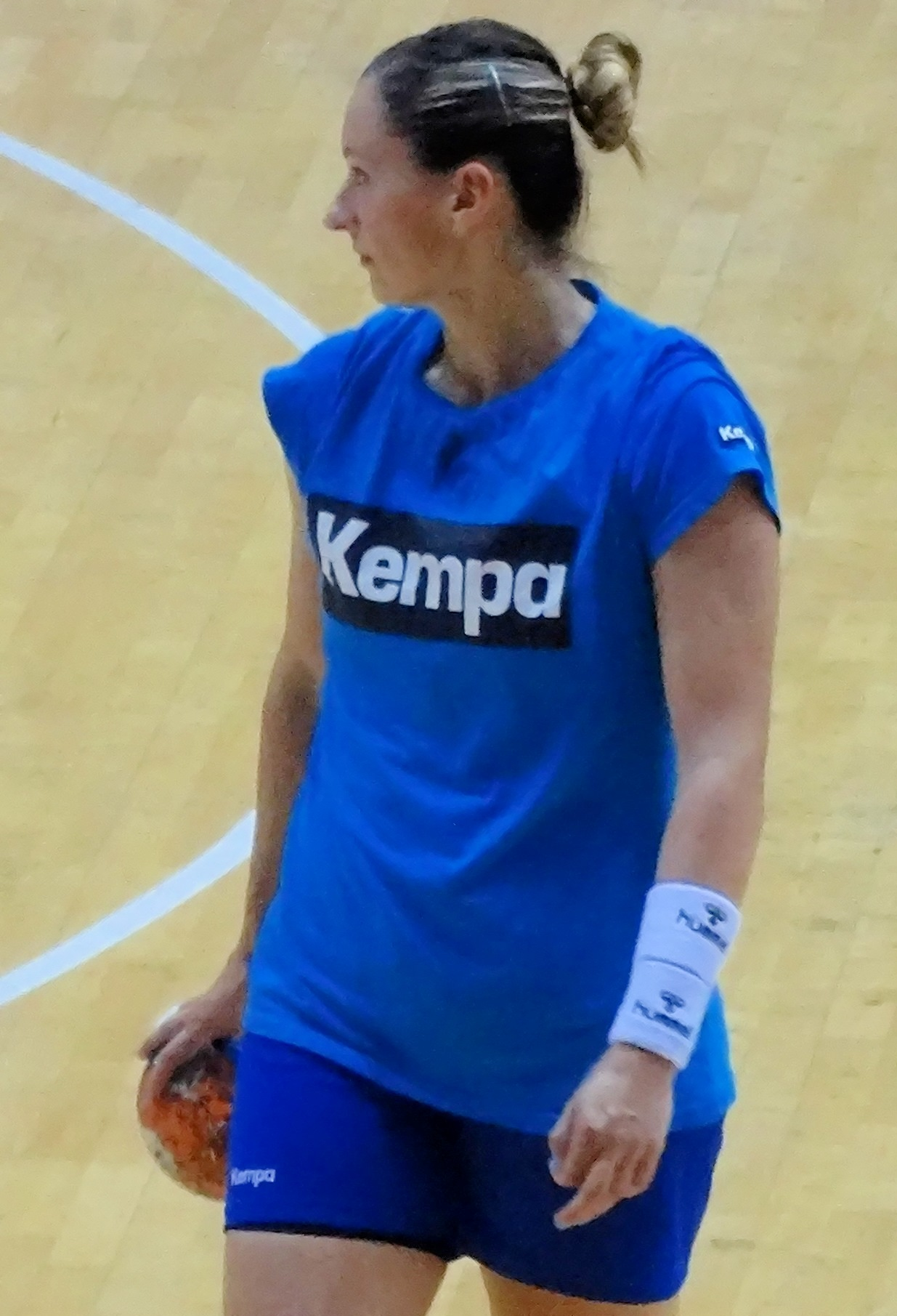

Personal information
- Nationality: Serbian
- Born: 4 August 1991 (age 35) Kraljevo, Serbia
- Height: 1.80 m (5 ft 11 in)

Sport
- Sport: Handball
- Position: Left back

Senior clubs
- Years: Team
- 2008–2011: ORK Vrnjačka Banja
- 2011: ŽRK Metalurg
- 2012: ŽRK Crvena zvezda
- 2012–2013: ŽRK Budućnost
- 2013–2015: RK Podravka Koprivnica
- 2015–2016: Zağnos SK
- 2016–2019: SCM Craiova
- 2019–2021: SCM Râmnicu Vâlcea
- 2021–?: Gloria Bistrița-Năsăud
National team
Years	Team	Apps	(Gls)
–	Serbia	72	(124)
Medal record
Mediterranean Games
Gold medal – first place	2013 Mersin	Team

Jelena Trifunović (Serbian Cyrillic: Јелена Трифуновић; born 4 August 1991) is a Serbian handball player for CS Gloria 2018 Bistrița-Năsăud and the Serbian national team.

In the 2007 Euro Beach Handball Championships, she was the 3rd highest scorer.

She was given the award of Cetățean de onoare ("Honorary Citizen") of the city of Craiova in 2018.

== International honours ==
- EHF Cup:
  - Winner: 2018

== Individual awards ==
- Prosport Best Defender of the Romanian Liga Națională: 2018
