= Ina Großmann =

German handball player (born 1990)

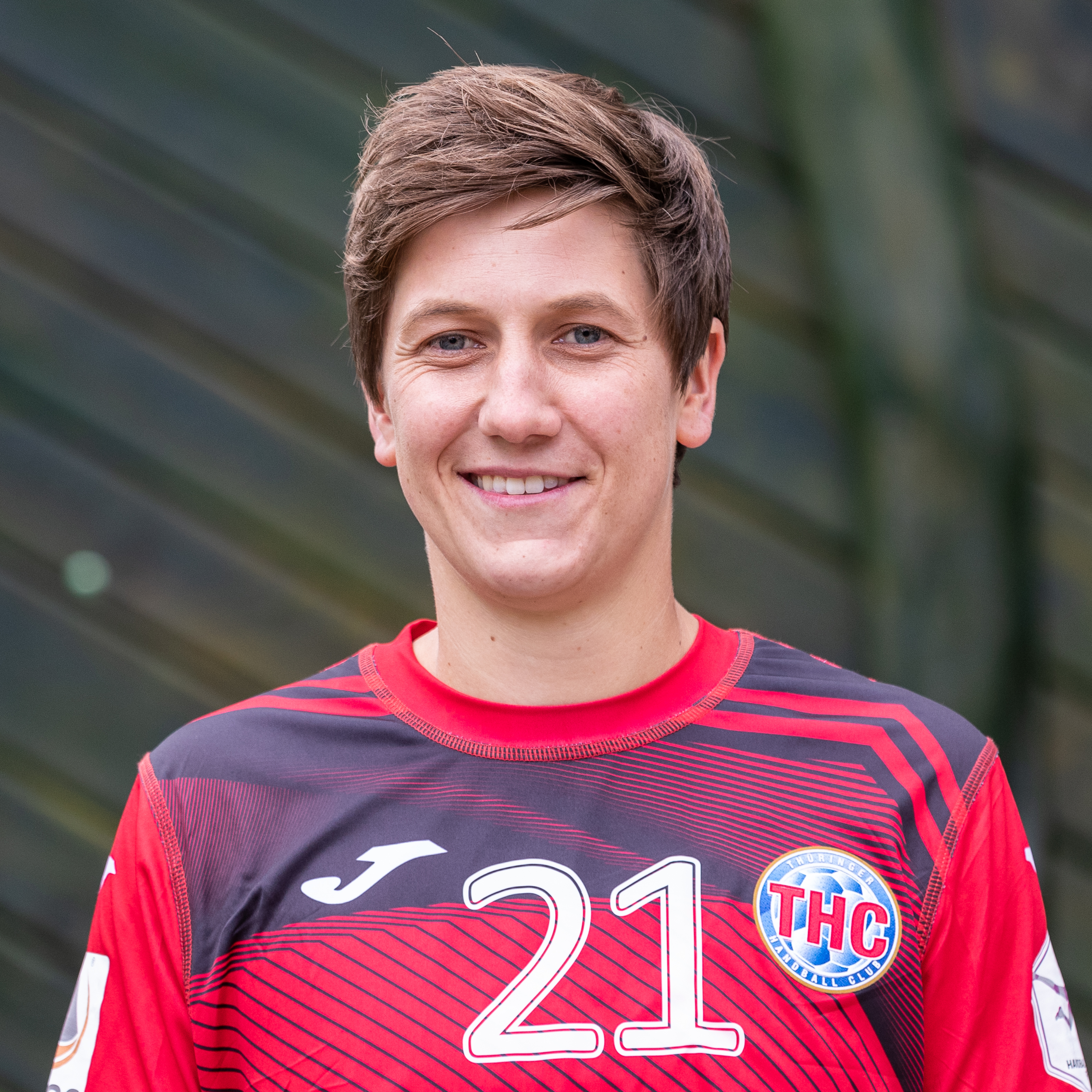
- Großmann in 2020

Personal information
- Nationality: German
- Born: 21 August 1990 (age 36) Holzgerlingen, Germany
- Height: 1.70 m (5 ft 7 in)

Sport
- Sport: Handball
- Position: Left wing
- Current club: Thüringer HC
- Number: 21

Youth career
- Years: Team
- 1996–2008: HSG Schönbuch

Senior clubs
- Years: Team
- 2008–2011: VfL Sindelfingen
- 2010–2018: TuS Metzingen
- 2018–2021: Thüringer HC
National team
Years	Team	Apps	(Gls)
2018–2020	Germany	41	(57)

Ina Großmann (born 21 August 1990) is a German former handball player for Thüringer HC and the German national team.

She participated at the 2018 European Women's Handball Championship.

== International honours ==
- EHF Cup:
  - Finalist: 2016
