= Lee Eun-bi =

South Korean handball player (born 1990)

Lee Eun-Bi
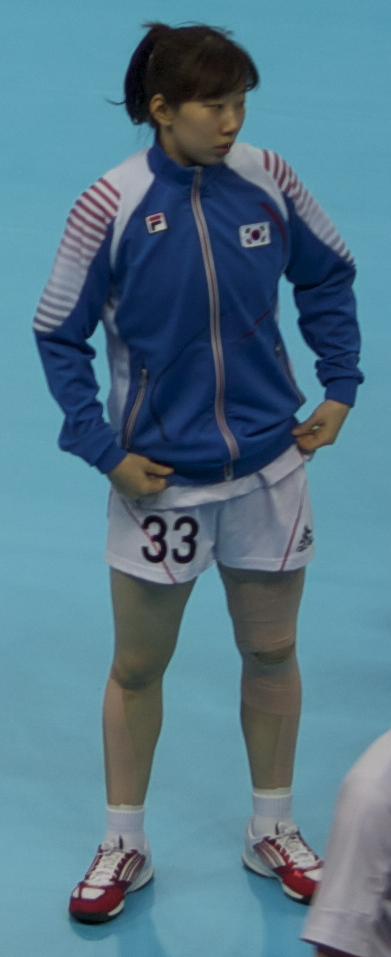

Personal information
- Nationality: South Korean
- Born: 23 October 1990 (age 35)
- Height: 1.63 m (5 ft 4 in)

Sport
- Sport: Handball
- Position: Left wing
- Current club: Busan Infrastructure
National team
Years	Team	Apps	(Gls)
–	South Korea	79	(166)

- Lee Eun-bi
- Hangul: 이은비
- RR: I Eunbi
- MR: I Ŭnbi

Lee Eun-Bi (born 23 October 1990 in Samchok) is a South Korean handball player. She plays on the South Korean national team, and participated at the 2009 World Women's Handball Championship in China, at the 2011 World Women's Handball Championship in Brazil, and at the 2013 World Women's Handball Championship in Serbia.

She played for South Korea at the 2012 Summer Olympics, where South Korea narrowly lost the bronze medal match to Spain 31-29, and the 2016 Summer Olympics.
