= Wafa Cherif =

Tunisian handball goalkeeper

Wafa Cherif (born 6 April 1986) is a Tunisian handball goalkeeper. She plays for the club A.S.F. Sfax and for the Tunisian national team.

She participated at the 2009 World Women's Handball Championship in China, where Tunisia placed 14th.
