= Elhem Gherissi =

Tunisian handball player

Personal information
- Nationality: Tunisian
- Born: 5 July 1991 (age 35)
- Height: 1.68 m (5 ft 6 in)

Sport
- Sport: Handball
- Position: Left wing
- Current club: ASF Mahdia
National team
Years	Team	Apps	(Gls)
–	Tunisia	39	(114)

Elhem Gherissi (born 5 July 1991) is a Tunisian handball player who plays for ASF Mahdia and the Tunisian national team.

She participated in the 2015 World Women's Handball Championship.
