= 2008 Women's Junior World Handball Championship =

Handball tournament in North Macedonia in 2008

2008 Junior World Championship
Tournament details
- Host country: North Macedonia
- Venues: 5 (in 4 host cities)
- Dates: July 21–August 3
- Teams: 20 (from 5 confederations)

Final positions
- Champions: Germany (1st title)
- Runners-up: Denmark
- Third place: South Korea
- Fourth place: Spain

Tournament statistics
- Matches played: 82
- Goals scored: 4,535 (55.3 per match)
- Top scorer: Camilla Dalby (DEN) (65 goals)

Awards
- Best player: Gwon Han-na (KOR)

The 2008 Women's Junior World Handball Championship was the 16th edition of the tournament and took place in North Macedonia from 21 July to 3 August 2008.

Germany won the gold-medal match by defeating Denmark 25-23 while South Korea got the bronze medal.

== Hosting rights and draw ==
North Macedonia won the rights to host the 2008 edition at an IHF congress in April 2007. The draw for the 2008 edition was held on May 18, 2008 at SRC Kale in Skopje with the twenty teams being drawn in four groups of five. Three weeks before the championship began, Uruguay withdrew from the competition and were replaced by Chile.

== Preliminary round ==
=== Group A ===
Pos	Team	Pld	W	D	L	GF	GA	GD	Pts	Qualification
1	Germany	4	3	0	1	125	101	+24	6	Main Round
2	Hungary	4	2	1	1	104	108	−4	5	Main Round
3	Romania	4	2	0	2	113	113	0	4	Main Round
4	Iceland	4	1	2	1	101	104	−3	4	
5	Slovenia	4	0	1	3	96	113	−17	1	

Rules for classification: 1) Points; 2) Head-to-head points; 3) Head-to-head goal difference; 4) Head-to-head goals scored; 5) Goal difference; 6) Goals scored; 7) Draw.

21 July 2008; 18:00	Hungary	23–23	Iceland	SRC Kale, Skopje; Attendance: 50
21 July 2008; 18:00	Kovacsics 10	(10–10)	Sigurdardottir 7	SRC Kale, Skopje; Attendance: 50
21 July 2008; 18:00		Report		SRC Kale, Skopje; Attendance: 50

21 July 2008; 21:00	Slovenia	26–29	Germany	SRC Kale, Skopje; Attendance: 100
21 July 2008; 21:00	Koren, Krhlikar 6	(13–15)	Nadgornaja 5	SRC Kale, Skopje; Attendance: 100
21 July 2008; 21:00		Report		SRC Kale, Skopje; Attendance: 100

22 July 2008; 19:00	Iceland	26–26	Slovenia	SRC Kale, Skopje; Attendance: 100
22 July 2008; 19:00	Stefansdottir 6	(13–10)	Mavsar 6	SRC Kale, Skopje; Attendance: 100
22 July 2008; 19:00		Report		SRC Kale, Skopje; Attendance: 100

22 July 2008; 21:00	Romania	30–38	Germany	SRC Kale, Skopje; Attendance: 200
22 July 2008; 21:00	Tacalie 10	(17–15)	Nadgornaja 10	SRC Kale, Skopje; Attendance: 200
22 July 2008; 21:00		Report		SRC Kale, Skopje; Attendance: 200

23 July 2008; 21:00	Hungary	27–26	Romania	SRC Kale, Skopje; Attendance: 200
23 July 2008; 21:00	Hornyak, Dekai 6	(14–12)	Dinca, Marin 7	SRC Kale, Skopje; Attendance: 200
23 July 2008; 21:00		Report		SRC Kale, Skopje; Attendance: 200

24 July 2008; 19:00	Germany	23–24	Iceland	SRC Kale, Skopje; Attendance: 200
24 July 2008; 19:00	Nadgornaja 6	(13–11)	Stefansdottir 6	SRC Kale, Skopje; Attendance: 200
24 July 2008; 19:00		Report		SRC Kale, Skopje; Attendance: 200

24 July 2008; 21:00	Slovenia	24–33	Hungary	SRC Kale, Skopje; Attendance: 100
24 July 2008; 21:00	Vidic 10	(12–16)	Tamas, Kovacsics 7	SRC Kale, Skopje; Attendance: 100
24 July 2008; 21:00		Report		SRC Kale, Skopje; Attendance: 100

25 July 2008; 21:00	Iceland	28–32	Romania	SRC Kale, Skopje; Attendance: 200
25 July 2008; 21:00	Jonsdottir 7	(13–15)	Marin 8	SRC Kale, Skopje; Attendance: 200
25 July 2008; 21:00		Report		SRC Kale, Skopje; Attendance: 200

26 July 2008; 19:00	Germany	35–21	Hungary	SRC Kale, Skopje; Attendance: 200
26 July 2008; 19:00	Muller 8	(17–12)	Lerant 5	SRC Kale, Skopje; Attendance: 200
26 July 2008; 19:00		Report		SRC Kale, Skopje; Attendance: 200

26 July 2008; 21:00	Romania	25–20	Slovenia	SRC Kale, Skopje; Attendance: 250
26 July 2008; 21:00	Marin 9	(9–11)	Toplak, Varlec, Koren 4	SRC Kale, Skopje; Attendance: 250
26 July 2008; 21:00		Report		SRC Kale, Skopje; Attendance: 250

=== Group B ===
Pos	Team	Pld	W	D	L	GF	GA	GD	Pts	Qualification
1	Denmark	4	3	1	0	128	104	+24	7	Main Round
2	Montenegro	4	3	1	0	121	110	+11	7	Main Round
3	Angola	4	2	0	2	102	99	+3	4	Main Round
4	Japan	4	1	0	3	113	118	−5	2	
5	Kazakhstan	4	0	0	4	89	112	−23	0	

Rules for classification: 1) Points; 2) Head-to-head points; 3) Head-to-head goal difference; 4) Head-to-head goals scored; 5) Goal difference; 6) Goals scored; 7) Draw.

21 July 2008; 18:00	Montenegro	31–23	Angola	SRC "26 April", Gevgelija; Attendance: 100
21 July 2008; 18:00	Miljanic 6	(15–13)	Mungongo 6	SRC "26 April", Gevgelija; Attendance: 100
21 July 2008; 18:00		Report		SRC "26 April", Gevgelija; Attendance: 100

21 July 2008; 21:00	Kazakhstan	27–31	Japan	SRC "26 April", Gevgelija; Attendance: 350
21 July 2008; 21:00	Yerchkova 8	(13–13)	Tarui 6	SRC "26 April", Gevgelija; Attendance: 350
21 July 2008; 21:00		Report		SRC "26 April", Gevgelija; Attendance: 350

22 July 2008; 19:00	Japan	30–31	Montenegro	SRC "26 April", Gevgelija; Attendance: 300
22 July 2008; 19:00	Tarui 9	(16–13)	Toskovic 9	SRC "26 April", Gevgelija; Attendance: 300
22 July 2008; 19:00		Report		SRC "26 April", Gevgelija; Attendance: 300

22 July 2008; 21:00	Denmark	32–25	Angola	SRC "26 April", Gevgelija; Attendance: 600
22 July 2008; 21:00	Dalby 10	(16–17)	Carlos 8	SRC "26 April", Gevgelija; Attendance: 600
22 July 2008; 21:00		Report		SRC "26 April", Gevgelija; Attendance: 600

23 July 2008; 21:00	Kazakhstan	22–33	Denmark	SRC "26 April", Gevgelija; Attendance: 800
23 July 2008; 21:00	Yerchkova 6	(10–16)	Dalby, Kelsa 7	SRC "26 April", Gevgelija; Attendance: 800
23 July 2008; 21:00		Report		SRC "26 April", Gevgelija; Attendance: 800

24 July 2008; 19:00	Angola	26–24	Japan	SRC "26 April", Gevgelija; Attendance: 800
24 July 2008; 19:00	Varela 7	(15–11)	Tarui 10	SRC "26 April", Gevgelija; Attendance: 800
24 July 2008; 19:00		Report		SRC "26 April", Gevgelija; Attendance: 800

24 July 2008; 21:00	Montenegro	30–28	Kazakhstan	SRC "26 April", Gevgelija; Attendance: 900
24 July 2008; 21:00	Milacic, Suzana Lazovic 5	(18–15)	Batyrbekova 7	SRC "26 April", Gevgelija; Attendance: 900
24 July 2008; 21:00		Report		SRC "26 April", Gevgelija; Attendance: 900

25 July 2008; 21:00	Japan	28–34	Denmark	SRC "26 April", Gevgelija; Attendance: 800
25 July 2008; 21:00	Torigai 11	(10–16)	Dalby, Kristiansen 7	SRC "26 April", Gevgelija; Attendance: 800
25 July 2008; 21:00		Report		SRC "26 April", Gevgelija; Attendance: 800

26 July 2008; 19:00	Angola	28–12	Kazakhstan	SRC "26 April", Gevgelija; Attendance: 700
26 July 2008; 19:00	Mungongo 7	(15–6)	Yerchkova, Karamergenova 3	SRC "26 April", Gevgelija; Attendance: 700
26 July 2008; 19:00		Report		SRC "26 April", Gevgelija; Attendance: 700

26 July 2008; 21:00	Denmark	29–29	Montenegro	SRC "26 April", Gevgelija; Attendance: 1500
26 July 2008; 21:00	Dalby 11	(21–15)	Knezevic, Jovovic 6	SRC "26 April", Gevgelija; Attendance: 1500
26 July 2008; 21:00		Report		SRC "26 April", Gevgelija; Attendance: 1500

=== Group C ===
Pos	Team	Pld	W	D	L	GF	GA	GD	Pts	Qualification
1	Croatia	4	3	1	0	149	92	+57	7	Main Round
2	South Korea	4	3	1	0	140	100	+40	7	Main Round
3	Brazil	4	2	0	2	116	107	+9	4	Main Round
4	North Macedonia (H)	4	1	0	3	105	112	−7	2	
5	Australia	4	0	0	4	58	159	−101	0	

Rules for classification: 1) Points; 2) Head-to-head points; 3) Head-to-head goal difference; 4) Head-to-head goals scored; 5) Goal difference; 6) Goals scored; 7) Draw.
(H) Hosts

21 July 2008; 18:00	Croatia	33–25	Brazil	Biljanini Izvori Sports Hall, Ohrid; Attendance: 100
21 July 2008; 18:00	Covic, Pavic 6	(16–11)	Alencar 7	Biljanini Izvori Sports Hall, Ohrid; Attendance: 100
21 July 2008; 18:00		Report		Biljanini Izvori Sports Hall, Ohrid; Attendance: 100

21 July 2008; 21:00	North Macedonia	33–16	Australia	Biljanini Izvori Sports Hall, Ohrid; Attendance: 2100
21 July 2008; 21:00	Petkovska 7	(16–9)	Smiljanic 7	Biljanini Izvori Sports Hall, Ohrid; Attendance: 2100
21 July 2008; 21:00		Report		Biljanini Izvori Sports Hall, Ohrid; Attendance: 2100

22 July 2008; 19:00	Australia	18–53	Croatia	Biljanini Izvori Sports Hall, Ohrid; Attendance: 200
22 July 2008; 19:00	Potocki 7	(8–24)	Grmoja 10	Biljanini Izvori Sports Hall, Ohrid; Attendance: 200
22 July 2008; 19:00		Report		Biljanini Izvori Sports Hall, Ohrid; Attendance: 200

22 July 2008; 21:00	South Korea	37–32	Brazil	Biljanini Izvori Sports Hall, Ohrid; Attendance: 300
22 July 2008; 21:00	Gwon 8	(22–9)	Rocha 8	Biljanini Izvori Sports Hall, Ohrid; Attendance: 300
22 July 2008; 21:00		Report		Biljanini Izvori Sports Hall, Ohrid; Attendance: 300

23 July 2008; 21:00	North Macedonia	27–35	South Korea	Biljanini Izvori Sports Hall, Ohrid; Attendance: 1500
23 July 2008; 21:00	Gorgievska 8	(10–19)	Lee, Choi 7	Biljanini Izvori Sports Hall, Ohrid; Attendance: 1500
23 July 2008; 21:00		Report		Biljanini Izvori Sports Hall, Ohrid; Attendance: 1500

24 July 2008; 19:00	Brazil	34–12	Australia	Biljanini Izvori Sports Hall, Ohrid; Attendance: 300
24 July 2008; 19:00	Franca 12	(18–6)	Potocki 6	Biljanini Izvori Sports Hall, Ohrid; Attendance: 300
24 July 2008; 19:00		Report		Biljanini Izvori Sports Hall, Ohrid; Attendance: 300

24 July 2008; 21:00	Croatia	34–20	North Macedonia	Biljanini Izvori Sports Hall, Ohrid; Attendance: 3000
24 July 2008; 21:00	Niksic 7	(16–6)	Grozdanovska 5	Biljanini Izvori Sports Hall, Ohrid; Attendance: 3000
24 July 2008; 21:00		Report		Biljanini Izvori Sports Hall, Ohrid; Attendance: 3000

25 July 2008; 21:00	Australia	12–39	South Korea	Biljanini Izvori Sports Hall, Ohrid; Attendance: 500
25 July 2008; 21:00	Potocki 5	(7–18)	Jang 9	Biljanini Izvori Sports Hall, Ohrid; Attendance: 500
25 July 2008; 21:00		Report		Biljanini Izvori Sports Hall, Ohrid; Attendance: 500

26 July 2008; 19:00	South Korea	29–29	Croatia	Biljanini Izvori Sports Hall, Ohrid; Attendance: 2000
26 July 2008; 19:00	Gwon 11	(11–15)	Milanovic-Litre 6	Biljanini Izvori Sports Hall, Ohrid; Attendance: 2000
26 July 2008; 19:00		Report		Biljanini Izvori Sports Hall, Ohrid; Attendance: 2000

26 July 2008; 21:00	Brazil	27–25	North Macedonia	Biljanini Izvori Sports Hall, Ohrid; Attendance: 3000
26 July 2008; 21:00	Franca 7	(11–13)	Gorgievska 9	Biljanini Izvori Sports Hall, Ohrid; Attendance: 3000
26 July 2008; 21:00		Report		Biljanini Izvori Sports Hall, Ohrid; Attendance: 3000

=== Group D ===
Pos	Team	Pld	W	D	L	GF	GA	GD	Pts	Qualification
1	France	4	3	1	0	121	77	+44	7	Main Round
2	Spain	4	3	1	0	90	67	+23	7	Main Round
3	Argentina	4	2	0	2	86	90	−4	4	Main Round
4	Chinese Taipei	4	1	0	3	92	109	−17	2	
5	Algeria	4	0	0	4	68	114	−46	0	

Rules for classification: 1) Points; 2) Head-to-head points; 3) Head-to-head goal difference; 4) Head-to-head goals scored; 5) Goal difference; 6) Goals scored; 7) Draw.

21 July 2008; 19:00	France	39–23	Chinese Taipei	Vinica Sports Room, Vinica; Attendance: 1000
21 July 2008; 19:00	Goiorani 9	(21–11)	Yu-Ting 9	Vinica Sports Room, Vinica; Attendance: 1000
21 July 2008; 19:00		Report		Vinica Sports Room, Vinica; Attendance: 1000

21 July 2008; 21:15	Argentina	31–18	Algeria	Vinica Sports Room, Vinica; Attendance: 1500
21 July 2008; 21:15	Pepe 8	(13–13)	Khellil 5	Vinica Sports Room, Vinica; Attendance: 1500
21 July 2008; 21:15		Report		Vinica Sports Room, Vinica; Attendance: 1500

22 July 2008; 19:00	Algeria	18–34	France	Vinica Sports Room, Vinica; Attendance: 500
22 July 2008; 19:00	Khellil 8	(8–15)	Dancette 9	Vinica Sports Room, Vinica; Attendance: 500
22 July 2008; 19:00		Report		Vinica Sports Room, Vinica; Attendance: 500

22 July 2008; 21:00	Spain	27–19	Chinese Taipei	Vinica Sports Room, Vinica; Attendance: 800
22 July 2008; 21:00	Lujan Suarez 6	(14–10)	Yu-Ting 5	Vinica Sports Room, Vinica; Attendance: 800
22 July 2008; 21:00		Report		Vinica Sports Room, Vinica; Attendance: 800

23 July 2008; 21:00	Spain	22–14	Argentina	Vinica Sports Room, Vinica; Attendance: 1500
23 July 2008; 21:00	Canon Garcia 6	(17–9)	Kunshek 3	Vinica Sports Room, Vinica; Attendance: 1500
23 July 2008; 21:00		Report		Vinica Sports Room, Vinica; Attendance: 1500

24 July 2008; 19:00	Chinese Taipei	28–18	Algeria	Vinica Sports Room, Vinica; Attendance: 600
24 July 2008; 19:00	Yu-Ting 10	(14–6)	Ait Ahmed 5	Vinica Sports Room, Vinica; Attendance: 600
24 July 2008; 19:00		Report		Vinica Sports Room, Vinica; Attendance: 600

24 July 2008; 21:00	France	28–16	Argentina	Vinica Sports Room, Vinica; Attendance: 1500
24 July 2008; 21:00	Goiorani 9	(12–9)	Aguirre Tenebaun, Almerares, Kunschek 3	Vinica Sports Room, Vinica; Attendance: 1500
24 July 2008; 21:00		Report		Vinica Sports Room, Vinica; Attendance: 1500

25 July 2008; 21:00	Algeria	14–22	Spain	Vinica Sports Room, Vinica; Attendance: 300
25 July 2008; 21:00	Khellil, Saddiki 3	(8–13)	Lujan Suarez 5	Vinica Sports Room, Vinica; Attendance: 300
25 July 2008; 21:00		Report		Vinica Sports Room, Vinica; Attendance: 300

26 July 2008; 19:00	Chinese Taipei	22–25	Argentina	Vinica Sports Room, Vinica; Attendance: 700
26 July 2008; 19:00	Yu-Ting 7	(9–12)	Mendoza 10	Vinica Sports Room, Vinica; Attendance: 700
26 July 2008; 19:00		Report		Vinica Sports Room, Vinica; Attendance: 700

26 July 2008; 21:00	Spain	20–20	France	Vinica Sports Room, Vinica; Attendance: 1600
26 July 2008; 21:00	Lujan Suarez, Mateo Camacho, Pena Abaurrea 4	(12–10)	Deroin 7	Vinica Sports Room, Vinica; Attendance: 1600
26 July 2008; 21:00		Report		Vinica Sports Room, Vinica; Attendance: 1600

== Main round ==
=== Group I ===
Team	Pld	W	D	L	GF	GA	GD	Pts
Denmark	5	4	1	0	150	125	+25	9
Germany	5	3	0	2	163	135	+28	6
Hungary	5	3	0	2	136	153	–17	6
Montenegro	5	2	1	2	154	149	+5	5
Romania	5	2	0	3	139	149	–10	4
Angola	5	0	0	5	125	156	–31	0

28 July 2008; 17:00	Hungary	31–25	Angola	SRC Kale, Skopje; Attendance: 150
28 July 2008; 17:00	Kovacsics 10	(17–15)	Carlos 8	SRC Kale, Skopje; Attendance: 150
28 July 2008; 17:00		Report		SRC Kale, Skopje; Attendance: 150

28 July 2008; 19:00	Romania	24–30	Denmark	SRC Kale, Skopje; Attendance: 400
28 July 2008; 19:00	Marin 6	(11–14)	Dalby 9	SRC Kale, Skopje; Attendance: 400
28 July 2008; 19:00		Report		SRC Kale, Skopje; Attendance: 400

28 July 2008; 21:00	Germany	29–31	Montenegro	SRC Kale, Skopje; Attendance: 400
28 July 2008; 21:00	Nadgornaja 8	(17–9)	Knezevic 9	SRC Kale, Skopje; Attendance: 400
28 July 2008; 21:00		Report		SRC Kale, Skopje; Attendance: 400

29 July 2008; 17:00	Denmark	34–23	Hungary	SRC Kale, Skopje; Attendance: 100
29 July 2008; 17:00	Augustesen 11	(14–12)	Dravai 5	SRC Kale, Skopje; Attendance: 100
29 July 2008; 17:00		Report		SRC Kale, Skopje; Attendance: 100

29 July 2008; 19:00	Angola	28–37	Germany	SRC Kale, Skopje; Attendance: 250
29 July 2008; 19:00	Quitongo, Varela 7	(10–21)	Garcia-Almendaris 9	SRC Kale, Skopje; Attendance: 250
29 July 2008; 19:00		Report		SRC Kale, Skopje; Attendance: 250

29 July 2008; 21:00	Montenegro	30–34	Romania	SRC Kale, Skopje; Attendance: 500
29 July 2008; 21:00	Stojanovic 8	(14–19)	Tacalie 10	SRC Kale, Skopje; Attendance: 500
29 July 2008; 21:00		Report		SRC Kale, Skopje; Attendance: 500

31 July 2008; 17:00	Romania	25–24	Angola	SRC Kale, Skopje; Attendance: 100
31 July 2008; 17:00	Marin 6	(12–8)	Guialo 6	SRC Kale, Skopje; Attendance: 100
31 July 2008; 17:00		Report		SRC Kale, Skopje; Attendance: 100

31 July 2008; 19:00	Hungary	34–33	Montenegro	SRC Kale, Skopje; Attendance: 300
31 July 2008; 19:00	Tamas 8	(9–16)	Jovovic 11	SRC Kale, Skopje; Attendance: 300
31 July 2008; 19:00		Report		SRC Kale, Skopje; Attendance: 300

31 July 2008; 21:00	Germany	24–25	Denmark	SRC Kale, Skopje; Attendance: 500
31 July 2008; 21:00	Urbannek 8	(14–12)	Dalby 7	SRC Kale, Skopje; Attendance: 500
31 July 2008; 21:00		Report		SRC Kale, Skopje; Attendance: 500

=== Group II ===
Team	Pld	W	D	L	GF	GA	GD	Pts
Spain	5	4	1	0	121	101	+20	9
South Korea	5	3	1	1	170	143	+27	7
Croatia	5	3	1	1	140	125	+15	7
France	5	2	1	2	129	141	–12	5
Brazil	5	1	0	4	138	148	–10	2
Argentina	5	0	0	5	101	141	–40	0

28 July 2008; 17:00	South Korea	36–26	Argentina	Biljanini Izvori Sports Hall, Ohrid; Attendance: 200
28 July 2008; 17:00	Gwon 8	(18–15)	Kunschek 6	Biljanini Izvori Sports Hall, Ohrid; Attendance: 200
28 July 2008; 17:00		Report		Biljanini Izvori Sports Hall, Ohrid; Attendance: 200

28 July 2008; 19:00	Brazil	27–28	France	Biljanini Izvori Sports Hall, Ohrid; Attendance: 200
28 July 2008; 19:00	Oliveira, Franca 5	(12–14)	Goiorani 6	Biljanini Izvori Sports Hall, Ohrid; Attendance: 200
28 July 2008; 19:00		Report		Biljanini Izvori Sports Hall, Ohrid; Attendance: 200

28 July 2008; 21:00	Croatia	20–24	Spain	Biljanini Izvori Sports Hall, Ohrid; Attendance: 500
28 July 2008; 21:00	Covic 6	(9–13)	Berenguer 9	Biljanini Izvori Sports Hall, Ohrid; Attendance: 500
28 July 2008; 21:00		Report		Biljanini Izvori Sports Hall, Ohrid; Attendance: 500

29 July 2008; 17:00	France	28–45	South Korea	Biljanini Izvori Sports Hall, Ohrid; Attendance: 200
29 July 2008; 17:00	Deroin 7	(12–24)	Joo, Choi 12	Biljanini Izvori Sports Hall, Ohrid; Attendance: 200
29 July 2008; 17:00		Report		Biljanini Izvori Sports Hall, Ohrid; Attendance: 200

29 July 2008; 19:00	Argentina	22–25	Croatia	Biljanini Izvori Sports Hall, Ohrid; Attendance: 300
29 July 2008; 19:00	Mendoza 7	(13–14)	Covic, Maruscec 5	Biljanini Izvori Sports Hall, Ohrid; Attendance: 300
29 July 2008; 19:00		Report		Biljanini Izvori Sports Hall, Ohrid; Attendance: 300

29 July 2008; 21:00	Spain	27–24	Brazil	Biljanini Izvori Sports Hall, Ohrid; Attendance: 500
29 July 2008; 21:00	Martin Berenguer 11	(12–14)	Terense 6	Biljanini Izvori Sports Hall, Ohrid; Attendance: 500
29 July 2008; 21:00		Report		Biljanini Izvori Sports Hall, Ohrid; Attendance: 500

31 July 2008; 17:00	Brazil	30–23	Argentina	Biljanini Izvori Sports Hall, Ohrid; Attendance: 200
31 July 2008; 17:00	Franca 9	(12–12)	Mendoza 6	Biljanini Izvori Sports Hall, Ohrid; Attendance: 200
31 July 2008; 17:00		Report		Biljanini Izvori Sports Hall, Ohrid; Attendance: 200

31 July 2008; 19:00	South Korea	23–28	Spain	Biljanini Izvori Sports Hall, Ohrid; Attendance: 300
31 July 2008; 19:00	Kyungjin 7	(9–16)	Lujan Suarez 9	Biljanini Izvori Sports Hall, Ohrid; Attendance: 300
31 July 2008; 19:00		Report		Biljanini Izvori Sports Hall, Ohrid; Attendance: 300

31 July 2008; 21:00	Croatia	33–25	France	Biljanini Izvori Sports Hall, Ohrid; Attendance: 500
31 July 2008; 21:00	Milic 7	(18–13)	Deroin 8	Biljanini Izvori Sports Hall, Ohrid; Attendance: 500
31 July 2008; 21:00		Report		Biljanini Izvori Sports Hall, Ohrid; Attendance: 500

== Placement round ==
=== Group I ===
Team	Pld	W	D	L	GF	GA	GD	Pts
Iceland	3	3	0	0	114	87	+27	6
Algeria	3	1	1	1	83	86	–3	3
North Macedonia	3	1	1	1	79	90	–11	3
Kazakhstan	3	0	0	3	82	95	–13	0

28 July 2008; 19:00	Iceland	39–31	Kazakhstan	SRC "26 April", Gevgelija; Attendance: 500
28 July 2008; 19:00	Stefansdottir, Jonsdottir 7	(21–12)	Goncharova 7	SRC "26 April", Gevgelija; Attendance: 500
28 July 2008; 19:00		Report		SRC "26 April", Gevgelija; Attendance: 500

28 July 2008; 21:00	North Macedonia	25–25	Algeria	SRC "26 April", Gevgelija; Attendance: 1500
28 July 2008; 21:00	Gorgievska 11	(12–17)	Khelli, Khellil 6	SRC "26 April", Gevgelija; Attendance: 1500
28 July 2008; 21:00		Report		SRC "26 April", Gevgelija; Attendance: 1500

29 July 2008; 19:00	Algeria	29–36	Iceland	SRC "26 April", Gevgelija; Attendance: 1000
29 July 2008; 19:00	Ait Ahmed 10	(16–19)	Knutsdottir 8	SRC "26 April", Gevgelija; Attendance: 1000
29 July 2008; 19:00		Report		SRC "26 April", Gevgelija; Attendance: 1000

29 July 2008; 21:00	Kazakhstan	26–27	North Macedonia	SRC "26 April", Gevgelija; Attendance: 1500
29 July 2008; 21:00	Goncharova, Yerchkova 6	(13–12)	Sterjova 8	SRC "26 April", Gevgelija; Attendance: 1500
29 July 2008; 21:00		Report		SRC "26 April", Gevgelija; Attendance: 1500

31 July 2008; 19:00	Kazakhstan	25–29	Algeria	SRC "26 April", Gevgelija; Attendance: 500
31 July 2008; 19:00	Karamergenova 6	(11–16)	Ait Ahmed 10	SRC "26 April", Gevgelija; Attendance: 500
31 July 2008; 19:00		Report		SRC "26 April", Gevgelija; Attendance: 500

31 July 2008; 21:00	Iceland	39–27	North Macedonia	SRC "26 April", Gevgelija; Attendance: 1500
31 July 2008; 21:00	Knutsdottir 9	(20–12)	Grozdanovska 6	SRC "26 April", Gevgelija; Attendance: 1500
31 July 2008; 21:00		Report		SRC "26 April", Gevgelija; Attendance: 1500

=== Group II ===
Team	Pld	W	D	L	GF	GA	GD	Pts
Japan	3	3	0	0	98	77	+21	6
Slovenia	3	2	0	1	109	71	+38	4
Chinese Taipei	3	1	0	2	75	91	–16	2
Australia	3	0	0	3	61	104	–43	0

28 July 2008; 19:00	Japan	35–31	Slovenia	Vinica Sports Hall, Vincia; Attendance: 500
28 July 2008; 19:00	Ishino 8	(15–12)	Mavsar 8	Vinica Sports Hall, Vincia; Attendance: 500
28 July 2008; 19:00		Report		Vinica Sports Hall, Vincia; Attendance: 500

28 July 2008; 21:00	Chinese Taipei	29–25	Australia	Vinica Sports Hall, Vincia; Attendance: 700
28 July 2008; 21:00	Tzu-Han 10	(11–10)	Potocki 14	Vinica Sports Hall, Vincia; Attendance: 700
28 July 2008; 21:00		Report		Vinica Sports Hall, Vincia; Attendance: 700

29 July 2008; 19:00	Australia	22–33	Japan	Vinica Sports Hall, Vincia; Attendance: 400
29 July 2008; 19:00	Potocki 11	(10–16)	Matsumoto 9	Vinica Sports Hall, Vincia; Attendance: 400
29 July 2008; 19:00		Report		Vinica Sports Hall, Vincia; Attendance: 400

29 July 2008; 21:00	Slovenia	36–22	Chinese Taipei	Vinica Sports Hall, Vincia; Attendance: 600
29 July 2008; 21:00	Mavsar 7	(16–7)	Yu-Ting, Yi-Chi 5	Vinica Sports Hall, Vincia; Attendance: 600
29 July 2008; 21:00		Report		Vinica Sports Hall, Vincia; Attendance: 600

31 July 2008; 19:00	Japan	30–24	Chinese Taipei	Vinica Sports Hall, Vincia
31 July 2008; 19:00	Yasojima 6	(17–8)	Yu-Ting 11	Vinica Sports Hall, Vincia
31 July 2008; 19:00		Report		Vinica Sports Hall, Vincia

31 July 2008; 21:00	Slovenia	42–14	Australia	Vinica Sports Hall, Vincia; Attendance: 300
31 July 2008; 21:00	Vidic 8	(24–6)	Potocki, Smiljanic 5	Vinica Sports Hall, Vincia; Attendance: 300
31 July 2008; 21:00		Report		Vinica Sports Hall, Vincia; Attendance: 300

== Placement matches ==
=== 19th/20th ===
2 August 2008; 09:30	Australia	22–32	Kazakhstan	SRC Kale, Skopje; Attendance: 100
2 August 2008; 09:30	Potocki 9	(13–15)	Yerchkova 7	SRC Kale, Skopje; Attendance: 100
2 August 2008; 09:30		Report		SRC Kale, Skopje; Attendance: 100

=== 17th/18th ===
2 August 2008; 11:15	North Macedonia	25–26	Chinese Taipei	SRC Kale, Skopje; Attendance: 300
2 August 2008; 11:15	Sterjova, Gorgievska 5	(15–12)	Yu-Ting 10	SRC Kale, Skopje; Attendance: 300
2 August 2008; 11:15		Report		SRC Kale, Skopje; Attendance: 300

=== 15th/16th ===
2 August 2008; 13:30	Slovenia	33–27	Algeria	SRC Kale, Skopje; Attendance: 100
2 August 2008; 13:30	Vidic 7	(17–12)	Khelli, Ait Ahmed 7	SRC Kale, Skopje; Attendance: 100
2 August 2008; 13:30		Report		SRC Kale, Skopje; Attendance: 100

=== 13th/14th ===
2 August 2008; 16:00	Iceland	27–26	Japan	SRC Kale, Skopje; Attendance: 65
2 August 2008; 16:00	Stefansdottir 7	(15–12)	Tarui 8	SRC Kale, Skopje; Attendance: 65
2 August 2008; 16:00		Report		SRC Kale, Skopje; Attendance: 65

=== 11th/12th ===
3 August 2008; 09:30	Argentina	24–29	Angola	SRC Kale, Skopje; Attendance: 40
3 August 2008; 09:30	Roses 8	(13–13)	Mungongo 8	SRC Kale, Skopje; Attendance: 40
3 August 2008; 09:30		Report		SRC Kale, Skopje; Attendance: 40

=== 9th/10th ===
3 August 2008; 16:00	Romania	31–33	Brazil	SRC Kale, Skopje; Attendance: 50
3 August 2008; 16:00	Marin 8	(12–16)	Alencar 9	SRC Kale, Skopje; Attendance: 50
3 August 2008; 16:00		Report		SRC Kale, Skopje; Attendance: 50

=== 7th/8th ===
3 August 2008; 11:15	France	42–35	Montenegro	SRC Kale, Skopje; Attendance: 200
3 August 2008; 11:15	Deroin 10	(17–14)	Stojanovic 7	SRC Kale, Skopje; Attendance: 200
3 August 2008; 11:15		Report		SRC Kale, Skopje; Attendance: 200

=== 5th/6th ===
3 August 2008; 13:30	Hungary	28–24	Croatia	SRC Kale, Skopje; Attendance: 200
3 August 2008; 13:30	Szolosi 7	(12–15)	Covic 8	SRC Kale, Skopje; Attendance: 200
3 August 2008; 13:30		Report		SRC Kale, Skopje; Attendance: 200

== Final round ==
Semi-finals
2 August
Denmark	32
South Korea	28
2 August
Spain	22
Germany	28

Final
3 August
Denmark	23
Germany	25
Third place
3 August
South Korea	29
Spain	22

=== Semi-finals ===
2 August 2008; 18:30	Denmark	32–28	South Korea	Boris Trajkovski Sports Center, Skopje; Attendance: 1,000
2 August 2008; 18:30	Augustesen 10	(16–14)	Gwong 8	Boris Trajkovski Sports Center, Skopje; Attendance: 1,000
2 August 2008; 18:30		Report		Boris Trajkovski Sports Center, Skopje; Attendance: 1,000

2 August 2008; 21:00	Spain	22–28	Germany	Boris Trajkovski Sports Center, Skopje; Attendance: 1,000
2 August 2008; 21:00	Berenguer 7	(12–12)	Garcia-Almendaris 8	Boris Trajkovski Sports Center, Skopje; Attendance: 1,000
2 August 2008; 21:00		Report		Boris Trajkovski Sports Center, Skopje; Attendance: 1,000

=== Third-place game ===
3 August 2008; 17:30	South Korea	29–22	Spain	Boris Trajkovski Sports Center, Skopje; Attendance: 1,000
3 August 2008; 17:30	Choe, Lee 6	(14–8)	Berenguer 8	Boris Trajkovski Sports Center, Skopje; Attendance: 1,000
3 August 2008; 17:30		Report		Boris Trajkovski Sports Center, Skopje; Attendance: 1,000

=== Final ===
3 August 2008; 20:00	Denmark	23–25	Germany	Boris Trajkovski Sports Center, Skopje; Attendance: 2,500
3 August 2008; 20:00	Thorsgard 6	(13–13)	Muller 7	Boris Trajkovski Sports Center, Skopje; Attendance: 2,500
3 August 2008; 20:00		Report		Boris Trajkovski Sports Center, Skopje; Attendance: 2,500

== Ranking and awards ==
=== Final ranking ===
Rank	Team
Gold medal	Germany
Silver medal	Denmark
Bronze medal	South Korea
4	Spain
5	Hungary
6	Croatia
7	France
8	Montenegro
9	Brazil
10	Romania
11	Angola
12	Argentina
13	Iceland
14	Japan
15	Slovenia
16	Algeria
17	Chinese Taipei
18	North Macedonia
19	Kazakhstan
20	Australia

=== All Star Team ===
- Goalkeeper: Sandra Toft (DEN)
- Left wing: Elisabeth Garcia-Almendaris (GER)
- Left back: Nadja Nadgornaja (GER)
- Pivot: Gwon Han-na (KOR)
- Centre back: Camilla Dalby (DNK)
- Right back: Carmen Martín (ESP)
- Right wing: Sandra Bosnjak (CRO)

Chosen by team officials and IHF experts

=== Other awards ===
- Most Valuable Player: Gwon Han-na (KOR)
- Top Goalscorer: Camilla Dalby (DEN) 65 goals
