= 2018 Pan American Women's Junior Handball Championship =

Tournament details
- Host country: Brazil
- Venue: 1 (in 1 host city)
- Dates: 21–25 March
- Teams: 6 (from 2 confederations)

Final positions
- Champions: Brazil (9th title)
- Runners-up: Chile
- Third place: Paraguay
- Fourth place: Argentina

Tournament statistics
- Matches played: 15
- Goals scored: 792 (52.8 per match)
- Top scorers: Eduarda dos Santos (BRA) (36 goals)

The 2018 Pan American Women's Junior Handball Championship was the 12th edition of the tournament, Took place in the city of Goiânia, Brazil at the Goiânia Arena from 21 to 25 March 2018. It acts as the American qualifying tournament for the 2018 Women's Junior World Handball Championship.

== Results ==
Pos	Team	Pld	W	D	L	GF	GA	GD	Pts
1	Brazil (H)	5	5	0	0	154	88	+66	10
2	Chile	5	3	0	2	142	121	+21	6 (Note: Chile 2 Pts, +2 GD, 56 GS; Paraguay 2 Pts, +2 GD, 53 GS; Argentina 2 Pts, –4GD.)
3	Paraguay	5	3	0	2	152	132	+20	6
4	Argentina	5	3	0	2	139	117	+22	6
5	Uruguay	5	1	0	4	115	131	−16	2
6	Dominican Republic	5	0	0	5	90	203	−113	0

Source: brasilhandebol.com.br
Rules for classification: 1) Points; 2) Head-to-head points; 3) Head-to-head goal difference; 4) Head-to-head goals scored; 5) Goal difference; 6) Goals scored; 7) Draw.
(H) Hosts
Notes:

All times are local (UTC−03:00).

21 March 2018; 14:00	Chile	33–20	Uruguay	Goiânia Arena, Goiânia; Attendance: 100; Referees: Paolantoni, Zanikian (ARG)
21 March 2018; 14:00	Gomez, Lovera 6	(18–11)	Dondan, Petito 5	Goiânia Arena, Goiânia; Attendance: 100; Referees: Paolantoni, Zanikian (ARG)
21 March 2018; 14:00	3× (yellow card) 4× (suspension)	Report	1× (yellow card) 5× (suspension)	Goiânia Arena, Goiânia; Attendance: 100; Referees: Paolantoni, Zanikian (ARG)

21 March 2018; 16:30	Argentina	38–19	Dominican Republic	Goiânia Arena, Goiânia; Attendance: 120; Referees: Moraga, Zavalla (CHI)
21 March 2018; 16:30	Manzano, Battaglia 6	(15–8)	Novas 11	Goiânia Arena, Goiânia; Attendance: 120; Referees: Moraga, Zavalla (CHI)
21 March 2018; 16:30	2× (yellow card) 2× (suspension)	Report	1× (yellow card) 8× (suspension)	Goiânia Arena, Goiânia; Attendance: 120; Referees: Moraga, Zavalla (CHI)

21 March 2018; 20:00	Brazil	30–22	Paraguay	Goiânia Arena, Goiânia; Attendance: 350; Referees: Sosa, Lemes (URU)
21 March 2018; 20:00	Santos, Mendez 6	(12–12)	Leiva 8	Goiânia Arena, Goiânia; Attendance: 350; Referees: Sosa, Lemes (URU)
21 March 2018; 20:00	1× (yellow card) 4× (suspension)	Report	1× (yellow card) 6× (suspension)	Goiânia Arena, Goiânia; Attendance: 350; Referees: Sosa, Lemes (URU)

22 March 2018; 14:30	Dominican Republic	19–39	Chile	Goiânia Arena, Goiânia; Attendance: 105; Referees: Vilela, Oliveira (BRA)
22 March 2018; 14:30	Novas 9	(10–16)	Gomez 7	Goiânia Arena, Goiânia; Attendance: 105; Referees: Vilela, Oliveira (BRA)
22 March 2018; 14:30	3× (yellow card) 6× (suspension)	Report	2× (yellow card)	Goiânia Arena, Goiânia; Attendance: 105; Referees: Vilela, Oliveira (BRA)

22 March 2018; 17:00	Paraguay	25–26	Argentina	Goiânia Arena, Goiânia; Referees: Sosa, Lemes (URU)
22 March 2018; 17:00	Acuña, Insfrán 5	(11–8)	Pedernera 7	Goiânia Arena, Goiânia; Referees: Sosa, Lemes (URU)
22 March 2018; 17:00	2× (yellow card) 6× (suspension)	Report	2× (yellow card) 3× (suspension)	Goiânia Arena, Goiânia; Referees: Sosa, Lemes (URU)

22 March 2018; 19:30	Uruguay	15–26	Brazil	Goiânia Arena, Goiânia; Attendance: 250; Referees: Moraga, Zavalla (CHI)
22 March 2018; 19:30	Grieco, Dondan 4	(7–14)	four players 5	Goiânia Arena, Goiânia; Attendance: 250; Referees: Moraga, Zavalla (CHI)
22 March 2018; 19:30	2× (yellow card) 5× (suspension)	Report	2× (suspension)	Goiânia Arena, Goiânia; Attendance: 250; Referees: Moraga, Zavalla (CHI)

23 March 2018; 14:30	Argentina	26–31	Chile	Goiânia Arena, Goiânia; Attendance: 120; Referees: Sosa, Lemes (URU)
23 March 2018; 14:30	Martinez 6	(14–17)	Lovera 9	Goiânia Arena, Goiânia; Attendance: 120; Referees: Sosa, Lemes (URU)
23 March 2018; 14:30	1× (yellow card) 2× (suspension)	Report	3× (suspension)	Goiânia Arena, Goiânia; Attendance: 120; Referees: Sosa, Lemes (URU)

23 March 2018; 17:00	Paraguay	32–27	Uruguay	Goiânia Arena, Goiânia; Attendance: 200; Referees: Paoloantoni, Zanikian (ARG)
23 March 2018; 17:00	Acuña 12	(18–17)	Dondan 9	Goiânia Arena, Goiânia; Attendance: 200; Referees: Paoloantoni, Zanikian (ARG)
23 March 2018; 17:00	1× (yellow card) 3× (suspension)	Report	5× (suspension)	Goiânia Arena, Goiânia; Attendance: 200; Referees: Paoloantoni, Zanikian (ARG)

23 March 2018; 19:30	Brazil	42–13	Dominican Republic	Goiânia Arena, Goiânia; Attendance: 420; Referees: Moraga, Zavalla (CHI)
23 March 2018; 19:30	Santos 9	(18–6)	Lirazno 7	Goiânia Arena, Goiânia; Attendance: 420; Referees: Moraga, Zavalla (CHI)
23 March 2018; 19:30	1× (yellow card) 3× (suspension)	Report	1× (yellow card) 13× (suspension) 1× (red card)	Goiânia Arena, Goiânia; Attendance: 420; Referees: Moraga, Zavalla (CHI)

24 March 2018; 13:00	Argentina	25–14	Uruguay	Goiânia Arena, Goiânia; Attendance: 120; Referees: Moraga, Zavalla (CHI)
24 March 2018; 13:00	Manzano 6	(14–5)	Dondan, Petito 3	Goiânia Arena, Goiânia; Attendance: 120; Referees: Moraga, Zavalla (CHI)
24 March 2018; 13:00	2× (yellow card)	Report	3× (yellow card) 3× (suspension)	Goiânia Arena, Goiânia; Attendance: 120; Referees: Moraga, Zavalla (CHI)

24 March 2018; 15:00	Dominican Republic	24–45	Paraguay	Goiânia Arena, Goiânia; Attendance: 180; Referees: Souza, Vilela (BRA)
24 March 2018; 15:00	Liranzo 9	(15–20)	Insfrán 7	Goiânia Arena, Goiânia; Attendance: 180; Referees: Souza, Vilela (BRA)
24 March 2018; 15:00	1× (yellow card) 4× (suspension) 1× (red card)	Report	1× (yellow card)	Goiânia Arena, Goiânia; Attendance: 180; Referees: Souza, Vilela (BRA)

24 March 2018; 17:00	Chile	14–28	Brazil	Goiânia Arena, Goiânia; Attendance: 500; Referees: Sosa, Lemes (URU)
24 March 2018; 17:00	Baumann, Lovera 3	(7–9)	Santos 10	Goiânia Arena, Goiânia; Attendance: 500; Referees: Sosa, Lemes (URU)
24 March 2018; 17:00	1× (yellow card)	Report	2× (yellow card) 3× (suspension)	Goiânia Arena, Goiânia; Attendance: 500; Referees: Sosa, Lemes (URU)

25 March 2018; 11:00	Uruguay	39–15	Dominican Republic	Goiânia Arena, Goiânia; Attendance: 120; Referees: Souza, Vilela (BRA)
25 March 2018; 11:00	Dondan 10	(15–6)	Liranzo 6	Goiânia Arena, Goiânia; Attendance: 120; Referees: Souza, Vilela (BRA)
25 March 2018; 11:00	2× (suspension)	Report	1× (yellow card) 4× (suspension) 1× (red card)	Goiânia Arena, Goiânia; Attendance: 120; Referees: Souza, Vilela (BRA)

25 March 2018; 13:00	Chile	25–28	Paraguay	Goiânia Arena, Goiânia; Referees: Paolantoni, Zanikian (ARG)
25 March 2018; 13:00	Lovera 10	(11–13)	Acuña 8	Goiânia Arena, Goiânia; Referees: Paolantoni, Zanikian (ARG)
25 March 2018; 13:00	2× (yellow card) 3× (suspension)	Report	1× (yellow card) 9× (suspension)	Goiânia Arena, Goiânia; Referees: Paolantoni, Zanikian (ARG)

25 March 2018; 15:00	Brazil	28–24	Argentina	Goiânia Arena, Goiânia; Attendance: 2000; Referees: Sosa, Lemes (URU)
25 March 2018; 15:00	Santos 6	(17–10)	Cavo 8	Goiânia Arena, Goiânia; Attendance: 2000; Referees: Sosa, Lemes (URU)
25 March 2018; 15:00	1× (yellow card) 6× (suspension)	Report	1× (suspension)	Goiânia Arena, Goiânia; Attendance: 2000; Referees: Sosa, Lemes (URU)

== Final standing ==
Rank	Team
Gold medal	Brazil
Silver medal	Chile
Bronze medal	Paraguay
4	Argentina
5	Uruguay
6	Dominican Republic

Team qualified to the 2018 Women's Junior World Handball Championship
