= 2026 South and Central American Women's Junior Handball Championship =

Tournament details
- Host country: Paraguay
- Venue: 1 (in 1 host city)
- Dates: 12–16 January
- Teams: 8 (from 1 confederation)

Final positions
- Champions: Brazil (1st title)
- Runners-up: Argentina
- Third place: Paraguay
- Fourth place: Uruguay

Tournament statistics
- Matches played: 20
- Goals scored: 1,046 (52.3 per match)
- Top scorers: (Paraguay) Fiorella Enríquez (38 goals)

The 2026 South and Central American Women's Junior Handball Championship took place in Asunción, Paraguay, from 12 to 16 January 2026. It acted as the South and Central American qualifying tournament for the 2026 IHF Women's U20 Handball World Championship.

== Qualification ==
Competition	Dates	Host	Vacancies	Qualified
Automatic qualifiers			5	Argentina; Brazil; Chile; Paraguay; Uruguay
IHF Trophy South and Central America – Central American Zone	20–24 May 2025	(Honduras) Tegucigalpa	2	El Salvador; Guatemala
IHF Trophy South and Central America – South America Zone	23–27 July 2025	(Peru) Lima	~~2~~ 1	Colombia; ~~Venezuela~~

== Preliminary round ==
All times are local (UTC–3).

=== Group A ===
Pos	Team	Pld	W	D	L	GF	GA	GD	Pts	Qualification
1	Argentina	3	3	0	0	118	51	+67	6	Semifinals
2	Uruguay	3	2	0	1	92	54	+38	4	Semifinals
3	Colombia	3	1	0	2	77	93	−16	2	5–8th place semifinals
4	El Salvador	3	0	0	3	46	135	−89	0	5–8th place semifinals

Source: SCAHC
Rules for classification: 1) Points; 2) Head-to-head points; 3) Head-to-head goal difference; 4) Head-to-head goals scored; 5) Goal difference; 6) Goals scored; 7) Draw.

12 January 2026; 14:00	Uruguay	47–10	El Salvador	SND Arena, Asunción
12 January 2026; 14:00		(23–5)		SND Arena, Asunción
12 January 2026; 14:00		Report		SND Arena, Asunción

12 January 2026; 18:00	Argentina	45–18	Colombia	SND Arena, Asunción; Referees: Sosa, Solís
12 January 2026; 18:00	Losarcos 8	(23–8)	Arroyave 5	SND Arena, Asunción; Referees: Sosa, Solís
12 January 2026; 18:00	3× (suspension)	Report	5× (suspension)	SND Arena, Asunción; Referees: Sosa, Solís

13 January 2026; 16:00	Colombia	19–26	Uruguay	SND Arena, Asunción
13 January 2026; 16:00		(11–12)		SND Arena, Asunción
13 January 2026; 16:00		Report		SND Arena, Asunción

13 January 2026; 18:00	El Salvador	14–48	Argentina	SND Arena, Asunción; Attendance: 70; Referees: Sosa, Solís
13 January 2026; 18:00	Hernández 4	(6–21)	Genoud 9	SND Arena, Asunción; Attendance: 70; Referees: Sosa, Solís
13 January 2026; 18:00	1× (suspension)	Report	2× (suspension)	SND Arena, Asunción; Attendance: 70; Referees: Sosa, Solís

14 January 2026; 14:00	Colombia	40–22	El Salvador	SND Arena, Asunción; Attendance: 20
14 January 2026; 14:00		(18–10)		SND Arena, Asunción; Attendance: 20
14 January 2026; 14:00		Report		SND Arena, Asunción; Attendance: 20

14 January 2026; 18:00	Argentina	25–19	Uruguay	SND Arena, Asunción; Attendance: 100; Referees: Corrêa, Corrêa (BRA)
14 January 2026; 18:00	Molina 6	(11–9)	Villalba 5	SND Arena, Asunción; Attendance: 100; Referees: Corrêa, Corrêa (BRA)
14 January 2026; 18:00	1× (yellow card) 1× (suspension)	Report	1× (yellow card) 1× (suspension)	SND Arena, Asunción; Attendance: 100; Referees: Corrêa, Corrêa (BRA)

=== Group B ===
Pos	Team	Pld	W	D	L	GF	GA	GD	Pts	Qualification
1	Brazil	3	3	0	0	101	50	+51	6	Semifinals
2	Paraguay (H)	3	2	0	1	91	86	+5	4	Semifinals
3	Chile	3	1	0	2	75	75	0	2	5–8th place semifinals
4	Guatemala	3	0	0	3	52	108	−56	0	5–8th place semifinals

Source: SCAHC
Rules for classification: 1) Points; 2) Head-to-head points; 3) Head-to-head goal difference; 4) Head-to-head goals scored; 5) Goal difference; 6) Goals scored; 7) Draw.
(H) Hosts

12 January 2026; 16:00	Brazil	40–8	Guatemala	SND Arena, Asunción
12 January 2026; 16:00		(24–5)		SND Arena, Asunción
12 January 2026; 16:00		Report		SND Arena, Asunción

12 January 2026; 20:00	Chile	25–31	Paraguay	SND Arena, Asunción
12 January 2026; 20:00		(13–13)		SND Arena, Asunción
12 January 2026; 20:00		Report		SND Arena, Asunción

13 January 2026; 14:00	Guatemala	19–35	Chile	SND Arena, Asunción
13 January 2026; 14:00		(8–18)		SND Arena, Asunción
13 January 2026; 14:00		Report		SND Arena, Asunción

13 January 2026; 20:00	Paraguay	27–36	Brazil	SND Arena, Asunción; Attendance: 300
13 January 2026; 20:00		(11–18)		SND Arena, Asunción; Attendance: 300
13 January 2026; 20:00		Report		SND Arena, Asunción; Attendance: 300

14 January 2026; 16:00	Brazil	25–15	Chile	SND Arena, Asunción; Attendance: 100
14 January 2026; 16:00		(13–7)		SND Arena, Asunción; Attendance: 100
14 January 2026; 16:00		Report		SND Arena, Asunción; Attendance: 100

14 January 2026; 20:00	Paraguay	33–25	Guatemala	SND Arena, Asunción; Attendance: 150
14 January 2026; 20:00		(19–13)		SND Arena, Asunción; Attendance: 150
14 January 2026; 20:00		Report		SND Arena, Asunción; Attendance: 150

== Knockout stage ==
=== Bracket ===
Semi-finals
15 January
Argentina	27
Paraguay	20
15 January
Brazil	25
Uruguay	17

Final
16 January
Argentina	18
Brazil	20
Third place
16 January
Paraguay	23
Uruguay	22

5–8th place bracket

5–8th place semifinals
15 January
Colombia	23
Guatemala	21
15 January
Chile	45
El Salvador	19

Fifth place
16 January
Colombia	26
Chile	36
Seventh place
16 January
Guatemala	34
El Salvador	18

=== 5–8th place semifinals ===
15 January 2026; 14:00	Colombia	23–21	Guatemala	SND Arena, Asunción; Attendance: 10
15 January 2026; 14:00		(8–8)		SND Arena, Asunción; Attendance: 10
15 January 2026; 14:00		Report		SND Arena, Asunción; Attendance: 10

15 January 2026; 16:00	Chile	45–19	El Salvador	SND Arena, Asunción; Attendance: 50
15 January 2026; 16:00		(17–10)		SND Arena, Asunción; Attendance: 50
15 January 2026; 16:00		Report		SND Arena, Asunción; Attendance: 50

=== Semifinals ===
15 January 2026; 18:00	Brazil	25–17	Uruguay	SND Arena, Asunción; Attendance: 350
15 January 2026; 18:00		(12–7)		SND Arena, Asunción; Attendance: 350
15 January 2026; 18:00		Report		SND Arena, Asunción; Attendance: 350

15 January 2026; 20:00	Argentina	27–20	Paraguay	SND Arena, Asunción; Attendance: 400; Referees: Corrêa, Corrêa (BRA)
15 January 2026; 20:00	Molina 7	(13–11)	Arviniagaldez 5	SND Arena, Asunción; Attendance: 400; Referees: Corrêa, Corrêa (BRA)
15 January 2026; 20:00	2× (suspension)	Report	1× (yellow card) 3× (suspension)	SND Arena, Asunción; Attendance: 400; Referees: Corrêa, Corrêa (BRA)

=== Seventh place game ===
16 January 2026; 14:00	Guatemala	34–18	El Salvador	SND Arena, Asunción; Attendance: 30
16 January 2026; 14:00		(18–3)		SND Arena, Asunción; Attendance: 30
16 January 2026; 14:00		Report		SND Arena, Asunción; Attendance: 30

=== Fifth place game ===
16 January 2026; 16:00	Colombia	26–36	Chile	SND Arena, Asunción; Attendance: 45
16 January 2026; 16:00		(14–18)		SND Arena, Asunción; Attendance: 45
16 January 2026; 16:00		Report		SND Arena, Asunción; Attendance: 45

=== Third place game ===
16 January 2026; 18:00	Paraguay	23–22	Uruguay	SND Arena, Asunción; Attendance: 650
16 January 2026; 18:00		(13–14)		SND Arena, Asunción; Attendance: 650
16 January 2026; 18:00		Report		SND Arena, Asunción; Attendance: 650

=== Final ===
16 January 2026; 20:00	Argentina	18–20	Brazil	SND Arena, Asunción; Attendance: 500; Referees: Araújo, Perdomo (URU)
16 January 2026; 20:00	Ventos 4	(6–9)	Ladeia 6	SND Arena, Asunción; Attendance: 500; Referees: Araújo, Perdomo (URU)
16 January 2026; 20:00	1× (yellow card) 1× (suspension)	Report	2× (suspension)	SND Arena, Asunción; Attendance: 500; Referees: Araújo, Perdomo (URU)

== Final standing ==
Rank	Team
1st place, gold medalist(s)	Brazil
2nd place, silver medalist(s)	Argentina
3rd place, bronze medalist(s)	Paraguay
4	Uruguay
5	Chile
6	Colombia
7	Guatemala
8	El Salvador

Qualified for the 2026 U20 World Championship
Qualified for the 2026 IHF Inter-Continental Trophy
