= Handball at the 2025 Junior Pan American Games =

Handball at the 2025 Junior American Games
- Venue: SND Arena
- Start date: August 10, 2025
- End date: August 22, 2025
- No. of events: 2 (1 men, 1 women)
- Competitors: 224 from 8 nations

The handball events at the 2025 Junior Pan American Games were held at the SND Arena, located in the Secretaría Nacional de Deportes Complex, in Asunción. The events were contested between August 10 and 22, 2025.

Two tournaments were contested, one for men and one for women. The winner of each event qualified for the 2027 Pan American Games in Lima, Peru.

== Schedule ==
GS	Group stage	SF	Semi-finals	B	Bronze medal match	F	Gold medal match

Date Event	Sun 10	Mon 11	Tue 12	Wed 13	Thu 14	Fri 15		Sat 16	Sun 17	Mon 18	Tue 19	Wed 20	Thu 21	Fri 22	
Men									GS	GS	GS		SF	B	F
Women	GS	GS	GS		SF	B	F								

== Qualification ==
A total of eight teams qualified for each tournament.

=== Men's qualification ===
Qualification	Date	Host/Country	Berths	Qualified team
Host country	—N/a		1	Paraguay
IHF Trophy Junior (COSCABAL)	29 October–3 November 2024	Managua	3	Argentina; Brazil; Uruguay
IHF Trophy Junior (NACHC)	3–9 December 2024	Mexico City	3	Cuba; Mexico; United States
Wildcard	Wildcard	Wildcard	1	Chile
Total			8	

=== Women's qualification ===
Qualification	Date	Host/Country	Berths	Qualified team
Host country	—N/a		1	Paraguay
IHF Trophy Junior (COSCABAL)	March 2025	Paraguay	3	Argentina; Brazil; Chile
IHF Trophy Junior (NACHC)	31 March–4 April 2025	Mexico City	3	Cuba; Mexico; United States
Wildcard	Wildcard	Wildcard	1	Uruguay
Total			8	

== Medal summary ==
=== Medal table ===
* Host nation (Paraguay)

Rank	Nation	Gold	Silver	Bronze	Total
1	Brazil	2	0	0	2
2	Argentina	0	2	0	2
3	Paraguay*	0	0	1	1
3	United States	0	0	1	1
Totals (4 entries)		2	2	2	6

=== Medalists ===
Event	Gold	Silver	Bronze
Men's tournament	Brazil; Emerson Alves; Vinicius Bertoldo; Diogo Borja; Thiago Cruz; Rafael Damião; Lucas Gabriel; Gabriel Gomes; Renan Iziquiel; João Vitor Lindoso; Mikael Lopes; Guilherme Maia; Juan Sebastião; Gabriel Silva; Vinicius Stache; Kayky Fernando	Argentina; Santino Diotallevi; Martín Maya; Nicolás Rodríguez; Nicolás Barceló; Tobías Ojea; Nicolás Tavella; Ignacio Silva; Lorenzo Ortmann; Bautista Gallardo; Tobías Pereyra; Tiago Maidana; Lucas Obregón; Lautaro Rodríguez; Santiago Laborde	United States; Rodrigo Campos; Oskar Trummer; Matthew Spranda; Grayson Wide; Benjamin Pedersen; Benjamin Edwards; Martín Brunvold; Jamie Merkel; Maximillian Olesen; Kaeden Kuhlmeyer; Kahlil Liden; Jordan Fernández; Maksim McCauley; Csaba Darvas
Women's tournament	Brazil; Eduarda Borges; Yasmin Ferreira; Luana Flores; Ryanne Gama; Samanta Hevelin; Sophia Kieling; Raquel Ladeia; Lorenna Loyane; Ana Julia Machado; Maria Clara Martins; Ana Karolina Nunes; Beatriz Rodrigues; Maria Eduarda Rodrigues; Nhauany Teixeira	Argentina; Florencia Carrasco; Sofía Gull; Miranda Kruk; Mara López; Helena Molina; Mora Carballo; Catalina Losarcos; Lola Nuñez; Xiomara Sokalski; Isabella Patrone; Valentina Stanich; Delfina Arzola; Kiara Manzo; Zoe Oriolo	Paraguay; Giovana Silva; Luana Pérez; Fiorella Enriquez; Karen Cantero; Ivana Ibañez; Maria Arzamendia; Anna Macke; Thiara Villasboa; Ximena Palma; Valentina Lombardo; Milagros Samaniego; Maria Paz Quiñonez; Renata Sosa; Vannia Recalde; Victoria Pellegrini

== Men's tournament ==
=== Preliminary round ===
All times are local (UTC−3).

==== Group A ====
Pos	Team	Pld	W	D	L	GF	GA	GD	Pts	Qualification
1	Argentina	3	3	0	0	100	67	+33	6	Semifinals
2	Paraguay	3	1	0	2	70	87	−17	2 (Note: Paraguay 2 Pts, +1 GD; Uruguay 2 Pts, 0 GD; Cuba 2 Pts, –1 GD)	Semifinals
3	Uruguay	3	1	0	2	66	71	−5	2	5–8th place semifinals
4	Cuba	3	1	0	2	83	94	−11	2	5–8th place semifinals

Source: Asunción 2025
Rules for classification: 1) points; 2) head-to-head points; 3) head-to-head goal difference; 4) head-to-head goals scored; 5) goal difference; 6) goals scored; 7) draw.
Notes:

17 August 2025; 17:00	Argentina	36–26	Cuba	SND Arena, Asunción; Referees: Gonçalves, Dezembro (BRA)
17 August 2025; 17:00	N. Rodríguez 7	(16–14)	Miniet 10	SND Arena, Asunción; Referees: Gonçalves, Dezembro (BRA)
17 August 2025; 17:00	3× (suspension)	Report	4× (suspension)	SND Arena, Asunción; Referees: Gonçalves, Dezembro (BRA)

17 August 2025; 19:30	Paraguay	20–17	Uruguay	SND Arena, Asunción; Referees: Corrêa, Corrêa (BRA)
17 August 2025; 19:30	Acosta 7	(6–10)	Salles 4	SND Arena, Asunción; Referees: Corrêa, Corrêa (BRA)
17 August 2025; 19:30	1× (yellow card) 5× (suspension) 1× (red card)	Report	1× (yellow card) 2× (suspension) 1× (red card)	SND Arena, Asunción; Referees: Corrêa, Corrêa (BRA)

18 August 2025; 17:00	Cuba	22–25	Uruguay	SND Arena, Asunción; Referees: Alvarez, Gutiérrez (CHI)
18 August 2025; 17:00	Lafontan 9	(16–11)	Raña 8	SND Arena, Asunción; Referees: Alvarez, Gutiérrez (CHI)
18 August 2025; 17:00	1× (yellow card) 5× (suspension) 1× (red card)	Report	1× (yellow card) 3× (suspension)	SND Arena, Asunción; Referees: Alvarez, Gutiérrez (CHI)

18 August 2025; 19:30	Argentina	35–17	Paraguay	SND Arena, Asunción; Referees: De Jesús, Agramonte (DOM)
18 August 2025; 19:30	Barceló, N. Rodríguez 6	(18–11)	Barrios, Florentin 4	SND Arena, Asunción; Referees: De Jesús, Agramonte (DOM)
18 August 2025; 19:30	8× (suspension)	Report	2× (suspension)	SND Arena, Asunción; Referees: De Jesús, Agramonte (DOM)

19 August 2025; 17:00	Argentina	29–24	Uruguay	SND Arena, Asunción; Referees: Gonçalves, Dezembro (BRA)
19 August 2025; 17:00	Obregón 8	(17–10)	Cabrera, Raña 5	SND Arena, Asunción; Referees: Gonçalves, Dezembro (BRA)
19 August 2025; 17:00	1× (yellow card) 7× (suspension)	Report	1× (yellow card) 6× (suspension)	SND Arena, Asunción; Referees: Gonçalves, Dezembro (BRA)

19 August 2025; 19:30	Paraguay	33–35	Cuba	SND Arena, Asunción; Referees: Sosa, Lemes (URU)
19 August 2025; 19:30	J. Martinez 7	(18–17)	Miniet 11	SND Arena, Asunción; Referees: Sosa, Lemes (URU)
19 August 2025; 19:30	1× (yellow card) 3× (suspension) 1× (red card)	Report	1× (yellow card) 5× (suspension) 1× (red card)	SND Arena, Asunción; Referees: Sosa, Lemes (URU)

==== Group B ====
Pos	Team	Pld	W	D	L	GF	GA	GD	Pts	Qualification
1	Brazil	3	3	0	0	102	68	+34	6	Semifinals
2	United States	3	2	0	1	87	90	−3	4	Semifinals
3	Chile	3	1	0	2	74	77	−3	2	5–8th place semifinals
4	Mexico	3	0	0	3	83	111	−28	0	5–8th place semifinals

Source: Asunción 2025
Rules for classification: 1) points; 2) head-to-head points; 3) head-to-head goal difference; 4) head-to-head goals scored; 5) goal difference; 6) goals scored; 7) draw.

17 August 2025; 09:00	Brazil	40–27	Mexico	SND Arena, Asunción; Referees: De Jesús, Agramonte (DOM)
17 August 2025; 09:00	Stache 8	(17–15)	three players 5	SND Arena, Asunción; Referees: De Jesús, Agramonte (DOM)
17 August 2025; 09:00	3× (suspension)	Report	1× (suspension)	SND Arena, Asunción; Referees: De Jesús, Agramonte (DOM)

17 August 2025; 11:30	United States	26–23	Chile	SND Arena, Asunción; Referees: Sosa, Lemes (URU)
17 August 2025; 11:30	Edwards 6	(13–13)	Oyarzún 7	SND Arena, Asunción; Referees: Sosa, Lemes (URU)
17 August 2025; 11:30	1× (yellow card) 5× (suspension)	Report	2× (suspension)	SND Arena, Asunción; Referees: Sosa, Lemes (URU)

18 August 2025; 09:00	Brazil	30–19	Chile	SND Arena, Asunción; Referees: Sosa, Lemes (URU)
18 August 2025; 09:00	Bertoldo, Lopes 5	(16–8)	Moreno, Oyarzún 4	SND Arena, Asunción; Referees: Sosa, Lemes (URU)
18 August 2025; 09:00	5× (suspension) 1× (red card)	Report	2× (suspension)	SND Arena, Asunción; Referees: Sosa, Lemes (URU)

18 August 2025; 11:30	Mexico	35–39	United States	SND Arena, Asunción; Referees: Corrêa, Corrêa (BRA)
18 August 2025; 11:30	I. Martinez, Rivas 6	(15–19)	Campos, Merkel 8	SND Arena, Asunción; Referees: Corrêa, Corrêa (BRA)
18 August 2025; 11:30	5× (suspension) 1× (red card)	Report	4× (suspension)	SND Arena, Asunción; Referees: Corrêa, Corrêa (BRA)

19 August 2025; 09:00	Mexico	21–32	Chile	SND Arena, Asunción; Referees: De Jesús, Agramonte (DOM)
19 August 2025; 09:00	Anguiano 5	(10–15)	Hernández 6	SND Arena, Asunción; Referees: De Jesús, Agramonte (DOM)
19 August 2025; 09:00	1× (yellow card) 4× (suspension)	Report	3× (suspension)	SND Arena, Asunción; Referees: De Jesús, Agramonte (DOM)

19 August 2025; 11:30	Brazil	32–22	United States	SND Arena, Asunción; Referees: Alvarez, Gutiérrez (CHI)
19 August 2025; 11:30	three players 5	(13–10)	McCauley 5	SND Arena, Asunción; Referees: Alvarez, Gutiérrez (CHI)
19 August 2025; 11:30	1× (yellow card) 1× (suspension)	Report	2× (suspension)	SND Arena, Asunción; Referees: Alvarez, Gutiérrez (CHI)

=== Classification round ===
Cross-overs
21 August — Asunción
Uruguay	26
Mexico (ET)	27
21 August — Asunción
Chile	21
Cuba	24

Fifth place
22 August — Asunción
Mexico	37
Cuba	30
Seventh place
22 August — Asunción
Uruguay	18
Chile	19

==== 5–8th place semifinals ====
21 August 2025
09:00
Uruguay
26–27 (ET)
Mexico
SND Arena, Asunción
Referees: Alvarez, Gutiérrez (CHI)
Fernandez 4
(12–10)
Rivas 7
2× (yellow card) 3× (suspension)
Report
2× (yellow card) 5× (suspension) 1× (red card)

FT: 23–23 ET: 3–4

21 August 2025; 12:00	Chile	21–24	Cuba	SND Arena, Asunción; Referees: Gonçalves, Dezembro (BRA)
21 August 2025; 12:00	Castillo 6	(9–8)	Lafontan 9	SND Arena, Asunción; Referees: Gonçalves, Dezembro (BRA)
21 August 2025; 12:00	1× (yellow card) 2× (suspension)	Report	3× (suspension)	SND Arena, Asunción; Referees: Gonçalves, Dezembro (BRA)

==== Seventh place match ====
22 August 2025; 09:00	Uruguay	18–19	Chile	SND Arena, Asunción; Referees: Gonçalves, Dezembro (BRA)
22 August 2025; 09:00	Raña 4	(9–10)	Cárcamo 5	SND Arena, Asunción; Referees: Gonçalves, Dezembro (BRA)
22 August 2025; 09:00	1× (yellow card) 2× (suspension) 1× (red card)	Report	1× (yellow card) 2× (suspension) 1× (red card)	SND Arena, Asunción; Referees: Gonçalves, Dezembro (BRA)

==== Fifth place match ====
22 August 2025; 12:00	Mexico	37–30	Cuba	SND Arena, Asunción; Referees: De Jesús, Agramonte (DOM)
22 August 2025; 12:00	Flores 9	(17–18)	Lafontan 11	SND Arena, Asunción; Referees: De Jesús, Agramonte (DOM)
22 August 2025; 12:00	1× (yellow card) 3× (suspension)	Report	1× (suspension)	SND Arena, Asunción; Referees: De Jesús, Agramonte (DOM)

=== Medal round ===
Semifinals
21 August — Asunción
Argentina	28
United States	13
21 August — Asunción
Brazil	45
Paraguay	20

Final
22 August — Asunción
Argentina	27
Brazil	29
Third place
22 August — Asunción
United States	39
Paraguay	29

==== Semifinals ====
21 August 2025; 17:00	Argentina	28–13	United States	SND Arena, Asunción; Referees: Corrêa, Corrêa (BRA)
21 August 2025; 17:00	Obregón 6	(13–8)	Edwards 4	SND Arena, Asunción; Referees: Corrêa, Corrêa (BRA)
21 August 2025; 17:00	3× (suspension)	Report	1× (suspension) 1× (red card)	SND Arena, Asunción; Referees: Corrêa, Corrêa (BRA)

21 August 2025; 20:00	Brazil	45–20	Paraguay	SND Arena, Asunción; Referees: De Jesús, Agramonte (DOM)
21 August 2025; 20:00	Bertoldo, Stache 7	(20–10)	Barrios 4	SND Arena, Asunción; Referees: De Jesús, Agramonte (DOM)
21 August 2025; 20:00	3× (suspension)	Report	1× (suspension)	SND Arena, Asunción; Referees: De Jesús, Agramonte (DOM)

==== Bronze medal match ====
22 August 2025; 17:00	United States	39–29	Paraguay	SND Arena, Asunción; Referees: Corrêa, Corrêa (BRA)
22 August 2025; 17:00	Edwards 11	(17–11)	Acosta 7	SND Arena, Asunción; Referees: Corrêa, Corrêa (BRA)
22 August 2025; 17:00	5× (suspension)	Report	1× (yellow card) 3× (suspension) 1× (red card)	SND Arena, Asunción; Referees: Corrêa, Corrêa (BRA)

==== Gold medal match ====
22 August 2025; 20:00	Argentina	27–29	Brazil	SND Arena, Asunción; Referees: Sosa, Lemes (URU)
22 August 2025; 20:00	N. Rodríguez 10	(14–11)	Lopes 9	SND Arena, Asunción; Referees: Sosa, Lemes (URU)
22 August 2025; 20:00	1× (yellow card) 2× (suspension)	Report	2× (yellow card) 4× (suspension) 1× (red card)	SND Arena, Asunción; Referees: Sosa, Lemes (URU)

=== Final standing ===
Rank	Team
1st place, gold medalist(s)	Brazil
2nd place, silver medalist(s)	Argentina
3rd place, bronze medalist(s)	United States
4	Paraguay
5	Mexico
6	Cuba
7	Chile
8	Uruguay

Team qualified to the 2027 Pan American Games

== Women's tournament ==
=== Preliminary round ===
All times are local (UTC−3).

==== Group A ====
Pos	Team	Pld	W	D	L	GF	GA	GD	Pts	Qualification
1	Brazil	3	3	0	0	103	45	+58	6	Semifinals
2	Argentina	3	2	0	1	97	55	+42	4	Semifinals
3	Mexico	3	1	0	2	63	102	−39	2	5–8th place semifinals
4	Cuba	3	0	0	3	59	120	−61	0	5–8th place semifinals

Source: Asunción 2025
Rules for classification: 1) points; 2) head-to-head points; 3) head-to-head goal difference; 4) head-to-head goals scored; 5) goal difference; 6) goals scored; 7) draw.

10 August 2025; 09:00	Brazil	43–15	Mexico	SND Arena, Asunción; Referees: Alvarez, Gutiérrez (CHI)
10 August 2025; 09:00	Ladeia 7	(21–8)	Arenas 6	SND Arena, Asunción; Referees: Alvarez, Gutiérrez (CHI)
10 August 2025; 09:00	1× (yellow card) 3× (suspension)	Report	1× (yellow card) 5× (suspension)	SND Arena, Asunción; Referees: Alvarez, Gutiérrez (CHI)

10 August 2025; 11:30	Argentina	47–20	Cuba	SND Arena, Asunción; Referees: Gonçalves, Dezembro (BRA)
10 August 2025; 11:30	Carballo 10	(23–10)	Chirino 5	SND Arena, Asunción; Referees: Gonçalves, Dezembro (BRA)
10 August 2025; 11:30	1× (yellow card) 1× (suspension)	Report	1× (yellow card) 3× (suspension)	SND Arena, Asunción; Referees: Gonçalves, Dezembro (BRA)

11 August 2025; 09:00	Cuba	12–39	Brazil	SND Arena, Asunción; Referees: Sosa, Lemes (URU)
11 August 2025; 09:00	Sardiñas 5	(8–18)	Loyane 11	SND Arena, Asunción; Referees: Sosa, Lemes (URU)
11 August 2025; 09:00	4× (suspension) 1× (red card)	Report	1× (yellow card) 3× (suspension)	SND Arena, Asunción; Referees: Sosa, Lemes (URU)

11 August 2025; 11:30	Mexico	14–32	Argentina	SND Arena, Asunción; Referees: De Jesús, Agramonte (DOM)
11 August 2025; 11:30	Arenas 8	(7–18)	Gull, Losarcos 5	SND Arena, Asunción; Referees: De Jesús, Agramonte (DOM)
11 August 2025; 11:30	3× (suspension)	Report	2× (yellow card) 3× (suspension)	SND Arena, Asunción; Referees: De Jesús, Agramonte (DOM)

12 August 2025; 09:00	Cuba	27–34	Mexico	SND Arena, Asunción; Referees: De Jesús, Agramonte (DOM)
12 August 2025; 09:00	Hernandez, Mazorra 8	(16–16)	Arenas 12	SND Arena, Asunción; Referees: De Jesús, Agramonte (DOM)
12 August 2025; 09:00	3× (suspension)	Report	4× (suspension)	SND Arena, Asunción; Referees: De Jesús, Agramonte (DOM)

12 August 2025; 11:30	Argentina	18–21	Brazil	SND Arena, Asunción; Referees: Aguilera, Gutiérrez (CHI)
12 August 2025; 11:30	Carballo 5	(11–13)	Ladeia 9	SND Arena, Asunción; Referees: Aguilera, Gutiérrez (CHI)
12 August 2025; 11:30	5× (suspension)	Report	1× (yellow card) 4× (suspension)	SND Arena, Asunción; Referees: Aguilera, Gutiérrez (CHI)

==== Group B ====
Pos	Team	Pld	W	D	L	GF	GA	GD	Pts	Qualification
1	Paraguay	3	3	0	0	71	51	+20	6	Semifinals
2	Uruguay	3	2	0	1	60	61	−1	4	Semifinals
3	Chile	3	1	0	2	81	84	−3	2	5–8th place semifinals
4	United States	3	0	0	3	54	70	−16	0	5–8th place semifinals

Source: Asunción 2025
Rules for classification: 1) points; 2) head-to-head points; 3) head-to-head goal difference; 4) head-to-head goals scored; 5) goal difference; 6) goals scored; 7) draw.

10 August 2025; 17:00	Chile	22–29	Uruguay	SND Arena, Asunción; Referees: Corrêa, Corrêa (BRA)
10 August 2025; 17:00	Riquelme 5	(12–16)	Villalba 8	SND Arena, Asunción; Referees: Corrêa, Corrêa (BRA)
10 August 2025; 17:00	2× (yellow card) 2× (suspension)	Report	1× (yellow card) 6× (suspension)	SND Arena, Asunción; Referees: Corrêa, Corrêa (BRA)

10 August 2025; 19:30	Paraguay	19–12	United States	SND Arena, Asunción; Referees: Monjaras, López (MEX)
10 August 2025; 19:30	Samaniego 5	(11–8)	M. Ready 4	SND Arena, Asunción; Referees: Monjaras, López (MEX)
10 August 2025; 19:30	1× (yellow card) 6× (suspension) 1× (red card)	Report	1× (suspension)	SND Arena, Asunción; Referees: Monjaras, López (MEX)

11 August 2025; 17:00	United States	26–31	Chile	SND Arena, Asunción; Referees: Gonçalves, Dezembro (BRA)
11 August 2025; 17:00	Cruz, M. Ready 6	(9–18)	Paul 6	SND Arena, Asunción; Referees: Gonçalves, Dezembro (BRA)
11 August 2025; 17:00	1× (yellow card) 2× (suspension)	Report	1× (yellow card) 3× (suspension)	SND Arena, Asunción; Referees: Gonçalves, Dezembro (BRA)

11 August 2025; 19:30	Uruguay	11–23	Paraguay	SND Arena, Asunción; Referees: Corrêa, Corrêa (BRA)
11 August 2025; 19:30	Campos 6	(4–11)	Enriquez 6	SND Arena, Asunción; Referees: Corrêa, Corrêa (BRA)
11 August 2025; 19:30	1× (yellow card) 3× (suspension)	Report	3× (suspension)	SND Arena, Asunción; Referees: Corrêa, Corrêa (BRA)

12 August 2025; 17:00	United States	16–20	Uruguay	SND Arena, Asunción; Referees: Monjaras, López (MEX)
12 August 2025; 17:00	Cruz 5	(10–11)	Campos 9	SND Arena, Asunción; Referees: Monjaras, López (MEX)
12 August 2025; 17:00	1× (yellow card) 1× (suspension)	Report	1× (yellow card) 3× (suspension)	SND Arena, Asunción; Referees: Monjaras, López (MEX)

12 August 2025; 19:30	Paraguay	29–28	Chile	SND Arena, Asunción; Referees: Sosa, Lemes (URU)
12 August 2025; 19:30	Enriquez 9	(17–14)	Riquelme 6	SND Arena, Asunción; Referees: Sosa, Lemes (URU)
12 August 2025; 19:30	2× (yellow card) 4× (suspension) 1× (red card)	Report	2× (suspension)	SND Arena, Asunción; Referees: Sosa, Lemes (URU)

=== Classification round ===
Cross-overs
14 August — Asunción
Mexico	22
United States	27
14 August — Asunción
Chile	37
Cuba	24

Fifth place
15 August — Asunción
United States	24
Chile	30
Seventh place
15 August — Asunción
Mexico	25
Cuba	34

==== 5–8th place semifinals ====
14 August 2025; 09:00	Mexico	22–27	United States	SND Arena, Asunción; Referees: Gonçalves, Dezembro (BRA)
14 August 2025; 09:00	Arenas 8	(16–12)	Cruz 8	SND Arena, Asunción; Referees: Gonçalves, Dezembro (BRA)
14 August 2025; 09:00	6× (suspension)	Report		SND Arena, Asunción; Referees: Gonçalves, Dezembro (BRA)

14 August 2025; 12:00	Chile	37–24	Cuba	SND Arena, Asunción; Referees: De Jesús, Agramonte (DOM)
14 August 2025; 12:00	Paul 7	(17–9)	Hernandez 7	SND Arena, Asunción; Referees: De Jesús, Agramonte (DOM)
14 August 2025; 12:00	1× (yellow card) 1× (suspension)	Report	7× (suspension)	SND Arena, Asunción; Referees: De Jesús, Agramonte (DOM)

==== Seventh place match ====
15 August 2025; 09:00	Mexico	25–34	Cuba	SND Arena, Asunción; Referees: De Jesús, Agramonte (DOM)
15 August 2025; 09:00	Arenas 8	(11–15)	Mazorra 9	SND Arena, Asunción; Referees: De Jesús, Agramonte (DOM)
15 August 2025; 09:00	1× (suspension)	Report	3× (suspension)	SND Arena, Asunción; Referees: De Jesús, Agramonte (DOM)

==== Fifth place match ====
15 August 2025; 12:00	United States	24–30	Chile	SND Arena, Asunción; Referees: Gonçalves, Dezembro (BRA)
15 August 2025; 12:00	E. Ready 7	(14–14)	Riquelme 5	SND Arena, Asunción; Referees: Gonçalves, Dezembro (BRA)
15 August 2025; 12:00	1× (suspension)	Report	1× (suspension)	SND Arena, Asunción; Referees: Gonçalves, Dezembro (BRA)

=== Medal round ===
Semifinals
14 August — Asunción
Brazil	27
Uruguay	8
14 August — Asunción
Paraguay	17
Argentina	23

Final
15 August — Asunción
Brazil	22
Argentina	19
Third place
15 August — Asunción
Paraguay	20
Uruguay	18

==== Semifinals ====
14 August 2025; 17:00	Brazil	27–8	Uruguay	SND Arena, Asunción; Referees: Alvarez, Gutiérrez (CHI)
14 August 2025; 17:00	Ladeia 6	(15–4)	Balseiro, Campos 3	SND Arena, Asunción; Referees: Alvarez, Gutiérrez (CHI)
14 August 2025; 17:00	3× (suspension)	Report	3× (suspension)	SND Arena, Asunción; Referees: Alvarez, Gutiérrez (CHI)

14 August 2025; 20:00	Paraguay	17–23	Argentina	SND Arena, Asunción; Referees: Corrêa, Corrêa (BRA)
14 August 2025; 20:00	Enriquez 5	(9–9)	Molina 8	SND Arena, Asunción; Referees: Corrêa, Corrêa (BRA)
14 August 2025; 20:00	3× (suspension)	Report	4× (suspension)	SND Arena, Asunción; Referees: Corrêa, Corrêa (BRA)

==== Bronze medal match ====
15 August 2025; 17:00	Uruguay	18–20	Paraguay	SND Arena, Asunción; Referees: Corrêa, Corrêa (BRA)
15 August 2025; 17:00	Campos 9	(6–9)	Enriquez 6	SND Arena, Asunción; Referees: Corrêa, Corrêa (BRA)
15 August 2025; 17:00	4× (suspension)	Report	1× (yellow card) 3× (suspension)	SND Arena, Asunción; Referees: Corrêa, Corrêa (BRA)

==== Gold medal match ====
15 August 2025; 20:00	Brazil	22–19	Argentina	SND Arena, Asunción; Referees: Sosa, Lemes (URU)
15 August 2025; 20:00	Ladeia 7	(15–8)	Carballo 6	SND Arena, Asunción; Referees: Sosa, Lemes (URU)
15 August 2025; 20:00	3× (suspension)	Report	1× (yellow card) 3× (suspension)	SND Arena, Asunción; Referees: Sosa, Lemes (URU)

=== Final standing ===
Rank	Team
1st place, gold medalist(s)	Brazil
2nd place, silver medalist(s)	Argentina
3rd place, bronze medalist(s)	Paraguay
4	Uruguay
5	Chile
6	United States
7	Cuba
8	Mexico

Team qualified to the 2027 Pan American Games
