= Martina Romero =

Argentine handball player (born 2002)

Personal information
- Nationality: Argentine
- Born: 18 March 2002 (age 24) Buenos Aires, Argentina
- Height: 1.73 m (5 ft 8 in)

Sport
- Sport: Handball
- Position: Centre back
- Current club: CBF Málaga Costa del Sol
- Number: 3

Senior clubs
- Years: Team
- 2022: Sédalo
- 2022–2025: Aula Cultural
- 2025–: CBF Málaga Costa del Sol
National team
Years	Team	Apps	(Gls)
2022–	Argentina	20	(30)
Medal record
Pan American Games
Silver medal – second place	2023 Santiago	Team
South American Games
Bronze medal – third place	2022 Cochabamba	Team
South and Central American Junior Championship
Gold medal – first place	2022 Buenos Aires	Team
Junior Pan American Games
Gold medal – first place	2021 Cali	Team
- Updated on 12 December 2025

Martina "Martu" Romero (born 18 March 2002) is an Argentine handball player for Spanish club CBF Málaga Costa del Sol and the Argentine national team.

== Club career ==
Romero trained at the Argentinian club Sédalo, from where she moved to Europe during the 2022–23 winter transfer window, to play for Aula Cultural. She renewed her contract with Aula Cultural until June 2025. In April 2025, Aula Cultural announced her departure from the team.

With Aula Cultural, Romero made her debut in the EHF Women's European Cup in the 2024–25 season, reaching the quarterfinals and being eliminated by MKS Urbis. She finished her first season in Europe with 11 goals.

At the end of the season, CBF Málaga Costa del Sol announced that Romero has signed with them.

== International career ==
As a cadet, Romero played in the 2017 South American Championship, finishing in 2nd place. As a junior, she played in the 2022 IHF Women's U20 Handball World Championship, the 2021 Junior Pan American Games and 2022 South and Central American Women's Junior Handball Championship, where La Garra ended up winning the latter two.

Already in the senior national team, Romero made her debut at the 2022 South American Games, where her team finished in third place. She was named to the Argentine squad for the 2023 Pan American Games and the 2023 World Championship, where her team won a silver medal in the former.

Romero was part of the Argentine squad for the 2025 World Women's Handball Championship.
