= South and Central American Women's Junior Handball Championship =

Handball competition

- Current season, competition or edition: 2026 South and Central American Women's Junior Handball Championship
- Sport: Handball
- Founded: 2022
- First season: 2022
- Continent: SCAHC (South America/Central America)
- Most recent champion: Brazil (1st title)
- Most titles: Argentina (2 titles)

The South and Central American Women's Junior Handball Championship is the official competition for junior national handball teams of South America and Central America, and takes place every two years. In addition to crowning the South and Central American junior champions, the tournament also serves as a qualifying tournament for the World Junior Handball Championship. The first tournament was held in 2022 in Buenos Aires, Argentina.

== Summaries ==
Year	Host	Final			Third place match		
Year	Host	Champion	Score	Runner-up	Third place	Score	Fourth place
2022; Details	(Argentina); Buenos Aires	Argentina	Round-robin	Brazil	Chile	Round-robin	Paraguay
2023; Details	(Argentina); Buenos Aires	Argentina	28–22	Brazil	Chile	26–23	Uruguay
2026; Details	(Paraguay); Asunción	Brazil	20–18	Argentina	Paraguay	23–22	Uruguay

== Medal table ==
Rank	Nation	Gold	Silver	Bronze	Total
1	Argentina	2	1	0	3
2	Brazil	1	2	0	3
3	Chile	0	0	2	2
4	Paraguay	0	0	1	1
Totals (4 entries)		3	3	3	9

== Participating nations ==
Team	(Argentina); 2022	(Argentina); 2023	(Paraguay); 2026	Years
Argentina	1st	1st	2nd	3
Brazil	2nd	2nd	1st	3
Chile	3rd	3rd	5th	3
Colombia		7th	6th	2
Costa Rica		8th		1
El Salvador			8th	1
Guatemala		6th	7th	2
Paraguay	4th		3rd	2
Peru		5th		1
Uruguay	5th	4th	4th	2
Venezuela			WD	0
Total	5	8	8	
