= Mikako =

- Gender: Female

Origin
- Origin: Japanese
- Meaning: Different meanings depending on the kanji used

Mikako (written: 美佳子, 美香子, 実日子, 実加子, 未華子, みかこ or 未可子) is a feminine Japanese given name. Notable people with the name include:

- Mikako, a member of five-girl J-pop girl group Faky
- Mikako Ichikawa (市川 実日子; born 1978), Japanese actress and model
- Mikako Ishino (石野 実加子; born 1988), Japanese handball player
- Mikako Izawa (井澤 美香子; born 1994), Japanese voice actress
- Mikako Komatsu (小松 未可子; born 1988), Japanese voice actress
- Mikako Kotani (小谷 実可子; born 1966), Japanese synchronized swimmer
- Mikako Tabe (多部 未華子; born 1989), Japanese actress
- Mikako Takahashi (高橋 美佳子; born 1980), Japanese voice actress and singer

== Fictional characters ==
- Mikako Satsukitane (五月田根 美香子), a character in the manga series Sora no Otoshimono
- Mikako Minamino, a character in the AKB0048
