= 2023 South and Central American Women's Junior Handball Championship =

Tournament details
- Host country: Argentina
- Venue: 1 (in 1 host city)
- Dates: 14–18 November
- Teams: 8 (from 1 confederation)

Final positions
- Champions: Argentina (2nd title)
- Runners-up: Brazil
- Third place: Chile
- Fourth place: Uruguay

Tournament statistics
- Matches played: 20
- Goals scored: 978 (48.9 per match)

The 2023 South and Central American Women's Junior Handball Championship took place in Buenos Aires, Argentina, at La Casa del Handball Argentino stadium from 14 to 18 November 2023. It acted as the South and Central American qualifying tournament for the 2024 Women's Junior World Handball Championship.

== Qualification ==
Competition	Dates	Host	Vacancies	Qualified
Automatic qualifiers			4	Argentina; Brazil; Chile; Uruguay
IHF Trophy South and Central America – Central American Zone	9–13 May 2023	Guatemala City	2	Costa Rica; Guatemala
IHF Trophy South and Central America – South American Zone	6–10 June 2023	(Peru) Lima	2	Colombia; Peru

== Preliminary round ==
All times are local (UTC–3).

=== Group A ===
Pos	Team	Pld	W	D	L	GF	GA	GD	Pts	Qualification
1	Argentina (H)	3	3	0	0	117	27	+90	6	Semifinals
2	Uruguay	3	2	0	1	88	46	+42	4	Semifinals
3	Costa Rica	3	0	1	2	35	87	−52	1	5–8th place semifinals
4	Colombia	3	0	1	2	28	108	−80	1	5–8th place semifinals

Source: SCAHC
Rules for classification: 1) Points; 2) Head-to-head points; 3) Head-to-head goal difference; 4) Head-to-head goals scored; 5) Goal difference; 6) Goals scored; 7) Draw.
(H) Hosts

14 November 2023; 14:00	Uruguay	28–11	Costa Rica	La Casa del Handball Argentino, Buenos Aires; Attendance: 99
14 November 2023; 14:00		(12–4)		La Casa del Handball Argentino, Buenos Aires; Attendance: 99
14 November 2023; 14:00		Report		La Casa del Handball Argentino, Buenos Aires; Attendance: 99

14 November 2023; 20:00	Argentina	48–3	Colombia	La Casa del Handball Argentino, Buenos Aires; Attendance: 450; Referees: Lenzue, Burgos (URU)
14 November 2023; 20:00	Gull, Satto 6	(23–1)	three players 1	La Casa del Handball Argentino, Buenos Aires; Attendance: 450; Referees: Lenzue, Burgos (URU)
14 November 2023; 20:00	2× (suspension)	Report	1× (yellow card) 3× (suspension)	La Casa del Handball Argentino, Buenos Aires; Attendance: 450; Referees: Lenzue, Burgos (URU)

15 November 2023; 18:00	Colombia	8–43	Uruguay	La Casa del Handball Argentino, Buenos Aires; Attendance: 200
15 November 2023; 18:00		(4–19)		La Casa del Handball Argentino, Buenos Aires; Attendance: 200
15 November 2023; 18:00		Report		La Casa del Handball Argentino, Buenos Aires; Attendance: 200

15 November 2023; 20:00	Costa Rica	7–42	Argentina	La Casa del Handball Argentino, Buenos Aires; Attendance: 720; Referees: Cardoso, Araújo (BRA)
15 November 2023; 20:00	three players 2	(4–25)	Stanich 8	La Casa del Handball Argentino, Buenos Aires; Attendance: 720; Referees: Cardoso, Araújo (BRA)
15 November 2023; 20:00	3× (suspension)	Report	1× (yellow card)	La Casa del Handball Argentino, Buenos Aires; Attendance: 720; Referees: Cardoso, Araújo (BRA)

16 November 2023; 13:00	Colombia	17–17	Costa Rica	La Casa del Handball Argentino, Buenos Aires; Attendance: 100
16 November 2023; 13:00		(10–7)		La Casa del Handball Argentino, Buenos Aires; Attendance: 100
16 November 2023; 13:00		Report		La Casa del Handball Argentino, Buenos Aires; Attendance: 100

16 November 2023; 17:00	Argentina	27–17	Uruguay	La Casa del Handball Argentino, Buenos Aires; Referees: Cardoso, Araújo (BRA)
16 November 2023; 17:00		(14–6)		La Casa del Handball Argentino, Buenos Aires; Referees: Cardoso, Araújo (BRA)

=== Group B ===
Pos	Team	Pld	W	D	L	GF	GA	GD	Pts	Qualification
1	Brazil	3	3	0	0	114	57	+57	6	Semifinals
2	Chile	3	2	0	1	102	66	+36	4	Semifinals
3	Peru	3	1	0	2	72	112	−40	2	5–8th place semifinals
4	Guatemala	3	0	0	3	53	106	−53	0	5–8th place semifinals

Source: SCAHC
Rules for classification: 1) Points; 2) Head-to-head points; 3) Head-to-head goal difference; 4) Head-to-head goals scored; 5) Goal difference; 6) Goals scored; 7) Draw.

14 November 2023; 16:00	Chile	41–22	Peru	La Casa del Handball Argentino, Buenos Aires; Attendance: 101
14 November 2023; 16:00		(19–9)		La Casa del Handball Argentino, Buenos Aires; Attendance: 101
14 November 2023; 16:00		Report		La Casa del Handball Argentino, Buenos Aires; Attendance: 101

14 November 2023; 18:00	Brazil	41–11	Guatemala	La Casa del Handball Argentino, Buenos Aires; Attendance: 130
14 November 2023; 18:00		(21–7)		La Casa del Handball Argentino, Buenos Aires; Attendance: 130
14 November 2023; 18:00		Report		La Casa del Handball Argentino, Buenos Aires; Attendance: 130

15 November 2023; 14:00	Guatemala	16–34	Chile	La Casa del Handball Argentino, Buenos Aires; Attendance: 46
15 November 2023; 14:00		(6–19)		La Casa del Handball Argentino, Buenos Aires; Attendance: 46
15 November 2023; 14:00		Report		La Casa del Handball Argentino, Buenos Aires; Attendance: 46

15 November 2023; 16:00	Peru	19–45	Brazil	La Casa del Handball Argentino, Buenos Aires; Attendance: 110
15 November 2023; 16:00		(10–22)		La Casa del Handball Argentino, Buenos Aires; Attendance: 110
15 November 2023; 16:00		Report		La Casa del Handball Argentino, Buenos Aires; Attendance: 110

16 November 2023; 11:00	Guatemala	26–31	Peru	La Casa del Handball Argentino, Buenos Aires
16 November 2023; 11:00		(11–13)		La Casa del Handball Argentino, Buenos Aires

16 November 2023; 15:00	Brazil	28–27	Chile	La Casa del Handball Argentino, Buenos Aires
16 November 2023; 15:00		(15–11)		La Casa del Handball Argentino, Buenos Aires

== Knockout stage ==
=== Bracket ===
Semi-finals
17 November
Argentina	29
Chile	20
17 November
Brazil	25
Uruguay	21

Final
18 November
Argentina	28
Brazil	22
Third place
18 November
Uruguay	23
Chile	26

5–8th place bracket

5–8th place semifinals
17 November
Costa Rica	15
Guatemala	23
17 November
Peru	27
Colombia	22

Fifth place
18 November
Guatemala	23
Peru	27
Seventh place
18 November
Costa Rica	17
Colombia	21

=== 5–8th place semifinals ===
17 November 2023; 10:00	Costa Rica	15–23	Guatemala	La Casa del Handball Argentino, Buenos Aires; Attendance: 90
17 November 2023; 10:00		(8–9)		La Casa del Handball Argentino, Buenos Aires; Attendance: 90
17 November 2023; 10:00		Report		La Casa del Handball Argentino, Buenos Aires; Attendance: 90

17 November 2023; 12:00	Peru	27–22	Colombia	La Casa del Handball Argentino, Buenos Aires; Attendance: 90
17 November 2023; 12:00		(11–8)		La Casa del Handball Argentino, Buenos Aires; Attendance: 90
17 November 2023; 12:00		Report		La Casa del Handball Argentino, Buenos Aires; Attendance: 90

=== Semifinals ===
17 November 2023; 14:00	Brazil	25–21	Uruguay	La Casa del Handball Argentino, Buenos Aires; Attendance: 220
17 November 2023; 14:00		(12–10)		La Casa del Handball Argentino, Buenos Aires; Attendance: 220
17 November 2023; 14:00		Report		La Casa del Handball Argentino, Buenos Aires; Attendance: 220

17 November 2023; 16:00	Argentina	29–20	Chile	La Casa del Handball Argentino, Buenos Aires; Attendance: 420; Referees: Notario, Palacios (PAR)
17 November 2023; 16:00	Spinelli 8	(16–14)	Paul 6	La Casa del Handball Argentino, Buenos Aires; Attendance: 420; Referees: Notario, Palacios (PAR)
17 November 2023; 16:00	2× (yellow card) 4× (suspension)	Report	4× (suspension)	La Casa del Handball Argentino, Buenos Aires; Attendance: 420; Referees: Notario, Palacios (PAR)

=== Seventh place game ===
18 November 2023; 12:00	Costa Rica	17–21	Colombia	La Casa del Handball Argentino, Buenos Aires; Attendance: 50
18 November 2023; 12:00		(9–9)		La Casa del Handball Argentino, Buenos Aires; Attendance: 50
18 November 2023; 12:00		Report		La Casa del Handball Argentino, Buenos Aires; Attendance: 50

=== Fifth place game ===
18 November 2023; 14:00	Guatemala	23–27	Peru	La Casa del Handball Argentino, Buenos Aires; Attendance: 240
18 November 2023; 14:00		(12–12)		La Casa del Handball Argentino, Buenos Aires; Attendance: 240
18 November 2023; 14:00		Report		La Casa del Handball Argentino, Buenos Aires; Attendance: 240

=== Third place game ===
18 November 2023; 16:00	Uruguay	23–26	Chile	La Casa del Handball Argentino, Buenos Aires; Attendance: 305
18 November 2023; 16:00		(10–16)		La Casa del Handball Argentino, Buenos Aires; Attendance: 305
18 November 2023; 16:00		Report		La Casa del Handball Argentino, Buenos Aires; Attendance: 305

=== Final ===
18 November 2023; 18:00	Argentina	28–22	Brazil	La Casa del Handball Argentino, Buenos Aires; Attendance: 2,700; Referees: Burgos, Lenzue (URU)
18 November 2023; 18:00	Gull 8	(15–12)	J. Rodrigues 10	La Casa del Handball Argentino, Buenos Aires; Attendance: 2,700; Referees: Burgos, Lenzue (URU)
18 November 2023; 18:00	1× (yellow card) 3× (suspension)	Report	1× (yellow card) 3× (suspension)	La Casa del Handball Argentino, Buenos Aires; Attendance: 2,700; Referees: Burgos, Lenzue (URU)

== Final standing ==
Rank	Team
1st place, gold medalist(s)	Argentina
2nd place, silver medalist(s)	Brazil
3rd place, bronze medalist(s)	Chile
4	Uruguay
5	Peru
6	Guatemala
7	Colombia
8	Costa Rica

Qualified for the 2024 Women's Junior World Championship
Qualified for the 2024 IHF Inter-Continental Trophy

2023 South and Central American Women's Junior Champions

Argentina
Second title

Team roster: Ailin Cabaña, Martina Layus, Martina Tajes, Paloma Satto, Sofia Gull, Kiara Manzo, Azul Spinelli, Serena Santini, Florencia Carrasco, Candelaria Cuadrado, Zoe Oriolo, Magali Alfredi, Iara Caceres, Valentina Stanich, Miranda Kruk, Pilar Celiz.
Head coach: Hernan Siso.
