= 2022 South and Central American Women's Junior Handball Championship =

Tournament details
- Host country: Argentina
- Venue(s): 1 (in 1 host city)
- Dates: 22–26 March
- Teams: 5 (from 1 confederation)

Final positions
- Champions: Argentina (1st title)
- Runners-up: Brazil
- Third place: Chile
- Fourth place: Paraguay

Tournament statistics
- Matches played: 10
- Goals scored: 494 (49.4 per match)
- Top scorer(s): (Argentina) Delfina Ojea (21 goals)

The 2022 South and Central American Women's Junior Handball Championship was the first edition of the tournament, took place in Buenos Aires, Argentina, from 22 to 26 March 2022. It acted as the South and Central American qualifying tournament for the 2022 Women's Junior World Handball Championship.

== Standings ==
Pos	Team	Pld	W	D	L	GF	GA	GD	Pts	Qualification
1st place, gold medalist(s)	Argentina (H)	4	4	0	0	121	83	+38	8	2022 Junior World Championship
2nd place, silver medalist(s)	Brazil	4	3	0	1	109	81	+28	6	2022 Junior World Championship
3rd place, bronze medalist(s)	Chile	4	2	0	2	92	95	−3	4	2022 Junior World Championship
4	Paraguay	4	0	1	3	91	111	−20	1	2022 Junior World Championship
5	Uruguay	4	0	1	3	81	124	−43	1	

Source: handballargentina.org
Rules for classification: 1) Points; 2) Head-to-head points; 3) Head-to-head goal difference; 4) Head-to-head goals scored; 5) Goal difference; 6) Goals scored; 7) Draw.
(H) Hosts

== Results ==
All times are local (UTC–3).

22 March 2022; 17:00	Uruguay	17–36	Brazil	CeNARD, Buenos Aires; Attendance: 200; Referees: Estrada, Pineda (COL)
22 March 2022; 17:00	Iturriaga, Orellano 3	(9–18)	Nascimento 8	CeNARD, Buenos Aires; Attendance: 200; Referees: Estrada, Pineda (COL)
22 March 2022; 17:00	1× (yellow card) 4× (suspension) 1× (red card)	Report	5× (suspension)	CeNARD, Buenos Aires; Attendance: 200; Referees: Estrada, Pineda (COL)

22 March 2022; 19:30	Argentina	31–20	Chile	CeNARD, Buenos Aires; Attendance: 300; Referees: Corrêa, Corrêa (BRA)
22 March 2022; 19:30	Catera, Rivadeneira 5	(17–11)	Paul 5	CeNARD, Buenos Aires; Attendance: 300; Referees: Corrêa, Corrêa (BRA)
22 March 2022; 19:30	1× (yellow card) 3× (suspension)	Report	1× (yellow card) 4× (suspension)	CeNARD, Buenos Aires; Attendance: 300; Referees: Corrêa, Corrêa (BRA)

23 March 2022; 17:00	Paraguay	21–28	Chile	CeNARD, Buenos Aires; Attendance: 250; Referees: Conberse, Correa (ARG)
23 March 2022; 17:00	Vergara 5	(8–16)	Muller 7	CeNARD, Buenos Aires; Attendance: 250; Referees: Conberse, Correa (ARG)
23 March 2022; 17:00	1× (yellow card) 6× (suspension)	Report	1× (yellow card) 5× (suspension)	CeNARD, Buenos Aires; Attendance: 250; Referees: Conberse, Correa (ARG)

23 March 2022; 19:30	Argentina	37–18	Uruguay	CeNARD, Buenos Aires; Attendance: 800; Referees: Geraldello, Marques (BRA)
23 March 2022; 19:30	Ojea 9	(17–12)	Duarte 5	CeNARD, Buenos Aires; Attendance: 800; Referees: Geraldello, Marques (BRA)
23 March 2022; 19:30	1× (yellow card) 2× (suspension)	Report	6× (suspension)	CeNARD, Buenos Aires; Attendance: 800; Referees: Geraldello, Marques (BRA)

24 March 2022; 17:00	Argentina	24–22	Brazil	CeNARD, Buenos Aires; Attendance: 1,200; Referees: Araújo, Perdomo (URU)
24 March 2022; 17:00	Lezana 7	(11–11)	Rodrigues 8	CeNARD, Buenos Aires; Attendance: 1,200; Referees: Araújo, Perdomo (URU)
24 March 2022; 17:00		Report	6× (suspension)	CeNARD, Buenos Aires; Attendance: 1,200; Referees: Araújo, Perdomo (URU)

24 March 2022; 19:30	Paraguay	26–26	Uruguay	CeNARD, Buenos Aires; Referees: Corrêa, Corrêa (BRA)
24 March 2022; 19:30	Vergara 7	(12–12)	Golda 6	CeNARD, Buenos Aires; Referees: Corrêa, Corrêa (BRA)
24 March 2022; 19:30	1× (yellow card) 3× (suspension)	Report	2× (suspension)	CeNARD, Buenos Aires; Referees: Corrêa, Corrêa (BRA)

25 March 2022; 17:00	Brazil	28–21	Paraguay	CeNARD, Buenos Aires; Attendance: 120; Referees: Estrada, Pineda (COL)
25 March 2022; 17:00	Rocha 5	(15–10)	Ugarriza, Villalba 5	CeNARD, Buenos Aires; Attendance: 120; Referees: Estrada, Pineda (COL)
25 March 2022; 17:00	1× (yellow card) 7× (suspension)	Report	3× (suspension)	CeNARD, Buenos Aires; Attendance: 120; Referees: Estrada, Pineda (COL)

25 March 2022; 19:30	Chile	25–20	Uruguay	CeNARD, Buenos Aires; Attendance: 100; Referees: Geraldello, Marques (BRA)
25 March 2022; 19:30	Paul 5	(15–9)	Golda 6	CeNARD, Buenos Aires; Attendance: 100; Referees: Geraldello, Marques (BRA)
25 March 2022; 19:30	1× (yellow card) 4× (suspension)	Report	1× (yellow card) 5× (suspension)	CeNARD, Buenos Aires; Attendance: 100; Referees: Geraldello, Marques (BRA)

26 March 2022; 17:00	Brazil	23–19	Chile	CeNARD, Buenos Aires; Referees: Conberse, Correa (ARG)
26 March 2022; 17:00	Bastos 6	(13–10)	Carrasco 4	CeNARD, Buenos Aires; Referees: Conberse, Correa (ARG)
26 March 2022; 17:00	1× (yellow card) 3× (suspension)	Report	3× (yellow card)	CeNARD, Buenos Aires; Referees: Conberse, Correa (ARG)

26 March 2022; 19:30	Argentina	29–23	Paraguay	CeNARD, Buenos Aires; Referees: Araújo, Perdomo (URU)
26 March 2022; 19:30	Frelier 5	(16–12)	Villalba 7	CeNARD, Buenos Aires; Referees: Araújo, Perdomo (URU)
26 March 2022; 19:30	1× (yellow card) 4× (suspension)	Report	1× (yellow card) 3× (suspension)	CeNARD, Buenos Aires; Referees: Araújo, Perdomo (URU)

== Team champion roster ==
2022 South and Central American Women's Junior Champions

Argentina
First title

Team roster: Anna Abalay, Sofia Rivadeneira, Martina Romero, Morena Corvalan, Delfina Ojea, Martina Lang, Oriana Lezana, Dolores Garcia, Carolina Luque, Virginia Catera, Agustina Santamaria, Martina Hoh, Agustina Cattone, Fiorella Malventano, Maria Zanfarana, Berenice Frelier.
Head coach: Hernan Siso.

== See also ==
- South and Central American Women's Handball Championship
