= Camilla Dalby =

Danish handball player (born 1988)

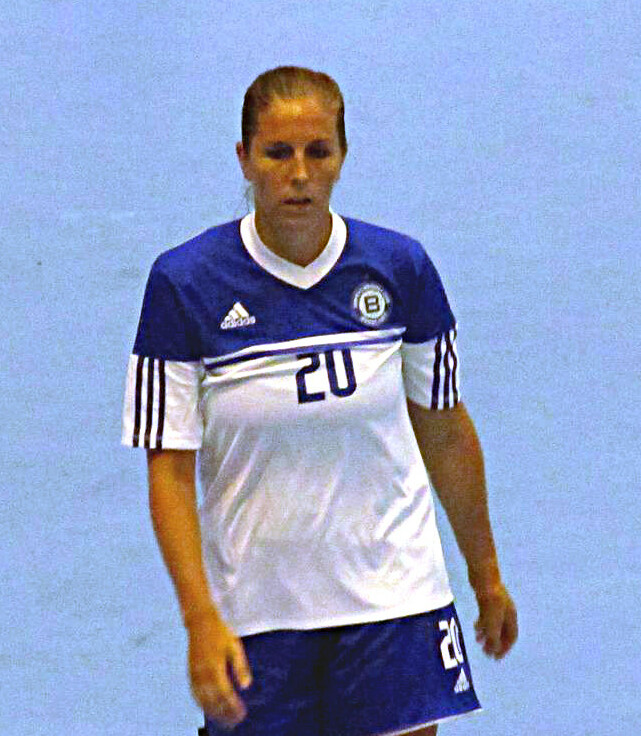

Personal information
- Nationality: Danish
- Born: 15 May 1988 (age 38) Randers, Denmark
- Height: 1.82 m (6 ft 0 in)

Sport
- Sport: Handball
- Position: Right back
- Current club: Retired
- Number: 20

Youth career
- Years: Team
- -: Spentrup IF
- -: Randers Freja

Senior clubs
- Years: Team
- 2010-2013: Randers HK
- 2013-2015: ŽRK Budućnost
- 2015-2019: Randers HK
National team
Years	Team	Apps	(Gls)
2007-2016	Denmark	108	(303)
Medal record
World Championship
Bronze medal – third place	2013 Serbia	Team
IHF Junior World Championship
Silver medal – second place	2008 Macedonia
European Junior Championship
Gold medal – first place	2007 Turkey

Camilla Dalby (born 15 May 1988) is a Danish former team handball player who played the Danish women's national handball team.

== Career ==
Dalby started playing handball at Spentrup IF, before joining Randers Freja and later Randers HK in 2010.

With Randers she came second in the Damehåndboldligaen in 2009 and won the EHF Cup in 2010. In 2012 she won the Danish championship with the club, the first in club history.

In 2013 she joined ŽRK Budućnost on a two-year deal. On 10 May 2015, she won her first Champions League trophy with ŽRK Budućnost. The following season she returned to Randers HK.

In 2018 she missed most of the season due to pregnancy. She made her comeback in 2019, but did not manage to play well and had a hard time adapting to head coach Niels Agesens playing style. She retired in 2019, despite having a contract until 2021.

=== National team ===
She debuted for the Danish national team on 17 October 2007.

At the 2010 European Women's Handball Championship she reached the bronze final and placed fourth with the Danish team.

At the 2013 World Championship, she was a part of the Danish team that won bronze medals, breaking a 9-year streak without medals for the Danish team. They beat Poland 30–26.

== Personal life ==
In October 2017, she announced that she is expecting her first child. She was due in April 2018, meaning she did not play the remainder of the season for Randers HK.

After her handball career she has worked as a physiotherapist.

== Achievements ==
- Champions League:
  - Winner: 2015
  - Finalist: 2014
- EHF Cup
  - Winner: 2010
- Danish Women's Handball League
  - Winner: 2012
  - Second place: 2009
