= Audrey Deroin =

French handball player (born 1989)

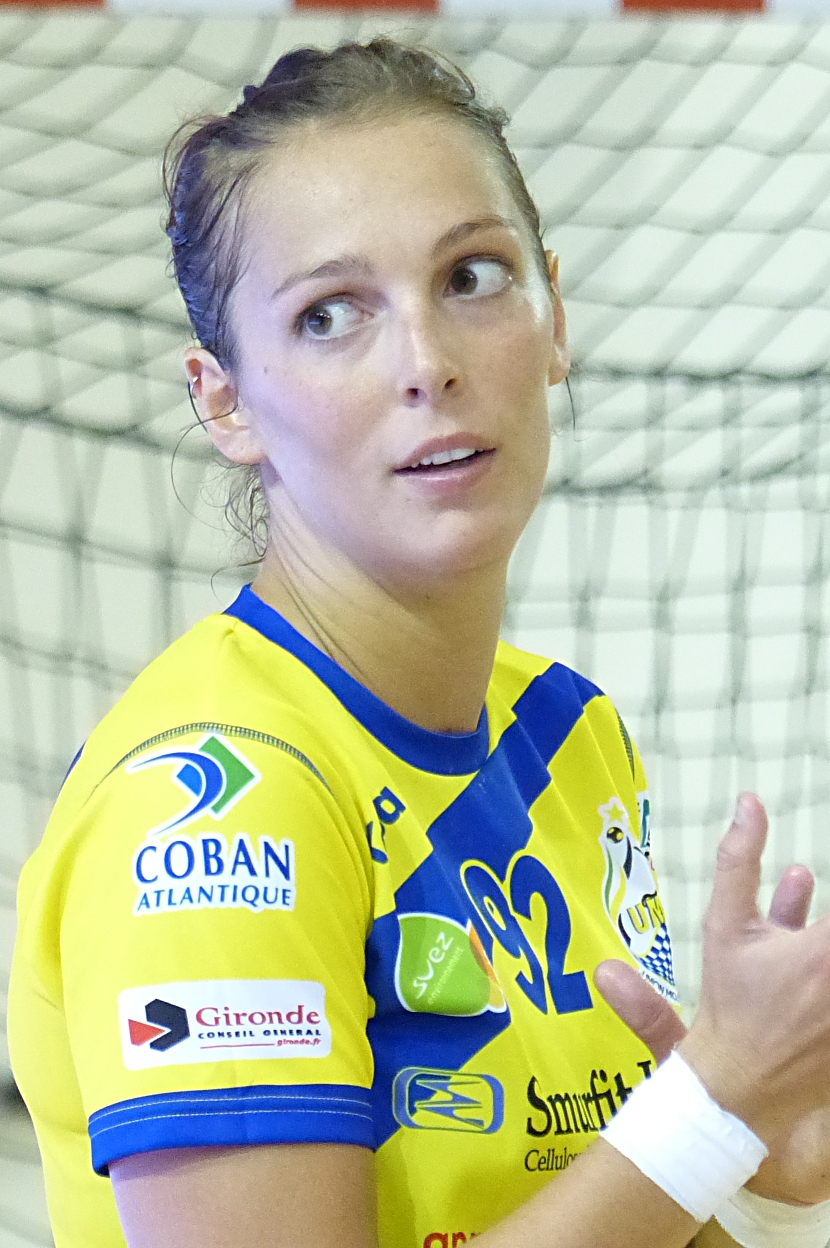

Personal information
- Nationality: French
- Born: 6 September 1989 (age 37) Châtenay-Malabry, France
- Height: 1.76 m (5 ft 9 in)

Sport
- Sport: Handball
- Position: Right wing
- Current club: Thüringer HC
- Number: 92
National team
Years	Team	Apps	(Gls)
–	France	98	(147)
Medal record
World Championship
Silver medal – second place	2009 China	Team
Silver medal – second place	2011 Brazil	Team
Mediterranean Games
Gold medal – first place	2009 Pescara	Team

Audrey Deroin (born 6 September 1989) is a French handball player. She plays for the German club Thüringer HC and for the French national team.

She participated at the 2009 World Women's Handball Championship in China, winning a silver medal with the French team. She repeated this feat two years later in Brazil. She also played for France at the 2012 Summer Olympics.
