= Simona Grozdanovska =

Macedonian handball player

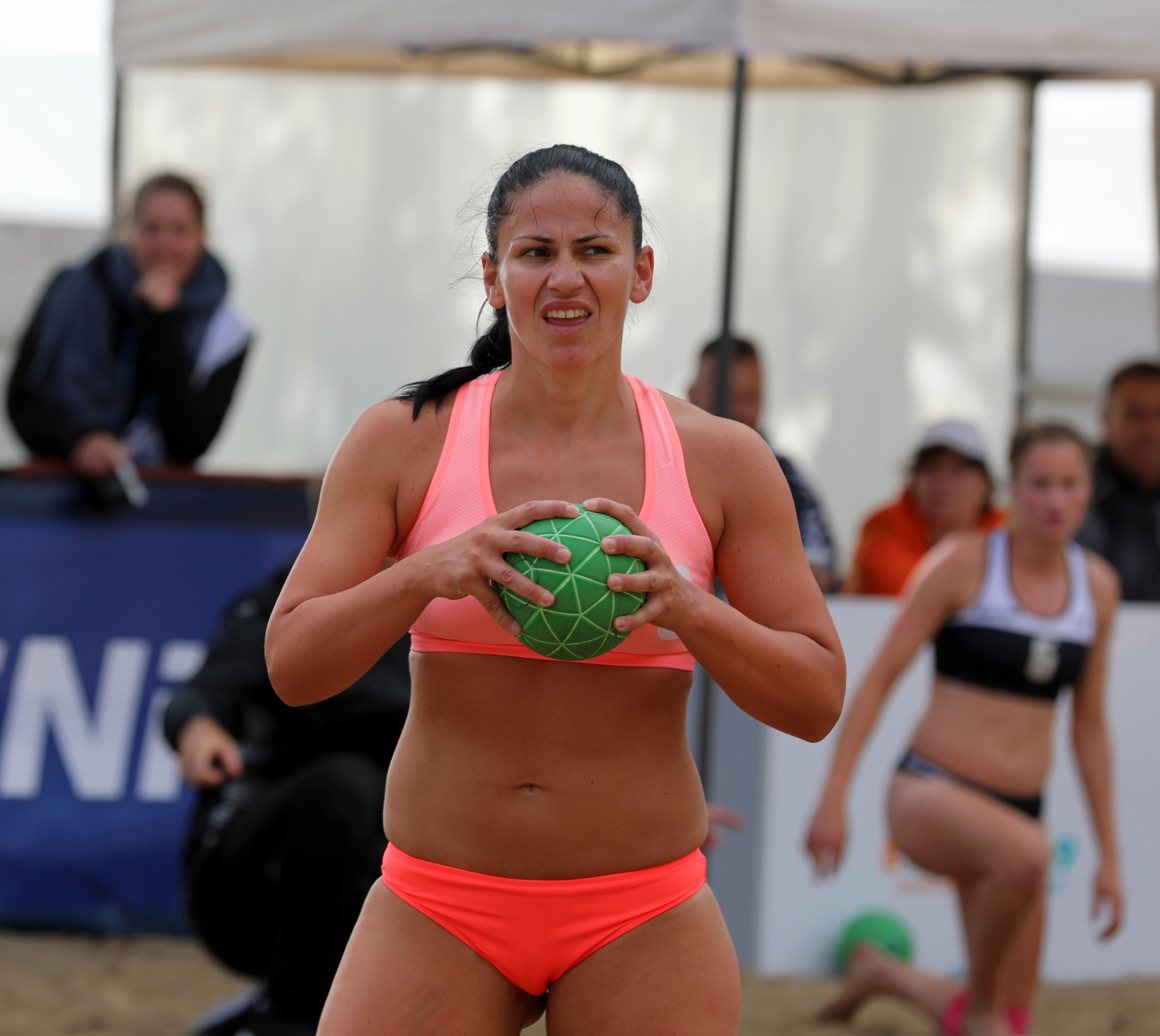

Personal information
- Nationality: Macedonian
- Born: 15 April 1988 (age 38) Resen, North Macedonia
- Height: 1.75 m (5 ft 9 in)

Sport
- Sport: Handball
- Position: Right wing
- Current club: ŽRK Metalurg
- Number: 8

Senior clubs
- Years: Team
- 2003-2005: ŽRK Tutunski Kombinat Prilep
- 2005-2006: RK Kale Kicevo
- 2006-2007: ŽRK Ambalaza Kabran
- 2007-2010: RK Kale Kicevo
- 2010-2014: ŽRK Metalurg
- 2014-2016: PAOK Thessaloniki
- 2016-2017: Artsam Koleji Spor Kulübü
- 2017-2018: Polatlı BSK
- 2018-2019: GC Amicitia Zürich
- 2019-: Yellow Winterthur
National team
Years	Team	Apps	(Gls)
2007-	Macedonia	21	(68)
–	Macedonia Beach		
- Updated on 4 December 2012

Simona Grozdanovska (born 15 April 1988) is a Macedonian handball player for ŽRK Metalurg and the Macedonian national team.

In addition to regular handball, Grozdanovska also plays beach handball.

== Career ==
=== Macedonia ===
Grozdanovska made her senior debut in the Macedonian league already at the age of 15 in 2003 for ŽRK Tutunski Kombinat Prilep. From 2003 to 2005 and from 2007 to 2010 she played for RK Kale Kicevo, interrupted by a season at ŽRK Ambalaza Kabran. In the 2008–2009 season she was the top scorer in the Macedonian league.

This prompted a move to the Macedonian top club ŽRK Metalurg, where she played until 2014. Here she won the Macedonian Championship in 2011 and 2012.

=== Greece ===
In 2014 she joined PAOK Thessaloniki in Greece. Here she was the topscorer in the Greek league in 2016.

=== Turkey ===
The following season she joined Artsam Koleji Spor Kulübü in Turkey, and a year later she joined Polatlı BSK.

=== Switzerland ===
In 2019 she moved to the Swiss team GC Amicitia Zürich. After the team was relegated in 2019 she moved to Yellow Winterthur. In the 2021 she was the top scorer in the top Swiss league with 167 goals in 20 games. Despite her contributions, the club finished second to last and only narrowly avoided relegation. The season after she scored 230 goals, once again enough to be the league top scorer.

=== National team ===
Grozdanovska represented Macedonia at the 2012 European Women's Handball Championship, where Macedonia finished in 16th and last place.

== Beach handball ==
Grozdanovska's first beach handball tournament was the 2007 European Beach Handball Championship, where Macedonia finished 6th. This was enough to secure qualification for the 2008 World Beach Handball Championship as well as the 2009 World Games. Grozdanovska did however not play at any of the tournaments.

After 12 years away from the Beach Handball national team she returned for the 2019 European Beach Handball Championship. With 48 points she was the second best goal scorer for Macedonia at the tournament behind Aleksandra Borizovska. In addition she and North Macedonia also won the fair play-award at the tournament.

== Private ==
Grozdanovska does also possess Bulgarian citizenship.
