= Julie Goiorani =

French handball player (born 1988)

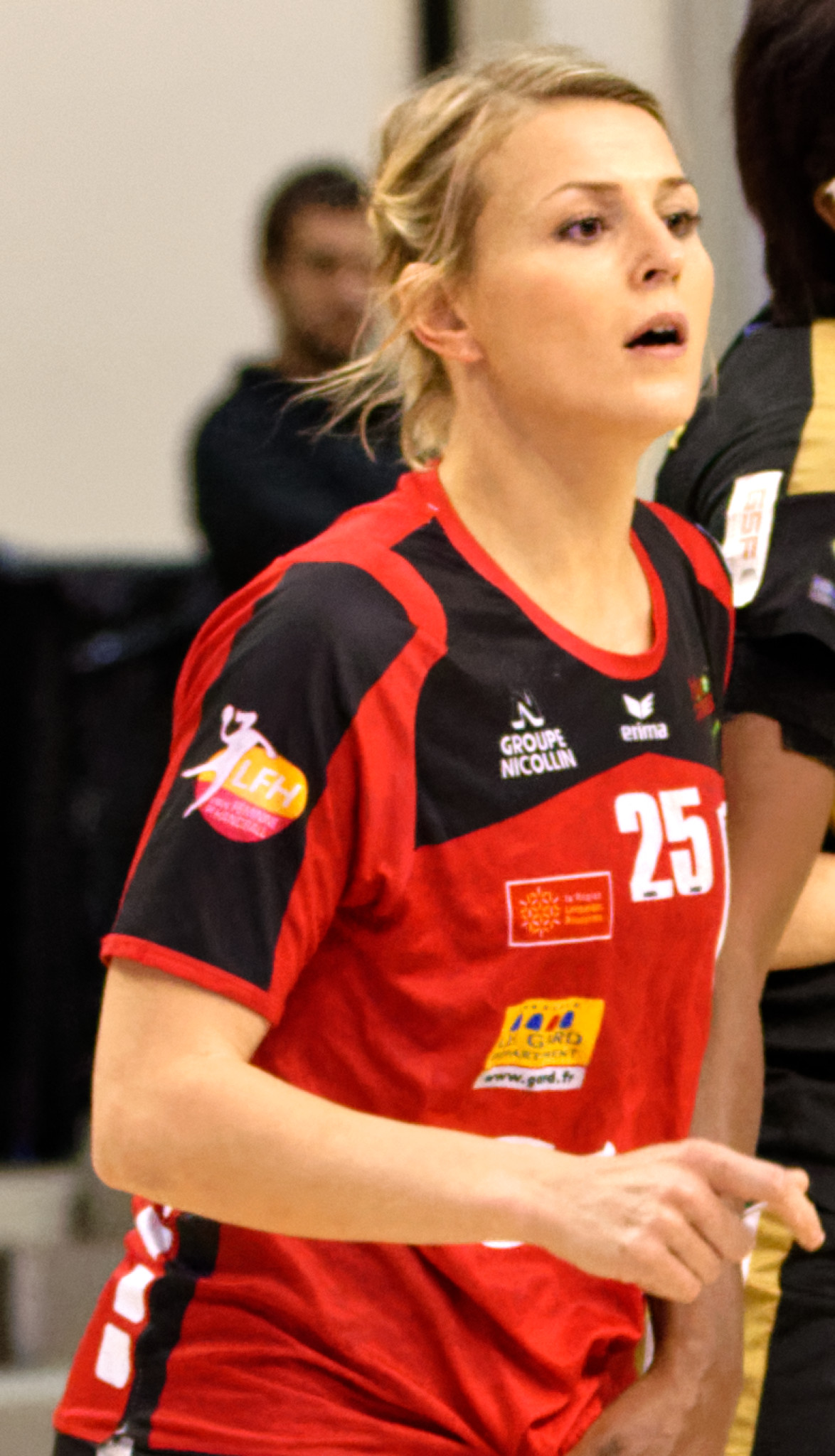

Personal information
- Nationality: French
- Born: 25 May 1988 (age 38) Montpellier, France
- Height: 1.73 m (5 ft 8 in)

Sport
- Sport: Handball
- Position: Pivot
- Current club: retired

Youth career
- Years: Team
- 2001-2003: Cigalois Handball Club
- 2003-2006: HBC Nîmes

Senior clubs
- Years: Team
- 2006-2010: HBC Nîmes
- 2010-2011: Aalborg DH
- 2011-2012: Arvor 29
- 2012-2014: Toulon Handball
- 2014-2016: HBC Nîmes
National team
| Years | Team | Apps | (Gls) |
| 2008-2015 | France | 55 | (52) |

Julie Goiorani (born 25 May 1988) is a French former handball player who played for the French national team.

She played for HBC Nîmes, Arvor 29 and Toulon Handball in France, and Aalborg DH in Denmark.
