= Amel Ait Ahmed =

Algerian handball player (born 1989)

Personal information
- Nationality: Algerian
- Born: 25 September 1989 (age 37)
- Height: 1.82 m (6 ft 0 in)

Sport
- Sport: Handball
- Position: Right wing
- Current club: Saint Étienne
National team
Years	Team	Apps	(Gls)
–	Algeria	70	(85)

Amel Ait Ahmed (born 25 September 1989) is an Algerian team handball player. She plays for the club Elbiar, and on the Algerian national team. She represented Algeria at the 2013 World Women's Handball Championship in Serbia, where the Algerian team placed 22nd.
