= Goiânia Arena =

Gymnasium in Goiânia, Goiás

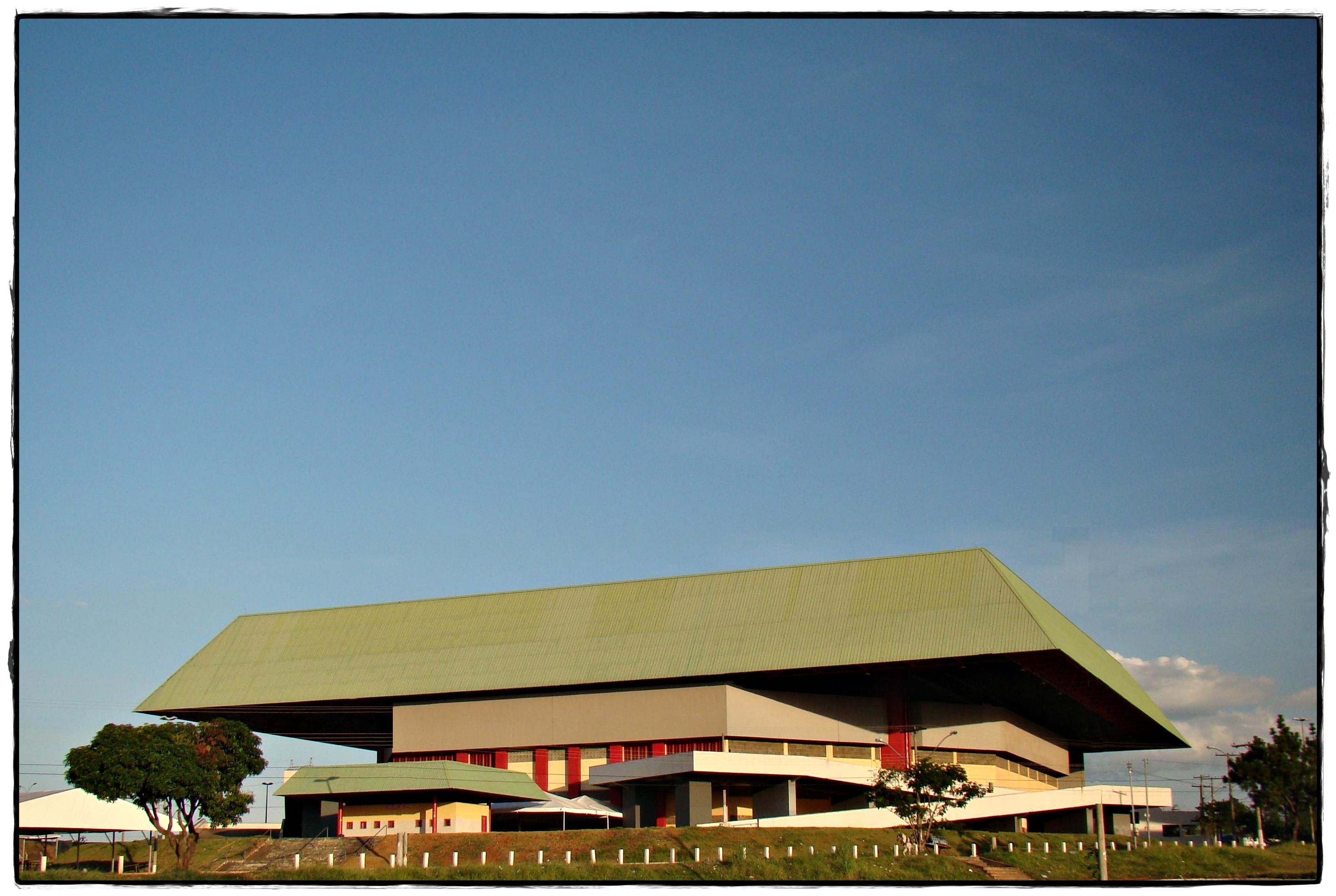
- The exterior of Goiânia Arena.
- Interactive map of Goiânia Arena
- Full name: Goiânia Arena
- Location: Goiânia, Brazil
- Coordinates: 16°41′52″S 49°13′56″W
- Capacity: Concerts: 15,000; Basketball 11,333

Construction
- Opened: 2002

The Goiânia Arena is an indoor sporting multipurpose arena used mostly for volleyball that is located in Goiânia, Brazil. The capacity of the arena is 15,000 spectators for concerts and 11,333 for sports. The arena hosts concerts and indoor sporting events, such as volleyball, basketball, and UFC.

== History ==
Goiânia Arena opened in 2002. The arena hosted a number of senior Brazilian national basketball team games, during their drive to qualify for the 2019 FIBA World Cup. The UFC also held an event here on May 30th 2015.

== See also ==
- List of indoor arenas in Brazil
