= Patrícia Szölösi Sørensen =

Hungarian handball player (born 1991)

Personal information
- Full name: Patrícia Szölösi Sørensen
- Nationality: Hungarian
- Born: 12 April 1991 (age 35) Tatabánya, Hungary
- Height: 1.70 m (5 ft 7 in)

Sport
- Sport: Handball
- Position: Left Wing

Youth career
- Years: Team
- 2005–2007: Győri ETO KC

Senior clubs
- Years: Team
- 2007–2011: Győri ETO KC

Patrícia Szölösi Sørensen (born 12 April 1991 in Tatabánya) is a Hungarian former professional handballer. She retired from professional handball in 2011. First she played in Iceland, currently plays for HØJ Håndbold in Denmark.

== Achievements ==
- Nemzeti Bajnokság I:
  - Winner: 2008, 2009, 2010, 2011
- Magyar Kupa:
  - Winner: 2008, 2009, 2010, 2011
- EHF Champions League:
  - Finalist: 2009
  - Semifinalist: 2008, 2010, 2011
