= Mikako Ishino =

Japanese handball player (born 1988)

Personal information
- Nationality: Japanese
- Born: 11 November 1988 (age 37)
- Height: 1.67 m (5 ft 6 in)

Sport
- Sport: Handball
- Position: Right back
- Current club: Hokkoku Bank
National team
Years	Team	Apps	(Gls)
–	Japan	24	(33)

Mikako Ishino (石野 実加子, Ishino Mikako; born 11 November 1988) is a Japanese handball player who plays for the club Hokkoku Bank. She is also member of the Japanese national team. She competed at the 2015 World Women's Handball Championship in Denmark.
