= SND Arena =

Indoor multi-use sport and event venue in Asunción, Paraguay

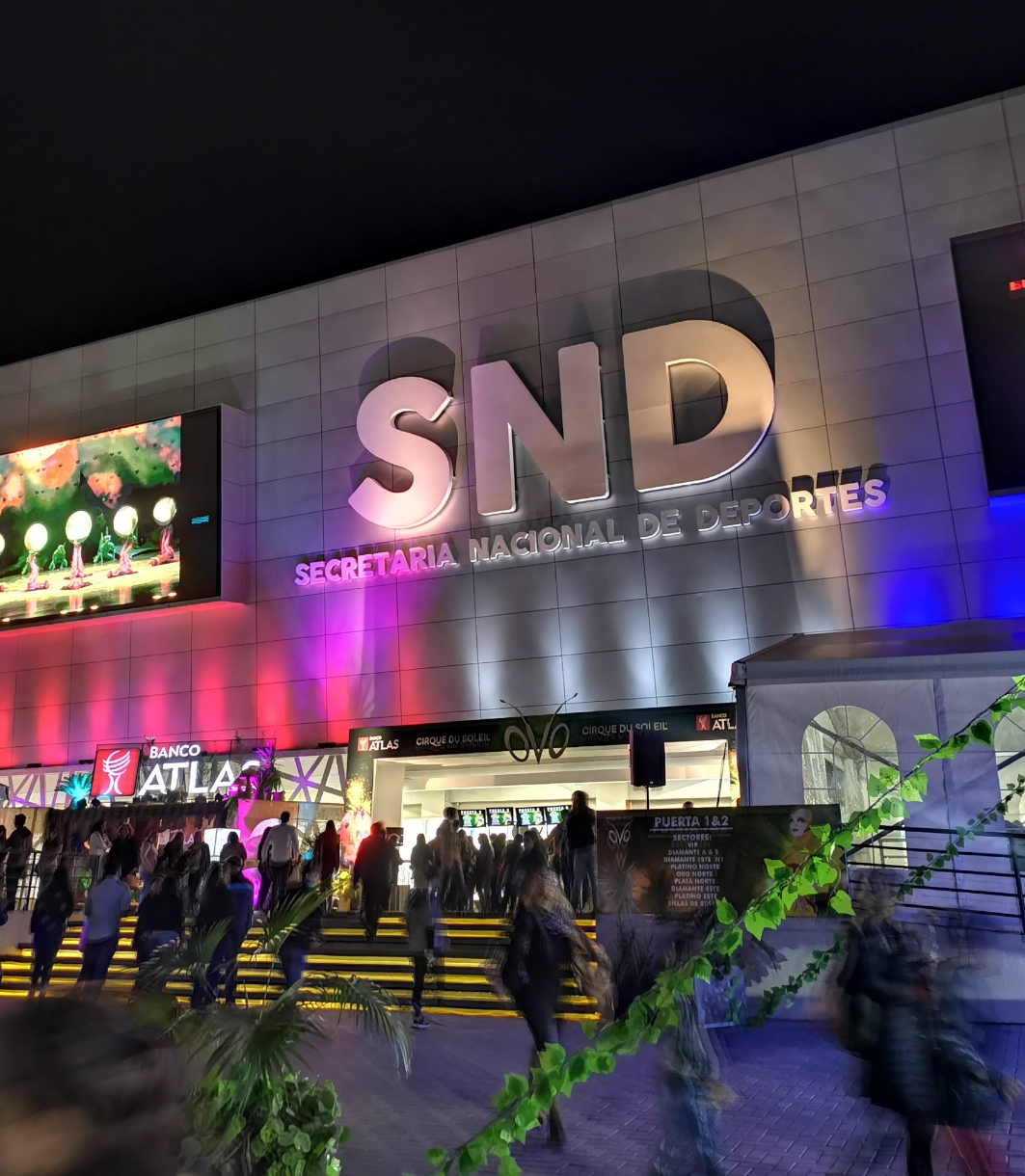
- Interactive map of SND Arena
- Location: Avda. Eusebio Ayala y RI 6 Boquerón, Barrio Hipódromo; Asunción, Paraguay
- Coordinates: 25.3185°S 57.5810°W
- Owner: Secretaria Nacional de Deportes
- Capacity: 5.500
- Type: Stadium
- Events: Sporting Events, Concerts
- Field shape: rectangular

Construction
- Opened: 1978
- Renovated: 10 August 2018
- Expanded: 2018

Website
- www.snd.gov.py

The SND Arena, officially ueno SND Arena for sponsorship reasons, is an indoor multi-use sport and event venue in Asunción, Paraguay, located within the Complejo SND. With its new capacity of 5,500 seats it was renovated and inaugurated in August 2018. It is used mainly for sports events, such as basketball, handball, futsal, volleyball, skating, gymnastics, among others; and also for music concerts. In October 2025 it hosted the largest collective wedding in Paraguayan history with more than 600 couples being married at the same time.

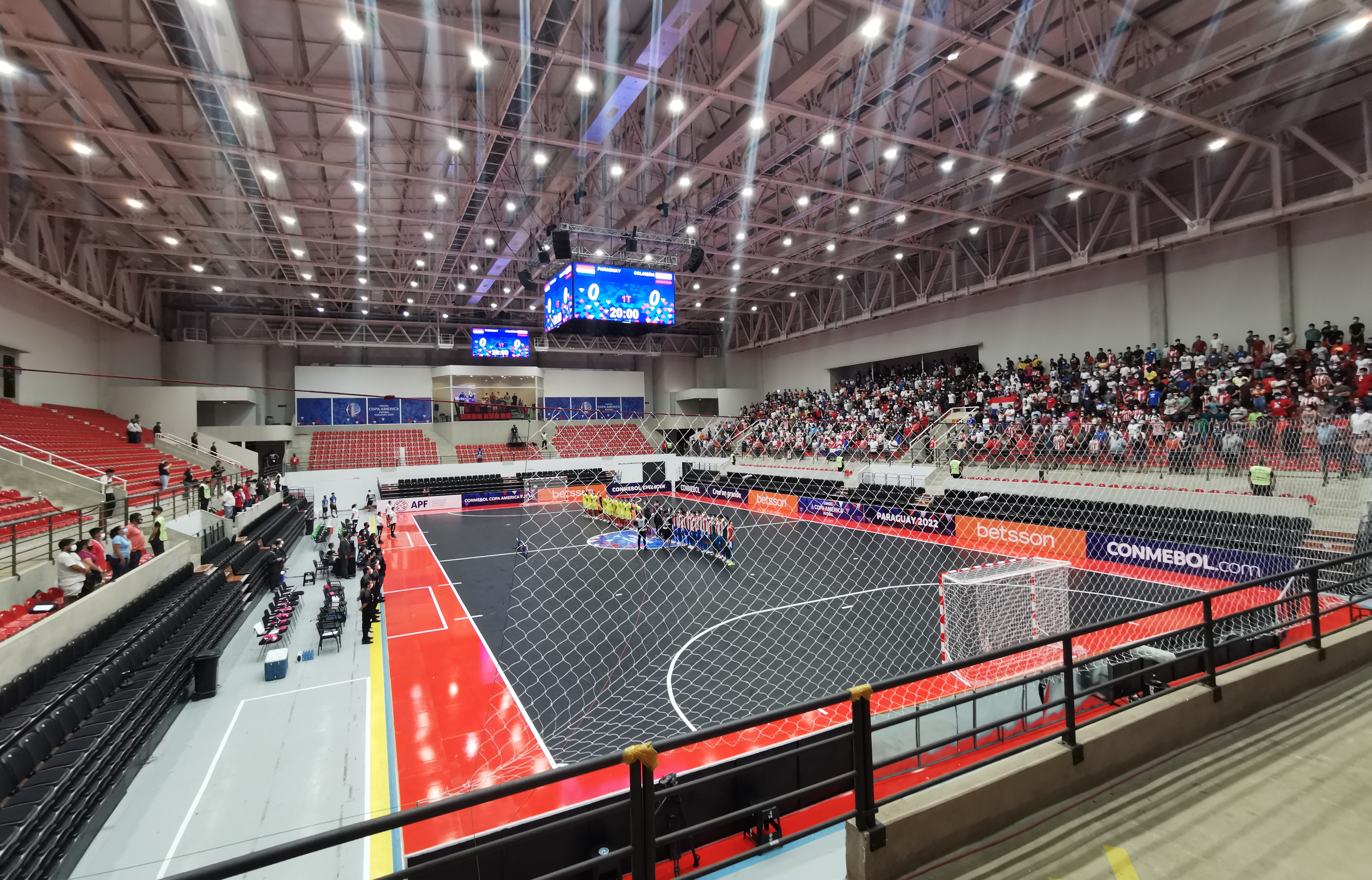
An interior view of SND Arena.

== Sport events ==
Event	Date
2025 FIBA AmeriCup qualification (Paraguay basketball team matches)	February - November, 2024
2023 WPT Paraguay Open	March 21 - 26, 2023
2022 South American Games (Artistic Skating)	October 1 - October 15, 2022
2022 Copa América de Futsal	January 29 - February 6, 2022
2021 Artistic Skating World Championships	September 29 - October 9, 2021

== Concerts ==
Country	Artist	Date
(Argentina)	Andrés Calamaro	October 27, 2024
(Uruguay)	No Te Va Gustar	October 26, 2024
(Spain)	Abraham Mateo	October 24, 2024
(Argentina)	Airbag	August 3, 2024
(Uruguay)	El Cuarteto de Nos	June 15, 2024
(Mexico)	Ana Gabriel	June 11, 2024
(Chile)	Myriam Hernández	February 9, 2024
(United States)	Marc Anthony	December 16, 2023
(Argentina)	Floricienta	December 2, 2023
(Colombia)	Juanes	November 2, 2023
(Venezuela)	Danny Ocean	September 14, 2023
(Uruguay)	Lucas Sugo	September 8, 2023
(Argentina)	Soledad Pastorutti	August 26, 2023
(Uruguay)	La Vela Puerca	August 19, 2023
(Brazil)	Zezé di Camargo & Luciano	May 20, 2023
(Argentina)	Rata Blanca	May 18, 2023
(Colombia)	Manuel Turizo	May 5, 2023
(Argentina)	WOS	April 22, 2023
(Argentina)	Fito Páez	April 20, 2023
(Colombia)	Camilo	March 7, 2023
(Mexico)	Alejandro Fernández	February 27, 2023
(Mexico)	Sin Bandera	February 11, 2023
(Argentina)	Luciano Pereyra	December 3, 2022
(Argentina)	Andrés Calamaro	December 1, 2022
(Colombia)	Sebastián Yatra	August 7, 2022
(Argentina)	Tiago PZK	August 6, 2022
(Uruguay)	No Te Va Gustar	July 23, 2022
(Argentina)	Don Osvaldo	July 9, 2022
(United Kingdom)	Louis Tomlinson	May 19, 2022
(Argentina)	Soda Stereo	May 13, 2022
(Uruguay)	Jorge Drexler	May 11, 2022
(Norway)	A-ha	March 27, 2022
(Spain)	Alejandro Sanz	February 16, 2020
(Argentina)	Tini	December 10, 2019
(Spain)	Serrat & Sabina	November 16, 2019
(Colombia)	Morat	September 28, 2019
(Venezuela)	Ricardo Montaner	June 22, 2019
(France) (Spain) (United States) (Switzerland)	Il Divo	May 25, 2019
(Brazil)	Roberto Carlos	May 8, 2019
(Mexico)	Karol Sevilla	December 8, 2018

== Notes ==
1.Canceled as responds to the COVID-19 pandemic.
