= Argentina women's national junior handball team =

Argentina

Information
- Association: Argentina Handball Federation
- Coach: Martin Duhau

Colours
| 1st | 2nd |

Results

IHF U-20 World Championship
- Appearances: 11 (First in 1995)
- Best result: 12th place (2008)
- Last updated on Unknown.

The Argentina women's junior national handball team is the national under-19 handball team of Argentina. Controlled by the Argentina Handball Federation that is an affiliate of the International Handball Federation and also a part of the South and Central America Handball Confederation, the team represents the country in international matches.

== Results ==
=== World Championship ===
Champions Runners up Third place Fourth place

| Year | Round | Position | GP | W | D | L | GS | GA | GD |
|---|---|---|---|---|---|---|---|---|---|
| 1977 (Romania) | Didn't Qualify | | | | | | | | |
| 1979 (Socialist Federal Republic of Yugoslavia) | Didn't Qualify | | | | | | | | |
| 1981 (Canada) | Didn't Qualify | | | | | | | | |
| 1983 (France) | Didn't Qualify | | | | | | | | |
| 1985 (South Korea) | Didn't Qualify | | | | | | | | |
| 1987 (Denmark) | Didn't Qualify | | | | | | | | |
| 1989 (Nigeria) | Didn't Qualify | | | | | | | | |
| 1991 (France) | Didn't Qualify | | | | | | | | |
| 1993 (Bulgaria) | Didn't Qualify | | | | | | | | |
| 1995 (Brazil) | | 17th place | | | | | | | |
| 1997 (Ivory Coast) | Didn't Qualify | | | | | | | | |
| 1999 (China) | Didn't Qualify | | | | | | | | |
| 2001 (Hungary) | | 16th place | | | | | | | |
| 2003 (North Macedonia) | Didn't Qualify | | | | | | | | |
| 2005 (Czech Republic) | | 20th place | | | | | | | |
| 2008 (North Macedonia) | | 12th place | | | | | | | |
| 2010 (South Korea) | | 15th place | | | | | | | |
| 2012 (Czech Republic) | | 20th place | | | | | | | |
| 2014 (Croatia) | | 20th place | | | | | | | |
| 2016 (Russia) | | 16th place | | | | | | | |
| 2018 (Hungary) | Didn't Qualify | | | | | | | | |
| 2022 (Slovenia) | | 25th place | | | | | | | |
| 2024 (North Macedonia) | | 21st place | | | | | | | |
| 2026 (China) | | 21st place | | | | | | | |
| Total | 10/24 | 0 Titles | | | | | | | |

=== South and Central American Championship ===
| Year | Round | Position | GP | W | D | L | GS | GA | GD |
|---|---|---|---|---|---|---|---|---|---|
| 2022 (Argentina) | round robin | 1st place | 4 | 4 | 0 | 0 | 121 | 83 | +38 |
| 2023 (Argentina) | final | 1st place | 5 | 5 | 0 | 0 | 174 | 69 | +105 |
| Total | 2/2 | 2 Titles | 9 | 9 | 0 | 0 | 295 | 152 | +143 |

=== Pan American Games ===
| Year | Round | Position | GP | W | D | L | GS | GA | GD |
|---|---|---|---|---|---|---|---|---|---|
| 2021 Cali (Colombia) | gold medal match | (gold) Gold medal winners | 5 | 4 | 1 | 0 | 148 | 106 | +42 |
| 2025 Asuncion (Paraguay) | gold medal match | (silver) Silver medal winners | 5 | 3 | 0 | 2 | 131 | 91 | +40 |
