= Brazil women's national junior handball team =

Brazilian Junior Handball Team

Brazil

Information
- Association: Brazil Handball Federation
- Coach: Marlon Aguiar

Colours
1st	2nd

Results

IHF U-20 World Championship
- Appearances: 17 (First in 1991)
- Best result: 9th (2005, 2008)
- Last updated on Unknown.

The Brazil women's junior national handball team is the national under-19 handball team of Brazil. Controlled by the Brazil Handball Federation that is an affiliate of the International Handball Federation IHF and also a part of the South and Central America Handball Confederation SCAHC. The team represents the country in international matches.

== Results ==
=== World Championship ===
Champions Runners up Third place Fourth place

Year	Round	Position	GP	W	D	L	GS	GA	GD
1977 (Romania)	Didn't Qualify								
1979 (Socialist Federal Republic of Yugoslavia)	Didn't Qualify								
1981 (Canada)	Didn't Qualify								
1983 (France)	Didn't Qualify								
1985 (South Korea)	Didn't Qualify								
1987 (Denmark)	Didn't Qualify								
1989 (Nigeria)	Didn't Qualify								
1991 (France)		15th place							
1993 (Bulgaria)		13th place							
1995 (Brazil)		13th place							
1997 (Ivory Coast)		12th place							
1999 (China)		12th place							
2001 (Hungary)		13th place							
2003 (North Macedonia)		15th place							
2005 (Czech Republic)		9th place							
2008 (North Macedonia)		9th place							
2010 (South Korea)		12th place							
2012 (Czech Republic)		12th place							
2014 (Croatia)		15th place							
2016 (Russia)		11th place							
2018 (Hungary)		11th place							
2022 (Slovenia)		22nd place							
2024 (North Macedonia)		19th place							
2026 (China)		20th place							
Total	17/24	0 Titles							

=== South and Central American Championship ===
Year	Round	Position	GP	W	D	L	GS	GA	GD
2022 (Argentina)	round robin	2nd place	4	3	0	1	109	81	+28
2023 (Argentina)	final	2nd place	5	4	0	1	161	106	+55
Total	2/2	0 Titles	9	7	0	2	270	187	+83
