= Paraguay women's national junior handball team =

Paraguay

Information
- Association: Confederacion Paraguaya de Handball
- Coach: Wilson Alfonso

Colours
| 1st | 2nd |

Results

IHF U-20 World Championship
- Appearances: 2 (First in 2018)
- Best result: 22nd (2018)
- Last updated on Unknown.

The Paraguay women's junior national handball team is the national under-19 handball team of Paraguay. Controlled by the Confederacion Paraguaya de Handball it represents the country in international matches.

== World Championship record ==
- 2018 – 22nd place
- 2026 – 26th place
