= 2019 Asian Women's Junior Handball Championship =

2019 handball championship in Asia

Tournament details
- Host country: Lebanon
- Venue: 1 (in 1 host city)
- Dates: 20–29 July
- Teams: 8 (from 1 confederation)

Final positions
- Champions: South Korea (15th title)
- Runners-up: Japan
- Third place: China
- Fourth place: Lebanon

Tournament statistics
- Matches played: 20
- Goals scored: 1,159 (57.95 per match)
- Top scorer(s): (Uzbekistan) Madina Khudoykulova (Kazakhstan) Alessya Malysheva (47 goals)

The 2019 Asian Women's Junior Handball Championship was the 15th edition of the championship held from 20 to 29 July 2019 at Beirut, Lebanon under the aegis of Asian Handball Federation. It was the first time in history that championship was organised in Lebanon by the Lebanese Handball Federation. It also acted as the qualification tournament for the 2020 Women's Junior World Handball Championship.

== Draw ==
The draw was held on 13 April 2019 at Lebanese Handball Federation Headquarters in Beirut, Lebanon.

== Preliminary round ==
All times are local (UTC+3).

=== Group A ===
Pos	Team	Pld	W	D	L	GF	GA	GD	Pts	Qualification
1	South Korea	3	3	0	0	110	59	+51	6	Semifinals
2	China	3	2	0	1	94	73	+21	4	Semifinals
3	Chinese Taipei	3	1	0	2	64	88	−24	2	5–8th place semifinals
4	Kazakhstan	2	0	0	2	65	113	−48	0	5–8th place semifinals

Source: AHF
Rules for classification: 1) Points; 2) Head-to-head points; 3) Head-to-head goal difference; 4) Head-to-head goals scored; 5) Goal difference; 6) Goals scored; 7) Draw.

21 July 2019; 17:00	China	38–23	Kazakhstan	Hatem Achour Hall, Beirut
21 July 2019; 17:00		(20–12)		Hatem Achour Hall, Beirut

21 July 2019; 19:00	South Korea	31–18	Chinese Taipei	Hatem Achour Hall, Beirut
21 July 2019; 19:00		(14–11)		Hatem Achour Hall, Beirut

23 July 2019; 17:00	Chinese Taipei	15–33	China	Hatem Achour Hall, Beirut
23 July 2019; 17:00		(10–15)		Hatem Achour Hall, Beirut

23 July 2019; 19:00	Kazakhstan	18–44	South Korea	Hatem Achour Hall, Beirut
23 July 2019; 19:00		(5–25)		Hatem Achour Hall, Beirut

25 July 2019; 17:00	Kazakhstan	24–31	Chinese Taipei	Hatem Achour Hall, Beirut
25 July 2019; 17:00		(13–15)		Hatem Achour Hall, Beirut

25 July 2019; 19:00	South Korea	35–23	China	Hatem Achour Hall, Beirut
25 July 2019; 19:00		(16–12)		Hatem Achour Hall, Beirut

=== Group B ===
Pos	Team	Pld	W	D	L	GF	GA	GD	Pts	Qualification
1	Japan	3	3	0	0	109	66	+43	6	Semifinals
2	Lebanon (H)	3	1	1	1	85	83	+2	3	Semifinals
3	Uzbekistan	3	1	1	1	87	93	−6	3	5–8th place semifinals
4	India	3	0	0	3	76	115	−39	0	5–8th place semifinals

Source: AHF
Rules for classification: 1) Points; 2) Head-to-head points; 3) Head-to-head goal difference; 4) Head-to-head goals scored; 5) Goal difference; 6) Goals scored; 7) Draw.
(H) Hosts

20 July 2019; 17:00	Japan	38–24	Uzbekistan	Hatem Achour Hall, Beirut
20 July 2019; 17:00		(18–11)		Hatem Achour Hall, Beirut

20 July 2019; 19:00	Lebanon	37–27	India	Hatem Achour Hall, Beirut
20 July 2019; 19:00		(18–17)		Hatem Achour Hall, Beirut

22 July 2019; 17:00	India	19–40	Japan	Hatem Achour Hall, Beirut
22 July 2019; 17:00		(10–18)		Hatem Achour Hall, Beirut

22 July 2019; 19:00	Uzbekistan	25–25	Lebanon	Hatem Achour Hall, Beirut
22 July 2019; 19:00		(11–14)		Hatem Achour Hall, Beirut

24 July 2019; 17:00	Uzbekistan	38–30	India	Hatem Achour Hall, Beirut
24 July 2019; 17:00		(16–16)		Hatem Achour Hall, Beirut

24 July 2019; 19:00	Lebanon	23–31	Japan	Hatem Achour Hall, Beirut
24 July 2019; 19:00		(10–17)		Hatem Achour Hall, Beirut

== Knockout stage ==
=== Bracket ===
Semifinals
27 July
Japan	26
China	21
27 July
South Korea	38
Lebanon	16

Final
29 July
Japan	19
South Korea	26
Third place
29 July
China	34
Lebanon	17

5–8th place bracket

5–8th place semifinals
26 July
Chinese Taipei	35
India	30
26 July
Uzbekistan	33
Kazakhstan	35

Fifth place
28 July
India	24
Uzbekistan	48
Seventh place
28 July
Chinese Taipei	34
Kazakhstan	33

=== 5–8th place semifinals ===
27 July 2019; 13:00	Chinese Taipei	35–30	India	Hatem Achour Hall, Beirut
27 July 2019; 13:00		(16–15)		Hatem Achour Hall, Beirut

27 July 2019; 15:00	Uzbekistan	33–35	Kazakhstan	Hatem Achour Hall, Beirut
27 July 2019; 15:00		(15–15)		Hatem Achour Hall, Beirut

=== Semifinals ===
27 July 2019; 17:00	Japan	26–21	China	Hatem Achour Hall, Beirut
27 July 2019; 17:00		(14–10)		Hatem Achour Hall, Beirut

27 July 2019; 19:00	South Korea	38–16	Lebanon	Hatem Achour Hall, Beirut
27 July 2019; 19:00		(17–7)		Hatem Achour Hall, Beirut

=== Seventh place game ===
28 July 2019; 17:00	India	24–48	Uzbekistan	Hatem Achour Hall, Beirut
28 July 2019; 17:00		(11–22)		Hatem Achour Hall, Beirut

=== Fifth place game ===
28 July 2019; 19:00	Chinese Taipei	34–33	Kazakhstan	Hatem Achour Hall, Beirut
28 July 2019; 19:00		(13–10)		Hatem Achour Hall, Beirut

=== Third place game ===
29 July 2019; 17:00	China	34–17	Lebanon	Hatem Achour Hall, Beirut
29 July 2019; 17:00		(16–7)		Hatem Achour Hall, Beirut

=== Final ===
29 July 2019; 19:00	Japan	19–26	South Korea	Hatem Achour Hall, Beirut
29 July 2019; 19:00		(11–16)		Hatem Achour Hall, Beirut

== Final standings ==
Rank	Team
1st place, gold medalist(s)	South Korea
2nd place, silver medalist(s)	Japan
3rd place, bronze medalist(s)	China
4	Lebanon
5	Chinese Taipei
6	Kazakhstan
7	Uzbekistan
8	India

Team qualified for the 2020 Junior World Championship
