= 2023 Asian Women's Junior Handball Championship =

Tournament details
- Host country: Hong Kong
- Venue: 1 (in 1 host city)
- Dates: 30 June – 9 July
- Teams: 10 (from 1 confederation)

Final positions
- Champions: South Korea (16th title)
- Runners-up: China
- Third place: Japan
- Fourth place: Chinese Taipei

Tournament statistics
- Matches played: 29
- Goals scored: 1,681 (57.97 per match)

Awards
- Best player: (South Korea) Kim Min-seo

The 2023 Asian Women's Junior Handball Championship was the 17th edition of the championship held from 30 June to 9 July 2023 at the Kowloon Park Sports Centre, Tsim Sha Tsui, Hong Kong under the aegis of Asian Handball Federation. It was the second time in history that championship was organised by the Handball Association of Hong Kong, China. It also acted as the qualification tournament for the 2024 Women's Junior World Handball Championship.

== Draw ==
The draw was held on 3 February 2023 at the Olympic House, Hong Kong.

=== Seeding ===
Teams were seeded according to the AHF COC regulations and rankings of the previous edition of the championship. Teams who did not participate in the previous edition were in Pot 4.

Pot 1	Pot 2	Pot 3	Pot 4
Hong Kong; India	Iran; Kazakhstan	Uzbekistan	China; Chinese Taipei; Japan; Kuwait; South Korea

== Preliminary round ==
All times are local (UTC+8).

=== Group A ===
Pos	Team	Pld	W	D	L	GF	GA	GD	Pts	Qualification
1	South Korea	4	4	0	0	160	78	+82	8	Semifinals
2	Japan	4	3	0	1	174	79	+95	6	Semifinals
3	Kazakhstan	4	2	0	2	120	108	+12	4	5–8th place semifinals
4	Hong Kong (H)	4	1	0	3	65	137	−72	2	5–8th place semifinals
5	Kuwait	4	0	0	4	38	155	−117	0	Ninth place game

Source: AHF
Rules for classification: 1) Points; 2) Head-to-head points; 3) Head-to-head goal difference; 4) Head-to-head goals scored; 5) Goal difference; 6) Goals scored; 7) Draw.
(H) Hosts

30 June 2023; 14:00	Japan	43–29	Kazakhstan	Kowloon Park Sports Centre, Tsim Sha Tsui
30 June 2023; 14:00		(23–13)		Kowloon Park Sports Centre, Tsim Sha Tsui
30 June 2023; 14:00		Report		Kowloon Park Sports Centre, Tsim Sha Tsui

30 June 2023; 17:30	South Korea	46–9	Hong Kong	Kowloon Park Sports Centre, Tsim Sha Tsui
30 June 2023; 17:30		(26–4)		Kowloon Park Sports Centre, Tsim Sha Tsui
30 June 2023; 17:30		Report		Kowloon Park Sports Centre, Tsim Sha Tsui

1 July 2023; 12:00	Kuwait	4–33	Kazakhstan	Kowloon Park Sports Centre, Tsim Sha Tsui
1 July 2023; 12:00		(2–14)		Kowloon Park Sports Centre, Tsim Sha Tsui
1 July 2023; 12:00		Report		Kowloon Park Sports Centre, Tsim Sha Tsui

1 July 2023; 16:00	Japan	46–8	Hong Kong	Kowloon Park Sports Centre, Tsim Sha Tsui
1 July 2023; 16:00		(19–5)		Kowloon Park Sports Centre, Tsim Sha Tsui
1 July 2023; 16:00		Report		Kowloon Park Sports Centre, Tsim Sha Tsui

2 July 2023; 12:00	Japan	55–7	Kuwait	Kowloon Park Sports Centre, Tsim Sha Tsui
2 July 2023; 12:00		(26–3)		Kowloon Park Sports Centre, Tsim Sha Tsui
2 July 2023; 12:00		Report		Kowloon Park Sports Centre, Tsim Sha Tsui

2 July 2023; 18:00	Kazakhstan	26–44	South Korea	Kowloon Park Sports Centre, Tsim Sha Tsui
2 July 2023; 18:00		(11–26)		Kowloon Park Sports Centre, Tsim Sha Tsui
2 July 2023; 18:00		Report		Kowloon Park Sports Centre, Tsim Sha Tsui

4 July 2023; 16:00	Kuwait	13–31	Hong Kong	Kowloon Park Sports Centre, Tsim Sha Tsui
4 July 2023; 16:00		(8–16)		Kowloon Park Sports Centre, Tsim Sha Tsui
4 July 2023; 16:00		Report		Kowloon Park Sports Centre, Tsim Sha Tsui

4 July 2023; 18:00	South Korea	34–30	Japan	Kowloon Park Sports Centre, Tsim Sha Tsui
4 July 2023; 18:00		(19–17)		Kowloon Park Sports Centre, Tsim Sha Tsui
4 July 2023; 18:00		Report		Kowloon Park Sports Centre, Tsim Sha Tsui

5 July 2023; 16:00	South Korea	36–14	Kuwait	Kowloon Park Sports Centre, Tsim Sha Tsui
5 July 2023; 16:00		(23–5)		Kowloon Park Sports Centre, Tsim Sha Tsui
5 July 2023; 16:00		Report		Kowloon Park Sports Centre, Tsim Sha Tsui

5 July 2023; 18:00	Hong Kong	17–32	Kazakhstan	Kowloon Park Sports Centre, Tsim Sha Tsui
5 July 2023; 18:00		(8–13)		Kowloon Park Sports Centre, Tsim Sha Tsui
5 July 2023; 18:00		Report		Kowloon Park Sports Centre, Tsim Sha Tsui

=== Group B ===
Pos	Team	Pld	W	D	L	GF	GA	GD	Pts	Qualification
1	China	4	4	0	0	130	87	+43	8	Semifinals
2	Chinese Taipei	4	2	1	1	104	104	0	5	Semifinals
3	Iran	4	2	0	2	117	124	−7	4	5–8th place semifinals
4	Uzbekistan	4	1	1	2	135	143	−8	3	5–8th place semifinals
5	India	4	0	0	4	105	133	−28	0	Ninth place game

Source: AHF
Rules for classification: 1) Points; 2) Head-to-head points; 3) Head-to-head goal difference; 4) Head-to-head goals scored; 5) Goal difference; 6) Goals scored; 7) Draw.

30 June 2023; 10:00	Chinese Taipei	25–22	India	Kowloon Park Sports Centre, Tsim Sha Tsui
30 June 2023; 10:00		(11–7)		Kowloon Park Sports Centre, Tsim Sha Tsui
30 June 2023; 10:00		Report		Kowloon Park Sports Centre, Tsim Sha Tsui

30 June 2023; 12:00	China	29–23	Iran	Kowloon Park Sports Centre, Tsim Sha Tsui
30 June 2023; 12:00		(13–11)		Kowloon Park Sports Centre, Tsim Sha Tsui
30 June 2023; 12:00		Report		Kowloon Park Sports Centre, Tsim Sha Tsui

1 July 2023; 14:00	Uzbekistan	36–37	Iran	Kowloon Park Sports Centre, Tsim Sha Tsui
1 July 2023; 14:00		(15–18)		Kowloon Park Sports Centre, Tsim Sha Tsui
1 July 2023; 14:00		Report		Kowloon Park Sports Centre, Tsim Sha Tsui

1 July 2023; 18:00	China	35–22	India	Kowloon Park Sports Centre, Tsim Sha Tsui
1 July 2023; 18:00		(14–9)		Kowloon Park Sports Centre, Tsim Sha Tsui
1 July 2023; 18:00		Report		Kowloon Park Sports Centre, Tsim Sha Tsui

2 July 2023; 14:00	China	39–28	Uzbekistan	Kowloon Park Sports Centre, Tsim Sha Tsui
2 July 2023; 14:00		(20–10)		Kowloon Park Sports Centre, Tsim Sha Tsui
2 July 2023; 14:00		Report		Kowloon Park Sports Centre, Tsim Sha Tsui

2 July 2023; 16:00	Iran	18–28	Chinese Taipei	Kowloon Park Sports Centre, Tsim Sha Tsui
2 July 2023; 16:00		(8–15)		Kowloon Park Sports Centre, Tsim Sha Tsui
2 July 2023; 16:00		Report		Kowloon Park Sports Centre, Tsim Sha Tsui

4 July 2023; 12:00	Uzbekistan	34–30	India	Kowloon Park Sports Centre, Tsim Sha Tsui
4 July 2023; 12:00		(15–11)		Kowloon Park Sports Centre, Tsim Sha Tsui
4 July 2023; 12:00		Report		Kowloon Park Sports Centre, Tsim Sha Tsui

4 July 2023; 14:00	Chinese Taipei	14–27	China	Kowloon Park Sports Centre, Tsim Sha Tsui
4 July 2023; 14:00		(5–13)		Kowloon Park Sports Centre, Tsim Sha Tsui
4 July 2023; 14:00		Report		Kowloon Park Sports Centre, Tsim Sha Tsui

5 July 2023; 12:00	Chinese Taipei	37–37	Uzbekistan	Kowloon Park Sports Centre, Tsim Sha Tsui
5 July 2023; 12:00		(19–20)		Kowloon Park Sports Centre, Tsim Sha Tsui
5 July 2023; 12:00		Report		Kowloon Park Sports Centre, Tsim Sha Tsui

5 July 2023; 14:00	India	31–39	Iran	Kowloon Park Sports Centre, Tsim Sha Tsui
5 July 2023; 14:00		(13–14)		Kowloon Park Sports Centre, Tsim Sha Tsui
5 July 2023; 14:00		Report		Kowloon Park Sports Centre, Tsim Sha Tsui

== Knockout stage ==
=== Bracket ===
Semifinals
7 July
South Korea	41
Chinese Taipei	20
7 July
China	28
Japan	27

Final
9 July
South Korea	34
China	15
Third place
9 July
Chinese Taipei	23
Japan	43

5–8th place semifinals
7 July
Kazakhstan	34
Uzbekistan	28
7 July
Iran	45
Hong Kong	16

Fifth place
8 July
Kazakhstan	24
Iran	27
Seventh place
8 July
Uzbekistan	44
Hong Kong	23

=== 5–8th place semifinals ===
7 July 2023; 12:00	Kazakhstan	34–28	Uzbekistan	Kowloon Park Sports Centre, Tsim Sha Tsui
7 July 2023; 12:00		(21–19)		Kowloon Park Sports Centre, Tsim Sha Tsui
7 July 2023; 12:00		Report		Kowloon Park Sports Centre, Tsim Sha Tsui

7 July 2023; 14:00	Iran	45–16	Hong Kong	Kowloon Park Sports Centre, Tsim Sha Tsui
7 July 2023; 14:00		(22–8)		Kowloon Park Sports Centre, Tsim Sha Tsui
7 July 2023; 14:00		Report		Kowloon Park Sports Centre, Tsim Sha Tsui

=== Semifinals ===
7 July 2023; 16:00	South Korea	41–20	Chinese Taipei	Kowloon Park Sports Centre, Tsim Sha Tsui
7 July 2023; 16:00		(24–10)		Kowloon Park Sports Centre, Tsim Sha Tsui
7 July 2023; 16:00	1× (suspension)	Report	2× (suspension)	Kowloon Park Sports Centre, Tsim Sha Tsui

7 July 2023; 18:00	China	28–27	Japan	Kowloon Park Sports Centre, Tsim Sha Tsui
7 July 2023; 18:00		(11–16)		Kowloon Park Sports Centre, Tsim Sha Tsui
7 July 2023; 18:00		Report		Kowloon Park Sports Centre, Tsim Sha Tsui

=== Ninth place game ===
7 July 2023; 10:00	Kuwait	10–51	India	Kowloon Park Sports Centre, Tsim Sha Tsui
7 July 2023; 10:00		(6–28)		Kowloon Park Sports Centre, Tsim Sha Tsui
7 July 2023; 10:00		Report		Kowloon Park Sports Centre, Tsim Sha Tsui

=== Seventh place game ===
8 July 2023; 14:00	Uzbekistan	44–23	Hong Kong	Kowloon Park Sports Centre, Tsim Sha Tsui
8 July 2023; 14:00		(24–12)		Kowloon Park Sports Centre, Tsim Sha Tsui
8 July 2023; 14:00		Report		Kowloon Park Sports Centre, Tsim Sha Tsui

=== Fifth place game ===
8 July 2023; 16:00	Kazakhstan	24–27	Iran	Kowloon Park Sports Centre, Tsim Sha Tsui
8 July 2023; 16:00		(12–15)		Kowloon Park Sports Centre, Tsim Sha Tsui
8 July 2023; 16:00		Report		Kowloon Park Sports Centre, Tsim Sha Tsui

=== Third place game ===
9 July 2023; 14:00	Chinese Taipei	23–43	Japan	Kowloon Park Sports Centre, Tsim Sha Tsui; Referees: Noochan, Suansiri (THA)
9 July 2023; 14:00	You 7	(12–18)	Koyama 8	Kowloon Park Sports Centre, Tsim Sha Tsui; Referees: Noochan, Suansiri (THA)
9 July 2023; 14:00	7× (suspension)	Report	1× (suspension)	Kowloon Park Sports Centre, Tsim Sha Tsui; Referees: Noochan, Suansiri (THA)

=== Final ===
9 July 2023; 16:00	South Korea	34–15	China	Kowloon Park Sports Centre, Tsim Sha Tsui; Referees: Al-Naseem, Al-Enezi (KUW)
9 July 2023; 16:00	Kim Min-s. 9	(21–7)	Hou, Liang 4	Kowloon Park Sports Centre, Tsim Sha Tsui; Referees: Al-Naseem, Al-Enezi (KUW)
9 July 2023; 16:00	2× (suspension)	Report	1× (suspension)	Kowloon Park Sports Centre, Tsim Sha Tsui; Referees: Al-Naseem, Al-Enezi (KUW)

== Final standings ==
Rank	Team
1st place, gold medalist(s)	South Korea
2nd place, silver medalist(s)	China
3rd place, bronze medalist(s)	Japan
4	Chinese Taipei
5	Iran
6	Kazakhstan
7	Uzbekistan
8	Hong Kong
9	India
10	Kuwait

Team qualified for the 2024 Junior World Championship

== All Star Team ==
Position	Player
Goalkeeper	(Chinese Taipei) Wu Hsin-yun
Right wing	(China) Shi Zihan
Right back	(South Korea) Lee Hye-won
Centre back	(Japan) Toko Yamaguchi
Left back	(Japan) Ayumi Rokugawa
Left wing	(South Korea) Kim Seo-jin
Pivot	(China) Hou Changqing
MVP	(South Korea) Kim Min-seo
