= 2025 Asian Women's Junior Handball Championship =

Tournament details
- Host country: Uzbekistan
- Venue: 1 (in 1 host city)
- Dates: 20–29 August
- Teams: 10 (from 1 confederation)

Final positions
- Champions: Japan (1st title)
- Runners-up: South Korea
- Third place: China
- Fourth place: Chinese Taipei

Tournament statistics
- Matches played: 24
- Goals scored: 1,402 (58.42 per match)
- Top scorers: (Iran) Aseman Badavi (65 goals)

Awards
- Best player: (Japan) Wakana Kita

The 2025 Asian Women's Junior Handball Championship was the 18th edition of the championship held from 20 to 29 August 2025 at the Alpomish Ice Palace, Tashkent, Uzbekistan under the aegis of Asian Handball Federation. It was the first time in history that championship was organised by the Handball Federation of Uzbekistan. It also acted as the qualification tournament for the 2026 IHF Women's U20 Handball World Championship.

== Draw ==
The draw was held on 8 April 2025 at the Republican Training Center for Olympic and Paralympic Sports, Tashkent.

== Preliminary round ==
All times are local (UTC+5).

=== Group A ===
Pos	Team	Pld	W	D	L	GF	GA	GD	Pts	Qualification
1	China	3	3	0	0	95	46	+49	6	Semifinals
2	Chinese Taipei	3	2	0	1	77	70	+7	4	Semifinals
3	India	3	1	0	2	88	92	−4	2	5–8th place semifinals
4	Hong Kong	3	0	0	3	51	103	−52	0	5–8th place semifinals
—	Uzbekistan (H)	0	0	0	0	0	0	0	0	Disqualified

Source: AHF
Rules for classification: 1) Points; 2) Head-to-head points; 3) Head-to-head goal difference; 4) Head-to-head goals scored; 5) Goal difference; 6) Goals scored; 7) Draw.
(H) Hosts

20 August 2025; 14:00	Hong Kong	11–32	China	Alpomish Ice Palace, Tashkent; Referees: Mozafarivanani, Mazaheri (IRI)
20 August 2025; 14:00	Tan 4	(6–15)	Zhang 8	Alpomish Ice Palace, Tashkent; Referees: Mozafarivanani, Mazaheri (IRI)
20 August 2025; 14:00	3× (suspension)	Report		Alpomish Ice Palace, Tashkent; Referees: Mozafarivanani, Mazaheri (IRI)

20 August 2025; 18:00	India	Voided (29–46)	Uzbekistan	Alpomish Ice Palace, Tashkent
20 August 2025; 18:00		(14–24)		Alpomish Ice Palace, Tashkent

21 August 2025; 14:00	Chinese Taipei	14–27	China	Alpomish Ice Palace, Tashkent; Referees: Ali, Al-Aradi (BHR)
21 August 2025; 14:00	Lin C. 4	(5–13)	Liang 6	Alpomish Ice Palace, Tashkent; Referees: Ali, Al-Aradi (BHR)
21 August 2025; 14:00	1× (suspension)	Report	5× (suspension)	Alpomish Ice Palace, Tashkent; Referees: Ali, Al-Aradi (BHR)

21 August 2025; 18:00	Hong Kong	Voided (15–45)	Uzbekistan	Alpomish Ice Palace, Tashkent
21 August 2025; 18:00		(8–22)		Alpomish Ice Palace, Tashkent

22 August 2025; 12:00	China	36–21	India	Alpomish Ice Palace, Tashkent; Referees: Mozafarivanani, Mazaheri (IRI)
22 August 2025; 12:00	Liang 8	(20–9)	Sujata, Tannu 8	Alpomish Ice Palace, Tashkent; Referees: Mozafarivanani, Mazaheri (IRI)
22 August 2025; 12:00	6× (suspension)	Report	2× (suspension)	Alpomish Ice Palace, Tashkent; Referees: Mozafarivanani, Mazaheri (IRI)

22 August 2025; 16:00	Hong Kong	15–32	Chinese Taipei	Alpomish Ice Palace, Tashkent; Referees: Kim, Kwon (KOR)
22 August 2025; 16:00	Lau S., Tsang 4	(9–15)	Lin L. 7	Alpomish Ice Palace, Tashkent; Referees: Kim, Kwon (KOR)
22 August 2025; 16:00	5× (suspension)	Report		Alpomish Ice Palace, Tashkent; Referees: Kim, Kwon (KOR)

24 August 2025; 14:00	India	39–25	Hong Kong	Alpomish Ice Palace, Tashkent; Referees: Al-Shaib, Al-Naemi (QAT)
24 August 2025; 14:00	Sujata 12	(15–14)	Tsang 9	Alpomish Ice Palace, Tashkent; Referees: Al-Shaib, Al-Naemi (QAT)
24 August 2025; 14:00	2× (suspension)	Report	4× (suspension)	Alpomish Ice Palace, Tashkent; Referees: Al-Shaib, Al-Naemi (QAT)

24 August 2025; 18:00	Chinese Taipei	Voided (27–29)	Uzbekistan	Alpomish Ice Palace, Tashkent
24 August 2025; 18:00		(15–13)		Alpomish Ice Palace, Tashkent

25 August 2025; 14:00	India	28–31	Chinese Taipei	Alpomish Ice Palace, Tashkent; Referees: Mozafarivanani, Mazaheri (IRI)
25 August 2025; 14:00	Sujata 9	(13–14)	Yang 9	Alpomish Ice Palace, Tashkent; Referees: Mozafarivanani, Mazaheri (IRI)
25 August 2025; 14:00	3× (suspension)	Report	2× (suspension)	Alpomish Ice Palace, Tashkent; Referees: Mozafarivanani, Mazaheri (IRI)

25 August 2025; 18:00	Uzbekistan	Voided (25–29)	China	Alpomish Ice Palace, Tashkent
25 August 2025; 18:00		(13–16)		Alpomish Ice Palace, Tashkent

=== Group B ===
Pos	Team	Pld	W	D	L	GF	GA	GD	Pts	Qualification
1	South Korea	4	4	0	0	171	62	+109	8	Semifinals
2	Japan	4	3	0	1	187	63	+124	6	Semifinals
3	Iran	4	2	0	2	151	106	+45	4	5–8th place semifinals
4	Kazakhstan	4	1	0	3	114	140	−26	2	5–8th place semifinals
5	Kyrgyzstan	4	0	0	4	47	299	−252	0	

Source: AHF
Rules for classification: 1) Points; 2) Head-to-head points; 3) Head-to-head goal difference; 4) Head-to-head goals scored; 5) Goal difference; 6) Goals scored; 7) Draw.

20 August 2025; 12:00	Kyrgyzstan	5–69	South Korea	Alpomish Ice Palace, Tashkent; Referees: Li, Wang (CHN)
20 August 2025; 12:00	Anisimova 3	(2–35)	Lee Y. 14	Alpomish Ice Palace, Tashkent; Referees: Li, Wang (CHN)
20 August 2025; 12:00	7× (suspension)	Report	1× (suspension)	Alpomish Ice Palace, Tashkent; Referees: Li, Wang (CHN)

20 August 2025; 16:00	Kazakhstan	14–41	Japan	Alpomish Ice Palace, Tashkent; Referees: Al-Suqufi, Al-Saqer (KSA)
20 August 2025; 16:00	Paley 5	(5–17)	Kio 7	Alpomish Ice Palace, Tashkent; Referees: Al-Suqufi, Al-Saqer (KSA)
20 August 2025; 16:00	5× (suspension)	Report	3× (suspension)	Alpomish Ice Palace, Tashkent; Referees: Al-Suqufi, Al-Saqer (KSA)

21 August 2025; 12:00	Iran	18–30	Japan	Alpomish Ice Palace, Tashkent; Referees: Razakbergenova, Allayarova (UZB)
21 August 2025; 12:00	Badavi 9	(10–12)	Nakao 7	Alpomish Ice Palace, Tashkent; Referees: Razakbergenova, Allayarova (UZB)
21 August 2025; 12:00	4× (suspension)	Report	2× (suspension)	Alpomish Ice Palace, Tashkent; Referees: Razakbergenova, Allayarova (UZB)

21 August 2025; 16:00	Kazakhstan	17–40	South Korea	Alpomish Ice Palace, Tashkent; Referees: Al-Naseem, Al-Enezi (KUW)
21 August 2025; 16:00	Frankovskaya 7	(9–15)	Lee Y. 9	Alpomish Ice Palace, Tashkent; Referees: Al-Naseem, Al-Enezi (KUW)
21 August 2025; 16:00	1× (suspension)	Report	4× (suspension)	Alpomish Ice Palace, Tashkent; Referees: Al-Naseem, Al-Enezi (KUW)

22 August 2025; 14:00	Japan	95–8	Kyrgyzstan	Alpomish Ice Palace, Tashkent; Referees: Al-Suqufi, Al-Saqer (KSA)
22 August 2025; 14:00	Kato, Kio 12	(51–4)	Anisimova 4	Alpomish Ice Palace, Tashkent; Referees: Al-Suqufi, Al-Saqer (KSA)
22 August 2025; 14:00		Report	8× (suspension)	Alpomish Ice Palace, Tashkent; Referees: Al-Suqufi, Al-Saqer (KSA)

22 August 2025; 18:00	Kazakhstan	25–37	Iran	Alpomish Ice Palace, Tashkent; Referees: Li, Wang (CHN)
22 August 2025; 18:00	Golushko 7	(13–22)	Badavi 13	Alpomish Ice Palace, Tashkent; Referees: Li, Wang (CHN)
22 August 2025; 18:00	6× (suspension)	Report	3× (suspension)	Alpomish Ice Palace, Tashkent; Referees: Li, Wang (CHN)

24 August 2025; 12:00	Kyrgyzstan	22–58	Kazakhstan	Alpomish Ice Palace, Tashkent; Referees: Razakbergenova, Allayarova (UZB)
24 August 2025; 12:00	Anisimova 8	(9–25)	Tursyn 18	Alpomish Ice Palace, Tashkent; Referees: Razakbergenova, Allayarova (UZB)
24 August 2025; 12:00	2× (suspension)	Report	2× (suspension)	Alpomish Ice Palace, Tashkent; Referees: Razakbergenova, Allayarova (UZB)

24 August 2025; 16:00	Iran	19–39	South Korea	Alpomish Ice Palace, Tashkent; Referees: Al-Enezi, Al-Naseem (KUW)
24 August 2025; 16:00	Badavi, Jahangirian 5	(7–18)	three players 7	Alpomish Ice Palace, Tashkent; Referees: Al-Enezi, Al-Naseem (KUW)
24 August 2025; 16:00	1× (suspension)	Report	4× (suspension)	Alpomish Ice Palace, Tashkent; Referees: Al-Enezi, Al-Naseem (KUW)

25 August 2025; 12:00	Kyrgyzstan	12–77	Iran	Alpomish Ice Palace, Tashkent; Referees: Al-Suqufi, Al-Saqer (KSA)
25 August 2025; 12:00	Anisimova 6	(2–39)	Badavi 20	Alpomish Ice Palace, Tashkent; Referees: Al-Suqufi, Al-Saqer (KSA)
25 August 2025; 12:00	6× (suspension)	Report	1× (suspension)	Alpomish Ice Palace, Tashkent; Referees: Al-Suqufi, Al-Saqer (KSA)

25 August 2025; 16:00	South Korea	23–21	Japan	Alpomish Ice Palace, Tashkent; Referees: Ali, Al-Aradi (BHR)
25 August 2025; 16:00	Seo 7	(9–11)	Kato 6	Alpomish Ice Palace, Tashkent; Referees: Ali, Al-Aradi (BHR)
25 August 2025; 16:00	3× (suspension)	Report		Alpomish Ice Palace, Tashkent; Referees: Ali, Al-Aradi (BHR)

== Knockout stage ==
=== Bracket ===
Semifinals
27 August
China	19
Japan	26
27 August
South Korea	31
Chinese Taipei	17

Final
29 August
Japan	20
South Korea	18
Third place
29 August
China	22
Chinese Taipei	17

5–8th place semifinals
27 August
India	34
Kazakhstan	33
27 August
Iran	39
Hong Kong	20

Fifth place
29 August
India	22
Iran	21
Seventh place
29 August
Kazakhstan	45
Hong Kong	37

=== 5–8th place semifinals ===
27 August 2025; 12:00	India	34–33	Kazakhstan	Alpomish Ice Palace, Tashkent; Referees: Li, Wang (CHN)
27 August 2025; 12:00	Balaso 10	(14–18)	Tursyn 7	Alpomish Ice Palace, Tashkent; Referees: Li, Wang (CHN)
27 August 2025; 12:00	6× (suspension)	Report	2× (suspension)	Alpomish Ice Palace, Tashkent; Referees: Li, Wang (CHN)

27 August 2025; 14:00	Iran	39–20	Hong Kong	Alpomish Ice Palace, Tashkent; Referees: Kim, Kwon (KOR)
27 August 2025; 14:00	Badavi 15	(20–10)	Cheuk 7	Alpomish Ice Palace, Tashkent; Referees: Kim, Kwon (KOR)
27 August 2025; 14:00	1× (suspension)	Report	1× (suspension)	Alpomish Ice Palace, Tashkent; Referees: Kim, Kwon (KOR)

=== Semifinals ===
27 August 2025; 16:00	China	19–26	Japan	Alpomish Ice Palace, Tashkent; Referees: Razakbergenova, Allayarova (UZB)
27 August 2025; 16:00	Huang Z. 4	(12–16)	Kita 6	Alpomish Ice Palace, Tashkent; Referees: Razakbergenova, Allayarova (UZB)
27 August 2025; 16:00	1× (yellow card)	Report	1× (suspension)	Alpomish Ice Palace, Tashkent; Referees: Razakbergenova, Allayarova (UZB)

27 August 2025; 18:00	South Korea	31–17	Chinese Taipei	Alpomish Ice Palace, Tashkent; Referees: Mozafari, Mazaheri (IRI)
27 August 2025; 18:00	Kim B. 7	(16–11)	Lin C. 4	Alpomish Ice Palace, Tashkent; Referees: Mozafari, Mazaheri (IRI)
27 August 2025; 18:00	3× (suspension)	Report		Alpomish Ice Palace, Tashkent; Referees: Mozafari, Mazaheri (IRI)

=== Seventh place game ===
29 August 2025; 12:00	Kazakhstan	45–37	Hong Kong	Alpomish Ice Palace, Tashkent; Referees: Al-Shaib, Al-Naemi (QAT)
29 August 2025; 12:00	Paley 9	(24–18)	Tsang 13	Alpomish Ice Palace, Tashkent; Referees: Al-Shaib, Al-Naemi (QAT)
29 August 2025; 12:00	1× (suspension)	Report		Alpomish Ice Palace, Tashkent; Referees: Al-Shaib, Al-Naemi (QAT)

=== Fifth place game ===
29 August 2025; 14:00	India	22–21	Iran	Alpomish Ice Palace, Tashkent; Referees: Ali, Al-Aradi (BHR)
29 August 2025; 14:00	Anika, Balaso 6	(10–12)	Jafarinezhad 5	Alpomish Ice Palace, Tashkent; Referees: Ali, Al-Aradi (BHR)
29 August 2025; 14:00	5× (suspension)	Report	4× (suspension)	Alpomish Ice Palace, Tashkent; Referees: Ali, Al-Aradi (BHR)

=== Third place game ===
29 August 2025; 16:00	China	22–17	Chinese Taipei	Alpomish Ice Palace, Tashkent; Referees: Kim, Kwon (KOR)
29 August 2025; 16:00	Hu, Zheng 4	(9–9)	Lin C. 6	Alpomish Ice Palace, Tashkent; Referees: Kim, Kwon (KOR)
29 August 2025; 16:00	1× (suspension)	Report		Alpomish Ice Palace, Tashkent; Referees: Kim, Kwon (KOR)

=== Final ===
29 August 2025; 18:00	Japan	20–18	South Korea	Alpomish Ice Palace, Tashkent; Referees: Al-Enezi, Al-Naseem (KUW)
29 August 2025; 18:00	Nakamura 9	(11–10)	Seo 7	Alpomish Ice Palace, Tashkent; Referees: Al-Enezi, Al-Naseem (KUW)
29 August 2025; 18:00	1× (yellow card) 3× (suspension)	Report	1× (yellow card) 1× (suspension) 1× (red card)	Alpomish Ice Palace, Tashkent; Referees: Al-Enezi, Al-Naseem (KUW)

== Final standings ==
Rank	Team
1st place, gold medalist(s)	Japan
2nd place, silver medalist(s)	South Korea
3rd place, bronze medalist(s)	China
4	Chinese Taipei
5	India
6	Iran
7	Kazakhstan
8	Hong Kong
9	Kyrgyzstan
DSQ	Uzbekistan

Team qualified for the 2026 U20 World Championship
Team qualified for the 2026 U20 World Championship as a host nation

== All-Star Team ==
Position	Player
Goalkeeper	(Chinese Taipei) Fu Yu-jun
Right wing	(South Korea) Lee Ye-seo
Right back	(China) Liang Jing
Centre back	(South Korea) Kim Bo-kyeong
Left back	(Japan) Ai Nakao
Left wing	(Japan) Jurina Kio
Pivot	(China) Yang Yue
MVP	(Japan) Wakana Kita
