= 2026 IHF Women's U20 Handball World Championship =

IHF Women's U20 Handball World Championship
Tournament details
- Host country: China
- Venues: 4 (in 1 host city)
- Dates: 24 June – 5 July
- Teams: 32 (from 5 confederations)

Final positions
- Champions: Germany (2nd title)
- Runners-up: Denmark
- Third place: France
- Fourth place: Spain

Tournament statistics
- Matches played: 116
- Goals scored: 6,327 (54.54 per match)
- Top scorers: (Denmark) Kirstine Hoppe (62 goals)

Awards
- Best player: (Germany) Ruslana Litvinov

The 2026 IHF Women's U20 Handball World Championship was the 25th edition of the IHF Women's U20 Handball World Championship, the biennial international handball championship organised under the aegis of IHF for the women's U20 national teams across the world. It was held in China from 29 July to 9 August 2026, with Jinzhong being the host city. This was China's second time hosting after 1999.

For the third time, 32 teams took part, following the expansion in 2022. Continental championships acted as qualification that took place between July 2025 and April 2026. The hosts China automatically qualified. Canada and Turkey return after long absences.

France were the defending champions, having beaten Hungary 29–26 at the 2024 final in Skopje, but they were eliminated in the semi-finals by Germany, who won their second title with a win over Denmark.

== Qualification ==
Team	Qualification method	Date of qualification	Appearance(s)				Previous best performance (Note: Bold text indicates they hosted that edition.)
Team	Qualification method	Date of qualification	Total	First	Last	Streak	Previous best performance
Denmark	2025 European U-19 Championship	10 July 2025	23rd	1977	2024	7	Champions (1997, 2016)
Czech Republic	2025 European U-19 Championship	10 July 2025	8th	1995	2024	1	Eleventh place (1995, 2014, 2022)
Serbia	2025 European U-19 Championship	10 July 2025	5th	2010	2024	2	Fourth place (2012)
France	2025 European U-19 Championship	12 July 2025	19th	1977	2024	10	Champions (2024)
Croatia	2025 European U-19 Championship	12 July 2025	12th	1995	2022	1	Fourth place (2003)
Germany	2025 European U-19 Championship	12 July 2025	13th	1991	2024	6	Champions (2008)
Montenegro	2025 European U-19 Championship	12 July 2025	7th	2008	2024	5	Third place (2010)
Norway	2025 European U-19 Championship	12 July 2025	19th	1977	2024	8	Champions (2010, 2022)
Sweden	2025 European U-19 Championship	12 July 2025	16th	1983	2024	8	Champions (2012)
Austria	2025 European U-19 Championship	12 July 2025	10th	1977	2022	1	Eleventh place (1979, 1993, 2012)
Hungary	2025 European U-19 Championship	12 July 2025	16th	1977	2024	14	Champions (2018)
Spain	2025 European U-19 Championship	12 July 2025	13th	1985	2024	1	Fourth place (2001, 2008)
Poland	2025 European U-19 Championship	14 July 2025	10th	1977	2022	1	Third place (1985)
Romania	2025 European U-19 Championship	14 July 2025	17th	1977	2024	7	Champions (1995, 1999)
Turkey	2025 European U-19 Championship	14 July 2025	5th	1989	2001	1	Eleventh place (1997, 1999, 2001)
Iceland	2025 European U-19 Championship	15 July 2025	5th	1999	2024	1	Seventh place (2024)
United States	2025 IHF Trophy U19 – North America and the Caribbean	20 July 2025	5th	1979	2024	3	Eleventh place (1981)
Canada	2025 IHF Trophy U19 – North America and the Caribbean	20 July 2025	3rd	1981	1999	1	Eighth place (1981)
China	2025 Asian Junior Championship	24 August 2025	20th	1981	2024	2	Sixth place (1981, 1985, 1989)
Japan	2025 Asian Junior Championship	24 August 2025	22nd	1979	2024	21	Eighth place (1997)
South Korea	2025 Asian Junior Championship	24 August 2025	22nd	1981	2024	22	Champions (2014)
Chinese Taipei	2025 Asian Junior Championship	27 August 2025	6th	1991	2024	2	Eleventh place (1991)
Egypt	2025 African Women's Junior Handball Championship	10 September 2025	5th	2016	2024	5	13th place (2024)
Tunisia	2025 African Women's Junior Handball Championship	10 September 2025	9th	2001	2024	3	14th place (2001)
Guinea	2025 African Women's Junior Handball Championship	10 September 2025	3rd	2022	2024	1	23rd place (2022, 2024)
Angola	2025 African Women's Junior Handball Championship	11 September 2025	14th	1995	2024	10	Sixth place (2022)
Brazil	2026 South and Central American Women's Junior Handball Championship	15 January 2026	17th	1991	2024	17	Ninth place (2005, 2008)
Argentina	2026 South and Central American Women's Junior Handball Championship	15 January 2026	11th	1995	2024	1	Twelfth place (2008)
Paraguay	2026 South and Central American Women's Junior Handball Championship	16 January 2026	2nd	2018		1	22nd place (2018)
India (Note: Since China was later given the hosting rights, their vacant spot was given to India, the next best ranked team in the Asian Championship.)	2025 Asian Junior Championship	5 March 2026	2nd	2022		1	26th place (2022)
Algeria (Note: Since the 2026 IHF Inter-Continental Trophy winners, Guinea, had already qualified via the African Championship, the spot was given to the next best team in the African Championship, being fifth place Algeria.)	2025 African Women's Junior Handball Championship	11 April 2026	6th	1989	2024	2	Twelfth place (1989)
Faroe Islands	Wildcard	20 April 2026	1st	Debut			

== Draw ==
The draw was held on 18 March 2026 in Basel, Switzerland.

=== Seeding ===
The seeding was announced on 5 March 2026.

Pot 1	Pot 2	Pot 3	Pot 4
Germany; Spain; Denmark; Austria; France; Montenegro; Hungary; Croatia	Romania; Czech Republic; Poland; Serbia; China; Egypt; Japan; South Korea	Sweden; Norway; Guinea; Brazil; Chinese Taipei; Argentina; Iceland; Angola	Tunisia; Turkey; India; Paraguay; Canada; United States; Algeria; Faroe Islands

- Australia withdrew before the draw.

== Referees ==
The referees were announced on 14 April 2026.

Referees
Brazil	Bruna Correa; Renata Correa
China	Cheng Yufeng; Zhou Yunle
Croatia	Ante Mikelić; Petar Parađina
Denmark	Nichlas Nygaard; Jonas Primdahl
Egypt	Moustafa Abdelkarim; Ahmed Kedis
Egypt	Heidy El-Saied; Yasmina El-Saied
France	Mathilde Cournil; Loriane Lamour
Germany	Ramesh Thiyagarajah; Suresh Thiyagarajah

Referees
Hungary	Kristóf Altmár; Márton Horváth
Iran	Amir Gheisarian; Ahmad Gheisarian
Italy/Romania	Alejandra Pepe; Simona Stancu
Kuwait	Maali Al-Enezi; Dalal Al-Nassem
North Macedonia	Ismailj Metalari; Nenad Nikolovski
Norway	Mads Fremstad; Jørgen Jørstad
Portugal	Rúben Maia; André Nunes
Romania	Cristina Lovin; Simona Stancu

Referees
Senegal	Fadel Diop; Abdoulaye Faye
Serbia	Stefan Berdić; Filip Šorak
Spain	Raúl Oyarzun; Aritz Zaragüeta
Tunisia	Makrem Ben Dahou; Rochdi Zoghlami
Ukraine	Maryna Duplii; Olena Karpushchenko
Uruguay	Nicolás Perdomo; Germán Araujo
Uzbekistan	Khasan Ismoilov; Khusan Ismoilov

== Preliminary round ==
All times are local (UTC+8).

=== Group A ===
Pos	Team	Pld	W	D	L	GF	GA	GD	Pts	Qualification
1	France	3	3	0	0	93	57	+36	6	Main round
2	Sweden	3	2	0	1	89	59	+30	4	Main round
3	Egypt	3	1	0	2	105	77	+28	2	Presidents Cup
4	India	3	0	0	3	42	136	−94	0	Presidents Cup

Source: IHF
Rules for classification: 1) points; 2) head-to-head points; 3) head-to-head goal difference; 4) head-to-head number of goals scored; 5) goal difference.

24 June 2026; 16:15	France	24–22	Sweden	Vocational & Technical College Gymnasium, Jinzhong; Attendance: 250; Referees: Ismoilov, Ismoilov (UZB)
24 June 2026; 16:15	Injai 5	(14–9)	three players 4	Vocational & Technical College Gymnasium, Jinzhong; Attendance: 250; Referees: Ismoilov, Ismoilov (UZB)
24 June 2026; 16:15	5× (suspension)	Report	1× (suspension)	Vocational & Technical College Gymnasium, Jinzhong; Attendance: 250; Referees: Ismoilov, Ismoilov (UZB)

24 June 2026; 18:30	Egypt	56–21	India	Vocational & Technical College Gymnasium, Jinzhong; Attendance: 150; Referees: Pepe (ITA), Stancu ( ROU)
24 June 2026; 18:30	Tamer 10	(29–10)	Sujata 7	Vocational & Technical College Gymnasium, Jinzhong; Attendance: 150; Referees: Pepe (ITA), Stancu ( ROU)
24 June 2026; 18:30	1× (yellow card) 5× (suspension)	Report	1× (suspension)	Vocational & Technical College Gymnasium, Jinzhong; Attendance: 150; Referees: Pepe (ITA), Stancu ( ROU)

25 June 2026; 16:15	India	8–38	France	Vocational & Technical College Gymnasium, Jinzhong; Attendance: 250; Referees: Cheng, Zhou (CHN)
25 June 2026; 16:15	Devi 4	(4–22)	Henry 7	Vocational & Technical College Gymnasium, Jinzhong; Attendance: 250; Referees: Cheng, Zhou (CHN)
25 June 2026; 16:15		Report		Vocational & Technical College Gymnasium, Jinzhong; Attendance: 250; Referees: Cheng, Zhou (CHN)

25 June 2026; 18:30	Egypt	22–25	Sweden	Vocational & Technical College Gymnasium, Jinzhong; Attendance: 400; Referees: Altmár, Horváth (HUN)
25 June 2026; 18:30	Ahmed 7	(12–15)	Lundvall 7	Vocational & Technical College Gymnasium, Jinzhong; Attendance: 400; Referees: Altmár, Horváth (HUN)
25 June 2026; 18:30	5× (suspension)	Report	8× (suspension)	Vocational & Technical College Gymnasium, Jinzhong; Attendance: 400; Referees: Altmár, Horváth (HUN)

27 June 2026; 16:15	Sweden	42–13	India	Vocational & Technical College Gymnasium, Jinzhong; Attendance: 500; Referees: Duplii, Karpushchenko (UKR)
27 June 2026; 16:15	three players 6	(21–6)	Kanishka 5	Vocational & Technical College Gymnasium, Jinzhong; Attendance: 500; Referees: Duplii, Karpushchenko (UKR)
27 June 2026; 16:15	3× (suspension)	Report	2× (suspension)	Vocational & Technical College Gymnasium, Jinzhong; Attendance: 500; Referees: Duplii, Karpushchenko (UKR)

27 June 2026; 18:30	France	31–27	Egypt	Vocational & Technical College Gymnasium, Jinzhong; Attendance: 800; Referees: Metalari, Nikolovski (MKD)
27 June 2026; 18:30	Vama 8	(12–14)	Waled 11	Vocational & Technical College Gymnasium, Jinzhong; Attendance: 800; Referees: Metalari, Nikolovski (MKD)
27 June 2026; 18:30	1× (yellow card) 6× (suspension)	Report	5× (suspension)	Vocational & Technical College Gymnasium, Jinzhong; Attendance: 800; Referees: Metalari, Nikolovski (MKD)

=== Group B ===
Pos	Team	Pld	W	D	L	GF	GA	GD	Pts	Qualification
1	Serbia	3	3	0	0	95	58	+37	6	Main round
2	Austria	3	2	0	1	85	66	+19	4	Main round
3	Angola	3	1	0	2	62	66	−4	2	Presidents Cup
4	Paraguay	3	0	0	3	41	93	−52	0	Presidents Cup

Source: IHF
Rules for classification: 1) points; 2) head-to-head points; 3) head-to-head goal difference; 4) head-to-head number of goals scored; 5) goal difference.

24 June 2026; 11:45	Austria	29–22	Angola	Vocational & Technical College Gymnasium, Jinzhong; Attendance: 100; Referees: Fremstad, Jørstad (NOR)
24 June 2026; 11:45	Chroust 7	(14–12)	four players 4	Vocational & Technical College Gymnasium, Jinzhong; Attendance: 100; Referees: Fremstad, Jørstad (NOR)
24 June 2026; 11:45	4× (suspension)	Report	2× (suspension)	Vocational & Technical College Gymnasium, Jinzhong; Attendance: 100; Referees: Fremstad, Jørstad (NOR)

24 June 2026; 14:00	Serbia	40–15	Paraguay	Vocational & Technical College Gymnasium, Jinzhong; Attendance: 80; Referees: Gheisarian, Gheisarian (IRI)
24 June 2026; 14:00	Nedeljković 5	(21–6)	Bernal 5	Vocational & Technical College Gymnasium, Jinzhong; Attendance: 80; Referees: Gheisarian, Gheisarian (IRI)
24 June 2026; 14:00	1× (yellow card) 2× (suspension)	Report	5× (suspension) 1× (red card)	Vocational & Technical College Gymnasium, Jinzhong; Attendance: 80; Referees: Gheisarian, Gheisarian (IRI)

25 June 2026; 11:45	Paraguay	15–29	Austria	Vocational & Technical College Gymnasium, Jinzhong; Attendance: 100; Referees: Al-Enezi, Al-Naseem (KUW)
25 June 2026; 11:45	Corvalan 4	(9–15)	Thun 5	Vocational & Technical College Gymnasium, Jinzhong; Attendance: 100; Referees: Al-Enezi, Al-Naseem (KUW)
25 June 2026; 11:45	3× (suspension)	Report	1× (yellow card) 3× (suspension)	Vocational & Technical College Gymnasium, Jinzhong; Attendance: 100; Referees: Al-Enezi, Al-Naseem (KUW)

25 June 2026; 14:00	Serbia	26–16	Angola	Vocational & Technical College Gymnasium, Jinzhong; Attendance: 200; Referees: Araújo, Perdomo (URU)
25 June 2026; 14:00	Otašević 5	(12–7)	Nunda 4	Vocational & Technical College Gymnasium, Jinzhong; Attendance: 200; Referees: Araújo, Perdomo (URU)
25 June 2026; 14:00	2× (suspension)	Report	1× (yellow card) 5× (suspension) 1× (red card)	Vocational & Technical College Gymnasium, Jinzhong; Attendance: 200; Referees: Araújo, Perdomo (URU)

27 June 2026; 11:45	Angola	24–11	Paraguay	Vocational & Technical College Gymnasium, Jinzhong; Attendance: 300; Referees: Ben Dahou, Zoghlami (TUN)
27 June 2026; 11:45	Cateco 6	(11–6)	C. López 4	Vocational & Technical College Gymnasium, Jinzhong; Attendance: 300; Referees: Ben Dahou, Zoghlami (TUN)
27 June 2026; 11:45	3× (suspension) 1× (red card)	Report	4× (suspension) 1× (red card)	Vocational & Technical College Gymnasium, Jinzhong; Attendance: 300; Referees: Ben Dahou, Zoghlami (TUN)

27 June 2026; 14:00	Austria	27–29	Serbia	Vocational & Technical College Gymnasium, Jinzhong; Attendance: 400; Referees: Nygaard, Primdahl (DEN)
27 June 2026; 14:00	Matičević 10	(11–14)	Stanić 6	Vocational & Technical College Gymnasium, Jinzhong; Attendance: 400; Referees: Nygaard, Primdahl (DEN)
27 June 2026; 14:00	1× (yellow card) 3× (suspension)	Report	6× (suspension)	Vocational & Technical College Gymnasium, Jinzhong; Attendance: 400; Referees: Nygaard, Primdahl (DEN)

=== Group C ===
Pos	Team	Pld	W	D	L	GF	GA	GD	Pts	Qualification
1	Germany	3	3	0	0	122	64	+58	6	Main round
2	Romania	3	2	0	1	101	80	+21	4	Main round
3	Brazil	3	1	0	2	89	85	+4	2	Presidents Cup
4	Canada	3	0	0	3	42	125	−83	0	Presidents Cup

Source: IHF
Rules for classification: 1) points; 2) head-to-head points; 3) head-to-head goal difference; 4) head-to-head number of goals scored; 5) goal difference.

24 June 2026; 16:15	Germany	39–22	Brazil	Shanxi Medical University Zhongdu Campus Gymnasium, Jinzhong; Attendance: 350; Referees: Al-Enezi, Al-Nassem (KUW)
24 June 2026; 16:15	Njinkeu, Rohr 8	(23–14)	Ladeia, Vitor 5	Shanxi Medical University Zhongdu Campus Gymnasium, Jinzhong; Attendance: 350; Referees: Al-Enezi, Al-Nassem (KUW)
24 June 2026; 16:15	3× (suspension)	Report	3× (suspension)	Shanxi Medical University Zhongdu Campus Gymnasium, Jinzhong; Attendance: 350; Referees: Al-Enezi, Al-Nassem (KUW)

24 June 2026; 18:30	Romania	40–15	Canada	Shanxi Medical University Zhongdu Campus Gymnasium, Jinzhong; Attendance: 300; Referees: Berdić, Šorak (SRB)
24 June 2026; 18:30	Bodijar 7	(22–8)	Boisclair 6	Shanxi Medical University Zhongdu Campus Gymnasium, Jinzhong; Attendance: 300; Referees: Berdić, Šorak (SRB)
24 June 2026; 18:30	2× (suspension)	Report	5× (suspension)	Shanxi Medical University Zhongdu Campus Gymnasium, Jinzhong; Attendance: 300; Referees: Berdić, Šorak (SRB)

25 June 2026; 16:15	Canada	11–46	Germany	Shanxi Medical University Zhongdu Campus Gymnasium, Jinzhong; Attendance: 390; Referees: Gheisarian, Gheisarian (IRI)
25 June 2026; 16:15	Lemaire 4	(7–22)	Bornhardt 8	Shanxi Medical University Zhongdu Campus Gymnasium, Jinzhong; Attendance: 390; Referees: Gheisarian, Gheisarian (IRI)
25 June 2026; 16:15	5× (suspension) 1× (red card)	Report	1× (suspension)	Shanxi Medical University Zhongdu Campus Gymnasium, Jinzhong; Attendance: 390; Referees: Gheisarian, Gheisarian (IRI)

25 June 2026; 18:30	Romania	30–28	Brazil	Shanxi Medical University Zhongdu Campus Gymnasium, Jinzhong; Attendance: 390; Referees: Nygaard, Primdahl (DEN)
25 June 2026; 18:30	Damian 10	(16–14)	Ladeia 8	Shanxi Medical University Zhongdu Campus Gymnasium, Jinzhong; Attendance: 390; Referees: Nygaard, Primdahl (DEN)
25 June 2026; 18:30	1× (suspension)	Report	1× (yellow card) 5× (suspension)	Shanxi Medical University Zhongdu Campus Gymnasium, Jinzhong; Attendance: 390; Referees: Nygaard, Primdahl (DEN)

27 June 2026; 16:15	Brazil	39–16	Canada	Shanxi Medical University Zhongdu Campus Gymnasium, Jinzhong; Attendance: 600; Referees: Abdelkarim, Kedis (EGY)
27 June 2026; 16:15	Mendes 9	(18–9)	Lemaire 5	Shanxi Medical University Zhongdu Campus Gymnasium, Jinzhong; Attendance: 600; Referees: Abdelkarim, Kedis (EGY)
27 June 2026; 16:15	5× (suspension)	Report	2× (suspension)	Shanxi Medical University Zhongdu Campus Gymnasium, Jinzhong; Attendance: 600; Referees: Abdelkarim, Kedis (EGY)

27 June 2026; 18:30	Germany	37–31	Romania	Shanxi Medical University Zhongdu Campus Gymnasium, Jinzhong; Attendance: 700; Referees: Fremstad, Jørstad (NOR)
27 June 2026; 18:30	Rohr 11	(20–16)	Damian 12	Shanxi Medical University Zhongdu Campus Gymnasium, Jinzhong; Attendance: 700; Referees: Fremstad, Jørstad (NOR)
27 June 2026; 18:30	3× (suspension)	Report	4× (suspension)	Shanxi Medical University Zhongdu Campus Gymnasium, Jinzhong; Attendance: 700; Referees: Fremstad, Jørstad (NOR)

=== Group D ===
Pos	Team	Pld	W	D	L	GF	GA	GD	Pts	Qualification
1	Spain	3	3	0	0	94	58	+36	6	Main round
2	South Korea	3	2	0	1	78	85	−7	4	Main round
3	Argentina	3	1	0	2	72	81	−9	2	Presidents Cup
4	Turkey	3	0	0	3	74	94	−20	0	Presidents Cup

Source: IHF
Rules for classification: 1) points; 2) head-to-head points; 3) head-to-head goal difference; 4) head-to-head number of goals scored; 5) goal difference.

24 June 2026; 11:45	Spain	29–19	Argentina	Shanxi Medical University Zhongdu Campus Gymnasium, Jinzhong; Attendance: 150; Referees: El-Saied, El-Saied (EGY)
24 June 2026; 11:45	B. Rodríguez 8	(16–7)	Molina 5	Shanxi Medical University Zhongdu Campus Gymnasium, Jinzhong; Attendance: 150; Referees: El-Saied, El-Saied (EGY)
24 June 2026; 11:45	3× (suspension)	Report	4× (suspension)	Shanxi Medical University Zhongdu Campus Gymnasium, Jinzhong; Attendance: 150; Referees: El-Saied, El-Saied (EGY)

24 June 2026; 14:00	South Korea	32–29	Turkey	Shanxi Medical University Zhongdu Campus Gymnasium, Jinzhong; Attendance: 150; Referees: Ben Dahou, Zoghlami (TUN)
24 June 2026; 14:00	Suh 9	(14–10)	Seven 8	Shanxi Medical University Zhongdu Campus Gymnasium, Jinzhong; Attendance: 150; Referees: Ben Dahou, Zoghlami (TUN)
24 June 2026; 14:00	8× (suspension)	Report	4× (suspension)	Shanxi Medical University Zhongdu Campus Gymnasium, Jinzhong; Attendance: 150; Referees: Ben Dahou, Zoghlami (TUN)

25 June 2026; 11:45	Turkey	19–33	Spain	Shanxi Medical University Zhongdu Campus Gymnasium, Jinzhong; Attendance: 150; Referees: Al-Saqer, Al Suqufi (KSA)
25 June 2026; 11:45	Çınar 4	(11–18)	Patiño 5	Shanxi Medical University Zhongdu Campus Gymnasium, Jinzhong; Attendance: 150; Referees: Al-Saqer, Al Suqufi (KSA)
25 June 2026; 11:45	3× (suspension)	Report	3× (suspension)	Shanxi Medical University Zhongdu Campus Gymnasium, Jinzhong; Attendance: 150; Referees: Al-Saqer, Al Suqufi (KSA)

25 June 2026; 14:00	South Korea	26–24	Argentina	Shanxi Medical University Zhongdu Campus Gymnasium, Jinzhong; Attendance: 350; Referees: Maia, Nunes (POR)
25 June 2026; 14:00	Suh 10	(11–13)	Genoud 6	Shanxi Medical University Zhongdu Campus Gymnasium, Jinzhong; Attendance: 350; Referees: Maia, Nunes (POR)
25 June 2026; 14:00	4× (suspension)	Report	3× (suspension)	Shanxi Medical University Zhongdu Campus Gymnasium, Jinzhong; Attendance: 350; Referees: Maia, Nunes (POR)

27 June 2026; 11:45	Argentina	29–26	Turkey	Shanxi Medical University Zhongdu Campus Gymnasium, Jinzhong; Attendance: 500; Referees: Cheng, Zhou (CHN)
27 June 2026; 11:45	Molina 10	(11–12)	Sönmez 6	Shanxi Medical University Zhongdu Campus Gymnasium, Jinzhong; Attendance: 500; Referees: Cheng, Zhou (CHN)
27 June 2026; 11:45	1× (suspension)	Report	3× (suspension)	Shanxi Medical University Zhongdu Campus Gymnasium, Jinzhong; Attendance: 500; Referees: Cheng, Zhou (CHN)

27 June 2026; 14:00	Spain	32–20	South Korea	Shanxi Medical University Zhongdu Campus Gymnasium, Jinzhong; Attendance: 550; Referees: Al-Enezi, Al-Nassem (KUW)
27 June 2026; 14:00	Fidalgo 8	(17–9)	Park C., Suh 5	Shanxi Medical University Zhongdu Campus Gymnasium, Jinzhong; Attendance: 550; Referees: Al-Enezi, Al-Nassem (KUW)
27 June 2026; 14:00	2× (suspension)	Report	3× (suspension)	Shanxi Medical University Zhongdu Campus Gymnasium, Jinzhong; Attendance: 550; Referees: Al-Enezi, Al-Nassem (KUW)

=== Group E ===
Pos	Team	Pld	W	D	L	GF	GA	GD	Pts	Qualification
1	Denmark	3	3	0	0	113	65	+48	6	Main round
2	China (H)	3	2	0	1	85	80	+5	4	Main round
3	Algeria	3	1	0	2	68	93	−25	2	Presidents Cup
4	Guinea	3	0	0	3	55	83	−28	0	Presidents Cup

Source: IHF
Rules for classification: 1) points; 2) head-to-head points; 3) head-to-head goal difference; 4) head-to-head number of goals scored; 5) goal difference.
(H) Hosts

24 June 2026; 16:15	Denmark	32–16	Guinea	City Gymnasium, Jinzhong; Attendance: 2,250; Referees: Oyarzun, Zaragüeta (ESP)
24 June 2026; 16:15	Hoppe 7	(18–11)	four players 3	City Gymnasium, Jinzhong; Attendance: 2,250; Referees: Oyarzun, Zaragüeta (ESP)
24 June 2026; 16:15	1× (yellow card) 3× (suspension)	Report	6× (suspension)	City Gymnasium, Jinzhong; Attendance: 2,250; Referees: Oyarzun, Zaragüeta (ESP)

24 June 2026; 18:30	China	33–20	Algeria	City Gymnasium, Jinzhong; Attendance: 3,125; Referees: Duplii, Karpushchenko (UKR)
24 June 2026; 18:30	Liang 7	(12–10)	Zediri 5	City Gymnasium, Jinzhong; Attendance: 3,125; Referees: Duplii, Karpushchenko (UKR)
24 June 2026; 18:30	1× (yellow card) 4× (suspension)	Report	4× (suspension)	City Gymnasium, Jinzhong; Attendance: 3,125; Referees: Duplii, Karpushchenko (UKR)

25 June 2026; 16:15	Algeria	24–39	Denmark	City Gymnasium, Jinzhong; Attendance: 390; Referees: Berdić, Sorak (SRB)
25 June 2026; 16:15	Mestouri-Theodore 5	(12–19)	Hoppe 11	City Gymnasium, Jinzhong; Attendance: 390; Referees: Berdić, Sorak (SRB)
25 June 2026; 16:15	3× (suspension)	Report	4× (suspension)	City Gymnasium, Jinzhong; Attendance: 390; Referees: Berdić, Sorak (SRB)

25 June 2026; 18:30	China	27–18	Guinea	City Gymnasium, Jinzhong; Attendance: 2,500; Referees: Correa, Correa (BRA)
25 June 2026; 18:30	Zhang S. 7	(17–8)	four players 3	City Gymnasium, Jinzhong; Attendance: 2,500; Referees: Correa, Correa (BRA)
25 June 2026; 18:30	2× (suspension) 1× (red card)	Report	2× (suspension)	City Gymnasium, Jinzhong; Attendance: 2,500; Referees: Correa, Correa (BRA)

27 June 2026; 16:15	Guinea	21–24	Algeria	City Gymnasium, Jinzhong; Attendance: 2,000; Referees: Perdomo, Araújo (URU)
27 June 2026; 16:15	A. Soumah 6	(14–12)	Zediri 6	City Gymnasium, Jinzhong; Attendance: 2,000; Referees: Perdomo, Araújo (URU)
27 June 2026; 16:15	1× (yellow card) 2× (suspension)	Report	1× (yellow card) 1× (suspension) 1× (red card)	City Gymnasium, Jinzhong; Attendance: 2,000; Referees: Perdomo, Araújo (URU)

27 June 2026; 18:30	Denmark	42–25	China	City Gymnasium, Jinzhong; Attendance: 3,900; Referees: Altmár, Horváth (HUN)
27 June 2026; 18:30	Hoppe 10	(23–13)	Liang 4	City Gymnasium, Jinzhong; Attendance: 3,900; Referees: Altmár, Horváth (HUN)
27 June 2026; 18:30	2× (suspension)	Report	3× (suspension)	City Gymnasium, Jinzhong; Attendance: 3,900; Referees: Altmár, Horváth (HUN)

=== Group F ===
Pos	Team	Pld	W	D	L	GF	GA	GD	Pts	Qualification
1	Montenegro	3	3	0	0	118	75	+43	6	Main round
2	Czech Republic	3	2	0	1	105	76	+29	4	Main round
3	Iceland	3	1	0	2	80	90	−10	2	Presidents Cup
4	United States	3	0	0	3	67	129	−62	0	Presidents Cup

Source: IHF
Rules for classification: 1) points; 2) head-to-head points; 3) head-to-head goal difference; 4) head-to-head number of goals scored; 5) goal difference.

24 June 2026; 11:45	Montenegro	34–24	Iceland	City Gymnasium, Jinzhong; Attendance: 200; Referees: Maia, Nunes (POR)
24 June 2026; 11:45	Savić 6	(20–13)	Traustadóttir 7	City Gymnasium, Jinzhong; Attendance: 200; Referees: Maia, Nunes (POR)
24 June 2026; 11:45	4× (suspension)	Report	1× (yellow card) 5× (suspension)	City Gymnasium, Jinzhong; Attendance: 200; Referees: Maia, Nunes (POR)

24 June 2026; 14:00	Czech Republic	44–21	United States	City Gymnasium, Jinzhong; Attendance: 225; Referees: Abdelkarim, Kedis (EGY)
24 June 2026; 14:00	Filípková 8	(23–8)	Doherty-Dahllöf 13	City Gymnasium, Jinzhong; Attendance: 225; Referees: Abdelkarim, Kedis (EGY)
24 June 2026; 14:00	4× (suspension)	Report	4× (suspension) 1× (red card)	City Gymnasium, Jinzhong; Attendance: 225; Referees: Abdelkarim, Kedis (EGY)

25 June 2026; 11:45	United States	23–52	Montenegro	City Gymnasium, Jinzhong; Referees: Cournil, Lamour (FRA)
25 June 2026; 11:45	Hannevik, Penszki 5	(12–26)	Ramusović 8	City Gymnasium, Jinzhong; Referees: Cournil, Lamour (FRA)
25 June 2026; 11:45	3× (suspension) 1× (red card)	Report	5× (suspension)	City Gymnasium, Jinzhong; Referees: Cournil, Lamour (FRA)

25 June 2026; 14:00	Czech Republic	33–23	Iceland	City Gymnasium, Jinzhong; Attendance: 325; Referees: Nikolovski, Metalari (MKD)
25 June 2026; 14:00	Filípková 7	(16–11)	Eiríksdóttir 8	City Gymnasium, Jinzhong; Attendance: 325; Referees: Nikolovski, Metalari (MKD)
25 June 2026; 14:00	4× (suspension)	Report	1× (yellow card) 4× (suspension)	City Gymnasium, Jinzhong; Attendance: 325; Referees: Nikolovski, Metalari (MKD)

27 June 2026; 11:45	Iceland	33–23	United States	City Gymnasium, Jinzhong; Attendance: 1,200; Referees: Al-Saqer, Al-Suqufi (KSA)
27 June 2026; 11:45	Pálsdóttir, Þórhallsdóttir 7	(12–15)	Da Cruz 8	City Gymnasium, Jinzhong; Attendance: 1,200; Referees: Al-Saqer, Al-Suqufi (KSA)
27 June 2026; 11:45	3× (suspension)	Report	2× (suspension)	City Gymnasium, Jinzhong; Attendance: 1,200; Referees: Al-Saqer, Al-Suqufi (KSA)

27 June 2026; 14:00	Montenegro	32–28	Czech Republic	City Gymnasium, Jinzhong; Attendance: 900; Referees: Thiyagarajah, Thiyagarajah (GER)
27 June 2026; 14:00	Ceklić 9	(16–11)	Filípková, Pejšová 7	City Gymnasium, Jinzhong; Attendance: 900; Referees: Thiyagarajah, Thiyagarajah (GER)
27 June 2026; 14:00	4× (suspension)	Report	2× (suspension)	City Gymnasium, Jinzhong; Attendance: 900; Referees: Thiyagarajah, Thiyagarajah (GER)

=== Group G ===
Pos	Team	Pld	W	D	L	GF	GA	GD	Pts	Qualification
1	Poland	3	3	0	0	86	57	+29	6	Main round
2	Hungary	3	2	0	1	103	61	+42	4	Main round
3	Tunisia	3	1	0	2	76	75	+1	2	Presidents Cup
4	Chinese Taipei	3	0	0	3	37	109	−72	0	Presidents Cup

Source: IHF
Rules for classification: 1) points; 2) head-to-head points; 3) head-to-head goal difference; 4) head-to-head number of goals scored; 5) goal difference.

24 June 2026; 11:45	Hungary	46–10	Chinese Taipei	University Gymnasium, Jinzhong; Attendance: 200; Referees: Cournil, Lamour (FRA)
24 June 2026; 11:45	Kascó, Keceli-Mészáros 7	(24–7)	Hsu 5	University Gymnasium, Jinzhong; Attendance: 200; Referees: Cournil, Lamour (FRA)
24 June 2026; 11:45	3× (suspension)	Report	4× (suspension)	University Gymnasium, Jinzhong; Attendance: 200; Referees: Cournil, Lamour (FRA)

24 June 2026; 14:00	Poland	26–22	Tunisia	University Gymnasium, Jinzhong; Attendance: 220; Referees: Cheng, Zhou (CHN)
24 June 2026; 14:00	Zimnicka 10	(15–10)	Cherif 6	University Gymnasium, Jinzhong; Attendance: 220; Referees: Cheng, Zhou (CHN)
24 June 2026; 14:00	2× (suspension)	Report	3× (suspension)	University Gymnasium, Jinzhong; Attendance: 220; Referees: Cheng, Zhou (CHN)

25 June 2026; 11:45	Tunisia	24–32	Hungary	University Gymnasium, Jinzhong; Attendance: 100; Referees: Paradina, Mikelić (CRO)
25 June 2026; 11:45	Ghoul, Ouni 4	(10–14)	Kriston 6	University Gymnasium, Jinzhong; Attendance: 100; Referees: Paradina, Mikelić (CRO)
25 June 2026; 11:45	6× (suspension)	Report	5× (suspension)	University Gymnasium, Jinzhong; Attendance: 100; Referees: Paradina, Mikelić (CRO)

25 June 2026; 14:00	Poland	33–10	Chinese Taipei	University Gymnasium, Jinzhong; Attendance: 170; Referees: Duplii, Karpushchenko (UKR)
25 June 2026; 14:00	Chwojnicka 6	(14–5)	Chang 3	University Gymnasium, Jinzhong; Attendance: 170; Referees: Duplii, Karpushchenko (UKR)
25 June 2026; 14:00	4× (suspension)	Report	5× (suspension)	University Gymnasium, Jinzhong; Attendance: 170; Referees: Duplii, Karpushchenko (UKR)

27 June 2026; 11:45	Chinese Taipei	17–30	Tunisia	University Gymnasium, Jinzhong; Attendance: 305; Referees: Pepe (ITA), Stancu ( ROU)
27 June 2026; 11:45	Lin C. 6	(6–16)	Yazidi 7	University Gymnasium, Jinzhong; Attendance: 305; Referees: Pepe (ITA), Stancu ( ROU)
27 June 2026; 11:45	5× (suspension)	Report	2× (suspension)	University Gymnasium, Jinzhong; Attendance: 305; Referees: Pepe (ITA), Stancu ( ROU)

27 June 2026; 14:00	Hungary	25–27	Poland	University Gymnasium, Jinzhong; Attendance: 320; Referees: El-Saied, El-Saied (EGY)
27 June 2026; 14:00	Kacsó 8	(8–11)	Zimnicka 12	University Gymnasium, Jinzhong; Attendance: 320; Referees: El-Saied, El-Saied (EGY)
27 June 2026; 14:00	1× (suspension)	Report	5× (suspension)	University Gymnasium, Jinzhong; Attendance: 320; Referees: El-Saied, El-Saied (EGY)

=== Group H ===
Pos	Team	Pld	W	D	L	GF	GA	GD	Pts	Qualification
1	Japan	3	2	0	1	81	72	+9	4 (Note: Japan 26–24 Norway)	Main round
2	Norway	3	2	0	1	78	69	+9	4	Main round
3	Faroe Islands	3	1	0	2	67	81	−14	2 (Note: Faroe Islands 23–22 Croatia)	Presidents Cup
4	Croatia	3	1	0	2	69	73	−4	2	Presidents Cup

Source: IHF
Rules for classification: 1) points; 2) head-to-head points; 3) head-to-head goal difference; 4) head-to-head number of goals scored; 5) goal difference.
Notes:

24 June 2026; 16:15	Croatia	21–27	Norway	University Gymnasium, Jinzhong; Attendance: 230; Referees: Thiyagarajah, Thiyagarajah (GER)
24 June 2026; 16:15	Miklić 8	(11–13)	With 6	University Gymnasium, Jinzhong; Attendance: 230; Referees: Thiyagarajah, Thiyagarajah (GER)
24 June 2026; 16:15	3× (suspension)	Report	2× (suspension)	University Gymnasium, Jinzhong; Attendance: 230; Referees: Thiyagarajah, Thiyagarajah (GER)

24 June 2026; 18:30	Japan	32–22	Faroe Islands	University Gymnasium, Jinzhong; Attendance: 220; Referees: Metalari, Nikolovski (MKD)
24 June 2026; 18:30	Samo 10	(16–11)	Eystberg 6	University Gymnasium, Jinzhong; Attendance: 220; Referees: Metalari, Nikolovski (MKD)
24 June 2026; 18:30	1× (yellow card) 1× (suspension)	Report	2× (suspension)	University Gymnasium, Jinzhong; Attendance: 220; Referees: Metalari, Nikolovski (MKD)

25 June 2026; 16:15	Faroe Islands	23–22	Croatia	University Gymnasium, Jinzhong; Attendance: 120; Referees: Oyarzun, Zaragüeta (ESP)
25 June 2026; 16:15	Eystberg, Joensen 6	(14–11)	Brusić 7	University Gymnasium, Jinzhong; Attendance: 120; Referees: Oyarzun, Zaragüeta (ESP)
25 June 2026; 16:15	4× (suspension)	Report	1× (yellow card) 1× (suspension) 1× (red card)	University Gymnasium, Jinzhong; Attendance: 120; Referees: Oyarzun, Zaragüeta (ESP)

25 June 2026; 18:30	Japan	26–24	Norway	University Gymnasium, Jinzhong; Attendance: 350; Referees: Ismoilov, Ismoilov (UZB)
25 June 2026; 18:30	three players 4	(13–8)	Aalstad 8	University Gymnasium, Jinzhong; Attendance: 350; Referees: Ismoilov, Ismoilov (UZB)
25 June 2026; 18:30	2× (suspension)	Report	1× (suspension)	University Gymnasium, Jinzhong; Attendance: 350; Referees: Ismoilov, Ismoilov (UZB)

27 June 2026; 16:15	Norway	27–22	Faroe Islands	University Gymnasium, Jinzhong; Attendance: 403; Referees: Mikelić, Parađina (CRO)
27 June 2026; 16:15	Leinan 6	(12–10)	Johannensen 6	University Gymnasium, Jinzhong; Attendance: 403; Referees: Mikelić, Parađina (CRO)
27 June 2026; 16:15	1× (yellow card) 4× (suspension)	Report	1× (yellow card) 6× (suspension)	University Gymnasium, Jinzhong; Attendance: 403; Referees: Mikelić, Parađina (CRO)

27 June 2026; 18:30	Croatia	26–23	Japan	University Gymnasium, Jinzhong; Attendance: 380; Referees: Correa, Correa (BRA)
27 June 2026; 18:30	Čičak, Čović 5	(14–11)	Nakamura 4	University Gymnasium, Jinzhong; Attendance: 380; Referees: Correa, Correa (BRA)
27 June 2026; 18:30	2× (suspension)	Report		University Gymnasium, Jinzhong; Attendance: 380; Referees: Correa, Correa (BRA)

== President's Cup ==
Points obtained in the matches against the team from the group are taken over.

=== Group I ===
Pos	Team	Pld	W	D	L	GF	GA	GD	Pts	Qualification
1	Egypt	3	3	0	0	122	58	+64	6	17–20th place semifinals
2	Angola	3	2	0	1	77	51	+26	4	21st–24th place semifinals
3	Paraguay	3	1	0	2	56	91	−35	2	25–28th place semifinals
4	India	3	0	0	3	62	117	−55	0	29th–32nd place semifinals

Source: IHF
Rules for classification: 1) points; 2) head-to-head points; 3) head-to-head goal difference; 4) head-to-head number of goals scored; 5) goal difference.

29 June 2026; 11:45	Egypt	40–17	Paraguay	Vocational & Technical College Gymnasium, Jinzhong; Attendance: 150; Referees: Berdić, Šorak (SRB)
29 June 2026; 11:45	S. Mahmoud 10	(19–6)	Ramírez 6	Vocational & Technical College Gymnasium, Jinzhong; Attendance: 150; Referees: Berdić, Šorak (SRB)
29 June 2026; 11:45	3× (suspension)	Report	2× (suspension)	Vocational & Technical College Gymnasium, Jinzhong; Attendance: 150; Referees: Berdić, Šorak (SRB)

29 June 2026; 14:00	Angola	33–14	India	Vocational & Technical College Gymnasium, Jinzhong; Attendance: 50; Referees: Cournil, Lamour (FRA)
29 June 2026; 14:00	Nunda 9	(13–5)	Devi 7	Vocational & Technical College Gymnasium, Jinzhong; Attendance: 50; Referees: Cournil, Lamour (FRA)
29 June 2026; 14:00	6× (suspension) 1× (red card)	Report	1× (yellow card)	Vocational & Technical College Gymnasium, Jinzhong; Attendance: 50; Referees: Cournil, Lamour (FRA)

30 June 2026; 11:45	Egypt	26–20	Angola	Vocational & Technical College Gymnasium, Jinzhong; Attendance: 150; Referees: Gheisarian, Gheisarian (IRI)
30 June 2026; 11:45	Mohamed 8	(15–10)	Cateco 8	Vocational & Technical College Gymnasium, Jinzhong; Attendance: 150; Referees: Gheisarian, Gheisarian (IRI)
30 June 2026; 11:45	1× (yellow card) 1× (suspension)	Report	4× (suspension)	Vocational & Technical College Gymnasium, Jinzhong; Attendance: 150; Referees: Gheisarian, Gheisarian (IRI)

30 June 2026; 14:00	India	27–28	Paraguay	Vocational & Technical College Gymnasium, Jinzhong; Attendance: 300; Referees: Al-Saqer, Al-Suqufi (KSA)
30 June 2026; 14:00	Devi 13	(15–15)	Parra 8	Vocational & Technical College Gymnasium, Jinzhong; Attendance: 300; Referees: Al-Saqer, Al-Suqufi (KSA)
30 June 2026; 14:00	1× (suspension) 1× (red card)	Report	4× (suspension)	Vocational & Technical College Gymnasium, Jinzhong; Attendance: 300; Referees: Al-Saqer, Al-Suqufi (KSA)

=== Group II ===
Pos	Team	Pld	W	D	L	GF	GA	GD	Pts	Qualification
1	Brazil	3	2	1	0	83	58	+25	5 (Note: Tied on head-to-head result (Brazil 18–18 Argentina). Overall goal difference was used as the tiebreaker.)	17–20th place semifinals
2	Argentina	3	2	1	0	77	53	+24	5	21st–24th place semifinals
3	Turkey	3	1	0	2	88	73	+15	2	25–28th place semifinals
4	Canada	3	0	0	3	43	107	−64	0	29th–32nd place semifinals

Source: IHF
Rules for classification: 1) points; 2) head-to-head points; 3) head-to-head goal difference; 4) head-to-head number of goals scored; 5) goal difference.
Notes:

29 June 2026; 11:45	Brazil	26–24	Turkey	Shanxi Medical University Zhongdu Campus Gymnasium, Jinzhong; Attendance: 80; Referees: Ismoilov, Ismoilov (UZB)
29 June 2026; 11:45	Nunes 9	(14–11)	Durdu 5	Shanxi Medical University Zhongdu Campus Gymnasium, Jinzhong; Attendance: 80; Referees: Ismoilov, Ismoilov (UZB)
29 June 2026; 11:45	5× (suspension)	Report	1× (suspension)	Shanxi Medical University Zhongdu Campus Gymnasium, Jinzhong; Attendance: 80; Referees: Ismoilov, Ismoilov (UZB)

29 June 2026; 14:00	Argentina	30–9	Canada	Shanxi Medical University Zhongdu Campus Gymnasium, Jinzhong; Attendance: 100; Referees: Al Saqer, Al Suqufi (KSA)
29 June 2026; 14:00	Ares 7	(14–5)	three players 2	Shanxi Medical University Zhongdu Campus Gymnasium, Jinzhong; Attendance: 100; Referees: Al Saqer, Al Suqufi (KSA)
29 June 2026; 14:00	2× (suspension)	Report	4× (suspension)	Shanxi Medical University Zhongdu Campus Gymnasium, Jinzhong; Attendance: 100; Referees: Al Saqer, Al Suqufi (KSA)

30 June 2026; 11:45	Brazil	18–18	Argentina	Shanxi Medical University Zhongdu Campus Gymnasium, Jinzhong; Attendance: 120; Referees: Cournil, Lamour (FRA)
30 June 2026; 11:45	De Castro 6	(9–10)	Patrone 4	Shanxi Medical University Zhongdu Campus Gymnasium, Jinzhong; Attendance: 120; Referees: Cournil, Lamour (FRA)
30 June 2026; 11:45	6× (suspension)	Report	5× (suspension)	Shanxi Medical University Zhongdu Campus Gymnasium, Jinzhong; Attendance: 120; Referees: Cournil, Lamour (FRA)

30 June 2026; 14:00	Canada	18–38	Turkey	Shanxi Medical University Zhongdu Campus Gymnasium, Jinzhong; Attendance: 120; Referees: Duplii, Karpushchenko (UKR)
30 June 2026; 14:00	Botarel, Vrdoljak 4	(6–20)	Muhcu 7	Shanxi Medical University Zhongdu Campus Gymnasium, Jinzhong; Attendance: 120; Referees: Duplii, Karpushchenko (UKR)
30 June 2026; 14:00	3× (suspension)	Report	3× (suspension)	Shanxi Medical University Zhongdu Campus Gymnasium, Jinzhong; Attendance: 120; Referees: Duplii, Karpushchenko (UKR)

=== Group III ===
Pos	Team	Pld	W	D	L	GF	GA	GD	Pts	Qualification
1	Iceland	3	3	0	0	97	66	+31	6	17–20th place semifinals
2	Algeria	3	2	0	1	77	80	−3	4	21st–24th place semifinals
3	Guinea	3	1	0	2	67	72	−5	2	25–28th place semifinals
4	United States	3	0	0	3	66	89	−23	0	29th–32nd place semifinals

Source: IHF
Rules for classification: 1) points; 2) head-to-head points; 3) head-to-head goal difference; 4) head-to-head number of goals scored; 5) goal difference.

29 June 2026; 11:45	Algeria	30–26	United States	City Gymnasium, Jinzhong; Attendance: 425; Referees: Pepe (ITA), Stancu ( ROU)
29 June 2026; 11:45	Yelles 12	(16–12)	Doherty-Dahllöf 10	City Gymnasium, Jinzhong; Attendance: 425; Referees: Pepe (ITA), Stancu ( ROU)
29 June 2026; 11:45	2× (suspension)	Report	4× (suspension)	City Gymnasium, Jinzhong; Attendance: 425; Referees: Pepe (ITA), Stancu ( ROU)

29 June 2026; 14:00	Iceland	31–20	Guinea	City Gymnasium, Jinzhong; Referees: Ben Dahou, Zoghlami (TUN)
29 June 2026; 14:00	Traustadóttir 11	(15–7)	Mansaré 8	City Gymnasium, Jinzhong; Referees: Ben Dahou, Zoghlami (TUN)
29 June 2026; 14:00	5× (suspension)	Report	4× (suspension)	City Gymnasium, Jinzhong; Referees: Ben Dahou, Zoghlami (TUN)

30 June 2026; 11:45	Algeria	23–33	Iceland	City Gymnasium, Jinzhong; Attendance: 400; Referees: Mikelić, Paradina (CRO)
30 June 2026; 11:45	Mansouri, Yelles 6	(10–17)	Þórhallsdóttir 10	City Gymnasium, Jinzhong; Attendance: 400; Referees: Mikelić, Paradina (CRO)
30 June 2026; 11:45	4× (suspension)	Report	7× (suspension) 1× (red card)	City Gymnasium, Jinzhong; Attendance: 400; Referees: Mikelić, Paradina (CRO)

30 June 2026; 14:00	Guinea	26–17	United States	City Gymnasium, Jinzhong; Attendance: 425; Referees: Ismoilov, Ismoilov (UZB)
30 June 2026; 14:00	A. Diallo 7	(16–10)	Doherty-Dahllöf 7	City Gymnasium, Jinzhong; Attendance: 425; Referees: Ismoilov, Ismoilov (UZB)
30 June 2026; 14:00	9× (suspension)	Report	3× (suspension) 1× (red card)	City Gymnasium, Jinzhong; Attendance: 425; Referees: Ismoilov, Ismoilov (UZB)

=== Group IV ===
Pos	Team	Pld	W	D	L	GF	GA	GD	Pts	Qualification
1	Croatia	3	2	0	1	87	60	+27	4 (Note: Head-to-head goal difference: Croatia +10, Faroe Islands −3, Tunisia −7)	17–20th place semifinals
2	Faroe Islands	3	2	0	1	78	74	+4	4	21st–24th place semifinals
3	Tunisia	3	2	0	1	80	74	+6	4	25–28th place semifinals
4	Chinese Taipei	3	0	0	3	56	93	−37	0	29th–32nd place semifinals

Source: IHF
Rules for classification: 1) points; 2) head-to-head points; 3) head-to-head goal difference; 4) head-to-head number of goals scored; 5) goal difference.
Notes:

29 June 2026; 11:45	Tunisia	21–32	Croatia	University Gymnasium, Jinzhong; Attendance: 112; Referees: Gheisarian, Gheisarian (IRI)
29 June 2026; 11:45	Ben Ameur, Ouni 5	(10–14)	Brusić 7	University Gymnasium, Jinzhong; Attendance: 112; Referees: Gheisarian, Gheisarian (IRI)
29 June 2026; 11:45	3× (suspension)	Report	3× (suspension)	University Gymnasium, Jinzhong; Attendance: 112; Referees: Gheisarian, Gheisarian (IRI)

29 June 2026; 14:00	Faroe Islands	30–23	Chinese Taipei	University Gymnasium, Jinzhong; Attendance: 130; Referees: Abdelkarim, Kedis (EGY)
29 June 2026; 14:00	Eystberg 8	(17–10)	Lin C. 7	University Gymnasium, Jinzhong; Attendance: 130; Referees: Abdelkarim, Kedis (EGY)
29 June 2026; 14:00	2× (suspension)	Report	4× (suspension)	University Gymnasium, Jinzhong; Attendance: 130; Referees: Abdelkarim, Kedis (EGY)

30 June 2026; 11:45	Tunisia	29–25	Faroe Islands	University Gymnasium, Jinzhong; Attendance: 92; Referees: Berdić, Šorak (CRO)
30 June 2026; 11:45	Ouni 8	(15–10)	Eystberg 8	University Gymnasium, Jinzhong; Attendance: 92; Referees: Berdić, Šorak (CRO)
30 June 2026; 11:45	5× (suspension)	Report	4× (suspension)	University Gymnasium, Jinzhong; Attendance: 92; Referees: Berdić, Šorak (CRO)

30 June 2026; 14:00	Chinese Taipei	16–33	Croatia	University Gymnasium, Jinzhong; Attendance: 370; Referees: Fremstad, Jørstad (NOR)
30 June 2026; 14:00	Lin C. 6	(9–18)	Brusić 6	University Gymnasium, Jinzhong; Attendance: 370; Referees: Fremstad, Jørstad (NOR)
30 June 2026; 14:00	3× (suspension)	Report	1× (yellow card) 2× (suspension)	University Gymnasium, Jinzhong; Attendance: 370; Referees: Fremstad, Jørstad (NOR)

== Main round ==
Points obtained in the matches against the team from the group are taken over.

=== Group I ===
Pos	Team	Pld	W	D	L	GF	GA	GD	Pts	Qualification
1	France	3	3	0	0	84	64	+20	6	Quarterfinals
2	Serbia	3	2	0	1	72	81	−9	4	Quarterfinals
3	Sweden	3	1	0	2	74	68	+6	2	9–12th place semifinals
4	Austria	3	0	0	3	70	87	−17	0	13–16th place semifinals

Source: IHF
Rules for classification: 1) points; 2) head-to-head points; 3) head-to-head goal difference; 4) head-to-head number of goals scored; 5) goal difference.

29 June 2026; 20:45	France	29–23	Austria	Jinzhong City Gymnasium, Jinzhong; Attendance: 520; Referees: Altmár, Horváth (HUN)
29 June 2026; 20:45	Abdou 7	(13–12)	Chroust 8	Jinzhong City Gymnasium, Jinzhong; Attendance: 520; Referees: Altmár, Horváth (HUN)
29 June 2026; 20:45	5× (suspension)	Report	6× (suspension)	Jinzhong City Gymnasium, Jinzhong; Attendance: 520; Referees: Altmár, Horváth (HUN)

29 June 2026; 20:45	Serbia	24–23	Sweden	Shanxi Medical University Zhongdu Campus Gymnasium, Jinzhong; Attendance: 700; Referees: Thiyagarajah, Thiyagarajah (GER)
29 June 2026; 20:45	Otašević 6	(10–15)	Lundvall 6	Shanxi Medical University Zhongdu Campus Gymnasium, Jinzhong; Attendance: 700; Referees: Thiyagarajah, Thiyagarajah (GER)
29 June 2026; 20:45	3× (suspension) 1× (red card)	Report	6× (suspension) 1× (red card)	Shanxi Medical University Zhongdu Campus Gymnasium, Jinzhong; Attendance: 700; Referees: Thiyagarajah, Thiyagarajah (GER)

30 June 2026; 16:15	France	31–19	Serbia	Vocational & Technical College Gymnasium, Jinzhong; Attendance: 800; Referees: Oyarzun, Zaragüeta (ESP)
30 June 2026; 16:15	Kingue 7	(17–14)	Nedeljković 5	Vocational & Technical College Gymnasium, Jinzhong; Attendance: 800; Referees: Oyarzun, Zaragüeta (ESP)
30 June 2026; 16:15	1× (suspension)	Report	1× (suspension)	Vocational & Technical College Gymnasium, Jinzhong; Attendance: 800; Referees: Oyarzun, Zaragüeta (ESP)

30 June 2026; 18:30	Sweden	29–20	Austria	Vocational & Technical College Gymnasium, Jinzhong; Attendance: 800; Referees: Al-Enezi, Al-Naseem (KUW)
30 June 2026; 18:30	Börjesson 6	(15–10)	Maticević 8	Vocational & Technical College Gymnasium, Jinzhong; Attendance: 800; Referees: Al-Enezi, Al-Naseem (KUW)
30 June 2026; 18:30	4× (suspension)	Report	6× (suspension)	Vocational & Technical College Gymnasium, Jinzhong; Attendance: 800; Referees: Al-Enezi, Al-Naseem (KUW)

=== Group II ===
Pos	Team	Pld	W	D	L	GF	GA	GD	Pts	Qualification
1	Germany	3	3	0	0	106	81	+25	6	Quarterfinals
2	Spain	3	2	0	1	92	74	+18	4	Quarterfinals
3	Romania	3	1	0	2	82	91	−9	2	9–12th place semifinals
4	South Korea	3	0	0	3	64	98	−34	0	13–16th place semifinals

Source: IHF
Rules for classification: 1) points; 2) head-to-head points; 3) head-to-head goal difference; 4) head-to-head number of goals scored; 5) goal difference.

29 June 2026; 16:15	Germany	40–22	South Korea	Shanxi Medical University Zhongdu Campus Gymnasium, Jinzhong; Attendance: 550; Referees: El-Saied, El-Saied (EGY)
29 June 2026; 16:15	Bornhardt, Kern 6	(16–12)	Suh, Choi 5	Shanxi Medical University Zhongdu Campus Gymnasium, Jinzhong; Attendance: 550; Referees: El-Saied, El-Saied (EGY)
29 June 2026; 16:15	4× (suspension)	Report	2× (yellow card) 3× (suspension)	Shanxi Medical University Zhongdu Campus Gymnasium, Jinzhong; Attendance: 550; Referees: El-Saied, El-Saied (EGY)

29 June 2026; 18:30	Spain	32–25	Romania	Shanxi Medical University Zhongdu Campus Gymnasium, Jinzhong; Attendance: 680; Referees: Correa, Correa (BRA)
29 June 2026; 18:30	B. Rodríguez 10	(14–15)	Damian 5	Shanxi Medical University Zhongdu Campus Gymnasium, Jinzhong; Attendance: 680; Referees: Correa, Correa (BRA)
29 June 2026; 18:30	1× (suspension)	Report	1× (yellow card) 4× (suspension)	Shanxi Medical University Zhongdu Campus Gymnasium, Jinzhong; Attendance: 680; Referees: Correa, Correa (BRA)

30 June 2026; 16:15	Germany	29–28	Spain	Shanxi Medical University Zhongdu Campus Gymnasium, Jinzhong; Attendance: 820; Referees: Metalari, Nikolovski (MKD)
30 June 2026; 16:15	Bornhardt, Rohr 5	(13–18)	three players 4	Shanxi Medical University Zhongdu Campus Gymnasium, Jinzhong; Attendance: 820; Referees: Metalari, Nikolovski (MKD)
30 June 2026; 16:15	1× (yellow card) 4× (suspension) 1× (red card)	Report	1× (suspension)	Shanxi Medical University Zhongdu Campus Gymnasium, Jinzhong; Attendance: 820; Referees: Metalari, Nikolovski (MKD)

30 June 2026; 18:30	Romania	26–22	South Korea	Shanxi Medical University Zhongdu Campus Gymnasium, Jinzhong; Attendance: 650; Referees: Cheng, Zhou (CHN)
30 June 2026; 18:30	Voicu 5	(16–10)	Suh 7	Shanxi Medical University Zhongdu Campus Gymnasium, Jinzhong; Attendance: 650; Referees: Cheng, Zhou (CHN)
30 June 2026; 18:30	2× (suspension)	Report	5× (suspension)	Shanxi Medical University Zhongdu Campus Gymnasium, Jinzhong; Attendance: 650; Referees: Cheng, Zhou (CHN)

=== Group III ===
Pos	Team	Pld	W	D	L	GF	GA	GD	Pts	Qualification
1	Denmark	3	2	1	0	114	75	+39	5 (Note: Tied on head-to-head result (Denmark 32–32 Montenegro). Overall goal difference was used as the tiebreaker.)	Quarterfinals
2	Montenegro	3	2	1	0	95	85	+10	5	Quarterfinals
3	Czech Republic	3	1	0	2	82	101	−19	2	9–12th place semifinals
4	China (H)	3	0	0	3	79	109	−30	0	13–16th place semifinals

Source: IHF
Rules for classification: 1) points; 2) head-to-head points; 3) head-to-head goal difference; 4) head-to-head number of goals scored; 5) goal difference.
(H) Hosts
Notes:

29 June 2026; 16:15	Denmark	40–18	Czech Republic	City Gymnasium, Jinzhong; Attendance: 1,100; Referees: Oyarzun, Zaragüeta (ESP)
29 June 2026; 16:15	Hoppe 12	(15–8)	Filípková 5	City Gymnasium, Jinzhong; Attendance: 1,100; Referees: Oyarzun, Zaragüeta (ESP)
29 June 2026; 16:15	2× (suspension)	Report	2× (suspension)	City Gymnasium, Jinzhong; Attendance: 1,100; Referees: Oyarzun, Zaragüeta (ESP)

29 June 2026; 18:30	Montenegro	31–25	China	City Gymnasium, Jinzhong; Attendance: 3,600; Referees: Fremstad, Jørstad (NOR)
29 June 2026; 18:30	Ceklić 7	(13–14)	Liang 9	City Gymnasium, Jinzhong; Attendance: 3,600; Referees: Fremstad, Jørstad (NOR)
29 June 2026; 18:30	4× (suspension)	Report	7× (suspension) 1× (red card)	City Gymnasium, Jinzhong; Attendance: 3,600; Referees: Fremstad, Jørstad (NOR)

30 June 2026; 16:15	Denmark	32–32	Montenegro	City Gymnasium, Jinzhong; Attendance: 1,250; Referees: Pepe (ITA), Stancu ( ROU)
30 June 2026; 16:15	Jensen, Nørskov 6	(16–16)	Knežević, Savić 7	City Gymnasium, Jinzhong; Attendance: 1,250; Referees: Pepe (ITA), Stancu ( ROU)
30 June 2026; 16:15	2× (suspension)	Report	1× (yellow card) 5× (suspension)	City Gymnasium, Jinzhong; Attendance: 1,250; Referees: Pepe (ITA), Stancu ( ROU)

30 June 2026; 18:30	China	29–36	Czech Republic	City Gymnasium, Jinzhong; Attendance: 4,100; Referees: Abdelkarim, Kedis (EGY)
30 June 2026; 18:30	Pan 10	(10–17)	Krapková, Vrbková 7	City Gymnasium, Jinzhong; Attendance: 4,100; Referees: Abdelkarim, Kedis (EGY)
30 June 2026; 18:30	5× (suspension)	Report	4× (suspension)	City Gymnasium, Jinzhong; Attendance: 4,100; Referees: Abdelkarim, Kedis (EGY)

=== Group IV ===
Pos	Team	Pld	W	D	L	GF	GA	GD	Pts	Qualification
1	Japan	3	2	0	1	73	74	−1	4 (Note: Head-to-head result: Japan 26–24 Norway)	Quarterfinals
2	Norway	3	2	0	1	83	76	+7	4	Quarterfinals
3	Poland	3	1	0	2	68	76	−8	2 (Note: Head-to-head result: Poland 27–25 Hungary)	9–12th place semifinals
4	Hungary	3	1	0	2	84	82	+2	2	13–16th place semifinals

Source: IHF
Rules for classification: 1) points; 2) head-to-head points; 3) head-to-head goal difference; 4) head-to-head number of goals scored; 5) goal difference.
Notes:

29 June 2026; 16:15	Poland	23–29	Norway	University Gymnasium, Jinzhong; Attendance: 210; Referees: Maia, Nunes (POR)
29 June 2026; 16:15	Zimnicka 5	(14–14)	Breen 9	University Gymnasium, Jinzhong; Attendance: 210; Referees: Maia, Nunes (POR)
29 June 2026; 16:15		Report	2× (suspension)	University Gymnasium, Jinzhong; Attendance: 210; Referees: Maia, Nunes (POR)

29 June 2026; 18:30	Japan	25–32	Hungary	University Gymnasium, Jinzhong; Attendance: 235; Referees: Araújo, Perdomo (URU)
29 June 2026; 18:30	Samo 6	(13–15)	Keceli-Mészáros 6	University Gymnasium, Jinzhong; Attendance: 235; Referees: Araújo, Perdomo (URU)
29 June 2026; 18:30	1× (suspension)	Report	1× (suspension)	University Gymnasium, Jinzhong; Attendance: 235; Referees: Araújo, Perdomo (URU)

30 June 2026; 16:15	Poland	18–22	Japan	University Gymnasium, Jinzhong; Attendance: 305; Referees: Nygaard, Primdahl (DEN)
30 June 2026; 16:15	Zimnicka 5	(10–13)	Ikeda 5	University Gymnasium, Jinzhong; Attendance: 305; Referees: Nygaard, Primdahl (DEN)
30 June 2026; 16:15	1× (yellow card) 1× (suspension)	Report	3× (suspension)	University Gymnasium, Jinzhong; Attendance: 305; Referees: Nygaard, Primdahl (DEN)

30 June 2026; 18:30	Hungary	27–30	Norway	University Gymnasium, Jinzhong; Attendance: 490; Referees: Correa, Correa (BRA)
30 June 2026; 18:30	Fazekas 6	(15–14)	Aalstad 12	University Gymnasium, Jinzhong; Attendance: 490; Referees: Correa, Correa (BRA)
30 June 2026; 18:30	2× (suspension)	Report	3× (suspension)	University Gymnasium, Jinzhong; Attendance: 490; Referees: Correa, Correa (BRA)

== Placement matches ==
=== 29th place bracket ===
29–32nd place semifinals
2 July
India	36
United States	43
2 July
Canada	24
Chinese Taipei	36

29th place game
3 July
United States (Pen)	34 (3)
Chinese Taipei	34 (1)
31st place game
3 July
India	36
Canada	42

==== 29th–32nd place semifinals ====
2 July 2026; 11:45	India	36–43	United States	University Gymnasium, Jinzhong; Attendance: 127; Referees: Altmár, Horváth (HUN)
2 July 2026; 11:45	Sujata 15	(16–24)	Doherty-Dahllöf 11	University Gymnasium, Jinzhong; Attendance: 127; Referees: Altmár, Horváth (HUN)
2 July 2026; 11:45	1× (suspension)	Report	5× (suspension)	University Gymnasium, Jinzhong; Attendance: 127; Referees: Altmár, Horváth (HUN)

2 July 2026; 14:00	Canada	24–36	Chinese Taipei	University Gymnasium, Jinzhong; Attendance: 237; Referees: Oyarzun, Zaragüeta (ESP)
2 July 2026; 14:00	Botarel 6	(14–19)	Lin C. 9	University Gymnasium, Jinzhong; Attendance: 237; Referees: Oyarzun, Zaragüeta (ESP)
2 July 2026; 14:00	2× (suspension)	Report	3× (suspension)	University Gymnasium, Jinzhong; Attendance: 237; Referees: Oyarzun, Zaragüeta (ESP)

==== 31st place game ====
3 July 2026; 11:45	India	36–42	Canada	University Gymnasium, Jinzhong; Attendance: 120; Referees: Thiyagarajah, Thiyagarajah (GER)
3 July 2026; 11:45	Devi, Sujata 9	(17–19)	Botarel 11	University Gymnasium, Jinzhong; Attendance: 120; Referees: Thiyagarajah, Thiyagarajah (GER)
3 July 2026; 11:45	1× (suspension)	Report	1× (yellow card) 2× (suspension)	University Gymnasium, Jinzhong; Attendance: 120; Referees: Thiyagarajah, Thiyagarajah (GER)

==== 29th place game ====
3 July 2026
14:00
United States
37–35
Chinese Taipei
University Gymnasium, Jinzhong
Attendance: 310
Referees: Ban Dahou, Zoghlami (TUN)
Da Cruz 14
(19–20)
Lin C. 12
2× (suspension)
Report
6× (suspension) 1× (red card)

FT: 34–34 Pen: 3–1

=== 25th place bracket ===
25–28th place semifinals
2 July
Paraguay	23
Guinea	13
2 July
Turkey	31
Tunisia	28

25th place game
3 July
Paraguay	22
Turkey	27
27th place game
3 July
Guinea	25
Tunisia	34

==== 25–28th place semifinals ====
2 July 2026; 16:15	Paraguay	23–13	Guinea	University Gymnasium, Jinzhong; Attendance: 206; Referees: Duplii, Karpushchenko (UKR)
2 July 2026; 16:15	Ramírez 9	(11–7)	three player 3	University Gymnasium, Jinzhong; Attendance: 206; Referees: Duplii, Karpushchenko (UKR)
2 July 2026; 16:15	2× (suspension)	Report	4× (suspension)	University Gymnasium, Jinzhong; Attendance: 206; Referees: Duplii, Karpushchenko (UKR)

2 July 2026; 18:30	Turkey	31–28	Tunisia	University Gymnasium, Jinzhong; Attendance: 313; Referees: Maia, Nunes (POR)
2 July 2026; 18:30	Muhcu, Seven 6	(14–12)	Cherif 8	University Gymnasium, Jinzhong; Attendance: 313; Referees: Maia, Nunes (POR)
2 July 2026; 18:30	4× (suspension) 1× (red card)	Report	4× (suspension)	University Gymnasium, Jinzhong; Attendance: 313; Referees: Maia, Nunes (POR)

==== 27th place game ====
3 July 2026; 16:15	Guinea	25–34	Tunisia	University Gymnasium, Jinzhong; Attendance: 190; Referees: Nygaard, Primdahl (DEN)
3 July 2026; 16:15	F. Soumah 9	(11–15)	Yazidi 7	University Gymnasium, Jinzhong; Attendance: 190; Referees: Nygaard, Primdahl (DEN)
3 July 2026; 16:15	8× (suspension)	Report	3× (suspension)	University Gymnasium, Jinzhong; Attendance: 190; Referees: Nygaard, Primdahl (DEN)

==== 25th place game ====
3 July 2026; 18:30	Paraguay	22–27	Turkey	University Gymnasium, Jinzhong; Attendance: 270; Referees: Abdelkarim, Kedis (EGY)
3 July 2026; 18:30	Parra 7	(12–11)	Seven 8	University Gymnasium, Jinzhong; Attendance: 270; Referees: Abdelkarim, Kedis (EGY)
3 July 2026; 18:30	1× (yellow card) 3× (suspension)	Report	4× (suspension)	University Gymnasium, Jinzhong; Attendance: 270; Referees: Abdelkarim, Kedis (EGY)

=== 21st place bracket ===
21st–24th place semifinals
2 July
Angola	27
Algeria	16
2 July
Argentina	30
Faroe Islands	24

21st place game
3 July
Angola	25 (2)
Argentina (Pen)	25 (3)
23rd place game
3 July
Algeria	23
Faroe Islands	40

==== 21st–24th place semifinals ====
2 July 2026; 11:45	Angola	27–16	Algeria	Shanxi Medical University Zhongdu Campus Gymnasium, Jinzhong; Attendance: 80; Referees: Cheng, Zhou (CHN)
2 July 2026; 11:45	Ambrósio 6	(12–9)	Zediri 4	Shanxi Medical University Zhongdu Campus Gymnasium, Jinzhong; Attendance: 80; Referees: Cheng, Zhou (CHN)
2 July 2026; 11:45	3× (suspension)	Report	2× (suspension)	Shanxi Medical University Zhongdu Campus Gymnasium, Jinzhong; Attendance: 80; Referees: Cheng, Zhou (CHN)

2 July 2026; 14:00	Argentina	30–24	Faroe Islands	Shanxi Medical University Zhongdu Campus Gymnasium, Jinzhong; Attendance: 150; Referees: Al-Saqer, Al-Suqufi (KSA)
2 July 2026; 14:00	Molina 11	(17–12)	Eystberg 13	Shanxi Medical University Zhongdu Campus Gymnasium, Jinzhong; Attendance: 150; Referees: Al-Saqer, Al-Suqufi (KSA)
2 July 2026; 14:00	5× (suspension)	Report	3× (suspension)	Shanxi Medical University Zhongdu Campus Gymnasium, Jinzhong; Attendance: 150; Referees: Al-Saqer, Al-Suqufi (KSA)

==== 23rd place game ====
3 July 2026; 11:45	Algeria	23–40	Faroe Islands	Shanxi Medical University Zhongdu Campus Gymnasium, Jinzhong; Attendance: 120; Referees: Araújo, Perdomo (URU)
3 July 2026; 11:45	Berkani 9	(15–23)	Joensen 9	Shanxi Medical University Zhongdu Campus Gymnasium, Jinzhong; Attendance: 120; Referees: Araújo, Perdomo (URU)
3 July 2026; 11:45	2× (suspension)	Report	2× (suspension)	Shanxi Medical University Zhongdu Campus Gymnasium, Jinzhong; Attendance: 120; Referees: Araújo, Perdomo (URU)

==== 21st place game ====
3 July 2026
14:00
Angola
27–28
Argentina
Shanxi Medical University Zhongdu Campus Gymnasium, Jinzhong
Attendance: 100
Referees: Mikelić, Paradina (CRO)
Manuel 6
(9–17)
Molina 6
6× (suspension) 1× (red card)
Report
2× (suspension)

FT: 25–25 Pen: 2–3

=== 17th place bracket ===
17–20th place semifinals
2 July
Egypt	33
Iceland	26
2 July
Brazil	32
Croatia (Pen)	33

17th place game
3 July
Egypt	26
Croatia	29
19th place game
3 July
Iceland	30
Brazil	27

==== 17–20th place semifinals ====
2 July 2026; 16:15	Egypt	33–26	Iceland	Shanxi Medical University Zhongdu Campus Gymnasium, Jinzhong; Attendance: 180; Referees: Metalari, Nikolovski (MKD)
2 July 2026; 16:15	El-Sheref 7	(17–12)	Þórhallsdóttir, Viktorsdóttir 5	Shanxi Medical University Zhongdu Campus Gymnasium, Jinzhong; Attendance: 180; Referees: Metalari, Nikolovski (MKD)
2 July 2026; 16:15	3× (suspension)	Report	2× (suspension)	Shanxi Medical University Zhongdu Campus Gymnasium, Jinzhong; Attendance: 180; Referees: Metalari, Nikolovski (MKD)

2 July 2026
18:30
Brazil
32–33
Croatia
Shanxi Medical University Zhongdu Campus Gymnasium, Jinzhong
Attendance: 500
Referees: Ben Dahou, Zoghlami (TUN)
Martins 7
(13–13)
Miklić 8
4× (suspension)
Report
4× (suspension)

FT: 26–26 Pen: 6–7

==== 19th place game ====
3 July 2026; 16:15	Iceland	30–27	Brazil	Shanxi Medical University Zhongdu Campus Gymnasium, Jinzhong; Attendance: 290; Referees: Cheng, Zhou (CHN)
3 July 2026; 16:15	Þórhallsdóttir 10	(15–14)	Vitor 10	Shanxi Medical University Zhongdu Campus Gymnasium, Jinzhong; Attendance: 290; Referees: Cheng, Zhou (CHN)
3 July 2026; 16:15	1× (suspension)	Report	4× (suspension)	Shanxi Medical University Zhongdu Campus Gymnasium, Jinzhong; Attendance: 290; Referees: Cheng, Zhou (CHN)

==== 17th place game ====
3 July 2026; 18:30	Egypt	26–29	Croatia	Shanxi Medical University Zhongdu Campus Gymnasium, Jinzhong; Attendance: 780; Referees: Cournil, Lamour (FRA)
3 July 2026; 18:30	Waled 7	(11–12)	Brusić 14	Shanxi Medical University Zhongdu Campus Gymnasium, Jinzhong; Attendance: 780; Referees: Cournil, Lamour (FRA)
3 July 2026; 18:30	1× (yellow card) 3× (suspension)	Report	1× (yellow card) 6× (suspension)	Shanxi Medical University Zhongdu Campus Gymnasium, Jinzhong; Attendance: 780; Referees: Cournil, Lamour (FRA)

=== 13–16th place bracket ===
13–16th place semifinals
2 July
Austria	22 (0)
China (Pen)	22 (3)
2 July
South Korea	25
Hungary	34

13th place game
3 July
China	25
Hungary	35
15th place game
3 July
Austria	29
South Korea	27

==== 13–16th place semifinals ====
2 July 2026; 11:30	South Korea	25–34	Hungary	City Gymnasium, Jinzhong; Attendance: 610; Referees: Al-Enezi, Al-Nassem (KUW)
2 July 2026; 11:30	Suh 9	(7–17)	Keceli-Mészáros 7	City Gymnasium, Jinzhong; Attendance: 610; Referees: Al-Enezi, Al-Nassem (KUW)
2 July 2026; 11:30	7× (suspension)	Report	4× (suspension) 1× (red card)	City Gymnasium, Jinzhong; Attendance: 610; Referees: Al-Enezi, Al-Nassem (KUW)

2 July 2026
13:45
Austria
22–25
China
City Gymnasium, Jinzhong
Attendance: 3,800
Referees: Berdić, Šorak (SRB)
Matičević, Neunteufel 4
(15–13)
Zhang 9
5× (suspension)
Report
3× (suspension) 1× (red card)

FT: 22–22 Pen: 0–3

==== 15th place game ====
3 July 2026; 11:30	Austria	29–27	South Korea	City Gymnasium, Jinzhong; Attendance: 350; Referees: Gheisarian, Gheisarian (IRI)
3 July 2026; 11:30	Provin 8	(15–12)	Kim J. 7	City Gymnasium, Jinzhong; Attendance: 350; Referees: Gheisarian, Gheisarian (IRI)
3 July 2026; 11:30	5× (suspension) 1× (red card)	Report	6× (suspension)	City Gymnasium, Jinzhong; Attendance: 350; Referees: Gheisarian, Gheisarian (IRI)

==== 13th place game ====
3 July 2026; 13:45	China	25–35	Hungary	City Gymnasium, Jinzhong; Attendance: 3,600; Referees: Ismoilov, Ismoilov (UZB)
3 July 2026; 13:45	Cheng, Liang 6	(11–16)	Kacsó, Pálmai 8	City Gymnasium, Jinzhong; Attendance: 3,600; Referees: Ismoilov, Ismoilov (UZB)
3 July 2026; 13:45	5× (suspension)	Report	1× (suspension)	City Gymnasium, Jinzhong; Attendance: 3,600; Referees: Ismoilov, Ismoilov (UZB)

=== 9–12th place bracket ===
9–12th place semifinals
2 July
Sweden	30
Czech Republic	21
2 July
Romania	24
Poland	25

Ninth place game
3 July
Sweden	29
Poland	22
Eleventh place game
3 July
Czech Republic	32
Romania	37

==== 9–12th place semifinals ====
2 July 2026; 11:30	Sweden	30–21	Czech Republic	Vocational & Technical College Gymnasium, Jinzhong; Attendance: 300; Referees: Araújo, Perdomo (URU)
2 July 2026; 11:30	Bergling, Börjesson 6	(10–13)	Filípková 8	Vocational & Technical College Gymnasium, Jinzhong; Attendance: 300; Referees: Araújo, Perdomo (URU)
2 July 2026; 11:30	3× (suspension)	Report	5× (suspension)	Vocational & Technical College Gymnasium, Jinzhong; Attendance: 300; Referees: Araújo, Perdomo (URU)

2 July 2026; 13:45	Romania	24–25	Poland	Vocational & Technical College Gymnasium, Jinzhong; Attendance: 500; Referees: Gheisarian, Gheisarian (IRI)
2 July 2026; 13:45	Damian 9	(14–15)	Zimnicka 10	Vocational & Technical College Gymnasium, Jinzhong; Attendance: 500; Referees: Gheisarian, Gheisarian (IRI)
2 July 2026; 13:45	1× (yellow card) 6× (suspension)	Report	4× (suspension) 1× (red card)	Vocational & Technical College Gymnasium, Jinzhong; Attendance: 500; Referees: Gheisarian, Gheisarian (IRI)

==== Eleventh place game ====
3 July 2026; 11:30	Czech Republic	32–37	Romania	Vocational & Technical College Gymnasium, Jinzhong; Attendance: 200; Referees: Berdić, Šorak (SRB)
3 July 2026; 11:30	three players 5	(16–17)	Damian 15	Vocational & Technical College Gymnasium, Jinzhong; Attendance: 200; Referees: Berdić, Šorak (SRB)
3 July 2026; 11:30	5× (suspension)	Report	4× (suspension)	Vocational & Technical College Gymnasium, Jinzhong; Attendance: 200; Referees: Berdić, Šorak (SRB)

==== Ninth place game ====
3 July 2026; 13:45	Sweden	29–22	Poland	Vocational & Technical College Gymnasium, Jinzhong; Attendance: 300; Referees: Metalari, Nikolovski (MKD)
3 July 2026; 13:45	Rydén 5	(12–11)	Mazurkiewicz, Zimnicka 5	Vocational & Technical College Gymnasium, Jinzhong; Attendance: 300; Referees: Metalari, Nikolovski (MKD)
3 July 2026; 13:45	1× (suspension)	Report	1× (suspension)	Vocational & Technical College Gymnasium, Jinzhong; Attendance: 300; Referees: Metalari, Nikolovski (MKD)

== Knockout stage ==
=== Bracket ===
Championship bracket

Quarter-finals
2 July
France	33
Montenegro	23
2 July
Germany	23
Norway	22
2 July
Denmark	38
Serbia	26
2 July
Japan	33
Spain	34

Semi-finals
3 July
France	31
Germany	36
3 July
Denmark (ET)	30
Spain	29

Final
5 July
Germany	33
Denmark	26
Third place
5 July
France	24
Spain	21

5–8th place bracket

5–8th place semifinals
3 July
Montenegro	30
Norway	28
3 July
Serbia	29
Japan	27

Fifth place game
5 July
Montenegro	34
Serbia	28
Seventh place game
5 July
Norway	27
Japan	32

=== Quarterfinals ===
2 July 2026; 16:00	Denmark	38–26	Serbia	Vocational & Technical College Gymnasium, Jinzhong; Attendance: 700; Referees: Correa, Correa (BRA)
2 July 2026; 16:00	Hoppe 9	(18–9)	Milosavljević 6	Vocational & Technical College Gymnasium, Jinzhong; Attendance: 700; Referees: Correa, Correa (BRA)
2 July 2026; 16:00	2× (suspension)	Report	2× (suspension)	Vocational & Technical College Gymnasium, Jinzhong; Attendance: 700; Referees: Correa, Correa (BRA)

2 July 2026; 16:00	France	33–23	Montenegro	City Gymnasium, Jinzhong; Attendance: 2,500; Referees: Nygaard, Primdahl (DEN)
2 July 2026; 16:00	Abdou 8	(20–13)	Mitrović, Savić 6	City Gymnasium, Jinzhong; Attendance: 2,500; Referees: Nygaard, Primdahl (DEN)
2 July 2026; 16:00	1× (yellow card) 2× (suspension)	Report	7× (suspension) 1× (red card)	City Gymnasium, Jinzhong; Attendance: 2,500; Referees: Nygaard, Primdahl (DEN)

2 July 2026; 18:30	Japan	33–34	Spain	Vocational & Technical College Gymnasium, Jinzhong; Attendance: 800; Referees: Thiyagarajah, Thiyagarajah (GER)
2 July 2026; 18:30	Samo 7	(15–18)	B. Rodríguez 7	Vocational & Technical College Gymnasium, Jinzhong; Attendance: 800; Referees: Thiyagarajah, Thiyagarajah (GER)
2 July 2026; 18:30	3× (suspension)	Report	4× (suspension)	Vocational & Technical College Gymnasium, Jinzhong; Attendance: 800; Referees: Thiyagarajah, Thiyagarajah (GER)

2 July 2026; 18:30	Germany	23–22	Norway	City Gymnasium, Jinzhong; Attendance: 3,100; Referees: El-Saied, El-Saied (EGY)
2 July 2026; 18:30	Rohr 6	(10–13)	three players 4	City Gymnasium, Jinzhong; Attendance: 3,100; Referees: El-Saied, El-Saied (EGY)
2 July 2026; 18:30	1× (yellow card) 2× (suspension)	Report	1× (suspension)	City Gymnasium, Jinzhong; Attendance: 3,100; Referees: El-Saied, El-Saied (EGY)

=== 5–8th place semifinals ===
3 July 2026; 16:00	Montenegro	30–28	Norway	Vocational & Technical College Gymnasium, Jinzhong; Attendance: 600; Referees: Oyarzun, Zaragüeta (ESP)
3 July 2026; 16:00	Mitrović 9	(16–10)	Löfsted 7	Vocational & Technical College Gymnasium, Jinzhong; Attendance: 600; Referees: Oyarzun, Zaragüeta (ESP)
3 July 2026; 16:00	5× (suspension)	Report	5× (suspension)	Vocational & Technical College Gymnasium, Jinzhong; Attendance: 600; Referees: Oyarzun, Zaragüeta (ESP)

3 July 2026; 18:30	Serbia	29–27	Japan	Vocational & Technical College Gymnasium, Jinzhong; Attendance: 850; Referees: Pepe (ITA), Stancu ( ROU)
3 July 2026; 18:30	Radović 8	(15–14)	Jinno 6	Vocational & Technical College Gymnasium, Jinzhong; Attendance: 850; Referees: Pepe (ITA), Stancu ( ROU)
3 July 2026; 18:30	2× (suspension)	Report	2× (suspension)	Vocational & Technical College Gymnasium, Jinzhong; Attendance: 850; Referees: Pepe (ITA), Stancu ( ROU)

=== Semifinals ===
3 July 2026; 16:00	France	31–36	Germany	City Gymnasium, Jinzhong; Attendance: 3,600; Referees: Fremstad, Jørstad (NOR)
3 July 2026; 16:00	Koestner 6	(15–15)	Bornhardt 9	City Gymnasium, Jinzhong; Attendance: 3,600; Referees: Fremstad, Jørstad (NOR)
3 July 2026; 16:00	1× (suspension)	Report	3× (suspension)	City Gymnasium, Jinzhong; Attendance: 3,600; Referees: Fremstad, Jørstad (NOR)

3 July 2026
18:30
Denmark
30–29 (ET)
Spain
City Gymnasium, Jinzhong
Attendance: 3,800
Referees: Altmár, Horváth (HUN)
Hoppe 8
(12–13)
Julve 7
1× (yellow card) 3× (suspension) 1× (red card)
Report
1× (yellow card) 2× (suspension)

FT: 25–25 ET: 5–4

=== Seventh place game ===
5 July 2026; 11:30	Norway	27–32	Japan	City Gymnasium, Jinzhong; Attendance: 3,500; Referees: Al-Enezi, Al-Nassem (KUW)
5 July 2026; 11:30	With 5	(16–15)	Inayoshi 6	City Gymnasium, Jinzhong; Attendance: 3,500; Referees: Al-Enezi, Al-Nassem (KUW)
5 July 2026; 11:30	1× (suspension)	Report	2× (suspension)	City Gymnasium, Jinzhong; Attendance: 3,500; Referees: Al-Enezi, Al-Nassem (KUW)

=== Fifth place game ===
5 July 2026; 13:45	Montenegro	34–28	Serbia	City Gymnasium, Jinzhong; Attendance: 3,700; Referees: Araújo, Perdomo (URU)
5 July 2026; 13:45	Mitrović 8	(19–13)	Otašević 6	City Gymnasium, Jinzhong; Attendance: 3,700; Referees: Araújo, Perdomo (URU)
5 July 2026; 13:45	4× (suspension) 2× (red card)	Report	4× (suspension)	City Gymnasium, Jinzhong; Attendance: 3,700; Referees: Araújo, Perdomo (URU)

=== Third place game ===
5 July 2026; 16:00	France	24–21	Spain	City Gymnasium, Jinzhong; Attendance: 3,800; Referees: El-Saied, El-Saied (EGY)
5 July 2026; 16:00	Atangana 4	(16–11)	Lluch 7	City Gymnasium, Jinzhong; Attendance: 3,800; Referees: El-Saied, El-Saied (EGY)
5 July 2026; 16:00	3× (suspension)	Report	1× (suspension)	City Gymnasium, Jinzhong; Attendance: 3,800; Referees: El-Saied, El-Saied (EGY)

=== Final ===
5 July 2026; 18:30	Germany	33–26	Denmark	City Gymnasium, Jinzhong; Attendance: 4,200; Referees: Correa, Correa (BRA)
5 July 2026; 18:30	Rohr 8	(15–14)	three players 4	City Gymnasium, Jinzhong; Attendance: 4,200; Referees: Correa, Correa (BRA)
5 July 2026; 18:30	1× (suspension)	Report	1× (yellow card) 3× (suspension)	City Gymnasium, Jinzhong; Attendance: 4,200; Referees: Correa, Correa (BRA)

== Final ranking ==
Rank	Team
1st place, gold medalist(s)	Germany
2nd place, silver medalist(s)	Denmark
3rd place, bronze medalist(s)	France
4	Spain
5	Montenegro
6	Serbia
7	Japan
8	Norway
9	Sweden
10	Poland
11	Romania
12	Czech Republic
13	Hungary
14	China
15	Austria
16	South Korea
17	Croatia
18	Egypt
19	Iceland
20	Brazil
21	Argentina
22	Angola
23	Faroe Islands
24	Algeria
25	Turkey
26	Paraguay
27	Tunisia
28	Guinea
29	United States
30	Chinese Taipei
31	Canada
32	India

== Statistics and awards ==
=== Top goalscorers ===
Rank	Name	Goals	Shots	%
1	(Denmark) Kirstine Hoppe	66	96	69
2	(Romania) Teodora-Lavinia Damian	55	74	74
3	(United States) Maggie Doherty Dahllöf	54	96	56
4	(India) Shivani Devi	53	98	54
5	(Poland) Zuzanna Zimnicka	51	91	56
6	(Germany) Chiara Rohr	50	61	82
6	(South Korea) Suh A-young	50	87	57
8	(Faroe Islands) Silja Eystberg	46	72	64
9	(Argentina) Helena Molina	44	76	58
9	(Croatia) Mirna Brusić	44	54	81
9	(Iceland) Ásthildur Þórhallsdóttir	44	61	72

Source: IHF

=== Top goalkeepers ===
Rank	Name	%	Saves	Shots
1	(Germany) Merle-Sophie Muth	61	17	28
2	(Croatia) Marta Turkalj	56	10	18
3	(Sweden) Tyra Börjesson	48	10	21
4	(Denmark) Freja Sølling	44	15	34
5	(Egypt) Gihad Sayed	42	87	206
6	(Montenegro) Vanja Živković	41	22	54
7	(Hungary) Gréta Majoros	40	44	111
8	(France) Leane Gonzalez	39	36	92
8	(Sweden) Anna Danielsson	39	50	128
8	(Egypt) Retaj Mohamed	39	7	18

Source: IHF

=== All-Star Team ===
The all-star team was announced on 5 July 2026.

Position	Player
Goalkeeper	(Denmark) Freja Nielsen
Right wing	(France) Dawiya Abdou
Right back	(Denmark) Julie Groth
Centre back	(Denmark) Kirstine Hoppe
Left back	(Spain) Belén Rodríguez Lario
Left wing	(Germany) Chiara Rohr
Pivot	(Spain) Kelly Fonkeng
MVP	(Germany) Ruslana Litvinov

== See also ==
- 2026 IHF Women's U18 Handball World Championship
