= 1991 Women's Junior World Handball Championship =

1991 Junior World Championship
Tournament details
- Host country: France
- Dates: August 23–September 1
- Teams: 15+2 (from 4 confederations)

Final positions
- Champions: Soviet Union (7th title)
- Runners-up: South Korea
- Third place: Denmark
- Fourth place: Sweden

Tournament statistics
- Matches played: 62

The 1991 Women's Junior World Handball Championship was the eighth edition of the tournament which took place in France from 23 August to 1 September 1991. Seventeen teams competed in the competition from four continents with Brazil and Chinese Taipei making there first appearance in a tournament.

After 62 matches, the Soviet Union took home their seventh gold medal and their fifth in a row after defeating South Korea by a single goal in the gold-medal match. Denmark finished in third place overall after they defeated Sweden in the bronze medal playoff.

== Preliminary Round ==
=== Group A ===
Team	Pld	W	D	L	GF	GA	GD	Pts
South Korea	3	3	0	0	79	52	+27	6
Denmark	3	2	0	1	69	66	+3	4
Romania	3	1	0	2	63	52	+11	2
Japan	3	0	0	3	56	97	−41	0

Source: IHF

23 August 1991	South Korea	20–16	Romania	France

23 August 1991	Denmark	32–25	Japan	France

24 August 1991	South Korea	36–18	Japan	France

24 August 1991	Denmark	19–18	Romania	France

25 August 1991	South Korea	23–18	Denmark	France

25 August 1991	Romania	29–13	Japan	France

=== Group B ===
Team	Pld	W	D	L	GF	GA	GD	Pts
France (H)	3	2	0	1	79	66	+13	4
Bulgaria	3	2	0	1	81	73	+8	4
China	3	2	0	1	77	71	+6	4
Austria	3	0	0	3	63	90	−27	0

Source: IHF
(H) Hosts

23 August 1991	France	25–21	China	France

23 August 1991	Bulgaria	32–21	Austria	France

24 August 1991	China	27–21	Austria	France

24 August 1991	Bulgaria	24–23	France	France

25 August 1991	France	31–21	Austria	France

25 August 1991	China	29–25	Bulgaria	France

=== Group C ===
Team	Pld	W	D	L	GF	GA	GD	Pts
Czechoslovakia	2	2	0	0	47	39	+8	4
Yugoslavia	2	1	0	1	43	42	+1	2
Chinese Taipei	2	0	0	2	39	48	−9	0
Canada (Note: Canada is presented out of competition.)	3	2	0	1	68	53	+15	4

Source: IHF
Notes:

23 August 1991	Czechoslovakia	24–20	Canada	France

23 August 1991	Yugoslavia	23–20	Chinese Taipei	France

24 August 1991	Canada	23–19	Yugoslavia	France

24 August 1991	Czechoslovakia	25–19	Chinese Taipei	France

25 August 1991	Czechoslovakia	22–20	Yugoslavia	France

25 August 1991	Canada	25–10	Chinese Taipei	France

=== Group D ===
Team	Pld	W	D	L	GF	GA	GD	Pts
Soviet Union	3	3	0	0	75	32	+43	6
Sweden	3	2	0	1	58	50	+8	4
Germany	3	1	0	2	65	63	+2	2
Brazil	3	0	0	3	33	86	−53	0

Source: IHF

23 August 1991	Soviet Union	25–15	Germany	France

23 August 1991	Sweden	25–11	Brazil	France

24 August 1991	Soviet Union	26–6	Brazil	France

24 August 1991	Sweden	22–15	Germany	France

25 August 1991	Soviet Union	24–11	Sweden	France

25 August 1991	Germany	35–16	Brazil	France

== Main round ==
=== Group I ===
Team	Pld	W	D	L	GF	GA	GD	Pts
South Korea	5	4	1	0	135	91	+44	9
Denmark	5	4	0	1	118	96	+22	8
Romania	5	2	1	2	111	97	+14	5
Bulgaria	5	1	1	3	119	137	−18	3
China	5	1	1	3	103	133	−30	3
France	5	1	0	4	95	127	−32	2

Source: IHF

27 August 1991	South Korea	29–29	Bulgaria	France

27 August 1991	Denmark	30–18	China	France

27 August 1991	Romania	26–16	France	France

28 August 1991	South Korea	31–13	China	France

28 August 1991	Denmark	24–16	France	France

28 August 1991	Romania	29–20	Bulgaria	France

29 August 1991	Romania	22–22	China	France

29 August 1991	Denmark	27–21	Bulgaria	France

29 August 1991	South Korea	32–15	France	France

=== Group II ===
Team	Pld	W	D	L	GF	GA	GD	Pts
Soviet Union	5	5	0	0	128	84	+44	10
Sweden	5	3	0	2	100	96	+4	6
Germany	5	3	0	2	94	104	−10	6
Czechoslovakia	5	2	0	3	102	99	+3	4
Yugoslavia	5	2	0	3	107	114	−7	4
Chinese Taipei	5	0	0	5	92	126	−34	0

Source: IHF

27 August 1991	Germany	20–19	Czechoslovakia	France

27 August 1991	Yugoslavia	25–23	Sweden	France

27 August 1991	Soviet Union	24–14	Chinese Taipei	France

28 August 1991	Sweden	14–12	Czechoslovakia	France

28 August 1991	Soviet Union	29–20	Czechoslovakia	France

28 August 1991	Germany	24–19	Sweden	France

29 August 1991	Sweden	30–20	Chinese Taipei	France

29 August 1991	Germany	20–19	Yugoslavia	France

29 August 1991	Soviet Union	26–24	Czechoslovakia	France

=== Classification Round ===
Team	Pld	W	D	L	GF	GA	GD	Pts
Japan	2	1	1	0	54	42	+12	3
Austria	3	2	1	0	40	33	+7	5
Brazil	2	0	0	2	35	54	−19	0
Canada (Note: Canada is presented out of competition.)	3	3	0	0	76	47	+29	6
Nigeria (Note: Nigeria is presented out of competition.)	3	1	0	2	65	68	−3	2

Source: IHF
Notes:

August 1991	Canada	25–19	Nigeria	France

August 1991	Japan	34–22	Brazil	France

August 1991	Austria	24–21	Nigeria	France

August 1991	Nigeria	26–19	Japan	France

August 1991	Canada	22–19	Austria	France

August 1991	Austria	20–13	Brazil	France

August 1991	Canada	29–10	Brazil	France

August 1991	Japan	20–20	Austria	France

== Placement matches ==
=== Eleventh-place game ===
1 September 1991	Chinese Taipei	25–21	France	France

=== Ninth-place game ===
1 September 1991	Yugoslavia	25–22	China	France

=== Seventh-place game ===
1 September 1991	Czechoslovakia	23–21	Bulgaria	France

=== Fifth-place game ===
1 September 1991	Romania	21–16	Germany	France

=== Third-place game ===
1 September 1991	Denmark	25–18	Sweden	France

=== Final ===
1 September 1991	Soviet Union	26–25	South Korea	France

== Ranking ==
The final rankings from the 1991 edition:

Rank	Team
Gold medal	Soviet Union
Silver medal	South Korea
Bronze medal	Denmark
4	Sweden
5	Romania
6	Germany
7	Czechoslovakia
8	Bulgaria
9	Yugoslavia
10	China
11	Chinese Taipei
12	France
13	Japan
14	Austria
15	Brazil

Both Canada and Nigeria were presented out of competition.
