= 1993 Women's Junior World Handball Championship =

1993 Junior World Championship
Tournament details
- Host country: Bulgaria
- Dates: September 3–12
- Teams: 16 (from 4 confederations)

Final positions
- Champions: Russia (1st title)
- Runner-up: Bulgaria
- Third place: South Korea
- Fourth place: Denmark

Tournament statistics
- Matches played: 54

The 1993 Women's Junior World Handball Championship was the ninth edition of the tournament which took place in Gabrovo and Veliko Tarnovo, Bulgaria from 3 to 12 September 1993. Sixteen teams competed in the competition from four continents with Belarus, North Korea, Russia and Ukraine making there first appearance in a tournament.

After 54 matches, Russia took home their first gold medal defeating Bulgaria by seven goals in the gold medal match. South Korea finished in third place overall after they defeated Denmark in the bronze medal playoff.

== Second Round ==
=== Group I ===
Team	Pld	W	D	L	GF	GA	GD	Pts
Russia	5	4	0	1	121	105	+16	8
South Korea	5	3	1	1	138	112	+26	7
Romania	5	2	2	1	126	100	+26	6
Ukraine	5	2	1	2	120	114	+6	5
Germany	5	1	0	4	103	128	−25	2
Japan	5	1	0	4	114	163	−49	2

September 1993	Russia	22–18	Germany	Bulgaria
September 1993		(11–6)		Bulgaria

September 1993	Romania	19–19	Ukraine	Bulgaria
September 1993		(9–8)		Bulgaria

September 1993	South Korea	36–21	Japan	Bulgaria
September 1993		(20–9)		Bulgaria

September 1993	Russia	21–18	Ukraine	Bulgaria
September 1993		(10–9)		Bulgaria

September 1993	South Korea	23–23	Romania	Bulgaria
September 1993		(12–12)		Bulgaria

September 1993	Japan	26–25	Germany	Bulgaria
September 1993		(15–14)		Bulgaria

September 1993	Ukraine	32–22	Japan	Bulgaria
September 1993		(15–9)		Bulgaria

September 1993	Romania	28–14	Germany	Bulgaria
September 1993		(12–6)		Bulgaria

September 1993	South Korea	25–21	Russia	Bulgaria
September 1993		(11–10)		Bulgaria

=== Group II ===
Team	Pld	W	D	L	GF	GA	GD	Pts
Bulgaria	5	5	0	0	135	108	+27	10
Denmark	5	3	0	2	120	107	+13	6
Belarus	5	2	0	3	120	114	+6	4
Poland	5	2	0	3	102	115	−13	4
Sweden	5	2	0	3	98	121	−23	4
Austria	5	1	0	4	114	124	−10	2

September 1993	Bulgaria	33–28	Austria	Bulgaria
September 1993		(17–13)		Bulgaria

September 1993	Poland	26–20	Belarus	Bulgaria
September 1993		(11–10)		Bulgaria

September 1993	Denmark	22–17	Sweden	Bulgaria
September 1993		(12–6)		Bulgaria

September 1993	Bulgaria	25–16	Poland	Bulgaria
September 1993		(15–8)		Bulgaria

September 1993	Belarus	29–23	Denmark	Bulgaria
September 1993		(17–10)		Bulgaria

September 1993	Sweden	21–20	Austria	Bulgaria
September 1993		(13–11)		Bulgaria

September 1993	Sweden	23–22	Poland	Bulgaria
September 1993		(12–11)		Bulgaria

September 1993	Austria	22–19	Belarus	Bulgaria
September 1993		(11–10)		Bulgaria

September 1993	Bulgaria	24–22	Denmark	Bulgaria
September 1993		(13–10)		Bulgaria

=== Thirteenth place ===
Team	Pld	W	D	L	GF	GA	GD	Pts
Brazil	3	3	0	0	70	58	+12	6
North Korea	3	2	0	1	68	70	−2	4
China	3	1	0	2	76	66	+10	2
Algeria	3	0	0	3	51	71	−20	0

September 1993	China	32–19	Algeria	Bulgaria
September 1993		(17–8)		Bulgaria

September 1993	Brazil	30–22	North Korea	Bulgaria
September 1993		(17–11)		Bulgaria

September 1993	Brazil	20–19	China	Bulgaria
September 1993		(13–9)		Bulgaria

September 1993	North Korea	19–15	Algeria	Bulgaria
September 1993		(9–8)		Bulgaria

September 1993	North Korea	27–25	China	Bulgaria
September 1993		(15–14)		Bulgaria

September 1993	Brazil	20–17	Algeria	Bulgaria
September 1993		(12–4)		Bulgaria

== Placement matches ==
=== Eleventh-place game ===
September 1993	Austria	34–33	Japan	Bulgaria
September 1993		(13–17)		Bulgaria

=== Ninth-place game ===
September 1993	Sweden	26–24	Germany	Bulgaria
September 1993		(10–11)		Bulgaria

=== Seventh-place game ===
September 1993	Ukraine	32–14	Poland	Bulgaria
September 1993		(15–6)		Bulgaria

=== Fifth-place game ===
September 1993	Romania	33–29	Belarus	Bulgaria
September 1993		(18–12)		Bulgaria

=== Third-place game ===
September 1993	South Korea	28–27	Denmark	Bulgaria
September 1993		(13–12)		Bulgaria

=== Final ===
September 1993	Russia	24–17	Bulgaria	Bulgaria
September 1993		(12–6)		Bulgaria

== Ranking ==
The final rankings from the 1993 edition:

Rank	Team
Gold medal	Russia
Silver medal	Bulgaria
Bronze medal	South Korea
4	Denmark
5	Romania
6	Belarus
7	Ukraine
8	Poland
9	Sweden
10	Germany
11	Austria
12	Japan
13	Brazil
14	North Korea
15	China
16	Algeria
