= Chinese Taipei women's national junior handball team =

Chinese Taipei

Information
- Association: Chinese Taipei Handball Association
- Coach: Tan Tsung-sheng

Colours
1st	2nd

Results

IHF U-20 World Championship
- Appearances: 6 (First in 1991)
- Best result: 11th (1991)
- Last updated on Unknown.

The Chinese Taipei women's junior national handball team is the national under-19 handball team of Chinese Taipei. Controlled by the Chinese Taipei Handball Association it represents the country in international matches.

== World Championship record ==
- 1991 – 11th place
- 1999 – 16th place
- 2001 – 19th place
- 2008 – 17th place
- 2024 – 26th place
- 2026 – 30th place
