= China women's national junior handball team =

China

Information
- Association: Chinese Handball Association
- Coach: Sándor Zsadányi

Colours
1st	2nd

Results

IHF U-20 World Championship
- Appearances: 20 (First in 1981)
- Best result: 6th (1981, 1985, 1989)
- Last updated on Unknown.

The China women's junior national handball team is the national under-19 handball team of China. Controlled by the Chinese Handball Association it represents the country in international matches.

== World Championship record ==
- 1981 – 6th place
- 1983 – 13th place
- 1985 – 6th place
- 1987 – 7th place
- 1989 – 6th place
- 1991 – 10th place
- 1993 – 5th place
- 1995 – 17th place
- 1997 – 14th place
- 1999 – 10th place
- 2001 – 17th place
- 2003 – 16th place
- 2005 – 13th place
- 2010 – 17th place
- 2012 – 22nd place
- 2014 – 19th place
- 2016 – 18th place
- 2018 – 21st place
- 2024 – 15th place
- 2026 – 14th place
