= India women's national junior handball team =

India

Information
- Association: Handball Federation of India
- Coach: Sachin Choudhary

Colours
1st	2nd

Results

IHF U-20 World Championship
- Appearances: 2 (First in 2022)
- Best result: 26th (2022)
- Last updated on Unknown.

The India women's junior national handball team is the national under-19 handball team of India. Controlled by the Handball Federation of India it represents the country in international matches.

== World Championship record ==
- 2022 – 26th place
- 2026 – 32nd place
