= Japan women's national junior handball team =

Japanese handball team

Japan

Information
- Association: Japan Handball Association
- Coach: Shota Arai

Colours
1st	2nd

Results

IHF U-20 World Championship
- Appearances: 22 (First in 1979)
- Best result: 7th place (2026)
- Last updated on Unknown.

The Japan women's junior national handball team is the national under-19 handball team of Japan. It is controlled by the Japan Handball Association and is an affiliate of the International Handball Federation as well as a member of the Asian Handball Federation. The team represents Japan in international matches.

== World Championship record ==
Champions Runners up Third place Fourth place

Year	Round	Position	GP	W	D	L	GS	GA	GD
1977 (Romania)	Didn't qualify								
1979 (Socialist Federal Republic of Yugoslavia)		10th place							
1981 (Canada)	Didn't qualify								
1983 (France)		15th place							
1985 (South Korea)		12th place							
1987 (Denmark)		15th place							
1989 (Nigeria)		10th place							
1991 (France)		13th place							
1993 (Bulgaria)		12th place							
1995 (Brazil)		12th place							
1997 (Ivory Coast)	quarter-finals	8th place							
1999 (China)		19th place							
2001 (Hungary)		20th place							
2003 (North Macedonia)		17th place							
2005 (Czech Republic)		10th place							
2008 (North Macedonia)		14th place							
2010 (South Korea)		16th place							
2012 (Czech Republic)		21st place							
2014 (Croatia)		17th place							
2016 (Russia)		15th place							
2018 (Hungary)		14th place							
2022 (Slovenia)		9th place							
2024 (North Macedonia)		20th place							
2026 (China)		7th place							
Total	22/24	0 Titles							
