= Handball at the 2024 Summer Olympics – Asian women's qualification tournament =

Asian Women's Qualification for Olympic Games 2024
- Logo of the tournament

Tournament details
- Host country: Japan
- Venue(s): 1 (in 1 host city)
- Dates: 17–23 August 2023
- Teams: 5 (from 1 confederation)

Final positions
- Champions: South Korea
- Runner-up: Japan
- Third place: China
- Fourth place: Kazakhstan

Tournament statistics
- Matches played: 10
- Goals scored: 613 (61.3 per match)
- Top scorer(s): (India) Bhawana (26 goals)

Awards
- Best player: (South Korea) Kang Kyung-min

The Asian Women's Qualification for Olympic Games 2024 was held in Hiroshima, Japan. South Korea, as the winner of the tournament, qualified for the 2024 Summer Olympics.

== Standings ==
Uzbekistan withdrew before the tournament.

Pos	Team	Pld	W	D	L	GF	GA	GD	Pts	Qualification
1	South Korea	4	4	0	0	156	82	+74	8	2024 Summer Olympics
2	Japan (H)	4	3	0	1	163	88	+75	6	Qualification tournaments
3	China	4	2	0	2	101	118	−17	4	
4	Kazakhstan	4	1	0	3	112	154	−42	2	
5	India	4	0	0	4	81	171	−90	0	

Source: AHF
Rules for classification: 1) points; 2) head-to-head points; 3) head-to-head goal difference; 4) head-to-head number of goals scored; 5) goal difference.
(H) Hosts

== Matches ==
All times are local (UTC+9).

17 August 2023; 14:00	China	33–26	Kazakhstan	Higashi-ku Sports Center, Hiroshima; Referees: Gheisarian, Gheisarian (IRI)
17 August 2023; 14:00	Lin 6	(16–13)	Zhaparova 6	Higashi-ku Sports Center, Hiroshima; Referees: Gheisarian, Gheisarian (IRI)
17 August 2023; 14:00	1× (yellow card) 3× (suspension)	Report	1× (suspension) 1× (red card)	Higashi-ku Sports Center, Hiroshima; Referees: Gheisarian, Gheisarian (IRI)

17 August 2023; 17:00	South Korea	53–14	India	Higashi-ku Sports Center, Hiroshima; Referees: Hideki, Tetsuro (JPN)
17 August 2023; 17:00	Shin E. 9	(28–7)	Bhawana, Menika 4	Higashi-ku Sports Center, Hiroshima; Referees: Hideki, Tetsuro (JPN)
17 August 2023; 17:00	1× (suspension)	Report	1× (yellow card) 5× (suspension) 1× (red card)	Higashi-ku Sports Center, Hiroshima; Referees: Hideki, Tetsuro (JPN)

18 August 2023; 14:00	India	17–54	Japan	Higashi-ku Sports Center, Hiroshima; Referees: Ismoilov, Ismoilov (UZB)
18 August 2023; 14:00	Menika 7	(10–30)	Ozaki 7	Higashi-ku Sports Center, Hiroshima; Referees: Ismoilov, Ismoilov (UZB)
18 August 2023; 14:00	1× (yellow card) 4× (suspension)	Report	1× (suspension)	Higashi-ku Sports Center, Hiroshima; Referees: Ismoilov, Ismoilov (UZB)

18 August 2023; 17:00	South Korea	33–20	China	Higashi-ku Sports Center, Hiroshima; Referees: Al-Naseem, Al-Enezi (KUW)
18 August 2023; 17:00	Lee 6	(16–9)	Jin, Zhou 4	Higashi-ku Sports Center, Hiroshima; Referees: Al-Naseem, Al-Enezi (KUW)
18 August 2023; 17:00	2× (suspension)	Report	3× (suspension)	Higashi-ku Sports Center, Hiroshima; Referees: Al-Naseem, Al-Enezi (KUW)

20 August 2023; 14:00	Japan	50–28	Kazakhstan	Higashi-ku Sports Center, Hiroshima; Referees: Lee, Lee (KOR)
20 August 2023; 14:00	Okada 7	(24–14)	Khardina 7	Higashi-ku Sports Center, Hiroshima; Referees: Lee, Lee (KOR)
20 August 2023; 14:00	5× (suspension)	Report	1× (suspension)	Higashi-ku Sports Center, Hiroshima; Referees: Lee, Lee (KOR)

20 August 2023; 17:00	China	30–24	India	Higashi-ku Sports Center, Hiroshima; Referees: Furukawa, Murata (JPN)
20 August 2023; 17:00	Jin 7	(12–10)	Menika 10	Higashi-ku Sports Center, Hiroshima; Referees: Furukawa, Murata (JPN)
20 August 2023; 17:00	1× (suspension)	Report	2× (suspension)	Higashi-ku Sports Center, Hiroshima; Referees: Furukawa, Murata (JPN)

21 August 2023; 14:00	China	18–35	Japan	Higashi-ku Sports Center, Hiroshima; Attendance: 601; Referees: Gheisarian, Gheisarian (IRI)
21 August 2023; 14:00	Jin, Zhou 5	(9–17)	Aizawa 6	Higashi-ku Sports Center, Hiroshima; Attendance: 601; Referees: Gheisarian, Gheisarian (IRI)
21 August 2023; 14:00	1× (yellow card) 7× (suspension) 1× (red card)	Report	2× (suspension)	Higashi-ku Sports Center, Hiroshima; Attendance: 601; Referees: Gheisarian, Gheisarian (IRI)

21 August 2023; 17:00	Kazakhstan	24–45	South Korea	Higashi-ku Sports Center, Hiroshima; Referees: Al-Naseem, Al-Enezi (KUW)
21 August 2023; 17:00	Khardina 8	(12–19)	Ryu 8	Higashi-ku Sports Center, Hiroshima; Referees: Al-Naseem, Al-Enezi (KUW)
21 August 2023; 17:00	3× (suspension) 1× (red card)	Report	3× (suspension)	Higashi-ku Sports Center, Hiroshima; Referees: Al-Naseem, Al-Enezi (KUW)

23 August 2023; 12:00	Kazakhstan	34–26	India	Higashi-ku Sports Center, Hiroshima; Referees: Lee, Lee (KOR)
23 August 2023; 12:00	Radayeva, Seitkassym 6	(18–14)	Bhawana 13	Higashi-ku Sports Center, Hiroshima; Referees: Lee, Lee (KOR)
23 August 2023; 12:00	2× (suspension)	Report	2× (suspension)	Higashi-ku Sports Center, Hiroshima; Referees: Lee, Lee (KOR)

23 August 2023; 15:00	Japan	24–25	South Korea	Higashi-ku Sports Center, Hiroshima; Referees: Ismoilov, Ismoilov (UZB)
23 August 2023; 15:00	Aizawa 9	(15–14)	Gim 6	Higashi-ku Sports Center, Hiroshima; Referees: Ismoilov, Ismoilov (UZB)
23 August 2023; 15:00	2× (suspension)	Report	3× (suspension)	Higashi-ku Sports Center, Hiroshima; Referees: Ismoilov, Ismoilov (UZB)

== All-Star team ==
Position	Player
Goalkeeper	(China) Lu Chang
Right wing	(Japan) Saki Hattori
Right back	(Japan) Kaho Nakayama
Centre back	(Japan) Natsuki Aizawa
Left back	(South Korea) Lee Mi-gyeong
Left wing	(South Korea) Shin Eun-joo
Pivot	(Japan) Mika Nagata
Most valuable player	(South Korea) Kang Kyung-min
