= Handball at the 2022 Asian Games =

- Venue: ZJSU Sports Centre; ZJNU Xiaoshan Gymnasium
- Date: 24 September – 5 October 2023
- Competitors: 344 from 15 nations

Handball at the 2022 Asian Games was held at the Zhejiang Gongshang University Sports Centre and Zhejiang Normal University Xiaoshan Gymnasium, Hangzhou, China, from 24 September to 5 October 2023. In this tournament, 13 teams participated in the men's competition while nine teams participated in the women's competition.

== Schedule ==
P	Preliminary round	S	Second round	½	Semifinals	F	Finals

Event↓/Date →	24th Sun	25th Mon	26th Tue	27th Wed	28th Thu	29th Fri	30th Sat	1st Sun	2nd Mon	3rd Tue	4th Wed	5th Thu
Men	P	P		P		S	S	S		½		F
Women	P	P		P		P	P			½		F

== Medalists ==
Event	Gold	Silver	Bronze
Men	Qatar; Ahmad Madadi; Rafael Capote; Frankis Carol; Abdulrazzaq Murad; Bilal Lepenica; Eldar Memišević; Irhad Alihodžić; Amir Denguir; Abdelrahman Abdalla; Allaedine Berrached; Wajdi Sinen; Yassine Sami; Youssef Benali; Amine Guehis; Moustafa Heiba; Ameen Zakkar	Bahrain; Ali Abdulla Eid; Hasan Al-Samahiji; Mohamed Hameed Rabia; Hesham Ahmed; Qasim Qambar; Mohamed Abdulredha; Ahmed Jalal; Mohamed Merza; Mohamed Abdulhusain; Hasan Madan; Ali Merza; Hasan Merza; Mahdi Saad; Mohamed Habib; Mohamed Habib Naser; Husain Al-Sayyad	Kuwait; Abdullah Al-Khamees; Saleh Al-Musawi; Abdulaziz Al-Shammari; Fahad Slbokh; Mohammad Al-Sanea; Mohammad Al-Hendal; Mishaal Al-Harbi; Hasan Safar; Abdulaziz Naseeb; Fawaz Mubarak; Mohammad Qambar; Abdulaziz Salmeen; Abdulrahman Al-Shammari; Haider Dashti; Yousef Zayef; Mohammad Buyabes
Women	Japan; Naoko Sahara; Miyako Hatsumi; Yumi Kitahara; Saki Hattori; Chikako Kasai; Atsuko Baba; Kaho Nakayama; Ayaka Omatsuzawa; Hikaru Matsumoto; Naho Saito; Natsuki Aizawa; Ayame Okada; Reina Dan; Kana Ozaki; Yuki Yoshidome; Sora Ishikawa	South Korea; Kim Seon-hwa; Song Ji-young; Shin Eun-joo; Kim Min-seo; Ryu Eun-hee; Jeong Jin-hui; Park Sae-young; Jo Su-yeon; Kang Eun-hye; Song Hye-soo; Lee Mi-gyeong; Kang Kyung-min; Kang Eun-seo; Yun Ye-jin; Gim Bo-eun; Park Jo-eun	China; Lu Chang; Zhang Haixia; Lin Yanqun; Tian Xiuxiu; Liu Chan; Li Xiaoqing; Zhou Mengxue; Hu Yunuo; Zhang Guisi; Yang Yurou; Zhuang Hongyan; Xin Yan; Gong Lei; Liu Xuedan; Jin Mengqing; Liu Yuting

== Medal table ==
Rank	Nation	Gold	Silver	Bronze	Total
1	Japan (JPN)	1	0	0	1
1	Qatar (QAT)	1	0	0	1
3	Bahrain (BRN)	0	1	0	1
3	South Korea (KOR)	0	1	0	1
5	China (CHN)	0	0	1	1
5	Kuwait (KUW)	0	0	1	1
Totals (6 entries)		2	2	2	6

== Draw ==
The draw for the competition was done at 27 July 2023. The draw was conducted by Hangzhou Asian Games Organizing Committee (HAGOC) in the presence of an Asian Handball Federation events officer.

=== Men ===
The teams were seeded based on their final ranking at the 2022 Asian Men's Handball Championship.

Group A

- China (Host)
- Kuwait (7)
- Thailand

Group B

- Qatar (1)
- South Korea (5)
- Hong Kong (11)

Group C

- Bahrain (2)
- Uzbekistan (8)
- Kazakhstan

Group D

- Saudi Arabia (3)
- Iran (4)
- Mongolia
- Japan

=== Women ===
The teams were seeded based on their final ranking at the 2022 Asian Women's Handball Championship.

Group A

- South Korea (1)
- Kazakhstan (5)
- Thailand (7)
- Uzbekistan (8)

Group B

- China (Host)
- Japan (2)
- India (6)
- Hong Kong (9)
- Nepal

== Final standing ==
=== Men ===
Rank	Team	Pld	W	D	L
1st place, gold medalist(s)	Qatar	7	7	0	0
2nd place, silver medalist(s)	Bahrain	7	6	0	1
3rd place, bronze medalist(s)	Kuwait	7	5	0	2
4	Japan	8	5	0	3
5	China	5	2	0	3
5	South Korea	5	2	0	3
7	Iran	6	1	1	4
7	Kazakhstan	5	1	0	4
9	Hong Kong	2	0	0	2
9	Saudi Arabia	3	1	1	1
9	Thailand	2	0	0	2
9	Uzbekistan	2	0	0	2
13	Mongolia	3	0	0	3

=== Women ===
Rank	Team	Pld	W	D	L
1st place, gold medalist(s)	Japan	6	6	0	0
2nd place, silver medalist(s)	South Korea	5	4	0	1
3rd place, bronze medalist(s)	China	6	4	0	2
4	Kazakhstan	5	2	0	3
5	India	4	1	1	2
5	Uzbekistan	3	1	0	2
7	Hong Kong	4	1	1	2
7	Thailand	3	0	0	3
9	Nepal	4	0	0	4
