= Handball at the 2022 Asian Games – Women's tournament =

Women at the 2022 Asian Games
- Venues: ZJNU Xiaoshan Gymnasium; ZJSU Sports Centre
- Dates: 24 September – 5 October 2023
- Competitors: 143 from 9 nations

Medalists
gold medal	Japan
silver medal	South Korea
bronze medal	China

The women's tournament of Handball at the 2022 Asian Games at Hangzhou, China was held between 24 September to 5 October 2023.

== Squads ==
China	Hong Kong	India	Japan
Lu Chang; Zhang Haixia; Lin Yanqun; Tian Xiuxiu; Liu Chan; Li Xiaoqing; Zhou Mengxue; Hu Yunuo; Zhang Guisi; Yang Yurou; Zhuang Hongyan; Xin Yan; Gong Lei; Liu Xuedan; Jin Mengqing; Liu Yuting	Chan Kam Ling; Ip Wai Ming; Tang Man Ting; Chong Sze Ki; Cheung Man Shan; Hung Cheuk Kiu; Wong Chi Ching; To Ka Man; Fung Sze Ming; Wu Lei Ling; Wong Wing Tung; Lee Man Nga; Lo Kei Laam; Wong Yee Ting; Cheung Mei Ngo; Yiu Hei Yan	Nina Shil; Nidhi Sharma; Bhawana Sharma; Menika Thakur; Priyanka Thakur; Priyanka Kaliraman; Mitali Sharma; Sonika Mor; Jyoti Shukla; Shalini Thakur; Pooja Kanwar; Diksha Kumari; Tejaswini Singh; Sushma Ghanghas; Asha Rani; Shiva Singh	Naoko Sahara; Miyako Hatsumi; Yumi Kitahara; Saki Hattori; Chikako Kasai; Atsuko Baba; Kaho Nakayama; Ayaka Omatsuzawa; Hikaru Matsumoto; Naho Saito; Natsuki Aizawa; Ayame Okada; Reina Dan; Kana Ozaki; Yuki Yoshidome; Sora Ishikawa
Kazakhstan	Nepal	South Korea	Thailand
Mariya Sitnikova; Sevara Rejemetova; Aida Zhaparova; Valentina Sitnikova; Veronika Khardina; Kristina Radayeva; Zlata Zvyagina; Zhannat Aitenova; Zhanerke Seitkassym; Xeniya Pupchenkova; Zhanerke Kuandykova; Damira Zhaparova; Madina Myrzamseiitova; Kristina Stepanova; Tansholpan Jumadilova; Mariya Pupchenkova	Ram Kumari Chaudhary; Ramila Basnet; Mamata Rana; Aditi Chaudhary; Devi Shrestha; Aita Lomu Sherpa; Bandana Rai; Kalpana Oli; Bimala Tamang; Uma Rai; Samjhana Kumal; Sanju Rai; Hilina Rana; Kalpana Sinjali; Bimala Bhujel; Sangita Chaudhary	Kim Seon-hwa; Song Ji-young; Shin Eun-joo; Kim Min-seo; Ryu Eun-hee; Jeong Jin-hui; Park Sae-young; Jo Su-yeon; Kang Eun-hye; Song Hye-soo; Lee Mi-gyeong; Kang Kyung-min; Kang Eun-seo; Yun Ye-jin; Gim Bo-eun; Park Jo-eun	Patcharamai Laophila; Natthawan Khropbuaban; Natthida Rattanapirom; Jirarat Maiman; Sakonsupa Kahan; Rotsukhon Bunrueang; Thanawadee Buaban; Pornsawan Klangsuwan; Preechaya Junmanee; Wantanee Wichaisang; Waruephat Supakorn; Pimpatcha Seethong; Sainam Champathong; Wanna Butchan; Phetcharat Kaiwisettham
Uzbekistan			
Lutfie Useinova; Madina Khudoykulova; Sarbinaz Saparbaeva; Dilbarhon Bahromova; Zukhra Botirova; Lobar Shamieva; Nargiza Yusupova; Anastasiya Mustafaeva; Shakhlo Abyllaeva; Dilnoza Sultanova; Darya Valeeva; Turoyim Mamirova; Charos Obidjonova; Khusniya Safarova; Sevinch Erkabaeva; Maftunakhon Vosiljonova			

== Results ==
All times are China Standard Time (UTC+08:00)

=== Preliminary round ===
==== Group A ====
Pos	Team	Pld	W	D	L	GF	GA	GD	Pts	Qualification
1	South Korea	3	3	0	0	132	53	+79	6	Semifinals
2	Kazakhstan	3	2	0	1	104	98	+6	4	Semifinals
3	Uzbekistan	3	1	0	2	89	107	−18	2	
4	Thailand	3	0	0	3	62	129	−67	0	

Source: AHF

24 September; 16:00	Thailand	20–44	Kazakhstan	ZJNU Xiaoshan Gymnasium, Hangzhou; Referees: Al-Enezi, Al-Naseem (KUW)
24 September; 16:00	Junmanee 8	(9–22)	Kuandykova 5	ZJNU Xiaoshan Gymnasium, Hangzhou; Referees: Al-Enezi, Al-Naseem (KUW)
24 September; 16:00	4× (suspension)		4× (suspension)	ZJNU Xiaoshan Gymnasium, Hangzhou; Referees: Al-Enezi, Al-Naseem (KUW)

25 September; 16:00	Uzbekistan	16–42	South Korea	ZJNU Xiaoshan Gymnasium, Hangzhou; Referees: Liu, Xu (CHN)
25 September; 16:00	Erkabaeva 5	(6–18)	Yun 6	ZJNU Xiaoshan Gymnasium, Hangzhou; Referees: Liu, Xu (CHN)
25 September; 16:00	4× (suspension)		2× (suspension)	ZJNU Xiaoshan Gymnasium, Hangzhou; Referees: Liu, Xu (CHN)

27 September; 15:00	Uzbekistan	33–37	Kazakhstan	ZJNU Xiaoshan Gymnasium, Hangzhou; Referees: Al-Marhoon, Al-Mawt (BHR)
27 September; 15:00	Saparbaeva 10	(12–15)	Rejemetova 9	ZJNU Xiaoshan Gymnasium, Hangzhou; Referees: Al-Marhoon, Al-Mawt (BHR)
27 September; 15:00	1× (yellow card) 4× (suspension)		1× (yellow card) 5× (suspension)	ZJNU Xiaoshan Gymnasium, Hangzhou; Referees: Al-Marhoon, Al-Mawt (BHR)

27 September; 17:00	Thailand	14–45	South Korea	ZJNU Xiaoshan Gymnasium, Hangzhou; Referees: Liu, Xu (CHN)
27 September; 17:00	Wichaisang 5	(9–21)	Shin 10	ZJNU Xiaoshan Gymnasium, Hangzhou; Referees: Liu, Xu (CHN)
27 September; 17:00	2× (suspension)		1× (yellow card) 3× (suspension)	ZJNU Xiaoshan Gymnasium, Hangzhou; Referees: Liu, Xu (CHN)

29 September; 16:00	Thailand	28–40	Uzbekistan	ZJNU Xiaoshan Gymnasium, Hangzhou; Referees: Liu, Xu (CHN)
29 September; 16:00	Wichaisang 14	(11–19)	Khudoykulova 6	ZJNU Xiaoshan Gymnasium, Hangzhou; Referees: Liu, Xu (CHN)
29 September; 16:00	1× (suspension)		4× (suspension)	ZJNU Xiaoshan Gymnasium, Hangzhou; Referees: Liu, Xu (CHN)

30 September; 16:00	South Korea	45–23	Kazakhstan	ZJNU Xiaoshan Gymnasium, Hangzhou; Referees: Al-Wahibi, Al-Shahi (OMA)
30 September; 16:00	Kang K. 7	(22–16)	Zhaparova 5	ZJNU Xiaoshan Gymnasium, Hangzhou; Referees: Al-Wahibi, Al-Shahi (OMA)
30 September; 16:00	2× (suspension)		2× (suspension)	ZJNU Xiaoshan Gymnasium, Hangzhou; Referees: Al-Wahibi, Al-Shahi (OMA)

==== Group B ====
Pos	Team	Pld	W	D	L	GF	GA	GD	Pts	Qualification
1	Japan	4	4	0	0	167	58	+109	8	Semifinals
2	China	4	3	0	1	154	81	+73	6	Semifinals
3	India	4	1	1	2	113	123	−10	3 (Note: Head-to-head result: IND 26–26 HKG. Overall goal difference was used as the tiebreaker.)	
4	Hong Kong	4	1	1	2	78	117	−39	3	
5	Nepal	4	0	0	4	57	190	−133	0	

Source: AHF
Notes:

24 September; 14:00	Hong Kong	10–38	Japan	ZJNU Xiaoshan Gymnasium, Hangzhou; Referees: Lee, Lee (KOR)
24 September; 14:00	Lee 3	(5–18)	Hattori 8	ZJNU Xiaoshan Gymnasium, Hangzhou; Referees: Lee, Lee (KOR)
24 September; 14:00	2× (suspension)		4× (suspension)	ZJNU Xiaoshan Gymnasium, Hangzhou; Referees: Lee, Lee (KOR)

24 September; 18:00	Nepal	10–57	China	ZJNU Xiaoshan Gymnasium, Hangzhou; Referees: Ghofli, Hassanzadeh (IRI)
24 September; 18:00	Tamang 4	(5–29)	Tian 11	ZJNU Xiaoshan Gymnasium, Hangzhou; Referees: Ghofli, Hassanzadeh (IRI)
24 September; 18:00	2× (suspension) 1× (red card)		2× (suspension)	ZJNU Xiaoshan Gymnasium, Hangzhou; Referees: Ghofli, Hassanzadeh (IRI)

25 September; 14:00	India	13–41	Japan	ZJNU Xiaoshan Gymnasium, Hangzhou; Referees: Ismoilov, Ismoilov (UZB)
25 September; 14:00	M. Thakur 4	(4–21)	Ishikawa 7	ZJNU Xiaoshan Gymnasium, Hangzhou; Referees: Ismoilov, Ismoilov (UZB)
25 September; 14:00	3× (suspension)		1× (suspension)	ZJNU Xiaoshan Gymnasium, Hangzhou; Referees: Ismoilov, Ismoilov (UZB)

25 September; 18:00	Hong Kong	15–35	China	ZJNU Xiaoshan Gymnasium, Hangzhou; Referees: Tavakkoli, Valadkhanian (IRI)
25 September; 18:00	Cheung M.N. 5	(11–17)	Liu C. 6	ZJNU Xiaoshan Gymnasium, Hangzhou; Referees: Tavakkoli, Valadkhanian (IRI)
25 September; 18:00	1× (red card)		3× (suspension)	ZJNU Xiaoshan Gymnasium, Hangzhou; Referees: Tavakkoli, Valadkhanian (IRI)

27 September; 13:00	Japan	62–10	Nepal	ZJNU Xiaoshan Gymnasium, Hangzhou; Referees: Al-Wahibi, Al-Shahi (OMA)
27 September; 13:00	Hattori 12	(37–6)	Sherpa 4	ZJNU Xiaoshan Gymnasium, Hangzhou; Referees: Al-Wahibi, Al-Shahi (OMA)
27 September; 13:00	1× (suspension)		2× (suspension)	ZJNU Xiaoshan Gymnasium, Hangzhou; Referees: Al-Wahibi, Al-Shahi (OMA)

27 September; 19:00	India	26–26	Hong Kong	ZJNU Xiaoshan Gymnasium, Hangzhou; Referees: Shakir, Kadhim (IRQ)
27 September; 19:00	M. Thakur 8	(10–12)	Cheung M.N. 7	ZJNU Xiaoshan Gymnasium, Hangzhou; Referees: Shakir, Kadhim (IRQ)
27 September; 19:00	5× (suspension)		2× (suspension)	ZJNU Xiaoshan Gymnasium, Hangzhou; Referees: Shakir, Kadhim (IRQ)

29 September; 14:00	Nepal	18–27	Hong Kong	ZJNU Xiaoshan Gymnasium, Hangzhou; Referees: Faraj, Taqi (KUW)
29 September; 14:00	Sinjali 7	(6–14)	To 5	ZJNU Xiaoshan Gymnasium, Hangzhou; Referees: Faraj, Taqi (KUW)
29 September; 14:00	5× (suspension) 1× (red card)		4× (suspension)	ZJNU Xiaoshan Gymnasium, Hangzhou; Referees: Faraj, Taqi (KUW)

29 September; 18:00	India	30–37	China	ZJNU Xiaoshan Gymnasium, Hangzhou; Referees: Tavakkoli, Valadkhanian (IRI)
29 September; 18:00	B. Sharma, M. Thakur 8	(12–18)	Tian 6	ZJNU Xiaoshan Gymnasium, Hangzhou; Referees: Tavakkoli, Valadkhanian (IRI)
29 September; 18:00	4× (suspension)		1× (suspension)	ZJNU Xiaoshan Gymnasium, Hangzhou; Referees: Tavakkoli, Valadkhanian (IRI)

30 September; 14:00	Nepal	19–44	India	ZJNU Xiaoshan Gymnasium, Hangzhou; Referees: Ghofli, Hassanzadeh (IRI)
30 September; 14:00	B. Rai 7	(8–21)	N. Sharma 11	ZJNU Xiaoshan Gymnasium, Hangzhou; Referees: Ghofli, Hassanzadeh (IRI)
30 September; 14:00	3× (suspension)		3× (suspension)	ZJNU Xiaoshan Gymnasium, Hangzhou; Referees: Ghofli, Hassanzadeh (IRI)

30 September; 18:00	China	25–26	Japan	ZJNU Xiaoshan Gymnasium, Hangzhou; Referees: Al-Mawt, Al-Marhoon (BHR)
30 September; 18:00	Li X. 6	(11–8)	Kasai 8	ZJNU Xiaoshan Gymnasium, Hangzhou; Referees: Al-Mawt, Al-Marhoon (BHR)
30 September; 18:00	4× (suspension)		1× (suspension)	ZJNU Xiaoshan Gymnasium, Hangzhou; Referees: Al-Mawt, Al-Marhoon (BHR)

=== Final round ===
Semifinals
3 October
South Korea	30
China	23
3 October
Japan	40
Kazakhstan	22

Gold medal match
5 October
South Korea	19
Japan	29
Bronze medal match
5 October
China	39
Kazakhstan	26

==== Semifinals ====
3 October; 12:00	South Korea	30–23	China	ZJSU Sports Centre, Hangzhou; Referees: Al-Naseem, Al-Enezi (KUW)
3 October; 12:00	Ryu 7	(15–14)	Jin 7	ZJSU Sports Centre, Hangzhou; Referees: Al-Naseem, Al-Enezi (KUW)
3 October; 12:00	2× (suspension)		1× (yellow card) 2× (suspension)	ZJSU Sports Centre, Hangzhou; Referees: Al-Naseem, Al-Enezi (KUW)

3 October; 14:00	Japan	40–22	Kazakhstan	ZJSU Sports Centre, Hangzhou; Referees: Liu, Xu (CHN)
3 October; 14:00	Aizawa 6	(20–11)	Rejemetova 5	ZJSU Sports Centre, Hangzhou; Referees: Liu, Xu (CHN)
3 October; 14:00			2× (suspension)	ZJSU Sports Centre, Hangzhou; Referees: Liu, Xu (CHN)

==== Bronze medal match ====
5 October; 13:00	China	39–26	Kazakhstan	ZJSU Sports Centre, Hangzhou; Referees: Lee, Lee (KOR)
5 October; 13:00	Li X. 10	(15–13)	Khardina 10	ZJSU Sports Centre, Hangzhou; Referees: Lee, Lee (KOR)
5 October; 13:00	4× (suspension)		3× (suspension)	ZJSU Sports Centre, Hangzhou; Referees: Lee, Lee (KOR)

==== Gold medal match ====
5 October; 17:00	South Korea	19–29	Japan	ZJSU Sports Centre, Hangzhou; Referees: Al-Marhoon, Al-Mawt (BHR)
5 October; 17:00	Ryu, Gim 3	(8–14)	Aizawa 6	ZJSU Sports Centre, Hangzhou; Referees: Al-Marhoon, Al-Mawt (BHR)
5 October; 17:00	3× (suspension)		4× (suspension)	ZJSU Sports Centre, Hangzhou; Referees: Al-Marhoon, Al-Mawt (BHR)

== Final standing ==
Rank	Team	Pld	W	D	L
1st place, gold medalist(s)	Japan	6	6	0	0
2nd place, silver medalist(s)	South Korea	5	4	0	1
3rd place, bronze medalist(s)	China	6	4	0	2
4	Kazakhstan	5	2	0	3
5	India	4	1	1	2
5	Uzbekistan	3	1	0	2
7	Hong Kong	4	1	1	2
7	Thailand	3	0	0	3
9	Nepal	4	0	0	4
