= South Korea at the 2024 Summer Olympics =

- IOC code: KOR
- NOC: Korean Olympic Committee
- Website: www.sports.or.kr (in Korean and English)

in Paris, France 26 July 2024 – 11 August 2024
- Competitors: 141 (65 men and 76 women) in 23 sports
- Flag bearers (opening): Woo Sang-hyeok & Kim Seo-yeong
- Flag bearers (closing): Park Tae-joon & Im Ae-ji
- Medals Ranked 8th: Gold 13 Silver 9 Bronze 10 Total 32

Summer Olympics appearances (overview)
- 1948; 1952; 1956; 1960; 1964; 1968; 1972; 1976; 1980; 1984; 1988; 1992; 1996; 2000; 2004; 2008; 2012; 2016; 2020; 2024; 2028

South Korea, officially the Republic of Korea, competed at the 2024 Summer Olympics in Paris from 26 July to 11 August 2024. It was the nation's nineteenth appearance at the Summer Olympics, except Moscow 1980, as part of US-led boycott.

Silver medalist pistol shooter Kim Ye-ji went viral alongside Yusuf Dikeç for possessing "main character energy" and Terminator-style outfit on social media.

== Medalists ==
Medal	Name	Sport	Event	Date
Gold	Oh Sang-uk	Fencing	Men's individual sabre	27 July
Gold	Oh Ye-jin	Shooting	Women's 10 m air pistol	28 July
Gold	Jeon Hun-young; Lim Si-hyeon; Nam Su-hyeon	Archery	Women's team	28 July
Gold	Ban Hyo-jin	Shooting	Women's 10 m air rifle	29 July
Gold	Kim Je-deok; Kim Woo-jin; Lee Woo-seok	Archery	Men's team	29 July
Gold	Oh Sang-uk; Gu Bon-gil; Park Sang-won; Do Gyeong-dong	Fencing	Men's team sabre	31 July
Gold	Kim Woo-jin; Lim Si-hyeon	Archery	Mixed team	2 August
Gold	Yang Ji-in	Shooting	Women's 25 m pistol	3 August
Gold	Lim Si-hyeon	Archery	Women's individual	3 August
Gold	Kim Woo-jin	Archery	Men's individual	4 August
Gold	An Se-young	Badminton	Women's singles	5 August
Gold	Park Tae-joon	Taekwondo	Men's 58 kg	7 August
Gold	Kim Yu-jin	Taekwondo	Women's 57 kg	8 August
Silver	Keum Ji-hyeon; Park Ha-jun	Shooting	Mixed 10 m air rifle team	27 July
Silver	Kim Ye-ji	Shooting	Women's 10 m air pistol	28 July
Silver	Huh Mi-mi	Judo	Women's −57 kg	29 July
Silver	Kim Won-ho; Jeong Na-eun	Badminton	Mixed doubles	2 August
Silver	Kim Min-jong	Judo	Men's +100 kg	2 August
Silver	Nam Su-hyeon	Archery	Women's individual	3 August
Silver	Yoon Ji-su; Jeon Eun-hye; Jeon Ha-young; Choi Se-bin	Fencing	Women's team sabre	3 August
Silver	Cho Yeong-jae	Shooting	Men's 25 m rapid fire pistol	5 August
Silver	Park Hye-jeong	Weightlifting	Women's +81 kg	11 August
Bronze	Kim Woo-min	Swimming	Men's 400 m freestyle	27 July
Bronze	Lim Jong-hoon; Shin Yu-bin	Table tennis	Mixed doubles	30 July
Bronze	Lee Joon-hwan	Judo	Men's 81 kg	30 July
Bronze	Kim Ha-yun	Judo	Women's +78 kg	2 August
Bronze	Huh Mi-mi; Jung Ye-rin; Lee Hye-kyeong; Kim Ji-su; Kim Ha-yun; Yoon Hyun-ji; An Ba-ul; Kim Won-jin; Han Ju-yeop; Lee Joon-hwan; Kim Min-jong	Judo	Mixed team	3 August
Bronze	Lee Woo-seok	Archery	Men's individual	4 August
Bronze	Im Ae-ji	Boxing	Women's 54 kg	4 August
Bronze	Shin Yu-bin; Jeon Ji-hee; Lee Eun-hye	Table tennis	Women's team	10 August
Bronze	Lee Da-bin	Taekwondo	Women's +67 kg	10 August
Bronze	Seong Seung-min	Modern pentathlon	Women's	11 August

Medals by sport
Sport	1st place, gold medalist(s)	2nd place, silver medalist(s)	3rd place, bronze medalist(s)	Total
Archery	5	1	1	7
Shooting	3	3	0	6
Fencing	2	1	0	3
Taekwondo	2	0	1	3
Badminton	1	1	0	2
Judo	0	2	3	5
Weightlifting	0	1	0	1
Table tennis	0	0	2	2
Boxing	0	0	1	1
Modern pentathlon	0	0	1	1
Swimming	0	0	1	1
Total	13	9	10	32

Medals by gender
Gender	1st place, gold medalist(s)	2nd place, silver medalist(s)	3rd place, bronze medalist(s)	Total	Percentage
Female	7	5	5	17	53.1%
Male	5	2	3	10	31.3%
Mixed	1	2	2	5	15.6%
Total	13	9	10	32	100%

Medals by date
Date	1st place, gold medalist(s)	2nd place, silver medalist(s)	3rd place, bronze medalist(s)	Total
27 July	1	1	1	3
28 July	2	1	0	3
29 July	2	1	0	3
30 July	0	0	2	2
31 July	1	0	0	1
2 August	1	2	1	4
3 August	2	2	1	5
4 August	1	0	2	3
5 August	1	1	0	2
7 August	1	0	0	1
8 August	1	0	0	1
10 August	0	0	2	2
11 August	0	1	1	2
Total	13	9	10	32

Multiple medalists
Name	Sport	1st place, gold medalist(s)	2nd place, silver medalist(s)	3rd place, bronze medalist(s)	Total
Lim Si-hyeon	Archery	3	0	0	3
Kim Woo-jin	Archery	3	0	0	3
Oh Sang-uk	Fencing	2	0	0	2
Nam Su-hyeon	Archery	1	1	0	2
Lee Woo-seok	Archery	1	0	1	2
Huh Mi-mi	Judo	0	1	1	2
Kim Min-jong	Judo	0	1	1	2
Lee Joon-hwan	Judo	0	0	2	2
Kim Ha-yun	Judo	0	0	2	2
Shin Yu-bin	Table tennis	0	0	2	2

== Competitors ==
The following is the list of number of competitors in the Games.

Sport	Men	Women	Total
Archery	3	3	6
Artistic swimming	0	2	2
Athletics	3	0	3
Badminton	4	8	12
Boxing	0	2	2
Breaking	1	0	1
Cycling	1	1	2
Diving	4	2	6
Equestrian	1	0	1
Fencing	5	6	11
Golf	2	3	5
Gymnastics	3	5	8
Handball	0	14	14
Judo	5	6	11
Modern pentathlon	2	2	4
Sailing	1	0	1
Shooting	6	11	17
Sport climbing	2	1	3
Swimming	12	3	15
Table tennis	3	3	6
Taekwondo	2	2	4
Weightlifting	3	2	5
Wrestling	2	0	2
Total	65	76	141

== Archery ==
South Korea entered six archers to compete at the games. The nation fielded a full squad of men's team recurve by scoring a successful gold-medal victory and obtaining the first of three available team spots as the highest-ranked eligible nation at the 2023 World Championships in Berlin, Germany. Meanwhile, the nation qualified one individual female archer to compete in the individual recurve event by virtue of the result at the 2022 Asian Games in Hangzhou, China before earning a team quota at the 2023 Asian Archery Championships in Bangkok, Thailand.

Men

Athlete	Event	Ranking round		Round of 64	Round of 32	Round of 16	Quarterfinals	Semifinals	Final / BM	
Athlete	Event	Score	Seed	Opposition Score	Opposition Score	Opposition Score	Opposition Score	Opposition Score	Opposition Score	Rank
Kim Je-deok	Individual	682	2	Roux (RSA); W 6–0	Musolesi (ITA); W 6–4	Arcila (COL); W 6–4	Ellison (USA); L 0–6	Did not advance		
Kim Woo-jin	Individual	686	1	Madaye (CHA); W 6–0	Lin (TPE); W 6–0	D'Almeida (BRA); W 7–1	Gazoz (TUR); W 6–4	Lee (KOR); W 6–5	Ellison (USA); W 6–5	1st place, gold medalist(s)
Lee Woo-seok	Individual	681	5	Boukouvalas (AUS); W 6–0	Paoli (ITA); W 6–0	Yan (CHN); W 6–2	Nespoli (ITA); W 6–4	Kim W-j (KOR); L 5–6	Unruh (GER); W 6–0	3rd place, bronze medalist(s)
Kim Je-deok; Kim Woo-jin; Lee Woo-seok	Team	2049	1	—N/a		Bye	Japan; W 6–0	China; W 5–1	France; W 5–1	1st place, gold medalist(s)

Women

Athlete	Event	Ranking round		Round of 64	Round of 32	Round of 16	Quarterfinals	Semifinals	Final / BM	
Athlete	Event	Score	Seed	Opposition Score	Opposition Score	Opposition Score	Opposition Score	Opposition Score	Opposition Score	Rank
Jeon Hun-young	Individual	664	13	Healey (GBR); W 6–2	Schwarz (GER); W 7–1	Lei (TPE); W 6–4	Gökkır (TUR); W 6–2	Lim (KOR); L 4–6	Barbelin (FRA); L 4–6	4
Lim Si-hyeon	Individual	694 WR	1	Rivera (PUR); W 6–0	Octavia (INA); W 6–0	Havers (GBR); W 7–1	Valencia (MEX); W 6–4	Jeon (KOR); W 6–4	Nam (KOR); W 7–3	1st place, gold medalist(s)
Nam Su-hyeon	Individual	688	2	Ali (EGY); W 7–1	Horáčková (CZE); W 7–3	Amăistroaie (ROU); W 6–2	Kumari (IND); W 6–4	Barbelin (FRA); W 6–0	Lim (KOR); L 3–7	2nd place, silver medalist(s)
Jeon Hun-young; Lim Si-hyeon; Nam Su-hyeon	Team	2046 OR	1	—N/a		Bye	Chinese Taipei; W 6–2	Netherlands; W 5–4	China; W 5–4	1st place, gold medalist(s)

Mixed

Athlete	Event	Ranking round		Round of 16	Quarterfinals	Semifinals	Final / BM	
Athlete	Event	Score	Seed	Opposition Score	Opposition Score	Opposition Score	Opposition Score	Rank
Kim Woo-jin; Lim Si-hyeon	Team	1380 OR	1 Q	Chinese Taipei; W 5–4	Italy; W 6–2	India; W 6–2	Germany; W 6–0	1st place, gold medalist(s)

== Artistic swimming ==
South Korea fielded a pair of artistic swimmers to compete in the women's duet as the top three highest-ranked nations, eligible for qualification at the 2024 World Aquatics Championships in Doha, Qatar.

Athlete	Event	Technical routine		Free routine		Overall	
Athlete	Event	Points	Rank	Points	Rank	Total	Rank
Hur Yoon-seo; Lee Ri-young	Duet	227.5667	13	227.7500	13	455.3167	13

== Athletics ==
South Korean track and field athletes achieved the entry standards for Paris 2024, either by passing the direct qualifying mark (or time for track and road races) or by world ranking, in the following events (a maximum of 3 athletes each):

Key

- Note–Ranks given for track events are within the athlete's heat only
- Q = Qualified for the next round
- q = Qualified for the next round as a fastest loser or, in field events, by position without achieving the qualifying target
- NR = National record
- N/A = Round not applicable for the event
- Bye = Athlete not required to compete in round

Track and road events

Athlete	Event	Final	
Athlete	Event	Result	Rank
Choe Byeong-kwang	Men's 20 km walk	1:26:15	42

Field events

Athlete	Event	Qualification		Final	
Athlete	Event	Result	Rank	Result	Rank
Woo Sang-hyeok	Men's high jump	2.27	=3 q	2.27	7
Kim Jang-woo	Men's triple jump	16.31	26	Did not advance	

== Badminton ==
South Korea entered twelve badminton players into the Olympic tournament based on the BWF Race to Paris Rankings.

Men

Athlete	Event	Group stage				Elimination	Quarter-final	Semi-final	Final / BM	
Athlete	Event	Opposition Score	Opposition Score	Opposition Score	Rank	Opposition Score	Opposition Score	Opposition Score	Opposition Score	Rank
Jeon Hyeok-jin	Singles	Coelho (BRA); W (21–12, 21–19)	Naraoka (JPN); L (10–21, 16–21)	—N/a	2	Did not advance				
Kang Min-hyuk; Seo Seung-jae	Doubles	Král / Mendrek (CZE); W (21–12, 21–17)	C Popov / T Popov (FRA); W (21–17, 21–15)	Jomkoh / Kedren (THA); W (21–16, 21–15)	1 Q	—N/a	Astrup / Anders (DEN); L (19–21, 20–22)	Did not advance		

Women

Athlete	Event	Group stage				Elimination	Quarter-final	Semi-final	Final / BM	
Athlete	Event	Opposition Score	Opposition Score	Opposition Score	Rank	Opposition Score	Opposition Score	Opposition Score	Opposition Score	Rank
Kim Ga-eun	Singles	Scholtz (RSA); W (21–12, 21–6)	Goh JW (MAS); W (21–17, 20–22, 23–21)	—N/a	1 Q	Tunjung (INA); L (4–21, 21–8, 21–23)	Did not advance			
An Se-young	Singles	Nalbantova (BUL); W (21–15, 21–11)	Qi (FRA); W (21–5, 21–7)	—N/a	1 Q	Bye	Yamaguchi (JPN); W (15–21, 21–17, 21–8)	Tunjung (INA); W (11–21, 21–13, 21–16)	He (CHN); W (21–13, 21–16)	1st place, gold medalist(s)
Baek Ha-na; Lee So-hee	Doubles	Fruergaard / Thygesen (DEN); L (18–21, 21–9, 14–21)	Lambert / Tran (FRA); W (21–13, 21–8)	Kititharakul / Prajongjai (THA); W (21–9, 21–12)	2 Q	—N/a	Liu / Tan (CHN); L (9–21, 13–21)	Did not advance		
Kim So-yeong; Kong Hee-yong	Doubles	Crasto / Ponnappa (IND); W (21–18, 21–10)	Matsuyama / Shida (JPN); W (24–22, 26–24)	Mapasa / Yu (AUS); W (21–12, 21–17)	1 Q	—N/a	Tan / Thinaah (MAS); L (12–21, 13–21)	Did not advance		

Mixed

Athlete	Event	Group stage				Quarter-final	Semi-final	Final / BM	
Athlete	Event	Opposition Score	Opposition Score	Opposition Score	Rank	Opposition Score	Opposition Score	Opposition Score	Rank
Seo Seung-jae; Chae Yoo-jung	Doubles	K Mammeri / T Mammeri (ALG); W (21–10, 21–7)	Tabeling / Piek (NED); W (21–16, 21–12)	Puavaranukroh / Taerattanachai (THA); W (21–16, 10–21, 21–15)	1 Q	Tang / Tse (HKG); W (21–15, 21–10)	Kim / Jeong (KOR); L (16–21, 22–20, 21–23	Watanabe / Higashino (JPN); L (13–21, 20–22)	4
Kim Won-ho; Jeong Na-eun	Doubles	Rivaldy / Mentari (INA); L (20–22, 21–14, 19–21)	Gicquel / Delrue (FRA); W (22–20, 21–16)	Zheng SW / Huang YQ (CHN); L (13–21, 14–21)	2 Q	Chen / Toh (MAS); W (21–19, 21–14)	Seo / Chae (KOR); W (21–16, 20–22, 23–21)	Zheng / Huang (CHN); L (8–21, 11–21)	2nd place, silver medalist(s)

== Boxing ==
South Korea entered two boxers into the Olympic tournament. Im Ae-ji (women's bantamweight) and Oh Yeon-ji (women's lightweight) secured their spots following their triumph in the quota bouts round at the 2024 World Olympic Qualification Tournament 2 in Bangkok, Thailand.

Athlete	Event	Round of 32	Round of 16	Quarterfinals	Semifinals	Final	
Athlete	Event	Opposition Result	Opposition Result	Opposition Result	Opposition Result	Opposition Result	Rank
Im Ae-ji	Women's 54 kg	Bye	de Jesus Chagas (BRA); W 4–1	Arias (COL); W 3–2	Akbaş (TUR); L 2–3	Did not advance	3rd place, bronze medalist(s)
Oh Yeon-ji	Women's 60 kg	Wu (TPE); L 0–5	Did not advance				

== Breaking ==
South Korea entered one breakdancer to compete in the B-Boy dual battles for Paris 2024. Kim Hong-yul (Hong10) outlasted the male breakdancers from 2024 Olympic Qualifier Series in Shanghai, China and Budapest, Hungary.

Athlete	Nickname	Event	Qualification		Quarterfinal	Semifinal	Final / BM	
Athlete	Nickname	Event	Points	Rank	Opposition Result	Opposition Result	Opposition Result	Rank
Kim Hong-yul	Hong10	B-Boys	27	3	Did not advance			11

== Cycling ==
=== Road ===
South Korea entered one male and one female rider to compete in the road race events at the Olympics through the establishment of UCI Nation Ranking.

Athlete	Event	Time	Rank
Kim Eu-ro	Men's road race	6:39:27	65
Song Min-ji	Women's road race	DNF	

== Diving ==
South Korean divers secured two quota places. The nations secured one quota in the men's individual platform for Paris 2024 by virtue of top twelve individual results at the 2023 World Championships in Fukuoka, Japan; secured one quota in the women's individual springboard, by virtue of top twelve individuals, not yet qualified, at the 2024 World Aquatics Championships in Doha, Qatar; and secured three quotas from unused quota reallocation.

Athlete	Event	Preliminary		Semifinal		Final	
Athlete	Event	Points	Rank	Points	Rank	Points	Rank
Woo Ha-ram	Men's 3 m springboard	389.10	12 Q	432.00	9 Q	374.15	11
Yi Jae-gyeong	Men's 3 m springboard	381.40	16 Q	366.50	17	Did not advance	
Kim Yeong-taek	Men's 10 m platform	320.40	24	Did not advance			
Shin Jung-whi	Men's 10 m platform	369.20	17 Q	290.60	18	Did not advance	
Kim Su-ji	Women's 3 m springboard	285.50	11 Q	272.75	13	Did not advance	
Kim Na-hyun	Women's 10 m platform	250.00	26	Did not advance			

== Equestrian ==
South Korea entered one rider in the dressage event through the establishment of the final Olympic ranking because Palestine was not able to fulfil the MER requirements.

Dressage

Athlete	Horse	Event	Grand Prix		Grand Prix Freestyle		Overall	
Athlete	Horse	Event	Score	Rank	Technical	Artistic	Score	Rank
Hwang Young-shik	Delmonte	Individual	70.000	5	Did not advance			

Qualification Legend: Q = Qualified for the final based on position in group; q = Qualified for the final based on overall position

== Fencing ==
South Korea entered fourteen fencers into the Olympic competition. Ha Tae-gyu and Kim Jae-won secured their quota places in their respective divisions after being nominated as one of the two highest-ranked individual fencers, eligible for the Asia & Oceania zone; and men's sabre team, women's épée team and women's sabre team qualified for the games by becoming one of four highest ranked worldwide team, through the release of the FIE Official ranking for Paris 2024.

Men

Athlete	Event	Round of 64	Round of 32	Round of 16	Quarterfinal	Semifinal	Final / BM	
Athlete	Event	Opposition Score	Opposition Score	Opposition Score	Opposition Score	Opposition Score	Opposition Score	Rank
Kim Jae-won	Épée	Bye	Kano (JPN); L 12–14	Did not advance				
Ha Tae-gyu	Foil	Bye	Llavador (ESP); L 13–15	Did not advance				
Gu Bon-gil	Sabre	Bye	Ferjani (TUN); L 8–15	Did not advance				
Oh Sang-uk	Sabre	Bye	Girault (NIG); W 15–8	Pakdaman (IRI); W 15–10	Arfa (CAN); W 15–13	Samele (ITA); W 15–5	Ferjani (TUN); W 15–11	1st place, gold medalist(s)
Park Sang-won	Sabre	Bye	Heathcock (USA); W 15–10	Shen CP (CHN); L 11–15	Did not advance			
Gu Bon-gil; Oh Sang-uk; Park Sang-won; Do Gyeong-dong*	Team sabre	—N/a			Canada; W 45–33	France; W 45–39	Hungary; W 45–41	1st place, gold medalist(s)

Women

Athlete	Event	Round of 64	Round of 32	Round of 16	Quarterfinal	Semifinal	Final / BM	
Athlete	Event	Opposition Score	Opposition Score	Opposition Score	Opposition Score	Opposition Score	Opposition Score	Rank
Song Se-ra	Épée	Bye	Swatowska-Wenglarczyk (POL); W 15–11	Muhari (HUN); L 6–15	Did not advance			
Lee Hye-in	Épée	Bye	Yu SH (CHN); L 13–15	Did not advance				
Kang Young-mi	Épée	Bye	Differt (EST); L 13–14	Did not advance				
Song Se-ra; Lee Hye-in; Kang Young-mi; Choi In-jeong*	Team Épée	—N/a			France; L 31–37	Classifications Semifinal; United States; W 45–39	Classifications Placement 5–6; Ukraine; W 45–38	5
Yoon Ji-su	Sabre	Bye	Dayibekova (UZB); W 15–11	Brunet (FRA); L 9–15	Did not advance			
Choi Se-bin	Sabre	Bye	Nazlymov (USA); W 15–14	Emura (JPN); W 15–7	Jeon (KOR); W 15–14	Brunet (FRA); L 12–15	Kharlan (UKR); L 14–15	4
Jeon Ha-young	Sabre	Bye	Komashchuk (UKR); W 15–8	Hafez (EGY); W 15–7	Choi (KOR); L 14–15	Did not advance		5
Yoon Ji-su; Choi Se-bin; Jeon Ha-young; Jeon Eun-hye*	Team sabre	—N/a			United States; W 45–35	France; W 45–36	Ukraine; L 42–45	2nd place, silver medalist(s)

== Golf ==
South Korea entered two male and three female golfers into the Olympic tournament. All of them qualified directly for the games in the individual competitions based on their world ranking performance on the IGF World Rankings.

Athlete	Event	Round 1	Round 2	Round 3	Round 4	Total		
Athlete	Event	Score	Score	Score	Score	Score	Par	Rank
Tom Kim	Men's	66	68	69	68	271	−13	8
An Byeong-hun	Men's	72	68	70	70	278	−6	T24
Amy Yang	Women's	72	71	70	69	282	−6	T4
Kim Hyo-joo	Women's	76	70	73	69	288	E	T25
Ko Jin-young	Women's	73	73	73	69	288	E	T25

== Gymnastics ==
=== Artistic ===
South Korea entered eight gymnasts into Paris. South Korea's men's team earned the right to send an individual gymnast to the Games by finishing as one of the three strongest non-qualified nations at the 2023 World Artistic Gymnastics Championships. Lee Jun-ho also officially booked his Olympic ticket at the same championships as one of the highest-ranked eight All-Around gymnasts who did not have a pathway to Paris as part of a qualified team. One more Olympic quota was assured for Korea through the FIG World Cup Series 2024. Meanwhile, five other female gymnasts qualified for the games after advancing to the final round of team all-around, and obtained one of nine available team spot's for nation's, not yet qualified, at the 2023 World Championships in Antwerp, Belgium.

Men
Individual finals

Athlete	Event	Qualification								Final							
Athlete	Event	Apparatus						Total	Rank	Apparatus						Total	Rank
Athlete	Event	F	PH	R	V	PB	HB	Total	Rank	F	PH	R	V	PB	HB	Total	Rank
Lee Jun-ho	All-around	13.700	11.200	13.600	14.383	13.600	12.266	78.899	38	Did not advance							
Hur Woong	Pommel horse	—N/a	14.900	—N/a				14.900	7 Q	—N/a	14.300	—N/a				14.300	7
Ryu Sung-hyun	Floor	14.266	—N/a					14.266	10	Did not advance							

Women
Team

Athlete	Event	Qualification						Final					
Athlete	Event	Apparatus				Total	Rank	Apparatus				Total	Rank
Athlete	Event	V	UB	BB	F	Total	Rank	V	UB	BB	F	Total	Rank
Yeo Seo-jeong	Team	14.400 Q	—N/a	12.700	12.733	—N/a		Did not advance				—N/a	
Eom Do-hyun	Team	—N/a	12.233	12.300	12.366	—N/a		Did not advance				—N/a	
Lee Da-yeong	Team	12.866	~~11.766~~	—N/a				Did not advance				—N/a	
Lee Yun-seo	Team	12.700	12.333	~~12.000~~	~~10.066~~	47.099	56	Did not advance				—N/a	
Shin Sol-yi	Team	~~12.133~~	12.966	12.366	12.533	49.998	52	Did not advance				—N/a	
Total	Team	39.966	37.532	37.366	37.632	152.496	12	Did not advance					

Individual finals

Athlete	Event	Qualification						Final					
Athlete	Event	Apparatus				Total	Rank	Apparatus				Total	Rank
Athlete	Event	V	UB	BB	F	Total	Rank	V	UB	BB	F	Total	Rank
Yeo Seo-jeong	Vault	14.183	—N/a			14.183	5 Q	13.416	—N/a			13.416	7

== Handball ==
Summary

Key:

- ET: After extra time
- P – Match decided by penalty-shootout.

Team	Event	Group Stage						Quarterfinal	Semifinal	Final / BM	
Team	Event	Opposition Score	Opposition Score	Opposition Score	Opposition Score	Opposition Score	Rank	Opposition Score	Opposition Score	Opposition Score	Rank
South Korea women's	Women's tournament	Germany; W 23–22	Slovenia; L 23–30	Norway; L 20–26	Sweden; L 21–27	Denmark; L 20–28	5	Did not advance			10

=== Women's tournament ===
South Korea women's national handball team qualified for the Olympics by winning the gold medal and securing an outright berth at the 2023 Asian Qualification Tournament in Hiroshima, Japan.

Team roster

A 22-player squad was announced on 14 May 2024. It was reduced to 17 players on 2 July 2024.

Head coach: (Sweden) Henrik Signell

No.	Pos.	Name	Date of birth (age)	Height	App.	Goals	Club
2	RW	Song Ji-young	5 May 1995 (aged 29)	1.64 m	29	55	(South Korea) Seoul City
7	LW	Shin Eun-joo	9 September 1993 (aged 30)	1.70 m	56	106	(South Korea) Incheon City
11	RB	Ryu Eun-hee	24 February 1990 (aged 34)	1.79 m	171	524	(Hungary) Győri ETO KC
12	GK	Jeong Jin-hui	24 March 1999 (aged 25)	1.80 m	33	0	(South Korea) Seoul City
16	GK	Park Sae-young	11 August 1994 (aged 29)	1.76 m	67	0	(South Korea) Wonderful Samcheok
18	LB	Han Mi-seul	13 August 1993 (aged 30)	1.78 m	48	79	(South Korea) Incheon City
19	P	Kang Eun-hye	17 April 1996 (aged 28)	1.86 m	65	90	(South Korea) SK Sugar Gliders
23	LB	Woo Bit-na	23 October 2001 (aged 22)	1.72 m	10	36	(South Korea) Seoul City
24	CB	Kang Kyung-min	8 November 1996 (aged 27)	1.65 m	19	42	(South Korea) SK Sugar Gliders
26	RB	Kang Eun-seo	4 March 1999 (aged 25)	1.69 m	6	1	(South Korea) Incheon City
27	RW	Jeon Ji-yeon	2 May 2003 (aged 21)	1.68 m	5	5	(South Korea) Wonderful Samcheok
29	LB	Kim Da-young	16 September 1996 (aged 27)	1.70 m	0	0	(South Korea) Busan
31	P	Gim Bo-eun	8 December 1997 (aged 26)	1.77 m	32	68	(South Korea) Wonderful Samcheok
33	CB	Shin Jin-mi	23 June 1998 (aged 26)	1.67 m	6	9	(South Korea) Busan

Group play

Pos	Team	Pld	W	D	L	GF	GA	GD	Pts	Qualification
1	Norway	5	4	0	1	140	110	+30	8 (Note: Norway 2 Pts, +5 GD; Sweden 2 Pts, +2 GD; Denmark 2 Pts, −7 GD.)	Quarterfinals
2	Sweden	5	4	0	1	140	125	+15	8	Quarterfinals
3	Denmark	5	4	0	1	126	116	+10	8	Quarterfinals
4	Germany	5	1	0	4	136	134	+2	2 (Note: Germany 2 Pts, +18 GD; South Korea 2 Pts, −6 GD; Slovenia 2 Pts, −12 GD.)	Quarterfinals
5	South Korea	5	1	0	4	107	133	−26	2	
6	Slovenia	5	1	0	4	116	147	−31	2	

Source: Olympics Paris 2024 rankings
Rules for classification: 1) Points; 2) Head-to-head points; 3) Head-to-head goal difference; 4) Head-to-head goals scored; 5) Goal difference; 6) Goals scored; 7) Draw.
Notes:

25 July 2024; 16:00	Germany	22–23	South Korea	Paris Expo Porte de Versailles, Paris; Attendance: 5,765; Referees: Belkhiri, Hamidi (ALG)
25 July 2024; 16:00	Döll 6	(10–11)	Kang K., Ryu 6	Paris Expo Porte de Versailles, Paris; Attendance: 5,765; Referees: Belkhiri, Hamidi (ALG)
25 July 2024; 16:00	2× (suspension)	Report	2× (suspension) 1× (red card)	Paris Expo Porte de Versailles, Paris; Attendance: 5,765; Referees: Belkhiri, Hamidi (ALG)

28 July 2024; 11:00	South Korea	23–30	Slovenia	Paris Expo Porte de Versailles, Paris; Attendance: 5,819; Referees: Bíró, Kiss (HUN)
28 July 2024; 11:00	Woo 7	(12–14)	Mavsar 7	Paris Expo Porte de Versailles, Paris; Attendance: 5,819; Referees: Bíró, Kiss (HUN)
28 July 2024; 11:00	1× (yellow card) 2× (suspension)	Report	1× (suspension)	Paris Expo Porte de Versailles, Paris; Attendance: 5,819; Referees: Bíró, Kiss (HUN)

30 July 2024; 11:00	Norway	26–20	South Korea	Paris Expo Porte de Versailles, Paris; Attendance: 5,852; Referees: Brunner, Salah (SUI)
30 July 2024; 11:00	Skogrand 5	(13–11)	Ryu 6	Paris Expo Porte de Versailles, Paris; Attendance: 5,852; Referees: Brunner, Salah (SUI)
30 July 2024; 11:00	1× (yellow card) 2× (suspension)	Report	1× (suspension)	Paris Expo Porte de Versailles, Paris; Attendance: 5,852; Referees: Brunner, Salah (SUI)

1 August 2024; 11:00	South Korea	21–27	Sweden	Paris Expo Porte de Versailles, Paris; Attendance: 5,653; Referees: García, Paolantoni (ARG)
1 August 2024; 11:00	Kang K. 5	(11–16)	Lindqvist 5	Paris Expo Porte de Versailles, Paris; Attendance: 5,653; Referees: García, Paolantoni (ARG)
1 August 2024; 11:00	2× (suspension)	Report		Paris Expo Porte de Versailles, Paris; Attendance: 5,653; Referees: García, Paolantoni (ARG)

3 August 2024; 21:00	Denmark	28–20	South Korea	Paris Expo Porte de Versailles, Paris; Attendance: 5,714; Referees: García, Marín (ESP)
3 August 2024; 21:00	Hansen, Jørgensen 6	(12–8)	Woo 5	Paris Expo Porte de Versailles, Paris; Attendance: 5,714; Referees: García, Marín (ESP)
3 August 2024; 21:00	1× (yellow card) 4× (suspension)	Report		Paris Expo Porte de Versailles, Paris; Attendance: 5,714; Referees: García, Marín (ESP)

== Judo ==
South Korea has qualified eleven judokas via the IJF World Ranking List and continental quotas in Asia.

Athlete	Event	Round of 64	Round of 32	Round of 16	Quarterfinals	Semifinals	Repechage	Final / BM	
Athlete	Event	Opposition Result	Opposition Result	Opposition Result	Opposition Result	Opposition Result	Opposition Result	Opposition Result	Rank
Kim Won-jin	Men's −60 kg	—N/a	Zulu (ZAM); W 10–00	Aghayev (AZE); W 10–00	Mkheidze (FRA); L 00–01	Did not advance	Sardalashvili (GEO); L 00–10	Did not advance	
An Ba-ul	Men's −66 kg	—N/a	Baynamunkh (UAE); W 10–00	Kyrgyzbayev (KAZ); L 00–01	Did not advance				
Lee Joon-hwan	Men's −81 kg	Bye	Moutii (MAR); W 01–00	Muki (ISR); W 10–00	Boltaboev (UZB); W 10–00	Grigalashvili (GEO); L 00–01	—N/a	Casse (BEL); W 01–00	3rd place, bronze medalist(s)
Han Ju-yeop	Men's −90 kg	—N/a	Kone (BUR); W 10–00	Jayne (USA); W 01–00	Bekauri (GEO); L 00–10	Did not advance	Macedo (BRA); L 00–11	Did not advance	
Kim Min-jong	Men's +100 kg	—N/a	Bye	Tataroglu (TUR); W 11–00	Kokauri (AZE); W 01–00	Saito (JPN); W 10–00	—N/a	Riner (FRA); L 00–10	2nd place, silver medalist(s)
Lee Hye-kyeong	Women's −48 kg	—N/a	Babulfath (SWE); L 00–10	Did not advance					
Jung Ye-rin	Women's −52 kg	—N/a	Primo (ISR); L 00–10	Did not advance					
Huh Mi-mi	Women's −57 kg	—N/a	Bye	Nelson Levy (ISR); W 10–00	Lkhagvatogoo (MGL); W 01–00	Silva (BRA); W 01–00	—N/a	Deguchi (CAN); L 00–10	2nd place, silver medalist(s)
Kim Ji-su	Women's −63 kg	—N/a	Timo (POR); W 10–00	van Lieshout (NED); W 01–00	Krišto (CRO); L 00–10	Did not advance	Piovesana (AUT); L 00–10	Did not advance	
Yoon Hyun-ji	Women's −78 kg	—N/a	Reid (GBR); W 10–00	Ma (CHN); L 01–10	Did not advance				
Kim Ha-yun	Women's +78 kg	—N/a	Bye	Morillo (DOM); W 10–00	Souza (BRA); L 00–01	Did not advance	Cerić (BIH); W 01–00	Özdemir (TUR); W 10–00	3rd place, bronze medalist(s)

Mixed

Athlete	Event	Round of 32	Round of 16	Quarterfinals	Semifinals	Repechage	BM	
Athlete	Event	Opposition Result	Opposition Result	Opposition Result	Opposition Result	Opposition Result	Opposition Result	Rank
Huh Mi-mi; Jung Ye-rin; Lee Hye-kyeong; Kim Ji-su; Kim Ha-yun; Yoon Hyun-ji; An Ba-ul; Kim Won-jin; Han Ju-yeop; Lee Joon-hwan; Kim Min-jong	Team	Bye	Turkey; W 4–1	France; L 1–4	Did not advance	Uzbekistan; W 4–2	Germany; W 4–3	3rd place, bronze medalist(s)

== Modern pentathlon ==
South Korean modern pentathletes confirmed four quota places for Paris 2024. Jun Woong-tae and Kim Sun-woo secured their spots in the men's and women's events by winning the gold and silver medal in their respective classes and obtained one of five available spots at the 2022 Asian Games in Hangzhou, China; meanwhile, Seong Seung-min and Seo Chang-wan, qualified for the games, respectively through the 2024 UIPM World Championships in Zhengzhou, China, and final Olympics ranking.

Semi-finals

Athlete	Event	Fencing (épée one touch)				Swimming (200 m freestyle)			Riding (show jumping)			Combined: shooting/running (10 m laser pistol)/(3000 m)			Total points	Final rank
Athlete	Event	RR	BR	Rank	MP points	Time	Rank	MP points	Penalties	Rank	MP points	Time	Rank	MP points	Total points	Final rank
Jun Woong-tae	Men's	235	2	2	237	1:59.90	4	311	14	11	286	10:19.14	8	681	1515	2 Q
Seo Chang-wan	Men's	225	0	7	225	2:00.79	5	309	0	5	300	10:31.53	12	669	1503	5 Q
Kim Sun-woo	Women's	220	0	6	220	2:14.44	4	282	0	2	300	11:46.64	9	594	1396	5 Q
Seong Seung-min	Women's	225	0	4	225	2:12.44	4	286	7	8	293	11:44.13	8	596	1400	4 Q

Finals

Athlete	Event	Fencing (épée one touch)				Swimming (200 m freestyle)			Riding (show jumping)			Combined: shooting/running (10 m laser pistol)/(3000 m)			Total points	Final rank
Athlete	Event	RR	BR	Rank	MP points	Time	Rank	MP points	Penalties	Rank	MP points	Time	Rank	MP points	Total points	Final rank
Jun Woong-tae	Men's	235	6	2	241	1:59.41	7	312	13	11	287	10:14.33	13	686	1526	6
Seo Chang-wan	Men's	225	4	6	229	2:01.53	8	307	14	12	286	10:02.33	10	698	1520	7
Kim Sun-woo	Women's	220	2	8	222	2:17.67	11	275	14	16	286	11:13.92	9	627	1410	8
Seong Seung-min	Women's	225	0	7	225	2:11.47	2	288	0	2	300	11:12.87	8	628	1441	3rd place, bronze medalist(s)

== Sailing ==
A South Korean sailor secured a quota place in the following events through the 2024 Semaine Olympique Française (Last Chance Regatta) in Hyères, France.

Medal race events

Athlete	Event	Race																Net points	Final rank
Athlete	Event	1	2	3	4	5	6	7	8	9	10	11	12	13	14	15	M*	Net points	Final rank
Ha Jee-min	Men's ILCA 7	30	32	~~40~~	9	24	22	1	22	Can		—N/a					Did not advance	140	26

== Shooting ==
South Korean shooters achieved quota places for the following events based on their results at the 2022 and 2023 ISSF World Championships, 2023 and 2024 Asian Championships, and 2024 ISSF World Olympic Qualification Tournament.

Men

Athlete	Event	Qualification		Final	
Athlete	Event	Points	Rank	Points	Rank
Choe Dae-han	10 m air rifle	630.8	5 Q	145.2	7
Park Ha-jun	10 m air rifle	629.2	13	Did not advance	
Park Ha-jun	50 m rifle three positions	572	44	Did not advance	
Lee Won-ho	10 m air pistol	580	4 Q	197.9	4
Cho Yeong-jae	10 m air pistol	575	14	Did not advance	
Cho Yeong-jae	25 m rapid fire pistol	586	4 Q	25	2nd place, silver medalist(s)
Song Jong-ho	25 m rapid fire pistol	580	17	Did not advance	
Kim Min-su	Skeet	118	16	Did not advance	

Women

Athlete	Event	Qualification		Final	
Athlete	Event	Points	Rank	Points	Rank
Keum Ji-hyeon	10 m air rifle	630.9	9	Did not advance	
Ban Hyo-jin	10 m air rifle	634.5	1 Q	251.8	1st place, gold medalist(s)
Lee Eun-seo	50 m rifle three positions	583	19	Did not advance	
Im Ha-na	50 m rifle three positions	577	30	Did not advance	
Kim Ye-ji	10 m air pistol	578	5 Q	241.3	2nd place, silver medalist(s)
Oh Ye-jin	10 m air pistol	582	2 Q	243.2	1st place, gold medalist(s)
Kim Ye-ji	25 m pistol	575	27	Did not advance	
Yang Ji-in	25 m pistol	586	6 Q	37	1st place, gold medalist(s)
Jang Kook-hee	Skeet	115	21	Did not advance	
Kang Gee-eun	Trap	114	20	Did not advance	
Lee Bo-na	Trap	113	24	Did not advance	

Mixed

Athlete	Event	Qualification		Final	
Athlete	Event	Points	Rank	Points	Rank
Keum Ji-hyeon; Park Ha-jun	10 m air rifle team	631.4	2 QG	Huang YT / Sheng LH (CHN); L 12–16	2nd place, silver medalist(s)
Ban Hyo-jin; Choe Dae-han	10 m air rifle team	623.7	22	Did not advance	
Oh Ye-jin; Lee Won-ho	10 m air pistol team	579	4 QB	Singh / Bhaker (IND); L 10–16	4
Kim Ye-ji; Cho Yeong-jae	10 m air pistol team	577	7	Did not advance	
Jang Kook-hee; Kim Min-su	Skeet team	144	7	Did not advance	

== Sport climbing ==
South Korea qualified three sport climbers for Paris 2024. Shin Eun-cheol, Lee Do-hyun, and Seo Chae-hyun all qualified directly for games through the 2024 Olympic Qualifier series ranking.

Boulder & lead combined

Athlete	Event	Qualification						Final					
Athlete	Event	Boulder		Lead		Total	Rank	Boulder		Lead		Total	Rank
Athlete	Event	Result	Place	Result	Place	Total	Rank	Result	Place	Result	Place	Total	Rank
Lee Do-hyun	Men's	34.0	10	12.0	17	46.0	15	Did not advance					
Seo Chae-hyun	Women's	44.2	13	72.1	=4	116.3	8 Q	28.9	8	76.1	4	105.0	6

Speed

Athlete	Event	Qualification		Round of 16	Quarterfinals	Semifinals	Final / BM	
Athlete	Event	Time	Rank	Opposition Time	Opposition Time	Opposition Time	Opposition Time	Rank
Shin Eun-cheol	Men's	5.25	10	Wu (CHN); L 7.24–5.00	Did not advance			12

== Swimming ==
South Korean swimmers achieved the entry standards in the following events for Paris 2024 (a maximum of two swimmers under the Olympic Qualifying Time (OST) and potentially at the Olympic Consideration Time (OCT)):

Men

Athlete	Event	Heat		Semifinal		Final	
Athlete	Event	Time	Rank	Time	Rank	Time	Rank
Ji Yu-chan	50 m freestyle	22.16	28	Did not advance			
Hwang Sun-woo	100 m freestyle	48.41	16 Q	WD		Did not advance	
Hwang Sun-woo	200 m freestyle	1:46.13	4 Q	1:45.92	9	Did not advance	
Kim Woo-min	200 m freestyle	1:46.64	12 Q	1:46.58	12	Did not advance	
Kim Woo-min	400 m freestyle	3:45.52	7 Q	—N/a		3:42.50	3rd place, bronze medalist(s)
Lee Ju-ho	100 m backstroke	54.65	30	Did not advance			
Lee Ju-ho	200 m backstroke	1:57.39	10 Q	1:56.76	11	Did not advance	
Choi Dong-yeol	100 m breaststroke	1:00.17	18	Did not advance			
Cho Sung-jae	200 m breaststroke	2:09.45	1 Q	2:10.03	12	Did not advance	
Kim Min-seop	200 m butterfly	1:56.02	15 Q	1:55.22	13	Did not advance	
Lee Ho-joon; Lee Yoo-yeon; Kim Yeong-hyeon; Kim Woo-min; Hwang Sun-woo; Yang Jae-hoon	4 × 200 m freestyle relay	7:07.96	7 Q	—N/a		7:07.26	6
Lee Ju-ho; Choi Dong-yeol; Kim Ji-hun; Hwang Sun-woo	4 × 100 m medley relay	3:34.68	13	—N/a		Did not advance	

Women

Athlete	Event	Heat		Semifinal		Final	
Athlete	Event	Time	Rank	Time	Rank	Time	Rank
Lee Eun-ji	200 m backstroke	2:09.88	10 Q	2:11.86	15	Did not advance	
Kim Seo-yeong	200 m individual medley	2:12.42	17	Did not advance			

Mixed

Athlete	Event	Heat		Semifinal		Final	
Athlete	Event	Time	Rank	Time	Rank	Time	Rank
Lee Eun-ji; Choi Dong-yeol; Kim Ji-hun; Hur Yeon-kyung	4 × 100 m medley relay	3:48.78	15	—N/a		Did not advance	

== Table tennis ==
South Korea entered a full squad of male and female table tennis players into the Games by advancing to the quarter-finals round through the 2024 World Team Table Tennis Championships in Busan. The nations also entered mixed doubles pair through the allocations of world ranking.

Men

Athlete	Event	Preliminary	Round of 64	Round of 32	Round of 16	Quarterfinals	Semifinals	Final / BM	
Athlete	Event	Opposition Result	Opposition Result	Opposition Result	Opposition Result	Opposition Result	Opposition Result	Opposition Result	Rank
Cho Dae-seong	Singles	Bye	Jha (USA); L 2–4	Did not advance					
Jang Woo-jin	Singles	Bye	González (PUR); W 4–1	Groth (DEN); W 4–1	Togami (JPN); W 4–0	Calderano (BRA); L 0–4	Did not advance		
Cho Dae-seong; Jang Woo-jin; Lim Jong-hoon	Team	—N/a			Croatia; W 3–0	China; L 0–3	Did not advance		

Women

Athlete	Event	Preliminary	Round of 64	Round of 32	Round of 16	Quarterfinals	Semifinals	Bronze medal match	
Athlete	Event	Opposition Result	Opposition Result	Opposition Result	Opposition Result	Opposition Result	Opposition Result	Opposition Result	Rank
Jeon Ji-hee	Singles	Bye	Fu (POR); L 0–4	Did not advance					
Shin Yu-bin	Singles	Bye	Tapper (AUS); W 4–0	Póta (HUN); W 4–1	Zhang (USA); W 4–0	Hirano (JPN); W 4–3	Meng (CHN); L 0–4	Hayata (JPN); L 2–4	4
Shin Yu-bin; Jeon Ji-hee; Lee Eun-hye	Team	—N/a			Brazil; W 3–1	Sweden; W 3–0	China; L 0–3	Germany; W 3–0	3rd place, bronze medalist(s)

Mixed

Athlete	Event	Round of 16	Quarterfinal	Semifinal	Bronze medal match	
Athlete	Event	Opposition Result	Opposition Result	Opposition Result	Opposition Result	Rank
Lim Jong-hoon; Shin Yu-bin	Doubles	Qiu (GER); Mittelham (GER); W 4–0	Ionescu (ROU); Szőcs (ROU); W 4–0	Wang (CHN); Sun (CHN); L 2–4	Doo (HKG); Wong (HKG); W 4–0	3rd place, bronze medalist(s)

== Taekwondo ==
South Korea qualified four athletes to compete at the games. Park Tae-joon, Seo Geon-woo and Lee Da-bin qualified for their games in their own respective division after being nominated one of the five highest-ranked eligible athletes through the WT final rankings. Later on, Kim Yu-jin joined the nations squad following the triumph of her victory in the semifinal rounds in her class at the 2024 Asian Qualification Tournament in Tai'an, China.

Athlete	Event	Qualification	Round of 16	Quarterfinals	Semifinals	Repechage	Final / BM	
Athlete	Event	Opposition Result	Opposition Result	Opposition Result	Opposition Result	Opposition Result	Opposition Result	Rank
Park Tae-joon	Men's −58 kg	Bye	Granado (VEN); W 2–0	Ravet (FRA); W 2–1	Jendoubi (TUN); W 2–0	—N/a	Magomedo (AZE); W 1–0 WWD	1st place, gold medalist(s)
Seo Geon-woo	Men's −80 kg	Bye	Churchill (CHI); W 2–1	Rodrigues (BRA); W 2–0	Barkhordari (IRI); L 1–2	—N/a	Hrnic (DEN); L 0–2	5
Kim Yu-jin	Women's −57 kg	—N/a	İlgün (TUR); W 2–0	Park (CAN); W 2–0	Luo (CHN); W 2–1	—N/a	Kiani (IRN); W 2–0	1st place, gold medalist(s)
Lee Da-bin	Women's +67 kg	—N/a	Štolbová (CZE); W 2–0	Zhou (CHN); W 2–1	Osipova (UZB); L 0–2	—N/a	Brandl (GER); W 2–1	3rd place, bronze medalist(s)

== Weightlifting ==
South Korea entered five weightlifters into the Olympic competition. Bak Joo-hyo (men's 73 kg), Yu Dong-ju (men's 89 kg), Jang Yeon-hak (men's 102 kg), Kim Su-hyeon (women's 81 kg) and Park Hye-jeong (women's +81 kg), secured one of the top ten slots in their respective weight divisions based on the IWF Olympic Qualification Rankings.

Athlete	Event	Snatch		Clean & Jerk		Total	Rank
Athlete	Event	Result	Rank	Result	Rank	Total	Rank
Bak Joo-hyo	Men's −73 kg	147	10	187	5	334	7
Yu Dong-ju	Men's −89 kg	168	7	203	6	371	6
Jang Yeon-hak	Men's −102 kg	173	8	200	9	373	9
Kim Su-hyeon	Women's −81 kg	110	6	140	6	250	6
Park Hye-jeong	Women's +81 kg	131	2	168	2	299	2nd place, silver medalist(s)

== Wrestling ==
South Korea qualified two wrestlers into the Olympic competition. Kim Seung-jun and Lee Seung-chan qualified for the games following the triumph of winning the semifinal round at the 2024 Asian Olympic Qualification Tournament in Bishkek, Kyrgyzstan.

Key:

- VT (ranking points: 5–0 or 0–5) – Victory by fall.
- VB (ranking points: 5–0 or 0–5) – Victory by injury (VF for forfeit, VA for withdrawal or disqualification)
- PP (ranking points: 3–1 or 1–3) – Decision by points – the loser with technical points.
- PO (ranking points: 3–0 or 0–3) – Decision by points – the loser without technical points.
- ST (ranking points: 4–0 or 0–4) – Great superiority – the loser without technical points and a margin of victory of at least 8 (Greco-Roman) or 10 (freestyle) points.
- SP (ranking points: 4–1 or 1–4) – Technical superiority – the loser with technical points and a margin of victory of at least 8 (Greco-Roman) or 10 (freestyle) points.

Greco-Roman

Athlete	Event	Round of 16	Quarterfinal	Semifinal	Repechage	Final / BM	
Athlete	Event	Opposition Result	Opposition Result	Opposition Result	Opposition Result	Opposition Result	Rank
Kim Seung-jun	Men's −97 kg	Aleksanyan (ARM); L 0–9ST	Did not advance		Assakalov (UZB); L 2–8^{PP}	Did not advance	
Lee Seung-chan	Men's −130 kg	López (CUB); L 0–7^{PO}	Did not advance		Mirzazadeh (IRI); L 0–9ST	Did not advance	

Freestyle

Athlete	Event	Round of 16	Quarterfinal	Semifinal	Repechage	Final / BM	
Athlete	Event	Opposition Result	Opposition Result	Opposition Result	Opposition Result	Opposition Result	Rank
Lee Han-bit	Women's −62 kg	Niemesch (GER); L 0–3^{PO}	Did not advance				

== Incident ==
During the Parade of Nations, South Korea was incorrectly introduced as "Democratic People's Republic of Korea" (North Korea) instead of "Republic of Korea" from both French and English announcers by mistake.
