= Atsuko Baba =

Japanese handball player (born 1995)

Personal information
- Nationality: Japanese
- Born: 13 June 1995 (age 31)
- Height: 1.64 m (5 ft 5 in)

Sport
- Sport: Handball
- Position: Goalkeeper
- Current club: Hokkoku Bank

Senior clubs
- Years: Team
- 2018-: Hokkoku Bank
National team
Years	Team	Apps	(Gls)
–	Japan	16	(0)
Medal record
Asian Games
Gold medal – first place	2022 Hangzhou	Team
Asian Championship
Gold medal – first place	2024 India
Silver medal – second place	2022 South Korea
- Updated on 7 November 2023

Atsuko Baba (born 13 June 1995) is a Japanese female handball player for Hokkoku Bank and the Japanese national team.

She represented Japan at the 2021 World Women's Handball Championship in Spain. At the 2022 Asian Championship, she won silver medals, losing to South Korea in the final.

At the 2024 Asian Championship she won gold medals with the Japanese team.

With her club Hokkoku Bank she has won the Japan Handball League 5 times.
