= Hikaru Matsumoto =

Japanese handball player (born 1995)

Personal information
- Nationality: Japanese
- Born: 25 February 1995 (age 31)
- Height: 1.67 m (5 ft 6 in)

Sport
- Sport: Handball
- Position: Left wing
- Current club: Hokkoku Bank
National team
Years	Team	Apps	(Gls)
2021–	Japan	12	(32)
Medal record
Asian Games
Gold medal – first place	2022 Hangzhou	Team
Asian Championship
Silver medal – second place	2022 South Korea
- Updated on 7 November 2023

Hikaru Matsumoto (born 25 February 1995) is a Japanese female handball player for Hokkoku Bank and the Japanese national team.

She represented Japan at the 2021 World Women's Handball Championship in Spain.

At the 2022 Asian Championship, she won silver medals, losing to South Korea in the final.
