= India national handball team =

India national handball team may refer to:

- India men's national handball team
- India women's national handball team
