= Jo Su-yeon =

South Korean handball player (born 1994)

Personal information
- Nationality: South Korean
- Born: 6 July 1994 (age 32)
- Height: 1.74 m (5 ft 9 in)

Sport
- Sport: Handball
- Position: Left back
- Current club: SK Sugar Gliders
National team
| Years | Team | Apps | (Gls) |
| – | South Korea | 19 | (15) |
Medal record
Asian Games
| Silver medal – second place | 2022 Hangzhou | Team |
Asian Championship
| Gold medal – first place | 2022 South Korea |
- Updated on 13 November 2023

Jo Su-yeon (Korean: 조수연, born 6 July 1994) is a South Korean handball player for the SK Sugar Gliders and South Korean national team.

She participated at the 2015 World Women's Handball Championship, the 2015 Summer Universiade, and the 2022 Asian Games.
