= Lee Mi-gyeong (handballer) =

South Korean handball player (born 1991)

Personal information
- Nationality: South Korean
- Born: 2 October 1991 (age 35) Seoul, South Korea
- Height: 1.70 m (5 ft 7 in)

Sport
- Sport: Handball
- Position: Centre back
- Current club: Busan Infrastructure Corp.
- Number: 23

Senior clubs
- Years: Team
- 2010-2014: Seoul City Handball Club
- 2014-2016: Wonderful Daegu
- 2016-2019: Hiroshima Maple Reds
- 2019-2020: Busan BISCO
- 2021-2022: Omron Handball
- 2023-: Busan Infrastructure Corp.
National team
Years	Team	Apps
–	South Korea	19
Medal record
Asian Games
Silver medal – second place	2022 Hangzhou	Team
Asian Championship
Gold medal – first place	2017 South Korea
Gold medal – first place	2018 Japan
Gold medal – first place	2021 Jordan
Gold medal – first place	2022 South Korea
Asian Junior Championship
Gold medal – first place	2009 Thailand
Asian Youth Championship
Gold medal – first place	2007 Taiwan

Korean name
- Hangul: 이미경
- RR: I Migyeong
- MR: I Migyŏng

Lee Mi-gyeong (Korean: 이미경; born 2 October 1991) is a South Korean handball player for Busan BISCO and the South Korean national team.

== Club career ==
Lee started her club career in the Seoul City handball club in 2010. After being hampered by several injuries in Seoul for 4 years, Lee moved to Wonderful Daegu in 2014. She went on to become the key player in the Daegu's regular lineup, leading the team's offense in assists and goals every season in the Handball Korea League. In 2016 The Hiroshima Maple Reds of the Japan Handball League signed Lee. Lee compiled 358 goals in 50 games in the JHL while playing in the Hiroshima Maple Reds and Hidatakayama Black Bulls for 3 years. In 2019 Lee returned to South Korea to play for the Busan BISCO handball club.

In 2021 she returned to Japan and joined Omron Handball, where she played for a single season before joining Busan Infrastructure Corp.

== National team ==
Lee was named to the team representing South Korea at the Summer Olympics held from 27 July to 12 August 2012 in London, United Kingdom. While South Korea had seized six medals, including gold in 1988 and 1992, in seven Olympic women's handball appearances, Lee and her team failed to win medals at the 2012 Olympics by losing to Spain 31–29 in double overtime in the bronze medal match.

In 2017, Lee was named to the national team which competed in the IHF World Championships in Germany. The team advanced to round of 16 and faced world No. 2 ranked Russia. Despite 11 goals from Lee and 10 from Ryu Eun-hee, South Korea fell 36–35 after extra time.

In December 2019 Lee was called up to the South Korean national team and competed in the 2019 IHF World Handball Championship.
