= Tian Xiuxiu =

Chinese handball player (born 1996)

Personal information
- Nationality: Chinese
- Born: 13 January 1996 (age 30)
- Height: 1.70 m (5 ft 7 in)

Sport
- Sport: Handball
- Position: Left back
- Current club: Shandong Handball
National team
Years	Team	Apps	(Gls)
–	China	52	(78)
Medal record
Asian Games
Bronze medal – third place	2022 Hangzhou	Team
Asian Championship
Bronze medal – third place	2018 Japan
Bronze medal – third place	2022 South Korea

Tian Xiuxiu (Chinese: 田秀秀, born 13 January 1996) is a Chinese handball player for Shandong Handball and the Chinese national team.

She competed at the 2015 World Women's Handball Championship in Denmark.
