= Asha Rani =

Asha Rani may refer to:

- Asha Rani (politician)
- Asha Rani (handballer)
- Asha Rani, the stage name of Niveditha Arjun
