= Shin Eun-joo =

South Korean handball player (born 1993)

Personal information
- Nationality: South Korean
- Born: 9 September 1993 (age 33)
- Height: 1.70 m (5 ft 7 in)

Sport
- Sport: Handball
- Position: Left wing
- Current club: Incheon City
- Number: 7
National team
Years	Team	Apps
–	South Korea	16
Medal record
Asian Games
Gold medal – first place	2018 Jakarta	Team
Silver medal – second place	2022 Hangzhou	Team
Asian Championship
Gold medal – first place	2017 South Korea
Gold medal – first place	2018 Japan
Gold medal – first place	2021 Jordan
Gold medal – first place	2022 South Korea

Shin Eun-joo (Korean: 신은주; born 9 September 1993) is a South Korean handball player for Incheon City and the South Korean national team.

== Career ==
In December 2019 Shin was called up to the South Korean national team and competed in the 2019 IHF World Handball Championship. During the competition she appeared in all eight games as the starting left wing and scored 25 goals, ranked third in Team Korea behind Ryu Eun-hee (69) and Lee Mi-gyeong (40).
