= Song Hye-soo =

South Korean handball player (born 1999)

Personal information
- Nationality: South Korean
- Born: 27 August 1999 (age 27)
- Height: 1.62 m (5 ft 4 in)

Sport
- Sport: Handball
- Position: Centre back
- Current club: Incheon Business H.S
National team
- Years: Team
- –: South Korea
Medal record
Asian Games
Silver medal – second place	2022 Hangzhou	Team
Asian Championship
Gold medal – first place	2021 Jordan
Gold medal – first place	2022 South Korea

Song Hye-soo (Korean: 송혜수, born 27 August 1999) is a South Korean handball player for Incheon Business H.S and the South Korean national team.

She participated at the 2017 World Women's Handball Championship and the 2022 Asian Games.

== International honours ==
- Junior World Championship:
  - Bronze Medalist: 2018

== Awards and recognition ==
- Junior World Championship Most Valuable Player: 2018
