= Jyoti Shukla =

Indian handball player

Personal information
- Nationality: Indian
- Born: 17 July 1996 (age 30) Kakadev, Kanpur, Uttar Pradesh, India
- Occupation: Handball player
- Years active: 2018–present
- Spouse: Udit (m. 28 February 2023)

Sport
- Position: Line player
- Team: India women's national handball team, Uttar Pradesh (domestic)

Jyoti Shukla (born 17 July 1996) is a handball player from Uttar Pradesh. She plays for the India women's National Handball team as a line player. She plays for Uttar Pradesh in the domestic events. She represented India in two Asian Games, Olympic qualification matches and Asian Women's Championships.

== Early life ==
Shukla is from Kakadev, Kanpur, Uttar Pradesh, India. She is the daughter of Shiv Shankar Shukla and Meera Shukla. Her sister Lakshmi Shukla is also a handball player. She married Udit on 28 February 2023. Handball Association of India treasurer Anandeshwar Pandey, Kanpur Olympic Association general secretary Rajat Aditya Dixit and many Indian handball team players attended the marriage and blessed Jyoti and Udit.

== Career ==
In 2024, Shukla played the Women's Handball League.

In August 2023, Shukla was selected to represent India in the Asian championship at Hiroshima, Japan.

Shukla was the captain of the Indian handball team that took part in the 2022 Asian Games held from 23 September to 8 October 2023 in Hangzhou, China. Diksha Kumari of Haryana was her deputy. This is the fifth Asian Games for the Indian women's handball team. They finished third in a tough group behind Japan and China and failed to advance.

In 2018, she was part of the Indian team that played the 2018 Asian Games in Jakarta, Indonesia. In 2018, she also played the Asian Women's Championships in Japan.

== Awards ==
- Shukla received the Rani Laxmibai Award from Uttar Pradesh chief minister Yogi Adityanath for her significant contribution to sports in January 2023.
