= Mika Nagata =

Japanese handball player (born 1994)

Personal information
- Nationality: Japanese
- Born: 28 May 1994 (age 32) Fukui, Japan
- Height: 1.80 m (5 ft 11 in)

Sport
- Sport: Handball
- Position: Pivot
- Current club: Hokkoku Bank
National team
Years	Team	Apps	(Gls)
–	Japan	59	(41)
Medal record
Asian Championship
Silver medal – second place	2022 South Korea
- Updated on 7 November 2023

Mika Nagata (born 28 May 1994) is a Japanese handball player for Hokkoku Bank and the Japanese national team.

She participated at the 2017 World Women's Handball Championship.

At the 2022 Asian Championship, she won silver medals, losing to South Korea in the final.
