= Natsuki Aizawa =

Japanese handball player (born 1999)

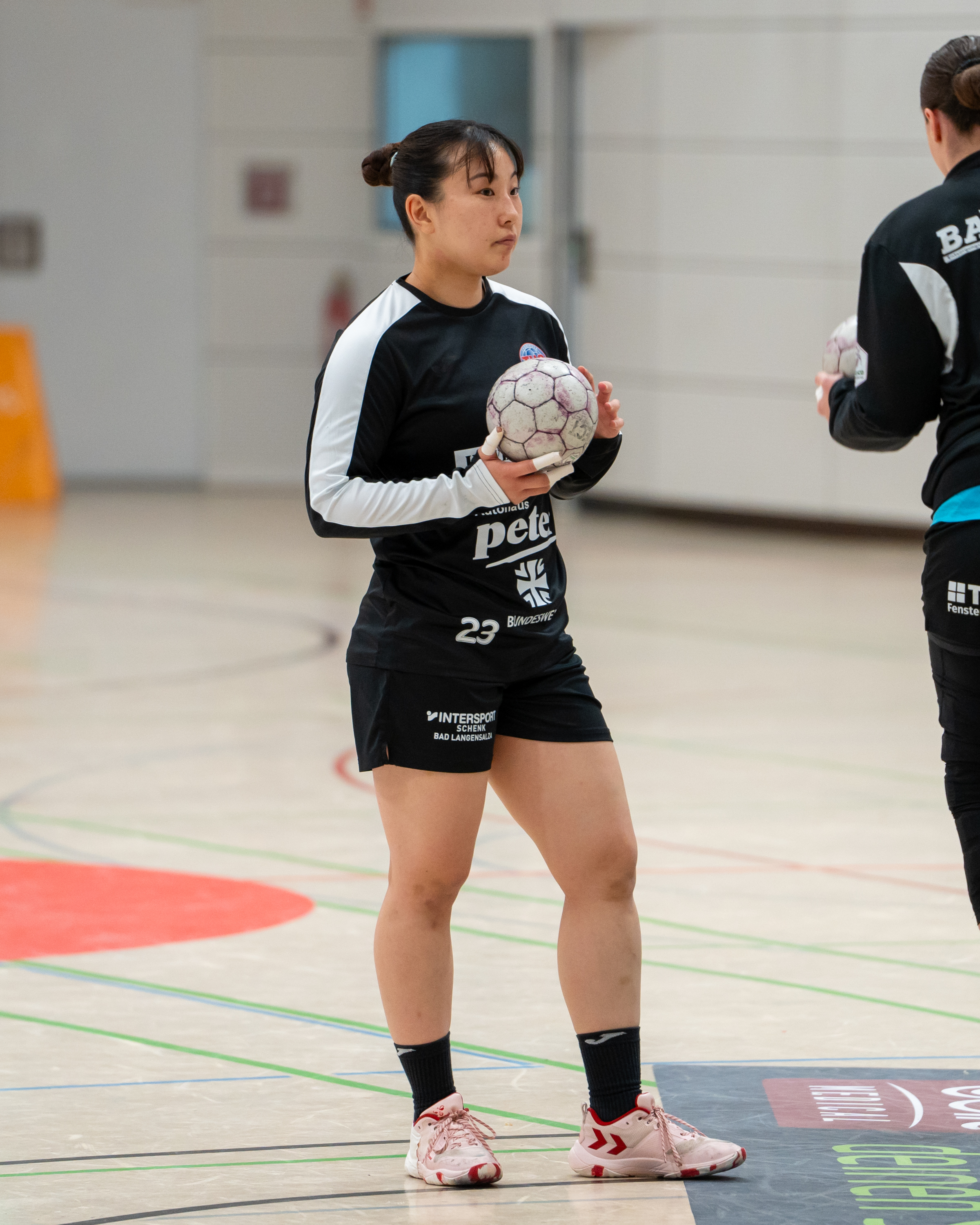
- on the right

Personal information
- Nationality: Japanese
- Born: 6 January 1999 (age 27)
- Height: 1.60 m (5 ft 3 in)

Sport
- Sport: Handball
- Position: Centre back
- Current club: Thüringer HC
- Number: 23

Senior clubs
- Years: Team
- –2024: Hokkoku Bank
- 2024–: Thüringer HC
National team
Years	Team	Apps	(Gls)
2021–	Japan	41	(183)
Medal record
Women's handball
Representing Japan
Asian Games
Gold medal – first place	2022 Hangzhou	Team
Silver medal – second place	2026 Aichi–Nagoya	Team
Asian Championship
Gold medal – first place	2024 India
Silver medal – second place	2022 South Korea
- Updated on 26 October 2025

Natsuki Aizawa (born 6 January 1999) is a Japanese female handball player for the German club Thüringer HC and the Japanese national team.

== Career ==
Aizawa started her career for the Japanese club Hokkoku Bank. In 2024 she joined German team Thüringer HC. Here she won the 2025 European League. This was the first European trophy for the club.

=== National team ===
She represented Japan at the 2021 World Women's Handball Championship in Spain, where Japan finished 11th.

At the 2022 Asian Championship, she won silver medals, losing to South Korea in the final. At this occasion she was chosen for the tournament MVP.

At the 2023 World Championship she was part of the Japanese team that finished 17th. With 30 goals in 6 matches, she was the top scorer for the Japanese national team.

At the 2024 Asian Championship she won gold medals with the Japanese team.

She represented Japan again at the 2025 World Championship.
