= Sevara Rejemetova =

Kazakhstani handball player

Personal information
- Nationality: Kazakhstani
- Born: 1 January 1994 (age 32)
- Height: 1.65 m (5 ft 5 in)

Sport
- Sport: Handball
- Position: Left back
- Current club: Kazygurt Handball
National team
Years	Team	Apps	(Gls)
–	Kazakhstan	47	(142)

Sevara Rejemetova (born 1 January 1994) is a Kazakhstani handball player for Kazygurt Handball and the Kazakhstani national team.

She represented Kazakhstan at the 2019 World Women's Handball Championship.
