= Lin Yanqun =

Chinese handball player (born 1996)

Personal information
- Nationality: Chinese
- Born: 16 May 1996 (age 30)
- Height: 1.77 m (5 ft 10 in)

Sport
- Sport: Handball
- Position: Right back
- Current club: Shandong Handball
National team
Years	Team	Apps	(Gls)
–	China	77	(149)
Medal record
Asian Games
Silver medal – second place	2018 Jakarta	Team
Bronze medal – third place	2022 Hangzhou	Team
Asian Championship
Bronze medal – third place	2022 South Korea

Lin Yanqun (born 16 May 1996) is a Chinese handball player for Shandong Handball and the Chinese national team.

She represented China at the 2019 World Women's Handball Championship in Japan, where the Chinese team placed 23rd.
