= Kang Kyung-min =

South Korean handball player (born 1996)

Personal information
- Nationality: South Korean
- Born: 8 November 1996 (age 29) Incheon, South Korea
- Height: 1.65 m (5 ft 5 in)

Sport
- Sport: Handball
- Position: Centre back
National team
- Years: Team
- –: South Korea
Medal record
Women's handball
Representing South Korea
Asian Games
Silver medal – second place	2022 Hangzhou	Team
Asian Championship
Gold medal – first place	2022 South Korea
Summer Youth Olympics
Gold medal – first place	2014 China	Team

Kang Kyung-min (born 8 November 1996) is a South Korean handball player who represents South Korean national team. She made her Olympic debut representing South Korea at the 2020 Summer Olympics.

== Career ==
She represented South Korea at the 2014 Summer Youth Olympics and was part of the South Korean team which defeated Russia 32–31 in the final to claim the gold medal in the girls handball tournament. She was awarded the Most Valuable Player in Handball Korea League for 2019/20 and 2020/21 season for her consistent performances.

She was included in the South Korean squad in the women's handball competition for the 2020 Summer Olympics, 2022 Asian Games, and 2024 Summer Olympics.
