= Kaho Nakayama (handballer) =

Japanese handball player (born 1998)

Personal information
- Nationality: Japanese
- Born: 23 October 1998 (age 27) Sōja, Japan
- Height: 1.72 m (5 ft 8 in)

Sport
- Sport: Handball
- Position: Right back
- Current club: CSM Slatina

Senior clubs
- Years: Team
- -2024: Hokkoku Bank
- 2024-2026: BSV Sachsen Zwickau
- 2026-: CSM Slatina
National team
Years	Team	Apps	(Gls)
–	Japan	43	(135)
Medal record
Women's handball
Representing Japan
Asian Games
Gold medal – first place	2022 Hangzhou	Team
Silver medal – second place	2026 Aichi–Nagoya	Team
Asian Championship
Gold medal – first place	2024 India
Silver medal – second place	2022 South Korea
- Updated on 26 October 2025

Kaho Nakayama (born 23 October 1998) is a Japanese female handball player player for Romanian handball club CSM Slatina and the Japanese national team.

== Career ==
Nakayama started her career for the Japanese club Hokkoku Bank. In 2024 she joined German team BSV Sachsen Zwickau. For the 2026/27 season, she moved to the Romanian first-division club CSM Slatina.

== National team ==
With the Japan women's national junior handball team she played at the 2018 Women's Junior World Handball Championship and got a 14th place.

She represented Japan at the 2021 World Women's Handball Championship in Spain, where Japan finished 11th.

At the 2022 Asian Championship, she won silver medals, losing to South Korea in the final.

At the 2023 World Championship she was part of the Japanese team that finished 17th. Nakayama scored 20 goals in 6 matches.

At the 2024 Asian Championship she won gold medals with the Japanese team.

She represented Japan again at the 2025 World Championship.
