= Li Xiaoqing =

Chinese handball player (born 1995)

Personal information
- Nationality: Chinese
- Born: 22 December 1995 (age 30)
- Height: 1.76 m (5 ft 9 in)

Sport
- Sport: Handball
- Position: Left back

Senior clubs
- Years: Team
- –: Beijing Army
- –: Guangdong Handball
National team
Years	Team	Apps	(Gls)
–	China	100	(300)
Medal record
Women's handball
Representing China
Asian Games
Silver medal – second place	2018 Jakarta	Team
Bronze medal – third place	2022 Hangzhou	Team
Bronze medal – third place	2026 Aichi–Nagoya	Team
Asian Championship
Bronze medal – third place	2022 South Korea
- Updated on 29 November 2023

Li Xiaoqing (Chinese: 李晓晴, born 22 December 1995) is a Chinese handball player for Beijing Army and the Chinese national team.

She competed at the 2015 World Women's Handball Championship in Denmark, the 2017 World Women's Handball Championship in Germany, and at the 2023 World Women's Handball Championship in Scandinavia.
