= Gim Bo-eun =

South Korean handball player (born 1997)

Personal information
- Nationality: South Korean
- Born: 8 December 1997 (age 28)
- Height: 1.76 m (5 ft 9 in)

Sport
- Sport: Handball
- Position: Pivot
- Current club: Wonderful Samcheok

Senior clubs
- Years: Team
- –: Gyeongnam Development
- –: Wonderful Samcheok
National team
Years	Team	Apps	(Gls)
–	South Korea	18	(28)
Medal record
Women's handball
Representing South Korea
Asian Games
Gold medal – first place	2018 Incheon	Team
Gold medal – first place	2026 Aichi–Nagoya	Team
Silver medal – second place	2022 Hangzhou	Team
Asian Championship
Gold medal – first place	2022 South Korea
Silver medal – second place	2024 India
Summer Youth Olympics
Gold medal – first place	2014 Nanjing	Team
- Updated on 27 November 2025

- Gim Bo-eun
- Hangul: 김보은
- RR: Gim Boeun
- MR: Kim Poŭn

Gim Bo-eun (Korean: 김보은, born 8 December 1997) is a South Korean handball player for Wonderful Samcheok and the South Korean national team. She made her Olympic debut representing South Korea at the 2020 Summer Olympics.

== Career ==
She represented South Korea at the 2014 Summer Youth Olympics and was part of the South Korean team which defeated Russia 32–31 in the final to claim the gold medal in the girls handball tournament.

She was part of the national team which finished at thirteenth position at the 2017 World Women's Handball Championship. She was also a member of the Korean team which won gold medal in the women's team event at the 2018 Asian Games.

She was included in the South Korean squad in the women's handball competition for the 2020 Summer Olympics.

She also represented South Korea at the 2025 World Women's Handball Championship.
