= Saki Hattori =

Japanese handball player (born 1996)

Personal information
- Nationality: Japanese
- Born: 22 December 1996 (age 29) Yokkaichi, Japan
- Height: 1.60 m (5 ft 3 in)

Sport
- Sport: Handball
- Position: Right wing
- Current club: Sony Semiconductor
National team
Years	Team	Apps	(Gls)
–	Japan	18	(80)
Medal record
Asian Games
Gold medal – first place	2022 Hangzhou	Team
Asian Championship
Silver medal – second place	2022 South Korea
- Updated on 7 November 2023

Saki Hattori (Japanese: 服部 沙紀, born 22 December 1996) is a Japanese female handball player for Sony Semiconductor and the Japanese national team.

She represented Japan at the 2021 World Women's Handball Championship in Spain. At the 2022 Asian Championship, she won silver medals, losing to South Korea in the final.
