= Song Ji-young =

South Korean handball player (born 1996)

Personal information
- Nationality: South Korean
- Born: 5 May 1996 (age 30)
- Height: 1.64 m (5 ft 5 in)

Sport
- Sport: Handball
- Position: Right wing
- Current club: SK Sugar Gliders
National team
- Years: Team
- –: South Korea
Medal record
Asian Games
| Silver medal – second place | 2022 Hangzhou | Team |
Asian Championship
| Gold medal – first place | 2021 Jordan |
| Gold medal – first place | 2022 South Korea |

Song Ji-young (Korean: 송지영; born 5 May 1996) is a South Korean handball player for SK Sugar Gliders and the South Korean national team.

She participated at the 2017 World Women's Handball Championship, 2022 Asian Games, and 2024 Summer Olympics.
