= Pooja Kanwar =

Indian handball player

Personal information
- Nationality: Indian
- Born: 15 April 2003 (age 22) Rajasthan, India
- Occupation: Handball player
- Years active: 2023–present

Sport
- Position: Right wing
- Team: India women's national handball team, Rajasthan (domestic)

Pooja Kanwar (born 15 April 2003) is a handball player from Rajasthan. She plays for the India women's national handball team as right wing. She plays for Rajasthan in the domestic events.

== Early life ==
Kanwar is from Rajasthan, India.

== Career ==
In March 2024, Kanwar was the captain of the Rajasthan team which won a silver medal at the 52nd Senior Women’s National Handball Championship at Hathras, Uttar Pradesh. In March 2023, she was also part of the Rajasthan team that won the 51st Senior Women’s National Handball Championship at Varanasi, Uttar Pradesh held under the aegis of Handball Association of India

In 2023, she was part of the Indian women's team at the Asian Games at Hangzhou, the People’s Republic of China. This is the fifth Asian Games for the Indian women's handball team. They finished third in a tough group behind Japan and China and failed to advance.

In February 2023, she was selected to play the AHF President Cup Senior Women's Handball at Amman, Jordan. In November 2023, she also skippered the Rajasthan team which played the 37th National Games at Goa.
