= Zhou Mengxue =

Chinese handball player (born 2000)

Personal information
- Nationality: Chinese
- Born: 20 February 2000 (age 26)
- Height: 1.75 m (5 ft 9 in)

Sport
- Sport: Handball
- Position: Left back
- Current club: Anhui
National team
Years	Team	Apps	(Gls)
–	China	45	(111)
Medal record
Asian Games
Bronze medal – third place	2022 Hangzhou	Team
Asian Championship
Bronze medal – third place	2022 South Korea
- Updated on 29 November 2023

Zhou Mengxue (Chinese: 周梦雪, born 20 February 2000) is a Chinese handball player for Anhui and the Chinese national team.

She participated at the 2017 World Women's Handball Championship and at the 2023 World Women's Handball Championship.
