= India women's national handball team =

National handball team of India

India

Information
- Association: Handball Association of India
- Coach: Ranjit Singh

Colours
1st	2nd	3rd

Results

Asian Championship
- Appearances: 8 (First in 1993)
- Best result: 6th (2000, 2022)
- Last updated on Unknown.

India women's national handball team
Medal record

South Asian Games
Gold medal – first place	2016 India	Team
Gold medal – first place	2019 Nepal	Team

South Asian Championship
Gold medal – first place	1996 Jaipur	
Gold medal – first place	2000 Dhaka	
Gold medal – first place	2008 Lucknow	
Gold medal – first place	2013 Lucknow	
Gold medal – first place	2018 Lucknow	

The Indian women's national handball team is the national team for Handball in India. It is governed by the Handball Association of India.

== Results ==
=== Olympic games ===
Handball at the 2024 Summer Olympics – Asian women's qualification tournament

=== Asian Championship ===
Year	Host	Rank	M	W	D	L	GF	GA	GD
1993	Shantou, China	7th	3	0	0	3	29	126	-97
2000	Shanghai, China	6th	3	0	0	3	32	147	-115
2008	Bangkok, Thailand	8th	5	1	0	4	138	170	-32
2012	Almaty, Kazakhstan	8th	7	2	0	5	195	243	-48
2015	Jakarta, Indonesia	7th	5	1	0	4	92	210	-118
2018	Kumamoto, Japan	8th	6	1	0	5	127	175	-48
2021	Amman, Jordan	Withdrew							
2022	Incheon & Seoul, South Korea	6th	6	3	0	3	181	200	-19
2024	New Delhi, India	6th	5	2	0	3	141	171	-30
2026	Almaty, Kazakhstan	qualified							
Total		8/20	40	10	0	30	935	1442	-507

=== Asian Games ===
No	Year	Host	Rank	M	W	D	L	GF	GA	GD
1	2006	Doha, Qatar	8th	4	0	0	4	80	166	-86
2	2010	Guangzhou, China	8th	4	0	0	4	57	142	-85
3	2014	Incheon, South Korea	8th	5	0	2	3	101	182	-81
4	2018	Jakarta and Palembang, Indonesia	9th	5	1	0	4	131	185	-54
5	2022	Hangzhou, China	5th	4	1	1	2	113	123	-10
Total			5/9	22	2	3	17	482	798	-316

=== South Asian Games ===
No	Year	Host	Position
1	2016	Guwahati, India	1st place, gold medalist(s)
1	2019	Kathmandu & Pokhara, Nepal	1st place, gold medalist(s)

=== South Asian Championship ===
- 1996 – (gold)
- 2000 – (gold)
- 2008 – (gold)
- 2013 – (gold)
- 2018 – (gold)

== 2023 Asian Games squad ==
As of 2023, the Indian team participated in the Asian Games in Group B. Earlier, India played the Asian President's Cup in February 2023 at Jordan. Following is the Asian Games team:

No.	Name	Date of birth	Pos	State
1	Bhawana Sharma	19 May 2003	Centre back	Himachal Pradesh
2	Diksha Kumari	16 March 1999		Uttar Pradesh
3	Monika	22 September 2003	Right back	
4	Priyanka	20 May 2003	Pivot	
5	Sonika	7 December 2001		
6	Sushma	10 October 1999		
7	Pooja Kanwar	15 April 2003	Right wing	Rajasthan
8	Asha Rani	16 September 2002		Haryana
9	Mitali Sharma	10 February 2001		Himachal Pradesh
10	Nidhi Sharma	19 August 1999		Himachal Pradesh
11	Nina Shil	8 January 1998	Goalkeeper	
12	Jyoti Shukla (captain)	17 July 1996	Line player	Uttar Pradesh
13	Shiva Singh	19 September 1997		
14	Tejaswani Singh	4 May 1995		
15	Priyanka Thakur	14 May 2002	Right wing	
16	Shalini Thakur	19 August 2000		

Chief Coach: Sachin Chaudhary; Manager: Paramender Singh.

== 2024 Asian Women's Handball Championship squad ==
The Indian team participated in the 2024 Asian Women's Handball Championship at the Indira Gandhi Indoor Stadium in New Delhi from 3 to 10 December 2024. The Indian women’s handball team was drawn in Group B with Japan, Iran and Hong Kong, China. India finished sixth, and equalled their best ever finish.

No.	Name	Date of birth	Pos	State
1	Diksha Kumari (captain)	16 March 1999	Centre back	Uttar Pradesh
2	Menika	22 September 2003	Centre back	
3	Mamta		Centre back	
4	Bhawana Sharma	19 May 2003	Centre back	Himachal Pradesh
5	Manindar Kaur		Left back	
6	Varsha Jhakhar		Left back	
7	Tejaswani Singh	4 May 1995	Left back	
8	Priyanka Thakur	14 May 2002	Left back	
9	Nikki		Right back	
10	Aarti		Right back	
11	Binapreet Kaur		Right back	
12	Parvesh		Right back	
13	Mitali Sharma	10 February 2001	Pivot	Himachal Pradesh
14	Sujata		Pivot	
15	Sapna Kashyap		Pivot	
16	Pavitra		Pivot	
17	Priyanka	20 May 2003	Left wing	
18	Khushboo Kumari		Right wing	
19	Rimjhim Kumari		Right wing	
20	Gulshan Sharma		Goalkeeper	
21	Nina Shil	8 January 1998	Goalkeeper	
22	Sushma	10 October 1999	Goalkeeper	
23	Shalini Thakur		Goalkeeper	
24	Manika Pal			

Chief Coach: Sachin Chaudhary; Coaches: Karthikeyan M; Manisha Rathore; Snehalatha; Mohd. Tauhid; Physio: Mithali Tiwari.

== Notable former players ==
- Renu Goswami
- Mamta Sodha
- Sachin Chaudhary
- Snehalatha Chaudhary
