= Diksha Kumari =

Indian handball player

Personal information
- Nationality: Indian
- Born: 16 March 1999 (age 26) Kanpur, Uttar Pradesh, India
- Occupation: Handball player
- Years active: 2018–present

Sport
- Position: Right back
- Team: India women's national handball team

Diksha Kumari (born 16 March 1999) is a handball player from Uttar Pradesh. She plays for the India women's national handball team as right back.

== Early life ==
Kumari is from Kanpur, Uttar Pradesh, India. She is a product of the Handball Nursery at Morsinghi in Himachal Pradesh run by former Indian handball players Snehalatha and Sachin Chaudhary. As a player from a Himachal Pradesh academy, she was awarded a cash prize of Rs.3 lakhs by the chief minister of Himachal Pradesh along with other handball players from the state.

== Career ==
Kumari was captain of the senior India women’s team at the 20th the Asian Women’s Handball Championship 2024 at the Indira Gandhi Arena in New Delhi in December 2024. India finished sixth, their best ever result in the Asian event.

In 2023, she was part of the Indian women's team at the Asian Games at Hangzhou, the People’s Republic of China. This is the fifth Asian Games for the Indian women's handball team. They finished third in a tough group behind Japan and China and failed to advance. Earlier, she was part of the Indian team that won the gold at the SAF games.

In 2022, she played the Asian Championship in the Republic of Korea.

She also represented India playing handball at the 2018 Asian Games at Jakarta, Indonesia. India finished 9th.
