= Lu Chang =

Chinese handball player (born 1998)

Personal information
- Nationality: Chinese
- Born: 6 April 1998 (age 28)
- Height: 1.80 m (5 ft 11 in)

Sport
- Sport: Handball
- Position: Goalkeeper
- Current club: Shandong Handball
National team
Years	Team	Apps	(Gls)
2019–	China	44	(0)
Medal record
Women's handball
Representing China
Asian Games
Bronze medal – third place	2022 Hangzhou	Team
Bronze medal – third place	2026 Aichi–Nagoya	Team
Asian Championship
Bronze medal – third place	2022 South Korea
- Updated on 27 November 2025

Lu Chang (Chinese: 路畅, born 6 April 1998) is a Chinese handball player for Shandong Handball and the Chinese national team.

She represented China at the 2019 World Women's Handball Championship in Japan, where the Chinese team placed 23rd. She also represented them at the 2023 World Women's Handball Championship in Scandinavia, where China finished 28th.
