= Japan Handball League =

- Sport: Handball
- Founded: 1976
- Director: Kazumasa Ashihara
- No. of teams: Men's team: 13; Women's team: 11
- Country: Japan
- Confederation: Japan Handball Association
- Most recent champions: Women: Kagawa Bank GiraSol (1st title); Men: Brave Kings Kariya (2nd title) (2025-26)
- Most titles: Women: Kumamoto Beaust Pindys (17 titles); Men: Phenix TOKAI (18 titles)
- Website: https://japanhandballleague.jp

The Japan Handball League (日本ハンドボールリーグ, Nihon Handball Rīgu) (JHL), is the top professional handball league in Japan. Team names and home cities/towns are from the official site for the 46th Japan Handball League (2021/2022 Season). The most recent Champions are Brave Kings Kariya (men) and Kagawa Bank GiraSol (women).

== 2023-2024 JHL Men's Teams ==
Club Name	Home City/Town
Toyota Motor East Japan Regarosso	Ōhira, Miyagi
Osaki Electric Osol	Miyoshi, Saitama
Zeekstar Tokyo	Shinagawa, Tokyo
Earth Friends BM	Ōta, Tokyo
Toyama Dreams	Himi, Toyama
Fukui Eiheiji Blue Thunder	Eiheiji, Fukui
Daido Steel Phenix	Nagoya, Aichi
Toyota Auto Body Brave Kings	Kariya, Aichi
Toyoda Gosei Blue Falcon	Kiyosu, Aichi
Wakunaga Pharmaceutical Leolic	Hiroshima, Hiroshima
Golden Wolves Fukuoka	Ōnojō, Fukuoka
Toyota Boshoku Kyushu Red Tornado	Kanzaki, Saga
Ryukyu Corazon	Urasoe, Okinawa

== 2022-2023 JHL Women's Teams ==
Club Name	Home City/Town
Prestige International Aranmare	Sakata, Yamagata
Hokkoku Bank Honey Bee	Kanazawa, Ishikawa
Hida Takayama Blackbulls Gifu	Takayama, Gifu
HC Nagoya	Nagoya, Aichi
Mie Violet Iris	Suzuka, Mie
Osaka Lovvits	Osaka, Osaka
Izumi Maple Reds	Hiroshima, Hiroshima
Kagawa Bank GiraSol	Takamatsu, Kagawa
Omron Pindys	Yamaga, Kumamoto
Sony Semiconductor Manufacturing Blue Sakuya	Kirishima, Kagoshima
The Terrace Hotels La Tida	Naha, Okinawa
