= Zhejiang Normal University =

University in Jinhua, China

Coordinates: 29.1373°N 119.6410°E

- 浙江师范大学
- Former names: Hangzhou Normal Academy; Hangzhou Normal College; Zhejiang Teaching College; Zhejiang Financial School; Zhejiang School of Preschool-Teacher Education; Jinhua Railway Engineering School
- Type: Public university
- Established: 1956; 70 years ago
- President: Zheng Mengzhuang
- Faculty: 1,288
- Administrative staff: 2,458
- Students: 20,000 undergraduates 2,000 graduates 25,000 adult students
- Undergraduates: 24,800
- Postgraduates: 3,700
- Location: Jinhua, Zhejiang, China
- Campus: Urban area
- Colours
- Website: zjnu.edu.cn

Chinese name
- Simplified Chinese: 浙江师范大学
- Traditional Chinese: 浙江師範大學
Transcriptions
Standard Mandarin
- Hanyu Pinyin: Zhèjiāng Shīfàn Dàxué

Zhejiang Normal University (ZJNU) is a public university in Jinhua city, Zhejiang province, China. Its main campus is next to the Shuanglong Cave national park and covers an area of more than 220 hectares with a total floor space of more than one million square meters.

== History ==
The university was originally established as the Hangzhou Normal Academy in 1956. It became the Hangzhou Normal College in 1958. In 1962, Hangzhou Normal College and the Zhejiang Teaching College merged to become the Zhejiang Normal College. In 1965, the college relocated to Jinhua.

In 1980, the college was classified as a tertiary education. In 1985, the college became the Zheijiang Normal University. Since then, it has expanded its colleges, departments and undergraduate programmes.

In 2000, 2001, and 2004, three more higher education merged into ZJNU: Zhejiang Financial School, Zhejiang School of Preschool-Teacher Education and the Jinhua Railway Engineering School respectively.

== Profile ==
As one of the key provincial universities, ZJNU specializes in teacher education with multiple branches of learning. The university consists of 18 colleges offering 61 undergraduate programs. It has an enrolment over 25,480 undergraduates, 4,300 postgraduates, and 15,000 adult students in adult education programs. Among the total staff of 2,640, there are 1,460 full-time instructors, including a Chinese Academy of Sciences Academician, 260 full professors and 650 associate professors. One professor was awarded the title of National Outstanding Scholar.

The university is named by the Ministry of Education as a Key National Training Base for Teachers of Vocational Education. In addition, it is designated by the Ministry of Railways as a base for the training of locomotive engineers. Moreover, Zhejiang Training Center for University and College Teachers is affiliated to the university for various in-service training programs.

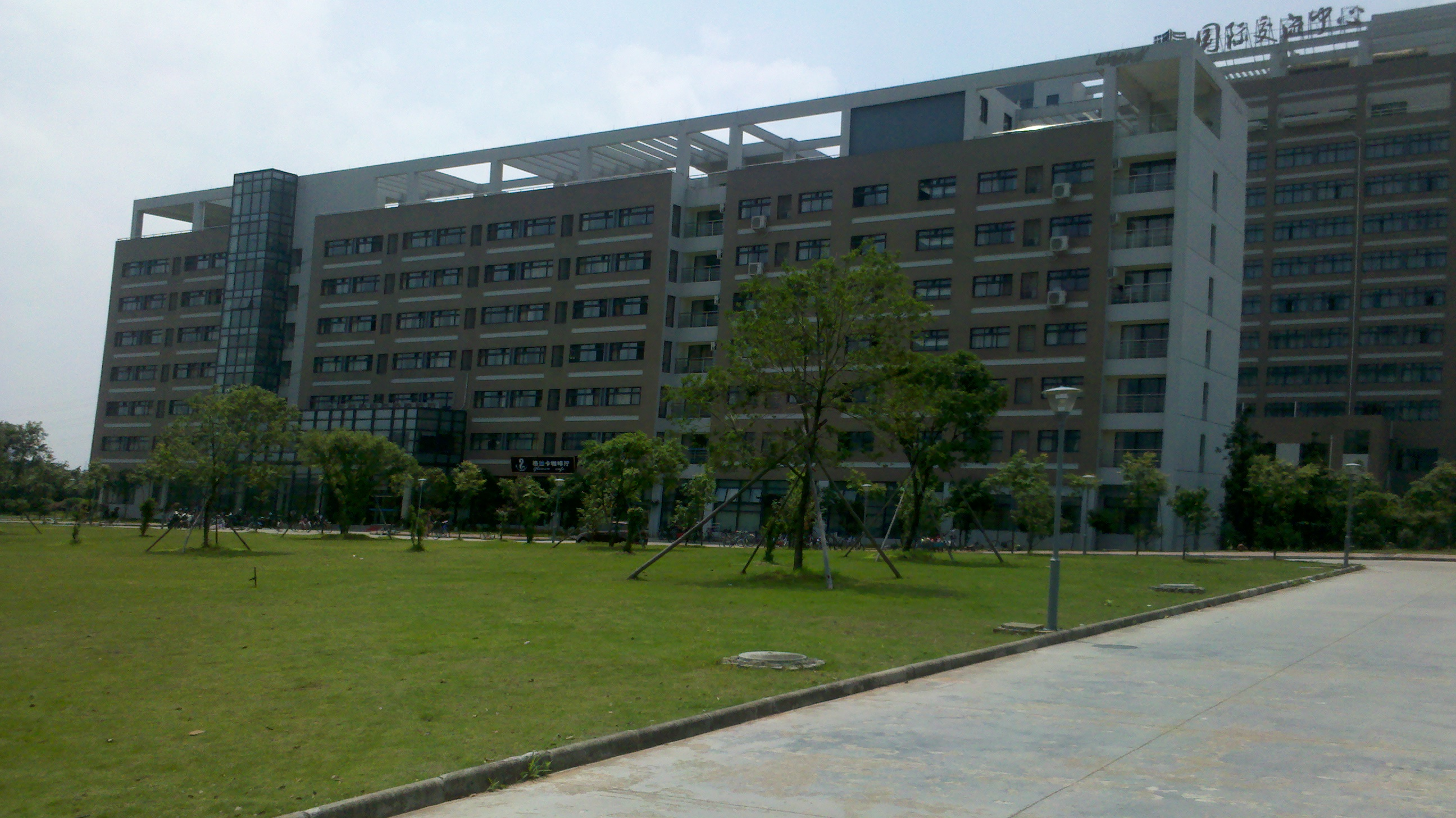
International students new dormitory

At present, the university claims 24 provincial key disciplines, 6 provincial key construction disciplines, 3 provincial research bases and 63 master's degree programs. ZJNU offers other professional master's programs including M.Ed., MPA, MBA, MSW, MTCSOL, MA for Part-Time Vocational Education and MA of Science in Physical Education. The libraries at ZJNU have a collection of more than 3,000,000 traditional books and over 1,850,000 online books. 42 laboratories have been established, with a total floor space of 119,000 square meters, including one key laboratory of the Ministry of Education, one national key demonstration center of experiment instruction and 5 provincial key laboratories and key demonstration centers of experiment instruction.

The university makes strenuous efforts to open up to the outside world. In recent years, ties of academic exchange and cooperation have been set up between ZJNU and 92 foreign universities and research institutes in 42 countries. In 1996, ZJNU set up a Center for Chinese Language and Culture in Cameroon. In 1997, the university was authorized to accept short- and long-term international students.

Approved by the Ministry of Education, ZJNU established a Base for Education Assistance and Development in 2004 to undertake human resources development projects for senior education administrators from other continents. In addition, it has been authorized to run a center for overseas studies to assist self-funded students to study in foreign countries. In 2007, the university was authorized to accept international students supported by the Chinese Government Scholarship and established Confucius Institutes in Cameroon and Ukraine.

Following the motto of "wisdom with virtue, integrity with innovation", ZJNU is striding forward to present itself as a comprehensive teaching and research university with its own characteristics.

== College and schools ==
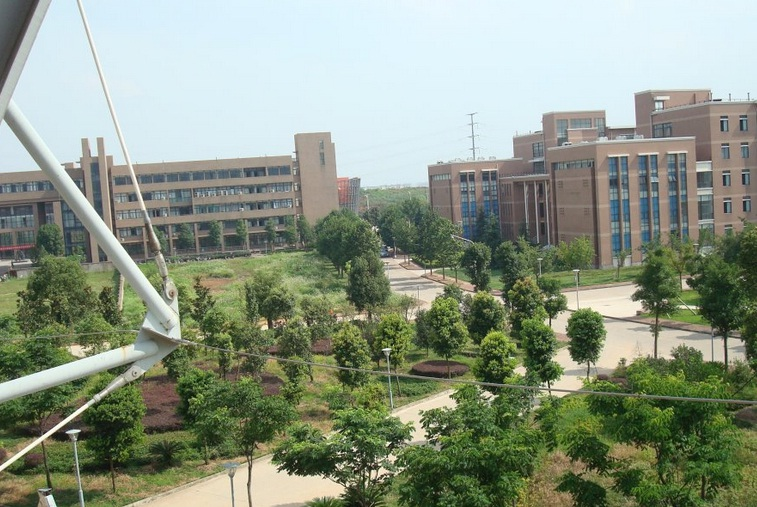
Zhejiang Normal University campus

Zhejiang Normal University has 18 colleges and schools that offers 61 study programs.

- Chuyang Honors College
- Institute of African Studies
- College of Economics and Management
- College of Law and Political Science
- Hangzhou College of Preschool Teacher Education
- College of Physical Education and Health Sciences
- College of Humanities
- College of Foreign Languages
- College of Geography and Environmental Sciences
- College of Engineering
- College of Music
- College of International Culture and Education
- College of Chemistry and Life Sciences
- College of Teacher Education
- College of Fine Arts
- School of Mathematical Sciences
- School of Computer Science and Technology
- College of Physics and Electronic Information
- College of Communication and Creative Culture
- Xingzhi College
- College of Vocational and Technical Education
- Office of Postgraduate Teaching and Student Affairs

The university has a college in Hangzhou: Hangzhou Junior Teachers College.

== Research centers ==
- Research Center for Light-emitting Diodes

== Academics ==
=== Rankings and reputation ===
==== Nature Index ====
Nature Index tracks the affiliations of high-quality scientific articles and presents research outputs by institution and country on monthly basis.

Year	Rank	Valuer
2023	346	Nature Index - Academic Institutions - Global
2023	95	Nature Index - Academic Institutions - China
