= Asha Rani (handballer) =

Indian handball player

Personal information
- Nationality: Indian
- Born: 16 September 2002 (age 23) Danoda Kalan, Jind district, Haryana, India
- Education: Ira International School, Doomarkhan
- Occupation: Handball player
- Years active: 2022–present

Sport
- Position: Right wing
- Team: India women's national handball team, Haryana (domestic)

Asha Rani (born 16 September 2002) is a handball player from Haryana. She plays for the India women's national handball team as right wing. She plays for Haryana in the domestic events.

== Early life ==
Rani is from Danoda Kalan, Narwana Tehsil, Jind district, Haryana, India. She learnt her basics training at Ira International School, Doomarkhan.

== Career ==
Rani was selected along with three others, Rimpa, Sonika and Priyanka, from her village to represent India in the 19th Asian Women's Handball Championship at Incheon city, South Korea from 24 November to 5 December 2022.

In 2023, she was part of the Indian women's team at the Asian Games at Hangzhou, the People’s Republic of China. This is the fifth Asian Games for the Indian women's handball team. They finished third in a tough group behind Japan and China and failed to advance.
