= Ryu Eun-hee =

South Korean handball player (born 1990)

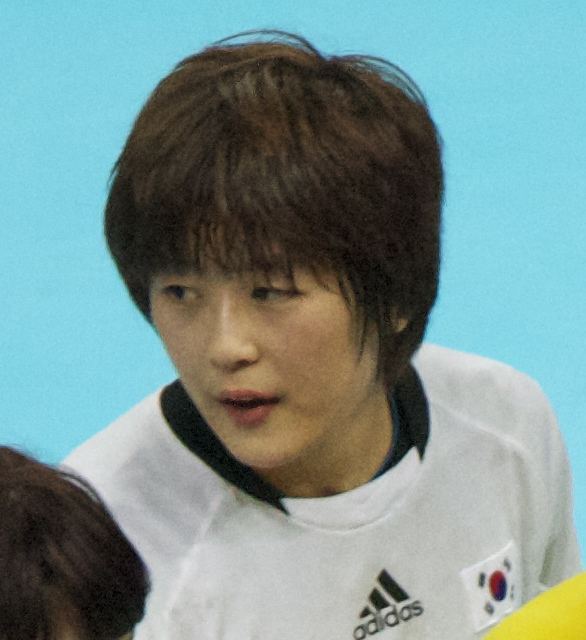
- Ryu in 2012

Personal information
- Nationality: South Korean
- Born: 24 February 1990 (age 36) Incheon, South Korea
- Height: 1.81 m (5 ft 11 in)

Sport
- Sport: Handball
- Position: Right back
- Current club: Busan
- Number: 11

Senior clubs
- Years: Team
- 2010–2015: Incheon
- 2015–2019: Busan
- 2019–2020: Paris 92
- 2020–2021: Busan
- 2021–2025: Győri ETO KC
- 2025–: Busan
National team
Years	Team	Apps	(Gls)
2010–2024	South Korea	171	(524)
Medal record
Women's handball
Representing South Korea
Asian Games
Gold medal – first place	2014 Incheon	Team
Gold medal – first place	2026 Aichi–Nagoya	Team
Silver medal – second place	2022 Hangzhou	Team
Bronze medal – third place	2010 Guangzhou	Team
Asian Championship
Gold medal – first place	2018 Japan
Gold medal – first place	2017 South Korea
Gold medal – first place	2012 Indonesia
Gold medal – first place	2022 South Korea
Silver medal – second place	2010 Kazakhstan
Asian Junior Championship
Gold medal – first place	2007 Kazakhstan
Asian Youth Championship
Gold medal – first place	2007 Taiwan
Gold medal – first place	2005 Thailand

- Ryu Eun-hee
- Hangul: 류은희 (유은희)
- Hanja: 柳殷僖
- Revised Romanization: Ryu (Yu) Eun-hui
- McCune–Reischauer: Ryu (Yu) Ŭnhŭi

Ryu Eun-hee (Korean: 류은희; born 24 February 1990) is a South Korean professional handball player for Busan and the South Korean national team.

== Professional career ==
Ryu played for Busan Infrastructure Corporation in 2019. That year Busan won its first championship title in the SK Handball Korea League. Afterwards she transferred to Paris 92 and played in the French Women's Handball First League.

In November 2020, Ryu returned to Busan Infrastructure Corporation, because she was concerned about rising COVID-19 cases in France.

For the 2021/22 season she transferred to Győri ETO KC. In 2022 and 2023 she won the Hungarian Championship with ETO.

== National team ==
Ryu became the starting right back of the South Korean national team at the 2009 World Handball Championship where South Korea finished in sixth place.

Ryu was named to the team representing South Korea at the Summer Olympics held from 27 July to 12 August 2012 in London, United Kingdom. Ryu finished her first Olympic tournament ranked third overall in goals with 43 goals. Ryu and her team failed to win medals at the 2012 Olympics by losing to Spain 31–29 in double overtime in the bronze medal match.

Ryu competed in the 2016 Summer Olympics held in Rio as well, where South Korea finished in 10th place.

Ryu was named in South Korea's handball team for the 2020 Summer Olympics, where they advanced past the group stage and finished in 8th place overall, the best result for a non-European team.

South Korea qualified for the 2024 Summer Olympics in Paris, where Ryu was again named for the team.

== Achievements ==
- EHF Champions League:
  - Winner: 2024, 2025
