= Hokkoku Bank Handball Team =

Japanese handball club

Hokkoku Bank Handball
- Full name: Hokkoku Bank Handball Ishikawa
- Nickname: The Honey Bees
- Founded: 1975; 51 years ago
- Arena: Hokkoku Sport Center
- Head coach: Tatsuya Kawai
- League: Japan Handball League
- 2025-26: 4th
- Club colours
| Home | Away |

Hokkoku Bank Handball Ishikawa (ハニービー石川) is a Japanese women's handball club based in Kanazawa, Japan. They play their home matches at Hokkoku Bank Sports Center. The team was founded in 1975 and entered the Japan Handball League in 1978.

The club has won the Japanese Championship 13 times.

== Accomplishments ==
- Japan Handball League
  - Winner: 2009, 2010, 2011, 2012, 2015, 2016, 2017, 2018, 2019, 2021, 2022, 2023, 2024
  - Runner-up: 2014, 2024
