= 2022 Asian Women's Handball Championship =

Tournament details
- Host country: South Korea
- Venue(s): 2 (in 2 host cities)
- Dates: 24 November – 4 December

Final positions
- Champions: South Korea (16th title)
- Runner-up: Japan
- Third place: China
- Fourth place: Iran

Tournament statistics
- Matches played: 29
- Goals scored: 1,684 (58.07 per match)

Awards
- Best player: (Japan) Natsuki Aizawa

The 2022 Asian Women's Handball Championship was the 19th edition of the Asian Women's Handball Championship, which took place from 24 November to 4 December 2022 in South Korea. The tournament was held under the aegis of Asian Handball Federation and acted as the Asian qualifying tournament for the 2023 World Women's Handball Championship, with the top five teams qualifying. If countries from Oceania (Australia or New Zealand) participating in the Asian Championships finished in the top 5, they would have qualified for the World Championships. However, as Australia finished in tenth place, the place was transferred to the wild card spot.

South Korea defeated Japan in the final to win their 16th title.

== Draw ==
The draw was held in Bahrain on 27 August 2022.

=== Seeding ===
Pot 1	Pot 2	Pot 3	Pot 4
South Korea; Japan	Iran; Kazakhstan	Uzbekistan; Hong Kong	China; Thailand; India; Australia

== Venues ==
Incheon	Seoul
Namdong Gymnasium; Capacity: 8,830	SK Olympic Handball Gymnasium; Capacity: 6,500
2022 Asian Women's Handball Championship is located in South Korea

== Preliminary round ==
All times are local (UTC+9).

=== Group A ===
Pos	Team	Pld	W	D	L	GF	GA	GD	Pts	Qualification
1	South Korea (H)	4	4	0	0	168	49	+119	8	Semifinals
2	Iran	4	3	0	1	132	123	+9	6	Semifinals
3	India	4	2	0	2	113	133	−20	4	5–8th place semifinals
4	Uzbekistan	4	1	0	3	111	130	−19	2	5–8th place semifinals
5	Australia	4	0	0	4	80	169	−89	0	Ninth place game

Source: AHF
Rules for classification: 1) points; 2) head-to-head points; 3) head-to-head goal difference; 4) head-to-head number of goals scored; 5) goal difference.
(H) Hosts

24 November 2022; 14:00	India	35–43	Iran	Namdong Gymnasium, Incheon; Attendance: 300; Referees: Kawai, Usui (JPN)
24 November 2022; 14:00	Menika 10	(14–24)	four players 6	Namdong Gymnasium, Incheon; Attendance: 300; Referees: Kawai, Usui (JPN)
24 November 2022; 14:00	6× (suspension)	Report	6× (suspension)	Namdong Gymnasium, Incheon; Attendance: 300; Referees: Kawai, Usui (JPN)

24 November 2022; 18:00	Australia	9–48	South Korea	Namdong Gymnasium, Incheon; Attendance: 1,000; Referees: Hideki, Tetsuro (JPN)
24 November 2022; 18:00	Fallah 3	(4–22)	Seo 8	Namdong Gymnasium, Incheon; Attendance: 1,000; Referees: Hideki, Tetsuro (JPN)
24 November 2022; 18:00	6× (suspension) 1× (red card)	Report	1× (suspension)	Namdong Gymnasium, Incheon; Attendance: 1,000; Referees: Hideki, Tetsuro (JPN)

25 November 2022; 14:00	Uzbekistan	32–35	Iran	Namdong Gymnasium, Incheon; Referees: Xu, Liu (CHN)
25 November 2022; 14:00	Obidjonova 12	(16–15)	Merikh 10	Namdong Gymnasium, Incheon; Referees: Xu, Liu (CHN)
25 November 2022; 14:00	1× (yellow card) 8× (suspension)	Report	1× (yellow card) 7× (suspension)	Namdong Gymnasium, Incheon; Referees: Xu, Liu (CHN)

25 November 2022; 18:00	India	8–38	South Korea	Namdong Gymnasium, Incheon; Referees: Al-Wahibi, Al-Shahi (OMA)
25 November 2022; 18:00	Menika, Sonika 3	(4–18)	Seo 8	Namdong Gymnasium, Incheon; Referees: Al-Wahibi, Al-Shahi (OMA)
25 November 2022; 18:00	2× (suspension) 1× (red card)	Report	4× (suspension)	Namdong Gymnasium, Incheon; Referees: Al-Wahibi, Al-Shahi (OMA)

27 November 2022; 12:00	India	28–22	Uzbekistan	Namdong Gymnasium, Incheon; Referees: Mohamed, Al-Aradi (BHR)
27 November 2022; 12:00	Menika 8	(13–7)	Khudoykulova 5	Namdong Gymnasium, Incheon; Referees: Mohamed, Al-Aradi (BHR)
27 November 2022; 12:00	3× (suspension) 1× (red card)	Report	1× (yellow card) 3× (suspension)	Namdong Gymnasium, Incheon; Referees: Mohamed, Al-Aradi (BHR)

27 November 2022; 14:00	Iran	43–15	Australia	Namdong Gymnasium, Incheon; Referees: Nawaf, Al-Naseem (KUW)
27 November 2022; 14:00	Oshaghi 8	(19–9)	C. Wan 4	Namdong Gymnasium, Incheon; Referees: Nawaf, Al-Naseem (KUW)
27 November 2022; 14:00	2× (suspension) 1× (red card)	Report	7× (suspension) 1× (red card)	Namdong Gymnasium, Incheon; Referees: Nawaf, Al-Naseem (KUW)

28 November 2022; 12:00	Australia	30–42	India	Namdong Gymnasium, Incheon; Referees: Faraj, Taqi (KUW)
28 November 2022; 12:00	Buckett 11	(13–22)	Bhawana 16	Namdong Gymnasium, Incheon; Referees: Faraj, Taqi (KUW)
28 November 2022; 12:00	3× (suspension)	Report	6× (suspension)	Namdong Gymnasium, Incheon; Referees: Faraj, Taqi (KUW)

28 November 2022; 18:00	Uzbekistan	21–41	South Korea	Namdong Gymnasium, Incheon; Referees: Xu, Liu (CHN)
28 November 2022; 18:00	Obidjonova, Ruzieva 4	(8–21)	Seo 8	Namdong Gymnasium, Incheon; Referees: Xu, Liu (CHN)
28 November 2022; 18:00	3× (suspension)	Report	1× (yellow card) 6× (suspension)	Namdong Gymnasium, Incheon; Referees: Xu, Liu (CHN)

30 November 2022; 14:00	Australia	26–36	Uzbekistan	Namdong Gymnasium, Incheon; Referees: Ali, Al-Aradi (BHR)
30 November 2022; 14:00	Mouncey 11	(11–19)	Khudoykulova 9	Namdong Gymnasium, Incheon; Referees: Ali, Al-Aradi (BHR)
30 November 2022; 14:00	7× (suspension)	Report	2× (suspension)	Namdong Gymnasium, Incheon; Referees: Ali, Al-Aradi (BHR)

30 November 2022; 18:00	South Korea	41–11	Iran	Namdong Gymnasium, Incheon; Referees: Hideki, Tetsuro (JPN)
30 November 2022; 18:00	Song J. 10	(19–5)	Merikh 5	Namdong Gymnasium, Incheon; Referees: Hideki, Tetsuro (JPN)
30 November 2022; 18:00	4× (suspension)	Report	1× (yellow card) 3× (suspension) 1× (red card)	Namdong Gymnasium, Incheon; Referees: Hideki, Tetsuro (JPN)

=== Group B ===
Pos	Team	Pld	W	D	L	GF	GA	GD	Pts	Qualification
1	Japan	4	4	0	0	148	63	+85	8	Semifinals
2	China	4	3	0	1	126	89	+37	6	Semifinals
3	Kazakhstan	4	2	0	2	105	109	−4	4	5–8th place semifinals
4	Thailand	4	1	0	3	70	130	−60	2	5–8th place semifinals
5	Hong Kong	4	0	0	4	72	130	−58	0	Ninth place game

Source: AHF
Rules for classification: 1) points; 2) head-to-head points; 3) head-to-head goal difference; 4) head-to-head number of goals scored; 5) goal difference.

24 November 2022; 12:00	China	28–26	Kazakhstan	Namdong Gymnasium, Incheon; Attendance: 300; Referees: Nawaf, Al-Naseem (KUW)
24 November 2022; 12:00	Li, Liu C. 7	(12–11)	Khardina 8	Namdong Gymnasium, Incheon; Attendance: 300; Referees: Nawaf, Al-Naseem (KUW)
24 November 2022; 12:00	6× (suspension)	Report	1× (yellow card) 2× (suspension)	Namdong Gymnasium, Incheon; Attendance: 300; Referees: Nawaf, Al-Naseem (KUW)

24 November 2022; 16:00	Thailand	9–44	Japan	Namdong Gymnasium, Incheon; Attendance: 300; Referees: Marzieh, Hassanzadah (IRI)
24 November 2022; 16:00	Sripho 3	(4–16)	Hattori 9	Namdong Gymnasium, Incheon; Attendance: 300; Referees: Marzieh, Hassanzadah (IRI)
24 November 2022; 16:00	2× (suspension)	Report	1× (yellow card) 3× (suspension)	Namdong Gymnasium, Incheon; Attendance: 300; Referees: Marzieh, Hassanzadah (IRI)

25 November 2022; 12:00	Hong Kong	24–28	Kazakhstan	Namdong Gymnasium, Incheon; Referees: Mozafarivanani, Mazaheri (IRI)
25 November 2022; 12:00	Wu 7	(7–9)	Malysheva 5	Namdong Gymnasium, Incheon; Referees: Mozafarivanani, Mazaheri (IRI)
25 November 2022; 12:00	1× (suspension)	Report	3× (suspension)	Namdong Gymnasium, Incheon; Referees: Mozafarivanani, Mazaheri (IRI)

25 November 2022; 16:00	China	26–29	Japan	Namdong Gymnasium, Incheon; Referees: Ismoilov, Ismoilov (UZB)
25 November 2022; 16:00	Jin 7	(16–18)	Hattori 11	Namdong Gymnasium, Incheon; Referees: Ismoilov, Ismoilov (UZB)
25 November 2022; 16:00	4× (suspension)	Report	1× (suspension)	Namdong Gymnasium, Incheon; Referees: Ismoilov, Ismoilov (UZB)

27 November 2022; 16:00	China	36–21	Hong Kong	Namdong Gymnasium, Incheon; Referees: Marzieh, Hassanzadah (IRI)
27 November 2022; 16:00	Zhou 10	(19–6)	Cheung 6	Namdong Gymnasium, Incheon; Referees: Marzieh, Hassanzadah (IRI)
27 November 2022; 16:00	1× (yellow card) 3× (suspension)	Report	1× (yellow card) 3× (suspension) 1× (red card)	Namdong Gymnasium, Incheon; Referees: Marzieh, Hassanzadah (IRI)

27 November 2022; 18:00	Kazakhstan	30–24	Thailand	Namdong Gymnasium, Incheon; Referees: Kim, Kwon (KOR)
27 November 2022; 18:00	Seitkassym 10	(16–14)	Wichaisang 10	Namdong Gymnasium, Incheon; Referees: Kim, Kwon (KOR)
27 November 2022; 18:00	4× (suspension)	Report	3× (suspension)	Namdong Gymnasium, Incheon; Referees: Kim, Kwon (KOR)

28 November 2022; 14:00	Thailand	13–36	China	Namdong Gymnasium, Incheon; Referees: Gheisarian, Gheisarian (IRI)
28 November 2022; 14:00	Sopharak 4	(8–23)	Gong 6	Namdong Gymnasium, Incheon; Referees: Gheisarian, Gheisarian (IRI)
28 November 2022; 14:00	1× (suspension)	Report	1× (suspension)	Namdong Gymnasium, Incheon; Referees: Gheisarian, Gheisarian (IRI)

28 November 2022; 16:00	Hong Kong	7–42	Japan	Namdong Gymnasium, Incheon; Referees: Mozafarivanani, Mazaheri (IRI)
28 November 2022; 16:00	Cheung, Chong 2	(4–25)	Kinjo 9	Namdong Gymnasium, Incheon; Referees: Mozafarivanani, Mazaheri (IRI)
28 November 2022; 16:00	2× (suspension)	Report		Namdong Gymnasium, Incheon; Referees: Mozafarivanani, Mazaheri (IRI)

30 November 2022; 12:00	Thailand	24–20	Hong Kong	Namdong Gymnasium, Incheon; Referees: Kim, Kwon (KOR)
30 November 2022; 12:00	Wichaisang 9	(12–9)	Ip 4	Namdong Gymnasium, Incheon; Referees: Kim, Kwon (KOR)
30 November 2022; 12:00	1× (yellow card) 5× (suspension)	Report	4× (suspension)	Namdong Gymnasium, Incheon; Referees: Kim, Kwon (KOR)

30 November 2022; 16:00	Japan	33–21	Kazakhstan	Namdong Gymnasium, Incheon; Referees: Al-Wahibi, Al-Shahi (OMA)
30 November 2022; 16:00	Aizawa 7	(12–11)	Khardina 5	Namdong Gymnasium, Incheon; Referees: Al-Wahibi, Al-Shahi (OMA)
30 November 2022; 16:00		Report	1× (suspension) 1× (red card)	Namdong Gymnasium, Incheon; Referees: Al-Wahibi, Al-Shahi (OMA)

== Knockout stage ==
=== Ninth place game ===
2 December 2022; 11:00	Australia	26–28	Hong Kong	Namdong Gymnasium, Incheon; Referees: Ismoilov, Ismoilov (UZB)
2 December 2022; 11:00	Buckett 12	(10–14)	Wong K. 7	Namdong Gymnasium, Incheon; Referees: Ismoilov, Ismoilov (UZB)
2 December 2022; 11:00	5× (suspension)	Report	1× (suspension)	Namdong Gymnasium, Incheon; Referees: Ismoilov, Ismoilov (UZB)

=== 5–8th place bracket ===
5–8th place semifinals
2 December
India	37
Thailand	25
2 December
Kazakhstan	30
Uzbekistan	28

Fifth place
3 December
India	31
Kazakhstan	42
Seventh place
3 December
Thailand	39
Uzbekistan	35

==== 5–8th place semifinals ====
2 December 2022; 13:00	India	37–25	Thailand	SK Olympic Handball Gymnasium, Seoul; Referees: Kawai, Usui (JPN)
2 December 2022; 13:00	P. Thakur, S. Thakur 9	(18–16)	Wichaisang 12	SK Olympic Handball Gymnasium, Seoul; Referees: Kawai, Usui (JPN)
2 December 2022; 13:00	4× (suspension)	Report	5× (suspension)	SK Olympic Handball Gymnasium, Seoul; Referees: Kawai, Usui (JPN)

2 December 2022; 15:00	Kazakhstan	30–28	Uzbekistan	SK Olympic Handball Gymnasium, Seoul; Referees: Xu, Liu (CHN)
2 December 2022; 15:00	Khardina 7	(14–12)	Vosiljonova 7	SK Olympic Handball Gymnasium, Seoul; Referees: Xu, Liu (CHN)
2 December 2022; 15:00	1× (suspension) 1× (red card)	Report	1× (yellow card) 3× (suspension)	SK Olympic Handball Gymnasium, Seoul; Referees: Xu, Liu (CHN)

==== Seventh place game ====
3 December 2022; 14:00	Thailand	39–35	Uzbekistan	SK Olympic Handball Gymnasium, Seoul; Referees: Marzieh, Hassanzadah (IRI)
3 December 2022; 14:00	Wichaisang 15	(20–17)	Obidjonova 8	SK Olympic Handball Gymnasium, Seoul; Referees: Marzieh, Hassanzadah (IRI)
3 December 2022; 14:00	2× (suspension)	Report	4× (suspension)	SK Olympic Handball Gymnasium, Seoul; Referees: Marzieh, Hassanzadah (IRI)

==== Fifth place game ====
3 December 2022; 16:00	India	31–42	Kazakhstan	SK Olympic Handball Gymnasium, Seoul; Referees: Hideki, Tetsuro (JPN)
3 December 2022; 16:00	Bhawana 8	(11–18)	Khardina 7	SK Olympic Handball Gymnasium, Seoul; Referees: Hideki, Tetsuro (JPN)
3 December 2022; 16:00	1× (suspension)	Report	1× (suspension)	SK Olympic Handball Gymnasium, Seoul; Referees: Hideki, Tetsuro (JPN)

=== Championship bracket ===
Semi-finals
2 December
Japan	43
Iran	19
2 December
South Korea	34
China	16

Final
4 December
Japan	29
South Korea (ET)	34
Third place
4 December
Iran	24
China	39

==== Semifinals ====
2 December 2022; 17:00	Japan	43–19	Iran	SK Olympic Handball Gymnasium, Seoul; Referees: Nawaf, Al-Naseem (KUW)
2 December 2022; 17:00	Nakayama 6	(21–7)	Merikh 7	SK Olympic Handball Gymnasium, Seoul; Referees: Nawaf, Al-Naseem (KUW)
2 December 2022; 17:00	4× (suspension)	Report	3× (suspension)	SK Olympic Handball Gymnasium, Seoul; Referees: Nawaf, Al-Naseem (KUW)

2 December 2022; 19:00	South Korea	34–16	China	SK Olympic Handball Gymnasium, Seoul; Referees: Al-Shahi, Al-Wahibi (OMA)
2 December 2022; 19:00	three players 6	(16–9)	Li 4	SK Olympic Handball Gymnasium, Seoul; Referees: Al-Shahi, Al-Wahibi (OMA)
2 December 2022; 19:00	1× (yellow card) 1× (suspension)	Report	4× (suspension) 1× (red card)	SK Olympic Handball Gymnasium, Seoul; Referees: Al-Shahi, Al-Wahibi (OMA)

==== Third place game ====
4 December 2022; 14:00	Iran	24–39	China	SK Olympic Handball Gymnasium, Seoul; Attendance: 200; Referees: Ismoilov, Ismoilov (UZB)
4 December 2022; 14:00	Merikh 9	(11–20)	Lin 6	SK Olympic Handball Gymnasium, Seoul; Attendance: 200; Referees: Ismoilov, Ismoilov (UZB)
4 December 2022; 14:00	2× (suspension)	Report	3× (suspension)	SK Olympic Handball Gymnasium, Seoul; Attendance: 200; Referees: Ismoilov, Ismoilov (UZB)

==== Final ====
4 December 2022
16:00
Japan
29–34 (ET)
South Korea
SK Olympic Handball Gymnasium, Seoul
Attendance: 1,000
Referees: Gheisarian, Gheisarian (IRI)
Sasaki 7
(16–10)
Ryu 19
4× (suspension)
Report
5× (suspension)

FT: 27–27 ET: 2–7

== Final standing ==
Rank	Team
1st place, gold medalist(s)	South Korea
2nd place, silver medalist(s)	Japan
3rd place, bronze medalist(s)	China
4	Iran
5	Kazakhstan
6	India
7	Thailand
8	Uzbekistan
9	Hong Kong
10	Australia

Qualified for the 2023 World Women's Handball Championship

=== All-Star team ===
Position	Player
Goalkeeper	(China) Lu Chang
Right wing	(South Korea) Song Ji-young
Right back	(South Korea) Ryu Eun-hee
Centre back	(South Korea) Song Hye-soo
Left back	(Kazakhstan) Veronika Khardina
Left wing	(Iran) Hadiseh Norouzi
Pivot	(Japan) Mika Nagata
Most valuable player	(Japan) Natsuki Aizawa
