= 2018 World University Handball Championship =

Tournament details
- Host country: Croatia
- Venue: 1 (in 1 host city)
- Dates: 30 July – 5 August
- Teams: 10 (men); 9 (women)

The 2018 World University Handball Championship was the 24th edition of this Handball event organized by the FISU. It was held in Rijeka, Croatia at the Zamet Hall, from 30 July to 5 August.

== Participating teams ==
Men

- Croatia
- Portugal
- Lithuania
- Czech Republic
- Romania
- Poland
- Egypt
- South Korea
- Japan
- Chinese Taipei

Women

- Czech Republic
- Croatia
- Romania
- Spain
- Poland
- Brazil
- Uruguay
- Japan
- South Korea

== Medal summary ==
Event	Gold	Silver	Bronze
Men's tournament	South Korea	Croatia	Japan
Women's tournament	Japan	Brazil	South Korea

== Men's tournament ==
All times are local (UTC+2).

=== Group stage ===
==== Group A ====
Pos	Team	Pld	W	D	L	GF	GA	GD	Pts	Qualification
1	Portugal	4	2	1	1	103	105	−2	5 (Note: Portugal 3 Pts; Croatia 2 Pts; Egypt 1 Pt.)	Semifinals
2	Croatia	4	1	3	0	108	101	+7	5	Semifinals
3	Egypt	4	2	1	1	115	109	+6	5	5–8th place semifinals
4	Czech Republic	4	1	1	2	103	104	−1	3	5–8th place semifinals
5	Lithuania	4	1	0	3	101	111	−10	2	

Source: Rijeka 2018
Rules for classification: 1) points; 2) head-to-head points; 3) head-to-head goal difference; 4) head-to-head number of goals scored; 5) goal difference.
Notes:

30 July 2018; 12:00	Lithuania	32–25	Czech Republic	Zamet Hall, Rijeka
30 July 2018; 12:00	Grigas 13	(14–15)	Gřešek, Šafránek 5	Zamet Hall, Rijeka
30 July 2018; 12:00		Report		Zamet Hall, Rijeka

30 July 2018; 14:00	Croatia	33–33	Egypt	Zamet Hall, Rijeka
30 July 2018; 14:00	Ćavar 7	(19–17)	Mohsen 8	Zamet Hall, Rijeka
30 July 2018; 14:00		Report		Zamet Hall, Rijeka

31 July 2018; 16:00	Egypt	28–30	Portugal	Zamet Hall, Rijeka
31 July 2018; 16:00	Mrawan 7	(12–17)	Coelho 11	Zamet Hall, Rijeka
31 July 2018; 16:00		Report		Zamet Hall, Rijeka

31 July 2018; 18:00	Czech Republic	25–25	Croatia	Zamet Hall, Rijeka
31 July 2018; 18:00	Bukovský 5	(13–14)	Ćavar 10	Zamet Hall, Rijeka
31 July 2018; 18:00		Report		Zamet Hall, Rijeka

1 August 2018; 16:00	Egypt	25–24	Czech Republic	Zamet Hall, Rijeka
1 August 2018; 16:00	Hazem, Mohsen 6	(11–13)	Fulnek 6	Zamet Hall, Rijeka
1 August 2018; 16:00		Report		Zamet Hall, Rijeka

1 August 2018; 18:00	Portugal	29–26	Lithuania	Zamet Hall, Rijeka
1 August 2018; 18:00	Carvalho 8	(14–14)	Grigas 8	Zamet Hall, Rijeka
1 August 2018; 18:00		Report		Zamet Hall, Rijeka

2 August 2018; 16:00	Portugal	22–29	Czech Republic	Zamet Hall, Rijeka
2 August 2018; 16:00	Coelho 10	(8–14)	Bukovský 6	Zamet Hall, Rijeka
2 August 2018; 16:00		Report		Zamet Hall, Rijeka

2 August 2018; 18:00	Lithuania	21–28	Croatia	Zamet Hall, Rijeka
2 August 2018; 18:00	Simonavičius 7	(8–17)	Ćavar, Moslavac 5	Zamet Hall, Rijeka
2 August 2018; 18:00		Report		Zamet Hall, Rijeka

3 August 2018; 16:00	Lithuania	22–29	Egypt	Zamet Hall, Rijeka
3 August 2018; 16:00	Grigas 5	(11–12)	Hazem 6	Zamet Hall, Rijeka
3 August 2018; 16:00		Report		Zamet Hall, Rijeka

3 August 2018; 18:00	Croatia	22–22	Portugal	Zamet Hall, Rijeka
3 August 2018; 18:00	Ćavar 8	(10–12)	Carvalho 9	Zamet Hall, Rijeka
3 August 2018; 18:00		Report		Zamet Hall, Rijeka

==== Group B ====
Pos	Team	Pld	W	D	L	GF	GA	GD	Pts	Qualification
1	Japan	4	3	0	1	117	102	+15	6 (Note: Japan 2 Pts, +2 GD, 54 GF; South Korea 2 Pts, +2 GD, 51 GF; Romania 2 Pts, –4 GD.)	Semifinals
2	South Korea	4	3	0	1	123	105	+18	6	Semifinals
3	Romania	4	3	0	1	119	102	+17	6	5–8th place semifinals
4	Poland	4	1	0	3	106	112	−6	2	5–8th place semifinals
5	Chinese Taipei	4	0	0	4	104	148	−44	0	

Source: Rijeka 2018
Rules for classification: 1) points; 2) head-to-head points; 3) head-to-head goal difference; 4) head-to-head number of goals scored; 5) goal difference.
Notes:

30 July 2018; 08:00	Romania	28–20	Poland	Zamet Hall, Rijeka
30 July 2018; 08:00	Rotaru 11	(15–10)	Krępa, Ossowski 5	Zamet Hall, Rijeka
30 July 2018; 08:00		Report		Zamet Hall, Rijeka

30 July 2018; 10:00	South Korea	42–30	Chinese Taipei	Zamet Hall, Rijeka
30 July 2018; 10:00	Park K. 7	Report	Lin 7	Zamet Hall, Rijeka

31 July 2018; 14:00	Chinese Taipei	25–29	Japan	Zamet Hall, Rijeka
31 July 2018; 14:00	Wu 7	(12–16)	Kawashima 6	Zamet Hall, Rijeka
31 July 2018; 14:00		Report		Zamet Hall, Rijeka

31 July 2018; 14:00	Poland	26–30	South Korea	Zamet Hall, Rijeka
31 July 2018; 14:00	Ossowski 8	(13–16)	Park K. 10	Zamet Hall, Rijeka
31 July 2018; 14:00		Report		Zamet Hall, Rijeka

1 August 2018; 12:00	Chinese Taipei	25–30	Poland	Zamet Hall, Rijeka
1 August 2018; 12:00	Pan 7	(6–17)	Kamyszek 8	Zamet Hall, Rijeka
1 August 2018; 12:00		Report		Zamet Hall, Rijeka

1 August 2018; 14:00	Japan	25–29	Romania	Zamet Hall, Rijeka
1 August 2018; 14:00	Asumi 5	(10–15)	Rotaru 15	Zamet Hall, Rijeka
1 August 2018; 14:00		Report		Zamet Hall, Rijeka

2 August 2018; 14:00	Japan	34–25	Poland	Zamet Hall, Rijeka
2 August 2018; 14:00	three players 6	(17–15)	Krupa, Lemaniak 5	Zamet Hall, Rijeka
2 August 2018; 14:00		Report		Zamet Hall, Rijeka

2 August 2018; 14:00	Romania	20–28	South Korea	Zamet Hall, Rijeka
2 August 2018; 14:00	Rotaru 6	(9–15)	Park K. 5	Zamet Hall, Rijeka
2 August 2018; 14:00		Report		Zamet Hall, Rijeka

3 August 2018; 12:00	Romania	42–29	Chinese Taipei	Zamet Hall, Rijeka
3 August 2018; 12:00	Rotaru 12	(19–15)	Wu 7	Zamet Hall, Rijeka
3 August 2018; 12:00		Report		Zamet Hall, Rijeka

3 August 2018; 14:00	South Korea	23–29	Japan	Zamet Hall, Rijeka
3 August 2018; 14:00	Kang, Park K. 6	(12–16)	Goto 6	Zamet Hall, Rijeka
3 August 2018; 14:00		Report		Zamet Hall, Rijeka

=== Ninth place play-off ===
4 August 2018; 10:00	Lithuania	39–38	Chinese Taipei	Zamet Hall, Rijeka
4 August 2018; 10:00	Grigas 10	(17–19)	three players 7	Zamet Hall, Rijeka
4 August 2018; 10:00		Report		Zamet Hall, Rijeka

5 August 2018; 09:00	Chinese Taipei	35–43	Lithuania	Zamet Hall, Rijeka
5 August 2018; 09:00	Lin 10	(18–22)	Bučinskas 10	Zamet Hall, Rijeka
5 August 2018; 09:00		Report		Zamet Hall, Rijeka

Lithuania won 82–73 on aggregate.

=== Fifth to eighth place classification ===
5–8th place semifinals
4 August
Czech Republic	25
Romania	22
4 August
Egypt	33
Poland	23

5th place
5 August
Czech Republic	25
Egypt	34
7th place
5 August
Romania	28
Poland	21

==== 5–8th place semifinals ====
4 August 2018; 12:00	Czech Republic	25–22	Romania	Zamet Hall, Rijeka
4 August 2018; 12:00	Gřešek 6	(13–15)	Rotaru 7	Zamet Hall, Rijeka
4 August 2018; 12:00		Report		Zamet Hall, Rijeka

4 August 2018; 14:00	Egypt	33–23	Poland	Zamet Hall, Rijeka
4 August 2018; 14:00		(17–11)	Kamyszek, Krupa 5	Zamet Hall, Rijeka
4 August 2018; 14:00		Report		Zamet Hall, Rijeka

==== Seventh place game ====
5 August 2018; 11:00	Romania	28–21	Poland	Zamet Hall, Rijeka
5 August 2018; 11:00	Rotaru 6	(16–9)	Lemaniak 5	Zamet Hall, Rijeka
5 August 2018; 11:00		Report		Zamet Hall, Rijeka

==== Fifth place game ====
5 August 2018; 13:00	Czech Republic	28–34	Egypt	Zamet Hall, Rijeka
5 August 2018; 13:00	Bukovský, Hanuš 5	(13–19)		Zamet Hall, Rijeka
5 August 2018; 13:00		Report		Zamet Hall, Rijeka

=== First to fourth place classification ===
Semifinals
4 August
Croatia	28
Japan	27
4 August
Portugal	26
South Korea	37

Final
5 August
Croatia	31
South Korea	36
Third place
5 August
Japan	29
Portugal	24

==== Semifinals ====
4 August 2018; 16:00	Croatia	28–27	Japan	Zamet Hall, Rijeka
4 August 2018; 16:00	Pehar 8	(18–14)	Makino 7	Zamet Hall, Rijeka
4 August 2018; 16:00		Report		Zamet Hall, Rijeka

4 August 2018; 18:00	Portugal	26–37	South Korea	Zamet Hall, Rijeka
4 August 2018; 18:00	Areias, Carvalho 5	(8–19)	Park K. 10	Zamet Hall, Rijeka
4 August 2018; 18:00		Report		Zamet Hall, Rijeka

==== Third place game ====
5 August 2018; 15:00	Japan	29–24	Portugal	Zamet Hall, Rijeka
5 August 2018; 15:00	Goto 8	(20–12)	Carvalho 8	Zamet Hall, Rijeka
5 August 2018; 15:00		Report		Zamet Hall, Rijeka

==== Final ====
5 August 2018; 19:00	Croatia	31–36	South Korea	Zamet Hall, Rijeka
5 August 2018; 19:00	Majić 8	(16–20)	Kang, Park K. 8	Zamet Hall, Rijeka
5 August 2018; 19:00		Report		Zamet Hall, Rijeka

=== Final standing ===
Rank	Team
1st place, gold medalist(s)	South Korea
2nd place, silver medalist(s)	Croatia
3rd place, bronze medalist(s)	Japan
4	Portugal
5	Czech Republic
6	Egypt
7	Romania
8	Poland
9	Lithuania
10	Chinese Taipei

=== Top scorers ===
Rank	Player	Goals
1	(Romania) Adrian Rotaru	57
2	(Lithuania) Ignas Grigas	48
3	(South Korea) Park Kwang-soon	46
4	(Portugal) Luís Carvalho	37
4	(Croatia) Davor Ćavar	37

== Women's tournament ==
=== Group stage ===
==== Group A ====
Pos	Team	Pld	W	D	L	GF	GA	GD	Pts	Qualification
1	Brazil	3	2	1	0	75	69	+6	5	Semifinals
2	Japan	3	2	0	1	84	69	+15	4	Semifinals
3	Czech Republic	3	1	0	2	79	77	+2	2	Classification round
4	Croatia (H)	3	0	1	2	53	76	−23	1	Classification round

Source: Rijeka 2018
Rules for classification: 1) points; 2) head-to-head points; 3) head-to-head goal difference; 4) head-to-head number of goals scored; 5) goal difference.
(H) Hosts

30 July 2018; 08:00	Croatia	17–31	Japan	Zamet Hall, Rijeka
30 July 2018; 08:00	Prkačin 6	(8–15)	Hatsumi 6	Zamet Hall, Rijeka
30 July 2018; 08:00		Report		Zamet Hall, Rijeka

30 July 2018; 10:00	Czech Republic	28–29	Brazil	Zamet Hall, Rijeka
30 July 2018; 10:00	Galušková 11	(14–15)	F. Carneiro 6	Zamet Hall, Rijeka
30 July 2018; 10:00		Report		Zamet Hall, Rijeka

1 August 2018; 12:00	Japan	29–23	Czech Republic	Zamet Hall, Rijeka
1 August 2018; 12:00	Kondo 10	(15–13)	Pokorná 7	Zamet Hall, Rijeka
1 August 2018; 12:00		Report		Zamet Hall, Rijeka

1 August 2018; 18:00	Brazil	17–17	Croatia	Zamet Hall, Rijeka
1 August 2018; 18:00	Abreu, Luz 3	(5–13)	three players 3	Zamet Hall, Rijeka
1 August 2018; 18:00		Report		Zamet Hall, Rijeka

3 August 2018; 12:00	Brazil	29–24	Japan	Zamet Hall, Rijeka
3 August 2018; 12:00	Morcineck 8	(14–11)	Kondo 5	Zamet Hall, Rijeka
3 August 2018; 12:00		Report		Zamet Hall, Rijeka

3 August 2018; 18:00	Croatia	19–28	Czech Republic	Zamet Hall, Rijeka
3 August 2018; 18:00	Jelenović 5	(9–13)	Galušková 9	Zamet Hall, Rijeka
3 August 2018; 18:00		Report		Zamet Hall, Rijeka

==== Group B ====
Pos	Team	Pld	W	D	L	GF	GA	GD	Pts	Qualification
1	South Korea	4	4	0	0	122	89	+33	8	Semifinals
2	Poland	4	2	0	2	142	94	+48	4 (Note: Poland 2 Pts, +11 GD; Romania 2 Pts, –2 GD; Spain 2 Pts, –9 GD.)	Semifinals
3	Romania	4	2	0	2	102	91	+11	4	Classification round
4	Spain	4	2	0	2	110	92	+18	4	Classification round
5	Uruguay	4	0	0	4	43	153	−110	0	Classification round

Source: Rijeka 2018
Rules for classification: 1) points; 2) head-to-head points; 3) head-to-head goal difference; 4) head-to-head number of goals scored; 5) goal difference.
Notes:

30 July 2018; 12:00	Spain	37–8	Uruguay	Zamet Hall, Rijeka
30 July 2018; 12:00	Pérez 7	(20–5)	Tito 3	Zamet Hall, Rijeka
30 July 2018; 12:00		Report		Zamet Hall, Rijeka

30 July 2018; 14:00	Romania	28–27	Poland	Zamet Hall, Rijeka
30 July 2018; 14:00	Gavrilă 7	(13–16)	Nosek, Zawistowska 6	Zamet Hall, Rijeka
30 July 2018; 14:00		Report		Zamet Hall, Rijeka

31 July 2018; 16:00	Poland	31–32	South Korea	Zamet Hall, Rijeka
31 July 2018; 16:00	Rosiak 9	(14–17)	Kim D. 13	Zamet Hall, Rijeka
31 July 2018; 16:00		Report		Zamet Hall, Rijeka

31 July 2018; 18:00	Uruguay	10–29	Romania	Zamet Hall, Rijeka
31 July 2018; 18:00	Justo 3	(3–12)	Văcariu 8	Zamet Hall, Rijeka
31 July 2018; 18:00		Report		Zamet Hall, Rijeka

1 August 2018; 14:00	South Korea	24–22	Spain	Zamet Hall, Rijeka
1 August 2018; 14:00	Kim D. 9	(10–11)	Arrojeria 5	Zamet Hall, Rijeka
1 August 2018; 14:00		Report		Zamet Hall, Rijeka

1 August 2018; 16:00	Poland	48–10	Uruguay	Zamet Hall, Rijeka
1 August 2018; 16:00	Zawistowska 10	(24–5)	Aicardi 3	Zamet Hall, Rijeka
1 August 2018; 16:00		Report		Zamet Hall, Rijeka

2 August 2018; 16:00	South Korea	39–15	Uruguay	Zamet Hall, Rijeka
2 August 2018; 16:00	Chung 9	(19–6)	Aicardi 5	Zamet Hall, Rijeka
2 August 2018; 16:00		Report		Zamet Hall, Rijeka

2 August 2018; 18:00	Spain	27–24	Romania	Zamet Hall, Rijeka
2 August 2018; 18:00	Hernández 6	(14–11)	Polocoșer 7	Zamet Hall, Rijeka
2 August 2018; 18:00		Report		Zamet Hall, Rijeka

3 August 2018; 14:00	Spain	24–36	Poland	Zamet Hall, Rijeka
3 August 2018; 14:00	Valdivia 6	(11–14)	Rosiak 8	Zamet Hall, Rijeka
3 August 2018; 14:00		Report		Zamet Hall, Rijeka

3 August 2018; 16:00	Romania	21–27	South Korea	Zamet Hall, Rijeka
3 August 2018; 16:00	Polocoșer 6	(9–16)	Kim D. 7	Zamet Hall, Rijeka
3 August 2018; 16:00		Report		Zamet Hall, Rijeka

=== Classification round ===
Pos	Team	Pld	W	D	L	GF	GA	GD	Pts
5	Spain	3	3	0	0	94	56	+38	6
6	Czech Republic	3	2	0	1	74	66	+8	4 (Note: Czech Republic 22–17 Romania)
7	Romania	4	2	0	2	99	72	+27	4
8	Croatia (H)	3	1	0	2	71	74	−3	2
9	Uruguay	3	0	0	3	35	105	−70	0

Source: Rijeka 2018
Rules for classification: 1) points; 2) head-to-head points; 3) head-to-head goal difference; 4) head-to-head number of goals scored; 5) goal difference.
(H) Hosts
Notes:

4 August 2018; 12:00	Spain	30–24	Czech Republic	Zamet Hall, Rijeka
4 August 2018; 12:00	Pérez 7	(18–8)	three players 4	Zamet Hall, Rijeka
4 August 2018; 12:00		Report		Zamet Hall, Rijeka

4 August 2018; 14:00	Romania	29–13	Croatia	Zamet Hall, Rijeka
4 August 2018; 14:00	Polocoșer 6	(13–6)	Jelenović 7	Zamet Hall, Rijeka
4 August 2018; 14:00		Report		Zamet Hall, Rijeka

5 August 2018; 09:00	Romania	17–22	Czech Republic	Zamet Hall, Rijeka
5 August 2018; 09:00	Polocoșer 5	(10–9)	Pokorná 6	Zamet Hall, Rijeka
5 August 2018; 09:00		Report		Zamet Hall, Rijeka

5 August 2018; 11:00	Uruguay	17–39	Croatia	Zamet Hall, Rijeka
5 August 2018; 11:00	Pérez 4	(5–20)	Jelenović 11	Zamet Hall, Rijeka
5 August 2018; 11:00		Report		Zamet Hall, Rijeka

=== First to fourth place classification ===
Semifinals
4 August
Japan	28
South Korea	21
4 August
Brazil	29
Poland	27

Final
5 August
Japan	27
Brazil	19
Third place
5 August
South Korea	22
Poland	19

==== Semifinals ====
4 August 2018; 16:00	Japan	28–21	South Korea	Zamet Hall, Rijeka
4 August 2018; 16:00	Hattori 10	(16–12)	Kim D. 8	Zamet Hall, Rijeka
4 August 2018; 16:00		Report		Zamet Hall, Rijeka

5 August 2018; 18:00	Brazil	29–27	Poland	Zamet Hall, Rijeka
5 August 2018; 18:00	T. Carneiro 6	(12–17)	Rosiak 6	Zamet Hall, Rijeka
5 August 2018; 18:00		Report		Zamet Hall, Rijeka

==== Third place game ====
5 August 2018; 13:00	South Korea	22–19	Poland	Zamet Hall, Rijeka
5 August 2018; 13:00	Kim D. 11	(11–11)	Szarawaga, Zawistowska 3	Zamet Hall, Rijeka
5 August 2018; 13:00		Report		Zamet Hall, Rijeka

==== Final ====
5 August 2018; 17:00	Japan	27–19	Brazil	Zamet Hall, Rijeka
5 August 2018; 17:00	Nakayama 8	(10–11)	F. Carneiro 5	Zamet Hall, Rijeka
5 August 2018; 17:00		Report		Zamet Hall, Rijeka

=== Final standing ===
Rank	Team
1st place, gold medalist(s)	Japan
2nd place, silver medalist(s)	Brazil
3rd place, bronze medalist(s)	South Korea
4	Poland
5	Spain
6	Czech Republic
7	Romania
8	Croatia
9	Uruguay

=== Top scorers ===
Rank	Player	Goals
1	(South Korea) Kim Da-young	48
2	(Poland) Aleksandra Rosiak	31
3	(Japan) Maharu Kondo	30
4	(Czech Republic) Veronika Galušková	29
4	(Poland) Daria Zawistowska	29
