= 2018 Women's World University Handball Championship =

Tournament details
- Host country: Croatia
- Venue: 1 (in 1 host city)
- Dates: 30 July – 5 August
- Teams: 9

Final positions
- Champions: Japan (1st title)
- Runners-up: Brazil
- Third place: South Korea
- Fourth place: Poland

Tournament statistics
- Matches played: 24
- Goals scored: 1,375 (57.29 per match)
- Top scorer: (South Korea) Kim Da-young (48)

The 2018 Women's World University Handball Championship was the 12th edition of this Handball event organized by the FISU. It was held in Rijeka, Croatia at the Zamet Hall, from 30 July to 5 August.

== Participating teams ==
- Czech Republic
- Croatia
- Romania
- Spain
- Poland
- Brazil
- Uruguay
- Japan
- South Korea

== Group stage ==
=== Group A ===
Pos	Team	Pld	W	D	L	GF	GA	GD	Pts	Qualification
1	Brazil	3	2	1	0	75	69	+6	5	Semifinals
2	Japan	3	2	0	1	84	69	+15	4	Semifinals
3	Czech Republic	3	1	0	2	79	77	+2	2	Classification round
4	Croatia (H)	3	0	1	2	53	76	−23	1	Classification round

Source: Rijeka 2018
Rules for classification: 1) points; 2) head-to-head points; 3) head-to-head goal difference; 4) head-to-head number of goals scored; 5) goal difference.
(H) Hosts

30 July 2018; 08:00	Croatia	17–31	Japan	Zamet Hall, Rijeka
30 July 2018; 08:00	Prkačin 6	(8–15)	Hatsumi 6	Zamet Hall, Rijeka
30 July 2018; 08:00		Report		Zamet Hall, Rijeka

30 July 2018; 10:00	Czech Republic	28–29	Brazil	Zamet Hall, Rijeka
30 July 2018; 10:00	Galušková 11	(14–15)	F. Carneiro 6	Zamet Hall, Rijeka
30 July 2018; 10:00		Report		Zamet Hall, Rijeka

1 August 2018; 12:00	Japan	29–23	Czech Republic	Zamet Hall, Rijeka
1 August 2018; 12:00	Kondo 10	(15–13)	Pokorná 7	Zamet Hall, Rijeka
1 August 2018; 12:00		Report		Zamet Hall, Rijeka

1 August 2018; 18:00	Brazil	17–17	Croatia	Zamet Hall, Rijeka
1 August 2018; 18:00	Abreu, Luz 3	(5–13)	three players 3	Zamet Hall, Rijeka
1 August 2018; 18:00		Report		Zamet Hall, Rijeka

3 August 2018; 12:00	Brazil	29–24	Japan	Zamet Hall, Rijeka
3 August 2018; 12:00	Morcineck 8	(14–11)	Kondo 5	Zamet Hall, Rijeka
3 August 2018; 12:00		Report		Zamet Hall, Rijeka

3 August 2018; 18:00	Croatia	19–28	Czech Republic	Zamet Hall, Rijeka
3 August 2018; 18:00	Jelenović 5	(9–13)	Galušková 9	Zamet Hall, Rijeka
3 August 2018; 18:00		Report		Zamet Hall, Rijeka

=== Group B ===
Pos	Team	Pld	W	D	L	GF	GA	GD	Pts	Qualification
1	South Korea	4	4	0	0	122	89	+33	8	Semifinals
2	Poland	4	2	0	2	142	94	+48	4 (Note: Poland 2 Pts, +11 GD; Romania 2 Pts, –2 GD; Spain 2 Pts, –9 GD.)	Semifinals
3	Romania	4	2	0	2	102	91	+11	4	Classification round
4	Spain	4	2	0	2	110	92	+18	4	Classification round
5	Uruguay	4	0	0	4	43	153	−110	0	Classification round

Source: Rijeka 2018
Rules for classification: 1) points; 2) head-to-head points; 3) head-to-head goal difference; 4) head-to-head number of goals scored; 5) goal difference.
Notes:

30 July 2018; 12:00	Spain	37–8	Uruguay	Zamet Hall, Rijeka
30 July 2018; 12:00	Pérez 7	(20–5)	Tito 3	Zamet Hall, Rijeka
30 July 2018; 12:00		Report		Zamet Hall, Rijeka

30 July 2018; 14:00	Romania	28–27	Poland	Zamet Hall, Rijeka
30 July 2018; 14:00	Gavrilă 7	(13–16)	Nosek, Zawistowska 6	Zamet Hall, Rijeka
30 July 2018; 14:00		Report		Zamet Hall, Rijeka

31 July 2018; 16:00	Poland	31–32	South Korea	Zamet Hall, Rijeka
31 July 2018; 16:00	Rosiak 9	(14–17)	Kim D. 13	Zamet Hall, Rijeka
31 July 2018; 16:00		Report		Zamet Hall, Rijeka

31 July 2018; 18:00	Uruguay	10–29	Romania	Zamet Hall, Rijeka
31 July 2018; 18:00	Justo 3	(3–12)	Văcariu 8	Zamet Hall, Rijeka
31 July 2018; 18:00		Report		Zamet Hall, Rijeka

1 August 2018; 14:00	South Korea	24–22	Spain	Zamet Hall, Rijeka
1 August 2018; 14:00	Kim D. 9	(10–11)	Arrojeria 5	Zamet Hall, Rijeka
1 August 2018; 14:00		Report		Zamet Hall, Rijeka

1 August 2018; 16:00	Poland	48–10	Uruguay	Zamet Hall, Rijeka
1 August 2018; 16:00	Zawistowska 10	(24–5)	Aicardi 3	Zamet Hall, Rijeka
1 August 2018; 16:00		Report		Zamet Hall, Rijeka

2 August 2018; 16:00	South Korea	39–15	Uruguay	Zamet Hall, Rijeka
2 August 2018; 16:00	Chung 9	(19–6)	Aicardi 5	Zamet Hall, Rijeka
2 August 2018; 16:00		Report		Zamet Hall, Rijeka

2 August 2018; 18:00	Spain	27–24	Romania	Zamet Hall, Rijeka
2 August 2018; 18:00	Hernández 6	(14–11)	Polocoșer 7	Zamet Hall, Rijeka
2 August 2018; 18:00		Report		Zamet Hall, Rijeka

3 August 2018; 14:00	Spain	24–36	Poland	Zamet Hall, Rijeka
3 August 2018; 14:00	Valdivia 6	(11–14)	Rosiak 8	Zamet Hall, Rijeka
3 August 2018; 14:00		Report		Zamet Hall, Rijeka

3 August 2018; 16:00	Romania	21–27	South Korea	Zamet Hall, Rijeka
3 August 2018; 16:00	Polocoșer 6	(9–16)	Kim D. 7	Zamet Hall, Rijeka
3 August 2018; 16:00		Report		Zamet Hall, Rijeka

== Classification round ==
Pos	Team	Pld	W	D	L	GF	GA	GD	Pts
5	Spain	3	3	0	0	94	56	+38	6
6	Czech Republic	3	2	0	1	74	66	+8	4 (Note: Czech Republic 22–17 Romania)
7	Romania	4	2	0	2	99	72	+27	4
8	Croatia (H)	3	1	0	2	71	74	−3	2
9	Uruguay	3	0	0	3	35	105	−70	0

Source: Rijeka 2018
Rules for classification: 1) points; 2) head-to-head points; 3) head-to-head goal difference; 4) head-to-head number of goals scored; 5) goal difference.
(H) Hosts
Notes:

4 August 2018; 12:00	Spain	30–24	Czech Republic	Zamet Hall, Rijeka
4 August 2018; 12:00	Pérez 7	(18–8)	three players 4	Zamet Hall, Rijeka
4 August 2018; 12:00		Report		Zamet Hall, Rijeka

4 August 2018; 14:00	Romania	29–13	Croatia	Zamet Hall, Rijeka
4 August 2018; 14:00	Polocoșer 6	(13–6)	Jelenović 7	Zamet Hall, Rijeka
4 August 2018; 14:00		Report		Zamet Hall, Rijeka

5 August 2018; 09:00	Romania	17–22	Czech Republic	Zamet Hall, Rijeka
5 August 2018; 09:00	Polocoșer 5	(10–9)	Pokorná 6	Zamet Hall, Rijeka
5 August 2018; 09:00		Report		Zamet Hall, Rijeka

5 August 2018; 11:00	Uruguay	17–39	Croatia	Zamet Hall, Rijeka
5 August 2018; 11:00	Pérez 4	(5–20)	Jelenović 11	Zamet Hall, Rijeka
5 August 2018; 11:00		Report		Zamet Hall, Rijeka

== Knockout stage ==
=== First to fourth place classification ===
Semifinals
4 August
A2 Japan	28
B1 South Korea	21
4 August
A1 Brazil	29
B2 Poland	27

Final
5 August
A2 Japan	27
A1 Brazil	19
Third place
5 August
B1 South Korea	22
B2 Poland	19

==== Semifinals ====
4 August 2018; 16:00	Japan	28–21	South Korea	Zamet Hall, Rijeka
4 August 2018; 16:00	Hattori 10	(16–12)	Kim D. 8	Zamet Hall, Rijeka
4 August 2018; 16:00		Report		Zamet Hall, Rijeka

5 August 2018; 18:00	Brazil	29–27	Poland	Zamet Hall, Rijeka
5 August 2018; 18:00	T. Carneiro 6	(12–17)	Rosiak 6	Zamet Hall, Rijeka
5 August 2018; 18:00		Report		Zamet Hall, Rijeka

==== Third place game ====
5 August 2018; 13:00	South Korea	22–19	Poland	Zamet Hall, Rijeka
5 August 2018; 13:00	Kim D. 11	(11–11)	Szarawaga, Zawistowska 3	Zamet Hall, Rijeka
5 August 2018; 13:00		Report		Zamet Hall, Rijeka

==== Final ====
5 August 2018; 17:00	Japan	27–19	Brazil	Zamet Hall, Rijeka
5 August 2018; 17:00	Nakayama 8	(10–11)	F. Carneiro 5	Zamet Hall, Rijeka
5 August 2018; 17:00		Report		Zamet Hall, Rijeka

== Final standing ==
Rank	Team
1st place, gold medalist(s)	Japan
2nd place, silver medalist(s)	Brazil
3rd place, bronze medalist(s)	South Korea
4	Poland
5	Spain
6	Czech Republic
7	Romania
8	Croatia
9	Uruguay

== Top scorers ==
Rank	Player	Goals
1	(South Korea) Kim Da-young	48
2	(Poland) Aleksandra Rosiak	31
3	(Japan) Maharu Kondo	30
4	(Czech Republic) Veronika Galušková	29
4	(Poland) Daria Zawistowska	29
