= 2018 Men's World University Handball Championship =

Tournament details
- Host country: Croatia
- Venue: 1 (in 1 host city)
- Dates: 30 July – 5 August 2018
- Teams: 10

Final positions
- Champions: South Korea
- Runners-up: Croatia
- Third place: Japan
- Fourth place: Portugal

Tournament statistics
- Matches played: 30
- Goals scored: 1,706 (56.87 per match)
- Top scorer: (Romania) Adrian Rotaru (57)

The 2018 Men's World University Handball Championship was the 24th edition of this Handball event organized by the FISU. It was held in Rijeka, Croatia at the Zamet Hall, from 30 July to 5 August.

== Participating teams ==
- Croatia
- Portugal
- Lithuania
- Czech Republic
- Romania
- Poland
- Egypt
- South Korea
- Japan
- Chinese Taipei

== Group stage ==
All times are local (UTC+2).

=== Group A ===
Pos	Team	Pld	W	D	L	GF	GA	GD	Pts	Qualification
1	Portugal	4	2	1	1	103	105	−2	5 (Note: Portugal 3 Pts; Croatia 2 Pts; Egypt 1 Pt.)	Semifinals
2	Croatia	4	1	3	0	108	101	+7	5	Semifinals
3	Egypt	4	2	1	1	115	109	+6	5	5–8th place semifinals
4	Czech Republic	4	1	1	2	103	104	−1	3	5–8th place semifinals
5	Lithuania	4	1	0	3	101	111	−10	2	

Source: Rijeka 2018
Rules for classification: 1) points; 2) head-to-head points; 3) head-to-head goal difference; 4) head-to-head number of goals scored; 5) goal difference.
Notes:

30 July 2018; 12:00	Lithuania	32–25	Czech Republic	Zamet Hall, Rijeka
30 July 2018; 12:00	Grigas 13	(14–15)	Gřešek, Šafránek 5	Zamet Hall, Rijeka
30 July 2018; 12:00		Report		Zamet Hall, Rijeka

30 July 2018; 14:00	Croatia	33–33	Egypt	Zamet Hall, Rijeka
30 July 2018; 14:00	Ćavar 7	(19–17)	Mohsen 8	Zamet Hall, Rijeka
30 July 2018; 14:00		Report		Zamet Hall, Rijeka

31 July 2018; 16:00	Egypt	28–30	Portugal	Zamet Hall, Rijeka
31 July 2018; 16:00	Mrawan 7	(12–17)	Coelho 11	Zamet Hall, Rijeka
31 July 2018; 16:00		Report		Zamet Hall, Rijeka

31 July 2018; 18:00	Czech Republic	25–25	Croatia	Zamet Hall, Rijeka
31 July 2018; 18:00	Bukovský 5	(13–14)	Ćavar 10	Zamet Hall, Rijeka
31 July 2018; 18:00		Report		Zamet Hall, Rijeka

1 August 2018; 16:00	Egypt	25–24	Czech Republic	Zamet Hall, Rijeka
1 August 2018; 16:00	Hazem, Mohsen 6	(11–13)	Fulnek 6	Zamet Hall, Rijeka
1 August 2018; 16:00		Report		Zamet Hall, Rijeka

1 August 2018; 18:00	Portugal	29–26	Lithuania	Zamet Hall, Rijeka
1 August 2018; 18:00	Carvalho 8	(14–14)	Grigas 8	Zamet Hall, Rijeka
1 August 2018; 18:00		Report		Zamet Hall, Rijeka

2 August 2018; 16:00	Portugal	22–29	Czech Republic	Zamet Hall, Rijeka
2 August 2018; 16:00	Coelho 10	(8–14)	Bukovský 6	Zamet Hall, Rijeka
2 August 2018; 16:00		Report		Zamet Hall, Rijeka

2 August 2018; 18:00	Lithuania	21–28	Croatia	Zamet Hall, Rijeka
2 August 2018; 18:00	Simonavičius 7	(8–17)	Ćavar, Moslavac 5	Zamet Hall, Rijeka
2 August 2018; 18:00		Report		Zamet Hall, Rijeka

3 August 2018; 16:00	Lithuania	22–29	Egypt	Zamet Hall, Rijeka
3 August 2018; 16:00	Grigas 5	(11–12)	Hazem 6	Zamet Hall, Rijeka
3 August 2018; 16:00		Report		Zamet Hall, Rijeka

3 August 2018; 18:00	Croatia	22–22	Portugal	Zamet Hall, Rijeka
3 August 2018; 18:00	Ćavar 8	(10–12)	Carvalho 9	Zamet Hall, Rijeka
3 August 2018; 18:00		Report		Zamet Hall, Rijeka

=== Group B ===
Pos	Team	Pld	W	D	L	GF	GA	GD	Pts	Qualification
1	Japan	4	3	0	1	117	102	+15	6 (Note: Japan 2 Pts, +2 GD, 54 GF; South Korea 2 Pts, +2 GD, 51 GF; Romania 2 Pts, –4 GD.)	Semifinals
2	South Korea	4	3	0	1	123	105	+18	6	Semifinals
3	Romania	4	3	0	1	119	102	+17	6	5–8th place semifinals
4	Poland	4	1	0	3	106	112	−6	2	5–8th place semifinals
5	Chinese Taipei	4	0	0	4	104	148	−44	0	

Source: Rijeka 2018
Rules for classification: 1) points; 2) head-to-head points; 3) head-to-head goal difference; 4) head-to-head number of goals scored; 5) goal difference.
Notes:

30 July 2018; 08:00	Romania	28–20	Poland	Zamet Hall, Rijeka
30 July 2018; 08:00	Rotaru 11	(15–10)	Krępa, Ossowski 5	Zamet Hall, Rijeka
30 July 2018; 08:00		Report		Zamet Hall, Rijeka

30 July 2018; 10:00	South Korea	42–30	Chinese Taipei	Zamet Hall, Rijeka
30 July 2018; 10:00	Park K. 7	Report	Lin 7	Zamet Hall, Rijeka

31 July 2018; 14:00	Chinese Taipei	25–29	Japan	Zamet Hall, Rijeka
31 July 2018; 14:00	Wu 7	(12–16)	Kawashima 6	Zamet Hall, Rijeka
31 July 2018; 14:00		Report		Zamet Hall, Rijeka

31 July 2018; 14:00	Poland	26–30	South Korea	Zamet Hall, Rijeka
31 July 2018; 14:00	Ossowski 8	(13–16)	Park K. 10	Zamet Hall, Rijeka
31 July 2018; 14:00		Report		Zamet Hall, Rijeka

1 August 2018; 12:00	Chinese Taipei	25–30	Poland	Zamet Hall, Rijeka
1 August 2018; 12:00	Pan 7	(6–17)	Kamyszek 8	Zamet Hall, Rijeka
1 August 2018; 12:00		Report		Zamet Hall, Rijeka

1 August 2018; 14:00	Japan	25–29	Romania	Zamet Hall, Rijeka
1 August 2018; 14:00	Asumi 5	(10–15)	Rotaru 15	Zamet Hall, Rijeka
1 August 2018; 14:00		Report		Zamet Hall, Rijeka

2 August 2018; 14:00	Japan	34–25	Poland	Zamet Hall, Rijeka
2 August 2018; 14:00	three players 6	(17–15)	Krupa, Lemaniak 5	Zamet Hall, Rijeka
2 August 2018; 14:00		Report		Zamet Hall, Rijeka

2 August 2018; 14:00	Romania	20–28	South Korea	Zamet Hall, Rijeka
2 August 2018; 14:00	Rotaru 6	(9–15)	Park K. 5	Zamet Hall, Rijeka
2 August 2018; 14:00		Report		Zamet Hall, Rijeka

3 August 2018; 12:00	Romania	42–29	Chinese Taipei	Zamet Hall, Rijeka
3 August 2018; 12:00	Rotaru 12	(19–15)	Wu 7	Zamet Hall, Rijeka
3 August 2018; 12:00		Report		Zamet Hall, Rijeka

3 August 2018; 14:00	South Korea	23–29	Japan	Zamet Hall, Rijeka
3 August 2018; 14:00	Kang, Park K. 6	(12–16)	Goto 6	Zamet Hall, Rijeka
3 August 2018; 14:00		Report		Zamet Hall, Rijeka

== Knockout stage ==
=== Ninth place play-off ===
4 August 2018; 10:00	Lithuania	39–38	Chinese Taipei	Zamet Hall, Rijeka
4 August 2018; 10:00	Grigas	(17–19)	three players 7	Zamet Hall, Rijeka
4 August 2018; 10:00		Report		Zamet Hall, Rijeka

5 August 2018; 09:00	Chinese Taipei	35–43	Lithuania	Zamet Hall, Rijeka
5 August 2018; 09:00	Lin 10	(18–22)	Bučinskas 10	Zamet Hall, Rijeka
5 August 2018; 09:00		Report		Zamet Hall, Rijeka

Lithuania won 82–73 on aggregate.

=== Fifth to eighth place classification ===
5–8th place semifinals
4 August
A4 Czech Republic	25
B3 Romania	22
4 August
A3 Egypt	33
B4 Poland	23

5th place
5 August
A4 Czech Republic	25
A3 Egypt	34
7th place
5 August
B3 Romania	28
B4 Poland	21

==== 5–8th place semifinals ====
4 August 2018; 12:00	Czech Republic	25–22	Romania	Zamet Hall, Rijeka
4 August 2018; 12:00	Gřešek 6	(13–15)	Rotaru 7	Zamet Hall, Rijeka
4 August 2018; 12:00		Report		Zamet Hall, Rijeka

4 August 2018; 14:00	Egypt	33–23	Poland	Zamet Hall, Rijeka
4 August 2018; 14:00		(17–11)	Kamyszek, Krupa 5	Zamet Hall, Rijeka
4 August 2018; 14:00		Report		Zamet Hall, Rijeka

==== Seventh place game ====
5 August 2018; 11:00	Romania	28–21	Poland	Zamet Hall, Rijeka
5 August 2018; 11:00	Rotaru 6	(16–9)	Lemaniak 5	Zamet Hall, Rijeka
5 August 2018; 11:00		Report		Zamet Hall, Rijeka

==== Fifth place game ====
5 August 2018; 13:00	Czech Republic	28–34	Egypt	Zamet Hall, Rijeka
5 August 2018; 13:00	Bukovský, Hanuš 5	(13–19)		Zamet Hall, Rijeka
5 August 2018; 13:00		Report		Zamet Hall, Rijeka

=== First to fourth place classification ===
Semifinals
4 August
A2 Croatia	28
B1 Japan	27
4 August
A1 Portugal	26
B2 South Korea	37

Final
5 August
A2 Croatia	31
B2 South Korea	36
Third place
5 August
B1 Japan	29
A1 Portugal	24

==== Semifinals ====
4 August 2018; 16:00	Croatia	28–27	Japan	Zamet Hall, Rijeka
4 August 2018; 16:00	Pehar 8	(18–14)	Makino 7	Zamet Hall, Rijeka
4 August 2018; 16:00		Report		Zamet Hall, Rijeka

4 August 2018; 18:00	Portugal	26–37	South Korea	Zamet Hall, Rijeka
4 August 2018; 18:00	Areias, Carvalho 5	(8–19)	Park K. 10	Zamet Hall, Rijeka
4 August 2018; 18:00		Report		Zamet Hall, Rijeka

==== Third place game ====
5 August 2018; 15:00	Japan	29–24	Portugal	Zamet Hall, Rijeka
5 August 2018; 15:00	Goto 8	(20–12)	Carvalho 8	Zamet Hall, Rijeka
5 August 2018; 15:00		Report		Zamet Hall, Rijeka

==== Final ====
5 August 2018; 19:00	Croatia	31–36	South Korea	Zamet Hall, Rijeka
5 August 2018; 19:00	Majić 8	(16–20)	Kang, Park K. 8	Zamet Hall, Rijeka
5 August 2018; 19:00		Report		Zamet Hall, Rijeka

== Final standing ==
Rank	Team
1st place, gold medalist(s)	South Korea
2nd place, silver medalist(s)	Croatia
3rd place, bronze medalist(s)	Japan
4	Portugal
5	Czech Republic
6	Egypt
7	Romania
8	Poland
9	Lithuania
10	Chinese Taipei

== Top scorers ==
Rank	Player	Goals
1	(Romania) Adrian Rotaru	57
2	(Lithuania) Ignas Grigas	48
3	(South Korea) Park Kwang-soon	46
4	(Portugal) Luís Carvalho	37
4	(Croatia) Davor Ćavar	37
