= 2016 World University Handball Championship =

Tournament details
- Host country: Spain
- Venues: 2 (in 1 host city)
- Dates: 27 June to 03 July
- Teams: 16

Final positions
- Champions: Romania (men); Spain (women)
- Runners-up: South Korea (men); Romania (women)
- Third place: Spain (men); Poland (women)
- Fourth place: Japan (men); Russia (women)

Tournament statistics
- Top scorers: (Romania) Demis Grigoraș (51 goals) (Russia) Daria Samokhina (Japan) Hikaru Matsumoto (35 goals)

Awards
- Best player: (South Korea) Jaeseo Lim (Poland) Aleksandra Zych

The 2016 World University Handball Championship was the 23rd edition of this Handball Event organized by the FISU and it was held in the city of Antequera, Spain, from 27 June to 3 July.

== Participating teams ==
Men

- Egypt
- Japan
- Portugal
- Romania
- Russia
- South Korea
- Spain
- Chinese Taipei

Women

- Czech Republic
- India
- Japan
- Poland
- Romania
- Russia
- Spain
- Uruguay

== Medal summary ==
Event	Gold	Silver	Bronze
Men's tournament	Romania	South Korea	Spain
Women's tournament	Spain	Romania	Poland

== Men's tournament ==
=== Group A ===
Team	Pld	W	D	L	GF	GA	GD	Pts
Japan	3	3	0	0	103	76	+27	6
Spain	3	2	0	1	89	77	+12	4
Russia	3	1	0	2	86	84	+2	2
Chinese Taipei	3	0	0	3	66	107	–41	0

Teams qualified to the semi-finals

27 June 2016; 13:30	Russia	25–29	Japan	Pabellón Polideportivo Municipal Fernando Argüelles, Antequera
27 June 2016; 13:30	Kiselev 7	(12–16)	Tokuda 8	Pabellón Polideportivo Municipal Fernando Argüelles, Antequera
27 June 2016; 13:30	3× (yellow card) 3× (suspension)	Report	3× (yellow card) 4× (suspension)	Pabellón Polideportivo Municipal Fernando Argüelles, Antequera

27 June 2016; 21:30	Spain	31–18	Chinese Taipei	Pabellón Polideportivo Municipal Fernando Argüelles, Antequera; Attendance: 300
27 June 2016; 21:30	Figueras 7	(18–7)	Huang 4	Pabellón Polideportivo Municipal Fernando Argüelles, Antequera; Attendance: 300
27 June 2016; 21:30	3× (yellow card)	Report	3× (yellow card) 2× (suspension)	Pabellón Polideportivo Municipal Fernando Argüelles, Antequera; Attendance: 300

28 June 2016; 18:45	Japan	41–23	Chinese Taipei	Centro de Tecnificación de Atletismo, Antequera
28 June 2016; 18:45	Tokuda 7	(16–9)	Huang, Shen 5	Centro de Tecnificación de Atletismo, Antequera
28 June 2016; 18:45	2× (yellow card) 2× (suspension)	Report	2× (yellow card) 1× (suspension)	Centro de Tecnificación de Atletismo, Antequera

28 June 2016; 18:45	Russia	26–30	Spain	Pabellón Polideportivo Municipal Fernando Argüelles, Antequera
28 June 2016; 18:45	Karlov 8	(14–13)	Figueras 8	Pabellón Polideportivo Municipal Fernando Argüelles, Antequera
28 June 2016; 18:45	3× (yellow card) 6× (suspension)	Report	3× (yellow card) 4× (suspension)	Pabellón Polideportivo Municipal Fernando Argüelles, Antequera

29 June 2016; 18:45	Spain	28–33	Japan	Pabellón Polideportivo Municipal Fernando Argüelles, Antequera
29 June 2016; 18:45	Castillo, Rial 5	(16–13)	Hori 6	Pabellón Polideportivo Municipal Fernando Argüelles, Antequera
29 June 2016; 18:45	2× (yellow card) 4× (suspension)	Report	3× (yellow card)	Pabellón Polideportivo Municipal Fernando Argüelles, Antequera

29 June 2016; 18:45	Chinese Taipei	25–35	Russia	Centro de Tecnificación de Atletismo, Antequera
29 June 2016; 18:45	Lin, Pan 7	(10–19)	Karlov 7	Centro de Tecnificación de Atletismo, Antequera
29 June 2016; 18:45	3× (yellow card) 3× (suspension)	Report	3× (yellow card) 2× (suspension)	Centro de Tecnificación de Atletismo, Antequera

=== Group B ===
Team	Pld	W	D	L	GF	GA	GD	Pts
Romania	3	2	0	1	86	82	+4	4
South Korea	3	2	0	1	90	89	+1	4
Egypt	3	2	0	1	81	79	+2	4
Portugal	3	0	0	3	83	90	–7	0

Teams qualified to the semi-finals

27 June 2016; 16:30	Romania	29–28	South Korea	Pabellón Polideportivo Municipal Fernando Argüelles, Antequera; Attendance: 200
27 June 2016; 16:30	Grigoraș 17	(14–12)	Oh 10	Pabellón Polideportivo Municipal Fernando Argüelles, Antequera; Attendance: 200
27 June 2016; 16:30	3× (yellow card) 6× (suspension)	Report	2× (yellow card) 4× (suspension)	Pabellón Polideportivo Municipal Fernando Argüelles, Antequera; Attendance: 200

27 June 2016; 16:30	Portugal	24–26	Egypt	Centro de Tecnificación de Atletismo, Antequera; Attendance: 50
27 June 2016; 16:30	Branquinho 9	(13–16)	Ramadan 8	Centro de Tecnificación de Atletismo, Antequera; Attendance: 50
27 June 2016; 16:30	3× (yellow card) 5× (suspension) 1× (red card)	Report	3× (yellow card) 3× (suspension)	Centro de Tecnificación de Atletismo, Antequera; Attendance: 50

28 June 2016; 16:30	South Korea	28–27	Egypt	Pabellón Polideportivo Municipal Fernando Argüelles, Antequera
28 June 2016; 16:30	Oh 7	(13–11)	Ramadan 6	Pabellón Polideportivo Municipal Fernando Argüelles, Antequera
28 June 2016; 16:30	3× (yellow card) 3× (suspension)	Report	3× (yellow card) 7× (suspension)	Pabellón Polideportivo Municipal Fernando Argüelles, Antequera

28 June 2016; 16:30	Romania	30–26	Portugal	Centro de Tecnificación de Atletismo, Antequera
28 June 2016; 16:30	Nistor 11	(13–10)	Branquinho 8	Centro de Tecnificación de Atletismo, Antequera
28 June 2016; 16:30	3× (yellow card) 5× (suspension)	Report	3× (yellow card) 1× (suspension)	Centro de Tecnificación de Atletismo, Antequera

29 June 2016; 16:30	Portugal	33–34	South Korea	Pabellón Polideportivo Municipal Fernando Argüelles, Antequera
29 June 2016; 16:30	Branquinho 7	(15–15)	Lim 10	Pabellón Polideportivo Municipal Fernando Argüelles, Antequera
29 June 2016; 16:30	3× (yellow card) 6× (suspension) 1× (red card)	Report	3× (yellow card) 3× (suspension)	Pabellón Polideportivo Municipal Fernando Argüelles, Antequera

29 June 2016; 16:30	Egypt	28–27	Romania	Centro de Tecnificación de Atletismo, Antequera
29 June 2016; 16:30	Omar 8	(12–16)	Grigoraș 7	Centro de Tecnificación de Atletismo, Antequera
29 June 2016; 16:30	3× (yellow card) 4× (suspension)	Report	3× (yellow card) 7× (suspension)	Centro de Tecnificación de Atletismo, Antequera

=== Knockout stage ===
Semi-finals
July 2
Japan	32
South Korea	36
July 2
Romania	29
Spain	26

Final
July 3
South Korea	20
Romania	28
Third place
July 3
Japan	27
Spain	29

==== 5th–8th place play-offs ====
Semi-finals
July 1
Russia	34
Portugal	24
July 1
Egypt	33
Chinese Taipei	27

Fifth place
July 3
Russia	32
Egypt	33
Seventh place
July 3
Portugal	36
Chinese Taipei	29

==== 5–8th place semi-finals ====
01 July 2016; 16:30	Russia	34–24	Portugal	Pabellón Polideportivo Municipal Fernando Argüelles, Antequera
01 July 2016; 16:30	Petrov 6	(14–11)	Branquinho 6	Pabellón Polideportivo Municipal Fernando Argüelles, Antequera
01 July 2016; 16:30	2× (yellow card) 3× (suspension)	Report	2× (yellow card) 5× (suspension)	Pabellón Polideportivo Municipal Fernando Argüelles, Antequera

01 July 2016; 18:45	Egypt	33–27	Chinese Taipei	Pabellón Polideportivo Municipal Fernando Argüelles, Antequera
01 July 2016; 18:45	Hassan 7	(13–15)	Lin 5	Pabellón Polideportivo Municipal Fernando Argüelles, Antequera
01 July 2016; 18:45	2× (yellow card)	Report	3× (yellow card) 2× (suspension)	Pabellón Polideportivo Municipal Fernando Argüelles, Antequera

==== Semi-finals ====
02 July 2016
16:00
Japan
32–36 (ET)
South Korea
Pabellón Polideportivo Municipal Fernando Argüelles, Antequera
Tamakawa 7
(13–15)
Oh 11
2× (yellow card) 4× (suspension)
Report
3× (yellow card) 2× (suspension)

FT: 29–29 ET: 3–7

02 July 2016; 18:15	Romania	29–26	Spain	Pabellón Polideportivo Municipal Fernando Argüelles, Antequera
02 July 2016; 18:15	Grigoraș, Rotaru 9	(18–11)	Borragan, Figueras 7	Pabellón Polideportivo Municipal Fernando Argüelles, Antequera
02 July 2016; 18:15	3× (yellow card) 3× (suspension)	Report	2× (yellow card) 4× (suspension)	Pabellón Polideportivo Municipal Fernando Argüelles, Antequera

==== 7th place game ====
03 July 2016; 10:00	Portugal	36–29	Chinese Taipei	Centro de Tecnificación de Atletismo, Antequera
03 July 2016; 10:00	Branquinho 12	(18–16)	Lin 6	Centro de Tecnificación de Atletismo, Antequera
03 July 2016; 10:00	2× (yellow card) 3× (suspension)	Report	3× (yellow card) 2× (suspension)	Centro de Tecnificación de Atletismo, Antequera

==== 5th place game ====
03 July 2016; 10:00	Russia	32–33	Egypt	Pabellón Polideportivo Municipal Fernando Argüelles, Antequera
03 July 2016; 10:00	Kiselev5	(14–15)	Omar 9	Pabellón Polideportivo Municipal Fernando Argüelles, Antequera
03 July 2016; 10:00	2× (yellow card) 5× (suspension)	Report	3× (yellow card) 1× (suspension)	Pabellón Polideportivo Municipal Fernando Argüelles, Antequera

==== Bronze medal game ====
03 July 2016; 12:15	Spain	29–27	Japan	Pabellón Polideportivo Municipal Fernando Argüelles, Antequera
03 July 2016; 12:15	Figueras 15	(19–15)	Tokuda 7	Pabellón Polideportivo Municipal Fernando Argüelles, Antequera
03 July 2016; 12:15	2× (yellow card) 5× (suspension) 1× (red card)	Report	3× (yellow card) 1× (suspension)	Pabellón Polideportivo Municipal Fernando Argüelles, Antequera

==== Gold medal game ====
03 July 2016; 17:30	Romania	28–20	South Korea	Pabellón Polideportivo Municipal Fernando Argüelles, Antequera
03 July 2016; 17:30	Grigoraș 13	(16–10)	Lim 4	Pabellón Polideportivo Municipal Fernando Argüelles, Antequera
03 July 2016; 17:30	3× (yellow card) 7× (suspension)	Report	3× (yellow card) 4× (suspension)	Pabellón Polideportivo Municipal Fernando Argüelles, Antequera

=== Final standing ===
Rank	Team
Gold medal	Romania
Silver medal	South Korea
Bronze medal	Spain
4	Japan
5	Egypt
6	Russia
7	Portugal
8	Chinese Taipei

== Women's tournament ==
=== Group Y ===
Team	Pld	W	D	L	GF	GA	GD	Pts
Romania	3	3	0	0	86	52	+34	6
Spain	3	2	0	1	94	59	+35	4
Japan	3	1	0	2	101	66	+35	2
India	3	0	0	3	40	144	–104	0

Teams qualified to the semi-finals

27 June 2016; 11:30	Spain	27–26	Japan	Pabellón Polideportivo Municipal Fernando Argüelles, Antequera
27 June 2016; 11:30	Sempere 7	(11–14)	Matsumoto 7	Pabellón Polideportivo Municipal Fernando Argüelles, Antequera
27 June 2016; 11:30	3× (yellow card) 5× (suspension)	Report	3× (yellow card) 4× (suspension)	Pabellón Polideportivo Municipal Fernando Argüelles, Antequera

27 June 2016; 11:30	India	11–43	Romania	Centro de Tecnificación de Atletismo, Antequera
27 June 2016; 11:30	Gurmail 5	(5–22)	Preda 8	Centro de Tecnificación de Atletismo, Antequera
27 June 2016; 11:30	2× (yellow card) 5× (suspension)	Report	3× (yellow card) 1× (suspension)	Centro de Tecnificación de Atletismo, Antequera

28 June 2016; 12:15	Romania	20–19	Spain	Pabellón Polideportivo Municipal Fernando Argüelles, Antequera
28 June 2016; 12:15	Tudor, Zamfirescu 4	(9–11)	Elicegui	Pabellón Polideportivo Municipal Fernando Argüelles, Antequera
28 June 2016; 12:15	3× (yellow card) 1× (suspension)	Report	3× (yellow card) 4× (suspension)	Pabellón Polideportivo Municipal Fernando Argüelles, Antequera

28 June 2016; 12:15	India	16–53	Japan	Centro de Tecnificación de Atletismo, Antequera
28 June 2016; 12:15	Maninder 7	(9–22)	Matsumoto 9	Centro de Tecnificación de Atletismo, Antequera
28 June 2016; 12:15	2× (yellow card) 2× (suspension)	Report	2× (yellow card) 3× (suspension)	Centro de Tecnificación de Atletismo, Antequera

29 June 2016; 12:15	Japan	22–23	Romania	Pabellón Polideportivo Municipal Fernando Argüelles, Antequera
29 June 2016; 12:15	Sasaki 6	(11–12)	Andrei, Vizitiu 5	Pabellón Polideportivo Municipal Fernando Argüelles, Antequera
29 June 2016; 12:15	3× (yellow card) 1× (suspension)	Report	3× (yellow card) 4× (suspension)	Pabellón Polideportivo Municipal Fernando Argüelles, Antequera

29 June 2016; 12:15	Spain	48–13	India	Centro de Tecnificación de Atletismo, Antequera
29 June 2016; 12:15	Gonzalez, Sempere 7	(23–8)	Gurmail 4	Centro de Tecnificación de Atletismo, Antequera
29 June 2016; 12:15	3× (yellow card) 3× (suspension)	Report	2× (yellow card) 4× (suspension)	Centro de Tecnificación de Atletismo, Antequera

=== Group Z ===
Team	Pld	W	D	L	GF	GA	GD	Pts
Poland	3	3	0	0	90	58	+32	6
Russia	3	2	0	1	107	65	+42	4
Czech Republic	3	1	0	2	70	77	–7	2
Uruguay	3	0	0	3	44	111	–67	0

Teams qualified to the semi-finals

27 June 2016; 09:30	Uruguay	15–27	Czech Republic	Pabellón Polideportivo Municipal Fernando Argüelles, Antequera
27 June 2016; 09:30	Elzaurdia 3	(6–13)	Kubackova, Mala 7	Pabellón Polideportivo Municipal Fernando Argüelles, Antequera
27 June 2016; 09:30	3× (yellow card) 6× (suspension)	Report	3× (yellow card) 1× (suspension)	Pabellón Polideportivo Municipal Fernando Argüelles, Antequera

27 June 2016; 09:30	Russia	24–27	Poland	Centro de Tecnificación de Atletismo, Antequera; Attendance: 54
27 June 2016; 09:30	Samokhina 5	(10–13)	Kordowiecka 5	Centro de Tecnificación de Atletismo, Antequera; Attendance: 54
27 June 2016; 09:30	3× (yellow card) 7× (suspension) 1× (red card)	Report	3× (yellow card) 5× (suspension)	Centro de Tecnificación de Atletismo, Antequera; Attendance: 54

28 June 2016; 10:00	Uruguay	16–35	Poland	Pabellón Polideportivo Municipal Fernando Argüelles, Antequera
28 June 2016; 10:00	four players 3	(7–21)	Janiszewska, Pasternak 6	Pabellón Polideportivo Municipal Fernando Argüelles, Antequera
28 June 2016; 10:00	3× (yellow card) 3× (suspension)	Report	3× (yellow card) 2× (suspension)	Pabellón Polideportivo Municipal Fernando Argüelles, Antequera

28 June 2016; 10:00	Czech Republic	25–34	Russia	Centro de Tecnificación de Atletismo, Antequera
28 June 2016; 10:00	Mala 6	(11–16)	Samokhina10	Centro de Tecnificación de Atletismo, Antequera
28 June 2016; 10:00	2× (yellow card) 4× (suspension)	Report	3× (yellow card) 6× (suspension)	Centro de Tecnificación de Atletismo, Antequera

29 June 2016; 10:00	Russia	49–13	Uruguay	Pabellón Polideportivo Municipal Fernando Argüelles, Antequera
29 June 2016; 10:00	Samokhina 10	(22–4)	Benia, Coito 3	Pabellón Polideportivo Municipal Fernando Argüelles, Antequera
29 June 2016; 10:00	2× (yellow card) 6× (suspension)	Report	2× (yellow card) 7× (suspension)	Pabellón Polideportivo Municipal Fernando Argüelles, Antequera

29 June 2016; 10:00	Poland	28–18	Czech Republic	Centro de Tecnificación de Atletismo, Antequera
29 June 2016; 10:00	Kordowiecka 8	(14–7)	Kubackova 5	Centro de Tecnificación de Atletismo, Antequera
29 June 2016; 10:00	2× (yellow card) 2× (suspension)	Report	3× (yellow card) 1× (suspension)	Centro de Tecnificación de Atletismo, Antequera

=== Knockout stage ===
Semi-finals
July 1
Romania	21
Russia	18
July 1
Poland	19
Spain	21

Final
July 2
Romania	14
Spain	20
Third place
July 2
Russia	26
Poland	27

==== 5th–8th place play-offs ====
Semi-finals
July 1
Japan	34
Uruguay	18
July 1
Czech Republic	37
India	12

Fifth place
July 2
Japan	28
Czech Republic	26
Seventh place
July 2
Uruguay	22
India	23

==== 5–8th place semi-finals ====
01 July 2016; 10:00	Japan	34–18	Uruguay	Pabellón Polideportivo Municipal Fernando Argüelles, Antequera
01 July 2016; 10:00	Matsumoto 9	(15–9)	Coito 8	Pabellón Polideportivo Municipal Fernando Argüelles, Antequera
01 July 2016; 10:00	2× (yellow card) 5× (suspension)	Report	2× (yellow card) 5× (suspension)	Pabellón Polideportivo Municipal Fernando Argüelles, Antequera

01 July 2016; 10:00	Czech Republic	37–12	India	Centro de Tecnificación de Atletismo, Antequera
01 July 2016; 10:00	Mala 11	(21–5)	Gurmail, Maninder 3	Centro de Tecnificación de Atletismo, Antequera
01 July 2016; 10:00	1× (yellow card) 1× (suspension)	Report	2× (yellow card) 2× (suspension)	Centro de Tecnificación de Atletismo, Antequera

==== Semi-finals ====
01 July 2016; 12:15	Romania	21–18	Russia	Pabellón Polideportivo Municipal Fernando Argüelles, Antequera
01 July 2016; 12:15	Pricopi 5	(10–12)	three players 3	Pabellón Polideportivo Municipal Fernando Argüelles, Antequera
01 July 2016; 12:15	2× (yellow card) 3× (suspension)	Report	2× (yellow card) 5× (suspension) 1× (red card)	Pabellón Polideportivo Municipal Fernando Argüelles, Antequera

01 July 2016; 12:15	Poland	19–21	Spain	Pabellón Polideportivo Municipal Fernando Argüelles, Antequera
01 July 2016; 12:15	Janiszewska 5	(11–12)	Sempere 6	Pabellón Polideportivo Municipal Fernando Argüelles, Antequera
01 July 2016; 12:15	3× (yellow card) 3× (suspension)	Report	3× (yellow card) 3× (suspension)	Pabellón Polideportivo Municipal Fernando Argüelles, Antequera

==== 7th place game ====
02 July 2016; 09:30	Uruguay	22–23	India	Centro de Tecnificación de Atletismo, Antequera
02 July 2016; 09:30	Coito 6	(10–10)	Gurmail 6	Centro de Tecnificación de Atletismo, Antequera
02 July 2016; 09:30	3× (yellow card) 2× (suspension)	Report	1× (suspension)	Centro de Tecnificación de Atletismo, Antequera

==== 5th place game ====
02 July 2016; 09:30	Japan	28–26	Czech Republic	Pabellón Polideportivo Municipal Fernando Argüelles, Antequera
02 July 2016; 09:30	Kawashima, Sasaki 6	(10–14)	Nigrinova 11	Pabellón Polideportivo Municipal Fernando Argüelles, Antequera
02 July 2016; 09:30	2× (yellow card) 1× (suspension)	Report	3× (yellow card) 2× (suspension)	Pabellón Polideportivo Municipal Fernando Argüelles, Antequera

==== Bronze medal game ====
02 July 2016; 11:45	Russia	26–27	Poland	Pabellón Polideportivo Municipal Fernando Argüelles, Antequera
02 July 2016; 11:45	Samokhina 8	(13–17)	Zych 13	Pabellón Polideportivo Municipal Fernando Argüelles, Antequera
02 July 2016; 11:45	3× (yellow card) 6× (suspension)	Report	3× (yellow card) 2× (suspension)	Pabellón Polideportivo Municipal Fernando Argüelles, Antequera

==== Gold medal game ====
02 July 2016; 14:00	Romania	14–20	Spain	Pabellón Polideportivo Municipal Fernando Argüelles, Antequera
02 July 2016; 14:00	Pricopi 3	(7–10)	Gonzalez 6	Pabellón Polideportivo Municipal Fernando Argüelles, Antequera
02 July 2016; 14:00	3× (yellow card) 2× (suspension)	Report	3× (yellow card) 4× (suspension)	Pabellón Polideportivo Municipal Fernando Argüelles, Antequera

=== Final standing ===
Rank	Team
Gold medal	Spain
Silver medal	Romania
Bronze medal	Poland
4	Russia
5	Japan
6	Czech Republic
7	India
8	Uruguay
