= Demis Grigoraș =

Romanian handball player (born 1993)

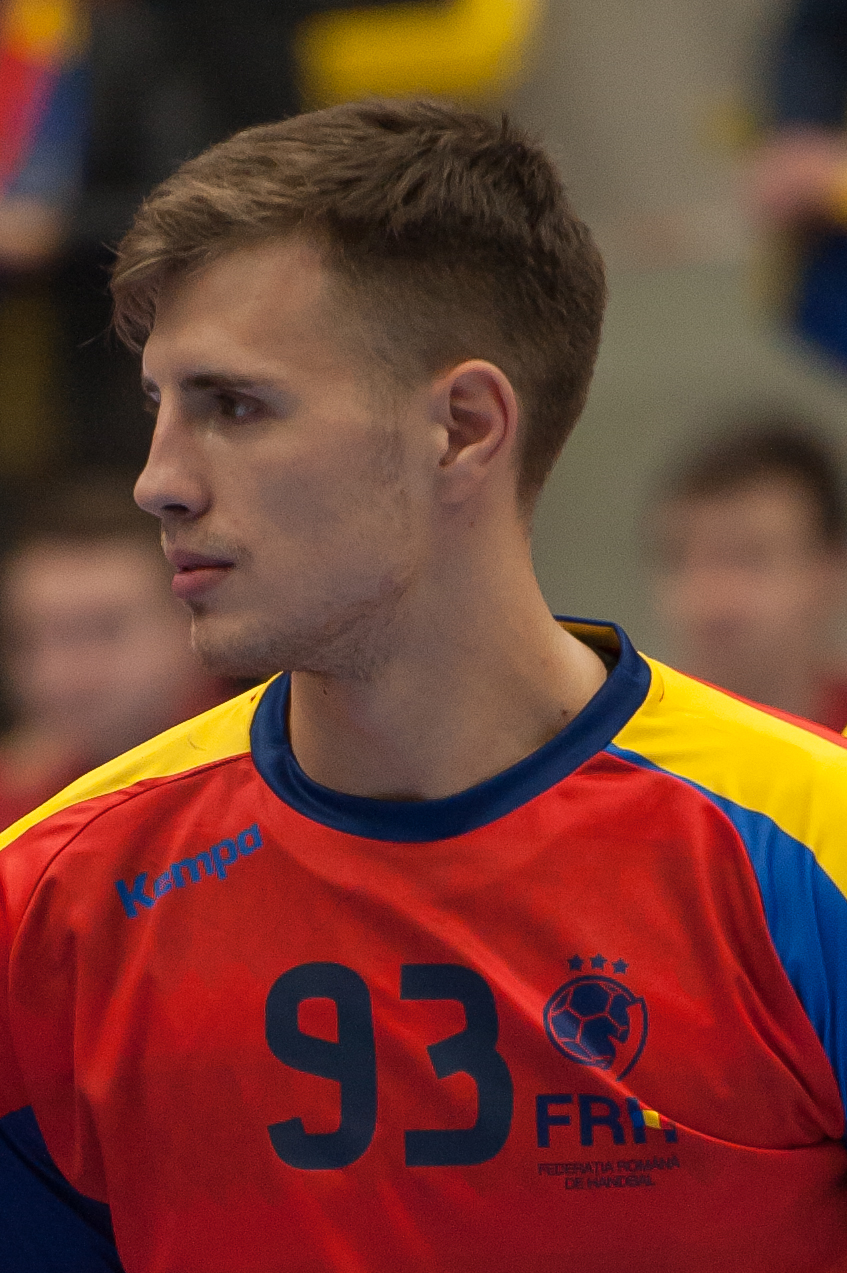

Personal information
- Full name: Demis Cosmin Grigoraș
- Nationality: Romanian
- Born: 30 June 1993 (age 33) Vaslui, Romania
- Height: 1.94 m (6 ft 4 in)

Sport
- Sport: Handball
- Position: Right back
- Current club: MOL Tatabánya KC
- Number: 30

Senior clubs
- Years: Team
- –2014: HC Caraș–Severin
- 2014–2016: SCM Politehnica Timișoara
- 2016–2019: Tatabánya KC
- 2019–2021: Chambéry SMB HB
- 2021–2025: S.L. Benfica
- 2025–: Tatabánya KC
National team
Years	Team	Apps	(Gls)
2014–	Romania	196	(809)
Medal record
World University Championship
Gold medal – first place	2016 Spain	Team

Demis Cosmin Grigoraș (born 30 June 1993) is a Romanian handball player who plays for MOL Tatabánya KC and the Romania national team.

== Achievements ==
- Nemzeti Bajnokság I:
  - Bronze Medalist: 2017, 2018
- Liga Națională:
  - Bronze Medalist: 2016
- World University Championship:
  - Gold Medalist: 2016

Benfica

- EHF European League: 2021–22

== Individual awards ==
- World University Championship Top Scorer: 2016
