= Handball at the 2015 European Youth Olympic Festival – Women's tournament =

The 2015 Handball at the European Youth Olympic Festival Women's tournament is the 10th edition, which takes place in Georgia. Denmark is the defending champion.

== Qualified teams ==
- Czech Republic
- Denmark
- Georgia
- Germany
- Montenegro
- Norway
- Romania
- Russia

== Knockout stage ==
=== Group A ===
Pos	Team	Pld	W	D	L	GF	GA	GD	Pts	Qualification
1	Denmark	3	3	0	0	76	49	+27	6	Advanced to knockout stage
2	Norway	3	2	0	1	60	63	−3	4	Advanced to knockout stage
3	Germany	3	1	0	2	57	65	−8	2	
4	Montenegro	3	0	0	3	56	72	−16	0	

Rules for classification: 1) points; 2) head-to-head points; 3) head-to-head goal difference; 4) head-to-head number of goals scored; 5) Goal difference.

27 July 2015; 14:00	Denmark	24–16	Germany	Attendance: 500; Referees: Florine Martineau (FRA)
27 July 2015; 14:00		(8–9)		Attendance: 500; Referees: Florine Martineau (FRA)

27 July 2015; 16:00	Norway	22–20	Montenegro	Attendance: 500; Referees: Bettina Balogh (HUN)
27 July 2015; 16:00		(12–11)		Attendance: 500; Referees: Bettina Balogh (HUN)

28 July 2015; 14:00	Montenegro	16–29	Denmark	Attendance: 500; Referees: Michael Haramul (CZE)
28 July 2015; 14:00		(7–12)		Attendance: 500; Referees: Michael Haramul (CZE)

28 July 2015; 16:00	Germany	20–21	Norway	Attendance: 500; Referees: Aleksandr Kirs (RUS)
28 July 2015; 16:00		(13–11)		Attendance: 500; Referees: Aleksandr Kirs (RUS)

29 July 2015; 14:00	Germany	21–20	Montenegro	Attendance: 500; Referees: Iulian Ionut Ghita (ROM)
29 July 2015; 14:00		(10–8)		Attendance: 500; Referees: Iulian Ionut Ghita (ROM)

29 July 2015; 14:00	Denmark	23–17	Norway	Attendance: 500; Referees: Tino Anthamatten (SUI)
29 July 2015; 14:00		(14–7)		Attendance: 500; Referees: Tino Anthamatten (SUI)

=== Group B ===
Pos	Team	Pld	W	D	L	GF	GA	GD	Pts	Qualification
1	Russia	3	3	0	0	83	60	+23	6	Advanced to knockout stage
2	Czech Republic	3	2	0	1	94	69	+25	4	Advanced to knockout stage
3	Romania	3	1	0	2	77	73	+4	2	
4	Georgia	3	0	0	3	58	110	−52	0	

Rules for classification: 1) points; 2) head-to-head points; 3) head-to-head goal difference; 4) head-to-head number of goals scored; 5) Goal difference.

27 July 2015; 18:00	Czech Republic	44–18	Georgia	Attendance: 500; Referees: Tino Anthamatten (SUI)
27 July 2015; 18:00		(17–10)		Attendance: 500; Referees: Tino Anthamatten (SUI)

27 July 2015; 20:00	Russia	23–20	Romania	Attendance: 500; Referees: Natalie Lundgren (SWE)
27 July 2015; 20:00		(14–10)		Attendance: 500; Referees: Natalie Lundgren (SWE)

28 July 2015; 18:00	Georgia	16–34	Russia	Attendance: 500; Referees: Tomaz Krzan (SLO)
28 July 2015; 18:00		(10–16)		Attendance: 500; Referees: Tomaz Krzan (SLO)

28 July 2015; 20:00	Romania	25–26	Czech Republic	Attendance: 500; Referees: Florine Martineau (FRA)
28 July 2015; 20:00		(10–11)		Attendance: 500; Referees: Florine Martineau (FRA)

29 July 2015; 18:00	Romania	32–24	Georgia	Attendance: 500; Referees: Bettina Balogh (HUN)
29 July 2015; 18:00		(17–13)		Attendance: 500; Referees: Bettina Balogh (HUN)

29 July 2015; 20:00	Russia	26–24	Czech Republic	Attendance: 500; Referees: Tomaz Krzan (SLO)
29 July 2015; 20:00		(12–12)		Attendance: 500; Referees: Tomaz Krzan (SLO)

== Knockout stage ==
Semi-finals
31 July
Denmark	30
Czech Republic	22
31 July
Russia	32
Norway	25

Final
1 August
Denmark	20
Russia	21
Third place
1 August
Czech Republic	23
Norway	37

=== Semifinals ===
31 July 2015; 14:00	Denmark	30–22	Czech Republic	Attendance: 750; Referees: Tomaz Krzan (SLO)
31 July 2015; 14:00		(15–14)		Attendance: 750; Referees: Tomaz Krzan (SLO)

31 July 2015; 16:15	Russia	32–25	Norway	Attendance: 650; Referees: Natalie Lundgren (SWE)
31 July 2015; 16:15		(14–10)		Attendance: 650; Referees: Natalie Lundgren (SWE)

=== Third place game ===
1 August 2015; 09:30	Czech Republic	23–37	Norway	Attendance: 600; Referees: Tino Anthamatten (SUI)
1 August 2015; 09:30		(10–22)		Attendance: 600; Referees: Tino Anthamatten (SUI)

=== Final ===
1 August 2015; 11:45	Denmark	20–21	Russia	Attendance: 1000; Referees: Bettina Balogh (HUN)
1 August 2015; 11:45		(11–10)		Attendance: 1000; Referees: Bettina Balogh (HUN)

== Final standings ==
Rank	Team
Gold medal	Russia
Silver medal	Denmark
Bronze medal	Norway
4	Czech Republic
5	Romania
6	Germany
7	Montenegro
8	Georgia
