= Ioan Bogolea =

Romanian handball player (born 1940)

Medal record

Men's Handball

Representing Romania

World Championship
Gold medal – first place	1961 Germany	Team
Gold medal – first place	1964 Czekoslovakia	Team

World University Handball Championship
Bronze medal – third place	1963 Sweden	Team

Ioan (or Ion) Bogolea (born 1940, died 2000) was a Romanian handball player, who was double world champion. He was a goalkeeper.

After playing for Flamura Roșie Sighișoara, he transferred to Dinamo Bucharest.

He won the world championships twice with the Romanian team, in 1961 in Germany and in 1964 in Czekoslovakia.

He won a bronze medal in the World University Championship in Lund, Sweden in 1963.

As a member of Dinamo Bucharest he won, among others, the national championship and the EHF Champions League.

== Awards ==
- Master of Sport, 1961
- Honored Master of Sport, 1964
