= Dmitry Kiselyov (disambiguation) =

Dmitry Kiselyov (Russian: Дмитрий Киселёв) may refer to:

- Dmitri Kiselev, Russian ice dancer
- Dmitrii Kiselev, Russian handball player
- Dmitry Kiselyov, Russian television presenter
- Dmitry Kiselyov (film director)
