= Valentin Samungi =

Romanian handball player (1942–2024)

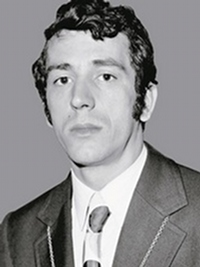
- Samungi in 1970

Personal information
- Born: 27 January 1942 Bucharest, Romania
- Died: 15 September 2024 (aged 82)
- Height: 184 cm (6 ft 0 in)
- Weight: 77 kg (170 lb)

Sport
- Sport: Handball
- Club: Dinamo Bucharest
Medal record
Representing Romania
Olympic Games
Bronze medal – third place	1972 Munich	Team
World Championship
Bronze medal – third place	1967 Sweden	Team
Gold medal – first place	1970 France	Team
World University Handball Championship
Bronze medal – third place	1963 Sweden	Team

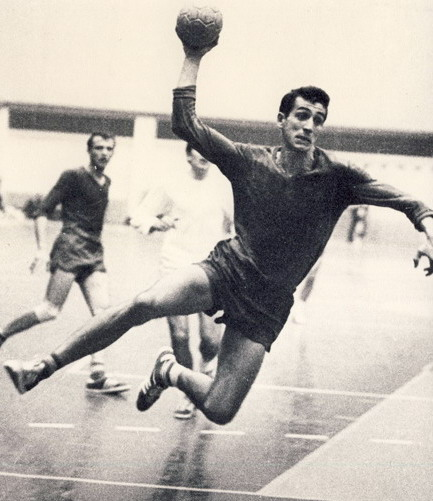

Valentin Samungi (27 January 1942 – 15 September 2024) was a Romanian handball player. He won the world title in 1970 and an Olympic bronze medal in 1972.

Samungi started playing handball in 1958, as a goalkeeper for CSS Bucharest. Between 1966 and 1977 he competed as a defender for Dinamo Bucharest. He was a member of the national team in 1961–1973 and played 113 matches scoring 134 goals. Samungi ended his playing career as captain of the first league team "Știința" later "Universitatea" Bucharest, his nickname was "The Satrap". In 1977 he retired from competition to coach the national junior (1977–1985) and senior teams (1989–1991). In 1991 he became advisor for the Ministry of Youth and Sports, and in 1995–1996 served as chairman of the Romanian Handball Federation (RHF). In 1996 he was appointed vice president of Dinamo Bucharest, and between 1999 and 2000 acted as secretary general of the RHF.

Samungi died on 15 September 2024, at the age of 82.
