= Andreea Pricopi =

Romanian handball player (born 1994)

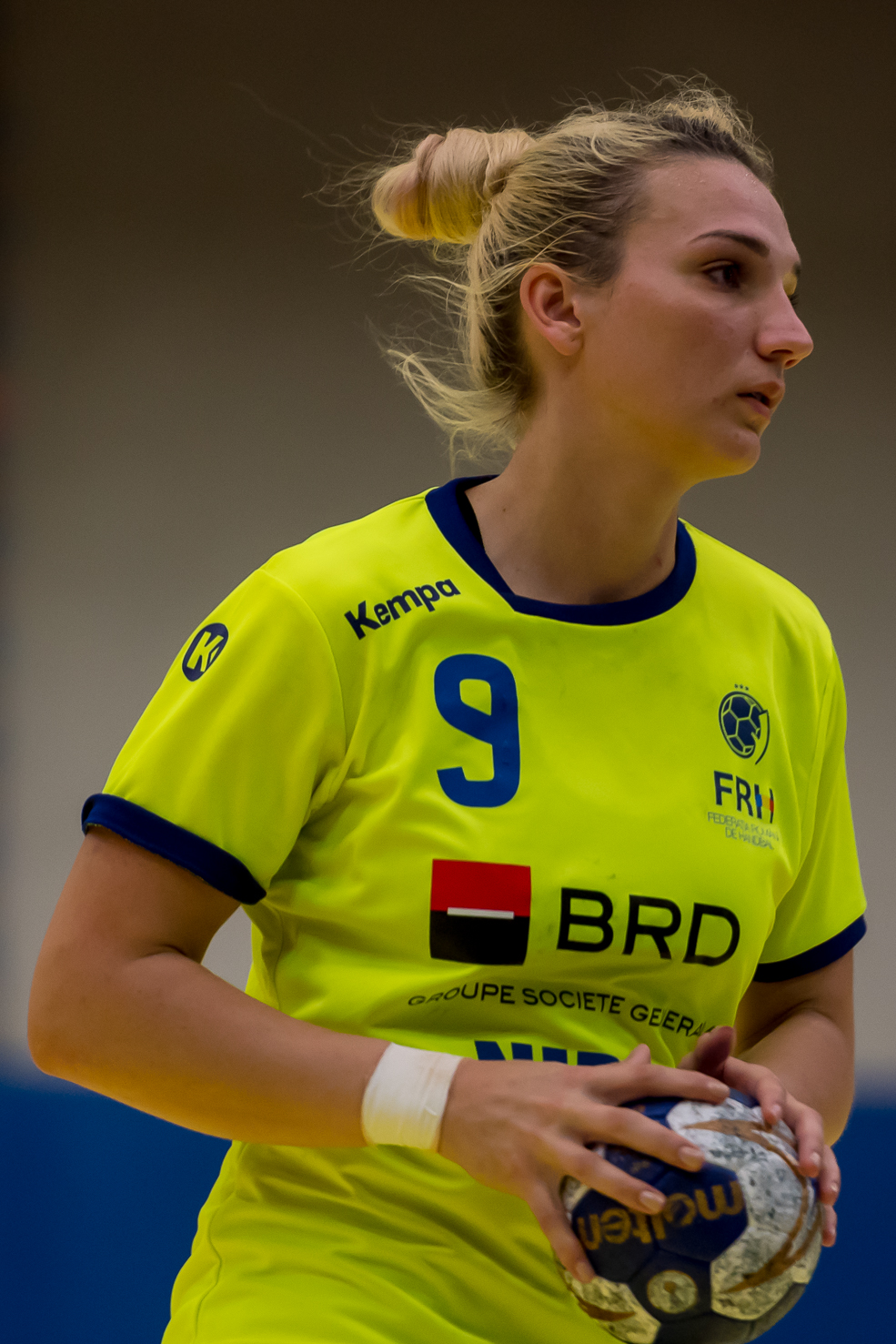

Personal information
- Full name: Dana Andreea Pricopi
- Nationality: Romanian
- Born: 20 February 1994 (age 32) Brașov, Romania
- Height: 1.73 m (5 ft 8 in)

Sport
- Sport: Handball
- Position: Centre back
- Current club: CSM București

Youth career
- Years: Team
- –2010: CSS Dinamo Brașov

Senior clubs
- Years: Team
- 2010–2017: Corona Brașov
- 2017-2018: SCM Craiova
- 2018-2019: SCM Râmnicu Vâlcea
- 2019-2022: Gloria Buzău
- 2022-: CSM București
National team
Years	Team	Apps	(Gls)
2014–	Romania	3	(5)
Medal record
World University Championship
Silver medal – second place	2016 Spain
- Updated on 1 November 2017

Andreea Rotaru (née: Pricopi; born 20 February 1994 in Brașov) is a Romanian handballer who plays for CSM București.

== International honours ==
- EHF Cup:
  - Winner: 2018
- World University Championship:
  - Silver Medalist: 2016
