= Ion Mocanu =

Romanian handball player (born 1962)

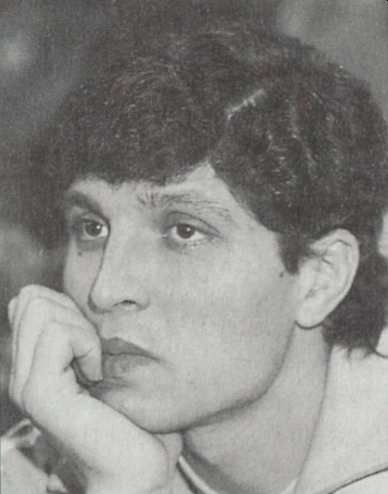
- Ion Mocanu (1992)

Personal information
- Nationality: Romanian
- Born: 8 September 1962 (age 64) Amaru, Buzău, Romania
- Height: 1.96 m (6 ft 5 in)

Sport
- Sport: Handball
- Position: Pivot

Youth career
- Years: Team
- –: (Romania) CSȘ Ploiești

Senior clubs
- Years: Team
- 1983–1991: (Romania) Dinamo București
- 1991–1993: (France) Paris Saint-Germain
- 1993–1994: (France) Villeurbanne
- 1994–1995: (France) Montpellier
- 1995–2002: (France) Pontault-Combault
- 2002–2004: (Romania) Dinamo București
National team
Years	Team	Apps	(Gls)
–	Romania	230	(635)

Teams managed
- 2007–2009: (Romania) HCM Bistriţa
- 2010–2013: (Romania) Interhandball București
- 2013–2014: (Romania) CSM București
- 2014–2015: (Romania) Dinamo București
Medal record
Men's handball
Representing Romania
World Championship
Bronze medal – third place	1990 Czechoslovakia	Team
World University Championship
Gold medal – first place	1985 West Germany	Team
Gold medal – first place	1987 Romania	Team

Ion Mocanu (born 8 September 1962) is a Romanian former handballer and current coach. He played in France and when he came back in Romania, he continued handball at Dinamo. Named the best pivot in 1992 and one of the longest-serving Romanian handball players, Ion Mocanu wore the Dinamo jersey until the age of 43. He competed in the men's tournament at the 1992 Summer Olympics.

== Honours ==
Club
Dinamo București

- Romanian League: 1985–86
- Romanian Cup: 1987–88

Montpellier

- French League: 1994–95

International
Romania

- 1990 World Championship – Bronze
- 1985 World University Games – Gold
- 1987 World University Games – Gold
