= Daria Samokhina =

Russian handball player

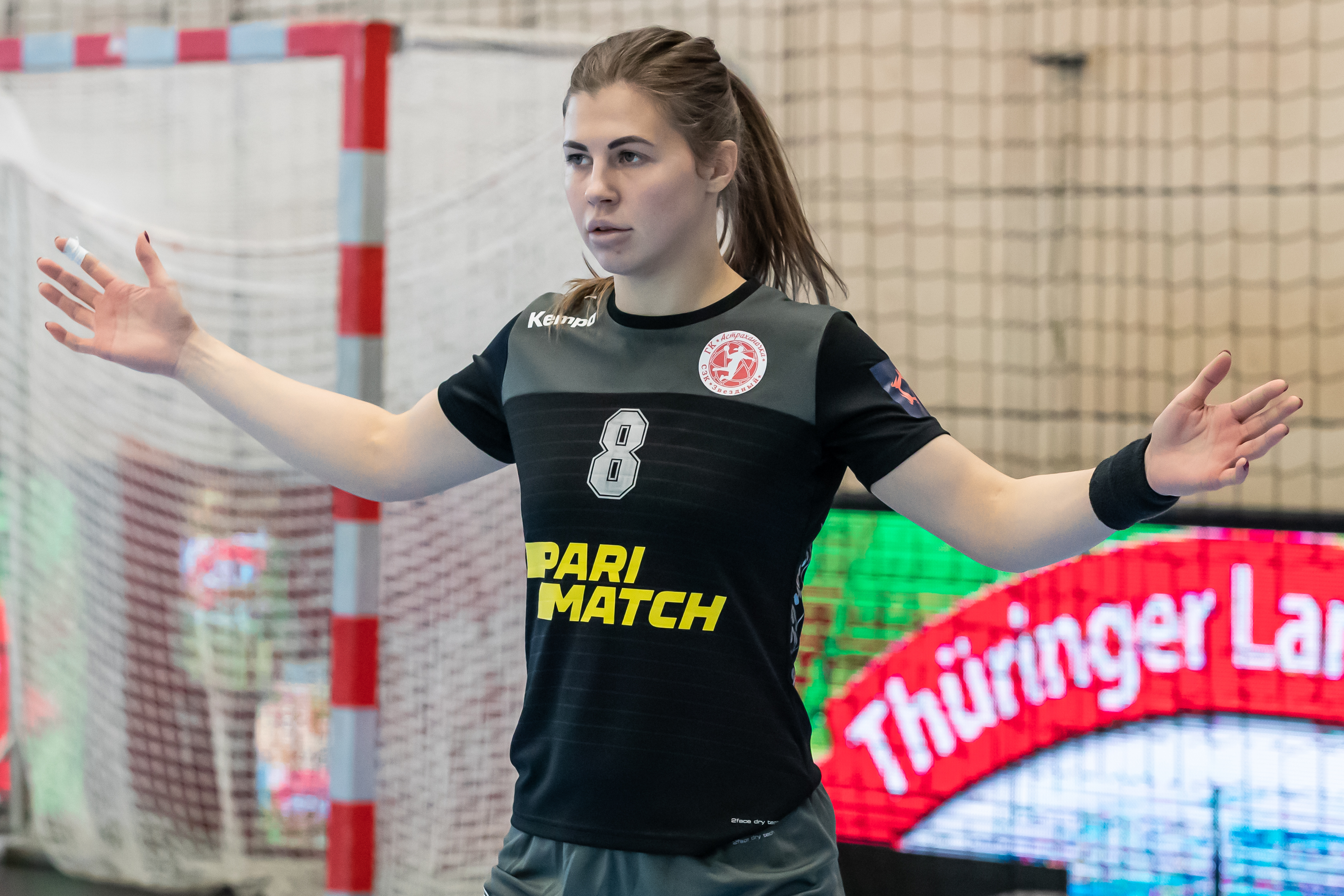

Personal information
- Full name: Daria Sergeyevna Samokhina
- Nationality: Russian
- Born: 12 August 1992 (age 34) Tolyatti, Russia
- Height: 1.75 m (5 ft 9 in)

Sport
- Sport: Handball
- Position: Left wing
- Current club: HC Astrakhanochka
- Number: 8

Senior clubs
- Years: Team
- 2012–2017: HC Lada
- 2017–: HC Astrakhanochka
National team
Years	Team	Apps	(Gls)
2016–	Russia	52	(166)
Medal record
European Championship
Silver medal – second place	2018 France

Daria Sergeyevna Samokhina (Russian: Дарья Сергеевна Самохина; born 12 August 1992) is a Russian handballer for HC Astrakhanochka and the Russian national team.

== International honours ==
- EHF Cup:
  - Winner : 2014
  - Finalist : 2018
- EHF Cup Winners' Cup:
  - Finalist : 2016

== Individual awards ==
- Russian Super League Top Scorer: 2019
- World University Handball Championship Top Scorer: 2016
