= Petra Vítková =

Czech handball player

Personal information
- Nationality: Czech
- Born: 18 August 1979 (age 47) Prague, Czechoslovakia
- Height: 1.76 m (5 ft 9 in)

Sport
- Sport: Handball
- Position: Pivot
- Current club: Baník Most
- Number: 14
National team
| Years | Team | Apps | (Gls) |
| – | Czech Republic | 208 | (337) |

Petra Vítková (née Valová; born 18 August 1979) is a Czech handballer for Baník Most and the Czech national team.
