= Mădălina Zamfirescu =

Romanian handball player (born 1994)

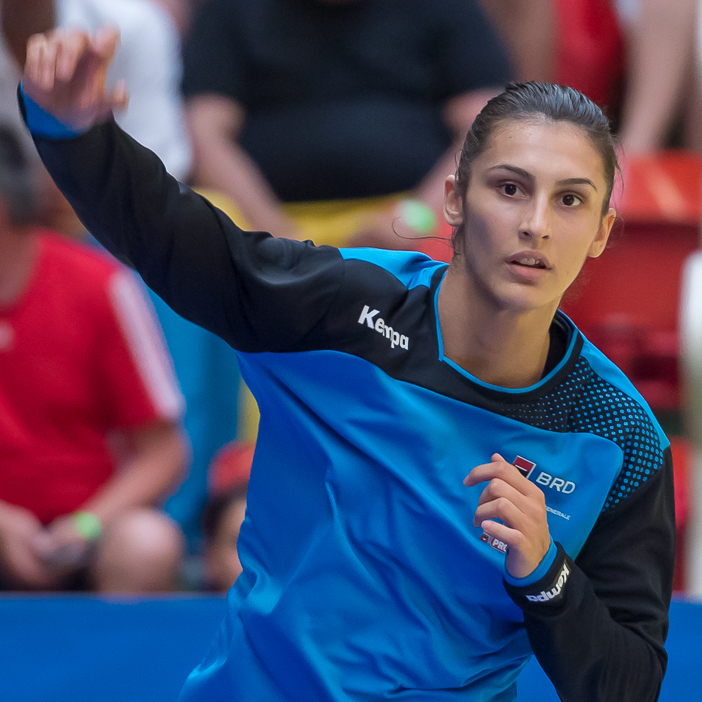

Personal information
- Full name: Mădălina Maria Zamfirescu
- Nationality: Romanian
- Born: 31 October 1994 (age 31) Râmnicu Vâlcea, Romania
- Height: 1.80 m (5 ft 11 in)

Sport
- Sport: Handball
- Position: Centre back
- Current club: Măgura Cisnădie

Youth career
- Years: Team
- –2013: CNOE Râmnicu Vâlcea

Senior clubs
- Years: Team
- 2013–2014: CSM Ploiești
- 2014–2015: HCM Baia Mare
- 2014: SCM Craiova
- 2015–2017: Dunărea Brăila
- 2017–2019: Debreceni-TVP
- 2019–2021: SCM Râmnicu Vâlcea
- 2020–2021: Dunărea Brăila(on loan)
- 2021–2024: SCM Gloria Buzău
- 1/2025–: Măgura Cisnădie
National team
Years	Team	Apps	(Gls)
2015–	Romania	43	(40)
Medal record
World University Championship
Silver medal – second place	2016 Spain

Mădălina Maria Zamfirescu (born 31 October 1994) is a Romanian handballer playing for Măgura Cisnădie and the Romanian national team.

== Achievements ==
- Liga Naţională:
  - Silver Medalist: 2017
- Romanian Cup:
  - Winner: 2021
  - Finalist:
- Romanian Supercup:
  - Winner: 2021
  - Finalist: 2019
- World University Championship:
  - Silver Medalist: 2016
