= Lucie Satrapová =

Czech handball player (born 1989)

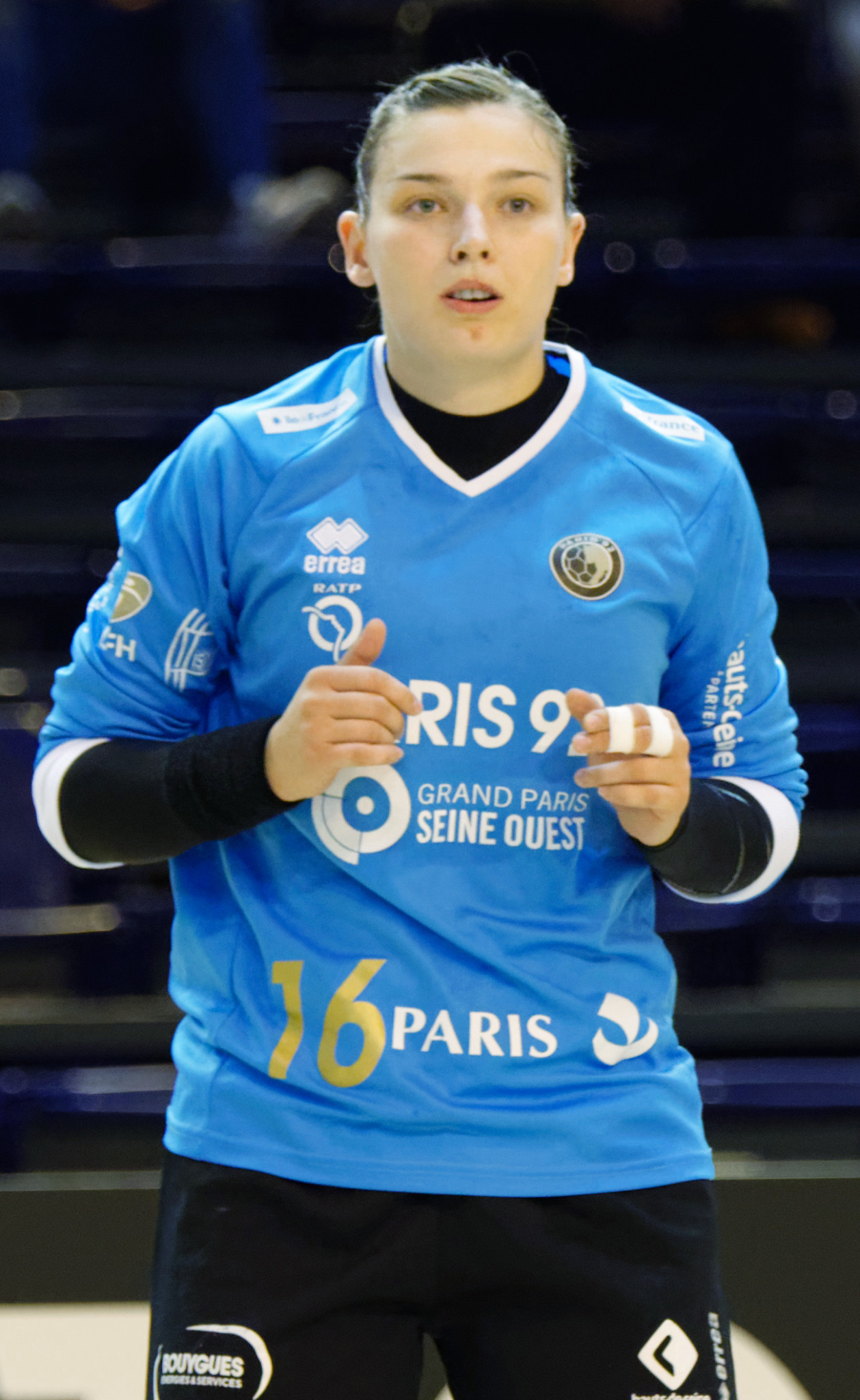

Personal information
- Nationality: Czech
- Born: 3 July 1989 (age 37) Havlíčkův Brod, Czechoslovakia
- Height: 1.83 m (6 ft 0 in)

Sport
- Sport: Handball
- Position: Goalkeeper
- Current club: Nice
- Number: 16
National team
Years	Team	Apps	(Gls)
2009–	Czech Republic	106	(4)

Lucie Satrapová (born 3 July 1989) is a Czech handball player for Paris 92 and the Czech national team.

She participated at the 2018 European Women's Handball Championship.
