= Julie Franková =

Czech handball player

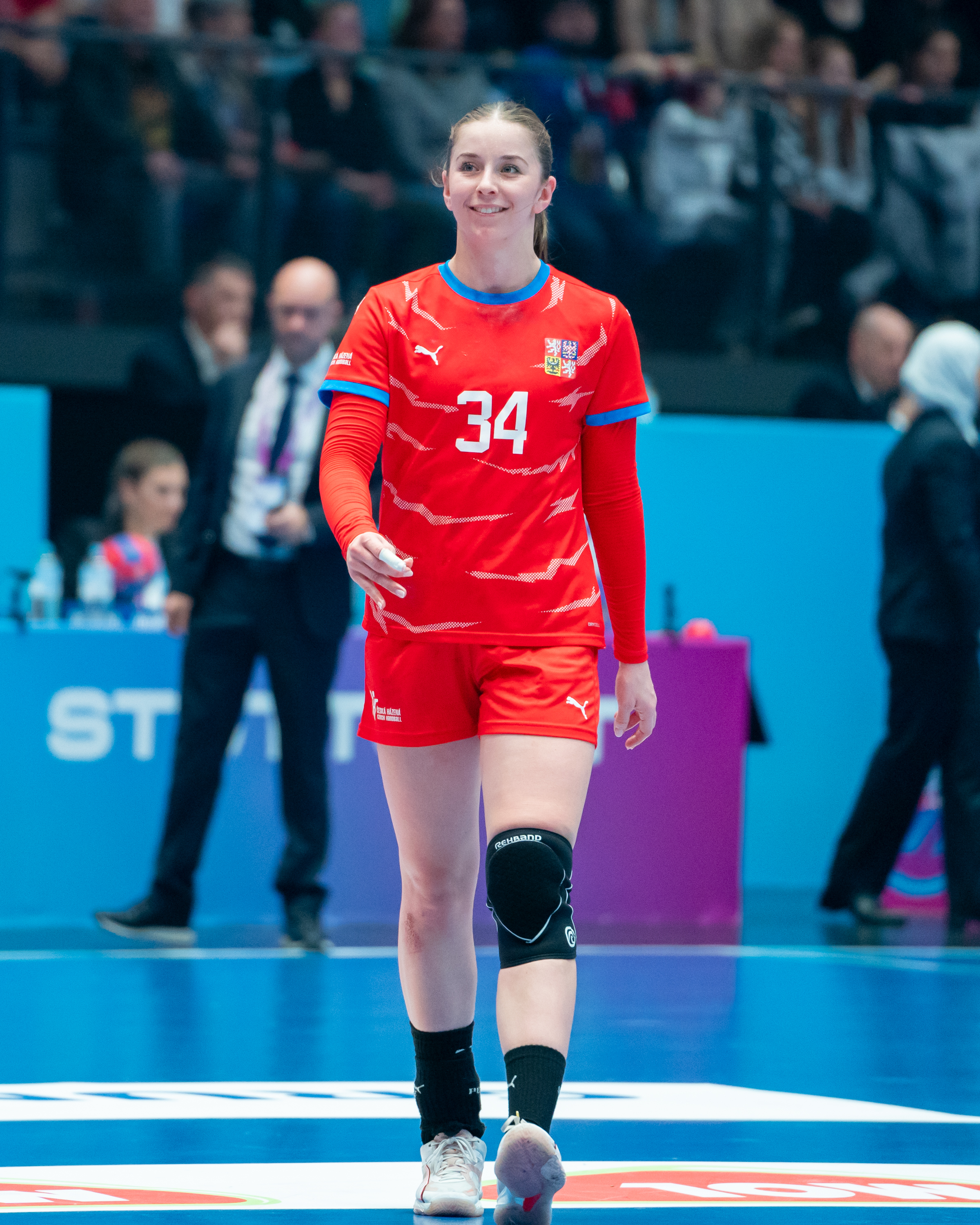

Personal information
- Nationality: Czech
- Born: 4 October 2000 (age 26) Plzeň, Czech Republic
- Height: 1.92 m (6 ft 4 in)

Sport
- Sport: Handball
- Position: Centre back
- Current club: DHC Slavia Prague
- Number: 4

Senior clubs
- Years: Team
- 2018-: DHC Slavia Prague
National team
Years	Team	Apps	(Gls)
2021–	Czech Republic	36	(28)
- Updated on 23 April 2024

Julie Franková (born 4 October 2000) is a Czech handballer for DHC Slavia Prague, where she has played her entire career. She has also featured in the Czech national team.

She participated at the 2021 World Women's Handball Championship in Spain, placing 19th.
