= 1963 World University Men's Handball Championship =

International handball competition

The 1963 World University Men's Handball Championship was the first edition of the indoor World Cup for students.

== Preliminary round ==
=== Group A ===
Pos	Team	Pld	W	D	L	GF	GA	GD	Pts	Qualification
1	Sweden (H)	3	3	0	0	65	38	+27	6	Final
2	Denmark	3	2	0	1	69	45	+24	4	Third place game
3	Spain	3	1	0	2	60	55	+5	2	
4	Japan	3	0	0	3	35	91	−56	0	

Rules for classification: 1) points; 2) head-to-head points; 3) head-to-head goal difference; 4) head-to-head number of goals scored; 5) goal difference.
(H) Hosts

1 January 1963	Denmark	24–17	Spain	Lund
1 January 1963	Andersen 9	(13–7)	Alcalde 7	Lund
1 January 1963	1× (red card)		1× (red card)	Lund

1 January 1963	Sweden	26–15	Japan	Lund

3 January 1963	Denmark	34–11	Japan	Lund

3 January 1963	Sweden	22–12	Spain	Lund

4 January 1963	Sweden	17–11	Denmark	Lund
4 January 1963		(9–7)		Lund

4 January 1963	Spain	31–9	Japan	Lund
4 January 1963	Aguirre 8	(14–3)	Adachi 5	Lund

=== Group B ===
Pos	Team	Pld	W	D	L	GF	GA	GD	Pts	Qualification
1	West Germany	2	2	0	0	30	28	+2	4	Final
2	Romania	2	1	0	1	37	31	+6	2	Third place game
3	Norway	2	0	0	2	28	36	−8	0	
4	Bulgaria	0	0	0	0	0	0	0	0	Withdraw

Rules for classification: 1) points; 2) head-to-head points; 3) head-to-head goal difference; 4) head-to-head number of goals scored; 5) goal difference.

Bulgaria withdraw from the competition. On the first match day Germany played against the local handball club H43 Lund.

1 January 1963	Romania	22–15 or 22–11	Norway	Lund

1 January 1963	H43 Lund	28–12	West Germany	Lund

3 January 1963	West Germany	14–13	Norway	Lund

4 January 1963	West Germany	16–15	Romania	Lund

== Placement games ==
=== Third place game ===
6 January 1963	Romania	27–18	Denmark	Lund
6 January 1963		(15–8)		Lund

=== Final ===
6 January 1963	Sweden	14–11	West Germany	Lund
6 January 1963		(6–8)		Lund

== Final ranking ==
According to the Romanian Handball Federation following was the final ranking:

Rank	Team
1st place, gold medalist(s)	Sweden
2nd place, silver medalist(s)	West Germany
3rd place, bronze medalist(s)	Romania
4	Denmark
5	Norway
6	Spain
7	Japan

== Teams ==
Rumania

Virgil Tale, Ioan Bogolea, Valentin Samungi, Cornel Oțelea, Ion Popescu, Mihai Fabian, Adrian Jianu, Liviu Constantinescu, Mihail Marinescu, Ion Paraschiv, Francisc Pall, Mircea Duca, Gheorghe Gruia, Adrian Jianu

Coach: Eugen Trofin
