= Adrian Rotaru =

Romanian handball player (born 1994)

Personal information
- Full name: Adrian Vlăduț Rotaru
- Nationality: Romanian
- Born: 1 July 1994 (age 32) Onești, Romania
- Height: 1.91 m (6 ft 3 in)

Sport
- Sport: Handball
- Position: Line player
- Current club: CSM București
- Number: 31

Senior clubs
- Years: Team
- 2013-: CSM București
National team
- Years: Team
- 2016-: Romania
Medal record
World University Championship
Gold medal – first place	2016 Spain	Team

Adrian Vlăduț Rotaru (born 1 July 1994) is a Romanian handballer who plays as a pivot for CSM București and the Romania national team.

== Achievements ==
- Liga Națională:
  - Silver Medalist: 2015, 2016, 2017
- Cupa României:
  - Winner: 2016

== Individual awards ==
- World University Handball Championship Top Scorer: 2018
