= Maharu Kondo =

Japanese handball player (born 1996)

Personal information
- Nationality: Japanese
- Born: 24 January 1996 (age 30)
- Height: 1.58 m (5 ft 2 in)

Sport
- Sport: Handball
- Position: Left wing
National team
- Years: Team
- –: Japan

Maharu Kondo (近藤 万春, Kondō Maharu, born 24 January 1996) is a Japanese handball player who plays as a left wing for Japan internationally. She made her Olympic debut representing Japan at the 2020 Summer Olympics.

== Career ==
She was a key member of the national team which emerged as winners during the 2018 Women's World University Handball Championship where Japan defeated Brazil 27–19 in the final to win their first World University Handball Championship title. During the same tournament, she also played a pivotal role for Japan's success by ending up as the leading goal scorer for Japan with 30.

She was included in the Japanese squad in the women's handball competition for the 2020 Summer Olympics.
