= Veronika Galušková =

Czech handball player

Personal information
- Nationality: Czech
- Born: 30 July 1998 (age 28) Plzeň, Czech Republic
- Height: 1.76 m (5 ft 9 in)

Sport
- Sport: Handball
- Position: Right back
- Current club: DHC Slavia Prague
- Number: 66

Senior clubs
- Years: Team
- 2016–: DHK Baník Most
National team
Years	Team	Apps	(Gls)
–	Czech Republic	14	(13)

Veronika Galušková (born 30 July 1998) is a Czech handballer who plays for DHC Slavia Prague and the Czech Republic national team.
