= Weronika Kordowiecka =

Polish handball player (born 1995)

Personal information
- Full name: Weronika Kordowiecka
- Nationality: Polish
- Born: 13 September 1995 (age 31) Warsaw, Poland
- Height: 1.76 m (5 ft 9 in)

Sport
- Sport: Handball
- Position: Goalkeeper
- Current club: IUVENTA Michalovce
- Number: 12

Senior clubs
- Years: Team
- 2013–2014: AZS-AWF Warsaw
- 2014–2018: GTPR Gdynia
- 2018–2019: Kisvárdai KC
- 2019–: IUVENTA Michalovce
National team
- Years: Team
- 2016–: Poland

Weronika Kordowiecka (born 13 September 1995) is a Polish handball player who plays for IUVENTA Michalovce and the Poland national team.

== Achievements ==
- Mistrzostwa Polski:
  - Winner: 2017
- Puchar Polski:
  - Winner: 2015, 2016
