= Aleksandra Rosiak =

Polish handball player (born 1997)

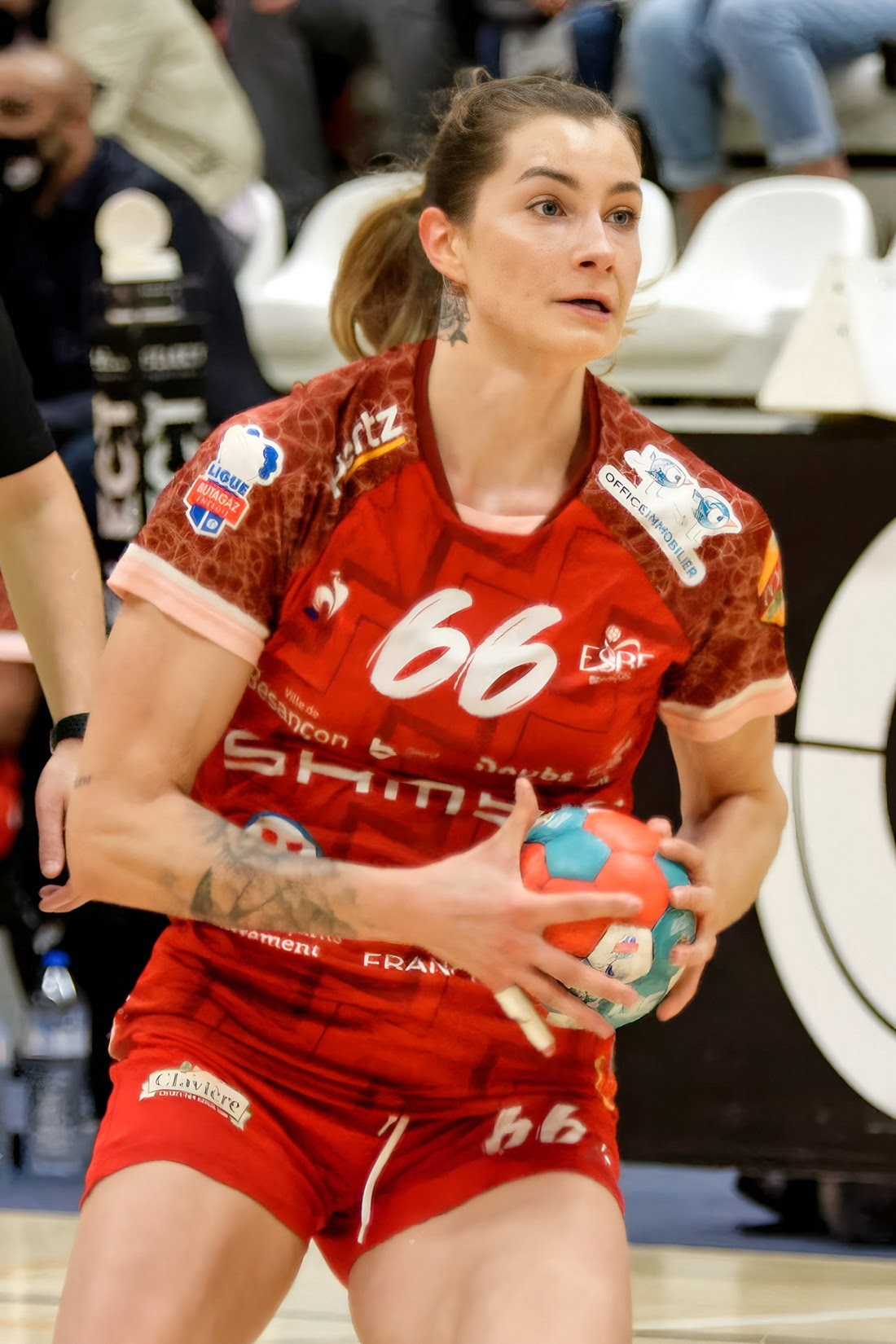
- Aleksandra Rosiak (2022)

Personal information
- Nationality: Polish
- Born: 7 July 1997 (age 29) Lubin, Poland
- Height: 1.82 m (6 ft 0 in)

Sport
- Sport: Handball
- Position: Left back
- Current club: MKS Lublin
- Number: 66

Senior clubs
- Years: Team
- 2013–2016: SMS Płock
- 2016–2021: MKS Lublin
- 2021–2022: ESBF Besançon
- 2022–2024: RK Krim
- 2024–: MKS Lublin
National team
Years	Team	Apps	(Gls)
2016–	Poland	66	(146)
- Updated on 3 November 2024

Aleksandra Rosiak (born 7 July 1997) is a Polish handballer for MKS Lublin and the Polish national team.

She participated at the 2018 European Women's Handball Championship.
