= Dmitrii Kiselev =

Russian handball player

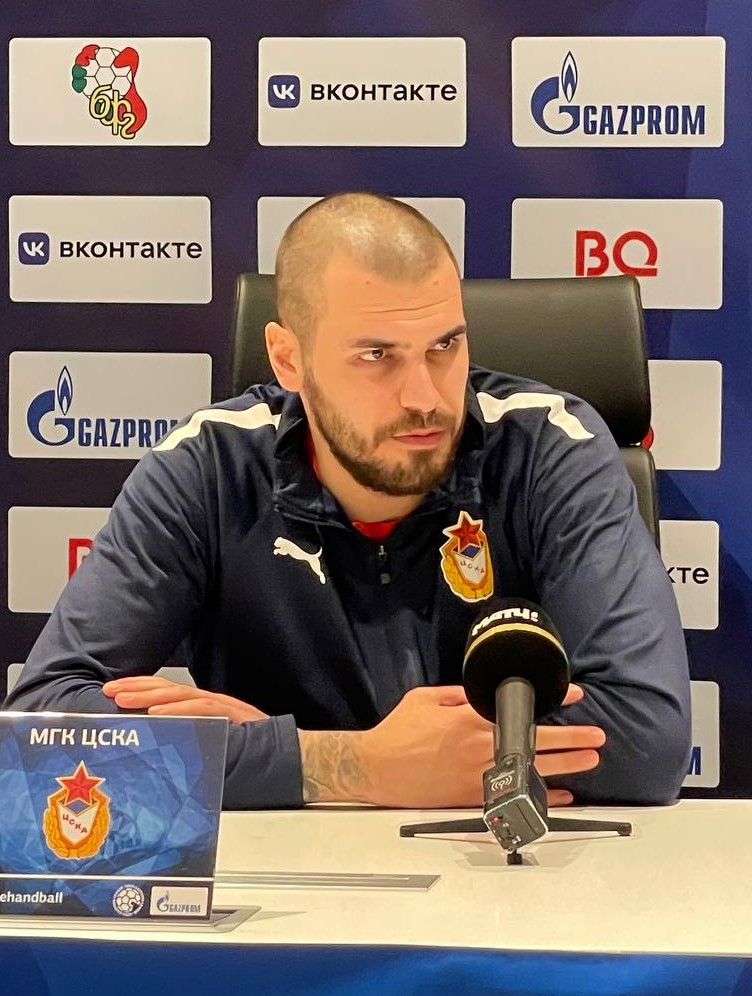

Personal information
- Nationality: Russian
- Born: 15 November 1994 (age 31) Voronezh Oblast, Russia
- Height: 1.94 m (6 ft 4 in)

Sport
- Sport: Handball
- Position: Right back
- Current club: Saint Petersburg HC
- Number: 5

Senior clubs
- Years: Team
- –2018: Saint Petersburg HC
- 2018–2019: RK Vardar
- 2019–2021: Chekhovskiye Medvedi
- 2021–2023: HBC CSKA Moscow
- 2023–: Saint Petersburg HC
National team
Years	Team	Apps	(Gls)
–	Russia	38	(93)

Dmitrii Kiselev (born 15 November 1994) is a Russian handball player for Saint Petersburg HC and the Russian national team.

He participated at the 2017 World Men's Handball Championship.
