= Daria Michalak =

Polish handball player (born 1995)

Personal information
- Nationality: Polish
- Born: 12 December 1995 (age 30) Szczecin, Poland
- Height: 1.71 m (5 ft 7 in)

Sport
- Sport: Handball
- Position: Left wing
- Current club: Brest Bretagne Handball

Senior clubs
- Years: Team
- 2014–2024: Pogoń Baltica Szczecin
- 2024-2026: HC Dunărea Brăila
- 2026-: Brest Bretagne Handball
National team
Years	Team	Apps	(Gls)
–	Poland	52	(84)
- Updated on 3 November 2024

Daria Michalak née Zawistowska (born 12 December 1995) is a Polish handballer for Brest Bretagne Handball and the Polish national team.

== International honours ==
- EHF Challenge Cup:
  - Finalist: 2015
- Carpathian Trophy:
  - Winner: 2017
