= Park Kwang-soon =

South Korean handball player

Personal information
- Nationality: Korean
- Born: 6 May 1996 (age 30)
- Height: 1.87 m (6 ft 2 in)

Sport
- Sport: Handball
- Position: Left back
- Current club: Hanam Sports Council
National team
Years	Team	Apps
–	Korea	13

Park Kwang-soon (born 6 May 1996) is a Korean handball player for Hanam Sports Council and the Korean national team.

He represented Korea at the 2019 World Men's Handball Championship.
