= Anca Mițicuș =

Romanian handball player (born 1997)

Personal information
- Full name: Anca Georgiana Mițicuș
- Nationality: Romanian
- Born: 1 May 1997 (age 29) Suceava, Romania
- Height: 1.80 m (5 ft 11 in)

Sport
- Sport: Handball
- Position: Left back
- Current club: Minaur Baia Mare
- Number: 99

Youth career
- Years: Team
- –: CSŞ 2 Baia Mare

Senior clubs
- Years: Team
- –2016: Cetate Deva
- 2016–2017: Dinamo București
- 2017–2018: CSM Roman
- 2018–: Minaur Baia Mare
National team
Years	Team	Apps	(Gls)
2018–	Romania	25	(20)
Medal record
Junior World Championship
Bronze medal – third place	2016 Russia

Anca Mițicuș (born 1 May 1997), formerly known as Anca Polocoșer, is a Romanian handballer for Minaur Baia Mare and the Romanian national team.

== International honours ==
- European League:
  - Bronze Medalist: 2021
- Junior World Championship:
  - Bronze Medalist: 2016
- Trofeul Carpaţi:
  - Second place: 2018

== Individual awards ==
- Maramureș County Sportswoman of the Year: 2016
