= Arkadiusz Ossowski =

Polish handball player (born 1996)

Personal information
- Nationality: Polish
- Born: 4 November 1996 (age 29) Kwidzyn, Poland
- Height: 1.93 m (6 ft 4 in)

Sport
- Sport: Handball
- Position: Centre back
- Current club: MMTS Kwidzyn
- Number: 18

Youth career
- Years: Team
- –2015: MTS Kwidzyn

Senior clubs
- Years: Team
- 2015–2022: MMTS Kwidzyn
- 2015–2016: → MKS Grudziądz (loan)
- 2016: → Pomezania Malbork (loan)
- 2022–: HSC 2000 Coburg
National team
Years	Team	Apps	(Gls)
2017–	Poland	18	(14)
- Updated on 9 December 2023

Arkadiusz Ossowski (born 4 November 1996) is a Polish handball player who plays for the German club HSC 2000 Coburg and the Polish national team. He signed for HSC 2000 Coburg from MMTS Kwidzyn in 2022.

He represented Poland at the 2021 World Championship.
