= Natalia Nosek =

Polish handball player (born 1998)

Personal information
- Nationality: Polish
- Born: 20 April 1998 (age 28) Kraków, Poland
- Height: 1.79

Sport
- Sport: Handball
- Position: Right back
- Current club: CS Gloria Bistrița-Năsăud (handball)
- Number: 39

Senior clubs
- Years: Team
- 2009–2011: Alfa Szarów
- 2011–2013: MOSiR Bochnia
- 2013–2017: SMS ZPRP Płock
- 2017–2019: SPR Pogoń Szczecin
- 2019–2021: MKS Lublin
- 2021–2023: ESBF Besançon
- 2023–: CS Gloria Bistrița-Năsăud
National team
Years	Team	Apps	(Gls)
–	Poland	20	(19)

Natalia Nosek (born 20 April 1998) is a Polish handball player for ESBF Besançon and the Polish national team.

She participated at the 2016 European Women's Handball Championship.
