= World University Handball Championship =

International handball competition

- Current season, competition or edition: 2026 World University Handball Championship
- Sport: Handball
- Founded: Men: 1963; Women: 1994
- Founder: International University Sports Federation
- First season: Men: 1963; Women: 1994
- No. of teams: 16
- Continents: 5
- Most recent champions: Men: France (1st title); Women: France (1st title)
- Most titles: Men: Romania (7 titles); Women: Russia (2 titles); Spain (2 titles)

The World University Handball Championship is the World University Championship (WUC) in handball competition contested by the men's and women's university's national teams of the member federations/associations of International University Sports Federation (FISU).

The men's tournament which was established in 1963 is the oldest World University Championship in 1994 there was established a women's tournament. Since 2006 both the men's and women's tournaments are held at the same place every two years.

== Men's tournament ==
=== Summary ===
Year	Host	Final			Third Place Match			Teams
Year	Host	Champion	Score	Second Place	Third Place	Score	Fourth Place	Teams
1963; Details	Lund, Sweden	Sweden	14 – 11	West Germany	Romania	27 – 18	Denmark	7
1965; Details	Madrid, Spain	West Germany		Spain	Sweden		France	10
1968; Details	Darmstadt, West Germany	Soviet Union		Romania	Czechoslovakia		Sweden	15
1971; Details	Prague, Czechoslovakia	Soviet Union		Czechoslovakia	Romania		Spain	8
1973; Details	Lund, Sweden	Romania	19 – 18 (ET)	Soviet Union	Yugoslavia	19 – 16	West Germany	15
1975; Details	Bucharest, Romania	Romania		Soviet Union	Poland		Spain	12
1977; Details	Warsaw, Poland	Romania		Yugoslavia	Poland		Soviet Union	10
1981; Details	Different Locations, France	Romania	20 − 16	France	Yugoslavia	29 − 21	Soviet Union	12
1985; Details	Darmstadt, West Germany	Romania		Soviet Union	West Germany		Yugoslavia	16
1987; Details	Bucharest, Romania	Romania		Soviet Union	Yugoslavia		Hungary	16
1990; Details	Groningen, Netherlands	Soviet Union		Romania	Netherlands		Belgium	12
1992; Details	Saint Petersburg, Russia	Austria		Hungary	Russia		Romania	4
1994; Details	İzmir, Turkey	Russia		Turkey	Ukraine		France	13
1996; Details	Nyíregyháza, Hungary	Hungary	28 – 22	Turkey	FR Yugoslavia	33 – 24	Poland	13
1998; Details	Novi Sad, FR Yugoslavia	FR Yugoslavia	34 – 25	Hungary	Russia	25 – 23	Turkey	9
2000; Details	Covilhã, Portugal	Hungary	26 – 25	Portugal	Russia	30 – 22	FR Yugoslavia	13
2002	Brasília, Brazil	Cancelled			Cancelled			-
2004; Details	Chelyabinsk, Russia	Russia		Ukraine	Croatia		Japan	8
2006; Details	Gdańsk, Poland	Russia	31 – 30	Georgia	Belarus	35 – 27	Czech Republic	13
2008; Details	Venice, Italy	Russia		Belarus	Austria	34 – 29	Turkey	16
2010; Details	Nyíregyháza, Hungary	Hungary	33 – 26	Czech Republic	Serbia	39 – 39	Japan	10
2012; Details	Blumenau, Brazil	Czech Republic	34 – 24	Portugal	Brazil	33 – 29	Poland	10
2014; Details	Guimarães, Portugal	Portugal	29 – 23	Brazil	Spain	29 – 28 (PS)	Russia	11
2015; Details	Gwangju, South Korea	Portugal	25 – 21	Serbia	Switzerland	38 – 36	South Korea	13
2016; Details	Málaga, Spain	Romania	28 – 20	South Korea	Spain	29 – 27	Japan	8
2018; Details	Rijeka, Croatia	South Korea	36 – 31	Croatia	Japan	29 – 24	Portugal	10
2020; Details	Łódź, Poland	Cancelled due to COVID-19 pandemic in Europe			Not played			—N/a
2022; Details	Pristina, Kosovo	Kosovo	33 – 30	South Korea	Spain	31 – 21	Montenegro	8
2024; Details	Antequera, Spain	Spain	33 – 30	Poland	France	32 – 29	Czech Republic	7
2026; Details	Bordeaux, France	France	35 – 34	Brazil	Spain	32 – 28	Poland	8

=== Medal table ===
Rank	Nation	Gold	Silver	Bronze	Total
1	Romania	7	2	2	11
2	Russia	5	0	3	8
3	Hungary	3	2	0	5
4	Soviet Union	2	4	0	6
5	Portugal	2	2	0	4
6	South Korea	1	2	0	3
7	Spain	1	1	4	6
7	Yugoslavia	1	1	4	6
9	France	1	1	1	3
9	West Germany	1	1	1	3
11	Czech Republic	1	1	0	2
12	Austria	1	0	1	2
12	Sweden	1	0	1	2
14	Kosovo	1	0	0	1
15	Brazil	0	2	1	3
16	Turkey	0	2	0	2
17	Poland	0	1	2	3
18	Belarus	0	1	1	2
18	Croatia	0	1	1	2
18	Czechoslovakia	0	1	1	2
18	Ukraine	0	1	1	2
22	Georgia	0	1	0	1
23	Japan	0	0	1	1
23	Netherlands	0	0	1	1
23	Serbia	0	0	1	1
Totals (25 entries)		28	27	27	82

=== Participating nations ===
Nation	(Sweden) 1963	(Spain) 1965	(West Germany) 1968	(Czechoslovakia) 1971	(Sweden) 1973	(Romania) 1975	(Poland) 1977	(France) 1981	(West Germany) 1985	(Romania) 1987	(Netherlands) 1990	(Russia) 1992	(Turkey) 1994	(Hungary) 1996	(Socialist Federal Republic of Yugoslavia) 1998	(Portugal) 2000	(Russia) 2004	(Poland) 2006	(Italy) 2008	(Hungary) 2010	(Brazil) 2012	(Portugal) 2014	(Spain) 2016	(Croatia) 2018	(Kosovo) 2022	(Spain) 2024	(Kosovo) 2026	
Albania																									8th			1
Algeria					13–15th		9–10th		7th		5th					13th												5
Argentina																											7th	1
Australia																			16th									1
Austria			15						11th	9th		1st		11th					3rd									6
Azerbaijan	Part of Soviet Union																		15th									1
Belarus	Part of Soviet Union													13th				3rd	2nd									3
Belgium		10th	11th	9th-16th			9–10th				4th																	5
Brazil									15th				9th	9th	5th	10th					3rd	2nd				5th	2nd	9
Bulgaria	WD				9–12th	7th	7th	5th	9th	5th																		6
Chile																					9th					6th		2
China																12th	6th	13th										3
Croatia	Part of Yugoslavia																3rd	12th						2nd	7th		5th	5
Cyprus																			12th	5th								2
Czech Republic	Part of Czechoslovakia																	4th	13th	2nd	1st	7th		5th		4th	6th	7
Denmark	4th		7th		9–12th																							3
Egypt																						5th	5th	6th				3
Georgia	Part of Soviet Union														6th			2nd	6th									3
Germany	2nd	1st	5th		4th	8th		8th	3rd	16th																		8
Greece											6th																	1
Finland		5th	9th						16th																			3
France		4th	8th	8th	9–12th	9th		2nd	10th				4th	10th		5th										3rd	1st	12
Hungary							5th	6th		4th		2nd	10th	1st	2nd	1st		7th	9th	1st								11
India																										7th		1
Iceland					9–12th																							1
Iran													12th															1
Israel			14th	9th-16th				9–12th		12th	10th																	5
Italy					13–15th	12th		9–12th	13th					12th					8th									6
Japan	7th					10th	8th	7th	12th	13th	11th		11th	6th	7th	11th	4th	5th	10th	4th		9th	4th	3rd				18
Kosovo	Part of Yugoslavia																P. SCG								1st			1
Kuwait																					7th							1
Latvia	Part of Soviet Union																	6th	11th									2
Lebanon																											8th	1
Lithuania	Part of Soviet Union																							9th				1
Mexico																			14th	10th	10th	11th						4
Morocco		8th								14th																		2
Montenegro	Part of Yugoslavia																P. SCG								4th			1
Netherlands		6th	13th								3rd																	3
Nigeria										10th	9th																	2
Norway	5th		6th		13–15th																							3
Poland			12th	6th	7th	3rd	3rd		5th	7th	7th		6th	4th				9th	5th	7th	4th			8th		2nd	4th	17
Portugal		9th												8th	9th	2nd					2nd	1st	7th	4th	5th			9
Romania	3rd		2nd	3rd	1st	1st	1st	1st	1st	1st	2nd	4th	7th	5th		9th						6th	1st	7th				17
Russia	Part of Soviet Union										1st	3rd	1st	7th	3rd	3rd	1st	1st	1st			4th	6th					11
Serbia	Part of Yugoslavia																P. SCG		7th	3rd								2
South Korea								9–12th	6th	6th	8th		8th								8th		2nd	1st	2nd			9
Spain	6th	2nd	10th	4th	6th	4th																3rd	3rd	1st	3rd	1st	3rd	11
Sweden	1st	3rd	4th	7th	8th																							5
Switzerland										15th																		1
Chinese Taipei													13th		7th						6th	8th	8th	10th				5
Tunisia		7th				11th	6th									8th												4
Turkey									14th	11th	12th		2nd	2nd	4th	6th	5th	8th	4th	6th	5th	10th			6th			14
Ukraine	Part of Soviet Union												3rd		8th		2nd	11th		8th								5
United Arab Emirates																				9th								1
United States								9–12th	8th	8th																		3
Discontinued teams
Czechoslovakia			3rd	2nd	5th	6th							See Czech Republic and Slovakia															4
Yugoslavia				5th	3rd	5th	2nd	3rd	4th	3rd			5th	3rd	1st	4th	See Bosnia and Herzegovina, Croatia, Kosovo, North Macedonia, Serbia and Montenegro & Slovenia											11
Serbia and Montenegro	Part of Yugoslavia																	10th	See Montenegro and Serbia									1
Soviet Union			1st	1st	2nd	2nd	4th	4th	2nd	2nd	S. (Russia)	See Azerbaijan, Belarus, Georgia, Latvia, Lithuania, Russia & Ukraine																8
Total	7	10	15	16	15	12	10	12	16	16	12	4	13	13	9	13	8	13	16	10	10	11	8	10	8	7	8	

== Women's tournament ==
=== Summary ===
Year	Host	Final			Third Place Match			Teams
Year	Host	Champion	Score	Second Place	Third Place	Score	Fourth Place	Teams
1994; Details	Bratislava, Slovakia	Slovakia		Czech Republic	Romania		Hungary	12
1996; Details	Sofia, Bulgaria	Russia	33 – 22	Poland	Romania	42 – 19	Slovakia	10
1998; Details	Wrocław, Poland	Netherlands	31 – 27	Romania	Czech Republic	21 – 19	France	11
2000; Details	Besançon, France	Russia	25 – 23	Romania	Slovakia	28 – 27	Spain	13
2002; Details	Valencia, Spain	Romania	25 – 22	Spain	Czech Republic	29 – 26	Japan	7
2006; Details	Gdańsk, Poland	Poland		Hungary	Lithuania		Japan	7
2008; Details	Venice, Italy	Turkey	27 – 26	Hungary	Romania	46 – 32	Serbia	14
2010; Details	Nyíregyháza, Hungary	Hungary	Round-robin	Romania	Czech Republic	Round-robin	Turkey	7
2012; Details	Blumenau, Brazil	Czech Republic	32 – 18	Romania	Poland	41 – 26	Brazil	6
2014; Details	Guimarães, Portugal	Brazil	24 – 17	Russia	South Korea	30 – 20	Romania	11
2015; Details	Gwangju, South Korea	Russia	38 – 36	South Korea	Serbia	23 – 18	Czech Republic	12
2016; Details	Málaga, Spain	Spain	20 – 14	Romania	Poland	27 – 26	Russia	8
2018; Details	Rijeka, Croatia	Japan	27 – 19	Brazil	South Korea	22 – 19	Poland	9
2020; Details	Łódź, Poland	Cancelled due to COVID-19 pandemic in Europe			Not played			—N/a
2022; Details	Pristina, Kosovo	South Korea	32 – 22	Spain	Kosovo	26 – 24	Czech Republic	6
2024; Details	Antequera, Spain	Spain	32 – 24	France	Poland	22 – 18	Czech Republic	7
2026; Details	Bordeaux, France	France	42 – 28	Netherlands	Czech Republic	26 – 22	Poland	8

=== Medal table ===
Rank	Nation	Gold	Silver	Bronze	Total
1	Spain	2	2	0	4
2	Russia	2	1	0	3
3	Romania	1	5	3	9
4	Hungary	1	2	0	3
5	Czech Republic	1	1	4	6
6	Poland	1	1	3	5
7	Brazil	1	1	0	2
7	France	1	1	0	2
7	Netherlands	1	1	0	2
10	South Korea	1	0	2	3
11	Slovakia	1	0	1	2
12	Japan	1	0	0	1
12	Turkey	1	0	0	1
14	Kosovo	0	0	1	1
14	Lithuania	0	0	1	1
Totals (15 entries)		15	15	15	45

=== Participating nations ===
Nation	(Slovakia) 1994	(Bulgaria) 1996	(Poland) 1998	(France) 2000	(Spain) 2002	(Poland) 2006	(Italy) 2008	(Hungary) 2010	(Brazil) 2012	(Portugal) 2014	(Spain) 2016	(Croatia) 2018	(Kosovo) 2022	(Spain) 2024	(France) 2026	
Albania													6th			1
Algeria			8th	13th												2
Azerbaijan							5th									1
Belarus							14th									1
Brazil			11th				8th	7th	4th	1st		2nd			7th	7
Bulgaria	10th	6th														2
Chile									5th					6th		2
China			6th	12th	5th		12th								6th	5
Chinese Taipei	12th	10th				6th										2
Croatia	9th											8th	5th			3
Czech Republic	2nd		3rd	9th	3rd	5th	7th	3rd	1st	7th	6th	6th	4th	4th	3rd	14
Germany	8th		5th	7th											8th	4
France		5th	4th	10th										2nd	1st	5
Hungary	4th	7th				2nd	2nd	1st								5
India											7th			7th		2
Italy							13th									1
Japan	6th	8th	10th	11th	4th	4th	11th	6th		6th	5th	1st				11
Kosovo													3rd			1
Lithuania			7th	8th		3rd	9th									4
Mexico					6th					8th						2
Moldova					7th											1
Netherlands			1st	5th										5th	2nd	4
Norway		9th														1
Poland	11th	2nd	9th			1st	10th	5th	3rd	9th	3rd	4th		3rd	4th	12
Portugal										10th						1
Romania	3rd	3rd	2nd	2nd	1st		3rd	2nd	2nd	4th	2nd	7th				11
Russia	7th	1st		1st			6th			2nd	4th					6
Serbia							4th									1
Slovakia	1st	4th		3rd												3
South Korea	5th									3rd		3rd	1st			4
Spain				4th	2nd					5th	1st	5th	2nd	1st	5th	8
Switzerland				6th												1
Turkey							1st	4th								2
Uruguay									6th	11th	8th	9th				4
Discontinued teams
Serbia and Montenegro						7th	See Serbia									1
Total	12	10	11	13	7	7	14	7	6	11	8	9	6	7	8	
