= Czech Republic women's national handball team =

Czech Republic

Information
- Association: Czech Handball Association
- Coach: Daniel Čurda; Tomáš Hlavatý
- Assistant coach: Ilona Hapková
- Captain: Markéta Jeřábková
- Most caps: Petra Vítková (195)
- Most goals: Markéta Jeřábková (606)

Colours
1st	2nd

Results

World Championship
- Appearances: 9 (First in 1995)
- Best result: 8th (2017, 2023)

European Championship
- Appearances: 8 (First in 1994)
- Best result: 8th (1994, 2002)
- Last updated on Unknown.

The Czech Republic women's national handball team is the national team of the Czech Republic. Before 1994, it was a part of the Czechoslovakia women's national handball team. Their first tournament was the 1994 European Women's Handball Championship, where they finished 7th.

== Results ==
=== Olympic Games ===
The Czech Republic has never appeared at the Olympic Games and has yet to qualify.

Year	Position	GP	W	D	L	GS	GA	GD
(United States) 1996	Did not qualify							
(Australia) 2000	Did not qualify							
(Greece) 2004	Did not qualify							
(China) 2008	Did not qualify							
(United Kingdom) 2012	Did not qualify							
(Brazil) 2016	Did not qualify							
(Japan) 2020	Did not qualify							
(France) 2024	Did not qualify							
(United States) 2028	TBD							
(Australia) 2032	TBD							
Total	0/10	0	0	0	0	0	0	0

=== World Championship ===
Year	Round	Position	GP	W	D*	L	GS	GA
(Austria) / (Hungary) 1995	13th-16th Place Game	13th	6	2	1	3	123	121
(Germany) 1997	13th	13th	5	2	1	3	162	174
(Denmark) / (Norway) 1999	Preliminary round	19th	5	1	0	4	124	121
(Italy) 2001	did not qualify							
(Croatia) 2003	Preliminary round	15th	5	2	0	3	126	125
(Russia) 2005	did not qualify							
(France) 2007	did not qualify							
(China) 2009	did not qualify							
(Brazil) 2011	did not qualify							
(Serbia) 2013	Round of 16	15th	5	2	0	4	165	166
(Denmark) 2015	did not qualify							
(Germany) 2017	Quarter-finals	8th	7	3	0	4	137	204
(Japan) 2019	did not qualify							
(Spain) 2021	Main Round	19	8	2	0	6	188	240
(Denmark) / (Norway) / (Sweden) 2023	Quarter-finals	8th	9	5	0	6	293	294
(Germany) / (Netherlands) 2025	Main round	18th	6	2	0	4	160	173
(Hungary) 2027	to be determined							
(Spain) 2029	to be determined							
(Czech Republic) / (Poland) 2031	Qualified as co-host							
Total	10/19	8th place	49	18	2	33	1341	1414

=== European Championship ===
Year	Round	Position	Pld	W	D	L	GS	GA
(Germany) 1994	7th place game	8th	6	2	0	4	118	122
(Denmark) 1996	did not qualify							
(Netherlands) 1998	did not qualify							
(Romania) 2000	did not qualify							
(Denmark) 2002	Main round	8th	7	3	0	4	162	167
(Hungary) 2004	Preliminary Round	15th	3	0	0	3	60	74
(Sweden) 2006	did not qualify							
(North Macedonia) 2008	did not qualify							
(Denmark) / (Norway) 2010	did not qualify							
(Serbia) 2012	Main round	12th	6	1	0	5	146	163
(Croatia) / (Hungary) 2014	did not qualify							
(Sweden) 2016	Main round	10th	6	1	0	5	159	174
(France) 2018	Preliminary round	15th	3	0	0	3	73	92
(Denmark) / (Norway) 2020	Preliminary round	15th	3	0	0	3	69	78
(Slovenia) / (North Macedonia) / (Montenegro) 2022	did not qualify							
(Austria) / (Hungary) / (Switzerland) 2024	Preliminary round	15th	3	1	0	2	76	81
(Czech Republic) / (Poland) / (Romania) / (Slovakia) / (Turkey) 2026	qualified as co-host							
(Denmark) / (Norway) / (Sweden) 2028	TBD							
(Belgium) (France) 2030	TBD							
(Denmark) / (Germany) / (Poland) 2032	TBD							
Total	9/20		37	8	0	27	863	951

** Red border colour indicates that tournament was held on home soil.

== Current squad ==
Squad for the 2025 World Women's Handball Championship.

Head coach: Tomáš Hlavatý / Daniel Čurda

No.	Pos.	Name	Date of birth (age)	Height	App.	Goals	Club
14	CB	Kamila Kordovská	4 December 1997 (age 28)	1.79 m	104	217	(Germany) Sport-Union Neckarsulm
17	P	Karolína Pejšová	11 June 2005 (age 21)	1.83 m	5	0	(Czech Republic) DHC Slavia Praha
22	RB	Markéta Šustáčková	9 April 1997 (age 29)	1.74 m	77	132	(Czech Republic) DHK Baník Most
23	RB	Marie Poláková	29 July 2002 (age 24)	1.75 m	10	6	(Germany) TSV Kirchhain
24	LB	Eliška Desortová	19 April 2000 (age 26)	1.75 m	35	36	(Slovakia) HC DAC Dunajská Streda
27	GK	Patricie Wizurová	1 June 2005 (age 21)	1.85 m	12	0	(Czech Republic) DHC Sokol Poruba
34	CB	Julie Franková	4 October 2000 (age 26)	1.79 m	54	37	(Czech Republic) DHK Baník Most
35	RW	Valerie Smetková	10 January 2001 (age 25)	1.72 m	21	64	(Hungary) Szombathelyi KKA
37	GK	Michaela Malá	12 January 2003 (age 23)	1.76 m	4	0	(Czech Republic) DHC Slavia Praha
38	RW	Anna Franková	2 October 1996 (age 30)	1.70 m	47	57	(Germany) TuS Metzingen
39	LB	Veronika Vávrová	26 April 2005 (age 21)	1.78 m	7	9	(Czech Republic) Házená Kynžvart
43	RB	Veronika Holečková	8 September 2003 (age 23)	1.72 m	7	5	(Czech Republic) DHC Slavia Praha
44	RW	Dominika Zachová	4 June 1996 (age 30)	1.75 m	88	245	(Czech Republic) DHK Baník Most
67	LW	Veronika Kafka Malá (c)	6 May 1994 (age 32)	1.70 m	120	394	(Norway) Storhamar HE
79	GK	Sabrina Novotná	2 July 2000 (age 26)	1.83 m	46	3	(France) Metz Handball
88	LW	Klára Kubálková	11 December 2002 (age 23)	1.74 m	10	9	(Czech Republic) DHK Zora Olomouc
91	P	Anna Jestříbková	29 February 2004 (age 22)	1.78 m	26	18	(Czech Republic) DHK Baník Most
96	LB	Charlotte Cholevová	29 July 2002 (age 24)	1.73 m	60	263	(Germany) TuS Metzingen

=== Notable players ===
A few Czech players have seen their individual performance recognized at international tournaments.

Top Scorer

- Markéta Jeřábková (left back), 63 goals, 2023 World Championship

Top goalkeepers

- Lucie Satrapová (goalkeeper), 58% saves, 2013 World Championship
