= 2021 World Women's Handball Championship squads =

This article displays the squads for the 2021 World Women's Handball Championship. Each team had a provisional list of 35 players. Each roster consisted of 18 players, of whom 16 may be fielded for each match.

Age, club, caps and goals as of 1 December 2021.

== Group A ==
=== Angola ===
The squad was announced on 11 November 2021.

Head coach: Filipe Cruz

No.	Pos.	Name	Date of birth (age)	Height	App.	Goals	Club
1	GK	Marta Alberto	10 February 1995 (aged 26)	1.82 m	0	0	(Angola) Petro de Luanda
2	CB	Vilma Nenganga	12 September 1996 (aged 25)	1.75 m	12	22	(Angola) Petro de Luanda
5	CB	Marília Quizelete	3 June 1997 (aged 24)	1.73 m	10	13	(Angola) Petro de Luanda
6	RW	Juliana Machado	6 November 1994 (aged 27)	1.72 m	67	122	(Angola) Primeiro de Agosto
8	CB	Helena Paulo	24 January 1998 (aged 23)	1.73 m	39	167	(Angola) Primeiro de Agosto
10	P	Albertina Kassoma	12 June 1996 (aged 25)	1.85 m	81	205	(Romania) Rapid București
11	P	Liliane Mário	16 November 2004 (aged 17)	1.79 m	0	0	(Angola) Primeiro de Agosto
12	GK	Helena Sousa	7 November 1994 (aged 27)	1.82 m	43	2	(Spain) Handbol Sant Quirze
13	RW	Natália Kamalandua	25 December 1998 (aged 22)	1.64 m	12	13	(Angola) Petro de Luanda
17	RB	Wuta Dombaxe	5 April 1986 (aged 35)	1.73 m	84	71	(Angola) Primeiro de Agosto
18	LB	Stélvia Pascoal	20 October 2002 (aged 19)	1.72 m	10	1	(Angola) Petro de Luanda
19	CB	Tchieza Pemba	26 January 1995 (aged 26)	1.78 m	0	0	(Angola) Petro de Luanda
20	GK	Eliane Paulo	9 March 1999 (aged 22)	1.81 m	0	0	(Angola) Primeiro de Agosto
25	P	Liliana Venâncio	19 September 1995 (aged 26)	1.91 m	37	44	(Angola) Primeiro de Agosto
80	LW	Mbongo Masseu	30 May 2003 (aged 18)	1.76 m	0	0	(Angola) Primeiro de Agosto
90	CB	Isabel Guialo	8 April 1990 (aged 31)	1.70 m	84	265	(France) Fleury Loiret HB

=== France ===
A 20-player squad was announced on 29 October 2021. It was cut to 18 on 29 November 2021.

Head coach: Olivier Krumbholz

No.	Pos.	Name	Date of birth (age)	Height	App.	Goals	Club
1	GK	Laura Glauser	20 August 1993 (aged 28)	1.80 m	85	1	(Hungary) Győri Audi ETO KC
2	CB	Méline Nocandy	25 February 1998 (aged 23)	1.75 m	38	78	(France) Metz Handball
3	RW	Alicia Toublanc	3 May 1996 (aged 25)	1.68 m	2	8	(France) Brest Bretagne Handball
6	LW	Chloé Valentini	19 April 1995 (aged 26)	1.65 m	39	80	(France) Metz Handball
7	CB	Allison Pineau	2 May 1989 (aged 32)	1.80 m	264	673	(Slovenia) RK Krim
8	LW	Coralie Lassource	1 September 1992 (aged 29)	1.70 m	42	56	(France) Brest Bretagne Handball
10	CB	Grâce Zaadi Deuna	7 July 1993 (aged 28)	1.71 m	140	255	(Russia) Rostov-Don
15	LB	Kalidiatou Niakaté	15 March 1995 (aged 26)	1.77 m	54	74	(France) Brest Bretagne Handball
16	GK	Cléopatre Darleux	1 July 1989 (aged 32)	1.75 m	178	4	(France) Brest Bretagne Handball
19	RB	Océane Sercien-Ugolin	15 December 1997 (aged 23)	1.75 m	31	51	(Slovenia) RK Krim
20	RB	Laura Flippes	13 December 1994 (aged 26)	1.71 m	90	171	(France) Paris 92
22	LB	Tamara Horacek	5 November 1995 (aged 26)	1.78 m	35	23	(France) Metz Handball
24	P	Béatrice Edwige	3 October 1988 (aged 33)	1.82 m	128	92	(Russia) Rostov-Don
26	P	Pauletta Foppa	22 December 2000 (aged 20)	1.77 m	44	98	(France) Brest Bretagne Handball
27	LB	Estelle Nze Minko	11 August 1991 (aged 30)	1.78 m	138	312	(Hungary) Győri Audi ETO KC
29	P	Oriane Ondono	14 April 1996 (aged 25)	1.80 m	0	0	(France) Neptunes de Nantes
31	RW	Lucie Granier	11 May 1999 (aged 22)	1.67 m	2	6	(France) ESBF Besançon
94	GK	Catherine Gabriel	4 September 1994 (aged 27)	1.72 m	23	0	(France) Paris 92

=== Montenegro ===
A 19-player squad was announced on 22 November 2021.

Head coach: Bojana Popović

No.	Pos.	Name	Date of birth (age)	Height	App.	Goals	Club
1	GK	Marina Rajčić	24 August 1993 (aged 28)	1.78 m	128	3	(Turkey) Kastamonu
4	RW	Jovanka Radičević	23 October 1986 (aged 35)	1.69 m	169	914	(Turkey) Kastamonu
10	CB	Matea Pletikosić	24 April 1998 (aged 23)	1.68 m	16	8	(Montenegro) ŽRK Budućnost
13	LW	Dijana Mugoša	22 October 1995 (aged 26)	1.69 m	19	14	(Croatia) RK Podravka
16	GK	Ljubica Nenezić	15 January 1997 (aged 24)	1.79 m	34	0	(Romania) SCM Gloria Buzău
22	LB	Andrijana Popović	20 April 2002 (aged 19)	1.80 m	0	0	(Montenegro) ŽRK Budućnost
23	RW	Dijana Ujkić	5 July 1996 (aged 25)	1.72 m	5	32	(France) Bourg-de-Péage
24	RB	Tanja Ašanin	5 November 1996 (aged 25)	1.88 m	0	0	(Hungary) Mosonmagyaróvári KC SE
25	RB	Đurđina Malović	5 May 1996 (aged 25)	1.82 m	15	22	(France) Toulon
26	CB	Nataša Ćorović	7 May 1999 (aged 22)	1.70 m	0	0	(Montenegro) ŽRK Budućnost
27	RB	Sanja Premović	27 November 1992 (aged 29)	1.82 m	38	6	(Turkey) Konyaaltı Belediye Spor
33	GK	Anastasija Babović	13 December 2000 (aged 20)	1.83 m	9	0	(Hungary) Dunaújvárosi Kohász KA
34	P	Tatjana Brnović	9 November 1998 (aged 23)	1.84 m	37	50	(Montenegro) ŽRK Budućnost
66	P	Ema Ramusović	28 November 1996 (aged 25)	1.87 m	68	63	(Romania) CSM București
91	LW	Ivona Pavićević	21 April 1996 (aged 25)	1.67 m	47	20	(Montenegro) ŽRK Budućnost
96	CB	Itana Grbić	1 September 1996 (aged 25)	1.69 m	58	72	(Hungary) Ferencváros
97	P	Nikolina Vukčević	28 July 2000 (aged 21)	1.79 m	10	3	(Montenegro) ŽRK Budućnost

=== Slovenia ===
A 26-player squad was announced on 16 November 2021. It was cut to 19 on 25 November 2021.

Head coach: (Montenegro) Dragan Adžić

No.	Pos.	Name	Date of birth (age)	Height	App.	Goals	Club
1	GK	Branka Zec	31 October 1986 (aged 35)	1.79 m	75	1	(Germany) VfL Waiblingen
3	P	Manca Jurič	18 January 1995 (aged 26)	1.75 m	13	10	(Slovenia) RK Krim
4	LB	Erin Novak	7 June 2002 (aged 19)	1.76 m	2	0	(Slovenia) ŽRK Krka
6	RB	Ana Gros	21 January 1991 (aged 30)	1.86 m	121	583	(Russia) CSKA Moscow
7	CB	Elizabeth Omoregie	29 December 1996 (aged 24)	1.76 m	7	24	(Romania) CSM București
9	CB	Nina Žabjek	4 March 1998 (aged 23)	1.78 m	33	25	(Slovenia) RK Krim
10	LB	Tjaša Stanko	5 November 1997 (aged 24)	1.73 m	68	315	(Slovenia) RK Krim
16	GK	Maja Vojnović	26 January 1998 (aged 23)	1.80 m	35	0	(Hungary) Siófok KC
17	P	Nataša Ljepoja	28 January 1996 (aged 25)	1.78 m	33	26	(Slovenia) RK Krim
18	CB	Nina Zulić	4 December 1995 (aged 25)	1.70 m	50	124	(Turkey) Kastamonu Belediyesi
20	RW	Alja Varagić	11 December 1990 (aged 30)	1.85 m	65	122	(Slovenia) RK Krim
21	GK	Amra Pandžić	20 September 1989 (aged 32)	1.78 m	62	1	(Romania) CS Minaur Baia Mare
28	LW	Maja Svetik	9 March 1996 (aged 25)	1.67 m	24	42	(Slovenia) RK Krim
29	RW	Živa Čopi	5 August 1998 (aged 23)	1.63 m	12	9	(Slovenia) ŽRK Krka
35	LB	Ema Hrvatin	4 January 2000 (aged 21)	1.76 m	0	0	(Germany) BSV Sachsen Zwickau
41	P	Aneja Beganović	9 November 1997 (aged 24)	1.73 m	43	68
44	RB	Dominika Mrmolja	28 April 1994 (aged 27)	1.80 m	2	0	(Hungary) Dunaújvárosi Kohász KA
66	RW	Tija Gomilar Zickero	12 May 2000 (aged 21)	1.68 m	5	5	(Slovenia) RK Krim
96	LW	Petra Kramar	29 May 1996 (aged 25)	1.73 m	0	0	(Slovenia) ŽRK Krka

== Group B ==
=== Cameroon ===
A 22-player squad was announced on 5 October 2021. The final roster was revealed on 27 November 2021.

Head coach: Serge Christian Guébogo

No.	Pos.	Name	Date of birth (age)	Height	App.	Goals	Club
1	GK	Noelle Mben	5 January 1998 (aged 23)	1.76 m	49		(Turkey) Yenimahalle Bld. SK
2	LW	Gisele Nkolo	20 January 1999 (aged 22)	1.66 m	21		(Cameroon) Dynamique de Bokito
3	LW	Yvette Yuoh	7 July 1989 (aged 32)	1.88 m	24		(Cameroon) Tonnerre Yaoundé
5	LW	Apoline Abena	16 April 1995 (aged 26)	1.74 m	4		(Cameroon) Fanz Yaoundé
9	LW	Claudia Eyenga	11 April 1991 (aged 30)	1.65 m	40		(Ivory Coast) Africa sport d'Abidjan
10	CB	Adjani Ngouoko	10 September 1993 (aged 28)	1.65 m	15		(Cameroon) Dynamique de Bokito
12	GK	Berthe Abianbakon	7 October 1988 (aged 33)	1.79 m	37		(France) La Roche-sur-Yon Vendée
14	P	Jasmine Yotchoum	2 December 1994 (aged 26)	1.90 m	54		(Cameroon) FAP Yaoundé
15	LB	Anne Essam	6 January 1992 (aged 29)	1.79 m	44		(Cameroon) FAP Yaoundé
19	LB	Cyrielle Ebanga	6 April 1997 (aged 24)	1.84 m	6		(France) ASPTT Strasbourg
22	GK	Marie Balana	24 September 1995 (aged 26)	1.78 m	16		(Cameroon) FAP Yaoundé
33	RB	Laeticia Ateba	1 December 2001 (aged 20)	1.76 m	31		(Cameroon) Fanz Yaoundé
39	CB	Karichma Ekoh	4 March 1998 (aged 23)	1.75 m	6		(France) HBC Celles-sur-Belle
44	RW	Anne Mbouchou	7 May 1995 (aged 26)	1.62 m	0	0	(Cameroon) Tonnerre Yaoundé
70	RB	Amelie Mvoua	2 October 1997 (aged 24)	1.75 m	4		(Cameroon) Fanz Yaoundé
90	RW	Clarisse Madjoufang	7 July 1993 (aged 28)	1.69 m	37		(Cameroon) FAP Yaoundé

=== Poland ===
A 20-player squad was announced on 10 November 2021. It was cut to 17 on 25 November 2021. Julia Niewiadomska replaced Magda Więckowska on 30 November 2021.

Head coach: (Norway) Arne Senstad

No.	Pos.	Name	Date of birth (age)	Height	App.	Goals	Club
2	LB	Aleksandra Zimny	21 March 1996 (aged 25)	1.90 m	8	11	(Poland) Eurobud JKS Jarosław
3	LW	Oktawia Płomińska	5 October 1998 (aged 23)	1.66 m	4	14	(Poland) MKS Lublin
6	CB	Emilia Galińska	26 December 1992 (aged 28)	1.75 m	14	3	(Poland) MKS Zagłębie Lubin
8	RB	Monika Kobylińska	9 April 1995 (aged 26)	1.77 m	68	208	(France) Brest Bretagne Handball
9	RW	Magda Balsam	20 June 1996 (aged 25)	1.72 m	9	9	(Poland) Eurobud JKS Jarosław
10	LB	Marta Gęga	16 April 1986 (aged 35)	1.84 m	64	108	(Poland) MKS Lublin
13	P	Sylwia Matuszczyk	11 June 1992 (aged 29)	1.72 m	21	22	(Poland) Eurobud JKS Jarosław
16	GK	Adrianna Płaczek	10 December 1993 (aged 27)	1.74 m	57	0	(France) Neptunes de Nantes
17	RW	Adrianna Górna	22 March 1996 (aged 25)	1.71 m	26	16	(Poland) MKS Zagłębie Lubin
21	GK	Barbara Zima	14 January 2000 (aged 21)	1.89 m	5	1	(Poland) KPR Kobierzyce
22	LB	Aleksandra Rosiak	7 July 1997 (aged 24)	1.82 m	28	36	(France) ESBF Besançon
39	RB	Natalia Nosek	20 April 1998 (aged 23)	1.79 m	24	36	(France) ESBF Besançon
44	LB	Julia Niewiadomska	11 February 2002 (aged 19)	1.74 m	4	0	(Germany) SV Union Halle-Neustadt
66	P	Joanna Szarawaga	2 April 1994 (aged 27)	1.85 m	45	62	(Poland) MKS Lublin
89	CB	Kinga Achruk	9 September 1989 (aged 32)	1.81 m	190	527	(Poland) MKS Lublin
94	CB	Romana Roszak	1 October 1994 (aged 27)	1.75 m	35	62	(Poland) MKS Lublin
96	LW	Dagmara Nocuń	2 January 1996 (aged 25)	1.60 m	18	13	(Germany) TuS Metzingen
99	GK	Monika Maliczkiewicz	15 April 1988 (aged 33)	1.80 m	21	0	(Poland) MKS Zagłębie Lubin

=== Russian Handball Federation ===
A 20-player squad was announced on 15 November 2021.

Head coach: Lyudmila Bodniyeva

No.	Pos.	Name	Date of birth (age)	Height	App.	Goals	Club
3	LW	Polina Gorshkova	22 November 1989 (aged 32)	1.73 m	34	58	(Russia) CSKA Moscow
11	GK	Anastasia Lagina	11 August 1995 (aged 26)	1.78 m	11	2	(Russia) Rostov-Don
23	LB	Elena Mikhaylichenko	14 September 2001 (aged 20)	1.80 m	21	28	(Russia) CSKA Moscow
25	RW	Olga Fomina	17 April 1989 (aged 32)	1.75 m	151	305	(Russia) HC Lada
31	CB	Karina Sabirova	23 March 1998 (aged 23)	1.81 m	27	41	(Russia) CSKA Moscow
33	CB	Ekaterina Ilina	7 March 1991 (aged 30)	1.74 m	119	318	(Russia) CSKA Moscow
35	CB	Valeriia Kirdiasheva	28 November 2000 (aged 21)	1.77 m	2	5	(Russia) HC Lada
36	RW	Yulia Managarova	27 September 1988 (aged 33)	1.67 m	70	220	(Russia) Rostov-Don
39	RB	Antonina Skorobogatchenko	14 February 1999 (aged 22)	1.82 m	58	128	(Russia) CSKA Moscow
41	LB	Veronika Nikitina	16 May 1992 (aged 29)	1.75 m	13	19	(Russia) HC Lada
51	CB	Milana Tazhenova	6 March 1999 (aged 22)	1.82 m	2	1	(Russia) Rostov-Don
55	P	Ksenia Zakordonskaya	4 March 2003 (aged 18)	1.74 m	0	0	(Russia) HC Astrakhanochka
67	P	Anastasia Illarionova	28 March 1999 (aged 22)	1.80 m	28	16	(Russia) CSKA Moscow
76	RB	Ekaterina Zelenkova	28 February 1999 (aged 22)	1.82 m	2	3	(Russia) Rostov-Don
77	CB	Yaroslava Frolova	18 May 1997 (aged 24)	1.77 m	41	90	(Russia) Rostov-Don
78	LB	Irina Korneeva	7 June 1995 (aged 26)	1.82 m	16	6	(Russia) HC Astrakhanochka
86	CB	Olga Sherbak	14 March 1998 (aged 23)	1.77 m	2	5	(Russia) HC Lada
96	LW	Yulia Markova	10 August 1996 (aged 25)	1.68 m	20	18	(Russia) CSKA Moscow
99	GK	Polina Kaplina	16 August 1999 (aged 22)	1.81 m	7	1	(Russia) CSKA Moscow

=== Serbia ===
A 23-player squad was announced on 15 November 2021. It was cut to 18 on 30 November 2021.

Head coach: (Slovenia) Uroš Bregar

No.	Pos.	Name	Date of birth (age)	Height	App.	Goals	Club
6	LB	Ivana Mitrović	3 February 1993 (aged 28)	1.76 m	5	6	(Montenegro) ŽRK Budućnost Podgorica
7	CB	Aleksandra Vukajlović	7 June 1997 (aged 24)	1.75 m	27	3	(Hungary) Érd HC
11	RB	Marija Agbaba	9 August 1995 (aged 26)	1.81 m	8	3	(Hungary) Vasas SC
13	P	Jelena Agbaba	20 June 1997 (aged 24)	1.79 m	22	43	(Hungary) Budaörs Handball
15	RB	Anđela Janjušević	18 June 1995 (aged 26)	1.78 m	56	98	(Hungary) Siófok KC
16	GK	Jovana Risović	7 October 1993 (aged 28)	1.71 m	68	3	(Slovenia) RK Krim
17	RW	Ana Kojić	4 October 1997 (aged 24)	1.63 m	16	23	(Hungary) Mosonmagyaróvári KC SE
18	CB	Tamara Radojević	6 September 1992 (aged 29)	1.72 m	74	151	(Hungary) Kisvárdai KC
19	LW	Tamara Kocić	17 July 2003 (aged 18)	1.76 m	0	0	(Serbia) ŽRK Bekament Bukovička
22	LB	Jovana Jovović	4 December 2001 (aged 19)	1.77 m	17	18	(Hungary) Budaörs Handball
24	LB	Jovana Kovačević	9 April 1996 (aged 25)	1.78 m	19	41	(Romania) CS Gloria Bistrița-Năsăud
25	LW	Aleksandra Stamenić	12 July 1998 (aged 23)	1.75 m	0	0	(Hungary) Kisvárdai KC
27	LB	Marija Jovanović	31 March 1995 (aged 26)	1.75 m	0	0	(Iceland) ÍBV
29	RW	Nataša Lovrić	2 October 2000 (aged 21)	1.74 m	0	0	(Serbia) ŽORK Jagodina
33	LB	Jovana Stoiljković	30 September 1988 (aged 33)	1.81 m	112	373	(France) Chambray
71	CB	Kristina Liščević	20 October 1989 (aged 32)	1.73 m	111	281	(Romania) SCM Râmnicu Vâlcea
83	P	Marija Petrović	18 March 1994 (aged 27)	1.83 m	13	6	(Romania) SCM Gloria Buzău
91	GK	Kristina Graovac	14 August 1991 (aged 30)	1.73 m	25	5	(Germany) Bayer Leverkusen

== Group C ==
=== Iran ===
A 27-player squad was announced on 17 November 2021. It was cut to 19 on 23 November 2021.

Head coach: Ezzatollah Razmgar

No.	Pos.	Name	Date of birth (age)	Height	App.	Goals	Club
7	LB	Maryam Yousefi	25 September 1990 (aged 31)	1.72 m	150	200	(Iran) Taasisat Daryaei
8	LW	Nourieh Abbasi	21 March 1998 (aged 23)	1.71 m	28	86	(Turkey) Antalya Anadolu SK
9	LW	Hadiseh Norouzi	11 October 1998 (aged 23)	1.72 m	50	25	(Iran) Foolad Sepahan Isfahan
10	P	Atieh Shahsavari	16 January 2000 (aged 21)	1.80 m	120	55	(Iran) Eshtad Sazeh Mashhad
11	RB	Shima Zare	6 January 1985 (aged 36)	1.77 m	200	112	(Iran) Shahid Shameli Kazeroon
12	GK	Fatemeh Khalili	30 June 1996 (aged 25)	1.74 m	200	0	(Turkey) Antalya Anadolu SK
13	RB	Shaghayegh Bapiri	4 March 1991 (aged 30)	1.62 m	285	32	(Iran) Eshtad Sazeh Mashhad
17	CB	Mina Vatanparast	10 December 1989 (aged 31)	1.67 m	30	100	(Iran) Eshtad Sazeh Mashhad
18	GK	Zeinab Bazrafkan	23 November 1992 (aged 29)	1.70 m	120	0	(Iran) Shahid Shameli Kazeroon
20	LW	Bahar Izadgashb	2 July 2000 (aged 21)	1.64 m	12	16	(Iran) Shahid Shameli Kazeroon
22	GK	Hanieh Lak	2 January 1990 (aged 31)	1.72 m	30	0	(Iran) Eshtad Sazeh Mashhad
24	RW	Hanieh Karimi	2 May 2003 (aged 18)	1.73 m	0	0	(Iran) Perspolis Behbahan
26	CB	Sona Bidad	24 June 1993 (aged 28)	1.68 m	23	12	(Iran) Shahid Shameli Kazeroon
27	RB	Arezoo Kianiara	25 January 1994 (aged 27)	1.73 m	62	26	(Iran) Eshtad Sazeh Mashhad
64	RW	Negar Zendehboudi	30 August 2002 (aged 19)	1.70 m	0	0
78	P	Elnaz Ghasemi	13 January 1996 (aged 25)	1.71 m	60	125	(Turkey) Antalya Anadolu SK

=== Kazakhstan ===
Head coach: Lyazzat Ishanova

No.	Pos.	Name	Date of birth (age)	Height	App.	Goals	Club
1	GK	Iulia Poilova	9 November 1988 (aged 33)	1.85 m	27	2	(Kazakhstan) USC Dostyk
4	P	Zlata Zvyagina	26 November 2002 (aged 19)	1.72 m	21	25	(Kazakhstan) Kaysar Club
7	LW	Kamila Serikbayeva	10 November 1998 (aged 23)	1.60 m	3	1	(Kazakhstan) USC Dostyk
15	LB	Irina Alexandrova	2 October 1994 (aged 27)	1.83 m	183	866	(Kazakhstan) USC Dostyk
16	GK	Tatyana Davydova	26 June 2000 (aged 21)	1.73 m	20	0	(Kazakhstan) Kaysar Club
17	RW	Zhanerke Seitkassym	5 December 2002 (aged 18)	1.68 m	21	31	(Kazakhstan) Kaysar Club
24	P	Natalya Poluyanko	24 October 1995 (aged 26)	1.70 m	21	29	(Kazakhstan) Kaysar Club
25	LB	Alessya Malysheva	25 July 2001 (aged 20)	1.79 m	18	32	(Kazakhstan) Kaysar Club
26	GK	Kamilla Nadirova	21 March 2005 (aged 16)	1.78 m	6	0	(Kazakhstan) Kazygurt Handball
44	P	Luiza Khassanova	20 October 2001 (aged 20)	1.62 m	7	8	(Kazakhstan) USC Dostyk
55	RB	Kristina Stepanova	8 August 2001 (aged 20)	1.78 m	27	139	(Kazakhstan) Kazygurt Handball
72	P	Valentina Degtyareva	7 January 1993 (aged 28)	1.62 m	21	16	(Kazakhstan) USC Dostyk
77	CB	Tansholpan Jumadilova	18 July 1998 (aged 23)	1.65 m	47	137	(Kazakhstan) Kazygurt Handball
96	CB	Dana Abilda	18 October 1996 (aged 25)	1.67 m	153	368	(Kazakhstan) Kaysar Club
97	LW	Xeniya Pupchenkova	18 March 2002 (aged 19)	1.68 m	15	20	(Kazakhstan) USC Dostyk
99	RB	Mariya Pupchenkova	10 March 1998 (aged 23)	1.75 m	67	118	(Kazakhstan) Kaysar Club

=== Norway ===
The squad was announced on 9 November 2021. On 22 November, Stine Skogrand announced her pregnancy, and withdrew from the squad. On 3 December, Malin Aune was added to the squad.

Head coach: (Iceland) Thorir Hergeirsson

No.	Pos.	Name	Date of birth (age)	Height	App.	Goals	Club
2	CB	Henny Reistad	9 February 1999 (aged 22)	1.81 m	39	122	(Denmark) Team Esbjerg
3	LB	Emilie Hegh Arntzen	1 January 1994 (aged 27)	1.84 m	121	204	(Romania) CSM București
4	LB	Veronica Kristiansen	10 July 1990 (aged 31)	1.75 m	157	516	(Hungary) Győri Audi ETO KC
9	RB	Nora Mørk	5 April 1991 (aged 30)	1.67 m	144	709	(Norway) Vipers Kristiansand
10	CB	Stine Bredal Oftedal	25 September 1991 (aged 30)	1.68 m	215	586	(Hungary) Győri Audi ETO KC
11	RW	Malin Aune	4 March 1995 (aged 26)	1.65 m	72	138	(Romania) CSM București
12	GK	Silje Solberg	16 June 1990 (aged 31)	1.78 m	168	3	(Hungary) Győri Audi ETO KC
13	P	Kari Brattset Dale	15 February 1991 (aged 30)	1.83 m	91	226	(Hungary) Győri Audi ETO KC
15	P	Vilde Ingstad	18 December 1994 (aged 26)	1.78 m	81	61	(Denmark) Team Esbjerg
16	GK	Katrine Lunde	30 March 1980 (aged 41)	1.80 m	319	3	(Norway) Vipers Kristiansand
19	RB	Moa Högdahl	14 March 1996 (aged 25)	1.78 m	27	34	(Denmark) Viborg HK
20	RW	Marit Røsberg Jacobsen	25 February 1994 (aged 27)	1.65 m	86	144	(Denmark) Team Esbjerg
23	LW	Camilla Herrem	8 October 1986 (aged 35)	1.67 m	277	780	(Norway) Sola HK
24	LW	Sanna Solberg-Isaksen	16 June 1990 (aged 31)	1.78 m	172	318	(Denmark) Team Esbjerg
25	LB	Kristine Breistøl	23 August 1993 (aged 28)	1.92 m	31	35	(Denmark) Team Esbjerg
27	RW	Emilie Hovden	5 April 1996 (aged 25)	1.63 m	3	8	(Norway) Storhamar HE
28	GK	Rikke Granlund	14 November 1989 (aged 32)	1.72 m	9	0	(France) Chambray Touraine Handball
30	P	Maren Nyland Aardahl	2 March 1994 (aged 27)	1.82 m	4	6	(Denmark) Odense Håndbold

=== Romania ===
A 21-player squad was announced on 16 November 2021. It was cut to 18 on 30 November 2021. On 4 December 2021, Alexandra Badea replaced Oana Borș in the squad due to a knee injury in the opening match.

Head coach: Adrian Vasile

No.	Pos.	Name	Date of birth (age)	Height	App.	Goals	Club
2	LW	Nicoleta Dincă	2 July 1988 (aged 33)	1.73 m	35	27	(Romania) Gloria Bistrița
3	CB	Mădălina Zamfirescu	31 October 1994 (aged 27)	1.80 m	42	35	(Romania) Gloria Buzău
6	P	Alexandra Subțirică	8 December 1987 (aged 33)	1.70 m	8	4	(Romania) Gloria Buzău
9	LW	Ana Maria Tănăsie	6 April 1994 (aged 27)	1.72 m	9	8	(Romania) Minaur Baia Mare
12	GK	Diana Ciucă	1 June 2000 (aged 21)	1.80 m	14	0	(Romania) Rapid București
13	CB	Cristina Laslo	10 April 1996 (aged 25)	1.76 m	52	71	(Romania) Minaur Baia Mare
14	LB	Bianca Bazaliu	30 July 1997 (aged 24)	1.83 m	4	6	(Croatia) RK Podravka Koprivnica
20	GK	Iulia Dumanska	15 August 1996 (aged 25)	1.78 m	55	0	(Croatia) RK Podravka Koprivnica
21	P	Crina Pintea	3 April 1990 (aged 31)	1.92 m	95	139	(Hungary) Győri Audi ETO KC
26	LB	Anca Polocoșer	1 May 1997 (aged 24)	1.80 m	23	21	(Romania) Minaur Baia Mare
27	P	Lorena Ostase	25 July 1997 (aged 24)	1.79 m	20	17	(Romania) CSM Slatina
29	CB	Andreea Rotaru	20 February 1994 (aged 27)	1.75 m	19	11	(Romania) SCM Craiova
31	LB	Bianca Harabagiu	31 May 1995 (aged 26)	1.82 m	17	9	(Romania) Gloria Buzău
37	RW	Alexandra Badea	22 May 1998 (aged 23)	1.75 m	0	0	(Romania) Rapid București
55	RW	Oana Borș	27 November 2003 (aged 18)	1.71 m	2	0	(Romania) Minaur Baia Mare
89	RW	Laura Moisă	21 August 1989 (aged 32)	1.73 m	84	42	(Romania) Gloria Bistrița
96	RB	Alina Ilie	13 May 1996 (aged 25)	1.77 m	4	3	(Romania) Gloria Buzău
97	LW	Alexandra Dindiligan	16 February 1997 (aged 24)	1.70 m	6	1	(Romania) CSM București
98	GK	Daciana Hosu	16 January 1998 (aged 23)	1.82 m	9	0	(Romania) SCM Râmnicu Vâlcea

== Group D ==
=== Netherlands ===
A 21-player squad was announced on 8 November 2021. It was cut to 18 on 28 November 2021.

Head coach: Monique Tijsterman

No.	Pos.	Name	Date of birth (age)	Height	App.	Goals	Club
6	RB	Laura van der Heijden	27 June 1990 (aged 31)	1.72 m	233	710	(Germany) Borussia Dortmund
7	RW	Debbie Bont	9 December 1990 (aged 30)	1.75 m	190	375	(France) Metz Handball
8	LB	Lois Abbingh	13 August 1992 (aged 29)	1.77 m	172	782	(Denmark) Odense Håndbold
9	CB	Larissa Nüsser	8 February 2000 (aged 21)	1.75 m	38	40	(Denmark) København Håndbold
10	P	Danick Snelder	22 May 1990 (aged 31)	1.78 m	194	467	(Germany) SG BBM Bietigheim
11	CB	Lynn Knippenborg	7 January 1992 (aged 29)	1.75 m	104	128	(Germany) Neckarsulmer SU
12	LW	Bo van Wetering	5 October 1999 (aged 22)	1.72 m	38	98	(Denmark) Odense Håndbold
18	LB	Kelly Dulfer	21 March 1994 (aged 27)	1.85 m	132	180	(Germany) SG BBM Bietigheim
19	P	Merel Freriks	6 January 1998 (aged 23)	1.75 m	51	63	(Germany) Borussia Dortmund
20	LB	Inger Smits	17 September 1994 (aged 27)	1.79 m	49	71	(Germany) SG BBM Bietigheim
22	LW	Zoë Sprengers	19 January 2000 (aged 21)	1.66 m	6	8	(Germany) Bayer 04 Leverkusen
26	RW	Angela Malestein	31 January 1993 (aged 28)	1.70 m	166	392	(Hungary) FTC Rail-Cargo Hungaria
31	RW	Kelly Vollebregt	1 January 1995 (aged 26)	1.67 m	9	13	(Denmark) Odense Håndbold
33	GK	Tess Wester	19 May 1993 (aged 28)	1.78 m	129	10	(Romania) CSM București
38	GK	Yara ten Holte	23 November 1999 (aged 22)	1.75 m	3	0	(Germany) Borussia Dortmund
48	RB	Dione Housheer	26 September 1999 (aged 22)	1.80 m	42	91	(Denmark) Odense Håndbold
79	CB	Estavana Polman	5 August 1992 (aged 29)	1.73 m	134	488	(Denmark) Team Esbjerg

=== Puerto Rico ===
Head coach: Camilo Estevez

No.	Pos.	Name	Date of birth (age)	Height	App.	Goals	Club
1	GK	Kitsa Escobar	1 December 1990 (aged 31)	1.58 m	30	2
2	RB	Adriana Cabrera	23 November 1992 (aged 29)	1.71 m	35	63
5	CB	Nathalys Ceballos	10 March 1990 (aged 31)	1.52 m	60	150
6	CB	Sheila Hiraldo	21 April 1989 (aged 32)	1.58 m	75	180
8	LW	Joane Vergara	25 August 1990 (aged 31)	1.58 m	29	42
11	LW	Alanis Benítez	28 October 1997 (aged 24)	1.58 m	10	5
12	GK	Roxanalis Carrasquillo	21 October 1990 (aged 31)	1.60 m	20	2
13	LB	Cyolimar Ortíz	10 August 2004 (aged 17)	1.64 m	4	5
15	RW	Jailene Maldonado	15 February 1995 (aged 26)	1.76 m	42	115
16	GK	Zugeily Soto	10 September 1996 (aged 25)	1.78 m	21	1
17	RB	Ericka Graciani	4 April 1996 (aged 25)	1.68 m	29	64
18	P	Ciris García	9 January 1991 (aged 30)	1.77 m	75	124
21	LB	Nastasha Escobar	30 April 2003 (aged 18)	1.76 m	5	10
22	LW	Zuleika Fuentes	29 June 1993 (aged 28)	1.58 m	50	96
23	P	Lizabeth Rodríguez	17 November 1992 (aged 29)	1.64 m	15	18
24	LW	Robeliz Ortíz	12 January 1995 (aged 26)	1.58 m	2	4

=== Sweden ===
The squad was announced on 3 November 2021. On 22 November, Evelina Källhage replaced Mathilda Lundström due to an injury. On 30 November, it was announced Daniela de Jong and Olivia Mellegård were added to the squad. On 9 December, Evelina Eriksson replaced Martina Thörn due to an injury.

Head coach: Tomas Axnér

No.	Pos.	Name	Date of birth (age)	Height	App.	Goals	Club
1	GK	Johanna Bundsen	3 June 1991 (aged 30)	1.85 m	106	1	(Denmark) København Håndbold
2	LW	Clara Lerby	8 May 1999 (aged 22)	1.72 m	4	4	(Sweden) Lugi HF
4	LW	Olivia Mellegård	17 June 1996 (aged 25)	1.77 m	61	128	(Denmark) København Håndbold
6	CB	Carin Strömberg	10 July 1993 (aged 28)	1.84 m	115	178	(France) Neptunes de Nantes
7	P	Linn Blohm	20 May 1992 (aged 29)	1.80 m	123	338	(Hungary) Győri Audi ETO KC
8	LB	Jamina Roberts	28 May 1990 (aged 31)	1.76 m	188	429	(Sweden) IK Sävehof
9	LB	Melissa Petrén	18 January 1995 (aged 26)	1.73 m	41	84	(Denmark) København Håndbold
16	GK	Jessica Ryde	18 May 1994 (aged 27)	1.85 m	35	0	(Denmark) Herning-Ikast Håndbold
17	RB	Nina Dano	12 June 2000 (aged 21)	1.72 m	19	29	(Denmark) HH Elite
19	P	Anna Lagerquist	16 October 1993 (aged 28)	1.75 m	81	111	(Russia) Rostov-Don
21	GK	Evelina Eriksson	20 August 1996 (aged 25)	1.84 m	2	0	(Norway) Vipers Kristiansand
23	CB	Emma Lindqvist	17 September 1997 (aged 24)	1.77 m	44	78	(Denmark) Herning-Ikast Håndbold
24	RW	Nathalie Hagman	19 July 1991 (aged 30)	1.67 m	176	551	(France) Neptunes de Nantes
30	GK	Martina Thörn	21 February 1991 (aged 30)	1.78 m	28	0	(Denmark) Odense Håndbold
38	LW	Elin Hansson	7 August 1996 (aged 25)	1.73 m	29	62	(Sweden) Skuru IK
39	RW	Evelina Källhage	20 April 1997 (aged 24)	1.70 m	8	15	(Sweden) Önnereds HK
40	P	Vilma Matthijs Holmberg	25 February 1999 (aged 22)	1.73 m	7	0	(Sweden) Skuru IK
42	CB	Jenny Carlson	17 April 1995 (aged 26)	1.72 m	15	41	(Denmark) Holstebro Håndbold
44	CB	Daniela de Jong	1 September 1998 (aged 23)	1.77 m	3	2	(Sweden) Skuru IK

=== Uzbekistan ===
Head coach: Zafar Azimov

No.	Pos.	Name	Date of birth (age)	Height	App.	Goals	Club
1	GK	Sarvinoz Sultonova	2 March 1998 (aged 23)	1.78 m	12	20
2	CB	Madina Khudoykulova	26 December 2001 (aged 19)	1.58 m	8	200
3	LW	Mekhriniso Mukhamadova	27 May 2001 (aged 20)	1.65 m	8	40
4	RB	Khusniya Safarova	1 January 1999 (aged 22)	1.70 m	5	25
5	P	Zukhra Botirova	20 July 2002 (aged 19)	1.68 m	4	16
6	CB	Zilola Mirzaeva	21 April 2002 (aged 19)	1.57 m	9	64
7	P	Nargiza Yusupova	12 July 2000 (aged 21)	1.75 m	6	35
8	RB	Anastasiya Mustafaeva	23 October 1986 (aged 35)	1.67 m	16	200
9	LB	Zakhro Allayarova	27 July 1997 (aged 24)	1.57 m	12	100
10	CB	Dilnoza Sultanova	23 April 2001 (aged 20)	1.70 m	7	35
11	CB	Sevara Razakbergenova	26 March 1998 (aged 23)	1.72 m	10	60
12	GK	Tuoryim Mamirova	3 September 2002 (aged 19)	1.76 m	3	15
13	LB	Charos Obidjonova	13 November 2002 (aged 19)	1.68 m	6	25
14	CB	Dilbarhon Bahromova	6 October 1993 (aged 28)	1.63 m	20	400
15	LB	Oyazimkhon Abdumannonova	12 January 2000 (aged 21)	1.66 m	12	192
17	RB	Maftunakhon Vosiljonova	1 January 2000 (aged 21)	1.59 m	10	60

== Group E ==
=== Czech Republic ===
A 21-player squad was announced on 12 November 2021. The squad was cut down to 18 players on 30 November 2021.

Head coach: Jan Bašný

No.	Pos.	Name	Date of birth (age)	Height	App.	Goals	Club
1	GK	Karin Řezáčová	25 October 2001 (aged 20)	1.77 m	4	0	(Czech Republic) DHC Plzeň
3	RW	Jana Knedlíková	22 June 1989 (aged 32)	1.68 m	112	239	(Norway) Vipers Kristiansand
13	RB	Silvie Polášková	13 January 1998 (aged 23)	1.76 m	9	16	(Czech Republic) DHC Sokol Poruba
14	LB	Kamila Kordovská	4 December 1997 (aged 23)	1.79 m	62	132	(Germany) HSG Blomberg-Lippe
20	P	Veronika Andrýsková	24 May 1997 (aged 24)	1.92 m	12	4	(Czech Republic) DHK Baník Most
21	CB	Veronika Mikulášková	16 October 2000 (aged 21)	1.71 m	13	6	(Czech Republic) DHK Baník Most
22	RB	Markéta Hurychová	9 April 1997 (aged 24)	1.74 m	16	19	(France) Saint-Amand Handball
29	LW	Adéla Stříšková	14 December 2000 (aged 20)	1.59 m	3	2	(Czech Republic) DHK Baník Most
33	GK	Petra Kudláčková	17 October 1994 (aged 27)	1.73 m	46	1	(France) Jeanne d'Arc Dijon Handball
34	CB	Julie Franková	4 October 2000 (aged 21)	1.79 m	4	1	(Czech Republic) DHC Slavia Praha
44	RW	Dominika Zachová	4 June 1996 (aged 25)	1.75 m	38	59	(Germany) Thüringer HC
48	RB	Sára Kovářová	9 February 1999 (aged 22)	1.74 m	19	40	(Turkey) Kastamonu Belediyesi
51	LB	Markéta Jeřábková	8 February 1996 (aged 25)	1.74 m	66	283	(Norway) Vipers Kristiansand
67	LW	Veronika Malá	6 May 1994 (aged 27)	1.70 m	73	202	(Germany) SG BBM Bietigheim
72	GK	Michaela Malá	12 January 2003 (aged 18)	1.76 m	0	0	(Czech Republic) DHC Plzeň
75	P	Michaela Holanová	4 February 1990 (aged 31)	1.74 m	17	23	(Czech Republic) DHK Baník Most
77	LB	Magda Kašpárková	26 October 1997 (aged 24)	1.75 m	2	0	(Czech Republic) DHK Zora Olomouc
96	LB	Charlotte Cholevová	29 July 2002 (aged 19)	1.73 m	0	0	(Czech Republic) DHK Baník Most

=== Germany ===
The squad was announced on 15 November 2021.

Head coach: (Netherlands) Henk Groener

No.	Pos.	Name	Date of birth (age)	Height	App.	Goals	Club
2	RB	Marlene Kalf	6 January 1990 (aged 31)	1.70 m	93	210	(Germany) TuS Metzingen
3	RW	Amelie Berger	22 July 1999 (aged 22)	1.69 m	35	69	(Germany) Borussia Dortmund
4	CB	Alina Grijseels	12 April 1996 (aged 25)	1.74 m	40	59	(Germany) Borussia Dortmund
7	P	Meike Schmelzer	19 July 1993 (aged 28)	1.80 m	64	76	(Romania) Gloria Bistrița-Năsăud
9	P	Lisa Antl	21 June 2000 (aged 21)	1.72 m	0	0	(Germany) Buxtehuder SV
11	LB	Xenia Smits	22 April 1994 (aged 27)	1.82 m	70	162	(Germany) SG BBM Bietigheim
12	GK	Dinah Eckerle	16 October 1995 (aged 26)	1.74 m	65	3	(Denmark) Team Esbjerg
13	CB	Silje Brøns Petersen	5 December 1994 (aged 26)	1.73 m	1	1	(Germany) TuS Metzingen
17	RB	Alicia Stolle	17 June 1996 (aged 25)	1.82 m	59	128	(Hungary) Ferencvárosi TC
18	CB	Mia Zschocke	28 May 1998 (aged 23)	1.78 m	32	19	(Germany) Borussia Dortmund
20	LB	Emily Bölk	26 April 1998 (aged 23)	1.82 m	65	193	(Hungary) Ferencvárosi TC
25	LB	Lena Degenhardt	31 May 1999 (aged 22)	1.78 m	2	3	(Germany) TuS Metzingen
27	RB	Julia Maidhof	13 March 1998 (aged 23)	1.76 m	15	54	(Germany) SG BBM Bietigheim
29	LW	Antje Lauenroth	3 October 1988 (aged 33)	1.70 m	38	80	(Germany) SG BBM Bietigheim
33	P	Luisa Schulze	14 September 1990 (aged 31)	1.90 m	108	133	(Germany) SG BBM Bietigheim
42	GK	Katharina Filter	4 February 1999 (aged 22)	1.81 m	5	1	(Germany) Buxtehuder SV
95	LW	Johanna Stockschläder	11 February 1995 (aged 26)	1.71 m	4	14	(Germany) Neckarsulmer SU

=== Hungary ===
A 21-player squad was announced on 10 November 2021. It was cut to 20 on 17 November 2021 and again to 18 on 25 November 2021.

Head coach: Vladimir Golovin

No.	Pos.	Name	Date of birth (age)	Height	App.	Goals	Club
2	CB	Eszter Tóth	27 October 1992 (aged 29)	1.80 m	3	5	(Hungary) Mosonmagyaróvár
4	P	Petra Tóvizi	15 March 1999 (aged 22)	1.78 m	34	41	(Hungary) Debrecen
11	RB	Anna Albek	2 December 2001 (aged 19)	1.89 m	0	0	(Germany) TuS Metzingen
12	GK	Melinda Szikora	19 November 1988 (aged 33)	1.75 m	20	0	(Germany) Bietigheim
16	GK	Blanka Bíró	22 September 1994 (aged 27)	1.87 m	92	2	(Hungary) Ferencváros
18	RW	Anett Kovács	12 November 1994 (aged 27)	1.68 m	4	4	(Hungary) Ferencváros
19	LW	Gréta Márton	3 October 1999 (aged 22)	1.73 m	35	78	(Hungary) Ferencváros
21	RB	Szimonetta Planéta	12 December 1993 (aged 27)	1.98 m	53	70	(Hungary) Debrecen
23	LW	Csenge Fodor	23 April 1999 (aged 22)	1.72 m	0	0	(Hungary) Győr
30	GK	Zsófi Szemerey	2 June 1994 (aged 27)	1.83 m	0	0	(Hungary) Mosonmagyaróvár
38	CB	Petra Vámos	14 September 2000 (aged 21)	1.75 m	19	41	(Hungary) Debrecen
42	RB	Katrin Klujber	21 April 1999 (aged 22)	1.70 m	37	172	(Hungary) Ferencváros
44	LB	Gréta Kácsor	24 April 2000 (aged 21)	1.75 m	8	9	(Hungary) Vác
45	LB	Noémi Háfra	5 October 1998 (aged 23)	1.80 m	63	160	(Hungary) Győr
58	P	Réka Bordás	26 August 1997 (aged 24)	1.84 m	6	7	(Hungary) Debrecen
66	RW	Viktória Lukács	31 October 1995 (aged 26)	1.68 m	76	197	(Hungary) Győr
68	P	Laura Szabó	19 November 1997 (aged 24)	1.85 m	26	43	(Hungary) MTK Budapest
90	LB	Szandra Szöllösi-Zácsik	22 April 1990 (aged 31)	1.83 m	78	261	(Hungary) Ferencváros

=== Slovakia ===
A 20-player squad was announced on 16 November 2021. The official squad was announced 30 November 2021.

Head coach: Pavol Streicher

No.	Pos.	Name	Date of birth (age)	Height	App.	Goals	Club
5	LB	Marianna Rebičová	15 August 1993 (aged 28)	1.79 m	51	40	(Slovakia) IUVENTA Michalovce
6	LW	Martina Popovcová	12 September 2000 (aged 21)	1.72 m	10	25	(Slovakia) IUVENTA Michalovce
10	RW	Katarína Pócsíková	3 May 1993 (aged 28)	1.71 m	22	21	(Slovakia) HK Slovan Duslo Šaľa
11	RB	Barbora Lancz	28 July 2002 (aged 19)	1.72 m	9	20	(Hungary) Mosonmagyaróvári KC SE
15	LB	Anette Hudáková	25 March 1998 (aged 23)	1.81 m	7	1	(Hungary) Alba Regia-KSE
17	CB	Vladimíra Bajčiová	24 June 1998 (aged 23)	1.70 m	10	0	(Slovakia) IUVENTA Michalovce
19	CB	Adriána Holejová	11 February 1999 (aged 22)	1.72 m	0	0	(Slovakia) IUVENTA Michalovce
21	LB	Simona Szarková	2 January 1992 (aged 29)	1.74 m	68	232	(Hungary) Siófok KC
27	LB	Natália Némethová	2 December 1999 (aged 21)	1.80 m	7	10	(Slovakia) HC DAC Dunajská Streda
31	P	Nikoleta Trúnková	23 September 1998 (aged 23)	1.85 m	21	36	(Slovakia) IUVENTA Michalovce
32	P	Valéria Dulinová	8 February 2003 (aged 18)	1.78 m	4	1	(Slovakia) IUVENTA Michalovce
37	RB	Bibiana Štefaniková	7 December 1998 (aged 22)	1.80 m	2	0	(Slovakia) IUVENTA Michalovce
39	LW	Mónika Pénzes	25 November 2003 (aged 18)	1.68 m	2	3	(Slovakia) HC DAC Dunajská Streda
42	RB	Karin Bujnochová	1 November 1994 (aged 27)	1.80 m	31	42	(France) Achenheim Truchtersheim Handball
44	CB	Boglárka Bízik	22 September 1989 (aged 32)	1.72 m	4	0	(Slovakia) HC DAC Dunajská Streda
66	GK	Adriana Medveďová	11 July 1992 (aged 29)	1.82 m	59	1	(Austria) Handballclub Fivers Margareten
71	GK	Alexandra Ivanicja	14 August 1993 (aged 28)	1.78 m	0	0	(Poland) AZS Politechnika Koszalin
90	GK	Viktória Oguntoyová	24 December 1990 (aged 30)	1.81 m	20	0	(Slovakia) HC DAC Dunajská Streda
91	LW	Réka Bíziková	21 December 1991 (aged 29)	1.68 m	42	77	(Slovakia) HC DAC Dunajská Streda

== Group F ==
=== Congo ===
A 21-player squad was announced on 14 November 2021.

Head coach: Younes Tatby

No.	Pos.	Name	Date of birth (age)	Height	App.	Goals	Club
1	GK	Ruth Kodia	13 January 1992 (aged 29)	1.73 m	7	0	(Republic of the Congo) DGSP
5	LW	Kimberley Rutil	5 August 1996 (aged 25)	1.80 m	0	0	(France) Stella Saint-Maur Handball
6	LW	Klenn Divoko	21 June 1993 (aged 28)	1.79 m	9	11	(Republic of the Congo) CARA Brazzaville
7	RW	Diane Yimga	27 April 1992 (aged 29)	1.83 m	8	10	(France) Reims Champagne HB
10	RB	Mercianne Hendo	19 January 1997 (aged 24)	1.72 m	6	7	(Republic of the Congo) DGSP
13	LB	Belvina Mouyamba	25 September 1996 (aged 25)	1.64 m	9	15	(Republic of the Congo) CARA Brazzaville
15	CB	Avelle Ntondele	30 August 1998 (aged 23)	1.66 m	10	7	(Republic of the Congo) Étoile du Congo
16	GK	Magalie Bazekene	11 December 1992 (aged 28)	1.78 m	11	0	(Republic of the Congo) CARA Brazzaville
17	P	Richca Obangue	2 September 1994 (aged 27)	1.75 m	8	4	(Republic of the Congo) DGSP
18	CB	Patience Okabande	18 May 1995 (aged 26)	1.68 m	7	6	(France) Blanzat Sport Montluçon Handball
23	RW	Betchaïdelle Ngombele	23 April 2004 (aged 17)	1.90 m	9	11	(Republic of the Congo) CARA Brazzaville
45	LW	Joséphine Nkou	18 September 1997 (aged 24)	1.65 m	8	12	(France) Paris 92
78	CB	Fanta Diagouraga	30 June 2000 (aged 21)	1.75 m	0	0	(France) Noisy-le-Grand handball
79	P	Sharon Dorson	9 March 1994 (aged 27)	1.78 m	8	7	(France) Le Havre
81	P	Rita Saraiva	21 November 1992 (aged 29)	1.77 m	8	6	(France) US Cagnes Handball
99	LW	Kassandra Jappont	21 October 1994 (aged 27)	1.78 m	5	7	(France) Bergerac Périgord Pourpre Handball

=== Denmark ===
The squad was announced on 2 November 2021. On 3 December 2021, Michala Møller replaced Mia Rej in the squad due to a knee injury in the opening match.

Head coach: Jesper Jensen

No.	Pos.	Name	Date of birth (age)	Height	App.	Goals	Club
1	GK	Sandra Toft	18 October 1989 (aged 32)	1.74 m	142	1	(France) Brest Bretagne Handball
2	LW	Lærke Nolsøe	19 February 1996 (aged 25)	1.67 m	48	93	(Denmark) Viborg HK
8	LB	Anne Mette Hansen	25 August 1994 (aged 27)	1.82 m	115	318	(Hungary) Győri ETO KC
10	P	Kathrine Heindahl	26 March 1992 (aged 29)	1.82 m	91	171	(Russia) CSKA Moscow
11	LB	Line Haugsted	11 November 1994 (aged 27)	1.80 m	66	92	(Denmark) Viborg HK
12	GK	Anna Kristensen	25 October 2000 (aged 21)	1.83 m	10	0	(Denmark) Viborg HK
13	RW	Simone Böhme	17 August 1991 (aged 30)	1.69 m	39	49	(Hungary) Siófok KC
16	GK	Althea Reinhardt	1 September 1996 (aged 25)	1.80 m	68	0	(Denmark) Odense Håndbold
18	RB	Mette Tranborg	1 January 1996 (aged 25)	1.92 m	75	192	(Denmark) Team Esbjerg
23	LB	Kristina Jørgensen	17 January 1998 (aged 23)	1.87 m	60	116	(Denmark) Viborg HK
24	CB	Mia Rej	2 February 1990 (aged 31)	1.68 m	35	85	(Denmark) Odense Håndbold
25	RW	Trine Østergaard	17 October 1991 (aged 30)	1.66 m	136	249	(Germany) SG BBM Bietigheim
27	RB	Louise Burgaard	17 October 1992 (aged 29)	1.76 m	126	258	(France) Metz Handball
31	CB	Simone Petersen	28 August 1997 (aged 24)	1.75 m	6	5	(Denmark) Herning-Ikast Håndbold
32	LB	Mie Højlund	24 October 1997 (aged 24)	1.80 m	52	84	(Denmark) Odense Håndbold
33	LW	Emma Friis	31 October 1999 (aged 22)	1.62 m	9	21	(Denmark) Herning-Ikast Håndbold
34	P	Rikke Iversen	18 May 1993 (aged 28)	1.78 m	28	29	(Denmark) Odense Håndbold
42	LB	Michala Møller	16 February 2000 (aged 21)	1.78 m	0	0	(Denmark) Team Esbjerg

=== South Korea ===
Head coach: Jang In-ik

No.	Pos.	Name	Date of birth (age)	Height	App.	Goals	Club
1	GK	Oh Sa-ra	26 November 1992 (aged 29)	1.73 m	12	3	(South Korea) Busan
6	RW	Song Ji-young	5 May 1995 (aged 26)	1.64 m	7	12	(South Korea) Seoul City
7	LW	Shin Eun-joo	9 September 1993 (aged 28)	1.70 m	8	14	(South Korea) Incheon City
8	P	Lee Han-sol	23 August 1995 (aged 26)	1.80 m	4	9	(South Korea) SK Sugar Gliders
9	CB	Song Hye-soo	27 August 1999 (aged 22)	1.63 m	8	12	(South Korea) Korea National Sport University
11	RB	Ryu Eun-hee	24 February 1990 (aged 31)	1.79 m	83	297	(Hungary) Győri Audi ETO KC
12	GK	Jeong Jin-hui	24 March 1999 (aged 22)	1.80 m	11	0	(South Korea) Korea National Sport University
13	RW	Kim Yun-ji	16 January 2000 (aged 21)	1.70 m	3	1	(South Korea) Wonderful Samcheok
17	LB	Jo Su-yeon	6 June 1994 (aged 27)	1.72 m	13	11	(South Korea) SK Sugar Gliders
19	CB	Oh Ye-dam	8 May 2000 (aged 21)	1.62 m	3	7	(South Korea) Incheon City
21	LW	Jo Ha-rang	15 July 1991 (aged 30)	1.65 m	15	30	(South Korea) Colorful Daegu
22	RB	Jeong Hyun-hui	9 December 2001 (aged 19)	1.74 m	5	9	(South Korea) Gwangji City
23	CB	Lee Mi-gyeong	2 October 1991 (aged 30)	1.70 m	39	57	(Japan) Omron
24	P	Kim So-ra	23 March 1998 (aged 23)	1.80 m	10	13	(South Korea) Gyeongnam
27	LB	Kim Jin-yi	20 June 1993 (aged 28)	1.80 m	26	43	(South Korea) Busan
29	RW	Shin Da-rae	14 June 1999 (aged 22)	1.70 m	0	0	(South Korea) Incheon City
34	RW	Jung Ji-in	18 July 2000 (aged 21)	1.80 m	8	15	(South Korea) Korea National Sports University

=== Tunisia ===
A 17-player squad was announced on 4 October 2021.

Head coach: Moez Ben Amor

No.	Pos.	Name	Date of birth (age)	Height	App.	Goals	Club
5	RW	Aya Ben Abdallah	19 August 1997 (aged 24)	1.68 m	17	20	(France) Handball Octeville-sur-Mer
7	LW	Fatma Bouri	9 January 1993 (aged 28)	1.79 m	23	27	(Tunisia) Club Africain
9	P	Ons Yaakoub	13 November 2002 (aged 19)	1.81 m	7	9	(Tunisia) Ezzahra Sport Handball
10	RB	Amal Hamrouni	16 June 1995 (aged 26)	1.56 m	38	171	(France) La Roche-sur-Yon Vendée handball
11	LW	Boutheïna Amiche	12 September 1990 (aged 31)	1.73 m	40	59	(Tunisia) Ezzahra Sport Handball
14	P	Mouna Jlezi	22 June 1991 (aged 30)	1.73 m	30	57	(Romania) HC Zalău
15	P	Rakia Rezgui	26 August 1996 (aged 25)	1.81 m	38	69	(France) Stella Saint-Maur Handball
16	GK	Fadia Omrani	27 February 1984 (aged 37)	1.72 m	79	1	(Tunisia) Club Africain
17	LB	Chayma Jouini	2 July 1996 (aged 25)	1.73 m	17	52	(France) Bergerac Périgord Pourpre Handball
21	CB	Sondes Hachana	7 September 1996 (aged 25)	1.72 m	31	64	(Egypt) Al Ahly
29	CB	Eya Masri	29 May 2000 (aged 21)	1.68 m	13	31	(Tunisia) Club Africain
32	RW	Nada Zalfani	11 November 2000 (aged 21)	1.73 m	13	59	(Tunisia) Étoile Sportive du Sahel
33	GK	Roua Mokaddem	9 April 2000 (aged 21)	1.78 m	7	0	(Tunisia) Menzah Sports
88	CB	Fadwa Aouji	23 February 2001 (aged 20)	1.71 m	18	81	(Tunisia) Ezzahra Sport Handball
96	RB	Oumayma Dardour	6 January 1996 (aged 25)	1.75 m	31	23	(France) Rouen Handball
98	CB	Samia Belhadj	30 September 1998 (aged 23)	1.71 m	12	32	(Tunisia) Espoir sportif de Rejiche

== Group G ==
=== Brazil ===
A 18-player squad was announced on 22 October 2021.

Head coach: Cristiano Silva

No.	Pos.	Name	Date of birth (age)	Height	App.	Goals	Club
2	RB	Bruna de Paula	26 September 1996 (aged 25)	1.70 m	65	181	(France) Metz Handball
6	LB	Mariane Fernándes	4 January 1996 (aged 25)	1.65 m	7	12	(Spain) BM Bera Bera
7	P	Tamires Morena Lima	16 May 1994 (aged 27)	1.83 m	117	169	(Romania) Dunărea Brăila
9	CB	Ana Paula Belo	18 October 1987 (aged 34)	1.72 m	203	736	(Romania) Dunărea Brăila
10	RW	Jessica Quintino	17 April 1991 (aged 30)	1.76 m	125	321	(Romania) Dunărea Brăila
12	GK	Bárbara Arenhart	4 October 1986 (aged 35)	1.81 m	175	12	(Slovenia) RK Krim
13	LB	Talita Alves Carneiro	17 October 1996 (aged 25)	1.76 m	5	9	(Spain) CBF Málaga Costa del Sol
15	CB	Francielle da Rocha	10 June 1992 (aged 29)	1.66 m	75	100	(Romania) Dunărea Brăila
20	LW	Larissa Araújo	1 July 1992 (aged 29)	1.67 m	65	134	(Romania) Dunărea Brăila
21	RW	Adriana Cardoso de Castro	29 October 1990 (aged 31)	1.67 m	45	132	(France) Metz Handball
22	LB	Samara Vieira	7 October 1991 (aged 30)	1.83 m	32	69	(Romania) Dunărea Brăila
23	RB	Giulia Guarieiro	24 July 1995 (aged 26)	1.74 m	15	11	(Spain) BM Granollers
26	LW	Thais Fermo	11 June 1996 (aged 25)	1.74 m	8	12	(Spain) BM Porriño
49	CB	Patrícia Matieli	8 November 1988 (aged 33)	1.68 m	60	65	(Poland) MKS Zagłębie Lubin
87	GK	Renata Arruda	18 February 1999 (aged 22)	1.78 m	35	5	(Romania) Măgura Cisnădie
91	P	Lívia Ventura	18 January 1987 (aged 34)	1.70 m	25	26	(Portugal) Madeira Andebol SAD

=== Croatia ===
A 19-player squad was announced on 9 November 2021. It was cut to 18 on 22 November 2021 and again to 16 on 28 November 2021.

Head coach: Nenad Šoštarić

No.	Pos.	Name	Date of birth (age)	Height	App.	Goals	Club
1	GK	Lucija Bešen	29 March 1998 (aged 23)	1.80 m	15	0	(Croatia) RK Lokomotiva Zagreb
3	LW	Paula Posavec	26 August 1996 (aged 25)	1.70 m	49	61	(Slovenia) RK Krim
7	CB	Dora Krsnik	19 January 1992 (aged 29)	1.70 m	42	84	(France) HB Plan de Cuques
8	CB	Stela Posavec	26 August 1996 (aged 25)	1.65 m	37	61	(Croatia) RK Lokomotiva Zagreb
9	LB	Ćamila Mičijević	8 September 1994 (aged 27)	1.95 m	45	135	(France) Metz Handball
12	GK	Ivana Kapitanović	17 September 1994 (aged 27)	1.83 m	38	6	(France) Metz Handball
14	LB	Larissa Kalaus	24 June 1996 (aged 25)	1.73 m	25	78	(Croatia) RK Podravka Koprivnica
17	P	Katarina Ježić	19 December 1992 (aged 28)	1.73 m	83	170	(Hungary) Siófok KC
25	LW	Lara Burić	13 August 2003 (aged 18)	1.69 m	0	0	(Croatia) RK Lokomotiva Zagreb
28	LW	Andrea Šimara	13 July 1997 (aged 24)	1.70 m	12	13	(Croatia) RK Lokomotiva Zagreb
30	LB	Ivana Dežić	27 July 1994 (aged 27)	1.78 m	13	28	(Croatia) ŽRK Koka Varaždin
31	P	Ana Debelić	9 January 1994 (aged 27)	1.82 m	45	74	(Norway) Vipers Kristiansand
33	RW	Ana Turk	29 June 1989 (aged 32)	1.69 m	28	46	(Croatia) RK Podravka Koprivnica
35	LW	Josipa Mamić	7 January 1996 (aged 25)	1.65 m	8	12	(Croatia) RK Lokomotiva Zagreb
40	LB	Tena Petika	16 June 2000 (aged 21)	1.90 m	0	0	(Croatia) RK Lokomotiva Zagreb
41	RB	Gabriela Gudelj	9 August 1997 (aged 24)	1.75 m	0	0	(Croatia) ŽRK Zrinski Čakovec
77	CB	Valentina Blažević	14 February 1994 (aged 27)	1.70 m	42	170	(Romania) Măgura Cisnădie
91	GK	Tea Pijević	18 November 1991 (aged 30)	1.72 m	35	1	(Hungary) Alba Fehérvár KC

=== Japan ===
A 20-player squad was announced 4 November 2021.

Head coach: Shigeo Kusumoto

No.	Pos.	Name	Date of birth (age)	Height	App.	Goals	Club
2	P	Mika Nagata	28 May 1994 (aged 27)	1.80 m	43	18	(Japan) Hokkoku Bank
7	RW	Asuka Fujita	14 February 1996 (aged 25)	1.66 m	55	149	(Romania) CS Minaur Baia Mare
17	P	Clare Gray	3 June 1997 (aged 24)	1.71 m	0	0	(Japan) Omron
20	RW	Natsumi Akiyama	23 July 1994 (aged 27)	1.62 m	33	89	(Japan) Hokkoku Bank
25	CB	Mana Ohyama	7 December 1992 (aged 28)	1.64 m	58	127	(Hungary) Alba Fehérvár KC
26	CB	Natsuki Aizawa	6 January 1999 (aged 22)	1.60 m	0	0	(Japan) Hokkoku Bank
30	GK	Sakura Hauge	7 January 1987 (aged 34)	1.74 m	62	8	(France) ESBF Besançon
32	LW	Hikaru Matsumoro	25 February 1995 (aged 26)	1.67 m	0	0	(Japan) Hokkoku Bank
33	RB	Ikumi Iwabuchi	14 December 1995 (aged 25)	1.70 m	8	20	(Japan) Omron
34	CB	Maharu Kondo	24 January 1996 (aged 25)	1.58 m	7	17	(Japan) Izumi Maple Reds
36	RB	Kaho Nakayama	23 October 1998 (aged 23)	1.72 m	5	6	(Japan) Hokkoku Bank
42	LB	Mana Yamamoto	22 March 1997 (aged 24)	1.75 m	7	24	(Japan) HC Nagoya
44	LB	Yumi Kitahara	8 July 1995 (aged 26)	1.71 m	3	3	(Japan) Sony Semiconductor
45	GK	Abinaomi Osawa	31 July 1997 (aged 24)	1.70 m	0	0	(Japan) Sony Semiconductor
46	GK	Atsuko Baba	13 June 1995 (aged 26)	1.64 m	0	0	(Japan) Hokkoku Bank
47	P	Naoko Sahara	18 January 1996 (aged 25)	1.80 m	0	0	(Japan) Hokkoku Bank
48	RW	Saki Hattori	22 December 1996 (aged 24)	1.60 m	0	0	(Japan) Sony Semiconductor
49	LW	Yuki Yoshidome	2 August 1998 (aged 23)	1.64 m	0	0	(Japan) Hokkoku Bank
50	LB	Shizuka Akiyama	5 December 1997 (aged 23)	1.74 m	0	0	(Japan) Izumi Maple Reds
51	LB	Ayaka Ohmatsuzawa	7 August 1998 (aged 23)	1.73 m	0	0	(Japan) Prestige International Aranamre

=== Paraguay ===
The squad was announced 17 November 2021.

Head coach: Neri Vera

No.	Pos.	Name	Date of birth (age)	Height	App.	Goals	Club
1	GK	Alicia Villalba	28 February 1989 (aged 32)	1.72 m	150	3	(Paraguay) Handball Camargo
2	LW	Fátima Acuña	14 August 1999 (aged 22)	1.78 m	100	130	(Paraguay) Cerro Porteño
4	RB	Fernanda Insfrán	7 February 1998 (aged 23)	1.58 m	80	300	(Paraguay) Cerro Porteño
5	RB	Kamila Rolon	5 July 1994 (aged 27)	1.68 m	84	110	(Paraguay) San José Handball
6	P	Sabrina Fiore	17 April 1996 (aged 25)	1.76 m	130	165	(Brazil) UnC Concórdia
7	P	Karina dos Santos	1 April 1985 (aged 36)	1.82 m	150	70	(Paraguay) San José Handball
8	LB	Jessica Fleitas	22 August 1997 (aged 24)	1.63 m	80	100	(Paraguay) Cerro Porteño
9	CB	Marizza Faría	20 August 1983 (aged 38)	1.67 m	194	280	(Spain) Unicaja Banco Gijón
10	P	Gisela González	16 April 1997 (aged 24)	1.71 m	70	80	(Paraguay) Cerro Porteño
11	CB	Delyne Leiva	27 March 1998 (aged 23)	1.59 m	80	110	(Paraguay) Cerro Porteño
12	GK	Fátima Ocampos	3 January 2003 (aged 18)	1.80 m	15	2	(Spain) Balonmano Base Oviedo
13	RW	Sofía Villalba	3 January 2003 (aged 18)	1.74 m	20	30	(Paraguay) Cerro Porteño
14	LB	María Paula Fernández	30 August 1998 (aged 23)	1.54 m	80	130	(Spain) Balonmano Base Oviedo
19	P	Nathalie Giménez	19 August 1992 (aged 29)	1.71 m	20	10	(Paraguay) Cerro Porteño
21	LB	Ada Miskinich	28 April 1995 (aged 26)	1.79 m	20	15	(Paraguay) Cerro Porteño
26	RW	Jazmín Mendoza	27 May 2002 (aged 19)	1.64 m	20	32	(Paraguay) Cerro Porteño

== Group H ==
=== Argentina ===
A 18-player squad was announced 1 November 2021.

Head coach: Eduardo Gallardo

No.	Pos.	Name	Date of birth (age)	Height	App.	Goals	Club
1	GK	Marisol Carratú	15 July 1986 (aged 35)	1.76 m	105	3	(Spain) CB Atlético Guardés
4	RW	Rosario Urban	13 March 1997 (aged 24)	1.67 m	56	101	(France) Jeanne d'Arc Dijon Handball
5	LB	Manuela Pizzo	13 November 1991 (aged 30)	1.78 m	145	357	(Sweden) Skara HF
6	RW	Ayelén García	13 December 1999 (aged 21)	1.66 m	16	22	(Argentina) River Plate
7	P	Rocío Campigli	6 August 1994 (aged 27)	1.70 m	65	143	(Spain) CBF Málaga
10	RB	Luciana Mendoza	14 March 1990 (aged 31)	1.70 m	178	581	(France) Achenheim Truchtersheim Handball
12	GK	Ayelén Rosalez	21 May 1995 (aged 26)	1.81 m	5	0	(Spain) BM Porriño
13	P	Giuliana Gavilan	7 March 1996 (aged 25)	1.76 m	37	49	(France) Handball Plan-de-Cuques
15	P	Antonela Mena	28 March 1988 (aged 33)	1.83 m	184	221	(Argentina) CID Moreno
16	GK	Leila Niño	23 October 1992 (aged 29)	1.67 m	31	2	(Argentina) Vélez Sarsfield
17	RB	Malena Cavo	2 April 1999 (aged 22)	1.69 m	21	57	(Spain) BM Bera Bera
18	CB	Macarena Sans	20 November 1996 (aged 25)	1.65 m	79	120	(Spain) CD Beti Onak
21	LB	Macarena Gandulfo	3 November 1993 (aged 28)	1.75 m	79	88	(France) Le Pouzin HB07 Handbal
22	LB	Elke Karsten	15 May 1995 (aged 26)	1.77 m	99	287	(Norway) Molde Elite
23	LW	Valentina Cisneros	10 November 1993 (aged 28)	1.63 m	7	7	(Argentina) CID Moreno
25	LB	Micaela Casasola	17 March 1997 (aged 24)	1.75 m	62	105	(Spain) BM Porriño
26	LW	Lucía Dalle	4 December 1998 (aged 22)	1.62 m	0	0	(Argentina) Estudiantes de La Plata
36	LB	Delfina Ojea	30 April 2003 (aged 18)	1.70 m	0	0	(Argentina) River Plate

=== Austria ===
The squad was announced on 10 November 2021.

Head coach: Herbert Müller

No.	Pos.	Name	Date of birth (age)	Height	App.	Goals	Club
1	GK	Lena Ivančok	29 March 2001 (aged 20)	1.75 m	10	0	(Croatia) RK Lokomotiva Zagreb
3	LB	Katarina Pandza	17 April 2002 (aged 19)	1.79 m	10	19	(Germany) TuS Metzingen
5	CB	Sonja Frey	22 April 1993 (aged 28)	1.69 m	96	468	(Denmark) Herning-Ikast Håndbold
6	LW	Mirela Dedic	15 December 1991 (aged 29)	1.69 m	68	105	(Austria) Hypo Niederösterreich
7	CB	Johanna Schindler	8 June 1994 (aged 27)	1.71 m	52	26	(Austria) Hypo Niederösterreich
9	CB	Patrícia Kovács	26 May 1996 (aged 25)	1.78 m	52	169	(Hungary) Mosonmagyaróvári KC SE
11	RW	Fabienne Tomasini	14 June 1997 (aged 24)	1.74 m	21	17	(Switzerland) LC Brühl
13	P	Sarah Draguljic	25 January 2000 (aged 21)	1.71 m	0	0	(Austria) Hypo Niederösterreich
15	RW	Claudia Wess	15 June 1995 (aged 26)	1.81 m	53	50	(Austria) Hypo Niederösterreich
16	GK	Petra Blazek	15 June 1987 (aged 34)	1.82 m	202	2	(Germany) Thüringer HC
17	LB	Johanna Reichert	31 December 2001 (aged 19)	1.78 m	8	27	(Germany) Thüringer HC
18	RB	Kristina Dramac	9 January 2002 (aged 19)	1.80 m	2	0	(Austria) WAT Atzgersdorf
22	P	Stefanie Kaiser	31 October 1992 (aged 29)	1.81 m	80	106	(Austria) Hypo Niederösterreich
23	RB	Klara Schlegel	7 May 2001 (aged 20)	1.83 m	13	25	(Germany) Frisch Auf Göppingen
27	GK	Anna Hajgató	27 April 1992 (aged 29)	1.70 m	2	0	(Austria) Hypo Niederösterreich
29	LB	Ines Ivančok	14 April 1998 (aged 23)	1.80 m	38	86	(Germany) HSG Bensheim/Auerbach
44	P	Nora Leitner	5 May 2002 (aged 19)	1.77 m	0	0	(Austria) Hypo Niederösterreich
48	LW	Nina Neidhart	16 June 2001 (aged 20)	1.72 m	20	51	(Austria) Hypo Niederösterreich
57	LB	Josefine Huber	19 February 1996 (aged 25)	1.80 m	49	124	(Germany) Thüringer HC

=== China ===
Head coach: (South Korea) Kim Gap-soo

No.	Pos.	Name	Date of birth (age)	Height	App.	Goals	Club
1	GK	Lu Chang	6 April 1998 (aged 23)	1.80 m	7	0	(China) Shandong Handball
3	RW	Zhang Haixia	10 February 1995 (aged 26)	1.74 m	97	197	(China) Jiangsu Handball
5	CB	Wang Jiayi	2 August 1999 (aged 22)	1.68 m	50	75	(China) Shanhai Handball
10	LB	Tian Xiuxiu	13 January 1996 (aged 25)	1.70 m	52	100	(China) Shandong Handball
11	LW	Yu Yuanyuan	30 January 1995 (aged 26)	1.73 m	57	112	(China) Jiangsu Handball
12	GK	Huang Xia	19 January 1995 (aged 26)	1.78 m	0	0	(China) Jiangsu Handball
14	LB	Zhou Mengxue	20 February 2000 (aged 21)	1.75 m	33	95	(China) Anhui Handball
18	RB	Liu Chan	10 August 1998 (aged 23)	1.80 m	96	141	(China) Shanghai Handball
19	P	Mo Mengmeng	6 January 1995 (aged 26)	1.80 m	42	19	(China) Jiangsu Handball
20	LB	Wang Keke	20 October 1999 (aged 22)	1.82 m	0	0	(China) Jiangsu Handball
23	LW	Qu Wenna	2 January 2002 (aged 19)	1.73 m	0	0	(China) Jiangsu Handball
27	P	Gong Lei	23 January 2000 (aged 21)	1.81 m	0	0	(China) Shandong Handball
32	P	Sun Jiao	7 November 1998 (aged 23)	1.75 m	0	0	(China) Jiangsu Handball
34	CB	Jin Mengqing	29 May 1995 (aged 26)	1.72 m	67	190	(China) Jiangsu Handball
43	LB	Wang Shuhui	12 June 1993 (aged 28)	1.79 m	4	0	(China) Jiangsu Handball
66	GK	Song Chenxi	26 January 2000 (aged 21)	1.80 m	0	0	(China) Jiangsu Handball

=== Spain ===
A 18-player squad was announced on 15 November 2021.

Head coach: José Ignacio Prades

No.	Pos.	Name	Date of birth (age)	Height	App.	Goals	Club
4	RW	Carmen Martín	29 May 1988 (aged 33)	1.69 m	238	820	(Romania) CSM București
6	LB	Carmen Campos	10 July 1995 (aged 26)	1.71 m	19	28	(France) Jeanne d'Arc Dijon Handball
8	CB	Silvia Arderíus	11 July 1990 (aged 31)	1.69 m	55	51	(Spain) CBF Málaga Costa del Sol
10	P	Elisabet Cesáreo	25 May 1999 (aged 22)	1.78 m	36	24	(Spain) BM Bera Bera
12	GK	Silvia Navarro	20 March 1979 (aged 42)	1.69 m	227	10	(Spain) BM Remudas
13	LW	Laura Hernández	13 May 1997 (aged 24)	1.70 m	4	6	(Spain) BM Bera Bera
16	GK	Mercedes Castellanos	21 July 1988 (aged 33)	1.84 m	51	1	(Spain) CBF Málaga Costa del Sol
17	LW	Jennifer Gutiérrez Bermejo	20 February 1995 (aged 26)	1.69 m	62	129	(Germany) Borussia Dortmund
18	RW	Maitane Etxeberria	15 January 1997 (aged 24)	1.69 m	38	58	(Spain) BM Bera Bera
27	LB	Lara González Ortega	22 February 1992 (aged 29)	1.85 m	138	149	(France) Paris 92
30	LW	Soledad López	4 April 1992 (aged 29)	1.62 m	48	112	(Spain) CBF Málaga Costa del Sol
33	P	Kaba Gassama	16 August 1997 (aged 24)	1.84 m	17	15	(France) Neptunes de Nantes
34	CB	Alicia Fernández	21 December 1992 (aged 28)	1.73 m	58	140	(Romania) SCM Râmnicu Vâlcea
39	RB	Almudena Rodríguez	9 November 1993 (aged 28)	1.75 m	79	152	(Romania) CS Gloria Bistrița-Năsăud
44	P	Ainhoa Hernández	27 April 1994 (aged 27)	1.80 m	101	147	(Romania) CS Rapid București
51	RB	Irene Espínola	19 December 1992 (aged 28)	1.83 m	13	6	(Germany) Neckarsulmer SU
62	RB	Paula Arcos	21 December 2001 (aged 19)	1.68 m	7	10	(Spain) CB Atlético Guardés
86	LB	Alexandrina Cabral	5 May 1986 (aged 35)	1.75 m	127	589	(Romania) CS Gloria Bistrița-Năsăud
99	RB	Mireya González	18 July 1991 (aged 30)	1.77 m	96	183	(Romania) SCM Râmnicu Vâlcea

== Statistics ==
=== Coaches representation by country ===
Coaches in bold represent their own country.

Rank	Country	Coaches
2	Netherlands	Henk Groener (Germany), **Monique Tijsterman**
2	South Korea	**Jang In-ik**, Gap Soo Kim (China)
2	Montenegro	**Bojana Popović**, Dragan Adžić (Slovenia)
1	Argentina	**Eduardo Gallardo**
1	Denmark	**Jesper Jensen**
1	Spain	**José Ignacio Prades**
1	France	**Olivier Krumbholz**
1	Germany	Herbert Müller (Austria)
1	Iceland	Thorir Hergeirsson (Norway)
1	Slovenia	Uroš Bregar (Serbia)
1	Morocco	**Younes Tatby**
1	Brazil	**Cristiano Silva**
1	Kazakhstan	**Lyazzat Ishanova**
1	Japan	**Shigeo Kusumoto**
1	Cameroon	**Serge Christian Guébogo**
1	Uzbekistan	**Zafar Azimov**
1	Sweden	**Tomas Axnér**
1	Puerto Rico	**Camilo Estévez**
1	Tunisia	**Moez Ben Amor**
1	Angola	**Filipe Cruz**
1	Slovakia	**Pavol Streicher**
1	Romania	**Adrian Vasile**
1	Russia	**Lyudmila Bodniyeva**
1	Hungary	**Vladimir Golovin**
1	Croatia	**Nenad Šoštarić**
1	Czech Republic	**Jan Bašný**
1	Iran	**Ezatollah Razmgar**
1	Paraguay	**Neri Vera**
1	Norway	**Arne Senstad** (Poland)
