= Kim Yun-ji =

Kim Yun-ji may refer to:

- Kim Yun-ji (handballer)
- Kim Yun-ji (footballer)
- Kim Yun-ji (skier)

== See also ==
- Kim Yoon-ji, Korean-American singer
- Jung So-min, born Kim Yoon-ji, actress
