= Řezáč =

Řezáč (feminine: Řezáčová) is a Czech surname. Notable persons with that name include:

- František Řezáč (cyclist), Czech cyclist
- František Řezáč (wrestler), Czech wrestler
- Jaroslav Řezáč (1886–1974), Czech ice hockey player
- Karin Řezáčová (born 2001), Czech handballer
- Stanislav Řezáč (born 1973), Czech skier
