= 2016 Pan American Women's Youth Handball Championship =

Tournament details
- Host country: Chile
- Venue(s): 1 (in 1 host city)
- Dates: 12–16 April
- Teams: 6 (from 1 confederation)

Final positions
- Champions: Brazil (11th title)
- Runner-up: Paraguay
- Third place: Argentina
- Fourth place: Chile

Tournament statistics
- Matches played: 15
- Goals scored: 762 (50.8 per match)
- Attendance: 5,510 (367 per match)
- Top scorer(s): Maite Alonso (ARG), Rocio Gomez (CHI) (33 goals)

Awards
- Best player: Renata Arruda (BRA)

The 2016 Pan American Women's Youth Handball Championship was held in the city of Santiago, Chile from 12 to 16 April 2016. It acts as the American qualifying tournament for the 2016 Women's Youth World Handball Championship.

== Results ==
| Team | Pld | W | D | L | GF | GA | GD | Pts |
|---|---|---|---|---|---|---|---|---|
| Brazil | 5 | 5 | 0 | 0 | 162 | 68 | 94 | 10 |
| Paraguay | 5 | 3 | 0 | 2 | 144 | 129 | 15 | 6 |
| Argentina | 5 | 3 | 0 | 2 | 149 | 118 | 31 | 6 |
| Chile | 5 | 2 | 1 | 2 | 133 | 120 | 13 | 5 |
| Uruguay | 5 | 1 | 1 | 3 | 115 | 137 | -22 | 3 |
| Canada | 5 | 0 | 0 | 5 | 59 | 190 | -131 | 0 |

== Round robin ==
| 12 April 2016; 15:30 | Paraguay | 42–16 | Canada | Centro de Entrenamiento Olímpico, Santiago; Attendance: 200; Referees: Paolantoni, Zanikian (ARG) |
| 12 April 2016; 15:30 | Feschenko 7 | (22–7) | Launhard, Pivin 4 | Centro de Entrenamiento Olímpico, Santiago; Attendance: 200; Referees: Paolantoni, Zanikian (ARG) |
| 12 April 2016; 15:30 | 1× (yellow card) 4× (suspension) | Report | 3× (yellow card) 5× (suspension) | Centro de Entrenamiento Olímpico, Santiago; Attendance: 200; Referees: Paolantoni, Zanikian (ARG) |

| 12 April 2016; 17:30 | Brazil | 31–12 | Uruguay | Centro de Entrenamiento Olímpico, Santiago; Attendance: 300; Referees: Ochatt, Hernalz (ARG) |
| 12 April 2016; 17:30 | four players 4 | (16–7) | Dondan 6 | Centro de Entrenamiento Olímpico, Santiago; Attendance: 300; Referees: Ochatt, Hernalz (ARG) |
| 12 April 2016; 17:30 | 2× (yellow card) 2× (suspension) | Report | 3× (yellow card) 2× (suspension) | Centro de Entrenamiento Olímpico, Santiago; Attendance: 300; Referees: Ochatt, Hernalz (ARG) |

| 12 April 2016; 20:00 | Argentina | 25–20 | Chile | Centro de Entrenamiento Olímpico, Santiago; Attendance: 400; Referees: Oliveira, Nascimento (BRA) |
| 12 April 2016; 20:00 | Manzano 6 | (12–10) | Lovera 6 | Centro de Entrenamiento Olímpico, Santiago; Attendance: 400; Referees: Oliveira, Nascimento (BRA) |
| 12 April 2016; 20:00 | 3× (yellow card) 5× (suspension) | Report | 3× (yellow card) 4× (suspension) | Centro de Entrenamiento Olímpico, Santiago; Attendance: 400; Referees: Oliveira, Nascimento (BRA) |

| 13 April 2016; 16:00 | Uruguay | 20–32 | Paraguay | Centro de Entrenamiento Olímpico, Santiago; Attendance: 150; Referees: Oliveira, Nascimento (BRA) |
| 13 April 2016; 16:00 | Camacho 6 | (9–19) | Insfrán, Fernandez 8 | Centro de Entrenamiento Olímpico, Santiago; Attendance: 150; Referees: Oliveira, Nascimento (BRA) |
| 13 April 2016; 16:00 | 3× (yellow card) 1× (suspension) | Report | 3× (yellow card) 2× (suspension) | Centro de Entrenamiento Olímpico, Santiago; Attendance: 150; Referees: Oliveira, Nascimento (BRA) |

| 13 April 2016; 18:00 | Canada | 13–47 | Argentina | Centro de Entrenamiento Olímpico, Santiago; Attendance: 110; Referees: Moraga, Zavalla (CHI) |
| 13 April 2016; 18:00 | Macdougal 4 | (5–22) | Alonso 10 | Centro de Entrenamiento Olímpico, Santiago; Attendance: 110; Referees: Moraga, Zavalla (CHI) |
| 13 April 2016; 18:00 | 2× (yellow card) 6× (suspension) | Report | 2× (yellow card) 2× (suspension) | Centro de Entrenamiento Olímpico, Santiago; Attendance: 110; Referees: Moraga, Zavalla (CHI) |

| 13 April 2016; 20:00 | Chile | 19–32 | Brazil | Centro de Entrenamiento Olímpico, Santiago; Attendance: 400; Referees: Hernalz, Ochatt (ARG) |
| 13 April 2016; 20:00 | Gomez 6 | (10–15) | Nogueira 7 | Centro de Entrenamiento Olímpico, Santiago; Attendance: 400; Referees: Hernalz, Ochatt (ARG) |
| 13 April 2016; 20:00 | 2× (yellow card) 3× (suspension) | Report | 3× (yellow card) 6× (suspension) | Centro de Entrenamiento Olímpico, Santiago; Attendance: 400; Referees: Hernalz, Ochatt (ARG) |

| 14 April 2016; 16:00 | Brazil | 30–6 | Canada | Centro de Entrenamiento Olímpico, Santiago; Referees: Moraga, Zavalla (CHI) |
| 14 April 2016; 16:00 | Albuquerque 6 | (16–3) | Lacasse 3 | Centro de Entrenamiento Olímpico, Santiago; Referees: Moraga, Zavalla (CHI) |
| 14 April 2016; 16:00 | 2× (yellow card) 1× (suspension) | Report | 2× (yellow card) 4× (suspension) | Centro de Entrenamiento Olímpico, Santiago; Referees: Moraga, Zavalla (CHI) |

| 14 April 2016; 18:00 | Paraguay | 30–25 | Argentina | Centro de Entrenamiento Olímpico, Santiago; Attendance: 350; Referees: Oliveira, Nascimento (BRA) |
| 14 April 2016; 18:00 | Fernandez 7 | (14–9) | García 6 | Centro de Entrenamiento Olímpico, Santiago; Attendance: 350; Referees: Oliveira, Nascimento (BRA) |
| 14 April 2016; 18:00 | 3× (yellow card) 5× (suspension) 1× (red card) | Report | 3× (yellow card) 4× (suspension) | Centro de Entrenamiento Olímpico, Santiago; Attendance: 350; Referees: Oliveira, Nascimento (BRA) |

| 14 April 2016; 20:00 | Uruguay | 26–26 | Chile | Centro de Entrenamiento Olímpico, Santiago; Attendance: 550; Referees: Paoloantoni, Zanikian (ARG) |
| 14 April 2016; 20:00 | three players 5 | (15–16) | Sepulveda 11 | Centro de Entrenamiento Olímpico, Santiago; Attendance: 550; Referees: Paoloantoni, Zanikian (ARG) |
| 14 April 2016; 20:00 | 2× (yellow card) 4× (suspension) | Report | 3× (yellow card) 4× (suspension) | Centro de Entrenamiento Olímpico, Santiago; Attendance: 550; Referees: Paoloantoni, Zanikian (ARG) |

| 15 April 2016; 16:00 | Uruguay | 34–11 | Canada | Centro de Entrenamiento Olímpico, Santiago; Attendance: 150; Referees: Paoloantoni, Zanikian (ARG) |
| 15 April 2016; 16:00 | Grieco 7 | (20–2) | Tremblay 4 | Centro de Entrenamiento Olímpico, Santiago; Attendance: 150; Referees: Paoloantoni, Zanikian (ARG) |
| 15 April 2016; 16:00 | 1× (yellow card) 3× (suspension) | Report | 3× (yellow card) 2× (suspension) | Centro de Entrenamiento Olímpico, Santiago; Attendance: 150; Referees: Paoloantoni, Zanikian (ARG) |

| 15 April 2016; 18:00 | Argentina | 15–32 | Brazil | Centro de Entrenamiento Olímpico, Santiago; Attendance: 300; Referees: Moraga, Zavalla (CHI) |
| 15 April 2016; 18:00 | Alonso 7 | (7–22) | Bitolo, Felix 6 | Centro de Entrenamiento Olímpico, Santiago; Attendance: 300; Referees: Moraga, Zavalla (CHI) |
| 15 April 2016; 18:00 | 2× (yellow card) 1× (suspension) | Report | 3× (yellow card) 6× (suspension) | Centro de Entrenamiento Olímpico, Santiago; Attendance: 300; Referees: Moraga, Zavalla (CHI) |

| 15 April 2016; 20:00 | Chile | 31–24 | Paraguay | Centro de Entrenamiento Olímpico, Santiago; Attendance: 700; Referees: Oliveira, Nascimento (BRA) |
| 15 April 2016; 20:00 | Gomez 12 | (14–15) | Insfrán 8 | Centro de Entrenamiento Olímpico, Santiago; Attendance: 700; Referees: Oliveira, Nascimento (BRA) |
| 15 April 2016; 20:00 | 3× (yellow card) 5× (suspension) | Report | 3× (yellow card) 7× (suspension) | Centro de Entrenamiento Olímpico, Santiago; Attendance: 700; Referees: Oliveira, Nascimento (BRA) |

| 16 April 2016; 16:00 | Argentina | 37–23 | Uruguay | Centro de Entrenamiento Olímpico, Santiago; Attendance: 300; Referees: Oliveira, Nascimento (BRA) |
| 16 April 2016; 16:00 | Alonso 10 | (14–10) | Dondan, Camacho 4 | Centro de Entrenamiento Olímpico, Santiago; Attendance: 300; Referees: Oliveira, Nascimento (BRA) |
| 16 April 2016; 16:00 | 2× (yellow card) 4× (suspension) | Report | 3× (yellow card) 4× (suspension) | Centro de Entrenamiento Olímpico, Santiago; Attendance: 300; Referees: Oliveira, Nascimento (BRA) |

| 16 April 2016; 18:00 | Canada | 13–37 | Chile | Centro de Entrenamiento Olímpico, Santiago; Attendance: 800; Referees: Ochatt, Hernalz (ARG) |
| 16 April 2016; 18:00 | Lacasse 4 | (7–18) | Gomez 6 | Centro de Entrenamiento Olímpico, Santiago; Attendance: 800; Referees: Ochatt, Hernalz (ARG) |
| 16 April 2016; 18:00 | 2× (yellow card) 2× (suspension) | Report | 2× (yellow card) 2× (suspension) | Centro de Entrenamiento Olímpico, Santiago; Attendance: 800; Referees: Ochatt, Hernalz (ARG) |

| 16 April 2016; 20:00 | Brazil | 37–16 | Paraguay | Centro de Entrenamiento Olímpico, Santiago; Attendance: 800; Referees: Paoloantoni, Zanikian (ARG) |
| 16 April 2016; 20:00 | Bitolo 9 | (19–8) | Acuña, Insfrán 4 | Centro de Entrenamiento Olímpico, Santiago; Attendance: 800; Referees: Paoloantoni, Zanikian (ARG) |
| 16 April 2016; 20:00 | 2× (yellow card) 4× (suspension) | Report | 2× (yellow card) 3× (suspension) | Centro de Entrenamiento Olímpico, Santiago; Attendance: 800; Referees: Paoloantoni, Zanikian (ARG) |

== Final standing ==
| Rank | Team |
|---|---|
| Gold medal | Brazil |
| Silver medal | Paraguay |
| Bronze medal | Argentina |
| 4 | Chile |
| 5 | Uruguay |
| 6 | Canada |

| Team qualified to the 2016 Women's Youth World Handball Championship |

== Awards ==
All-star team

- Goalkeeper: (Brazil) Renata Arruda
- Right Wing: (Argentina) Ayelén García
- Right Back: (Brazil) Gabriela Bitolo
- Playmaker: (Chile) Rocio Gomez
- Left Back: (Brazil) Gilvana Nogueira
- Left Wing: (Paraguay) María Paula Fernández
- Pivot: (Chile) Catalina Moreno
