= Gabriela Bitolo =

Brazilian handball player (born 1999)

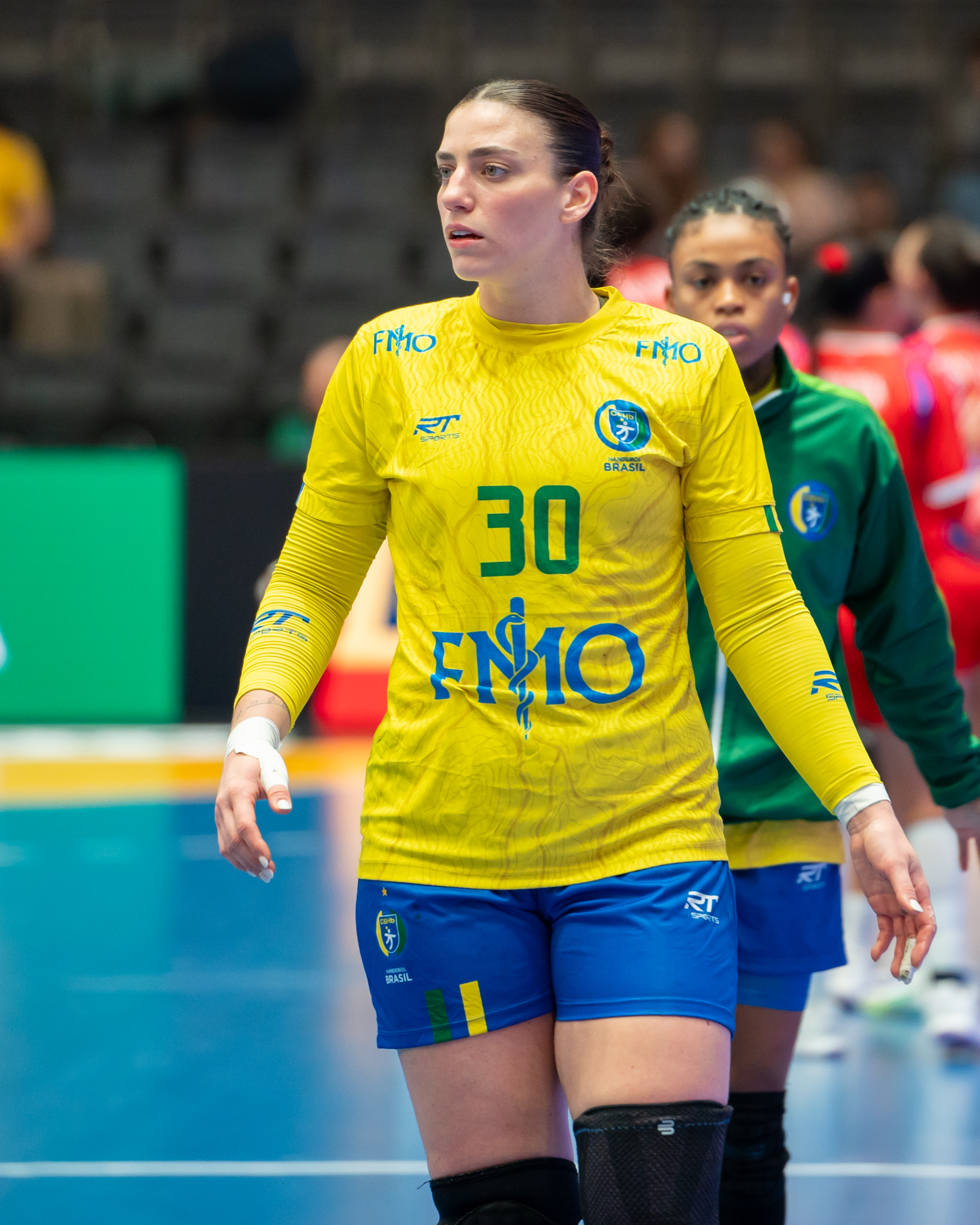
- Bitolo in 2023

Personal information
- Full name: Gabriela Clausson Bitolo
- Born: 1 April 1999 (age 27) São Paulo, Brazil
- Height: 1.80 m (5 ft 11 in)

Sport
- Sport: Handball
- Position: Right back
- Current club: TuS Metzingen
- Number: 22

Senior clubs
- Years: Team
- -2020: EC Pinheiros
- 2021-2022: CB Elche
- 2022-2023: BM Granollers
- 2023-2025: Málaga Costa del Sol
- 2025-: TuS Metzingen
National team
| Years | Team | Apps | (Gls) |
| – | Brazil | 39 | (68) |
Medal record
South and Central American Championship
| Gold medal – first place | 2021 Paraguay |
Pan American Junior Championship
| Gold medal – first place | 2016 Brazil |
Pan American Youth Championship
| Gold medal – first place | 2016 Chile |
- Updated on 26 October 2025

Gabriela "Gabi" Clausson Bitolo (Note: This name uses Portuguese naming customs: the first or maternal family name is Clausson and the second or paternal family name is Bitolo.) (born 1 April 1999) is a Brazilian handballer for the German team TuS Metzingen and the Brazilian national team.

== Achievements ==
- 2016 Pan American Women's Youth Handball Championship: All star team right back
