= Magda Balsam =

Polish handball player (born 1996)

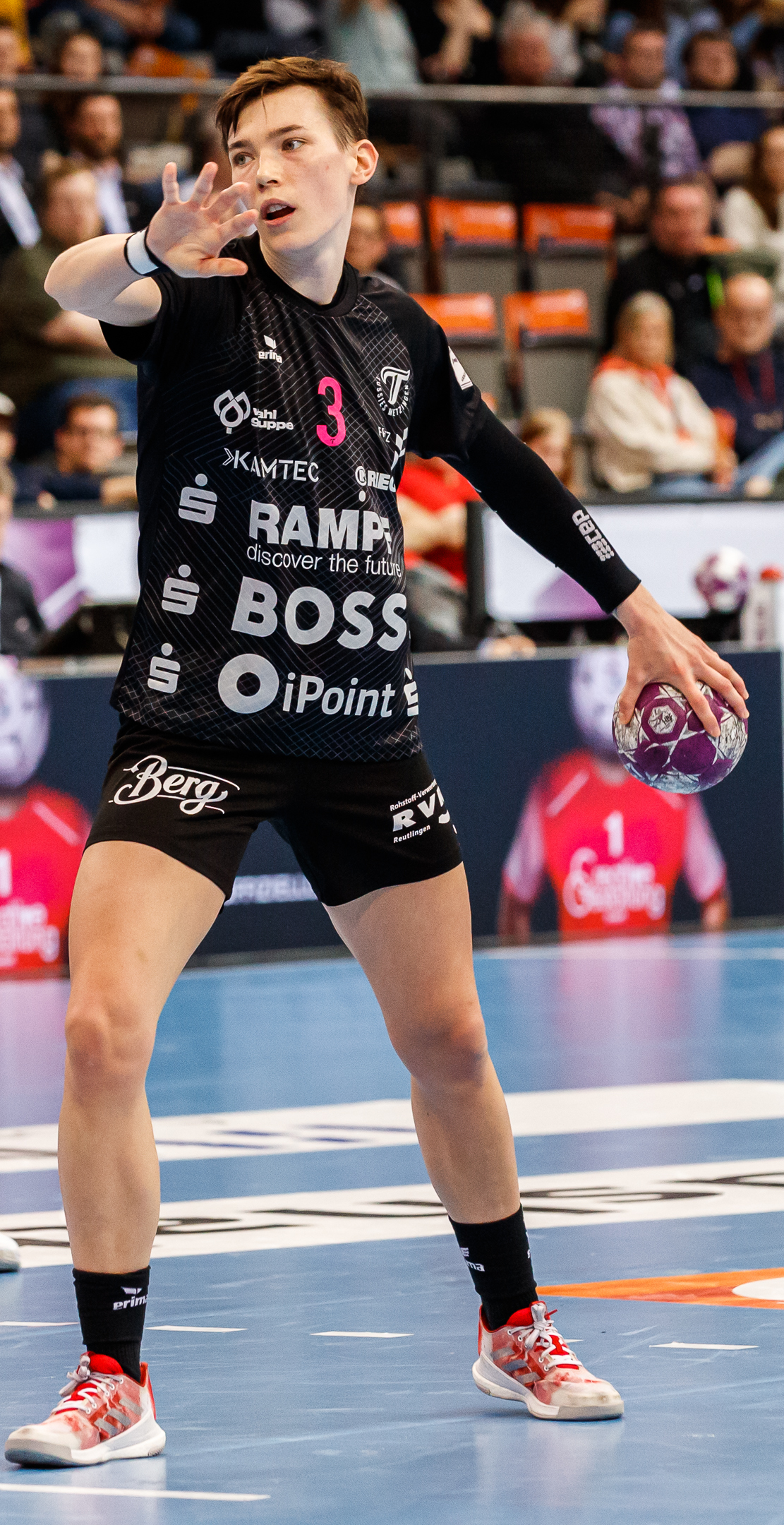

Personal information
- Nationality: Polish
- Born: 20 September 1996 (age 30) Sztum, Poland
- Height: 1.72 m (5 ft 8 in)

Sport
- Sport: Handball
- Position: Right wing
- Current club: JKS Jarosław
- Number: 3

Youth career
- Years: Team
- –: Bellator Ryjewo
- –2015: Vistal Gdynia

Senior clubs
- Years: Team
- 2015–2019: EB Start Elbląg
- 2019–2020: JKS Jarosław
- 2020–2021: MKS Lublin
- 2021–2022: JKS Jarosław
- 2022–2024: TuS Metzingen
- 2024–: CSM Slatina
National team
| Years | Team | Apps | (Gls) |
| 2017– | Poland | 48 | (158) |
- Updated on 3 November 2024

Magda Balsam (born 20 September 1996) is a Polish handballer for CSM Slatina and the Polish national team.

She participated at the 2021 World Women's Handball Championship in Spain, placing 15th.

== Career ==
Balsam started playing as a kid in Bellator Ryjewo. She transferred to top flight team in 2015, where she was loaned to Sambor Tczew for three months.

She played there for four seasons, before switching to fellow polish top flight team JKS Jarosław in 2019. In her first season at the club she scored 132 goals in 20 matches, making her the second most scored player in that league season. This prompted a move to league rivals MKS Lublin the following season, but she returned to JKS Jarosław after only a season in Lublin.

In the 2022/2023 season she joined German Bundesliga side TuS Metzingen. Here she would again only stay for a season before rejoining MKS Lublin for the second time for the 2023/2024 season.

Balsam debuted for the Polish national team in March 2017 in a match against Belarus.

== Achievements ==
- Ekstraklasa:
  - Bronze Medalist: 2020
