= Claude Toukéné-Guébogo =

Cameroonian sprinter

Personal information
- Nationality: Cameroonian
- Born: 25 February 1975 (age 51)
- Relative: Serge Christian Guébogo (brother)

Sport
- Sport: Sprinting
- Event: 4 × 100 metres relay
Medal record
Men's athletics
Representing Cameroon
African Championships
Bronze medal – third place	1996 Yaoundé	4×100 m
Bronze medal – third place	1998 Dakar	4×100 m

Claude Toukéné-Guébogo (born 25 February 1975) is a Cameroonian sprinter. He competed in the men's 4 × 100 metres relay at the 1996 Summer Olympics.

Toukene-Guébogo competed for the Norfolk State Spartans track and field team in the NCAA. He later became a high school and college athletics coach.
