= Alexandra Badea =

Romanian handball player (born 1998)

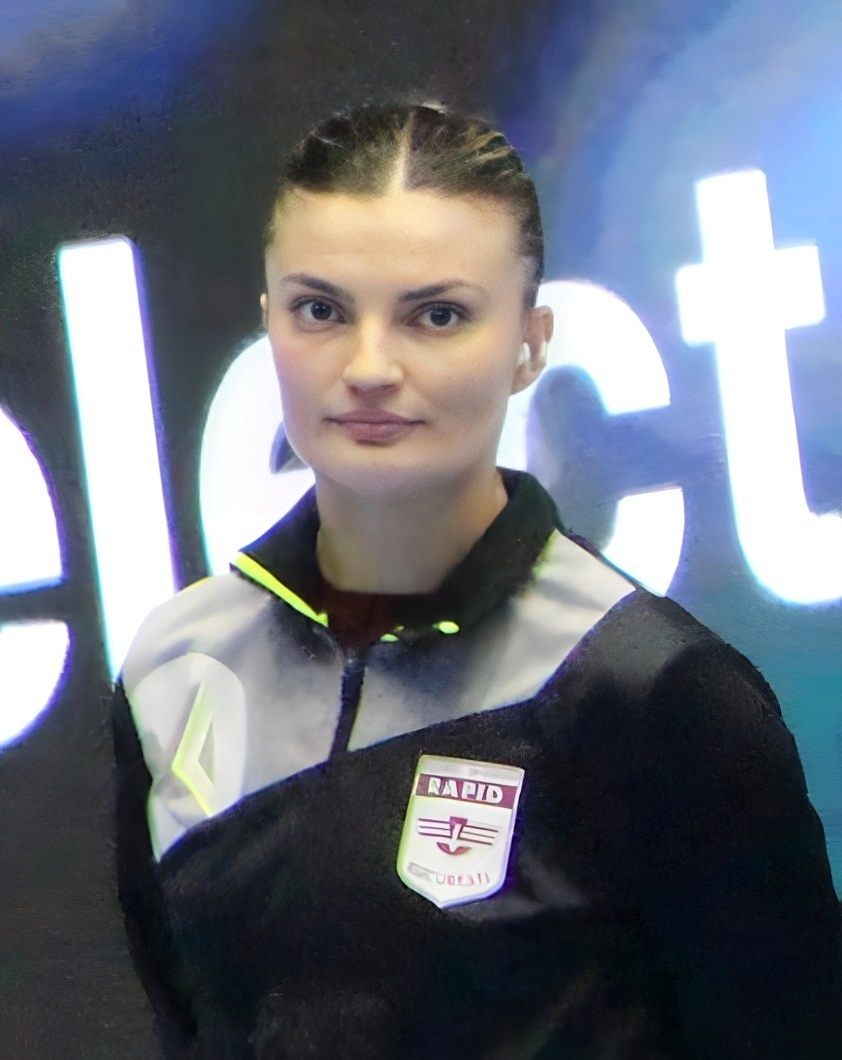

Personal information
- Full name: Alexandra Diana Badea
- Nationality: Romanian
- Born: 22 May 1998 (age 28) Bucharest, Romania
- Height: 1.77 m (5 ft 10 in)

Sport
- Sport: Handball
- Position: Right wing
- Current club: Rapid București

Youth career
- Years: Team
- 2011–2017: ACS Școala 181

Senior clubs
- Years: Team
- 2017: Dinamo București
- 2017–2020: SCM Râmnicu Vâlcea
- 2020–: Rapid București

Alexandra Diana Badea (born 22 May 1998) is a Romanian handballer who plays as a right wing for Rapid București.

== Achievements ==
- Liga Națională:
  - Winner: 2019, 2022
- Cupa României:
  - Finalist: 2018, 2019
- Supercupa României:
  - Winner: 2018
