= Avelle Ntondele =

Congolese handball player

Personal information
- Nationality: Congolese
- Born: 30 August 1998 (age 28)
- Height: 1.66 m (5 ft 5 in)

Sport
- Sport: Handball
- Position: Centre back
- Current club: Étoile du Congo
National team
Years	Team	Apps	(Gls)
–	Congo	10	(9)
Medal record
African Championship
Bronze medal – third place	2022 Dakar

Avelle Ntondele (born 30 August 1998) is a Congolese handball player for Étoile du Congo and the Congolese national team.

She represented Congo at the 2021 World Women's Handball Championship in Spain.
