= Adriana Medveďová =

Slovak handball player (born 1992)

Personal information
- Nationality: Slovak
- Born: 11 July 1992 (age 34) Banská Bystrica, Czechoslovakia
- Height: 184 cm (6 ft 1/2 in)

Sport
- Sport: Handball
- Position: Goalkeeper

Senior clubs
- Years: Team
- –2017: IUVENTA Michalovce
- 2017-2018: HC Danubius Galați
- 2018-2019: CS Minaur Baia Mare
National team
- Years: Team
- –: Slovakia

Adriana Medveďová (born 11 July 1992) is a Slovak handballer who plays for the Slovakia national team.

== Achievements ==
- Czech–Slovak Interliga:
  - Winner: 2013, 2014, 2015, 2016, 2017
