= Lara Burić =

Croatian handballer (born 2003)

Personal information
- Nationality: Croatian
- Born: 13 August 2003 (age 23) Zagreb, Croatia
- Height: 1.70 m (5 ft 7 in)

Sport
- Sport: Handball
- Position: Right wing
- Current club: DAC Dunajská Streda
- Number: 3

Senior clubs
- Years: Team
- –2021: RK Sesvete Agroproteinka
- 2021–2026: RK Lokomotiva Zagreb
- 2026–: DAC Dunajská Streda
National team
Years	Team	Apps	(Gls)
2021–	Croatia	52	(73)
- Updated on 29 October 2026

Lara Burić (born 13 August 2003) is a Croatian handballer for DAC Dunajská Streda and the Croatian national team.

She represented Croatia at the 2021 and 2025 World Women's Handball Championship.
