= Neri Vera =

Paraguayan handball coach

Neri Rubén Vera is a Paraguayan handball coach of the Paraguay women's national team. He coached them at the 2017 World Women's Handball Championship and at the 2021 World Women's Handball Championship.

He also won a bronze medal at the 2017 Pan American Women's Handball Championship, beating Uruguay in the third-place playoff.
