= Belvina Mouyamba =

Congolese handball player

Personal information
- Nationality: Congolese
- Born: 25 September 1996 (age 30)
- Height: 1.64 m (5 ft 5 in)

Sport
- Sport: Handball
- Position: Left back
- Current club: CARA Brazzaville
National team
Years	Team	Apps	(Gls)
–	Congo	9	(15)

Belvina Mouyamba (born 25 September 1996) is a Congolese handball player for CARA Brazzaville and the Congolese national team.

She represented Congo at the 2021 World Women's Handball Championship in Spain.
