= Mana Yamamoto =

Japanese handball player (born 1997)

Personal information
- Full name: Mana Yamamoto
- Nationality: Japanese
- Born: 22 March 1997 (age 29)
- Height: 1.75 m (5 ft 9 in)

Sport
- Sport: Handball
- Position: Left back
- Current club: HC Nagoya
National team
Years	Team	Apps	(Gls)
–	Japan	7	(24)

Mana Yamamoto (born 22 March 1997) is a Japanese female handball player for HC Nagoya and the Japanese national team.

She represented Japan at the 2021 World Women's Handball Championship in Spain.
