= Patience Okabande =

Congolese handball player

Personal information
- Nationality: Congolese
- Born: 18 May 1995 (age 31)
- Height: 1.68 m (5 ft 6 in)

Sport
- Sport: Handball
- Position: Centre back
- Current club: Blanzat Sport Montluçon Handball
National team
Years	Team	Apps	(Gls)
–	Congo	7	(6)

Patience Okabande (born 18 May 1995) is a Congolese handball player for Blanzat Sport Montluçon Handball and the Congolese national team. She represented Congo at the 2021 World Women's Handball Championship in Spain.
