= Gabriela Gudelj =

Croatian handballer (born 1997)

Personal information
- Nationality: Croatian
- Born: 9 August 1997 (age 29) Split, Croatia
- Height: 1.75 m (5 ft 9 in)

Sport
- Sport: Handball
- Position: Right back
- Current club: ŽRK Sinj
- Number: 55

Youth career
- Years: Team
- –: ŽARK Split

Senior clubs
- Years: Team
- 2015–2016: RK Lokomotiva Zagreb
- 2016–2017: HŽRK Grude
- 2017–2019: Gjøvik HK
- 2019–2020: Byåsen HE
- 2020–2022: ŽRK Zrinski Čakovec
- 2022: RK Podravka Koprivnica
- 2022: CS Minaur Baia Mare
- 2022–2023: ŽRK Split 2010
- 2023–2025: ŽRK Zrinski Čakovec
- 2025–: ŽRK Sinj
National team
Years	Team	Apps	(Gls)
2021–	Croatia	3	(0)

Gabriela Gudelj (born 9 August 1997) is a Croatian handballer for ŽRK Sinj and the Croatian national team.

She represented Croatia at the 2021 World Women's Handball Championship.
