= Abinaomi Osawa =

Japanese handball player (born 1997)

Personal information
- Full name: Abinaomi Osawa
- Nationality: Japanese
- Born: 31 July 1997 (age 29)
- Height: 1.70 m (5 ft 7 in)

Sport
- Sport: Handball
- Position: Goalkeeper
- Current club: Sony Semiconductor
National team
Years	Team	Apps	(Gls)
2021–	Japan	0	(0)

Abinaomi Osawa (born 31 July 1997) is a Japanese female handball player for Sony Semiconductor and the Japanese national team.

She represented Japan at the 2021 World Women's Handball Championship in Spain.
