= Johanna Schindler =

Austrian handballer (born 1994)

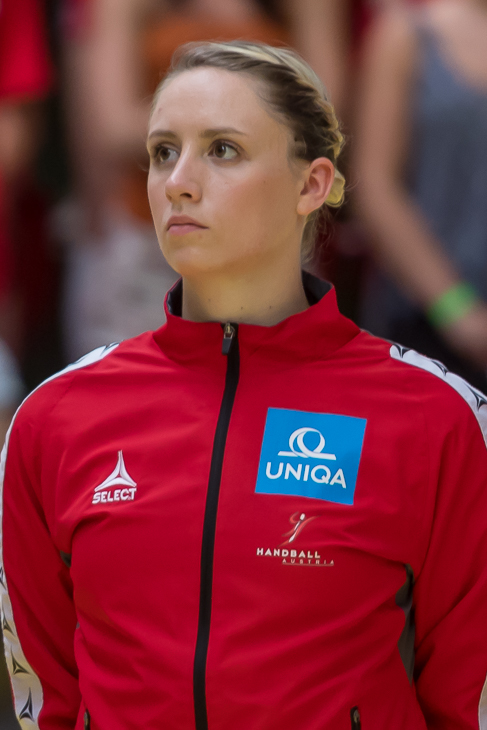

Personal information
- Nationality: Austrian
- Born: 8 July 1994 (age 32) Vienna, Austria
- Height: 1.71 m (5 ft 7 in)

Sport
- Sport: Handball
- Position: Left back
- Current club: Hypo Niederösterreich
- Number: 9

Senior clubs
- Years: Team
- 2001-2016: Union Korneuburg
- 2016-2020: Frisch Auf Göppingen
- 2020-2023: Hypo Niederösterreich
National team
Years	Team	Apps	(Gls)
2013–2023	Austria	73	(56)
- Updated on 31 August 2023

Johanna Schindler (born 8 July 1994) is an Austrian former handballer who played for the Austrian national team. During her career, she played for Union Korneuburg and Hypo Niederösterreich in Austria and Frisch Auf Göppingen in Germany.

She represented Austria at the 2021 World Women's Handball Championship, placing 16th.
