= Martina Thörn =

Swedish handball player (born 1991)

Personal information
- Nationality: Swedish
- Born: 21 February 1991 (age 35) Västerås, Sweden
- Height: 1.78 m (5 ft 10 in)

Sport
- Sport: Handball
- Position: Goalkeeper
- Current club: København Håndbold
- Number: 1

Senior clubs
- Years: Team
- 2015–2016: Glassverket IF
- 2016–2017: FC Midtjylland
- 2017–2019: Randers HK
- 2019–2021: Aarhus United
- 2021–2023: Odense Håndbold
- 2023–: København Håndbold
National team
Years	Team	Apps	(Gls)
2016–	Sweden	30	(0)
- Updated on 9 July 2023

Martina Thörn (born 21 February 1991) is a Swedish handball player for København Håndbold and the Swedish national team.

She represented Sweden at the 2019 World Women's Handball Championship.
