= Serge Christian Guébogo =

Cameroonian handballer and coach (1980–2023)

- Born: 1980
- Died: 14 February 2023 (aged 42–43)
- Education: University of Yaoundé II; University of Yaoundé I Institut national de la jeunesse et des sports
- Occupations: Handballer, coach
- Relatives: Claude Toukéné-Guébogo (brother)

Serge Christian Guébogo (1980 – 14 February 2023) was a Cameroonian handballer and coach.

== Life and career ==
Born in 1980, the brother of sprinter Claude Toukéné-Guébogo. Guébogo was nicknamed Guinness and played handball as a fullback. He played for his secondary school team in Tsinga and stayed at the University of Yaoundé II for one year before joining the University of Yaoundé I, where he studied history. He won university trophies and was subsequently admitted to the Institut national de la jeunesse et des sports and studied to become a coach. He played for a local club in Yaoundé but never represented the national team.

Guébogo became the coach of Ekang Handball in 2003 and was assistant coach of the junior team of Tonnerre Kalara Club de Yaoundé from 2005 to 2007. He was head coach of the latter club's senior team from 2012 to 2016, a time during which the club reached the final of the 2016 African Women's Handball Cup Winners' Cup.

In April 2019, he became the coach of the Cameroon women's national handball team, whom he took to second place in the 2019 African Games, as well as second place in the 2021 African Women's Handball Championship and the 2022 African Women's Handball Championship. On 6 November 2022, he On 26 January 2023, he was awarded the Silver Star of the Olympic Order by the Cameroon Olympic and Sports Committee. He was also trainer of the Handball Lionesses.

== Death ==
Guébogo died on 14 February 2023.
