= Antalya Anadolu SK =

Turkish handball club

- Full name: Antalya Anadolu Spor Kulübü
- Head coach: Kıvanç Özcan
- League: Turkish Super League
- Club colours

Antalya Anadolu is the women's handball team of the same named club in Antalya, Turkey. The team plays in the Turkish Super League. Club colors are red, blue and white. The team completed the Turkish Women's Handball Super League in the last place in the 2021–2022 season, and was relegated from the league. In the 2022–2023 season, the team transferred its rights to the 2nd team of Konyaaltı Belediyespor, another team of the city, and withdrew from the leagues.
