= Mirela Dedic =

Austrian handball player (born 1991)

Mirela Dedić
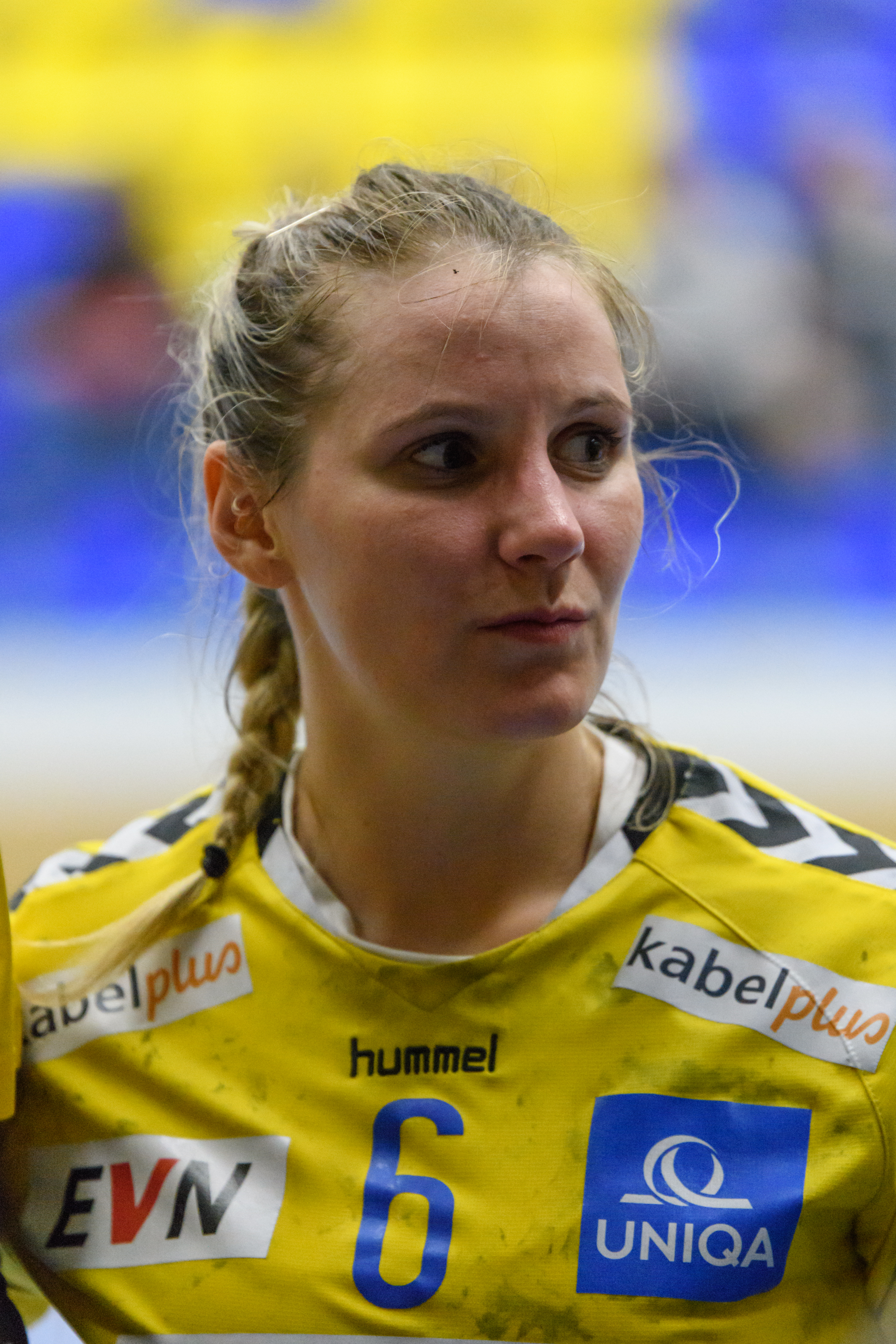

Personal information
- Nationality: Austrian
- Born: 15 December 1991 (age 34) Bruck an der Mur, Austria
- Height: 1.69 m (5 ft 7 in)

Sport
- Sport: Handball
- Position: Left wing
- Current club: Hypo Niederösterreich
- Number: 6

Youth career
- Years: Team
- –: Bruck an der Leitha

Senior clubs
- Years: Team
- 2008-: Hypo Niederösterreich
National team
Years	Team	Apps	(Gls)
2011-	Austria	90	(150)
- Updated on 6 November 2024

Mirela Dedić (born 15 December 1991) is an Austrian handball player for Hypo Niederösterreich and the Austrian national team.

She debuted for the Austrian national team on 22 April 2011. She represented Austria at the 2023 World Championship.
