= Richca Obangue =

Congolese handball player

Personal information
- Nationality: Congolese
- Born: 2 September 1994 (age 32)
- Height: 1.75 m (5 ft 9 in)

Sport
- Sport: Handball
- Position: Centre back
- Current club: DGSB Brazzaville
National team
Years	Team	Apps	(Gls)
–	Congo	8	(4)

Richca Obangue (born 2 September 1994) is a Congolese handball player for DGSB Brazzaville and the Congolese national team.

She represented Congo at the 2021 World Women's Handball Championship in Spain.
