= Magda Kašpárková =

Czech handball player

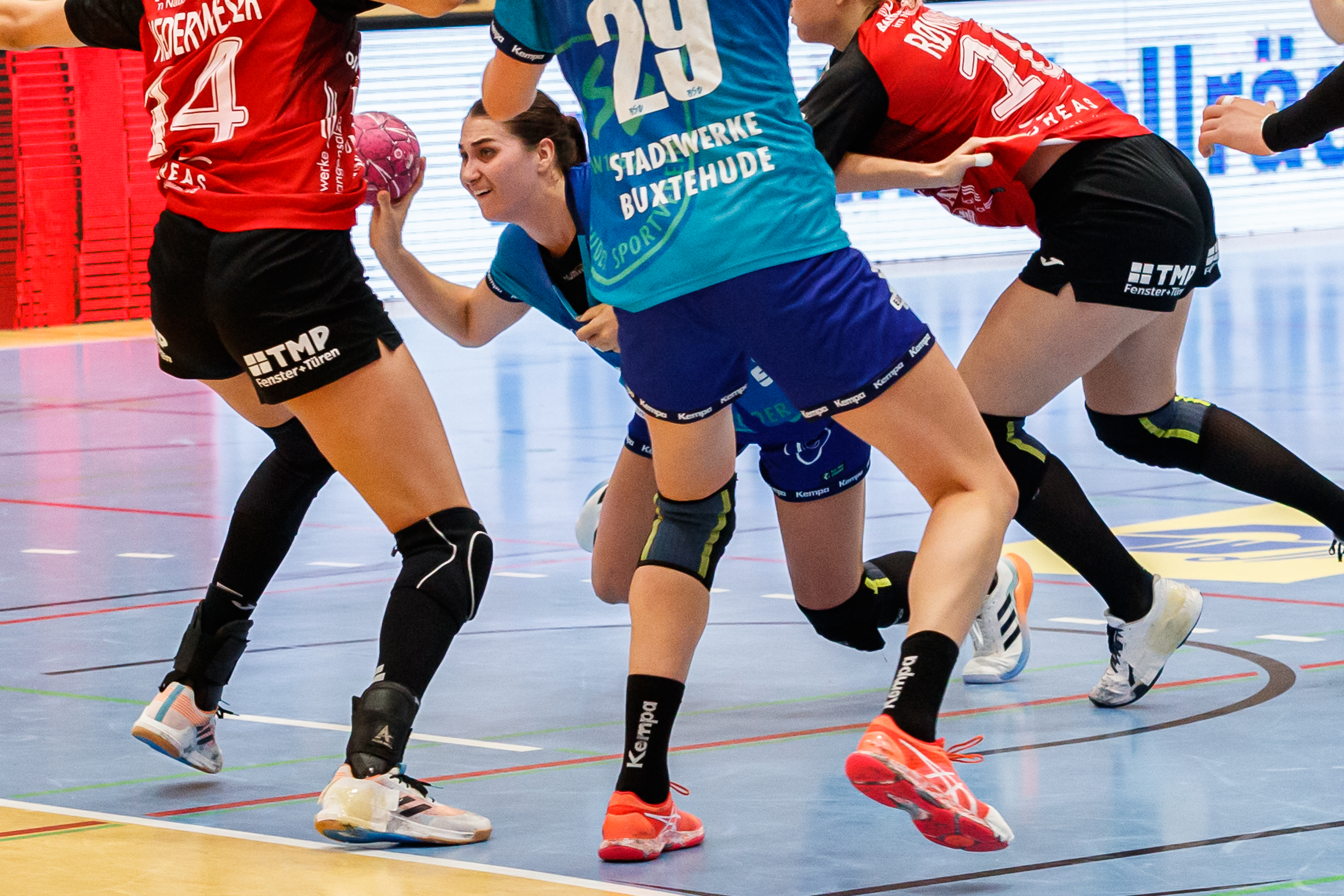

Personal information
- Nationality: Czech
- Born: 26 October 1997 (age 28) Olomouc, Czech Republic
- Height: 1.76 m (5 ft 9 in)

Sport
- Sport: Handball
- Position: Left back
- Current club: Buxtehuder SV
- Number: 77
National team
Years	Team	Apps	(Gls)
2021–	Czech Republic	2	(0)

Magda Kašpárková (born 26 October 1997) is a Czech handballer for Buxtehuder SV and the Czech national team.

She participated at the 2021 World Women's Handball Championship in Spain, placing 19th.

== Achievements ==
- Czech First Division:
  - Winner: 2019, 2021
