= Claudia Wess =

Austrian handball player (born 1995)

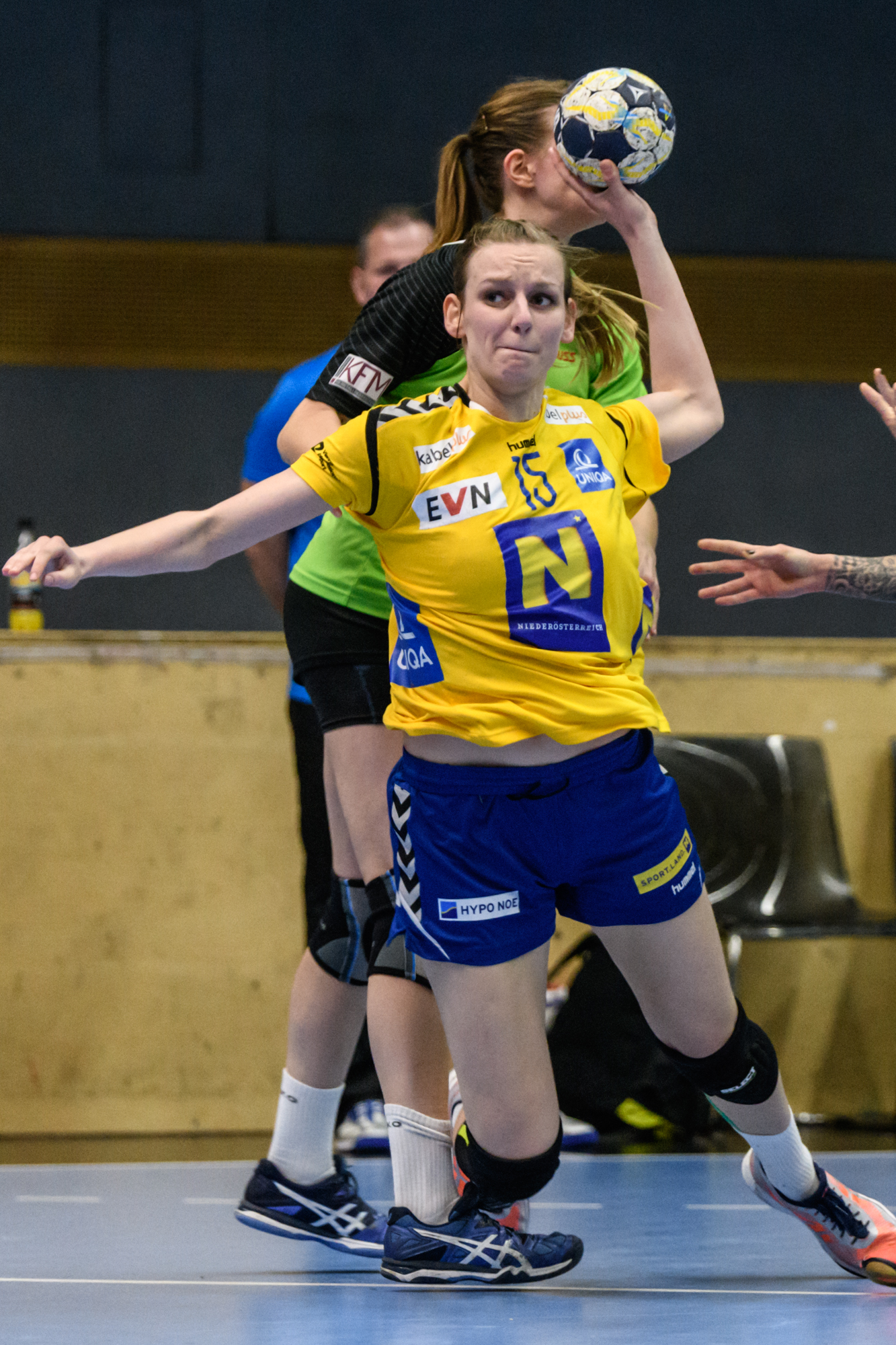

Personal information
- Nationality: Austrian
- Born: 15 June 1995 (age 31) Wien, Austria
- Height: 1.82 m (6 ft 0 in)

Sport
- Sport: Handball
- Position: Right back
- Current club: Hypo Niederösterreich
- Number: 15

Senior clubs
- Years: Team
- -2026: Hypo Niederösterreich
National team
Years	Team	Apps	(Gls)
2014-2026	Austria	98	(94)
- Updated on 6 September 2026

Claudia Wess (born 15 June 1995) is an Austrian former handball player. She played her entire career for Hypo Niederösterreich and featured in the Austrian national team.

She represented Austria at the 2021 World Women's Handball Championship, placing 16th.

She retired after the 2025-26 season.
