= Ayelén García =

Argentine handball player

Personal information
- Nationality: Argentine
- Born: 13 December 1999 (age 26)
- Height: 1.66 m (5 ft 5 in)

Sport
- Sport: Handball
- Position: Right wing
- Current club: Beti Onak

Senior clubs
- Years: Team
- -2022: River Plate
- 2022-: Beti Onak
National team
Years	Team	Apps	(Gls)
–	Argentina	62	(103)
Medal record
Pan American Games
Silver medal – second place	2023 Santiago	Team
South and Central American Championship
Silver medal – second place	2018 Brazil
Silver medal – second place	2022 Argentina
Pan American Junior Championship
Bronze medal – third place	2016 Chile
- Updated on 2 November 2025

Ayelén García (born 13 December 1999) is an Argentine handball player for River Plate and the Argentine national team.

== Awards ==
- 2016 Pan American Women's Youth Handball Championship: All star team Right wing
