= Magalie Bazekene =

Congolese handball player

Personal information
- Nationality: Congolese
- Born: 11 December 1992 (age 33)
- Height: 1.78 m (5 ft 10 in)

Sport
- Sport: Handball
- Position: Goalkeeper
- Current club: CARA Brazzaville
National team
Years	Team	Apps	(Gls)
–	Congo	11	(0)

Magalie Bazekene (born 11 December 1992) is a Congolese handball player for CARA Brazzaville and the Congolese national team.

She represented Congo at the 2021 World Women's Handball Championship in Spain.
