= Evelina Källhage =

Swedish handball player (born 1997)

Personal information
- Full name: Evelina Källhage
- Nationality: Swedish
- Born: 20 April 1997 (age 29) Gothenburg, Sweden
- Height: 1.70 m (5 ft 7 in)

Sport
- Sport: Handball
- Position: Right wing
- Current club: Önnereds HK
- Number: 4

Senior clubs
- Years: Team
- –2017: Önnereds HK
- 2017–2021: H 65 Höör
- 2021–: Önnereds HK
National team
| Years | Team | Apps | (Gls) |
| 2018– | Sweden | 15 | (19) |
- Updated on 3 April 2026

Evelina Källhage (born 20 April 1997) is a Swedish handball player who plays for Önnereds HK.

== Achievements ==
- SHE:
  - Silver Medalist: 2018 and 2021
