= Tamara Kocić =

Serbian handball player (born 2003)

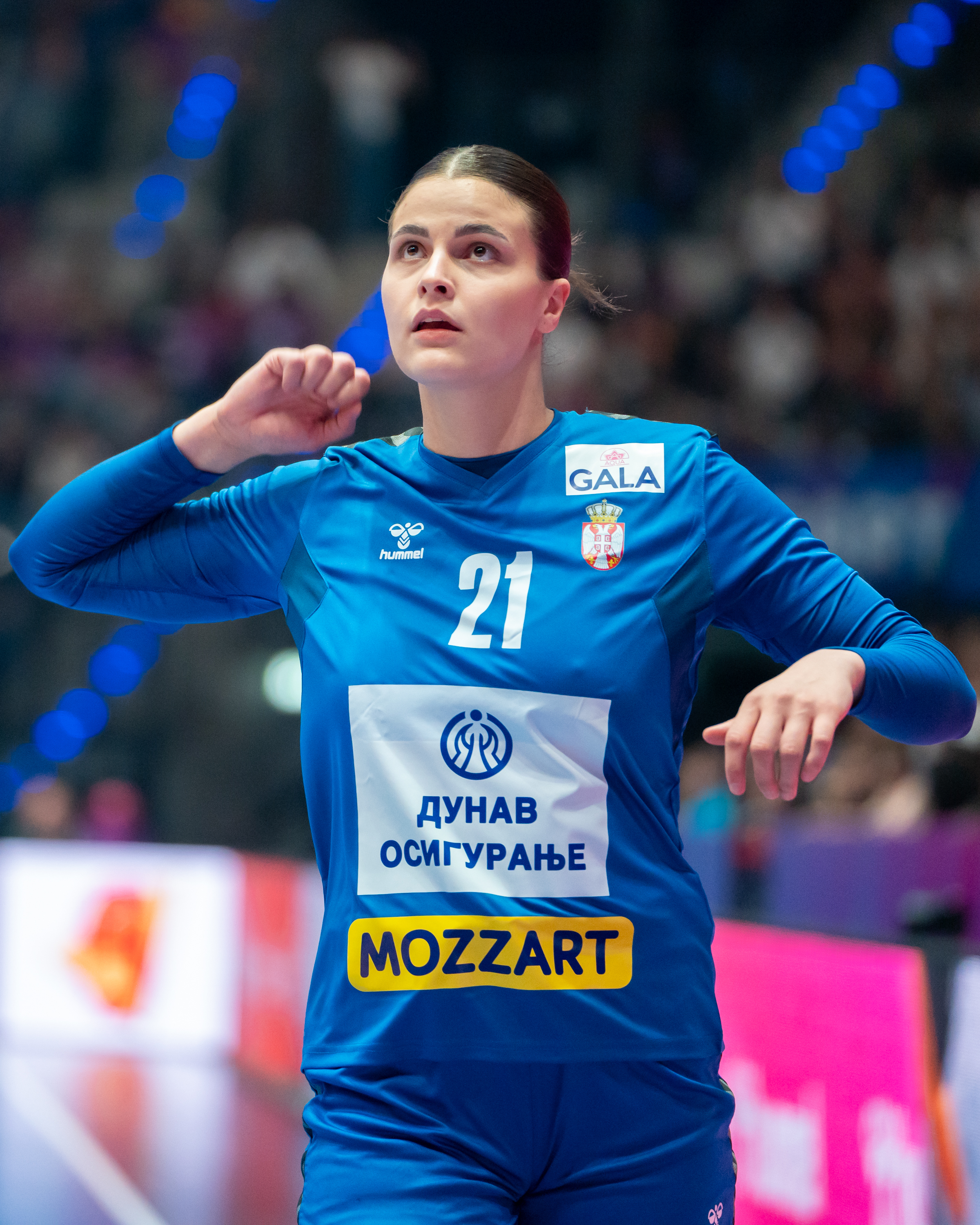

Personal information
- Nationality: Serbian
- Born: 17 July 2003 (age 23) Belgrade, Serbia
- Height: 1.76 m (5 ft 9 in)

Sport
- Sport: Handball
- Position: Left wing
- Current club: Bekament Bukovička Banja
- Number: 3

Senior clubs
- Years: Team
- 2021-: Bekament Bukovička Banja
National team
Years	Team	Apps	(Gls)
2021–	Serbia	16	(11)
- Updated on 5 November 2025

Tamara Kocić (Serbian Cyrillic: Тамара Коцић; born 17 July 2003) is a Serbian handball player for Bekament Bukovička Banja and the Serbian national team.

She represented Serbia at the 2021 World Women's Handball Championship.
