= JKS Jarosław (handball) =

Polish women's handball team

Eurobud JKS Jarosław
- Full name: Eurobud Grupa Jarosławski Klub Sportowy Jarosław
- Founded: 1909
- Arena: Hala MOSiR w Jarosławiu
- Capacity: 800
- President: Robert Wiśniewski
- Head coach: Vit Teleky
- League: Ekstraklasa
- 2022–23: 5th

Eurobud JKS Jarosław is a women's handball team, based in Jarosław.

== See also ==
- Handball in Poland
- Sports in Poland
