= Kim Yun-ji (handballer) =

South Korean handball player (born 2000)

Personal information
- Nationality: South Korean
- Born: January 16, 2000 (age 26)
- Height: 1.70 m (5 ft 7 in)

Sport
- Sport: Handball
- Position: Right wing
- Current club: Wonderful Samcheok
- Number: 11

Youth career
- Years: Team
- 2015–2017: Hwikyung Girls' High School

Senior clubs
- Years: Team
- 2018–: Wonderful Samcheok
National team
- Years: Team
- 2021–: South Korea
Medal record
Asian Championship
Gold medal – first place	2022 South Korea

Korean name
- Hangul: 김윤지
- RR: Gim Yunji
- MR: Kim Yunji

Kim Yun-ji (Korean: 김윤지; born January 16, 2000) is a South Korean handball player currently playing for Samcheok City of the Handball Korea League. She competed in the 2020 Summer Olympics.
