= Karin Řezáčová =

Czech handball player

Personal information
- Nationality: Czech
- Born: 25 October 2001 (age 24) Olomouc, Czech Republic
- Height: 1.77 m (5 ft 10 in)

Sport
- Sport: Handball
- Position: Goalkeeper
- Current club: DHC Plzeň
- Number: 12

Senior clubs
- Years: Team
- 2021–: DHC Plzeň
National team
Years	Team	Apps	(Gls)
2021–	Czech Republic	18	(0)
- Updated on 24 April 2024

Karin Řezáčová (born 25 October 2001) is a Czech handballer for DHC Plzeň and the Czech national team.

She participated at the 2021 World Women's Handball Championship in Spain, placing 19th.
