= 2016 Women's Junior World Handball Championship =

Handball tournament

Tournament details
- Host country: Russia
- Venues: 2 (in 1 host city)
- Dates: 2–15 July
- Teams: 24 (from 4 confederations)

Final positions
- Champions: Denmark (2nd title)
- Runners-up: Russia
- Third place: Romania
- Fourth place: Germany

Tournament statistics
- Matches played: 92
- Goals scored: 5,017 (54.53 per match)
- Attendance: 15,710 (171 per match)
- Top scorers: (South Korea) Song Ji-eun (85 goals)

Awards
- Best player: (Russia) Yaroslava Frolova

The 2016 Women's Junior World Handball Championship was the 20th edition of the tournament and took place in Moscow, Russia from 2 to 15 July 2016. Denmark won their second title after defeating Russia 32–28 in the final.

== Teams ==
Africa

- Angola
- Egypt
- Tunisia

Asia

- China
- Japan
- Kazakhstan
- South Korea
- Uzbekistan

Europe

- Austria (Substitute for Oceania)
- Croatia
- Denmark
- France
- Germany
- Hungary
- Montenegro
- Netherlands
- Norway
- Romania
- Russia (Host)
- Spain
- Sweden

Pan-America

- Argentina
- Brazil
- Chile

== Venues ==
Matches will be played in Moscow.

- Krylatskoye Sports Palace (5,000)
- Alexander Gomelsky Universal Sports Hall CSKA (5,500)

== Referees ==
The following 16 referee pairs were selected.

Referees
Bahrain	Muammar Al-Watani; Mohammed Qamber
Bosnia and Herzegovina	Amar Konjičanin; Dino Konjičanin
Brazil	Adriano Alves; Daniel Magalhães
Czech Republic	Jiří Opava; Pavel Válek
France	Karim Gasmi; Raouf Gasmi
Hungary	Miklós Andorcka; Robert Hucker
Moldova	Alexei Covalciuc; Igor Covalciuc
Montenegro	Novica Mitrović; Miljan Vešović

Referees
Norway	Håvard Kleven; Lars Jørum
Russia	Dmitry Kiselev; Alexey Kiyashko
Spain	Ion Bustamante; Javier Álvarez
Sweden	Mirza Kurtagic; Mattias Wetterwik
Switzerland	Arthur Brunner; Morad Salah
Turkey	Kürsad Erdoğan; Ibrahim Özdeniz
United States	Christian Posch; Lars Jedermann
Uruguay	Gabriel Gonzales; Camilo Prieto

== Preliminary round ==
All time are local (UTC+3).

=== Group A ===
Pos	Team	Pld	W	D	L	GF	GA	GD	Pts	Qualification
1	Denmark	5	5	0	0	151	104	+47	10	Quarterfinals
2	Norway	5	4	0	1	181	116	+65	8	Quarterfinals
3	Hungary	5	3	0	2	141	125	+16	6	Quarterfinals
4	Angola	5	1	1	3	133	135	−2	3 (Note: Montenegro 22–22 Angola)	Quarterfinals
5	Montenegro	5	1	1	3	111	126	−15	3	
6	Uzbekistan	5	0	0	5	92	203	−111	0	

Source: IHF
Rules for classification: 1) Points; 2) Head-to-head points; 3) Head-to-head goal difference; 4) Head-to-head goals scored; 5) Goal difference; 6) Goals scored; 7) Draw.
Notes:

3 July 2016; 10:00	Denmark	28–24	Angola	USH CSKA, Moscow; Attendance: 100; Referees: Kiselev, Kiyashko (RUS)
3 July 2016; 10:00	M. Nielsen 7	(12–15)	three players 5	USH CSKA, Moscow; Attendance: 100; Referees: Kiselev, Kiyashko (RUS)
3 July 2016; 10:00	3× (yellow card) 2× (suspension)	Report	3× (yellow card) 2× (suspension)	USH CSKA, Moscow; Attendance: 100; Referees: Kiselev, Kiyashko (RUS)

3 July 2016; 12:00	Hungary	41–19	Uzbekistan	USH CSKA, Moscow; Attendance: 100; Referees: Kurtagic, Wetterwik (SWE)
3 July 2016; 12:00	Ferenczy 8	(27–9)	Najmedinova 5	USH CSKA, Moscow; Attendance: 100; Referees: Kurtagic, Wetterwik (SWE)
3 July 2016; 12:00	3× (yellow card) 4× (suspension)	Report	3× (yellow card) 5× (suspension)	USH CSKA, Moscow; Attendance: 100; Referees: Kurtagic, Wetterwik (SWE)

3 July 2016; 14:00	Montenegro	23–35	Norway	USH CSKA, Moscow; Attendance: 120; Referees: Bustamente, Álvarez (ESP)
3 July 2016; 14:00	Jovićević 6	(9–19)	Bergset, Hernes 5	USH CSKA, Moscow; Attendance: 120; Referees: Bustamente, Álvarez (ESP)
3 July 2016; 14:00	2× (yellow card) 3× (suspension)	Report	2× (yellow card) 3× (suspension)	USH CSKA, Moscow; Attendance: 120; Referees: Bustamente, Álvarez (ESP)

5 July 2016; 16:00	Angola	22–33	Hungary	USH CSKA, Moscow; Attendance: 100; Referees: Alves, Magalhaes (BRA)
5 July 2016; 16:00	Costa 6	(12–15)	Szabó, Tóth 7	USH CSKA, Moscow; Attendance: 100; Referees: Alves, Magalhaes (BRA)
5 July 2016; 16:00	3× (yellow card) 9× (suspension)	Report	3× (yellow card) 4× (suspension)	USH CSKA, Moscow; Attendance: 100; Referees: Alves, Magalhaes (BRA)

5 July 2016; 18:00	Norway	28–30	Denmark	USH CSKA, Moscow; Attendance: 200; Referees: Gasmi, Gasmi (FRA)
5 July 2016; 18:00	Gigstad Fauske 6	(15–15)	M. Nielsen 8	USH CSKA, Moscow; Attendance: 200; Referees: Gasmi, Gasmi (FRA)
5 July 2016; 18:00	3× (yellow card) 5× (suspension)	Report	3× (yellow card) 1× (suspension)	USH CSKA, Moscow; Attendance: 200; Referees: Gasmi, Gasmi (FRA)

5 July 2016; 20:00	Uzbekistan	19–25	Montenegro	USH CSKA, Moscow; Attendance: 100; Referees: Gonzales, Prieto (URU)
5 July 2016; 20:00	Najmedinova 6	(9–15)	Novaković, Pavićević 6	USH CSKA, Moscow; Attendance: 100; Referees: Gonzales, Prieto (URU)
5 July 2016; 20:00	3× (yellow card) 2× (suspension)	Report	3× (yellow card) 7× (suspension)	USH CSKA, Moscow; Attendance: 100; Referees: Gonzales, Prieto (URU)

6 July 2016; 16:00	Denmark	41–15	Uzbekistan	USH CSKA, Moscow; Attendance: 110; Referees: Brunner, Salah (SUI)
6 July 2016; 16:00	Hansen 10	(18–7)	Najmedinova 4	USH CSKA, Moscow; Attendance: 110; Referees: Brunner, Salah (SUI)
6 July 2016; 16:00	3× (yellow card) 3× (suspension)	Report	2× (yellow card) 1× (suspension)	USH CSKA, Moscow; Attendance: 110; Referees: Brunner, Salah (SUI)

6 July 2016; 18:00	Hungary	26–21	Montenegro	USH CSKA, Moscow; Attendance: 200; Referees: Covalciuc, Covalciuc (MDA)
6 July 2016; 18:00	Elo 5	(17–11)	Novaković 5	USH CSKA, Moscow; Attendance: 200; Referees: Covalciuc, Covalciuc (MDA)
6 July 2016; 18:00	3× (yellow card) 1× (suspension)	Report	3× (yellow card) 5× (suspension)	USH CSKA, Moscow; Attendance: 200; Referees: Covalciuc, Covalciuc (MDA)

6 July 2016; 20:00	Angola	23–29	Norway	USH CSKA, Moscow; Attendance: 150; Referees: Opava, Válek (CZE)
6 July 2016; 20:00	Nenganga 7	(10–16)	Gigstad Fauske 5	USH CSKA, Moscow; Attendance: 150; Referees: Opava, Válek (CZE)
6 July 2016; 20:00	3× (yellow card) 2× (suspension)	Report	4× (yellow card) 5× (suspension)	USH CSKA, Moscow; Attendance: 150; Referees: Opava, Válek (CZE)

8 July 2016; 16:00	Hungary	24–35	Norway	USH CSKA, Moscow; Attendance: 100; Referees: Jedermann, Posch (USA)
8 July 2016; 16:00	Ferenczi, Mistina 5	(10–20)	Boge Solås 8	USH CSKA, Moscow; Attendance: 100; Referees: Jedermann, Posch (USA)
8 July 2016; 16:00	2× (yellow card) 2× (suspension)	Report	4× (yellow card) 6× (suspension)	USH CSKA, Moscow; Attendance: 100; Referees: Jedermann, Posch (USA)

8 July 2016; 18:00	Montenegro	20–24	Denmark	USH CSKA, Moscow; Attendance: 100; Referees: Erdoğan, Özdeniz (TUR)
8 July 2016; 18:00	Jovićević 7	(12–17)	Lykkegaard 6	USH CSKA, Moscow; Attendance: 100; Referees: Erdoğan, Özdeniz (TUR)
8 July 2016; 18:00	3× (yellow card) 5× (suspension)	Report	3× (yellow card) 5× (suspension)	USH CSKA, Moscow; Attendance: 100; Referees: Erdoğan, Özdeniz (TUR)

8 July 2016; 20:00	Uzbekistan	23–42	Angola	USH CSKA, Moscow; Attendance: 100; Referees: Al-Watani, Qamber (QAT)
8 July 2016; 20:00	Najmedinova 7	(9–22)	Nenganga 9	USH CSKA, Moscow; Attendance: 100; Referees: Al-Watani, Qamber (QAT)
8 July 2016; 20:00	3× (yellow card) 8× (suspension)	Report	3× (yellow card) 4× (suspension)	USH CSKA, Moscow; Attendance: 100; Referees: Al-Watani, Qamber (QAT)

9 July 2016; 16:00	Norway	54–16	Uzbekistan	USH CSKA, Moscow; Attendance: 100; Referees: Konjičanin, Konjičanin (BIH)
9 July 2016; 16:00	Hernes 9	(28–6)	Najmedinova 7	USH CSKA, Moscow; Attendance: 100; Referees: Konjičanin, Konjičanin (BIH)
9 July 2016; 16:00	3× (yellow card) 5× (suspension)	Report	3× (yellow card) 5× (suspension)	USH CSKA, Moscow; Attendance: 100; Referees: Konjičanin, Konjičanin (BIH)

9 July 2016; 18:00	Montenegro	22–22	Angola	USH CSKA, Moscow; Attendance: 100; Referees: Kurtagic, Wetterwik (SWE)
9 July 2016; 18:00	Bošnjak 6	(11–15)	Nenganga 9	USH CSKA, Moscow; Attendance: 100; Referees: Kurtagic, Wetterwik (SWE)
9 July 2016; 18:00	3× (yellow card) 6× (suspension)	Report	1× (yellow card) 2× (suspension)	USH CSKA, Moscow; Attendance: 100; Referees: Kurtagic, Wetterwik (SWE)

9 July 2016; 20:00	Denmark	28–17	Hungary	USH CSKA, Moscow; Attendance: 100; Referees: Bustamante, Álvarez (ESP)
9 July 2016; 20:00	M. Nielsen 6	(12–8)	Bouti, Szabó 3	USH CSKA, Moscow; Attendance: 100; Referees: Bustamante, Álvarez (ESP)
9 July 2016; 20:00	3× (yellow card) 1× (suspension)	Report	1× (yellow card) 7× (suspension) 2× (red card)	USH CSKA, Moscow; Attendance: 100; Referees: Bustamante, Álvarez (ESP)

=== Group B ===
Pos	Team	Pld	W	D	L	GF	GA	GD	Pts	Qualification
1	South Korea	5	5	0	0	162	132	+30	10	Quarterfinals
2	Croatia	5	4	0	1	130	115	+15	8	Quarterfinals
3	Brazil	5	2	1	2	161	147	+14	5 (Note: France 29–29 Brazil)	Quarterfinals
4	France	5	2	1	2	137	123	+14	5	Quarterfinals
5	Austria	5	1	0	4	128	141	−13	2	
6	Tunisia	5	0	0	5	110	170	−60	0	

Source: IHF
Rules for classification: 1) Points; 2) Head-to-head points; 3) Head-to-head goal difference; 4) Head-to-head goals scored; 5) Goal difference; 6) Goals scored; 7) Draw.
Notes:

3 July 2016; 10:00	South Korea	35–34	Brazil	Krylatskoye Sports Palace, Moscow; Attendance: 100; Referees: Konjičanin, Konjičanin (BIH)
3 July 2016; 10:00	Song Ji-e. 13	(15–16)	Fernandes 9	Krylatskoye Sports Palace, Moscow; Attendance: 100; Referees: Konjičanin, Konjičanin (BIH)
3 July 2016; 10:00	2× (yellow card) 3× (suspension)	Report	3× (yellow card) 3× (suspension)	Krylatskoye Sports Palace, Moscow; Attendance: 100; Referees: Konjičanin, Konjičanin (BIH)

3 July 2016; 12:00	Croatia	24–23	Austria	Krylatskoye Sports Palace, Moscow; Attendance: 100; Referees: Al-Watani, Qamber (BHR)
3 July 2016; 12:00	P. Posavec 10	(12–14)	Kovacs 10	Krylatskoye Sports Palace, Moscow; Attendance: 100; Referees: Al-Watani, Qamber (BHR)
3 July 2016; 12:00	3× (yellow card) 5× (suspension)	Report	3× (yellow card) 1× (suspension)	Krylatskoye Sports Palace, Moscow; Attendance: 100; Referees: Al-Watani, Qamber (BHR)

3 July 2016; 14:00	France	34–22	Tunisia	Krylatskoye Sports Palace, Moscow; Attendance: 200; Referees: Opava, Válek (CZE)
3 July 2016; 14:00	Kieffer, Plazanet 5.	(16–10)	Jouini 7	Krylatskoye Sports Palace, Moscow; Attendance: 200; Referees: Opava, Válek (CZE)
3 July 2016; 14:00	4× (yellow card) 3× (suspension)	Report	3× (yellow card) 4× (suspension)	Krylatskoye Sports Palace, Moscow; Attendance: 200; Referees: Opava, Válek (CZE)

5 July 2016; 16:00	Brazil	25–26	Croatia	Krylatskoye Sports Palace, Moscow; Attendance: 200; Referees: Kleven, Jørum (NOR)
5 July 2016; 16:00	Carneiro 8	(13–12)	S. Posavec 7	Krylatskoye Sports Palace, Moscow; Attendance: 200; Referees: Kleven, Jørum (NOR)
5 July 2016; 16:00	3× (yellow card) 6× (suspension)	Report	3× (yellow card) 3× (suspension)	Krylatskoye Sports Palace, Moscow; Attendance: 200; Referees: Kleven, Jørum (NOR)

5 July 2016; 18:00	Tunisia	20–38	South Korea	Krylatskoye Sports Palace, Moscow; Attendance: 100; Referees: Kurtagic, Wetterwik (SWE)
5 July 2016; 18:00	Jouini 13	(11–21)	Kim S. 7	Krylatskoye Sports Palace, Moscow; Attendance: 100; Referees: Kurtagic, Wetterwik (SWE)
5 July 2016; 18:00	3× (yellow card) 7× (suspension)	Report	3× (yellow card) 2× (suspension)	Krylatskoye Sports Palace, Moscow; Attendance: 100; Referees: Kurtagic, Wetterwik (SWE)

5 July 2016; 20:00	Austria	18–32	France	Krylatskoye Sports Palace, Moscow; Attendance: 100; Referees: Kiselev, Kiyashko (RUS)
5 July 2016; 20:00	Kovacs, Stanic 4	(7–15)	Plazanet 5	Krylatskoye Sports Palace, Moscow; Attendance: 100; Referees: Kiselev, Kiyashko (RUS)
5 July 2016; 20:00	3× (yellow card) 3× (suspension)	Report	2× (yellow card) 4× (suspension)	Krylatskoye Sports Palace, Moscow; Attendance: 100; Referees: Kiselev, Kiyashko (RUS)

6 July 2016; 14:00	Brazil	37–26	Tunisia	Krylatskoye Sports Palace, Moscow; Attendance: 100; Referees: Al-Watani, Qamber (BHR)
6 July 2016; 14:00	De Paula 8	(18–12)	Jouini 11	Krylatskoye Sports Palace, Moscow; Attendance: 100; Referees: Al-Watani, Qamber (BHR)
6 July 2016; 14:00	3× (yellow card) 5× (suspension)	Report	3× (yellow card) 2× (suspension)	Krylatskoye Sports Palace, Moscow; Attendance: 100; Referees: Al-Watani, Qamber (BHR)

6 July 2016; 16:00	South Korea	31–30	Austria	Krylatskoye Sports Palace, Moscow; Attendance: 200; Referees: Kleven, Jørum (NOR)
6 July 2016; 16:00	Kim S. 9	(15–12)	Ivančok 8	Krylatskoye Sports Palace, Moscow; Attendance: 200; Referees: Kleven, Jørum (NOR)
6 July 2016; 16:00	2× (yellow card) 2× (suspension)	Report	4× (yellow card) 5× (suspension)	Krylatskoye Sports Palace, Moscow; Attendance: 200; Referees: Kleven, Jørum (NOR)

6 July 2016; 20:00	Croatia	22–17	France	Krylatskoye Sports Palace, Moscow; Attendance: 100; Referees: Konjičanin, Konjičanin (BIH)
6 July 2016; 20:00	S. Posavec 7	(11–7)	Sajka 6	Krylatskoye Sports Palace, Moscow; Attendance: 100; Referees: Konjičanin, Konjičanin (BIH)
6 July 2016; 20:00	3× (yellow card) 6× (suspension)	Report	3× (yellow card) 5× (suspension)	Krylatskoye Sports Palace, Moscow; Attendance: 100; Referees: Konjičanin, Konjičanin (BIH)

8 July 2016; 16:00	Croatia	35–24	Tunisia	Krylatskoye Sports Palace, Moscow; Attendance: 100; Referees: Álvarez, Bustamente (ESP)
8 July 2016; 16:00	Čalušić 8	(17–8)	Dardour, Jouini 5	Krylatskoye Sports Palace, Moscow; Attendance: 100; Referees: Álvarez, Bustamente (ESP)
8 July 2016; 16:00	3× (yellow card) 4× (suspension)	Report	2× (yellow card) 3× (suspension)	Krylatskoye Sports Palace, Moscow; Attendance: 100; Referees: Álvarez, Bustamente (ESP)

8 July 2016; 18:00	France	25–32	South Korea	Krylatskoye Sports Palace, Moscow; Attendance: 100; Referees: Brunner, Salah (SUI)
8 July 2016; 18:00	Sercien 7	(12–15)	Song Ji-e. 13	Krylatskoye Sports Palace, Moscow; Attendance: 100; Referees: Brunner, Salah (SUI)
8 July 2016; 18:00	3× (yellow card) 2× (suspension)	Report	3× (yellow card) 5× (suspension) 1× (red card)	Krylatskoye Sports Palace, Moscow; Attendance: 100; Referees: Brunner, Salah (SUI)

8 July 2016; 20:00	Austria	31–36	Brazil	Krylatskoye Sports Palace, Moscow; Attendance: 100; Referees: Opava, Válek (CZE)
8 July 2016; 20:00	Kovacs 8	(18–20)	De Paula 11	Krylatskoye Sports Palace, Moscow; Attendance: 100; Referees: Opava, Válek (CZE)
8 July 2016; 20:00	3× (yellow card) 4× (suspension)	Report	2× (yellow card) 4× (suspension)	Krylatskoye Sports Palace, Moscow; Attendance: 100; Referees: Opava, Válek (CZE)

9 July 2016; 14:00	South Korea	26–23	Croatia	Krylatskoye Sports Palace, Moscow; Attendance: 100; Referees: Kiselev, Kiyashko (RUS)
9 July 2016; 14:00	Song Ji-e. 9	(17–11)	P. Posavec 6	Krylatskoye Sports Palace, Moscow; Attendance: 100; Referees: Kiselev, Kiyashko (RUS)
9 July 2016; 14:00	2× (yellow card)	Report	4× (yellow card) 3× (suspension)	Krylatskoye Sports Palace, Moscow; Attendance: 100; Referees: Kiselev, Kiyashko (RUS)

9 July 2016; 16:00	Tunisia	18–26	Austria	Krylatskoye Sports Palace, Moscow; Attendance: 100; Referees: Gonzales, Prieto (URU)
9 July 2016; 16:00	Jouini 11	(4–16)	Topic 7	Krylatskoye Sports Palace, Moscow; Attendance: 100; Referees: Gonzales, Prieto (URU)
9 July 2016; 16:00	3× (yellow card) 2× (suspension)	Report	3× (yellow card) 7× (suspension)	Krylatskoye Sports Palace, Moscow; Attendance: 100; Referees: Gonzales, Prieto (URU)

9 July 2016; 20:00	France	29–29	Brazil	Krylatskoye Sports Palace, Moscow; Attendance: 200; Referees: Jedermann, Posch (USA)
9 July 2016; 20:00	Sajka 7	(15–13)	Fernandes 15	Krylatskoye Sports Palace, Moscow; Attendance: 200; Referees: Jedermann, Posch (USA)
9 July 2016; 20:00	2× (yellow card) 1× (suspension)	Report	1× (yellow card) 6× (suspension)	Krylatskoye Sports Palace, Moscow; Attendance: 200; Referees: Jedermann, Posch (USA)

=== Group C ===
Pos	Team	Pld	W	D	L	GF	GA	GD	Pts	Qualification
1	Romania	5	4	1	0	163	94	+69	9 (Note: Romania 29–29 Germany)	Quarterfinals
2	Germany	5	4	1	0	159	97	+62	9	Quarterfinals
3	Spain	5	3	0	2	117	113	+4	6	Quarterfinals
4	Argentina	5	2	0	3	108	111	−3	4	Quarterfinals
5	Egypt	5	1	0	4	99	151	−52	2	
6	Kazakhstan	5	0	0	5	105	185	−80	0	

Source: IHF
Rules for classification: 1) Points; 2) Head-to-head points; 3) Head-to-head goal difference; 4) Head-to-head goals scored; 5) Goal difference; 6) Goals scored; 7) Draw.
Notes:

3 July 2016; 16:00	Romania	43–21	Kazakhstan	USH CSKA, Moscow; Attendance: 100; Referees: Andorcka, Hucker (HUN)
3 July 2016; 16:00	Dindiligan, Ilie 6	(18–10)	Usmanova 5	USH CSKA, Moscow; Attendance: 100; Referees: Andorcka, Hucker (HUN)
3 July 2016; 16:00	3× (yellow card) 6× (suspension)	Report	3× (yellow card)	USH CSKA, Moscow; Attendance: 100; Referees: Andorcka, Hucker (HUN)

3 July 2016; 18:00	Germany	35–15	Egypt	USH CSKA, Moscow; Attendance: 150; Referees: Mitrović, Vešović (MNE)
3 July 2016; 18:00	Ingenpass 7	(20–9)	Abdallah, Helmy 3	USH CSKA, Moscow; Attendance: 150; Referees: Mitrović, Vešović (MNE)
3 July 2016; 18:00	3× (yellow card) 5× (suspension)	Report	3× (yellow card) 4× (suspension)	USH CSKA, Moscow; Attendance: 150; Referees: Mitrović, Vešović (MNE)

3 July 2016; 20:00	Spain	26–21	Argentina	USH CSKA, Moscow; Attendance: 100; Referees: Kleven, Jørum (NOR)
3 July 2016; 20:00	Prieto 5	(12–11)	Urban 7	USH CSKA, Moscow; Attendance: 100; Referees: Kleven, Jørum (NOR)
3 July 2016; 20:00	3× (yellow card) 1× (suspension)	Report	3× (yellow card) 3× (suspension)	USH CSKA, Moscow; Attendance: 100; Referees: Kleven, Jørum (NOR)

4 July 2016; 16:00	Kazakhstan	17–43	Germany	USH CSKA, Moscow; Attendance: 100; Referees: Jedermann, Posch (USA)
4 July 2016; 16:00	Abilda, Usmanova 4	(7–26)	Behrend 7	USH CSKA, Moscow; Attendance: 100; Referees: Jedermann, Posch (USA)
4 July 2016; 16:00	3× (yellow card) 5× (suspension) 1× (red card)	Report	2× (yellow card) 4× (suspension)	USH CSKA, Moscow; Attendance: 100; Referees: Jedermann, Posch (USA)

4 July 2016; 18:00	Argentina	17–23	Romania	USH CSKA, Moscow; Attendance: 100; Referees: Erdoğan, Özdeniz (TUR)
4 July 2016; 18:00	Mazza 4	(6–17)	Laslo 6	USH CSKA, Moscow; Attendance: 100; Referees: Erdoğan, Özdeniz (TUR)
4 July 2016; 18:00	3× (yellow card) 4× (suspension)	Report	3× (yellow card) 3× (suspension)	USH CSKA, Moscow; Attendance: 100; Referees: Erdoğan, Özdeniz (TUR)

4 July 2016; 20:00	Egypt	21–30	Spain	USH CSKA, Moscow; Attendance: 110; Referees: Brunner, Salah (SUI)
4 July 2016; 20:00	N. Khaled, Sherif 4	(10–14)	Viloria 6	USH CSKA, Moscow; Attendance: 110; Referees: Brunner, Salah (SUI)
4 July 2016; 20:00	3× (yellow card) 6× (suspension)	Report	3× (yellow card) 8× (suspension)	USH CSKA, Moscow; Attendance: 110; Referees: Brunner, Salah (SUI)

6 July 2016; 10:00	Romania	38–15	Egypt	USH CSKA, Moscow; Attendance: 100; Referees: Kiselev, Kiyashko (RUS)
6 July 2016; 10:00	Ostase 7	(18–9)	N. Khaled 6	USH CSKA, Moscow; Attendance: 100; Referees: Kiselev, Kiyashko (RUS)
6 July 2016; 10:00	2× (yellow card) 3× (suspension)	Report	2× (yellow card) 2× (suspension) 1× (red card)	USH CSKA, Moscow; Attendance: 100; Referees: Kiselev, Kiyashko (RUS)

6 July 2016; 12:00	Germany	24–19	Spain	USH CSKA, Moscow; Attendance: 120; Referees: Andorcka, Hucker (HUN)
6 July 2016; 12:00	Stolle 6	(14–9)	Martínez, Prieto 5	USH CSKA, Moscow; Attendance: 120; Referees: Andorcka, Hucker (HUN)
6 July 2016; 12:00	4× (yellow card) 4× (suspension)	Report	3× (yellow card) 2× (suspension)	USH CSKA, Moscow; Attendance: 120; Referees: Andorcka, Hucker (HUN)

6 July 2016; 14:00	Kazakhstan	21–34	Argentina	USH CSKA, Moscow; Attendance: 100; Referees: Kurtagic, Wetterwik (SWE)
6 July 2016; 14:00	Usmanova 6	(10–18)	Urban 10	USH CSKA, Moscow; Attendance: 100; Referees: Kurtagic, Wetterwik (SWE)
6 July 2016; 14:00	2× (yellow card) 6× (suspension)	Report	3× (yellow card) 7× (suspension)	USH CSKA, Moscow; Attendance: 100; Referees: Kurtagic, Wetterwik (SWE)

7 July 2016; 16:00	Germany	28–17	Argentina	USH CSKA, Moscow; Attendance: 200; Referees: Alves, Magalhaes (BRA)
7 July 2016; 16:00	Grijseels 7	(11–10)	Casasola, Sans 4	USH CSKA, Moscow; Attendance: 200; Referees: Alves, Magalhaes (BRA)
7 July 2016; 16:00	3× (yellow card) 4× (suspension)	Report	2× (yellow card) 3× (suspension)	USH CSKA, Moscow; Attendance: 200; Referees: Alves, Magalhaes (BRA)

7 July 2016; 18:00	Spain	12–30	Romania	USH CSKA, Moscow; Attendance: 100; Referees: Konjičanin, Konjičanin (BIH)
7 July 2016; 18:00	Martínez, Torras 3	(6–18)	Laslo 8	USH CSKA, Moscow; Attendance: 100; Referees: Konjičanin, Konjičanin (BIH)
7 July 2016; 18:00	3× (yellow card) 3× (suspension)	Report	3× (yellow card) 5× (suspension)	USH CSKA, Moscow; Attendance: 100; Referees: Konjičanin, Konjičanin (BIH)

7 July 2016; 20:00	Egypt	35–29	Kazakhstan	USH CSKA, Moscow; Attendance: 100; Referees: Gasmi, Gasmi (FRA)
7 July 2016; 20:00	Helmy 10	(17–13)	Ussenova 6	USH CSKA, Moscow; Attendance: 100; Referees: Gasmi, Gasmi (FRA)
7 July 2016; 20:00	3× (yellow card) 5× (suspension)	Report	3× (yellow card) 3× (suspension)	USH CSKA, Moscow; Attendance: 100; Referees: Gasmi, Gasmi (FRA)

9 July 2016; 10:00	Argentina	19–13	Egypt	USH CSKA, Moscow; Attendance: 100; Referees: Al-Watani, Qamber (BHR)
9 July 2016; 10:00	Casasola 5	(9–9)	Helmy 6	USH CSKA, Moscow; Attendance: 100; Referees: Al-Watani, Qamber (BHR)
9 July 2016; 10:00	2× (yellow card) 4× (suspension) 1× (red card)	Report	3× (yellow card) 2× (suspension)	USH CSKA, Moscow; Attendance: 100; Referees: Al-Watani, Qamber (BHR)

9 July 2016; 12:00	Spain	30–17	Kazakhstan	USH CSKA, Moscow; Attendance: 100; Referees: Mitrović, Vešović (MNE)
9 July 2016; 12:00	Prieto 6	(16–11)	Usmanova 8	USH CSKA, Moscow; Attendance: 100; Referees: Mitrović, Vešović (MNE)
9 July 2016; 12:00	3× (yellow card) 4× (suspension)	Report	2× (yellow card) 3× (suspension)	USH CSKA, Moscow; Attendance: 100; Referees: Mitrović, Vešović (MNE)

9 July 2016; 14:00	Romania	29–29	Germany	USH CSKA, Moscow; Attendance: 100; Referees: Gasmi, Gasmi (FRA)
9 July 2016; 14:00	Laslo 9	(18–13)	Stolle 7	USH CSKA, Moscow; Attendance: 100; Referees: Gasmi, Gasmi (FRA)
9 July 2016; 14:00	3× (yellow card) 4× (suspension)	Report	3× (yellow card) 4× (suspension)	USH CSKA, Moscow; Attendance: 100; Referees: Gasmi, Gasmi (FRA)

=== Group D ===
Pos	Team	Pld	W	D	L	GF	GA	GD	Pts	Qualification
1	Russia	5	5	0	0	192	97	+95	10	Quarterfinals
2	Sweden	5	4	0	1	147	116	+31	8	Quarterfinals
3	Netherlands	5	3	0	2	162	137	+25	6	Quarterfinals
4	Japan	5	2	0	3	133	144	−11	4	Quarterfinals
5	China	5	1	0	4	115	159	−44	2	
6	Chile	5	0	0	5	104	200	−96	0	

Source: IHF
Rules for classification: 1) Points; 2) Head-to-head points; 3) Head-to-head goal difference; 4) Head-to-head goals scored; 5) Goal difference; 6) Goals scored; 7) Draw.

2 July 2016; 17:30	Russia	31–24	Netherlands	Krylatskoye Sports Palace, Moscow; Attendance: 700; Referees: Gasmi, Gasmi (FRA)
2 July 2016; 17:30	Skorobogatchenko 8	(13–17)	Nieuwenweg 7	Krylatskoye Sports Palace, Moscow; Attendance: 700; Referees: Gasmi, Gasmi (FRA)
2 July 2016; 17:30	3× (yellow card) 4× (suspension)	Report	3× (yellow card) 7× (suspension)	Krylatskoye Sports Palace, Moscow; Attendance: 700; Referees: Gasmi, Gasmi (FRA)

3 July 2016; 16:00	Japan	28–23	China	Krylatskoye Sports Palace, Moscow; Attendance: 200; Referees: Alves, Magalhaes (BRA)
3 July 2016; 16:00	Ao 8	(15–12)	Mu, Zhang Y. 6	Krylatskoye Sports Palace, Moscow; Attendance: 200; Referees: Alves, Magalhaes (BRA)
3 July 2016; 16:00	2× (yellow card) 2× (suspension)	Report	1× (yellow card) 2× (suspension)	Krylatskoye Sports Palace, Moscow; Attendance: 200; Referees: Alves, Magalhaes (BRA)

3 July 2016; 18:00	Sweden	41–19	Chile	Krylatskoye Sports Palace, Moscow; Attendance: 200; Referees: Covalciuc, Covalciuc (MDA)
3 July 2016; 18:00	Bardis, Rask 6	(19–9)	Mino 6	Krylatskoye Sports Palace, Moscow; Attendance: 200; Referees: Covalciuc, Covalciuc (MDA)
3 July 2016; 18:00	2× (yellow card) 2× (suspension)	Report	4× (yellow card) 4× (suspension) 1× (red card)	Krylatskoye Sports Palace, Moscow; Attendance: 200; Referees: Covalciuc, Covalciuc (MDA)

4 July 2016; 16:00	Netherlands	28–34	Sweden	Krylatskoye Sports Palace, Moscow; Attendance: 200; Referees: Andorcka, Hucker (HUN)
4 July 2016; 16:00	Zwinkels 10	(15–19)	Bardis 9	Krylatskoye Sports Palace, Moscow; Attendance: 200; Referees: Andorcka, Hucker (HUN)
4 July 2016; 16:00	3× (yellow card) 6× (suspension)	Report	2× (yellow card) 6× (suspension)	Krylatskoye Sports Palace, Moscow; Attendance: 200; Referees: Andorcka, Hucker (HUN)

4 July 2016; 18:00	China	19–39	Russia	Krylatskoye Sports Palace, Moscow; Attendance: 200; Referees: Gonzales, Prieto (URU)
4 July 2016; 18:00	Lin, Tian 4	(9–23)	Frolova 8	Krylatskoye Sports Palace, Moscow; Attendance: 200; Referees: Gonzales, Prieto (URU)
4 July 2016; 18:00	2× (yellow card) 1× (suspension)	Report	3× (yellow card) 5× (suspension) 1× (red card)	Krylatskoye Sports Palace, Moscow; Attendance: 200; Referees: Gonzales, Prieto (URU)

4 July 2016; 20:00	Chile	21–39	Japan	Krylatskoye Sports Palace, Moscow; Attendance: 100; Referees: Mitrović, Vešović (MNE)
4 July 2016; 20:00	Mino, Zavala 5	(8–18)	Magata 8	Krylatskoye Sports Palace, Moscow; Attendance: 100; Referees: Mitrović, Vešović (MNE)
4 July 2016; 20:00	3× (yellow card) 2× (suspension)	Report	3× (yellow card) 1× (suspension)	Krylatskoye Sports Palace, Moscow; Attendance: 100; Referees: Mitrović, Vešović (MNE)

6 July 2016; 10:00	Sweden	26–18	Japan	Krylatskoye Sports Palace, Moscow; Attendance: 100; Referees: Bustamente, Álvarez (ESP)
6 July 2016; 10:00	Mellegård 5	(11–10)	Ao, Kawarabata 4	Krylatskoye Sports Palace, Moscow; Attendance: 100; Referees: Bustamente, Álvarez (ESP)
6 July 2016; 10:00	3× (yellow card) 4× (suspension)	Report	3× (yellow card) 2× (suspension)	Krylatskoye Sports Palace, Moscow; Attendance: 100; Referees: Bustamente, Álvarez (ESP)

6 July 2016; 12:00	Netherlands	38–22	China	Krylatskoye Sports Palace, Moscow; Attendance: 100; Referees: Erdoğan, Özdeniz (TUR)
6 July 2016; 12:00	Belgareh 12	(20–10)	Lin 10	Krylatskoye Sports Palace, Moscow; Attendance: 100; Referees: Erdoğan, Özdeniz (TUR)
6 July 2016; 12:00	3× (yellow card) 1× (suspension)	Report	2× (yellow card) 3× (suspension)	Krylatskoye Sports Palace, Moscow; Attendance: 100; Referees: Erdoğan, Özdeniz (TUR)

6 July 2016; 18:00	Russia	48–10	Chile	Krylatskoye Sports Palace, Moscow; Attendance: 200; Referees: Jedermann, Posch (USA)
6 July 2016; 18:00	Sabirova, Smolentseva 6	(26–5)	Zavala 4	Krylatskoye Sports Palace, Moscow; Attendance: 200; Referees: Jedermann, Posch (USA)
6 July 2016; 18:00	3× (yellow card) 1× (suspension)	Report	2× (yellow card) 4× (suspension)	Krylatskoye Sports Palace, Moscow; Attendance: 200; Referees: Jedermann, Posch (USA)

7 July 2016; 16:00	Sweden	25–20	China	Krylatskoye Sports Palace, Moscow; Attendance: 100; Referees: Mitrović, Vešović (MNE)
7 July 2016; 16:00	three players 5	(12–10)	Lin 11	Krylatskoye Sports Palace, Moscow; Attendance: 100; Referees: Mitrović, Vešović (MNE)
7 July 2016; 16:00	3× (yellow card) 3× (suspension)	Report	3× (yellow card) 2× (suspension)	Krylatskoye Sports Palace, Moscow; Attendance: 100; Referees: Mitrović, Vešović (MNE)

7 July 2016; 18:00	Japan	23–43	Russia	Krylatskoye Sports Palace, Moscow; Attendance: 300; Referees: Covalciuc, Covalciuc (MDA)
7 July 2016; 18:00	Ao, Magata 5	(9–18)	Belikova, Frolova 7	Krylatskoye Sports Palace, Moscow; Attendance: 300; Referees: Covalciuc, Covalciuc (MDA)
7 July 2016; 18:00	2× (yellow card) 1× (suspension)	Report	3× (yellow card) 6× (suspension)	Krylatskoye Sports Palace, Moscow; Attendance: 300; Referees: Covalciuc, Covalciuc (MDA)

7 July 2016; 20:00	Chile	25–41	Netherlands	Krylatskoye Sports Palace, Moscow; Attendance: 100; Referees: Gonzales, Prieto (URU)
7 July 2016; 20:00	Mino 6	(9–20)	Nieuwenweg 8	Krylatskoye Sports Palace, Moscow; Attendance: 100; Referees: Gonzales, Prieto (URU)
7 July 2016; 20:00	2× (yellow card) 3× (suspension)	Report	3× (yellow card) 2× (suspension)	Krylatskoye Sports Palace, Moscow; Attendance: 100; Referees: Gonzales, Prieto (URU)

9 July 2016; 10:00	China	31–29	Chile	Krylatskoye Sports Palace, Moscow; Attendance: 100; Referees: Andorcka, Hucker (HUN)
9 July 2016; 10:00	Tian 12	(18–12)	Mino 7	Krylatskoye Sports Palace, Moscow; Attendance: 100; Referees: Andorcka, Hucker (HUN)
9 July 2016; 10:00	3× (yellow card) 3× (suspension)	Report	3× (yellow card) 5× (suspension)	Krylatskoye Sports Palace, Moscow; Attendance: 100; Referees: Andorcka, Hucker (HUN)

9 July 2016; 12:00	Japan	25–31	Netherlands	Krylatskoye Sports Palace, Moscow; Attendance: 100; Referees: Kleven, Jørum (NOR)
9 July 2016; 12:00	Ao 7	(10–17)	Nüsser 7	Krylatskoye Sports Palace, Moscow; Attendance: 100; Referees: Kleven, Jørum (NOR)
9 July 2016; 12:00	2× (yellow card)	Report	2× (yellow card) 3× (suspension)	Krylatskoye Sports Palace, Moscow; Attendance: 100; Referees: Kleven, Jørum (NOR)

9 July 2016; 18:00	Russia	31–21	Sweden	Krylatskoye Sports Palace, Moscow; Attendance: 400; Referees: Alves, Magalhaes (BRA)
9 July 2016; 18:00	Golikova 6	(17–11)	Mellegård 7	Krylatskoye Sports Palace, Moscow; Attendance: 400; Referees: Alves, Magalhaes (BRA)
9 July 2016; 18:00	3× (yellow card) 7× (suspension)	Report	3× (yellow card) 4× (suspension)	Krylatskoye Sports Palace, Moscow; Attendance: 400; Referees: Alves, Magalhaes (BRA)

== President's Cup ==
=== 21st place bracket ===
21st–24th place semifinals
11 July
Uzbekistan	20
Tunisia	33
11 July
Kazakhstan	34
Chile	35

21st place
12 July
Tunisia	33
Chile	19
23rd place
12 July
Uzbekistan	31
Kazakhstan	34

==== 21st–24th place semifinals ====
11 July 2016; 09:30	Uzbekistan	20–33	Tunisia	USH CSKA, Moscow; Attendance: 100; Referees: Al-Watani, Qamber (BHR)
11 July 2016; 09:30	Najmedinova 5	(10–13)	Jouini 12	USH CSKA, Moscow; Attendance: 100; Referees: Al-Watani, Qamber (BHR)
11 July 2016; 09:30	3× (yellow card) 4× (suspension)	Report	2× (yellow card) 6× (suspension)	USH CSKA, Moscow; Attendance: 100; Referees: Al-Watani, Qamber (BHR)

11 July 2016; 09:30	Kazakhstan	34–35	Chile	Krylatskoye Sports Palace, Moscow; Attendance: 100; Referees: Gasmi, Gasmi (FRA)
11 July 2016; 09:30	Usmanova 11	(19–16)	Zavala 7	Krylatskoye Sports Palace, Moscow; Attendance: 100; Referees: Gasmi, Gasmi (FRA)
11 July 2016; 09:30	3× (yellow card) 5× (suspension)	Report	4× (yellow card) 6× (suspension)	Krylatskoye Sports Palace, Moscow; Attendance: 100; Referees: Gasmi, Gasmi (FRA)

==== 23rd place game ====
12 July 2016; 09:30	Uzbekistan	31–34	Kazakhstan	Krylatskoye Sports Palace, Moscow; Attendance: 200; Referees: Jedermann, Posch (USA)
12 July 2016; 09:30	Abdulhamidova 12	(14–17)	Abilda 11	Krylatskoye Sports Palace, Moscow; Attendance: 200; Referees: Jedermann, Posch (USA)
12 July 2016; 09:30	3× (yellow card) 7× (suspension)	Report	2× (yellow card) 3× (suspension)	Krylatskoye Sports Palace, Moscow; Attendance: 200; Referees: Jedermann, Posch (USA)

==== 21st place game ====
12 July 2016; 11:45	Tunisia	33–19	Chile	Krylatskoye Sports Palace, Moscow; Attendance: 100; Referees: Erdoğan, Özdeniz (TUR)
12 July 2016; 11:45	Jouini 9	(18–9)	four players 4	Krylatskoye Sports Palace, Moscow; Attendance: 100; Referees: Erdoğan, Özdeniz (TUR)
12 July 2016; 11:45	3× (yellow card) 1× (suspension)	Report	3× (yellow card) 3× (suspension)	Krylatskoye Sports Palace, Moscow; Attendance: 100; Referees: Erdoğan, Özdeniz (TUR)

=== 17th place bracket ===
17–20th place semifinals
11 July
Montenegro	30
Austria	25
11 July
Egypt	21
China	34

17th place
12 July
Montenegro	27
China	23
19th place
12 July
Austria	31
Egypt	22

==== 17–20th place semifinals ====
11 July 2016; 11:45	Montenegro	30–25	Austria	USH CSKA, Moscow; Attendance: 100; Referees: Kleven, Jørum (NOR)
11 July 2016; 11:45	Agović, Brnovič 7	(11–10)	Kovacs 10	USH CSKA, Moscow; Attendance: 100; Referees: Kleven, Jørum (NOR)
11 July 2016; 11:45	2× (yellow card) 5× (suspension)	Report	3× (yellow card) 4× (suspension)	USH CSKA, Moscow; Attendance: 100; Referees: Kleven, Jørum (NOR)

11 July 2016; 11:45	Egypt	21–34	China	Krylatskoye Sports Palace, Moscow; Attendance: 100; Referees: Erdoğan, Özdeniz (TUR)
11 July 2016; 11:45	Helmy 5	(9–17)	Lin 9	Krylatskoye Sports Palace, Moscow; Attendance: 100; Referees: Erdoğan, Özdeniz (TUR)
11 July 2016; 11:45	2× (yellow card) 4× (suspension)	Report	3× (yellow card) 5× (suspension) 1× (red card)	Krylatskoye Sports Palace, Moscow; Attendance: 100; Referees: Erdoğan, Özdeniz (TUR)

==== 19th place game ====
12 July 2016; 09:30	Austria	31–22	Egypt	USH CSKA, Moscow; Attendance: 100; Referees: Andorcka, Hucker (HUN)
12 July 2016; 09:30	Ivančok 8	(14–9)	N. Khaled 6	USH CSKA, Moscow; Attendance: 100; Referees: Andorcka, Hucker (HUN)
12 July 2016; 09:30	2× (yellow card) 5× (suspension)	Report	3× (yellow card) 5× (suspension)	USH CSKA, Moscow; Attendance: 100; Referees: Andorcka, Hucker (HUN)

==== 17th place game ====
12 July 2016; 11:45	Montenegro	27–23	China	USH CSKA, Moscow; Attendance: 200; Referees: Opava, Válek (CZE)
12 July 2016; 11:45	Novaković, Ujkić 5	(12–11)	Tian 7	USH CSKA, Moscow; Attendance: 200; Referees: Opava, Válek (CZE)
12 July 2016; 11:45	3× (yellow card) 6× (suspension) 1× (red card)	Report	2× (yellow card) 3× (suspension)	USH CSKA, Moscow; Attendance: 200; Referees: Opava, Válek (CZE)

== 9–16th placement games ==
The eight losers of the round of 16 were seeded according to their results in the preliminary round against teams ranked 1–4.

=== Ranking ===
Pos	Team	Pld	W	D	L	GF	GA	GD	Pts
1	Netherlands	3	1	0	2	83	90	−7	2
2	Hungary	3	1	0	2	74	85	−11	2
3	Spain	3	1	0	2	57	75	−18	2
4	Brazil	3	0	1	2	88	90	−2	1
5	France	3	0	1	2	71	83	−12	1
6	Angola	3	0	0	3	69	90	−21	0
7	Argentina	3	0	0	3	55	77	−22	0
8	Japan	3	0	0	3	66	100	−34	0

Source: IHF
Rules for classification: 1) points; 2) goal difference; 3) number of goals scored.

=== 15th place game ===
12 July 2016; 14:00	Argentina	24–28	Japan	Krylatskoye Sports Palace, Moscow; Attendance: 100; Referees: Al-Watani, Qamber (BHR)
12 July 2016; 14:00	Urban 8	(14–15)	Fujita, Watanabe 6	Krylatskoye Sports Palace, Moscow; Attendance: 100; Referees: Al-Watani, Qamber (BHR)
12 July 2016; 14:00	3× (yellow card) 2× (suspension)	Report	3× (yellow card) 3× (suspension)	Krylatskoye Sports Palace, Moscow; Attendance: 100; Referees: Al-Watani, Qamber (BHR)

=== 13th place game ===
12 July 2016; 16:15	France	35–23	Angola	Krylatskoye Sports Palace, Moscow; Attendance: 100; Referees: Konjičanin, Konjičanin (BIH)
12 July 2016; 16:15	Sercien 8	(15–9)	Nenganga 11	Krylatskoye Sports Palace, Moscow; Attendance: 100; Referees: Konjičanin, Konjičanin (BIH)
12 July 2016; 16:15	3× (yellow card) 4× (suspension) 1× (red card)	Report	2× (yellow card) 3× (suspension)	Krylatskoye Sports Palace, Moscow; Attendance: 100; Referees: Konjičanin, Konjičanin (BIH)

=== Eleventh place game ===
12 July 2016; 14:00	Spain	25–33	Brazil	USH CSKA, Moscow; Attendance: 100; Referees: Gonzales, Prieto (URU)
12 July 2016; 14:00	Echeverria 5	(11–15)	De Paula 9	USH CSKA, Moscow; Attendance: 100; Referees: Gonzales, Prieto (URU)
12 July 2016; 14:00	1× (yellow card) 2× (suspension)	Report	3× (yellow card) 3× (suspension)	USH CSKA, Moscow; Attendance: 100; Referees: Gonzales, Prieto (URU)

=== Ninth place game ===
12 July 2016
16:15
Netherlands
38–37
Hungary
USH CSKA, Moscow
Attendance: 200
Referees: Alves, Magalhaes (BRA)
Belgareh 9
(17–15)
Tóth 14
3× (yellow card) 7× (suspension) 1× (red card)
Report
3× (yellow card) 5× (suspension)

FT: 30–30 Pen: 8–7

== Knockout stage ==
=== Bracket ===
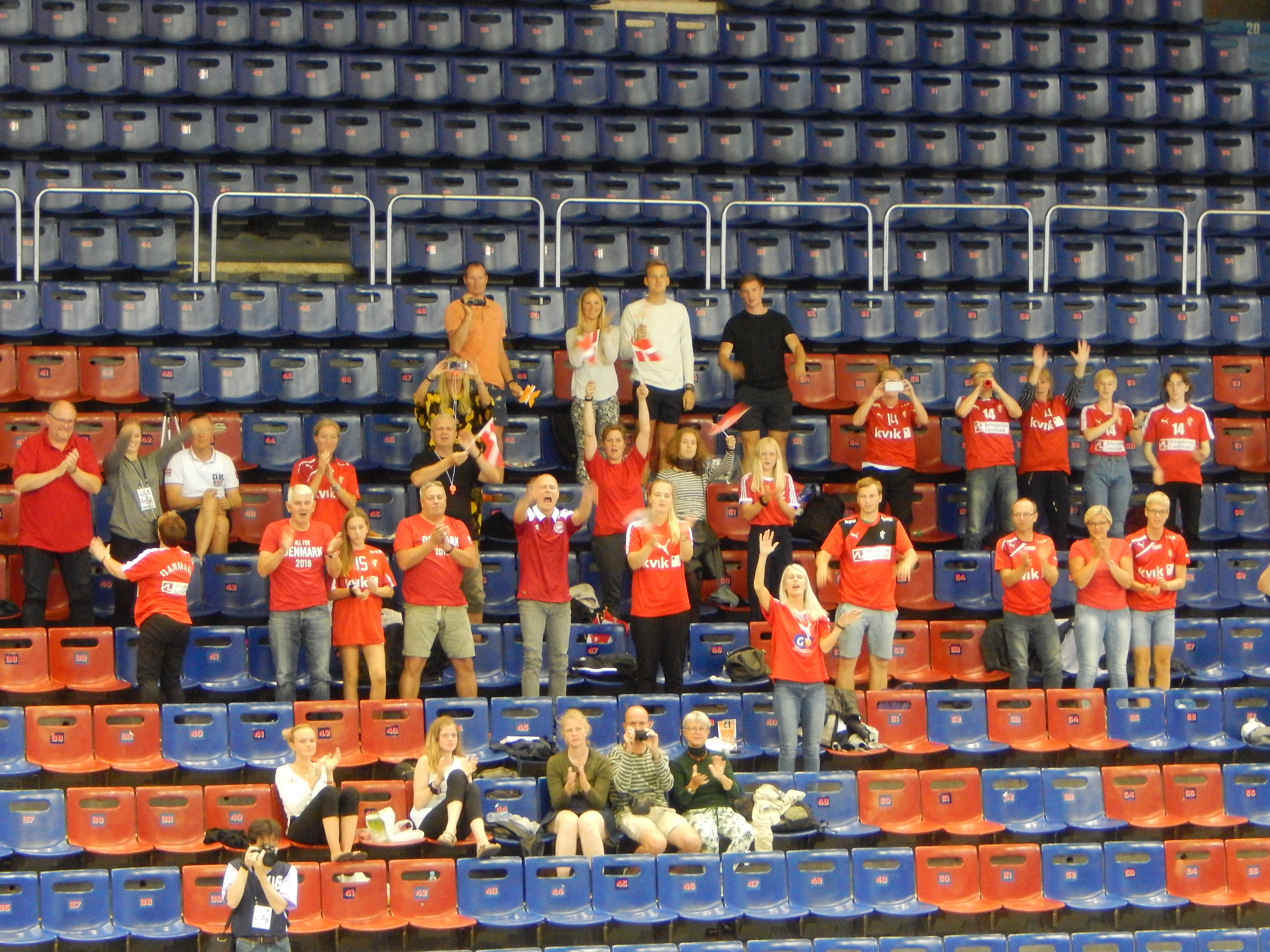
Spectacors from Denmark supports their team in USH CSKA (July 8)

Round of 16
11 July
Denmark	35
France	18
11 July
Sweden	29
Spain	13
11 July
Croatia	26
Hungary	25
11 July
Romania	32
Japan	31
11 July
South Korea	29
Angola	27
11 July
Germany	28
Netherlands	27
11 July
Norway	30
Brazil	23
11 July
Russia	31
Argentina	20

Quarterfinals
12 July
Denmark	22
Sweden	15
12 July
Croatia	20
Romania	21
12 July
South Korea	37
Germany (Pen.)	38
12 July
Norway	24
Russia	35

Semifinals
14 July
Denmark	28
Romania	25
14 July
Germany	25
Russia	32

Final
15 July
Denmark (OT)	32
Russia	28
Third place
15 July
Romania	26
Germany	25

5th place bracket

5th–8th place semifinals
14 July
Sweden	31
Croatia	24
14 July
South Korea	24
Norway	29

Fifth place
15 July
Sweden	22
Norway	32
Seventh place
15 July
Croatia	30
South Korea	32

=== Round of 16 ===
11 July 2016; 14:00	South Korea	29–27	Angola	USH CSKA, Moscow; Attendance: 400; Referees: Opava, Válek (CZE)
11 July 2016; 14:00	Song Ji-e. 15	(16–13)	Nenganga 8	USH CSKA, Moscow; Attendance: 400; Referees: Opava, Válek (CZE)
11 July 2016; 14:00	3× (yellow card) 5× (suspension)	Report	3× (yellow card) 4× (suspension)	USH CSKA, Moscow; Attendance: 400; Referees: Opava, Válek (CZE)

11 July 2016; 14:00	Spain	13–29	Sweden	Krylatskoye Sports Palace, Moscow; Attendance: 100; Referees: Jedermann, Posch (USA)
11 July 2016; 14:00	Lizarbe, Torras 3	(5–14)	Bardis 7	Krylatskoye Sports Palace, Moscow; Attendance: 100; Referees: Jedermann, Posch (USA)
11 July 2016; 14:00	2× (yellow card) 3× (suspension)	Report	2× (yellow card) 5× (suspension)	Krylatskoye Sports Palace, Moscow; Attendance: 100; Referees: Jedermann, Posch (USA)

11 July 2016; 16:15	Netherlands	27–28	Germany	USH CSKA, Moscow; Attendance: 200; Referees: Andorcka, Hucker (HUN)
11 July 2016; 16:15	Nieuwenweg 6	(12–14)	Grijseels 9	USH CSKA, Moscow; Attendance: 200; Referees: Andorcka, Hucker (HUN)
11 July 2016; 16:15	3× (yellow card) 2× (suspension)	Report	2× (yellow card) 7× (suspension) 1× (red card)	USH CSKA, Moscow; Attendance: 200; Referees: Andorcka, Hucker (HUN)

11 July 2016; 16:15	Denmark	35–18	France	Krylatskoye Sports Palace, Moscow; Attendance: 200; Referees: Mitrović, Vešović (MNE)
11 July 2016; 16:15	M. Nielsen, Nolsøe 7	(18–9)	Nianh 7	Krylatskoye Sports Palace, Moscow; Attendance: 200; Referees: Mitrović, Vešović (MNE)
11 July 2016; 16:15	3× (yellow card) 5× (suspension)	Report	3× (yellow card) 4× (suspension)	Krylatskoye Sports Palace, Moscow; Attendance: 200; Referees: Mitrović, Vešović (MNE)

11 July 2016; 18:30	Brazil	23–30	Norway	USH CSKA, Moscow; Attendance: 300; Referees: Covalciuc, Covalciuc (MDA)
11 July 2016; 18:30	De Paula 8	(10–14)	Andersen 9	USH CSKA, Moscow; Attendance: 300; Referees: Covalciuc, Covalciuc (MDA)
11 July 2016; 18:30	3× (yellow card) 3× (suspension)	Report	3× (yellow card) 3× (suspension)	USH CSKA, Moscow; Attendance: 300; Referees: Covalciuc, Covalciuc (MDA)

11 July 2016; 18:30	Russia	31–20	Argentina	Krylatskoye Sports Palace, Moscow; Attendance: 200; Referees: Gonzales, Prieto (URU)
11 July 2016; 18:30	Skorobogatchenko 7	(14–10)	Urban 6	Krylatskoye Sports Palace, Moscow; Attendance: 200; Referees: Gonzales, Prieto (URU)
11 July 2016; 18:30	3× (yellow card) 6× (suspension)	Report	2× (yellow card) 4× (suspension)	Krylatskoye Sports Palace, Moscow; Attendance: 200; Referees: Gonzales, Prieto (URU)

11 July 2016; 20:45	Hungary	25–26	Croatia	USH CSKA, Moscow; Attendance: 100; Referees: Kiselev, Kiyashko (RUS)
11 July 2016; 20:45	Tóth 6	(13–13)	S. Posavec 11	USH CSKA, Moscow; Attendance: 100; Referees: Kiselev, Kiyashko (RUS)
11 July 2016; 20:45	4× (yellow card) 2× (suspension)	Report	3× (yellow card) 4× (suspension)	USH CSKA, Moscow; Attendance: 100; Referees: Kiselev, Kiyashko (RUS)

11 July 2016; 20:45	Romania	32–31	Japan	Krylatskoye Sports Palace, Moscow; Attendance: 100; Referees: Alves, Magalhaes (BRA)
11 July 2016; 20:45	Laslo 7	(16–13)	Fujita 9	Krylatskoye Sports Palace, Moscow; Attendance: 100; Referees: Alves, Magalhaes (BRA)
11 July 2016; 20:45	1× (yellow card) 5× (suspension)	Report	3× (yellow card) 4× (suspension)	Krylatskoye Sports Palace, Moscow; Attendance: 100; Referees: Alves, Magalhaes (BRA)

=== Quarterfinals ===
12 July 2016
18:30
South Korea
37–38 (ET)
Germany
USH CSKA, Moscow
Attendance: 300
Referees: Kurtagic, Wetterwik (SWE)
Hur 11
(16–14)
Reimer 9
2× (yellow card) 6× (suspension)
Report
3× (yellow card) 7× (suspension)

FT: 26–26 ET: 4–4, 3–3 Pen: 3–4

12 July 2016; 18:30	Norway	24–35	Russia	Krylatskoye Sports Palace, Moscow; Attendance: 250; Referees: Brunner, Salah (SUI)
12 July 2016; 18:30	Hernes, Boge Solås 5	(14–16)	Skorobogatchenko 7	Krylatskoye Sports Palace, Moscow; Attendance: 250; Referees: Brunner, Salah (SUI)
12 July 2016; 18:30	3× (yellow card) 5× (suspension)	Report	3× (yellow card) 7× (suspension)	Krylatskoye Sports Palace, Moscow; Attendance: 250; Referees: Brunner, Salah (SUI)

12 July 2016; 20:45	Denmark	22–15	Sweden	USH CSKA, Moscow; Attendance: 200; Referees: Kleven, Jørum (NOR)
12 July 2016; 20:45	Hansen 6	(7–7)	Bardis 4	USH CSKA, Moscow; Attendance: 200; Referees: Kleven, Jørum (NOR)
12 July 2016; 20:45	3× (yellow card) 5× (suspension)	Report	2× (yellow card) 4× (suspension)	USH CSKA, Moscow; Attendance: 200; Referees: Kleven, Jørum (NOR)

12 July 2016; 20:45	Croatia	20–21	Romania	Krylatskoye Sports Palace, Moscow; Attendance: 100; Referees: Álvarez, Bustamente (ESP)
12 July 2016; 20:45	P. Posavec 6	(10–11)	Ilie 8	Krylatskoye Sports Palace, Moscow; Attendance: 100; Referees: Álvarez, Bustamente (ESP)
12 July 2016; 20:45	2× (yellow card) 2× (suspension)	Report	3× (yellow card) 6× (suspension)	Krylatskoye Sports Palace, Moscow; Attendance: 100; Referees: Álvarez, Bustamente (ESP)

=== 5–8th place semifinals ===
14 July 2016; 12:30	South Korea	24–29	Norway	Krylatskoye Sports Palace, Moscow; Attendance: 200; Referees: Covalciuc, Covalciuc (MDA)
14 July 2016; 12:30	Song Ji-e. 8	(13–14)	Hernes 8	Krylatskoye Sports Palace, Moscow; Attendance: 200; Referees: Covalciuc, Covalciuc (MDA)
14 July 2016; 12:30	3× (yellow card) 1× (suspension)	Report	3× (yellow card) 4× (suspension)	Krylatskoye Sports Palace, Moscow; Attendance: 200; Referees: Covalciuc, Covalciuc (MDA)

14 July 2016; 15:00	Sweden	31–24	Croatia	Krylatskoye Sports Palace, Moscow; Attendance: 300; Referees: Kiselev, Kiyashko (RUS)
14 July 2016; 15:00	Bardis 11	(16–13)	Kalaus 7	Krylatskoye Sports Palace, Moscow; Attendance: 300; Referees: Kiselev, Kiyashko (RUS)
14 July 2016; 15:00	3× (yellow card) 5× (suspension)	Report	2× (yellow card) 4× (suspension)	Krylatskoye Sports Palace, Moscow; Attendance: 300; Referees: Kiselev, Kiyashko (RUS)

=== Semifinals ===
14 July 2016; 17:30	Germany	25–32	Russia	Krylatskoye Sports Palace, Moscow; Attendance: 500; Referees: Gasmi, Gasmi (FRA)
14 July 2016; 17:30	Ruthenbeck 7	(12–19)	Frolova, Skorobogatchenko 6	Krylatskoye Sports Palace, Moscow; Attendance: 500; Referees: Gasmi, Gasmi (FRA)
14 July 2016; 17:30	3× (yellow card) 3× (suspension)	Report	3× (yellow card) 6× (suspension)	Krylatskoye Sports Palace, Moscow; Attendance: 500; Referees: Gasmi, Gasmi (FRA)

14 July 2016; 20:00	Denmark	28–25	Romania	Krylatskoye Sports Palace, Moscow; Attendance: 300; Referees: Konjičanin, Konjičanin (BIH)
14 July 2016; 20:00	Nolsøe 8	(14–12)	Laslo 8	Krylatskoye Sports Palace, Moscow; Attendance: 300; Referees: Konjičanin, Konjičanin (BIH)
14 July 2016; 20:00	3× (yellow card) 4× (suspension)	Report	3× (yellow card) 4× (suspension)	Krylatskoye Sports Palace, Moscow; Attendance: 300; Referees: Konjičanin, Konjičanin (BIH)

=== Seventh place game ===
15 July 2016; 10:30	Croatia	30–32	South Korea	Krylatskoye Sports Palace, Moscow; Attendance: 200; Referees: Kurtagic, Wetterwik (SWE)
15 July 2016; 10:30	P. Posavec 10	(16–16)	Hur 8	Krylatskoye Sports Palace, Moscow; Attendance: 200; Referees: Kurtagic, Wetterwik (SWE)
15 July 2016; 10:30	3× (yellow card) 6× (suspension)	Report	2× (yellow card) 1× (suspension)	Krylatskoye Sports Palace, Moscow; Attendance: 200; Referees: Kurtagic, Wetterwik (SWE)

=== Fifth place game ===
15 July 2016; 13:00	Sweden	22–32	Norway	Krylatskoye Sports Palace, Moscow; Attendance: 400; Referees: Mitrović, Vešović (MNE)
15 July 2016; 13:00	Bardis 5	(12–14)	Hernes 10	Krylatskoye Sports Palace, Moscow; Attendance: 400; Referees: Mitrović, Vešović (MNE)
15 July 2016; 13:00	4× (yellow card) 3× (suspension)	Report	3× (yellow card) 3× (suspension)	Krylatskoye Sports Palace, Moscow; Attendance: 400; Referees: Mitrović, Vešović (MNE)

=== Third place game ===
15 July 2016; 15:30	Romania	26–25	Germany	Krylatskoye Sports Palace, Moscow; Attendance: 500; Referees: Bustamente, Álvarez (ESP)
15 July 2016; 15:30	Laslo 12	(17–10)	Ruthenbeck 6	Krylatskoye Sports Palace, Moscow; Attendance: 500; Referees: Bustamente, Álvarez (ESP)
15 July 2016; 15:30	4× (yellow card) 4× (suspension)	Report	1× (yellow card) 10× (suspension) 2× (red card)	Krylatskoye Sports Palace, Moscow; Attendance: 500; Referees: Bustamente, Álvarez (ESP)

=== Final ===
15 July 2016
18:00
Denmark
32–28 (ET)
Russia
Krylatskoye Sports Palace, Moscow
Attendance: 1,000
Referees: Brunner, Salah (SUI)
M. Nielsen 8
(15–12)
Skorobogatchenko 7
2× (yellow card) 4× (suspension)
Report
3× (yellow card) 10× (suspension) 1× (red card)

FT: 28–28 ET: 4–0

== Final ranking ==
Rank	Team
Gold medal	Denmark
Silver medal	Russia
Bronze medal	Romania
4	Germany
5	Norway
6	Sweden
7	South Korea
8	Croatia
9	Netherlands
10	Hungary
11	Brazil
12	Spain
13	France
14	Angola
15	Japan
16	Argentina
17	Montenegro
18	China
19	Austria
20	Egypt
21	Tunisia
22	Chile
23	Kazakhstan
24	Uzbekistan

2016 Women's Junior World Champions

Denmark
Second title

Team roster: Althea Reinhardt, Pauline Bøgelund, Amalie Grøn Hansen, Julie Pontoppidan, Ronja Johansen, Celine Lundbye Kristiansen, Stine Holm, Ida Vium, Sofie Flader, Mai Kragballe Nielsen, Annika Jakobsen, Maria Lykkegaard, Sara Hald, Line Skak, Mie Højlund, Lærke Nolsøe, Josefine Dragenberg.
Head coach: Flemming Larsen.

== Awards ==
- MVP : (Russia) Yaroslava Frolova
- Top Goalscorer : (South Korea) Song Ji-eun (85 goals)

All-Star Team is

- Goalkeeper : (Denmark) Althea Reinhardt
- Right wing : (Norway) Mathilde Rivas Toft
- Right back : (Russia) Antonina Skorobogatchenko
- Centre back : (Romania) Cristina Laslo
- Left back : (Russia) Yulia Golikova
- Left wing : (Denmark) Lærke Nolsøe
- Pivot : (Germany) Annika Ingenpaß
