= Sabrina Fiore =

Paraguayan handball player (born 1996)

Personal information
- Full name: Sabrina Conce Fiore; Canata Morinigo
- Nationality: Paraguayan
- Born: 17 April 1996 (age 30)
- Height: 1.75 m (5 ft 9 in)

Sport
- Sport: Handball
- Position: Pivot
- Current club: UnC Concórdia
National team
Years	Team	Apps	(Gls)
–	Paraguay	150	(56)
Medal record
Pan American Championship
Bronze medal – third place	2017 Argentina
South American Games
Silver medal – second place	2026 Santa Fe	Team
Bolivarian Games
Gold medal – first place	2013 Trujillo	Team

Sabrina Conce Fiore Canata Morinigo (born 17 April 1996) is a Paraguayan handball player for UnC Concórdia and the Paraguay national team.

She represented Paraguay at the 2013 World Women's Handball Championship in Serbia, where the Paraguayan team placed 21st.

== Titles ==
- Super Globe:
  - 2019:
- South and Central America Women's Club Handball Championship:
  - 2019
- Brazilian Handball League:
  - 2017,2018

== Individual awards ==
- 2017 Pan American Women's Handball Championship: Top scorer
