= Isaura Menin =

Brazilian handball player (born 1994)

Personal information
- Born: 1 June 1994 (age 32) Concórdia, Brazil
- Height: 1.85 m (6 ft 1 in)

Sport
- Sport: Handball
- Position: Pivot
- Current club: Rincón Fertilidad Málaga
- Number: 3
National team
Years	Team	Apps	(Gls)
–	Brazil	17	(9)
Medal record
South and Central American Championship
Gold medal – first place	2021 Paraguay

Isaura Menin (born 1 June 1994) is a Brazilian handballer for Rincón Fertilidad Málaga and the Brazilian national team.

== Clubs Titles ==
- Liga Nacional de Handebol Feminino 2018: UnC Concórdia
