= 2019 IHF Women's Super Globe =

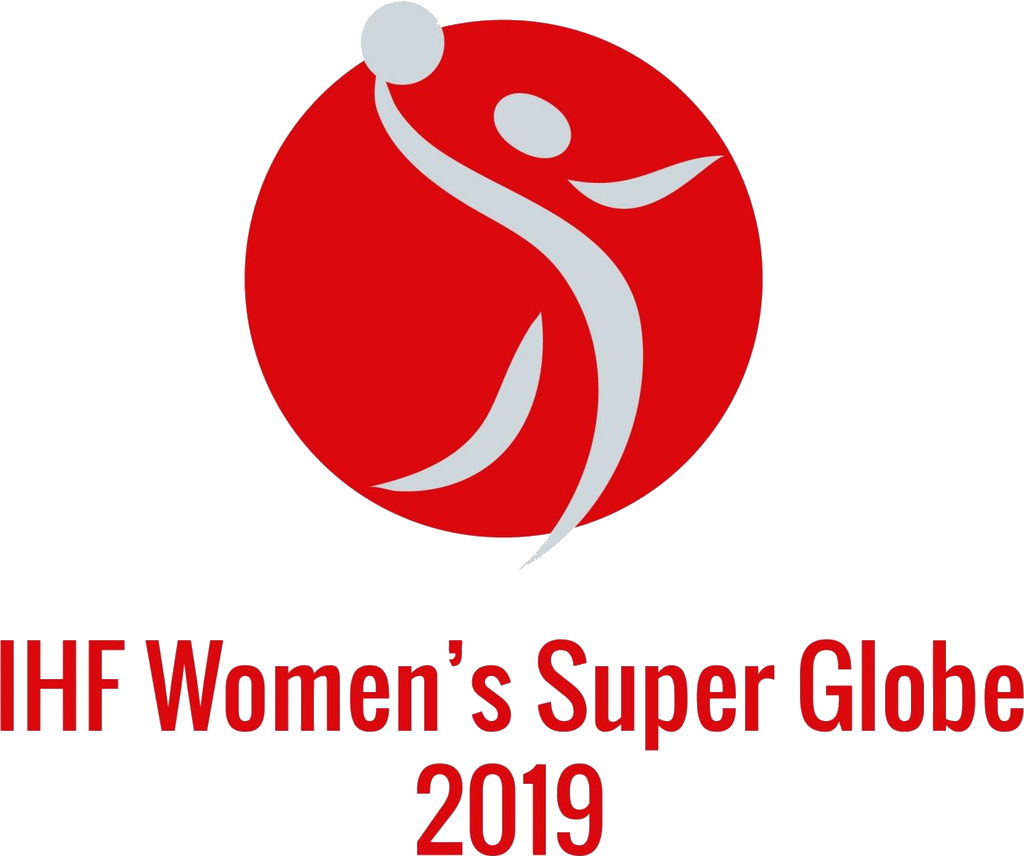

Tournament details
- Host country: China
- Venue: 1 (in 1 host city)
- Dates: 1–4 August
- Teams: 8 (from 5 confederations)

Final positions
- Champions: (Angola) 1º de Agosto (1st title)
- Runners-up: China National Club
- Third place: (Brazil) UnC Concórdia
- Fourth place: (Japan) Omron Yamaga

Tournament statistics
- Matches played: 12
- Goals scored: 621 (51.75 per match)
- Top scorers: Yukiko Yoshida (29 goals)

The 2019 IHF Women's Super Globe was the first edition of the tournament. It was held in Wuxi, China from 1 to 4 August 2019.

Angola's 1º de Agosto defeated host team China National Club in the final to win the inaugural event.

== Teams ==
Location of the teams

The winners of continental tournaments, two host teams and a wild card team participate.

Team	Qualified as
(Angola) 1º de Agosto	Winner of Africa Handball Super Cup
(Kazakhstan) Kaysar Club	Winner of Asian Club League Championship
(Australia) University of Queensland	Winner of Australian Handball Club Championship
(Brazil) UnC Concórdia	Winner of South and Central American Club Handball Championship
(Japan) Omron Yamaga	Replacement for the Winner of EHF Champions League
China National Club	Host
(China) Jiangsu Handball	Host
(United States) New York City THC	Wildcard (NorCa)

== Results ==
All times are local (UTC+8).

=== Bracket ===
Quarterfinals
1 August
(Japan) Omron Yamaga	29
(United States) New York City THC	22
1 August
(Kazakhstan) Kaysar Club	21
China National Club	24
1 August
(Angola) 1º de Agosto	41
(China) Jiangsu Handball	20
1 August
(Brazil) UnC Concórdia	31
(Australia) University of Queensland	16

Semifinals
2 August
(Japan) Omron Yamaga	25
China National Club	30
2 August
(Angola) 1º de Agosto	20
(Brazil) UnC Concórdia	17

Final
4 August
China National Club	22
(Angola) 1º de Agosto	27
Third place
4 August
(Japan) Omron Yamaga	32
(Brazil) UnC Concórdia	35

5th place bracket

5–8th place semifinals
2 August
(United States) New York City THC	16
(Kazakhstan) Kaysar Club	42
2 August
(China) Jiangsu Handball	33
(Australia) University of Queensland	17

Fifth place
4 August
(Kazakhstan) Kaysar Club	35
(China) Jiangsu Handball	30
Seventh place
4 August
(United States) New York City THC	17
(Australia) University of Queensland	19

=== Quarterfinals ===
1 August 2019; 14:00	Omron Yamaga (Japan)	29–22	(United States) New York City THC	Wuxi Sports Center, Wuxi; Referees: Cheng, Zhou (CHN)
1 August 2019; 14:00	Yoshida 8	(14–9)	Moser 7	Wuxi Sports Center, Wuxi; Referees: Cheng, Zhou (CHN)
1 August 2019; 14:00	1× (yellow card) 2× (suspension)	Report	1× (yellow card) 2× (suspension)	Wuxi Sports Center, Wuxi; Referees: Cheng, Zhou (CHN)

1 August 2019; 16:15	Kaysar Club (Kazakhstan)	21–24	China National Club	Wuxi Sports Center, Wuxi; Attendance: 250; Referees: García, Marín (ESP)
1 August 2019; 16:15	Alexandrova 7	(9–10)	Qiao 6	Wuxi Sports Center, Wuxi; Attendance: 250; Referees: García, Marín (ESP)
1 August 2019; 16:15	1× (yellow card) 2× (suspension)	Report	2× (yellow card) 3× (suspension)	Wuxi Sports Center, Wuxi; Attendance: 250; Referees: García, Marín (ESP)

1 August 2019; 18:30	1º de Agosto (Angola)	41–20	(China) Jiangsu Handball	Wuxi Sports Center, Wuxi; Referees: Alpaidze, Berezkina (RUS)
1 August 2019; 18:30	three players 5	(23–11)	Wang S. 6	Wuxi Sports Center, Wuxi; Referees: Alpaidze, Berezkina (RUS)
1 August 2019; 18:30	2× (yellow card) 1× (suspension)	Report	2× (yellow card) 7× (suspension)	Wuxi Sports Center, Wuxi; Referees: Alpaidze, Berezkina (RUS)

1 August 2019; 20:45	UnC Concórdia (Brazil)	31–16	(Australia) University of Queensland	Wuxi Sports Center, Wuxi; Referees: Lee, Lee (KOR)
1 August 2019; 20:45	Carneiro 6	(16–9)	Kirk 7	Wuxi Sports Center, Wuxi; Referees: Lee, Lee (KOR)
1 August 2019; 20:45	2× (yellow card) 5× (suspension)	Report	3× (suspension)	Wuxi Sports Center, Wuxi; Referees: Lee, Lee (KOR)

=== 5–8th place semifinals ===
2 August 2019; 14:00	New York City THC (United States)	16–42	(Kazakhstan) Kaysar Club	Wuxi Sports Center, Wuxi; Referees: Lee, Lee (KOR)
2 August 2019; 14:00	Keslerová 6	(8–18)	Abilda 6	Wuxi Sports Center, Wuxi; Referees: Lee, Lee (KOR)
2 August 2019; 14:00	6× (suspension) 1× (red card)	Report	2× (yellow card) 3× (suspension)	Wuxi Sports Center, Wuxi; Referees: Lee, Lee (KOR)

2 August 2019; 16:15	Jiangsu Handball (China)	33–17	(Australia) University of Queensland	Wuxi Sports Center, Wuxi; Referees: Alpaidze, Berezkina (RUS)
2 August 2019; 16:15	Wang D. 8	(14–7)	Skjæret 3	Wuxi Sports Center, Wuxi; Referees: Alpaidze, Berezkina (RUS)
2 August 2019; 16:15	2× (yellow card) 4× (suspension)	Report	1× (yellow card) 5× (suspension)	Wuxi Sports Center, Wuxi; Referees: Alpaidze, Berezkina (RUS)

=== Semifinals ===
2 August 2019; 18:30	Omron Yamaga (Japan)	25–30	China National Club	Wuxi Sports Center, Wuxi; Referees: El-Saied, El-Saied (EGY)
2 August 2019; 18:30	Yoshida 12	(14–12)	Zhao 5	Wuxi Sports Center, Wuxi; Referees: El-Saied, El-Saied (EGY)
2 August 2019; 18:30	1× (yellow card) 2× (suspension)	Report	1× (yellow card) 6× (suspension)	Wuxi Sports Center, Wuxi; Referees: El-Saied, El-Saied (EGY)

2 August 2019; 20:45	1º de Agosto (Angola)	20–17	(Brazil) UnC Concórdia	Wuxi Sports Center, Wuxi; Referees: García, Marín (ESP)
2 August 2019; 20:45	Mwasesa 6	(10–7)	Fiore 6	Wuxi Sports Center, Wuxi; Referees: García, Marín (ESP)
2 August 2019; 20:45	1× (yellow card) 5× (suspension)	Report	2× (yellow card) 2× (suspension)	Wuxi Sports Center, Wuxi; Referees: García, Marín (ESP)

=== Seventh place game ===
4 August 2019; 14:00	New York City THC (United States)	17–19	(Australia) University of Queensland	Wuxi Sports Center, Wuxi; Referees: Lee, Lee (KOR)
4 August 2019; 14:00	Michaelsen 4	(7–10)	Kirk, McAfee 4	Wuxi Sports Center, Wuxi; Referees: Lee, Lee (KOR)
4 August 2019; 14:00	2× (yellow card) 7× (suspension)	Report	2× (yellow card) 1× (suspension) 1× (red card)	Wuxi Sports Center, Wuxi; Referees: Lee, Lee (KOR)

=== Fifth place game ===
4 August 2019; 16:15	Kaysar Club (Kazakhstan)	35–30	(China) Jiangsu Handball	Wuxi Sports Center, Wuxi; Referees: El-Saied, El-Saied (EGY)
4 August 2019; 16:15	Pikalova 10	(18–15)	Wang D. 6	Wuxi Sports Center, Wuxi; Referees: El-Saied, El-Saied (EGY)
4 August 2019; 16:15	2× (suspension)	Report	1× (yellow card) 6× (suspension)	Wuxi Sports Center, Wuxi; Referees: El-Saied, El-Saied (EGY)

=== Third place game ===
4 August 2019; 18:30	Omron Yamaga (Japan)	32–35	(Brazil) UnC Concórdia	Wuxi Sports Center, Wuxi; Referees: Cheng, Zhou (CHN)
4 August 2019; 18:30	Yoshida 9	(17–17)	Alves 10	Wuxi Sports Center, Wuxi; Referees: Cheng, Zhou (CHN)
4 August 2019; 18:30	2× (yellow card) 1× (suspension)	Report	2× (yellow card) 3× (suspension)	Wuxi Sports Center, Wuxi; Referees: Cheng, Zhou (CHN)

=== Final ===
4 August 2019; 20:45	China National Club	22–27	(Angola) 1º de Agosto	Wuxi Sports Center, Wuxi; Referees: Alpaidze, Berezkina (RUS)
4 August 2019; 20:45	Jin 8	(10–13)	Paulo 10	Wuxi Sports Center, Wuxi; Referees: Alpaidze, Berezkina (RUS)
4 August 2019; 20:45	1× (yellow card) 2× (suspension)	Report	1× (yellow card) 7× (suspension)	Wuxi Sports Center, Wuxi; Referees: Alpaidze, Berezkina (RUS)

== Final ranking ==
Rank	Team
1st place, gold medalist(s)	(Angola) 1º de Agosto
2nd place, silver medalist(s)	China National Club
3rd place, bronze medalist(s)	(Brazil) UnC Concórdia
4	(Japan) Omron Yamaga
5	(Kazakhstan) Kaysar Club
6	(China) Jiangsu Handball
7	(Australia) University of Queensland
8	(United States) New York City THC

== Top goalscorers ==
Rank	Player	Club	Goals
1	(Japan) Yukiko Yoshida	(Japan) Omron Yamaga	29
2	(Brazil) Talita Caneiro	(Brazil) UnC Concórdia	19
2	(Kazakhstan) Dana Abilda	(Kazakhstan) Kaysar Club	19
4	(Angola) Helena Paulo	(Angola) D'Agosto	18
4	(Democratic Republic of the Congo) Christianne Mwasesa	(Angola) D'Agosto	18
