= Yukiko Yoshida =

Japanese handballer (born 1989)

Personal information
- Nationality: Japanese
- Born: 12 July 1989 (age 37)
- Height: 1.71 m (5 ft 7 in)

Sport
- Sport: Handball
- Position: Left back
- Current club: Omron Yamaga
- Number: 4

Yukiko Yoshida (born 12 July 1989) is a Japanese female handballer who plays as a left back for Omron Yamaga.

== Individual awards ==
- IHF Super Globe Top Scorer: 2019
