= Ikumi =

- Gender: Female
- Language: Japanese

Origin
- Region of origin: Japan

Ikumi (郁美, 郁久美, いくみ) is a feminine Japanese given name.

People with this name include:

- Mia Ikumi (征海 美亜; 1979–2022), Japanese manga artist
- Ikumi Hasegawa (長谷川 育美), Japanese voice actress
- Ikumi Hayama (葉山 郁美; born 1984), Japanese voice actress
- Ikumi Hisamatsu (久松 郁実; born 1996), Japanese fashion model, gravure idol and actress
- Ikumi Iwabuchi (岩渕 いくみ; born 1995), Japanese handball player
- Ikumi Kai (甲斐 生海; born 2000), Japanese professional baseball outfielder
- Ikumi Nakagami (中上 育実; born 1983), Japanese voice actress
- Ikumi Nakamura (中村 育美; born 1985), Japanese video game artist
- Ikumi Narita (成田 郁久美; born 1976), Japanese volleyball player
- Ikumi Nishibori (西堀 育実; born 1981), Japanese volleyball player
- Ikumi Oeda (born 1993), Thai judoka
- Ikumi Yamazaki (山崎 郁美; born 2001), Japanese tennis player
- Ikumi Yoshimatsu (吉松 育美; born 1987), first Japanese woman to win the Miss International pageant
