= Helena Paulo =

Angolan handball player

Personal information
- Full name: Helena Gilda Simão Paulo
- Nationality: Angolan
- Born: 24 January 1998 (age 28)
- Height: 1.76 m (5 ft 9 in)

Sport
- Sport: Handball
- Position: Centre back
- Current club: CSM Târgu Jiu
- Number: 4

Senior clubs
- Years: Team
- -2024: Primeiro de Agosto
- 2024-: CSM Târgu Jiu
National team
Years	Team	Apps	(Gls)
–	Angola	63	(208)
Medal record
African Championship
Gold medal – first place	2018 Brazzaville
Gold medal – first place	2021 Yaoundé
Gold medal – first place	2022 Dakar
Gold medal – first place	2024 Kinshasa
- Updated on 12 November 2025

Helena Gilda Simão Paulo (born 24 January 1998) is an Angolan handball player for Romanian CSM Târgu Jiu and the Angolan national team. She competed at the 2020 Summer Olympics, in Women's Handball.

== National team ==
She represented Angola at the 2017 World Women's Handball Championship in Germany, and at the 2021 World Women's Handball Championship in Spain.

In 2018, she represented Angola at the 2018 Women's Junior World Handball Championship where she finished as the competition's top scorer with a total 73 goals.

== Club career ==
At club level she played with Primeiro de Agosto until 2024. In 2019 she was part of the team that won the IHF Women's Super Globe. Paulo scored 10 goals in the final.

== Achievements ==
- Carpathian Trophy:
  - Winner: 2019
- Super Globe
  - Winner: 2019

== Individual awards ==
- 2019 Carpathian Trophy Top Scorer
- 2022 African Women's Handball Championship MVP
