= Mai Kragballe Nielsen =

Danish handball player (born 1997)

Mai Kragballe
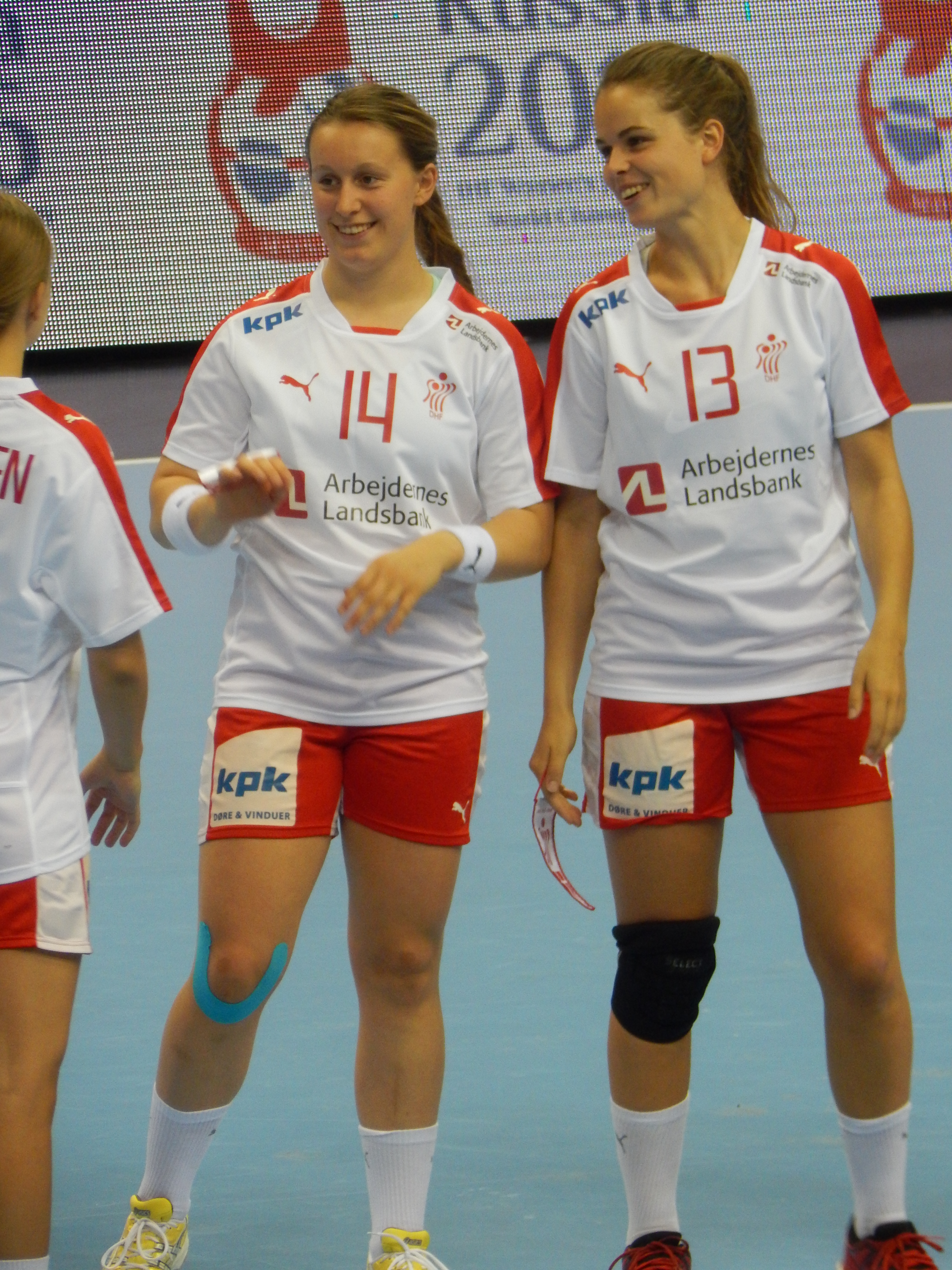
- Mai Kragballe in 2016

Personal information
- Full name: Mai Kragballe Nielsen
- Nationality: Danish
- Born: 15 December 1997 (age 28) Copenhagen, Denmark
- Height: 1.72 m (5 ft 8 in)

Sport
- Sport: Handball
- Position: Centre Back
- Current club: IK Sävehof
- Number: 17

Senior clubs
- Years: Team
- 2014–2015: FC Midtjylland
- 2015–2019: København Håndbold
- 2019–2022: Randers HK
- 2022: Neptunes de Nantes
- 2022–: IK Sävehof
National team
- Years: Team
- –: Denmark
Medal record
IHF Junior World Championship
Gold medal – first place	2016 Russia
IHF Youth World Championship
Bronze medal – third place	2014 Macedonia
European Junior Championship
Gold medal – first place	2015 Spain
European Youth Olympic Festival
Gold medal – first place	2013 Utrecht

Mai Kragballe Nielsen (born 15 December 1997) is a Danish handball player who currently plays for IK Sävehof.

She has previously played for FCM Håndbold, København Håndbold, Randers HK, and Neptunes de Nantes. Her senior debut came in 2015 for FCM Håndbold. In the 2024-25 season she scored the second most goals in the Danish league with 243, only behind København Håndbold's Tabea Schmid.

She has represented Denmark on several youth levels.
