= Yaroslava Frolova =

Russian handball player (born 1997)

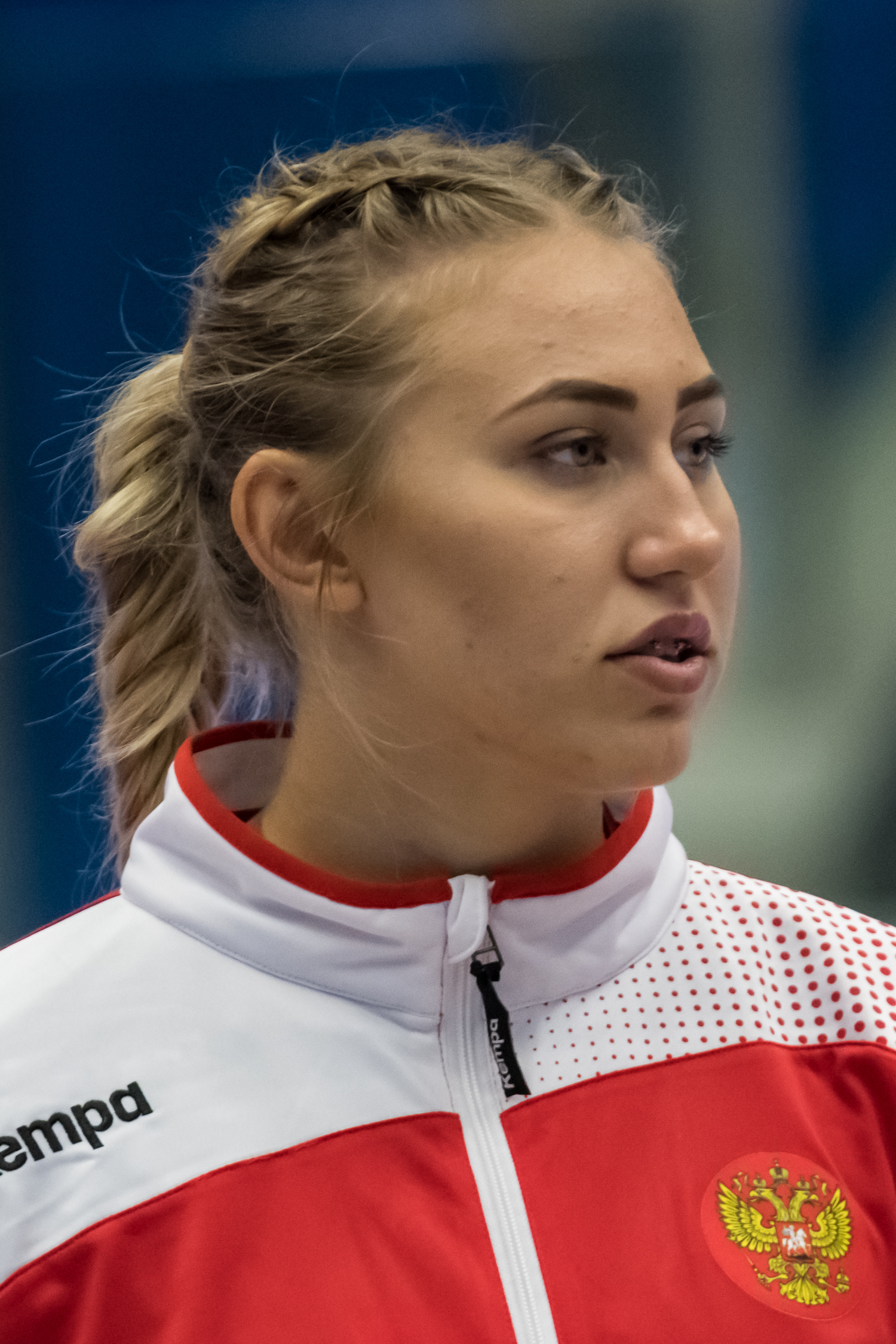

Personal information
- Nationality: Russian
- Born: 18 May 1997 (age 29) Volgograd, Russia
- Height: 1.77 m (5 ft 10 in)

Sport
- Sport: Handball
- Position: Centre back
- Current club: Rostov-Don
- Number: 25

Senior clubs
- Years: Team
- 2013–2017: Dinamo Volgograd
- 2017–2020: HC Kuban Krasnodar
- 2020–: Rostov-Don
National team
Years	Team	Apps	(Gls)
2017–	Russia	38	(80)
Medal record
World Championship
Bronze medal – third place	2019 Japan
European Championship
Silver medal – second place	2018 France
Junior World Championship
Silver medal – second place	2016 Russia
European Junior Championship
Silver medal – second place	2015 Spain
European Youth Championship
Silver medal – second place	2013 Poland
Youth Olympic Games
Silver medal – second place	2014 Nanjing
European Youth Olympic Festival
Silver medal – second place	2013 Utrecht

Yaroslava Vladimirovna Frolova (Russian: Ярослава Владимировна Фролова; born 18 May 1997) is a Russian handballer for Rostov-Don and the Russian national team.

== Achievements ==
- Russian Super League:
  - Winner: 2014
- IHF Junior World Championship:
  - Silver Medalist: 2016

== Individual awards ==
- Most valuable player of the IHF Junior World Championship: 2016
- All-Star Centre Back of the EHF Junior European Championship: 2015
