= Annika Jakobsen =

Danish handball player (born 1997)

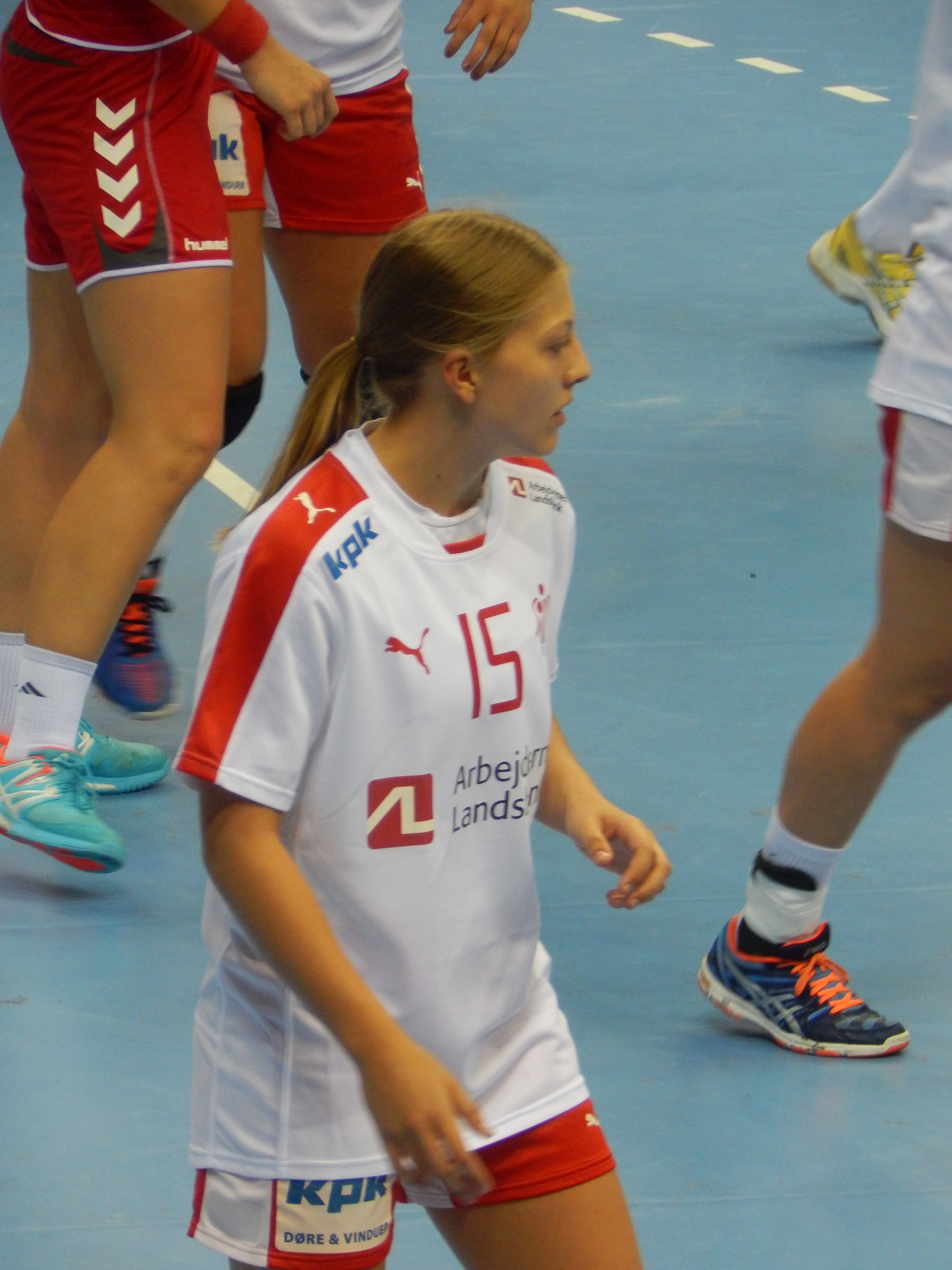

Personal information
- Full name: Annika Jakobsen
- Nationality: Danish
- Born: 25 February 1997 (age 29) Horsens, Denmark
- Height: 1.69 m (5 ft 7 in)

Sport
- Sport: Handball
- Position: Right wing
- Current club: Silkeborg-Voel KFUM
- Number: 19

Senior clubs
- Years: Team
- 2014–2016: FC Midtjylland Håndbold
- 2016–2017: Skanderborg Håndbold
- 2017–2020: Herning-Ikast Håndbold
- 2020–: Silkeborg-Voel KFUM
Medal record
IHF Junior World Championship
Gold medal – first place	2016 Russia
European Junior Championship
Gold medal – first place	2015 Spain
European Youth Championship
Bronze medal – third place	2013 Poland

Annika Jakobsen (born 25 February 1997) is a Danish handballer who plays for Silkeborg-Voel KFUM.
