= Song Ji-eun (handballer) =

South Korean handball player (born 1996)

Personal information
- Nationality: South Korean
- Born: 4 September 1996 (age 30)
- Height: 1.70 m (5 ft 7 in)

Sport
- Sport: Handball
- Position: Centre back
- Current club: SK Sugar Gliders

Senior clubs
- Years: Team
- –: Incheon City
- –: SK Sugar Gliders
National team
- Years: Team
- –: South Korea
Medal record
Asian Games
Gold medal – first place	2018 Jakarta	Team

Song Ji-eun (born 4 September 1996) is a South Korean female handballer who plays for SK Sugar Gliders and the South Korea national team.

She participated at the 2017 World Women's Handball Championship.

== Individual awards ==
- Top Goalscorer of the IHF Junior World Championship: 2016
