= Liga Nacional de Handebol Feminino 2019 =

2019 Liga Handebol Brasil feminina
Tournament details
- Host country: Brazil

Final positions
- Champions: (São Paulo (state)) EC Pinheiros (2nd title)
- Runners-up: (São Paulo (state)) UNIP São Bernardo
- Third place: (Santa Catarina (state)) UnC Concórdia
- Fourth place: (Santa Catarina (state)) Blumenau FURB

The Liga Handebol Brasil feminina 2019 (2019 Women's Brazil Handball League) was the 23rd season of the top tier Brazilian handball national competitions for clubs, it is organized by the Brazilian Handball Confederation. For the 2nd time EC Pinheiros was crowned champion winning the final against UNIP São Bernardo.

== Teams qualified for the play-offs ==
South Southeast Conference

- (São Paulo (state)) EC Pinheiros
- (São Paulo (state)) UNIP São Bernardo
- (Santa Catarina (state)) UnC Concórdia
- (Santa Catarina (state)) Blumenau FURB

Northeastern Conference

- (Pernambuco) Clube Português

Central west Conference

- (Goiás) Força Atlética

== Play-offs ==
=== Group A ===
Pos	Team	Pld	W	D	L	GF	GA	GD	Pts
1	(São Paulo (state)) EC Pinheiros	2	2	0	0	79	39	40	4
2	(Santa Catarina (state)) Blumenau FURB	2	1	0	1	64	59	5	2
3	(Goiás) Força Atlética	2	0	0	2	36	81	–45	0

=== Group B ===
Pos	Team	Pld	W	D	L	GF	GA	GD	Pts
1	(São Paulo (state)) UNIP São Bernardo	2	1	0	1	49	42	7	2
2	(Santa Catarina (state)) UnC Concórdia	2	1	0	1	46	45	1	2
3	(Pernambuco) Clube Português	2	1	0	1	43	51	–8	2

Team qualified to the final match
Team qualified to the bronze medal match

=== 5th place match ===
December 22 2019; 12:00	Força Atlética (Goiás)	13–28	(Pernambuco) Clube Português	Ginásio Henrique Villaboim, São Paulo
December 22 2019; 12:00		(8–14)		Ginásio Henrique Villaboim, São Paulo

=== Bronze medal match ===
December 22 2019; 14:00	Blumenau FURB (Santa Catarina (state))	14–21	(Santa Catarina (state)) UnC Concórdia	Ginásio Henrique Villaboim, São Paulo
December 22 2019; 14:00		(5–9)		Ginásio Henrique Villaboim, São Paulo

=== Final ===
December 22 2019; 16:00	EC Pinheiros (São Paulo (state))	21–18	(São Paulo (state)) UNIP São Bernardo	Ginásio Henrique Villaboim, São Paulo
December 22 2019; 16:00		(11–5)		Ginásio Henrique Villaboim, São Paulo
