= Cristina Laslo =

Romanian handball player (born 1996)

Personal information
- Born: 10 April 1996 (age 30) Cluj-Napoca, Romania
- Height: 1.77 m (5 ft 10 in)

Sport
- Sport: Handball
- Position: Centre back
- Current club: Gloria Bistrița
- Number: 13

Youth career
- Years: Team
- 2008–2011: CSȘ Viitorul Cluj-Napoca

Senior clubs
- Years: Team
- 2011–2017: CS Universitatea Cluj-Napoca
- 2017–2019: ŽRK Budućnost
- 2019–2020: Corona Brașov
- 2020–2022: Minaur Baia Mare
- 2022-: Gloria Bistrița
National team
Years	Team	Apps	(Gls)
2016–	Romania	80	(139)
Medal record
Junior World Championship
Bronze medal – third place	2016 Russia
Youth World Championship
Gold medal – first place	2014 Macedonia

Cristina Laslo (born 10 April 1996) is a Romanian professional handballer who plays as a centre back for Gloria Bistrița and the Romanian national team.

== International honours ==
- IHF Youth World Championship:
  - Gold Medalist: 2014
- IHF Junior World Championship:
  - Bronze Medalist: 2016

== Awards and recognition ==
- All-Star Central Back of the IHF Youth World Championship: 2014
- All-Star Central Back of the IHF Junior World Championship: 2016
- Liga Națională Best Romanian Player: 2021
