= Maria Lykkegaard =

Danish handball player (born 1996)

Personal information
- Full name: Maria Schmidt Lykkegaard
- Nationality: Danish
- Born: 27 February 1996 (age 30) Copenhagen, Denmark
- Height: 1.76 m (5 ft 9 in)

Sport
- Sport: Handball
- Position: Line player
- Current club: SCM Râmnicu Vâlcea
- Number: 18

Youth career
- Years: Team
- 2011-2012: BK Ydun
- 2012-2015: Frederiksberg IF

Senior clubs
- Years: Team
- 2013-2023: København Håndbold
- 2023-2025: Ikast Håndbold
- 2025-: SCM Râmnicu Vâlcea
National team
Years	Team	Apps	(Gls)
2018–	Denmark	4	(4)
Medal record
Junior World Championship
Gold medal – first place	2016 Russia
Junior European Championship
Gold medal – first place	2015 Spain
Youth World Championship
Bronze medal – third place	2014 Macedonia
Youth European Championship
Bronze medal – third place	2013 Poland
- Updated on 27 August 2026

Maria Schmidt Lykkegaard (born 27 February 1996) is a Danish handball player who plays for SCM Râmnicu Vâlcea and the Danish national team.

She also represented Denmark in the 2016 Women's Junior World Handball Championship and in the 2015 Women's U-19 European Handball Championship, receiving gold both times.

She made her debut on the Danish national team on 28 September 2018.

== Achievements ==
- Danish Championship:
  - Winner: 2018
  - Silver Medalist: 2017
