= Kumamoto Beaust Pindys =

Japanese handball club

Kumamoto Beaust PINDYS
- Short name: Beaust, Pindys
- Founded: 1974; 52 years ago
- Arena: Yamaga City General Gymnasium
- President: Yoshihito Yamada
- Head coach: Hong Jeong-Ho
- League: Japan Handball League
- 2025-26: 5th
- Club colours

Kumamoto Beaust Pindys is a Japanese women's handball club from Yamaga, Kumamoto that plays in the Japan Handball League. The club was founded in 1974. With 17 Japanese Championships, they hold the most titles of any team.

The club was previously known as Omron Corporation Handball Team, due to being sponsored by the electronics company Omron. In 2024 they changed their name as part of a transition from a corporate owned club to a community owned one.

In 2019 they played at the inaugural IHF Super Globe, where they finished 4th.

== Titles ==
- Japan Handball League
  - Winner: (17) 1977, 1981, 1982, 1983, 1984, 1987, 1993, 1994, 1996, 1998, 2006, 2007, 2008, 2009, 2012, 2013, 2014
- IHF Super Globe
  - Fouth place: 2019

== Notable former players ==
- (Japan) Rino Aizawa
- (Japan) Yuko Arihama
- (Japan) Shio Fujii
- (Japan) Kaori Fujima
- (Japan) Clare Francis Gray
- (South Korea) Hong Jeong Ho
- (South Korea) Kim Cha-youn
- (Japan) Yui Inaba
- (Japan) Mayuko Ishitate
- (Japan) Ikumi Iwabuchi
- (South Korea) Jung Ji-in
- (Japan) Chie Katsuren
- (South Korea) Lee Mi-gyeong
- (Japan) Yumi Miyakawa
- (Japan) Shiori Nagata
- (Japan) Sato Shiroishi
- (Japan) Maaya Watanabe
- (Japan) Yukiko Yoshida
- (Denmark) Siw Aabech
