= Yumi Miyakawa =

Japanese handball player (born 1991)

Personal information
- Nationality: Japanese
- Born: 2 November 1991 (age 34) Aomori Prefecture, Japan
- Height: 1.72 m (5 ft 8 in)

Sport
- Sport: Handball
- Position: Goalkeeper

Youth career
- Years: Team
- –: Aomori Central High School

Senior clubs
- Years: Team
- 2010-2023: Omron
National team
Years	Team	Apps	(Gls)
–	Japan	10	(0)
Medal record
Asian Championship
Silver medal – second place	2021 Jordan

Yumi Miyakawa (born 2 November 1991) is a Japanese former handball player for the Japanese national team.

She represented Japan at the 2019 World Women's Handball Championship.

At club level she played for Omron. She retired in 2023.
