= Ida Vium =

Danish handball player (born 1996)

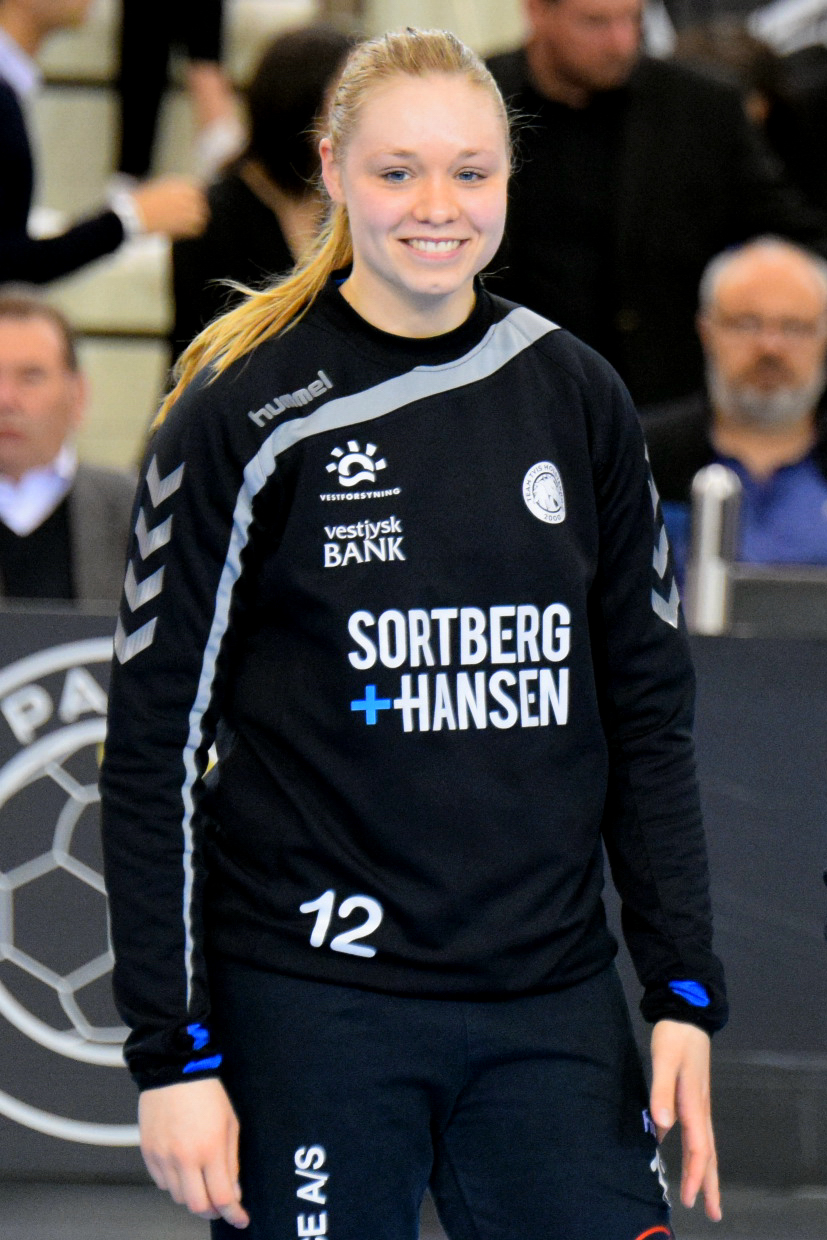

Personal information
- Full name: Ida Kramer Vium
- Nationality: Danish
- Born: 2 February 1996 (age 30) Lemvig, Denmark
- Height: 1.87 m (6 ft 2 in)

Sport
- Sport: Handball
- Position: Goalkeeper

Youth career
- Years: Team
- 2012-2014: TTH Holstebro

Senior clubs
- Years: Team
- 2014-2018: TTH Holstebro
- 2018-2019: Ringkøbing Håndbold
- 2019-2020: Skövde HF
- 2023-: Ringkøbing Håndbold
Medal record
IHF Junior World Championship
Gold medal – first place	2016 Russia
IHF Youth World Championship
Bronze medal – third place	2014 Macedonia
European Junior Championship
Gold medal – first place	2015 Spain
European Youth Championship
Bronze medal – third place	2013 Poland

Ida Kramer Vium (born 2 February 1996) is a Danish handball player who plays for Ringkøbing Håndbold. She had initially retired in 2020 at the age of only 24. At that time she was playing for Skövde HF in Sweden. But she was convinced by the Danish club Ringkøbing Håndbold to return to the handball field in 2023.

In addition to handball, Vium works as a physiotherapist.
