= Alina Ilie =

Romanian handball player (born 1996)

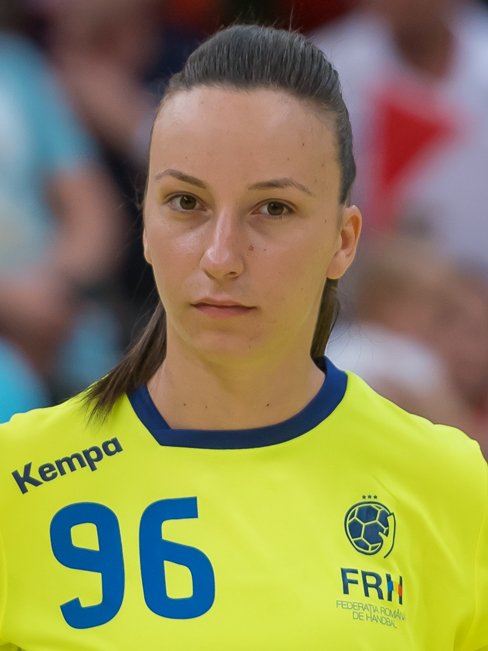

Personal information
- Nationality: Romanian
- Born: 13 May 1996 (age 30) Bălcești, Romania
- Height: 1.79 m (5 ft 10 in)

Sport
- Sport: Handball
- Position: Right back
- Current club: Rapid București
- Number: 96

Youth career
- Years: Team
- –2014: CNE Râmnicu Vâlcea

Senior clubs
- Years: Team
- 2014–2015: → Unirea Slobozia (loan)
- 2015–2018: Unirea Slobozia
- 2018–2023: SCM Gloria Buzău
- 2023–: Rapid București
National team
- Years: Team
- 2016–: Romania
- Updated on 1 November 2017

Alina Ilie (born 13 May 1996) is a Romanian handballer who plays for Rapid București.

== Achievements ==
- IHF Youth World Championship:
  - Gold Medalist: 2014
- IHF Junior World Championship:
  - Bronze Medalist: 2016
