= Chaïma Jouini =

Tunisian handball player

Chaima Jouini
Personal information
- Nationality: Tunisian
- Born: 2 July 1996 (age 30)
- Height: 1.73 m (5 ft 8 in)

Sport
- Sport: Handball
- Position: Left back
- Current club: Club Africain
National team
Years	Team	Apps	(Gls)
–	Tunisia	17	(60)

Chaima Jouini (born 2 July 1996) is a Tunisian handball player for Club Africain and the Tunisian national team.

She participated at the 2015 World Women's Handball Championship.
