= Ikumi Iwabuchi =

Japanese handball player (born 1995)

Personal information
- Nationality: Japanese
- Born: 14 December 1995 (age 30)
- Height: 1.70 m (5 ft 7 in)

Sport
- Sport: Handball
- Position: Right back
- Current club: Omron Corporation
National team
Years	Team	Apps	(Gls)
–	Japan	8	(20)
Medal record
Asian Championship
Silver medal – second place	2021 Jordan

Ikumi Iwabuchi (born 14 December 1995) is a Japanese handball player for Omron Corporation and the Japanese national team.

She represented Japan at the 2021 World Women's Handball Championship in Spain.
