= Krylatskoye Sports Palace =

Indoor sporting arena in Moscow, Russia

Dynamo Palace of Sports in Krylatskoye
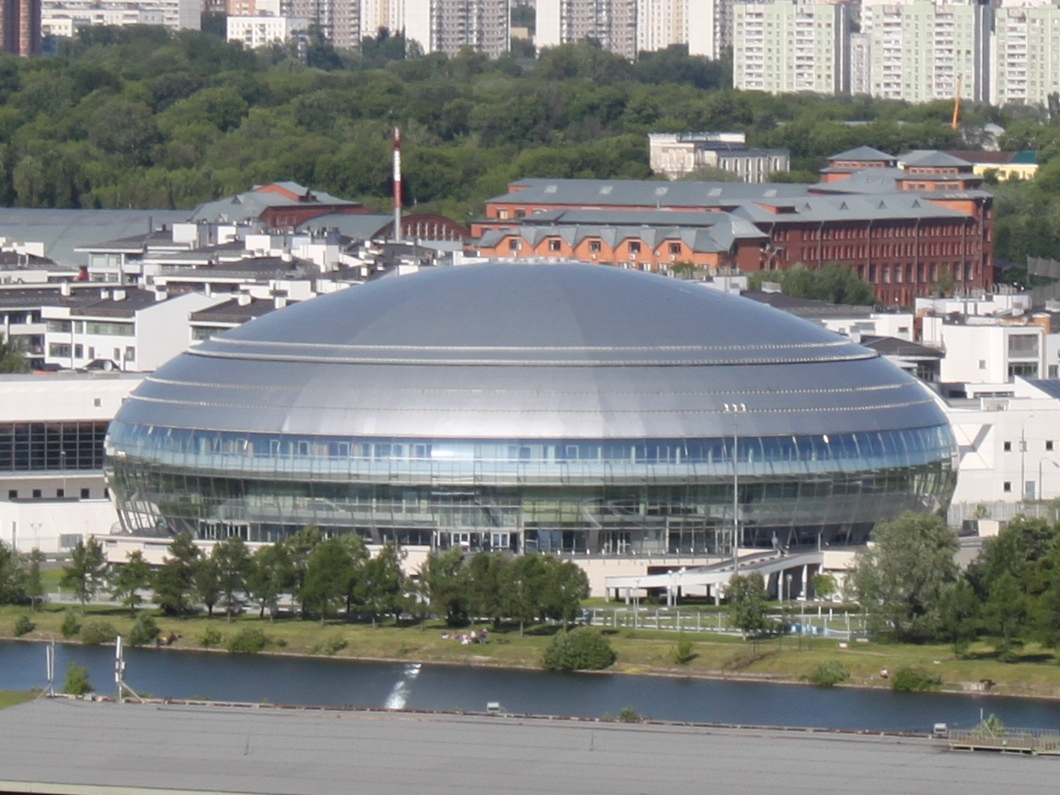
- The exterior of Dynamo Palace of Sports in Krylatskoye.
- Interactive map of Dynamo Palace of Sports in Krylatskoye
- Location: Krylatskoye District, Moscow, Russia
- Coordinates: 55°45′26.21″N 37°26′36.20″E
- Capacity: 5,000
- Surface: Parquet
- Public transit: Molodyozhnaya; Krylatskoye

Construction
- Opened: August 30, 2006

Tenants
- MFC Dynamo Moscow; BC Dynamo Moscow (2006–2016); WBC Dynamo Moscow; Khimki Moscow Region

Dynamo Palace of Sports in Krylatskoye (Russian: Дворец спорта «Динамо» в Крылатском) is a multi-purpose indoor sporting arena in Krylatskoye District, Moscow, Russia. The arena has mainly been used to host futsal, boxing, and basketball. The seating capacity of the arena is for 5,000 people.

== History ==
Dynamo Palace of Sports in Krylatskoye was opened in 2006. It has been used as the home arena of the Dynamo Moscow men's basketball team, and the Dynamo Moscow women's basketball. It has also been used as the home arena of Dynamo Moscow's men's futsal team.

The arena hosted the Final Four of the UEFA Futsal Cup 2007–08 season. Khimki Moscow Region also used the arena to host EuroLeague games for the EuroLeague 2015–16 season, and Krasny Oktyabr also used the arena for home games in the EuroCup competition.
