= UnC Concórdia =

AAU UnC Concórdia
- Full name: Associação Atlética Universitária Concórdia
- Founded: March 23, 2005; 21 years ago
- Arena: Ginásio da Universidade do Contestado
- Head coach: Alexandre Schneider
- League: Liga Nacional de Handebol
- 2019: 3rd
- Club colours
Home	Away

AAU UnC Concórdia is a women's handball club from Concórdia, Brazil. Currently, they compete in the Brazilian National League.

== Accomplishments ==
- Brazilian National League:
  - 2013, 2017, 2018
- South and Central American Women's Club Handball Championship:
  - 2019
- Super Globe:
  - 2019:

== Team ==
=== Current squad ===
Squad for the 2019 IHF Super Globe.

Goalkeepers

- 1 (Brazil) Luciane Verona
- 20 (Brazil) Maite Lima Dias

Wings
RW

- 7 (Brazil) Aline Bieger
- 14 (Brazil) Agda Pereira
- 15 (Brazil) Ana Luiza Aguiar

LW

- 10 (Brazil) Barbarah Monteiro
- 88 (Brazil) Jamily Felix

Line players

- 2 (Brazil) Nadyne Morcineck
- 6 (Paraguay) Sabrina Fiore

Back players
LB

- 3 (Brazil) Eduarda Engel
- 13 (Brazil) Talita Alves Carneiro
- 19 (Brazil) Amanda Caetano
- 22 (Brazil) Francieli Sothe

CB

- 99 (Brazil) Tauani Schneider

RB

- 4 (Brazil) Daise Oliveira
- 73 (Brazil) Juliane Pereira
