= Mu Qingcong =

Chinese handball player (born 1997)

Personal information
- Nationality: Chinese
- Born: 26 May 1997 (age 29)
- Height: 1.80 m (5 ft 11 in)

Sport
- Sport: Handball
- Position: Pivot
- Current club: Shandong Handball
National team
Years	Team	Apps	(Gls)
2019–	China	7	(5)

Mu Qingcong (born 26 May 1997) is a Chinese handball player for Shandong Handball and the Chinese national team.

She represented China at the 2019 World Women's Handball Championship in Japan, where the Chinese team placed 23rd.
