= María Prieto O'Mullony =

Spanish handball player (born 1997)

María Prieto
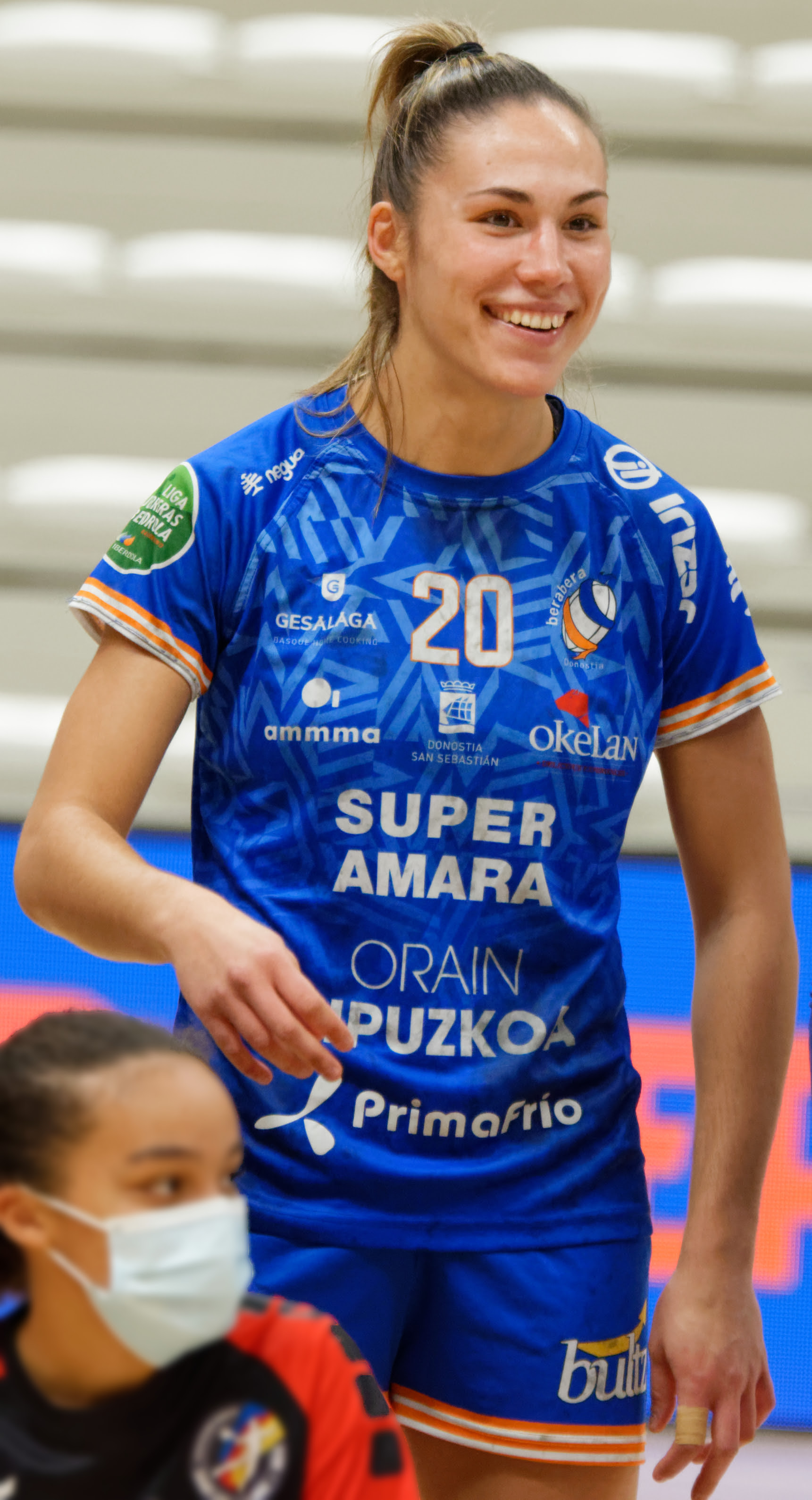
- Maria Prieto O'Mullony (2021)

Personal information
- Full name: María Prieto O'Mullony
- Nationality: Spanish
- Born: 3 October 1997 (age 29) Zamora, Spain
- Height: 1.73 m (5 ft 8 in)

Sport
- Sport: Handball
- Position: Right Back
- Current club: Caja Rural Aula Valladolid
- Number: 20

Senior clubs
- Years: Team
- 2013–2015: Cleba León
- 2015–2019: BM Aula Cultural
- 2019-2022: BM Bera Bera
- 2022-: Caja Rural Aula Valladolid
National team
Years	Team	Apps	(Gls)
2018–	Spain	40	(76)
Medal record
Mediterranean Games
Gold medal – first place	2018 Tarragona	Team
- Updated on 5 December 2024

María Prieto O'Mullony (born 3 October 1997) is a Spanish female handballer for Caja Rural Aula Valladolid and the Spanish national team.

She won the gold medal at the 2018 Mediterranean Games.

== Awards and recognition ==
- Trofeo Vicen Muñoz:
  - Winner: 2017/18
