= Liga Nacional de Handebol Feminino 2018 =

2018 Liga Nacional de Handebol Feminino
Tournament details
- Host country: Brazil

Final positions
- Champions: (Santa Catarina (state)) UnC Concórdia (3rd title)
- Runners-up: (São Paulo (state)) UNIP São Bernardo
- Third place: (São Paulo (state)) EC Pinheiros
- Fourth place: (Pernambuco) Português AESO

The Liga Nacional de Handebol Feminino 2018 (2018 Women's National Handball League) was the 22nd season of the top tier Brazilian handball national competitions for clubs, it is organized by the Brazilian Handball Confederation. For the 3rd time UnC Concórdia was crowned champion winning the final against UNIP São Bernardo.

== Teams qualified for the play-offs ==
South Southeast Conference

- (Santa Catarina (state)) UnC Concórdia
- (São Paulo (state)) EC Pinheiros
- (São Paulo (state)) UNIP São Bernardo
- (Santa Catarina (state)) Abluhand Blumenau

Northeastern Conference

- (Pernambuco) Português AESO
- (Pernambuco) Sport Recife

Northern Conference

- (Rondônia) Rádio Farol

Central west Conference

- (Goiás) Força Atlética

== Play-offs ==
Quarter-finals
(Santa Catarina (state))	UnC Concórdia	32	32	64
(Pernambuco)	Sport Recife	17	20	37
(Santa Catarina (state))	Abluhand Blumenau	26	17	43
(Pernambuco)	Português AESO	23	22	45
(São Paulo (state))	UNIP São Bernardo
(Rondônia)	~~Rádio Farol~~ withdrawn
(São Paulo (state))	EC Pinheiros	36	42	78
(Goiás)	Força Atlética	16	22	38

Semi-finals
(Santa Catarina (state))	UnC Concórdia	22	23	45
(Pernambuco)	Português AESO	18	18	36
(São Paulo (state))	UNIP São Bernardo	21	25	46
(São Paulo (state))	EC Pinheiros	19	20	39

Final
(Santa Catarina (state))	UnC Concórdia	25
(São Paulo (state))	UNIP São Bernardo	24
Third place
(Pernambuco)	Português AESO	17
(São Paulo (state))	EC Pinheiros	23

=== Final ===
December 16 2018; 13:00	UnC Concórdia (Santa Catarina (state))	25–24	(São Paulo (state)) UNIP São Bernardo	Ginásio Adib Moyses Dib, São Bernardo do Campo
December 16 2018; 13:00		(14–11)		Ginásio Adib Moyses Dib, São Bernardo do Campo
