= Talita Carneiro =

Brazilian handball player (born 1996)

Personal information
- Full name: Talita Alves Carneiro
- Born: 17 October 1996 (age 30) Ponte Nova, Minas Gerais, Brazil
- Height: 1.76 m (5 ft 9 in)

Sport
- Sport: Handball
- Position: Left back
- Current club: CBF Málaga Costa del Sol
National team
Years	Team	Apps	(Gls)
2021-	Brazil	5	(9)

Talita Alves Carneiro (born 17 October 1996) is a Brazilian handball player for CBF Málaga Costa del Sol and the Brazilian national team. She has previously played for UnC Concórdia in Brazil.

She represented Brazil at the 2021 World Women's Handball Championship in Spain.
