= IHF Women's Super Globe =

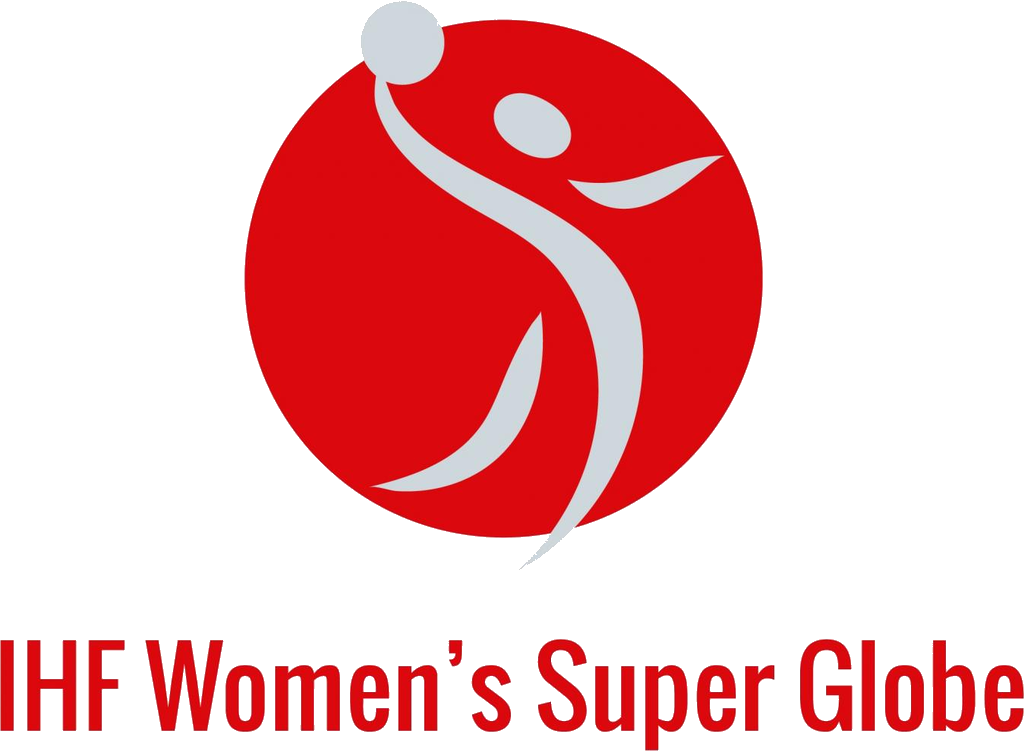
- Sport: Handball
- Founded: 2019; 7 years ago
- No. of teams: 8
- Confederation: IHF members
- Most recent champion: (Angola) 1º de Agosto (1st title)
- Most titles: (Angola) 1º de Agosto (1 title)

The Super Globe is a handball competition contested between the champion clubs from continental confederations.

The first Women's Super Globe was played in Wuxi, China.

== Summary ==
Year	Host	Final			Third place match		
Year	Host	Champion	Score	Second place	Third place	Score	Fourth place
2016	(Brazil)	Cancelled			Cancelled		
2019; Details	(China); Wuxi	(Angola); 1º de Agosto	27–22	China National Club	(Brazil); UnC Concórdia	35–32	(Japan); Omron Yamaga

== Records and statistics ==
=== By club ===
Rank	Club	Won	Runner-up	Third	Years won
1	(Angola) 1º de Agosto	1	0	0	2019
2	China National Club	0	1	0	
3	(Brazil) UnC Concórdia	0	0	1	

=== By country ===
Rank	Nation	Won	Runner-up	Third	Total
1	Angola	1	0	0	1
2	China	0	1	0	1
3	Brazil	0	0	1	1

== Participation details ==
Team	2019 (8)	Total
(Angola) 1º de Agosto	1st	1
(Australia) University of Queensland	7th	1
(Brazil) UnC Concórdia	3rd	1
China National Club	2nd	1
(China) Jiangsu Handball	6th	1
(Japan) Omron Yamaga	4th	1
(Kazakhstan) Kaysar Club	5th	1
(United States) New York City THC	8th	1
