= Saadi =

Saadi, Saʻdī, Sadi, or SADI may refer to:

== People ==
- Sadi (name)
- Saadi Shirazi, a Persian poet
- Saadi dynasty, a dynasty of Morocco

== Places ==
- Sədi, village in Azerbaijan
- Sadi, East Azerbaijan, a village in Iran
- Sadi, Marand, a village in Iran
- Sadi, Kerman, a village in Iran
- Sadi, Khuzestan, a village in Iran
- Sadi, Nepal

== Science, Medicine, and Technology ==
- SADI, Semantic Automated Discovery and Integration
- SADI-S, a type of bariatric surgery

== See also ==
- Sadi Moma, Bulgarian folk song
- Biswin Sadi, Urdu language literary magazine in India
- Saadia
- Sadiyan (disambiguation)
- Saad (disambiguation)
- Saudi (disambiguation)
