= 2016 African Women's Handball Championship =

2016 African Women's Championship

Tournament details
- Host country: Angola
- Venue: 1 (in 1 host city)
- Dates: 28 November – 7 December
- Teams: 9 (from 1 confederation)

Final positions
- Champions: Angola (12th title)
- Runners-up: Tunisia
- Third place: Cameroon
- Fourth place: Congo

Tournament statistics
- Matches played: 27
- Goals scored: 1,366 (50.59 per match)
- Top scorers: (Tunisia) Amal Hamrouni, 40

Awards
- Best player: (Angola) Natália Bernardo

The 2016 African Women's Handball Championship was the 22nd edition of the African Women's Handball Championship, held in Luanda, Angola from 28 November to 7 December 2016. It acted as the African qualifying tournament for the 2017 World Women's Handball Championship.

This was the first time in the history of the African championships that the male and female editions were organized in two different countries at different times. While men and women competitions were traditionally gathered in the same installations every two years in January, The African Handball Confederation (CAHB) had decided to separate the two competitions after several votes at a meeting on 23 January 2015 at the Abbasside Palace hotel in Algiers.

== Venue ==
Luanda	2016 African Women's Handball Championship is located in Angola
Pavilhão Multiusos do Kilamba; Capacity: 12,730	2016 African Women's Handball Championship is located in Angola

== Qualification ==
Country	Previous appearances in tournament^{1}
Algeria	15(1976, 1979, 1981,1983, 1989, 1991, 1992, 1994, 1996, 2000, 2002, 2008, 2010, 2012, 2014)
Angola	18 (1981, 1983, 1985, 1987, **1989**, 1991, **1992**, **1994**, 1996, **1998**, **2000**, **2002**, **2004**, **2006**, **2008**, **2010**, **2012**, 2014)
Cameroon	14 (1979, 1983, 1985, 1987, 1996, 1998, 2000, 2002, 2004, 2006, 2008, 2010, 2012, 2014)
Congo	20 (1976, **1979**, **1981**, **1983**, **1985**, 1987, 1989, 1991, 1992, 1994, 1996, 1998, 2002, 2002, 2004, 2006, 2008, 2010, 2012, 2014)
DR Congo	8 (1992, 2002, 2004, 2006, 2008, 2010, 2012, 2014)
Guinea	1 (2014)
Ivory Coast	19 (1976, 1979, 1981, 1983, 1985, **1987**, 1989, 1991, 1992, 1994, **1996**, 1998, 2000, 2002, 2004, 2006, 2008, 2010, 2012)
Senegal	7 (1974, 1976, 1991, 1992, 2000, 2012, 2014)
Tunisia	17 (**1974**, **1976**, 1981, 1983, 1985, 1987, 1989, 1992, 1994, 2000, 2002, 2004, 2006, 2008, 2010, 2012, **2014**)

^{1} Bold indicates champion for that year. Italics indicates host.

== Draw ==
Group A	Group B
Angola; Cameroon; DR Congo; Ivory Coast; Senegal	Algeria; Congo; Guinea; Tunisia

== Preliminary round ==
Times are local (UTC+1).

=== Group A ===
Pos	Team	Pld	W	D	L	GF	GA	GD	Pts	Qualification
1	Angola (H)	4	4	0	0	136	69	+67	8	Quarterfinals
2	Senegal	4	3	0	1	94	85	+9	6	Quarterfinals
3	Cameroon	4	2	0	2	77	95	−18	4	Quarterfinals
4	Ivory Coast	4	1	0	3	85	110	−25	2	Quarterfinals
5	DR Congo	4	0	0	4	92	125	−33	0	

Source: CAHB
Rules for classification: 1) points; 2) head-to-head points; 3) head-to-head goal difference; 4) head-to-head number of goals scored; 5) goal difference.
(H) Hosts

28 November 2016; 13:00	DR Congo	22–28	Senegal	Arena do Kilamba, Luanda; Referees: Gasmi, Gasmi (FRA)
28 November 2016; 13:00	Mwasesa 9	(10–15)	Diop 8	Arena do Kilamba, Luanda; Referees: Gasmi, Gasmi (FRA)
28 November 2016; 13:00	4× (yellow card) 6× (suspension) 1× (red card)		2× (yellow card) 2× (suspension)	Arena do Kilamba, Luanda; Referees: Gasmi, Gasmi (FRA)

28 November 2016; 19:00	Angola	37–18	Ivory Coast	Arena do Kilamba, Luanda; Referees: El-Saied, El-Saied (EGY)
28 November 2016; 19:00	three players 5	(21–7)	Fofana 5	Arena do Kilamba, Luanda; Referees: El-Saied, El-Saied (EGY)
28 November 2016; 19:00	3× (yellow card) 1× (suspension) 1× (red card)		2× (yellow card) 4× (suspension)	Arena do Kilamba, Luanda; Referees: El-Saied, El-Saied (EGY)

29 November 2016; 17:00	Ivory Coast	17–22	Cameroon	Arena do Kilamba, Luanda; Referees: Tshilanda, Amba (COD)
29 November 2016; 17:00	Fofana 4	(6–11)	Nchouapougnigni, Touba 5	Arena do Kilamba, Luanda; Referees: Tshilanda, Amba (COD)
29 November 2016; 17:00	1× (yellow card) 2× (suspension) 1× (red card)		2× (yellow card) 6× (suspension) 1× (red card)	Arena do Kilamba, Luanda; Referees: Tshilanda, Amba (COD)

29 November 2016; 19:00	Senegal	18–31	Angola	Arena do Kilamba, Luanda; Referees: El-Saied, El-Saied (EGY)
29 November 2016; 19:00	Paye 4	(9–16)	Natália 8	Arena do Kilamba, Luanda; Referees: El-Saied, El-Saied (EGY)
29 November 2016; 19:00	2× (yellow card) 4× (suspension)		2× (yellow card) 4× (suspension)	Arena do Kilamba, Luanda; Referees: El-Saied, El-Saied (EGY)

30 November 2016; 15:00	Ivory Coast	33–27	DR Congo	Arena do Kilamba, Luanda; Referees: Pinto, Gomes (ANG)
30 November 2016; 15:00	Fofana 9	(14–14)	three players 4	Arena do Kilamba, Luanda; Referees: Pinto, Gomes (ANG)
30 November 2016; 15:00	3× (yellow card) 2× (suspension)		3× (yellow card) 4× (suspension)	Arena do Kilamba, Luanda; Referees: Pinto, Gomes (ANG)

30 November 2016; 19:00	Cameroon	14–30	Angola	Arena do Kilamba, Luanda; Referees: El-Saied, El-Saied (EGY)
30 November 2016; 19:00	Touba 4	(5–16)	Natália 10	Arena do Kilamba, Luanda; Referees: El-Saied, El-Saied (EGY)
30 November 2016; 19:00	2× (yellow card) 7× (suspension)		4× (yellow card) 2× (suspension)	Arena do Kilamba, Luanda; Referees: El-Saied, El-Saied (EGY)

1 December 2016; 17:00	DR Congo	24–26	Cameroon	Arena do Kilamba, Luanda; Referees: Beloum, Zoehinga (BUR)
1 December 2016; 17:00	Mwasesa 13	(9–14)	Touba 15	Arena do Kilamba, Luanda; Referees: Beloum, Zoehinga (BUR)
1 December 2016; 17:00	1× (yellow card) 3× (suspension)		3× (yellow card) 11× (suspension)	Arena do Kilamba, Luanda; Referees: Beloum, Zoehinga (BUR)

1 December 2016; 19:00	Senegal	24–17	Ivory Coast	Arena do Kilamba, Luanda; Referees: El-Saied, El-Saied (EGY)
1 December 2016; 19:00	Cissé, Paye 4	(12–9)	Issifou	Arena do Kilamba, Luanda; Referees: El-Saied, El-Saied (EGY)
1 December 2016; 19:00	4× (yellow card) 4× (suspension)		2× (yellow card) 7× (suspension)	Arena do Kilamba, Luanda; Referees: El-Saied, El-Saied (EGY)

2 December 2016; 15:00	Cameroon	15-24	Senegal	Arena do Kilamba, Luanda; Referees: Gasmi, Gasmi (FRA)
2 December 2016; 15:00	Manga 4	(6–12)	Cissé 5	Arena do Kilamba, Luanda; Referees: Gasmi, Gasmi (FRA)
2 December 2016; 15:00	3× (yellow card) 6× (suspension)		3× (yellow card) 5× (suspension)	Arena do Kilamba, Luanda; Referees: Gasmi, Gasmi (FRA)

2 December 2016; 19:00	Angola	38–19	DR Congo	Arena do Kilamba, Luanda; Referees: Akpatsa, Assignon (TOG)
2 December 2016; 19:00	Viegas 10	(18–11)	Oholanga 9	Arena do Kilamba, Luanda; Referees: Akpatsa, Assignon (TOG)
2 December 2016; 19:00	3× (yellow card) 4× (suspension)		2× (yellow card) 2× (suspension)	Arena do Kilamba, Luanda; Referees: Akpatsa, Assignon (TOG)

=== Group B ===
Pos	Team	Pld	W	D	L	GF	GA	GD	Pts	Qualification
1	Tunisia	3	3	0	0	87	68	+19	6	Quarterfinals
2	Congo	3	2	0	1	83	63	+20	4	Quarterfinals
3	Guinea	3	1	0	2	64	84	−20	2	Quarterfinals
4	Algeria	3	0	0	3	57	76	−19	0	Quarterfinals

Source: CAHB
Rules for classification: 1) points; 2) head-to-head points; 3) head-to-head goal difference; 4) head-to-head number of goals scored; 5) goal difference.

28 November 2016; 11:00	Tunisia	34–22	Guinea	Arena do Kilamba, Luanda
28 November 2016; 11:00	Hamrouni 11	(15–11)	Amadi 5	Arena do Kilamba, Luanda
28 November 2016; 11:00	2× (yellow card) 3× (suspension)		2× (yellow card) 7× (suspension)	Arena do Kilamba, Luanda

29 November 2016; 11:00	Algeria	19–25	Congo	Arena do Kilamba, Luanda; Referees: Beloum, Zoehinga (BUR)
29 November 2016; 11:00	Hadi 5	(10–13)	Okoumba, Mavoungou 5	Arena do Kilamba, Luanda; Referees: Beloum, Zoehinga (BUR)
29 November 2016; 11:00	2× (yellow card) 5× (suspension)		2× (yellow card) 5× (suspension)	Arena do Kilamba, Luanda; Referees: Beloum, Zoehinga (BUR)

30 November 2016; 17:00	Congo	25–26	Tunisia	Arena do Kilamba, Luanda
30 November 2016; 17:00	four players 5	(13–16)	Hamrouni 5	Arena do Kilamba, Luanda
30 November 2016; 17:00	1× (yellow card) 4× (suspension) 1× (red card)		3× (yellow card) 5× (suspension)	Arena do Kilamba, Luanda

1 December 2016; 15:00	Guinea	24–17	Algeria	Arena do Kilamba, Luanda; Referees: Tshilanda, Amba (COD)
1 December 2016; 15:00	Gomis 6	(13–7)	Haïmer, Hemissi 3	Arena do Kilamba, Luanda; Referees: Tshilanda, Amba (COD)
1 December 2016; 15:00	4× (yellow card) 7× (suspension)		2× (yellow card) 6× (suspension)	Arena do Kilamba, Luanda; Referees: Tshilanda, Amba (COD)

2 December 2016; 13:00	Congo	33–18	Guinea	Arena do Kilamba, Luanda; Referees: El-Saied, El-Saied (EGY)
2 December 2016; 13:00	Mambou 8	(13–7)	Correa, Gomis 5	Arena do Kilamba, Luanda; Referees: El-Saied, El-Saied (EGY)
2 December 2016; 13:00	3× (yellow card) 6× (suspension) 1× (red card)		3× (yellow card) 9× (suspension)	Arena do Kilamba, Luanda; Referees: El-Saied, El-Saied (EGY)

2 December 2016; 17:00	Tunisia	27–21	Algeria	Arena do Kilamba, Luanda; Referees: Faye, Diop (SEN)
2 December 2016; 17:00		(14–9)		Arena do Kilamba, Luanda; Referees: Faye, Diop (SEN)

== Knockout stage ==
=== Bracket ===
Quarterfinals
4 December
Angola	42
Algeria	19
4 December
Cameroon	32
Congo	27
4 December
~~Senegal~~ (DSQ)	27
Guinea	15
4 December
Ivory Coast	26
Tunisia	38

Semifinals
5 December
Angola	31
Cameroon	19
5 December
~~Senegal~~ (DSQ)	26
Tunisia	20

Final
7 December
Angola	36
Tunisia	17
Third place
7 December
Cameroon	w/o
~~Senegal~~ (DSQ)

5–8th place bracket

5–8th place semifinals
5 December
Algeria	27
Congo	31
5 December
Guinea	20
Ivory Coast	23

Fifth place
6 December
Congo	32
Ivory Coast	24
Seventh place
6 December
Algeria	33
Guinea	26

=== Quarterfinals ===
4 December 2016; 13:00	Ivory Coast	26–38	Tunisia	Arena do Kilamba, Luanda
4 December 2016; 13:00		(13–21)		Arena do Kilamba, Luanda

4 December 2016; 15:00	Cameroon	32–27	Congo	Arena do Kilamba, Luanda
4 December 2016; 15:00		(15–15)		Arena do Kilamba, Luanda

4 December 2016; 17:00	~~Senegal~~	27–15	Guinea	Arena do Kilamba, Luanda
4 December 2016; 17:00		(14–7)		Arena do Kilamba, Luanda

4 December 2016; 19:00	Angola	42–19	Algeria	Arena do Kilamba, Luanda
4 December 2016; 19:00		(22–9)		Arena do Kilamba, Luanda

=== 5–8th place semifinals ===
5 December 2016; 13:00	Algeria	27–31	Congo	Arena do Kilamba, Luanda
5 December 2016; 13:00		(12–16)		Arena do Kilamba, Luanda

5 December 2016; 15:00	Guinea	20–23	Ivory Coast	Arena do Kilamba, Luanda
5 December 2016; 15:00		(10–10)		Arena do Kilamba, Luanda

=== Semifinals ===
After the semifinals, Senegal was disqualified from the tournament for using ineligible player Doungou Camara, since she has already played for the French national team. Tunisia faced Angola in the final and Cameroon automatically occupied the third place.

5 December 2016; 17:00	~~Senegal~~	26–20	Tunisia	Arena do Kilamba, Luanda
5 December 2016; 17:00		(17–11)		Arena do Kilamba, Luanda

5 December 2016; 19:00	Angola	31–19	Cameroon	Arena do Kilamba, Luanda

=== Seventh place game ===
6 December 2016; 17:00	Algeria	33–26	Guinea	Arena do Kilamba, Luanda
6 December 2016; 17:00		(13–11)		Arena do Kilamba, Luanda

=== Fifth place game ===
6 December 2016; 19:00	Congo	32–24	Ivory Coast	Arena do Kilamba, Luanda

=== Third place game ===
7 December 2016; 17:00	Cameroon	Awarded	~~Senegal~~	Arena do Kilamba, Luanda

=== Final ===
7 December 2016; 19:00	Angola	36–17	Tunisia	Arena do Kilamba, Luanda
7 December 2016; 19:00		(16–7)		Arena do Kilamba, Luanda

== Final ranking ==
Qualified for the 2017 World Championship

Rank	Team
Gold medal	Angola
Silver medal	Tunisia
Bronze medal	Cameroon
4	Congo
5	Ivory Coast
6	Algeria
7	Guinea
8	DR Congo
DSQ	Senegal

== Awards ==
2016 African Women's Handball Championship

Angola
12th title

Angolese Natália Bernardo is the Best Player and Tunisian Amal Hamrouni is the top scorer with 40 goals.

=== All-Tournament Team ===
All-star team is

GK	(Angola)	Teresa Almeida
RW	(Angola)	Azenaide Carlos
RB	(Tunisia)	Amal Hamrouni
CB	(Angola)	Natália Bernardo
LB	(Angola)	Magda Cazanga
LW	(Angola)	Joelma Viegas
P	(Angola)	Albertina Kassoma
