= 2014 African Women's Handball Championship =

2014 African Women's Championship
Tournament details
- Host country: Algeria
- Venues: 3 (in 2 host cities)
- Dates: 16–25 January
- Teams: 8 (from 1 confederation)

Final positions
- Champions: Tunisia (3rd title)
- Runners-up: DR Congo
- Third place: Angola
- Fourth place: Algeria

Tournament statistics
- Matches played: 24
- Goals scored: 1,227 (51.13 per match)

The 2014 African Women's Handball Championship was the 21st edition of the African Women's Handball Championship, held in Algiers and Chéraga, Algeria, from 16 to 25 January 2014. It acted as the African qualifying tournament for the 2015 World Women's Handball Championship in Denmark. Tunisia won the title beating DR Congo in the final, which was their first title in 38 years.

== Venues ==
Algiers		2014 African Women's Handball Championship is located in Algeria
Salle Harcha; Capacity: 6,000		2014 African Women's Handball Championship is located in Algeria
Algiers	Chéraga	2014 African Women's Handball Championship is located in Algeria
Salle OMS; Capacity: 15,000	Salle Chéraga; Capacity: 5,000	2014 African Women's Handball Championship is located in Algeria

== Qualification ==
Country	Previous appearances in tournament^{1}
Algeria	14 (1976, 1979, 1981,1983, 1989, 1991, 1992, 1994, 1996, 2000, 2002, 2008, 2010, 2012)
Angola	17 (1981, 1983, 1985, 1987, **1989**, 1991, **1992**, **1994**, 1996, **1998**, **2000**, **2002**, **2004**, **2006**, **2008**, **2010**, **2012**)
Cameroon	13 (1979, 1983, 1985, 1987, 1996, 1998, 2000, 2002, 2004, 2006, 2008, 2010, 2012)
Congo	19 (1976, **1979**, **1981**, **1983**, **1985**, 1987, 1989, 1991, 1992, 1994, 1996, 1998, 2002, 2002, 2004, 2006, 2008, 2010, 2012)
DR Congo	7 (1992, 2002, 2004, 2006, 2008, 2010, 2012)
Guinea	0
Senegal	6 (1974, 1976, 1991, 1992, 2000, 2012)
Tunisia	16 (**1974**, **1976**, 1981, 1983, 1985, 1987, 1989, 1992, 1994, 2000, 2002, 2004, 2006, 2008, 2010, 2012)

^{1} Bold indicates champion for that year. Italics indicates host.

== Draw ==
The draw was held on 9 October 2013.

Group A	Group B
Algeria (squad); DR Congo (squad); Cameroon (squad); Senegal (squad)	Angola (squad); Tunisia (squad); Congo (squad); Guinea (squad)

== Preliminary round ==
Times are local (UTC+1).

=== Group A ===
Team	Pld	W	D	L	GF	GA	GD	Pts
Algeria	3	2	1	0	80	68	+12	**5**
DR Congo	3	2	0	1	69	67	+2	**4**
Senegal	3	1	1	1	71	72	−1	**3**
Cameroon	3	0	0	3	62	75	−13	**0**

16 January 2014; 14:30	**Senegal**	**27–27**	**Algeria**	Salle Harcha, Algiers; Referees: Akpatsa, Assignon (TOG)
16 January 2014; 14:30	Sankare 7	(15–12)	Tizi 6	Salle Harcha, Algiers; Referees: Akpatsa, Assignon (TOG)
16 January 2014; 14:30	3× (yellow card) 6× (suspension)	Report	2× (yellow card) 3× (suspension) 1× (red card)	Salle Harcha, Algiers; Referees: Akpatsa, Assignon (TOG)

16 January 2014; 14:30	**Cameroon**	**20–25**	**DR Congo**	Salle Chéraga, Chéraga; Referees: Benfetima, Benfetima (ALG)
16 January 2014; 14:30	Ngo Nleng 5	(10–14)	Mwasesa 7	Salle Chéraga, Chéraga; Referees: Benfetima, Benfetima (ALG)
16 January 2014; 14:30	3× (yellow card) 7× (suspension)	Report	2× (yellow card) 5× (suspension)	Salle Chéraga, Chéraga; Referees: Benfetima, Benfetima (ALG)

17 January 2014; 13:30	**Algeria**	**26–21**	**Cameroon**	Salle Harcha, Algiers; Referees: Allade, Dagba (BEN)
17 January 2014; 13:30	Tizi 10	(13–8)	Ngo Nleng 5	Salle Harcha, Algiers; Referees: Allade, Dagba (BEN)
17 January 2014; 13:30	4× (yellow card) 5× (suspension)	Report	2× (yellow card) 4× (suspension)	Salle Harcha, Algiers; Referees: Allade, Dagba (BEN)

17 January 2014; 15:00	**DR Congo**	**24–20**	**Senegal**	Salle Chéraga, Chéraga; Referees: Boualloucha, Khenissir (TUN)
17 January 2014; 15:00	Okoko 7	(12–7)	Cissé 6	Salle Chéraga, Chéraga; Referees: Boualloucha, Khenissir (TUN)
17 January 2014; 15:00	3× (yellow card) 4× (suspension)	Report	3× (yellow card) 3× (suspension)	Salle Chéraga, Chéraga; Referees: Boualloucha, Khenissir (TUN)

20 January 2014; 13:30	**Algeria**	**27–20**	**DR Congo**	Salle Harcha, Algiers; Referees: Camara, Diakite (GUI)
20 January 2014; 13:30	Tizi 7	(12–10)	Mwasesa 6	Salle Harcha, Algiers; Referees: Camara, Diakite (GUI)
20 January 2014; 13:30	3× (yellow card) 4× (suspension)	Report	2× (yellow card) 1× (suspension)	Salle Harcha, Algiers; Referees: Camara, Diakite (GUI)

20 January 2014; 15:00	**Cameroon**	**21–24**	**Senegal**	Salle Chéraga, Chéraga; Referees: Deche, Ghouarda (ALG)
20 January 2014; 15:00	Chouapouognigni, Ngo 5	(11–11)	Beng, Gomis 4	Salle Chéraga, Chéraga; Referees: Deche, Ghouarda (ALG)
20 January 2014; 15:00	4× (yellow card) 9× (suspension)	Report	3× (yellow card) 7× (suspension)	Salle Chéraga, Chéraga; Referees: Deche, Ghouarda (ALG)

=== Group B ===
Team	Pld	W	D	L	GF	GA	GD	Pts
Angola	3	3	0	0	102	51	+51	**6**
Tunisia (H)	3	2	0	1	83	71	+12	**4**
Congo	3	1	0	2	81	83	−2	**2**
Guinea	3	0	0	3	48	109	−61	**0**

(H) Hosts

16 January 2014; 10:00	**Tunisia**	**32–16**	**Guinea**	Salle OMS, Algiers; Referees: Amba, Tsihlanda (COD)
16 January 2014; 10:00	Daoula 7	(14–10)	Bangoura 4	Salle OMS, Algiers; Referees: Amba, Tsihlanda (COD)
16 January 2014; 10:00	3× (yellow card) 3× (suspension)	Report	2× (yellow card) 5× (suspension)	Salle OMS, Algiers; Referees: Amba, Tsihlanda (COD)

16 January 2014; 14:30	**Angola**	**33–18**	**Congo**	Salle OMS, Algiers; Referees: Diop, Faye (SEN)
16 January 2014; 14:30	Morais, Guialo 5	(15–10)	Mambou 4	Salle OMS, Algiers; Referees: Diop, Faye (SEN)
16 January 2014; 14:30	3× (yellow card) 4× (suspension)	Report	2× (yellow card) 5× (suspension)	Salle OMS, Algiers; Referees: Diop, Faye (SEN)

18 January 2014; 13:30	**Congo**	**30–32**	**Tunisia**	Salle Harcha, Algiers; Referees: Akpatsa, Assignon (TOG)
18 January 2014; 13:30	Itoua 8	(12–16)	Chebbah 9	Salle Harcha, Algiers; Referees: Akpatsa, Assignon (TOG)
18 January 2014; 13:30	2× (yellow card)	Report	3× (yellow card) 4× (suspension)	Salle Harcha, Algiers; Referees: Akpatsa, Assignon (TOG)

18 January 2014; 15:00	**Guinea**	**14–44**	**Angola**	Salle Chéraga, Chéraga; Referees: Amba, Tshilanda (CGO)
18 January 2014; 15:00	Diaby 5	(7–23)	Morais, Monteiro 6	Salle Chéraga, Chéraga; Referees: Amba, Tshilanda (CGO)
18 January 2014; 15:00	2× (yellow card) 7× (suspension) 1× (red card)	Report	3× (yellow card) 2× (suspension)	Salle Chéraga, Chéraga; Referees: Amba, Tshilanda (CGO)

21 January 2014; 14:00	**Angola**	**25–19**	**Tunisia**	Salle OMS, Algiers; Referees: Diop, Faye (SEN)
21 January 2014; 14:00	three players 4	(12–12)	Elghaoui 5	Salle OMS, Algiers; Referees: Diop, Faye (SEN)
21 January 2014; 14:00	2× (yellow card) 2× (suspension)	Report	4× (yellow card) 4× (suspension)	Salle OMS, Algiers; Referees: Diop, Faye (SEN)

21 January 2014; 15:00	**Congo**	**33–18**	**Guinea**	Salle Chéraga, Chéraga; Referees: Deche, Ghouarda (ALG)
21 January 2014; 15:00		(16–13)		Salle Chéraga, Chéraga; Referees: Deche, Ghouarda (ALG)
21 January 2014; 15:00		Report		Salle Chéraga, Chéraga; Referees: Deche, Ghouarda (ALG)

== Knockout stage ==
=== Bracket ===
Quarterfinals
A1	**Algeria**	**25**
B4	Guinea	17
A2	**DR Congo**	**27**
B3	Congo	22
B2	**Tunisia**	**31**
A3	Senegal	27
B1	**Angola**	**28**
A4	Cameroon	23

Semifinals
A1	Algeria	23
A2	**DR Congo**	**28**
B2	**Tunisia** (OT)	**31**
B1	Angola	30

Final
A2	DR Congo	20
B2	**Tunisia**	**23**
Third place
A1	Algeria	22
B1	**Angola**	**30**

5–8th place bracket

5–8th place semifinals
23 January
Guinea	19
**Congo**	**40**
23 January
**Senegal**	**25**
Cameroon	21

Fifth place game
24 January
**Congo**	**30**
Senegal	29
Seventh place game
24 January
Guinea	18
**Cameroon**	**42**

=== Quarterfinals ===
22 January 2014; 13:45	**Algeria**	**25–17**	**Guinea**	Salle Harcha, Algiers; Referees: Diop, Faye (SEN)
22 January 2014; 13:45	Tizi 7	(14–8)	Keita, Delpine 5	Salle Harcha, Algiers; Referees: Diop, Faye (SEN)
22 January 2014; 13:45	2× (yellow card) 4× (suspension)	Report	1× (yellow card) 6× (suspension)	Salle Harcha, Algiers; Referees: Diop, Faye (SEN)

22 January 2014; 14:30	**DR Congo**	**27–22**	**Congo**	Salle OMS, Algiers; Referees: Camara, Diakite (GUI)
22 January 2014; 14:30	Mwasesa 8	(13–13)	Mavoungou 5	Salle OMS, Algiers; Referees: Camara, Diakite (GUI)
22 January 2014; 14:30	3× (yellow card) 3× (suspension)	Report	3× (yellow card) 1× (suspension)	Salle OMS, Algiers; Referees: Camara, Diakite (GUI)

22 January 2014; 16:00	**Angola**	**28–23**	**Cameroon**	Salle Harcha, Algiers; Referees: Benfetima, Benfetima (ALG)
22 January 2014; 16:00	Pedro 7	(17–11)	Melingui, Ngo 4	Salle Harcha, Algiers; Referees: Benfetima, Benfetima (ALG)
22 January 2014; 16:00	3× (yellow card) 4× (suspension)	Report	2× (yellow card) 6× (suspension)	Salle Harcha, Algiers; Referees: Benfetima, Benfetima (ALG)

22 January 2014; 16:45	**Tunisia**	**31–27**	**Senegal**	Salle OMS, Algiers; Referees: Amba, Tsihlanda (COD)
22 January 2014; 16:45		(17–13)		Salle OMS, Algiers; Referees: Amba, Tsihlanda (COD)
22 January 2014; 16:45		Report		Salle OMS, Algiers; Referees: Amba, Tsihlanda (COD)

=== 5–8th place semifinals ===
23 January 2014; 15:00	**Senegal**	**25–21**	**Cameroon**	Salle OMS, Algiers
23 January 2014; 15:00		(13–8)		Salle OMS, Algiers

23 January 2014; 17:15	**Guinea**	**19–40**	**Congo**	Salle Harcha, Algiers; Referees: Bouallouchia, Khenissi (TUN)
23 January 2014; 17:15	Delpine 7	(9–15)	Zoubabela 8	Salle Harcha, Algiers; Referees: Bouallouchia, Khenissi (TUN)
23 January 2014; 17:15	3× (yellow card) 1× (suspension)	Report	3× (yellow card) 1× (suspension)	Salle Harcha, Algiers; Referees: Bouallouchia, Khenissi (TUN)

=== Semifinals ===
24 January 2014
11:30
Angola
**30–31** **(ET)**
Tunisia
Salle Harcha, Algiers
Referees: Coulibaly, Diabate (CIV)
M. Kiala 12
(12–14)
Chebbah 9
3× (yellow card) 5× (suspension)
Report
2× (yellow card) 6× (suspension)

FT: 26–26 ET: 4–5

24 January 2014; 13:45	**Algeria**	**23–28**	**DR Congo**	Salle Harcha, Algiers; Referees: Allade, Dagba (BEN)
24 January 2014; 13:45	Tizi 9	(10–12)	Mwasesa 8	Salle Harcha, Algiers; Referees: Allade, Dagba (BEN)
24 January 2014; 13:45	3× (yellow card) 8× (suspension)	Report	2× (yellow card) 4× (suspension)	Salle Harcha, Algiers; Referees: Allade, Dagba (BEN)

=== Seventh place game ===
24 January 2014; 09:00	**Guinea**	**18–42**	**Cameroon**	Salle OMS, Algiers; Referees: Amba, Tshilanda (COD)
24 January 2014; 09:00	Delpine 8	(11–22)	Eyanga 11	Salle OMS, Algiers; Referees: Amba, Tshilanda (COD)
24 January 2014; 09:00	3× (yellow card) 2× (suspension)	Report	2× (yellow card) 4× (suspension)	Salle OMS, Algiers; Referees: Amba, Tshilanda (COD)

=== Fifth place ===
24 January 2014; 13:00	**Congo**	**30–29**	**Senegal**	Salle OMS, Algiers
24 January 2014; 13:00		(16–13)		Salle OMS, Algiers

=== Third place game ===
25 January 2014; 11:30	**Algeria**	**22–30**	**Angola**	Salle Harcha, Algiers; Referees: Mohamed, Tamer (EGY)
25 January 2014; 11:30	Belakhdar 6	(10–18)	Cazanga 10	Salle Harcha, Algiers; Referees: Mohamed, Tamer (EGY)
25 January 2014; 11:30	3× (yellow card) 4× (suspension)	Report	2× (yellow card) 6× (suspension)	Salle Harcha, Algiers; Referees: Mohamed, Tamer (EGY)

=== Final ===
25 January 2014; 16:00	**DR Congo**	**20–23**	**Tunisia**	Salle Harcha, Algiers; Referees: Diop, Faye (SEN)
25 January 2014; 16:00	Mwasesa 9	(11–10)	Toumi, Marzouk 5	Salle Harcha, Algiers; Referees: Diop, Faye (SEN)
25 January 2014; 16:00	2× (yellow card) 6× (suspension)	Report	4× (yellow card) 6× (suspension)	Salle Harcha, Algiers; Referees: Diop, Faye (SEN)

== Final ranking ==
Qualified for the 2015 World Championship

Rank	Team
Gold medal	Tunisia
Silver medal	DR Congo
Bronze medal	Angola
4	Algeria
5	Congo
6	Senegal
7	Cameroon
8	Guinea
