= Sedi =

Sedi may refer to:

- Sedi Township, Sichuan, China
- Sədi, Azerbaijan
