= Souad =

Suad (Arabic: سعاد, Su‘ad), Souad, or Soad is an Arabic given name. It means "good luck, good fortune, happiness, auspicious, prosperous, favorable", and stems from the Arabic verb سَعَدَ (sa‘ada, 'to be happy, to be fortunate, to be lucky'). It is a variant of the Arabic given name Saad.

It is originally a female given name. However, it is also used for men.

Suad is also the name of a tribe and the Arabic name of an ancient deity.

The name may refer to:

== Given name ==
=== Souad ===
- Souad, the author of Burned Alive
- Souad Abderrahim (born 1964), Tunisian politician
- Souad Abdullah (born 1950), Kuwaiti actress
- Souad Aït Salem (born 1979), Algerian long-distance runner
- Souad Amidou (born 1959), French actress
- Souad Bendjaballah, Algerian lawyer, activist for women's rights and politician
- Souad Cherouati (born 1989), Algerian swimmer
- Souad Dibi, Moroccan feminist activist
- Souad Dinar (born 1977), French weightlifter
- Souad Faress (born 1948), Ghanaian, British stage, radio, television and film actress of Syrian descent
- Souad Massi (born 1972), Algerian singer
- Souad Mekhennet (born 1978), German journalist
- Souad Kassim Mohamed (born 1976), Djiboutian linguist
- Souad Nawfal, Syrian schoolteacher and activist
- Souad Oulhaj (born 1974), Moroccan football referee
- Souad Titou (born 1986), Algerian handball player
- Souad (film), an Egyptian film
- Souad Rischmaui (born 1975), Chilean Pastry Chef

=== Soad ===
- Soad Fezzani, Libyan swimmer
- Soad Hosny (1943–2001), Egyptian actress and singer

=== Suad ===
- Suad Amiry (born 1951), Palestinian author and architect
- Suad al-Attar (born 1942), Iraqi painter
- Suad Beširević (1963–2019), Slovenian footballer and football manager of Bosnian origin
- Suad Fileković (born 1978), Slovenian footballer
- Suad Gruda (born 1991), Swedish and Montenegrin footballer
- Suad Joseph (born 1943), American anthropologist of Lebanese origin
- Suad Kalesić (1954–2025), Bosnian footballer
- Suad Nasr (1953–2007), Egyptian stage, television, and film actress
- Suad Nokić (born 1993), Serbian-Bosniak footballer
- Suad Sahiti (born 1995), Kosovo Albanian professional footballer
- Suad Salih (born 1945), Egyptian comparative fiqh professor at Al-Azhar University
- Suad Šehović (born 1987), Montenegrin basketball player
- Suad Al-Shammari (born 1966), Saudi Arabian women's rights activist
- Suad Švraka (1927–1995), Bosnian and Yugoslav footballer
- Suad Zeljković (born 1960), Bosnian politician who served as the Prime Minister of the Sarajevo Canton, one of Bosnia and Herzegovina's ten cantons

== Surname ==
- Mohamed Abdou El-Souad (born 1968), Egyptian pentathlete

== See also ==
- Soad (disambiguation)
