= Handball at the 2012 Summer Olympics – Women's qualification =

The qualification for the 2012 Women's Olympic Handball Tournament was held from December 2010 to May 2012.

== Qualification summary ==
	Date	Venue	Vacancies	Qualified
Host Nation			1	Great Britain
2010 European Championship	7–19 December 2010	Denmark & Norway	1	Sweden ^{*}
2011 Asian Olympic Qualification Tournament	12–21 October	China	1	South Korea
2011 Pan American Games	15–23 October 2011	Mexico	1	Brazil
2011 World Championship	2–18 December 2011	Brazil	1	Norway
2012 African Championship	11–20 January 2012	Morocco	1	Angola
2012 IHF Qualification Tournament #1	25–27 May 2012	France	2	Montenegro; France
2012 IHF Qualification Tournament #2	25–27 May 2012	Spain	2	Spain; Croatia
2012 IHF Qualification Tournament #3	25–27 May 2012	Denmark	2	Russia; Denmark
Total			12	

^{*} Sweden qualified as 2010 European Championship runner-up because Norway qualified as the 2011 World Champion.

Legend for qualification type
Team qualified to the 2012 Olympic Tournament
Team qualified from the World Championship to the Olympic Qualification Tournament
Team qualified from Continental Events to the Olympic Qualification Tournament

== World Championship ==
Notes:

- The six best teams not yet qualified for the 2012 Olympic Games qualified for one of the three World Olympic qualification tournaments (each one hosted by one of the three best teams).
- Qualification to the Olympic qualification tournament through the World Championship supersedes qualification through the Continental Championship.

Rank	Team
1st place, gold medalist(s)	Norway
2nd place, silver medalist(s)	France
3rd place, bronze medalist(s)	Spain
4	Denmark
5	Brazil
6	Russia
7	Croatia
8	Angola
9	Sweden
10	Montenegro
11	South Korea
12	Iceland
13	Romania
14	Japan
15	Netherlands
16	Ivory Coast
17	Germany
18	Tunisia
19	Kazakhstan
20	Uruguay
21	China
22	Cuba
23	Argentina
24	Australia

== Continental qualification ==
=== Europe (1st ranking continent) ===
Notes:

- Because Norway was both European and World Champion, Sweden went directly to the Olympic Tournament in London on the European Champions spot.

Rank	Team
1st place, gold medalist(s)	Norway
2nd place, silver medalist(s)	Sweden
3rd place, bronze medalist(s)	Romania
4	Denmark
5	France
6	Montenegro
7	Russia
8	Netherlands
9	Croatia
10	Hungary
11	Spain
12	Ukraine
13	Germany
14	Serbia
15	Iceland
16	Slovenia

=== America (2nd ranking continent) ===
- The winner qualified for the Olympic Tournament, while the runner-up and third-place team (since Australia placed 24th) qualified for one of the qualification tournaments.

Rank	Team
1st place, gold medalist(s)	Brazil
2nd place, silver medalist(s)	Argentina
3rd place, bronze medalist(s)	Dominican Republic
4	Mexico
5	Chile
6	Puerto Rico
7	Uruguay
8	United States

=== Africa (3rd ranking continent) ===
- The winner qualified for the Olympic Tournament, while the runner-up qualified for one of the qualification tournaments.

Rank	Team
1st place, gold medalist(s)	Angola
2nd place, silver medalist(s)	Tunisia
3rd place, bronze medalist(s)	DR Congo
4	Algeria
5	Cameroon
6	Congo
7	Ivory Coast
8	Senegal
9	Egypt
10	Morocco

=== Asia (4th ranking continent) ===
- The winner qualified for the Olympic Tournament, while the runner-up qualified for one of the qualification tournaments.

Pos	Team	Pld	W	D	L	GF	GA	GD	Pts
1st place, gold medalist(s)	South Korea	5	5	0	0	183	104	+79	10
2nd place, silver medalist(s)	Japan	5	4	0	1	160	109	+51	8
3rd place, bronze medalist(s)	China	5	3	0	2	131	110	+21	6
4	North Korea	5	1	1	3	133	134	−1	3
5	Kazakhstan	5	1	1	3	119	127	−8	3
6	Turkmenistan	5	0	0	5	48	190	−142	0

== 2012 IHF Qualification Tournaments ==
2012 IHF Qualification Tournament #1	2012 IHF Qualification Tournament #2	2012 IHF Qualification Tournament #3
2nd from World (2nd place World 2011): France; 7th from World (10th place World 2011): Montenegro; 2nd from Continent 1 (3rd place Europe 2010): Romania; 2nd from Continent 4 (2nd place Asia 2011): Japan	3rd from World (3rd place World 2011): Spain; 6th from World (7th place World 2011): Croatia; 2nd from Continent 2 (2nd place Americas 2011): Argentina; 3rd from Continent 1 (8th place Europe 2010): Netherlands	4th from World (4th place World 2011): Denmark; 5th from World (6th place World 2011): Russia; 2nd from Continent 3 (2nd place Africa 2012): Tunisia; 3rd from Continent 2 (3rd place Americas 2011): Dominican Republic

Note :

- Continents are ranked based on the 2011 World Championship results.
- If the Oceania representative at the 2011 World Championship had placed from 8th to 12th, Oceania would have earned a spot for IHF Qualification Tournament #3 : Oceania's representative (Australia) placed 24th so, Dominican Republic, 3rd from Continent 2 (3rd place Americas 2011), qualified.

=== 2012 IHF Qualification Tournament #1 ===
- Venue: Palais des Sports de Gerland, Lyon, France
- All times are Central European Time (UTC+01:00).

Team	Pld	W	D	L	GF	GA	GD	Pts
Montenegro	3	3	0	0	86	67	+19	6
France	3	2	0	1	74	58	+16	4
Romania	3	1	0	2	70	84	−14	2
Japan	3	0	0	3	67	88	−21	0

25 May 2012; 16:45	Montenegro	30 − 24	Japan	Palais des Sports de Gerland, Lyon; Attendance: 1,500; Referees: Eliasson J, Gudjonsson I (ISL)
25 May 2012; 16:45	Bulatović 8	(14–13)	Fujii 8	Palais des Sports de Gerland, Lyon; Attendance: 1,500; Referees: Eliasson J, Gudjonsson I (ISL)
25 May 2012; 16:45	4× (yellow card) 4× (suspension)	Report	3× (yellow card) 2× (suspension)	Palais des Sports de Gerland, Lyon; Attendance: 1,500; Referees: Eliasson J, Gudjonsson I (ISL)

25 May 2012; 19:00	France	24 − 19	Romania	Palais des Sports de Gerland, Lyon; Attendance: 3,500; Referees: Gatelis M, Mazeika V (LTU)
25 May 2012; 19:00	Lacrabère 4	(12–9)	Meiroşu 6	Palais des Sports de Gerland, Lyon; Attendance: 3,500; Referees: Gatelis M, Mazeika V (LTU)
25 May 2012; 19:00	3× (yellow card) 2× (suspension)	Report	3× (yellow card) 2× (suspension)	Palais des Sports de Gerland, Lyon; Attendance: 3,500; Referees: Gatelis M, Mazeika V (LTU)

26 May 2012; 14:45	Romania	23 – 34	Montenegro	Palais des Sports de Gerland, Lyon; Attendance: 3,200; Referees: Caçador I, Nicolau E (POR)
26 May 2012; 14:45	Nechita, Ardean-Elisei 6	(13–17)	Bulatović 7	Palais des Sports de Gerland, Lyon; Attendance: 3,200; Referees: Caçador I, Nicolau E (POR)
26 May 2012; 14:45	4× (yellow card) 3× (suspension)	Report	1× (yellow card) 5× (suspension)	Palais des Sports de Gerland, Lyon; Attendance: 3,200; Referees: Caçador I, Nicolau E (POR)

26 May 2012; 17:00	Japan	17 – 30	France	Palais des Sports de Gerland, Lyon; Attendance: 4,200; Referees: Gatelis M, Mazeika V (LTU)
26 May 2012; 17:00	Kamimachi 5	(7–13)	Baudouin 7	Palais des Sports de Gerland, Lyon; Attendance: 4,200; Referees: Gatelis M, Mazeika V (LTU)
26 May 2012; 17:00	3× (yellow card) 2× (suspension)	Report	3× (yellow card) 3× (suspension)	Palais des Sports de Gerland, Lyon; Attendance: 4,200; Referees: Gatelis M, Mazeika V (LTU)

27 May 2012; 14:15	Romania	28 – 26	Japan	Palais des Sports de Gerland, Lyon; Attendance: 2,800; Referees: Caçador I, Nicolau E (POR)
27 May 2012; 14:15	Ani-Senocico 6	(18–10)	Fujii 7	Palais des Sports de Gerland, Lyon; Attendance: 2,800; Referees: Caçador I, Nicolau E (POR)
27 May 2012; 14:15	3× (yellow card)	Report	3× (yellow card) 1× (suspension)	Palais des Sports de Gerland, Lyon; Attendance: 2,800; Referees: Caçador I, Nicolau E (POR)

27 May 2012; 16:30	France	20 – 22	Montenegro	Palais des Sports de Gerland, Lyon; Attendance: 4,300; Referees: Eliasson J, Gudjonsson I (ISL)
27 May 2012; 16:30	Baudouin 4	(9–9)	Knežević 7	Palais des Sports de Gerland, Lyon; Attendance: 4,300; Referees: Eliasson J, Gudjonsson I (ISL)
27 May 2012; 16:30	3× (yellow card) 3× (suspension)	Report	3× (yellow card) 5× (suspension)	Palais des Sports de Gerland, Lyon; Attendance: 4,300; Referees: Eliasson J, Gudjonsson I (ISL)

=== 2012 IHF Qualification Tournament #2 ===
- Venue: Palacio Multiusos, Guadalajara, Spain
- All times are Central European Time (UTC+01:00).

Team	Pld	W	D	L	GF	GA	GD	Pts
Spain (+3)	3	2	0	1	81	62	+19	4
Croatia (0)	3	2	0	1	82	72	+10	4
Netherlands (-3)	3	2	0	1	83	77	+6	4
Argentina	3	0	0	3	57	91	−34	0

25 May 2012; 10:45	Croatia	28 − 29	Netherlands	Palacio Multiusos, Guadalajara; Attendance: 800; Referees: Bonaventura C, Bonaventura J (FRA)
25 May 2012; 10:45	Zebić 11	(12–14)	Abbingh 10	Palacio Multiusos, Guadalajara; Attendance: 800; Referees: Bonaventura C, Bonaventura J (FRA)
25 May 2012; 10:45	4× (yellow card) 3× (suspension)	Report	3× (yellow card) 5× (suspension)	Palacio Multiusos, Guadalajara; Attendance: 800; Referees: Bonaventura C, Bonaventura J (FRA)

25 May 2012; 13:00	Spain	31 − 15	Argentina	Palacio Multiusos, Guadalajara; Attendance: 2,500; Referees: Coulibaly, Diabaté (CIV)
25 May 2012; 13:00	Mangué 6	(15–9)	Decilio, Salvado 4	Palacio Multiusos, Guadalajara; Attendance: 2,500; Referees: Coulibaly, Diabaté (CIV)
25 May 2012; 13:00	1× (yellow card) 5× (suspension)	Report	3× (yellow card) 4× (suspension)	Palacio Multiusos, Guadalajara; Attendance: 2,500; Referees: Coulibaly, Diabaté (CIV)

26 May 2012; 10:45	Argentina	21 – 31	Croatia	Palacio Multiusos, Guadalajara; Attendance: 500; Referees: Coulibaly, Diabaté (CIV)
26 May 2012; 10:45	Mendoza 7	(10–18)	Jovetić, Pušić-Koroljević 5	Palacio Multiusos, Guadalajara; Attendance: 500; Referees: Coulibaly, Diabaté (CIV)
26 May 2012; 10:45	3× (yellow card) 1× (suspension)	Report	3× (yellow card) 6× (suspension)	Palacio Multiusos, Guadalajara; Attendance: 500; Referees: Coulibaly, Diabaté (CIV)

26 May 2012; 13:00	Netherlands	24 – 28	Spain	Palacio Multiusos, Guadalajara; Attendance: 2,400; Referees: Geipel, Helbig (GER)
26 May 2012; 13:00	van der Heijden, Abbingh 5	(13–14)	Alberto 11	Palacio Multiusos, Guadalajara; Attendance: 2,400; Referees: Geipel, Helbig (GER)
26 May 2012; 13:00	4× (yellow card) 4× (suspension)	Report	4× (yellow card) 2× (suspension)	Palacio Multiusos, Guadalajara; Attendance: 2,400; Referees: Geipel, Helbig (GER)

27 May 2012; 10:15	Argentina	21 – 30	Netherlands	Palacio Multiusos, Guadalajara; Attendance: 475; Referees: Bonaventura C, Bonaventura J (FRA)
27 May 2012; 10:15	Decilio 5	(9–15)	Broch 6	Palacio Multiusos, Guadalajara; Attendance: 475; Referees: Bonaventura C, Bonaventura J (FRA)
27 May 2012; 10:15	3× (yellow card) 4× (suspension)	Report	3× (yellow card) 4× (suspension)	Palacio Multiusos, Guadalajara; Attendance: 475; Referees: Bonaventura C, Bonaventura J (FRA)

27 May 2012; 12:30	Spain	22 – 23	Croatia	Palacio Multiusos, Guadalajara; Attendance: 3,000; Referees: Geipel, Helbig (GER)
27 May 2012; 12:30	Martín 9	(10–12)	Zebić 8	Palacio Multiusos, Guadalajara; Attendance: 3,000; Referees: Geipel, Helbig (GER)
27 May 2012; 12:30	2× (yellow card) 3× (suspension)	Report	2× (yellow card) 8× (suspension)	Palacio Multiusos, Guadalajara; Attendance: 3,000; Referees: Geipel, Helbig (GER)

=== 2012 IHF Qualification Tournament #3 ===
- Venue: Gigantium, Aalborg, Denmark
- All times are Central European Time (UTC+01:00).

Team	Pld	W	D	L	GF	GA	GD	Pts
Russia	3	3	0	0	101	57	+44	6
Denmark	3	2	0	1	86	72	+14	4
Tunisia	3	1	0	2	73	81	−8	2
Dominican Republic	3	0	0	3	58	108	−50	0

25 May 2012; 18:15	Russia	41 − 17	Dominican Republic	Gigantium, Aalborg; Attendance: 400; Referees: Florescu D, Duta A (ROU)
25 May 2012; 18:15	three players 5	(20–10)	Andino 8	Gigantium, Aalborg; Attendance: 400; Referees: Florescu D, Duta A (ROU)
25 May 2012; 18:15	3× (yellow card) 2× (suspension)	Report	2× (yellow card) 4× (suspension)	Gigantium, Aalborg; Attendance: 400; Referees: Florescu D, Duta A (ROU)

25 May 2012; 20:15	Denmark	28 − 24	Tunisia	Gigantium, Aalborg; Attendance: 2,500; Referees: Nachevski G, Nikolov S (MKD)
25 May 2012; 20:15	Nørgaard 11	(12−13)	Toumi, Chebbah 7	Gigantium, Aalborg; Attendance: 2,500; Referees: Nachevski G, Nikolov S (MKD)
25 May 2012; 20:15	3× (yellow card) 6× (suspension)	Report	3× (yellow card) 1× (suspension) 1× (red card)	Gigantium, Aalborg; Attendance: 2,500; Referees: Nachevski G, Nikolov S (MKD)

26 May 2012; 18:45	Tunisia	20 – 33	Russia	Gigantium, Aalborg; Attendance: 300; Referees: Horvath P, Marton B (HUN)
26 May 2012; 18:45	Toumi 12	(8–17)	Chernoivanenko, Postnova 5	Gigantium, Aalborg; Attendance: 300; Referees: Horvath P, Marton B (HUN)
26 May 2012; 18:45	3× (yellow card) 2× (suspension)	Report	3× (yellow card) 3× (suspension)	Gigantium, Aalborg; Attendance: 300; Referees: Horvath P, Marton B (HUN)

26 May 2012; 20:45	Dominican Republic	21 – 38	Denmark	Gigantium, Aalborg; Attendance: 880; Referees: Florescu D, Duta A (ROU)
26 May 2012; 20:45	Andino, Pop 6	(13–20)	Augustesen, Dalby 6	Gigantium, Aalborg; Attendance: 880; Referees: Florescu D, Duta A (ROU)
26 May 2012; 20:45	3× (yellow card) 4× (suspension)	Report	3× (yellow card) 2× (suspension)	Gigantium, Aalborg; Attendance: 880; Referees: Florescu D, Duta A (ROU)

27 May 2012; 18:15	Tunisia	29 – 20	Dominican Republic	Gigantium, Aalborg; Attendance: 1,200; Referees: Horvath P, Marton B (HUN)
27 May 2012; 18:15	Toumi 10	(17–8)	Andino 6	Gigantium, Aalborg; Attendance: 1,200; Referees: Horvath P, Marton B (HUN)
27 May 2012; 18:15	3× (yellow card) 4× (suspension)	Report	3× (yellow card) 6× (suspension)	Gigantium, Aalborg; Attendance: 1,200; Referees: Horvath P, Marton B (HUN)

27 May 2012; 20:15	Denmark	20 – 27	Russia	Gigantium, Aalborg; Attendance: 3,000; Referees: Nachevski G, Nikolov S (MKD)
27 May 2012; 20:15	Nørgaard 9	(9–9)	three players 4	Gigantium, Aalborg; Attendance: 3,000; Referees: Nachevski G, Nikolov S (MKD)
27 May 2012; 20:15	4× (yellow card) 5× (suspension)	Report	3× (yellow card) 2× (suspension)	Gigantium, Aalborg; Attendance: 3,000; Referees: Nachevski G, Nikolov S (MKD)
