= Handball at the 2012 Summer Olympics (disambiguation) =

Articles on Handball at the 2012 Summer Olympics include:

- Handball at the 2012 Summer Olympics
- Handball at the 2012 Summer Olympics – Men's qualification
- Handball at the 2012 Summer Olympics – Men's tournament
- Handball at the 2012 Summer Olympics – Women's qualification
- Handball at the 2012 Summer Olympics – Women's tournament
