= Shadi =

Shadi may refer to:

== People ==
- Shadi (name)

== Places ==
- Juy-ye Shadi, village in Bamyan Province, Afghanistan
- Shadi Township (沙堤乡), Yongding District, Zhangjiajie, Hunan, China
- Shadi, Jiangxi (沙地镇), town in Gan County, Jiangxi, China
- Shadi, Iran, village in Taybad County, Razavi Khorasan Province, Iran
- Chak Shadi, village of Jhelum District in Punjab, Pakistan
- Foshan Shadi Airport, an airport in Foshan, Guangdong, China
- Shadi (沙堤渔港), fishing port of Shangchuan Island in Guangdong, China

== Entertainment ==
- Shadi, a character in the anime and manga series Yu-Gi-Oh!
- "Shadi" (Shady, Chadi), a song from the repertoire of Fairuz

== See also ==
- Saadi (disambiguation)
- Shaadi (disambiguation)
