= Saad (name) =

- Pronunciation: Arabic: [saʕd] Egyptian Arabic: [sæʕd]
- Gender: Male
- Language: Arabic

Origin
- Meaning: "happiness", "luck", "prosperity", "successful"
- Region of origin: Arabia

Other names
- Alternative spelling: Sa'd, Sad

Saad (Arabic: سعد, romanized: Saʿd) is a common male Arabic given name. The name stems from the Arabic verb sa‘ada (سَعَدَ 'to be happy, fortunate or lucky').

Saad is the stem of variant given names Suad and Sa‘id.

It may be a shortened version of Sa'd al-Din, and is not to be confused with it. It is not the same as the single Arabic letter ṣād, which has no intrinsic meaning.

It may refer to:

== Tribal name ==
- Banu Sa'd, a Saudi tribe
- Al Bu Sa’ad, a Hashemite Jifrid tribe in Yemen & parts of Somalia

== First name ==
- Saad Albazei, Saudi Arabian intellectual
- Saad Shaddad Al-Asmari, Saudi Arabian runner
- Saad Awad, American mixed martial artist of Palestinian descent
- Saad Benyamin, Iraqi international football (soccer) player
- Saad El-Hawli, Australian rules footballer
- Saad Eskander, Iraqi-Kurdish academic and researcher
- Saad Kamil Al-Fadhli, Kuwaiti football referee
- Sa'ad Al-Faqih, Saudi dissident
- Saad Haddad, Lebanese military personnel
- Saad Hafeez, Danish cricketer
- Saad Hariri, Lebanese politician, former Prime Minister of Lebanon
- Saad Haroon, Pakistani comedian
- Saad Al-Harthi, Saudi Arabian footballer
- Saad Hamdan, Lebanese actor and voice actor
- Saad Hayel Srour, Jordanian politician
- Saad Hinti (born 2002), Moroccan hurdler
- Saad Ichalalène, Algerian football (soccer) player
- Saad Janjua, Singaporean-Pakistani cricketer
- Saad Khader, Saudi Arabian television actor, director and producer
- Sa'ad Khair, Jordanian Intelligence and security official
- Saad Khan, Indian film director, screenwriter and acting teacher
- Saad Lamjarred, Moroccan pop singer-songwriter, actor and record producer
- Saad Mamoun, Egyptian military commander
- Saad Madhi Saad Howash Al Azmi, Kuwaiti detainee in Guantanamo
- Saad Mohseni, Afghani-Australian businessman
- Saʿd ibn Muaʿdh, an Arabian tribal leader and an early convert to Islam
- Saad Al-Abdullah Al-Salim Al-Sabah, former Emir of Kuwait
- Saad Salman, Iraqi-French film director
- Sa'ad bin Abdul Rahman Al Saud, Saudi royal
- Saad bin Abdulaziz Al Saud, Saudi royal
- Saad bin Faisal Al Saud, Saudi royal
- Saad bin Saud Al Saud, Saudi royal
- Saad Al-Shammari, Qatari footballer
- Saad el-Shazly, Egyptian military personality
- Saad Tedjar, Algerian football (soccer) player
- Saad Bin Tefla, Kuwaiti businessman and politician
- Sa'd ibn Ubadah, an Arabian tribal leader and an early convert to Islam
- Sa`d ibn Abi Waqqas, a companion of Muhammad
- Saad Bin Zafar, Pakistan-Canadian cricket player
- Saad Zaghloul, Egyptian Prime Minister and anti-imperialist leader

== Middle name ==
- Mohammad Ibn Sa'd al-Baghdadi, aka Ibn Sa'd, often called Katib ul-Waqidi, the scribe of Waqidi
- Yusuf Saad Kamel, a Kenyan-born Bahraini professional athlete (runner)
- Abdul Aziz Sa'ad Al-Khaldi, Saudi Arabian detainee in Guantanamo
- Bilal Saad Mubarak, Qatari sportsman (shot putter)
- Khalid Saad Mohammed, Saudi Arabian detainee in Guantanamo
- Matthew Saad Muhammad (born Maxwell Antonio Loach), American former boxer
- Salman Saad Al Khadi Mohammed, Saudi Arabian detainee in Guantanamo
- Ahmed Saad Osman, Libyan football player
- Khawaja Saad Rafique, Pakistani politician

== Family name ==
- Abbas Saad, Australian former international football (soccer) player of Lebanese origin
- Abdulrahman Mohamed Saad, Qatari basketball player
- Adam Saad, Australian rules footballer
- Ahmed Saad, Australian rules football player of Egyptian descent
- Antoine Saad (1937–2025), Lebanese politician
- Baba Saad, or just Saad, a German rapper of Lebanese origin
- Brandon Saad, American ice hockey player of Syrian origin
- Emir Saad, real name Alan Digorsky, Ossetian Islamist militant and the first leader of the Ossetian Jamaat Kataib al-Khoul
- Emmanuel Saad, Egyptian Coptic composer, music arranger
- Fatima Saad (1966–2025), Syrian actress
- Felipe Saad, Brazilian football (soccer) player
- Gad Saad, Lebanese-born Jewish-Canadian behavioural scientist and university professor
- Ghanim Bin Saad Al Saad, Qatari businessman
- Habib Pacha Es-Saad, Lebanese politician and former Prime Minister
- Halim Saad, a Malaysian businessman
- Hasballah M. Saad, Indonesian politician
- Henry Saad, American Michigan-based judge
- John Saad, Sierra Leonean politician of Lebanese descent
- Khaled Saad, Jordanian football (soccer) player
- Mahmoud Saad (footballer, born 1952), Egyptian football (soccer) player
- Mahmoud Saad (footballer, born 1983), Egyptian football (soccer) player
- Malik Saad, Pakistani senior police officer, engineer
- Margit Saad, German film and television actress
- Matías Saad, Argentine professional football (soccer) player
- Mohamed Saad (disambiguation)
- Naeem Saad, Kuwaiti football (soccer) player
- Natasja Saad, late Danish rapper
- Nicolás Saad, Argentinean film director
- Osama Saad (born 1954), Lebanese politician
- Ra'ad Sa'ad (1972–2025), Hamas senior commander
- Razali Saad, Singaporean football (soccer) player
- Roberto Saad, former Argentinean professional tennis player
- Rola Saad, Lebanese pop singer and model
- Rola Saad (entertainer), Lebanese pan-Arab television personality, producing well-known television shows including the Arab version of Star Academy
- Salem Saad, Emirati football (soccer) player
- Shahrizal Saad, Malaysian football (soccer) player
- Siti binti Saad, Tanzanian taraab artist
- Soony Saad, Lebanese-American soccer player
- Stephen Saad (born 1964), South African businessman
- Syamsul Saad, Malaysian football (soccer) player
- Waseelah Saad, Yemeni track and field sprint athlete
- Yousef Saad, American computer scientist of Algerian origin

== See also ==
- Saad (disambiguation)
- Saado
- Saadallah, disambiguation
- Sa'd al-Din / Saad Eddin (disambiguation)
