= Rafika Marzouk =

Tunisian handball player (born 1979)

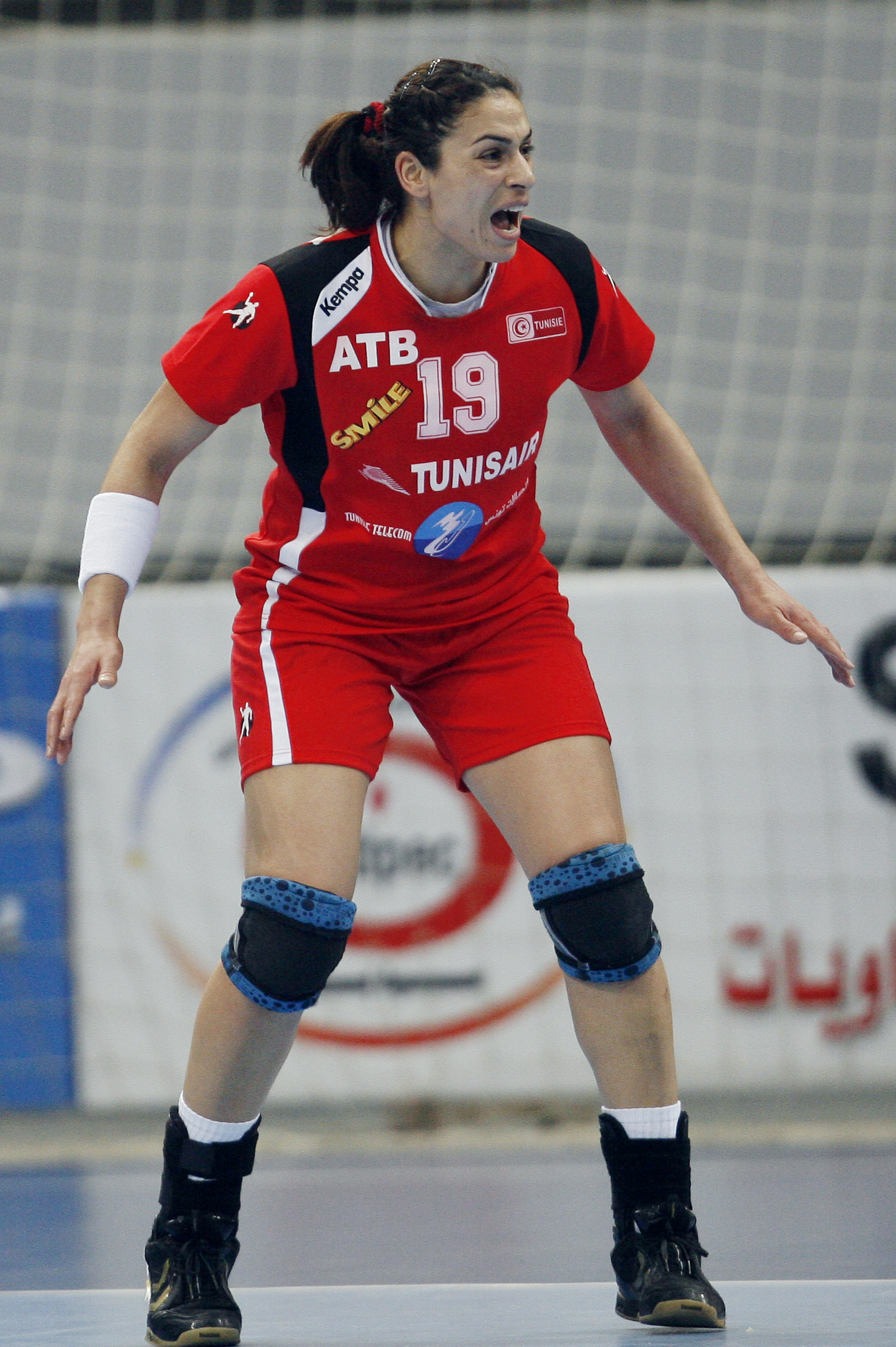

Personal information
- Nationality: Tunisian
- Born: 27 October 1979 (age 46) Sousse, Tunisia
- Height: 1.73 m (5 ft 8 in)

Sport
- Sport: Handball
- Position: Right wing
- Current club: Nantes Loire Atlantique Handball
- Number: 19
National team
- Years: Team
- –: Tunisia

Rafika Marzouk (رفيقة مرزوق), born 27 October 1979 in Sousse, is a Tunisian handball player. She plays as captain at right wing for Nantes Loire Atlantique Handball in the top division of the French league Championnat de France de handball féminin and in the Tunisian national team.

Marzouk played for Tunisia in the African Women's Handball Championships in 2010 and 2012 in which the team was runner-up, and in 2014 in which it won the tournament.

She also played for Tunisia at the World Women's Handball Championship in 2011 in Brazil.

== Play history ==
Marzouk's play history:

| Competitions | Clubs (France) | Goals |
|---|---|---|
| CHALLENGE CUP 2011-12 | Fleury Loiret Handball | 18 |
| EHF CUP 2009-10 | Havre HAC | 36 |
| CUP WINNERS' CUP 2008-09 | Havre HAC | 9 |
| CUP WINNERS' CUP 2007-08 | Havre HAC | 13 |
| CHALLENGE CUP 2006-07 | Cercle Dijon Bourgogne | 11 |
| CHALLENGE CUP 2005-06 | Cercle Dijon Bourgogne | - |
| CUP WINNERS' CUP 2003-04 | Handball Cercle Nimes | - |
| EHF CUP 2001-02 | SUN A.L. Bouillargues | - |
