= Saad =

Saad or Sa'ad may refer to:

- Saad (letter), a letter in the Arabic script
- Saad (name), people carrying the name or surname
- Sa'ad, a kibbutz in the Negev desert in Israel
- Saad Esporte Clube, a Brazilian football club
- Saad SC, an Iraqi football club
- Saad Specialist Hospital, in Khobar, Saudi Arabia
- Saad National Schools, in Khobar, Saudi Arabia
- Kolej Yayasan Saad, formerly Saad Foundation College, a school in Malaysia
- PNS Saad, a Pakistan Navy submarine

== See also ==
- Sad (disambiguation)
- Saadi (disambiguation)
- Sa'd al-Din (disambiguation), including variants such as Saadeddine
- Saadallah, a given name and family name
- Banu Sa'ad, one of the tribes of Arabia during Muhammad's era
- System Administrator Appreciation Day
