= Jocelyne Mavoungou =

Congolese handball player

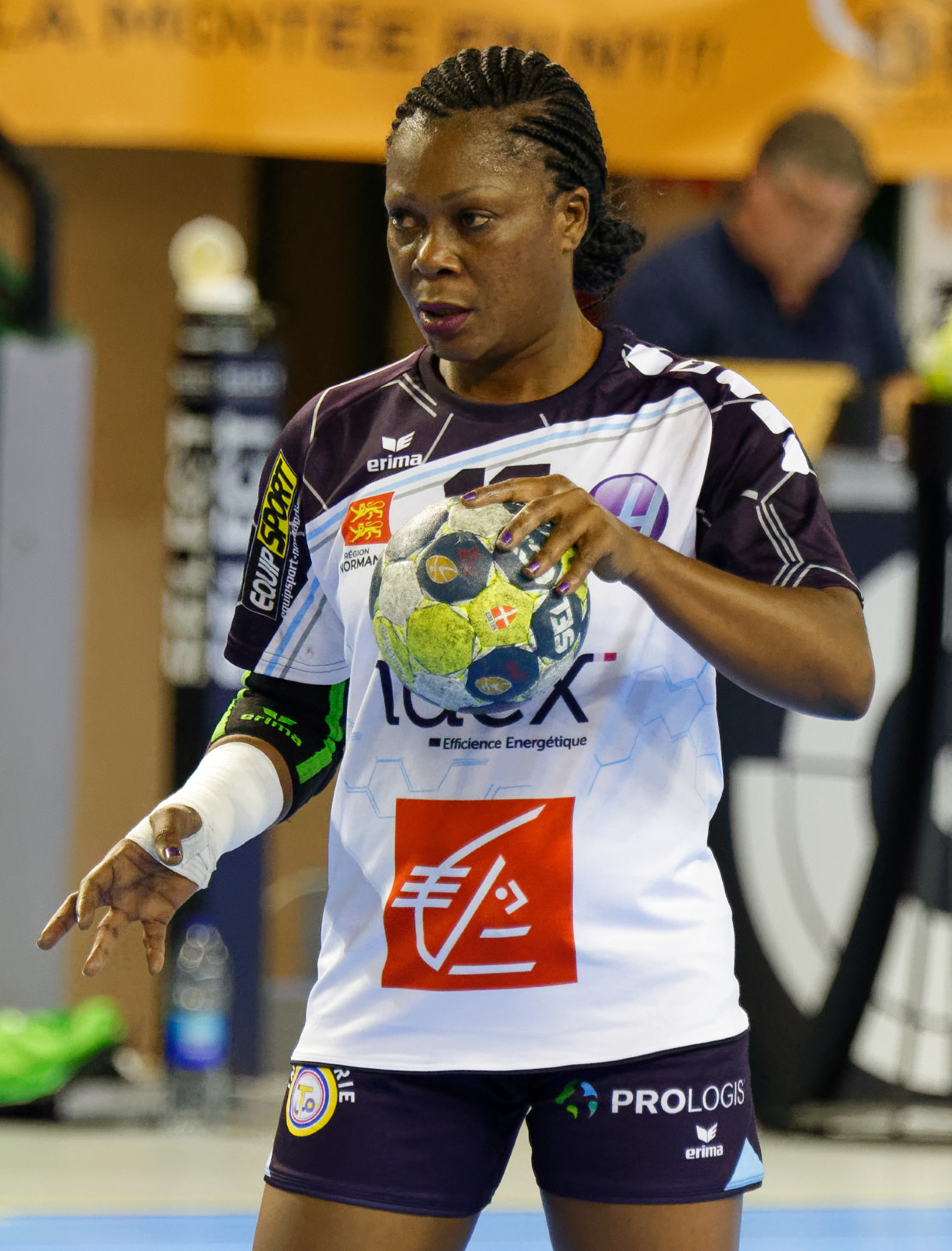
- Jocelyne Mavoungou in 2017

Personal information
- Full name: Jocelyne Edrige Mavoungou-Tsahout
- Nationality: Congolese
- Born: 22 September 1986 (age 40)
- Height: 165 cm (65 in)

Sport
- Sport: Handball
- Position: right wing
- Current club: Le Havre AC
- Number: 18

Senior clubs
- Years: Team
- 2008-14: Cercle Dijon Bourgogne
- 2014-15: Cergy-Pontoise
- 2017-present: Le Havre AC
National team
- Years: Team
- –: Republic of the Congo

Jocelyne Edrige Mavoungou-Tsahout also simply known as Jocelyne Mavoungou (born 22 September 1986) is a Congolese female handball player who plays as a winger for Congo national team. She currently plays for the Le Havre AC handball team in the French Women's Handball Championship.

== Career ==
Jocelyne Mavoungou made her maiden club appearance for the French handball team, Cercle Dijon Bourgogne in 2008 and represented the side until 2014 in the French Women's Handball Championship. She had a short stint with Cergy-Pontoise from 2014-2015.

She represented Congo at the 2014 African Women's Handball Championship and was part of the squad which finished fifth in the tournament out of 8 teams. Jocelyne was also the member of the national team which secured fourth position at the 2016 African Women's Handball Championship.
