= Shaadi =

Shaadi may refer to:

- A Shaadi is the generic term for an Indian or Pakistani wedding
- Shaadi.com, an Indian matrimonial website
- Shaadi (1962 film), a 1962 Indian film
- Shaadi (1941 film), a 1941 Bollywood film
- Shaadi (horse)

== See also ==
- Shadi (disambiguation)
