= Sadettin =

Sadettin is the Turkish version of the Muslim name Sa'd al-Din. It may refer to:

- Sadettin Ergeç, Iraqi Turkmen politician
- Sadettin Heper (1899–1980), Turkish composer
- Sadettin Kaynak (1895–1961), Turkish composer
- Sadettin Saran, American-Turkish businessman
