= Ngawa Hongyuan Airport =

Ngawa Hongyuan Airport 阿坝红原机场
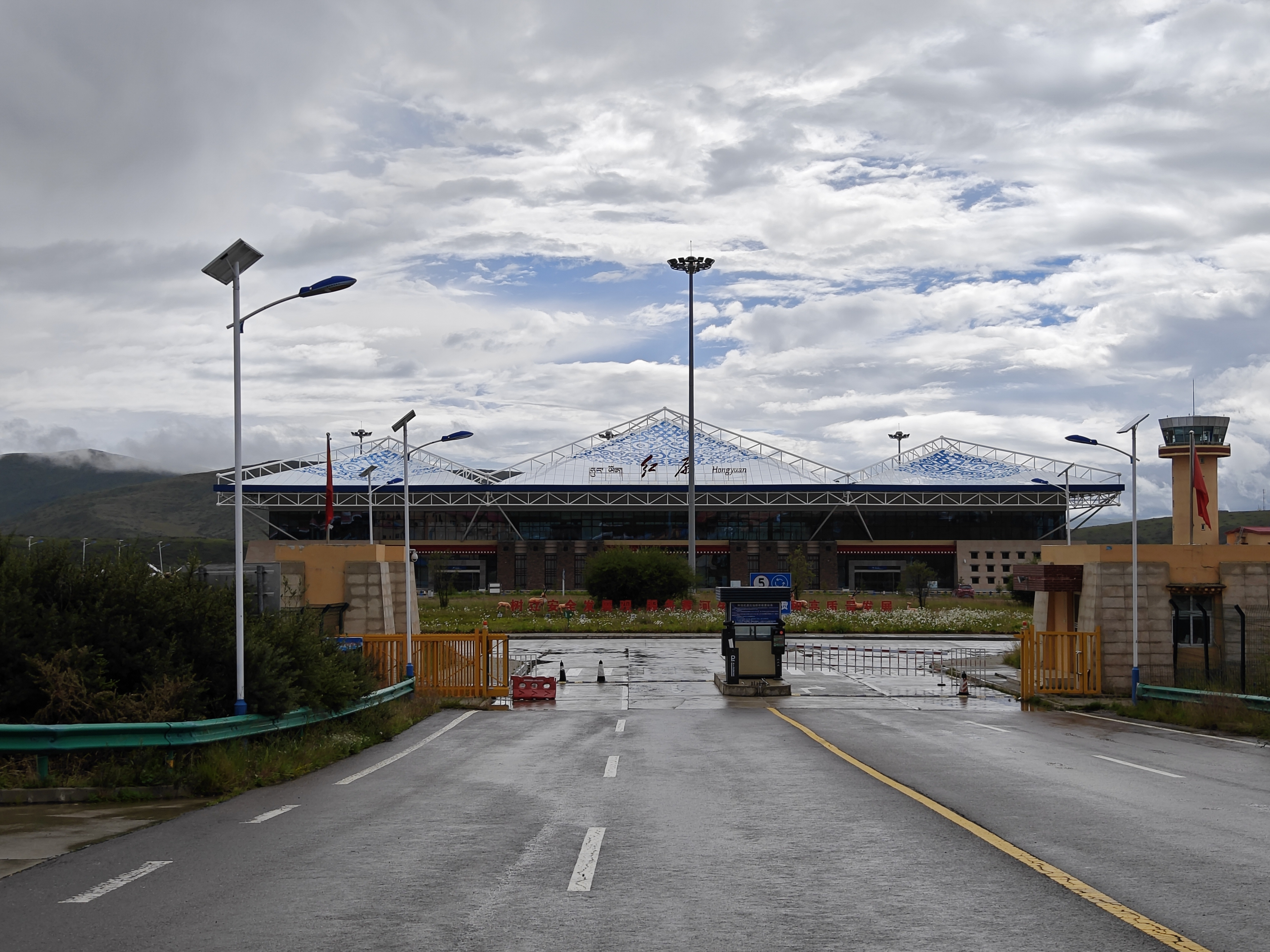
- IATA: AHJ; ICAO: ZUHY

Summary
- Airport type: Public
- Serves: Hongyuan County, Sichuan
- Opened: 28 August 2014; 11 years ago
- Elevation AMSL: 3,535 m / 11,598 ft
- Coordinates: 32°31′45″N 102°21′25″E

Map
- Location of airport in Sichuan

Runways
Direction	Length		Surface
Direction	m	ft	Surface
16/34	3,600	11,811

Statistics (2021)
- Passengers: 22,748
- Aircraft movements: 566

Ngawa Hongyuan Airport
- Simplified Chinese: 阿坝红原机场
- Traditional Chinese: 阿壩紅原機場
Transcriptions
Standard Mandarin
- Hanyu Pinyin: Ābà Hóngyuán Jīchǎng

Aba Hongyuan Airport (IATA: AHJ, ICAO: ZUHY) is an airport serving Hongyuan County in Ngawa Tibetan and Qiang Autonomous Prefecture of Sichuan province, China. It is located 48 kilometres (30 mi) southwest of the county seat, and 128 kilometres (80 mi) from Barkam, the prefecture capital. Construction started in July 2012, and the airport was opened on 28 August 2014. Hongyuan is a high-altitude airport, situated 3,535 metres (11,598 ft) above sea level.

== Facilities ==
The airport has a 3,600-meter runway (class 4C) and a 3,600-square-meter terminal building. It is projected to handle 350,000 passengers annually by 2020.

== Airlines and destinations ==
Airlines	Destinations
Air China	Chengdu–Tianfu, Lhasa
Tibet Airlines	Chengdu–Shuangliu, Wenzhou

== See also ==
- List of airports in China
- List of the busiest airports in China
- List of highest airports
