= Hongyuan County =

Hongyuan County 红原县 • སྐ་ཁོག་རྫོང་། Gakog, Gaqu, Hungyoin
- County
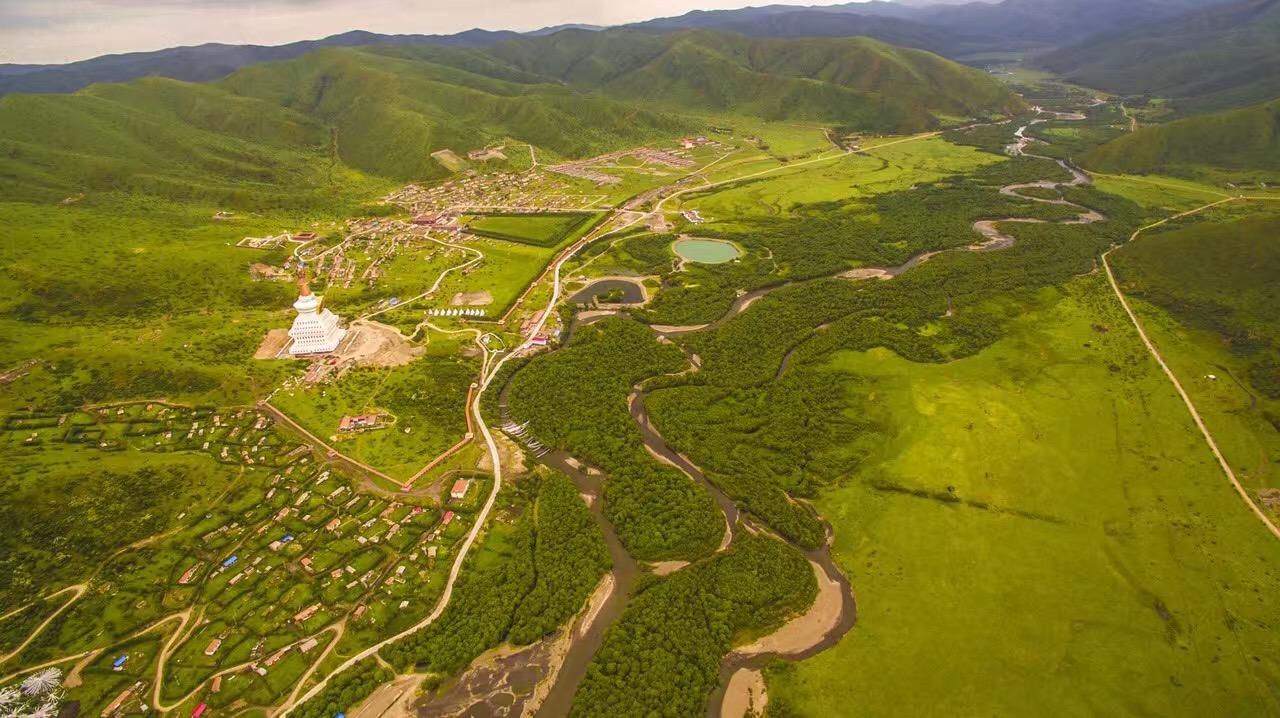
- Aerial view over Mewa Monastery

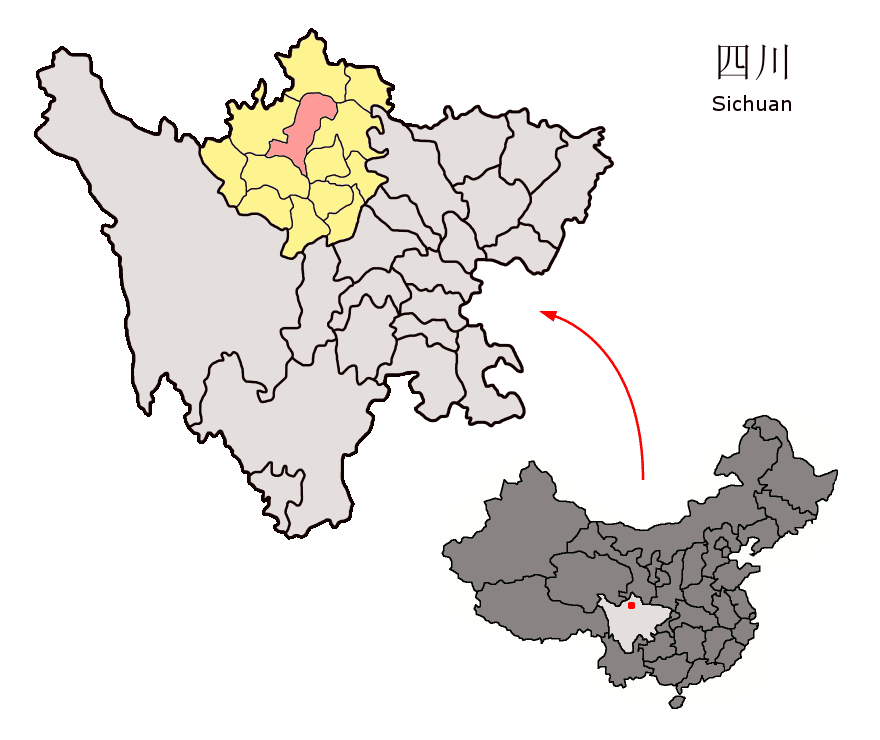
- Location of Hongyuan County (red) in Ngawa Prefecture (yellow) and Sichuan

- Location in Sichuan Hongyuan (China)
- Coordinates: 32°52′35″N 102°32′24″E
- Country: China
- Province: Sichuan
- Autonomous prefecture: Ngawa
- County seat: Kyungqu

Area
  - Total: 8,398 km^{2} (3,242 sq mi)

Population (2020)
  - Total: 46,644
  - Density: 5.554/km^{2} (14.39/sq mi)
- Time zone: UTC+8 (China Standard)
- Website: www.hongyuan.gov.cn

Hongyuan County

Chinese name
- Simplified Chinese: 红原县
- Traditional Chinese: 紅原縣
Transcriptions
Standard Mandarin
- Hanyu Pinyin: Hóngyuán Xiàn
Yue: Cantonese
- Jyutping: hung^{4}jyun^{4} jyun^{2}

Tibetan name
- Tibetan: རྐ་ཁོག་རྫོང་། སྐ་ཆུ་རྫོང་། ཧུང་ཡོན་རྫོང་།
Transcriptions
- Wylie: rka khog rdzong or rka chu rdzong or hung yon rdzong
- Tibetan Pinyin: Gakog Zong or Gaqu Zong or Hungyoin Zong

Gakog (Hongyuan) County (Tibetan: སྐ་ཆུ་རྫོང་། or སྐ་ཁོག་རྫོང་།; Chinese: 红原县) is a county in the north of Sichuan Province, China. It is under the administration of the Ngawa Tibetan and Qiang Autonomous Prefecture. There is a river called Ka Chu/Gaqu (སྐ་ཆུ།) in the area and kog means "valley" or "area"; thus it means the area of the Ga River.

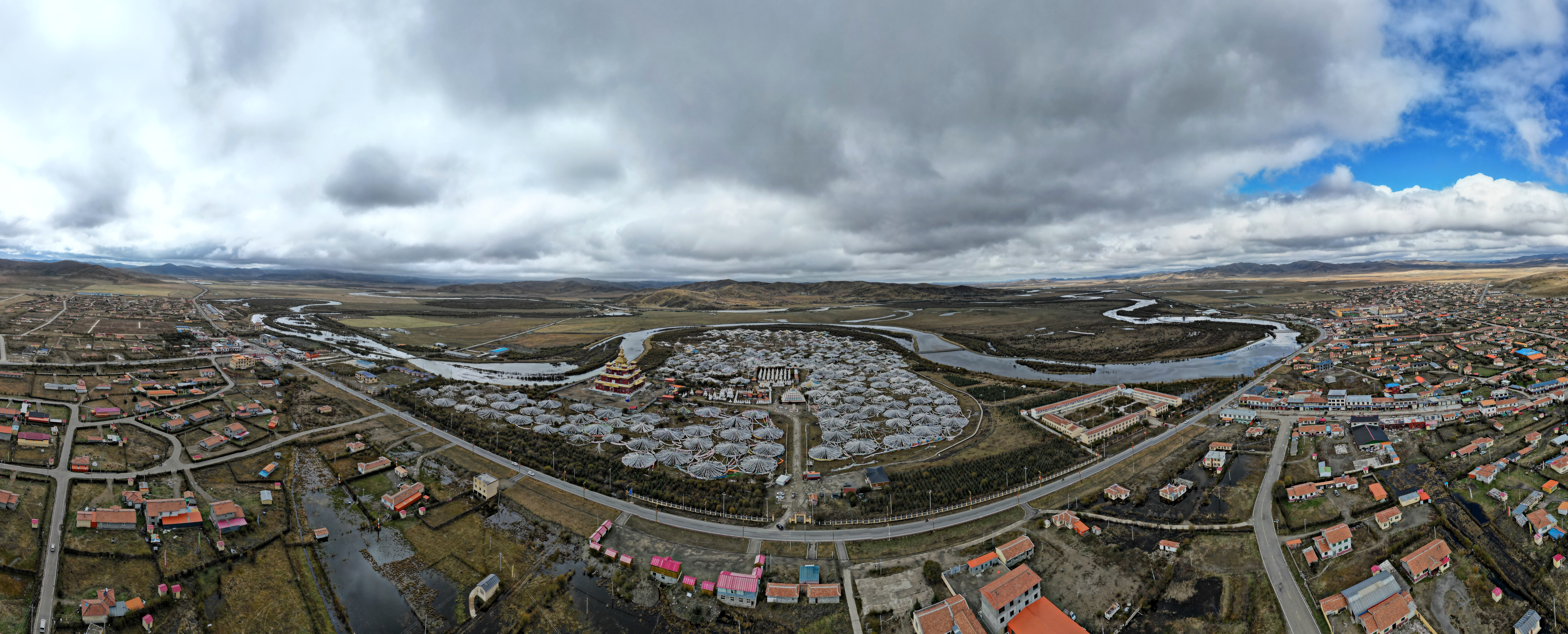
Aerial panorama of Waqie Talin 瓦切塔林 in Hongyuan county.

This is the only county under the Prefecture with entirely yak herding pastoralists. The average altitude above the sea level is 3,600 m (11,800 ft). About 8,398 square meter and about 40,000 people reside (2004) mostly Amdo Tibetan. The language is spoken is one of the most conservative dialect among the Amdo Tibetan varieties. The county seat is Kyungqu (a.k.a. Khyungchu).

Southwest University for Nationalities maintains the Qinghai-Tibetan Plateau Ecological Environmental Protection and Advanced Technology for Animal Husbandry in Hongyuan County.

The country is served by Aba Hongyuan Airport.

== Governance ==
=== Hongyuan County Public Security Bureau ===
The Hongyuan County Public Security Bureau (Chinese: 红原县公安局) is the primary law enforcement agency in Hongyuan county. It operates 10 police stations and 1 Jail along with a traffic police unit, a forestry unit and a plains unit. As of 2016, the forestry unit had 16 officers.

==== Line of duty-deaths ====
On 15 March 2020, an officer of the forestry unit died due to duty-related illness.

=== Hongyuan County Fire and Rescue Battalion ===
The Hongyuan County Fire and Rescue Battalion (Chinese: 红原县消防救援大队) provides firefighting and rescue services within the county.

== Climate ==
Hongyuan has a subarctic climate (Köppen Dwc) with short, mild summers and cold winters, although not as cold as subarctic climates at higher latitudes. It is affected by the Asian Monsoon.

Climate data for Hongyuan, elevation 3,492 m (11,457 ft), (1991–2020 normals, extremes 1981–2010)
Month	Jan	Feb	Mar	Apr	May	Jun	Jul	Aug	Sep	Oct	Nov	Dec	Year
Record high °C (°F)	15.4 (59.7)	16.6 (61.9)	19.6 (67.3)	23.0 (73.4)	24.6 (76.3)	26.0 (78.8)	25.7 (78.3)	25.6 (78.1)	24.9 (76.8)	23.1 (73.6)	15.4 (59.7)	14.4 (57.9)	26.0 (78.8)
Mean daily maximum °C (°F)	2.7 (36.9)	4.7 (40.5)	7.2 (45.0)	10.9 (51.6)	13.8 (56.8)	16.0 (60.8)	18.4 (65.1)	18.2 (64.8)	15.5 (59.9)	10.9 (51.6)	7.0 (44.6)	3.7 (38.7)	10.8 (51.4)
Daily mean °C (°F)	−8.8 (16.2)	−5.6 (21.9)	−1.3 (29.7)	2.8 (37.0)	6.4 (43.5)	9.7 (49.5)	11.5 (52.7)	10.8 (51.4)	7.9 (46.2)	3.0 (37.4)	−2.7 (27.1)	−7.6 (18.3)	2.2 (35.9)
Mean daily minimum °C (°F)	−18.5 (−1.3)	−14.3 (6.3)	−7.7 (18.1)	−3.5 (25.7)	0.4 (32.7)	4.6 (40.3)	5.8 (42.4)	4.8 (40.6)	2.5 (36.5)	−2.1 (28.2)	−9.5 (14.9)	−16.2 (2.8)	−4.5 (23.9)
Record low °C (°F)	−36.0 (−32.8)	−30.2 (−22.4)	−26.3 (−15.3)	−14.9 (5.2)	−14.8 (5.4)	−4.4 (24.1)	−2.6 (27.3)	−4.9 (23.2)	−6.7 (19.9)	−15.3 (4.5)	−26.6 (−15.9)	−30.7 (−23.3)	−36.0 (−32.8)
Average precipitation mm (inches)	7.3 (0.29)	11.0 (0.43)	26.5 (1.04)	50.3 (1.98)	107.6 (4.24)	131.0 (5.16)	122.1 (4.81)	109.3 (4.30)	111.6 (4.39)	70.8 (2.79)	11.7 (0.46)	3.9 (0.15)	763.1 (30.04)
Average precipitation days (≥ 0.1 mm)	5.9	8.0	12.6	15.9	21.2	21.3	18.8	17.2	19.5	17.9	6.8	4.1	169.2
Average snowy days	8.1	10.6	16.8	16.0	8.6	1.6	0.2	0.4	2.3	13.9	9.0	5.7	93.2
Average relative humidity (%)	58	59	65	68	72	75	76	77	79	77	66	59	69
Mean monthly sunshine hours	215.4	186.6	199.0	203.1	196.1	165.5	201.5	206.6	168.9	171.4	210.9	225.7	2,350.7
Percentage possible sunshine	68	60	53	52	46	39	47	51	46	49	68	73	54
Source: China Meteorological Administration

== Administrative divisions ==
Hongyuan County has 6 townships and 4 townships:

Name	Simplified Chinese	Hanyu Pinyin	Tibetan	Wylie	Administrative division code
Towns
Kyungqu town (Khyungchu, Qiongxi)	邛溪镇	Qióngxī Zhèn	ཁྱུང་མཆུ་གྲོང་རྡལ།	khyung mchu grong rdal	513233100
Da'gyailing town (Sajinse, Shuajingsi)	刷经寺镇	Shuājīngsì Zhèn	ལྟ་རྒྱལ་གླིང་གྲོང་རྡལ།	lta rgyal gling grong rdal	513233101
Waqên town (Waqie)	瓦切镇	Wǎqiē Zhèn	སྦྲ་ཆེན་གྲོང་རྡལ།	sbra chen grong rdal	513233102
Amqog town (Anqog, Anqu)	安曲镇	Ānqǔ Zhèn	ཨ་མཆོག་གྲོང་རྡལ།	a mchog grong rdal	513233103
Sêrdêu Town (Sêrdiu, Sedi)	色地镇	Sèdì Zhèn	གསེར་རྡེའུ་གྲོང་རྡལ།	gser rde'u grong rdal	513233104
Lungsi town (Longriba, Longri)	龙日镇	Lòngrì Zhèn	ལུང་ཟི་གྲོང་རྡལ།	lung zi grong rdal	513233105
Townships
Gyarong Township (Jiangrong)	江茸乡	Jiāngróng Xiāng	སྐྱ་རོང་ཡུལ་ཚོ།	skya rong yul tsho	513233202
Carima Township (Cha'erma)	查尔玛乡	Chá'ěrmǎ Xiāng	ཚ་རི་མ་ཡུལ་ཚོ།	tsha ri ma yul tsho	513233203
Amoi Township (Amu)	阿木乡	Āmù Xiāng	ཨ་མོའི་ཡུལ་ཚོ།	a mo'i yul tsho	513233205
Mêwa Township (Maiwa)	麦洼乡	Màiwā Xiāng	རྨེ་བ་ཡུལ་ཚོ།	rme ba yul tsho	513233207

== National priority protected sites ==
There is 1 National priority protected site in Hongyuan County.

- Aba Long March Relics - added as part of the 6th Batch of National Priority Protected Sites
  - Yakouxia Mountain Red Army Martyrs Mausoleum
