= Saadallah =

Saadallah, also spelled Saadullah, Sa'dullah or Sadollah (Arabic: سعد الله) is a male given name meaning Joy of God. People with the name include:

== People with the given name ==
- Sadullah Ergin (born 1964), Turkish politician
- Sadullah Güney (1883–1945), Ottoman Army officer
- Saadallah Howayek (1853–1915), Lebanese politician
- Saadallah al-Jabiri (1891–1948), Syrian prime minister
- Sadullah Khan, South African writer and speaker on Islamic issues
- Saadallah Mazraani, Lebanese communist politician
- Saadallah Agha al-Qalaa (1950–2025), Syrian government minister
- Saadallah Wannous (1941–1997), Syrian playwright
- Saadallah Abu-El-Kacem (1927–2013), Algerian historian

== People with the surname ==
- Amir Sadollah (born 1980), American mixed martial artist
- Abdulla Saadalla, Tanzanian CCM politician and Member of Parliament

== See also ==
- Saad (disambiguation)
  - Saad, a given name and family name
- Sa'd al-Din (disambiguation)
