= Sadiyan =

Sadiyan may refer to:

- Sədiyan, Azerbaijan
- Sadian, Iran
- Sadiyaan, a 2010 Bollywood film

== See also ==
- Sadi (disambiguation)
- Sadiya, town in Assam, India
  - Sadiya (Vidhan Sabha constituency)
