= Guinea women's national handball team =

Guinea

Information
- Association: Guinean Handball Federation

Colours
| 1st | 2nd |

Results

African Championship
- Appearances: 6 (First in 2014)
- Best result: 7th (2016, 2018, 2021)
- Last updated on Unknown.

The Guinea women's national handball team is the national team of Guinea. It is governed by the Guinean Handball Federation and takes part in international handball competitions.

== African Championship record ==
- 2014 – 8th
- 2016 – 7th
- 2018 – 7th
- 2021 – 7th
- 2022 – 9th
- 2024 – 9th
- 2026 – Qualified
