= Guinean Handball Federation =

Governing body of handball in Guinea

Guinean Handball Federation French: Fédération Guinéenne de Handball FGHB
- IOC nation: Republic of Guinea (GUI)
- Sport: Handball
- Other sports: Beach handball
- Official website: www.feguihand.info

HISTORY
- Year of formation: 1972; 53 years ago

AFFILIATIONS
- International federation: International Handball Federation (IHF)
- IHF member since: 1972
- Continental association: African Handball Confederation
- National Olympic Committee: Guinean National Olympic and Sports Committee

GOVERNING BODY
- President: Mamadouba Paye Camara

HEADQUARTERS
- Address: Stade du 28 Septembre, Conakry, Commune de Dixinn, BP 2504
- Country: Guinea
- Secretary General: Mrs. Lt. Col. Ibrahima Camara

The Guinean Handball Federation (French: Fédération Guinéenne de Handball) (FGHB) is the administrative and controlling body for handball and beach handball in Republic of Guinea. Founded in 1972, FGHB is a member of African Handball Confederation (CAHB) and the International Handball Federation (IHF).

== National teams ==
- Guinea men's national handball team
- Guinea men's national junior handball team
- Guinea women's national handball team
