= 2012 African Women's Handball Championship =

2012 African Championship
Tournament details
- Host country: Morocco
- Venues: 3 (in 1 host city)
- Dates: 11–20 January
- Teams: 10 (from 1 confederation)

Final positions
- Champions: Angola (11th title)
- Runners-up: Tunisia
- Third place: DR Congo
- Fourth place: Algeria

Tournament statistics
- Matches played: 33
- Goals scored: 1,592 (48.24 per match)
- Top scorer: (Democratic Republic of the Congo) Christiane Mwasesa

Awards
- Best player: (Tunisia) Mouna Chebbah

The 2012 African Women's Handball Championship was the 20th edition of the African Women's Handball Championship, organized by the African Handball Confederation. It was the 20th edition of the tournament and was held in Salé, Morocco between 11 and 20 January 2012. The winner qualified for the 2012 Summer Olympics.

== Teams ==
Group A	Group B
Angola; Ivory Coast; Cameroon; DR Congo; Egypt	Tunisia; Algeria; Morocco; Congo; Senegal

== Preliminary round ==
The draw was held on 24 September 2011 at Casablanca, Morocco.

All times are local (UTC±0).

=== Group A ===
Team	Pld	W	D	L	GF	GA	GD	Pts
Angola	4	4	0	0	125	79	+46	8
DR Congo	4	1	2	1	92	115	−23	4
Cameroon	4	2	0	2	95	93	+2	4
Ivory Coast	4	1	1	2	98	95	+3	3
Egypt	4	0	1	3	86	114	−28	1

11 January 2012; 11:00	Ivory Coast	28–16	Egypt	Moulay Abdullah, Salé
11 January 2012; 11:00		(12–7)		Moulay Abdullah, Salé

11 January 2012; 15:00	Cameroon	24–26	DR Congo	Moulay Abdullah, Salé
11 January 2012; 15:00		(12–18)		Moulay Abdullah, Salé

12 January 2012; 11:00	Angola	25–23	Ivory Coast	Hall Fathallah El Bouazzaoui, Salé; Referees: Bonaventura, Bonaventura (FRA)
12 January 2012; 11:00	three players 5	(15–16)	Gondo Bredou 7	Hall Fathallah El Bouazzaoui, Salé; Referees: Bonaventura, Bonaventura (FRA)

12 January 2012; 19:00	Egypt	24–27	Cameroon	Moulay Abdullah, Salé
12 January 2012; 19:00		(14–12)		Moulay Abdullah, Salé

13 January 2012; 11:00	DR Congo	23–23	Egypt	Hall Fathallah El Bouazzaoui, Salé
13 January 2012; 11:00		(11–12)		Hall Fathallah El Bouazzaoui, Salé

13 January 2012; 17:00	Cameroon	18–24	Angola	Moulay Abdullah, Salé; Referees: Abid, Chaouch (TUN)
13 January 2012; 17:00	Megouem Lah 5	(9–14)	three players 5	Moulay Abdullah, Salé; Referees: Abid, Chaouch (TUN)

15 January 2012; 17:00	Angola	40–15	DR Congo	Moulay Abdullah, Salé; Referees: Makhlouf, Krichene (TUN)
15 January 2012; 17:00	Carolina 7	(15–9)	Mwasesa 8	Moulay Abdullah, Salé; Referees: Makhlouf, Krichene (TUN)

15 January 2012; 19:00	Ivory Coast	19–26	Cameroon	Hall Fathallah El Bouazzaoui, Salé
15 January 2012; 19:00		(5–14)		Hall Fathallah El Bouazzaoui, Salé

16 January 2012; 11:00	DR Congo	28–28	Ivory Coast	Moulay Abdullah, Salé
16 January 2012; 11:00		(18–15)		Moulay Abdullah, Salé

16 January 2012; 13:00	Egypt	23–36	Angola	Hall Fathallah El Bouazzaoui, Salé; Referees: Abid, Chaouch (TUN)
16 January 2012; 13:00	Ehsan 7	(12–19)	Luísa 6	Hall Fathallah El Bouazzaoui, Salé; Referees: Abid, Chaouch (TUN)

=== Group B ===
Team	Pld	W	D	L	GF	GA	GD	Pts
Tunisia	4	4	0	0	123	78	+45	8
Algeria	4	3	0	1	97	74	+23	6
Congo	4	2	0	2	104	88	+16	4
Senegal	4	1	0	3	95	100	−5	2
Morocco (H)	4	0	0	4	46	126	−80	0

(H) Hosts

All times are local (UTC±0).

11 January 2012; 13:00	Tunisia	30–18	Algeria	Hall Fathallah El Bouazzaoui, Salé
11 January 2012; 13:00	Chebbah, Elghaoui 8	(15–8)		Hall Fathallah El Bouazzaoui, Salé

11 January 2012; 17:00	Senegal	25–15	Morocco	Hall Fathallah El Bouazzaoui, Salé
11 January 2012; 17:00		(14–9)		Hall Fathallah El Bouazzaoui, Salé

12 January 2012; 11:00	Algeria	25–17	Senegal	Hall Fathallah El Bouazzaoui, Salé
12 January 2012; 11:00		(12–9)		Hall Fathallah El Bouazzaoui, Salé

12 January 2012; 17:00	Morocco	16–34	Congo	Hall Fathallah El Bouazzaoui, Salé
12 January 2012; 17:00		(7–18)		Hall Fathallah El Bouazzaoui, Salé

13 January 2012; 13:00	Congo	28–23	Senegal	Hall Fathallah El Bouazzaoui, Salé
13 January 2012; 13:00		(17–11)		Hall Fathallah El Bouazzaoui, Salé

13 January 2012; 19:00	Morocco	8–35	Tunisia	Hall Fathallah El Bouazzaoui, Salé
13 January 2012; 19:00		(5–17)		Hall Fathallah El Bouazzaoui, Salé

15 January 2012; 13:00	Tunisia	26–22	Congo	Salle Ibn Yassine, Salé
15 January 2012; 13:00	Elghaoui 6	(14–9)		Salle Ibn Yassine, Salé

15 January 2012; 15:00	Algeria	31–7	Morocco	Hall Fathallah El Bouazzaoui, Salé
15 January 2012; 15:00		(16–4)		Hall Fathallah El Bouazzaoui, Salé

16 January 2012; 13:00	Congo	20–23	Algeria	Salle Ibn Yassine, Salé
16 January 2012; 13:00		(10–13)		Salle Ibn Yassine, Salé

16 January 2012; 17:00	Senegal	30–32	Tunisia	Hall Fathallah El Bouazzaoui, Salé
16 January 2012; 17:00		(15–16)		Hall Fathallah El Bouazzaoui, Salé

== Knockout stage ==
=== Bracket ===
Quarter-finals
18 January
Angola	41
Senegal	20
18 January
Congo	19
DR Congo	29
18 January
Algeria	23
Cameroon	22
18 January
Ivory Coast	19
Tunisia	24

Semi-finals
19 January
Angola	39
DR Congo	19
19 January
Algeria	24
Tunisia	27

Final
20 January
Angola	26
Tunisia	24
Third place
20 January
DR Congo	33
Algeria	24

5–8th bracket

Semifinals
19 January
Cameroon	19
Ivory Coast	18
19 January
Senegal	22
Congo	25

Fifth place
20 January
Cameroon	22
Congo	19
Seventh place
20 January
Ivory Coast	28
Senegal	21

All times are local (UTC±0).

=== Quarterfinals ===
18 January 2012; 12:00	Congo	19–29	DR Congo	Salle Ibn Yassine, Salé
18 January 2012; 12:00		(10–10)		Salle Ibn Yassine, Salé

18 January 2012; 14:30	Angola	41–20	Senegal	Salle Ibn Yassine, Salé; Referees: Abdelaziz, Rashed (EGY)
18 January 2012; 14:30	Azenaide 9	(19–10)	Cissé 7	Salle Ibn Yassine, Salé; Referees: Abdelaziz, Rashed (EGY)

18 January 2012; 17:00	Algeria	23–22	Cameroon	Salle Ibn Yassine, Salé
18 January 2012; 17:00	Titou 10	(11–10)		Salle Ibn Yassine, Salé

18 January 2012; 20:00	Ivory Coast	19–24	Tunisia	Salle Ibn Yassine, Salé; Referees: Bonaventura, Bonaventura (FRA)
18 January 2012; 20:00		(7–11)	Toumi 7	Salle Ibn Yassine, Salé; Referees: Bonaventura, Bonaventura (FRA)

=== 5–8th semifinals ===
19 January 2012; 11:00	Cameroon	19–18	Ivory Coast	Hall Fathallah El Bouazzaoui, Salé
19 January 2012; 11:00		(11–11)		Hall Fathallah El Bouazzaoui, Salé

19 January 2012; 15:00	Senegal	22–25	Congo	Hall Fathallah El Bouazzaoui, Salé
19 January 2012; 15:00		(10–13)		Hall Fathallah El Bouazzaoui, Salé

=== Semifinals ===
19 January 2012; 12:00	Angola	39–19	DR Congo	Salle Ibn Yassine, Salé; Referees: Echennaoui, Nasse (MAR)
19 January 2012; 12:00	Natália 6	(23–9)	Mwasesa 6	Salle Ibn Yassine, Salé; Referees: Echennaoui, Nasse (MAR)

19 January 2012; 14:30	Algeria	24–27	Tunisia	Salle Ibn Yassine, Salé
19 January 2012; 14:30	Titou 8	(10–10)	Elghaoui 7	Salle Ibn Yassine, Salé

=== Ninth place game ===
17 January 2012; 15:00	Egypt	32–12	Morocco	Salle Ibn Yassine, Salé
17 January 2012; 15:00		(15–8)		Salle Ibn Yassine, Salé

=== Seventh place game ===
20 January 2012; 11:00	Ivory Coast	28–21	Senegal	Hall Fathallah El Bouazzaoui, Salé
20 January 2012; 11:00		(14–8)		Hall Fathallah El Bouazzaoui, Salé

=== Fifth place game ===
20 January 2012; 13:00	Cameroon	22–19	Congo	Hall Fathallah El Bouazzaoui, Salé
20 January 2012; 13:00		(11–8)		Hall Fathallah El Bouazzaoui, Salé

=== Bronze medal game ===
20 January 2012; 11:00	DR Congo	33–24	Algeria	Salle Ibn Yassine, Salé; Referees: Abdelaziz, Rashed (EGY)
20 January 2012; 11:00	Mwasesa 10	(14–8)	Titou 10	Salle Ibn Yassine, Salé; Referees: Abdelaziz, Rashed (EGY)

=== Final ===
20 January 2012; 17:00	Angola	26–24	Tunisia	Salle Ibn Yassine, Salé; Referees: Coulibaly, Diabate (CIV)
20 January 2012; 17:00	Marcelina 8	(12–12)	Chebbah, Toumi 7	Salle Ibn Yassine, Salé; Referees: Coulibaly, Diabate (CIV)

== Final standings ==
Qualified for the 2013 World Championship

Rank	Team	Record
Gold medal	Angola	7–0–0
Silver medal	Tunisia	6–0–1
Bronze medal	DR Congo	3–2–2
4	Algeria	4–0–3
5	Cameroon	4–0–3
6	Congo	3–0–4
7	Ivory Coast	2–1–4
8	Senegal	1–0–6
9	Egypt	1–1–3
10	Morocco	0–0–5

== Awards ==
2012 African Women's Handball Championship

Angola
11th title

Best Player

=== All-Tournament Team ===
GK	(Angola)	Odeth Tavares
RW	(Algeria)	Nabila Tizi
RB	(Angola)	Luísa Kiala
CB	(Tunisia)	Mouna Chebbah
LB	(Democratic Republic of the Congo)	Christianne Mwasesa
LW	(Angola)	Natália Bernardo
P	(Tunisia)	Asma Elghaoui

== See also ==
- 2012 African Women's Handball Champions League
- 2011 African Women's Youth Handball Championship
