= Sa'd al-Din =

Sa'd al-Din (Arabic: سعد الدين), also written Saad Eddine or Saadeddine, is an Arabic name and given name. People with the name include:

== People ==
- Sa'd al-Din Köpek (died 1240), court administrator under Seljuq Sultans of Rum
- Taftazani (Sa'ad al-Din Masud ibn Umar ibn Abd Allah al-Taftazani, 1322–1390), Persian scholar
- Sa'ad ad-Din II (ruled c. 1400), Sultan of the Ifat Sultanate
- Hoca Sadeddin Efendi (1536–1599), Turkish scholar, official, and historian
- Sa'd al-Din Hu Songshan (1880–1955), Chinese imam and leader of the Yihewani Muslim sect
- Saad Eddin Ibrahim (born 1938), Egyptian-American sociologist and author
- Saadeddine Othmani (born 1956), Moroccan psychiatrist and politician
- Saad Hariri (Saad ed Deen Rafiq al-Hariri, born 1970), Prime Minister of Lebanon
- Mohamed Saad El Din Sherif (died 1997), Egyptian general

== Places ==
- Zeila Archipelago (also known as Sa'ad ad-Din Islands)

== See also ==
- Saad (disambiguation)
  - Saad, a given name
- Saadallah, a given name
- Sad ol Din, a village in Iran
- Sadettin, Turkish version of the name
- Saladin (disambiguation)
