= Burned Alive =

Book

Burned Alive: A Victim of the Law of Men is a best-selling book, ostensibly a first-person account of an attempted honor killing. The author, Souad, is described as a Palestinian woman now living in Europe who survived an attempted murder by her brother-in-law, who doused her with gasoline and set her on fire, at the urging of her family. The book was written as a result of repressed memory therapy, a scientifically discredited form of psychotherapy.

Souad was saved by a Swiss NGO named Terre des Hommes, in collaboration of the Red Cross. She stayed in a hospital several months where she learned French, the language in which she wrote the book Brûlée vive. When the book was published in 2003, she made several appearances on the French National TV.

== Controversy ==
According to the book, she forgot about the incident for two decades until it was recovered through repressed memory therapy. Thérèse Taylor, an Australian historian, has pointed out numerous medical, historical and cultural inconsistencies in the book that put its authenticity in doubt.

Souad claims to have survived the attempt without medical assistance despite having burns to 70 percent of her body – a medical impossibility (a press release by the publisher of the US edition increased that figure to an even less plausible 90 percent). Souad also recalls her sister being choked with a telephone cord at a time when Palestinian villages did not have telephones.
