= Soad (disambiguation) =

SOAD is a common initialism for Armenian-American heavy metal band System of a Down.

Soad may also refer to:

== Education ==
- The Penny W. Stamps School of Art & Design at the University of Michigan
- The School of Architecture and Design at the University of Louisiana at Lafayette
- The School of Art and Design, part of the College of Fine Arts and Communication at East Carolina University
- The Student Organizations and Activities Division at Silliman University

== People ==
- Souad, list of people with name, including Soad

== Other uses ==
- The Hajja Soad mosque, a mosque in Khartoum
- Service-oriented analysis and design, a concept in service-oriented modeling

== See also ==
- Soap (disambiguation)
