= Sadi (name) =

Sadi and its variant Saadi are used as a masculine given name and a surname. Notable people with the name include:

== Given name ==
=== Sadi ===
- Sadi Carnot, multiple people
- Sadi Celil Cengiz (born 1983), Turkish actor
- Sadi Dastarac (1888–1911), French football player
- Sadi Eldem (1910–1995), Turkish diplomat
- Sadi Gülçelik (1929–1980), Turkish basketball player, civil engineer and entrepreneur
- Sadi Güven (born 1955), Turkish judge
- Sadi Irmak (1904–1990), Turkish academic and politician
- Sadi Jalali (born 1995), Indian-born Canadian professional soccer player
- Sadi Kalabar (1901–1960), Yugoslav chess player
- Sadi Koçaş (1919–1998), Turkish military officer and politician
- Sadi Pol Lallemand (1927–2009), known as Fats Sadi, Belgian jazz musician
- Sadi Mohammad, Bangladeshi singer and composer
- Sadi Schwerdt, Brazilian footballer

=== Saadi ===
- Al-Saadi Gaddafi (born 1973), Libyan football player
- Saadi Al Munla (1890–1975), Lebanese politician
- Saâdi Radouani (born 1995), Algerian football player
- Saadi Shirazi (1210–1292), major Persian-language poet and writer
- Saadi Simawe (1946–2017), Iraqi-American author, teacher, and translator
- Saadi Toma (born 1955), Iraqi football player
- Saadi Yacef (1928–2021), Algerian politician
- Saadi Youssef (1934–2021), Iraqi writer and publisher

== Surname ==
=== Sadi ===
- Amir Hamudi Hasan al-Sadi (born 1938), Iraqi chemical engineer and weapons developer
- Amira Sadi (born 1994), Algerian volleyball player
- Andréia Sadi (born 1987), Brazilian journalist
- Dahiru Sadi (born 1963), Nigerian football player
- Dominic Sadi (born 2003), English football player
- Hakim Sadi (born 1992), Algerian athlete
- Joseph Sadi-Lecointe (1891–1944), French aviator
- Mohamed Sadi (born 1995), Libyan basketball player
- Nawaf Al-Sadi (born 2000), Saudi Arabian football player
- René Sadi (born 1948), Cameroonian politician
- Saïd Sadi (born 1947), Algerian political activist
- Walid Muhammed Sadi (1939–2019), Jordanian diplomat

=== Saadi ===
- Ahmed Mubarak Al-Saadi, Omani sprinter
- Dheyaa al-Saadi, Iraqi lawyer
- Elvira Saadi (born 1952) Soviet gymnast
- Farhan al-Saadi (1862–1937), Palestinian rebel commander
- Idriss Saadi (born 1992), Algerian French football player
- Mohamed Obaid Al-Saadi (born 1994), Omani athlete
- Noureddine Saâdi (1950–2021), Algerian football manager
- Osama Saadi (born 1963), Israeli lawyer and politician
- Ramón Saadi (born 1949), Argentine politician
- Samer Saadi (died 2005), member of the Al Aqsa Martyrs' Brigades
- Suhayl Saadi (born 1961), Scottish author and physician
- Vicente Saadi (1913–1988), Argentine politician
- Wade E. Saadi, American philatelist

== Fictional characters ==
- Sadi, a eunuch in The Belgariad and The Malloreon series of novels
