= Saado =

Saado is a given name and surname. Notable persons with the name may include:

- Saado Ali Warsame (1950–2014), Somali-American singer-songwriter and politician
- Saado Abdel Salam Fouflia (born 1997), Palestinian footballer
- Yehuda Saado (born 1983), Israeli singer, winner of the Israeli music competition program Kokhav Nolad

== See also ==
- Saad
