= Mohamed Saad =

Mohamed Saad may refer to:

- Mohamed Saad (actor), Egyptian film actor
- Mohamed Saad (athlete), Kuwaiti sprinter
- Mohamed Saad (swimmer), Yemeni swimmer
- Mohammad Saad, Pakistani cricketer
