= Souad Bendjaballah =

Algerian lawyer, activist, and politician

- Citizenship: Algeria
- Occupations: Human Rights Activist , lawyer, politician
- Known for: Human rights activists

Souad Bendjaballah is an Algerian lawyer, activist for women's rights and politician.

== Biography ==
Souad is a member of the research group History of women in the Mediterranean with Fatima-Zohra Guechi and participated in this symposium in November 1999 at Constantine 1 University. On October 8, 2003, she was appointed Minister Delegate to the Minister of Higher Education, in charge of scientific research. She held this position until 2012. On September 4, 2012, she was appointed Minister of National Solidarity, Family and the Status of Women under the government of Abdelmalek Sellal. She was reappointed to the post under the second government of Abdelmalek Sellal during the reshuffle of September 11, 2013. She held this position until May 2014.

In 2017 she was the Minister of Solidarity.
