= Sadi, Nepal =

Sadi साडी
- Village development committee
- Location in Nepal
- Coordinates: 27.58°N 83.23°E
- Country: Nepal
- Province: Lumbini Province
- District: Rupandehi District

Population (1991)
  - Total: 4,008
- Time zone: UTC+5:45 (Nepal Time)

Sadi is a village development committee in Rupandehi District in Lumbini Province of southern Nepal. At the time of the 1991 Nepal census it had a population of 4008 people living in 621 individual households.
