= Mouna Chebbah =

Tunisian handball player (born 1982)

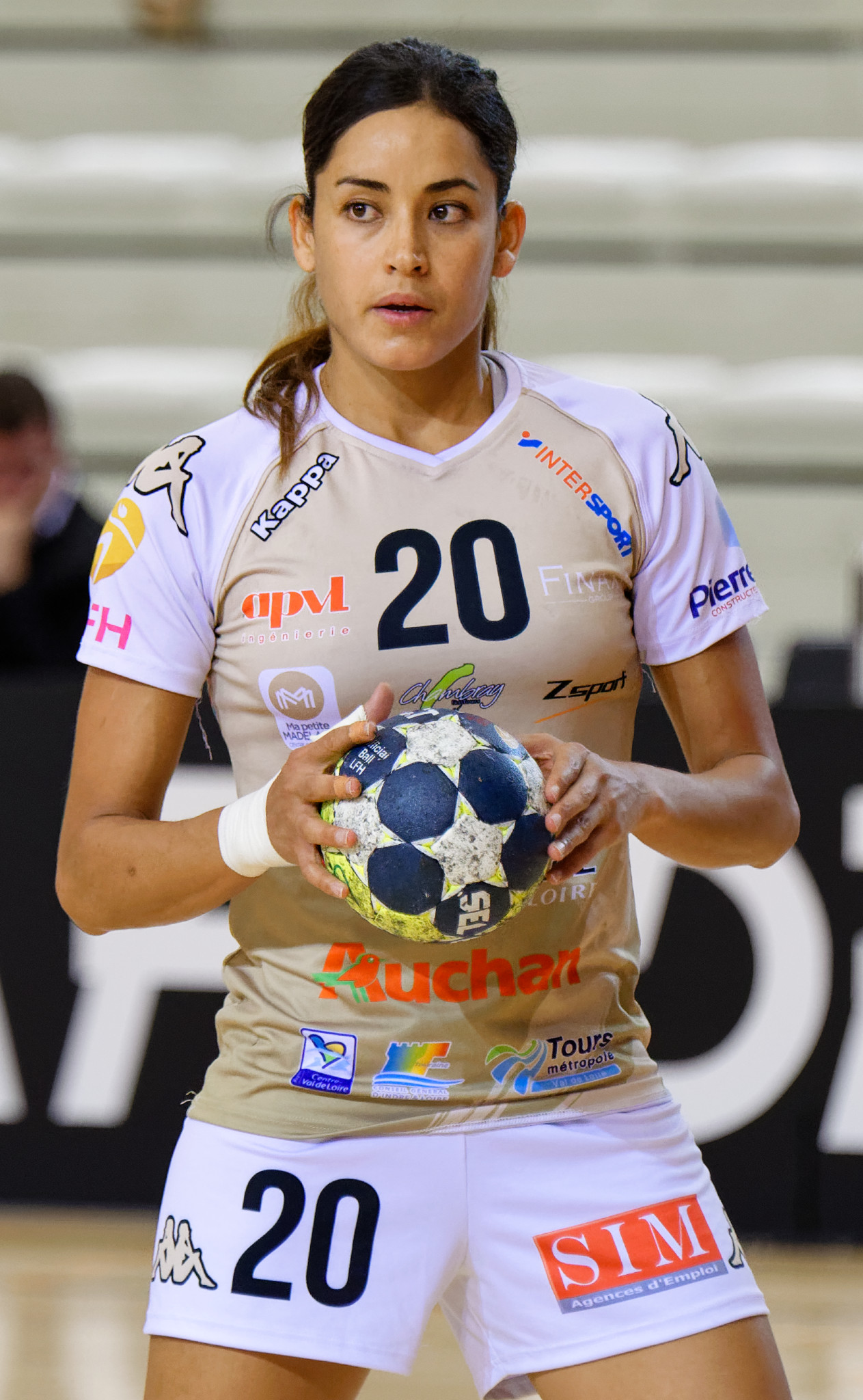
- Sep. 15, 2017

Personal information
- Nationality: Tunisian
- Born: 8 July 1982 (age 44) Mahdia, Tunisia
- Height: 1.76 m (5 ft 9 in)

Sport
- Sport: Handball
- Position: Centre back
- Current club: Kastamonu
- Number: 20

Senior clubs
- Years: Team
- 2005–2008: Besançon
- 2008–2010: Team Esbjerg
- 2010–2014: Viborg HK
- 2014–2016: Handball Cercle Nîmes
- 2016–2019: Chambray Touraine Handball
- 2019–2022: Bouillargues Handball Nîmes Métropole
- 2022–: Kastamonu
National team
| Years | Team | Apps | (Gls) |
| – | Tunisia | 232 | (1006) |

Mouna Chebbah (born 8 July 1982) is a Tunisian handballer for Kastamonu and the Tunisian national team. She is considered the best Tunisian player of all time and holds the record for both most caps and most goals on the Tunisian national team.

She was also a member of Danish club Viborg HK from 1 July 2010 until June 2014. In the summer of 2016 she signed with French handball club Chambray Touraine Handball.

== Career ==
=== National team ===
She participated in the 2009 World Championship in China, where Tunisia placed 14th, and Chebbah was among the top ten goal scorers.

Chebbah played the final of the 2010 Africa Nations Championship, where Tunisia lost against Angola. She was voted best player of the tournament.

In 2011 she participated in the 2011 World Women's Handball Championship in Brazil, where the Tunisian team placed 18th. At the 2012 African Women's Handball Championship in Morocco, where Tunisia placed second behind Angola, Chebbah was selected to the All-Tournament Team, and was voted the best player of the championship for a second time in a row. She participated in the 2013 World Women's Handball Championship in Serbia, where Tunisia placed 17th.

At the 2014 African Women's Handball Championship, she won a gold medal with the Tunisian team, which defeated DR Congo in the final.

At the 2015 World Women's Handball Championship in Denmark, Chebbah was among the top ten goal scorers, while Tunisia placed 21st in the championship.

=== Club career ===
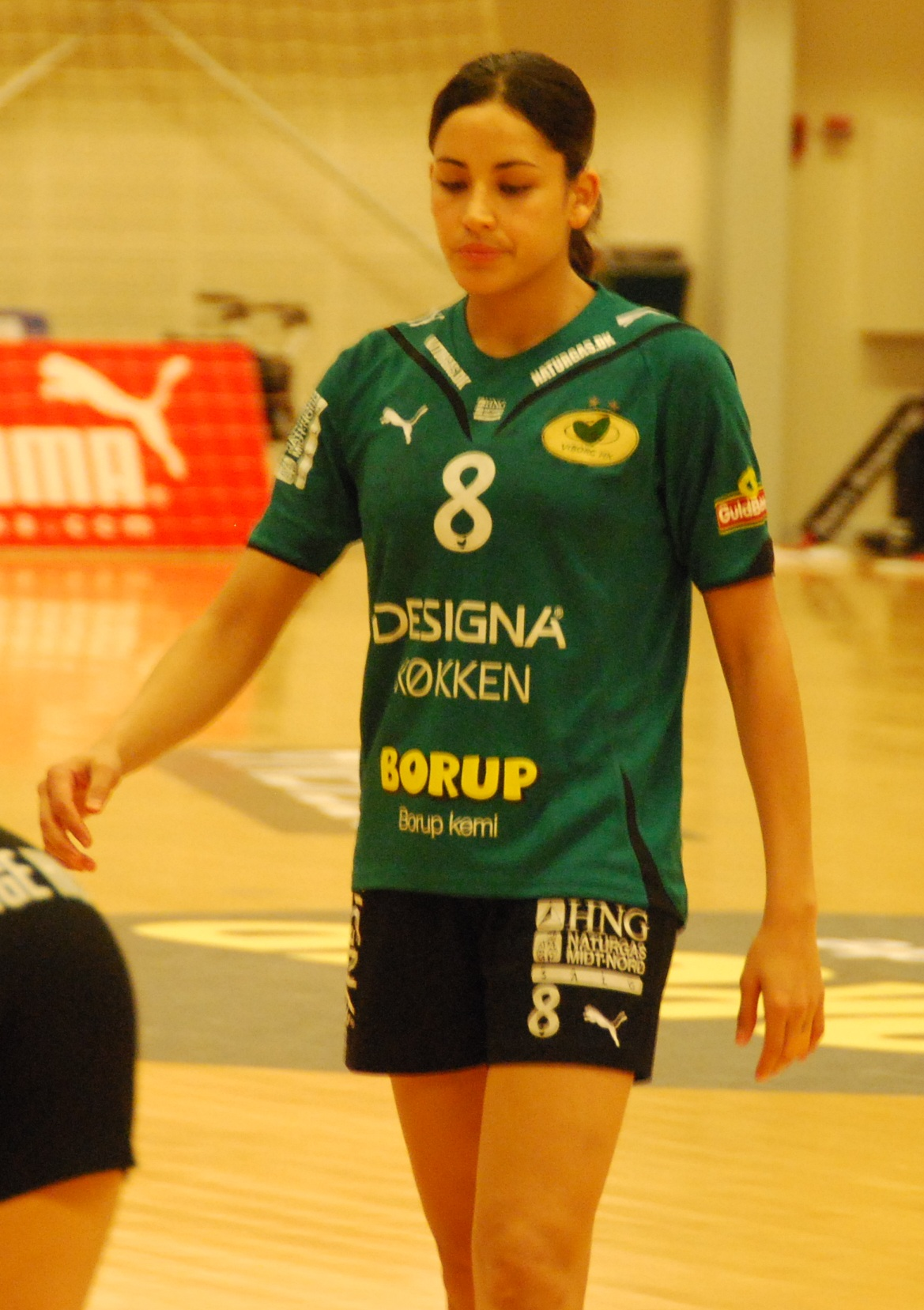
Mouna Chabbah in Viborg HK jersey, February 2011.

Mouna Chebbah played three seasons for French club Besançon before transferring to Team Esbjerg of the Danish league. During her two years with Esbjerg, she was chosen Best Player of the Season twice. She was also voted best playmaker of the league and was part of the All Star Team for the 2009/10 season.

In May 2010 Chebbah signed a three-year contract with Viborg HK. Here she won the Danish Championship in 2014.

== See also ==
- List of women's handballers with 1000 or more international goals
