= Sedi Township, Sichuan =

Sedi Township 色地镇
- Township
- Sedixiang
- Location in Sichuan
- Coordinates: 33°0′40″N 102°58′28″E
- Country: People's Republic of China
- Province: Sichuan
- Autonomous prefecture: Ngawa Tibetan and Qiang Autonomous Prefecture
- County: Hongyuan County

Area
  - Total: 1,191 km^{2} (460 sq mi)

Population (2010)
  - Total: 5,831
  - Density: 4.896/km^{2} (12.68/sq mi)
- Time zone: UTC+8 (China Standard)

Sedi (Chinese: 色地镇) is a township in Hongyuan County, Ngawa Tibetan and Qiang Autonomous Prefecture, Sichuan, China. In 2010, Sedi Township had a total population of 5,831: 2,870 males and 2,961 females: 1,507 aged under 14, 3,940 aged between 15 and 65 and 384 aged over 65.
