= Saad Specialist Hospital =

- SA International

Geography
- Location: Prince Faisal Bin Fahad Road, Al - Aqrabiyya, Eastern Region, Khobar, Saudi Arabia
- Coordinates: 26.3021654°N 50.200467°E

Organisation
- Type: Teaching; Specialist
- Affiliated university: Saad Training Institute; Saad College of Nursing

Services
- Standards: JCI
- Beds: 750

History
- Founded: 1997

Links
- Website: www.sainternational.us/saad-specialist-hospital/
- Lists: Hospitals in Saudi Arabia
- Other links: List of hospitals in Saudi Arabia

Saad Specialist Hospital, often abbreviated as SSH, is a private hospital in Khobar, Saudi Arabia. It was initially owned and operated by the Saad Group, founded in 2001 by a businessman, Maan Abdul Wahed Al-Sanea. SSH is a JCI accredited hospital. As of 2020, it is managed by SA International. It later went bankrupt and closed in 2017.

== History ==
Saad Specialist Hospital was founded as Saad Specialist Clinic on 1997, although their first patient was only admitted in 2001. It has a 600-bed capacity.

The Saad Group went into debt and closed in 2017. The hospital is currently managed by SA International.

== Certification ==
Saad Specialist Hospital has received accreditation from the Joint Commission International (JCI), the Canadian Council on Health Services Accreditation (CCHSA), and the Australian Council on Healthcare Standards International (ACHSI).

== Saad College of Nursing and Allied Health Sciences ==
The Saad College of Nursing and Allied Health Sciences is located on the hospital grounds. It was established in a unique partnership program with the University of Ulster.
