= Sadi, East Azerbaijan =

Sadi سعدی
- Village
- Location within Iran
- Coordinates: 37°38′16″N 47°05′50″E
- Country: Iran
- Province: East Azerbaijan
- County: Bostanabad
- Bakhsh: Tekmeh Dash
- Rural District: Abbas-e Sharqi

Population (2006)
  - Total: 62
- Time zone: UTC+3:30 (IRST)
  - Summer (DST): UTC+4:30 (IRDT)

Sadi (Persian: سعدی, also Romanized as Sa‘dī) is a village in Abbas-e Sharqi Rural District, Tekmeh Dash District, Bostanabad County, East Azerbaijan Province, Iran. At the 2006 census, its population was 62, in 11 families.
