= Sadi, Khuzestan =

Sadi سعدی
- Village
- Location within Iran
- Coordinates: 30°37′34″N 48°39′28″E
- Country: Iran
- Province: Khuzestan
- County: Shadegan
- Bakhsh: Central
- Rural District: Abshar

Population (2006)
  - Total: 414
- Time zone: UTC+3:30 (IRST)
  - Summer (DST): UTC+4:30 (IRDT)

Sadi (Persian: سعدی, also Romanized as Sa‘dī) is a village in Abshar Rural District, in the Central District of Shadegan County, Khuzestan Province, Iran. At the 2006 census, its population was 414, in 67 families.
