= Sadi Carnot =

Sadi Carnot (English: /kɑːrˈnoʊ/, French: [kaʁno]) may refer to:

- Nicolas Léonard Sadi Carnot (1796–1832), French physicist, the father of thermodynamics
- Marie François Sadi Carnot (1837–1894), president of the third French Republic, and nephew of Nicolas Léonard Sadi Carnot
