= Christianne Mwasesa =

Congolese handball player

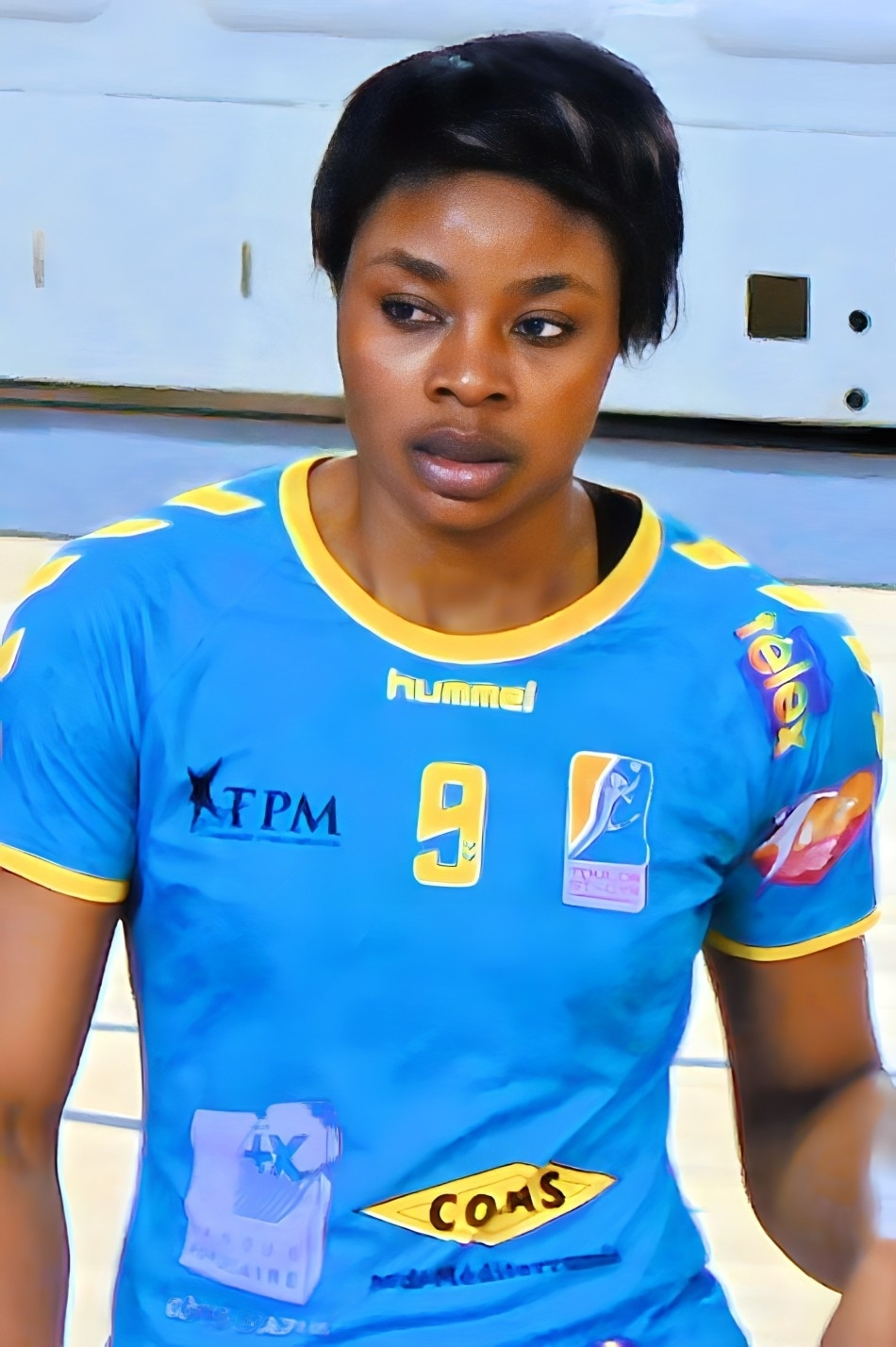
- 2014

Personal information
- Full name: Christianne Mwasesa Mwange
- Nationality: Congolese
- Born: 23 March 1985 (age 41) Lubumbashi, Zaire
- Height: 1.75 m (5 ft 9 in)

Sport
- Sport: Handball
- Position: Left back
- Current club: Primeiro de Agosto
- Number: 23

Senior clubs
- Years: Team
- -2008: Abidjan
- 2008-2009: Mérignac Handball
- 2009-2014: Toulon Saint-Cyr Var Handball
- 2014-: Primeiro de Agosto
National team
- Years: Team
- –: DR Congo
Medal record
African Women's Handball Championship
Silver medal – second place	2014 Algeria	Team
Bronze medal – third place	2012 Morocco	Team
African Games
Silver medal – second place	2023 Accra	Team
Bronze medal – third place	2019 Rabat	Team

Christianne Mwasesa Mwange (born 23 March 1985) is a Congolese handball player for Primeiro de Agosto and the DR Congo national team.

She competed at the 2013 World Women's Handball Championship in Serbia, where DR Congo placed 20th, and Mwasesa was top scorer for the Congolese team with 42 goals. She also represented DR Congo at the 2015 World Women's Handball Championship.

== Career ==
Mwasesa started her career at Abidjan in the Ivory Coast, where she played until 2008. She then joined French second-tier side Mérignac Handball.

After one season she joined Toulon Saint-Cyr Var Handball in the top league. Here she won the 2010 French Championship. In the 2010–11 season and the 2011–12 season she won the French Cup back-to-back. In January 2013 she took a break from handball due to pregnancy. In 2014 she left the team.

Later she joined the Angolan team Primeiro de Agosto. Here she won the 2022 and 2023 African Handball Champions League.

=== National team ===
Mwasesa represented Congo at the 2012 African Championship, where the team won bronze medals and qualified for the 2013 World Women's Handball Championship.

At the 2014 African Championship, she won silver medals with the Congolese team, losing to Angola in the final. This qualified Congo for the 2015 World Women's Handball Championship.

At the 2023 African Games she won silver medals with DR Congo.
