= Souad Titou =

Algerian handball player (born 1986)

Personal information
- Nationality: Algerian
- Born: 14 February 1986 (age 40) Aïn Kercha, Algeria
- Height: 1.84 m (6 ft 0 in)

Sport
- Sport: Handball
- Position: Left back
- Current club: Lille HBCL
National team
Years	Team	Apps	(Gls)
–	Algeria	85	(340)

Souad Titou (born 14 February 1986) is an Algerian team handball player. She plays for the club Lomme Lille, and helped the Algeria women's national handball team place 22nd at the 2013 world championship games in Serbia.
