= Nabila Tizi =

Algerian handball player (born 1984)

Nabila Tizi-Sadki
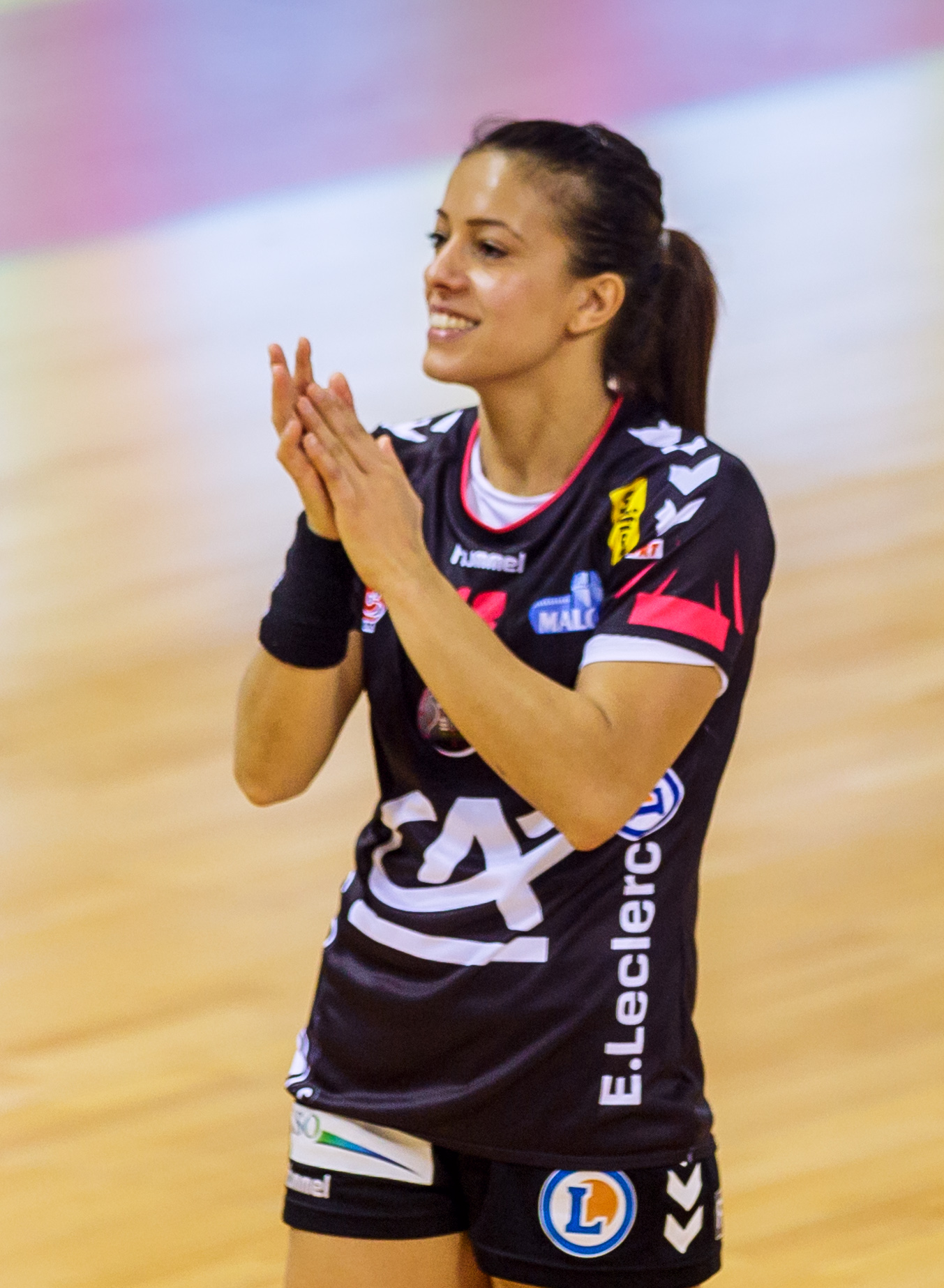

Personal information
- Nationality: Algerian
- Born: 20 March 1984 (age 42) Akbou, Algeria
- Height: 1.85 m (6 ft 1 in)

Sport
- Sport: Handball
- Position: Right back
- Current club: Retired

Senior clubs
- Years: Team
- –: (Algeria) JS Awzelaguen
- –2007: (Algeria) HBC El-Biar
- 2007–2012: (France) ESBF Besançon
- 2012–2013: (France) Angoulême
- 2013–2017: (France) Brest Bretagne Handball
- 2017–2018: (France) Landi-Lampaul
National team
Years	Team	Apps	(Gls)
2009–2018	Algeria	83	(332)

Nabila Tizi-Sadki (born 20 March 1984) is an Algerian former team handball player. She played for the club Brest Bretagne Handball, and on the Algerian national team. She competed at the 2013 World Women's Handball Championship in Serbia, where Algeria placed 22nd, and Tizi was top scorer for the Algerian team.
