= Sədi =

- Location within Azerbaijan
- Coordinates: 39°21′08.2″N 47°00′54.0″E
- Country: Azerbaijan
- District: Jabrayil
- Time zone: UTC+4 (AZT)
  - Summer (DST): UTC+5 (AZT)

Sədi is a village in the Jabrayil District of Azerbaijan.
