= Raja Toumi =

Tunisian handball player (born 1978)

Personal information
- Nationality: Tunisian
- Born: 3 April 1978 (age 48) Tunis, Tunisia
- Height: 1.79 m (5 ft 10 in)

Sport
- Sport: Handball
- Position: Left back
- Current club: Orkanger IF as Coach
- Number: 19

Senior clubs
- Years: Team
- 1995–2004: ASF Sahel
- 2004–2006: Nordstrand 2000
- 2006–2009: Gjerpen IF
- 2009–2014: Byåsen HE
- 2014–2016: Club Africain
- 2018–2020: Orkanger IF
National team
Years	Team	Apps	(Gls)
–2015	Tunisia	230	(982)

Raja Toumi (born 3 April 1978) is a Tunisian handball player. She is coaching for Orkanger IF and previously for the Tunisian national team.

She was captain for the Tunisian team at the 2009 World Women's Handball Championship in China, where Tunisia placed 14th.
