= Hadja Cissé =

Senegalese handball player

Hadja Cisse
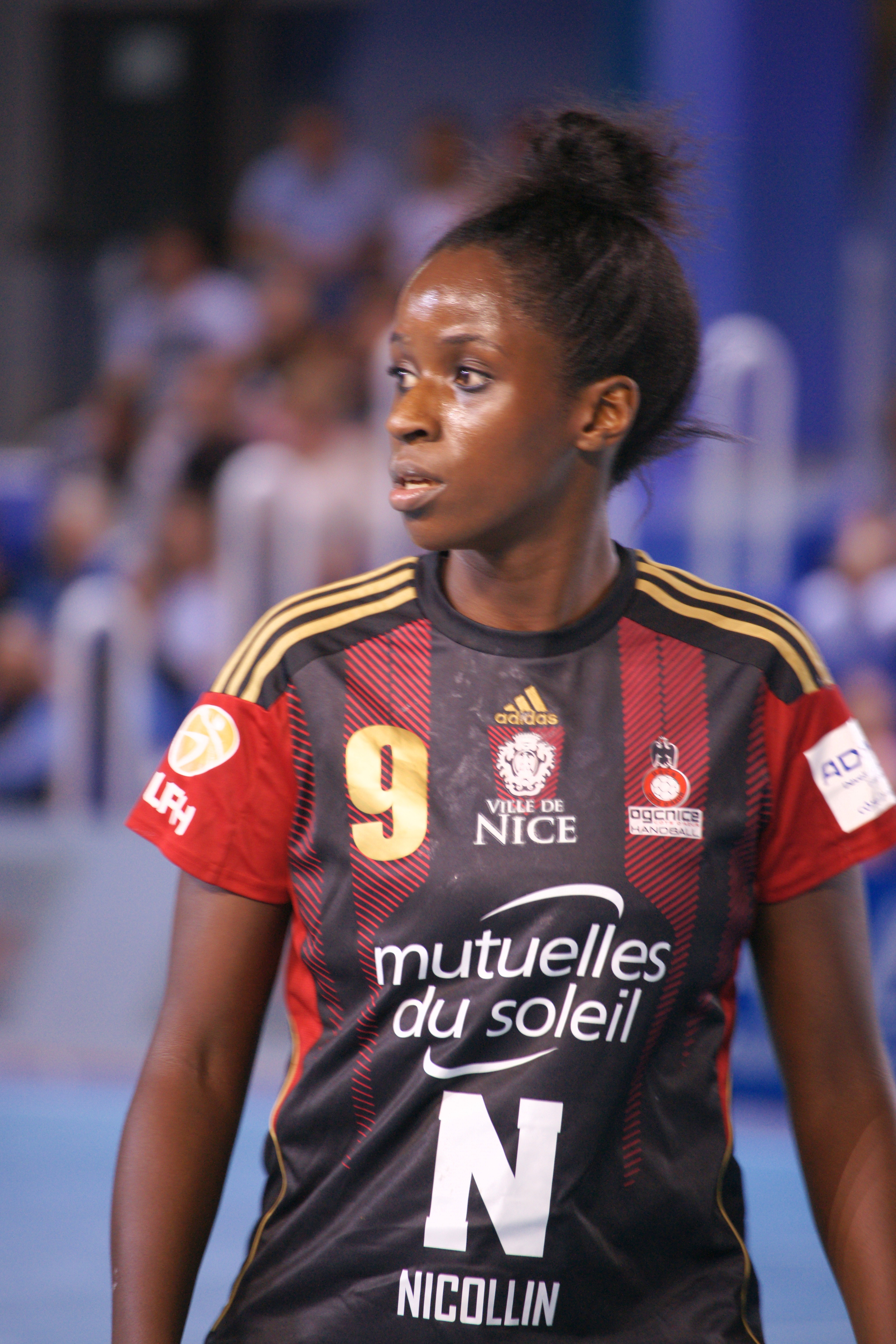
- Cissé (2016)

Personal information
- Born: 7 March 1991 (age 35) Épernay, France
- Height: 183 cm (72 in)

Sport
- Sport: Handball
- Position: Left wing
National team
Years	Team	Apps
2009-	Senegal	28
Medal record
African Games
Bronze medal – third place	2015 African Games
African Women's Handball Championship
Silver medal – second place	2018 Congo

Hadja Cissé (born 7 March 1991) is a Senegalese professional handball player.

== Biography ==
Cissé has competed most of her career in the French Women's Handball Championship representing various clubs including Yutz HBF, Abbeville HBF, AS Cannes, Fleury Loiret HB and OGC Nice Côte d'Azur Handball. She was part of the 2016 Coupe de la Ligue Française winners Fleury Loiret HB squad. She also played for the Norwegian club Sola HK between 2017 and 2018.

Internationally Cisse has played for the Senegal women's national handball team, winning a bronze medal at the 2015 African Games and a silver medal at the 2018 African Women's Handball Championship.

Cissé played in the left backcourt position for the French handball team HBCSA Porte du Hainaut but left the club in 2019 after 11 appearances.
