= 2013 World Women's Handball Championship squads =

This article displays the squads for the 2013 World Women's Handball Championship, held in Serbia, the 21st edition of the event. Each team consisted of up to 18 players, of whom 16 may be fielded for each match.

== Group A ==
=== Dominican Republic ===
Head coach: Miroslav Vujasinović

No.	Pos.	Name	Date of birth (age)	Height	App.	Goals	Club
1	GK	Cari Dominguez	10 October 1992 (aged 21)	1.74 m		0	(Dominican Republic) Maquiteria Handball
2	LB	Yojaver Brito	3 December 1997 (aged 16)	1.59 m		25	(Dominican Republic) Simon Bolivar Handball
5	LW	Devora Torreira	1 January 1991 (aged 22)	1.79 m			(Dominican Republic) Los Frailes
7	RW	Johanna Pimentel	20 April 1992 (aged 21)	1.90 m		80	(Dominican Republic) Ortiz Celado
8	LB	Nancy Peña	29 July 1982 (aged 31)	1.62 m		94	(Dominican Republic) Simon Bolivar Handball
9	RB	Mariela Andino	9 October 1992 (aged 21)	1.68 m		90	(Dominican Republic) Maquiteria Handball
10	CB	Carina Lorenzo	4 June 1997 (aged 16)	1.71 m		35	(Dominican Republic) Maquiteria Handball
11	LB	Florquidia Puello	27 July 1997 (aged 16)	1.79 m		35	(Dominican Republic) Simon Bolivar Handball
12	GK	Suleidy Suarez	8 July 1992 (aged 21)	1.68 m		0	(Dominican Republic) Ortiz Celado
13	CB	Carolina López	16 November 1993 (aged 20)	1.74 m		95	(Dominican Republic) Simon Bolivar Handball
14	P	Yacaira Tejada	20 August 1992 (aged 21)	1.75 m		90	(Dominican Republic) Parque del Este
15	LB	Mariela Cespedes	13 November 1993 (aged 20)	1.68 m		85	(Dominican Republic) Maquiteria Handball
17	W	Irina Pop	8 October 1988 (aged 25)	1.90 m		100	(Dominican Republic) Parque del Este
23	CB	Crisleydi Hernández	10 January 1983 (aged 30)	1.78 m		93	(Dominican Republic) Simon Bolivar Handball

=== DR Congo ===
Head coach: Celestin Mpoua

No.	Pos.	Name	Date of birth (age)	Height	App.	Goals	Club
1	GK	Luisa Makubanza	20 October 1992 (aged 21)	1.73 m			(France) Nantes LA HB
2	RB	Jumelle Okoko	26 December 1984 (aged 28)	1.70 m			(France) Blavozy RB
3	CB	Grace Shokkos	4 August 1992 (aged 21)	1.72 m			(France) Poitiers Handball
4	CB	Consolate Feza	23 March 1985 (aged 28)	1.67 m			(Democratic Republic of the Congo) Mikishi Lubumbashi
5	LW	Olga Milemba	27 July 1984 (aged 29)	1.68 m			(Democratic Republic of the Congo) Héritage Kinshasa
6	LW	Clémence Matutu	26 April 1992 (aged 21)	1.62 m			(France) Poitiers Handball
7	RB	Apopie Lusamba	20 May 1985 (aged 28)	1.70 m			(France) USM Gagny
8	CB	Constance Louoba	14 June 1971 (aged 42)	1.70 m			(France) Blavozy RB
9	LB	Christianne Mwasesa	12 March 1985 (aged 28)	1.75 m			(France) Toulon Handball
11	P	Parisel Mpemba	1 December 1978 (aged 35)	1.75 m			(France) Sainte Maure-Troyes
12	GK	Nicole Mbole	12 December 1981 (aged 31)	1.60 m			(Democratic Republic of the Congo) Mikishi Lubumbashi
13	LB	Lydia Musonda Kasangala	6 May 1988 (aged 25)	1.70 m			(Democratic Republic of the Congo) Héritage Kinshasa
14	LB	Carole Babala	14 June 1989 (aged 24)	1.70 m			(France) U.S. Alfortville
16	GK	Bibiche Kabamba	15 July 1981 (aged 32)	1.78 m			(Democratic Republic of the Congo) Héritage Kinshasa
17	LB	Julie Betu	25 August 1995 (aged 18)	1.63 m			(Democratic Republic of the Congo) Héritage Kinshasa

=== France ===
Head coach: Alain Portes

No.	Pos.	Name	Date of birth (age)	Height	App.	Goals	Club
2	P	Amélie Goudjo	19 April 1980 (aged 33)	1.73 m	90	122	(France) Issy-Paris Hand
4	P	Nina Kamto Njitam	25 June 1983 (aged 30)	1.78 m	181	239	(France) Metz Handball
5	RB	Koumba Cissé	4 June 1991 (aged 22)	1.75 m	0	0	(France) Fleury Loiret HB
7	CB	Allison Pineau	2 May 1989 (aged 24)	1.81 m	136	325	(North Macedonia) ŽRK Vardar
9	LW	Paule Baudouin	25 October 1984 (aged 29)	1.72 m	181	560	(France) Metz Handball
10	CB	Grace Zaadi	7 July 1993 (aged 20)	1.71 m	2	3	(France) Metz Handball
11	RW	Maakan Tounkara	12 March 1983 (aged 30)	1.64 m	63	125	(France) Fleury Loiret HB
12	GK	Amandine Leynaud	2 May 1986 (aged 27)	1.78 m	136	1	(North Macedonia) ŽRK Vardar
14	LB	Alice Lévêque	9 May 1989 (aged 24)	1.82 m	9	3	(France) Mios Biganos Handball
16	GK	Cléopâtre Darleux	1 July 1989 (aged 24)	1.76 m	112	2	(Denmark) Viborg HK
17	LW	Siraba Dembélé	28 June 1986 (aged 27)	1.72 m	158	518	(North Macedonia) ŽRK Vardar
18	RW	Audrey Deroin	6 September 1986 (aged 27)	1.76 m	98	147	(France) Toulon Handball
19	P	Julie Goiorani	25 May 1988 (aged 25)	1.73 m	43	45	(France) Toulon Handball
20	RB	Dounia Abdourahim	17 January 1992 (aged 21)	1.82 m	4	7	(France) Toulon Handball
24	LB	Mariama Signaté	22 July 1985 (aged 28)	1.88 m	138	406	(France) Issy-Paris Hand
29	CB	Gnonsiane Niombla	9 July 1990 (aged 23)	1.72 m	7	15	(France) Fleury Loiret HB
64	RB	Alexandra Lacrabère	27 April 1987 (aged 26)	1.77 m	123	311	(France) Mios Biganos Handball

=== Montenegro ===
The preliminary squad was announced on 17 November 2013.

Head coach: Dragan Adžić

No.	Pos.	Name	Date of birth (age)	Height	App.	Goals	Club
1	GK	Marina Vukčević	24 August 1993 (aged 20)	1.78 m	54	0	(Montenegro) ŽRK Budućnost
2	RW	Radmila Miljanić-Petrovic	19 April 1988 (aged 25)	1.74 m	103	125	(Montenegro) ŽRK Budućnost
3	LW	Biljana Pavićević	12 May 1988 (aged 25)	1.70 m	19	29	(Montenegro) ŽRK Budućnost
4	RW	Jovanka Radičević	23 October 1986 (aged 27)	1.69 m	104	561	(North Macedonia) ŽRK Vardar
5	P	Ana Đokić	9 February 1979 (aged 34)	1.67 m	43	82	(North Macedonia) ŽRK Vardar
6	LB	Jelena Despotović	30 April 1994 (aged 19)	1.83 m	9	8	(Montenegro) ŽRK Budućnost
8	LB	Marija Jovanović	26 December 1985 (aged 27)	1.82 m	96	416	(Russia) HC Astrakhanochka
10	CB	Anđela Bulatović	15 January 1987 (aged 26)	1.75 m	95	149	(Slovenia) RK Krim
12	GK	Sonja Barjaktarović	11 September 1986 (aged 27)	1.80 m	96	0	(Russia) Rostov-Don
15	RB	Andrea Klikovac	5 May 1991 (aged 22)	1.74 m	13	5	(North Macedonia) ŽRK Vardar
16	GK	Mirjana Milenković	4 March 1985 (aged 28)	1.83 m			(Montenegro) ŽRK Budućnost
19	P	Sara Vukčević	25 March 1992 (aged 21)	1.83 m			(Hungary) Érdi VSE
23	RB	Djurdjina Malović	5 May 1996 (aged 17)	1.82 m			(Montenegro) RK Danilovgrad
26	P	Suzana Lazović	28 January 1992 (aged 21)	1.76 m	65	74	(Montenegro) ŽRK Budućnost
32	RB	Katarina Bulatović	15 November 1984 (aged 29)	1.86 m	33	206	(Hungary) Győri Audi ETO KC
77	LW	Majda Mehmedović	25 May 1990 (aged 23)	1.69 m	61	107	(Montenegro) ŽRK Budućnost
90	CB	Milena Knežević	12 March 1990 (aged 23)	1.78 m	86	224	(Montenegro) ŽRK Budućnost

=== Netherlands ===
The squad was announced on 7 November 2013.

Head coach: Henk Groener

No.	Pos.	Name	Date of birth (age)	Height	App.	Goals	Club
1	GK	Marieke van der Wal	7 November 1979 (aged 34)	1.83 m	157	0	(France) Pontoise Handball
4	LW	Sharina van Dort	18 October 1988 (aged 25)	1.68 m	37	69	(Netherlands) SERCODAK Dalfsen
5	LB	Jessy Kramer	16 February 1990 (aged 23)	1.77 m	51	59	(Norway) Vipers Kristiansand
6	RB	Laura van der Heijden	27 June 1990 (aged 23)	1.72 m	98	318	(Germany) VfL Oldenburg
7	RW	Debbie Bont	9 December 1990 (aged 22)	1.74 m	70	151	(Germany) HC Leipzig
8	LB	Lois Abbingh	13 August 1992 (aged 21)	1.77 m	56	228	(Germany) VfL Oldenburg
9	RB	Sanne van Olphen	13 March 1989 (aged 24)	1.77 m	21	25	(Denmark) SønderjyskE
10	P	Danick Snelder	22 May 1990 (aged 23)	1.78 m	70	166	(Germany) Thüringer HC
11	CB	Lynn Knippenborg	7 January 1992 (aged 21)	1.75 m	10	16	(Netherlands) SERCODAK Dalfsen
12	P	Fabienne Logtenberg	27 December 1991 (aged 21)	1.81 m	13	16	(Netherlands) SERCODAK Dalfsen
13	P	Yvette Broch	23 December 1990 (aged 22)	1.85 m	37	81	(France) Metz Handball
17	CB	Cornelia Groot	4 May 1988 (aged 25)	1.75 m	51	141	(Denmark) FC Midtjylland
18	CB	Kelly Dulfer	21 March 1994 (aged 19)	1.86 m	0	0	(Netherlands) Schuler Afbouwgroep
23	GK	Jasmina Jankovic	6 December 1986 (aged 27)	1.68 m	26	0	(Germany) Frisch Auf Göppingen
24	LW	Martine Smeets	5 May 1990 (aged 23)	1.72 m	21	49	(Germany) Thüringer HC
30	RW	Jurswailly Luciano	25 March 1991 (aged 22)	1.71 m	18	37	(France) Metz Handball
79	CB	Estavana Polman	5 August 1992 (aged 21)	1.74 m	46	112	(Denmark) Team Esbjerg

=== South Korea ===
Head coach: Lim Young-Chul

No.	Pos.	Name	Date of birth (age)	Height	App.	Goals	Club
2	RW	Kim Seon-Hwa	7 January 1991 (aged 22)	1.62 m			(South Korea) Incheon Sports Council
5	CB	Lee Hyo-Jin	22 April 1994 (aged 19)	1.67 m			(South Korea) Gyeongnam
7	LW	Choi Su-Min	9 January 1990 (aged 23)	1.75 m			(South Korea) Seoul City
10	P	Won Seon-Pil	6 August 1994 (aged 19)	1.75 m			(South Korea) Incheon Sports Council
12	GK	Park Mi-Ra	20 April 1987 (aged 26)	1.70 m			(South Korea) Wonderful Samcheok
13	P	Yoo Hyun-Ji	16 July 1984 (aged 29)	1.75 m			(South Korea) Wonderful Samcheok
14	LB	Kim Jin-Yi	20 June 1993 (aged 20)	1.78 m			(South Korea) Colorful Daegu
15	RB	Jung Yu-Ra	6 February 1992 (aged 21)	1.70 m			(South Korea) Colorful Daegu
16	GK	Song Mi-Young	16 January 1975 (aged 38)	1.72 m			(South Korea) Incheon Sports Council
17	RB	Ryu Eun-Hee	24 February 1990 (aged 23)	1.80 m			(South Korea) Incheon Sports Council
19	CB	Jung Ji-Hae	6 March 1985 (aged 28)	1.68 m			(South Korea) Wonderful Samcheok
20	LW	Lee Eun-Bi	23 October 1990 (aged 23)	1.62 m			(South Korea) Busan Infrastructure
21	LB	Kim Eun-Kyeong	3 September 1991 (aged 22)	1.78 m			(South Korea) Gyeongnam
22	RW	Woo Sun-Hee	1 July 1978 (aged 35)	1.70 m			(South Korea) Wonderful Samcheok
23	P	Nam Yeong-Sin	27 August 1990 (aged 23)	1.76 m			(South Korea) Gyeongnam
24	CB	Gwon Han-Na	22 November 1989 (aged 24)	1.72 m			(South Korea) Seoul City

== Group B ==
=== Algeria ===
A preliminary squad was announced on 21 November 2013.

Head coach: Mourad Ait Ouarab

No.	Pos.	Name	Date of birth (age)	Height	App.	Goals	Club
1	GK	Souhila Abdelkader	21 April 1978 (aged 35)	1.62 m	12	0	(Algeria) GS Pétroliers
3	LW	Sarah Khouiled	8 December 1992 (aged 20)	1.71 m	5	2	(Hungary) Szeged KSZSE
5	CB	Nadia Belakhdar	16 April 1991 (aged 22)	1.69 m	0	0	(France) Noisy-le-Grand HB
6	CB	Nassima Dob	24 December 1980 (aged 32)	1.72 m	107	321	(Algeria) GS Pétroliers
7	P	Ratiba Hassnaoui	4 March 1987 (aged 26)	1.89 m	61	50	(Algeria) HBC El Biar
8	LB	Souad Titou	14 February 1986 (aged 27)	1.84 m	85	340	(France) Lille HBCL
11	RW	Amel Ait Ahmed	25 September 1989 (aged 24)	1.82 m	70	85	(Algeria) HBC El Biar
12	GK	Samia Sehabi	29 January 1981 (aged 32)	1.83 m	38	1	(Algeria) GS Pétroliers
13	LB	Rekia Ziadi	8 February 1986 (aged 27)	1.88 m	49	22	(Algeria) HHB Saida
14	RB	Lamia Izem	3 September 1980 (aged 33)	1.78 m	60	30	(Algeria) GS Pétroliers
15	CB	Fatiha Iberaken	3 April 1986 (aged 27)	1.68 m	15	12	(Algeria) HBC El Biar
16	GK	Fatima Boussora	3 July 1983 (aged 30)	1.73 m	12	0	(Algeria) HBC El Biar
17	LB	Sihem Hemissi	1 June 1985 (aged 28)	1.89 m	61	75	(Algeria) GS Pétroliers
18	RB	Nabila Tizi	20 March 1984 (aged 29)	1.85 m	83	332	(France) HBC Brest
19	P	Rima Khelil	21 March 1989 (aged 24)	1.70 m	10	15	(Algeria) RIJA Alger
20	LW	Souhila Benaicha	11 May 1988 (aged 25)	1.82 m	65	50	(Algeria) HBC El Biar

=== Brazil ===
The squad was announced on 8 November 2013.

Head coach: Morten Soubak

No.	Pos.	Name	Date of birth (age)	Height	App.	Goals	Club
2	P	Fabiana Diniz	13 May 1981 (aged 32)	1.83 m	157	291	(Austria) Hypo Niederösterreich
3	RW	Alexandra do Nascimento	16 September 1981 (aged 32)	1.77 m	133	502	(Austria) Hypo Niederösterreich
4	LW	Samira Rocha	26 January 1989 (aged 24)	1.70 m	53	139	(France) Mios Biganos Handball
5	P	Daniela Piedade	2 March 1979 (aged 34)	1.73 m	138	265	(Slovenia) RK Krim
6	LB	Amanda de Andrade	20 October 1989 (aged 24)	1.74 m	15	30	(Brazil) Concórdia
8	LW	Fernanda da Silva	25 September 1989 (aged 24)	1.76 m	70	281	(Austria) Hypo Niederösterreich
9	CB	Ana Paula Rodrigues	18 October 1987 (aged 26)	1.72 m	95	427	(Austria) Hypo Niederösterreich
12	GK	Bárbara Arenhart	4 October 1986 (aged 27)	1.82 m	59	1	(Austria) Hypo Niederösterreich
14	P	Elaine Gomes	9 January 1982 (aged 31)	1.79 m	5	0	(Brazil) Força Atlética
16	GK	Mayssa Pessoa	11 June 1984 (aged 29)	1.80 m	38	0	(Russia) Dinamo Volgograd
17	LB	Karoline de Souza	24 April 1990 (aged 23)	1.81 m	22	18	(Denmark) Team Tvis Holstebro
18	LB	Eduarda Amorim	23 September 1986 (aged 27)	1.86 m	116	370	(Hungary) Győri Audi ETO KC
19	CB	Deborah Nunes	14 March 1993 (aged 20)	1.59 m	16	30	(Brazil) Metodista
21	RW	Mariana Costa	14 October 1992 (aged 21)	1.66 m	1	0	(Denmark) Vendsyssel Håndbold
22	CB	Mayara Moura	5 December 1986 (aged 27)	1.70 m	63	102	Free agent
81	RB	Deonise Cavaleiro	20 June 1983 (aged 30)	1.80 m	105	241	(Austria) Hypo Niederösterreich

=== China ===
Head coach: Wang Xindong

No.	Pos.	Name	Date of birth (age)	Height	App.	Goals	Club
1	GK	Si Yan	9 December 1989 (aged 23)	1.82 m	71	0	(China) Anhui Club
2	LW	Chen Qian	26 January 1990 (aged 23)	1.73 m	16	18	(China) Anhui Club
3	LW	Wu Nana	4 March 1990 (aged 23)	1.76 m	45	38	(China) Shanghai Club
5	RB	Zu Cui	20 June 1990 (aged 23)	1.74 m	18	22	(China) Anhui Club
8	LB	Wang Shuihui	12 July 1993 (aged 20)	1.78 m	11	22	(China) Jiangsu Club
10	LB	Wang Shasha	8 January 1987 (aged 26)	1.76 m	195	420	(China) Shandong Club
11	LW	Yu Yuanyuan	30 January 1995 (aged 18)	1.72 m	5	7	(China) Jiangsu Club
12	GK	Wang Xiaohua	15 April 1993 (aged 20)	1.86 m	10	0	(China) Jiangsu Club
13	RB	Wu Yin	13 April 1988 (aged 25)	1.75 m	55	75	(China) Shanghai Club
16	GK	Hou Yibo	23 July 1991 (aged 22)	1.80 m	20	0	(China) Beijing Club
17	P	Zheng Dongdong	10 December 1988 (aged 24)	1.80 m	5	13	(China) Anhui Club
18	P	Sha Zhengwen	18 June 1990 (aged 23)	1.90 m	102	311	(China) Shanghai Club
19	RW	Zhang Haixia	10 February 1995 (aged 18)	1.75 m	32	107	(China) Jiangsu Club
20	LB	Yang Jiao	7 September 1994 (aged 19)	1.84 m	15	30	(China) Liaoning Club
21	CB	Zhao Jiaqin	22 January 1986 (aged 27)	1.74 m	177	533	(China) Jiangsu Club
24	LW	Li Yao	7 June 1992 (aged 21)	1.72 m	45	35	(China) Anhui Club

=== Denmark ===
The squad was announced on 22 November 2013.

Head coach: Jan Pytlick

No.	Pos.	Name	Date of birth (age)	Height	App.	Goals	Club
2	CB	Jane Schumacher	27 August 1988 (aged 25)	1.73 m	7	14	(Denmark) Skive fH
3	RW	Maibritt Kviesgaard	15 May 1986 (aged 27)	1.72 m	92	200	(Denmark) Team Esbjerg
4	P	Susan Thorsgaard	13 October 1988 (aged 25)	1.89 m	103	185	(Denmark) FCM Håndbold
7	LW	Maria Fisker	3 October 1990 (aged 23)	1.70 m	34	89	(Denmark) Viborg HK
8	LB	Anne Mette Hansen	25 August 1994 (aged 19)	1.77 m	5	10	(Denmark) Ajax Heroes
9	RB	Camilla Dalby	15 May 1988 (aged 25)	1.82 m	102	299	(Montenegro) ŽRK Budućnost
11	P	Mette Gravholt	12 December 1984 (aged 28)	1.72 m	28	71	(Denmark) Team Tvis Holstebro
12	GK	Cecilie Greve	19 January 1992 (aged 21)	1.87 m	17	0	(Denmark) HC Odense
13	P	Marianne Bonde	25 June 1984 (aged 29)	1.84 m	39	41	(Denmark) København Håndbold
15	LB	Pernille Larsen	6 September 1984 (aged 29)	1.84 m	99	112	(Denmark) København Håndbold
19	RB	Line Jørgensen	31 December 1989 (aged 23)	1.86 m	94	227	(Denmark) FCM Håndbold
20	GK	Rikke Poulsen	20 April 1986 (aged 27)	1.77 m	27	0	(Denmark) KIF Vejen
21	CB	Kristina Kristiansen	13 July 1989 (aged 24)	1.63 m	83	203	(Denmark) Team Tvis Holstebro
23	LW	Ann Grete Nørgaard	15 September 1983 (aged 30)	1.62 m	94	403	(Denmark) Team Tvis Holstebro
25	RW	Trine Østergaard Jensen	17 October 1991 (aged 22)	1.65 m	19	24	(Denmark) FCM Håndbold
27	RB	Louise Burgaard	17 October 1992 (aged 21)	1.78 m	47	118	(Denmark) Viborg HK
28	LB	Stine Jørgensen	3 September 1990 (aged 23)	1.80 m	48	96	(Denmark) FCM Håndbold

=== Japan ===
The squad was announced on 1 December 2013.

Head coach: Masamichi Kuriyama

No.	Pos.	Name	Date of birth (age)	Height	App.	Goals	Club
1	GK	Kimiko Hida	26 September 1977 (aged 36)	1.70 m	74	0	(Japan) Sony Semiconductor
2	LB	Kanna Masuda	8 October 1989 (aged 24)	1.75 m	2	4	(Japan) Hiroshima Maple Reds
3	RW	Megumi Takahashi	14 July 1986 (aged 27)	1.60 m	49	116	(Japan) Sony Semiconductor
4	LW	Shiori Kamimachi	21 January 1981 (aged 32)	1.65 m	56	220	(Japan) Hokkoku Bank
7	P	Arata Nishikiori	7 September 1991 (aged 22)	1.67 m	2	3	(Japan) Sony Semiconductor
9	P	Kaoru Yokoshima	11 December 1985 (aged 27)	1.61 m	27	48	(Japan) Hokkoku Bank
10	RB	Shio Fujii	27 March 1985 (aged 28)	1.64 m	93	481	(Japan) Omron Corporation
13	LW	Chie Katsuren	14 April 1989 (aged 24)	1.58 m	7	29	(Japan) Omron Corporation
16	GK	Sato Shiroishi	2 December 1992 (aged 21)	1.74 m			(Japan) Tokyo Women's College
17	LB	Yuko Arihama	18 August 1984 (aged 29)	1.78 m	108	284	(Japan) Omron Corporation
18	LW	Yuki Tanabe	25 August 1989 (aged 24)	1.70 m	15	54	(Japan) Hokkoku Bank
19	RW	Ayaka Ikehara	24 September 1990 (aged 23)	1.57 m	1	0	(Japan) MIE violet' IRIS
20	CB	Mayuko Ishitate	18 January 1987 (aged 26)	1.66 m	48	96	(Japan) Omron Corporation
21	RB	Aiko Hayafune	23 January 1980 (aged 33)	1.67 m	95	276	(Japan) MIE violet' IRIS
22	GK	Kaori Fujima	6 July 1982 (aged 31)	1.73 m	54	0	(Japan) Omron Corporation
24	RB	Nozomi Hara	9 March 1991 (aged 22)	1.70 m	9	22	(Japan) MIE violet' IRIS
26	CB	Anna Kawamura	26 October 1991 (aged 22)	1.67 m			(Japan) Tokai University
28	P	Shiori Nagata	24 October 1987 (aged 26)	1.71 m	29	28	(Japan) Omron Corporation

=== Serbia ===
A preliminary squad was announced on 13 November 2013 while a 19-player list was published on 1 December 2013.

Head coach: Saša Bošković

No.	Pos.	Name	Date of birth (age)	Height	App.	Goals	Club
3	RW	Katarina Krpež	2 May 1988 (aged 25)	1.67 m	74	145	(Slovenia) RK Krim
4	RB	Jelena Popović	4 September 1984 (aged 29)	1.71 m	90	146	(France) HBC Nantes
7	CB	Andrea Lekić	6 September 1987 (aged 26)	1.78 m	74	367	(North Macedonia) ŽRK Vardar
9	RB	Jelena Živković	6 July 1991 (aged 22)	1.84 m	35	35	(Croatia) RK Podravka Koprivnica
11	LB	Sanja Damnjanović	25 May 1987 (aged 26)	1.77 m	87	319	(Denmark) Viborg HK
15	LB	Jelena Erić	12 October 1979 (aged 34)	1.80 m	76	271	(Russia) HC Astrakhanochka
16	GK	Jovana Risović	7 October 1993 (aged 20)	1.70 m	24	0	(Serbia) ŽRK Radnički Belgrade
17	P	Sanja Rajović	18 May 1981 (aged 32)	1.72 m	56	86	(Croatia) RK Lokomotiva Zagreb
21	LW	Svetlana Ognjenović	26 January 1981 (aged 32)	1.68 m	87	200	(France) Metz Handball
26	LB	Biljana Filipović	12 January 1986 (aged 27)	1.89 m	25	52	(France) Nice Handball
27	GK	Katarina Tomašević	6 February 1984 (aged 29)	1.79 m	54	0	(France) HBC Nantes
30	LW	Jelena Nišavić	17 September 1980 (aged 33)	1.68 m	92	120	(Serbia) RK Jagodina
31	RW	Ivana Milošević	11 June 1982 (aged 31)	1.68 m			(Serbia) ŽRK Radnički Belgrade
33	LB	Jovana Stoiljković	30 September 1988 (aged 25)	1.82 m	25	36	(France) Le Havre
71	CB	Kristina Liščević	20 October 1989 (aged 24)	1.73 m	32	32	(France) Metz Handball
72	P	Dragana Cvijić	15 March 1990 (aged 23)	1.85 m	53	140	(Montenegro) ŽRK Budućnost
83	P	Marija Lojpur	10 August 1983 (aged 30)	1.78 m	24	36	(North Macedonia) ŽRK Vardar
99	RB	Marina Dmitrović	25 March 1985 (aged 28)	1.82 m			(North Macedonia) ŽRK Vardar

== Group C ==
=== Angola ===
The squad was announced on 7 December 2013.

Head coach: Vivaldo Eduardo

No.	Pos.	Name	Date of birth (age)	Height	App.	Goals	Club
1	GK	Teresa Almeida	5 May 1988 (aged 25)	1.81 m			(Angola) Petro de Luanda
2	LW	Joelma Viegas	15 October 1986 (aged 27)	1.70 m	24	40	(Angola) Primeiro de Agosto
3	P	Anastácia Sibo	27 May 1982 (aged 31)	1.84 m	35	29	(Angola) Petro de Luanda
4	CB	Rossana Quitongo	15 September 1990 (aged 23)	1.72 m	10	8	(Angola) Primeiro de Agosto
5	RB	Magda Cazanga	28 May 1991 (aged 22)	1.72 m	15	22	(Angola) Petro de Luanda
6	RB	Liliana Paixão	3 March 1988 (aged 25)	1.82 m	0	0	(Angola) Petro de Luanda
8	CB	Lurdes Monteiro	11 July 1984 (aged 29)	1.70 m	0	0	(Angola) Primeiro de Agosto
9	RW	Isabel Guialo	8 April 1990 (aged 23)	1.68 m	24	30	(Angola) Primeiro de Agosto
10	P	Albertina Kassoma	12 June 1996 (aged 17)	1.92 m	14	39	(Angola) Primeiro de Agosto
11	CB	Luísa Kiala	25 January 1982 (aged 31)	1.79 m	91	164	(Angola) Petro de Luanda
12	LB	Marta Santos	25 December 1988 (aged 24)	1.70 m	12	6	(Angola) Petro de Luanda
13	LB	Lisandra Salvador	6 August 1990 (aged 23)	1.72 m	12	8	(Angola) Primeiro de Agosto
14	RW	Natália Bernardo	25 December 1986 (aged 26)	1.69 m	58	116	(Angola) Petro de Luanda
16	GK	Maria Pedro	29 December 1982 (aged 30)	1.72 m	68	0	(Angola) Petro de Luanda
18	LB	Marcelina Kiala	9 November 1979 (aged 34)	1.80 m	89	246	(Angola) Petro de Luanda
20	GK	Cristina Branco	15 March 1985 (aged 28)	1.74 m	43	0	(Angola) Primeiro de Agosto

=== Argentina ===
The squad was announced on 22 November 2013.

Head coach: Eduardo Peruchena

No.	Pos.	Name	Date of birth (age)	Height	App.	Goals	Club
1	GK	Marisol Carratu	15 July 1986 (aged 27)	1.74 m	80	1	(Argentina) Ferro Oeste
2	CB	Noelia Sala	4 March 1988 (aged 25)	1.71 m	30	23	(Argentina) Dorrego Handball
4	RB	Lucía Haro	21 August 1986 (aged 27)	1.78 m	42	65	(Argentina) Unión Eléctrica
5	P	Manuela Pizzo	13 November 1991 (aged 22)	1.77 m	18	22	(Brazil) AD Blumenau
6	P	Magdalena Decilio	23 March 1983 (aged 30)	1.73 m	89	110	(Argentina) Estudiantes
8	LB	Amelia Belotti	17 November 1988 (aged 25)	1.70 m	36	65	(Argentina) Italia Handball
9	RW	Luciana Mendoza	14 March 1990 (aged 23)	1.72 m	50	78	(Brazil) AD Blumenau
10	CB	Victoria Crivelli	30 September 1990 (aged 23)	1.76 m	30	40	(Argentina) Ferro Oeste
11	LB	Antonella Gambino	26 March 1990 (aged 23)	1.64 m	15	25	(Argentina) Argentinos Juniors
13	LW	Macarena Alonso	13 January 1993 (aged 20)	1.69 m	10	20	(Argentina) Sedalo
14	LB	Valeria Bianchi	16 September 1985 (aged 28)	1.70 m	45	50	(Argentina) NS Lujan
15	P	Antonela Mena	28 March 1988 (aged 25)	1.82 m	60	60	(Argentina) CID Moreno
16	GK	Nadia Bordon	11 August 1988 (aged 25)	1.70 m	17	0	(Italy) PDO Salerno
17	LB	Natalia Vico	10 November 1992 (aged 21)	1.75 m	10	6	(Argentina) UNCuyo Handball
19	RW	Rocio Ocanto	6 September 1992 (aged 21)	1.71 m	10	15	(Argentina) NS Lujan
22	CB	Elke Karsten	15 May 1995 (aged 18)	1.75 m	5	14	(Argentina) AACF Quilmes

=== Norway ===
The squad was announced on 14 November 2013.

Head coach: Thorir Hergeirsson

No.	Pos.	Name	Date of birth (age)	Height	App.	Goals	Club
2	LB	Mari Molid	8 August 1990 (aged 23)	1.78 m	60	39	(Norway) Levanger Handball
4	CB	Stine Bredal Oftedal	25 September 1991 (aged 22)	1.68 m	70	104	(France) Issy-Paris Hand
5	LB	Ida Alstad	13 June 1985 (aged 28)	1.72 m	100	256	(Denmark) Team Tvis Holstebro
6	P	Heidi Løke	12 December 1982 (aged 30)	1.73 m	126	444	(Hungary) Győri Audi ETO KC
7	RB	Tonje Nøstvold	7 May 1985 (aged 28)	1.78 m	172	391	(Norway) Byåsen HE
8	CB	Karoline Dyhre Breivang	10 May 1980 (aged 33)	1.72 m	280	455	(Norway) Larvik HK
9	P	Isabel Blanco	10 May 1979 (aged 34)	1.75 m	79	156	(Norway) Larvik HK
11	CB	Anja Hammerseng-Edin	5 February 1983 (aged 30)	1.73 m	52	125	(Norway) Larvik HK
12	GK	Silje Solberg	16 June 1990 (aged 23)	1.78 m	40	0	(Norway) Stabæk IF
15	RB	Linn Jørum Sulland	15 July 1984 (aged 29)	1.78 m	147	459	(Norway) Larvik HK
16	GK	Katrine Lunde	30 March 1980 (aged 33)	1.80 m	231	3	(Hungary) Győri Audi ETO KC
17	LB	Veronica Kristiansen	10 July 1990 (aged 23)	1.75 m	17	42	(Norway) Glassverket IF
18	RW	Linn-Kristin Riegelhuth Koren	1 August 1984 (aged 29)	1.75 m	240	886	(Norway) Larvik HK
22	RB	Nora Mørk	5 April 1991 (aged 22)	1.67 m	22	68	(Norway) Larvik HK
23	LW	Camilla Herrem	8 October 1986 (aged 27)	1.69 m	130	315	(Norway) Byåsen HE
24	LW	Sanna Solberg	16 June 1990 (aged 23)	1.78 m	26	56	(Norway) Stabæk IF

=== Paraguay ===
Head coach: Antonio Bordon

No.	Pos.	Name	Date of birth (age)	Height	App.	Goals	Club
1	GK	Alicia Villalba	28 February 1989 (aged 24)	1.73 m	80	1	(Paraguay) Nueva Estrella
3	P	Sabrina Fiore	17 April 1996 (aged 17)	1.78 m	60	300	(Paraguay) Castro Alves Handball
4	W	Alana Pedrozo	7 August 1992 (aged 21)	1.70 m	18	30	(Paraguay) San Jose Handball
6	W	María Gómez	22 January 1984 (aged 29)	1.67 m	15	20	(Paraguay) Universidad Americana
7	LB	Georginna Battaglia	15 February 1995 (aged 18)	1.65 m	15	26	(Paraguay) San Jose Handball
8	P	Rebeca Bordon	26 July 1994 (aged 19)	1.70 m	15	20	(Paraguay) Nueva Estrella
9	CB	Marizza Faría	20 August 1983 (aged 30)	1.70 m	80	640	(Spain) CB Mar Alicante
11	P	Myrian Rodríguez	13 February 1989 (aged 24)	1.75 m	25	15	(Paraguay) Nueva Estrella
13	RW	Alexia Cáceres	31 January 1995 (aged 18)	1.70 m	15	38	(Paraguay) Nueva Estrella
14	B	Leysa Beggan	12 December 1992 (aged 20)	1.70 m	10	6	(Paraguay) Nueva Estrella
15	B	Ana Acuña	5 May 1994 (aged 19)	1.83 m	70	100	(Paraguay) Nueva Estrella
16	GK	Analia Yaryes	9 May 1993 (aged 20)	1.72 m	10	0	(Paraguay) San Jose Handball
17	W	Kamila Rolon	5 June 1994 (aged 19)	1.65 m	16	30	(Paraguay) Nueva Estrella
25	B	Pilar Frutos	27 August 1991 (aged 22)	1.65 m	0	0	(Paraguay) Santa Elena Handball

=== Poland ===
The squad was announced on 27 November 2013.

Head coach: Kim Rasmussen

No.	Pos.	Name	Date of birth (age)	Height	App.	Goals	Club
1	GK	Małgorzata Gapska	3 September 1983 (aged 30)	1.76 m	64	1	(Poland) Vistal Gdynia
4	P	Monika Stachowska	2 January 1981 (aged 32)	1.79 m	71	103	(Poland) SPR Pogoń Szczecin
5	RB	Iwona Niedźwiedź	22 July 1979 (aged 34)	1.77 m	146	429	(Poland) Vistal Gdynia
6	CB	Karolina Siódmiak	14 September 1981 (aged 32)	1.78 m	54	148	(France) Fleury Loiret HB
11	LW	Kinga Grzyb	12 January 1982 (aged 31)	1.68 m	176	341	(Poland) EB Start Elbląg
14	CB	Karolina Kudłacz	17 January 1985 (aged 28)	1.77 m	111	605	(Germany) HC Leipzig
21	RW	Katarzyna Koniuszaniec	10 January 1985 (aged 28)	1.77 m	36	79	(Poland) EB Start Elbląg
28	LB	Alina Wojtas	21 March 1987 (aged 26)	1.91 m	46	122	(Poland) SPR Lublin SSA
29	CB	Karolina Semeniuk-Olchawa	24 October 1983 (aged 30)	1.74 m	27	66	(Poland) MKS Zagłębie Lubin
32	LB	Karolina Szwed-Orneborg	23 April 1989 (aged 24)	1.83 m	35	43	(Germany) HC Leipzig
33	RW	Monika Migała	1 May 1987 (aged 26)	1.68 m	42	73	(Poland) KPR Ruch Chorzów
40	GK	Anna Wysokińska	17 June 1987 (aged 26)	1.82 m	22	0	(Germany) SG BBM Bietigheim
41	LB	Małgorzata Stasiak	5 November 1988 (aged 25)	1.77 m	28	63	(Poland) SPR Pogoń Szczecin
55	LW	Agnieszka Jochymek	10 September 1985 (aged 28)	1.70 m	44	61	(Poland) MKS Zagłębie Lubin
77	P	Patrycja Kulwińska	31 March 1989 (aged 24)	1.78 m	60	88	(Poland) Vistal Gdynia
89	RB	Kinga Byzdra	9 January 1989 (aged 24)	1.81 m	94	215	(Montenegro) ŽRK Budućnost

=== Spain ===
The squad was announced on 15 November 2013.

Head coach: Jorge Dueñas

No.	Pos.	Name	Date of birth (age)	Height	App.	Goals	Club
1	GK	Cristina González	6 August 1983 (aged 30)	1.80 m	126	0	(Spain) Club León
2	RW	Marta López	4 February 1990 (aged 23)	1.68 m	36	80	(France) Fleury Loiret HB
4	RW	Carmen Martín	29 May 1988 (aged 25)	1.69 m	131	415	(Slovenia) RK Krim
7	LB	Beatriz Fernández	19 March 1985 (aged 28)	1.80 m	149	330	(France) Fleury Loiret HB
9	RB	Marta Mangué	23 April 1983 (aged 30)	1.74 m	240	884	(France) Fleury Loiret HB
10	CB	Macarena Aguilar	12 March 1985 (aged 28)	1.74 m	171	502	(Denmark) Randers HK
11	CB	Nuria Benzal	3 April 1985 (aged 28)	1.70 m	76	112	(Hungary) Fehérvár KC
12	GK	Silvia Navarro	20 March 1979 (aged 34)	1.68 m	93	2	(Spain) BM Remudas
13	RW	Jessica Alonso	20 September 1983 (aged 30)	1.75 m	90	194	(France) Le Havre AC
14	P	Elisabeth Chávez	17 November 1990 (aged 23)	1.92 m	107	42	(France) Nice Handball
17	LW	Elisabeth Pinedo	13 May 1981 (aged 32)	1.74 m	143	318	(Spain) BM Bera Bera
18	P	Begoña Fernández	22 March 1980 (aged 33)	1.80 m	172	372	(North Macedonia) ŽRK Vardar
25	RB	Nerea Pena	13 December 1989 (aged 23)	1.76 m	52	146	(Hungary) Ferencvárosi TC
27	LB	Lara González Ortega	22 February 1992 (aged 21)	1.83 m	8	10	(France) Metz Handball
30	RB	Patricia Elorza	8 April 1984 (aged 29)	1.80 m	71	43	(Spain) BM Bera Bera
35	LW	Naiara Egozkue Extremado	21 October 1983 (aged 30)	1.74 m	14	27	(Germany) Bayer Leverkusen
86	LB	Alexandrina Barbosa	5 May 1986 (aged 27)	1.76 m	19	97	(Germany) Thüringer HC

== Group D ==
=== Australia ===
Head coach: Jason Hoppner

No.	Pos.	Name	Date of birth (age)	Height	App.	Goals	Club
1	GK	Jemima Harbort	4 September 1987 (aged 26)	1.80 m	22	0	(Australia) Northern Panthers
2	LB	Shelley Roy	2 August 1974 (aged 39)	1.75 m	54	236	(Australia) Sydney University HC
3	P	Olivia Doherty	6 January 1982 (aged 31)	1.65 m	19	20	(Australia) Melbourne HC
4	LW	Aminta Thomas	31 October 1990 (aged 23)	1.75 m	31	59	(Australia) Sydney University HC
5	P	Kristina Lindblom	20 August 1992 (aged 21)	1.69 m	2	5	(Sweden) Ludvika Handball Club
6	RB	Daniela Cook	16 March 1978 (aged 35)	1.76 m	10	30	(Australia) Sydney University HC
7	RW	Solveig Sørensen	9 August 1982 (aged 31)	1.69 m	26	80	(Denmark) Team Haderslev
8	LB	Sally Potocki	11 February 1989 (aged 24)	1.78 m	35	105	(Germany) Dortmund Handball
11	CB	Emma van Bussel	2 May 1989 (aged 24)	1.65 m	12	11	(Australia) Sydney University HC
12	GK	Catherine Kent	15 January 1981 (aged 32)	1.72 m	44	1	(France) Narbonne Handball
14	CB	Madeleine McAfee	5 February 1993 (aged 20)	1.72 m	30	65	(Australia) Logan Wizards HC
15	CB	Vanja Smiljanic	27 January 1990 (aged 23)	1.70 m	19	87	(Australia) Melbourne HC
16	LB	Rosalie Boyd	21 October 1987 (aged 26)	1.78 m	37	56	(Australia) Griffith University HC
17	LW	Victoria Brunsberg	2 April 1991 (aged 22)	1.72 m	20	84	(Australia) Sydney University HC
61	LW	Lilly Bentwitch	14 November 1983 (aged 30)	1.65 m	17	31	(Australia) Harbourside Handball
77	P	Ana Meded	19 March 1996 (aged 17)	1.78 m	2	2	(Australia) Melbourne HC

=== Czech Republic ===
The squad was announced on 5 December 2013.

Head coach: Jan Bašný

No.	Pos.	Name	Date of birth (age)	Height	App.	Goals	Club
3	RW	Jana Knedlíková	22 June 1989 (aged 24)	1.67 m	46	90	(Czech Republic) DHC Slavia Prague
5	CB	Kateřina Keclíková	26 June 1986 (aged 27)	1.71 m	47	59	(Czech Republic) DHC Slavia Prague
7	LW	Romana Chrenková	30 June 1987 (aged 26)	1.66 m	81	296	(Czech Republic) HC Veselí
8	LB	Pavla Poznarová	26 September 1986 (aged 27)	1.81 m	98	202	(Czech Republic) DHC Sokol Poruba
9	LW	Kristýna Salčáková	13 August 1987 (aged 26)	1.65 m	65	80	(Czech Republic) DHK Zora Olomouc
10	CB	Petra Růčková	8 February 1989 (aged 24)	1.74 m	69	52	(Czech Republic) DHK Baník Most
11	CB	Hana Kutlvašrová	28 September 1989 (aged 24)	1.80 m	46	61	(Czech Republic) DHC Slavia Prague
12	GK	Barbora Raníková	12 March 1985 (aged 28)	1.81 m	67	0	(France) Metz Handball
13	RB	Klára Černá	29 January 1985 (aged 28)	1.74 m	63	188	(France) HBC Nîmes
14	P	Petra Vítková	18 August 1979 (aged 34)	1.76 m	208	337	(Czech Republic) DHK Banik Most
15	RW	Michaela Hrbková	14 July 1987 (aged 26)	1.70 m	86	160	(Czech Republic) DHC Sokol Poruba
16	GK	Lucie Satrapová	3 July 1989 (aged 24)	1.83 m			(Czech Republic) DHC Slavia Prague
18	CB	Iveta Luzumová	3 April 1989 (aged 24)	1.75 m	46	155	(Germany) Thüringer HC
19	LB	Helena Štěrbová	5 April 1988 (aged 25)	1.80 m	42	103	(France) Toulon Handball
22	RB	Martina Crhová	17 June 1988 (aged 25)	1.76 m	36	36	(Sweden) IFK Kristianstad
24	P	Dominika Selucká	13 December 1987 (aged 25)	1.75 m	28	14	(Czech Republic) DHC Slavia Prague
30	GK	Dominika Müllnerová	26 March 1992 (aged 21)	1.70 m	7	0	(Czech Republic) DHK Banik Most

=== Germany ===
The squad was announced on 13 November 2013.

Head coach: Heine Jensen

No.	Pos.	Name	Date of birth (age)	Height	App.	Goals	Club
1	GK	Jana Krause	10 June 1987 (aged 26)	1.88 m	25	0	(Germany) Thüringer HC
2	RW	Marlene Zapf	6 January 1990 (aged 23)	1.70 m	24	73	(Germany) Bayer Leverkusen
5	LB	Saskia Lang	19 December 1986 (aged 26)	1.79 m	31	22	(Germany) HC Leipzig
7	LW	Natalie Augsburg	15 November 1983 (aged 30)	1.75 m	57	107	(Germany) HC Leipzig
9	P	Wiebke Kethorn	10 August 1985 (aged 28)	1.68 m	28	28	(Germany) VfL Oldenburg
10	CB	Anna Loerper	18 November 1984 (aged 29)	1.64 m	174	192	(Germany) VfL Oldenburg
14	LB	Ewgenija Minevskaja	31 October 1992 (aged 21)	1.70 m	32	0	(Germany) TuS Metzingen
15	CB	Kim Naidzinavicius	6 April 1991 (aged 22)	1.81 m	19	19	(Germany) Bayer Leverkusen
16	GK	Clara Woltering	2 March 1983 (aged 30)	1.78 m	156	0	(Montenegro) ŽRK Budućnost
17	RW	Anne Hubinger	31 July 1993 (aged 20)	1.85 m	16	22	(Germany) HC Leipzig
18	LB	Laura Steinbach	2 August 1985 (aged 28)	1.81 m	90	179	(Hungary) Ferencvárosi TC
19	RB	Christine Beier	12 December 1983 (aged 29)	1.78 m	43	59	(Germany) Spreefüxxe Berlin
20	P	Anja Althaus	3 September 1982 (aged 31)	1.74 m	214	467	(Germany) Thüringer HC
21	LB	Nadja Nadgornaja	22 September 1988 (aged 25)	1.84 m	42	162	(Germany) Thüringer HC
22	RB	Susann Müller	26 May 1988 (aged 25)	1.86 m	59	148	(Germany) HC Leipzig
26	LB	Angie Geschke	24 May 1985 (aged 28)	1.77 m	48	55	(Germany) VfL Oldenburg

=== Hungary ===
The squad was announced on 29 November 2013.

Head coach: János Hajdu

No.	Pos.	Name	Date of birth (age)	Height	App.	Goals	Club
2	LB	Szandra Zácsik	22 April 1990 (aged 23)	1.83 m			(Hungary) Ferencvárosi TC
5	LB	Krisztina Triscsuk	17 July 1985 (aged 28)	1.79 m	6	4	(Hungary) Érdi VSE
6	LW	Orsolya Vérten	22 July 1982 (aged 31)	1.70 m	140	407	(Hungary) Ferencvárosi TC
7	CB	Zita Szucsánszki	22 May 1987 (aged 26)	1.72 m	91	300	(Hungary) Ferencvárosi TC
8	CB	Anikó Kovacsics	29 August 1991 (aged 22)	1.70 m			(Hungary) Győri Audi ETO KC
9	LW	Melinda Vincze	12 November 1983 (aged 30)	1.74 m	64	89	(Hungary) Dunaújvárosi KKA
10	LB	Anita Bulath	20 September 1983 (aged 30)	1.77 m	71	168	(Hungary) Dunaújvárosi KKA
12	GK	Orsolya Herr	23 November 1984 (aged 29)	1.81 m	132	0	(Hungary) Győri Audi ETO KC
13	CB	Anita Görbicz	13 May 1983 (aged 30)	1.73 m	190	893	(Hungary) Győri Audi ETO KC
18	P	Piroska Szamoránsky	9 July 1986 (aged 27)	1.71 m	110	242	(Hungary) Ferencvárosi TC
20	RB	Viktória Rédei Soós	26 July 1985 (aged 28)	1.76 m	26	54	(Hungary) Győri Audi ETO KC
21	GK	Éva Kiss	10 July 1987 (aged 26)	1.89 m	29	0	(Hungary) Fehérvár KC
22	RW	Bernadett Bódi	9 March 1986 (aged 27)	1.75 m	85	130	(Hungary) Győri Audi ETO KC
23	LB	Klára Szekeres	1 December 1987 (aged 26)	1.86 m	51	22	(Hungary) Érdi VSE
27	P	Anita Cifra	6 August 1989 (aged 24)	1.80 m	13	31	(Hungary) Ferencvárosi TC
83	RW	Mónika Kovacsicz	20 November 1983 (aged 30)	1.71 m	51	79	(Hungary) Ferencvárosi TC
87	RB	Zsuzsanna Tomori	18 June 1987 (aged 26)	1.86 m	112	286	(Hungary) Ferencvárosi TC

=== Romania ===
The final squad of 17 players was announced on 4 December 2013.

Head coach: Gheorghe Tadici

No.	Pos.	Name	Date of birth (age)	Height	App.	Goals	Club
2	RB	Aneta Pîrvuț	22 June 1989 (aged 24)	1.66 m	4	6	(Romania) HCM Baia Mare
4	LW	Nicoleta Dincă	2 July 1988 (aged 25)	1.70 m	21	25	(Romania) S.C.M. Craiova
6	P	Crina Pintea	3 April 1990 (aged 23)	1.86 m	16	24	(Romania) HC Zalău
7	RW	Adriana Nechita	14 November 1983 (aged 29)	1.72 m	121	283	(Romania) HCM Baia Mare
8	LB	Cristina Neagu	26 August 1988 (aged 25)	1.80 m	119	473	(Montenegro) ŽRK Budućnost
9	CB	Aurelia Brădeanu	5 May 1979 (aged 34)	1.80 m	241	604	(Romania) ASC Corona Brașov
10	RB	Adriana Ţăcălie	29 January 1989 (aged 24)	1.80 m	31	56	(Romania) ASC Corona Brașov
11	LB	Gabriela Perianu	20 June 1994 (aged 19)	1.87 m	11	13	(Romania) HC Dunărea Brăila
13	CB	Luciana Marin	13 October 1988 (aged 25)	1.76 m	7	12	(Romania) HCM Baia Mare
15	LW	Valentina Ardean-Elisei	5 June 1982 (aged 31)	1.75 m	189	763	(Romania) CSM Cetate Deva
16	GK	Denisa Dedu	27 September 1994 (aged 19)	1.81 m			(Romania) ASC Corona Brașov
17	P	Georgiana Ciuciulete	23 April 1987 (aged 26)	1.75 m	12	18	(Romania) HC Zalău
21	GK	Talida Tolnai	21 August 1979 (aged 34)	1.87 m	111	1	(Slovenia) RK Krim
30	GK	Paula Ungureanu	30 March 1980 (aged 33)	1.81 m	126	2	(Romania) HCM Baia Mare
77	P	Oana Manea	18 April 1985 (aged 28)	1.77 m	160	332	(Slovenia) RK Krim
89	RW	Laura Chiper	21 August 1989 (aged 24)	1.73 m	7	4	(Romania) ASC Corona Brașov
93	LB	Eliza Buceschi	1 August 1993 (aged 20)	1.79 m	16	15	(Romania) HCM Baia Mare

=== Tunisia ===
Head coach: Paulo de Moura

No.	Pos.	Name	Date of birth (age)	Height	App.	Goals	Club
3	RB	Nesrine Daoula	9 April 1990 (aged 23)	1.72 m	62	141	(France) Lomme Handball
6	P	Asma Elghaoui	29 August 1991 (aged 22)	1.70 m	69	330	(France) HBC Nimes
7	RB	Saida Rejeb	21 March 1994 (aged 19)	1.74 m	16	27	(Tunisia) Olympique de Gafsa
9	RW	Fatma Sfar-Ben-Chker	20 March 1994 (aged 19)	1.70 m	48	155	(Tunisia) ASF Mahdia
10	LB	Raja Toumi	3 April 1978 (aged 35)	1.79 m	214	918	(Norway) Byåsen HE
12	GK	Echraf Abdallah	14 January 1987 (aged 26)	1.81 m			(Tunisia) Club Africain
15	LW	Refka Hlaili	18 April 1990 (aged 23)	1.69 m	41	81	(Tunisia) ASF Sahel
16	GK	Fadia Omrani	27 February 1984 (aged 29)	1.71 m	49	0	(Tunisia) ASE Ariana
17	RB	Ouided Kilani	15 June 1982 (aged 31)	1.76 m	163	235	(France) Colombelles Handball
20	CB	Mouna Chebbah	8 July 1982 (aged 31)	1.70 m	209	875	(Denmark) Viborg HK
21	CB	Sondes Hachana	7 September 1996 (aged 17)	1.72 m	20	58	(Tunisia) ASF Teboulba
22	LB	Maroua Dhaouadi	22 May 1992 (aged 21)	1.75 m	60	287	(France) HBC Nantes
29	P	Faten Yahiaoui	1 May 1985 (aged 28)	1.71 m	12	2	(France) HBC Brest
30	LB	Ines Jaouadi	15 September 1989 (aged 24)	1.83 m	78	198	(Tunisia) ASF Sahel
44	P	Manel Kouki	4 February 1988 (aged 25)	1.80 m	60	142	(Tunisia) ASE Ariana
85	GK	Noura Ben Slama	23 February 1985 (aged 28)	1.76 m	25	0	(France) C.A. Béglais
