= 2014 African Women's Handball Championship squads =

This article displays the squads for the 2014 African Women's Handball Championship. Each team consists of 16 players.

== Algeria ==
Head coach: Karim Achour

No.	Pos.	Name	Date of birth (age)	Height	App.	Goals	Club
2		Najah Souli	21 July 1988 (aged 25)	1.72 m			(France) Bergerac PP
5		Nadia Bellakdar	16 April 1991 (aged 22)	1.69 m			(France) Noisy-le-Grand
7	P	Ratiba Hasnaoui	4 March 1987 (aged 26)	1.89 m			(Algeria) HBC El Biar
8	LB	Souad Titou	14 February 1986 (aged 27)	1.84 m			(France) Lomme Lille
9		Soraya Tebib	16 January 1982 (aged 32)	1.74 m			(France) Val de Boutonne
10		Fatiha Iberraken	3 April 1986 (aged 27)	1.68 m			(Algeria) HBC El Biar
11	RW	Amel Ait Ahmed	25 September 1989 (aged 24)	1.82 m			(Algeria) HBC El Biar
12	GK	Samia Sehabi	9 January 1981 (aged 33)	1.73 m			(Algeria) GS Pétroliers
14	RB	Lamia Izem	3 September 1980 (aged 33)	1.78 m			(Algeria) GS Pétroliers
15		Imene Affar					(Algeria) HBC El Biar
16	GK	Fatima Boussora	3 July 1983 (aged 30)	1.74 m			(Algeria) HBC El Biar
17	LB	Sihem Hemissi	1 June 1985 (aged 28)	1.89 m			(Algeria) GS Pétroliers
18	RB	Nabila Tizi	20 March 1984 (aged 29)	1.85 m			(France) Brest Bretagne
19	P	Rima Khelil	21 March 1989 (aged 24)	1.70 m			(Algeria) RIJ Alger
20	LB	Souhila Benaicha	11 May 1988 (aged 25)	1.82 m			(Algeria) HBC El Biar

== Angola ==
Head coach: Vivaldo Eduardo

No.	Pos.	Name	Date of birth (age)	Height	App.	Goals	Club
1	GK	Teresa Almeida	5 April 1988 (aged 25)	1.82 m	26	0	(Angola) Petro de Luanda
2	LW	Joelma Viegas	15 October 1986 (aged 27)	1.68 m	0	0	(Angola) 1º de Agosto
3	RW	Juliana Machado	6 November 1994 (aged 19)	1.70 m	19	43	(Angola) 1º de Agosto
4	RB	Wuta Dombaxe	5 April 1986 (aged 27)	1.73 m	16	50	(Angola) 1º de Agosto
5	RB	Magda Cazanga	28 May 1991 (aged 22)	1.84 m	15	22	(Angola) Petro de Luanda
6	P	Albertina Kassoma	12 June 1996 (aged 17)	1.92 m			(Angola) 1º de Agosto
7	RW	Carolina Morais	13 April 1986 (aged 27)	1.60 m			(Angola) 1º de Agosto
8	CB	Lurdes Monteiro	11 July 1984 (aged 29)	1.70 m	16	46	(Angola) 1º de Agosto
9	LB	Isabel Guialo	8 April 1990 (aged 23)	1.72 m	27	42	(Angola) 1º de Agosto
10	LB	Isabel Fernandes	5 June 1985 (aged 28)	1.80 m			(Angola) Petro de Luanda
11	LB	Luísa Kiala	25 January 1982 (aged 32)	1.72 m	98	180	(Angola) Petro de Luanda
12	LW	Marta Santos	25 December 1988 (aged 25)	1.69 m	19	12	(Angola) Petro de Luanda
14	CB	Natália Bernardo	25 December 1986 (aged 27)	1.70 m	67	149	(Angola) 1º de Agosto
15	RB	Azenaide Carlos	14 June 1990 (aged 23)	1.75 m	44	130	(Angola) Petro de Luanda
16	GK	Maria Pedro	29 December 1982 (aged 31)	1.72 m			(Angola) Petro de Luanda
18	LB	Marcelina Kiala	9 November 1979 (aged 34)	1.80 m			(Angola) Petro de Luanda

== Cameroon ==
Head coach: Jean Marie Zambo

No.	Pos.	Name	Date of birth (age)	Height	App.	Goals	Club
1	GK	Isabelle Mben
2	W	Anne Kaldjob
3	P	Pasma Chouapouognigni	21 December 1991 (aged 22)	1.84 m
4	W	Louisette Nge	8 February 1987 (aged 26)
5	B	Annie Cecile Mben	6 August 1986 (aged 27)
7	CB	Vanessa Djepmou	18 June 1990 (aged 23)
8	CB	Melissa Awu	12 October 1991 (aged 22)
9	LB	Genevieve Melingui
11	W	Hermine Ngo	22 November 1979 (aged 34)
12	GK	Berthe Abiabankon	7 October 1988 (aged 25)
13	P	Pauline Mballa
14	CB	Marceline Megouen
15	B	Anne Michelle Essam	6 January 1988 (aged 26)
16	P	Jasmine Youtchoum
17	P	Diane Yimga	27 April 1992 (aged 21)
22	GK	Gisele Tsanze

== Congo ==
Head coach: Jean Patrice Pahapa

No.	Pos.	Name	Date of birth (age)	Height	App.	Goals	Club
1	GK	Sandrine Oyoukou	24 January 1984 (aged 30)	1.65 m
2		Sandra Ndagnaka
3	CB	Sylvie Mpinoba
5	RB	Chantal Okomba	19 September 1979 (aged 34)	1.64 m
7	LW	Suzanne Mambou	25 April 1992 (aged 21)	1.67 m
8	P	Patience Louoba	16 May 1991 (aged 22)	1.80 m
9	LB	Alphonsine Ngoulou	12 June 1995 (aged 18)	1.80 m
10	RW	Jocelyne Mavoungou	22 September 1986 (aged 27)
11		Nicosie Akouala
12	GK	Amelia Okombi	15 February 1980 (aged 33)	1.70 m
13		Sandrelle Itoua	7 April 1984 (aged 29)	1.65 m
14	P	Aubine Ngamabana	1 March 1980 (aged 33)	1.75 m
15	LB	Prisca Madzou	19 November 1984 (aged 29)	1.70 m
16		Sylvanie Okandze
17	RW	Grace Zoubabela	17 March 1993 (aged 20)	1.68 m
18		Mamie Itoua

== DR Congo ==
Head coach: Celestin Mpoua

No.	Pos.	Name	Date of birth (age)	Height	App.	Goals	Club
1	GK	Louise Makubanza	20 October 1992 (aged 21)	1.80 m			(Angola) 1º de Agosto
2	RB	Jumelle Okoko	26 December 1984 (aged 29)	1.68 m			(France) Blavozy RB
3	CB	Grace Shokkos	4 August 1992 (aged 21)	1.73 m			(France) Poitiers Handball
4	CB	Consolate Feza	23 March 1985 (aged 28)	1.68 m			(Democratic Republic of the Congo) Mikishi Lubumbashi
5	RW	Olga Milemba	27 July 1984 (aged 29)	1.69 m			(Democratic Republic of the Congo) Héritage Kinshasa
6	LW	Clémence Matutu	26 April 1992 (aged 21)	1.59 m			(France) Poitiers Handball
7	P	Apopie Lusamba	20 May 1985 (aged 28)	1.68 m			(France) Gagny
8	CB	Constance Louoba	14 June 1971 (aged 42)	1.68 m			(France) Blavozy RB
9	LB	Christianne Mwasesa	12 March 1985 (aged 28)	1.75 m			(Angola) 1º de Agosto
10	P	Virginie Mamba	5 December 1980 (aged 33)	1.80 m			(Democratic Republic of the Congo) Héritage Kinshasa
13	LB	Lydia Musonda Kasangala	6 May 1988 (aged 25)	1.88 m			(Democratic Republic of the Congo) Héritage Kinshasa
14	LB	Carole Babala	14 June 1989 (aged 24)	1.70 m
16	GK	Bibiche Kabamba	31 July 1981 (aged 32)	1.84 m			(Democratic Republic of the Congo) Héritage Kinshasa
17	LB	Julie Betu	25 August 1995 (aged 18)	1.63 m
18		Sandrine Kibamba	5 June 1979 (aged 34)	1.69 m
20	P	Melissa Maboulou	20 August 1991 (aged 22)	1.74 m

== Guinea ==
Head coach: Kevin Decaux

No.	Pos.	Name	Date of birth (age)	Height	App.	Goals	Club
		Maimouna Fofana
		Maimouna Cisse
		Fatoumata Soumah
		Fanta Diaby
		Mariame Bangoura
		Aissata Camara
		Mariama Ndiaye
		Aramata Diarra
		Dalla Sangare
		Halimatou Diallo
		Gnaraba Keita
		Kadiatou Camara
		Bintou Diallo
		Mariame Fofana

== Senegal ==
Head coach: Cheick Seck

No.	Pos.	Name	Date of birth (age)	Height	App.	Goals	Club
1		Rosaline Correa
5		Amina Sankare
6		Fatou Seye Ndeye
7	RW	Niacalin Kante		1.68 m
8		Rokhaya Benga
9	LB	Hadja Cisse	7 March 1991 (aged 22)
10		Haby Badiane	19 April 1992 (aged 21)
11	B	Koudiedji Ba	11 May 1990 (aged 23)	1.67 m
15		Maimouna Kanoute
16		Marama Sane
18		Ndeye Benga
19	LW	Adja Paye	26 September 1989 (aged 24)
24	B	Penda Sylla	3 October 1990 (aged 23)
26	P	Ndeye Gueye	15 January 1990 (aged 24)
50	GK	Aida Diongue		1.76 m
78		Kafilou Gomis

== Tunisia ==
Head coach: Paulo Pereira

No.	Pos.	Name	Date of birth (age)	Height	App.	Goals	Club
3	RB	Nesrine Daoula	9 April 1990 (aged 23)	1.72 m			(France) Lomme Lille
6	P	Asma Elghaoui	29 August 1991 (aged 22)	1.70 m			(Hungary) Siófok KC
9	RW	Fatma Sfar-Ben-Chker	20 March 1994 (aged 19)	1.70 m	76	198	(Tunisia) ASF Mahdia
10	LB	Raja Toumi	3 April 1978 (aged 35)	1.79 m	230	982	(Tunisia) Club Africain
12	GK	Echraf Abdallah	14 January 1987 (aged 27)	1.81 m	38	0	(Tunisia) Club Africain
15	LW	Refka Hlaili	18 April 1990 (aged 23)	1.69 m			(Tunisia) ASF Sahel
16	GK	Fadia Omrani	27 February 1984 (aged 29)	1.71 m			(Tunisia) ASE Ariana
17	RB	Ouided Kilani	15 June 1982 (aged 31)	1.76 m			(France) Colombelles
18		Haifa Abdelhak	31 October 1982 (aged 31)	1.72 m			(France) Octeville HC
19	RW	Rafika Marzouk	27 October 1979 (aged 34)	1.76 m			(France) CJF Fleury Loiret HB
20	CB	Mouna Chebbah	8 July 1982 (aged 31)	1.76 m	225	963	(France) Handball Cercle Nîmes
22	LB	Maroua Dhaouadi	22 May 1992 (aged 21)	1.75 m			(Tunisia) CSF Bizerte
29	P	Faten Yahiaoui	1 May 1985 (aged 28)	1.71 m	0	0	(France) Noisy Handball
30	LB	Ines Jaouadi	15 September 1989 (aged 24)	1.83 m	59	163	(Tunisia) ASF Sahel
44	P	Manel Kouki	4 February 1988 (aged 25)	1.80 m	73	163	(Tunisia) Mégrine SHBF
85	GK	Noura Ben Slama	23 February 1985 (aged 28)	1.76 m	39	0	(France) Cercle Dijon Bourgogne
