= 2016 African Women's Handball Championship squads =

This article displays the squads for the 2016 African Women's Handball Championship. Each team consists of 16 players.

== Algeria ==
Head coach: Semir Zuzo

No.	Pos.	Name	Date of birth (age)	Height	App.	Goals	Club
2	LW	Ahlem Djayet	18 September 1989 (aged 27)	m
3	LB	Ines Merad	5 December 1997 (aged 19)	m
4	LW	Sarah Bennabi	8 February 1992 (aged 24)	m
5	LB	Aïcha Benaziez	30 July 1994 (aged 22)	m
6	LB	Dounia Haouam	11 June 1991 (aged 25)	m
7	CB	Fatiha Haïmer	6 December 1993 (aged 23)	m
10	CB	Sarah Azzi	28 December 1997 (aged 18)	m
11	LW	Feriel Aït Ahmed	25 September 1989 (aged 27)	m
12	P	Leïla Hadi	30 March 1984 (aged 32)	m
13	CB	Soued Feraoun	8 December 1993 (aged 22)	m
16	GK	Fatima Boussora	3 July 1983 (aged 33)	1.74 m			(Algeria) HBC El Biar
17	LB	Sihem Hemissi	1 June 1985 (aged 31)	1.89 m			(Algeria) GS Pétroliers
18	RB	Nabila Tizi	20 March 1984 (aged 32)	1.85 m			(France) Brest Bretagne Handball
19	RB	Feriel Belouchrani	27 January 1998 (aged 18)	m
21	P	Sylia Zouaoui	27 May 1996 (aged 20)	m
22	GK	Nadia Benabdelhafid	24 June 1990 (aged 26)	m			(France) Mérignac Handball

== Angola ==
Head coach: Filipe Cruz

No.	Pos.	Name	Date of birth (age)	Height	App.	Goals	Club
1	GK	Neyde Barbosa	23 September 1980 (age 44)	1.77 m	26	0	(Angola) Progresso do Sambizanga
2	LW	Joelma Viegas	15 October 1986 (age 38)	1.86 m	0	0	(Angola) Primeiro de Agosto
3	RW	Carolina Morais	13 April 1986 (age 39)	1.60 m	0	0	(Angola) Primeiro de Agosto
4	B	Lourena Carlos	6 October 1988 (age 36)	1.73 m	0	0	(Angola) Progresso do Sambizanga
6	RW	Juliana Machado	6 November 1994 (age 30)	1.70 m	19	43	(Angola) Primeiro de Agosto
8	LB	Lurdes Monteiro	11 July 1984 (age 41)	1.70 m			(Angola) Primeiro de Agosto
9	CB	Natália Bernardo	25 December 1986 (age 38)	1.70 m	67	149	(Angola) Primeiro de Agosto
10	P	Albertina Kassoma	12 June 1996 (age 29)	1.90 m			(Angola) Primeiro de Agosto
11	CB	Luísa Kiala	25 January 1982 (age 43)	1.80 m			(Angola) Primeiro de Agosto
15	RB	Azenaide Carlos	14 June 1990 (age 35)	1.75 m	44	130	(Angola) Petro de Luanda
16	GK	Teresa Almeida	5 May 1988 (age 37)	1.78 m		0	(Angola) Petro de Luanda
17	RB	Wuta Dombaxe	5 April 1986 (age 39)	1.73 m	16	50	(Angola) Primeiro de Agosto
18	B	Vilma Nenganga	12 September 1996 (age 29)	1.72 m			(Angola) Petro de Luanda
21	LB	Magda Cazanga	28 May 1991 (age 34)	1.84 m	15	22	(Angola) Petro de Luanda
25	P	Liliana Venâncio	19 September 1995 (age 29)	1.86 m	0	0	(Angola) Primeiro de Agosto
31	LW	Janete dos Santos	10 June 1991 (age 34)	1.75 m	4	4	(Angola) Progresso do Sambizanga
32	B	Dalva Peres	6 August 1996 (age 29)	1.75 m			(Angola) Primeiro de Agosto
90	LB	Isabel Guialo	8 April 1990 (age 35)	1.72 m	27	42	(Angola) Primeiro de Agosto

== Guinea ==
Head coach: Kevin Decaux

No.	Pos.	Name	Date of birth (age)	Height	App.	Goals	Club
	GK	Cissé Sidibé					(France) Noisy le Grand Gagny Handball
	GK	Fatou Diadhiou					(France) Bayonne Handball
	LB	Esther Zoumenou					(France) Livry Gargan
	LB	Aissatou Toure					(France) Aubervilliers
	LB	Louisa Kobo M’Vila					(France) Montluçon
	RB	Béatrice Gomis					(Belgium) Liège Handball
	RB	Siga Amadi					(France) Dreux AC Handball
	RB	Fanta Diallo					(France) Troyes Handball
	CB	Boye Samba Ademou					(France) Saint-Michel Handball
	CB	Maomouna Cisse					(France) Soissons Handball
	CB	Aminata Diaby					(France) Rennes Handball
	LW	Tracy Shaynna Dalery					(France) Le Havre AC Handball
	LW	Bidzogo Manga					(France) Montigny Handball
	LW	Coulibaly Halimata					(France) Mantes la jolie Handball
	LW	Micheline Soumare					(France) Blanc Mesnil
	LW	Charlotte Correa					(France) Mérignac Handball
	RW	Khady Konaté					(France) Aubervilliers
	RW	Bintu Diallo					(Spain) Rocasa Gran Canaria
	RW	Fatim Soumah					(France) Soissons Handball
		Radjé Sy					(France) Le Havre AC Handball
		Kardiatou Sow					(France) Villers Handball
		Nadia da Silva					(France) Aulnay Handball

== Ivory Coast ==
- Rokhia Fondio
- Gervaise Tegbaglo
- Eva Sigui
- Awa Saramoko
- Abiba Fofana
- Minata Kone
- Ohiri Djedje
- Paula Gondo-Bredou
- Sery Toualy
- Adjoua Konan
- Makourakou Diomande
- Bietso N'kayo
- Ida Yao
- Mariam Traore
- Gaelle Issifou
- Brou Kouame

== Senegal ==
Head coach: Cheick Seck

No.	Pos.	Name	Date of birth (age)	Height	App.	Goals	Club
1		Rosaline Correa
5		Amina Sankare
6		Fatou Seye Ndeye
7	RW	Niacalin Kante		1.68 m
8		Rokhaya Benga
9	LB	Hadja Cisse	7 March 1991 (aged 25)
10		Haby Badiane	19 April 1992 (aged 24)
11	B	Koudiedji Ba	11 May 1990 (aged 26)	1.67 m
15		Maimouna Kanoute
16		Marama Sane
18		Ndeye Benga
19	LW	Adja Paye	26 September 1989 (aged 27)
24	B	Penda Sylla	3 October 1990 (aged 26)
26	P	Ndeye Gueye	15 January 1990 (aged 26)
50	GK	Aida Diongue		1.76 m
78		Kafilou Gomis

== Tunisia ==
Head coach: Mohamed Ali Sghir

No.	Pos.	Name	Date of birth (age)	Height	App.	Goals	Club
	GK	Nesrine Hamza	23 October 1993 (aged 23)	1.74 m
	RW	Fatma Sfar-Ben-Chker	20 March 1994 (aged 22)	1.70 m
		Senda Farah Chaker
	RB	Amal Hamrouni	16 June 1995 (aged 21)	1.56 m
		Basma Sfar
	P	Manel Kouki	4 February 1988 (aged 28)	1.80 m
	LW	Boutheïna Amiche	12 September 1990 (aged 26)	1.72 m
	RB	Saida Rejeb	21 March 1994 (aged 22)	1.74 m
	LB	Ines Khouildi	11 March 1985 (aged 31)	1.83 m
		Sirine Farhani
	P	Rakia Rezgui	26 August 1996 (aged 20)	1.79 m
		Samira Arfaoui
		Oumaima Harbaoui
	LB	Maroua Dhaouadi	22 May 1992 (aged 24)	1.75 m
	CB	Takoua Chabchoub	10 March 1993 (aged 23)	1.72 m
	LB	Ines Jaouadi	15 September 1989 (aged 27)	1.83 m
	LW	Fatma Bouri	9 January 1993 (aged 23)	1.79 m
