= C.D. Primeiro de Agosto (volleyball) =

Angolan volleyball club

Primeiro de Agosto
- Full name: Clube Desportivo Primeiro de Agosto
- Founded: August 1, 1977 (48 years ago)
- Ground: Campo do Gama; Pavilhão da Cidadela, Luanda (Capacity: 1,500)
- Chairman: (Angola) Carlos Hendrick
- League: Angola Volleyball League; Africa Champions Cup

Uniforms
| Home | Away |

Clube Desportivo Primeiro de Agosto is a multisports club from Luanda, Angola. The club's volleyball teams (men and women) compete at the local level, at the Luanda Provincial Volleyball Championship and at the Angola Volleyball League as well as at continental level, at the annual African Volleyball Champions League competitions.

== Primeiro de Agosto Men's Volleyball ==
=== Honours: Men's Volleyball ===
- League :
  - Winner (11): 2004, 2005, 2006, 2007, 2008, 2009, 2010, 2011, 2012, 2013, 2014
  - Runner Up (1) : 2003
- Angola Cup:
  - Winner (0):
  - Runner Up (0) :
- CAVB Club Champions Cup:
  - Winner (0):
  - Runner Up (0) :

=== 2015 squad (Men) ===
Primeiro de Agosto Men's Volleyball squad
**Libero**

 11  Lukeny Guimarães

**Setters**

 01  Honorato Gonçalo
 06  Jeremias Neves
 07  Evgenni Setas
 13  Osvaldo Hebo

**Middle blockers**

 08  Dissoluta Fernando
 10  António Gomes
 15  Kindele Eduardo
 17  Filipe Lima

**Opposites**

 04  Rui André
 09  Ilídio Mucomo
 14  Gerson Leitão 26

**Outside hitters**

 05  Emiliano Secai
 16  Dário dos Santos

**Technical staff**

      Zé Maria Head Coach 
      Paulino Caetano  Assistant Coach
      Hernâni Bastos Head of Dept

- Players in **bold** indicate starting lineup

=== Former Managers ===
| (Angola) | Hernâni Bastos |
| (Portugal) | Gustavo Cruz |

== Primeiro de Agosto Women's Volleyball ==
=== Honours: Women's Volleyball ===
- National League:
  - Winner (21): 1992, 1993, 1994, 1995, 1996, 1997, 1998, 1999, 2000, 2001, 2002, 2003, 2004, 2005, 2006, 2007, 2008, 2009, 2010, 2013, 2014
  - Runner Up (2) : 2011, 2012
- Angola Cup:
  - Winner (0):
  - Runner Up (1) : 2013
- CAVB Club Champions Cup:
  - Winner (0):
  - Runner Up (0) :

=== 2015 squad (Women) ===
Primeiro de Agosto Women's Volleyball squad
**Libero**

 03  Rita Cardoso Fitinha
 05  Telma Nunes
 11  Alice Magalhães
 18  Ariete Macedo

**Setters**

 02  Tuny João
 04  Alice Sangombe

**Middle blockers**

 10  Antónia Jandira
 14  Katiana Augusto

**Opposites**

 06  Helena Fausto
 08  Katiana Magalhães
 15  Ana Maria

**Outside hitters**

 01  Weza Albuquerque
 09  Noémia Bartolomeu
 12  Sheila da Conceição

**Technical staff**

     Rolando Milanes Head Coach 
     Hernâni Bastos Head of Dept

- Players in **bold** indicate starting lineup

=== Managers ===
| (Angola) | Emanuel Fernandes |
| (Cuba) | Rolando Milanes | Mar 2014 | – |

=== Past squads (Men) ===
2014 Primeiro de Agosto Men's Volleyball squad (1st)
**Libero**

 01  Fábio Figueiredo

**Setters**

 05  Emiliano Secai
 06  Walter Gonçalo

**Middle blockers**

 07  Edson Frutuoso
 08  Filipe Lima 
 10  António Gomes

**Outside hitters**

 11  Rui André
 12  João Gouveia
 13  Hildebrando Bastos 26
 14  Gerson Leitão 25

**Opposites**

  05  Osvaldo Moreira
  16  Dário dos Santos

**Technical staff**

      Zé Maria Head Coach 
      Paulino Caetano  Assistant Coach
      Hernâni Bastos Head of Dept

2014 Primeiro de Agosto Women's Volleyball squad (1st)
**Libero**

     Alice Marcolino

**Setters**

     Ângela Domingos

**Middle blockers**

     Antónia Manuela
     Edera Barreto 

**Outside hitters**

     Felisbela António
     Janeth Marta
     Rita Cardoso

**Opposites**

      Sofia Makazu
      Telma Nunes
      Weza Albuquerque

**Technical staff**

      Rolando Milanes Head Coach 
      Hernâni Bastos Head of Dept

- Players in **bold** indicate starting lineup

== Players ==
List of Primeiro de Agosto Volleyball players

=== Men's 2014–2016 ===
**Primeiro de Agosto Men's Volleyball players 2011–2016**
# = Angola league winner

| Nat | # | Name | A | P | – | – | – | – | Z.M. | – | – |
| Nat | # | Name | A | P | 2011 | 2012 | 2013 | 2014 | 2015 | 2016 | 2017 |
| Nat | # | Name | A | P | L | L | L | L | L | L | |
|---|---|---|---|---|---|---|---|---|---|---|---|
| (Angola) | ⋅ | António Gomes | ⋅ | MB | ⋅ | ⋅ | ⋅ | ⋅ | 10 | ⋅ | ⋅ |
| (Angola) | ⋅ | Dario dos Santos | ⋅ | OH | ⋅ | ⋅ | ⋅ | ⋅ | 16 | ⋅ | ⋅ |
| (Angola) | ⋅ | Dissoluta Fernando | ⋅ | MB | ⋅ | ⋅ | ⋅ | ⋅ | 8 | ⋅ | ⋅ |
| (Angola) | ⋅ | Emiliano Secai | ⋅ | OH | ⋅ | ⋅ | ⋅ | ⋅ | 5 | ⋅ | ⋅ |
| (Angola) | ⋅ | Evgenni Setas | ⋅ | S | ⋅ | ⋅ | ⋅ | ⋅ | 7 | ⋅ | ⋅ |
| (Angola) | ⋅ | Filipe Lima | ⋅ | MB | ⋅ | ⋅ | ⋅ | ⋅ | 17 | ⋅ | ⋅ |
| (Angola) | ⋅ | Gerson Leitão | 26 | O | ⋅ | ⋅ | ⋅ | ⋅ | 14 | ⋅ | ⋅ |
| (Angola) | ⋅ | Honorato Gonçalo | ⋅ | S | ⋅ | ⋅ | ⋅ | ⋅ | 1 | ⋅ | ⋅ |
| (Angola) | ⋅ | Ilídio Mucomo | ⋅ | O | ⋅ | ⋅ | ⋅ | ⋅ | 9 | ⋅ | ⋅ |
| (Angola) | ⋅ | Jeremias Neves | ⋅ | S | ⋅ | ⋅ | ⋅ | ⋅ | 6 | ⋅ | ⋅ |
| (Angola) | ⋅ | Kindele Eduardo | ⋅ | MB | ⋅ | ⋅ | ⋅ | ⋅ | 15 | ⋅ | ⋅ |
| (Angola) | ⋅ | Lukeny Guimarães | ⋅ | L | ⋅ | ⋅ | ⋅ | ⋅ | 11 | ⋅ | ⋅ |
| (Angola) | ⋅ | Osvaldo Hebo | ⋅ | S | ⋅ | ⋅ | ⋅ | ⋅ | 13 | ⋅ | ⋅ |
| (Angola) | ⋅ | Rui André | ⋅ | O | ⋅ | ⋅ | ⋅ | ⋅ | 4 | ⋅ | ⋅ |
| (Angola) | ⋅ | | ⋅ | ⋅ | ⋅ | ⋅ | ⋅ | ⋅ | ⋅ | ⋅ | ⋅ |

=== Women's 2011–2016 ===
**Primeiro de Agosto Women's Volleyball players 2011–2016**
**L = Angola league winner; C = African champions cup winner**

| Nat | # | Name | A | P | H | P. Pereira | | J.F. | V.T. | J.F. | Filipe Cruz | – | |
| Nat | # | Name | A | P | H | 2011 | 2012 | 2013 | 2014 | 2015 | 2016 | 2017 | |
| Nat | # | Name | A | P | H | L | | L | LC | LC | LC | | |
|---|---|---|---|---|---|---|---|---|---|---|---|---|---|
| (Angola) | 11 | Albertina Kassoma | 20 | P | 1.90 | 96 | ⋅ | ⋅ | ⋅ | injured | injured | 11 | ⋅ |
| (Angola) | 4 | Carolina Morais Carol | 30 | W | 1.60 | 64 | ⋅ | ⋅ | ⋅ | 4 | 4 | 4 | ⋅ |
| (Democratic Republic of the Congo) | 23 | Christianne Mwasesa | 31 | B | 1.75 | | ⋅ | ⋅ | ⋅ | ⋅ | 23 | 23 | ⋅ |
| (Angola) | 12 | Cristina Branco Branca | 31 | GK | 1.74 | 68 | ⋅ | ⋅ | ⋅ | 12 | 12 | 12 | ⋅ |
| (Angola) | ⋅ | Dalva Peres | 20 | B | 1.70 | 68 | ⋅ | ⋅ | ⋅ | ⋅ | 24 | ⋅ | ⋅ |
| (Angola) | 7 | Elizabeth Cailo Jú | 29 | W | 1.75 | 70 | ⋅ | ⋅ | ⋅ | 7 | 7 | 7 | ⋅ |
| (Angola) | 5 | Elizabeth Viegas | 31 | P | 1.77 | 75 | ⋅ | ⋅ | ⋅ | ⋅ | 5 | 5 | ⋅ |
| (Angola) | ⋅ | Elzira Barros | 34 | B | 1.84 | 86 | ⋅ | ⋅ | ⋅ | 21 | ⋅ | ⋅ | ⋅ |
| (Angola) | ⋅ | Florinda Caiango Fofó | 19 | W | | | ⋅ | ⋅ | ⋅ | 3 | ⋅ | ⋅ | ⋅ |
| (Angola) | 16 | Helena Sousa | 22 | GK | 1.90 | 85 | ⋅ | ⋅ | ⋅ | ⋅ | ⋅ | 16 | ⋅ |
| (Angola) | 3 | Iracelma Silva | 25 | W | 1.74 | 53 | ⋅ | ⋅ | ⋅ | ⋅ | 3 | 3 | ⋅ |
| (Angola) | ⋅ | Isabel Eduardo Isa | 23 | P | 1.70 | 64 | ⋅ | ⋅ | ⋅ | 18 | 18 | ⋅ | ⋅ |
| (Angola) | 22 | Isabel Guialo Belinha | 26 | B | 1.68 | 65 | ⋅ | ⋅ | ⋅ | 22 | 22 | 22 | ⋅ |
| (Angola) | 13 | Joelma Viegas Cajó | 30 | W | 1.68 | 64 | ⋅ | ⋅ | ⋅ | 13 | 13 | 13 | ⋅ |
| (Angola) | 6 | Juliana Machado | 22 | W | 1.73 | 56 | ⋅ | ⋅ | ⋅ | 6 | 6 | 6 | ⋅ |
| (Angola) | 15 | Liliana Venâncio | 21 | P | 1.88 | | ⋅ | ⋅ | ⋅ | 15 | 15 | 15 | ⋅ |
| (Democratic Republic of the Congo) | ⋅ | Louise Makubanza | 23 | GK | 1.80 | | ⋅ | ⋅ | ⋅ | ⋅ | 30 | ⋅ | ⋅ |
| (Angola) | 18 | Luisa Kiala | 33 | B | 1.74 | 58 | ⋅ | ⋅ | ⋅ | ⋅ | ⋅ | 18 | ⋅ |
| (Angola) | 8 | Lurdes Monteiro | 31 | B | 1.68 | 67 | ⋅ | ⋅ | ⋅ | 8 | 8 | 8 | ⋅ |
| (Angola) | ⋅ | Marta Alberto | 20 | GK | 1.80 | 75 | ⋅ | ⋅ | ⋅ | ⋅ | 20 | ⋅ | ⋅ |
| (Angola) | ⋅ | Nair Almeida | 31 | B | 1.80 | 64 | ⋅ | ⋅ | ⋅ | 17 | 17 | ⋅ | ⋅ |
| (Angola) | 9 | Natália Bernardo | 30 | B | 1.70 | 57 | ⋅ | ⋅ | ⋅ | ⋅ | 9 | 9 | ⋅ |
| (Angola) | ⋅ | Rossana Quitongo Wandi | 25 | B | 1.74 | 61 | ⋅ | ⋅ | ⋅ | 2 | 2 | ⋅ | ⋅ |
| (Angola) | 1 | Silvia Mulabo | 25 | GK | 1.84 | 61 | ⋅ | ⋅ | ⋅ | 1 | 1 | 1 | ⋅ |
| (Angola) | ⋅ | Tchesa Pemba | 19 | B | | | ⋅ | ⋅ | ⋅ | 5 | ⋅ | ⋅ | ⋅ |
| (Angola) | 10 | Teresa Leite | 21 | B | 1.77 | 70 | ⋅ | ⋅ | ⋅ | ⋅ | 10 | 10 | ⋅ |
| (Angola) | ⋅ | Voneiti Domingos | 19 | W | | | ⋅ | ⋅ | ⋅ | 10 | ⋅ | ⋅ | ⋅ |
| (Angola) | 19 | Wuta Dombaxe | 30 | B | 1.68 | 68 | ⋅ | ⋅ | ⋅ | 19 | 19 | 19 | ⋅ |

- Players in **bold** indicate starting lineup

== See also ==
- Primeiro de Agosto Football
- Primeiro de Agosto Basketball
- Primeiro de Agosto Handball
- Primeiro de Agosto Roller Hockey
