= Wang Xiaohua =

Wang Xiaohua may refer to:

- Wang Xiaohua (politician), Chinese politician
- Wang Xiaohua (handballer), Chinese handballer
