= Alana Pedrozo =

Paraguayan handball player (born 1992)

Personal information
- Nationality: Paraguayan
- Born: 7 August 1992 (age 34)
- Height: 1.69 m (5 ft 7 in)

Sport
- Sport: Handball
- Position: Left wing
- Current club: San Jose Handball
National team
Years	Team	Apps	(Gls)
–	Paraguay	18	(30)
Medal record
Pan American Championship
Bronze medal – third place	2017 Argentina
Bolivarian Games
Gold medal – first place	2013 Trujillo

Alana Pedrozo (born 7 August 1992) is a Paraguayan team handball player for San Jose and the Paraguay national team.

She represented Paraguay at the 2013 World Women's Handball Championship in Serbia, where the Paraguayan team placed 21st.
