= Pilar Frutos =

Paraguayan handball player (born 1991)

Personal information
- Nationality: Paraguayan
- Born: 27 August 1991 (age 35)
- Height: 1.65 m (5 ft 5 in)

Sport
- Sport: Handball
- Position: Left back
- Current club: Santa Elena Handball
National team
Years	Team	Apps	(Gls)
–	Paraguay	0	(0)
Medal record
Bolivarian Games
Gold medal – first place	2013 Trujillo

Pilar Frutos (born 27 August 1991) is a Paraguayan team handball player. She plays for the club Santa Elena, and on the Paraguay national team. She represented Paraguay at the 2013 World Women's Handball Championship in Serbia, where the Paraguayan team placed 21st.
