= Leysa Beggan =

Paraguayan handball player (born 1992)

Personal information
- Nationality: Paraguayan
- Born: 12 December 1992 (age 33)
- Height: 1.70 m (5 ft 7 in)

Sport
- Sport: Handball
- Position: Left back
- Current club: Nueva Estrella
National team
| Years | Team | Apps | (Gls) |
| – | Paraguay | 10 | (6) |
Medal record
Bolivarian Games
| Gold medal – first place | 2013 Trujillo |

Leysa Beggan (born 12 December 1992) is a Paraguayan team handball player. She plays for the club Nueva Estrella, and on the Paraguay national team. She represented Paraguay at the 2013 World Women's Handball Championship in Serbia, where the Paraguayan team placed 21st.
