= Georginna Battaglia =

Paraguayan handball player (born 1995)

Personal information
- Full name: Georginna Battaglia Benítez
- Nationality: Paraguayan
- Born: 15 February 1995 (age 31)
- Height: 1.73 m (5 ft 8 in)

Sport
- Sport: Handball
- Position: Left wing
- Current club: Atlántida Sport Club
National team
Years	Team	Apps	(Gls)
–	Paraguay	98	(42)
Medal record
Bolivarian Games
Gold medal – first place	2013 Trujillo	Team
Gold medal – first place	2017 Santa Marta	Team

Georginna Battaglia Benítez (born 15 February 1995) is a Paraguayan handball player for Atlántida Sport Club and the Paraguay national team.

She represented Paraguay at the 2013 World Women's Handball Championship in Serbia, where the Paraguayan team placed 21st, which is their best result to date (as of 2026). She also played at the 2017 World Women's Handball Championship.
