= Analia Yaryes =

Paraguayan handball player (born 1993)

Personal information
- Full name: Analia Araceli Yaryes Estaque
- Nationality: Paraguayan
- Born: 9 August 1993 (age 33)
- Height: 1.75 m (5 ft 9 in)

Sport
- Sport: Handball
- Position: Goalkeeper
- Current club: Club Cerro Porteño
National team
Years	Team	Apps	(Gls)
–	Paraguay	150	(0)
Medal record
Pan American Championship
Bronze medal – third place	2017 Argentina
South and Central American Championship
Bronze medal – third place	2018 Brazil
Bronze medal – third place	2021 Paraguay
Bolivarian Games
Gold medal – first place	2013 Trujillo	Team
Gold medal – first place	2017 Santa Marta	Team

Analia Araceli Yaryes Estaque (born 9 August 1993) is a Paraguayan team handball goalkeeper for Club Cerro Porteño and the Paraguay national team.

She represented Paraguay at the 2013 World Women's Handball Championship in Serbia, where the Paraguayan team placed 21st, which is their best result to date (as of 2026). She also played at the 2017 World Women's Handball Championship.
