= Alexia Cáceres =

Paraguayan handball player (born 1995)

Personal information
- Nationality: Paraguayan
- Born: 31 January 1995 (age 31)
- Height: 1.70 m (5 ft 7 in)

Sport
- Sport: Handball
- Position: Left wing
- Current club: Nueva Estrella
National team
Years	Team	Apps	(Gls)
–	Paraguay	15	(38)
Medal record
Bolivarian Games
Gold medal – first place	2013 Trujillo

Alexia Cáceres (born 31 January 1995) is a Paraguayan team handball player. She plays for the club Nueva Estrella, and on the Paraguay national team. She represented Paraguay at the 2013 World Women's Handball Championship in Serbia, where the Paraguayan team placed 21st.
