= Myrian Rodríguez =

Paraguayan team handball player (born 1989)

Personal information
- Nationality: Paraguayan
- Born: 13 February 1989 (age 37)
- Height: 1.75 m (5 ft 9 in)

Sport
- Sport: Handball
- Position: Pivot
- Current club: Nueva Estrella
National team
Years	Team	Apps	(Gls)
–	Paraguay	25	(15)
Medal record
Bolivarian Games
Gold medal – first place	2013 Trujillo

Myrian Rodríguez (born 13 February 1989) is a Paraguayan team handball player. She plays for the club Nueva Estrella, and on the Paraguay national team. She represented Paraguay at the 2013 World Women's Handball Championship in Serbia, where the Paraguayan team placed 21st.
