= María Gómez (handballer) =

Paraguayan team handball player (born 1984)

Personal information
- Nationality: Paraguayan
- Born: 22 January 1984 (age 42)
- Height: 1.67 m (5 ft 6 in)

Sport
- Sport: Handball
- Position: Left wing
- Current club: Universidad Americana
National team
Years	Team	Apps	(Gls)
–	Paraguay	15	(20)
Medal record
Bolivarian Games
Gold medal – first place	2013 Trujillo

María Gómez (born 22 January 1984) is a Paraguayan team handball player. She plays for the Universidad Americana, and on the Paraguay national team. She represented Paraguay at the 2013 World Women's Handball Championship in Serbia, where the Paraguayan team placed 21st.
