= Anna Kawamura =

Japanese handball player (born 1991)

Personal information
- Nationality: Japanese
- Born: 26 October 1991 (age 34)
- Height: 1.67 m (5 ft 6 in)

Sport
- Sport: Handball
- Position: Centre back
- Current club: Sony Semiconductor
National team
Years	Team	Apps	(Gls)
–	Japan	13	(18)

Anna Kawamura (born 26 October 1991) is a Japanese handball player for Sony Semiconductor and the Japanese Republic national team.
