= Zheng Dongdong =

Chinese handball player (born 1988)

Personal information
- Nationality: Chinese
- Born: 10 December 1988 (age 37)
- Height: 1.80 m (5 ft 11 in)

Sport
- Sport: Handball
- Position: Pivot
- Current club: Anhui Club
National team
Years	Team	Apps	(Gls)
–	China	5	(13)

Zheng Dongdong (born 10 December 1988) is a Chinese team handball player. She plays for the club Anhui HC, and on the Chinese national team. She represented China at the 2013 World Women's Handball Championship in Serbia, where the Chinese team placed 18th.
