= Zu Cui =

Chinese handball player (born 1990)

Maja
Personal information
- Nationality: Chinese
- Born: 20 June 1990 (age 36)
- Height: 1.74 m (5 ft 9 in)

Sport
- Sport: Handball
- Position: Right back
- Current club: Anhui Club
National team
| Years | Team | Apps | (Gls) |
| – | China | 18 | (22) |

Zu Cui (born 20 June 1990) is a Chinese team handball player. She plays for the club Anhui HC, and on the Chinese national team. She represented China at the 2013 World Women's Handball Championship in Serbia, where the Chinese team placed 18th.
