= Parisel Mpemba =

Democratic Republic of the Congo handball player

Personal information
- Nationality: Congolese
- Born: 1 December 1978 (age 47)
- Height: 1.75 m (5 ft 9 in)

Sport
- Sport: Handball
- Position: Pivot
- Current club: St. Maure
National team
- Years: Team
- –: DR Congo

Parisel Mpemba (born 1 December 1978) is a team handball player from the Democratic Republic of the Congo. She played for the French clubs St. Maure, Rosières-Saint-Julien, Romilly and Carignan, and on the DR Congo national team. She represented DR Congo at the 2013 World Women's Handball Championship in Serbia, where DR Congo placed 20th, and at the 2019 African Games, winning the bronze medal. She also won the silver medal at the 2014 African Women's Handball Championship.
