= Małgorzata Gapska =

Polish handball player (born 1983)

Personal information
- Nationality: Polish
- Born: 3 September 1983 (age 43) Gdańsk, Poland
- Height: 1.76 m (5 ft 9 in)

Sport
- Sport: Handball
- Position: Goalkeeper
- Current club: Vistal Gdynia
- Number: 12
National team
Years	Team	Apps	(Gls)
2005-2014	Poland	81	(1)

Małgorzata Gapska (born 3 September 1983) is a Polish handball player. She plays for the club Vistal Gdynia, the Polish national team and represented Poland at the 2013 World Women's Handball Championship in Serbia.
