= Kanna Masuda =

Japanese handball player (born 1989)

Personal information
- Nationality: Japanese
- Born: 8 October 1989 (age 37)
- Height: 1.75 m (5 ft 9 in)

Sport
- Sport: Handball
- Position: Left back
- Current club: Hiroshima Maple Reds
National team
Years	Team	Apps	(Gls)
–	Japan	2	(4)

Kanna Masuda (増田 寛那, Masuda Kanna; born 8 October 1989) is a Japanese team handball player. She plays for the club Hiroshima Maplered, and on the Japanese national team. She represented Japan at the 2013 World Women's Handball Championship in Serbia, where the Japanese team placed 14th.
