= Si Yan =

Chinese handball player (born 1989)

Personal information
- Nationality: Chinese
- Born: 9 December 1989 (age 36)
- Height: 1.82 m (6 ft 0 in)

Sport
- Sport: Handball
- Position: Goalkeeper
- Current club: Anhui Club
National team
Years	Team	Apps	(Gls)
–	China	71	(0)

Si Yan (born 9 December 1989) is a Chinese team handball goalkeeper. She plays for the Anhui HC, and on the Chinese national team. She represented China at the 2013 World Women's Handball Championship in Serbia, where the Chinese team placed 18th.
