= Ratiba Hassnaoui =

Algerian handball player (born 1987)

Personal information
- Nationality: Algerian
- Born: 4 March 1987 (age 39)
- Height: 1.89 m (6 ft 2 in)

Sport
- Sport: Handball
- Position: Pivot
- Current club: HBC El Biar
National team
Years	Team	Apps	(Gls)
–	Algeria	61	(50)

Ratiba Hassnaoui (born 4 March 1987) is an Algerian handball player for HBC El Biar and the Algerian national team.
