= Wang Hsiao-hua =

Chinese politician

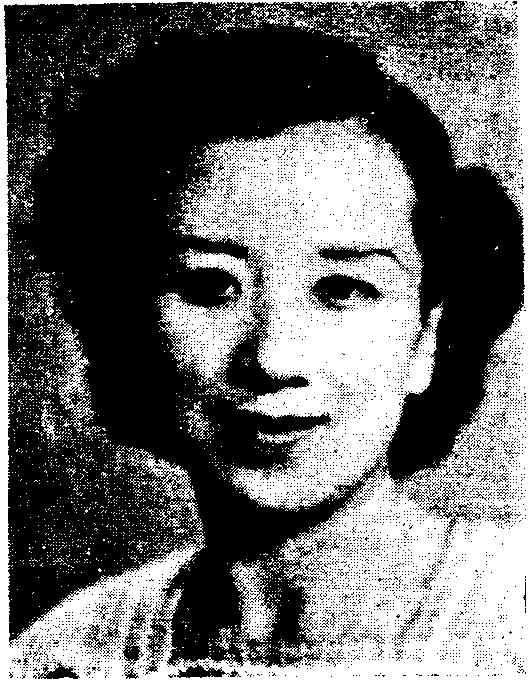

Member of the Legislative Yuan
- In office 1948–1991
- Constituency: Xing'an

Personal details
- Born: 29 June 1922
- Died: 11 March 2005 (aged 82)

Wang Hsiao-hua (Chinese: 王孝華, 29 June 1922 – 11 March 2005) was a Chinese politician. She was among the first group of women elected to the Legislative Yuan in 1948.

== Biography ==
Born in 1922 and originally from Yalu County in Xing'an Province (now part of Zalantun), Wang attended Heilongjiang Women's Normal School, after which she went to Japan to study at Nara Advanced Teacher's College for Women. She then worked as a researcher in the Faculty of Education at the University of Tokyo. Returning to China, she became chair of the women's section of the Xing'an branch of the Kuomintang and served as a councillor in the Xing'an provincial government.

Wang was a delegate to the 1946 Constituent National Assembly that drew up the constitution of the Republic of China. In the 1948 elections for the Legislative Yuan, she was a Kuomintang candidate in Xing'an, and was elected to parliament. She relocated to Taiwan during the Chinese Civil War,

She died in March 2005.
