= Mourad Ait Ouarab =

Algerian handball coach

Mourad Ait Ouarab is an Algerian handball coach of the Algerian national team.
