= Arata Nishikiori =

Japanese handball player (born 1991)

Personal information
- Nationality: Japanese
- Born: 7 September 1991 (age 35)
- Height: 1.67 m (5 ft 6 in)

Sport
- Sport: Handball
- Position: Pivot
- Current club: Sony Semiconductor
National team
Years	Team	Apps	(Gls)
–	Japan	2	(3)

Arata Nishikiori (錦織 新, Nishikiori Arata; born 7 September 1991) is a Japanese team handball player. She plays for the club Sony Semiconductor, and on the Japanese national team. She represented Japan at the 2013 World Women's Handball Championship in Serbia, where the Japanese team placed 14th.
