= Hou Yibo =

Chinese handball player (born 1991)

Personal information
- Nationality: Chinese
- Born: 23 July 1991 (age 35)
- Height: 1.80 m (5 ft 11 in)

Sport
- Sport: Handball
- Position: Goalkeeper
- Current club: Beijing Club
National team
Years	Team	Apps	(Gls)
–	China	20	(0)

Hou Yibo (born 23 July 1991) is a Chinese team handball goalkeeper. She plays for the club Beijing HC, and on the Chinese national team. She represented China at the 2013 World Women's Handball Championship in Serbia, where the Chinese team placed 18th.
