= Sato Shiroishi =

Japanese handball player (born 1992)

Personal information
- Nationality: Japanese
- Born: 2 December 1992 (age 33)
- Height: 1.74 m (5 ft 9 in)

Sport
- Sport: Handball
- Position: Goalkeeper
- Current club: Tokyo Women's College
National team
- Years: Team
- –: Japan

Sato Shiroishi (born 2 December 1992) is a Japanese handball player for Tokyo Women's College and the Japanese national team.
