= Virginie Mamba =

Congolese handball player

Personal information
- Nationality: Congolese
- Born: 5 December 1980 (age 45)
- Height: 1.80 m (5 ft 11 in)

Sport
- Sport: Handball
- Position: Pivot
- Current club: Héritage Kinshasa
National team
- Years: Team
- –: DR Congo

Virginie Mamba (born 5 December 1980) is a Congolese handball player. She plays for the club Héritage Kinshasa and is member of the DR Congo national team. She competed at the 2015 World Women's Handball Championship in Denmark.
