= Handball at the 2013 Bolivarian Games =

- Dates: 17–21 November 2013
- Nations: 8

Handball, for the 2013 Bolivarian Games, took place from 17 November to 21 November 2013.

== Medal summary ==
Event	Gold	Silver	Bronze
Men	Venezuela; Huepdian Jesus Arauqe Rivera; Julio Cesar Cordero Alvizu; Rafael Ali Correa; Romny Jose Goyo Perez; Leonardo Jeanpiere Guaita; Jesus Ricardo Guarecuco Castillo; Brahyan Enmanuel Hurtado Arrechea; Helson Mervil Noel Noel; Jose Gregorio Palacios Chacha; Jhonny Alberto Peñaloza Medina; Drubil Antonio Silva Suarez; Edwuard Alejandro Suarez Caballero; Taiver Pastor Timaure Martinez; Deynervi Jose Veliz Saavedra; Juan Jose Villalobos Armas; Ulises Yordan Yañez Vasquez	Colombia; Jaime Benjumea Tobon; Anderson Caicedo Gomez; David Cardona Hernandez; Oscar Gomez; Santiago Guerra Osorio; Cristian Ibarguen Angel; Jose Londoño Bedolla; Jose Luis Restrepo; Sebastian Restrepo; Santigo Rios Gallego; Bryan Teran; Carlos Jose Valencia	Guatemala; Carlos Rene Caal Escobar; Mynor Ariel Chen Zapeta; Carlos Augusto Dávila Ruano; Kevin Estuardo Escobar Muñoz; Brándon René García Cermeño; Edwin Alberto Garrido Orellana; Ubaldo Antonio Herrera Juarez; Luis Adolfo Mendez Díaz; Boris Joaquin Morales Acevedo; Victor Manuel Morales Chacon; Yonatan Esau Ramos Contreras; Alan Rodrigo Salazar Valladares; Carlos Gustavo Samayoa Gonzalez; Ronald Donaldo Sance Monroy; Cristian Renato Vasquez De Leon
Women	Paraguay; Ana Acuña; Georginna Battaglia; Leysa Beggan; Rebeca Bordon; Alexia Cáceres; Ana Giuliana Cristaldo Vera; Marizza Faría; Sabrina Fiore; Pilar Frutos; María Gómez; Maria Alejandra Gonzalez Deves; Alana Pedrozo; Myrian Rodríguez; Kamila Rolon; Alicia Villalba; Analia Yaryes	Chile; Maura Alvarez; Belen Castañeda; Aileen Doiering Urrutia; Michelle Farreaud; Pamela del Carmen Flores Catalan; Flavia Alejandra Jara Kara; Maria Jose Letelier; Gabriela Mancilla; Daniella Alejandra Miño Larenas; Natacha Muller; Antonela Piantini; Javiera Quiroz; Veronica Francisca Torres Lara; Alicia Ignacia Torres Lara; Carolina Verdejo Pulgar; Francisca Zavala	Venezuela; Miriam Carolina Abdalla Hayat; Susan Ines Barinas Gamboa; Oriana Carolina Carvajal Ojeda; Maikelly Michelle Cedeño Bracho; Paola del Valle Mata Brito; Karly Johana Monterola Palacios; Nelvis Carolina Pacheco Mata; Frannely Juvileth Polanco Garces; Olga Adriana Rivas Flores; Liliangel Estefania Rivero Alfaro; Any Yumadra Rodriguez Castillo; Genesis Gabriela Rodriguez Rodriguez; Marian Oriana Salcedo Rodriguez; Diana Carolina Sanchez Rondon; Jennifer Heymar Torrealba Echeverria; Hernairys Teresa Vargas
