= Nassima Dob =

Algerian handball player (born 1980)

Personal information
- Nationality: Algerian
- Born: 24 December 1980 (age 45)
- Height: 1.72 m (5 ft 8 in)

Sport
- Sport: Handball
- Position: Central back
- Current club: GS Pétroliers
National team
Years	Team	Apps	(Gls)
–	Algeria	107	(321)

Nassima Dob (born 24 December 1980) is an Algerian team handball player. She plays for the club GS Pétroliers, and on the Algerian national team. She represented Algeria at the 2013 World Women's Handball Championship in Serbia, where the Algerian team placed 22nd.
