= Nicole Mbole =

Congolese handball player

Personal information
- Full name: Nicole Mbole Kibambe
- Nationality: Congolese
- Born: 12 December 1981 (age 44)
- Height: 1.60 m (5 ft 3 in)

Sport
- Sport: Handball
- Position: Goalkeeper
- Current club: Mikishi Lubumbashi
National team
- Years: Team
- 2013-?: DR Congo

Nicole Mbole (born 12 December 1981) is a Congolese handball player for Mikishi Lubumbashi and the DR Congo national team.
