= Alice Lévêque =

French handball player (born 1989)

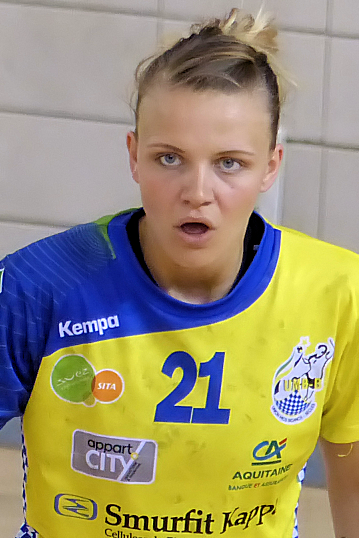

Personal information
- Nationality: French
- Born: 9 May 1989 (age 37) Mulhouse, France
- Height: 1.72 m (5 ft 8 in)

Sport
- Sport: Handball
- Position: Left back
- Current club: ESBF Besançon
- Number: 97

Senior clubs
- Years: Team
- 2009–2010: Cercle Dijon Bourgogne
- 2010–2013: ESBF Besançon
- 2013–2015: Union Mios Biganos-Bègles
- 2015–2016: Metz Handball
- 2016-2020: ESBF Besançon
- 2023: Masevaux Handball
National team
Years	Team	Apps	(Gls)
2009-2016	France	45	(min. 21)
Medal record
Mediterranean Games
Gold medal – first place	2009 Pescara	Team

Alice Lévêque (born 9 May 1989) is a French former handball player. She retired in 2020, while playing for ESBF Besançon. She played for the French national team. She represented France at the 2013 World Women's Handball Championship in Serbia. In 2023 she made a short comeback to play for Masevaux Handball.
