= Souhila Abdelkader =

Algerian handball player (born 1978)

Personal information
- Nationality: Algerian
- Born: 21 April 1978 (age 48)
- Height: 1.62 m (5 ft 4 in)

Sport
- Sport: Handball
- Position: Goalkeeper
- Current club: GS Pétroliers
National team
Years	Team	Apps	(Gls)
–	Algeria	12	(0)

Souhila Abdelkader (born 21 April 1978) is an Algerian team handball goalkeeper.

== Career ==
She plays for the club GS Pétroliers, and on the Algerian national team. She competed at the 2013 World Women's Handball Championship in Serbia, where Algeria placed 22nd.
