= Saida Rejeb =

Tunisian handball player

Personal information
- Nationality: Tunisian
- Born: 21 March 1994 (age 32)
- Height: 1.74 m (5 ft 9 in)

Sport
- Sport: Handball
- Position: Right back
- Current club: Olympique de Gafsa
National team
Years	Team	Apps	(Gls)
–	Tunisia	31	(52)

Saida Rejeb (born 21 March 1994) is a Tunisian handball player. She plays for the club Olympique de Gafsa and on the Tunisian national team. She represented Tunisia at the 2013 World Women's Handball Championship in Serbia.
