= Penda Sylla =

Senegalese handball player (born 1990)

Personal information
- Nationality: Senegalese
- Born: 3 October 1990 (age 36) Strasbourg, France

Sport
- Sport: Handball
- Position: Left back
- Current club: ASPTT Strasbourg
National team
- Years: Team
- –: Senegal

Penda Sylla (born 3 October 1990) is a Senegalese handball player for ASPTT Strasbourg and the Senegalese national team.

She competed at the 2019 World Women's Handball Championship in Japan.
