= Carole Babala =

Democratic Republic of the Congo handball player

Personal information
- Nationality: Congolese
- Born: 14 June 1989 (age 37)
- Height: 1.70 m (5 ft 7 in)

Sport
- Sport: Handball
- Position: Left back
- Current club: U.S. Alfortville
National team
- Years: Team
- –: DR Congo

Carole Babala (born 14 June 1989) is a team handball player from the Democratic Republic of the Congo. She plays for the club Alfortville, and on the DR Congo national team. She represented DR Congo at the 2013 World Women's Handball Championship in Serbia, where DR Congo placed 20th.
