= Bibiche Kabamba =

Congolese handball player

Personal information
- Full name: Bibiche Kabamba Tsehela
- Nationality: Congolese
- Born: 15 July 1981 (age 45)
- Height: 1.84 m (6 ft 0 in)

Sport
- Sport: Handball
- Position: Goalkeeper
- Current club: Héritage Kinshasa
National team
- Years: Team
- –: DR Congo

Bibiche Kabamba (born 15 July 1981) is a Congolese handball player. She plays for the club Héritage Kinshasa and on the DR Congo national team. She represented DR Congo at the 2013 World Women's Handball Championship in Serbia, where DR Congo placed 20th.
