= Rima Khelil =

Algerian handball player (born 1989)

Personal information
- Nationality: Algerian
- Born: 21 March 1989 (age 37)
- Height: 1.70 m (5 ft 7 in)

Sport
- Sport: Handball
- Position: Pivot
- Current club: RIJA Alger
National team
Years	Team	Apps	(Gls)
–	Algeria	10	(15)

Rima Khelil (born 21 March 1989) is an Algerian team handball player. She plays for the club Rija, and on the Algerian national team. She represented Algeria at the 2013 World Women's Handball Championship in Serbia, where the Algerian team placed 22nd.
