= Nesrine Daoula =

Tunisian team handball player

Personal information
- Nationality: Tunisian
- Born: 9 April 1990 (age 36) Bizerte, Tunisia
- Height: 1.72 m (5 ft 8 in)

Sport
- Sport: Handball
- Position: Right back
- Current club: Lomme Handball
National team
Years	Team	Apps	(Gls)
–	Tunisia	62	(141)

Nesrine Daoula (born 9 April 1990) is a Tunisian team handball player. She plays on the Tunisian national team, and participated at the 2011 World Women's Handball Championship in Brazil.
