= Jumelle Okoko =

Congolese handball player

Personal information
- Nationality: Congolese
- Born: 26 December 1984 (age 41)
- Height: 1.68 m (5 ft 6 in)

Sport
- Sport: Handball
- Position: Right back
- Current club: Blavozy RB
National team
- Years: Team
- 2013-: DR Congo

Jumelle Okoko (born 26 December 1984) is a Congolese handball player. She plays for the club Blavozy RB and for the DR Congo national team. She represented DR Congo at the 2013 World Women's Handball Championship in Serbia, where DR Congo placed 20th.
