= Echraf Abdallah =

Tunisian handball player

Personal information
- Nationality: Tunisian
- Born: 14 January 1987 (age 39) Rejiche, Tunisia
- Height: 1.81 m (5 ft 11 in)

Sport
- Sport: Handball
- Position: Goalkeeper
- Current club: Megrine Sport HBF
- Number: 87
National team
Years	Team	Apps	(Gls)
–	Tunisia	54	(0)

Echraf Abdallah (born 14 January 1987) is a Tunisian handball player for Megrine Sport HBF and the Tunisian national team.

== Handball career ==
She participated at the 2011 World Women's Handball Championship in Brazil, the 2013 World Women's Handball Championship in Serbia and 2015 World Women's Handball Championship in Denmark.
