= Grace Shokkos =

Congolese handball player

Personal information
- Full name: Grace Shokkos Songa
- Nationality: Congolese
- Born: 4 August 1992 (age 34) Bois-Colombes, France
- Height: 1.73 m (5 ft 8 in)

Sport
- Sport: Handball
- Position: Centre back

Youth career
- Years: Team
- 2007-2011: Nantes Atlantique Handball

Senior clubs
- Years: Team
- 2009-?: Lomme Lille MHB
- 2013: Poitiers Handball
- 2015-2019: Handball Plan-de-Cuques
- 2019-2020: US Alfortville
- 2020-: HBC Conflans
National team
- Years: Team
- –: DR Congo

Grace Shokkos (born 4 August 1992) is a Congolese-French handball player for Poitiers Handball and the DR Congo national team. She represented DR Congo at the 2013 World Women's Handball Championship in Serbia, where DR Congo placed 20th.
