= Olga Milemba =

Congolese handball player

Personal information
- Nationality: Congolese
- Born: 27 July 1984 (age 42)
- Height: 1.69 m (5 ft 7 in)

Sport
- Sport: Handball
- Position: Right wing
- Current club: Héritage Kinshasa
National team
- Years: Team
- –: DR Congo

Olga Milemba (born 27 July 1984) is a Congolese handball player. She plays for the club Héritage Kinshasa and on the DR Congo national team. She represented DR Congo at the 2013 World Women's Handball Championship in Serbia, where DR Congo placed 20th.
