= Clémence Matutu =

Congolese handball player

Personal information
- Full name: Clémence Matutu Luwemba
- Nationality: Congolese
- Born: 26 April 1992 (age 34)
- Height: 1.59 m (5 ft 3 in)

Sport
- Sport: Handball
- Position: Left wing
- Current club: Serris Val d'Europe

Senior clubs
- Years: Team
- –: PEC Handball
- –: Serris Val d'Europe
National team
- Years: Team
- –: DR Congo

Clémence Matutu Luwemba (born 26 April 1992) is a Congolese handball player for Serris Val d'Europe and the DR Congo national team. She represented DR Congo at the 2013 World Women's Handball Championship in Serbia, where DR Congo placed 20th.
