= Ouided Kilani =

Tunisian team handball player (born 1982)

Personal information
- Nationality: Tunisian
- Born: 15 June 1982 (age 44)
- Height: 1.76 m (5 ft 9 in)

Sport
- Sport: Handball
- Position: Right back
- Current club: Colombelles Handball
National team
Years	Team	Apps	(Gls)
–	Tunisia	163	(235)

Ouided Kilani (born 1982) is a Tunisian team handball player. She plays on the Tunisian national team, and participated at the 2011 World Women's Handball Championship in Brazil.
