= Souhila Benaicha =

Algerian handball player (born 1988)

Personal information
- Nationality: Algerian
- Born: 11 May 1988 (age 38)
- Height: 1.82 m (6 ft 0 in)

Sport
- Sport: Handball
- Position: Left back
- Current club: HBC El Biar
National team
| Years | Team | Apps | (Gls) |
| – | Algeria | 65 | (50) |

Souhila Benaicha (born 11 May 1988) is an Algerian team handball player. She plays for the club Biar, and on the Algerian National Team.

== Career ==
She represented Algeria at the 2013 World Women's Handball Championship in Serbia, where the Algerian team placed 22nd.
