= Constance Louoba =

Congolese handball player

Personal information
- Nationality: Congolese
- Born: 14 June 1981 (age 45)
- Height: 1.68 m (5 ft 6 in)

Sport
- Sport: Handball
- Position: Centre back
- Current club: Blavozy RB
National team
- Years: Team
- –: DR Congo

Constance Louoba (born 14 June 1981) is a team handball player from the Democratic Republic of the Congo. She plays for the club Blavozy RB and on the DR Congo national team. She represented DR Congo at the 2013 World Women's Handball Championship in Serbia, where DR Congo placed 20th.
