= Apopie Lusamba =

Congolese handball player

Personal information
- Full name: Apopie Lusamba Puna
- Nationality: Congolese
- Born: 20 May 1985 (age 41)
- Height: 1.68 m (5 ft 6 in)

Sport
- Sport: Handball
- Position: Pivot
- Current club: USM Gagny

Youth career
- Years: Team
- –: Metz Handball

Senior clubs
- Years: Team
- -2008: Metz Handball Reserves
- 2008-2009: Yutz HBF
- 2009-2010: Nantes HB
- 2010-2011: Saint-Amand-les-Eaux HB
- 2010-?: Stella Saint-Maur Handball
- –: USM Gagny
National team
- Years: Team
- –: DR Congo

Apopie Lusamba (born 20 May 1985) is a French-Congolese handball player. She plays for the club Gagny and on the DR Congo national team. She represented DR Congo at the 2013 World Women's Handball Championship in Serbia, where DR Congo placed 20th.
