= Refka Hlaili =

Tunisian handball player (born 1990)

Personal information
- Nationality: Tunisian
- Born: 18 April 1990 (age 36)
- Height: 1.69 m (5 ft 7 in)

Sport
- Sport: Handball
- Position: Left wing
- Current club: ASF Sahel
National team
Years	Team	Apps	(Gls)
–	Tunisia	41	(81)

Refka Hlaili (born 18 April 1990) is a Tunisian handball player. She plays for the club Sahel, and on the Tunisian national team. She represented Tunisia at the 2013 World Women's Handball Championship in Serbia.
