= Samia Sehabi =

Algerian handball player (born 1981)

Personal information
- Nationality: Algerian
- Born: 9 January 1981 (age 45)
- Height: 1.73 m (5 ft 8 in)

Sport
- Sport: Handball
- Position: Goalkeeper
- Current club: GS Pétroliers
National team
Years	Team	Apps	(Gls)
–	Algeria	38	(1)

Samia Sehabi (born 9 January 1981) is an Algerian team handball goalkeeper. She plays for the club GS Pétroliers, and on the Algerian national team. She competed at the 2013 World Women's Handball Championship in Serbia, where Algeria placed 22nd.
