= Célestin Mpoua =

Congolese handball coach (1957-2023

Celestin Mpoua Nkoua (12 November 1957 - 19 June 2023) was a Congolese handball coach.

He coached the DR Congo women's national team from 2013 to 2020. He coached the team for the 2013, 2015 and 2019 World Championships.
