= Lydia Musonda Kasangala =

Congolese handball player

Personal information
- Nationality: Congolese
- Born: 6 May 1988 (age 38)
- Height: 1.80 m (5 ft 11 in)

Sport
- Sport: Handball
- Position: Left back
- Current club: Mikishi Lubumbashi
National team
- Years: Team
- –: DR Congo
Medal record
Women's handball
Representing the Democratic Republic of the Congo
African Games
Bronze medal – third place	2019 Rabat	Team

Lydia Musonda Kasangala (born 6 May 1988) is a Congolese handball player for Mikishi Lubumbashi and the DR Congo national team.

She represented DR Congo at the 2013 World Women's Handball Championship in Serbia, where DR Congo placed 20th.
