= Wang Xiaohua (handballer) =

Chinese handball player (born 1993)

Personal information
- Nationality: Chinese
- Born: 15 April 1993 (age 33)
- Height: 1.86 m (6 ft 1 in)

Sport
- Sport: Handball
- Position: Goalkeeper
- Current club: Jiangsu
National team
| Years | Team | Apps | (Gls) |
| – | China | 50 | (0) |

Wang Xiaohua (born 15 April 1993) is a Chinese handball goalkeeper for Jiangsu and the Chinese national team.

She represented China at the 2013 World Women's Handball Championship in Serbia, where the Chinese team placed 18th.
