= Faten Yahiaoui =

Tunisian handball player

Personal information
- Nationality: Tunisian
- Born: 1 May 1985 (age 41) Cluses, France
- Height: 1.75 m (5 ft 9 in)

Sport
- Sport: Handball
- Position: Pivot

Senior clubs
- Years: Team
- 2003-2008: Bourg-de-Péage Drôme Handball
- 2008-2011: Handball Plan-de-Cuques
- 2011-2013: Noisy-le-Grand Handball
- 2013-2014: HBC Brest
National team
Years	Team	Apps	(Gls)
2009-2014	Tunisia	12	(2)

Faten Yahiaoui (born 1985) is a Tunisian/French former team handball player. She played on the Tunisian national team, and participated at the 2011 World Women's Handball Championship in Brazil and the 2013 World Women's Handball Championship in Serbia.
