= Lamia Izem =

Algerian handball player (born 1980)

Personal information
- Nationality: Algerian
- Born: 3 September 1980 (age 46)
- Height: 1.78 m (5 ft 10 in)

Sport
- Sport: Handball
- Position: Right back
- Current club: GS Pétroliers
National team
Years	Team	Apps	(Gls)
–	Algeria	60	(30)

Lamia Izem (born 3 September 1980) is an Algerian team handball player. She plays for the club GS Pétroliers, and on the Algerian national team. She represented Algeria at the 2013 World Women's Handball Championship in Serbia, where the Algerian team placed 22nd.
