= Noura Ben Slama =

Tunisian handball player (born 1985)

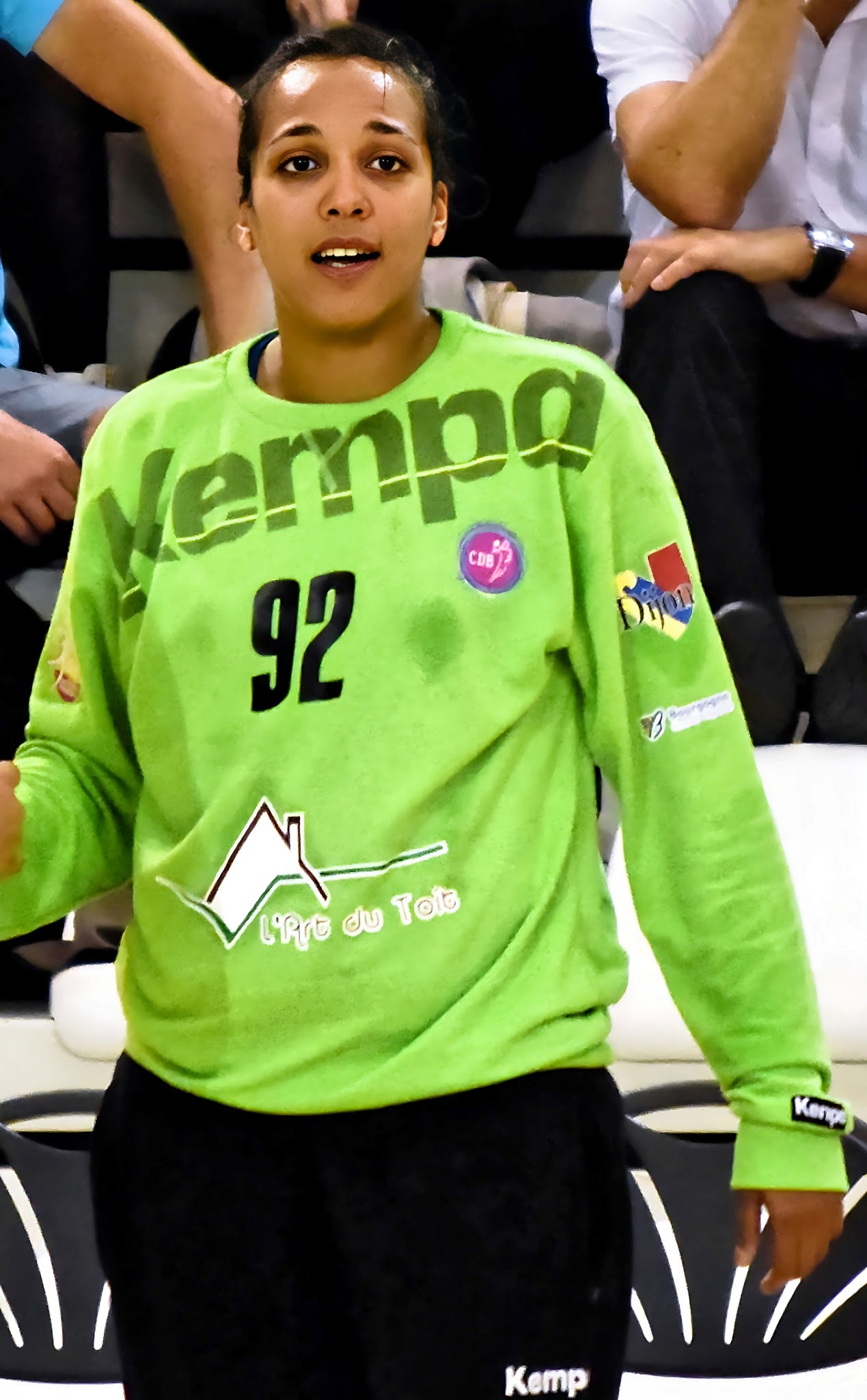
- Noura Ben Slama in 2014

Personal information
- Nationality: Tunisian
- Born: 23 February 1985 (age 41) Nogent-sur-Marne, France
- Height: 1.76 m (5 ft 9 in)

Sport
- Sport: Handball
- Position: Goalkeeper
- Current club: Cercle Dijon Bourgogne
- Number: 92

Senior clubs
- Years: Team
- 2006-2009: Issy Paris Hand
- 2009-2011: BM Alcobendas
- 2012-2013: CA Béglais
- 2013-: Cercle Dijon Bourgogne
National team
Years	Team	Apps	(Gls)
–	Tunisia	39	(0)

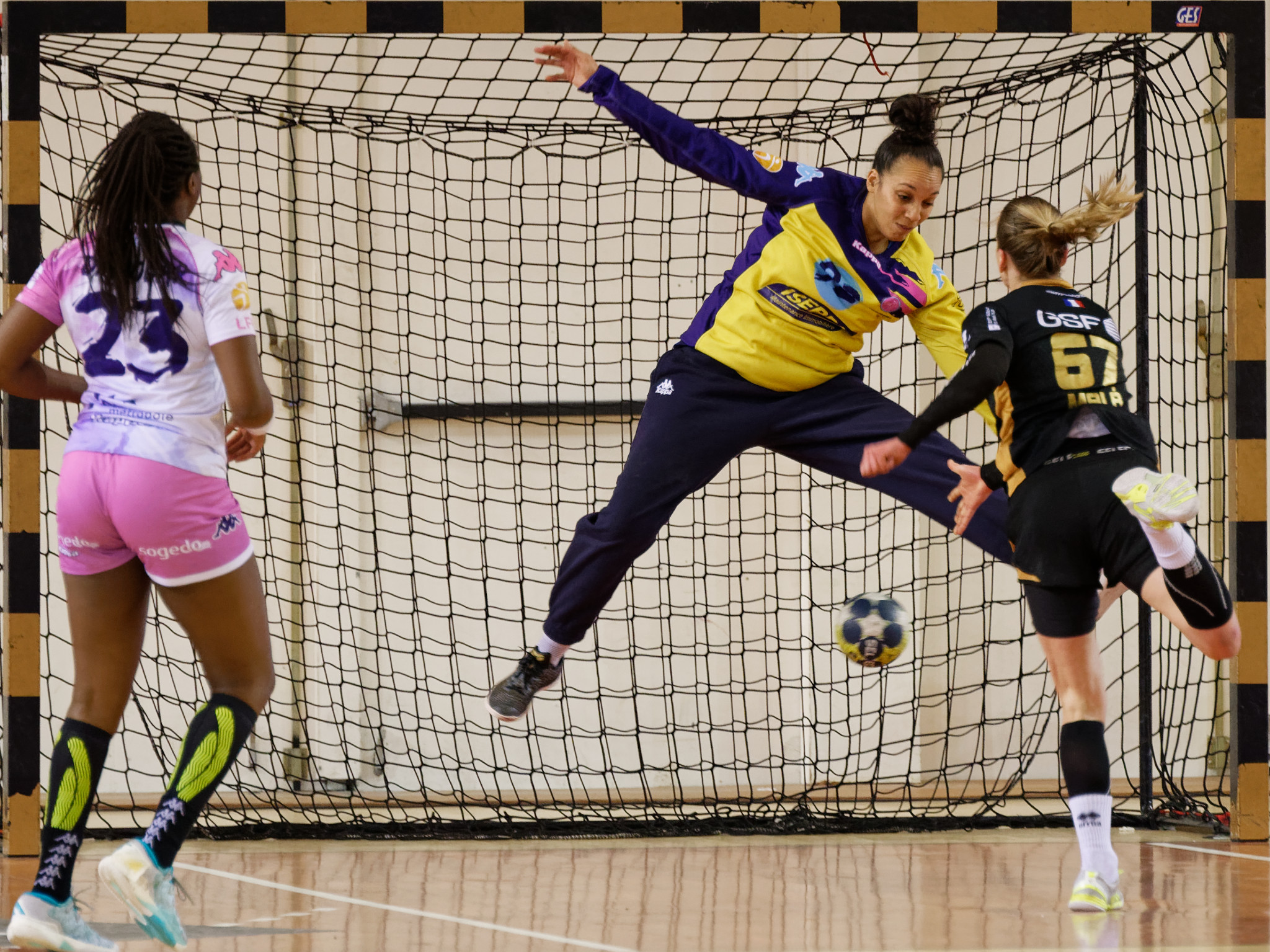
Feb. 25, 2018.

Noura Ben Slama (born 23 February 1985) is a Tunisian handball player. She plays for the club Cercle Dijon Bourgogne and on the Tunisian national team. She represented Tunisia at the 2013 World Women's Handball Championship in Serbia.
