= Consolate Feza =

Congolese handball player

Personal information
- Full name: Consolate Feza Mwange
- Nationality: Congolese
- Born: 23 March 1985 (age 41)
- Height: 1.68 m (5 ft 6 in)

Sport
- Sport: Handball
- Position: Centre back
- Current club: Mikishi Lubumbashi
National team
- Years: Team
- –: DR Congo
Medal record
Women's handball
Representing the Democratic Republic of the Congo
African Games
| Bronze medal – third place | 2019 Rabat | Team |

Consolate Feza Mwange (born 23 March 1985) is a Congolese handball player for Mikishi Lubumbashi and the DR Congo national team. She represented DR Congo at the 2013 World Women's Handball Championship in Serbia, where DR Congo placed 20th.
