= Fadia Omrani =

Tunisian handball player

Personal information
- Nationality: Tunisian
- Born: 27 February 1984 (age 42)
- Height: 1.71 m (5 ft 7 in)

Sport
- Sport: Handball
- Position: Goalkeeper
- Current club: Club Africain
- Number: 16
National team
| Years | Team | Apps | (Gls) |
| – | Tunisia | 67 | (0) |
Medal record
African Championship
| Bronze medal – third place | 2021 Yaoundé |
| Bronze medal – third place | 2024 Kinshasa |

Fadia Omrani (born 27 February 1984) is a Tunisian handball player for Club Africain and the Tunisian national team.

She represented Tunisia at the 2013 World Women's Handball Championship in Serbia.
