= Fatima Boussora =

Algerian handball player (born 1983)

Personal information
- Nationality: Algerian
- Born: 3 July 1983 (age 43)
- Height: 1.74 m (5 ft 9 in)

Sport
- Sport: Handball
- Position: Goalkeeper
- Current club: HBC El Biar
National team
Years	Team	Apps	(Gls)
–	Algeria	12	(0)

Fatima Boussora (born 3 July 1983) is an Algerian handball player for HBC El Biar and the Algerian national team.
