= Maroua Dhaouadi =

Tunisian handball player (born 1992)

Personal information
- Nationality: Tunisian
- Born: 22 May 1992 (age 34)
- Height: 1.75 m (5 ft 9 in)

Sport
- Sport: Handball
- Position: Left back
- Current club: HBC Nantes
National team
Years	Team	Apps	(Gls)
–	Tunisia	60	(287)
Medal record
African Championship
Bronze medal – third place	2021 Yaoundé
Bronze medal – third place	2024 Kinshasa

Maroua Dhaouadi (born May 22, 1992) is a Tunisian team handball player. She plays on the Tunisian national team, and participated at the 2011 World Women's Handball Championship in Brazil.

In 2012, she competed at the 2012 Women's Junior World Handball Championship in the Czech Republic.
