= Teresa Almeida =

Angolan handball player

Personal information
- Full name: Teresa Patricia Almeida
- Nationality: Angolan
- Born: 5 April 1988 (age 38) Luanda, Angola
- Height: 1.84 m (6 ft 0 in)

Sport
- Sport: Handball
- Position: Goalkeeper
- Current club: Petro de Luanda
- Number: 1

Senior clubs
- Years: Team
- –: Petro de Luanda
National team
| Years | Team | Apps | (Gls) |
| 2013– | Angola | 99 | (0) |
Medal record
African Championship
| Gold medal – first place | 2016 Luanda |
| Gold medal – first place | 2018 Brazzaville |
| Gold medal – first place | 2021 Yaoundé |
| Gold medal – first place | 2022 Dakar |
African Games
| Gold medal – first place | 2015 Brazzaville | Team |
- Updated on 30 October 2023

Teresa Patricia De Almeida (born 5 April 1988) nicknamed Bá is an Angolan handball player for Petro de Luanda and the Angolan national team.

She represented Angola at the 2013 World Women's Handball Championship in Serbia, the 2016 Summer Olympics, and the 2020 Summer Olympics.

== Achievements ==
- Carpathian Trophy:
  - Winner: 2019
