= Lurdes Monteiro =

Angolan handball player

Personal information
- Full name: Lurdes Marcelina Manuel Monteiro
- Nationality: Angolan
- Born: 11 July 1984 (age 42)
- Height: 1.70 m (5 ft 7 in)

Sport
- Sport: Handball
- Position: Centre back
- Current club: Primeiro de Agosto
- Number: 8
National team
| Years | Team | Apps | (Gls) |
| – | Angola | 32 | (49) |
Medal record
African Handball Championship
| Gold medal – first place | Luanda 2016 | National Team |
African Games
| Gold medal – first place | Brazzaville 2015 | National Team |

Lurdes Marcelina Manuel Monteiro (born 11 July 1984) is an Angolan handball player. She plays for the club Primeiro de Agosto and on the Angolan national team. She represented Angola at the 2013 World Women's Handball Championship in Serbia and at the 2016 Summer Olympics.
