= Fatma Sfar Ben Chaker =

Tunisian handball player

Fatma Sfar Ben Chker
Personal information
- Nationality: Tunisian
- Born: 20 March 1994 (age 32) Mahdia, Tunisia
- Height: 1.70 m (5 ft 7 in)

Sport
- Sport: Handball
- Position: Right wing
- Current club: ASF Mahdia

Senior clubs
- Years: Team
- 2009–: ASF Mahdia
National team
Years	Team	Apps	(Gls)
2011–	Tunisia	76	(198)

Fatma Sfar Ben Chaker (born 20 March 1994) is a Tunisian handball player. She plays for the ASF Mahdia and in the Tunisian national team. She represented Tunisia at the 2013 World Women's Handball Championship in Serbia and the 2011 Pan Arab Games in Qatar. She was part of the team winning 2014 African Women's Handball Championship in Algeria.
