= Luisa Makubanza =

Congolese handball player

Personal information
- Nationality: Congolese
- Born: 28 September 1992 (age 34)
- Height: 1.80 m (5 ft 11 in)

Sport
- Sport: Handball
- Position: Goalkeeper

Youth career
- Years: Team
- 2007-2011: Nantes Atlantique Handball

Senior clubs
- Years: Team
- 2011-2014: Nantes Atlantique Handball
- 2014-2015: Primeiro de Agosto
- 2017-: St-Sébastien Sud Loire HB
National team
- Years: Team
- 2013-: DR Congo

Luisa Makubanza, sometimes called Louise Makubanza (born 28 September 1992) is a Congolese handball goalkeeper. She plays for the club Primeiro de Agosto, and on the DR Congo national team. She represented DR Congo at the 2013 World Women's Handball Championship in Serbia, where DR Congo placed 20th.
