= Magda Cazanga =

Angolan handball player (born 1991)

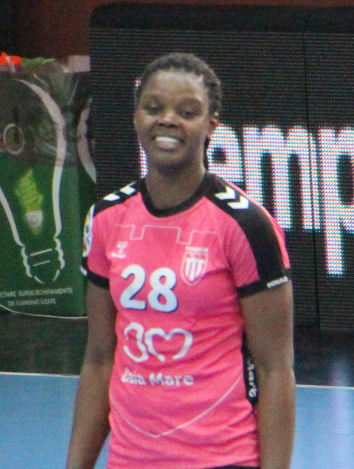

Personal information
- Full name: Magda Alfredo Cazanga
- Nationality: Angolan
- Born: 28 May 1991 (age 35) Luanda, Angola
- Height: 1.77 m (5 ft 10 in)

Sport
- Sport: Handball
- Position: Left back
- Current club: CS Minaur Baia Mare
- Number: 28

Senior clubs
- Years: Team
- -2019: Atletico Petroleos de Luanda
- 2019-2021: Balonmano Salud Tenerife
- 2021-2022: CS Universitar Știința București
- 2022-2025: CS Minaur Baia Mare
- 2025-: CSM Slatina
National team
Years	Team	Apps	(Gls)
–	Angola	63	(110)
Medal record
African Championship
Gold medal – first place	2016 Luanda
Gold medal – first place	2018 Brazzaville
Gold medal – first place	2021 Yaoundé
Gold medal – first place	2022 Dakar
Gold medal – first place	2024 Kinshasa
- Updated on 19 July 2025

Magda Alfredo Cazanga (born 28 May 1991) is an Angolan handball player for Romanian handball club CSM Slatina and the Angolan national team.

She competed for the Angolan team at the 2012 Summer Olympics in London and at the 2016 Summer Olympics in Rio de Janeiro.

== Achievements ==
- Carpathian Trophy:
  - Winner: 2019
