= Ines Jaouadi =

Tunisian handball player

Personal information
- Nationality: Tunisian
- Born: 15 September 1989 (age 37)
- Height: 1.82 m (6 ft 0 in)

Sport
- Sport: Handball
- Position: Left back
- Current club: ASF Teboulba
National team
Years	Team	Apps	(Gls)
–	Tunisia	99	(235)

Ines Jaouadi (born 15 September 1989) is a Tunisian handball player for ASF Teboulba and the Tunisian national team.

She participated at the 2011 World Women's Handball Championship in Brazil.
