= Joelma Viegas =

Angolan handball player

Personal information
- Full name: Joelma Patrícia Viegas
- Nationality: Angolan
- Born: 15 October 1986 (age 40) Luanda, Angola
- Height: 1.70 m (5 ft 7 in)

Sport
- Sport: Handball
- Position: Left wing
- Current club: Primeiro de Agosto
- Number: 13
National team
Years	Team	Apps	(Gls)
–	Angola	24	(40)
Medal record
African Championship
Gold medal – first place	Salé 2012	National Team
Gold medal – first place	Luanda 2016	National Team
All-Africa Games
Gold medal – first place	Maputo 2011	National Team

Joelma Patrícia da Cunha Viegas a.k.a. Cajó, (born October 15, 1986) is a team handball player from Angola. She plays on the Angola women's national handball team, and participated at the 2011 World Women's Handball Championship in Brazil and the 2012 Summer Olympics.

At the club level, she plays for Angolan side Primeiro de Agosto at the Angolan Handball league
