= Manel Kouki =

Tunisian handball player

Personal information
- Nationality: Tunisian
- Born: 4 February 1988 (age 38)
- Height: 1.80 m (5 ft 11 in)

Sport
- Sport: Handball
- Position: Pivot
- Current club: Stella Sports HB
National team
Years	Team	Apps	(Gls)
–	Tunisia	88	(191)

Manel Kouki (born 4 February 1988) is a Tunisian handball player for Stella Sports HB and the Tunisian national team.

She represented Tunisia at the 2013 World Women's Handball Championship in Serbia.
