= Sihem Hemissi =

Algerian handball player (born 1985)

Personal information
- Nationality: Algerian
- Born: 1 June 1985 (age 41) Aïn Oulmene, Algeria
- Height: 1.89 m (6 ft 2 in)

Sport
- Sport: Handball
- Position: Left back
- Current club: GS Pétroliers
National team
Years	Team	Apps	(Gls)
–	Algeria	61	(75)

Sihem Hemissi (born 1 June 1985) is an Algerian team handball player. She plays for the club GS Pétroliers, and on the Algerian national team. She represented Algeria at the 2013 World Women's Handball Championship in Serbia, where the Algerian team placed 22nd.
