= Handball at the Bolivarian Games =

Handball has been a Bolivarian Games event since 2013 in Trujillo, Peru.

== Men ==
=== Summary ===
| Year | Host | Final | | | Third place match | | |
| Year | Host | Champion | Score | Runner-up | Third place | Score | Fourth place |
|---|---|---|---|---|---|---|---|
| 2013; Details | (Peru); Trujillo / Chiclayo | Venezuela | No playoffs | Colombia | Guatemala | No playoffs | Ecuador |
| 2017; Details | (Colombia); Santa Marta | Chile | No playoffs | Colombia | Venezuela | No playoffs | Peru |
| 2022; Details | (Colombia); Valledupar/Chía | Chile | No playoffs | Venezuela | Colombia | No playoffs | Dominican Republic |

=== Medal table ===
| Rank | Nation | Gold | Silver | Bronze | Total |
|---|---|---|---|---|---|
| 1 | Chile | 2 | 0 | 0 | 2 |
| 2 | Venezuela | 1 | 1 | 1 | 3 |
| 3 | Colombia | 0 | 2 | 1 | 3 |
| 4 | Guatemala | 0 | 0 | 1 | 1 |
| Totals (4 entries) | | 3 | 3 | 3 | 9 |

=== Participating nations ===
| Nation | (Peru) 2013 | (Colombia) 2017 | (Colombia) 2022 | Years |
|---|---|---|---|---|
| Bolivia | – | 5th | – | 1 |
| Chile | – | 1st | 1st | 2 |
| Colombia | 2nd | 2nd | 3rd | 3 |
| Dominican Republic | – | – | 4th | 1 |
| Ecuador | 4th | – | – | 1 |
| Guatemala | 3rd | – | – | 1 |
| Peru | 5th | 4th | 5th | 3 |
| Venezuela | 1st | 3rd | 2nd | 3 |
| Total | 5 | 5 | 5 | |

== Women ==
=== Summary ===
| Year | Host | Final | | | Third place match | | |
| Year | Host | Champion | Score | Runner-up | Third place | Score | Fourth place |
|---|---|---|---|---|---|---|---|
| 2013; Details | (Peru); Trujillo / Chiclayo | Paraguay | No playoffs | Chile | Venezuela | No playoffs | Guatemala |
| 2017; Details | (Colombia); Santa Marta | Paraguay | No playoffs | Chile | Venezuela | No playoffs | Colombia |
| 2022; Details | (Colombia); Valledupar/Chía | Paraguay | 25–24 | Chile | Dominican Republic | 31–17 | Colombia |

=== Medal table ===
| Rank | Nation | Gold | Silver | Bronze | Total |
|---|---|---|---|---|---|
| 1 | Paraguay | 3 | 0 | 0 | 3 |
| 2 | Chile | 0 | 3 | 0 | 3 |
| 3 | Venezuela | 0 | 0 | 2 | 2 |
| 4 | Dominican Republic | 0 | 0 | 1 | 1 |
| Totals (4 entries) | | 3 | 3 | 3 | 9 |

=== Participating nations ===
| Nation | (Peru) 2013 | (Colombia) 2017 | (Colombia) 2022 | Years |
|---|---|---|---|---|
| Bolivia | – | 6th | 6th | 2 |
| Chile | 2nd | 2nd | 2nd | 3 |
| Colombia | – | 4th | 4th | 2 |
| Ecuador | 5th | – | – | 1 |
| Guatemala | 4th | – | – | 1 |
| Paraguay | 1st | 1st | 1st | 3 |
| Peru | 6th | 5th | 7th | 3 |
| Dominican Republic | – | – | 3rd | 1 |
| Venezuela | 3rd | 3rd | 5th | 3 |
| Total | 6 | 6 | 7 | |
