= 2015 World Women's Handball Championship squads =

This article displays the squads for the 2015 World Women's Handball Championship. Each team consists of up to 28 players, of whom 16 may be fielded for each match.

Age, club, caps and goals as of 5 December 2015.

== Group A ==
=== Denmark ===
A 19-player squad was announced on 9 November 2015. On 21 November 2015, Simone Böhme replaced Anne Mette Pedersen due to a small injury, while Pedersen maybe ready for the tournament. On 25 November 2015, the squad was reduced to 17 players. On 29 November 2015, the squad was reduced to 15 players, leaving one spot open. Pedersen was added back on 5 December 2015. On 7 December, Lotte Grigel had to withdraw because of a serious injury, and Anna Sophie Okkels was announced as her replacement. On 17 December, Mette Iversen Sahlholdt replaced Anna Sophie Okkels due to a minor injury on Sandra Toft.

Head coach: Klavs Bruun Jørgensen

No.	Pos.	Name	Date of birth (age)	Height	App.	Goals	Club
1	GK	Sandra Toft	18 October 1989 (aged 26)	1.76 m	57	0	(Norway) Larvik HK
2	LB	Rikke Skov	7 September 1980 (aged 35)	1.81 m	140	379	(Denmark) Viborg HK
4	CB	Anna Sophie Okkels	23 March 1990 (aged 25)	1.78 m	19	30	(Denmark) SK Aarhus
6	RW	Anne Mette Pedersen	25 October 1992 (aged 23)	1.75 m	11	18	(Denmark) København Håndbold
7	LW	Maria Fisker	3 October 1990 (aged 25)	1.70 m	60	167	(Romania) CSM București
8	LB	Anne Mette Hansen	25 August 1994 (aged 21)	1.77 m	33	49	(Denmark) København Håndbold
11	P	Mette Gravholt	12 December 1984 (aged 30)	1.72 m	53	131	(Denmark) Nykøbing Falster
14	CB	Lotte Grigel	5 April 1991 (aged 24)	1.65 m	55	102	(Russia) Rostov-Don
15	LB	Pernille Holst Holmsgaard	6 September 1984 (aged 31)	1.84 m	123	118	(Denmark) København Håndbold
16	GK	Mette Iversen Sahlholdt	22 July 1977 (aged 38)	1.77 m	42	0	(Denmark) Nykøbing Falster
17	P	Stine Bodholt Nielsen	8 November 1989 (aged 26)	1.76 m	11	11	(Denmark) Team Esbjerg
19	RB	Line Jørgensen	31 December 1989 (aged 25)	1.86 m	124	314	(Romania) CSM București
20	GK	Rikke Poulsen	20 April 1986 (aged 29)	1.73 m	59	0	(Denmark) Viborg HK
21	CB	Kristina Kristiansen	13 July 1989 (aged 26)	1.63 m	116	328	(Denmark) Nykøbing Falster
23	LW	Ann Grete Nørgaard	15 September 1983 (aged 32)	1.62 m	126	522	(Denmark) Viborg HK
25	RW	Trine Østergaard Jensen	17 October 1991 (aged 24)	1.65 m	49	68	(Denmark) FC Midtjylland
27	RB	Louise Burgaard	17 October 1992 (aged 23)	1.76 m	71	180	(Denmark) FC Midtjylland
28	LB	Stine Jørgensen	3 September 1990 (aged 25)	1.80 m	79	193	(Denmark) FC Midtjylland

=== Hungary ===
A 19-player squad was announced on 23 November 2015. It was reduced to 18 on 2 December 2015. The final squad was revealed on 5 December 2015.

Head coach: András Németh

No.	Pos.	Name	Date of birth (age)	Height	App.	Goals	Club
2	LB	Szandra Zácsik	22 April 1990 (aged 25)	1.83 m	32	98	(Hungary) Ferencvárosi TC
5	LB	Krisztina Triscsuk	17 July 1985 (aged 30)	1.76 m	35	95	(Hungary) Dunaújvárosi Kohász KA
7	CB	Zita Szucsánszki	22 May 1987 (aged 28)	1.72 m	121	368	(Hungary) Ferencvárosi TC
8	CB	Anikó Kovacsics	29 August 1991 (aged 24)	1.70 m	75	143	(Hungary) Győri ETO KC
10	LB	Anita Bulath	20 September 1983 (aged 32)	1.77 m	101	237	(Hungary) Dunaújvárosi Kohász KA
13	CB	Anita Görbicz	13 May 1983 (aged 32)	1.73 m	205	1000	(Hungary) Győri ETO KC
16	GK	Blanka Bíró	22 September 1994 (aged 21)	1.85 m	22	1	(Hungary) Váci NKSE
18	P	Piroska Szamoránsky	9 July 1986 (aged 29)	1.71 m	137	270	(Hungary) Ferencvárosi TC
21	GK	Éva Kiss	10 July 1987 (aged 28)	1.89 m	58	1	(Hungary) Győri ETO KC
22	RW	Bernadett Bódi	9 March 1986 (aged 29)	1.75 m	113	198	(Hungary) Győri ETO KC
23	LB	Klára Szekeres	1 December 1987 (aged 28)	1.83 m	59	24	(Hungary) Ferencvárosi TC
24	P	Szabina Mayer	24 March 1988 (aged 27)	1.70 m	31	41	(Hungary) Fehérvár KC
30	RB	Szimonetta Planéta	12 December 1993 (aged 21)	1.98 m	31	38	(Hungary) Győri ETO KC
31	LB	Dóra Hornyák	24 January 1992 (aged 23)	1.76 m	8	10	(Hungary) FTC-Rail Cargo Hungaria
44	LW	Ildikó Erdősi	14 September 1989 (aged 26)	1.71 m	19	43	(Hungary) Siófok KC
83	RW	Mónika Kovacsicz	20 November 1983 (aged 32)	1.71 m	149	342	(Hungary) Ferencvárosi TC
87	RB	Zsuzsanna Tomori	18 June 1987 (aged 28)	1.86 m	142	392	(Hungary) Győri ETO KC

=== Japan ===
An 18-player squad was announced on 26 November 2015.

Head coach: Masamichi Kuriyama

No.	Pos.	Name	Date of birth (age)	Height	App.	Goals	Club
1	GK	Kimiko Hida	26 September 1977 (aged 38)	1.70 m	99	0	(Japan) Sony Semiconductor
3	RW	Megumi Honda	14 July 1986 (aged 29)	1.59 m	74	169	(Japan) Sony Semiconductor
5	CB	Mineko Tanaka	14 January 1975 (aged 40)	1.60 m	143	607	(Japan) Sony Semiconductor
6	RB	Mikako Ishino	11 November 1988 (aged 27)	1.67 m	24	33	(Japan) Hokkoku Bank
9	P	Kaoru Yokoshima	11 December 1985 (aged 29)	1.62 m	52	124	(Japan) Hokkoku Bank
10	RB	Shio Fujii	27 March 1985 (aged 30)	1.64 m	110	555	Free agent
14	CB	Aya Yokoshima	3 July 1990 (aged 25)	1.62 m	13	33	(Japan) Hokkoku Bank
15	RB	Yui Sunami	7 June 1991 (aged 24)	1.62 m	17	52	(Japan) Hokkoku Bank
17	LB	Yuko Arihama	18 August 1984 (aged 31)	1.78 m	133	345	(Japan) Omron
18	LW	Yuki Tanabe	25 August 1989 (aged 26)	1.70 m	30	94	(Hungary) Fehérvár KC
19	RW	Ayaka Ikehara	24 September 1990 (aged 25)	1.57 m	11	15	(Japan) MIE violet' IRIS
20	CB	Mayuko Ishitate	18 January 1987 (aged 28)	1.66 m	66	140	(Hungary) Fehérvár KC
22	GK	Kaori Fujima	6 July 1982 (aged 33)	1.73 m	79	0	(Japan) Omron
24	LB	Nozomi Hara	9 March 1991 (aged 24)	1.70 m	34	84	(Japan) MIE violet' IRIS
26	CB	Anna Kawamura	26 October 1991 (aged 24)	1.67 m	13	18	(Japan) Sony Semiconductor
28	P	Shiori Nagata	24 October 1987 (aged 28)	1.71 m	54	38	(Japan) Omron
29	LW	Anri Matsumura	21 June 1991 (aged 24)	1.68 m	14	61	(Japan) Hiroshima Maple Reds
30	GK	Sakura Hauge	7 January 1987 (aged 28)	1.74 m	3	0	(Norway) Vipers Kristiansand

=== Montenegro ===
A 17-player squad was announced on 16 November 2015.

Head coach: Dragan Adžić

No.	Pos.	Name	Date of birth (age)	Height	App.	Goals	Club
1	GK	Marina Vukčević	24 August 1993 (aged 22)	1.78 m	76	0	(France) Metz Handball
3	LW	Biljana Pavićević	12 May 1988 (aged 27)	1.70 m	41	61	(Montenegro) ŽRK Budućnost Podgorica
4	RW	Jovanka Radičević	23 October 1986 (aged 29)	1.69 m	120	621	(North Macedonia) ŽRK Vardar
8	LB	Marija Jovanović	26 December 1985 (aged 29)	1.82 m	115	467	(France) Issy-Paris Hand
9	LB	Djurdjina Jauković	24 February 1997 (aged 18)	1.85 m	17	19	(Montenegro) ŽRK Budućnost Podgorica
12	GK	Alma Hasanić	13 May 1989 (aged 26)	1.76 m	4	0	(Norway) Larvik HK
14	LW	Ivona Pavićević	21 April 1996 (aged 19)	1.67 m	5	0	(Montenegro) ŽRK Budućnost Podgorica
15	RB	Andrea Klikovac	5 May 1991 (aged 24)	1.74 m	36	9	(North Macedonia) ŽRK Vardar
22	GK	Sonja Barjaktarović	11 September 1986 (aged 29)	1.80 m	115	0	(Turkey) Bursa
26	P	Suzana Lazović	28 January 1992 (aged 23)	1.76 m	83	100	(Montenegro) ŽRK Budućnost Podgorica
32	RB	Katarina Bulatović	15 November 1984 (aged 31)	1.86 m	56	337	(Montenegro) ŽRK Budućnost Podgorica
66	P	Ema Ramusović	28 November 1996 (aged 19)	1.82 m	16	9	(Montenegro) ŽRK Budućnost Podgorica
77	LW	Majda Mehmedović	25 May 1990 (aged 25)	1.69 m	81	159	(Montenegro) ŽRK Budućnost Podgorica
80	CB	Jelena Despotović	30 April 1994 (aged 21)	1.83 m	33	21	(Hungary) Debreceni VSC
90	LB	Milena Knežević	12 March 1990 (aged 25)	1.78 m	108	300	(Montenegro) ŽRK Budućnost Podgorica
96	CB	Itana Grbić	1 September 1996 (aged 19)	1.69 m	2	1	(North Macedonia) ŽRK Vardar

=== Serbia ===
A 17-player squad was announced on 19 November 2015.

Head coach: Saša Bošković

No.	Pos.	Name	Date of birth (age)	Height	App.	Goals	Club
2	LW	Sanja Radosavljević	15 January 1994 (aged 21)	1.70 m	18	25	(Serbia) ŽRK Radnički Kragujevac
3	RW	Katarina Krpež Šlezak	9 May 1988 (aged 27)	1.68 m	103	211	(Hungary) Érdi VSE
5	LB	Jelena Trifunović	4 August 1991 (aged 24)	1.79 m	39	80	(Turkey) Trabzonspor
8	RB	Dijana Števin	23 October 1986 (aged 29)	1.78 m	54	113	(France) Cercle Dijon Bourgogne
9	RB	Jelena Živković	6 July 1991 (aged 24)	1.84 m	63	99	(Romania) S.C.M. Craiova
11	CB	Ivana Prijović	4 February 1992 (aged 23)	1.76 m	4	0	(Serbia) ŽRK Radnički Kragujevac
15	RB	Anđela Janjušević	18 June 1995 (aged 20)	1.78 m	13	4	(Serbia) ŽRK Radnički Kragujevac
16	GK	Jovana Risović	3 October 1993 (aged 22)	1.70 m	55	2	(Serbia) ŽRK Radnički Kragujevac
17	P	Sanja Rajović	18 May 1981 (aged 34)	1.74 m	87	123	(Serbia) ŽRK Izvor
20	CB	Tamara Georgijev	6 September 1992 (aged 23)	1.72 m	13	9	(Turkey) Ardeşen GSK
21	LW	Dijana Radojević	2 April 1990 (aged 25)	1.70 m	17	24	(Serbia) ŽORK Jagodina
26	LB	Biljana Filipović	12 January 1986 (aged 29)	1.89 m	50	96	(Hungary) Fehérvár KC
27	GK	Nina Kolundžić	29 January 1990 (aged 25)	1.86 m	1	0	(Serbia) Sloga Petrovac
28	GK	Ana Kačarević	18 June 1984 (aged 31)	1.78 m	33	1	(Serbia) ŽRK Izvor
33	LB	Jovana Stoiljković	30 September 1988 (aged 27)	1.92 m	55	102	(France) HBC Nantes
71	CB	Kristina Liščević	20 October 1989 (aged 26)	1.63 m	57	60	(Hungary) Váci NKSE
83	P	Marija Petrović	18 March 1994 (aged 21)	1.85 m	5	4	(Serbia) ŽRK Izvor

=== Tunisia ===
A first 18-player squad, without players from the European leagues, was announced on 17 November 2015. The full 18-player squad was revealed on 22 November 2015. The final squad was announced on 4 December 2015.

Head coach: Mehrez Ben Ammar

No.	Pos.	Name	Date of birth (age)	Height	App.	Goals	Club
1	GK	Nesrine Hamza	23 October 1993 (aged 22)	1.74 m	30	0	(Tunisia) ASF Mahdia
4	LW	Elhem Gherissi	5 July 1991 (aged 24)	1.68 m	39	114	(Tunisia) ASF Mahdia
9	RB	Saida Rejeb	21 March 1994 (aged 21)	1.74 m	31	52	(Tunisia) Olympique de Gafsa
10	LB	Raja Toumi	3 April 1978 (aged 37)	1.79 m	230	982	(Tunisia) Club Africain
11	LW	Boutheïna Amiche	12 September 1990 (aged 25)	1.72 m	26	55	(Tunisia) Mégrine SHBF
12	GK	Echraf Abdallah	14 January 1987 (aged 28)	1.81 m	38	0	(Tunisia) Club Africain
13	RW	Fatma Sfar-Ben-Chker	20 March 1994 (aged 21)	1.70 m	76	198	(Tunisia) ASF Mahdia
14	P	Mouna Jlezi	22 June 1991 (aged 24)	1.73 m	3	2	(Tunisia) Club Africain
15	P	Rakia Rezgui	26 August 1996 (aged 19)	1.80 m	39	62	(Tunisia) ASE Ariana
17	LB	Chaïma Jouini	2 July 1996 (aged 19)	1.73 m	17	60	(Tunisia) Club Africain
20	CB	Mouna Chebbah	8 July 1982 (aged 33)	1.76 m	225	963	(France) Handball Cercle Nîmes
24	LB	Ines Khouildi	11 March 1985 (aged 30)	1.83 m	113	250	(Norway) Molde Elite
25	RB	Oumayma Dardour	6 January 1996 (aged 19)	1.78 m	26	63	(Tunisia) Club Africain
30	RW	Amal Hamrouni	16 June 1995 (aged 20)	1.56 m	54	229	(Tunisia) Club Africain
44	P	Manel Kouki	4 February 1988 (aged 27)	1.80 m	73	163	(Tunisia) Mégrine SHBF
85	GK	Noura Ben Slama	23 February 1985 (aged 30)	1.76 m	39	0	(France) Cercle Dijon Bourgogne

== Group B ==
=== Angola ===
An 18-player squad was announced on 5 November 2015.

Head coach: João Florêncio

No.	Pos.	Name	Date of birth (age)	Height	App.	Goals	Club
1	GK	Teresa Almeida	5 April 1988 (aged 27)	1.82 m	26	0	(Angola) Petro de Luanda
2	P	Liliana Venâncio	19 September 1995 (aged 20)	1.86 m	0	0	(Angola) 1º de Agosto
4	LW	Marta Santos	25 December 1988 (aged 26)	1.69 m	19	12	(Angola) Petro de Luanda
6	RW	Juliana Machado	6 November 1994 (aged 21)	1.70 m	19	43	(Angola) 1º de Agosto
7	LW	Elizabeth Cailo	2 July 1987 (aged 28)	1.75 m	7	20	(Angola) 1º de Agosto
8	CB	Lurdes Monteiro	11 July 1984 (aged 31)	1.70 m	16	46	(Angola) 1º de Agosto
9	CB	Natália Bernardo	25 December 1986 (aged 28)	1.70 m	67	149	(Angola) 1º de Agosto
11	LB	Luísa Kiala	25 January 1982 (aged 33)	1.72 m	98	180	(Angola) Petro de Luanda
12	GK	Cristina Branco	15 March 1985 (aged 30)	1.70 m	53	0	(Angola) 1º de Agosto
13	RW	Matilde André	11 February 1986 (aged 29)	1.72 m	32	61	(Angola) Progresso do Sambizanga
15	RB	Azenaide Carlos	14 June 1990 (aged 25)	1.75 m	44	130	(Angola) Petro de Luanda
17	RB	Wuta Dombaxe	5 April 1986 (aged 29)	1.73 m	16	50	(Angola) 1º de Agosto
21	LB	Magda Cazanga	28 May 1991 (aged 24)	1.84 m	15	22	(Angola) Petro de Luanda
31	LW	Janete dos Santos	10 June 1991 (aged 24)	1.75 m	4	4	(Angola) Progresso do Sambizanga
77	P	Elizabeth Viegas	20 January 1985 (aged 30)	1.80 m	4	15	(Angola) 1º de Agosto
90	LB	Isabel Guialo	8 April 1990 (aged 25)	1.72 m	27	42	(Angola) 1º de Agosto

=== China ===
Head coach: Yang Chao

No.	Pos.	Name	Date of birth (age)	Height	App.	Goals	Club
1	GK	Xu Mo	2 March 1990 (aged 25)	1.81 m	190	0	(China) Shanghai Handball
7	LB	Li Xiaoqing	22 December 1995 (aged 19)	1.80 m	50	130	(China) Army Handball
10	P	Tian Xiuxiu	13 January 1996 (aged 19)	1.74 m	45	80	(China) Shandong Handball
11	LW	Yu Yuanyuan	30 January 1995 (aged 20)	1.72 m	60	120	(China) Jiangsu Handball
15	RB	Sun Mengying	11 April 1990 (aged 25)	1.77 m	105	210	(China) Shanghai Handball
18	P	Sha Zhengwen	18 June 1990 (aged 25)	1.90 m	160	320	(China) Shanghai Handball
19	RW	Zhang Haixia	10 February 1995 (aged 20)	1.75 m	75	390	(China) Jiangsu Handball
20	LB	Yang Jiao	7 September 1994 (aged 21)	1.85 m	60	100	(China) Liaoning Handball
21	CB	Zhao Jiaqin	22 January 1986 (aged 29)	1.74 m	225	1000	(China) Jiangsu Handball
22	GK	Yang Yurou	16 July 1996 (aged 19)	1.85 m	15	0	(China) Anhui Handball
23	CB	Jin Mengqing	29 May 1995 (aged 20)	1.72 m	20	30	(China) Jiangsu Handball
24	CB	Li Yao	7 June 1992 (aged 23)	1.73 m	200	430	(China) Anhui Handball
25	RB	Yan Meizhu	28 January 1989 (aged 26)	1.88 m	140	270	(China) Beijing Handball
26	GK	Song Jialei	25 January 1995 (aged 20)	1.88 m	0	0	(China) Beijing Handball
27	LW	Wu Nana	4 March 1990 (aged 25)	1.75 m	185	360	(China) Shanghai Handball
28	P	Qiao Ru	5 January 1995 (aged 20)	1.83 m	70	145	(China) Jiangsu Handball

=== Cuba ===
Head coach: Jover Hernández

No.	Pos.	Name	Date of birth (age)	Height	App.	Goals	Club
1	GK	Niurkis Mora	6 October 1994 (aged 21)	1.76 m	31	0	Santiago de Cuba
2	RB	Milena Mesa	26 June 1993 (aged 22)	1.67 m	29	40	(Cuba) Holguín
3	RB	Ayling Martínez	4 September 1983 (aged 32)	1.72 m	97	260	(Cuba) La Habana
4	LW	Livia Varanes	14 September 1993 (aged 22)	1.72 m	26	27	Santiago de Cuba
5	CB	Sheila Salas	28 January 1993 (aged 22)	1.75 m	5	4	(Cuba) Matanzas
6	LB	Raiza Beltran	26 August 1994 (aged 21)	1.80 m	39	30	(Cuba) Guantánamo
9	LB	Lisandra Lusson	1 September 1985 (aged 30)	1.74 m	95	256	(Cuba) La Habana
10	RW	Gleinys Reyes	31 July 1989 (aged 26)	1.64 m	27	163	(Cuba) Granma
11	P	Yunisleidy Camejo	15 February 1990 (aged 25)	1.80 m	53	94	(Cuba) Pinar del Río
12	GK	Caridad Vizcay	21 February 1978 (aged 37)	1.80 m	112	0	Santiago de Cuba
13	RB	Liliamnis Rosabal	3 July 1999 (aged 16)	1.73 m	2	3	(Cuba) Granma
14	P	Ismary Barrio	19 August 1981 (aged 34)	1.79 m	29	22	(Cuba) Pinar del Río
16	GK	Eneleidis Guevara	4 August 1986 (aged 29)	1.79 m	61	0	(Cuba) Matanzas
18	LB	Yenma Ramírez	12 February 1984 (aged 31)	1.80 m	48	59	(Cuba) Guantánamo
23	CB	Eyatne Rizo	18 October 1995 (aged 20)	1.65 m	22	98	(Cuba) La Habana

=== Netherlands ===
A 20-player squad was announced on 23 October 2015. The final squad was announced on 29 November 2015.

Head coach: Henk Groener

No.	Pos.	Name	Date of birth (age)	Height	App.	Goals	Club
1	GK	Marieke van der Wal	7 November 1979 (aged 36)	1.83 m	180	0	(Netherlands) Virto/Quintus
5	LB	Jessy Kramer	16 February 1990 (aged 25)	1.77 m	77	78	(Norway) Vipers Kristiansand
6	RB	Laura van der Heijden	27 June 1990 (aged 25)	1.72 m	133	438	(Denmark) Team Esbjerg
7	RW	Debbie Bont	9 December 1990 (aged 24)	1.74 m	104	204	(Denmark) København Håndbold
8	LB	Lois Abbingh	13 August 1992 (aged 23)	1.77 m	77	336	(Romania) HCM Baia Mare
9	RB	Sanne van Olphen	13 March 1989 (aged 26)	1.77 m	49	86	(France) Toulon Handball
10	P	Danick Snelder	22 May 1990 (aged 25)	1.78 m	104	245	(Germany) Thüringer HC
11	CB	Lynn Knippenborg	7 January 1992 (aged 23)	1.75 m	44	67	(Norway) Vipers Kristiansand
13	P	Yvette Broch	23 December 1990 (aged 24)	1.85 m	70	146	(Hungary) Győri ETO
17	CB	Cornelia Groot	4 May 1988 (aged 27)	1.75 m	82	238	(Hungary) Győri ETO
18	LB	Kelly Dulfer	21 March 1994 (aged 21)	1.86 m	34	24	(Germany) VfL Oldenburg
21	LW	Michelle Goos	27 December 1989 (aged 25)	1.78 m	44	78	(Netherlands) VOC Amsterdam
24	LW	Martine Smeets	5 May 1990 (aged 25)	1.72 m	47	89	(Germany) SG BBM Bietigheim
26	RW	Angela Malestein	31 January 1993 (aged 22)	1.73 m	70	101	(Germany) SG BBM Bietigheim
29	LW	Sanne Hoekstra	5 May 1992 (aged 23)	1.65 m	3	3	(Germany) HSG Bensheim/Auerbach
33	GK	Tess Wester	19 May 1993 (aged 22)	1.78 m	28	0	(Germany) SG BBM Bietigheim
79	CB	Estavana Polman	5 August 1992 (aged 23)	1.74 m	74	226	(Denmark) Team Esbjerg

=== Poland ===
A 19-player squad was announced on 10 November 2015. The final squad was revealed on 30 November 2015.

Head coach: Kim Rasmussen

No.	Pos.	Name	Date of birth (age)	Height	App.	Goals	Club
3	RB	Monika Kobylińska	9 April 1995 (aged 20)	1.77 m	5	15	(Poland) Vistal Gdynia
4	P	Monika Stachowska	2 January 1981 (aged 34)	1.79 m	109	148	(Poland) Pogoń Szczecin
5	LB	Iwona Niedźwiedź	22 July 1979 (aged 36)	1.77 m	182	510	(Poland) MKS Lublin
7	LW	Joanna Gadzina	1 September 1992 (aged 23)	1.64 m	7	10	(Poland) Pogoń Szczecin
9	LW	Agnieszka Kocela	17 January 1988 (aged 27)	1.70 m	31	55	(Poland) MKS Lublin
12	GK	Weronika Gawlik	20 October 1986 (aged 29)	1.76 m	35	0	(Poland) MKS Lublin
14	LB	Karolina Kudłacz-Gloc	17 January 1985 (aged 30)	1.77 m	143	724	(Germany) HC Leipzig
17	LB	Klaudia Pielesz	25 October 1988 (aged 27)	1.90 m	77	165	(Germany) Frisch Auf Göppingen
18	RB	Aleksandra Zych	28 July 1992 (aged 23)	1.86 m	22	26	(Poland) Vistal Gdynia
19	RW	Aneta Łabuda	7 January 1995 (aged 20)	1.60 m	7	8	(Poland) Vistal Gdynia
25	RW	Karolina Zalewska	19 March 1984 (aged 31)	1.72 m	39	50	(France) Issy-Paris Hand
31	P	Hanna Sądej	1 July 1988 (aged 27)	1.84 m	17	12	(Poland) AZS Koszalin
37	CB	Kristina Repelewska	7 January 1981 (aged 34)	1.76 m	8	7	(Poland) MKS Lublin
40	GK	Anna Wysokińska	17 June 1987 (aged 28)	1.82 m	47	0	(Turkey) Yenimahalle Bld. SK
41	LB	Małgorzata Stasiak	5 November 1988 (aged 27)	1.79 m	44	76	(Poland) Pogoń Szczecin
77	P	Patrycja Kulwińska	31 March 1989 (aged 26)	1.78 m	96	154	(Poland) Vistal Gdynia
89	CB	Kinga Achruk	9 January 1989 (aged 26)	1.81 m	120	286	(Montenegro) ŽRK Budućnost Podgorica

=== Sweden ===
The squad was announced on 3 November 2015. On 24 November 2015, Edijana Dafe pulled out of the tournament due to pregnancy. On 3 December Marie Wall was officially announced as her replacement in the squad.

Head coach: Tomas Sivertsson

No.	Pos.	Name	Date of birth (age)	Height	App.	Goals	Club
1	GK	Johanna Bundsen	3 June 1991 (aged 24)	1.85 m	22	0	(Sweden) IK Sävehof
3	P	Frida Tegstedt	17 July 1987 (aged 28)	1.80 m	27	26	(Germany) Füchse Berlin
6	LB	Carin Strömberg	10 July 1993 (aged 22)	1.83 m	8	1	(Sweden) Skuru IK
7	P	Linn Blohm	20 May 1992 (aged 23)	1.80 m	39	78	(Denmark) Team Tvis Holstebro
8	LB	Jamina Roberts	28 May 1990 (aged 25)	1.75 m	93	143	(Denmark) Team Tvis Holstebro
9	LW	Louise Sand	27 December 1992 (aged 22)	1.64 m	46	72	(Sweden) IK Sävehof
12	GK	Filippa Idéhn	15 August 1990 (aged 25)	1.83 m	45	0	(Denmark) Team Esbjerg
13	RW	Emma Hawia Svensson	10 December 1990 (aged 24)	1.71 m	16	18	(Sweden) Skuru IK
15	LB	Johanna Ahlm	3 October 1987 (aged 28)	1.75 m	131	429	(Denmark) FC Midtjylland
17	CB	Linnea Torstenson	30 March 1983 (aged 32)	1.80 m	157	628	(Romania) CSM Bucharest
18	LW	Marie Wall	3 April 1992 (aged 23)	1.77 m	4	4	(Sweden) H 65 Höör
20	CB	Isabelle Gulldén	29 June 1989 (aged 26)	1.79 m	142	507	(Romania) CSM Bucharest
24	RW	Nathalie Hagman	19 July 1991 (aged 24)	1.67 m	76	150	(Denmark) Team Tvis Holstebro
27	CB	Sabina Jacobsen	24 March 1989 (aged 26)	1.80 m	72	109	(Denmark) FC Midtjylland
29	LB	Jenny Alm	10 April 1989 (aged 26)	1.84 m	61	157	(Denmark) Team Esbjerg
31	RB	Anna-Maria Johansson	15 February 1982 (aged 33)	1.84 m	87	178	(Sweden) Skövde HF

== Group C ==
=== Argentina ===
An 18-player squad was announced on 12 November 2015.

Head coach: Eduardo Peruchena

No.	Pos.	Name	Date of birth (age)	Height	App.	Goals	Club
1	GK	Marisol Carratu	15 July 1986 (aged 29)	1.79 m	86	0	(Argentina) Club Oeste
4	RW	Lucía Haro	21 August 1986 (aged 29)	1.79 m	91	193	(Argentina) Unión Eléctrica
5	LW	Manuela Pizzo	13 November 1992 (aged 23)	1.78 m	73	218	(Argentina) Estudiantes
6	LB	Luciana Salvadó	3 April 1990 (aged 25)	1.69 m	90	279	(Argentina) Club Oeste
7	P	Rocio Campigli	6 August 1994 (aged 21)	1.73 m	23	42	(Argentina) Estudiantes
8	LW	Amelia Belotti	17 November 1988 (aged 27)	1.79 m	76	241	(Argentina) Vilo
9	RW	Luciana Mendoza	14 March 1990 (aged 25)	1.70 m	89	263	(Argentina) Sedalo
10	CB	Victoria Crivelli	30 September 1990 (aged 25)	1.75 m	78	146	(Argentina) Ferro Carril Oeste
11	RB	Antonella Gambino	26 March 1990 (aged 25)	1.64 m	62	161	(Argentina) Argentinos Juniors
12	GK	Valentina Kogan	19 March 1980 (aged 35)	1.78 m	76	1	(Argentina) Vilo
14	LB	Valeria Bianchi	16 September 1985 (aged 30)	1.70 m	154	321	(Argentina) NS Luján
15	P	Antonela Mena	28 March 1988 (aged 27)	1.82 m	117	371	(Argentina) NS Luján
16	GK	Silvina Schlesinger	28 March 1985 (aged 30)	1.77 m	134	1	(Argentina) Quilmes
18	CB	Macarena Sans	20 November 1992 (aged 23)	1.64 m	31	61	(Argentina) Mendoza de Regatas
19	LW	Florencia Ponce de Leon	26 February 1992 (aged 23)	1.80 m	29	60	(Argentina) Club Oeste
20	RB	Xoana Iacoi	3 June 1992 (aged 23)	1.62 m	11	25	(Argentina) Cideco Handball
21	RW	Macarena Gandulfo	3 November 1993 (aged 22)	1.76 m	59	148	(Spain) BM Alcobendas
22	CB	Elke Karsten	15 May 1995 (aged 20)	1.77 m	25	100	(Argentina) Quilmes

=== Brazil ===
The squad was announced on 13 November 2015.

Head coach: Morten Soubak

No.	Pos.	Name	Date of birth (age)	Height	App.	Goals	Club
2	P	Fabiana Diniz	13 May 1981 (aged 34)	1.83 m	194	338	(Germany) SG BBM Bietigheim
3	RW	Alexandra do Nascimento	16 September 1981 (aged 34)	1.77 m	167	665	(Romania) HCM Baia Mare
5	P	Daniela Piedade	2 March 1979 (aged 36)	1.73 m	174	316	(Hungary) Siófok KC
6	LB	Amanda de Andrade	20 December 1989 (aged 25)	1.74 m	51	89	(Brazil) UnC/Concórdia
7	P	Tamires Morena Lima	16 May 1994 (aged 21)	1.80 m	26	19	(Hungary) Mosonmagyaróvári
8	LW	Fernanda da Silva	25 September 1989 (aged 26)	1.76 m	84	261	(Romania) CSM Bucharest
9	CB	Ana Paula Rodrigues	18 October 1987 (aged 28)	1.72 m	130	456	(Romania) CSM Bucharest
10	RW	Jéssica Quintino	17 April 1991 (aged 24)	1.76 m	77	171	(Poland) MKS Selgros Lublin
12	GK	Bárbara Arenhart	4 October 1986 (aged 29)	1.82 m	92	2	(Denmark) Nykøbing Falster
15	CB	Francielle da Rocha	10 June 1992 (aged 23)	1.64 m	46	60	(Brazil) Vegus/Guarulhos
16	GK	Mayssa Pessoa	11 September 1984 (aged 31)	1.80 m	67	0	(Romania) CSM Bucharest
18	LB	Eduarda Amorim	23 September 1986 (aged 29)	1.86 m	133	440	(Hungary) Győri ETO
20	LW	Larissa Araújo	1 July 1992 (aged 23)	1.81 m	9	23	(Brazil) UnC/Concórdia
21	RB	Bruna de Paula	26 September 1996 (aged 19)	1.70 m	0	0	(Brazil) São José
60	RW	Célia Coppi	17 April 1980 (aged 35)	1.76 m	84	261	(Brazil) Metodista/São Bernardo
81	RB	Deonise Cavaleiro	20 June 1983 (aged 32)	1.80 m	140	317	Free agent

=== DR Congo ===
Head coach: Celestin Mpoua

No.	Pos.	Name	Date of birth (age)	Height	App.	Goals	Club
1	GK	Louise Makubanza	20 October 1992 (aged 23)	1.80 m			(Angola) 1º de Agosto
2	RB	Jumelle Okoko	26 December 1984 (aged 30)	1.68 m			(France) Blavozy RB
3	CB	Grace Shokkos	4 August 1992 (aged 23)	1.73 m			(France) Poitiers Handball
4	CB	Consolate Feza	23 March 1985 (aged 30)	1.68 m			(Democratic Republic of the Congo) Mikishi Lubumbashi
5	RW	Olga Milemba	27 July 1984 (aged 31)	1.69 m			(Democratic Republic of the Congo) Héritage Kinshasa
6	LW	Clémence Matutu	26 April 1992 (aged 23)	1.59 m			(France) Poitiers Handball
7	P	Apopie Lusamba	20 May 1985 (aged 30)	1.68 m			(France) Gagny
8	CB	Constance Louoba	14 June 1971 (aged 44)	1.68 m			(France) Blavozy RB
9	LB	Christianne Mwasesa	12 March 1985 (aged 30)	1.75 m			(Angola) 1º de Agosto
10	P	Virginie Mamba	5 December 1980 (aged 35)	1.80 m			(Democratic Republic of the Congo) Héritage Kinshasa
11	LB	Aurelie Luhaka	19 April 1992 (aged 23)	1.90 m			(France) HB Octeville
13	LB	Lydia Musonda Kasangala	6 May 1988 (aged 27)	1.88 m			(Democratic Republic of the Congo) Héritage Kinshasa
15	P	Astride Palata	14 November 1982 (aged 33)	1.80 m			(Angola) 1º de Agosto
16	GK	Bibiche Kabamba	31 July 1981 (aged 34)	1.84 m			(Democratic Republic of the Congo) Héritage Kinshasa
17	LW	Patricia Mayoulou	31 July 1981 (aged 34)	1.66 m			Free agent
22	GK	Diane Louoba	16 April 1983 (aged 32)	1.63 m			(France) Blavozy RB
25	LB	Carine Babina	16 January 1994 (aged 21)	1.78 m			(Democratic Republic of the Congo) Mikishi Lubumbashi
91	RW	Simone Thiero	15 March 1993 (aged 22)	1.76 m			(France) Toulon Handball

=== France ===
An 18-player squad was announced on 13 November 2015, which was renewed on 3 December 2015.

Head coach: Alain Portes

No.	Pos.	Name	Date of birth (age)	Height	App.	Goals	Club
1	GK	Laura Glauser	20 August 1993 (aged 22)	1.78 m	22	0	(France) Metz Handball
2	LW	Coralie Lassource	1 September 1992 (aged 23)	1.68 m	4	5	(France) Issy-Paris Hand
4	P	Nina Kamto Njitam	25 June 1983 (aged 32)	1.78 m	214	401	(France) Metz Handball
5	RB	Camille Ayglon	21 May 1985 (aged 30)	1.80 m	182	355	(France) Handball Cercle Nîmes
7	CB	Allison Pineau	2 May 1989 (aged 26)	1.81 m	166	406	(Romania) HCM Baia Mare
8	P	Laurisa Landre	27 October 1985 (aged 30)	1.74 m	23	36	(Romania) S.C.M. Craiova
10	CB	Grace Zaadi	7 July 1993 (aged 22)	1.71 m	36	48	(France) Metz Handball
11	RW	Marie Prouvensier	9 February 1994 (aged 21)	1.65 m	17	20	(France) Cercle Dijon Bourgogne
12	GK	Amandine Leynaud	2 May 1988 (aged 27)	1.78 m	162	1	(North Macedonia) ŽRK Vardar
13	LW	Manon Houette	2 July 1992 (aged 23)	1.68 m	12	28	(France) Fleury Loiret HB
17	LW	Siraba Dembélé	28 June 1986 (aged 29)	1.72 m	195	632	(North Macedonia) ŽRK Vardar
18	RW	Chloé Bulleux	18 November 1991 (aged 24)	1.72 m	10	20	(France) Handball Cercle Nîmes
21	LB	Alice Lévêque	9 May 1989 (aged 26)	1.72 m	36	21	(France) Metz Handball
24	P	Béatrice Edwige	3 October 1988 (aged 27)	1.82 m	12	9	(France) OGC Nice
27	CB	Estelle Nze Minko	11 August 1991 (aged 24)	1.76 m	22	23	(France) Fleury Loiret HB
29	LB	Gnonsiane Niombla	9 July 1990 (aged 25)	1.72 m	41	94	(France) Fleury Loiret HB
64	RB	Alexandra Lacrabère	27 April 1987 (aged 28)	1.72 m	161	472	(France) OGC Nice

=== Germany ===
A 19-player roster was announced on 11 November 2015. The squad was reduced to 18 on 25 November 2015.

Head coach: Jakob Vestergaard

No.	Pos.	Name	Date of birth (age)	Height	App.	Goals	Club
5	LB	Saskia Lang	19 December 1986 (aged 28)	1.78 m	58	50	(Germany) HC Leipzig
7	P	Meike Schmelzer	19 July 1993 (aged 22)	1.78 m	4	2	(Germany) Thüringer HC
10	CB	Anna Loerper	18 November 1984 (aged 31)	1.64 m	206	345	(Germany) TuS Metzingen
11	LB	Xenia Smits	22 April 1994 (aged 21)	1.82 m	14	24	(France) Metz Handball
12	GK	Katja Kramarczyk	18 March 1984 (aged 31)	1.78 m	112	0	(Germany) HC Leipzig
13	P	Julia Behnke	28 March 1993 (aged 22)	1.80 m	10	8	(Germany) TuS Metzingen
15	CB	Kim Naidzinavicius	6 April 1991 (aged 24)	1.81 m	56	104	(Germany) Bayer Leverkusen
16	GK	Clara Woltering	2 March 1983 (aged 32)	1.78 m	190	0	(Germany) Borussia Dortmund
17	RB	Anne Hubinger	31 July 1993 (aged 22)	1.85 m	37	43	(Germany) HC Leipzig
22	RB	Susann Müller	26 May 1988 (aged 27)	1.86 m	86	290	(Germany) SG BBM Bietigheim
24	LW	Lone Fischer	8 September 1988 (aged 27)	1.65 m	12	18	(Germany) Buxtehuder SV
25	RW	Alexandra Mazzucco	29 January 1993 (aged 22)	1.75 m	5	13	(Germany) HC Leipzig
28	LW	Franziska Müller	12 March 1990 (aged 25)	1.75 m	4	9	(Germany) HSG Blomberg-Lippe
30	RW	Jennifer Rode	3 August 1995 (aged 20)	1.76 m	2	0	(Germany) Bayer Leverkusen
32	LB	Ewgenija Minevskaja	31 October 1992 (aged 23)	1.82 m	43	80	(Germany) HC Leipzig
33	P	Luisa Schulze	14 September 1990 (aged 25)	1.92 m	51	56	(Germany) HC Leipzig

=== South Korea ===
Head coach: Lim Young-chul

No.	Pos.	Name	Date of birth (age)	Height	App.	Goals	Club
5	RB	Jung Yu-ra	6 February 1992 (aged 23)	1.71 m			(South Korea) Colorful Daegu
11	RB	Ryu Eun-hee	24 February 1990 (aged 25)	1.80 m			(South Korea) Incheon Sports Council
12	GK	Park Mi-ra	20 April 1987 (aged 28)	1.72 m			(South Korea) Wonderful Samcheok
13	P	Yoo Hyun-ji	16 July 1984 (aged 31)	1.75 m			(South Korea) Wonderful Samcheok
14	LB	Kim Jin-yi	20 June 1993 (aged 22)	1.81 m			(South Korea) Colorful Daegu
15	LW	Choi Su-min	9 January 1990 (aged 25)	1.77 m			(South Korea) Seoul City
16	GK	Ju Hui	4 November 1989 (aged 26)	1.80 m			(South Korea) Seoul City
17	LB	Sim Hae-in	31 October 1987 (aged 28)	1.78 m			(South Korea) Wonderful Samcheok
18	LB	Han Mi-seul	13 August 1993 (aged 22)	1.78 m			(South Korea) Wonderful Samcheok
19	CB	Jung Ji-hae	6 March 1985 (aged 30)	1.68 m			(South Korea) Wonderful Samcheok
20	RW	Kim Jin-sil	1 October 1994 (aged 21)	1.67 m			(South Korea) Busan Infrastructure
21	LW	Lee Eun-bi	23 October 1990 (aged 25)	1.63 m			(South Korea) Busan Infrastructure
24	CB	Gwon Han-na	22 November 1989 (aged 26)	1.71 m			(South Korea) Seoul City
27	P	Nam Yeong-sin	27 August 1990 (aged 25)	1.75 m			(South Korea) Gyeongnam
28	LB	Jo Su-yeon	6 July 1994 (aged 21)	1.74 m			(South Korea) KNSU
29	RW	Yu So-jeong	4 June 1996 (aged 19)	1.68 m			(South Korea) SK Sugar Gliders

== Group D ==
=== Kazakhstan ===
Head coach: Yoon Tae-il

No.	Pos.	Name	Date of birth (age)	Height	App.	Goals	Club
1	GK	Yevgeniya Tsupenkova	24 July 1985 (aged 30)	1.85 m	18	0	(Kazakhstan) Seikhun-KAM Handball
3	RB	Olga Tankina	20 January 1994 (aged 21)	1.82 m	10	110	(Kazakhstan) Almaty Handball
5	RW	Marina Pikalova	16 March 1985 (aged 30)	1.60 m	20	50	(Kazakhstan) Almaty Handball
6	LW	Valeriya Karavayeva	3 August 1993 (aged 22)	1.65 m	4	12	(Kazakhstan) Almaty Handball
7	RW	Elvira Akhmet	2 May 1994 (aged 21)	1.68 m	18	36	(Kazakhstan) Almaty Region Handball
8	P	Yelshat Ukbenova	28 February 1994 (aged 21)	1.68 m	8	45	(Kazakhstan) Almaty Region Handball
9	LB	Veronika Khardina	29 August 1996 (aged 19)	1.75 m	8	48	(Kazakhstan) Almaty Handball
10	P	Anastassiya Rodina	30 June 1991 (aged 24)	1.78 m	10	47	(Kazakhstan) Almaty Region Handball
11	LW	Viktoriya Kolotinskaya	10 March 1995 (aged 20)	1.75 m	10	61	(Kazakhstan) Seikhun-KAM Handball
14	P	Arailym Abdikhamit	3 March 1999 (aged 16)	1.92 m	4	42	(Kazakhstan) Almaty Handball
15	LB	Irina Alexandrova	2 October 1994 (aged 21)	1.83 m	14	108	(Kazakhstan) Almaty Region Handball
16	GK	Irina Danilova	17 December 1993 (aged 21)	1.85 m	8	0	(Kazakhstan) Almaty Handball
19	RB	Kristina Kapralova	4 January 1995 (aged 20)	1.76 m	8	64	(Kazakhstan) Kazygurt Handball
96	CB	Dana Abilda	18 October 1996 (aged 19)	1.68 m	10	110	(Kazakhstan) Seikhun-KAM Handball

=== Norway ===
The squad was announced on 8 November 2015. On 16 December Ida Alstad replaced Vilde Ingstad, due to a minor injury on Mari Molids knee.

Head coach: Thorir Hergeirsson

No.	Pos.	Name	Date of birth (age)	Height	App.	Goals	Club
1	GK	Kari Aalvik Grimsbø	4 January 1985 (aged 30)	1.80 m	122	0	(Hungary) Győri ETO
2	LB	Mari Molid	8 August 1990 (aged 25)	1.78 m	75	47	(Norway) Larvik HK
4	LB	Veronica Kristiansen	10 July 1990 (aged 25)	1.75 m	51	130	(Denmark) FC Midtjylland
5	LB	Ida Alstad	13 June 1985 (aged 30)	1.72 m	124	294	(Norway) Byåsen HE
6	P	Heidi Løke	12 December 1982 (aged 32)	1.73 m	150	544	(Hungary) Győri ETO
7	RW	Stine Skogrand	3 March 1993 (aged 22)	1.73 m	23	38	(Norway) Tertnes HE
8	P	Vilde Ingstad	18 December 1994 (aged 20)	1.78 m	12	11	(Norway) Oppsal
9	RB	Nora Mørk	5 April 1991 (aged 24)	1.69 m	58	237	(Norway) Larvik HK
10	CB	Stine Bredal Oftedal	25 September 1991 (aged 24)	1.68 m	101	183	(France) Issy-Paris Hand
12	GK	Silje Solberg	16 June 1990 (aged 25)	1.78 m	73	0	(Denmark) Team Tvis Holstebro
15	RB	Linn Jørum Sulland	15 July 1984 (aged 31)	1.78 m	167	507	(Hungary) Győri ETO
17	P	Pernille Wibe	17 April 1988 (aged 27)	1.81 m	43	28	(France) Issy-Paris Hand
21	LB	Betina Riegelhuth	17 June 1987 (aged 28)	1.78 m	40	45	(Denmark) Team Esbjerg
22	RW	Amanda Kurtović	25 July 1991 (aged 24)	1.75 m	54	133	(Norway) Larvik HK
23	LW	Camilla Herrem	8 October 1986 (aged 29)	1.67 m	165	410	(Denmark) Team Tvis Holstebro
24	LW	Sanna Solberg	16 June 1990 (aged 25)	1.78 m	59	111	(Norway) Larvik HK
26	CB	Marta Tomac	20 September 1990 (aged 25)	1.79 m	3	2	(Norway) Vipers Kristiansand

=== Puerto Rico ===
Head coach: Camilo Estévez

No.	Pos.	Name	Date of birth (age)	Height	App.	Goals	Club
1	GK	Kitsa Escobar	1 December 1990 (aged 25)	1.64 m	38	0	(Puerto Rico) Rio Grande Handball
2	RB	Adriana Cabrera	23 November 1992 (aged 23)	1.70 m	38	71	(Puerto Rico) Santa Isabel Handball
5	CB	Nathalys Ceballos	3 October 1990 (aged 25)	1.51 m	38	151	(Puerto Rico) Rio Grande Handball
6	LB	Sheila Hiraldo	21 April 1989 (aged 26)	1.63 m	38	117	(Puerto Rico) Guadalupe Handball
7	RB	Jereny Espinal	10 March 1997 (aged 18)	1.81 m	5	1	(Puerto Rico) Santa Isabel Handball
8	RW	Joane Vergara	20 August 1990 (aged 25)	1.63 m	15	27	(Puerto Rico) Rio Grande Handball
9	P	Natalie Cabello	11 March 1990 (aged 25)	1.63 m	12	16	(Puerto Rico) Guaynabo Handball
11	LW	Fabiola Martínez	30 May 1995 (aged 20)	1.73 m	12	11	(Puerto Rico) Santa Isabel Handball
14	LB	Nicolette Pope	30 September 1997 (aged 18)	1.73 m	12	18	(Puerto Rico) Rio Grande Handball
15	RW	Jailene Maldonado	15 February 1995 (aged 20)	1.79 m	20	38	(Puerto Rico) Santa Isabel Handball
16	GK	Zugeily Soto	10 September 1996 (aged 19)	1.76 m	15	0	(Puerto Rico) Santa Isabel Handball
18	P	Ciris García	9 January 1991 (aged 24)	1.73 m	38	170	(Puerto Rico) Guadalupe Handball
19	P	Deyaneira García	3 May 1996 (aged 19)	1.64 m	0	0	(Puerto Rico) Santa Isabel Handball
22	LB	Zuleika Fuentes	29 June 1993 (aged 22)	1.58 m	12	20	(Puerto Rico) Rio Grande Handball
23	LB	Paola Morel	29 October 1996 (aged 19)	1.76 m	0	0	(Puerto Rico) Rio Grande Handball

=== Romania ===
A 17-player squad was announced on 13 November 2015.

Head coach: Tomas Ryde

No.	Pos.	Name	Date of birth (age)	Height	App.	Goals	Club
3	LB	Gabriella Szűcs	31 August 1984 (aged 31)	1.79 m	2	0	(Romania) HCM Baia Mare
6	P	Crina Pintea	3 April 1990 (aged 25)	1.86 m	20	32	(Germany) Thüringer HC
7	RW	Adriana Nechita	14 November 1983 (aged 32)	1.65 m	130	318	(Romania) HCM Baia Mare
8	LB	Cristina Neagu	26 August 1988 (aged 27)	1.80 m	128	521	(Montenegro) ŽRK Budućnost Podgorica
9	CB	Aurelia Brădeanu	5 May 1979 (aged 36)	1.79 m	253	637	(Romania) CSM Bucharest
11	LB	Gabriela Perianu	20 June 1994 (aged 21)	1.87 m	23	45	(Romania) HCM Baia Mare
12	GK	Ionica Munteanu	7 January 1979 (aged 36)	1.75 m	17	0	(Romania) HCM Baia Mare
13	CB	Luciana Marin	13 October 1988 (aged 27)	1.76 m	10	15	(Romania) HCM Baia Mare
15	LW	Valentina Ardean-Elisei	5 June 1982 (aged 33)	1.75 m	205	807	(Romania) HCM Baia Mare
22	P	Oana Manea	18 April 1985 (aged 30)	1.75 m	274	355	(Romania) CSM Bucharest
30	GK	Paula Ungureanu	30 March 1980 (aged 35)	1.80 m	140	2	(Romania) HCM Baia Mare
36	LW	Ana Maria Tănăsie	6 April 1995 (aged 20)	1.72 m	0	0	(Romania) HCM Baia Mare
55	RB	Melinda Geiger	28 March 1987 (aged 28)	1.77 m	70	165	(Romania) HCM Baia Mare
77	LB	Eliza Buceschi	31 August 1993 (aged 22)	1.75 m	26	54	(Germany) Thüringer HC
88	RB	Patricia Vizitiu	15 October 1988 (aged 27)	1.74 m	30	45	(Romania) HCM Baia Mare
89	RW	Laura Chiper	21 August 1989 (aged 26)	1.73 m	15	15	(Romania) Corona Brașov

=== Russia ===
A 20-player squad was announced on 12 November 2015. The squad was reduced to 18 on 25 November 2015.

Head coach: Yevgeni Trefilov

No.	Pos.	Name	Date of birth (age)	Height	App.	Goals	Club
1	GK	Anna Sedoykina	1 August 1984 (aged 31)	1.81 m	89	2	(Russia) Rostov-Don
2	LW	Polina Kuznetcova	10 June 1987 (aged 28)	1.70 m	92	251	(Russia) HC Astrakhanochka
4	LB	Victoria Zhilinskayte	6 March 1989 (aged 26)	1.88 m	91	139	(Russia) HC Astrakhanochka
7	CB	Daria Dmitrieva	9 August 1995 (aged 20)	1.78 m	3	10	(Russia) Lada Togliatti
8	LB	Anna Sen	3 February 1990 (aged 25)	1.85 m	51	119	(Russia) Rostov-Don
10	LB	Olga Levina	4 March 1985 (aged 30)	1.79 m	92	184	(Russia) Lada Togliatti
13	RW	Anna Vyakhireva	13 March 1995 (aged 20)	1.62 m	3	7	(Russia) HC Astrakhanochka
17	LB	Vladlena Bobrovnikova	24 October 1987 (aged 28)	1.80 m	0	0	(Russia) Rostov-Don
19	P	Ksenia Makeeva	19 September 1990 (aged 25)	1.85 m	48	88	(Russia) Rostov-Don
22	LW	Yekaterina Marennikova	29 April 1982 (aged 33)	1.79 m	90	218	(Russia) Zvezda Zvenigorod
24	RB	Irina Bliznova	6 October 1986 (aged 29)	1.82 m	109	298	(Russia) Lada Togliatti
25	RW	Olga Chernoivanenko	17 April 1989 (aged 26)	1.75 m	76	161	(North Macedonia) ŽRK Vardar
33	CB	Ekaterina Ilina	7 March 1991 (aged 24)	1.75 m	27	40	(Russia) Rostov-Don
81	RW	Ekaterina Atkova	20 April 1985 (aged 30)	1.70 m	0	0	(Russia) KSK Luch Moscow
84	GK	Tatiana Erokhina	7 September 1984 (aged 31)	1.85 m	0	0	(Russia) Lada Togliatti
99	RB	Tatiana Khmyrova	6 February 1990 (aged 25)	1.78 m	58	182	(North Macedonia) ŽRK Vardar

=== Spain ===
An 18-player squad was announced on 12 November 2015. The final squad was announced on 1 December 2015.

Head coach: Jorge Dueñas

No.	Pos.	Name	Date of birth (age)	Height	App.	Goals	Club
2	RW	Marta López	4 February 1990 (aged 25)	1.68 m	67	140	(France) Fleury Loiret HB
4	RW	Carmen Martín	29 May 1988 (aged 27)	1.72 m	158	528	(Romania) CSM Bucuresti
5	P	Maria Núñez	27 November 1988 (aged 27)	1.70 m	31	15	(France) ESBF Handball de Besançon
6	LB	Nely Carla Alberto	2 July 1983 (aged 32)	1.79 m	105	296	(France) UB Mios Biganos
9	RB	Marta Mangué	23 April 1983 (aged 32)	1.70 m	271	978	(France) Fleury Loiret HB
10	CB	Macarena Aguilar	12 March 1985 (aged 30)	1.70 m	202	557	(Hungary) Győri Audi ETO KC
12	GK	Silvia Navarro	20 March 1979 (aged 36)	1.69 m	128	2	(Spain) BM Remudas
14	P	Elisabeth Chávez	17 November 1990 (aged 25)	1.92 m	138	77	(France) Fleury Loiret HB
17	LW	Elisabeth Pinedo	13 May 1981 (aged 34)	1.75 m	178	393	(Spain) BM Bera Bera
25	LB	Nerea Pena	13 December 1989 (aged 25)	1.75 m	85	246	(Hungary) Ferencvárosi TC
27	LB	Lara González Ortega	22 February 1992 (aged 23)	1.84 m	38	50	(France) Metz Handball
30	P	Patricia Elorza	8 April 1984 (aged 31)	1.80 m	106	67	(France) ESBF Handball de Besançon
35	LW	Naiara Egozkue	21 October 1983 (aged 32)	1.73 m	46	63	(Spain) Mecalia Guardes
44	P	Ainhoa Hernández	27 April 1994 (aged 21)	1.80 m	13	10	(Spain) BM Zuazo
48	GK	Darly de Paula	25 August 1982 (aged 33)	1.78 m	7	0	(France) Fleury Loiret HB
86	LB	Alexandrina Barbosa	5 May 1986 (aged 29)	1.75 m	52	256	(France) Fleury Loiret HB
