= Handball at the 2015 Pan American Games – Women's team rosters =

This article shows the rosters of all participating teams at the women's handball tournament at the 2015 Pan American Games in Toronto. Rosters can have a maximum of 15 athletes.

== Argentina ==
The Argentine women's handball team that will compete at the 2015 Pan American Games:

Head coach: Eduardo Peruchena

No.	Pos.	Name	Date of birth (age)	Height	App.	Goals	Club
1	GK	Marisol Carratu	15 July 1986 (aged 29)	1.74 m	81	1	(Argentina) Ferro Oeste
4	RB	Lucía Haro	21 August 1986 (aged 28)	1.78 m	43	65	(Argentina) Unión Eléctrica
5	LW	Manuela Pizzo	13 November 1991 (aged 23)	1.77 m	19	22	(Brazil) AD Blumenau
6	LW	Luciana Salvado	13 April 1990 (aged 25)	1.69 m	63		(Argentina) Ferro Oeste
7	LB	Rocio Campigli	6 August 1994 (aged 20)	1.73 m	13		(Argentina) Estudiantes
8	LB	Amelia Belotti	17 November 1988 (aged 26)	1.80 m	44	65	(Argentina) Italia Handball
9	RB	Luciana Mendoza	14 March 1990 (aged 25)	1.70 m	51	78	(Brazil) AD Blumenau
10	CB	Victoria Crivelli	30 September 1990 (aged 24)	1.76 m	31	40	(Argentina) Ferro Oeste
11	RW	Antonella Gambino	26 March 1990 (aged 25)	1.64 m	16	25	(Argentina) Argentinos Juniors
12	GK	Valentina Kogan	19 March 1980 (aged 35)	1.73 m	100		(Argentina) Vilo
14	LB	Valeria Bianchi	16 September 1985 (aged 29)	1.70 m	53	50	(Argentina) NS Lujan
15	P	Antonela Mena	28 March 1988 (aged 27)	1.82 m	61	60	(Argentina) CID Moreno
18	LB	Macarena Sans	20 November 1996 (aged 18)		16		(Argentina) Mendoza
21	LB	Macarena Gandulfo	3 November 1993 (aged 21)	1.74 m	22		(Argentina) Sedalo
22	CB	Elke Karsten	15 May 1995 (aged 20)	1.75 m	5	14	(Argentina) AACF Quilmes

== Brazil ==
Brazil announced their squad on June 16, 2015. Fabiana Diniz was ruled out because of a deep vein thrombosis and was replaced by Elaine Gomes.

Head coach: (Denmark) Morten Soubak

No.	Pos.	Name	Date of birth (age)	Height	App.	Goals	Club
3	RW	Alexandra do Nascimento	16 September 1981 (aged 33)	1.77 m	133	502	(Romania) HCM Baia Mare
4	LW	Samira Rocha	26 January 1989 (aged 26)	1.70 m	53	139	(France) OGC Nice
5	P	Daniela Piedade	2 March 1979 (aged 36)	1.73 m	138	265	(Hungary) Siófok KC
6	LB	Amanda de Andrade	20 October 1989 (aged 25)	1.74 m	15	30	(Brazil) Handebol Concórdia
7	P	Tamires Morena Lima	16 May 1994 (aged 21)	1.89 m			(Hungary) Győri Audi ETO KC
8	LW	Fernanda da Silva	25 September 1989 (aged 25)	1.76 m	70	281	(Romania) CSM Bucharest
9	CB	Ana Paula Rodrigues	18 October 1987 (aged 27)	1.72 m	95	427	(Romania) CSM Bucharest
10	RW	Jéssica Quintino	17 April 1991 (aged 24)	1.76 m			(Poland) MKS Lublin
12	GK	Bárbara Arenhart	4 October 1986 (aged 28)	1.82 m	59	1	(Romania) NFH
15	CB	Francielle da Rocha	10 June 1992 (aged 23)	1.66 m			(Austria) Hypo Niederösterreich
16	GK	Mayssa Pessoa	11 June 1984 (aged 31)	1.80 m	38	0	(Romania) CSM Bucharest
19		Elaine Gomes Barbosa	1 June 1992 (aged 23)	1.86 m	1		(Brazil) Guarulhos
33	LB	Jaqueline Anastácio	9 November 1987 (aged 27)	1.75 m			(Germany) SG BBM Bietigheim
60	RW	Célia Coppi	17 April 1980 (aged 35)	1.76 m			(Brazil) Metodista
81	RB	Deonise Cavaleiro	20 June 1983 (aged 32)	1.80 m	105	241	(Romania) CSM Bucharest

== Canada ==
Canada announced their squad on May 4, 2015.

No.	Pos.	Name	Date of birth (age)	Height	App.	Goals	Club
1	GK	Kimberley Ewanovich	29 April 1986 (age 40)	1.80 m	34		(Norway) Sola HK
2	RW	Nassima Benhacine	12 December 1989 (age 36)	1.57 m	13		(Canada) Celtique MTL HB
3	CB	Emily Routhier	29 March 1994 (age 32)	1.74 m	29		(Canada) Sherbrooke HB
4	RW	Abbey Perry	22 March 1997 (age 29)	1.62 m	11		(Canada) Alberta HB
5	LW	Janel Roggiani	29 September 1995 (age 30)	1.75 m	15		(Canada) Alberta HB
6	RB	Valerie Lochet	21 January 1991 (age 35)	1.60 m	8		(France) Aunis HB
7	RB	Taylor Sterling	15 June 1994 (age 32)	1.69 m	17		(Canada) Alberta HB
8	LW	Myriam Laplante	21 February 1991 (age 35)	1.70 m	8		(Canada) Champlain Laprairie
9	LB	Christina Arès-St-Onge	27 April 1992 (age 34)	1.70 m	6		(Canada) Granby HB
10	CB	Brenna Sanderson	28 June 1995 (age 31)	1.69 m	17		(Canada) Alberta HB
11	RB	Catherine Poirier	9 October 1989 (age 36)	1.77 m	24		(Canada) Drummondville HB
12	GK	Vassilia Gagnon	5 September 1990 (age 35)	1.70 m	10		(Canada) Celtique MLT HB
13	LB	Kim Barette	16 May 1987 (age 39)	1.80 m	26		(Canada) Champlain Laprairie
15	P	Audrey Marcoux	8 June 1994 (age 32)	1.76 m	29		(Canada) Sherbrooke HB
17	LB	Amanda Desnoyers	2 March 1992 (age 34)	1.77 m	8		(Canada) Champlain Laprairie

== Chile ==
Head coach: Juan Moreno

No.	Pos.	Name	Date of birth (age)	Height	App.	Goals	Club
3		Belén Canessa	22 September 1990 (age 35)		1
4	RB	Daniela Miño	10 October 1996 (age 29)	1.72 m	22		(France) Fieury
7	LB	Nicole Llanos	12 September 1991 (age 34)	1.60 m	20		(Chile) BM Irene-USAB EC
8	LB	Francisca Zavala	9 November 1996 (age 29)	1.74 m	8		(Chile) BM La Reina
10	CB	Inga Feuchtmann	10 February 1985 (age 41)	1.70 m	61		(Germany) TSG OBER Echbach
11	LW	Valeria Flores	24 October 1984 (age 41)	1.59 m	71		(Spain) BM Bolaños
12	GK	Andrea Cisterna	23 March 1986 (age 40)	1.69 m	56		(Chile) BM Ovalle
13	RB	Maria Musalem	6 September 1983 (age 42)	1.69 m	73		Hypo Austria
16	P	Alicia Torres	1 June 1993 (age 33)	1.72 m	22		(Spain) Aula Cultural
17	P	Daniela Caessa	21 January 1986 (age 40)	1.69 m	66		(Italy) Nuova Teramo
18	RW	Constanza Deuster	2 August 1994 (age 31)	1.64 m	5		U de Chile
19	GK	Antonella Piantini	14 April 1992 (age 34)	1.78 m	8		(Chile) Real Santiago
22	CB	Maura Alvarez	13 November 1996 (age 29)	1.73 m	8		(Chile) Saint Rose
28	LW	Belén Castañeda	15 July 1996 (age 29)	1.60 m	8		(Chile) Saint Rose
31	LB	María Correa	20 October 1997 (age 28)	1.71 m	8		(Chile) BM Ovalle

== Cuba ==
Head coach: Maturell

- Niurkis Mora
- Milena Mesa
- Ayling Martínez
- Livia Varanes
- Raiza Beltran
- Niuris Ferrer
- Lizandra Lusson
- Gleinys Reyes
- Yunisleidy Camejo
- Ismary Barrio
- Eneleidis Guevara
- Lisandra Espinosa
- Yenma Ramírez
- Marines Rojas
- Eyatne Rizo

== Mexico ==
coach: Monica Piña

- Itzel Aguirre
- Tania Navarro
- Guadalupe Saavedra
- Fernanda Rivera
- Violeta Yedra
- Denisse Romo
- Laura Morales
- Marlene Sosa
- Nashely Jaramillo
- Lucero Quezada
- Maria Rocha
- Manuela Zavala
- Anali Favela
- Belen Aguirre
- Selene Sifuentes

== Puerto Rico ==
coach: Camilo Estevez

- Adriana Cabrera
- Kitsa Escobar
- Nathalys Ceballos
- Sheila Hiraldo
- Jereny Espinal
- Joane Vergara
- Natalie Cabello
- Fabiola Martínez
- Nicolette Pope
- Jailene Maldonado
- Zugeily Soto
- Erika Graciani
- Ciris García
- Lilianushka Natal
- Zuleika Fuentes

== Uruguay ==
Uruguay announced their squad on July 6, 2015.

- Patricia Ré
- Paola Santos
- Paula Fynn
- Soledad Faedo
- Alejandra Scarrone
- Daniela Scarrone
- Alejandra Ferrari
- Camila Barreiro
- Martina Barreiro
- Eliana Falco
- Federica Cura
- Leticia Schinca
- Camila Vázquez
- Viviana Ferrari
- Iara Grosso
