= Puerto Rico at the 2015 Pan American Games =

- IOC code: PUR
- NOC: Puerto Rico Olympic Committee

in Toronto, Canada 10–26 July 2015
- Competitors: 252 in 26 sports
- Flag bearer (opening): Luis Rivera
- Flag bearer (closing): Mónica González Rivera
- Medals Ranked 17th: Gold 1 Silver 1 Bronze 13 Total 15

Pan American Games appearances (overview)
- 1951; 1955; 1959; 1963; 1967; 1971; 1975; 1979; 1983; 1987; 1991; 1995; 1999; 2003; 2007; 2011; 2015; 2019; 2023

Puerto Rico competed in the 2015 Pan American Games in Toronto, Canada, from July 10 to 26, 2015. Unlike the 2011 Pan American games, Puerto Rico did not perform well, earning only 1 gold and silver each, and 13 bronze medals.

Artistic gymnast Luis Rivera was the flagbearer of the team during the opening ceremony.

== Competitors ==
The following table lists Puerto Rico's delegation per sport and gender.

Sport	Men	Women	Total
Archery	2	0	2
Athletics	5	10	15
Baseball	24	18	42
Basketball	12	12	24
Beach volleyball	2	2	4
Bowling	2	2	4
Boxing	3	2	5
Canoeing	0	2	2
Cycling	2	0	2
Diving	1	2	3
Equestrian	2	2	4
Fencing	3	0	3
Golf	1	1	2
Gymnastics	5	2	7
Handball	15	15	30
Judo	2	1	3
Roller sports	1	0	1
Sailing	5	1	6
Shooting	5	4	9
Softball	0	15	15
Swimming	4	3	7
Table tennis	3	3	6
Taekwondo	3	3	6
Tennis	0	1	1
Triathlon	1	2	3
Volleyball	12	12	24
Water polo	0	13	13
Weightlifting	0	2	2
Wrestling	5	2	7
Total	120	132	252

== Medalists ==
Medal	Name(s)	Sport	Event	Date
Gold	Raúl Ríos; Fernando Monllor	Sailing	Snipe	July 19
Silver	Javier Culson	Athletics	Men's 400 m hurdles	July 23
Bronze	Augusto Miranda	Judo	Men's 73 kg	July 12
Bronze	Monica Puig	Tennis	Women's singles	July 16
Bronze	Franklin Gómez	Wrestling	Men's Freestyle 65 kg	July 17
Bronze	Yarimar Mercado	Shooting	Women's 50 metre rifle three positions	July 18
Bronze	Jaime Espinal	Wrestling	Men's Freestyle 86 kg	July 18
Bronze	Edgardo Lopez	Wrestling	Men's Freestyle 125 kg	July 18
Bronze	Enrique Figueroa; Franchesca Valdes	Sailing	Hobie 16	July 19
Bronze	Luis Colon III	Taekwondo	Men's 68 kg	July 20
Bronze	Carelyn Cordero; Adriana Díaz; Melanie Diaz	Table tennis	Women's team	July 21
Bronze	Brian Afanador; Hector Berrios; Daniel Gonzalez	Table tennis	Men's team	July 21
Bronze	José Rosario	Boxing	Men's lightweight	July 21
Bronze	Monica Gonzalez Rivera	Boxing	Women's flyweight	July 23
Bronze	Puerto Rico women's national softball team Karla Claudio; Dayanira Diaz; Quianna Diaz-Patterson; Elicia D'Orazio; Sahvanna Jaquish; Galis Lozada; Yairka Moran; Yahelis Munoz; Kiara Nazario; Aleshia Ocasio; Nicole Osterman; Gabriela Palacios; Shemiah Sanchez; Monica Santos; Yazmin Torres	Softball	Women's tournament	July 25

== Archery ==
Puerto Rico qualified one male archer based on its performance at the 2014 Pan American Championships. Later Puerto Rico qualified 1 more man based on its performance at the 2015 Copa Merengue.

Men

Athlete	Event	Ranking Round		Round of 32	Round of 16	Quarterfinals	Semifinals	Final / BM	Rank
Athlete	Event	Score	Seed	Opposition Score	Opposition Score	Opposition Score	Opposition Score	Opposition Score	Rank
Jose Irizarry	Individual	624	24	Crispin Duenas (CAN); W 7–5	Thomas Flossbach (GUA); L 0–6	did not advance			
Jean Pizarro	Individual	620	26	Hugo Franco (CUB); W 6–4	Daniel Pineda (COL); L 5–6	did not advance			

== Athletics ==
Puerto Rico qualified 15 athletes (five men and ten women).

Key

- Note–Ranks given for track events are for the entire round
- Q = Qualified for the next round
- q = Qualified for the next round as a fastest loser or, in field events, by position without achieving the qualifying target
- NR = National record
- GR = Games record
- PB = Personal best
- DNF = Did not finish
- NM = No mark
- N/A = Round not applicable for the event
- Bye = Athlete not required to compete in round

Men
Track

Athlete	Event	Heats		Final	
Athlete	Event	Result	Rank	Result	Rank
Andrés Arroyo	800 m	1:49.36	8 q	1:49.08	7
James Cesar Rosa	5000 m	—N/a		DNS	
Joseph Cesar Rosa	5000 m	—N/a		14:29.78	13
James Cesar Rosa	10,000 m	—N/a		30:39.66	9
Eric Alejandro	400 m hurdles	51.32	12	did not advance	
Javier Culson	400 m hurdles	50.54	6 Q	48.67	2nd place, silver medalist(s)

Women
Track

Athlete	Event	Heats		Final	
Athlete	Event	Result	Rank	Result	Rank
Dayleen Santana; Celiangeli Morales; Beatriz Cruz; Genoiska Cancel	4 x 100 metres relay	44.39	7 q	44.27	6
Carol Rodríguez; Alethia Marrero; Grace Claxton; Pariis García	4 x 400 metres relay	3:32.04 SB	8 q	3:33.16	6

Field

Athlete	Event	Final	
Athlete	Event	Distance	Position
Diamara Planell	Pole vault	4.15	10

Combined events – Heptathlon

Athlete	Event	100H	HJ	SP	200 m	LJ	JT	800 m	Final	Rank
Alysbeth Félix	Result	13.96	1.74	11.12	24.69	6.17	39.38	2:18.19	5810 NR	7
Alysbeth Félix	Points	984	903	603	915	902	655	848	5810 NR	7

== Baseball ==
Puerto Rico qualified a men's and women's baseball teams (the men's team consisted of 24 athletes, while the women's team had 18, for a total of 42 athletes). Puerto Rico has also qualified a women's team of 18 athletes, for a total of 42 entered competitors. Both teams ended up finishing their respective tournaments in fourth place, just of the podium.

=== Men's tournament ===
Roster

The following is Puerto Rico's men's baseball team for the 2015 Pan American Games. The position of the player is listed in parentheses.

- Richard Gonzalez (INF)
- Roberto Pena (C)
- Gabriel Robles (INF)
- Ramesis Rosa (P)
- Aldo Mendez (OF)
- Jeffry Dominguez (INF)
- Jose Ayala (P)
- Edgardo Baez (OF)
- Miguel Martinez (P)
- Joiset Feliciano (OF)
- Raul Rivera (P)
- Richard Thon (IF)
- Luis Cintron (P)
- Nelson Gomez (IF)
- Roy Geiger (P)
- Anthony Garcia (OF)
- Tomas Santiago (P)
- Andrés Santiago (P)
- Luis Ramos (P)
- Yomar Cruz (C)
- Luis Gonzalez (P)
- Hector Ponce (OF)
- Jose Soler (P)
- Beningno Cepeda (P)

Legend: C = Catcher, INF = Infielder, OF = Outfielder, P = Pitcher

Group A

Pos	Team	Pld	W	L	RF	RA	RD	PCT	GB	Qualification
1	Canada	6	5	1	38	15	+23	.833	—	Advance to the semifinals
2	United States	6	4	2	33	22	+11	.667 (Note: In the 3-way tie for 2nd place, all three teams went 1-1 head to head. The 2nd tiebreaker, Team Quality Balance, was used to identify and eliminate the last team in the group (Puerto Rico). The tie between the other two teams was then broken on the basis of the head-to-head result between them (United States defeating Cuba).)	1	Advance to the semifinals
3	Cuba	6	4	2	41	23	+18	.667	1	Advance to the semifinals
4	Puerto Rico	6	4	2	40	44	−4	.667	1	Advance to the semifinals
5	Dominican Republic	6	3	3	30	35	−5	.500	2	
6	Nicaragua	6	1	5	22	43	−21	.167	4	
7	Colombia	6	0	6	22	44	−22	.000	5	

Notes:

11 July 2015; 15:30	United States	9–10	Puerto Rico	President’s Choice Ajax Pan Am Ballpark – Second Field, Ajax; Attendance: 400
11 July 2015; 15:30		Boxscore		President’s Choice Ajax Pan Am Ballpark – Second Field, Ajax; Attendance: 400

13 July 2015; 12:00	Cuba	8–1	Puerto Rico	President’s Choice Ajax Pan Am Ballpark – Main Field, Ajax; Attendance: 2,133
13 July 2015; 12:00		Boxscore		President’s Choice Ajax Pan Am Ballpark – Main Field, Ajax; Attendance: 2,133

14 July 2015; 15:30	Dominican Republic	6–12	Puerto Rico	President’s Choice Ajax Pan Am Ballpark – Second Field, Ajax; Attendance: 623
14 July 2015; 15:30		Boxscore		President’s Choice Ajax Pan Am Ballpark – Second Field, Ajax; Attendance: 623

15 July 2015; 15:30	Puerto Rico	8–7	Colombia	President’s Choice Ajax Pan Am Ballpark – Second Field, Ajax; Attendance: 738
15 July 2015; 15:30		Boxscore		President’s Choice Ajax Pan Am Ballpark – Second Field, Ajax; Attendance: 738

16 July 2015; 19:00	Puerto Rico	4–11	Canada	President’s Choice Ajax Pan Am Ballpark – Main Field, Ajax; Attendance: 4,727
16 July 2015; 19:00		Boxscore		President’s Choice Ajax Pan Am Ballpark – Main Field, Ajax; Attendance: 4,727

17 July 2015; 12:00	Puerto Rico	5–3	Nicaragua	President’s Choice Ajax Pan Am Ballpark – Main Field, Ajax; Attendance: 724
17 July 2015; 12:00		Boxscore		President’s Choice Ajax Pan Am Ballpark – Main Field, Ajax; Attendance: 724

Semifinals

18 July 2015; 19:00	Canada	7–1	Puerto Rico	President’s Choice Ajax Pan Am Ballpark – Main Field, Ajax; Attendance: 4,827
18 July 2015; 19:00		Boxscore		President’s Choice Ajax Pan Am Ballpark – Main Field, Ajax; Attendance: 4,827

Bronze medal match

19 July 2015; 13:00	(bronze) Cuba	7–6	Puerto Rico	President’s Choice Ajax Pan Am Ballpark – Main Field, Ajax; Attendance: 4,914
19 July 2015; 13:00		Boxscore		President’s Choice Ajax Pan Am Ballpark – Main Field, Ajax; Attendance: 4,914

=== Women's tournament ===
Roster

The Puerto Rico women's national baseball team roster for the 2015 Pan American Games (as of July 19, 2015):

- Lisandra Berríos (IF)
- Angela Castro (U)
- Yinoska Claudio (IF)
- Katiria Dávila (P/IF)
- Noelia De Jesús (P)
- Luz Feliciano (P/IF)
- Dayaniris Flores (C)
- Marlene Gómez (OF)
- Kiara Hernández (P)
- Kiara Irizarry (IF)
- Julitza López (OF)
- Fiordelis Martínez (IF/OF)
- Michelle Martínez (OF)
- Adrix Paradizo (P/IF)
- Diamilette Quiles (IF)
- Janilis Rivera (C)
- Enid Santana (P)
- María Zayas (P)

Legend: C = Catcher, IF = Infielder, OF = Outfielder, P = Pitcher, U = Utility fielder

Group A

Pos	Team	Pld	W	L	RF	RA	RD	PCT	GB	Qualification
1	United States	4	4	0	33	7	+26	1.000	—	Advanced to the Gold medal match
2	Canada	4	3	1	26	9	+17	.750	1	Advance to the Bronze medal match
3	Venezuela	4	2	2	32	30	+2	.500	2	Advance to the Bronze medal match
4	Puerto Rico	4	1	3	17	27	−10	.250	3	
5	Cuba	4	0	4	8	43	−35	.000	4	

21 July 2015; 15:00	Cuba	5–6	Puerto Rico	President’s Choice Ajax Pan Am Ballpark, Ajax; Attendance: 975
21 July 2015; 15:00		Boxscore		President’s Choice Ajax Pan Am Ballpark, Ajax; Attendance: 975

22 July 2015; 15:00	Canada	3–2	Puerto Rico	President’s Choice Ajax Pan Am Ballpark, Ajax; Attendance: 1,775
22 July 2015; 15:00		Boxscore		President’s Choice Ajax Pan Am Ballpark, Ajax; Attendance: 1,775

23 July 2015; 19:00	Puerto Rico	0–9	United States	President’s Choice Ajax Pan Am Ballpark, Ajax; Attendance: 547
23 July 2015; 19:00		Boxscore		President’s Choice Ajax Pan Am Ballpark, Ajax; Attendance: 547

24 July 2015; 15:00	Venezuela	10–9	Puerto Rico	President’s Choice Ajax Pan Am Ballpark, Ajax; Attendance: 1,803
24 July 2015; 15:00		Boxscore		President’s Choice Ajax Pan Am Ballpark, Ajax; Attendance: 1,803

== Basketball ==
Puerto Rico qualified a men's and women's teams. Each team will consist of 12 athletes, for a total of 24.

=== Men's tournament ===
The Puerto Rico men's national basketball team roster for the 2015 Pan American Games.

Puerto Rico men's national basketball team – 2015 Pan American Games roster
Players
Coaches

Pos.	No.	Name	Age – Date of birth	Height	Club
C	4	Villafañe, Luis	34 – 21 Jun 1981	2.09 m (6 ft 10 in)	(Puerto Rico) Cangrejeros de Santurce
G	5	Barea, J. J.	31 – 26 Jun 1984	1.80 m (5 ft 11 in)	(United States) Dallas Mavericks
PF	6	Young, Kevin	25 – 24 Jun 1990	2.05 m (6 ft 9 in)	(Puerto Rico) Brujos de Guayama
SG	7	Mojica, Javier	30 – 31 Aug 1984	1.92 m (6 ft 4 in)	(Puerto Rico) Cangrejeros de Santurce
PF	8	Clavell, Gilberto	25 – 10 Aug 1989	2.00 m (6 ft 7 in)	(Finland) Kouvot
F	9	Collier, Devon	24 – 20 Jan 1991	2.04 m (6 ft 8 in)	(Israel) Bnei Herzliya
G	10	Ayuso, Elías Larry	38 – 27 Mar 1977	1.88 m (6 ft 2 in)	(Puerto Rico) Mets de Guaynabo
SF	11	Carmona, Alejandro	32 – 14 Jun 1983	1.94 m (6 ft 4 in)	(Puerto Rico) Brujos de Guayama
G	12	Browne, Gary	22 – 24 Mar 1993	1.85 m (6 ft 1 in)	(United States) West Virginia Mountaineers
G	13	De Jesús, Jezreel	24 – 5 May 1991	1.86 m (6 ft 1 in)	(Puerto Rico) Maratonistas de Coamo
PF	14	Clemente, Ramón	29 – 11 Dec 1985	1.98 m (6 ft 6 in)	(Argentina) Obras Sanitarias
F	15	Graham III, Paul	29 – 2 Dec 1985	1.96 m (6 ft 5 in)	(Puerto Rico) Piratas de Quebradillas

Head coach

(United States) Rick Pitino

Legend

- Age – as of 16 July 2015
- Club – before start of Games

Group A

Team	Pld	W	L	PF	PA	PD	Pts	Qualification
Brazil	3	3	0	264	206	+58	6	Qualified for the semifinals
United States	3	2	1	270	225	+45	5	Qualified for the semifinals
Puerto Rico	3	1	2	218	266	−48	4	
Venezuela	3	0	3	198	253	−55	3	

21 July 2015
10:30

Report

Brazil	92–59	Puerto Rico
Scoring by quarter: 31–6, 29–11, 19–25, 13–17
Pts: Hettsheimeir 19; Rebs: Batista 11; Asts: Lima 6		Pts: Clavell, De Jesús 8 Rebs: Villafañe, Young, Collier 4 Asts: Young 3

Ryerson Athletic Centre, Toronto

22 July 2015
21:00

Report

Puerto Rico	70–102	United States
Scoring by quarter: 19–29, 10–36, 23–20, 18–27
Pts: Mojica 15; Rebs: Villafañe 8 Asts: Barea 3		Pts: Brown 16; Rebs: Tarczewski 7 Asts: Brown 6

Ryerson Athletic Centre, Toronto

23 July 2015
13:30

Report

Puerto Rico	89–72	Venezuela
Scoring by quarter: 23–13, 23–25, 15–23, 28–11
Pts: Barea 27; Rebs: Clemente 7 Asts: Barea 6		Pts: Lewis 19; Rebs: Colmenares 8 Asts: Vargas, Vargas Diaz 3

Ryerson Athletic Centre, Toronto

Fifth place match

24 July 2015
21:00

Report

Puerto Rico	85–105	Argentina
Scoring by quarter: 21–22, 18–20, 24–32, 22–31
Pts: de Jesus 12; Rebs: Clavell 7 Asts: Browne 5		Pts: Campazzo 17; Rebs: Delía 12; Asts: Campazzo, Laprovíttola 4

Ryerson Athletic Centre, Toronto

=== Women's tournament ===
The Puerto Rico women's national basketball team roster for the 2015 Pan American Games.

Puerto Rico women's national basketball team – 2015 Pan American Games roster
Players
Coaches

Pos.	No.	Name	Age – Date of birth	Height	Club
G	5	Delgado, Yashira	22 – 23 Jul 1992	1.65 m (5 ft 5 in)
SG	6	Sepúlveda, Jazmine	30 – 10 Apr 1985	1.72 m (5 ft 8 in)
C	7	Bermúdez, Angelica	26 – 2 Jul 1989	1.87 m (6 ft 2 in)
SG	8	Cortijo, Carla	27 – 21 Jul 1987	1.70 m (5 ft 7 in)
SG	9	Gibson, Allison	22 – 27 Mar 1993	1.52 m (5 ft 0 in)
F	10	Meléndez, Tayra	21 – 29 Oct 1993	1.80 m (5 ft 11 in)
C	11	García, Sandra	24 – 7 Aug 1990	1.87 m (6 ft 2 in)
G	13	Diaz Hassan, Natalie	21 – 28 Apr 1994	1.72 m (5 ft 8 in)
F	14	Plácido, Marie	27 – 18 Aug 1987	1.70 m (5 ft 7 in)
PF	21	Roma, Sofia Laura	18 – 21 Nov 1996	1.88 m (6 ft 2 in)
F	23	Vargas, Yoy Ling	23 – 26 Sep 1991	1.83 m (6 ft 0 in)
G	32	Martínez, Damika	23 – 7 Jun 1992	1.52 m (5 ft 0 in)

Head coach

- Omar Gonzalez

Legend

- Age – as of 15 July 2015
- Club – before start of Games

Group A

Team	Pld	W	L	PF	PA	PD	Pts	Qualification
United States	3	3	0	262	201	+61	6	Qualified for the semifinals
Brazil	3	2	1	204	186	+18	5	Qualified for the semifinals
Puerto Rico	3	1	2	210	209	+1	4	
Dominican Republic	3	0	3	163	243	−80	3	

16 July 2015
13:30

Report

Puerto Rico	76–54	Dominican Republic
Scoring by quarter: 25–14, 24–14, 13–19, 14–7
Pts: Cortijo Sanchez 15; Rebs: Cortijo Sanchez 8 Asts: Sepúlveda, Cortijo Sanchez 3		Pts: Monsac 16; Rebs: Andujar 7 Asts: Monsac 3

Ryerson Athletic Centre, Toronto
Referees: Juan Fernández (ARG)

17 July 2015
13:30

Report

Puerto Rico	57–62	Brazil
Scoring by quarter: 14–20, 12–11, 14–15, 17–16
Pts: Cortijo Sanchez 20; Rebs: Bermudez 7 Asts: Cortijo Sanchez 2		Pts: de Paula 13; Rebs: Jacob 10; Asts: Teixeira, Santos 2

Ryerson Athletic Centre, Toronto

18 July 2015
21:00

Report

United States	93–77	Puerto Rico
Scoring by quarter: 24–23, 22–18, 21–23, 26–13
Pts: Stewart 24; Rebs: Coates 13; Asts: Jefferson 6		Pts: Cortijo Sanchez 24; Rebs: Gibson, García, Martinez 3 Asts: Cortijo Sanchez 5

Ryerson Athletic Centre, Toronto

Fifth place match

19 July 2015
21:00

Report

Puerto Rico	56–77	Argentina
Scoring by quarter: 10–19, 14–15, 19–22, 13–21
Pts: Delgado 19; Rebs: Bermudez, García 9 Asts: Delgado 2		Pts: Vega 18; Rebs: Vega 9 Asts: Gretter 8

Ryerson Athletic Centre, Toronto

== Beach volleyball ==
Puerto Rico qualified a men's and women's pair for a total of four athletes.

Athlete	Event	Preliminary Round			Quarterfinals	Semifinals	Finals	
Athlete	Event	Opposition Score	Opposition Score	Opposition Score	Opposition Score	Opposition Score	Opposition Score	Rank
	Men's							
	Women's							

== Boxing ==
Puerto Rico qualified five boxers (three men and two women).

Athlete	Event	Preliminaries	Quarterfinals	Semifinals	Final	Rank
Athlete	Event	Opposition Result	Opposition Result	Opposition Result	Opposition Result	Rank
Jeyvier Cintrón	Men's flyweight	Bye	Vargas (USA); L 1–2	did not advance		=5
José Rosario	Men's lightweight	Bye	Zalazar (HON); W WO	Delgado (MEX); L 0–3	Did not advance	3rd place, bronze medalist(s)
Magdiel Cotto	Men's middleweight	Sánchez (DOM); L 0–3	did not advance			=9
Monica Gonzalez Rivera	Women's flyweight	—N/a	Cedeno (VEN); W 2–0	Esparza (USA); L 0–3	Did not advance	3rd place, bronze medalist(s)
Kiria Tapia	Women's light welterweight	—N/a	Veyre (CAN); L 1–2	did not advance		=5

== Canoeing ==
=== Sprint ===
Puerto Rico qualified 2 athletes in the sprint discipline (2 in women's kayak).

Women

Athlete	Event	Heats		Semifinals		Final	
Athlete	Event	Time	Rank	Time	Rank	Time	Rank
Melissa Reyes	K-1 500 m	46.247	5 QS	46.228	4	Did not advance	10
Melissa Reyes	K-1 500 m	2:06.734	5 QS	2:06.818	3 QF	2:17.128	9
Mariecarmen Rivera; Melissa Reyes	K-2 500 m	—N/a				2:01.956	8

Qualification Legend: QF = Qualify to final; QS = Qualify to semifinal

== Cycling ==
Puerto Rico qualified two male cyclists, one each in the road and track disciplines.

=== Road ===
Athlete	Event	Final	
Athlete	Event	Time	Rank
Efren Ortega	Road race	3:46:35	12
Efren Ortega	Time trial	52:14.62	15

=== Track ===
Omnium

Athlete	Event	Scratch		Points race		Elimination race	Individual pursuit		Time trial		Points race	Total points	Rank
Athlete	Event	Time	Rank	Points	Rank	Rank	Time	Rank	Rank	Time	Rank	Total points	Rank
Eduardo Colon Ortiz	Men's omnium	DNF		4:57.454	11	10	1:08.419	9	14.127	9	DNF		
11

== Diving ==
Puerto Rico qualified three divers (one male and two women).

Athlete	Event	Preliminary		Final	
Athlete	Event	Points	Rank	Points	Rank
Rafael Quintero	Men's 3 m springboard	350.15	10 Q	409.00	5
Rafael Quintero	Men's 10 m platform	378.65	10 Q	328.80	12
Luisa Jimenez Aragunde	Women's 3 m springboard	262.05	8 Q	288.80	7
Jeniffer Fernandez	Women's 3 m springboard	256.80	9 Q	256.35	10
Luisa Jimenez Aragunde; Jeniffer Fernandez	Women's synchronized 3 m springboard	—N/a		241.59	6

== Equestrian ==
Puerto Rico qualified four equestrians across all three disciplines.

=== Dressage ===
Athlete	Horse	Event	Round 1		Round 2			Final	
Athlete	Horse	Event	Score	Rank	Score	Rank	Total	Score	Rank
Luis Denizard	Royal Affair	Individual	69.395	13	70.211	9 Q	139.606	70.725	=13

== Fencing ==
Puerto Rico qualified 3 male fencers. Originally the country also qualified men's sabre and women's foil teams, but for unknown reasons the country declined those quotas.

Athlete	Event	Pool Round		Round of 16	Quarterfinals	Semifinals	Final / BM	
Athlete	Event	Result	Seed	Opposition Score	Opposition Score	Opposition Score	Opposition Score	Rank
Angelo Justiniano	Foil	1	14 Q	Van Haaster (CAN); L 9–15	did not advance			
Jonathan Lugo	Foil	1	15 Q	Meinhardt (USA); L 8–15	did not advance			
Angelo Justiniano; Jonathan Lugo; Jabnyell Ortega Rexach	Foil Team	—N/a			Brazil; L 19–45	Canada; L 21–45	Chile; L 30–45	8

== Golf ==
Puerto Rico qualified two golfers (one male and one female).

Athlete(s)	Event	Final					
Athlete(s)	Event	Round 1	Round 2	Round 3	Round 4	Total	Rank
Erick Juan Morales	Men's individual	71	76	74	76	297 (+9)	=20
Maria Torres	Women's individual	77	75	79	76	307 (+19)	=16
Erick Juan Morales; Maria Torres	Mixed team	148	151	153	152	604 (+28)	14

== Gymnastics ==
=== Artistic ===
Puerto Rico qualified 7 gymnasts, only six competed (five men and one woman).

Men
Team & Individual Qualification

Athlete	Event	Final							
Athlete	Event	Apparatus						Total	Rank
Athlete	Event	F	PH	R	V	PB	HB	Total	Rank
Rafael Morales Casado	Qualification	14.100	11.850	13.600	14.150			53.700	45
Tommy Ramos Nin	Qualification			15.400 Q		13.000	13.050	41.450	50
Angel Ramos	Qualification	14.050	11.650	13.450	14.300	13.850	14.600	81.900	11 Q
Tristian Perez	Qualification	13.900	12.350		14.650	13.250	14.150	68.300	31
Alexis Torres	Qualification		10.550	15.050 Q	13.950	12.800	12.750	65.100	35
Total	Team	42.050	35.850	44.050	43.100	40.100	41.800	246.950	7

Qualification Legend: Q = Qualified to apparatus final

Individual Finals

Athlete	Event	Apparatus						Total	Rank
Athlete	Event	F	PH	R	V	PB	HB	Total	Rank
Angel Ramos	All-around	13.300	1.500	13.300	14.400	13.350	13.250	65.800	23
Tommy Ramos Nin	Rings	—N/a		15.350	—N/a			15.350	4
Alexis Torres	Rings	—N/a		15.125	—N/a			15.125	6

Women
Individual Qualification

Athlete	Event	Qualification					
Athlete	Event	Apparatus				Total	Rank
Athlete	Event	V	UB	BB	F	Total	Rank
Paula Mejias	Qualification	14.900 Q	8.550	10.400	13.950 Q	47.800	24 Q

Qualification Legend: Q = Qualified to apparatus final

Individual Finals

Athlete	Event	Apparatus				Total	Rank
Athlete	Event	F	V	UB	BB	Total	Rank
Paula Mejias	All-around	13.500	11.650	10.150	13.000	48.300	19
Paula Mejias	Floor	13.125	—N/a			13.125	7
Paula Mejias	Vault	—N/a	6.112	—N/a		6.112	8

== Handball ==
Puerto Rico qualified a men's and women's teams. Each team will consist of 15 athletes, for a total of 30.

=== Men's tournament ===
The Puerto Rico handball men's team that will compete at the 2015 Pan American Games:

Head coach: (Puerto Rico) Harold Millan

No.	Pos.	Name	Date of birth (age)	Height	App.	Goals	Club
1		Pascual Pacheco	12 April 1990 (age 36)
2		Alberto Pizarro	19 February 1984 (age 42)
3		Jose Antonio Sanchez	10 April 1986 (age 40)
5		Orlando Garcia	15 November 1985 (age 40)
6		Angel Benitez	6 August 1982 (age 44)
8		Jorge Nazario	1 October 1992 (age 33)
9		Jose Ceballos	8 April 1988 (age 38)
10		Hector Hiraldo	16 August 1992 (age 33)
11		Jesus Arroyo	27 June 1981 (age 45)
12		Steven Rodriguez	27 May 1994 (age 32)
14		Kristopher Semidey	9 June 1985 (age 41)
17		Joshua Mercado	17 December 1991 (age 34)
18		Ruben Ayala	9 July 1990 (age 36)
22		Edwin Brtio	26 March 1989 (age 37)
24		Juan Santos Ramos	29 May 1986 (age 40)

Group B

Team	Pld	W	D	L	GF	GA	GD	Pts	Qualification
Argentina	3	3	0	0	103	63	+40	6	Qualified for the Semifinals
Chile	3	1	1	1	87	84	+3	3	Qualified for the Semifinals
Cuba	3	1	1	1	87	89	−2	3	
Puerto Rico	3	0	0	3	68	109	−41	0	

July 17; 20:30	Chile	33–23	Puerto Rico	Exhibition Centre – Hall B Referees: Minore, Marina (ARG)
July 17; 20:30	Araya 8	(18–7)	Nazario 9	Exhibition Centre – Hall B Referees: Minore, Marina (ARG)
July 17; 20:30	3× (yellow card) 2× (suspension) 1× (red card)	report	3× (yellow card) 7× (suspension)	Exhibition Centre – Hall B Referees: Minore, Marina (ARG)

July 19; 18:30	Puerto Rico	22–38	Argentina	Exhibition Centre – Hall B Referees: Lemes, Sosa (URU)
July 19; 18:30	Mercado 7	(8–18)	Fernandez 8	Exhibition Centre – Hall B Referees: Lemes, Sosa (URU)
July 19; 18:30	2× (yellow card) 4× (suspension)	report	4× (yellow card) 3× (suspension)	Exhibition Centre – Hall B Referees: Lemes, Sosa (URU)

July 21; 18:30	Cuba	38–23	Puerto Rico	Exhibition Centre – Hall B Referees: Lemes, Sosa (URU)
July 21; 18:30	Toledano 13	(22–13)	Hiraldo 7	Exhibition Centre – Hall B Referees: Lemes, Sosa (URU)
July 21; 18:30	1× (yellow card) 6× (suspension)	report	4× (yellow card) 5× (suspension)	Exhibition Centre – Hall B Referees: Lemes, Sosa (URU)

Classification semifinals

July 23; 11:00	Canada	24–29	Puerto Rico	Exhibition Centre – Hall B Referees: Lemes, Sosa (URU)
July 23; 11:00	Walder 7	(10–14)	Hiraldo 15	Exhibition Centre – Hall B Referees: Lemes, Sosa (URU)
July 23; 11:00	3× (yellow card) 3× (suspension)	report	3× (yellow card) 2× (suspension)	Exhibition Centre – Hall B Referees: Lemes, Sosa (URU)

Fifth place match

July 25
13:00
Puerto Rico
39–38 (ET)
Cuba
Exhibition Centre – Hall B
Referees: Lemes, Sosa (URU)
Hiraldo 13
(17–15)
Hernandez 15
3× (yellow card) 3× (suspension)
report
3× (yellow card) 4× (suspension) 2× (red card)

FT: 33–33 ET: 6–5

=== Women's tournament ===
coach: Camilo Estevez

- Adriana Cabrera
- Kitsa Escobar
- Nathalys Ceballos
- Sheila Hiraldo
- Jereny Espinal
- Joane Vergara
- Natalie Cabello
- Fabiola Martínez
- Nicolette Pope
- Jailene Maldonado
- Zugeily Soto
- Erika Graciani
- Ciris García
- Lilianushka Natal
- Zuleika Fuentes

Group A

Team	Pld	W	D	L	GF	GA	GD	Pts	Qualification
Brazil	3	3	0	0	120	52	+68	6	Qualified for the Semifinals
Mexico	3	2	0	1	83	86	−3	4	Qualified for the Semifinals
Puerto Rico	3	0	1	2	72	98	−26	1	
Canada	3	0	1	2	55	94	−39	1	

July 16; 11:30	Brazil	38–21	Puerto Rico	Exhibition Centre – Hall B Referees: Paolantoni, Zanikian (ARG)
July 16; 11:30	Nascimento, Silva 7	(15–10)	Ceballos 7	Exhibition Centre – Hall B Referees: Paolantoni, Zanikian (ARG)
July 16; 11:30	3× (yellow card) 2× (suspension)	Report	2× (yellow card) 5× (suspension)	Exhibition Centre – Hall B Referees: Paolantoni, Zanikian (ARG)

July 18; 13:30	Puerto Rico	30–39	Mexico	Exhibition Centre – Hall B Referees: Minore, Marina (ARG)
July 18; 13:30	Cabrera, Ceballos 6	(17–14)	Rocha 6	Exhibition Centre – Hall B Referees: Minore, Marina (ARG)
July 18; 13:30	3× (yellow card) 9× (suspension) 1× (red card)	Report	3× (yellow card) 3× (suspension)	Exhibition Centre – Hall B Referees: Minore, Marina (ARG)

July 20; 11:30	Puerto Rico	21–21	Canada	Exhibition Centre – Hall B Referees: Paolantoni, Zanikian (ARG)
July 20; 11:30	Ceballos 7	(10–7)	Perry 7	Exhibition Centre – Hall B Referees: Paolantoni, Zanikian (ARG)
July 20; 11:30	2× (yellow card) 3× (suspension)	report	2× (yellow card) 5× (suspension)	Exhibition Centre – Hall B Referees: Paolantoni, Zanikian (ARG)

Classification semifinals

July 22; 11:00	Puerto Rico	36–34	Chile	Exhibition Centre – Hall B Referees: Paoloantoni, Zanikian (ARG)
July 22; 11:00	Ceballos 11	(21–18)	Feuchtmann 6	Exhibition Centre – Hall B Referees: Paoloantoni, Zanikian (ARG)
July 22; 11:00	2× (yellow card)	report	2× (yellow card) 3× (suspension)	Exhibition Centre – Hall B Referees: Paoloantoni, Zanikian (ARG)

Fifth place match

July 24; 13:00	Puerto Rico	27–40	Cuba	Exhibition Centre – Hall B Referees: Pinto, Menezes (BRA)
July 24; 13:00	three players 5	(14–20)	Reyes, Barrio 7	Exhibition Centre – Hall B Referees: Pinto, Menezes (BRA)
July 24; 13:00	2× (yellow card) 2× (suspension)	report	1× (yellow card) 6× (suspension)	Exhibition Centre – Hall B Referees: Pinto, Menezes (BRA)

== Judo ==
Puerto Rico qualified a team of five judokas (two men and three women). However, the nation only sent three judokas to compete.

Athlete	Event	Round of 16	Quarterfinals	Semifinals	Repechage	Final / BM	
Athlete	Event	Opposition Result	Opposition Result	Opposition Result	Opposition Result	Opposition Result	Rank
Augusto Miranda	Men's −73 kg	Bye	Arthur Margelidon (CAN); W 001S1-000	Magdiel Estrada (CUB); L 000S2-100S1	Bye	Fernando Ibañez (ECU); W 000S1-000S2	3rd place, bronze medalist(s)
Gadiel Miranda	Men's −81 kg	Bye	Magdiel Estrada (USA); L 000S2-101	Did not advance	Bye	Magdiel Estrada (BRA); L 000S1-101S1	=5
Jeannette Rodriguez	Women's −57 kg	Anriquelis Barrios (VEN); L 100-000	did not advance				

== Roller sports ==
Puerto Rico qualified one male roller skater.

=== Speed ===
Men

Athlete	Event	Semifinal		Final	
Athlete	Event	Time	Rank	Time/Points	Rank
Javier Sepulveda	200 m time trial	—N/a		17.184	6
Javier Sepulveda	500 m	40.224	4	did not advance	
Javier Sepulveda	10,000 m points race	—N/a		did not start	

== Sailing ==
Puerto Rico qualified 4 boats (6 sailors).

Athlete	Event	Race													Net Points	Final Rank
Athlete	Event	1	2	3	4	5	6	7	8	9	10	11	12	M*	Net Points	Final Rank
Juan Carlos Perdomo	Laser	2	6	11	10	14	8	8	10	7	(15)	14	8	DNQ	98	9
Ramón González	Sunfish	(12)	11	11	11	6	6	4	12	9	9	7	6	DNQ	92	9
Raúl Ríos; Fernando Monllor	Snipe	2	2	2	(7)	1	1	1	1	1	4	1	2	2	20	1st place, gold medalist(s)
Enrique Figueroa; Franchesca Valdes	Hobie 16	5	1	5	(7)	3	1	1	3	6	6	4	7	2	44	3rd place, bronze medalist(s)

== Shooting ==
Puerto Rico qualified nine shooters.

Men

Athlete	Event	Qualification		Semifinal		Final	
Athlete	Event	Points	Rank	Points	Rank	Points	Rank
Giovanni Gonzalez Rivera	10 metre air pistol	570	6 Q	—N/a		155.7	4
Giovanni Gonzalez Rivera	50 metre pistol	531	14	—N/a		did not advance	
Lucas Rafael Bennazar Ortiz	Trap	97	22	did not advance			
Lucas Rafael Bennazar Ortiz	Double trap	118	10	did not advance			
José Torres Laboy	Double trap	105	14	did not advance			
Luis Bermudez	Skeet	120	2 Q	12	5	did not advance	
Jesus Medero	Skeet	113	20	did not advance			

Women

Athlete	Event	Qualification		Semifinal		Final	
Athlete	Event	Points	Rank	Points	Rank	Points	Rank
Amy Bock	10 metre air rifle	408.9	8 Q	—N/a		163.3	4
Yarimar Mercado	10 metre air rifle	405.4	15	—N/a		did not advance	
Amy Bock	50 metre rifle three positions	557	20	—N/a		did not advance	
Yarimar Mercado	50 metre rifle three positions	571	6 Q	—N/a		435.2	3rd place, bronze medalist(s)
Ana Latorre	Trap	58	6 Q	11	3 QB	11	4
Vivian Rodriguez	Trap	50	8	did not advance			

== Softball ==
Puerto Rico qualified a women's squad of 15 athletes.

=== Women's tournament ===
Roster

Puerto Rico's roster consisted of 15 athletes.

- Karla Claudio
- Dayanira Diaz
- Quianna Diaz-Patterson
- Elicia D'Orazio
- Sahvanna Jaquish
- Galis Lozada
- Yairka Moran
- Yahelis Munoz
- Kiara Nazario
- Aleshia Ocasio
- Nicole Osterman
- Gabriela Palacios
- Shemiah Sanchez
- Monica Santos
- Yazmin Torres

Group A

Team	Pld	W	L	RF	RA	RD	Qualification
United States	5	5	0	43	4	+39	Qualified for the semifinals
Canada	5	4	1	21	14	+7	Qualified for the semifinals
Puerto Rico	5	3	2	18	17	+1	Qualified for the semifinals
Brazil	5	2	3	7	19	−12	Qualified for the semifinals
Cuba	5	1	4	10	23	−13	
Dominican Republic	5	0	5	14	36	−22	

19 July 2015; 19:00	Puerto Rico	2 – 9	United States	President’s Choice Ajax Pan Am Ballpark, Ajax; Attendance: 234
19 July 2015; 19:00		Boxscore		President’s Choice Ajax Pan Am Ballpark, Ajax; Attendance: 234

20 July 2015; 16:30	Puerto Rico	11 – 5	Dominican Republic	President’s Choice Ajax Pan Am Ballpark, Ajax; Attendance: 375
20 July 2015; 16:30		Boxscore		President’s Choice Ajax Pan Am Ballpark, Ajax; Attendance: 375

21 July 2015; 14:00	Puerto Rico	3 – 2	Cuba	President’s Choice Ajax Pan Am Ballpark, Ajax; Attendance: 832
21 July 2015; 14:00		Boxscore		President’s Choice Ajax Pan Am Ballpark, Ajax; Attendance: 832

22 July 2015; 14:00	Puerto Rico	2 – 0	Brazil	President’s Choice Ajax Pan Am Ballpark, Ajax; Attendance: 460
22 July 2015; 14:00		Boxscore		President’s Choice Ajax Pan Am Ballpark, Ajax; Attendance: 460

23 July 2015; 19:00	Canada	1 – 0	Puerto Rico	President’s Choice Ajax Pan Am Ballpark, Ajax; Attendance: 2,050
23 July 2015; 19:00		Boxscore		President’s Choice Ajax Pan Am Ballpark, Ajax; Attendance: 2,050

Semifinals

24 July 2015; 16:30	Puerto Rico	12 – 2 (4)	Brazil	President’s Choice Ajax Pan Am Ballpark, Ajax; Attendance: 1,050
24 July 2015; 16:30		Boxscore		President’s Choice Ajax Pan Am Ballpark, Ajax; Attendance: 1,050

Bronze medal match

25 July 2015; 17:00	Canada	7 – 4	Puerto Rico (bronze)	President’s Choice Ajax Pan Am Ballpark, Ajax; Attendance: 2,267
25 July 2015; 17:00		Boxscore		President’s Choice Ajax Pan Am Ballpark, Ajax; Attendance: 2,267

== Swimming ==
Puerto Rico qualified seven swimmers (four men and three women).

Athlete	Event	Heat		Final	
Athlete	Event	Time	Rank	Time	Rank
Erik Risolvato	50 m freestyle	22.48	8 FA	22.22	4
Christian Bayo	400 m freestyle	3:53.93	10 FB	3:54.11	12
Christian Bayo	1500 m freestyle	—N/a		15:49.47	14
Yeziel Morales	1500 m freestyle	—N/a		DNS	
Yeziel Morales	200 m backstroke	2:02.89	12 FB	2:02.26	11
Andrew Torres	100 m butterfly	54.69	15 FB	54.77	13
Andrew Torres	200 m butterfly	1:59.83	8 FA	1:59.37	5
Christian Bayo	400 metre individual medley	4:28.54	12 FB	4:27.15 NR	12
Yeziel Morales	400 metre individual medley	DNS		did not advance	

Women

Athlete	Event	Heat		Final	
Athlete	Event	Time	Rank	Time	Rank
Vanessa García	50 m freestyle	25.37	8 FA	25.21	8
Vanessa García	100 m freestyle	55.45	7 FA	55.26	7
Tereysa Lehnertz	100 m butterfly	1:02.43	16 FB	1:02.02	14
Tereysa Lehnertz	200 m butterfly	2:18.57	12 FB	2:18.05	12
Barbara Caraballo	200 metre individual medley	DNS		did not advance	

== Table tennis ==
Puerto Rico qualified a men's and women's team for a total of six athletes.

Men

Athlete	Event	Group Stage				Round of 32	Round of 16	Quarterfinals	Semifinals	Final / BM	
Athlete	Event	Opposition Result	Opposition Result	Opposition Result	Rank	Opposition Result	Opposition Result	Opposition Result	Opposition Result	Opposition Result	Rank
Brian Afanador	Singles	Diaz (VEN); W 4–0	Tabachnik (ARG); L 1–4	Gavilan (PAR); W 4–1	2 Q	Rodriguez (PER); W 4–2	Monteiro (BRA); L 0–4	did not advance			=9
Hector Berrios	Singles	Madrid (MEX); L 0–4	Martinez (CUB); W 4–3	Ramirez (GUA); L 0–4	3	did not advance					
Daniel Gonzalez	Singles	Villa (MEX); W 4–2	Aguirre (PAR); L 0–4	Blas (PER); W 4–2	2 Q	Campos (CUB); L 0–4	did not advance				=17
Brian Afanador; Hector Berrios; Daniel Gonzalez	Team	Canada; W 3–2	Guatemala; W 3–0	—N/a	1 Q	—N/a		United States; W 3–2	Paraguay; L 0–3	Did not advance	3rd place, bronze medalist(s)

Women

Athlete	Event	Group Stage				Round of 32	Round of 16	Quarterfinals	Semifinals	Final / BM	
Athlete	Event	Opposition Result	Opposition Result	Opposition Result	Rank	Opposition Result	Opposition Result	Opposition Result	Opposition Result	Opposition Result	Rank
Carelyn Cordero	Singles	Zheng (USA); L 0–4	Kumahara (BRA); L 1–4	Gonzalez (VEN); L 2–4	4	did not advance					=21
Adriana Díaz	Singles	Umbacia (ARG); W 4–0	Castillo (CUB); W 4–3	Umbacia (COL); W 4–1	1 Q	Bye	Arvelo (VEN); W 4–1	Wu (USA); L 1–4	did not advance		=5
Melanie Diaz	Singles	Galvez (ECU); W 4–1	Zhang (USA); L 0–4	Low (CHI); W 4–2	2 Q	Arguelles (ARG); W 4–2	Zhang (CAN); L 0–4	did not advance			=9
Carelyn Cordero; Adriana Díaz; Melanie Diaz	Team	Mexico; W 3–2	Chile; W 3–2	—N/a	1 Q	—N/a		Argentina; W 3–0	Brazil; L 1–3	Did not advance	3rd place, bronze medalist(s)

== Taekwondo ==
Puerto Rico qualified a team of six athletes (three men and three women).

Athlete	Event	Round of 16	Quarterfinals	Semifinals	Repechage	Bronze Medal	Final	
Athlete	Event	Opposition Result	Opposition Result	Opposition Result	Opposition Result	Opposition Result	Opposition Result	Rank
Rafael Mota Jr	Men's -58kg	Peralta (ECU); L 13–14	did not advance					
Luis Colon III	Men's -68kg	Morales (CHI); W 17–5	van Dijk (SUR); W 8–7	Gutiérrez (MEX); L 2–5	—N/a	Precioso (BRA); W 6–3	Did not advance	3rd place, bronze medalist(s)
Elvis Barbosa	Men's -80kg	Robles (CHI); L 1–2	did not advance					
Victoria Stambaugh	Women's -49kg	Pimentel (ARU); W 13–6	Zamora (GUA); L 3–4	did not advance				
Brieanna Hernandez	Women's -67kg	Vasconcelos (BRA); L 5–12	did not advance					
Crystal Weekes	Women's +67kg	Bye	Bravo (COL); L 3–11	did not advance				

== Tennis ==
Puerto Rico qualified one female tennis player.

Women

Athlete	Event	Round of 32	Round of 16	Quarterfinals	Semifinals	Final / BM	
Athlete	Event	Opposition Score	Opposition Score	Opposition Score	Opposition Score	Opposition Score	Rank
Monica Puig	Singles	Bye	Abanda (CAN); W 6–0, 6–3	Gámiz (VEN); W 6–0, 6–1	Rodríguez (MEX); L 6–2, 3–6, 2–6	Davis (USA); W 2–6, 6–3, 6–3	3rd place, bronze medalist(s)

== Volleyball ==
Puerto Rico qualified a men's and women's volleyball team, for a total of 24 athletes (12 men and 12 women).

=== Men's tournament ===
Pos	Team	Pld	W	L	Pts	SPW	SPL	SPR	SW	SL	SR
1	Canada	3	3	0	12	280	249	1.124	9	3	3.000
2	Puerto Rico	3	2	1	10	268	248	1.081	7	4	1.750
3	United States	3	1	2	7	295	294	1.003	6	7	0.857
4	Mexico	3	0	3	1	195	247	0.789	1	9	0.111

Source: Archived 2016-03-04 at the Wayback Machine

17 July 2015; 15:30	United States	1–3	Puerto Rico	Exhibition Centre, Toronto; Attendance: 1,700
17 July 2015; 15:30	(23–25, 26–24, 20–25, 26–28) result statistics			Exhibition Centre, Toronto; Attendance: 1,700

19 July 2015; 16:46	Canada	3–1	Puerto Rico	Exhibition Centre, Toronto; Attendance: 4,500
19 July 2015; 16:46	(25–23, 25–23, 21–25, 25–20) result statistics			Exhibition Centre, Toronto; Attendance: 4,500

21 July 2015; 15:47	Mexico	0–3	Puerto Rico	Exhibition Centre, Toronto; Attendance: 600
21 July 2015; 15:47	(23–25, 14–25, 20–25) result statistics			Exhibition Centre, Toronto; Attendance: 600

Quarterfinals

22 July 2015; 21:12	Puerto Rico	3–2	Cuba	Exhibition Centre, Toronto; Attendance: 3,100
22 July 2015; 21:12	(20–25, 22–25, 25–21, 25–20, 15–11) result statistics			Exhibition Centre, Toronto; Attendance: 3,100

Semifinals

24 July 2015; 21:53	Brazil	3–0	Puerto Rico	Exhibition Centre, Toronto; Attendance: 3,000
24 July 2015; 21:53	(25–16, 25–17, 25–23) result statistics			Exhibition Centre, Toronto; Attendance: 3,000

Bronze medal match

26 July 2015; 11:05	(bronze) Canada	3–1	Puerto Rico	Exhibition Centre, Toronto; Attendance: 4,900
26 July 2015; 11:05	(25–11, 25–12, 23–25, 25–18) result statistics			Exhibition Centre, Toronto; Attendance: 4,900

2015 Pan American Games 4th place

Puerto Rico

=== Women's tournament ===
- Debora Seilhamer #1
- Vilmarie Mojica #3
- Yarimar Rosa #6
- Stephanie Enright #7
- Aurea Cruz #9
- Shirley Ferrer #13
- Karina Ocasio #11
- Natalia Valentin #14
- Alexandra Oquendo #16
- Sheila Ocasio #17 /21
- Lynda Morales #18
- Nayka Benítez #13

Pos	Team	Pld	W	L	Pts	SPW	SPL	SPR	SW	SL	SR
1	Brazil	3	3	0	10	320	273	1.172	9	5	1.800
2	United States	3	2	1	12	254	200	1.270	8	3	2.667
3	Puerto Rico	3	1	2	7	232	247	0.939	5	6	0.833
4	Peru	3	0	3	1	164	250	0.656	1	9	0.111

Source: Archived 2015-10-20 at the Wayback Machine

Date		Score		Set 1	Set 2	Set 3	Set 4	Set 5	Total	Report
Jul 16	Brazil	3–2	Puerto Rico	23–25	28–26	25–17	24–26	15–10	115–104	P2P3
Jul 18	United States	3–0	Puerto Rico	25–17	25–22	25–14			75–53	P2P3
Jul 20	Puerto Rico	3–0	Peru	25–18	25–16	25–23			75–57	P2P3

Quarterfinals

Date		Score		Set 1	Set 2	Set 3	Set 4	Set 5	Total	Report
Jul 22	Argentina	2–3	Puerto Rico	21–25	27–25	10–25	25–11	13–15	96–101	P2 P3

Semifinals

Date		Score		Set 1	Set 2	Set 3	Set 4	Set 5	Total	Report
Jul 23	Brazil	3–2	Puerto Rico	18–25	24–26	25–22	25–19	15–11	107–103	P2 P3

2015 Pan American Games 4th place

Puerto Rico

== Water polo ==
Puerto Rico qualified a women's team. The team consists of 13 athletes. The men's team also qualified, but the country did not compete and was replaced by Ecuador for unknown reasons.

=== Women's tournament ===
Roster

The following was the Puerto Rico women's water polo team for the 2015 Pan American Games.

- Angelik Alicea
- Nichole Colon
- Guarina Garcia
- Maria Gutierrez
- Carolin Matos
- Paola Medina
- Alejandra Ortiz
- Amanda Ortiz
- Cristina Ortiz
- Osmarie Quinones
- Anaid Ralat
- Perla Del Mar Roman
- Mairim Rosario

Group B

Team	Pld	W	D	L	GF	GA	GD	Pts	Qualification
Canada	3	2	1	0	41	16	+25	5	Qualified for the semifinals
Brazil	3	2	1	0	42	18	+24	5	Qualified for the semifinals
Venezuela	3	0	1	2	16	44	−28	1	
Puerto Rico	3	0	1	2	26	47	−21	1	

7 July 2015; 08:08	Report	Venezuela	11–11	Puerto Rico	Markham Pan Am Centre; Referees: Humberto Navarro (USA), Guillermo Grgicevic (ARG)
7 July 2015; 08:08	Report	Score by quarters: 3–2, 5–3, 1–5, 2–1			Markham Pan Am Centre; Referees: Humberto Navarro (USA), Guillermo Grgicevic (ARG)
7 July 2015; 08:08	Report	Herrera 3	Goals	Montero 4	Markham Pan Am Centre; Referees: Humberto Navarro (USA), Guillermo Grgicevic (ARG)

9 July 2015; 12:08	Report	Canada	19–5	Puerto Rico	Markham Pan Am Centre; Referees: Diego Garibaldi (ARG), Claudia Aguilar (MEX)
9 July 2015; 12:08	Report	Score by quarters: 4–1, 4–2, 5–0, 6–2			Markham Pan Am Centre; Referees: Diego Garibaldi (ARG), Claudia Aguilar (MEX)
9 July 2015; 12:08	Report	Robinson 4	Goals	Delgado 2	Markham Pan Am Centre; Referees: Diego Garibaldi (ARG), Claudia Aguilar (MEX)

11 July 2015; 12:08	Report	Brazil	17–10	Puerto Rico	Markham Pan Am Centre; Referees: Jaume Teixido (SPA), Mark Maretzki (USA).
11 July 2015; 12:08	Report	Score by quarters: 4-2, 3-5, 5-1, 5-2			Markham Pan Am Centre; Referees: Jaume Teixido (SPA), Mark Maretzki (USA).
11 July 2015; 12:08	Report	Badocco 4	Goals	Montero 3	Markham Pan Am Centre; Referees: Jaume Teixido (SPA), Mark Maretzki (USA).

Fifth to Eighth place playoffs

12 July 2015; 12:00	Report	Argentina	6–14	Puerto Rico	Markham Pan Am Centre; Referees: Joao Cardenuto (BRA), Humberto Navarro (USA)
12 July 2015; 12:00	Report	Score by quarters: 1-3, 2-4, 0-3, 3-4			Markham Pan Am Centre; Referees: Joao Cardenuto (BRA), Humberto Navarro (USA)
12 July 2015; 12:00	Report	Font 3, Comba 2, Hatcher 1	Goals	Medina 5	Markham Pan Am Centre; Referees: Joao Cardenuto (BRA), Humberto Navarro (USA)

Fifth place match

14 July 2015; 14:00	Report	Puerto Rico	12–11	Mexico	Markham Pan Am Centre; Referees: Juan Menendez (CUB), Diego Garibaldi (ARG)
14 July 2015; 14:00	Report	Score by quarters: 2–3, 4–3, 4–1, 2–4			Markham Pan Am Centre; Referees: Juan Menendez (CUB), Diego Garibaldi (ARG)
14 July 2015; 14:00	Report	Nazario 4	Goals	Castro 4	Markham Pan Am Centre; Referees: Juan Menendez (CUB), Diego Garibaldi (ARG)

== Weightlifting ==
Puerto Rico qualified a team of 4 athletes (2 men and 2 women). However, only the two women ended up competing.

Women

Athlete	Event	Snatch		Clean & Jerk		Total	Rank
Athlete	Event	Result	Rank	Result	Rank	Total	Rank
Lely Burgos	48 kg	71	5	91	7	162	6
Cecilly Morales Melendez	69 kg	85	10	112	7	197	9

== See also ==
- Puerto Rico at the 2016 Summer Olympics
