= Karavayev =

Karavayev or Karavaev (Russian: Караваев) is a Russian masculine surname, with the feminine counterpart being Karavayeva or Karavaeva. It may refer to:

- Dmitry Kuzmin-Karavayev (1886–1959), Russian revolutionary
- Irina Karavayeva (born 1975), Russian trampolinist
- Oleksandr Karavayev (born 1992), Ukrainian football midfielder
- Oleg Karavayev (1936–1978), Soviet wrestler
- Valeriya Karavayeva (born 1993), Kazakhstani handball player
- Vladimir Kuzmin-Karavayev (1859–1928), Russian legal scholar and politician, father or Dmitry
- Vyacheslav Karavayev (born 1995), Russian football player
