= Prijović =

Prijović (Serbian Cyrillic: Пpиjoвић, pronounced [prǐːjoʋitɕ]) is a Serbian surname. Notable people with the surname include:

- Aleksandar Prijović (born 1990), Serbian footballer
- Aleksandra Prijović (born 1995), Serbian singer
- Ivana Prijović (born 1992), Serbian handball player
