= Fabiola Martínez =

Fabiola Martínez may refer to:

- Fabiola Martínez (handballer)
- Fabiola Martínez (footballer)
