= Luhaka =

Luhaka is the surname of the following people:

- Aurelie Luhaka, a Congolese team handball player
- Cristopher Luhaka, a defender in the 2018 season for German football club FSV 63 Luckenwalde
- Jean-Christophe Luhaka, a co-author of V. Y. Mudimbe who has written multiple books
- Théodore Luhaka, a local educator who was involved in the 2017 French riots
- Thomas Luhaka, a politician from the Democratic Republic of Congo
