= Boxing at the 2015 Pan American Games – Women's flyweight =

Women's flyweight at the 2015 Pan American Games
- Venue: Oshawa Sports Centre
- Dates: July 20–25
- Competitors: 8 from 8 nations

Medalists
Gold medal	Mandy Bujold	Canada
Silver medal	Marlen Esparza	United States
Bronze medal	Monica Gonzalez Rivera	Puerto Rico
Bronze medal	Ingrit Valencia	Colombia

The women's flyweight competition of the boxing events at the 2015 Pan American Games in Toronto, Ontario, Canada, was held between the 20 and 25 of July at the Oshawa Sports Centre. The defending champion is Mandy Bujold of Canada. Flyweights is limited to those boxers weighing less than or equal to 51 kilograms.

Like all Pan American boxing events, the competition is a straight single-elimination tournament. Both semifinal losers are awarded bronze medals, so no boxers compete again after their first loss. Bouts consist of a 3 rounds "10-point must" scoring system used in the pro game, where the winner of each round must be awarded 10 points and the loser a lesser amount. AIBA officials are waiting to see how things go in the men's game before making a decision to take headgear off women fighters. Five judges scored each bout. The winner will be the boxer who scored the most at the end of the match.

== Qualification ==
A total of eight boxers qualified to compete.

== Results ==
=== Bracket ===
Quarterfinals; July 20, 2015
Marlen Esparza (USA)	3
Claudia Parrales Guevara (NCA)	0
Monica Gonzalez Rivera (PUR)	2
Tayonis Cedeno (VEN)	0
Nadia Barriga Villarroel (BOL)	0
Ingrit Valencia (COL)	3
Lucy Valdivia (PER)	0
Mandy Bujold (CAN)	3

Semifinals; July 21, 2015
Marlen Esparza (USA)	3
Monica Gonzalez Rivera (PUR)	0
Ingrit Valencia (COL)	0
Mandy Bujold (CAN)	2

Finals; July 25, 2015
Marlen Esparza (USA)	1
Mandy Bujold (CAN)	2
