= Anne Mette Pedersen =

Danish handball player (born 1992)

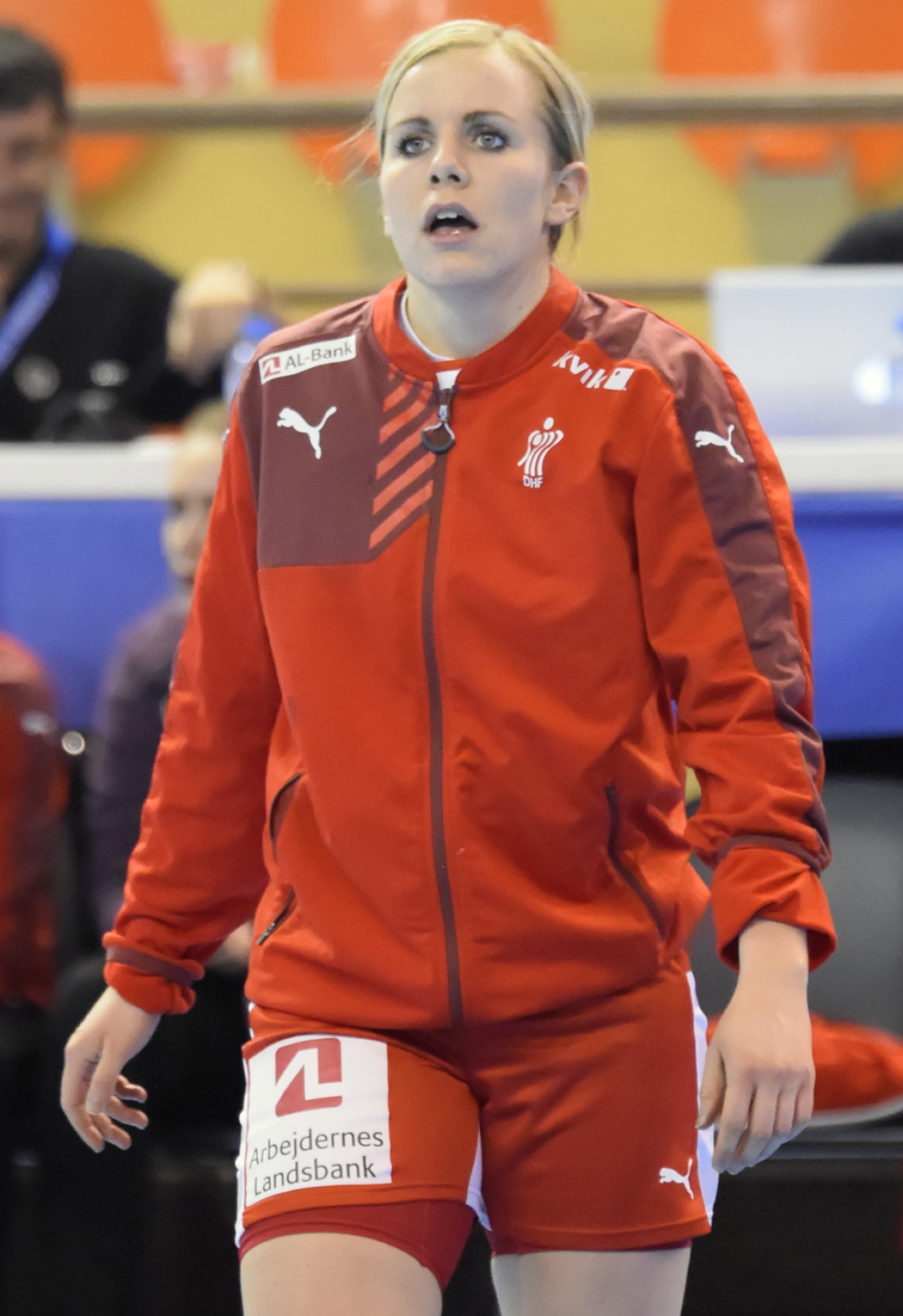

Personal information
- Nationality: Danish
- Born: 25 October 1992 (age 33) Galten, Denmark
- Height: 1.75 m (5 ft 9 in)

Sport
- Sport: Handball
- Position: Right wing
- Current club: Retired
- Number: 23

Youth career
- Years: Team
- –: Galten Brabrand
- –: Team Ikast

Senior clubs
- Years: Team
- 2009-2012: FCM Håndbold
- 2012-2013: Ringkøbing Håndbold
- 2013-2017: København Håndbold
- 2017-2019: FCM Håndbold
- 2019-2020: Odense Håndbold
National team
Years	Team	Apps	(Gls)
2011-2016	Denmark	27	(29)
Medal record
European Junior Championship
Gold medal – first place	2011 Netherlands
European Youth Championship
Gold medal – first place	2009 Serbia

Anne Mette Pedersen (born 25 October 1992) is a Danish retired handball player, who last played for Odense Håndbold and the formerly Danish national team.

She participated at the 2015 World Women's Handball Championship.
