= Boutheïna Amiche =

Tunisian handball player

Personal information
- Nationality: Tunisian
- Born: 12 September 1990 (age 36) Téboulba, Tunesia
- Height: 1.72 m (5 ft 8 in)

Sport
- Sport: Handball
- Position: Left wing
- Current club: ASF Sfax
National team
Years	Team	Apps	(Gls)
–	Tunisia	20	(26)
Medal record
African Championship
Bronze medal – third place	2021 Yaoundé

Boutheïna Amiche (born 12 September 1990) is a Tunisian handball player for ASF Sfax and the Tunisian national team.

She participated at the 2015 and 2017 World Women's Handball Championship.
