= Patricia Mayoulou =

Congolese handball player

Personal information
- Nationality: Congolese
- Born: 31 July 1981 (age 45)
- Height: 1.77 m (5 ft 10 in)

Sport
- Sport: Handball
- Position: Left wing
National team
- Years: Team
- –: DR Congo

Patricia Mayoulou (born 31 July 1981) is a Congolese handball player. She is member of the DR Congo national team, and competed at the 2015 World Women's Handball Championship in Denmark.
