= Caridad Vizcay =

Cuban handball player (born 1978)

Personal information
- Nationality: Cuban
- Born: 21 February 1978 (age 48)
- Height: 1.80 m (5 ft 11 in)

Sport
- Sport: Handball
- Position: Goalkeeper
- Current club: Santiago de Cuba
National team
Years	Team	Apps	(Gls)
–	Cuba	112	(0)

Caridad Vizcay (born 21 February 1978) is a Cuban handball player for Santiago de Cuba and the Cuban national team.

She participated at the 2015 World Women's Handball Championship.
