= Diane Louoba =

Congolese handball player (born 1983)

Personal information
- Nationality: Congolese
- Born: 16 April 1983 (age 43)
- Height: 1.63 m (5 ft 4 in)

Sport
- Sport: Handball
- Position: Goalkeeper
- Current club: Blavozy RB
National team
- Years: Team
- –: DR Congo

Diane Louoba (born 16 April 1983) is a Congolese handball player. She plays for the club Blavozy RB and is member of the DR Congo national team. She competed at the 2015 World Women's Handball Championship in Denmark.
