= Song Jialei =

Chinese handball player (born 1995)

Personal information
- Nationality: Chinese
- Born: 25 January 1995 (age 31)
- Height: 1.88 m (6 ft 2 in)

Sport
- Sport: Handball
- Position: Goalkeeper
- Current club: Beijing Handball
National team
Years	Team	Apps	(Gls)
–	China	0	(0)

Song Jialei (born 25 January 1995) is a Chinese handball player who plays for the club Beijing Handball. She is member of the Chinese national team. She competed at the 2015 World Women's Handball Championship in Denmark.
