= Paola Morel =

Puerto Rican handball player

Personal information
- Nationality: Puerto Rican
- Born: 29 October 1996 (age 29)
- Height: 1.76 m (5 ft 9 in)

Sport
- Sport: Handball
- Position: Left back
- Current club: Rio Grande Handball
National team
Years	Team	Apps	(Gls)
–	Puerto Rico	0	(0)

Paola Morel (born 29 October 1996) is a Puerto Rican handball player who plays for the club Rio Grande Handball. She is member of the Puerto Rican national team. She competed at the 2015 World Women's Handball Championship in Denmark.
