= Monica Gonzalez (boxer) =

Puerto Rican boxer (born 1988)

Mónica González
Personal information
- Full name: Mónica González Rivera
- Born: September 29, 1988 (age 37)

Sport
- Sport: Boxing
- Weight class: Flyweight
Medal record
Women's amateur boxing
Representing Puerto Rico
Pan American Games
Bronze medal – third place	2015 Toronto	Flyweight

Mónica González Rivera (born September 29, 1988) is a Puerto Rican amateur female boxer from the city of Arroyo. She won a bronze medal as a flyweight for Puerto Rico at the 2015 Pan American Games held in Toronto, Ontario, Canada. A member of the Puerto Rican national women's boxing team, Gonzalez had taken up boxing only a year and a half before the Toronto Pan American Games.

== Arrest ==
On April 14, 2018, Guayama police announced that they had arrested González, charged with attacking and hurting two people with a baseball bat, in an event that allegedly took place on April 11.
