= Iporã =

Municipality of Paraná, Brazil

Coordinates: 24°00′10″S 53°42′14″W

- Municipality
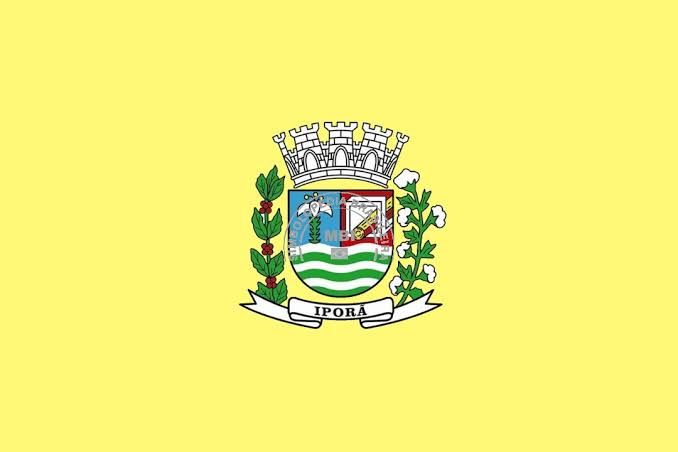
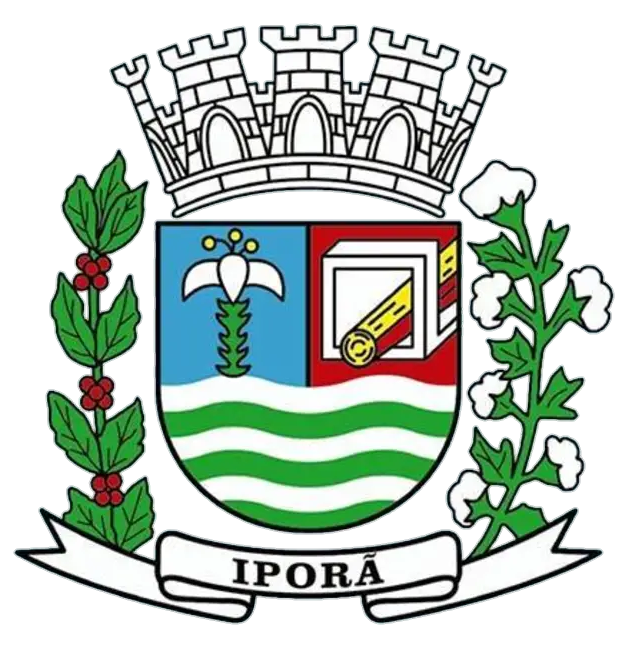
- Flag Coat of arms
- Interactive map of Iporã
- Country: Brazil
- Time zone: UTC−3 (BRT)

Iporã is a municipality in the northwest of the state of Paraná, approximately sixty kilometers from the border with Paraguay. Its population in 2020 was estimated to be 13,782.
