= Nina Kolundžić =

Serbian handball player (born 1990)

Personal information
- Nationality: Serbian
- Born: 29 January 1990 (age 36)
- Height: 1.86 m (6 ft 1 in)

Sport
- Sport: Handball
- Position: Goalkeeper
- Current club: TSG Haßloch
- Number: 1
National team
Years	Team	Apps	(Gls)
–	Serbia	15	(0)
Medal record
Summer Universiade
Bronze medal – third place	2015 Gwangju	Team

Nina Kolundžić (born 29 January 1990) is a Serbian handball player for TSG Haßloch and the Serbian national team.

She participated at the 2015 World Women's Handball Championship.
