= Amanda de Andrade =

Brazilian handball player (born 1989)

Personal information
- Full name: Amanda Claudino de Andrade
- Born: 20 December 1989 (age 36) Iporã, Brazil
- Height: 1.74 m (5 ft 9 in)

Sport
- Sport: Handball
- Position: Left back
- Current club: UnC/Concórdia
National team
Years	Team	Apps	(Gls)
–	Brazil	51	(89)
Medal record
World Championship
Gold medal – first place	2013 Serbia
Pan American Games
Gold medal – first place	2015 Toronto	Team
Pan American Championship
Gold medal – first place	2015 Cuba

Amanda Claudino de Andrade (born 20 December 1989) is a Brazilian handball player. She plays for the club UnC/Concórdia and on the Brazilian national team. She represented Brazil at the 2013 World Women's Handball Championship in Serbia, where Brazil won their first ever World Championship.

== Achievements ==
- World Championship:
  - Winner: 2013
- Pan American Championship:
  - Winner: 2015
