= Mehrez Ben Ammar =

Tunisian handball coach

Mehrez Jamhouri Ben Ammar is a Tunisian handball coach, who previously coached the Tunisian national team.

He coached them at the 2015 World Women's Handball Championship.

Later he was the assistant coach on the Tunisian youth national team.
