= Sheila Salas =

Cuban handball player (born 1993)

Personal information
- Nationality: Cuban
- Born: 28 January 1993 (age 33)
- Height: 1.75 m (5 ft 9 in)

Sport
- Sport: Handball
- Position: Centre back
- Current club: Matanzas
National team
Years	Team	Apps	(Gls)
–	Cuba	5	(4)

Sheila Salas (born 28 January 1993) is a Cuban handball player. She plays for the club Matanzas and is member of the Cuban national team. She competed at the 2015 World Women's Handball Championship in Denmark.
