= Ivana Prijović =

Serbian handball player (born 1992)

Personal information
- Nationality: Serbian
- Born: 4 February 1992 (age 34) Šabac, Serbia
- Height: 1.76 m (5 ft 9 in)

Sport
- Sport: Handball
- Position: Centre back
- Current club: Al-Ittihad
National team
Years	Team	Apps	(Gls)
–	Serbia	4	(0)
Medal record
Summer Universiade
Bronze medal – third place	2015 Gwangju	Team

Ivana Prijović (born 4 February 1992) is a Serbian handball player who plays for the club Ardeşen GSK. She is member of the Serbian national team. She competed at the 2015 World Women's Handball Championship in Denmark.
