= Milena Mesa =

Cuban handball player (born 1993)

Personal information
- Nationality: Cuban
- Born: 26 June 1993 (age 33)
- Height: 1.67 m (5 ft 6 in)

Sport
- Sport: Handball
- Position: Right back
- Current club: Holguín
National team
Years	Team	Apps	(Gls)
–	Cuba	29	(40)
Medal record
Pan American Championship
Silver medal – second place	2015 Cuba

Milena Mesa Matos (born 26 June 1993) is a Cuban handball player. She plays on the Cuba women's national handball team and participated at the 2011 World Women's Handball Championship in Brazil.
