= Aurelie Luhaka =

Congolese handball player

Personal information
- Nationality: Congolese
- Born: 19 April 1992 (age 34)
- Height: 1.90 m (6 ft 3 in)

Sport
- Sport: Handball
- Position: Left back
- Current club: HB Octeville

Senior clubs
- Years: Team
- -2015: HB Octeville
- 2015-2016: Le Havre AC
National team
- Years: Team
- 2015-: DR Congo

Aurelie Luhaka (born 19 April 1992) is a Congolese team handball player. She plays for the club HB Octeville and is member of the DR Congo national team. She competed at the 2015 World Women's Handball Championship in Denmark.
