= Antonella Gambino =

Argentine handball player

Personal information
- Nationality: Argentine
- Born: 26 March 1990 (age 36)
- Height: 1.64 m (5 ft 5 in)

Sport
- Sport: Handball
- Position: Right back
- Current club: Argentinos Juniors
National team
Years	Team	Apps	(Gls)
–	Argentina	62	(161)
Medal record
Pan American Games
Silver medal – second place	2015 Toronto	Team
Pan American Championship
Bronze medal – third place	2015 Cuba

Antonella Gambino (born 26 March 1990) is an Argentine handball player. She plays for the club Argentinos Juniors and on the Argentina women's national handball team. She defended Argentina at the 2013 World Women's Handball Championship in Serbia, and the 2015 Pan American Games in Toronto (Canada), where Argentina won its inaugural qualification to the 2016 Rio Summer Olympics.
