= Eduardo Peruchena =

Argentinian handball coach and player

Eduardo Peruchena (born 29 October 1964 in Buenos Aires, Argentina) is an Argentine handball coach and a former handball player. He was coach of the Argentina women's national handball team from 2012 to 2018.

After growing up in Lujan, Buenos Aires, Argentina, he developed a career related to handball. He played for 10 years in his hometown team and coached some other small teams, while as a day job he teaches physical education for Colegio Tarbut. He was the first coach to reach an Olympic stage with the female national team in the year 2016. Many experts said that his accomplishments and progress has been unique for Argentina's sports.

In the year 2012 a survey was posted on an internet page, after several days of voting between 4 candidates running up for coach, Peruchena got on top and weeks later he was announced as the manager of the Female team.

He was replaced by Eduardo Gallardo. Prior to being the head coach, he was the assistant coach on the Argentine national team under Daniel Zeballos.

== Accomplishments ==
- Pan American Championship 2017, 2nd place.
- Río de Janeiro 2016, 12th place (first Olympic participation).
- Pan American Championship Toronto 2015, subcampeón.
- Pan American Championship Cuba 2015, third place.
- World Championship 2015, 18th place.
- World Championship 2013, 19th place.
