= Valeriya Karavayeva =

Kazakhstani handball player

Personal information
- Nationality: Kazakhstani
- Born: 3 August 1993 (age 33)
- Height: 1.65 m (5 ft 5 in)

Sport
- Sport: Handball
- Position: Left wing
- Current club: Almaty Handball
National team
Years	Team	Apps	(Gls)
–	Kazakhstan	4	(12)

Valeriya Karavayeva (born 3 August 1993) is a Kazakhstani handball player who plays for the club Almaty Handball. She is a member of the Kazakhstani national team. She competed at the 2015 World Women's Handball Championship in Denmark.
