= Ismary Barrio =

Cuban handball player (born 1981)

Personal information
- Nationality: Cuban
- Born: 19 August 1981 (age 45)
- Height: 1.79 m (5 ft 10 in)

Sport
- Sport: Handball
- Position: Pivot
- Current club: Pinar del Río
National team
Years	Team	Apps	(Gls)
–	Cuba	29	(22)
Medal record
Pan American Championship
Silver medal – second place	2015 Cuba

Ismary Barrio (born 19 August 1981) is a Cuban handball player. She plays for the club Pinar del Río and is member of the Cuban national team. She competed at the 2015 World Women's Handball Championship in Denmark.
