= Natalie Cabello =

Puerto Rican handball player

Personal information
- Nationality: Puerto Rican
- Born: 3 November 1990 (age 35)
- Height: 1.63 m (5 ft 4 in)

Sport
- Sport: Handball
- Position: Pivot
- Current club: Guaynabo Handball
National team
Years	Team	Apps	(Gls)
–	Puerto Rico	12	(16)
Medal record
Women's handball
Representing Puerto Rico
Central American and Caribbean Games
Silver medal – second place	2018 Barranquilla	Team

Natalie Cabello (born 3 November 1990) is a Puerto Rican handball player who plays for the club Guaynabo Handball. She is member of the Puerto Rican national team. She competed at the 2015 World Women's Handball Championship in Denmark.
