= Jereny Espinal =

Puerto Rican handball player

Personal information
- Nationality: Puerto Rican
- Born: 3 October 1997 (age 29)
- Height: 1.81 m (5 ft 11 in)

Sport
- Sport: Handball
- Position: Right back
- Current club: Santa Isabel Handball
National team
Years	Team	Apps	(Gls)
–	Puerto Rico	5	(1)
Medal record
Women's handball
Representing Puerto Rico
Nor.Ca. Championship
Gold medal – first place	2017 Puerto Rico

Jereny Espinal (born 3 October 1997) is a Puerto Rican handball player who plays for the club Santa Isabel Handball. She is member of the Puerto Rican national team. She competed at the 2015 World Women's Handball Championship in Denmark.
