= Fabiola Martínez (handballer) =

Puerto Rican handball player

Personal information
- Nationality: Puerto Rican
- Born: 30 May 1995 (age 31)
- Height: 1.73 m (5 ft 8 in)

Sport
- Sport: Handball
- Position: Left wing
- Current club: Santa Isabel Handball
National team
Years	Team	Apps	(Gls)
–	Puerto Rico	12	(11)

Fabiola Martínez (born 30 May 1995) is a Puerto Rican handball player who plays for the club Santa Isabel Handball. She is member of the Puerto Rican national team. She competed at the 2015 World Women's Handball Championship in Denmark.
