= Tori-Ellis Willetts =

English boxer (born 1995)

Personal information
- Nickname: The Tornado
- Born: 25 May 1995 (age 31) Nuneaton, Warwickshire, England
- Weight: Super-bantamweight

Boxing career
- Stance: Orthodox

Boxing record
- Total fights: 9
- Wins: 7
- Win by KO: 1
- Losses: 2

Tori-Ellis Willetts (born 25 May 1995) is an English professional boxer. As an amateur, she was a two-time elite national champion, GB Tri-Nation champion and represented her country internationally.

== Amateur career ==
Willetts won the England Boxing National Amateur Championships female elite under 51 kg title in 2018 and 2019 defeating Stevie Pitts and Chloe Watson respectively in the finals. Representing England, she won the 2018 GB Elite Three Nations defeating Helen Jones from Wales in the final.

In 2019, Willetts was selected to compete at the World Championships in Russia where she lost by unanimous decision to Gabriela Dimitrova in the round of 32.

== Professional career ==
Willetts made her professional debut on 5 May 2023, stopping Klaudia Ferenczi in the third-round at the Magna Centre in Rotherham on the undercard of the Jay Harris vs Tommy Frank bill which was shown live on the BBC iPlayer.

Unbeaten in her first five pro-fights, she challenged British and Commonwealth female super-bantamweight champion Tysie Gallagher at Canon Medical Arena in Sheffield on 27 September 2024 with the vacant WBO International female super-bantamweight title also on the line, but lost by unanimous decision.

Willetts fought future world champion Melissa Mortensen at Sydbank Arena in Kolding, Denmark, on 31 January 2026, losing the eight-round contest via unanimous decision.

== Personal life ==
Willetts served in the British Army before switching to becoming a reservist while also working as a PE Teacher.

== Professional boxing record ==
9 fights	7 wins	2 losses
By knockout	1	0
By decision	6	2

No.	Result	Record	Opponent	Type	Round, time	Date	Location	Notes
9	Loss	7–2	Melissa Mortensen	UD	8	31 Jan 2026	Sydbank Arena, Kolding, Denmark	
8	Win	7–1	Gemma Ruegg	PTS	8	5 Oct 2025	Holiday Inn, Birmingham Airport, England	
7	Win	6–1	Beccy Ferguson	PTS	6	14 Feb 2025	Holiday Inn, Birmingham Airport, England	
6	Loss	5–1	Tysie Gallagher	UD	10	27 Sep 2024	Canon Medical Arena, Sheffield, England	For British and Commonwealth female super-bantamweight titles and vacant WBO International female super-bantamweight title
5	Win	5–0	Kerry Orton	PTS	4	29 Jun 2024	Skydome, Coventry, England	
4	Win	4–0	Liubov Oksha	PTS	6	10 May 2024	H Suite, Edgbaston, Birmingham, England	
3	Win	3–0	Ivanka Ivanova	PTS	6	20 Oct 2023	Holiday Inn, Birmingham, England	
2	Win	2–0	Wendellin Cruz	PTS	6	30 Jul 2023	The Eastside Rooms, Birmingham, England	
1	Win	1–0	Klaudia Ferenczi	TKO	3 (6), 1:58	5 May 2023	Magna Centre, Rotherham, England	
