= Jasmina Zapotoczna =

Polish boxer (born 1994)

Personal information
- Born: 19 April 1994 (age 32) Wrocław, Poland
- Weight: Flyweight, Super-flyweight

Boxing career
- Stance: Orthodox

Boxing record
- Total fights: 12
- Wins: 10
- Win by KO: 0
- Losses: 2

Jasmina Zapotoczna (born 19 April 1994) is a Polish professional boxer. She challenged for the undisputed female flyweight world title in 2026. Zapotoczna is also a former European female flyweight champion.

== Biography ==
Zapotoczna moved from Poland to England for work reasons in December 2018 and settled in Wakefield, Yorkshire.

Unbeaten in her first six fights as a professional, she was brought in at short notice to face Shannon Ryan for the vacant WBA female super-flyweight International title at Indigo at The O2 in London on 10 February 2024, losing by unanimous decision.

Dropping down a weight division, Zapotoczna took on the previously undefeated Maisey Rose Courtney at the Copper Box Arena in London on 6 July 2024, with the vacant WBA female flyweight International championship on the line. She won via unanimous decision to claim her first professional title.

She was due to challenge European female flyweight champion Chloe Watson in September 2024, but the bout was postponed when her opponent suffered an injury. The contest was rescheduled to take place on an all-female card, headlined by a welterweight world title unification fight between Natasha Jonas and Lauren Price, at the Royal Albert Hall in London on 7 March 2025. Zapotoczna won by split decision with two of the ringside judges scoring the contest 96–95 in her favour, while the third had it 97–93 for Watson.

Zapotoczna made the first defense of her title against Justine Lallemand at Salle Bayard in Charleville-Mézières, France, on 15 November 2025. She won via majority decision.

After more than a year away from the competitive boxing ring, Zapotoczna challenged undisputed female flyweight world champion Gabriela Fundora at Fantasy Springs Resort Casino in Indio, California, United States, on 20 November 2026. She was sent to the canvas by punches to her body in the seventh and eighth rounds, eventually losing by unanimous decision.

== Professional boxing record ==
12 fights	10 wins	2 losses
By decision	10	2

No.	Result	Record	Opponent	Type	Round, time	Date	Location	Notes
12	Loss	10–2	Gabriela Fundora	UD	10	20 Nov 2026	Fantasy Springs Resort Casino, Indio, California, U.S.	For WBA, WBC, IBF, WBO and The Ring female flyweight titles
11	Win	10–1	Justine Lallemand	MD	10	15 Nov 2025	Salle Bayard, Charleville-Mézières, France	Retained European female flyweight title
10	Win	9–1	Chloe Watson	SD	10	7 Mar 2025	Royal Albert Hall, London, England	Won European female flyweight title
9	Win	8–1	Maisey Rose Courtney	UD	10	6 Jul 2024	Copper Box Arena, London, England	Won vacant WBA female flyweight International title
8	Win	7–1	Gemma Ruegg	PTS	8	8 Jun 2024	Oldham Leisure Centre, Oldham, England	
7	Loss	6–1	Shannon Ryan	UD	10	10 Feb 2024	Indigo at The O2, London, England	For vacant WBA female super-flyweight International title
6	Win	6–0	Gemma Ruegg	PTS	8	18 Dec 2023	O2 Academy, Bournemouth, England	
5	Win	5–0	Kira Carter	PTS	6	14 Oct 2023	Oldham Leisure Centre, Oldham, England	
4	Win	4–0	Inna Statkevych	PTS	6	15 Jul 2023	Oldham Leisure Centre, Oldham, England	
3	Win	3–0	Svitlana Vasylevska	PTS	6	18 Mar 2023	Robin Park Centre, Wigan, England	
2	Win	2–0	Jamillette Janitza Vallejos	PTS	4	22 Oct 2022	Oldham Leisure Centre, Oldham, England	
1	Win	1–0	Klaudia Ferenczi	PTS	4	23 Jul 2022	Oldham Leisure Centre, Oldham, England	
