= Melissa Mortensen =

Danish boxer (born 2001)

Personal information
- Nationality: Danish
- Born: 3 November 2001 (age 25) Varde, Denmark
- Height: 1.63 m (5 ft 4 in)
- Weight: Super bantamweight

Boxing career
- Stance: Orthodox

Boxing record
- Total fights: 10
- Wins: 10
- Win by KO: 5

Melissa Juvonen Mortensen (born 3 November 2001) is a Danish professional boxer. She has held the WBA female super-bantamweight title since August 2026.

== Amateur career ==
Mortensen competed in the women's featherweight event of the 2023 European Games, where she reached the quarterfinals. In January 2024, she won the World Boxing Cup: GB Open in the women's 54A kg event.

== Professional career ==
Mortensen made her professional debut and faced Naiara Olmedo at the Struer Arena on 25 June 2021. After six rounds, she won the bout by unanimous decision.

Mortensen faced Dorota Norek for the EBU female silver super-bantamweight title at the Sportium in Varde, Denmark on 6 December 2025. After four rounds, she won the title by technical knockout.

Mortensen faced Tori-Ellis Willetts for her first EBU female silver super-bantamweight title defense at the Sydbank Arena on 31 January 2026. After eight rounds, she defended her title by unanimous decision.

Mortensen faced Mayelli Flores for the vacant WBA female super-bantamweight title at the Pechanga Resort Casino on 21 August 2026. After ten rounds, she won the title by split decision with the scorecards reading 95–94, 95–94, 94–95. Following the fight, it was revealed that Flores had suffered a broken jaw in the fourth round.

== Professional boxing record ==
10 fights	10 wins	0 losses
By knockout	5	0
By decision	5	0

No.	Result	Record	Opponent	Type	Round, time	Date	Location	Notes
10	Win	10–0	Mayelli Flores	SD	10	21 Aug 2026	Pechanga Resort Casino, Temecula, California, U.S.	Won WBA female super-bantamweight title
9	Win	9–0	Tori-Ellis Willetts	UD	8	31 Jan 2026	Sydbank Arena, Kolding, Denmark	Defended the EBU female silver super-bantamweight title
8	Win	8–0	Dorota Norek	TKO	4 (10), 1:59	6 Dec 2025	Sportium, Varde, Denmark	Won EBU female silver super-bantamweight title
7	Win	7–0	Cristina Garganese	TKO	5 (8), 0:19	13 Sep 2025	Sydbank Arena, Kolding, Denmark	
6	Win	6–0	Halima Vunjabei	UD	8	14 Jun 2025	Crowne Plaza Hotel, Copenhagen, Denmark	
5	Win	5–0	Svitlana Vasylevska	TKO	8 (8), 0:43	12 Apr 2025	Fun Art, Pandrup, Denmark	
4	Win	4–0	Alba Sánchez	UD	6	1 March 2025	Vejen Idraetscenter, Vejen, Denmark	
3	Win	3–0	Gabriella Mezei	KO	1 (6), 1:22	23 Nov 2024	Forum Kolding, Kolding, Denmark	
2	Win	2–0	Nino Mgebrishvili	KO	2 (6), 0:19	25 Oct 2024	Graakjaer Arena, Holstebro, Denmark	
1	Win	1–0	Naiara Olmedo	UD	6	25 Jun 2021	Struer Arena, Struer, Denmark	
