= Shannon Ryan =

English boxer (born 1996)

Personal information
- Nickname: Kaos
- Born: 1 December 1996 (age 29) Watford, Hertfordshire, England
- Height: 158 cm (5 ft 2 in)
- Weight: Super-flyweight

Boxing career
- Stance: Orthodox

Boxing record
- Total fights: 13
- Wins: 12
- Win by KO: 3
- Losses: 1

Shannon Ryan (born 1 December 1996) is an English professional boxer. She has held the IBF female Intercontinental super-flyweight title since October 2025, the Commonwealth female super-flyweight title since May 2026 and the British female super-flyweight title since October 2026. Ryan is also a former WBA female International super-flyweight champion.

== Career ==
A former world-class kickboxer and member of the Team GB taekwondo squad, Ryan switched to boxing in 2016 and went on to have an amateur career which included winning the 2018 Alliance Boxing Champion and 2019 Women's Winter Box Cup before signing with former World heavyweight champion Anthony Joshua’s 258 management company and turning professional in 2022.

She made her pro-debut on 26 March 2022 at Wembley Arena in London, defeating Klaudia Ferenczi on points in a four-round contest. Her third fight was a points victory against Buchra El Quaissi on the historic all-female card topped by the Claressa Shields vs Savannah Marshall unified middleweight title showdown at The O2 Arena in London on 15 October 2022.

Ryan signed a promotional deal with Eddie Hearn's Matchroom Boxing in March 2023. She was scheduled to challenge Commonwealth female super-flyweight champion Emma Dolan for her title in a bout that would also have been for the inaugural British female super-flyweight crown on 10 February 2024, but the contest was called off after Dolan withdrew due to illness. Unbeaten Jasmina Zapotoczna stepped in to face Ryan at the Indigo Arena at the O2 in London with the WBA female super-flyweight International belt on the line. Ryan won via unanimous decision to claim her first professional title.

Ryan and Dolan's fight for the Commonwealth and British female super-flyweight titles eventually took place at Resorts World Arena in Birmingham on 22 June 2024. After being knocked to the canvas during round two, Ryan lost the bout, and her unbeaten professional record, by split decision. One ringside judge scored the fight 95–94 in her favour but was overruled by the other two who had it 96–94 and 96–93 respectively for Dolan.

Ryan faced Chloe Watson for the vacant IBF female Intercontinental super-flyweight title at York Hall in London on 17 October 2025. She won via unanimous technical decision after being ahead on all three judges' scorecards when the bout was stopped following the fourth round due to an eye injury suffered by Watson as a result of an accidental clash of heads.

In her next outing, Ryan defended her title against Nicola Hopewell at University of Wolverhampton at The Halls in Wolverhampton on 2 May 2026, with the vacant Commonwealth female super-flyweight title also on the line. She won the fight by stoppage in the second round when her opponent's corner threw in the towel after she had knocked Hopewell to the canvas.

In a rematch of their fight from June 2024, Ryan faced Emma Dolan at Utilita Arena in Sheffield on 24 October 2026 with her Commonwealth and IBF Intercontinental titles and her opponent's British championship on the line. She sent her opponent to the canvas twice in the first round with the referee waving the contest off after the second knockdown, awarding her the win by technical knockout.

== Professional boxing record ==
13 fights	12 wins	1 loss
By knockout	3	0
By decision	9	1

No.	Result	Record	Opponent	Type	Round, time	Date	Location	Notes
13	Win	12–1	Emma Dolan	TKO	1 (10), 0:46	24 Oct 2026	Utilita Arena, Sheffield, England	Retained Commonwealth and IBF female Intercontinental super-flyweight titles; Won British female super-flyweight title
12	Win	11–1	Nicola Hopewell	TKO	2 (10), 1:01	2 May 2026	University of Wolverhampton at The Halls, Wolverhampton, England	Retained IBF female Intercontinental super-flyweight title; Won vacant Commonwealth female super-flyweight title
11	Win	10–1	Chloe Watson	UTD	4 (10)	17 Oct 2025	York Hall, London, England	Won the vacant IBF female Intercontinental super-flyweight title
10	Win	9–1	Fara El Bousairi	PTS	8	17 May 2025	Copper Box Arena, London, England	
9	Win	8–1	Kate Radomska	TKO	3 (8), 1:10	13 Dec 2024	York Hall, London, England	
8	Loss	7–1	Emma Dolan	SD	10	22 Jun 2024	Resorts World Arena, Birmingham, England	For Commonwealth and inaugural British female super-flyweight titles
7	Win	7–0	Jasmina Zapotoczna	UD	10	10 Feb 2024	Indigo Arena at The O2, London, England	Won vacant WBA International female super-flyweight title
6	Win	6–0	Xenia Jorneac	PTS	8	30 Sep 2023	Wembley Arena, London, England	
5	Win	5–0	Martina Bernile	PTS	8	10 Jun 2023	Wembley Arena, London, England	
4	Win	4–0	Ivanka Ivanova	PTS	6	27 Nov 2022	Alexandra Palace, London, England	
3	Win	3–0	Buchra El Quaissi	PTS	4	15 Oct 2022	The O2 Arena, London, England	
2	Win	2–0	Gemma Ruegg	PTS	4	11 Jun 2022	Wembley Arena, London, England	
1	Win	1–0	Klaudia Ferenczi	PTS	4	26 Mar 2022	Wembley Arena, London, England	
