= Nesrine =

Nesrine is a given name. Notable people with the name include:

- Nesrine Ben Kahia (born 1986), Tunisian table tennis player
- Nesrine Daoula (born 1990), Tunisian handball player
- Nesrine Hamza (born 1993), Tunisian handball player
