= Veranes =

Veranes is a Spanish surname. Notable people with the surname include:

- Livia Veranes (born 1993), Cuban handball player
- Sibelis Veranes (born 1974), Cuban judoka
