= Tysie Gallagher =

English boxer (born 1998)

Personal information
- Nickname: The First Lady
- Born: 27 June 1998 (age 28) Luton, Bedfordshire, England
- Height: 164 cm (5 ft 5 in)
- Weight: Super-bantamweight

Boxing career
- Stance: Orthodox

Boxing record
- Total fights: 13
- Wins: 11
- Win by KO: 0
- Losses: 2

Tysie Gallagher (born 27 June 1998) is an English professional boxer who is the inaugural British female super-bantamweight champion as well as the Commonwealth title holder in the same weight division.

== Early life and amateur boxing career ==
Gallagher started boxing aged 11 when her mother took her to a class at a community centre. As an amateur she won a junior national title and was involved in the Team England set up, although she had less than 30 fights in the unpaid ranks.

== Professional boxing career ==
Gallagher made her professional debut on 30 October 2021, securing a points victory over Spain's Vanesa Caballero in a six-round contest at Woodside Leisure Centre in Watford.

On 30 July 2022, Gallagher fought Nina Hughes for the vacant Commonwealth and WBO International female super-bantamweight titles, losing the bout at the Civic Hall in Grays, Essex, by majority decision. Two ringside judges scored the fight for Hughes 97-93 and 96-94 with the third seeing it as a 95-95 tie.

However, the setback proved to be temporary as, after Hughes became WBA female super-bantamweight champion and vacated the Commonwealth belt, Gallagher beat Lisa Whiteside by unanimous decision to claim the championship at the second attempt in a contest held at York Hall in London on 14 April 2023.

In her next outing, Gallagher challenged Ségolène Lefebvre for the WBO female super-bantamweight title, losing the bout at Hippodrome Municipal in Douai, France, on 24 November 2023, by majority decision. One judge scored the fight 95-95 but was overruled by the other two who gave it for Lefebvre 97-93 and 96-94.

Gallagher became the inaugural British female super-bantamweight champion and retained her Commonwealth title by defeating Stevi Levy via unanimous decision at York Hall in London on 24 May 2024.

She successfully defended her titles against Tori-Ellis Willetts at Park Community Arena in Sheffield on 27 September 2024, winning by unanimous decision and claiming the vacant WBO International female super-bantamweight title in the process.

Gallagher was scheduled to return to the same venue to face Ebonie Jones on 7 February 2025, but the fight was postponed following the death of her partner's mother in an incident for which a man was charged with murder. He was later convicted and sentenced to a minimum of 25 years in prison. The bout was rescheduled to take place at the Eco-Power Stadium in Doncaster on 23 May 2025, but was cancelled when Jones failed to make the required weight.

Exactly a year since her previous fight, Gallagher defended her titles against the previously unbeaten Ellie Hellewell at Park Community Arena in Sheffield on 27 September 2025. She won via unanimous decision.

Gallagher was scheduled to face unbeaten Teresa Makinen in a non-title contest over eight-rounds at Olympia London on 5 April 2026. However, the fight was cancelled when she suffered an elbow injury while sparring during training camp.

In June 2026, Gallagher signed a multi-year promotional contract with Jake Paul-led Most Valuable Promotions. She was due to make her debut for the promotion in a six-round bout against Ashleigh Johnson at bp pulse LIVE in Birmingham on 29 August 2026. On 5 August, Skye Nicolson withdrew from the event leading to Gallagher being moved up the card to face a different, to be announced, opponent over eight-rounds. Her opponent was subsequently named as undefeated American boxer Brandi Robinson. Gallagher won the fight on points 77-75.

== Personal life ==
Gallagher was diagnosed with Attention Deficit Hyperactivity Disorder (ADHD) when she was 11. She has a daughter.

== Professional boxing record ==
13 fights	11 wins	2 losses
By decision	11	2

No.	Result	Record	Opponent	Type	Round, time	Date	Location	Notes
13	Win	11–2	Brandi Robinson	PTS	8	29 Aug 2026	bp pulse LIVE, Birmingham, England	
12	Win	10–2	Ellie Hellewell	UD	10	27 Sep 2025	Park Community Arena, Sheffield, England	Retained British, Commonwealth and WBO International female super-bantamweight titles
11	Win	9–2	Tori-Ellis Willetts	UD	10	27 Sep 2024	Park Community Arena, Sheffield, England	Retained British and Commonwealth female super-bantamweight titles; won vacant WBO International female super-bantamweight title
10	Win	8–2	Stevi Levy	UD	10	24 May 2024	York Hall, London, England	Retained Commonwealth female super-bantamweight title; won inaugural British female super-bantamweight title
9	Win	7–2	Jamillette Janitza Vallejos	PTS	8	9 Mar 2024	York Hall, London, England	
8	Loss	6–2	Ségolène Lefebvre	MD	10	24 Nov 2023	Hippodrome Municipal, Douai, France	For WBO female super-bantamweight title
7	Win	6–1	Lisa Whiteside	UD	10	14 Apr 2023	York Hall, London, England	Won vacant Commonwealth female super-bantamweight title
6	Win	5–1	Wendellin Cruz	PTS	6	12 Dec 2022	York Hall, London, England	
5	Loss	4–1	Nina Hughes	MD	10	30 Jul 2022	Civic Hall, Grays, England	For vacant Commonwealth and WBO International female super-bantamweight titles
4	Win	4–0	Jamillette Janitza Vallejos	PTS	6	21 May 2022	Woodside Leisure Centre, Watford, England	
3	Win	3–0	Klaudia Ferenczi	PTS	6	26 Feb 2022	Woodside Leisure Centre, Watford, England	
2	Win	2–0	Gemma Ruegg	PTS	6	26 Nov 2021	Double Tree Hilton Hotel, Sheffield, England	
1	Win	1–0	Vanesa Caballero	PTS	6	30 Oct 2021	Woodside Leisure Centre, Watford, England	
