= 2015 World Women's Handball Championship =

2015 edition of the World Women's Handball Championship

Tournament details
- Host country: Denmark
- Venues: 4 (in 4 host cities)
- Dates: 5–20 December
- Teams: 24 (from 5 confederations)

Final positions
- Champions: Norway (3rd title)
- Runners-up: Netherlands
- Third place: Romania
- Fourth place: Poland

Tournament statistics
- Matches played: 88
- Goals scored: 4,714 (53.57 per match)
- Attendance: 304,436 (3,460 per match)
- Top scorer(s): (Romania) Cristina Neagu (63 goals)

Awards
- Best player: (Romania) Cristina Neagu

The 2015 IHF World Women's Handball Championship, the 22nd event hosted by the International Handball Federation, was held in Denmark. The decision to select Denmark as the host was announced on 27 January 2011.

In the final Norway won 31–23 against the Netherlands to gain their third title. Romania won bronze after they defeated Poland 31–22.

== Venues ==
Venues for the tournament were announced on 7 June 2014. Jyske Bank Boxen in Herning hosted the final, both semi-finals, two quarter-finals, matches in the round of 16 and Denmark's group. SYDBANK Arena in Kolding was the venue of two quarter-finals, eighth-finals and neighbour Germany's group, while Arena Nord in Frederikshavn and the new venue in Næstved hosted one eighth-final and one group each.

Herning	Kolding
Jyske Bank Boxen; Capacity: 12,500	SYDBANK Arena; Capacity: 5,001
2015 World Women's Handball Championship is located in Denmark
Frederikshavn	Næstved
Arena Nord; Capacity: 2,800	Næstved Arena; Planned capacity: 3,500

== Qualification ==
Competition	Dates	Vacancies	Qualified
Host nation	27 January 2011	1	Denmark
2013 World Championship	6–22 December 2013	1	Brazil
2014 African Women's Handball Championship	16–25 January 2014	3	Tunisia; DR Congo; Angola
2014 European Women's Handball Championship	7–21 December 2014	1	Norway
2015 Asian Women's Handball Championship	14–23 March 2015	3	South Korea; Japan; China
2015 Pan American Women's Handball Championship	21–28 May 2015	3	Cuba; Argentina; Puerto Rico
European qualification	8 October 2014 – 14 June 2015	9	France; Hungary; Montenegro; Netherlands; Poland; Romania; Russia; Spain; Sweden
Final qualification tournament	15–17 June 2015	1	Kazakhstan
Wildcard	22 June 2015	2	Germany; Serbia

=== Final qualification tournament ===
A final qualification tournament was held from 15 to 17 June 2015 in Almaty, Kazakhstan to determine the last participant. The schedule was revealed on 3 June 2015.

==== Standings ====
Pos	Team	Pld	W	D	L	GF	GA	GD	Pts	Qualification
1	Kazakhstan	3	3	0	0	94	65	+29	6	Qualified for World Championship
2	Congo	3	2	0	1	86	73	+13	4	
3	Mexico	3	1	0	2	69	72	−3	2	
4	Australia	3	0	0	3	49	88	−39	0	

Rules for classification: 1) points; 2) head-to-head points; 3) head-to-head goal difference; 4) head-to-head number of goals scored; 5) Goal difference.

==== Results ====
15 June 2015; 18:00	Mexico	24–16	Australia	Almaty; Referees: Alpaizde, Berezkina (RUS)
15 June 2015; 18:00		(13–8)		Almaty; Referees: Alpaizde, Berezkina (RUS)
15 June 2015; 18:00		Report		Almaty; Referees: Alpaizde, Berezkina (RUS)

15 June 2015; 20:00	Kazakhstan	36–24	Congo	Almaty; Referees: Florescu, Stoia (ROU)
15 June 2015; 20:00		(22–11)		Almaty; Referees: Florescu, Stoia (ROU)
15 June 2015; 20:00		Report		Almaty; Referees: Florescu, Stoia (ROU)

16 June 2015; 17:00	Australia	12–32	Congo	Almaty
16 June 2015; 17:00		(6–13)		Almaty

16 June 2015; 19:00	Kazakhstan	26–20	Mexico	Almaty
16 June 2015; 19:00		(12–9)		Almaty

17 June 2015; 17:00	Mexico	25–30	Congo	Almaty
17 June 2015; 17:00		(12–16)		Almaty

17 June 2015; 19:00	Kazakhstan	32–21	Australia	Almaty
17 June 2015; 19:00		(17–9)		Almaty

== Qualified teams ==
Country	Qualified as	Qualification date	Previous appearances in tournament^{1}
Denmark	Host	27 January 2011	17 (1957, 1962, 1965, 1971, 1973, 1975, 1990, 1993, 1995, **1997**, 1999, 2001, 2003, 2005, 2009, 2011, 2013)
Brazil	2013 World Champion	22 December 2013	10 (1995, 1997, 1999, 2001, 2003, 2005, 2007, 2009, 2011, **2013**)
DR Congo	Finalist of 2014 African Championship	24 January 2014	1 (2013)
Tunisia	Finalist of 2014 African Championship	24 January 2014	7 (1975, 2001, 2003, 2007, 2009, 2011, 2013)
Angola	Third place of 2014 African Championship	25 January 2014	12 (1990, 1993, 1995, 1997, 1999, 2001, 2003, 2005, 2007, 2009, 2011, 2013)
Norway	2014 European Champion	21 December 2014	17 (1971, 1973, 1975, 1982, 1986, 1990, 1993, 1995, 1997, **1999**, 2001, 2003, 2005, 2007, 2009, **2011**, 2013)
South Korea	Finalist of 2015 Asian Championship	21 March 2015	15 (1978, 1982, 1986, 1990, 1993, **1995**, 1997, 1999, 2001, 2003, 2005, 2007, 2009, 2011, 2013)
Japan	Finalist of 2015 Asian Championship	21 March 2015	16 (1962, 1965, 1971, 1973, 1975, 1986, 1995, 1997, 1999, 2001, 2003, 2005, 2007, 2009, 2011, 2013)
China	Third place of 2015 Asian Championship	23 March 2015	13 (1986, 1990, 1993, 1995, 1997, 1999, 2001, 2003, 2005, 2007, 2009, 2011, 2013)
Cuba	Semifinalist of 2015 Pan American Championship	24 May 2015	2 (1999, 2011)
Puerto Rico	Semifinalist of 2015 Pan American Championship	25 May 2015	0 (Debut)
Argentina	Semifinalist of 2015 Pan American Championship	25 May 2015	7 (1999, 2003, 2005, 2007, 2009, 2011, 2013)
Hungary	European playoff winner	13 June 2015	19 (1957, 1962, **1965**, 1971, 1973, 1975, 1978, 1982, 1986, 1993, 1995, 1997, 1999, 2001, 2003, 2005, 2007, 2009, 2013)
France	European playoff winner	13 June 2015	11 (1986, 1990, 1997, 1999, 2001, **2003**, 2005, 2007, 2009, 2011, 2013)
Russia	European playoff winner	13 June 2015	10 (1993, 1995, 1997, 1999, **2001**, 2003, **2005**, **2007**, **2009**, 2011)
Romania	European playoff winner	13 June 2015	21 (1957, **1962**, 1965, 1971, 1973, 1975, 1978, 1982, 1986, 1990, 1993, 1995, 1997, 1999, 2001, 2003, 2005, 2007, 2009, 2011, 2013)
Netherlands	European playoff winner	13 June 2015	9 (1971, 1973, 1978, 1986, 1999, 2001, 2005, 2011, 2013)
Spain	European playoff winner	14 June 2015	7 (1993, 2001, 2003, 2007, 2009, 2011, 2013)
Poland	European playoff winner	14 June 2015	14 (1957, 1962, 1965, 1973, 1975, 1978, 1986, 1990, 1993, 1997, 1999, 2005, 2007, 2013)
Montenegro	European playoff winner	14 June 2015	2 (2011, 2013)
Sweden	European playoff winner	14 June 2015	7 (1957, 1990, 1993, 1995, 2001, 2009, 2011)
Kazakhstan	Final qualification tournament winner	16 June 2015	3 (2007, 2009, 2011)
Germany	Wildcard	22 June 2015	10 (**1993**, 1995, 1997, 1999, 2003, 2005, 2007, 2009, 2011, 2013)
Serbia	Wildcard	22 June 2015	1 (2013)

^{1} Bold indicates champion for that year, Italics indicates host for that year.

== Referees ==
17 referee pairs were selected:

Referees
Argentina	Julian Grillo; Sebastián Lenci
Bahrain	Hussain Al-Mawt; Sameer Marhoon
Ivory Coast	Yalatima Coulibaly; Mamadou Diabaté
Denmark	Anders Birch; Dennis Stenrand
France	Charlotte Bonaventura; Julie Bonaventura
Germany	Robert Schulze; Tobias Tönnies
Hungary	Péter Horváth; Balázs Marton
Iceland	Jónas Elíasson; Anton Pålsson
Japan	Tomoko Ota; Mariko Shimajiri

Referees
South Korea	Lee Se-ok; Koo Bon-ok
Norway	Kjersti Arntsen; Guro Røen
Romania	Diana Florescu; Anamaria Stoia
Russia	Viktoria Alpaidze; Tatiana Berezkina
Slovenia	Bojan Lah; David Sok
Serbia	Vanja Antić; Jelena Jakovljević
Spain	Ignacio García; Andreu Marín
Tunisia	Ismail Boualloucha; Ramzi Khenissi

== Draw ==
The draw was held on 24 June 2015 at Koldinghus in Kolding, Denmark at 20:00 local time.

=== Seeding ===
The seeding was announced on 23 June 2015.

Pot 1	Pot 2	Pot 3	Pot 4	Pot 5	Pot 6
Brazil; Cuba; Norway; Denmark	Spain; Sweden; Montenegro; France	Hungary; Netherlands; Argentina; Romania	Russia; South Korea; Poland; Japan	Tunisia; DR Congo; China; Puerto Rico	Angola; Serbia; Germany; Kazakhstan

== Preliminary round ==
All times are local (UTC+1).

=== Group A ===
Pos	Team	Pld	W	D	L	GF	GA	GD	Pts	Qualification
1	Montenegro	5	4	1	0	149	113	+36	9	Round of 16
2	Hungary	5	4	0	1	146	121	+25	8	Round of 16
3	Denmark (H)	5	3	0	2	134	113	+21	6	Round of 16
4	Serbia	5	2	1	2	144	132	+12	5	Round of 16
5	Japan	5	1	0	4	118	138	−20	2	
6	Tunisia	5	0	0	5	108	182	−74	0	

Source: IHF
Rules for classification: 1) Points; 2) Head-to-head points; 3) Head-to-head goal difference; 4) Head-to-head goals scored; 5) Goal difference.
(H) Hosts

5 December 2015; 15:45	Montenegro	28–28	Serbia	Jyske Bank Boxen, Herning; Attendance: 4,700; Referees: García, Marín (ESP)
5 December 2015; 15:45	Bulatović 8	(16–14)	Krpež, Živković 6	Jyske Bank Boxen, Herning; Attendance: 4,700; Referees: García, Marín (ESP)
5 December 2015; 15:45	3× (yellow card) 7× (suspension)	Report	4× (yellow card) 4× (suspension) 1× (red card)	Jyske Bank Boxen, Herning; Attendance: 4,700; Referees: García, Marín (ESP)

5 December 2015; 18:00	Hungary	39–20	Tunisia	Jyske Bank Boxen, Herning; Attendance: 7,900; Referees: Alpaidze, Berezkina (RUS)
5 December 2015; 18:00	Tomori 6	(16–5)	Chebbah 10	Jyske Bank Boxen, Herning; Attendance: 7,900; Referees: Alpaidze, Berezkina (RUS)
5 December 2015; 18:00	1× (yellow card) 2× (suspension)	Report	2× (yellow card) 3× (suspension)	Jyske Bank Boxen, Herning; Attendance: 7,900; Referees: Alpaidze, Berezkina (RUS)

5 December 2015; 20:45	Denmark	30–21	Japan	Jyske Bank Boxen, Herning; Attendance: 12,500; Referees: Lenci, Grillo (ARG)
5 December 2015; 20:45	Gravholt 6	(17–11)	Honda 5	Jyske Bank Boxen, Herning; Attendance: 12,500; Referees: Lenci, Grillo (ARG)
5 December 2015; 20:45	3× (yellow card) 3× (suspension)	Report	2× (yellow card) 3× (suspension)	Jyske Bank Boxen, Herning; Attendance: 12,500; Referees: Lenci, Grillo (ARG)

6 December 2015; 16:15	Japan	23–29	Montenegro	Jyske Bank Boxen, Herning; Attendance: 2,500; Referees: Alpaidze, Berezkina (RUS)
6 December 2015; 16:15	Sunami 9	(15–17)	Radičević 10	Jyske Bank Boxen, Herning; Attendance: 2,500; Referees: Alpaidze, Berezkina (RUS)
6 December 2015; 16:15	2× (yellow card) 5× (suspension)	Report	4× (yellow card) 3× (suspension)	Jyske Bank Boxen, Herning; Attendance: 2,500; Referees: Alpaidze, Berezkina (RUS)

6 December 2015; 18:30	Serbia	26–32	Hungary	Jyske Bank Boxen, Herning; Attendance: 5,800; Referees: Grillo, Lenci (ARG)
6 December 2015; 18:30	Krpež 5	(16–18)	Tomori 10	Jyske Bank Boxen, Herning; Attendance: 5,800; Referees: Grillo, Lenci (ARG)
6 December 2015; 18:30	3× (yellow card) 7× (suspension)	Report	4× (yellow card) 7× (suspension)	Jyske Bank Boxen, Herning; Attendance: 5,800; Referees: Grillo, Lenci (ARG)

6 December 2015; 20:45	Tunisia	20–32	Denmark	Jyske Bank Boxen, Herning; Attendance: 12,000; Referees: Coulibaly, Diabaté (CIV)
6 December 2015; 20:45	Chebbah, Jlezi 5	(10–16)	three players 6	Jyske Bank Boxen, Herning; Attendance: 12,000; Referees: Coulibaly, Diabaté (CIV)
6 December 2015; 20:45	3× (yellow card) 3× (suspension)	Report	3× (yellow card) 3× (suspension)	Jyske Bank Boxen, Herning; Attendance: 12,000; Referees: Coulibaly, Diabaté (CIV)

8 December 2015; 16:15	Japan	31–21	Tunisia	Jyske Bank Boxen, Herning; Attendance: 2,000; Referees: Alpaidze, Berezkina (RUS)
8 December 2015; 16:15	Hara 9	(13–9)	Jlezi 5	Jyske Bank Boxen, Herning; Attendance: 2,000; Referees: Alpaidze, Berezkina (RUS)
8 December 2015; 16:15	2× (yellow card) 5× (suspension)	Report	2× (yellow card) 5× (suspension)	Jyske Bank Boxen, Herning; Attendance: 2,000; Referees: Alpaidze, Berezkina (RUS)

8 December 2015; 18:30	Montenegro	32–15	Hungary	Jyske Bank Boxen, Herning; Attendance: 7,000; Referees: Arntsen, Røen (NOR)
8 December 2015; 18:30	three players 6	(17–9)	three players 3	Jyske Bank Boxen, Herning; Attendance: 7,000; Referees: Arntsen, Røen (NOR)
8 December 2015; 18:30	3× (yellow card) 4× (suspension)	Report	2× (yellow card) 1× (suspension)	Jyske Bank Boxen, Herning; Attendance: 7,000; Referees: Arntsen, Røen (NOR)

8 December 2015; 20:45	Denmark	29–20	Serbia	Jyske Bank Boxen, Herning; Attendance: 12,500; Referees: Schulze, Tönnies (GER)
8 December 2015; 20:45	L. Jørgensen 7	(13–12)	Liščević 5	Jyske Bank Boxen, Herning; Attendance: 12,500; Referees: Schulze, Tönnies (GER)
8 December 2015; 20:45	3× (yellow card) 7× (suspension)	Report	3× (yellow card) 7× (suspension)	Jyske Bank Boxen, Herning; Attendance: 12,500; Referees: Schulze, Tönnies (GER)

9 December 2015; 16:15	Montenegro	37–26	Tunisia	Jyske Bank Boxen, Herning; Attendance: 1,700; Referees: Lenci, Grillo (ARG)
9 December 2015; 16:15	Jauković 9	(19–12)	Chebbah 9	Jyske Bank Boxen, Herning; Attendance: 1,700; Referees: Lenci, Grillo (ARG)
9 December 2015; 16:15	3× (yellow card) 6× (suspension)	Report	2× (yellow card) 2× (suspension)	Jyske Bank Boxen, Herning; Attendance: 1,700; Referees: Lenci, Grillo (ARG)

9 December 2015; 18:30	Serbia	27–22	Japan	Jyske Bank Boxen, Herning; Attendance: 7,000; Referees: Coulibaly, Diabaté (CIV)
9 December 2015; 18:30	Krpež 6	(13–12)	Ishitate, Sunami 5	Jyske Bank Boxen, Herning; Attendance: 7,000; Referees: Coulibaly, Diabaté (CIV)
9 December 2015; 18:30	3× (yellow card) 5× (suspension)	Report	2× (yellow card) 5× (suspension)	Jyske Bank Boxen, Herning; Attendance: 7,000; Referees: Coulibaly, Diabaté (CIV)

9 December 2015; 20:45	Hungary	29–22	Denmark	Jyske Bank Boxen, Herning; Attendance: 12,500; Referees: Arntsen, Røen (NOR)
9 December 2015; 20:45	Szucsánszki 8	(15–12)	S. Jørgensen 4	Jyske Bank Boxen, Herning; Attendance: 12,500; Referees: Arntsen, Røen (NOR)
9 December 2015; 20:45	1× (yellow card) 4× (suspension)	Report	3× (yellow card) 5× (suspension)	Jyske Bank Boxen, Herning; Attendance: 12,500; Referees: Arntsen, Røen (NOR)

11 December 2015; 16:15	Hungary	31–21	Japan	Jyske Bank Boxen, Herning; Attendance: 1,500; Referees: Schulze, Tönnies (GER)
11 December 2015; 16:15	Triscsuk 6	(17–11)	Fujii 6	Jyske Bank Boxen, Herning; Attendance: 1,500; Referees: Schulze, Tönnies (GER)
11 December 2015; 16:15	3× (yellow card) 3× (suspension)	Report	2× (yellow card) 5× (suspension)	Jyske Bank Boxen, Herning; Attendance: 1,500; Referees: Schulze, Tönnies (GER)

11 December 2015; 18:30	Tunisia	21–43	Serbia	Jyske Bank Boxen, Herning; Attendance: 4,000; Referees: Arntsen, Røen (NOR)
11 December 2015; 18:30	three players 4	(10–23)	Krpež 11	Jyske Bank Boxen, Herning; Attendance: 4,000; Referees: Arntsen, Røen (NOR)
11 December 2015; 18:30	3× (yellow card) 5× (suspension)	Report	3× (yellow card) 3× (suspension)	Jyske Bank Boxen, Herning; Attendance: 4,000; Referees: Arntsen, Røen (NOR)

11 December 2015; 20:45	Denmark	21–23	Montenegro	Jyske Bank Boxen, Herning; Attendance: 12,500; Referees: García, Marín (ESP)
11 December 2015; 20:45	Hansen 8	(7–12)	Jauković 7	Jyske Bank Boxen, Herning; Attendance: 12,500; Referees: García, Marín (ESP)
11 December 2015; 20:45	3× (yellow card) 2× (suspension)	Report	3× (yellow card) 5× (suspension)	Jyske Bank Boxen, Herning; Attendance: 12,500; Referees: García, Marín (ESP)

=== Group B ===
Pos	Team	Pld	W	D	L	GF	GA	GD	Pts	Qualification
1	Netherlands	5	4	1	0	183	116	+67	9 (Note: Sweden–Netherlands 28–28)	Round of 16
2	Sweden	5	4	1	0	192	134	+58	9	Round of 16
3	Poland	5	3	0	2	135	135	0	6	Round of 16
4	Angola	5	2	0	3	144	155	−11	4	Round of 16
5	China	5	1	0	4	141	180	−39	2	
6	Cuba	5	0	0	5	123	198	−75	0	

Source: IHF
Rules for classification: 1) Points; 2) Head-to-head points; 3) Head-to-head goal difference; 4) Head-to-head goals scored; 5) Goal difference.
Notes:

5 December 2015; 16:15	Netherlands	42–21	China	Næstved Arena, Næstved; Attendance: 2,950; Referees: Bonaventura, Bonaventura (FRA)
5 December 2015; 16:15	Abbingh, Broch 7	(19–9)	Qiao 5	Næstved Arena, Næstved; Attendance: 2,950; Referees: Bonaventura, Bonaventura (FRA)
5 December 2015; 16:15	2× (yellow card) 1× (suspension)	Report	3× (yellow card) 5× (suspension)	Næstved Arena, Næstved; Attendance: 2,950; Referees: Bonaventura, Bonaventura (FRA)

5 December 2015; 18:30	Cuba	22–27	Poland	Næstved Arena, Næstved; Attendance: 3,112; Referees: Schulze, Tönnies (GER)
5 December 2015; 18:30	Martínez 8	(11–12)	Kudłacz-Gloc 11	Næstved Arena, Næstved; Attendance: 3,112; Referees: Schulze, Tönnies (GER)
5 December 2015; 18:30	2× (yellow card) 4× (suspension)	Report	4× (yellow card) 3× (suspension)	Næstved Arena, Næstved; Attendance: 3,112; Referees: Schulze, Tönnies (GER)

5 December 2015; 20:45	Sweden	37–23	Angola	Næstved Arena, Næstved; Attendance: 3,204; Referees: Florescu, Stoia (ROU)
5 December 2015; 20:45	Hagman 8	(18–12)	André 6	Næstved Arena, Næstved; Attendance: 3,204; Referees: Florescu, Stoia (ROU)
5 December 2015; 20:45	3× (yellow card) 5× (suspension)	Report	3× (yellow card) 2× (suspension) 1× (red card)	Næstved Arena, Næstved; Attendance: 3,204; Referees: Florescu, Stoia (ROU)

6 December 2015; 16:15	China	39–30	Cuba	Næstved Arena, Næstved; Attendance: 1,475; Referees: Florescu, Sola (ROU)
6 December 2015; 16:15	Zhang 8	(22–15)	Varanes 7	Næstved Arena, Næstved; Attendance: 1,475; Referees: Florescu, Sola (ROU)
6 December 2015; 16:15	3× (yellow card) 7× (suspension)	Report	2× (yellow card) 4× (suspension)	Næstved Arena, Næstved; Attendance: 1,475; Referees: Florescu, Sola (ROU)

6 December 2015; 18:30	Angola	24–37	Netherlands	Næstved Arena, Næstved; Attendance: 2,850; Referees: Lee, Koo (KOR)
6 December 2015; 18:30	André 5	(11–19)	Polman 12	Næstved Arena, Næstved; Attendance: 2,850; Referees: Lee, Koo (KOR)
6 December 2015; 18:30	3× (yellow card) 7× (suspension)	Report	3× (yellow card) 3× (suspension)	Næstved Arena, Næstved; Attendance: 2,850; Referees: Lee, Koo (KOR)

6 December 2015; 20:45	Poland	30–31	Sweden	Næstved Arena, Næstved; Attendance: 3,120; Referees: Bonaventura, Bonaventura (FRA)
6 December 2015; 20:45	Kudłacz-Gloc 6	(13–15)	Hagman 7	Næstved Arena, Næstved; Attendance: 3,120; Referees: Bonaventura, Bonaventura (FRA)
6 December 2015; 20:45	3× (yellow card) 2× (suspension)	Report	3× (yellow card) 5× (suspension)	Næstved Arena, Næstved; Attendance: 3,120; Referees: Bonaventura, Bonaventura (FRA)

8 December 2015; 16:15	Cuba	23–38	Angola	Næstved Arena, Næstved; Attendance: 1,284; Referees: Bonaventura, Bonaventura (FRA)
8 December 2015; 16:15	three players 4	(14–20)	Bernardo, Viegas 7	Næstved Arena, Næstved; Attendance: 1,284; Referees: Bonaventura, Bonaventura (FRA)
8 December 2015; 16:15	3× (yellow card) 6× (suspension) 1× (red card)	Report	2× (yellow card) 4× (suspension)	Næstved Arena, Næstved; Attendance: 1,284; Referees: Bonaventura, Bonaventura (FRA)

8 December 2015; 18:30	Poland	29–24	China	Næstved Arena, Næstved; Attendance: 2,584; Referees: Koo, Lee (KOR)
8 December 2015; 18:30	Kudłacz-Gloc 7	(12–11)	Jin 8	Næstved Arena, Næstved; Attendance: 2,584; Referees: Koo, Lee (KOR)
8 December 2015; 18:30	4× (yellow card) 7× (suspension)	Report	3× (yellow card) 7× (suspension)	Næstved Arena, Næstved; Attendance: 2,584; Referees: Koo, Lee (KOR)

8 December 2015; 20:45	Sweden	28–28	Netherlands	Næstved Arena, Næstved; Attendance: 2,894; Referees: García, Marín (ESP)
8 December 2015; 20:45	Gulldén 8	(12–15)	Groot 9	Næstved Arena, Næstved; Attendance: 2,894; Referees: García, Marín (ESP)
8 December 2015; 20:45	4× (yellow card) 5× (suspension)	Report	4× (yellow card) 4× (suspension) 1× (red card)	Næstved Arena, Næstved; Attendance: 2,894; Referees: García, Marín (ESP)

9 December 2015; 16:15	Cuba	23–45	Netherlands	Næstved Arena, Næstved; Attendance: 1,494; Referees: Koo, Lee (KOR)
9 December 2015; 16:15	Lusson, Rizo 7	(13–20)	Abbingh 8	Næstved Arena, Næstved; Attendance: 1,494; Referees: Koo, Lee (KOR)
9 December 2015; 16:15	2× (yellow card) 8× (suspension)	Report	2× (yellow card) 3× (suspension)	Næstved Arena, Næstved; Attendance: 1,494; Referees: Koo, Lee (KOR)

9 December 2015; 18:30	Angola	27–29	Poland	Næstved Arena, Næstved; Attendance: 2,820; Referees: García, Marín (ESP)
9 December 2015; 18:30	Bernardo 8	(15–12)	Kocela 7	Næstved Arena, Næstved; Attendance: 2,820; Referees: García, Marín (ESP)
9 December 2015; 18:30	3× (yellow card) 2× (suspension)	Report	3× (yellow card) 6× (suspension) 1× (red card)	Næstved Arena, Næstved; Attendance: 2,820; Referees: García, Marín (ESP)

9 December 2015; 20:45	Sweden	47–28	China	Næstved Arena, Næstved; Attendance: 2,864; Referees: Florescu, Stoia (ROU)
9 December 2015; 20:45	Roberts 10	(25–14)	Yan 9	Næstved Arena, Næstved; Attendance: 2,864; Referees: Florescu, Stoia (ROU)
9 December 2015; 20:45	3× (yellow card) 2× (suspension)	Report	4× (yellow card) 4× (suspension)	Næstved Arena, Næstved; Attendance: 2,864; Referees: Florescu, Stoia (ROU)

11 December 2015; 16:15	China	29–32	Angola	Næstved Arena, Næstved; Attendance: 1,628; Referees: Koo, Lee (KOR)
11 December 2015; 16:15	Qiao 5	(11–15)	Bernardo 10	Næstved Arena, Næstved; Attendance: 1,628; Referees: Koo, Lee (KOR)
11 December 2015; 16:15	3× (yellow card) 1× (suspension)	Report	4× (yellow card)	Næstved Arena, Næstved; Attendance: 1,628; Referees: Koo, Lee (KOR)

11 December 2015; 18:30	Netherlands	31–20	Poland	Næstved Arena, Næstved; Attendance: 2,652; Referees: Bonaventura, Bonaventura (FRA)
11 December 2015; 18:30	Abbingh 7	(14–9)	Achruk, Niedźwiedź 5	Næstved Arena, Næstved; Attendance: 2,652; Referees: Bonaventura, Bonaventura (FRA)
11 December 2015; 18:30	2× (yellow card) 1× (suspension)	Report	4× (yellow card) 3× (suspension)	Næstved Arena, Næstved; Attendance: 2,652; Referees: Bonaventura, Bonaventura (FRA)

11 December 2015; 20:45	Cuba	25–49	Sweden	Næstved Arena, Næstved; Attendance: 2,781; Referees: Florescu, Stoia (ROU)
11 December 2015; 20:45	Martínez 7	(12–23)	Hagman 14	Næstved Arena, Næstved; Attendance: 2,781; Referees: Florescu, Stoia (ROU)
11 December 2015; 20:45	3× (yellow card) 7× (suspension)	Report	3× (yellow card) 4× (suspension)	Næstved Arena, Næstved; Attendance: 2,781; Referees: Florescu, Stoia (ROU)

=== Group C ===
Pos	Team	Pld	W	D	L	GF	GA	GD	Pts	Qualification
1	Brazil	5	4	1	0	118	95	+23	9	Round of 16
2	France	5	3	1	1	121	91	+30	7	Round of 16
3	Germany	5	3	0	2	151	114	+37	6 (Note: Germany–South Korea 40–28)	Round of 16
4	South Korea	5	2	2	1	138	125	+13	6	Round of 16
5	Argentina	5	1	0	4	89	120	−31	2	
6	DR Congo	5	0	0	5	78	150	−72	0	

Source: IHF
Rules for classification: 1) Points; 2) Head-to-head points; 3) Head-to-head goal difference; 4) Head-to-head goals scored; 5) Goal difference.
Notes:

5 December 2015; 16:00	Argentina	23–15	DR Congo	SYDBANK Arena, Kolding; Attendance: 1,752; Referees: Boualloucha, Khenissi (TUN)
5 December 2015; 16:00	Pizzo 5	(11–10)	Mwasesa 6	SYDBANK Arena, Kolding; Attendance: 1,752; Referees: Boualloucha, Khenissi (TUN)
5 December 2015; 16:00	3× (yellow card) 1× (suspension)	Report	3× (yellow card) 6× (suspension) 1× (red card)	SYDBANK Arena, Kolding; Attendance: 1,752; Referees: Boualloucha, Khenissi (TUN)

5 December 2015; 18:15	France	30–20	Germany	SYDBANK Arena, Kolding; Attendance: 2,200; Referees: Al-Mawt, Marhoon (BHR)
5 December 2015; 18:15	Pineau 7	(16–7)	S. Müller 9	SYDBANK Arena, Kolding; Attendance: 2,200; Referees: Al-Mawt, Marhoon (BHR)
5 December 2015; 18:15	3× (yellow card) 3× (suspension)	Report	3× (yellow card) 2× (suspension)	SYDBANK Arena, Kolding; Attendance: 2,200; Referees: Al-Mawt, Marhoon (BHR)

5 December 2015; 20:30	Brazil	24–24	South Korea	SYDBANK Arena, Kolding; Attendance: 1,430; Referees: Birch, Stenrand (DEN)
5 December 2015; 20:30	Rodrigues 7	(10–12)	Ryu 7	SYDBANK Arena, Kolding; Attendance: 1,430; Referees: Birch, Stenrand (DEN)
5 December 2015; 20:30	3× (yellow card) 7× (suspension)	Report	2× (yellow card) 2× (suspension)	SYDBANK Arena, Kolding; Attendance: 1,430; Referees: Birch, Stenrand (DEN)

7 December 2015; 16:00	DR Congo	11–26	Brazil	SYDBANK Arena, Kolding; Attendance: 1,500; Referees: Al-Mawt, Marhoon (BHR)
7 December 2015; 16:00	Mwasesa 4	(4–14)	Do Nascimento 7	SYDBANK Arena, Kolding; Attendance: 1,500; Referees: Al-Mawt, Marhoon (BHR)
7 December 2015; 16:00	2× (yellow card) 7× (suspension)	Report	3× (yellow card) 2× (suspension)	SYDBANK Arena, Kolding; Attendance: 1,500; Referees: Al-Mawt, Marhoon (BHR)

7 December 2015; 18:15	South Korea	22–22	France	SYDBANK Arena, Kolding; Attendance: 2,100; Referees: Elíasson, Pålsson (ISL)
7 December 2015; 18:15	Jung J. 8	(11–11)	Nze Minko 7	SYDBANK Arena, Kolding; Attendance: 2,100; Referees: Elíasson, Pålsson (ISL)
7 December 2015; 18:15	4× (yellow card) 2× (suspension)	Report	4× (yellow card) 4× (suspension)	SYDBANK Arena, Kolding; Attendance: 2,100; Referees: Elíasson, Pålsson (ISL)

7 December 2015; 20:30	Germany	33–13	Argentina	SYDBANK Arena, Kolding; Attendance: 1,000; Referees: Birch, Stenrand (DEN)
7 December 2015; 20:30	S. Müller 7	(17–8)	Mendoza, Karsten 4	SYDBANK Arena, Kolding; Attendance: 1,000; Referees: Birch, Stenrand (DEN)
7 December 2015; 20:30	3× (yellow card) 3× (suspension)	Report	3× (yellow card) 3× (suspension)	SYDBANK Arena, Kolding; Attendance: 1,000; Referees: Birch, Stenrand (DEN)

8 December 2015; 16:00	South Korea	35–17	DR Congo	SYDBANK Arena, Kolding; Attendance: 1,200; Referees: Birch, Stenrand (DEN)
8 December 2015; 16:00	Choi 8	(14–6)	Mwasesa 7	SYDBANK Arena, Kolding; Attendance: 1,200; Referees: Birch, Stenrand (DEN)
8 December 2015; 16:00	3× (yellow card) 1× (suspension)	Report	3× (yellow card) 3× (suspension) 1× (red card)	SYDBANK Arena, Kolding; Attendance: 1,200; Referees: Birch, Stenrand (DEN)

8 December 2015; 18:15	France	20–12	Argentina	SYDBANK Arena, Kolding; Attendance: 1,300; Referees: Boualloucha, Khenissi (TUN)
8 December 2015; 18:15	three players 4	(13–6)	Mendoza 3	SYDBANK Arena, Kolding; Attendance: 1,300; Referees: Boualloucha, Khenissi (TUN)
8 December 2015; 18:15	3× (yellow card) 4× (suspension)	Report	3× (yellow card) 1× (suspension)	SYDBANK Arena, Kolding; Attendance: 1,300; Referees: Boualloucha, Khenissi (TUN)

8 December 2015; 20:30	Brazil	24–21	Germany	SYDBANK Arena, Kolding; Attendance: 1,500; Referees: Coulibaly, Diabaté (CIV)
8 December 2015; 20:30	Amorim 7	(9–8)	three players 4	SYDBANK Arena, Kolding; Attendance: 1,500; Referees: Coulibaly, Diabaté (CIV)
8 December 2015; 20:30	3× (yellow card) 4× (suspension)	Report	3× (yellow card) 3× (suspension)	SYDBANK Arena, Kolding; Attendance: 1,500; Referees: Coulibaly, Diabaté (CIV)

10 December 2015; 16:00	Argentina	19–23	Brazil	SYDBANK Arena, Kolding; Attendance: 1,800; Referees: Al-Mawt, Marhoon (BHR)
10 December 2015; 16:00	Pizzo 6	(8–11)	Fachinello 7	SYDBANK Arena, Kolding; Attendance: 1,800; Referees: Al-Mawt, Marhoon (BHR)
10 December 2015; 16:00	3× (yellow card) 5× (suspension)	Report	3× (yellow card) 4× (suspension)	SYDBANK Arena, Kolding; Attendance: 1,800; Referees: Al-Mawt, Marhoon (BHR)

10 December 2015; 18:15	France	29–16	DR Congo	SYDBANK Arena, Kolding; Attendance: 1,200; Referees: Birch, Stenrand (DEN)
10 December 2015; 18:15	Lacrabère 8	(14–10)	Mwasesa 7	SYDBANK Arena, Kolding; Attendance: 1,200; Referees: Birch, Stenrand (DEN)
10 December 2015; 18:15	3× (yellow card) 1× (suspension)	Report	2× (yellow card) 3× (suspension)	SYDBANK Arena, Kolding; Attendance: 1,200; Referees: Birch, Stenrand (DEN)

10 December 2015; 20:30	Germany	40–28	South Korea	SYDBANK Arena, Kolding; Attendance: 1,000; Referees: Boualloucha, Khenissi (TUN)
10 December 2015; 20:30	F. Müller, Smits 6	(14–15)	Gwon, Jung Y. 6	SYDBANK Arena, Kolding; Attendance: 1,000; Referees: Boualloucha, Khenissi (TUN)
10 December 2015; 20:30	4× (yellow card) 6× (suspension)	Report	3× (yellow card) 1× (suspension)	SYDBANK Arena, Kolding; Attendance: 1,000; Referees: Boualloucha, Khenissi (TUN)

11 December 2015; 16:00	Argentina	22–29	South Korea	SYDBANK Arena, Kolding; Attendance: 700; Referees: Alpaidze, Berezkina (RUS)
11 December 2015; 16:00	Pizzo 6	(12–14)	Jung J., Kim 6	SYDBANK Arena, Kolding; Attendance: 700; Referees: Alpaidze, Berezkina (RUS)
11 December 2015; 16:00	3× (yellow card) 4× (suspension)	Report	2× (yellow card) 5× (suspension)	SYDBANK Arena, Kolding; Attendance: 700; Referees: Alpaidze, Berezkina (RUS)

11 December 2015; 18:15	Brazil	21–20	France	SYDBANK Arena, Kolding; Attendance: 1,600; Referees: Birch, Stenrand (DEN)
11 December 2015; 18:15	Rodrigues 5	(11–9)	Pineau 6	SYDBANK Arena, Kolding; Attendance: 1,600; Referees: Birch, Stenrand (DEN)
11 December 2015; 18:15	4× (yellow card) 4× (suspension)	Report	4× (yellow card) 4× (suspension)	SYDBANK Arena, Kolding; Attendance: 1,600; Referees: Birch, Stenrand (DEN)

11 December 2015; 20:30	DR Congo	19–37	Germany	SYDBANK Arena, Kolding; Attendance: 300; Referees: Al-Mawt, Marhoon (BHR)
11 December 2015; 20:30	Lusamba, Milemba 4	(11–18)	Fischer, S. Müller 8	SYDBANK Arena, Kolding; Attendance: 300; Referees: Al-Mawt, Marhoon (BHR)
11 December 2015; 20:30	3× (yellow card) 3× (suspension)	Report	3× (yellow card) 4× (suspension)	SYDBANK Arena, Kolding; Attendance: 300; Referees: Al-Mawt, Marhoon (BHR)

=== Group D ===
Pos	Team	Pld	W	D	L	GF	GA	GD	Pts	Qualification
1	Russia	5	5	0	0	171	115	+56	10	Round of 16
2	Norway	5	4	0	1	159	106	+53	8	Round of 16
3	Spain	5	3	0	2	148	98	+50	6	Round of 16
4	Romania	5	2	0	3	150	116	+34	4	Round of 16
5	Puerto Rico	5	1	0	4	88	197	−109	2	
6	Kazakhstan	5	0	0	5	95	179	−84	0	

Source: IHF
Rules for classification: 1) Points; 2) Head-to-head points; 3) Head-to-head goal difference; 4) Head-to-head goals scored; 5) Goal difference.

5 December 2015; 16:00	Romania	47–14	Puerto Rico	Arena Nord, Frederikshavn; Attendance: 1,258; Referees: Antić, Jakovljević (SRB)
5 December 2015; 16:00	Chiper 10	(23–3)	Hiraldo 5	Arena Nord, Frederikshavn; Attendance: 1,258; Referees: Antić, Jakovljević (SRB)
5 December 2015; 16:00	2× (yellow card) 3× (suspension)	Report	3× (yellow card) 4× (suspension)	Arena Nord, Frederikshavn; Attendance: 1,258; Referees: Antić, Jakovljević (SRB)

5 December 2015; 18:15	Spain	31–10	Kazakhstan	Arena Nord, Frederikshavn; Attendance: 1,285; Referees: Ota, Shimajiri (JPN)
5 December 2015; 18:15	Martín 6	(16–5)	Tankina 4	Arena Nord, Frederikshavn; Attendance: 1,285; Referees: Ota, Shimajiri (JPN)
5 December 2015; 18:15	1× (yellow card)	Report	3× (yellow card) 2× (suspension)	Arena Nord, Frederikshavn; Attendance: 1,285; Referees: Ota, Shimajiri (JPN)

5 December 2015; 20:30	Norway	25–26	Russia	Arena Nord, Frederikshavn; Attendance: 1,360; Referees: Horváth, Marton (HUN)
5 December 2015; 20:30	Mørk 6	(11–14)	Vyakhireva 9	Arena Nord, Frederikshavn; Attendance: 1,360; Referees: Horváth, Marton (HUN)
5 December 2015; 20:30	3× (yellow card) 4× (suspension)	Report	3× (yellow card) 6× (suspension)	Arena Nord, Frederikshavn; Attendance: 1,360; Referees: Horváth, Marton (HUN)

7 December 2015; 16:00	Kazakhstan	20–36	Romania	Arena Nord, Frederikshavn; Attendance: 771; Referees: Horváth, Marton (HUN)
7 December 2015; 16:00	Alexandrova 7	(12–18)	Manea, Nechita 6	Arena Nord, Frederikshavn; Attendance: 771; Referees: Horváth, Marton (HUN)
7 December 2015; 16:00	2× (yellow card) 7× (suspension) 1× (red card)	Report	2× (yellow card) 2× (suspension)	Arena Nord, Frederikshavn; Attendance: 771; Referees: Horváth, Marton (HUN)

7 December 2015; 18:15	Russia	28–26	Spain	Arena Nord, Frederikshavn; Attendance: 1,380; Referees: Lah, Sok (SLO)
7 December 2015; 18:15	Bliznova 7	(16–14)	Martín 6	Arena Nord, Frederikshavn; Attendance: 1,380; Referees: Lah, Sok (SLO)
7 December 2015; 18:15	3× (yellow card) 7× (suspension)	Report	3× (yellow card) 4× (suspension)	Arena Nord, Frederikshavn; Attendance: 1,380; Referees: Lah, Sok (SLO)

7 December 2015; 20:30	Puerto Rico	13–39	Norway	Arena Nord, Frederikshavn; Attendance: 1,516; Referees: Ota, Shimajiri (JPN)
7 December 2015; 20:30	Maldonado 4	(6–17)	Sulland 7	Arena Nord, Frederikshavn; Attendance: 1,516; Referees: Ota, Shimajiri (JPN)
7 December 2015; 20:30	3× (yellow card) 7× (suspension)	Report	3× (yellow card) 1× (suspension)	Arena Nord, Frederikshavn; Attendance: 1,516; Referees: Ota, Shimajiri (JPN)

8 December 2015; 16:00	Russia	45–18	Puerto Rico	Arena Nord, Frederikshavn; Attendance: 647; Referees: Horváth, Marton (HUN)
8 December 2015; 16:00	three players 6	(22–7)	Maldonado 5	Arena Nord, Frederikshavn; Attendance: 647; Referees: Horváth, Marton (HUN)
8 December 2015; 16:00	3× (yellow card) 4× (suspension) 1× (red card)	Report	3× (yellow card) 8× (suspension)	Arena Nord, Frederikshavn; Attendance: 647; Referees: Horváth, Marton (HUN)

8 December 2015; 18:15	Spain	26–18	Romania	Arena Nord, Frederikshavn; Attendance: 1,259; Referees: Antić, Jakovljević (SRB)
8 December 2015; 18:15	Pena 7	(13–12)	Neagu 6	Arena Nord, Frederikshavn; Attendance: 1,259; Referees: Antić, Jakovljević (SRB)
8 December 2015; 18:15	2× (yellow card) 2× (suspension)	Report	3× (yellow card) 2× (suspension)	Arena Nord, Frederikshavn; Attendance: 1,259; Referees: Antić, Jakovljević (SRB)

8 December 2015; 20:30	Norway	40–19	Kazakhstan	Arena Nord, Frederikshavn; Attendance: 1,384; Referees: Lah, Sok (SLO)
8 December 2015; 20:30	Herrem 7	(20–10)	Pikalova 6	Arena Nord, Frederikshavn; Attendance: 1,384; Referees: Lah, Sok (SLO)
8 December 2015; 20:30	3× (yellow card) 3× (suspension)	Report	3× (yellow card) 2× (suspension) 1× (red card)	Arena Nord, Frederikshavn; Attendance: 1,384; Referees: Lah, Sok (SLO)

10 December 2015; 16:00	Kazakhstan	19–42	Russia	Arena Nord, Frederikshavn; Attendance: 585; Referees: Antić, Jakovljević (AUT)
10 December 2015; 16:00	Rodina, Tankina 5	(9–24)	three players 7	Arena Nord, Frederikshavn; Attendance: 585; Referees: Antić, Jakovljević (AUT)
10 December 2015; 16:00	3× (yellow card) 1× (suspension)	Report	3× (yellow card) 1× (suspension)	Arena Nord, Frederikshavn; Attendance: 585; Referees: Antić, Jakovljević (AUT)

10 December 2015; 18:15	Spain	39–13	Puerto Rico	Arena Nord, Frederikshavn; Attendance: 1,060; Referees: Ota, Shimajiri (JPN)
10 December 2015; 18:15	López 8	(18–8)	Ceballos 4	Arena Nord, Frederikshavn; Attendance: 1,060; Referees: Ota, Shimajiri (JPN)
10 December 2015; 18:15	2× (yellow card) 2× (suspension)	Report	3× (yellow card) 6× (suspension)	Arena Nord, Frederikshavn; Attendance: 1,060; Referees: Ota, Shimajiri (JPN)

10 December 2015; 20:30	Romania	22–26	Norway	Arena Nord, Frederikshavn; Attendance: 1,610; Referees: Lah, Sok (SLO)
10 December 2015; 20:30	Neagu 8	(10–13)	Mørk 7	Arena Nord, Frederikshavn; Attendance: 1,610; Referees: Lah, Sok (SLO)
10 December 2015; 20:30	3× (yellow card) 2× (suspension)	Report	3× (yellow card) 3× (suspension)	Arena Nord, Frederikshavn; Attendance: 1,610; Referees: Lah, Sok (SLO)

11 December 2015; 16:00	Puerto Rico	30–27	Kazakhstan	Arena Nord, Frederikshavn; Attendance: 269; Referees: Ota, Shimajiri (JPN)
11 December 2015; 16:00	Maldonado 7	(18–14)	Pikalova 9	Arena Nord, Frederikshavn; Attendance: 269; Referees: Ota, Shimajiri (JPN)
11 December 2015; 16:00	3× (yellow card) 3× (suspension)	Report	3× (yellow card) 3× (suspension)	Arena Nord, Frederikshavn; Attendance: 269; Referees: Ota, Shimajiri (JPN)

11 December 2015; 18:15	Romania	27–30	Russia	Arena Nord, Frederikshavn; Attendance: 1,415; Referees: Horváth, Marton (HUN)
11 December 2015; 18:15	Ardean-Elisei 6	(16–17)	Vyakhireva 6	Arena Nord, Frederikshavn; Attendance: 1,415; Referees: Horváth, Marton (HUN)
11 December 2015; 18:15	3× (yellow card) 5× (suspension)	Report	3× (yellow card) 4× (suspension)	Arena Nord, Frederikshavn; Attendance: 1,415; Referees: Horváth, Marton (HUN)

11 December 2015; 20:30	Norway	29–26	Spain	Arena Nord, Frederikshavn; Attendance: 1,781; Referees: Lah, Sok (SLO)
11 December 2015; 20:30	Mørk 6	(18–12)	Pena 9	Arena Nord, Frederikshavn; Attendance: 1,781; Referees: Lah, Sok (SLO)
11 December 2015; 20:30	4× (yellow card) 5× (suspension) 1× (red card)	Report	3× (yellow card) 2× (suspension)	Arena Nord, Frederikshavn; Attendance: 1,781; Referees: Lah, Sok (SLO)

== President's Cup ==
=== 17–20th place playoff ===
17–20th place semifinals
13 December
Japan	24
China	29
13 December
Argentina	28
Puerto Rico	14

17th place game
14 December
China	35
Argentina	27
19th place game
14 December
Japan	44
Puerto Rico	15

==== 17–20th place semifinals ====
13 December 2015; 15:30	Japan	24–29	China	SYDBANK Arena, Kolding; Attendance: 600; Referees: Birch, Stenrand (DEN)
13 December 2015; 15:30	Fujii 14	(11–16)	Jin, Sun 7	SYDBANK Arena, Kolding; Attendance: 600; Referees: Birch, Stenrand (DEN)
13 December 2015; 15:30	3× (yellow card) 6× (suspension)	Report	4× (yellow card) 6× (suspension)	SYDBANK Arena, Kolding; Attendance: 600; Referees: Birch, Stenrand (DEN)

13 December 2015; 18:00	Argentina	28–14	Puerto Rico	SYDBANK Arena, Kolding; Attendance: 400; Referees: Coulibaly, Diabaté (CIV)
13 December 2015; 18:00	Salvadó 7	(13–6)	three players 3	SYDBANK Arena, Kolding; Attendance: 400; Referees: Coulibaly, Diabaté (CIV)
13 December 2015; 18:00	2× (yellow card) 4× (suspension)	Report	3× (yellow card) 7× (suspension)	SYDBANK Arena, Kolding; Attendance: 400; Referees: Coulibaly, Diabaté (CIV)

==== 19th place game ====
14 December 2015; 13:00	Japan	44–15	Puerto Rico	SYDBANK Arena, Kolding; Attendance: 400; Referees: Antić, Jakovljević (SRB)
14 December 2015; 13:00	Matsumura 9	(21–7)	Ceballos, García 4	SYDBANK Arena, Kolding; Attendance: 400; Referees: Antić, Jakovljević (SRB)
14 December 2015; 13:00	3× (yellow card) 4× (suspension)	Report	3× (yellow card) 3× (suspension)	SYDBANK Arena, Kolding; Attendance: 400; Referees: Antić, Jakovljević (SRB)

==== 17th place game ====
14 December 2015; 15:30	China	35–27	Argentina	SYDBANK Arena, Kolding; Attendance: 200; Referees: Alpaidze, Berezkina (RUS)
14 December 2015; 15:30	Yan 8	(20–9)	Karsten 7	SYDBANK Arena, Kolding; Attendance: 200; Referees: Alpaidze, Berezkina (RUS)
14 December 2015; 15:30	3× (yellow card) 3× (suspension)	Report	3× (yellow card)	SYDBANK Arena, Kolding; Attendance: 200; Referees: Alpaidze, Berezkina (RUS)

=== 21st–24th place playoff ===
21st–24th place semifinals
13 December
Tunisia	28
Cuba	24
13 December
DR Congo	30
Kazakhstan (Pen.)	31

21st place game
14 December
Tunisia	39
Kazakhstan	23
23rd place game
14 December
Cuba	29
DR Congo	19

==== 21st–24th place semifinals ====
13 December 2015; 15:30	Tunisia	28–24	Cuba	Jyske Bank Boxen, Herning; Attendance: 1,500; Referees: Antić, Jakovljević (SRB)
13 December 2015; 15:30	Hamrouni 7	(15–12)	Rizo 9	Jyske Bank Boxen, Herning; Attendance: 1,500; Referees: Antić, Jakovljević (SRB)
13 December 2015; 15:30	2× (yellow card) 3× (suspension)	Report	3× (yellow card) 4× (suspension)	Jyske Bank Boxen, Herning; Attendance: 1,500; Referees: Antić, Jakovljević (SRB)

13 December 2015
18:00
DR Congo
30–31
Kazakhstan
Jyske Bank Boxen, Herning
Attendance: 4,500
Referees: Schulze, Tönnies (GER)
Mwasesa 11
(12–11)
Tankina 8
2× (yellow card) 5× (suspension)
Report
4× (yellow card) 8× (suspension)

FT: 26–26 Pen: 4–5

==== 23rd place game ====
14 December 2015; 15:30	Cuba	29–19	DR Congo	Jyske Bank Boxen, Herning; Attendance: 100; Referees: Bonaventura, Bonaventura (FRA)
14 December 2015; 15:30	Rizo 8	(14–10)	Mwasesa 7	Jyske Bank Boxen, Herning; Attendance: 100; Referees: Bonaventura, Bonaventura (FRA)
14 December 2015; 15:30	2× (yellow card) 5× (suspension)	Report	2× (yellow card) 6× (suspension)	Jyske Bank Boxen, Herning; Attendance: 100; Referees: Bonaventura, Bonaventura (FRA)

==== 21st place game ====
14 December 2015; 13:00	Tunisia	39–23	Kazakhstan	Jyske Bank Boxen, Herning; Attendance: 100; Referees: Arntsen, Røen (NOR)
14 December 2015; 13:00	Hamrouni 9	(16–12)	Rodina, Tankina 5	Jyske Bank Boxen, Herning; Attendance: 100; Referees: Arntsen, Røen (NOR)
14 December 2015; 13:00	1× (yellow card) 2× (suspension)	Report	3× (yellow card) 7× (suspension)	Jyske Bank Boxen, Herning; Attendance: 100; Referees: Arntsen, Røen (NOR)

== Knockout stage ==
=== Bracket ===
Round of 16
13 December
Netherlands	36
Serbia	20
14 December
Spain	21
France	22
14 December
Poland	24
Hungary	23
14 December
Russia	30
South Korea	25
13 December
Germany	22
Norway	28
14 December
Montenegro	38
Angola	28
13 December
Denmark	26
Sweden	19
13 December
Brazil	22
Romania	25

Quarterfinals
16 December
Netherlands	28
France	25
16 December
Poland	21
Russia	20
16 December
Norway	26
Montenegro	25
16 December
Denmark	30
Romania (OT)	31

Semifinals
18 December
Netherlands	30
Poland	25
18 December
Norway (OT)	35
Romania	33

Final
20 December
Netherlands	23
Norway	31
Third place
20 December
Poland	22
Romania	31

5th place bracket

5–8th place semifinals
18 December
France	25
Russia	31
18 December
Montenegro	20
Denmark	28

Fifth place
20 December
Russia	25
Denmark	21
Seventh place
20 December
France	34
Montenegro	23

==== Round of 16 ====
13 December 2015; 20:30	Germany	22–28	Norway	Arena Nord, Frederikshavn; Attendance: 1,348; Referees: Horváth, Marton (HUN)
13 December 2015; 20:30	S. Müller, Smits 7	(10–15)	Løke 9	Arena Nord, Frederikshavn; Attendance: 1,348; Referees: Horváth, Marton (HUN)
13 December 2015; 20:30	3× (yellow card) 4× (suspension)	Report	3× (yellow card) 2× (suspension)	Arena Nord, Frederikshavn; Attendance: 1,348; Referees: Horváth, Marton (HUN)

13 December 2015; 20:30	Brazil	22–25	Romania	SYDBANK Arena, Kolding; Attendance: 1,100; Referees: García, Marín (ESP)
13 December 2015; 20:30	Rodrigues 5	(8–13)	Brădeanu 7	SYDBANK Arena, Kolding; Attendance: 1,100; Referees: García, Marín (ESP)
13 December 2015; 20:30	3× (yellow card) 4× (suspension)	Report	2× (yellow card) 4× (suspension)	SYDBANK Arena, Kolding; Attendance: 1,100; Referees: García, Marín (ESP)

13 December 2015; 20:45	Denmark	26–19	Sweden	Jyske Bank Boxen, Herning; Attendance: 12,500; Referees: Arntsen, Røen (NOR)
13 December 2015; 20:45	S. Jørgensen 6	(15–7)	Ahlm 5	Jyske Bank Boxen, Herning; Attendance: 12,500; Referees: Arntsen, Røen (NOR)
13 December 2015; 20:45	3× (yellow card) 4× (suspension)	Report	2× (yellow card) 3× (suspension)	Jyske Bank Boxen, Herning; Attendance: 12,500; Referees: Arntsen, Røen (NOR)

13 December 2015; 20:45	Netherlands	36–20	Serbia	Næstved Arena, Næstved; Attendance: 2,744; Referees: Bonaventura, Bonaventura (FRA)
13 December 2015; 20:45	Abbingh 6	(17–6)	Krpež 6	Næstved Arena, Næstved; Attendance: 2,744; Referees: Bonaventura, Bonaventura (FRA)
13 December 2015; 20:45	3× (yellow card) 6× (suspension)	Report	4× (yellow card) 4× (suspension)	Næstved Arena, Næstved; Attendance: 2,744; Referees: Bonaventura, Bonaventura (FRA)

14 December 2015; 17:45	Spain	21–22	France	SYDBANK Arena, Kolding; Attendance: 1,400; Referees: Schulze, Tönnies (GER)
14 December 2015; 17:45	Pena 7	(12–9)	Niombla 8	SYDBANK Arena, Kolding; Attendance: 1,400; Referees: Schulze, Tönnies (GER)
14 December 2015; 17:45	4× (yellow card) 8× (suspension) 1× (red card)	Report	4× (yellow card) 5× (suspension)	SYDBANK Arena, Kolding; Attendance: 1,400; Referees: Schulze, Tönnies (GER)

14 December 2015; 18:00	Poland	24–23	Hungary	Jyske Bank Boxen, Herning; Attendance: 1,230; Referees: Lah, Sok (SLO)
14 December 2015; 18:00	Kudłacz-Gloc 8	(13–14)	Hornyák, Szucsánszki 5	Jyske Bank Boxen, Herning; Attendance: 1,230; Referees: Lah, Sok (SLO)
14 December 2015; 18:00	4× (yellow card) 5× (suspension)	Report	4× (yellow card) 1× (suspension)	Jyske Bank Boxen, Herning; Attendance: 1,230; Referees: Lah, Sok (SLO)

14 December 2015; 20:30	Russia	30–25	South Korea	SYDBANK Arena, Kolding; Attendance: 1,100; Referees: Lenci, Grillo (ARG)
14 December 2015; 20:30	Akopian 6	(16–13)	Lee 7	SYDBANK Arena, Kolding; Attendance: 1,100; Referees: Lenci, Grillo (ARG)
14 December 2015; 20:30	3× (yellow card) 2× (suspension)	Report	3× (yellow card) 7× (suspension)	SYDBANK Arena, Kolding; Attendance: 1,100; Referees: Lenci, Grillo (ARG)

14 December 2015; 20:45	Montenegro	38–28	Angola	Jyske Bank Boxen, Herning; Attendance: 1,230; Referees: Koo, Lee (KOR)
14 December 2015; 20:45	Radičević 9	(19–13)	Bernardo 11	Jyske Bank Boxen, Herning; Attendance: 1,230; Referees: Koo, Lee (KOR)
14 December 2015; 20:45	3× (yellow card) 9× (suspension)	Report	2× (yellow card) 3× (suspension)	Jyske Bank Boxen, Herning; Attendance: 1,230; Referees: Koo, Lee (KOR)

==== Quarterfinals ====
16 December 2015; 17:45	Netherlands	28–25	France	SYDBANK Arena, Kolding; Attendance: 2,500; Referees: Horváth, Marton (HUN)
16 December 2015; 17:45	Polman 10	(15–12)	Pineau 8	SYDBANK Arena, Kolding; Attendance: 2,500; Referees: Horváth, Marton (HUN)
16 December 2015; 17:45	2× (yellow card) 5× (suspension)	Report	2× (yellow card) 4× (suspension)	SYDBANK Arena, Kolding; Attendance: 2,500; Referees: Horváth, Marton (HUN)

16 December 2015; 18:00	Poland	21–20	Russia	Jyske Bank Boxen, Herning; Attendance: 8,000; Referees: Arntsen, Røen (NOR)
16 December 2015; 18:00	Kobylińska 6	(11–9)	Vyakhireva 5	Jyske Bank Boxen, Herning; Attendance: 8,000; Referees: Arntsen, Røen (NOR)
16 December 2015; 18:00	3× (yellow card) 3× (suspension)	Report	2× (yellow card) 5× (suspension)	Jyske Bank Boxen, Herning; Attendance: 8,000; Referees: Arntsen, Røen (NOR)

16 December 2015; 20:30	Norway	26–25	Montenegro	SYDBANK Arena, Kolding; Attendance: 2,800; Referees: Lah, Sok (SLO)
16 December 2015; 20:30	Mørk 8	(13–11)	Mehmedović, Radičević 6	SYDBANK Arena, Kolding; Attendance: 2,800; Referees: Lah, Sok (SLO)
16 December 2015; 20:30	4× (yellow card) 8× (suspension)	Report	4× (yellow card) 4× (suspension) 1× (red card)	SYDBANK Arena, Kolding; Attendance: 2,800; Referees: Lah, Sok (SLO)

16 December 2015
20:45
Denmark
30–31 (ET)
Romania
Jyske Bank Boxen, Herning
Attendance: 12,500
Referees: Bonaventura, Bonaventura (FRA)
L. Jørgensen 6
(10–13)
Neagu 15
4× (yellow card) 5× (suspension)
Report
3× (yellow card) 5× (suspension)

FT: 27–27 ET: 3–4

==== 5–8th place semifinals ====
18 December 2015; 13:00	France	25–31	Russia	Jyske Bank Boxen, Herning; Attendance: 3,500; Referees: Koo, Lee (KOR)
18 December 2015; 13:00	Zaadi 6	(8–15)	Vyakhireva 6	Jyske Bank Boxen, Herning; Attendance: 3,500; Referees: Koo, Lee (KOR)
18 December 2015; 13:00	3× (yellow card) 7× (suspension) 1× (red card)	Report	3× (yellow card) 9× (suspension)	Jyske Bank Boxen, Herning; Attendance: 3,500; Referees: Koo, Lee (KOR)

18 December 2015; 15:30	Montenegro	20–28	Denmark	Jyske Bank Boxen, Herning; Attendance: 9,500; Referees: Horváth, Marton (HUN)
18 December 2015; 15:30	Radičević, Knežević 4	(11–15)	S. Jørgensen 8	Jyske Bank Boxen, Herning; Attendance: 9,500; Referees: Horváth, Marton (HUN)
18 December 2015; 15:30	3× (yellow card) 2× (suspension)	Report	3× (yellow card) 4× (suspension)	Jyske Bank Boxen, Herning; Attendance: 9,500; Referees: Horváth, Marton (HUN)

==== Semifinals ====
18 December 2015; 18:00	Netherlands	30–25	Poland	Jyske Bank Boxen, Herning; Attendance: 9,500; Referees: Antić, Jakovljević (SRB)
18 December 2015; 18:00	Polman 8	(15–8)	Kudłacz-Gloc 5	Jyske Bank Boxen, Herning; Attendance: 9,500; Referees: Antić, Jakovljević (SRB)
18 December 2015; 18:00	3× (yellow card) 1× (suspension)	Report	3× (yellow card) 4× (suspension)	Jyske Bank Boxen, Herning; Attendance: 9,500; Referees: Antić, Jakovljević (SRB)

18 December 2015
20:45
Norway
35–33 (ET)
Romania
Jyske Bank Boxen, Herning
Attendance: 10,200
Referees: Lah, Sok (SLO)
Mørk 8
(17–14)
Neagu 8
3× (yellow card) 4× (suspension) 1× (red card)
Report
4× (yellow card) 6× (suspension)

FT: 27–27 ET: 8–6

==== Seventh place game ====
20 December 2015; 09:45	France	34–23	Montenegro	Jyske Bank Boxen, Herning; Attendance: 1,000; Referees: Schulze, Tönnies (GER)
20 December 2015; 09:45	Ayglon, Dembélé 7	(20–13)	Radičević 7	Jyske Bank Boxen, Herning; Attendance: 1,000; Referees: Schulze, Tönnies (GER)
20 December 2015; 09:45	3× (yellow card) 4× (suspension)	Report	3× (yellow card) 4× (suspension)	Jyske Bank Boxen, Herning; Attendance: 1,000; Referees: Schulze, Tönnies (GER)

==== Fifth place game ====
20 December 2015; 12:15	Russia	25–21	Denmark	Jyske Bank Boxen, Herning; Attendance: 9,000; Referees: Lah, Sok (SLO)
20 December 2015; 12:15	Vyakhireva 7	(12–16)	S. Jørgensen 7	Jyske Bank Boxen, Herning; Attendance: 9,000; Referees: Lah, Sok (SLO)
20 December 2015; 12:15	2× (yellow card) 3× (suspension)	Report	3× (yellow card) 5× (suspension)	Jyske Bank Boxen, Herning; Attendance: 9,000; Referees: Lah, Sok (SLO)

==== Third place game ====
20 December 2015; 14:45	Poland	22–31	Romania	Jyske Bank Boxen, Herning; Attendance: 11,000; Referees: Arntsen, Røen (NOR)
20 December 2015; 14:45	Achruk 6	(8–15)	Neagu 10	Jyske Bank Boxen, Herning; Attendance: 11,000; Referees: Arntsen, Røen (NOR)
20 December 2015; 14:45	3× (yellow card) 2× (suspension)	Report	3× (yellow card) 7× (suspension)	Jyske Bank Boxen, Herning; Attendance: 11,000; Referees: Arntsen, Røen (NOR)

==== Final ====
20 December 2015; 17:15	Netherlands	23–31	Norway	Jyske Bank Boxen, Herning; Attendance: 12,500; Referees: Bonaventura, Bonaventura (FRA)
20 December 2015; 17:15	Polman 8	(9–20)	Herrem 7	Jyske Bank Boxen, Herning; Attendance: 12,500; Referees: Bonaventura, Bonaventura (FRA)
20 December 2015; 17:15	3× (yellow card) 4× (suspension)	Report	3× (yellow card) 3× (suspension)	Jyske Bank Boxen, Herning; Attendance: 12,500; Referees: Bonaventura, Bonaventura (FRA)

== Statistics ==
=== Final ranking ===
Places 9–16 were ranked according to their preliminary round results against teams that advanced to the round of 16.

Rank	Team
Gold medal	Norway
Silver medal	Netherlands
Bronze medal	Romania
4	Poland
5	Russia
6	Denmark
7	France
8	Montenegro
9	Sweden
10	Brazil
11	Hungary
12	Spain
13	Germany
14	South Korea
15	Serbia
16	Angola
17	China
18	Argentina
19	Japan
20	Puerto Rico
21	Tunisia
22	Kazakhstan
23	Cuba
24	DR Congo

Qualified for the Summer Olympics and the 2017 World Championship
Qualified for the Summer Olympics final qualification tournament

2015 Women's World Champions

Norway
Third title

Team roster: Kari Aalvik Grimsbø, Silje Solberg, Mari Molid, Veronica Kristiansen, Ida Alstad, Heidi Løke, Stine Skogrand, Vilde Ingstad, Nora Mørk, Stine Bredal Oftedal, Linn Jørum Sulland, Pernille Wibe, Betina Riegelhuth, Amanda Kurtović, Camilla Herrem, Sanna Solberg, Marta Tomac.
Head coach: Thorir Hergeirsson.

=== All Star Team ===
Position	Player
Goalkeeper	Tess Wester (NED)
Right wing	Jovanka Radičević (MNE)
Right back	Nora Mørk (NOR)
Centre back	Stine Bredal Oftedal (NOR)
Left back	Cristina Neagu (ROU)
Left wing	Valentina Ardean-Elisei (ROU)
Pivot	Heidi Løke (NOR)
Most valuable player	Cristina Neagu (ROU)

Chosen by team officials and IHF experts.

=== Top goalscorers ===
Rank	Name	Goals	Shots	%
1	(Romania) Cristina Neagu	63	104	61
2	(Montenegro) Jovanka Radičević	60	85	71
3	(Poland) Karolina Kudłacz-Gloc	52	82	63
3	(Russia) Anna Vyakhireva	52	76	68
5	(Netherlands) Estavana Polman	51	86	59
6	(Montenegro) Katarina Bulatović	49	80	61
7	(Denmark) Stine Jørgensen	48	75	64
8	(Democratic Republic of the Congo) Christianne Mwasesa	45	87	52
9	(Norway) Nora Mørk	44	76	58
10	(Angola) Natália Bernardo	43	60	72
10	(Tunisia) Mouna Chebbah	43	80	54

Source: IHF.info

=== Top goalkeepers ===
Rank	Name	%	Saves	Shots
1	(Netherlands) Tess Wester	43	120	277
2	(Spain) Darly de Paula	42	28	66
3	(Denmark) Rikke Poulsen	41	76	186
4	(Norway) Kari Aalvik Grimsbø	40	80	201
5	(Sweden) Johanna Bundsen	39	56	145
5	(Sweden) Filippa Idéhn	39	40	102
7	(Brazil) Mayssa Pessoa	38	28	74
7	(Norway) Silje Solberg	38	52	138
9	(France) Laura Glauser	36	41	113
9	(Germany) Katja Kramarczyk	36	56	155
9	(Tunisia) Nesrine Hamza	36	26	73

Source: IHF.info
