= Emma Dolan =

English boxer (born 1998)

Personal information
- Born: 21 May 1998 (age 28) Norwich, Norfolk, England
- Height: 165 cm (5 ft 5 in)
- Weight: Super-flyweight

Boxing career
- Stance: Orthodox

Boxing record
- Total fights: 11
- Wins: 9
- Win by KO: 1
- Losses: 2

Emma Dolan (born 21 May 1998) is an English professional boxer. She challenged for the IBF female super-flyweight title in 2026. Dolan was also the inaugural holder of both the British and Commonwealth female super-flyweight titles.

== Biography ==
Dolan took up boxing aged 9. Before turning professional she boxed out of Lowestoft Amateur Boxing Club and, representing England, won the British women's under 54 kg youth championship in May 2016 with victory over Scotland's Vicky Glover in Cardiff.

Dolan started her pro career with a bang by stopping Nicole Goldsmith-Ryan just 53 seconds into her debut fight in Norwich on 17 September 2021.

Having amassed a record of four wins and no defeats, Dolan uprooted from her home in Norwich, Norfolk, and moved to Newark, Nottinghamshire, in autumn 2022 after signing a three-year contract to be trained and managed by Carl Greaves.

In her first fight after the switch she became the inaugural Commonwealth female super-flyweight champion by beating Halima Vunjabei from Tanzania at Newark Showground on 25 March 2023.

Dolan made a successful first defence of her title on 6 October 2023, defeating Nicola Hopewell by unanimous decision at Park Community Arena in Sheffield.

She defended her title, and won for the inaugural British female super-flyweight championship, against Shannon Ryan at Resorts World Arena in Birmingham on 22 June 2024, winning by split decision in a contest that saw her knock her opponent to the canvas during round two. One ringside judge scored the fight 95–94 for Ryan with the other two favouring Dolan 96–94 and 96–93 respectively.

Dolan defended her British and Commonwealth titles against former European female super-flyweight champion Lauren Parker at York Hall in London on 4 April 2025. She won via unanimous decision.

She challenged IBF female super-flyweight champion Irma García at Olympia London on 5 April 2026. Dolan was sent to the canvas three times and eventually lost by technical knockout in the third round.

In a rematch of their fight from June 2024, Dolan faced Shannon Ryan at Utilita Arena in Sheffield on 24 October 2026, with her British title and her opponent's Commonwealth and IBF Intercontinental championships on the line. She was sent to the canvas twice in the first round with the referee waving the contest off after the second knockdown, awarding Ryan the win by technical knockout.

== Professional boxing record ==
11 fights	9 wins	2 losses
By knockout	1	2
By decision	8	0

No.	Result	Record	Opponent	Type	Round, time	Date	Location	Notes
11	Loss	9–2	Shannon Ryan	TKO	1 (10), 0:46	24 Oct 2026	Utilita Arena, Sheffield, England	Lost British female super-flyweight title; for Commonwealth and IBF Intercontinental female super-flyweight titles
10	Win	9–1	Antonella Shirley Molina	PTS	6	15 Aug 2026	The Nest, Notts County F.C., Nottingham, England	
9	Loss	8–1	Irma García	TKO	3 (10)	5 Apr 2026	Olympia, London, England	For IBF female super-flyweight title
8	Win	8–0	Lauren Parker	UD	10	4 Apr 2025	York Hall, London, England	Retained British and Commonwealth female super-flyweight titles
7	Win	7–0	Shannon Ryan	SD	10	22 Jun 2024	Resorts World Arena, Birmingham, England	Retained Commonwealth female super-flyweight title and won inaugural British female super-flyweight title
6	Win	6–0	Nicola Hopewell	UD	10	6 Oct 2023	Park Community Arena, Sheffield, England	Retained Commonwealth female super-flyweight title
5	Win	5–0	Halima Vunjabei	UD	10	25 Mar 2023	Newark Showground, Newark, England	Won vacant Commonwealth female super-flyweight title
4	Win	4–0	Jamillette Janitza Vallejos	PTS	6	15 Jul 2022	Holiday Inn, Norwich Airport, Norwich, England	
3	Win	3–0	Gemma Ruegg	PTS	6	18 Dec 2021	Norfolk Showground, Norwich, England	
2	Win	2–0	Klaudia Ferenczi	PTS	4	5 Nov 2021	Holiday Inn, Norwich Airport, Norwich, England	
1	Win	1–0	Nicole Goldsmith-Ryan	TKO	1 (4), 0:53	17 Sep 2021	The Halls, Norwich, England	
