= Mouna Jlezi =

Tunisian handball player (born 1991)

Personal information
- Nationality: Tunisian
- Born: 22 June 1991 (age 35)
- Height: 1.73 m (5 ft 8 in)

Sport
- Sport: Handball
- Position: Pivot
- Current club: HC Zalău
- Number: 10
National team
Years	Team	Apps	(Gls)
2015-	Tunisia	37	(63)
Medal record
African Championship
Bronze medal – third place	2021 Yaoundé
Bronze medal – third place	2024 Kinshasa
- Updated on 27 November 2025

Mouna Jlezi (born 22 June 1991) is a Tunisian handball player for Romanian club HCM Slobozia and the Tunisian national team.

She participated at the 2015 and 2017 World Women's Handball Championship.
