= Deyaneira García =

Puerto Rican handball player

Personal information
- Nationality: Puerto Rican
- Born: 5 March 1996 (age 30)
- Height: 1.64 m (5 ft 5 in)

Sport
- Sport: Handball
- Position: Pivot
- Current club: Santa Isabel Handball
National team
Years	Team	Apps	(Gls)
–	Puerto Rico	0	(0)

Deyaneira García (born 5 March 1996) is a Puerto Rican handball player who plays for the club Santa Isabel Handball. She is member of the Puerto Rican national team. She competed at the 2015 World Women's Handball Championship in Denmark.
