= Jin-sil =

Jin-sil is a Korean name. It could refer to one of the following:

- Choi Jin-sil Korean actress
- Kim Jin-sil Korean athlete
