= Nicola Hopewell =

English boxer (born 1991)

Personal information
- Nickname: Hurricane
- Born: 5 September 1991 (age 35) Worksop, Nottinghamshire, England
- Height: 160 cm (5 ft 3 in)
- Weight: Flyweight, Super-flyweight

Boxing career
- Stance: Orthodox

Boxing record
- Total fights: 10
- Wins: 8
- Win by KO: 1
- Losses: 2

Nicola Hopewell (born 5 September 1991) is an English professional boxer. She has held the IBO and Commonwealth female flyweight titles.

== Professional boxing career ==
Hopewell made her professional debut on 26 August 2022 with a sixth-round stoppage of Klaudia Ferenczi at Bramall Lane in Sheffield.

Points wins over Spain's Buchra El Quaissi and Ivanka Ivanova from Bulgaria followed before, in just her fourth fight, she unsuccessfully challenged Emma Dolan for the Commonwealth female super-flyweight title, losing by unanimous decision at Park Community Arena in Sheffield on 6 October 2023.

Hopewell returned to the ring on 3 February 2024, securing a points win against Kata Pap before moving down a weight division for a second attempt to claim a Commonwealth title this time at flyweight. The switch proved a good move as Hopewell took the vacant championship thanks to a unanimous decision victory over Gemma Ruegg at the Magna Centre in Rotherham on 20 April 2024.

She made a successful first defense of her title with a unanimous decision win over Nigerian boxer Mary Aina Abbey at Skate Central in Sheffield on 19 October 2024. All three ringside judges scored the fight 99–89.

At the same venue on 1 March 2025, Hopewell defeated Kate Radomska in a non-title bout via technical decision. Acting on the advice of the ringside doctor, the referee halted the fight in the sixth round due to a cut near Radomska's right eye caused by an accidental clash of heads. The contest was decided by the referee's scorecard up to that point with Hopewell winning 58–57.

Fighting at Skate Central in Sheffield for the third successive time, Hopewell challenged IBO female flyweight champion Marie Connan on 19 July 2025. She won the contest via split decision with two judges scoring it 96–93 and 95–94 respectively in her favour, while the third had it 96–93 for her opponent.

In her next outing, Hopewell went back up a weight division to face IBF Intercontinental female super-flyweight champion Shannon Ryan at University of Wolverhampton at The Halls in Wolverhampton on 2 May 2026, with the vacant Commonwealth female super-flyweight title also on the line. She lost the fight by stoppage in the second round when he corner threw in the towel after Ryan had knocked her to the canvas.

== Other media ==
Hopewell took part in an episode of obstacle-course based gameshow Ninja Warrior UK which aired on ITV in April 2024.

== Professional boxing record ==
| 10 fights | 8 wins | 2 losses |
|---|---|---|
| By knockout | 1 | 1 |
| By decision | 7 | 1 |

| No. | Result | Record | Opponent | Type | Round, time | Date | Location | Notes |
|---|---|---|---|---|---|---|---|---|
| 10 | Loss | 8–2 | Shannon Ryan | TKO | 2 (10), 1:01 | 2 May 2026 | University of Wolverhampton at The Halls, Wolverhampton, England | For IBF female Intercontinental title and vacant Commonwealth female super-flyweight title |
| 9 | Win | 8–1 | Marie Connan | SD | 10 | 19 July 2025 | Skate Central, Sheffield, England | Won the IBO female flyweight title |
| 8 | Win | 7–1 | Kate Radomska | TD | 6 (10) | 1 March 2025 | Skate Central, Sheffield, England | Fight stopped on doctors advice after Radomska was cut by her right eye due to an accidental clash of heads |
| 7 | Win | 6–1 | Mary Aina Abbey | UD | 10 | 19 October 2024 | Skate Central, Sheffield, England | Retained the Commonwealth female flyweight title |
| 6 | Win | 5–1 | Gemma Ruegg | UD | 10 | 20 April 2024 | Magna Centre, Rotherham, England | Won the vacant Commonwealth female flyweight title |
| 5 | Win | 4–1 | Kata Pap | PTS | 6 | 3 February 2024 | Cedar Court Hotel, Bradford, England | |
| 4 | Loss | 3–1 | Emma Dolan | UD | 10 | 6 October 2023 | Park Community Arena, Sheffield, England | For the Commonwealth female super-flyweight title |
| 3 | Win | 3–0 | Ivanka Ivanova | PTS | 6 | 10 February 2023 | Magna Centre, Rotherham, England | |
| 2 | Win | 2–0 | Buchra El Quaissi | PTS | 6 | 28 October 2022 | Doncaster Dome, Doncaster, England | |
| 1 | Win | 1–0 | Klaudia Ferenczi | TKO | 6 (6), 0:55 | 26 August 2022 | Platinum Suite, Bramall Lane Football Ground, Sheffield, England | |
