= Lauren Parker (boxer) =

English boxer (born 1991)

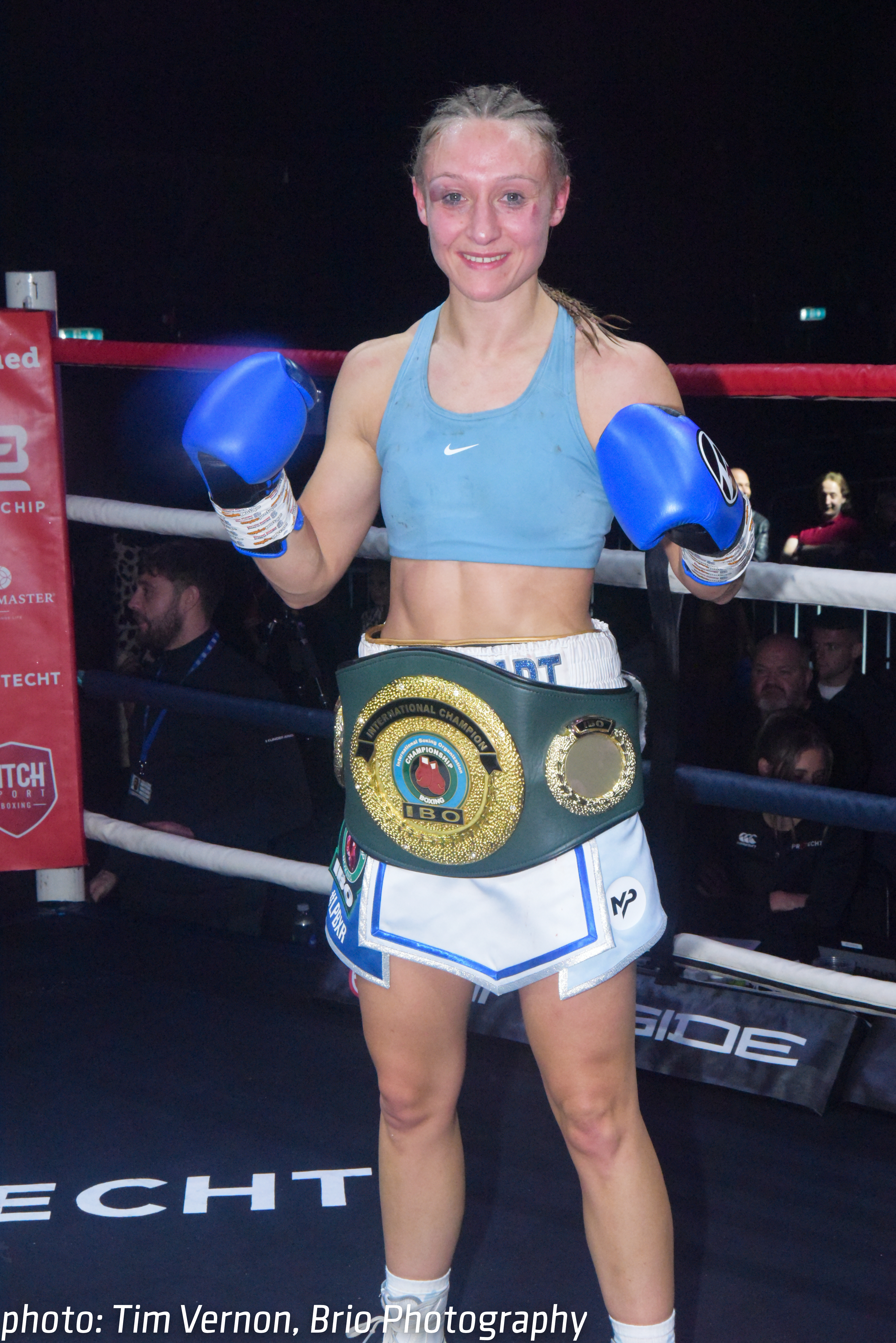

Personal information
- Nickname: Lionheart
- Nationality: English
- Born: 5 June 1991 (age 35) Hertfordshire, England
- Weight: Super-flyweight

Boxing career
- Stance: Orthodox

Boxing record
- Total fights: 13
- Wins: 10
- Win by KO: 2
- Losses: 2
- Draws: 1

Lauren Parker (born 5 June 1991) is an English professional boxer who is a former European female super-flyweight champion.

== Career ==
Parker made her professional boxing debut on 20 May 2018 at Corn Exchange in Bedford with a points win over Teodora Hristova in a four-round contest.

She beat Mexico's Edna Maltos by unanimous decision to claim the vacant IBO female intercontinental super-flyweight belt at Rotherham's Magna Centre on 7 October 2022.

In February 2023, Parker underwent spinal surgery for a career threatening back issue.

After recovering, Parker returned to the ring at York Hall in London on 2 December 2023 where she defeated Italy's Giuseppina Di Stefano to win the vacant European female super-flyweight title.

Returning to York Hall on 7 December 2024, she defeated Kira Carter by stoppage in the third round of their scheduled six-round contest.

After having to vacate her European title due to being unable to defend it, Parker challenged British and Commonwealth female super-flyweight champion Emma Dolan at York Hall on 4 April 2025. She lost via unanimous decision.

== Professional boxing record ==
13 fights	10 wins	2 losses
By knockout	2	0
By decision	8	2
Draws	1	

No.	Result	Record	Opponent	Type	Round, time	Date	Location	Notes
13	Loss	10–2–1	Emma Dolan	UD	10	4 April 2025	York Hall, London, England	For the British and Commonwealth female super-flyweight titles
12	Win	10–1–1	Kira Carter	TKO	(3) 6	7 December 2024	York Hall, London, England	
11	Win	9–1–1	Jamillette Janitza Vallejos	PTS	6	8 June 2024	York Hall, London, England	
10	Win	8–1–1	Giuseppina Di Stefano	UD	10	2 December 2023	York Hall, London, England	Won the vacant European female super-flyweight title
9	Win	7–1–1	Edna Maltos	UD	10	7 October 2022	Magna Centre, Rotherham, England	Won the vacant IBO female intercontinental super-flyweight title
8	Win	6–1–1	Augustina Marisa Belen Rojas	PTS	6	29 April 2022	Double Tree Hilton Hotel, Sheffield, England	
7	Win	5–1–1	Ivanka Ivanova	TKO	2 (4)	26 November 2021	Double Tree Hilton Hotel, Sheffield, England	
6	Win	4–1–1	Roz Mari Silyanova	PTS	4	8 December 2019	Corn Exchange, Bedford, England	
5	Win	3–1–1	Klaudia Ferenczi	PTS	4	19 October 2019	Corn Exchange, Bedford, England	
4	Draw	2–1–1	Buchra El Quaissi	PTS	4	14 July 2019	Corn Exchange, Bedford, England	
3	Loss	2–1–0	Dani Hodges	PTS	4	16 March 2019	Corn Exchange, Bedford, England	
2	Win	2–0–0	Roz Mari Silyanova	PTS	4	10 November 2018	Corn Exchange, Bedford, England	
1	Win	1–0–0	Teodora Hristova	PTS	4	20 May 2018	Corn Exchange, Bedford, England	
