= Laura Moisă =

Romanian handball player (born 1989)

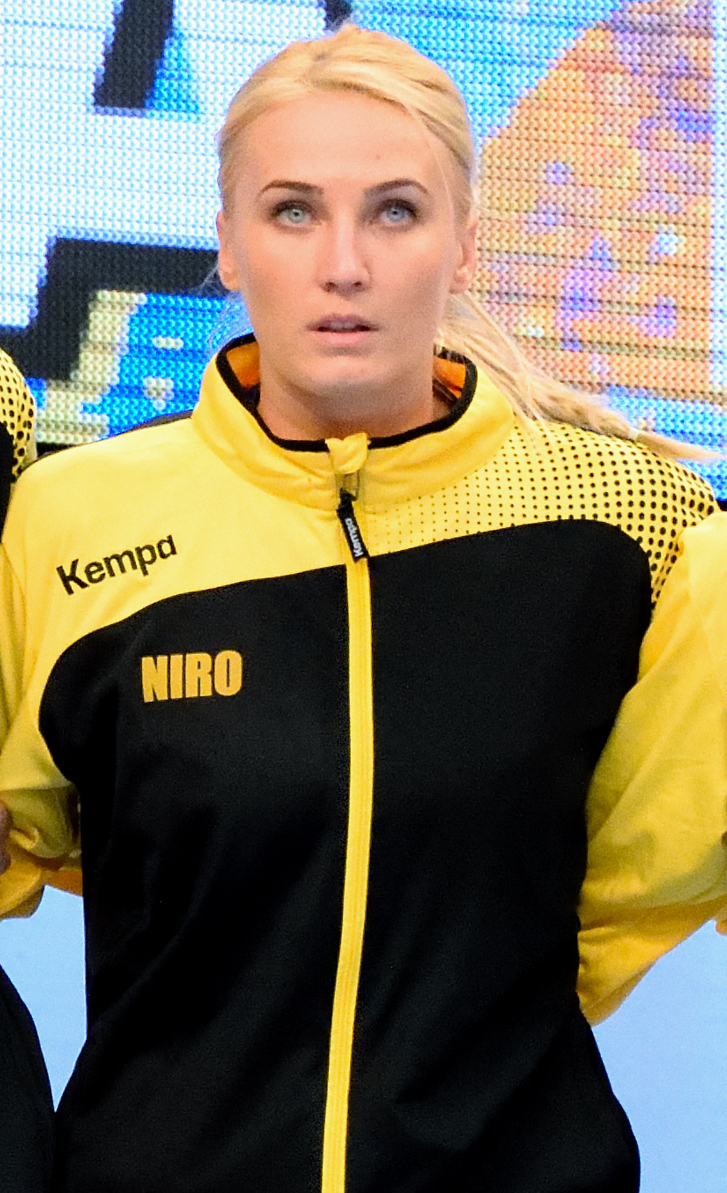

Personal information
- Nationality: Romanian
- Born: 21 August 1989 (age 37) Bacău, Romania
- Height: 1.73 m (5 ft 8 in)

Sport
- Sport: Handball
- Position: Right wing
- Current club: Retired
- Number: 89

Senior clubs
- Years: Team
- –2011: CS Știința Bacău
- 2011–2019: Corona Brașov
- 2019–2021: CSM București
- 2021-2022: CS Gloria 2018 Bistrița-Năsăud
National team
Years	Team	Apps	(Gls)
2010–	Romania	81	(92)
Medal record
World Championship
Bronze medal – third place	2015 Denmark

Laura Moisă (née Chiper; born 21 August 1989) is a retired Romanian handballer who played for Romanian national team.

== Achievements ==
- Liga Naţională:
  - Silver Medalist: 2014
  - Bronze Medalist: 2015, 2016
- Cupa României:
  - Finalist: 2013
- EHF Cup:
  - Semifinalist: 2015
- World Championship:
  - Bronze Medalist: 2015

== Awards ==
- Cupa României Best Scorer: 2013
