= Chloe Watson (boxer) =

English boxer (born 2000)

Personal information
- Born: Chloe Louise Watson; 13 January 2000 (age 26) Birkenhead, Merseyside, England
- Height: 165 cm (5 ft 5 in)
- Weight: Flyweight, Super-flyweight

Boxing career
- Stance: Orthodox

Boxing record
- Total fights: 12
- Wins: 9
- Win by KO: 1
- Losses: 3

Chloe Watson (born 13 January 2000) is an English professional boxer. She is a former European female flyweight champion.

== Amateur career ==
Fighting for Birkenhead Venture Boxing Club, Watson became England Amateur Boxing Association national schools champion in the Class One 40–42 kg category shortly before her 14th birthday.

She went on to capture the England Boxing Youth national 51 kg title in March 2017 before becoming England's first ever women's boxing Commonwealth Youth Games medalist by winning gold in the 51 kg category at the event in the Bahamas in July the same year.

In April 2019, Watson lost in the England Boxing national championship elite under 51 kg final to Tori-Ellis Willetts.

== Professional career ==
Watson joined the professional boxing ranks in July 2021, signing a promotional deal with Wasserman Boxing.

Trained by International Boxing Hall of Fame inductee and former world champion, Ricky Hatton, she made her pro debut on 25 November 2021 at York Hall in London with a points win over Judit Hachbold.

Having gone undefeated in her first six fights, Watson took on France's Justine Lallemand for the vacant European female flyweight title in a contest held at the Toughsheet Community Stadium in Bolton on 1 December 2023, claiming the belt by unanimous decision.

She made the first defense of her title against Jasmina Zapotoczna on an all-female card, headlined by a welterweight world title unification fight between Natasha Jonas and Lauren Price, at the Royal Albert Hall in London on 7 March 2025. Watson lost via split decision with one of the ringside judges scoring the contest 97–93 in her favour, but being overruled by his two colleagues who both had it 96–95 for Zapotoczna.

Watson made her return to the ring against Shannon Ryan at York Hall in London on 17 October 2025 with the vacant IBF female Intercontinental super-flyweight title on the line. She lost by unanimous technical decision after being behind on all three judges' scorecards when the bout was stopped following the fourth round due to an eye injury she sustained as a result of an accidental clash of heads.

== Personal life ==
Watson has a twin brother named Curtis and is a supporter of Everton.

== Professional boxing record ==
12 fights	9 wins	3 losses
By knockout	1	0
By decision	8	3

No.	Result	Record	Opponent	Type	Round, time	Date	Location	Notes
12	Loss	9–3	Teresa Makinen	PTS	8	2026-04-5	Olympia, London, England	
11	Win	9–2	Klaudia Ferenczi	TKO	2 (6), 0:45	2025-12-7	Grand Central Hall, Liverpool, England	
10	Loss	8–2	Shannon Ryan	UTD	4 (10)	2025-10-17	York Hall, London, England	For the vacant IBF female Intercontinental super-flyweight title
9	Loss	8–1	Jasmina Zapotoczna	SD	10	2025-03-07	Royal Albert Hall, London, England	Lost the European female flyweight title
8	Win	8–0	Kate Radomska	PTS	6	2024-06-14	Bolton Whites Hotel, Bolton, England	
7	Win	7–0	Justine Lellemand	UD	10	2023-12-01	Toughsheet Community Stadium, Bolton, England	Won the vacant European female flyweight title
6	Win	6–0	Laura Belen Valdebenito	PTS	8	2023-07-15	Vertu Motors Arena, Newcastle, England	
5	Win	5–0	Romina Gisel Sosa	PTS	4	2023-03-24	Bolton Whites Hotel, Bolton, England	
4	Win	4–0	Minerva Gutierrez	PTS	6	2022-11-25	York Hall, London, England	
3	Win	3–0	Fara El Bousairi	PTS	6	2022-06-17	Echo Arena, Liverpool, England	
2	Win	2–0	Gemma Ruegg	PTS	4	2022-04-02	Newcastle Arena, Newcastle, England	
1	Win	1–0	Judith Hachbold	PTS	4	2021-11-25	York Hall, London, England	
