= Nesrine Hamza =

Tunisian handball player

Personal information
- Nationality: Tunisian
- Born: 23 October 1993 (age 32) Tunis, Tunisia
- Height: 1.74 m (5 ft 9 in)

Sport
- Sport: Handball
- Position: Goalkeeper
- Current club: ASF Mahdia
National team
Years	Team	Apps	(Gls)
–	Tunisia	30	(0)

Nesrine Hamza (born 23 October 1993) is a Tunisian handball player for ASF Mahdia and the Tunisian national team.

She participated at the 2015 World Women's Handball Championship.
