= Livia Veranes =

Cuban handball player (born 1993)

Personal information
- Nationality: Cuban
- Born: 14 September 1993 (age 33)
- Height: 1.72 m (5 ft 8 in)

Sport
- Sport: Handball
- Position: Left wing
- Current club: Santiago de Cuba
National team
Years	Team	Apps	(Gls)
–	Cuba	26	(37)
Medal record
Pan American Championship
Silver medal – second place	2015 Cuba

Livia Veranes (born 14 September 1993) is a Cuban handball player. She plays for the club Santiago de Cuba and is member of the Cuban national team. She competed at the 2015 World Women's Handball Championship in Denmark.
