= Vicky Glover =

Scottish boxer

Personal information
- Nationality: Scottish
- Born: 16 May 1999 (age 27) Glasgow, Scotland
- Height: 160 cm (5 ft 3 in)

Sport
- Sport: Boxing
- Weight class: Featherweight
Medal record
Women's amateur boxing
Representing Scotland
European Boxing Confederation Under-22 Championships
Bronze medal – third place	2019 European Boxing Confederation Under-22 Championships	Featherweight

Vicky Glover is a former boxer who was the first woman to represent Scotland in boxing at a Commonwealth Games.

== Early life ==
Glover had a difficult childhood. At the age of ten, her father enrolled her into a boxing club to help her overcome her difficulties through the discipline and routine that boxing provided. She was involved with community services from a young age; such as Social Workers and Children’s Hearing Systems to encourage her to become engaged with her schooling and prevent any further negative behaviours that Glover described as “hassle.”

== Boxing career ==
Glover won the British women's under 54 kg youth championship in April 2017 defeating England's Maisey Rose Courtney in the final. In July 2017 she pleaded guilty to assault after attacking two men with a baseball bat and was ordered to complete 200 hours of community work within nine months and placed under 18 months of supervision. Later in 2017 she was the first female boxer to be selected to represent Scotland at the Commonwealth Games when she was named in the team for the 2018 edition in Australia. Competing at the event in April 2018 she lost in the quarter-finals to Canada's Sabrina Aubin. She represented Scotland at the 2018 Women’s World Championship going out in the preliminaries to Germany's Ornella Wahner. Glover made further Scottish boxing history in March 2019 when she won a bronze medal in the featherweight category at the European Boxing Confederation Under-22 championships in Russia losing in the semi-finals to England's Ellie Scotney by unanimous decision.

== Post-boxing ==
In 2023 Glover was convicted of assault stemming from a dispute over drugs and was sentenced to a five month electronic tagging order confining her to her home between 7pm and 7am each day.
