= Gemma Ruegg =

British female boxer

Personal information
- Nickname: The Rebel
- Nationality: British
- Born: December 24, 1984 (age 41) Bournemouth, Dorset
- Height: 5 ft 4 in (163 cm)
- Weight: Super flyweight

Boxing career

Boxing record
- Total fights: 25
- Wins: 8
- Losses: 16
- Draws: 1

Gemma Louise Ruegg (born December 24, 1984), also known as Gemma Hewitt, is a British female boxer and business owner from Bournemouth, Dorset.

After suffering mental health difficulties and alcohol addiction in her youth, she took up sport on the advice of her family doctor. She went on to become the first female boxing champion at two weight classes in the QBL after winning the regional welterweight title, ten weeks after giving birth to her sixth child.

Her trainer is husband Danny Ruegg, and her step-son Mace is also a professional boxer.

In 2016 she formed the fitness apparel clothing brand Combat Dollies, where she serves as director.

In November 2024, Ruegg became the Commonwealth Super Flyweight Silver Belt Champion, marking a significant milestone in her boxing career. Beyond her accomplishments in the ring, Ruegg is a passionate mental health advocate. She uses her experiences with mental health struggles to inspire others as a speaker. Ruegg has shared her journey at various organizations, including Numatic and Screwfix, emphasizing how fitness became a vital tool for her recovery and wellness. Through her advocacy, she aims to raise awareness and support for mental health issues, encouraging individuals to prioritize their well-being.

== Early life ==
From the age of 16, Ruegg had an alcohol addiction and suffered with depression and self-harm. When the family doctor advised her to join a gym, Ruegg took up boxing as a source of focus, it turned her life around. She said:

My doctor kept saying: 'join a gym, it will do you a world of good'. I think now he probably meant a Fitness First type gym but I joined a boxing gym instead. Before I joined the boxing gym, my life was on the way to a train wreck… I was lost. Boxing gave me goals. It's given me something to be good at. I don't think I would have found what I found in boxing anywhere else.

She married Danny Ruegg in 2016 and has seven children; she also has 5 step-children. Following her doctor's guidelines, she trained throughout her pregnancy and regularly takes her children with her to the gym.

== Career ==
=== Mixed Martial Arts ===
Ruegg had two professional bouts as a bantamweight fighter, and one amateur bout, both with promoter House of Pain.

3 fights	1 win	2 losses
Draws	0	

Result	Opponent	Type	Round, time	Date	Location	Status
Loss	Agnieszka Niedzwiedz	Submission (Triangle Choke)	1, 3:59	Apr 12, 2014	Cage Warriors 67, Swansea, Wales	Professional
Win	Chloe Hinchliffe	TKO (Punches)	1, 3:56	Nov 9, 2013	Shock N Awe 15	Professional
Loss	Rute Frias	Decision (unanimous)	3, 3:00	Sep 22, 2013	British Challenge MMA 4	Amateur

=== Pro Boxing ===
After winning two regional titles in two different weight categories at the Queensbury Boxing League, Ruegg was granted her professional licence in June 2021. She signed with Dorset boxing promoter Steve Bendall, at SK4 Promotions.

25 fights	8 wins	16 losses
By knockout	1	0
By decision	7	16
Draws	1	

Result	Opponent	Type	Date	Location
Win	Claudia Ferenczi	PTS	Apr 30, 2022	Civic Hall, Grays
Loss	Chloe Watson	PTS	Apr 2, 2022	Newcastle Arena, Newcastle
Loss	Emma Dolan	PTS	Dec 18, 2021	Norfolk Showground, Norwich
Loss	Tysie Gallagher	PTS	Nov 26, 2021	DoubleTree by Hilton Hotel (formerly Park Hotel), Sheffield
Win	Claudia Ferenczi	PTS	Oct 22, 2021	Central Hall, Southampton

== Combat Dollies ==
In 2016, Ruegg set up the fitness apparel clothing brand Combat Dollies. She stated:

When I first started training in the gym I couldn't find any clothing that fitted. It was either too baggy, like men's clothing, or too tight and not flexible enough for women to wear. So I made clothes that I was happy to wear at the gym. Then I made some for my friends and then their friends and it grew from there."

Her gymwear has been featured in the 28th season of the TV show The Ultimate Fighter, worn by Invicta fighting champion MMA fighter Pannie Kianzad.

She is the sole director of the company.
