= Sydbank Arena =

Sports arena in Kolding, Denmark

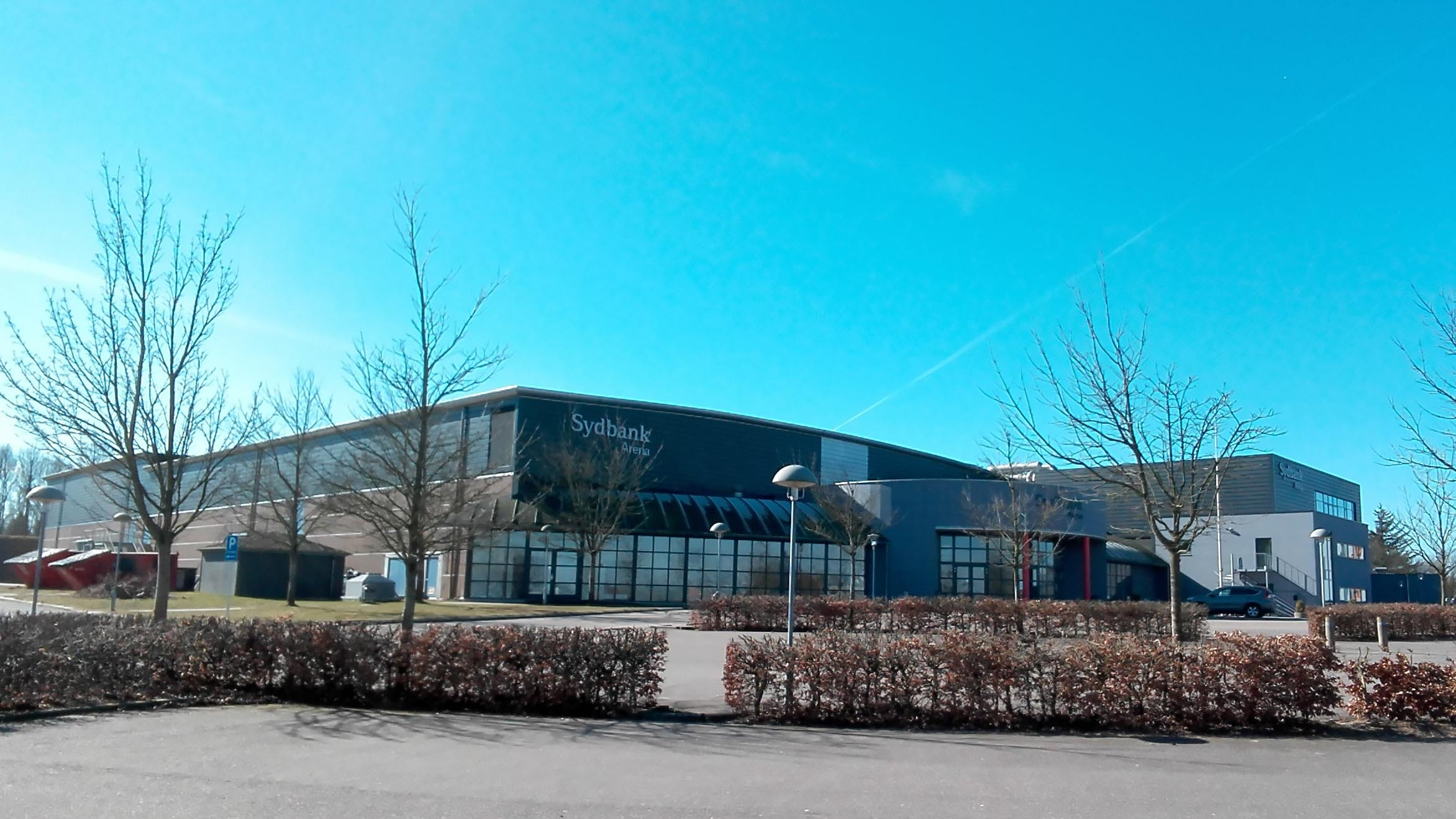
- Sydbank Arena in January 2018
- Interactive map of Sydbank Arena
- Former names: Kolding Hallerne (1996–2015); Tre-For Arena
- Location: Kolding, Denmark
- Coordinates: 55°27′52″N 9°28′38″E
- Owner: Kolding Municipality
- Capacity: 5,200 (main hall)

Construction
- Opened: 1996
- Renovated: 2015
- Expanded: 2015

Tenant
- KIF Kolding

Sydbank Arena (formerly known as Kolding Hallerne and Tre-For Arena) is an indoor sports arena in Kolding, Denmark primarily used for handball. The arena has a capacity of 5,001 spectators and is home to Danish Handball League team KIF Kolding, one of the most successful teams in the history of Danish handball.

== History ==
It was built in 1996 and expanded in 2015. It represents the largest part of the hall complex The complex is located in the southern part of Kolding and consists of 3 sports halls, 5 handball courts, 10 bowling alleys, meeting facilities, hotel and a restaurant.

In December 2015, the venue was used for the 2015 World Women's Handball Championship. In December 2020 the venue was used for the 2020 European Women's Handball Championship.

== See also ==
- List of indoor arenas in Denmark
- List of indoor arenas in Nordic countries
