= 2016–17 Women's EHF Champions League group stage =

This article describes the group stage of the 2016–17 Women's EHF Champions League.

== Draw ==
The draw was held on 1 July 2016 at 13:00 in Vienna, Austria.

=== Seedings ===
The seedings were announced on 27 June 2016.

Pot 1	Pot 2	Pot 3	Pot 4
(Montenegro) Budućnost (Hungary) Győri Audi ETO KC (North Macedonia) HC Vardar (Norway) Larvik HK	(Romania) CSM Bucharest (Denmark) Team Esbjerg (Russia) HC Astrakhanochka (Germany) Thüringer HC	(Sweden) IK Sävehof (France) Metz Handball (Hungary) FTC-Rail Cargo Hungaria (Denmark) Midtjylland	(Russia) Rostov-Don (Norway) Glassverket IF (Germany) HC Leipzig (Slovenia) Krim

^{†} Winners of the qualifying round whose identity was not known at the time of the draw.

== Groups ==
The matchdays were 14–16 October, 21–23 October, 28–30 October, 4–6 November, 11–13 November, 18–20 November 2016.

=== Group A ===
Pos	Team	Pld	W	D	L	GF	GA	GD	Pts	Qualification
1	(Montenegro) Budućnost	6	5	0	1	158	136	+22	10	Main round
2	(France) Metz Handball	6	4	0	2	146	133	+13	8	Main round
3	(Germany) Thüringer HC	6	3	0	3	148	153	−5	6	Main round
4	(Norway) Glassverket IF	6	0	0	6	128	158	−30	0	

Source: EHF
Rules for classification: Tiebreakers

15 October 2016; 17:00	Budućnost (Montenegro)	21–19	(France) Metz Handball	Morača Sports Center, Podgorica; Attendance: 1,800; Referees: Năstase, Stancu (ROU)
15 October 2016; 17:00	Bulatović 10	(11–10)	three players 3	Morača Sports Center, Podgorica; Attendance: 1,800; Referees: Năstase, Stancu (ROU)
15 October 2016; 17:00	3× (yellow card) 2× (suspension)	Report	2× (yellow card) 2× (suspension)	Morača Sports Center, Podgorica; Attendance: 1,800; Referees: Năstase, Stancu (ROU)

16 October 2016; 14:00	Thüringer HC (Germany)	24–16	(Norway) Glassverket IF	Wiedigsburghalle, Nordhausen; Attendance: 1,300; Referees: Praštalo, Todorović (BIH)
16 October 2016; 14:00	Luzumová, Pintea 4	(10–4)	Christensen 8	Wiedigsburghalle, Nordhausen; Attendance: 1,300; Referees: Praštalo, Todorović (BIH)
16 October 2016; 14:00	2× (yellow card) 5× (suspension) 1× (red card)	Report	3× (yellow card) 6× (suspension)	Wiedigsburghalle, Nordhausen; Attendance: 1,300; Referees: Praštalo, Todorović (BIH)

22 October 2016; 18:30	Metz Handball (France)	25–18	(Germany) Thüringer HC	Arènes de Metz, Metz; Attendance: 3,623; Referees: Marić, Mašić (SRB)
22 October 2016; 18:30	Gros, Smits 6	(11–10)	Niederwieser 4	Arènes de Metz, Metz; Attendance: 3,623; Referees: Marić, Mašić (SRB)
22 October 2016; 18:30	3× (yellow card) 1× (suspension)	Report	3× (yellow card) 1× (suspension)	Arènes de Metz, Metz; Attendance: 3,623; Referees: Marić, Mašić (SRB)

22 October 2016; 18:30	Glassverket IF (Norway)	23–30	(Montenegro) Budućnost	Drammenshallen, Drammen; Attendance: 1,155; Referees: Vranes, Wenninger (AUT)
22 October 2016; 18:30	Haraldsdóttir 11	(11–13)	Jauković 5	Drammenshallen, Drammen; Attendance: 1,155; Referees: Vranes, Wenninger (AUT)
22 October 2016; 18:30	3× (yellow card) 4× (suspension) 1× (red card)	Report	3× (yellow card) 5× (suspension)	Drammenshallen, Drammen; Attendance: 1,155; Referees: Vranes, Wenninger (AUT)

30 October 2016; 14:00	Thüringer HC (Germany)	26–32	(Montenegro) Budućnost	Wiedigsburghalle, Nordhausen; Attendance: 1,500; Referees: Erdoğan, Özdeniz (TUR)
30 October 2016; 14:00	Luzumová 8	(11–21)	Neagu 8	Wiedigsburghalle, Nordhausen; Attendance: 1,500; Referees: Erdoğan, Özdeniz (TUR)
30 October 2016; 14:00	3× (yellow card) 1× (suspension)	Report	2× (yellow card) 2× (suspension)	Wiedigsburghalle, Nordhausen; Attendance: 1,500; Referees: Erdoğan, Özdeniz (TUR)

30 October 2016; 15:00	Glassverket IF (Norway)	22–24	(France) Metz Handball	Reistad Arena, Lier; Attendance: 570; Referees: Alpaidze, Berezkina (RUS)
30 October 2016; 15:00	Bjørnsen, Christensen 4	(8–15)	Gros 7	Reistad Arena, Lier; Attendance: 570; Referees: Alpaidze, Berezkina (RUS)
30 October 2016; 15:00	2× (yellow card) 7× (suspension)	Report	2× (yellow card) 4× (suspension)	Reistad Arena, Lier; Attendance: 570; Referees: Alpaidze, Berezkina (RUS)

5 November 2016; 16:30	Metz Handball (France)	25–19	(Norway) Glassverket IF	Arènes de Metz, Metz; Attendance: 3,460; Referees: Florescu, Stoia (ROU)
5 November 2016; 16:30	Luciano 8	(12–10)	Bjørnsen 6	Arènes de Metz, Metz; Attendance: 3,460; Referees: Florescu, Stoia (ROU)
5 November 2016; 16:30	3× (yellow card) 2× (suspension)	Report	3× (yellow card) 2× (suspension)	Arènes de Metz, Metz; Attendance: 3,460; Referees: Florescu, Stoia (ROU)

6 November 2016; 17:00	Budućnost (Montenegro)	28–19	(Germany) Thüringer HC	Morača Sports Center, Podgorica; Attendance: 3,200; Referees: Christiansen, Hansen (DEN)
6 November 2016; 17:00	Bulatović 6	(17–8)	Schmelzer 4	Morača Sports Center, Podgorica; Attendance: 3,200; Referees: Christiansen, Hansen (DEN)
6 November 2016; 17:00	3× (yellow card) 4× (suspension)	Report	3× (yellow card) 3× (suspension)	Morača Sports Center, Podgorica; Attendance: 3,200; Referees: Christiansen, Hansen (DEN)

11 November 2016; 19:00	Metz Handball (France)	28–25	(Montenegro) Budućnost	Arènes de Metz, Metz; Attendance: 4,656; Referees: Bonifert, Oláh (HUN)
11 November 2016; 19:00	Pop-Lazić 8	(14–16)	Bulatović 7	Arènes de Metz, Metz; Attendance: 4,656; Referees: Bonifert, Oláh (HUN)
11 November 2016; 19:00	2× (yellow card) 2× (suspension)	Report	3× (yellow card) 8× (suspension) 1× (red card)	Arènes de Metz, Metz; Attendance: 4,656; Referees: Bonifert, Oláh (HUN)

13 November 2016; 16:45	Glassverket IF (Norway)	27–33	(Germany) Thüringer HC	Drammenshallen, Drammen; Attendance: 437; Referees: Pech, Vagvölgyi (HUN)
13 November 2016; 16:45	Haraldsdóttir 7	(12–15)	Luzumová, Niederwieser 6	Drammenshallen, Drammen; Attendance: 437; Referees: Pech, Vagvölgyi (HUN)
13 November 2016; 16:45	2× (yellow card) 3× (suspension)	Report	3× (yellow card) 4× (suspension)	Drammenshallen, Drammen; Attendance: 437; Referees: Pech, Vagvölgyi (HUN)

18 November 2016; 19:00	Budućnost (Montenegro)	22–21	(Norway) Glassverket IF	Morača Sports Center, Podgorica; Attendance: 1,500; Referees: Kijauskaitė, Žalienė (LTU)
18 November 2016; 19:00	Jauković 6	(14–9)	Christensen, Wolff 4	Morača Sports Center, Podgorica; Attendance: 1,500; Referees: Kijauskaitė, Žalienė (LTU)
18 November 2016; 19:00	3× (yellow card) 3× (suspension)	Report	2× (yellow card)	Morača Sports Center, Podgorica; Attendance: 1,500; Referees: Kijauskaitė, Žalienė (LTU)

19 November 2016; 14:00	Thüringer HC (Germany)	28–25	(France) Metz Handball	Wiedigsburghalle, Nordhausen; Attendance: 1,700; Referees: Kurtagic, Wetterwik (SWE)
19 November 2016; 14:00	Houette 7	(15–11)	Gros 7	Wiedigsburghalle, Nordhausen; Attendance: 1,700; Referees: Kurtagic, Wetterwik (SWE)
19 November 2016; 14:00	2× (yellow card) 5× (suspension) 1× (red card)	Report	3× (yellow card) 3× (suspension) 1× (red card)	Wiedigsburghalle, Nordhausen; Attendance: 1,700; Referees: Kurtagic, Wetterwik (SWE)

=== Group B ===
Pos	Team	Pld	W	D	L	GF	GA	GD	Pts	Qualification
1	(North Macedonia) HC Vardar	6	5	1	0	220	148	+72	11	Main round
2	(Hungary) FTC-Rail Cargo Hungaria	6	4	1	1	172	154	+18	9	Main round
3	(Russia) HC Astrakhanochka	6	1	0	5	156	189	−33	2 (Note: Astrakhanochka 54–54 Leipzig, Astrakhanochka advanced on away goals.)	Main round
4	(Germany) HC Leipzig	6	1	0	5	139	196	−57	2	

Source: EHF
Rules for classification: Tiebreakers
Notes:

14 October 2016; 20:30	HC Vardar (North Macedonia)	27–27	(Hungary) FTC-Rail Cargo Hungaria	Jane Sandanski Arena, Skopje; Attendance: 4,300; Referees: Alpaidze, Berezkina (RUS)
14 October 2016; 20:30	Penezić 8	(17–14)	Kovacsics, Szucsánszki 7	Jane Sandanski Arena, Skopje; Attendance: 4,300; Referees: Alpaidze, Berezkina (RUS)
14 October 2016; 20:30	2× (yellow card) 3× (suspension)	Report	3× (yellow card) 7× (suspension) 1× (red card)	Jane Sandanski Arena, Skopje; Attendance: 4,300; Referees: Alpaidze, Berezkina (RUS)

15 October 2016; 16:00	HC Astrakhanochka (Russia)	27–24	(Germany) HC Leipzig	Sportcomplex Zvezdny, Astrakhan; Attendance: 3,000; Referees: Panayides, Andreou (CYP)
15 October 2016; 16:00	Sisenova 7	(13–9)	Kudłacz-Gloc 7	Sportcomplex Zvezdny, Astrakhan; Attendance: 3,000; Referees: Panayides, Andreou (CYP)
15 October 2016; 16:00	3× (yellow card) 3× (suspension)	Report	3× (yellow card) 5× (suspension)	Sportcomplex Zvezdny, Astrakhan; Attendance: 3,000; Referees: Panayides, Andreou (CYP)

21 October 2016; 20:30	HC Vardar (North Macedonia)	41–24	(Germany) HC Leipzig	Jane Sandanski Arena, Skopje; Attendance: 3,500; Referees: Kurtagic, Wetterwik (SWE)
21 October 2016; 20:30	Radičević 6	(19–14)	Hubinger, Minevskaja 5	Jane Sandanski Arena, Skopje; Attendance: 3,500; Referees: Kurtagic, Wetterwik (SWE)
21 October 2016; 20:30	3× (yellow card) 2× (suspension)	Report	3× (yellow card) 5× (suspension)	Jane Sandanski Arena, Skopje; Attendance: 3,500; Referees: Kurtagic, Wetterwik (SWE)

23 October 2016; 15:00	FTC-Rail Cargo Hungaria (Hungary)	32–23	(Russia) HC Astrakhanochka	OBO Aréna, Dabas; Attendance: 2,000; Referees: Bonaventura, Bonaventura (FRA)
23 October 2016; 15:00	Pena 8	(15–10)	Sabirova 8	OBO Aréna, Dabas; Attendance: 2,000; Referees: Bonaventura, Bonaventura (FRA)
23 October 2016; 15:00	3× (yellow card) 3× (suspension)	Report	2× (yellow card) 6× (suspension)	OBO Aréna, Dabas; Attendance: 2,000; Referees: Bonaventura, Bonaventura (FRA)

29 October 2016; 17:00	HC Astrakhanochka (Russia)	26–31	(North Macedonia) HC Vardar	Sportcomplex Zvezdny, Astrakhan; Attendance: 3,000; Referees: Kijauskaitė, Žalienė (LTU)
29 October 2016; 17:00	Sabirova 8	(13–14)	Penezić 10	Sportcomplex Zvezdny, Astrakhan; Attendance: 3,000; Referees: Kijauskaitė, Žalienė (LTU)
29 October 2016; 17:00	3× (yellow card) 4× (suspension)	Report	4× (yellow card) 4× (suspension)	Sportcomplex Zvezdny, Astrakhan; Attendance: 3,000; Referees: Kijauskaitė, Žalienė (LTU)

29 October 2016; 17:00	FTC-Rail Cargo Hungaria (Hungary)	26–22	(Germany) HC Leipzig	OBO Aréna, Dabas; Attendance: 1,800; Referees: Praštalo, Todorović (BIH)
29 October 2016; 17:00	Lukács 8	(12–11)	Hubinger 5	OBO Aréna, Dabas; Attendance: 1,800; Referees: Praštalo, Todorović (BIH)
29 October 2016; 17:00	2× (yellow card) 1× (suspension)	Report	4× (yellow card) 7× (suspension) 1× (red card)	OBO Aréna, Dabas; Attendance: 1,800; Referees: Praštalo, Todorović (BIH)

5 November 2016; 17:30	HC Vardar (North Macedonia)	39–25	(Russia) HC Astrakhanochka	Jane Sandanski Arena, Skopje; Attendance: 3,500; Referees: Antić, Jakovljević (SRB)
5 November 2016; 17:30	Radičević 9	(18–13)	Kozhokar 7	Jane Sandanski Arena, Skopje; Attendance: 3,500; Referees: Antić, Jakovljević (SRB)
5 November 2016; 17:30	3× (yellow card)	Report	2× (yellow card) 3× (suspension)	Jane Sandanski Arena, Skopje; Attendance: 3,500; Referees: Antić, Jakovljević (SRB)

6 November 2016; 19:00	HC Leipzig (Germany)	17–30	(Hungary) FTC-Rail Cargo Hungaria	Arena Leipzig, Leipzig; Attendance: 1,869; Referees: Arntsen, Røen (NOR)
6 November 2016; 19:00	Hubinger 7	(8–14)	Szucsánszki 7	Arena Leipzig, Leipzig; Attendance: 1,869; Referees: Arntsen, Røen (NOR)
6 November 2016; 19:00	2× (yellow card) 2× (suspension)	Report	3× (yellow card) 2× (suspension)	Arena Leipzig, Leipzig; Attendance: 1,869; Referees: Arntsen, Røen (NOR)

13 November 2016; 14:00	HC Leipzig (Germany)	30–27	(Russia) HC Astrakhanochka	Arena Leipzig, Leipzig; Attendance: 1,490; Referees: Brehmer, Skowronek (POL)
13 November 2016; 14:00	Hubinger 9	(14–14)	Sabirova 9	Arena Leipzig, Leipzig; Attendance: 1,490; Referees: Brehmer, Skowronek (POL)
13 November 2016; 14:00	3× (yellow card) 3× (suspension)	Report	3× (yellow card) 6× (suspension)	Arena Leipzig, Leipzig; Attendance: 1,490; Referees: Brehmer, Skowronek (POL)

13 November 2016; 15:00	FTC-Rail Cargo Hungaria (Hungary)	24–37	(North Macedonia) HC Vardar	SYMA Sports and Conference Centre, Budapest; Attendance: 2,800; Referees: Christiansen, Hansen (DEN)
13 November 2016; 15:00	three players 4	(12–21)	Lekić 7	SYMA Sports and Conference Centre, Budapest; Attendance: 2,800; Referees: Christiansen, Hansen (DEN)
13 November 2016; 15:00	3× (yellow card) 4× (suspension)	Report	2× (yellow card) 2× (suspension)	SYMA Sports and Conference Centre, Budapest; Attendance: 2,800; Referees: Christiansen, Hansen (DEN)

19 November 2016; 15:00	HC Leipzig (Germany)	22–45	(North Macedonia) HC Vardar	Arena Leipzig, Leipzig; Attendance: 889; Referees: Brunovský, Čanda (SVK)
19 November 2016; 15:00	Reimer, Weise 5	(9–22)	Lacrabère 9	Arena Leipzig, Leipzig; Attendance: 889; Referees: Brunovský, Čanda (SVK)
19 November 2016; 15:00	3× (yellow card) 3× (suspension)	Report	2× (yellow card) 3× (suspension)	Arena Leipzig, Leipzig; Attendance: 889; Referees: Brunovský, Čanda (SVK)

20 November 2016; 16:00	HC Astrakhanochka (Russia)	28–33	(Hungary) FTC-Rail Cargo Hungaria	Sportcomplex Zvezdny, Astrakhan; Attendance: 3,500; Referees: Florescu, Stoia (ROU)
20 November 2016; 16:00	Sabirova 11	(14–14)	Pena, Szucsánszki 7	Sportcomplex Zvezdny, Astrakhan; Attendance: 3,500; Referees: Florescu, Stoia (ROU)
20 November 2016; 16:00	3× (yellow card) 4× (suspension)	Report	3× (yellow card) 3× (suspension)	Sportcomplex Zvezdny, Astrakhan; Attendance: 3,500; Referees: Florescu, Stoia (ROU)

=== Group C ===
Pos	Team	Pld	W	D	L	GF	GA	GD	Pts	Qualification
1	(Hungary) Győri Audi ETO KC	6	5	0	1	174	147	+27	10	Main round
2	(Romania) CSM București	6	3	0	3	142	145	−3	6 (Note: Bucharest 47–44 Midtjylland)	Main round
3	(Denmark) Midtjylland	6	3	0	3	135	150	−15	6	Main round
4	(Russia) Rostov-Don	6	1	0	5	142	151	−9	2	

Source: EHF
Rules for classification: Tiebreakers
Notes:

15 October 2016; 19:30	Győri Audi ETO KC (Hungary)	31–19	(Denmark) Midtjylland	Audi Aréna, Győr; Attendance: 5,017; Referees: Marin, García (ESP)
15 October 2016; 19:30	Løke 8	(16–7)	Pedersen 6	Audi Aréna, Győr; Attendance: 5,017; Referees: Marin, García (ESP)
15 October 2016; 19:30	3× (yellow card) 2× (suspension)	Report	2× (yellow card) 2× (suspension)	Audi Aréna, Győr; Attendance: 5,017; Referees: Marin, García (ESP)

16 October 2016; 18:00	CSM București (Romania)	24–21	(Russia) Rostov-Don	Polyvalent Hall, Bucharest; Attendance: 4,164; Referees: Jurinović, Mrvica (CRO)
16 October 2016; 18:00	Gulldén 6	(12–10)	Ilyina 6	Polyvalent Hall, Bucharest; Attendance: 4,164; Referees: Jurinović, Mrvica (CRO)
16 October 2016; 18:00	2× (yellow card) 1× (suspension)	Report	3× (yellow card) 2× (suspension)	Polyvalent Hall, Bucharest; Attendance: 4,164; Referees: Jurinović, Mrvica (CRO)

22 October 2016; 16:00	Rostov-Don (Russia)	27–28	(Hungary) Győri Audi ETO KC	Rostov-on-Don Palace of Sports, Rostov-on-Don; Attendance: 3,000; Referees: Brunovský, Čanda (SVK)
22 October 2016; 16:00	Vyakhireva 8	(14–12)	Mørk 8	Rostov-on-Don Palace of Sports, Rostov-on-Don; Attendance: 3,000; Referees: Brunovský, Čanda (SVK)
22 October 2016; 16:00	3× (yellow card) 3× (suspension)	Report	2× (yellow card) 5× (suspension)	Rostov-on-Don Palace of Sports, Rostov-on-Don; Attendance: 3,000; Referees: Brunovský, Čanda (SVK)

22 October 2016; 18:30	Midtjylland (Denmark)	24–21	(Romania) CSM București	Ikast-Brande Arena, Ikast; Attendance: 1,785; Referees: Antić, Jakovljević (SRB)
22 October 2016; 18:30	Østergaard 5	(9–10)	Martín 5	Ikast-Brande Arena, Ikast; Attendance: 1,785; Referees: Antić, Jakovljević (SRB)
22 October 2016; 18:30	3× (yellow card) 2× (suspension)	Report	2× (yellow card) 1× (suspension)	Ikast-Brande Arena, Ikast; Attendance: 1,785; Referees: Antić, Jakovljević (SRB)

28 October 2016; 18:00	CSM București (Romania)	24–27	(Hungary) Győri Audi ETO KC	Polyvalent Hall, Bucharest; Attendance: 4,963; Referees: Brehmer, Skowronek (POL)
28 October 2016; 18:00	Gulldén, Torstenson 4	(13–9)	Bódi 6	Polyvalent Hall, Bucharest; Attendance: 4,963; Referees: Brehmer, Skowronek (POL)
28 October 2016; 18:00	3× (yellow card) 4× (suspension)	Report	3× (yellow card) 7× (suspension)	Polyvalent Hall, Bucharest; Attendance: 4,963; Referees: Brehmer, Skowronek (POL)

29 October 2016; 19:00	Rostov-Don (Russia)	26–20	(Denmark) Midtjylland	Rostov-on-Don Palace of Sports, Rostov-on-Don; Attendance: 3,000; Referees: Kolevski, Krkacev (MKD)
29 October 2016; 19:00	Ilyina 6	(13–12)	Burgaard, Kristiansen 5	Rostov-on-Don Palace of Sports, Rostov-on-Don; Attendance: 3,000; Referees: Kolevski, Krkacev (MKD)
29 October 2016; 19:00	4× (yellow card) 2× (suspension)	Report	4× (yellow card)	Rostov-on-Don Palace of Sports, Rostov-on-Don; Attendance: 3,000; Referees: Kolevski, Krkacev (MKD)

4 November 2016; 19:00	Győri Audi ETO KC (Hungary)	33–25	(Romania) CSM București	Audi Aréna, Győr; Attendance: 5,162; Referees: Kurtagic, Wetterwik (SWE)
4 November 2016; 19:00	Mørk 11	(11–13)	Niombla 7	Audi Aréna, Győr; Attendance: 5,162; Referees: Kurtagic, Wetterwik (SWE)
4 November 2016; 19:00	2× (yellow card) 4× (suspension)	Report	3× (yellow card) 5× (suspension)	Audi Aréna, Győr; Attendance: 5,162; Referees: Kurtagic, Wetterwik (SWE)

6 November 2016; 16:15	Midtjylland (Denmark)	25–23	(Russia) Rostov-Don	Ikast-Brande Arena, Ikast; Attendance: 2,250; Referees: Mitrović, Vešović (MNE)
6 November 2016; 16:15	Jørgensen 8	(13–10)	Vyakhireva 6	Ikast-Brande Arena, Ikast; Attendance: 2,250; Referees: Mitrović, Vešović (MNE)
6 November 2016; 16:15	3× (yellow card) 2× (suspension)	Report	3× (yellow card) 2× (suspension)	Ikast-Brande Arena, Ikast; Attendance: 2,250; Referees: Mitrović, Vešović (MNE)

11 November 2016; 19:00	Rostov-Don (Russia)	20–22	(Romania) CSM București	Rostov-on-Don Palace of Sports, Rostov-on-Don; Attendance: 2,300; Referees: Arntsen, Røen (NOR)
11 November 2016; 19:00	three players 4	(11–10)	Gulldén 8	Rostov-on-Don Palace of Sports, Rostov-on-Don; Attendance: 2,300; Referees: Arntsen, Røen (NOR)
11 November 2016; 19:00	3× (yellow card) 2× (suspension)	Report	3× (yellow card)	Rostov-on-Don Palace of Sports, Rostov-on-Don; Attendance: 2,300; Referees: Arntsen, Røen (NOR)

12 November 2016; 15:15	Midtjylland (Denmark)	27–23	(Hungary) Győri Audi ETO KC	Ikast-Brande Arena, Ikast; Attendance: 1,981; Referees: Jurinović, Mrvica (CRO)
12 November 2016; 15:15	Jørgensen 8	(15–10)	Broch 6	Ikast-Brande Arena, Ikast; Attendance: 1,981; Referees: Jurinović, Mrvica (CRO)
12 November 2016; 15:15	3× (yellow card) 2× (suspension)	Report	2× (yellow card) 3× (suspension)	Ikast-Brande Arena, Ikast; Attendance: 1,981; Referees: Jurinović, Mrvica (CRO)

19 November 2016; 16:00	Győri Audi ETO KC (Hungary)	32–25	(Russia) Rostov-Don	Audi Aréna, Győr; Attendance: 5,207; Referees: Bonaventura, Bonaventura (FRA)
19 November 2016; 16:00	Görbicz 7	(15–12)	Cabral Barbosa 5	Audi Aréna, Győr; Attendance: 5,207; Referees: Bonaventura, Bonaventura (FRA)
19 November 2016; 16:00	3× (yellow card) 1× (suspension)	Report	3× (yellow card) 5× (suspension)	Audi Aréna, Győr; Attendance: 5,207; Referees: Bonaventura, Bonaventura (FRA)

20 November 2016; 20:00	CSM București (Romania)	26–20	(Denmark) Midtjylland	Polyvalent Hall, Bucharest; Attendance: 5,000; Referees: Opava, Válek (CZE)
20 November 2016; 20:00	Gulldén 5	(12–9)	Burgaard, Jørgensen 6	Polyvalent Hall, Bucharest; Attendance: 5,000; Referees: Opava, Válek (CZE)
20 November 2016; 20:00	3× (yellow card)	Report	1× (yellow card) 4× (suspension)	Polyvalent Hall, Bucharest; Attendance: 5,000; Referees: Opava, Válek (CZE)

=== Group D ===
Pos	Team	Pld	W	D	L	GF	GA	GD	Pts	Qualification
1	(Slovenia) Krim	6	4	0	2	168	165	+3	8	Main round
2	(Norway) Larvik HK	6	3	0	3	174	170	+4	6 (Note: Larvik 61–53 Esbjerg)	Main round
3	(Denmark) Team Esbjerg	6	3	0	3	164	151	+13	6	Main round
4	(Sweden) IK Sävehof	6	2	0	4	150	170	−20	4	

Source: EHF
Rules for classification: Tiebreakers
Notes:

15 October 2016; 14:00	Team Esbjerg (Denmark)	35–25	(Slovenia) Krim	Blue Water Dokken, Esbjerg; Attendance: 2,022; Referees: Kijauskaitė, Žalienė (LTU)
15 October 2016; 14:00	Van der Heijden 11	(17–11)	Bajramoska 6	Blue Water Dokken, Esbjerg; Attendance: 2,022; Referees: Kijauskaitė, Žalienė (LTU)
15 October 2016; 14:00	2× (yellow card) 1× (suspension)	Report	3× (yellow card) 3× (suspension)	Blue Water Dokken, Esbjerg; Attendance: 2,022; Referees: Kijauskaitė, Žalienė (LTU)

15 October 2016; 18:30	Larvik HK (Norway)	22–25	(Sweden) IK Sävehof	Boligmappa Arena Larvik, Larvik; Attendance: 1,722; Referees: Florescu, Stoia (ROU)
15 October 2016; 18:30	Riegelhuth Koren 6	(15–11)	Ekenman-Fernis 11	Boligmappa Arena Larvik, Larvik; Attendance: 1,722; Referees: Florescu, Stoia (ROU)
15 October 2016; 18:30	3× (yellow card) 2× (suspension)	Report	3× (yellow card) 3× (suspension)	Boligmappa Arena Larvik, Larvik; Attendance: 1,722; Referees: Florescu, Stoia (ROU)

22 October 2016; 16:30	Krim (Slovenia)	24–22	(Norway) Larvik HK	Arena Stožice, Ljubljana; Attendance: 1,500; Referees: Brehmer, Skowronek (POL)
22 October 2016; 16:30	three players 5	(10–13)	Riegelhuth Koren 6	Arena Stožice, Ljubljana; Attendance: 1,500; Referees: Brehmer, Skowronek (POL)
22 October 2016; 16:30	3× (yellow card) 5× (suspension)	Report	2× (yellow card) 4× (suspension)	Arena Stožice, Ljubljana; Attendance: 1,500; Referees: Brehmer, Skowronek (POL)

23 October 2016; 15:00	IK Sävehof (Sweden)	20–25	(Denmark) Team Esbjerg	Partille Arena, Partille; Attendance: 1,835; Referees: Horváth, Marton (HUN)
23 October 2016; 15:00	three players 4	(10–15)	Van der Heijden 9	Partille Arena, Partille; Attendance: 1,835; Referees: Horváth, Marton (HUN)
23 October 2016; 15:00	3× (yellow card) 4× (suspension)	Report	2× (yellow card) 4× (suspension)	Partille Arena, Partille; Attendance: 1,835; Referees: Horváth, Marton (HUN)

29 October 2016; 17:00	Krim (Slovenia)	32–29	(Sweden) IK Sävehof	Arena Stožice, Ljubljana; Attendance: 1,800; Referees: Kaveshnikov, Plotnikov (RUS)
29 October 2016; 17:00	Benko 8	(20–10)	Roberts 8	Arena Stožice, Ljubljana; Attendance: 1,800; Referees: Kaveshnikov, Plotnikov (RUS)
29 October 2016; 17:00	2× (yellow card) 3× (suspension)	Report	4× (yellow card) 2× (suspension)	Arena Stožice, Ljubljana; Attendance: 1,800; Referees: Kaveshnikov, Plotnikov (RUS)

30 October 2016; 16:50	Team Esbjerg (Denmark)	24–31	(Norway) Larvik HK	Blue Water Dokken, Esbjerg; Attendance: 1,512; Referees: Brunovský, Čanda (SVK)
30 October 2016; 16:50	Ingstad, Polman 4	(13–14)	Riegelhuth Koren 8	Blue Water Dokken, Esbjerg; Attendance: 1,512; Referees: Brunovský, Čanda (SVK)
30 October 2016; 16:50	3× (yellow card) 1× (suspension)	Report	3× (yellow card) 3× (suspension)	Blue Water Dokken, Esbjerg; Attendance: 1,512; Referees: Brunovský, Čanda (SVK)

5 November 2016; 16:00	IK Sävehof (Sweden)	26–24	(Slovenia) Krim	Partille Arena, Partille; Attendance: 1,212; Referees: Leandersson, Lindroos (FIN)
5 November 2016; 16:00	Roberts, Rombo 6	(12–11)	Omoregie 8	Partille Arena, Partille; Attendance: 1,212; Referees: Leandersson, Lindroos (FIN)
5 November 2016; 16:00	3× (yellow card) 3× (suspension)	Report	2× (yellow card) 4× (suspension)	Partille Arena, Partille; Attendance: 1,212; Referees: Leandersson, Lindroos (FIN)

5 November 2016; 18:30	Larvik HK (Norway)	30–29	(Denmark) Team Esbjerg	Boligmappa Arena Larvik, Larvik; Attendance: 1,122; Referees: Marín, García (ESP)
5 November 2016; 18:30	Riegelhuth Koren 9	(15–17)	Vestergaard 7	Boligmappa Arena Larvik, Larvik; Attendance: 1,122; Referees: Marín, García (ESP)
5 November 2016; 18:30	2× (yellow card) 3× (suspension) 1× (red card)	Report	2× (yellow card) 6× (suspension)	Boligmappa Arena Larvik, Larvik; Attendance: 1,122; Referees: Marín, García (ESP)

12 November 2016; 15:30	Krim (Slovenia)	27–22	(Denmark) Team Esbjerg	Arena Stožice, Ljubljana; Attendance: 1,700; Referees: Antić, Jakovljević (SRB)
12 November 2016; 15:30	Omoregie 7	(13—13)	Van der Heijden 5	Arena Stožice, Ljubljana; Attendance: 1,700; Referees: Antić, Jakovljević (SRB)
12 November 2016; 15:30	3× (yellow card) 3× (suspension)	Report	3× (yellow card)	Arena Stožice, Ljubljana; Attendance: 1,700; Referees: Antić, Jakovljević (SRB)

13 November 2016; 15:00	IK Sävehof (Sweden)	32–38	(Norway) Larvik HK	Partille Arena, Partille; Attendance: 1,210; Referees: Vranes, Wenninger (AUT)
13 November 2016; 15:00	Sand 8	(14–21)	Kurtović 11	Partille Arena, Partille; Attendance: 1,210; Referees: Vranes, Wenninger (AUT)
13 November 2016; 15:00	3× (yellow card) 2× (suspension)	Report	2× (yellow card) 5× (suspension) 1× (red card)	Partille Arena, Partille; Attendance: 1,210; Referees: Vranes, Wenninger (AUT)

19 November 2016; 19:15	Larvik HK (Norway)	31–36	(Slovenia) Krim	Boligmappa Arena Larvik, Larvik; Attendance: 1,802; Referees: Horváth, Marton (HUN)
19 November 2016; 19:15	Frafjord, Kurtović 10	(14–17)	Omoregie 7	Boligmappa Arena Larvik, Larvik; Attendance: 1,802; Referees: Horváth, Marton (HUN)
19 November 2016; 19:15	3× (yellow card) 2× (suspension)	Report	3× (yellow card) 6× (suspension) 1× (red card)	Boligmappa Arena Larvik, Larvik; Attendance: 1,802; Referees: Horváth, Marton (HUN)

20 November 2016; 15:00	Team Esbjerg (Denmark)	29–18	(Sweden) IK Sävehof	Blue Water Dokken, Esbjerg; Attendance: 2,291; Referees: Vujačić, Kažanegra (MNE)
20 November 2016; 15:00	Karlsson 7	(15–9)	Ekenman-Fernis 8	Blue Water Dokken, Esbjerg; Attendance: 2,291; Referees: Vujačić, Kažanegra (MNE)
20 November 2016; 15:00	3× (yellow card) 3× (suspension)	Report	3× (yellow card) 4× (suspension)	Blue Water Dokken, Esbjerg; Attendance: 2,291; Referees: Vujačić, Kažanegra (MNE)
