= 2016–17 Women's EHF Champions League main round =

This article describes the main round of the 2016–17 Women's EHF Champions League.

== Qualified teams ==
Group	Winners	Runners-up	Third place
A	(Montenegro) Budućnost	(France) Metz Handball	(Germany) Thüringer HC
B	(North Macedonia) HC Vardar	(Hungary) FTC-Rail Cargo Hungaria	(Russia) HC Astrakhanochka
C	(Hungary) Győri Audi ETO KC	(Romania) CSM București	(Denmark) Midtjylland
D	(Slovenia) Krim	(Norway) Larvik HK	(Denmark) Team Esbjerg

== Format ==
In each group, teams played against each other in a double round-robin format, with home and away matches against teams they did not met before. Points obtained in the group stage were taken over. After completion of the group stage matches, the top four teams of each group advanced to the quarterfinals.

== Groups ==
The matchdays were 27–29 January, 3–5 February, 10–12 February, 24–26 February, 3–5 March, 10–12 March 2017.

=== Group 1 ===
Pos	Team	Pld	W	D	L	GF	GA	GD	Pts	Qualification
1	(North Macedonia) HC Vardar	10	7	1	2	311	279	+32	15	Quarterfinals
2	(Hungary) FTC-Rail Cargo Hungaria	10	6	2	2	290	265	+25	14 (Note: FTC-Rail Cargo Hungaria 56–49 Budućnost)	Quarterfinals
3	(Montenegro) Budućnost	10	7	0	3	286	248	+38	14	Quarterfinals
4	(France) Metz Handball	10	5	0	5	273	238	+35	10	Quarterfinals
5	(Germany) Thüringer HC	10	2	1	7	257	286	−29	5	
6	(Russia) HC Astrakhanochka	10	1	0	9	229	330	−101	2	

Source: EHF
Rules for classification: See Tiebreakers
Notes:

28 January 2017; 18:30	Metz Handball (France)	25–28	(Hungary) FTC-Rail Cargo Hungaria	Arènes de Metz, Metz; Attendance: 4,163; Referees: Praštalo, Todorović (BIH)
28 January 2017; 18:30	Gros 9	(14–13)	Pena 7	Arènes de Metz, Metz; Attendance: 4,163; Referees: Praštalo, Todorović (BIH)
28 January 2017; 18:30	2× (yellow card) 4× (suspension)	Report	3× (yellow card) 4× (suspension)	Arènes de Metz, Metz; Attendance: 4,163; Referees: Praštalo, Todorović (BIH)

29 January 2017; 14:00	Thüringer HC (Germany)	34–22	(Russia) HC Astrakhanochka	Wiedigsburghalle, Nordhausen; Attendance: 1,600; Referees: Johansson, Kliko (SWE)
29 January 2017; 14:00	Luzumová 9	(15–9)	Sabirova 9	Wiedigsburghalle, Nordhausen; Attendance: 1,600; Referees: Johansson, Kliko (SWE)
29 January 2017; 14:00	3× (yellow card) 4× (suspension)	Report	3× (yellow card) 8× (suspension)	Wiedigsburghalle, Nordhausen; Attendance: 1,600; Referees: Johansson, Kliko (SWE)

29 January 2017; 19:30	Budućnost (Montenegro)	28–31	(North Macedonia) HC Vardar	Morača Sports Center, Podgorica; Attendance: 3,096; Referees: Arntsen, Røen (NOR)
29 January 2017; 19:30	Neagu 10	(16–16)	Penezić 8	Morača Sports Center, Podgorica; Attendance: 3,096; Referees: Arntsen, Røen (NOR)
29 January 2017; 19:30	3× (yellow card) 2× (suspension)	Report	2× (yellow card) 1× (suspension)	Morača Sports Center, Podgorica; Attendance: 3,096; Referees: Arntsen, Røen (NOR)

4 February 2017; 15:00	FTC-Rail Cargo Hungaria (Hungary)	32–24	(Germany) Thüringer HC	Elek Gyula Aréna, Budapest; Attendance: 1,300; Referees: Kijauskaitė, Žalienė (LTU)
4 February 2017; 15:00	four players 4	(15–10)	three players 4	Elek Gyula Aréna, Budapest; Attendance: 1,300; Referees: Kijauskaitė, Žalienė (LTU)
4 February 2017; 15:00	2× (yellow card) 4× (suspension)	Report	3× (yellow card) 6× (suspension)	Elek Gyula Aréna, Budapest; Attendance: 1,300; Referees: Kijauskaitė, Žalienė (LTU)

4 February 2017; 17:00	HC Astrakhanochka (Russia)	21–34	(Montenegro) Budućnost	Sportcomplex Zvezdny, Astrakhan; Attendance: 3,800; Referees: Marin, García (ESP)
4 February 2017; 17:00	Sabirova 7	(9–18)	Neagu 8	Sportcomplex Zvezdny, Astrakhan; Attendance: 3,800; Referees: Marin, García (ESP)
4 February 2017; 17:00	1× (yellow card) 2× (suspension) 1× (red card)	Report	2× (yellow card)	Sportcomplex Zvezdny, Astrakhan; Attendance: 3,800; Referees: Marin, García (ESP)

4 February 2017; 17:30	HC Vardar (North Macedonia)	23–21	(France) Metz Handball	Jane Sandanski Arena, Skopje; Attendance: 4,000; Referees: Covalciuc, Covalciuc (MDA)
4 February 2017; 17:30	Damnjanović 5	(13–11)	Gros 5	Jane Sandanski Arena, Skopje; Attendance: 4,000; Referees: Covalciuc, Covalciuc (MDA)
4 February 2017; 17:30	2× (yellow card) 3× (suspension)	Report	3× (yellow card) 3× (suspension)	Jane Sandanski Arena, Skopje; Attendance: 4,000; Referees: Covalciuc, Covalciuc (MDA)

11 February 2017; 18:30	Metz Handball (France)	37–18	(Russia) HC Astrakhanochka	Arènes de Metz, Metz; Attendance: 3,823; Referees: Leszczyński, Piechota (POL)
11 February 2017; 18:30	Sajka 5	(17–10)	Sabirova 7	Arènes de Metz, Metz; Attendance: 3,823; Referees: Leszczyński, Piechota (POL)
11 February 2017; 18:30	3× (yellow card) 3× (suspension)	Report	2× (yellow card) 6× (suspension) 1× (red card)	Arènes de Metz, Metz; Attendance: 3,823; Referees: Leszczyński, Piechota (POL)

12 February 2017; 14:00	Thüringer HC (Germany)	29–31	(North Macedonia) HC Vardar	Wiedigsburghalle, Nordhausen; Attendance: 1,500; Referees: Florescu, Stoia (ROU)
12 February 2017; 14:00	three players 5	(13–18)	Penezić 10	Wiedigsburghalle, Nordhausen; Attendance: 1,500; Referees: Florescu, Stoia (ROU)
12 February 2017; 14:00	3× (yellow card) 4× (suspension)	Report	3× (yellow card) 3× (suspension)	Wiedigsburghalle, Nordhausen; Attendance: 1,500; Referees: Florescu, Stoia (ROU)

12 February 2017; 19:00	Budućnost (Montenegro)	25–33	(Hungary) FTC-Rail Cargo Hungaria	Morača Sports Center, Podgorica; Attendance: 3,000; Referees: Tzaferopoulos, Bethmann (GRE)
12 February 2017; 19:00	Bulatović 7	(9–19)	Szucsánszki 7	Morača Sports Center, Podgorica; Attendance: 3,000; Referees: Tzaferopoulos, Bethmann (GRE)
12 February 2017; 19:00	3× (yellow card) 2× (suspension)	Report	3× (yellow card) 5× (suspension)	Morača Sports Center, Podgorica; Attendance: 3,000; Referees: Tzaferopoulos, Bethmann (GRE)

25 February 2017; 15:00	FTC-Rail Cargo Hungaria (Hungary)	29–23	(France) Metz Handball	Elek Gyula Aréna, Budapest; Attendance: 1,300; Referees: Năstase, Stancu (ROU)
25 February 2017; 15:00	Schatzl, Szucsánszki 6	(15–10)	Horacek, Zaadi 5	Elek Gyula Aréna, Budapest; Attendance: 1,300; Referees: Năstase, Stancu (ROU)
25 February 2017; 15:00	3× (yellow card) 1× (suspension)	Report	3× (yellow card) 4× (suspension)	Elek Gyula Aréna, Budapest; Attendance: 1,300; Referees: Năstase, Stancu (ROU)

25 February 2017; 17:00	HC Astrakhanochka (Russia)	26–24	(Germany) Thüringer HC	Sportcomplex Zvezdny, Astrakhan; Attendance: 3,800; Referees: Mandák, Rudinský (SVK)
25 February 2017; 17:00	Sabirova 13	(18–12)	Engel 8	Sportcomplex Zvezdny, Astrakhan; Attendance: 3,800; Referees: Mandák, Rudinský (SVK)
25 February 2017; 17:00	3× (yellow card) 2× (suspension)	Report	3× (yellow card) 3× (suspension)	Sportcomplex Zvezdny, Astrakhan; Attendance: 3,800; Referees: Mandák, Rudinský (SVK)

26 February 2017; 17:30	HC Vardar (North Macedonia)	28–31	(Montenegro) Budućnost	Jane Sandanski Arena, Skopje; Attendance: 4,500; Referees: Christiansen, Hansen (DEN)
26 February 2017; 17:30	Penezić 6	(16–17)	Bulatović 14	Jane Sandanski Arena, Skopje; Attendance: 4,500; Referees: Christiansen, Hansen (DEN)
26 February 2017; 17:30	2× (yellow card) 3× (suspension)	Report	3× (yellow card) 3× (suspension)	Jane Sandanski Arena, Skopje; Attendance: 4,500; Referees: Christiansen, Hansen (DEN)

5 March 2017; 14:00	Thüringer HC (Germany)	29–29	(Hungary) FTC-Rail Cargo Hungaria	Wiedigsburghalle, Nordhausen; Attendance: 1,800; Referees: Antić, Jakovljević (SRB)
5 March 2017; 14:00	Luzumová 12	(15–17)	Zácsik 6	Wiedigsburghalle, Nordhausen; Attendance: 1,800; Referees: Antić, Jakovljević (SRB)
5 March 2017; 14:00	3× (yellow card) 2× (suspension)	Report	3× (yellow card) 2× (suspension)	Wiedigsburghalle, Nordhausen; Attendance: 1,800; Referees: Antić, Jakovljević (SRB)

5 March 2017; 15:00	Metz Handball (France)	42–28	(North Macedonia) HC Vardar	Arènes de Metz, Metz; Attendance: 4,602; Referees: Brkic, Jusufhodzic (AUT)
5 March 2017; 15:00	Gros 12	(19–16)	Penezić 10	Arènes de Metz, Metz; Attendance: 4,602; Referees: Brkic, Jusufhodzic (AUT)
5 March 2017; 15:00	3× (yellow card) 2× (suspension)	Report	2× (yellow card) 6× (suspension)	Arènes de Metz, Metz; Attendance: 4,602; Referees: Brkic, Jusufhodzic (AUT)

5 March 2017; 19:00	Budućnost (Montenegro)	38–20	(Russia) HC Astrakhanochka	Verde Complex, Podgorica; Attendance: 500; Referees: Vranes, Wenninger (AUT)
5 March 2017; 19:00	Cvijić, Neagu 5	(18–11)	Postnova 6	Verde Complex, Podgorica; Attendance: 500; Referees: Vranes, Wenninger (AUT)
5 March 2017; 19:00	3× (yellow card) 5× (suspension)	Report	3× (yellow card) 3× (suspension)	Verde Complex, Podgorica; Attendance: 500; Referees: Vranes, Wenninger (AUT)

11 March 2017; 15:00	FTC-Rail Cargo Hungaria (Hungary)	23–24	(Montenegro) Budućnost	Elek Gyula Aréna, Budapest; Attendance: 1,300; Referees: Erdoğan, Özdeniz (TUR)
11 March 2017; 15:00	Jovanović 6	(8–9)	Bulatović, Neagu 7	Elek Gyula Aréna, Budapest; Attendance: 1,300; Referees: Erdoğan, Özdeniz (TUR)
11 March 2017; 15:00	2× (yellow card) 2× (suspension)	Report	2× (yellow card) 6× (suspension)	Elek Gyula Aréna, Budapest; Attendance: 1,300; Referees: Erdoğan, Özdeniz (TUR)

11 March 2017; 17:00	HC Astrakhanochka (Russia)	20–28	(France) Metz Handball	Sportcomplex Zvezdny, Astrakhan; Attendance: 4,000; Referees: Christidi, Papamattheou (GRE)
11 March 2017; 17:00	Chigirinova, Postnova 4	(13–11)	Smits, Zaadi 5	Sportcomplex Zvezdny, Astrakhan; Attendance: 4,000; Referees: Christidi, Papamattheou (GRE)
11 March 2017; 17:00	2× (yellow card) 7× (suspension) 1× (red card)	Report	2× (yellow card) 3× (suspension)	Sportcomplex Zvezdny, Astrakhan; Attendance: 4,000; Referees: Christidi, Papamattheou (GRE)

11 March 2017; 17:30	HC Vardar (North Macedonia)	36–26	(Germany) Thüringer HC	Jane Sandanski Arena, Skopje; Attendance: 2,000; Referees: Panayides, Andreou (CYP)
11 March 2017; 17:30	Radičević 9	(19–12)	Luzumová 7	Jane Sandanski Arena, Skopje; Attendance: 2,000; Referees: Panayides, Andreou (CYP)
11 March 2017; 17:30	3× (yellow card) 1× (suspension)	Report	3× (yellow card) 3× (suspension)	Jane Sandanski Arena, Skopje; Attendance: 2,000; Referees: Panayides, Andreou (CYP)

=== Group 2 ===
Pos	Team	Pld	W	D	L	GF	GA	GD	Pts	Qualification
1	(Hungary) Győri Audi ETO KC	10	8	1	1	305	234	+71	17	Quarterfinals
2	(Norway) Larvik HK	10	5	2	3	279	271	+8	12	Quarterfinals
3	(Romania) CSM București	10	5	1	4	265	257	+8	11	Quarterfinals
4	(Denmark) Midtjylland	10	5	0	5	250	241	+9	10	Quarterfinals
5	(Slovenia) Krim	10	3	0	7	238	290	−52	6	
6	(Denmark) Team Esbjerg	10	2	0	8	251	295	−44	4	

Source: EHF
Rules for classification: See Tiebreakers

27 January 2017; 19:30	CSM București (Romania)	26–26	(Norway) Larvik HK	Polyvalent Hall, Bucharest; Attendance: 4,973; Referees: Bounouara, Sami (FRA)
27 January 2017; 19:30	Gulldén 6	(12–13)	Kurtović 7	Polyvalent Hall, Bucharest; Attendance: 4,973; Referees: Bounouara, Sami (FRA)
27 January 2017; 19:30	3× (yellow card) 3× (suspension)	Report	3× (yellow card) 3× (suspension)	Polyvalent Hall, Bucharest; Attendance: 4,973; Referees: Bounouara, Sami (FRA)

28 January 2017; 16:30	Győri Audi ETO KC (Hungary)	39–22	(Slovenia) Krim	Audi Aréna, Győr; Attendance: 5,103; Referees: Vranes, Wenninger (AUT)
28 January 2017; 16:30	Görbicz 7	(20–9)	Milanović-Litre 7	Audi Aréna, Győr; Attendance: 5,103; Referees: Vranes, Wenninger (AUT)
28 January 2017; 16:30	2× (yellow card) 4× (suspension)	Report	3× (yellow card) 6× (suspension)	Audi Aréna, Győr; Attendance: 5,103; Referees: Vranes, Wenninger (AUT)

29 January 2017; 15:00	Midtjylland (Denmark)	38–26	(Denmark) Team Esbjerg	Ikast-Brande Arena, Ikast; Attendance: 2,049; Referees: Brehmer, Skowronek (POL)
29 January 2017; 15:00	Jørgensen 12	(17–19)	Van der Heijden 6	Ikast-Brande Arena, Ikast; Attendance: 2,049; Referees: Brehmer, Skowronek (POL)
29 January 2017; 15:00	3× (yellow card) 2× (suspension)	Report	1× (yellow card) 2× (suspension)	Ikast-Brande Arena, Ikast; Attendance: 2,049; Referees: Brehmer, Skowronek (POL)

4 February 2017; 17:00	Krim (Slovenia)	21–24	(Romania) CSM București	Kodeljevo Hall, Ljubljana; Attendance: 1,560; Referees: Pandžić, Mošorinski (SRB)
4 February 2017; 17:00	Peraica, Georgijev 5	(9–14)	Gulldén 7	Kodeljevo Hall, Ljubljana; Attendance: 1,560; Referees: Pandžić, Mošorinski (SRB)
4 February 2017; 17:00	3× (yellow card) 2× (suspension)	Report	3× (yellow card)	Kodeljevo Hall, Ljubljana; Attendance: 1,560; Referees: Pandžić, Mošorinski (SRB)

4 February 2017; 17:00	Larvik HK (Norway)	24–22	(Denmark) Midtjylland	Boligmappa Arena Larvik, Larvik; Attendance: 1,777; Referees: Kurtagic, Wetterwik (SWE)
4 February 2017; 17:00	Kurtović 9	(9–11)	Jørgensen 10	Boligmappa Arena Larvik, Larvik; Attendance: 1,777; Referees: Kurtagic, Wetterwik (SWE)
4 February 2017; 17:00	2× (yellow card) 3× (suspension)	Report	3× (yellow card) 2× (suspension)	Boligmappa Arena Larvik, Larvik; Attendance: 1,777; Referees: Kurtagic, Wetterwik (SWE)

5 February 2017; 16:50	Team Esbjerg (Denmark)	26–32	(Hungary) Győri Audi ETO KC	Blue Water Dokken, Esbjerg; Attendance: 1,820; Referees: Bonaventura, Bonaventura (FRA)
5 February 2017; 16:50	Alm 9	(12–14)	Görbicz 11	Blue Water Dokken, Esbjerg; Attendance: 1,820; Referees: Bonaventura, Bonaventura (FRA)
5 February 2017; 16:50	3× (yellow card) 1× (suspension)	Report	1× (yellow card) 2× (suspension)	Blue Water Dokken, Esbjerg; Attendance: 1,820; Referees: Bonaventura, Bonaventura (FRA)

11 February 2017; 15:30	Midtjylland (Denmark)	28–19	(Slovenia) Krim	Ikast-Brande Arena, Ikast; Attendance: 1,386; Referees: Schulze, Tönnies (GER)
11 February 2017; 15:30	Jørgensen 7	(13–11)	Bajramoska 7	Ikast-Brande Arena, Ikast; Attendance: 1,386; Referees: Schulze, Tönnies (GER)
11 February 2017; 15:30	2× (yellow card) 1× (suspension)	Report	2× (yellow card) 4× (suspension)	Ikast-Brande Arena, Ikast; Attendance: 1,386; Referees: Schulze, Tönnies (GER)

12 February 2017; 17:00	Győri Audi ETO KC (Hungary)	27–27	(Norway) Larvik HK	Audi Aréna, Győr; Attendance: 5,273; Referees: Alpaidze, Berezkina (RUS)
12 February 2017; 17:00	Mørk 7	(9–11)	Kurtović 10	Audi Aréna, Győr; Attendance: 5,273; Referees: Alpaidze, Berezkina (RUS)
12 February 2017; 17:00	3× (yellow card) 2× (suspension)	Report	2× (yellow card) 4× (suspension)	Audi Aréna, Győr; Attendance: 5,273; Referees: Alpaidze, Berezkina (RUS)

12 February 2017; 18:00	CSM București (Romania)	33–25	(Denmark) Team Esbjerg	Sala Dinamo, Bucharest; Attendance: 2,538; Referees: Gousko, Repkin (BLR)
12 February 2017; 18:00	Martín 6	(17–13)	Alm 7	Sala Dinamo, Bucharest; Attendance: 2,538; Referees: Gousko, Repkin (BLR)
12 February 2017; 18:00	3× (yellow card) 1× (suspension)	Report	3× (yellow card) 2× (suspension)	Sala Dinamo, Bucharest; Attendance: 2,538; Referees: Gousko, Repkin (BLR)

25 February 2017; 17:00	Larvik HK (Norway)	35–33	(Romania) CSM București	Boligmappa Arena Larvik, Larvik; Attendance: 2,277; Referees: Jurinović, Mrvica (CRO)
25 February 2017; 17:00	Kurtović 8	(18–18)	Martín 8	Boligmappa Arena Larvik, Larvik; Attendance: 2,277; Referees: Jurinović, Mrvica (CRO)
25 February 2017; 17:00	2× (yellow card) 2× (suspension)	Report	3× (yellow card)	Boligmappa Arena Larvik, Larvik; Attendance: 2,277; Referees: Jurinović, Mrvica (CRO)

25 February 2017; 19:15	Krim (Slovenia)	17–34	(Hungary) Győri Audi ETO KC	Kodeljevo Hall, Ljubljana; Attendance: 1,800; Referees: Baumgart, Wild (GER)
25 February 2017; 19:15	Koren 4	(10–18)	Görbicz 10	Kodeljevo Hall, Ljubljana; Attendance: 1,800; Referees: Baumgart, Wild (GER)
25 February 2017; 19:15	3× (yellow card) 5× (suspension)	Report	3× (yellow card) 3× (suspension)	Kodeljevo Hall, Ljubljana; Attendance: 1,800; Referees: Baumgart, Wild (GER)

26 February 2017; 16:50	Team Esbjerg (Denmark)	22–21	(Denmark) Midtjylland	Blue Water Dokken, Esbjerg; Attendance: 1,704; Referees: Ilieva, Karbeska (MKD)
26 February 2017; 16:50	Alm 7	(14–11)	Friis 7	Blue Water Dokken, Esbjerg; Attendance: 1,704; Referees: Ilieva, Karbeska (MKD)
26 February 2017; 16:50	3× (yellow card) 1× (suspension)	Report	3× (yellow card) 2× (suspension)	Blue Water Dokken, Esbjerg; Attendance: 1,704; Referees: Ilieva, Karbeska (MKD)

3 March 2017; 20:00	CSM București (Romania)	28–26	(Slovenia) Krim	Polyvalent Hall, Bucharest; Attendance: 4,800; Referees: Alpaidze, Berezkina (RUS)
3 March 2017; 20:00	Gulldén 10	(14–12)	four players 4	Polyvalent Hall, Bucharest; Attendance: 4,800; Referees: Alpaidze, Berezkina (RUS)
3 March 2017; 20:00	3× (yellow card) 3× (suspension)	Report	2× (yellow card) 2× (suspension)	Polyvalent Hall, Bucharest; Attendance: 4,800; Referees: Alpaidze, Berezkina (RUS)

4 March 2017; 18:30	Midtjylland (Denmark)	24–28	(Norway) Larvik HK	Ikast-Brande Arena, Ikast; Attendance: 1,972; Referees: Vujačić, Kažanegra (MNE)
4 March 2017; 18:30	Jørgensen 9	(11–18)	Kurtović 7	Ikast-Brande Arena, Ikast; Attendance: 1,972; Referees: Vujačić, Kažanegra (MNE)
4 March 2017; 18:30	3× (yellow card) 3× (suspension)	Report	2× (yellow card) 2× (suspension)	Ikast-Brande Arena, Ikast; Attendance: 1,972; Referees: Vujačić, Kažanegra (MNE)

5 March 2017; 17:00	Győri Audi ETO KC (Hungary)	33–22	(Denmark) Team Esbjerg	Audi Aréna, Győr; Attendance: 5,143; Referees: Marić, Mašić (SRB)
5 March 2017; 17:00	Amorim, Görbicz 6	(17–11)	Alm 8	Audi Aréna, Győr; Attendance: 5,143; Referees: Marić, Mašić (SRB)
5 March 2017; 17:00	2× (yellow card) 2× (suspension)	Report	3× (yellow card) 4× (suspension)	Audi Aréna, Győr; Attendance: 5,143; Referees: Marić, Mašić (SRB)

11 March 2017; 17:00	Krim (Slovenia)	21–27	(Denmark) Midtjylland	Kodeljevo Hall, Ljubljana; Attendance: 1,100; Referees: Bennani, Bennani (SWE)
11 March 2017; 17:00	Jeriček, Peraica 4	(9–10)	Kristiansen 9	Kodeljevo Hall, Ljubljana; Attendance: 1,100; Referees: Bennani, Bennani (SWE)
11 March 2017; 17:00	3× (yellow card) 2× (suspension)	Report	2× (yellow card) 3× (suspension)	Kodeljevo Hall, Ljubljana; Attendance: 1,100; Referees: Bennani, Bennani (SWE)

12 March 2017; 15:00	Team Esbjerg (Denmark)	20–25	(Romania) CSM București	Blue Water Dokken, Esbjerg; Attendance: 1,458; Referees: Brunovský, Čanda (SVK)
12 March 2017; 15:00	Karlsson 5	(7–12)	Brădeanu, Martín 5	Blue Water Dokken, Esbjerg; Attendance: 1,458; Referees: Brunovský, Čanda (SVK)
12 March 2017; 15:00	2× (yellow card) 1× (suspension)	Report	2× (yellow card) 1× (suspension)	Blue Water Dokken, Esbjerg; Attendance: 1,458; Referees: Brunovský, Čanda (SVK)

12 March 2017; 17:00	Larvik HK (Norway)	25–26	(Hungary) Győri Audi ETO KC	Boligmappa Arena Larvik, Larvik; Attendance: 3,517; Referees: Mandák, Rudinský (SVK)
12 March 2017; 17:00	Riegelhuth Koren 11	(12–14)	Amorim, Mørk 6	Boligmappa Arena Larvik, Larvik; Attendance: 3,517; Referees: Mandák, Rudinský (SVK)
12 March 2017; 17:00	3× (yellow card) 2× (suspension)	Report	3× (yellow card) 3× (suspension)	Boligmappa Arena Larvik, Larvik; Attendance: 3,517; Referees: Mandák, Rudinský (SVK)
