= 2016 European Women's Handball Championship =

2016 EHF European Women's Handball Championship

Tournament details
- Host country: Sweden
- Venues: 5 (in 5 host cities)
- Dates: 4–18 December
- Teams: 16 (from 1 confederation)

Final positions
- Champions: Norway (7th title)
- Runners-up: Netherlands
- Third place: France
- Fourth place: Denmark

Tournament statistics
- Matches played: 47
- Goals scored: 2,309 (49.13 per match)
- Attendance: 148,800 (3,166 per match)
- Top scorer(s): (Norway) Nora Mørk (53 goals)

Awards
- Best player: (Netherlands) Nycke Groot

The 2016 European Women's Handball Championship was held in Sweden from 4 to 18 December 2016. It was the second time that Sweden hosts the tournament, after it also hosted the 2006 European Women's Handball Championship.

Sweden was awarded the championship on the EHF Congress in Monaco on 23 June 2012.

Norway won their seventh title after a 30–29 victory over the Netherlands. France captured the bronze medal, after a 25–22 victory over Denmark.

== Bidding process ==
There were two bids:

- Sweden
- Turkey (withdrew)

Turkey withdrew their bid, leaving Sweden as the sole bid. they were given the hosting rights on the 23 June 2012.

== Venues ==
| Stockholm | Gothenburg | Malmö | Kristianstad | Helsingborg |
| Hovet; Capacity: 8,094 | Scandinavium; Capacity: 12,312 | Malmö Isstadion; Capacity: 5,339 | Kristianstad Arena; Capacity: 4,700 | Helsingborg Arena; Capacity: 4,700 |
| Group A | Group I Knockout stage | Group C | Group B | Group D Group II |

== Qualification ==
=== Qualified teams ===
| Country | Qualified as | Qualified on | Previous appearances in tournament |
|---|---|---|---|
| Sweden | Host | 23 June 2012 | 9 (1994, 1996, 2002, 2004, 2006, 2008, 2010, 2012, 2014) |
| Russia | Group 6 winner | 12 March 2016 | 11 (1994, 1996, 1998, 2000, 2002, 2004, 2006, 2008, 2010, 2012, 2014) |
| France | Group 7 winner | 12 March 2016 | 8 (2000, 2002, 2004, 2006, 2008, 2010, 2012, 2014) |
| Hungary | Group 5 winner | 1 June 2016 | 11 (1994, 1996, 1998, **2000**, 2002, 2004, 2006, 2008, 2010, 2012, 2014) |
| Norway | Group 1 winner | 1 June 2016 | 11 (1994, 1996, **1998**, 2000, 2002, **2004**, **2006**, **2008**, **2010**, 2012, **2014**) |
| Romania | Group 1 runner-up | 1 June 2016 | 10 (1994, 1996, 1998, 2000, 2002, 2004, 2008, 2010, 2012, 2014) |
| Serbia | Group 2 winner | 1 June 2016 | 4 (2008, 2010, 2012, 2014) |
| Czech Republic | Group 2 runner-up | 1 June 2016 | 4 (1994, 2002, 2004, 2012) |
| Netherlands | Group 3 winner | 1 June 2016 | 5 (1998, 2002, 2006, 2010, 2014) |
| Spain | Group 3 runner-up | 1 June 2016 | 8 (1998, 2002, 2004, 2006, 2008, 2010, 2012, 2014) |
| Poland | Group 5 runner-up | 1 June 2016 | 4 (1996, 1998, 2006, 2014) |
| Germany | Group 7 runner-up | 1 June 2016 | 11 (1994, 1996, 1998, 2000, 2002, 2004, 2006, 2008, 2010, 2012, 2014) |
| Montenegro | Group 4 winner | 2 June 2016 | 3 (2010, **2012**, 2014) |
| Denmark | Group 6 runner-up | 2 June 2016 | 11 (**1994**, **1996**, 1998, 2000, **2002**, 2004, 2006, 2008, 2010, 2012, 2014) |
| Croatia | Group 4 runner-up | 2 June 2016 | 8 (1994, 1996, 2004, 2006, 2008, 2010, 2012, 2014) |
| Slovenia | Best third-ranked team | 5 June 2016 | 4 (2002, 2004, 2006, 2010) |

Note: Bold indicates champion for that year. Italic indicates host for that year.

== Draw ==
The draw was held on 10 June 2016 at 13:00 local time at the Lisebergshallen in Gothenburg, Sweden.

| Pot 1 | Pot 2 | Pot 3 | Pot 4 |
|---|---|---|---|
| Norway; Netherlands; Sweden; Montenegro | France; Hungary; Russia; Serbia | Spain; Denmark; Romania; Germany | Poland; Croatia; Czech Republic; Slovenia |

== Referees ==
14 referee pairs were selected on 17 June 2016, of which 12 will be refereeing the tournament. Of these, 7 pairs are women and 5 are men.

Referees
| Croatia | Dalibor Jurinović; Marko Mrvica |
| Denmark | Karina Christiansen; Line Hansen |
| Hungary | Péter Horváth; Balázs Márton |
| Lithuania | Viktorija Kijauskaite; Aušra Žaliene |
| Norway | Kjersti Arntsen; Guro Røen |
| Poland | Joanna Brehmer; Agnieszka Skowronek |

Referees
| Romania | Diana-Carmen Florescu; Anamaria Stoia |
| Russia | Victoria Alpaidze; Tatyana Berezkina |
| Serbia | Vanja Antić; Jelena Jakovljević |
| Slovakia | Peter Brunovský; Vladimír Čanda |
| Spain | Andreu Marín; Ignacio García |
| Sweden | Mirza Kurtagic; Mattias Wetterwik |

== Preliminary round ==
The schedule was announced on 16 June 2016.

All times are local (UTC+1).

=== Group A ===
| Pos | Team | Pld | W | D | L | GF | GA | GD | Pts | Qualification |
|---|---|---|---|---|---|---|---|---|---|---|
| 1 | Serbia | 3 | 2 | 1 | 0 | 91 | 87 | +4 | 5 | Main round |
| 2 | Sweden (H) | 3 | 1 | 1 | 1 | 78 | 74 | +4 | 3 | Main round |
| 3 | Spain | 3 | 1 | 0 | 2 | 72 | 68 | +4 | 2 (Note: Spain 30–18 Slovenia) | Main round |
| 4 | Slovenia | 3 | 1 | 0 | 2 | 77 | 89 | −12 | 2 | |

Source: EHF
Rules for classification: 1) points; 2) head-to-head points; 3) head-to-head goal difference; 4) head-to-head number of goals scored; 5) goal difference.
(H) Hosts
Notes:

| 4 December 2016; 15:15 | Serbia | 36–34 | Slovenia | Hovet, Stockholm; Attendance: 6,000; Referees: Arntsen, Røen (NOR) |
| 4 December 2016; 15:15 | Radosavljević 8 | (17–16) | Mavsar 9 | Hovet, Stockholm; Attendance: 6,000; Referees: Arntsen, Røen (NOR) |
| 4 December 2016; 15:15 | 2× (yellow card) 3× (suspension) | Report | 2× (yellow card) 3× (suspension) | Hovet, Stockholm; Attendance: 6,000; Referees: Arntsen, Røen (NOR) |

| 4 December 2016; 18:00 | Sweden | 25–19 | Spain | Hovet, Stockholm; Attendance: 7,900; Referees: Jurinović, Mrvica (CRO) |
| 4 December 2016; 18:00 | Alm, Hagman 5 | (14–10) | Martín 7 | Hovet, Stockholm; Attendance: 7,900; Referees: Jurinović, Mrvica (CRO) |
| 4 December 2016; 18:00 | 2× (yellow card) 3× (suspension) | Report | 4× (yellow card) 3× (suspension) | Hovet, Stockholm; Attendance: 7,900; Referees: Jurinović, Mrvica (CRO) |

| 6 December 2016; 18:30 | Spain | 23–25 | Serbia | Hovet, Stockholm; Attendance: 2,700; Referees: Christiansen, Hansen (DEN) |
| 6 December 2016; 18:30 | Martín 6 | (8–11) | Krpež Slezak 6 | Hovet, Stockholm; Attendance: 2,700; Referees: Christiansen, Hansen (DEN) |
| 6 December 2016; 18:30 | 4× (yellow card) 4× (suspension) | Report | 2× (yellow card) 3× (suspension) | Hovet, Stockholm; Attendance: 2,700; Referees: Christiansen, Hansen (DEN) |

| 6 December 2016; 20.45 | Slovenia | 25–23 | Sweden | Hovet, Stockholm; Attendance: 3,700; Referees: Florescu, Stoia (ROU) |
| 6 December 2016; 20.45 | Mavsar 6 | (13–13) | Gulldén 10 | Hovet, Stockholm; Attendance: 3,700; Referees: Florescu, Stoia (ROU) |
| 6 December 2016; 20.45 | 3× (yellow card) 3× (suspension) | Report | 2× (yellow card) 3× (suspension) | Hovet, Stockholm; Attendance: 3,700; Referees: Florescu, Stoia (ROU) |

| 8 December 2016; 18:30 | Spain | 30–18 | Slovenia | Hovet, Stockholm; Attendance: 3,100; Referees: Horváth, Márton (HUN) |
| 8 December 2016; 18:30 | Pena 6 | (14–5) | Mavsar 5 | Hovet, Stockholm; Attendance: 3,100; Referees: Horváth, Márton (HUN) |
| 8 December 2016; 18:30 | 3× (yellow card) 4× (suspension) | Report | 3× (yellow card) 5× (suspension) | Hovet, Stockholm; Attendance: 3,100; Referees: Horváth, Márton (HUN) |

| 8 December 2016; 20:45 | Sweden | 30–30 | Serbia | Hovet, Stockholm; Attendance: 5,200; Referees: Alpaidze, Berezkina (RUS) |
| 8 December 2016; 20:45 | Sand 8 | (15–18) | three players 5 | Hovet, Stockholm; Attendance: 5,200; Referees: Alpaidze, Berezkina (RUS) |
| 8 December 2016; 20:45 | 2× (yellow card) 5× (suspension) | Report | 2× (yellow card) 4× (suspension) | Hovet, Stockholm; Attendance: 5,200; Referees: Alpaidze, Berezkina (RUS) |

=== Group B ===
| Pos | Team | Pld | W | D | L | GF | GA | GD | Pts | Qualification |
|---|---|---|---|---|---|---|---|---|---|---|
| 1 | Germany | 3 | 2 | 0 | 1 | 73 | 71 | +2 | 4 (Note: Germany 2 Pts, +1 GD, 50 GF; France 2 Pts, +1 GD, 39 GF; Netherlands 2 Pts, −2 GD) | Main round |
| 2 | France | 3 | 2 | 0 | 1 | 70 | 60 | +10 | 4 | Main round |
| 3 | Netherlands | 3 | 2 | 0 | 1 | 75 | 68 | +7 | 4 | Main round |
| 4 | Poland | 3 | 0 | 0 | 3 | 65 | 84 | −19 | 0 | |

Source: EHF
Rules for classification: 1) points; 2) head-to-head points; 3) head-to-head goal difference; 4) head-to-head number of goals scored; 5) goal difference.
Notes:

| 4 December 2016; 18:30 | Netherlands | 27–30 | Germany | Kristianstad Arena, Kristianstad; Attendance: 2,026; Referees: Horváth, Márton (HUN) |
| 4 December 2016; 18:30 | Abbingh, Groot 5 | (14–13) | Huber 7 | Kristianstad Arena, Kristianstad; Attendance: 2,026; Referees: Horváth, Márton (HUN) |
| 4 December 2016; 18:30 | 3× (yellow card) 2× (suspension) 1× (red card) | Report | 3× (yellow card) 4× (suspension) | Kristianstad Arena, Kristianstad; Attendance: 2,026; Referees: Horváth, Márton (HUN) |

| 4 December 2016; 20:45 | France | 31–22 | Poland | Kristianstad Arena, Kristianstad; Attendance: 1,750; Referees: Christiansen, Hansen (DEN) |
| 4 December 2016; 20:45 | three players 5 | (15–9) | Grzyb 6 | Kristianstad Arena, Kristianstad; Attendance: 1,750; Referees: Christiansen, Hansen (DEN) |
| 4 December 2016; 20:45 | 3× (yellow card) 5× (suspension) | Report | 3× (yellow card) 3× (suspension) | Kristianstad Arena, Kristianstad; Attendance: 1,750; Referees: Christiansen, Hansen (DEN) |

| 6 December 2016; 18:30 | Poland | 21–30 | Netherlands | Kristianstad Arena, Kristianstad; Attendance: 2,105; Referees: Alpaidze, Berezkina (RUS) |
| 6 December 2016; 18:30 | Wojtas 5 | (11–14) | Abbingh, Goos 5 | Kristianstad Arena, Kristianstad; Attendance: 2,105; Referees: Alpaidze, Berezkina (RUS) |
| 6 December 2016; 18:30 | 2× (yellow card) 4× (suspension) | Report | 3× (yellow card) 4× (suspension) | Kristianstad Arena, Kristianstad; Attendance: 2,105; Referees: Alpaidze, Berezkina (RUS) |

| 6 December 2016; 20:45 | Germany | 20–22 | France | Kristianstad Arena, Kristianstad; Attendance: 1,805; Referees: Jurinović, Mrvica (CRO) |
| 6 December 2016; 20:45 | Huber 6 | (11–11) | Nze Minko 5 | Kristianstad Arena, Kristianstad; Attendance: 1,805; Referees: Jurinović, Mrvica (CRO) |
| 6 December 2016; 20:45 | 4× (yellow card) 2× (suspension) | Report | 2× (yellow card) | Kristianstad Arena, Kristianstad; Attendance: 1,805; Referees: Jurinović, Mrvica (CRO) |

| 8 December 2016; 18:30 | Germany | 23–22 | Poland | Kristianstad Arena, Kristianstad; Attendance: 1,875; Referees: Florescu, Stoia (ROU) |
| 8 December 2016; 18:30 | Huber 7 | (12–10) | Achruk 7 | Kristianstad Arena, Kristianstad; Attendance: 1,875; Referees: Florescu, Stoia (ROU) |
| 8 December 2016; 18:30 | 2× (yellow card) 3× (suspension) | Report | 3× (yellow card) 1× (suspension) | Kristianstad Arena, Kristianstad; Attendance: 1,875; Referees: Florescu, Stoia (ROU) |

| 8 December 2016; 20:45 | Netherlands | 18–17 | France | Kristianstad Arena, Kristianstad; Attendance: 1,730; Referees: Arntsen, Røen (NOR) |
| 8 December 2016; 20:45 | Visser 5 | (7–12) | Nze Minko 5 | Kristianstad Arena, Kristianstad; Attendance: 1,730; Referees: Arntsen, Røen (NOR) |
| 8 December 2016; 20:45 | 1× (yellow card) 2× (suspension) | Report | 3× (yellow card) 3× (suspension) | Kristianstad Arena, Kristianstad; Attendance: 1,730; Referees: Arntsen, Røen (NOR) |

=== Group C ===
| Pos | Team | Pld | W | D | L | GF | GA | GD | Pts | Qualification |
|---|---|---|---|---|---|---|---|---|---|---|
| 1 | Denmark | 3 | 3 | 0 | 0 | 78 | 69 | +9 | 6 | Main round |
| 2 | Czech Republic | 3 | 1 | 0 | 2 | 83 | 83 | 0 | 2 (Note: Czech Republic 2 Pts, +4 GD; Hungary 2 Pts, +2 GD; Montenegro 2 Pts, −6 GD) | Main round |
| 3 | Hungary | 3 | 1 | 0 | 2 | 62 | 64 | −2 | 2 | Main round |
| 4 | Montenegro | 3 | 1 | 0 | 2 | 63 | 70 | −7 | 2 | |

Source: EHF
Rules for classification: 1) points; 2) head-to-head points; 3) head-to-head goal difference; 4) head-to-head number of goals scored; 5) goal difference.
Notes:

| 5 December 2016; 18:30 | Hungary | 22–27 | Czech Republic | Malmö Isstadion, Malmö; Attendance: 753; Referees: Kijauskaite, Žaliene (LTU) |
| 5 December 2016; 18:30 | Kovács 7 | (10–13) | Hrbková, Malá 5 | Malmö Isstadion, Malmö; Attendance: 753; Referees: Kijauskaite, Žaliene (LTU) |
| 5 December 2016; 18:30 | 2× (yellow card) 5× (suspension) | Report | 3× (yellow card) 3× (suspension) | Malmö Isstadion, Malmö; Attendance: 753; Referees: Kijauskaite, Žaliene (LTU) |

| 5 December 2016; 20:45 | Montenegro | 21–22 | Denmark | Malmö Isstadion, Malmö; Attendance: 1,674; Referees: Brunovský, Čanda (SVK) |
| 5 December 2016; 20:45 | Knežević 7 | (11–14) | Jørgensen 9 | Malmö Isstadion, Malmö; Attendance: 1,674; Referees: Brunovský, Čanda (SVK) |
| 5 December 2016; 20:45 | 2× (yellow card) 3× (suspension) | Report | 3× (yellow card) 2× (suspension) | Malmö Isstadion, Malmö; Attendance: 1,674; Referees: Brunovský, Čanda (SVK) |

| 7 December 2016; 18:30 | Czech Republic | 27–28 | Montenegro | Malmö Isstadion, Malmö; Attendance: 654; Referees: Kurtagic, Wetterwik (SWE) |
| 7 December 2016; 18:30 | Hrbková 6 | (12–13) | Jauković, Mehmedović 7 | Malmö Isstadion, Malmö; Attendance: 654; Referees: Kurtagic, Wetterwik (SWE) |
| 7 December 2016; 18:30 | 3× (yellow card) 3× (suspension) | Report | 3× (yellow card) 7× (suspension) | Malmö Isstadion, Malmö; Attendance: 654; Referees: Kurtagic, Wetterwik (SWE) |

| 7 December 2016; 20:45 | Denmark | 23–19 | Hungary | Malmö Isstadion, Malmö; Attendance: 1,946; Referees: Brehmer, Skowronek (POL) |
| 7 December 2016; 20:45 | Jørgensen 5 | (12–10) | Görbicz 6 | Malmö Isstadion, Malmö; Attendance: 1,946; Referees: Brehmer, Skowronek (POL) |
| 7 December 2016; 20:45 | 3× (yellow card) 5× (suspension) | Report | 4× (yellow card) 3× (suspension) | Malmö Isstadion, Malmö; Attendance: 1,946; Referees: Brehmer, Skowronek (POL) |

| 9 December 2016; 18:30 | Montenegro | 14–21 | Hungary | Malmö Isstadion, Malmö; Attendance: 1,279; Referees: Marín, García (ESP) |
| 9 December 2016; 18:30 | four players 2 | (6–11) | Görbicz 5 | Malmö Isstadion, Malmö; Attendance: 1,279; Referees: Marín, García (ESP) |
| 9 December 2016; 18:30 | 3× (yellow card) 2× (suspension) | Report | 3× (yellow card) 2× (suspension) | Malmö Isstadion, Malmö; Attendance: 1,279; Referees: Marín, García (ESP) |

| 9 December 2016; 20:45 | Denmark | 33–29 | Czech Republic | Malmö Isstadion, Malmö; Attendance: 3,124; Referees: Antić, Jakovljević (SRB) |
| 9 December 2016; 20:45 | Jørgensen 9 | (13–17) | Růčková 7 | Malmö Isstadion, Malmö; Attendance: 3,124; Referees: Antić, Jakovljević (SRB) |
| 9 December 2016; 20:45 | 3× (yellow card) 7× (suspension) | Report | 4× (yellow card) 5× (suspension) | Malmö Isstadion, Malmö; Attendance: 3,124; Referees: Antić, Jakovljević (SRB) |

=== Group D ===
| Pos | Team | Pld | W | D | L | GF | GA | GD | Pts | Qualification |
|---|---|---|---|---|---|---|---|---|---|---|
| 1 | Norway | 3 | 3 | 0 | 0 | 80 | 58 | +22 | 6 | Main round |
| 2 | Romania | 3 | 2 | 0 | 1 | 74 | 66 | +8 | 4 | Main round |
| 3 | Russia | 3 | 1 | 0 | 2 | 70 | 71 | −1 | 2 | Main round |
| 4 | Croatia | 3 | 0 | 0 | 3 | 68 | 97 | −29 | 0 | |

Source: EHF
Rules for classification: 1) points; 2) head-to-head points; 3) head-to-head goal difference; 4) head-to-head number of goals scored; 5) goal difference.

| 5 December 2016; 18:30 | Russia | 32–26 | Croatia | Helsingborg Arena, Helsingborg; Attendance: 2,571; Referees: Marín, García (ESP) |
| 5 December 2016; 18:30 | Bobrovnikova, Zhilinskayte 6 | (16–13) | Penezić 8 | Helsingborg Arena, Helsingborg; Attendance: 2,571; Referees: Marín, García (ESP) |
| 5 December 2016; 18:30 | 2× (yellow card) 6× (suspension) | Report | 4× (yellow card) 9× (suspension) | Helsingborg Arena, Helsingborg; Attendance: 2,571; Referees: Marín, García (ESP) |

| 5 December 2016; 20:45 | Norway | 23–21 | Romania | Helsingborg Arena, Helsingborg; Attendance: 1,278; Referees: Brehmer, Skowronek (POL) |
| 5 December 2016; 20:45 | Mørk 7 | (13–11) | Neagu 6 | Helsingborg Arena, Helsingborg; Attendance: 1,278; Referees: Brehmer, Skowronek (POL) |
| 5 December 2016; 20:45 | 3× (yellow card) 6× (suspension) | Report | 3× (yellow card) 4× (suspension) | Helsingborg Arena, Helsingborg; Attendance: 1,278; Referees: Brehmer, Skowronek (POL) |

| 7 December 2016; 18:30 | Romania | 22–17 | Russia | Helsingborg Arena, Helsingborg; Attendance: 1,279; Referees: Antić, Jakovljević (SRB) |
| 7 December 2016; 18:30 | Buceschi, Neagu 7 | (11–9) | Postnova 4 | Helsingborg Arena, Helsingborg; Attendance: 1,279; Referees: Antić, Jakovljević (SRB) |
| 7 December 2016; 18:30 | 3× (yellow card) 4× (suspension) | Report | 2× (yellow card) 2× (suspension) | Helsingborg Arena, Helsingborg; Attendance: 1,279; Referees: Antić, Jakovljević (SRB) |

| 7 December 2016; 20:45 | Croatia | 16–34 | Norway | Helsingborg Arena, Helsingborg; Attendance: 1,375; Referees: Kijauskaite, Žaliene (LTU) |
| 7 December 2016; 20:45 | Penezić 4 | (9–15) | Frafjord 6 | Helsingborg Arena, Helsingborg; Attendance: 1,375; Referees: Kijauskaite, Žaliene (LTU) |
| 7 December 2016; 20:45 | 2× (yellow card) 6× (suspension) 1× (red card) | Report | 3× (yellow card) 5× (suspension) | Helsingborg Arena, Helsingborg; Attendance: 1,375; Referees: Kijauskaite, Žaliene (LTU) |

| 9 December 2016; 18:30 | Romania | 31–26 | Croatia | Helsingborg Arena, Helsingborg; Attendance: 2,435; Referees: Kurtagic, Wetterwik (SWE) |
| 9 December 2016; 18:30 | Neagu 10 | (15–13) | Penezić 8 | Helsingborg Arena, Helsingborg; Attendance: 2,435; Referees: Kurtagic, Wetterwik (SWE) |
| 9 December 2016; 18:30 | 4× (yellow card) 7× (suspension) | Report | 2× (yellow card) 5× (suspension) | Helsingborg Arena, Helsingborg; Attendance: 2,435; Referees: Kurtagic, Wetterwik (SWE) |

| 9 December 2016; 20:45 | Norway | 23–21 | Russia | Helsingborg Arena, Helsingborg; Attendance: 2,493; Referees: Brunovský, Čanda (SVK) |
| 9 December 2016; 20:45 | Kristiansen, Mørk 5 | (11–11) | three players 3 | Helsingborg Arena, Helsingborg; Attendance: 2,493; Referees: Brunovský, Čanda (SVK) |
| 9 December 2016; 20:45 | 2× (yellow card) 3× (suspension) | Report | 2× (yellow card) 3× (suspension) | Helsingborg Arena, Helsingborg; Attendance: 2,493; Referees: Brunovský, Čanda (SVK) |

== Main round ==
Points obtained against qualified teams from the same group were carried over.

=== Group I ===
| Pos | Team | Pld | W | D | L | GF | GA | GD | Pts | Qualification |
|---|---|---|---|---|---|---|---|---|---|---|
| 1 | Netherlands | 5 | 4 | 0 | 1 | 142 | 128 | +14 | 8 (Note: Netherlands 18–17 France) | Semifinals |
| 2 | France | 5 | 4 | 0 | 1 | 111 | 100 | +11 | 8 | Semifinals |
| 3 | Germany | 5 | 3 | 1 | 1 | 124 | 110 | +14 | 7 | Fifth place game |
| 4 | Sweden (H) | 5 | 1 | 1 | 3 | 126 | 131 | −5 | 3 (Note: Sweden 30–30 Serbia) | |
| 5 | Serbia | 5 | 1 | 1 | 3 | 122 | 142 | −20 | 3 | |
| 6 | Spain | 5 | 0 | 1 | 4 | 108 | 122 | −14 | 1 | |

Source: EHF
Rules for classification: 1) points; 2) head-to-head points; 3) head-to-head goal difference; 4) head-to-head number of goals scored; 5) goal difference.
(H) Hosts
Notes:

| 10 December 2016; 16:15 | Serbia | 19–26 | Germany | Scandinavium, Gothenburg; Attendance: 4,212; Referees: Horváth, Márton (HUN) |
| 10 December 2016; 16:15 | Georgijev 7 | (10–14) | Huber, Hubinger 4 | Scandinavium, Gothenburg; Attendance: 4,212; Referees: Horváth, Márton (HUN) |
| 10 December 2016; 16:15 | 3× (yellow card) 6× (suspension) | Report | 2× (yellow card) 9× (suspension) | Scandinavium, Gothenburg; Attendance: 4,212; Referees: Horváth, Márton (HUN) |

| 10 December 2016; 18:30 | Sweden | 30–33 | Netherlands | Scandinavium, Gothenburg; Attendance: 6,102; Referees: Jurinović, Mrvica (CRO) |
| 10 December 2016; 18:30 | Gulldén 8 | (13–14) | Groot 7 | Scandinavium, Gothenburg; Attendance: 6,102; Referees: Jurinović, Mrvica (CRO) |
| 10 December 2016; 18:30 | 2× (yellow card) 4× (suspension) | Report | 3× (yellow card) 6× (suspension) 1× (red card) | Scandinavium, Gothenburg; Attendance: 6,102; Referees: Jurinović, Mrvica (CRO) |

| 10 December 2016; 20:45 | Spain | 22–23 | France | Scandinavium, Gothenburg; Attendance: 3,702; Referees: Christiansen, Hansen (DEN) |
| 10 December 2016; 20:45 | Pena 5 | (14–10) | Pineau 9 | Scandinavium, Gothenburg; Attendance: 3,702; Referees: Christiansen, Hansen (DEN) |
| 10 December 2016; 20:45 | 4× (yellow card) 6× (suspension) | Report | 2× (yellow card) 2× (suspension) | Scandinavium, Gothenburg; Attendance: 3,702; Referees: Christiansen, Hansen (DEN) |

| 12 December 2016; 16:15 | Spain | 20–20 | Germany | Scandinavium, Gothenburg; Attendance: 1,697; Referees: Arntsen, Røen (NOR) |
| 12 December 2016; 16:15 | Pena 7 | (12–9) | Hubinger 5 | Scandinavium, Gothenburg; Attendance: 1,697; Referees: Arntsen, Røen (NOR) |
| 12 December 2016; 16:15 | 3× (yellow card) 2× (suspension) | Report | 4× (yellow card) 3× (suspension) | Scandinavium, Gothenburg; Attendance: 1,697; Referees: Arntsen, Røen (NOR) |

| 12 December 2016; 18:30 | Serbia | 27–35 | Netherlands | Scandinavium, Gothenburg; Attendance: 3,663; Referees: Florescu, Stoia (ROU) |
| 12 December 2016; 18:30 | Stoiljković 8 | (12–17) | Abbingh, Broch 6 | Scandinavium, Gothenburg; Attendance: 3,663; Referees: Florescu, Stoia (ROU) |
| 12 December 2016; 18:30 | 3× (yellow card) 2× (suspension) | Report | 2× (yellow card) 4× (suspension) | Scandinavium, Gothenburg; Attendance: 3,663; Referees: Florescu, Stoia (ROU) |

| 12 December 2016; 20:45 | Sweden | 19–21 | France | Scandinavium, Gothenburg; Attendance: 5,279; Referees: Alpaidze, Berezkina (RUS) |
| 12 December 2016; 20:45 | Roberts 5 | (10–12) | Nze Minko 6 | Scandinavium, Gothenburg; Attendance: 5,279; Referees: Alpaidze, Berezkina (RUS) |
| 12 December 2016; 20:45 | 3× (yellow card) 2× (suspension) | Report | 2× (yellow card) 4× (suspension) 1× (red card) | Scandinavium, Gothenburg; Attendance: 5,279; Referees: Alpaidze, Berezkina (RUS) |

| 14 December 2016; 16:15 | Spain | 24–29 | Netherlands | Scandinavium, Gothenburg; Attendance: 1,896; Referees: Horváth, Márton (HUN) |
| 14 December 2016; 16:15 | Martín 6 | (13–15) | Polman 10 | Scandinavium, Gothenburg; Attendance: 1,896; Referees: Horváth, Márton (HUN) |
| 14 December 2016; 16:15 | 3× (yellow card) 4× (suspension) | Report | 2× (yellow card) 4× (suspension) | Scandinavium, Gothenburg; Attendance: 1,896; Referees: Horváth, Márton (HUN) |

| 14 December 2016; 18:30 | Sweden | 22–28 | Germany | Scandinavium, Gothenburg; Attendance: 5,031; Referees: Brunovský, Čanda (SVK) |
| 14 December 2016; 18:30 | Hagman, Alm 4 | (9–12) | Bölk 5 | Scandinavium, Gothenburg; Attendance: 5,031; Referees: Brunovský, Čanda (SVK) |
| 14 December 2016; 18:30 | 1× (yellow card) 3× (suspension) | Report | 2× (yellow card) 2× (suspension) | Scandinavium, Gothenburg; Attendance: 5,031; Referees: Brunovský, Čanda (SVK) |

| 14 December 2016; 20:45 | Serbia | 21–28 | France | Scandinavium, Gothenburg; Attendance: 2,243; Referees: Christiansen, Hansen (DEN) |
| 14 December 2016; 20:45 | Stoiljković 6 | (12–15) | Ayglon, Nze Minko 6 | Scandinavium, Gothenburg; Attendance: 2,243; Referees: Christiansen, Hansen (DEN) |
| 14 December 2016; 20:45 | 3× (yellow card) 3× (suspension) | Report | 2× (yellow card) 3× (suspension) | Scandinavium, Gothenburg; Attendance: 2,243; Referees: Christiansen, Hansen (DEN) |

=== Group II ===
| Pos | Team | Pld | W | D | L | GF | GA | GD | Pts | Qualification |
|---|---|---|---|---|---|---|---|---|---|---|
| 1 | Norway | 5 | 5 | 0 | 0 | 127 | 109 | +18 | 10 | Semifinals |
| 2 | Denmark | 5 | 3 | 1 | 1 | 123 | 113 | +10 | 7 | Semifinals |
| 3 | Romania | 5 | 3 | 0 | 2 | 119 | 110 | +9 | 6 | Fifth place game |
| 4 | Russia | 5 | 1 | 2 | 2 | 116 | 121 | −5 | 4 | |
| 5 | Czech Republic | 5 | 1 | 0 | 4 | 132 | 146 | −14 | 2 | |
| 6 | Hungary | 5 | 0 | 1 | 4 | 111 | 129 | −18 | 1 | |

Source: EHF
Rules for classification: 1) points; 2) head-to-head points; 3) head-to-head goal difference; 4) head-to-head number of goals scored; 5) goal difference.

| 11 December 2016; 16:15 | Czech Republic | 24–26 | Russia | Helsingborg Arena, Helsingborg; Attendance: 1,021; Referees: Brehmer, Skowronek (POL) |
| 11 December 2016; 16:15 | Růčková 5 | (12–14) | Sen 4 | Helsingborg Arena, Helsingborg; Attendance: 1,021; Referees: Brehmer, Skowronek (POL) |
| 11 December 2016; 16:15 | 2× (yellow card) | Report | 3× (yellow card) 1× (suspension) | Helsingborg Arena, Helsingborg; Attendance: 1,021; Referees: Brehmer, Skowronek (POL) |

| 11 December 2016; 18:30 | Hungary | 21–29 | Romania | Helsingborg Arena, Helsingborg; Attendance: 2,236; Referees: Brunovský, Čanda (SVK) |
| 11 December 2016; 18:30 | four players 3 | (9–15) | Neagu 10 | Helsingborg Arena, Helsingborg; Attendance: 2,236; Referees: Brunovský, Čanda (SVK) |
| 11 December 2016; 18:30 | 3× (yellow card) 3× (suspension) | Report | 3× (yellow card) 3× (suspension) | Helsingborg Arena, Helsingborg; Attendance: 2,236; Referees: Brunovský, Čanda (SVK) |

| 11 December 2016; 20:45 | Denmark | 20–22 | Norway | Helsingborg Arena, Helsingborg; Attendance: 2,553; Referees: Marín, García (ESP) |
| 11 December 2016; 20:45 | three players 4 | (9–14) | Mørk 5 | Helsingborg Arena, Helsingborg; Attendance: 2,553; Referees: Marín, García (ESP) |
| 11 December 2016; 20:45 | 2× (yellow card) 3× (suspension) | Report | 2× (yellow card) 3× (suspension) | Helsingborg Arena, Helsingborg; Attendance: 2,553; Referees: Marín, García (ESP) |

| 13 December 2016; 16:15 | Czech Republic | 28–30 | Romania | Helsingborg Arena, Helsingborg; Attendance: 773; Referees: Kijauskaite, Žaliene (LTU) |
| 13 December 2016; 16:15 | Luzumová 7 | (14–17) | Neagu 10 | Helsingborg Arena, Helsingborg; Attendance: 773; Referees: Kijauskaite, Žaliene (LTU) |
| 13 December 2016; 16:15 | 4× (yellow card) 5× (suspension) | Report | 3× (yellow card) 4× (suspension) | Helsingborg Arena, Helsingborg; Attendance: 773; Referees: Kijauskaite, Žaliene (LTU) |

| 13 December 2016; 18:30 | Hungary | 23–24 | Norway | Helsingborg Arena, Helsingborg; Attendance: 1,402; Referees: Jurinović, Mrvica (CRO) |
| 13 December 2016; 18:30 | Görbicz, Kovács 5 | (9–11) | Mørk 6 | Helsingborg Arena, Helsingborg; Attendance: 1,402; Referees: Jurinović, Mrvica (CRO) |
| 13 December 2016; 18:30 | 2× (yellow card) 3× (suspension) | Report | 3× (yellow card) 3× (suspension) | Helsingborg Arena, Helsingborg; Attendance: 1,402; Referees: Jurinović, Mrvica (CRO) |

| 13 December 2016; 20:45 | Denmark | 26–26 | Russia | Helsingborg Arena, Helsingborg; Attendance: 1,672; Referees: Antić, Jakovljević (SRB) |
| 13 December 2016; 20:45 | Jørgensen 7 | (13–11) | Sudakova 6 | Helsingborg Arena, Helsingborg; Attendance: 1,672; Referees: Antić, Jakovljević (SRB) |
| 13 December 2016; 20:45 | 3× (yellow card) 4× (suspension) | Report | 4× (yellow card) 4× (suspension) | Helsingborg Arena, Helsingborg; Attendance: 1,672; Referees: Antić, Jakovljević (SRB) |

| 14 December 2016; 16:15 | Hungary | 26–26 | Russia | Helsingborg Arena, Helsingborg; Attendance: 732; Referees: Kurtagic, Wetterwik (SWE) |
| 14 December 2016; 16:15 | Kovács 6 | (14–13) | Dmitrieva 7 | Helsingborg Arena, Helsingborg; Attendance: 732; Referees: Kurtagic, Wetterwik (SWE) |
| 14 December 2016; 16:15 | 3× (yellow card) 4× (suspension) | Report | 2× (yellow card) 5× (suspension) 1× (red card) | Helsingborg Arena, Helsingborg; Attendance: 732; Referees: Kurtagic, Wetterwik (SWE) |

| 14 December 2016; 18:30 | Denmark | 21–17 | Romania | Helsingborg Arena, Helsingborg; Attendance: 1,582; Referees: Marín, García (ESP) |
| 14 December 2016; 18:30 | Hansen 9 | (12–10) | Buceschi 4 | Helsingborg Arena, Helsingborg; Attendance: 1,582; Referees: Marín, García (ESP) |
| 14 December 2016; 18:30 | 3× (yellow card) 7× (suspension) 1× (red card) | Report | 3× (yellow card) 3× (suspension) | Helsingborg Arena, Helsingborg; Attendance: 1,582; Referees: Marín, García (ESP) |

| 14 December 2016; 20:45 | Czech Republic | 24–35 | Norway | Helsingborg Arena, Helsingborg; Attendance: 853; Referees: Brehmer, Skowronek (POL) |
| 14 December 2016; 20:45 | Hrbková 7 | (17–18) | Mørk 6 | Helsingborg Arena, Helsingborg; Attendance: 853; Referees: Brehmer, Skowronek (POL) |
| 14 December 2016; 20:45 | 2× (yellow card) 1× (suspension) | Report | 3× (yellow card) 1× (suspension) | Helsingborg Arena, Helsingborg; Attendance: 853; Referees: Brehmer, Skowronek (POL) |

== Knockout stage ==
=== Bracket ===
Semifinals
16 December
Netherlands | 26
Denmark | 22
16 December
France | 16
Norway | 20

Final
18 December
Netherlands | 29
Norway | 30
Third place
18 December
Denmark | 22
France | 25

=== Semifinals ===
| 16 December 2016; 18:15 | Netherlands | 26–22 | Denmark | Scandinavium, Gothenburg; Attendance: 9,853; Referees: Brunovský, Čanda (SVK) |
| 16 December 2016; 18:15 | Polman 7 | (13–13) | Jørgensen 6 | Scandinavium, Gothenburg; Attendance: 9,853; Referees: Brunovský, Čanda (SVK) |
| 16 December 2016; 18:15 | 2× (yellow card) 2× (suspension) | Report | 3× (yellow card) 3× (suspension) | Scandinavium, Gothenburg; Attendance: 9,853; Referees: Brunovský, Čanda (SVK) |

| 16 December 2016; 20:45 | France | 16–20 | Norway | Scandinavium, Gothenburg; Attendance: 9,908; Referees: Jurinović, Mrvica (CRO) |
| 16 December 2016; 20:45 | Lacrabère 6 | (9–11) | Mørk 7 | Scandinavium, Gothenburg; Attendance: 9,908; Referees: Jurinović, Mrvica (CRO) |
| 16 December 2016; 20:45 | 2× (yellow card) 1× (suspension) | Report | 3× (yellow card) 4× (suspension) | Scandinavium, Gothenburg; Attendance: 9,908; Referees: Jurinović, Mrvica (CRO) |

=== Fifth place game ===
| 16 December 2016; 15:45 | Germany | 22–23 | Romania | Scandinavium, Gothenburg; Attendance: 2,210; Referees: Arntsen, Røen (NOR) |
| 16 December 2016; 15:45 | Huber 5 | (11–11) | Zamfir 6 | Scandinavium, Gothenburg; Attendance: 2,210; Referees: Arntsen, Røen (NOR) |
| 16 December 2016; 15:45 | 3× (yellow card) 2× (suspension) | Report | 2× (yellow card) 2× (suspension) | Scandinavium, Gothenburg; Attendance: 2,210; Referees: Arntsen, Røen (NOR) |

=== Third place game ===
| 18 December 2016; 15:30 | Denmark | 22–25 | France | Scandinavium, Gothenburg; Attendance: 8,391; Referees: Florescu, Stoia (ROU) |
| 18 December 2016; 15:30 | Jørgensen 6 | (9–14) | Nze Minko 5 | Scandinavium, Gothenburg; Attendance: 8,391; Referees: Florescu, Stoia (ROU) |
| 18 December 2016; 15:30 | 2× (yellow card) 4× (suspension) 1× (red card) | Report | 2× (yellow card) 3× (suspension) | Scandinavium, Gothenburg; Attendance: 8,391; Referees: Florescu, Stoia (ROU) |

=== Final ===
| 18 December 2016; 18:00 | Netherlands | 29–30 | Norway | Scandinavium, Gothenburg; Attendance: 11,037; Referees: Alpaidze, Berezkina (RUS) |
| 18 December 2016; 18:00 | Snelder 6 | (15–15) | Mørk 12 | Scandinavium, Gothenburg; Attendance: 11,037; Referees: Alpaidze, Berezkina (RUS) |
| 18 December 2016; 18:00 | 3× (yellow card) 2× (suspension) | Report | 2× (yellow card) 2× (suspension) | Scandinavium, Gothenburg; Attendance: 11,037; Referees: Alpaidze, Berezkina (RUS) |

== Final ranking and statistics ==
| Qualified for the 2017 World Championship |

| Rank | Team |
|---|---|
| Gold medal | Norway |
| Silver medal | Netherlands |
| Bronze medal | France |
| 4 | Denmark |
| 5 | Romania |
| 6 | Germany |
| 7 | Russia |
| 8 | Sweden |
| 9 | Serbia |
| 10 | Czech Republic |
| 11 | Spain |
| 12 | Hungary |
| 13 | Montenegro |
| 14 | Slovenia |
| 15 | Poland |
| 16 | Croatia |

=== All Star Team ===
The All Star Team and awards were announced on 18 December 2016.

| Position | Player |
|---|---|
| Goalkeeper | Sandra Toft Galsgaard (DEN) |
| Left wing | Camilla Herrem (NOR) |
| Left back | Cristina Neagu (ROU) |
| Centre back | Nycke Groot (NED) |
| Right back | Nora Mørk (NOR) |
| Right wing | Carmen Martín (ESP) |
| Pivot | Yvette Broch (NED) |
| Best defense player | Béatrice Edwige (FRA) |
| Most valuable player | Nycke Groot (NED) |

=== Top goalscorers ===
| Rank | Name | Team | Goals | Shots | % |
|---|---|---|---|---|---|
| 1 | Nora Mørk | Norway | 53 | 95 | 56 |
| 2 | Stine Jørgensen | Denmark | 47 | 81 | 58 |
| 3 | Cristina Neagu | Romania | 46 | 89 | 52 |
| 4 | Estavana Polman | Netherlands | 39 | 68 | 57 |
| 5 | Svenja Huber | Germany | 35 | 58 | 60 |
| 5 | Nycke Groot | Netherlands | 35 | 53 | 66 |
| 5 | Estelle Nze Minko | France | 35 | 59 | 59 |
| 8 | Isabelle Gulldén | Sweden | 31 | 58 | 53 |
| 8 | Alexandra Lacrabère | France | 31 | 59 | 53 |
| 10 | Michaela Hrbková | Czech Republic | 30 | 56 | 54 |

=== Top goalkeepers ===
| Rank | Name | Team | % | Saves | Shots |
|---|---|---|---|---|---|
| 1 | Victoriya Kalinina | Russia | 41 | 39 | 96 |
| 1 | Silje Solberg | Norway | 41 | 68 | 164 |
| 3 | Amandine Leynaud | France | 40 | 41 | 102 |
| 4 | Laura Glauser | France | 39 | 66 | 169 |
| 4 | Silvia Navarro | Spain | 39 | 64 | 164 |
| 6 | Denisa Dedu | Romania | 38 | 56 | 146 |
| 7 | Sandra Toft Galsgaard | Denmark | 35 | 85 | 244 |
| 7 | Kari Aalvik Grimsbø | Norway | 35 | 39 | 113 |
| 7 | Clara Woltering | Germany | 35 | 76 | 217 |
| 10 | Johanna Bundsen | Sweden | 34 | 47 | 138 |
| 10 | Tess Wester | Netherlands | 34 | 95 | 281 |
