= 2016–17 Women's EHF Champions League knockout stage =

This article describes the knockout stage of the 2016–17 Women's EHF Champions League.

== Qualified teams ==
The top four placed teams from each of the two main round groups advanced to the knockout stage.

Group	First place	Second place	Third place	Fourth place
1	(North Macedonia) HC Vardar	(Hungary) FTC-Rail Cargo Hungaria	(Montenegro) Buducnost	(France) Metz Handball
2	(Hungary) Győri Audi ETO KC	(Norway) Larvik HK	(Romania) CSM București	(Denmark) Midtjylland

== Format ==
The first-placed team of each group faced the fourth-placed team, and the second-placed team played against the third-placed team from the other group. After that a draw was held to determine the pairings for the final four.

== Quarterfinals ==
=== Overview ===
Team 1	Agg.	Team 2	1st leg	2nd leg
Midtjylland (Denmark)	50–54	(North Macedonia) HC Vardar	26–28	24–26
Metz Handball (France)	54–59	(Hungary) Győri Audi ETO KC	32–31	22–28
CSM București (Romania)	57–51	(Hungary) FTC-Rail Cargo Hungaria	30–25	27–26
Buducnost (Montenegro)	66–47	(Norway) Larvik HK	31–17	35–30

=== Matches ===
9 April 2017; 17:00	Midtjylland (Denmark)	26–28	(North Macedonia) HC Vardar	Ikast-Brande Arena, Ikast; Attendance: 1,982; Referees: Horváth, Marton (HUN)
9 April 2017; 17:00	Østergaard 5	(12–18)	Penezić 7	Ikast-Brande Arena, Ikast; Attendance: 1,982; Referees: Horváth, Marton (HUN)
9 April 2017; 17:00	3× (yellow card) 6× (suspension)	Report	2× (yellow card) 7× (suspension)	Ikast-Brande Arena, Ikast; Attendance: 1,982; Referees: Horváth, Marton (HUN)

15 April 2017; 17:30	HC Vardar (North Macedonia)	26–24	(Denmark) Midtjylland	Jane Sandanski Arena, Skopje; Attendance: 3,000; Referees: Mandák, Rudinský (SVK)
15 April 2017; 17:30	Čović, Penezić 6	(11–12)	Jørgensen 6	Jane Sandanski Arena, Skopje; Attendance: 3,000; Referees: Mandák, Rudinský (SVK)
15 April 2017; 17:30	3× (yellow card) 1× (suspension)	Report	2× (yellow card) 2× (suspension)	Jane Sandanski Arena, Skopje; Attendance: 3,000; Referees: Mandák, Rudinský (SVK)

Vardar won 54–50 on aggregate.

9 April 2017; 17:00	Metz Handball (France)	32–31	(Hungary) Győri Audi ETO KC	Arènes de Metz, Metz; Attendance: 5,000; Referees: Pandžić, Mošorinski (SRB)
9 April 2017; 17:00	Gros 10	(16–16)	Mørk 10	Arènes de Metz, Metz; Attendance: 5,000; Referees: Pandžić, Mošorinski (SRB)
9 April 2017; 17:00	3× (yellow card) 5× (suspension)	Report	3× (yellow card) 2× (suspension)	Arènes de Metz, Metz; Attendance: 5,000; Referees: Pandžić, Mošorinski (SRB)

15 April 2017; 19:00	Győri Audi ETO KC (Hungary)	28–22	(France) Metz Handball	Audi Aréna, Győr; Attendance: 5,000; Referees: Florescu, Stoia (ROU)
15 April 2017; 19:00	Amorim 7	(17–12)	four players 4	Audi Aréna, Győr; Attendance: 5,000; Referees: Florescu, Stoia (ROU)
15 April 2017; 19:00	2× (yellow card) 2× (suspension)	Report	3× (yellow card) 4× (suspension)	Audi Aréna, Győr; Attendance: 5,000; Referees: Florescu, Stoia (ROU)

Győri ETO won 59–54 on aggregate.

7 April 2017; 20:00	CSM București (Romania)	30–25	(Hungary) FTC-Rail Cargo Hungaria	Polyvalent Hall, Bucharest; Attendance: 4,548; Referees: Brehmer, Skowronek (POL)
7 April 2017; 20:00	Gulldén 10	(17–15)	Kovacsics 11	Polyvalent Hall, Bucharest; Attendance: 4,548; Referees: Brehmer, Skowronek (POL)
7 April 2017; 20:00	3× (yellow card) 1× (suspension)	Report	3× (yellow card) 3× (suspension)	Polyvalent Hall, Bucharest; Attendance: 4,548; Referees: Brehmer, Skowronek (POL)

15 April 2017; 16:45	FTC-Rail Cargo Hungaria (Hungary)	26–27	(Romania) CSM București	SYMA Sports and Conference Centre, Budapest; Attendance: 4,000; Referees: Arntsen, Røen (NOR)
15 April 2017; 16:45	Jovanović 6	(15–14)	Martín 5	SYMA Sports and Conference Centre, Budapest; Attendance: 4,000; Referees: Arntsen, Røen (NOR)
15 April 2017; 16:45	3× (yellow card) 3× (suspension)	Report	4× (yellow card) 1× (suspension)	SYMA Sports and Conference Centre, Budapest; Attendance: 4,000; Referees: Arntsen, Røen (NOR)

CSM București won 57–51 on aggregate.

9 April 2017; 19:00	Buducnost (Montenegro)	31–17	(Norway) Larvik HK	Morača Sports Center, Podgorica; Attendance: 4,500; Referees: Brunovský, Čanda (SVK)
9 April 2017; 19:00	Neagu 10	(14–9)	Stange 8	Morača Sports Center, Podgorica; Attendance: 4,500; Referees: Brunovský, Čanda (SVK)
9 April 2017; 19:00	3× (yellow card) 4× (suspension)	Report	3× (yellow card) 2× (suspension)	Morača Sports Center, Podgorica; Attendance: 4,500; Referees: Brunovský, Čanda (SVK)

15 April 2017; 17:00	Larvik HK (Norway)	30–35	(Montenegro) Buducnost	Boligmappa Arena Larvik, Larvik; Attendance: 1,078; Referees: Caçador, Nicolau (POR)
15 April 2017; 17:00	Riegelhuth Koren 8	(15–16)	Neagu 9	Boligmappa Arena Larvik, Larvik; Attendance: 1,078; Referees: Caçador, Nicolau (POR)
15 April 2017; 17:00	2× (yellow card) 1× (suspension)	Report	3× (yellow card) 6× (suspension)	Boligmappa Arena Larvik, Larvik; Attendance: 1,078; Referees: Caçador, Nicolau (POR)

Buducnost won 66–47 on aggregate.

== Final four ==
The final four was held at the László Papp Budapest Sports Arena in Budapest, Hungary on 6 and 7 May 2017.

The draw was held on 18 April 2017 at 13:00 in Budapest, Hungary.

=== Bracket ===
Semifinals
6 May
(Montenegro) Budućnost	20
(Hungary) Győri Audi ETO KC	26
6 May
(Romania) CSM București	33
(North Macedonia) HC Vardar	38

Final
7 May
(Hungary) Győri Audi ETO KC (OT)	31
(North Macedonia) HC Vardar	30
Third place
7 May
(Montenegro) Budućnost	20
(Romania) CSM București	26

=== Semifinals ===
6 May 2017; 15:15	Budućnost (Montenegro)	20–26	(Hungary) Győri Audi ETO KC	László Papp Budapest Sports Arena, Budapest; Attendance: 12,000; Referees: Năstase, Stancu (ROU)
6 May 2017; 15:15	Neagu 7	(9–12)	Görbicz 9	László Papp Budapest Sports Arena, Budapest; Attendance: 12,000; Referees: Năstase, Stancu (ROU)
6 May 2017; 15:15	2× (yellow card) 2× (suspension)	Report	3× (yellow card) 5× (suspension) 1× (red card)	László Papp Budapest Sports Arena, Budapest; Attendance: 12,000; Referees: Năstase, Stancu (ROU)

6 May 2017; 17:45	CSM București (Romania)	33–38	(North Macedonia) HC Vardar	László Papp Budapest Sports Arena, Budapest; Attendance: 12,000; Referees: Alpaidze, Berezkina (RUS)
6 May 2017; 17:45	Niombla 8	(13–21)	Penezić, Radičević 7	László Papp Budapest Sports Arena, Budapest; Attendance: 12,000; Referees: Alpaidze, Berezkina (RUS)
6 May 2017; 17:45	1× (yellow card) 1× (suspension)	Report	3× (yellow card) 6× (suspension) 1× (red card)	László Papp Budapest Sports Arena, Budapest; Attendance: 12,000; Referees: Alpaidze, Berezkina (RUS)

=== Third place game ===
7 May 2017; 15:15	Budućnost (Montenegro)	20–26	(Romania) CSM București	László Papp Budapest Sports Arena, Budapest; Attendance: 12,000; Referees: Vranes, Wenninger (AUT)
7 May 2017; 15:15	Bulatović 5	(12–13)	Gulldén 9	László Papp Budapest Sports Arena, Budapest; Attendance: 12,000; Referees: Vranes, Wenninger (AUT)
7 May 2017; 15:15	2× (yellow card) 5× (suspension)	Report	1× (yellow card) 5× (suspension)	László Papp Budapest Sports Arena, Budapest; Attendance: 12,000; Referees: Vranes, Wenninger (AUT)

=== Final ===
7 May 2017
17:45
Győri Audi ETO KC (Hungary)
31–30 (ET)
(North Macedonia) HC Vardar
László Papp Budapest Sports Arena, Budapest
Attendance: 12,000
Referees: Christiansen, Hansen (DEN)
Görbicz 7
(15–12)
Althaus, Lacrabère 6
3× (yellow card) 6× (suspension)
Report
2× (yellow card) 5× (suspension)

FT: 26–26 ET: 5-4
