= 2016–17 Women's EHF Champions League =

Women championship

Women's EHF Champions League
- 2016–17

Tournament information
- Sport: Handball
- Dates: 10 September 2016–7 May 2017
- Teams: 16 (group stage); 22 (qualification)
- Website: ehfcl.com

Final positions
- Champions: (Hungary) Győri Audi ETO KC
- Runner-up: (North Macedonia) HC Vardar

Tournament statistics
- Matches played: 96
- Goals scored: 5110 (53.23 per match)
- Attendance: 295,818 (3,081 per match)
- Top scorer(s): (Croatia) Andrea Penezić (98 goals)

The 2016–17 Women's EHF Champions League was the 24th edition of the Women's EHF Champions League, the competition for top women's clubs of Europe, organized and supervised by the European Handball Federation. CSM București were defending champions.

== Team allocation ==
13 teams were directly qualified for the group stage.

Group stage
(Denmark) Team Esbjerg (1st)	(Denmark) FC Midtjylland (2nd)	(France) Metz Handball (1st)	(Germany) Thüringer HC (1st)
(Hungary) Ferencváros (2nd)	(Hungary) Győri ETO (1st)	(North Macedonia) HC Vardar (1st)	(Montenegro) Budućnost (1st)
(Norway) Larvik HK (1st)	(Romania) CSM București^{TH} (1st)	(Russia) Astrakhanochka (1st)	(Russia) Rostov-Don (2nd)
(Sweden) IK Sävehof (1st)
Qualification tournament
(Norway) Glassverket IF (2nd)	(Slovenia) Krim Ljubljana (1st)	(Poland) Selgros Lublin (1st)	(Belarus) HC Gomel (1st)
(Germany) HC Leipzig (2nd)	(Croatia) Podravka Koprivnica (1st)	(Turkey) Yenimahalle Bld. SK (1st)	(Italy) Indeco Conversano (1st)
(Austria) Hypo Niederösterreich (1st)	(Spain) Bera Bera (1st)	(Netherlands) SERCODAK Dalfsen (1st)	(Slovakia) IUVENTA Michalovce (1st)

- ^{TH = Title holders}

== Round and draw dates ==
The qualification and group stage draw will be held in Glostrup, Denmark.

Phase	Draw date
Qualification tournaments	29 June 2016
Group stage	1 July 2016
Knockout stage	1 July 2016
Final Four	18 April 2017

== Qualification stage ==
The draw was held on 29 June 2016 at 13:00 in Vienna, Austria. The twelve teams were split in three groups and played a semifinal and final to determine the last participants. Matches were played from 9 to 11 September 2016.

=== Qualification tournament 1 ===
Semifinals
10 September
(Norway) Glassverket IF	34
(Turkey) Yenimahalle Bld. SK	23
10 September
(Croatia) Podravka Koprivnica	30
(Netherlands) SERCODAK Dalfsen	17

Final
11 September
(Norway) Glassverket IF	28
(Croatia) Podravka Koprivnica	19
Third place
11 September
(Turkey) Yenimahalle Bld. SK	31
(Netherlands) SERCODAK Dalfsen	22

=== Qualification tournament 2 ===
Semifinals
9 September
(Germany) HC Leipzig	29
(Belarus) HC Gomel	18
9 September
(Austria) Hypo Niederösterreich	25
(Spain) BM Bera Bera	21

Final
10 September
(Germany) HC Leipzig	32
(Austria) Hypo Niederösterreich	30
Third place
10 September
(Belarus) HC Gomel	20
(Spain) BM Bera Bera	28

=== Qualification tournament 3 ===
Semifinals
10 September
(Slovenia) Krim	28
(Slovakia) IUVENTA Michalovce	22
10 September
(Poland) MKS Selgros Lublin	27
(Italy) Indeco Conversano	28

Final
11 September
(Slovenia) Krim	37
(Italy) Indeco Conversano	16
Third place
11 September
(Slovakia) IUVENTA Michalovce	21
(Poland) MKS Selgros Lublin	33

== Group stage ==
The draw was held on 1 July 2016 at 13:00.

In each group, teams played against each other in a double round-robin format, with home and away matches.

Tiebreakers
In the group stage, teams are ranked according to points (2 points for a win, 1 point for a draw, 0 points for a loss). After completion of the group stage, if two or more teams have scored the same number of points, the ranking will be determined as follows (article 4.3.1, section II of regulations):
1. Highest number of points in matches between the teams directly involved;
2. Superior goal difference in matches between the teams directly involved;
3. Highest number of goals scored in matches between the teams directly involved (or in the away match in case of a two-team tie);
4. Superior goal difference in all matches of the group;
5. Highest number of plus goals in all matches of the group;

If the ranking of one of these teams is determined, the above criteria are consecutively followed until the ranking of all teams is determined. If no ranking can be determined, a decision shall be obtained by EHF through drawing of lots.

During the group stage, only criteria 4–5 apply to determine the provisional ranking of teams.

=== Group A ===
Pos	Team	Pld	W	D	L	GF	GA	GD	Pts	Qualification	BUD	MET	THC	GLA
1	(Montenegro) Budućnost	6	5	0	1	158	136	+22	10	Main round	—	21–19	28–19	22–21
2	(France) Metz Handball	6	4	0	2	146	133	+13	8	Main round	28–25	—	25–18	25–19
3	(Germany) Thüringer HC	6	3	0	3	148	153	−5	6	Main round	26–32	28–25	—	24–16
4	(Norway) Glassverket IF	6	0	0	6	128	158	−30	0		23–30	22–24	27–33	—

Source: EHF
Rules for classification: Tiebreakers

=== Group B ===
Pos	Team	Pld	W	D	L	GF	GA	GD	Pts	Qualification	VAR	FER	AST	LEI
1	(North Macedonia) HC Vardar	6	5	1	0	220	148	+72	11	Main round	—	27–27	39–25	41–24
2	(Hungary) FTC-Rail Cargo Hungaria	6	4	1	1	172	154	+18	9	Main round	24–37	—	32–23	26–22
3	(Russia) HC Astrakhanochka	6	1	0	5	156	189	−33	2 (Note: Astrakhanochka 54–54 Leipzig, Astrakhanochka advanced on away goals.)	Main round	26–31	28–33	—	27–24
4	(Germany) HC Leipzig	6	1	0	5	139	196	−57	2		22–45	17–30	30–27	—

Source: EHF
Rules for classification: Tiebreakers

=== Group C ===
Pos	Team	Pld	W	D	L	GF	GA	GD	Pts	Qualification	GYO	BUC	MID	ROS
1	(Hungary) Győri Audi ETO KC	6	5	0	1	174	147	+27	10	Main round	—	33–25	31–19	32–25
2	(Romania) CSM București	6	3	0	3	142	145	−3	6 (Note: Bucharest 47–44 Midtjylland)	Main round	24–27	—	26–20	24–21
3	(Denmark) Midtjylland	6	3	0	3	135	150	−15	6	Main round	27–23	24–21	—	25–23
4	(Russia) Rostov-Don	6	1	0	5	142	151	−9	2		27–28	20–22	26–20	—

Source: EHF
Rules for classification: Tiebreakers

=== Group D ===
Pos	Team	Pld	W	D	L	GF	GA	GD	Pts	Qualification	KRI	LAR	ESB	SAV
1	(Slovenia) Krim	6	4	0	2	168	165	+3	8	Main round	—	24–22	27–22	32–29
2	(Norway) Larvik HK	6	3	0	3	174	170	+4	6 (Note: Larvik 61–53 Esbjerg)	Main round	31–36	—	30–29	22–25
3	(Denmark) Team Esbjerg	6	3	0	3	164	151	+13	6	Main round	35–25	24–31	—	29–18
4	(Sweden) IK Sävehof	6	2	0	4	150	170	−20	4		26–24	32–38	20–25	—

Source: EHF
Rules for classification: Tiebreakers

== Main round ==
The top three teams of each preliminary group advanced. Points obtained against qualified teams from the same group were carried over.

In each group, teams played against each other in a double round-robin format, with home and away matches.

=== Group 1 ===
Pos	Team	Pld	W	D	L	GF	GA	GD	Pts	Qualification	VAR	FER	BUD	MET	THC	AST
1	(North Macedonia) HC Vardar	10	7	1	2	311	279	+32	15	Quarterfinals	—	27–27	28–31	23–21	36–26	39–25
2	(Hungary) FTC-Rail Cargo Hungaria	10	6	2	2	290	265	+25	14 (Note: FTC-Rail Cargo Hungaria 56–49 Budućnost)	Quarterfinals	24–37	—	23–24	29–23	32–24	32–23
3	(Montenegro) Budućnost	10	7	0	3	286	248	+38	14	Quarterfinals	28–31	25–33	—	21–19	28–19	38–20
4	(France) Metz Handball	10	5	0	5	273	238	+35	10	Quarterfinals	42–28	25–28	28–25	—	25–18	37–18
5	(Germany) Thüringer HC	10	2	1	7	257	286	−29	5		29–31	29–29	26–32	28–25	—	34–22
6	(Russia) HC Astrakhanochka	10	1	0	9	229	330	−101	2		26–31	28–33	21–34	20–28	26–24	—

Source: EHF
Rules for classification: See Tiebreakers

=== Group 2 ===
Pos	Team	Pld	W	D	L	GF	GA	GD	Pts	Qualification	GYO	LAR	BUC	MID	KRI	ESB
1	(Hungary) Győri Audi ETO KC	10	8	1	1	305	234	+71	17	Quarterfinals	—	27–27	33–25	31–19	39–22	33–22
2	(Norway) Larvik HK	10	5	2	3	279	271	+8	12	Quarterfinals	25–26	—	35–33	24–22	31–36	30–29
3	(Romania) CSM București	10	5	1	4	265	257	+8	11	Quarterfinals	24–27	26–26	—	26–20	28–26	33–25
4	(Denmark) Midtjylland	10	5	0	5	250	241	+9	10	Quarterfinals	27–23	24–28	24–21	—	28–19	38–26
5	(Slovenia) Krim	10	3	0	7	238	290	−52	6		17–34	24–22	21–24	21–27	—	27–22
6	(Denmark) Team Esbjerg	10	2	0	8	251	295	−44	4		26–32	24–31	20–25	22–21	35–25	—

Source: EHF
Rules for classification: See Tiebreakers

== Knockout stage ==
The first four placed teams from the main round qualified for the knockout stage.

=== Quarterfinals ===
Team 1	Agg.	Team 2	1st leg	2nd leg
Midtjylland (Denmark)	50–54	(North Macedonia) HC Vardar	26–28	24–26
Metz Handball (France)	54–59	(Hungary) Győri Audi ETO KC	32–31	22–28
CSM București (Romania)	57–51	(Hungary) FTC-Rail Cargo Hungaria	30–25	27–26
Buducnost (Montenegro)	66–47	(Norway) Larvik HK	31–17	35–30

=== Final four ===
Semifinals
6 May
(Montenegro) Budućnost	20
(Hungary) Győri Audi ETO KC	26
6 May
(Romania) CSM București	33
(North Macedonia) HC Vardar	38

Final
7 May
(Hungary) Győri Audi ETO KC (OT)	31
(North Macedonia) HC Vardar	30
Third place
7 May
(Montenegro) Budućnost	20
(Romania) CSM București	26

==== Final ====
7 May 2017
17:45
Győri Audi ETO KC (Hungary)
31–30 (ET)
(North Macedonia) HC Vardar
László Papp Budapest Sports Arena, Budapest
Attendance: 12,000
Referees: Christiansen, Hansen (DEN)
Görbicz 7
(15–12)
Althaus, Lacrabère 6
3× (yellow card) 6× (suspension)
Report
2× (yellow card) 5× (suspension)

FT: 26–26 ET: 5-4

== Awards and statistics ==
=== All-Star Team ===
The all-star team and awards were announced on 5 May 2017.

- Goalkeeper: Kari Aalvik Grimsbø (NOR)
- Right wing: Carmen Martín (ESP)
- Right back: Nora Mørk (NOR)
- Centre back: Nycke Groot (NED)
- Left back: Cristina Neagu (ROU)
- Left wing: Camilla Herrem (NOR)
- Pivot: Marit Malm Frafjord (NOR)

=== Other awards ===
- MVP of the Final Four: Nycke Groot (NED)
- Best Coach: Ambros Martín (ESP)
- Best Young Player: Blanka Bíró (HUN)
- Best Defence Player: Eduarda Amorim (BRA)
- Top scorer: Andrea Penezić (CRO), 98 goals
