= Jenny Alm =

Swedish handball player (born 1989)

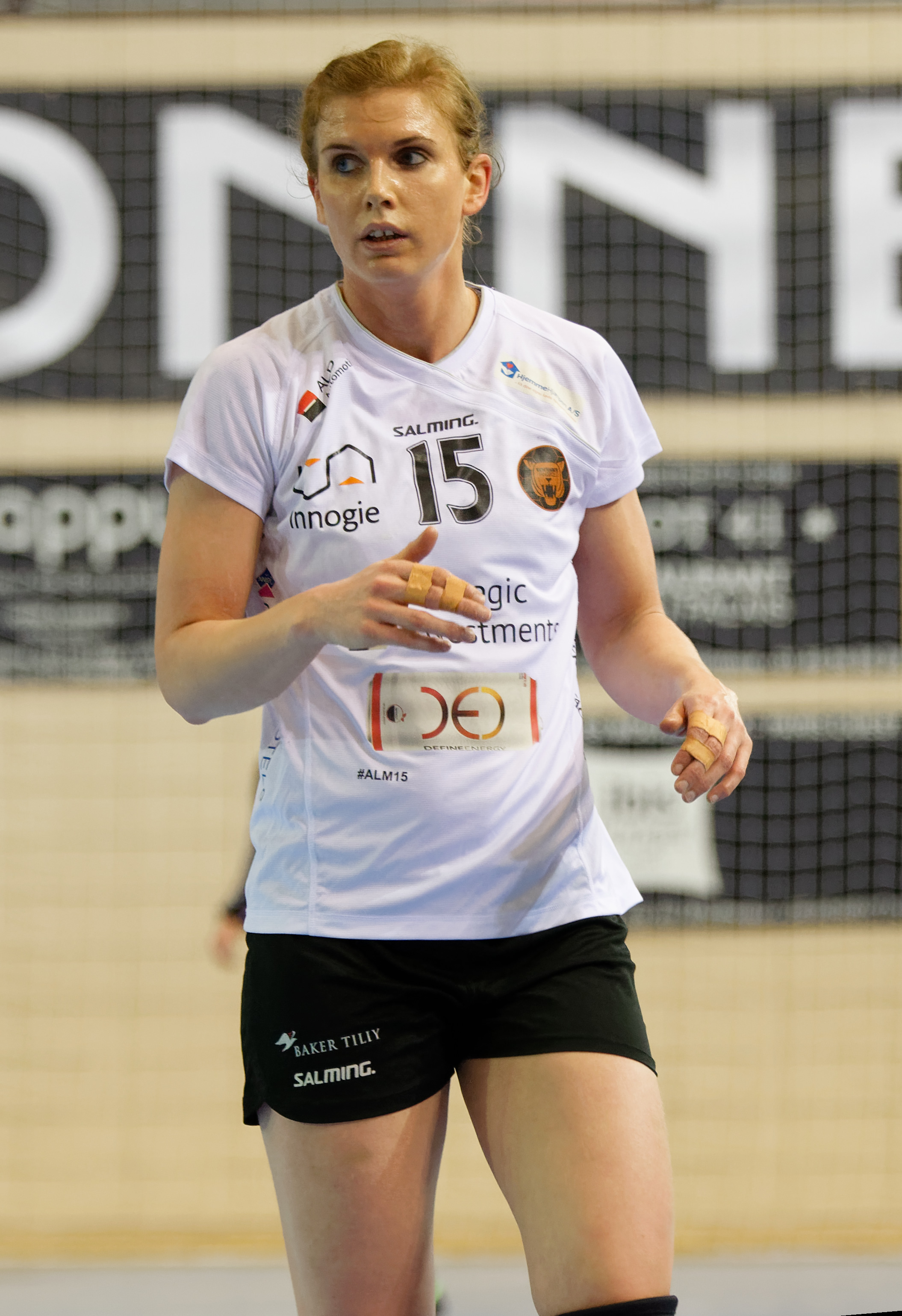
- Alm in 2018

Personal information
- Full name: Jenny Sofia Alm
- Nationality: Swedish
- Born: 10 April 1989 (age 37) Uddevalla, Sweden
- Height: 1.84 m (6 ft 0 in)

Sport
- Sport: Handball
- Position: Left back
- Current club: København Håndbold
- Number: 15

Senior clubs
- Years: Team
- -2011: GF Kroppskultur
- 2011–2015: IK Sävehof
- 2015–2017: Team Esbjerg
- 2017–2019: København Håndbold
National team
Years	Team	Apps	(Gls)
2010–2018	Sweden	123	(285)
Medal record
European Championship
Bronze medal – third place	2014 Croatia/Hungary

Jenny Sofia Alm (born 10 April 1989) is a Swedish former handball player who played the Swedish national team.

== Career ==
Alm started her career at GF Kroppskultur. In 2008 she helped the team getting promoted to the Elitserien. In the 2009-10 season she was the top scorer in the Elitserien.

In 2011 she joined IK Sävehof. With Sävehof she won the Swedish Championship in 2012, 2013, 2014 and 2015.

In 2015 she joined Danish side Team Esbjerg. She was part of the Team Esbjerg side that won the 2015-16 Damehåndboldligaen, the first national championship in club history.

In 2017 she joined København Håndbold. She retired after the 2018-19 season. After her playing career, she has joined the backroom staff at IK Sävehof as the masseuse.

=== National team ===
She participated at the 2011 World Women's Handball Championship in Brazil. She missed the 2012 European Championship due to injury. She was back in the Swedish team for the 2024 European Women's Handball Championship, where Sweden won bronze medals.

She then went on to represented Sweden at the 2016 Olympics, 2016 European Championship, 2017 World Championship and 2018 European Championship.

== Private ==
Her sister, Frida Alm, also played handball for GF Kroppskultur.
