= Laura van der Heijden (handballer) =

Dutch handball player (born 1990)

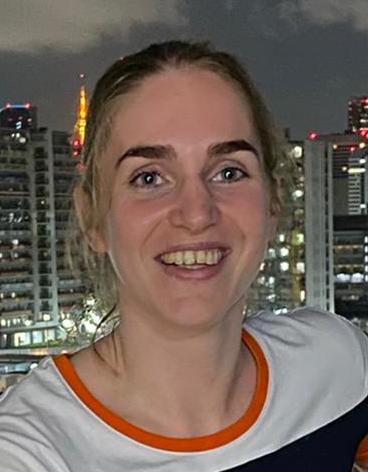
- Van der Heijden at the 2020 Summer Olympics

Personal information
- Nationality: Dutch
- Born: 27 June 1990 (age 36) Amersfoort, Netherlands
- Height: 1.72 m (5 ft 8 in)

Sport
- Sport: Handball
- Position: Right back
- Current club: Chambray Touraine Handball
- Number: 11

Senior clubs
- Years: Team
- –: LHV Leusden
- –: Venus Nieuwegein
- –2010: VOC Amsterdam
- 2010–2014: VfL Oldenburg
- 2014–2017: Team Esbjerg
- 2017–2018: Ferencvárosi TC
- 2018–2020: SG BBM Bietigheim
- 2020: Siófok KC
- 2020–2022: Borussia Dortmund
- 2022–2024: Chambray Touraine Handball
National team
Years	Team	Apps	(Gls)
2007–2024	Netherlands	297	(875)
Medal record
World Championship
Gold medal – first place	2019 Japan
Silver medal – second place	2015 Denmark
Bronze medal – third place	2017 Germany
European Championship
Silver medal – second place	2016 Sweden
Bronze medal – third place	2018 France

Laura van der Heijden (born 27 June 1990) is a Dutch handball player for Chambray Touraine Handball in France and formerly the Dutch national team.

She was a part the Netherlands team that won the 2019 World Women's Handball Championship; the first title in the country's history.

== Career ==
=== Club ===
Laura van der Heijden started playing handball at the age of six, first at LHV Leusden in The Netherlands. She later played for Venus Nieuwegein and VOC Amsterdam, with whom she won the 2010 Dutch Championship and 2010 Dutch Cup.

From 2006 to 2010 she also played for the Dutch HandbalAcademie.

In season 2010/11, the 1.73-meter-tall (5.7 ft) right back (left-handed) player played in the German Bundesliga for VfL Oldenburg, with whom she won the DHB Cup in 2012. Van der Heijden reached the semifinals of the EHF Cup 2010/11 with Oldenburg.

From the summer of 2014 she played for the Danish top league side Team Esbjerg. In 2015 she was runner-up and in 2016 she won the first Danish Championship in club history as well as the Super Cup.

In the 2017/18 season, van der Heijden was under contract with the Hungarian club FTC Rail Cargo Hungaria, with whom she became Hungarian runner-up.

She then moved to the German Bundesliga club SG BBM Bietigheim. With Bietigheim she won the German championship in 2019. In the summer of 2020 she signed for the Hungarian first division club Siófok KC, but already at the end of October the same year, her contract was terminated by mutual agreement. Shortly thereafter she joined the German Bundesligaclub Borussia Dortmund. With Dortmund she won the German championship in 2021 and in 2022 she became runner-up.

From the 2022/23 season she is under contract with the French first division club Chambray Touraine Handball.

=== International career ===
Van der Heijden has played 263 international matches for the Dutch national team, scoring 810 goals.

She debuted for the Dutch senior team on October 16th 2007. She competed in the 2011, 2013, 2015, 2017, 2019 and 2021 World Championships.

With the Netherlands she took also part in the European Championships 2010, 2014, 2016, 2018 and 2020.

She took part with the Dutch selection at the Olympic Games in Rio de Janeiro (2016) and in Tokyo 2020 (2021).

Van der Heijden won the silver medal at the 2015 World Championships and the 2016 European Championships, and the bronze medal at the 2017 World Championships and the 2018 European Championships. She previously won the bronze medal at the European U-17 Championship (2007). At the 2010 U-20 World Cup in South Korea, van der Heijden finished fifth with her team and finished second in Topscoring list.

At the 2019 World Championship in Japan she won gold medals with the Dutch team, beating Spain in the final 30:29
