= Michaela Hrbková =

Czech handball player

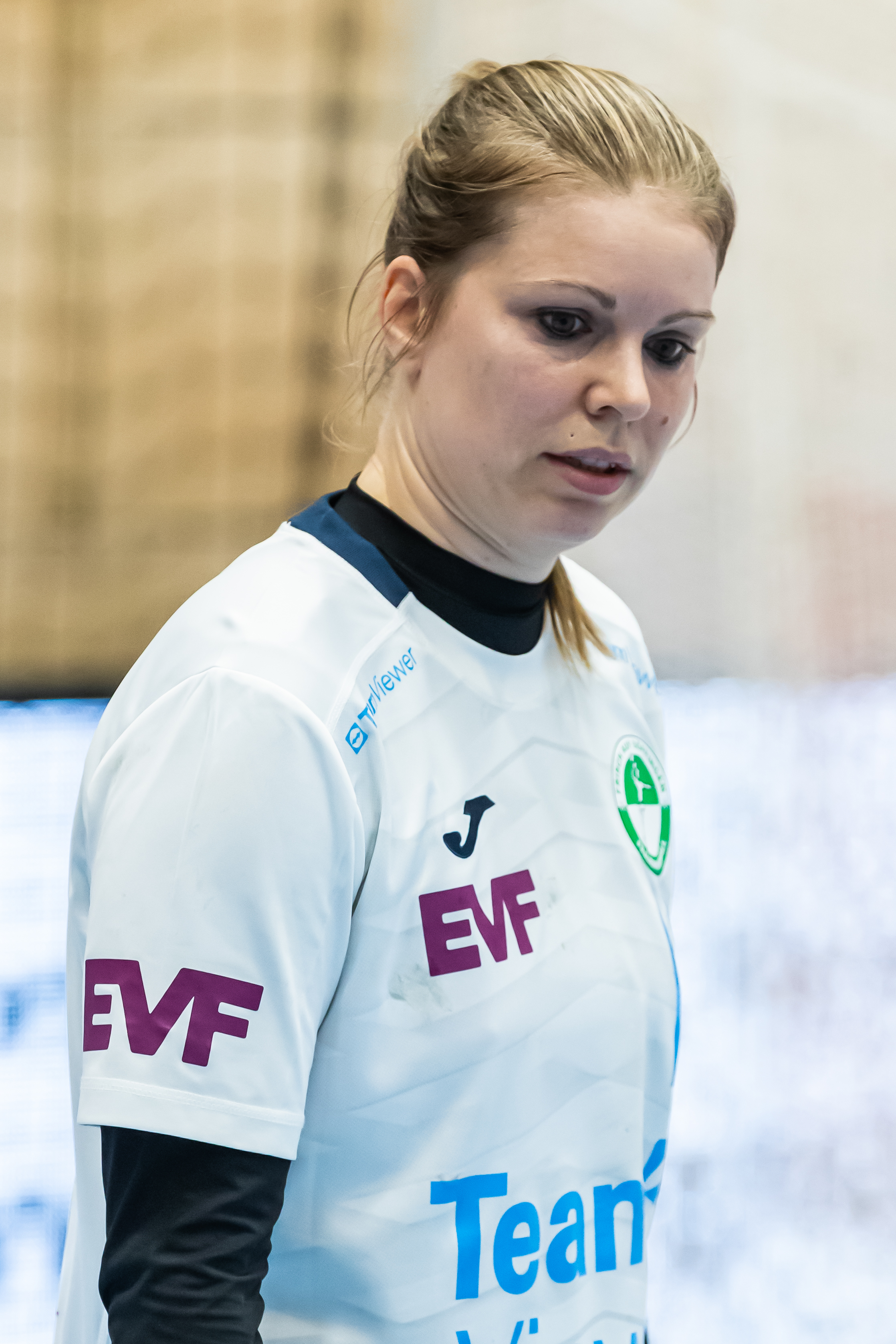

Personal information
- Nationality: Czech
- Born: 14 July 1987 (age 39) Olomouc, Czechoslovakia
- Height: 1.70 m (5 ft 7 in)

Sport
- Sport: Handball
- Position: Right back
- Current club: Frisch Auf Göppingen
- Number: 10

Senior clubs
- Years: Team
- 2006–2010: DHK Zora Olomouc
- 2010–2014: DHC Sokol Poruba
- 2014: RK Podravka Koprivnica
- 2015: Frisch Auf Göppingen
- 2015–2016: Siófok KC
- 2016–: Frisch Auf Göppingen
National team
Years	Team	Apps	(Gls)
–	Czech Republic	138	(339)

Michaela Hrbková (born 14 July 1987) is a Czech handball player for Frisch Auf Göppingen and the Czech national team.
