= Line Bjørnsen =

Norwegian handball player (born 1992)

Personal information
- Nationality: Norwegian
- Born: 3 July 1992 (age 34) Stavanger, Norway
- Height: 1.79 m (5 ft 10 in)

Sport
- Sport: Handball
- Position: Right wing

Senior clubs
- Years: Team
- –2015: Stabæk IF
- 2015–2017: Glassverket IF
- 2017–2019: København Håndbold
Medal record
Youth World Championship
Silver medal – second place	2010 Dominican Republic

Line Bjørnsen (born 3 July 1992) is a former Norwegian handball player, who last played for København Håndbold.

She is a younger sister of international handballer Kristian Bjørnsen.

She also represented Norway in the 2011 Women's Junior European Handball Championship, placing 12th, and in the 2012 Women's Junior World Handball Championship, placing 8th.

== Achievements ==
- Norwegian League:
  - Bronze Medalist: 2015/2016
- Norwegian Cup:
  - Silver Medalist: 2016
- World Youth Championship:
  - Silver Medalist: 2010

== Individual awards ==
- All-Star Right Wing of Grundigligaen: 2016/2017
