= Karina Sabirova =

Russian-Kazakhstani handball player

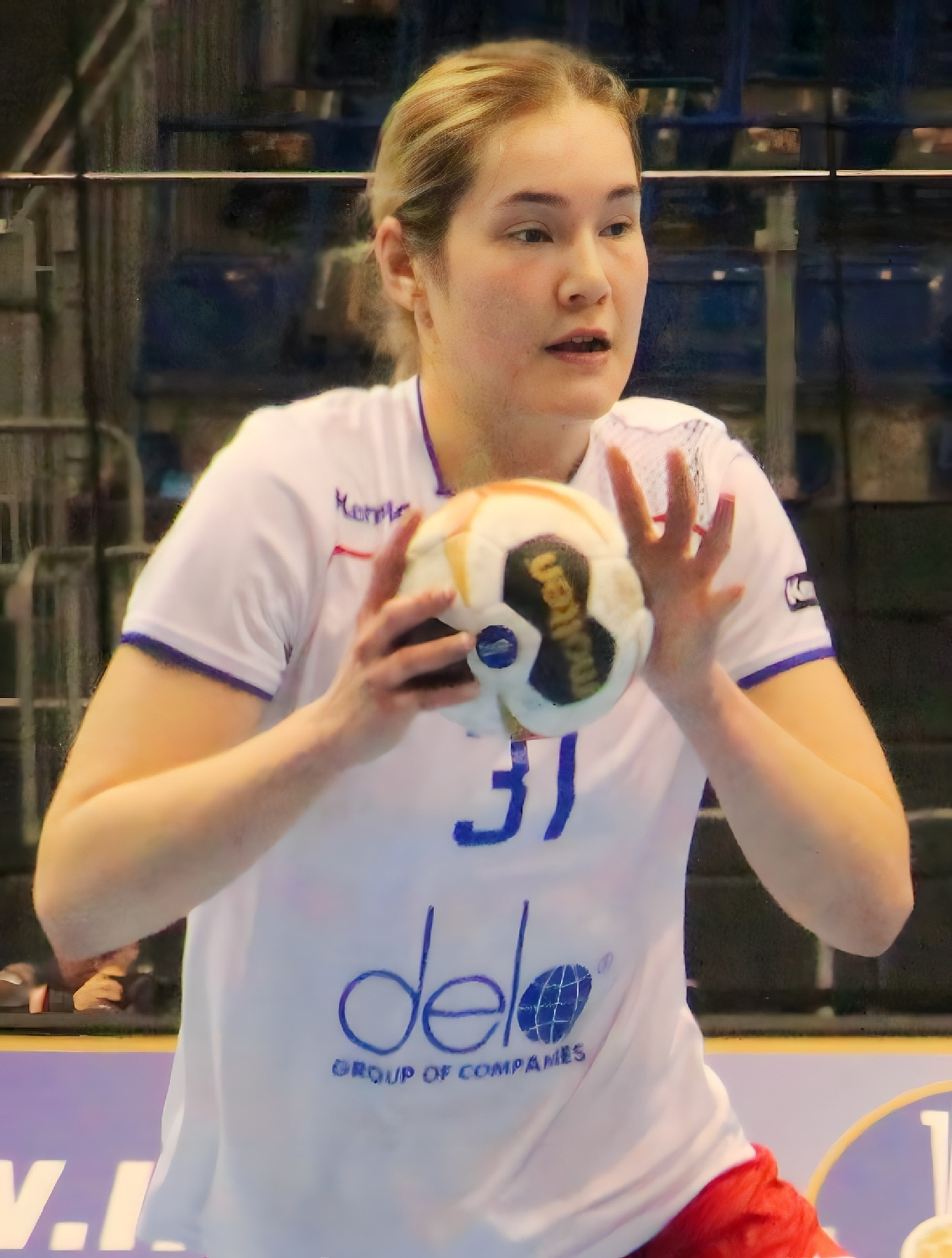

Personal information
- Full name: Karina Ibragimovna Sabirova
- Nationality: Russian
- Born: 23 March 1998 (age 28) Astrakhan, Russia
- Height: 1.80 m (5 ft 11 in)

Sport
- Sport: Handball
- Position: Centre back
- Current club: CSKA Moscow
- Number: 25

Senior clubs
- Years: Team
- 2013–2021: HC Astrakhanochka
- 2021–: CSKA Moscow
National team
Years	Team	Apps	(Gls)
–	Russia	27	(41)
Medal record
Youth World Championship
Gold medal – first place	2016 Slovakia
European U-17 Championship
Silver medal – second place	2015 Macedonia
European Youth Championship
Silver medal – second place	2013 Poland
Youth Olympic Games
Silver medal – second place	2014 Nanjing

Karina Ibragimovna Sabirova (Kazakh: Карина Ибраһимқызы Сабырова; born 23 March 1998) is a Russian-Kazakh handballer for CSKA Moscow and the Russian national team.

== Achievements ==
- Russian Super League:
  - Winner: 2016

== Individual awards ==
- All-Star Left Back of the European U-17 Championship: 2015
- MVP of the IHF Youth World Championship: 2016
