= Anne Hubinger =

German handball player (born 1993)

Personal information
- Nationality: German
- Born: 31 July 1993 (age 33) Ribnitz-Damgarten, Germany
- Height: 1.85 m (6 ft 1 in)

Sport
- Sport: Handball
- Position: Right back
- Current club: Retired

Youth career
- Years: Team
- 2001–2006: SV Motor Barth
- 2006–: HSC 2000 Magdeburg

Senior clubs
- Years: Team
- –2011: HSC 2000 Magdeburg
- 2011–2017: HC Leipzig
- 2017–2019: Thüringer HC
National team
Years	Team	Apps	(Gls)
2012–2019	Germany	62	(108)

Anne Hubinger (born 31 July 1993) is a German former handball player who played the German national team.

== Achievements ==
- Handball-Bundesliga Frauen:
  - Winner: 2018
