= Aneta Benko =

Croatian handball player (born 1985)

Personal information
- Nationality: Croatian
- Born: 29 July 1985 (age 41) Zagreb, SR Croatia, SFR Yugoslavia
- Height: 1.74 m (5 ft 9 in)

Sport
- Sport: Handball
- Position: Right wing

Senior clubs
- Years: Team
- 2005–2011: RK Lokomotiva Zagreb
- 2011–2013: ŽRK Zaječar
- 2013–2016: RK Lokomotiva Zagreb
- 2016–2018: RK Krim
- 2018–2019: Kisvárdai KC
- 2019–2020: RK Podravka Koprivnica
National team
Years	Team	Apps	(Gls)
–	Croatia	30	(58)

Aneta Benko (née Peraica; born 29 July 1985) is a retired Croatian handball player who last played for RK Podravka Koprivnica and the Croatian national team.
