= Carmen Martín =

Spanish handball player (born 1988)

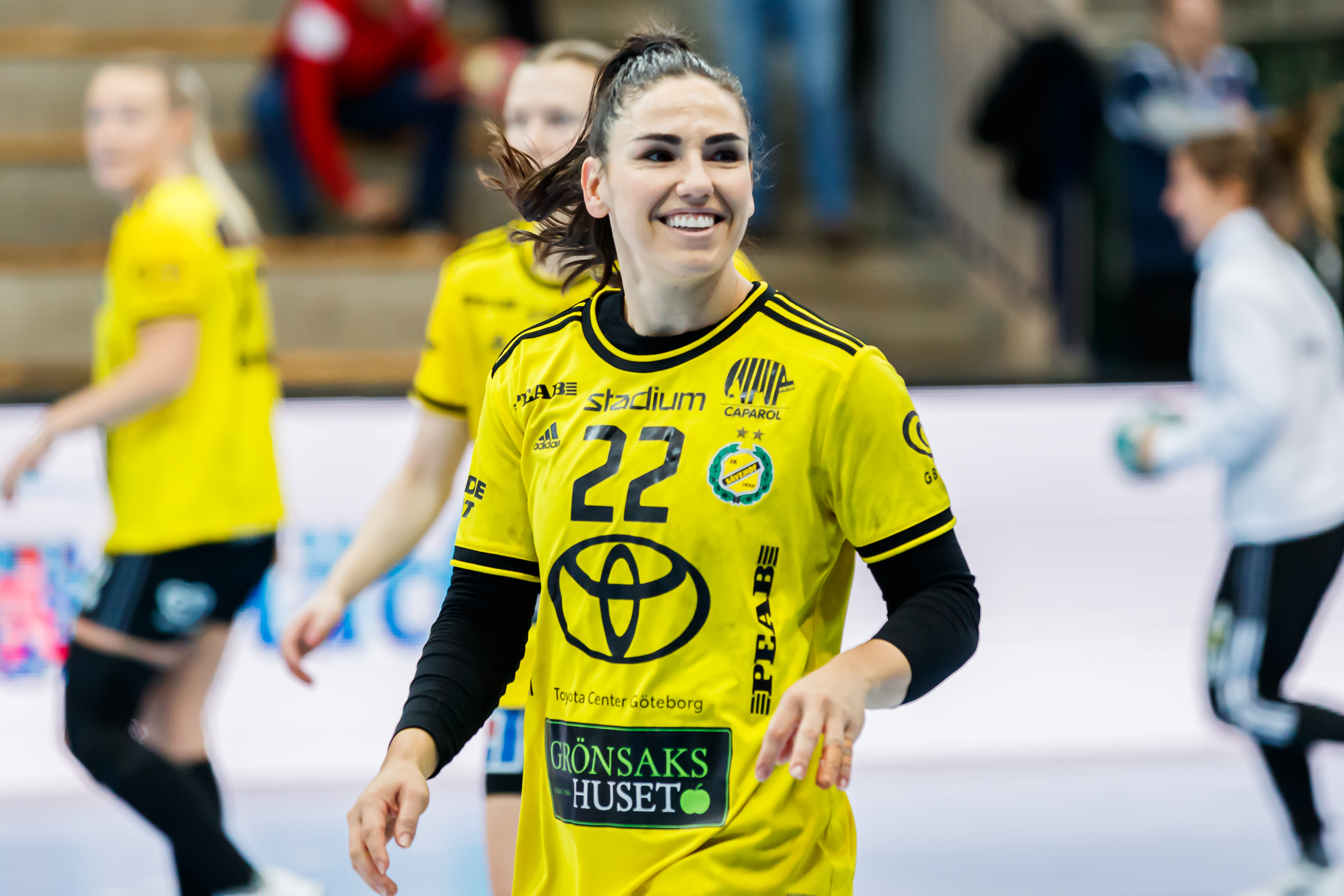
- Carmen Martín in 2022

Personal information
- Full name: Carmen Dolores Martín Berenguer
- Born: 29 May 1988 (age 38) Almería, Spain
- Height: 1.69 m (5 ft 7 in)

Sport
- Sport: Handball
- Position: Right wing
- Current club: Retired

Senior clubs
- Years: Team
- 2005–2008: BM Roquetas
- 2008–2010: CB Mar Alicante
- 2010–2012: SD Itxako
- 2012–2014: RK Krim
- 2014: CB Atlético Guardés
- 2014–2017: CSM București
- 2017–2019: Nice Handball
- 2019–2022: CSM București
- 2022–2024: IK Sävehof
National team
Years	Team	Apps	(Gls)
2005–2022	Spain	250	(866)
Medal record
Olympic Games
Bronze medal – third place	2012 London	Team
World Championship
Bronze medal – third place	2011 Brazil
European Championship
Silver medal – second place	2008 Macedonia
Silver medal – second place	2014 Croatia/Hungary

Carmen Dolores Martín Berenguer (born 29 May 1988) is a retired Spanish handballer who last played for IK Sävehof and formerly the Spanish national team.

Martín has three All-European Championship first team selections, one All-World Championship first team selection and also one All-EHF Champions League first team selection. In 2016, she won the Champions League with CSM București.

In 2016, she was made 'honorary citizen' of Bucharest.

== Achievements ==
- Spanish Championship:
  - Winner: 2011, 2012
- Spanish Queen's Cup:
  - Winner: 2011, 2012
- Spanish Supercup:
  - Winner: 2011, 2012
- Slovenian Championship:
  - Winner: 2013
- Slovenian Cup:
  - Winner: 2013
- Romanian Championship:
  - Winner: 2015, 2016, 2017
- Romanian Cup:
  - Winner: 2016
- Swedish Championship:
  - Winner: 2023
- Swedish Cup:
  - Winner: 2023, 2024
- Olympic Games:
  - Bronze Medalist: 2012
- World Championship:
  - Bronze Medalist: 2011
- European Championship:
  - Silver Medalist: 2008, 2014
- EHF Champions League:
  - Winner: 2016
  - Silver Medalist: 2011
  - Bronze Medalist: 2017

== Awards and recognition ==
- All-Star Right Wing of the World Championship: 2011
- All-Star Right Wing of the European Championship: 2014, 2016, 2018
- Handball-Planet.com Best Right Wing: 2016
- All-Star Right Wing of the EHF Champions League: 2017
- Prosport All-Star Right Wing of the Romanian Liga Națională: 2017
- All-Star Right Wing of the Romanian League: 2021
