= 2014–15 Women's EHF Champions League group stage =

This article describes the group stage of the 2014–15 Women's EHF Champions League.

== Format ==
The 16 teams were drawn into four groups of four teams, where they played each other twice. The top three teams advanced to the main round. The draw took place on 27 June 2014, at 18:00 local time, in Vienna, Austria.

== Seedings ==
The seedings were published on 23 June 2014.

Pot 1	Pot 2	Pot 3	Pot 4
(Hungary) Győri Audi ETO KC (Montenegro) ŽRK Budućnost (Norway) Larvik HK (Slovenia) RK Krim	(Denmark) Viborg HK (Romania) HCM Baia Mare (Germany) Thüringer HC (Russia) Dinamo Volgograd	(North Macedonia) ŽRK Vardar (France) Metz Handball (Austria) Hypo Niederösterreich (Croatia) RK Lokomotiva Zagreb	(Sweden) IK Sävehof (Poland) SPR Lublin SSA (Germany) HC Leipzig (Croatia) RK Koprivnica

Key to colours in group tables
Top three placed teams advanced to the main round
Fourth-placed teams entered the Cup Winners' Cup last 16

== Group A ==
Team	Pld	W	D	L	GF	GA	GD	Pts
(Russia) Dinamo Volgograd	6	4	1	1	160	143	+17	9
(Germany) HC Leipzig	6	4	0	2	177	152	+25	8
(Slovenia) Krim	6	2	0	4	162	165	−3	4
(Austria) Hypo Niederösterreich	6	1	1	4	136	175	−39	3

17 October 2014; 19:00	Krim (Slovenia)	32–20	(Austria) Hypo Niederösterreich	Arena Stožice, Ljubljana; Attendance: 1,500; Referees: Marin, García (ESP)
17 October 2014; 19:00	Bajramoska 8	(15–12)	Aćimović, Goricanec 4	Arena Stožice, Ljubljana; Attendance: 1,500; Referees: Marin, García (ESP)
17 October 2014; 19:00	3× (yellow card) 3× (suspension)	Report	3× (yellow card) 4× (suspension)	Arena Stožice, Ljubljana; Attendance: 1,500; Referees: Marin, García (ESP)

18 October 2014; 16:30	Dinamo Volgograd (Russia)	27–19	(Germany) HC Leipzig	Sport Hall "Dinamo", Volgograd; Attendance: 1,500; Referees: Krkačev, Kolevski (MKD)
18 October 2014; 16:30	Dmitrieva 9	(16–10)	Kudłacz 10	Sport Hall "Dinamo", Volgograd; Attendance: 1,500; Referees: Krkačev, Kolevski (MKD)
18 October 2014; 16:30	3× (yellow card) 4× (suspension)	Report	3× (yellow card) 5× (suspension)	Sport Hall "Dinamo", Volgograd; Attendance: 1,500; Referees: Krkačev, Kolevski (MKD)

25 October 2014; 20:25	Hypo Niederösterreich (Austria)	25–25	(Russia) Dinamo Volgograd	Bundessport- und Freizeitzentrum Südstadt, Maria Enzersdorf; Attendance: 720; Referees: Vujačić, Kazanegra (MNE)
25 October 2014; 20:25	da Rocha 7	(15–14)	Dmitrieva, Kochetova 6	Bundessport- und Freizeitzentrum Südstadt, Maria Enzersdorf; Attendance: 720; Referees: Vujačić, Kazanegra (MNE)
25 October 2014; 20:25	3× (yellow card) 1× (suspension)	Report	3× (yellow card) 1× (suspension)	Bundessport- und Freizeitzentrum Südstadt, Maria Enzersdorf; Attendance: 720; Referees: Vujačić, Kazanegra (MNE)

26 October 2014; 14:30	HC Leipzig (Germany)	30–24	(Slovenia) Krim	Arena Leipzig, Leipzig; Attendance: 2,198; Referees: Năstase, Stancu (ROU)
26 October 2014; 14:30	Kudłacz 8	(17–11)	Koren 7	Arena Leipzig, Leipzig; Attendance: 2,198; Referees: Năstase, Stancu (ROU)
26 October 2014; 14:30	2× (yellow card) 2× (suspension)	Report	2× (yellow card) 6× (suspension)	Arena Leipzig, Leipzig; Attendance: 2,198; Referees: Năstase, Stancu (ROU)

31 October 2014; 14:30	HC Leipzig (Germany)	42–22	(Austria) Hypo Niederösterreich	Arena Leipzig, Leipzig; Attendance: 2,211; Referees: Opava, Válek (CZE)
31 October 2014; 14:30	Lang, Mazzucco 9	(20–11)	Aćimović 8	Arena Leipzig, Leipzig; Attendance: 2,211; Referees: Opava, Válek (CZE)
31 October 2014; 14:30	2× (yellow card) 2× (suspension)	Report	3× (yellow card) 3× (suspension)	Arena Leipzig, Leipzig; Attendance: 2,211; Referees: Opava, Válek (CZE)

1 November 2014; 14:00	Dinamo Volgograd (Russia)	25–26	(Slovenia) Krim	Sport Hall "Dinamo", Volgograd; Attendance: 1,500; Referees: Antić, Jakovljević (SRB)
1 November 2014; 14:00	Kochetova 6	(15–13)	Bajramoska 8	Sport Hall "Dinamo", Volgograd; Attendance: 1,500; Referees: Antić, Jakovljević (SRB)
1 November 2014; 14:00	3× (yellow card) 4× (suspension)	Report	3× (yellow card) 4× (suspension)	Sport Hall "Dinamo", Volgograd; Attendance: 1,500; Referees: Antić, Jakovljević (SRB)

9 November 2014; 17:10	Hypo Niederösterreich (Austria)	18–24	(Germany) HC Leipzig	Bundessport- und Freizeitzentrum Südstadt, Maria Enzersdorf; Attendance: 700; Referees: Tzaferopoulos, Bethmann (GRE)
9 November 2014; 17:10	Aćimović 8	(7–12)	Kudłacz 5	Bundessport- und Freizeitzentrum Südstadt, Maria Enzersdorf; Attendance: 700; Referees: Tzaferopoulos, Bethmann (GRE)
9 November 2014; 17:10	3× (yellow card) 4× (suspension)	Report	3× (yellow card) 1× (suspension)	Bundessport- und Freizeitzentrum Südstadt, Maria Enzersdorf; Attendance: 700; Referees: Tzaferopoulos, Bethmann (GRE)

9 November 2014; 19:00	Krim (Slovenia)	24–26	(Russia) Dinamo Volgograd	Arena Stožice, Ljubljana; Attendance: 1,500; Referees: Bonaventura, Bonaventura (FRA)
9 November 2014; 19:00	Bajramoska 8	(13–12)	Kochetova 11	Arena Stožice, Ljubljana; Attendance: 1,500; Referees: Bonaventura, Bonaventura (FRA)
9 November 2014; 19:00	3× (yellow card) 4× (suspension)	Report	2× (yellow card) 4× (suspension)	Arena Stožice, Ljubljana; Attendance: 1,500; Referees: Bonaventura, Bonaventura (FRA)

15 November 2014; 17:25	Hypo Niederösterreich (Austria)	29–25	(Slovenia) Krim	Bundessport- und Freizeitzentrum Südstadt, Maria Enzersdorf; Attendance: 630; Referees: Covalciuc, Covalciuc (MDA)
15 November 2014; 17:25	Aćimović 11	(13–14)	Bajramoska 8	Bundessport- und Freizeitzentrum Südstadt, Maria Enzersdorf; Attendance: 630; Referees: Covalciuc, Covalciuc (MDA)
15 November 2014; 17:25	3× (yellow card) 5× (suspension)	Report	2× (yellow card) 3× (suspension)	Bundessport- und Freizeitzentrum Südstadt, Maria Enzersdorf; Attendance: 630; Referees: Covalciuc, Covalciuc (MDA)

16 November 2014; 14:30	HC Leipzig (Germany)	27–30	(Russia) Dinamo Volgograd	Arena Leipzig, Leipzig; Attendance: 2,583; Referees: Arntsen, Røen (NOR)
16 November 2014; 14:30	Lang 10	(14–14)	Akopian 9	Arena Leipzig, Leipzig; Attendance: 2,583; Referees: Arntsen, Røen (NOR)
16 November 2014; 14:30	2× (yellow card) 5× (suspension) 1× (red card)	Report	2× (yellow card) 4× (suspension)	Arena Leipzig, Leipzig; Attendance: 2,583; Referees: Arntsen, Røen (NOR)

21 November 2014; 18:45	Krim (Slovenia)	31–35	(Germany) HC Leipzig	Arena Stožice, Ljubljana; Attendance: 1,000; Referees: Horváth, Marton (HUN)
21 November 2014; 18:45	Mavsar 10	(17–18)	Kudłacz, Lang 9	Arena Stožice, Ljubljana; Attendance: 1,000; Referees: Horváth, Marton (HUN)
21 November 2014; 18:45	3× (yellow card) 4× (suspension) 1× (red card)	Report	2× (yellow card) 2× (suspension)	Arena Stožice, Ljubljana; Attendance: 1,000; Referees: Horváth, Marton (HUN)

23 November 2014; 14:00	Dinamo Volgograd (Russia)	27–22	(Austria) Hypo Niederösterreich	Sport Hall "Dinamo", Volgograd; Attendance: 1,300; Referees: Florescu, Stoia (ROU)
23 November 2014; 14:00	Kochetova 6	(13–9)	Aćimović 9	Sport Hall "Dinamo", Volgograd; Attendance: 1,300; Referees: Florescu, Stoia (ROU)
23 November 2014; 14:00	3× (yellow card) 2× (suspension)	Report	3× (yellow card) 3× (suspension)	Sport Hall "Dinamo", Volgograd; Attendance: 1,300; Referees: Florescu, Stoia (ROU)

== Group B ==
Team	Pld	W	D	L	GF	GA	GD	Pts
(Montenegro) Budućnost	6	5	1	0	161	130	+31	11
(North Macedonia) Vardar	6	3	1	2	149	140	+9	7
(Germany) Thüringer HC	6	3	0	3	143	144	−1	6
(Croatia) Podravka Koprivnica	6	0	0	6	152	191	−39	0

19 October 2014; 14:30	Thüringer HC (Germany)	33–20	(Croatia) Podravka Koprivnica	Wiedigsburghalle, Nordhausen; Attendance: 1,558; Referees: Brehmer, Skowronek (POL)
19 October 2014; 14:30	Engel, Nadgornaja 9	(14–11)	Tatari 6	Wiedigsburghalle, Nordhausen; Attendance: 1,558; Referees: Brehmer, Skowronek (POL)
19 October 2014; 14:30	2× (yellow card) 5× (suspension)	Report	2× (yellow card) 4× (suspension) 1× (red card)	Wiedigsburghalle, Nordhausen; Attendance: 1,558; Referees: Brehmer, Skowronek (POL)

19 October 2014; 19:00	Budućnost (Montenegro)	23–17	(North Macedonia) Vardar	Morača Sports Center, Podgorica; Attendance: 5,000; Referees: Pandzić, Mosorinski (SRB)
19 October 2014; 19:00	Pavićević 7	(12–9)	Penezić 5	Morača Sports Center, Podgorica; Attendance: 5,000; Referees: Pandzić, Mosorinski (SRB)
19 October 2014; 19:00	3× (yellow card) 3× (suspension)	Report	2× (yellow card) 3× (suspension)	Morača Sports Center, Podgorica; Attendance: 5,000; Referees: Pandzić, Mosorinski (SRB)

25 October 2014; 18:00	Podravka Koprivnica (Croatia)	27–32	(Montenegro) Budućnost	Gymnasium Fran Galović, Koprivnica; Attendance: 1,300; Referees: Florescu, Duţă (ROU)
25 October 2014; 18:00	Tatari 9	(14–18)	Neagu 8	Gymnasium Fran Galović, Koprivnica; Attendance: 1,300; Referees: Florescu, Duţă (ROU)
25 October 2014; 18:00	3× (yellow card) 2× (suspension)	Report	3× (yellow card) 4× (suspension)	Gymnasium Fran Galović, Koprivnica; Attendance: 1,300; Referees: Florescu, Duţă (ROU)

25 October 2014; 19:00	Vardar (North Macedonia)	26–21	(Germany) Thüringer HC	Jane Sandanski Arena, Skopje; Attendance: 2,000; Referees: Bonaventura, Bonaventura (FRA)
25 October 2014; 19:00	Penezić 8	(12–10)	Mietzner 6	Jane Sandanski Arena, Skopje; Attendance: 2,000; Referees: Bonaventura, Bonaventura (FRA)
25 October 2014; 19:00	2× (yellow card) 6× (suspension)	Report	3× (yellow card) 3× (suspension)	Jane Sandanski Arena, Skopje; Attendance: 2,000; Referees: Bonaventura, Bonaventura (FRA)

2 November 2014; 14:30	Thüringer HC (Germany)	22–27	(Montenegro) Budućnost	Wiedigsburghalle, Nordhausen; Attendance: 1,800; Referees: Mandak, Rudinsky (SVK)
2 November 2014; 14:30	Nadgornaja 5	(11–16)	Neagu 6	Wiedigsburghalle, Nordhausen; Attendance: 1,800; Referees: Mandak, Rudinsky (SVK)
2 November 2014; 14:30	2× (yellow card) 3× (suspension) 1× (red card)	Report	2× (yellow card) 5× (suspension)	Wiedigsburghalle, Nordhausen; Attendance: 1,800; Referees: Mandak, Rudinsky (SVK)

2 November 2014; 17:00	Podravka Koprivnica (Croatia)	26–27	(North Macedonia) Vardar	Gymnasium Fran Galović, Koprivnica; Attendance: 1,800; Referees: Rakytina, Tkachuk (UKR)
2 November 2014; 17:00	Tatari 7	(13–11)	Lekić 7	Gymnasium Fran Galović, Koprivnica; Attendance: 1,800; Referees: Rakytina, Tkachuk (UKR)
2 November 2014; 17:00	3× (yellow card) 3× (suspension)	Report	3× (yellow card) 4× (suspension)	Gymnasium Fran Galović, Koprivnica; Attendance: 1,800; Referees: Rakytina, Tkachuk (UKR)

9 November 2014; 19:00	Budućnost (Montenegro)	23–14	(Germany) Thüringer HC	Morača Sports Center, Podgorica; Attendance: 4,500; Referees: Arntsen, Røen (NOR)
9 November 2014; 19:00	Miljanić-Petrovic 6	(11–6)	Mietzner 7	Morača Sports Center, Podgorica; Attendance: 4,500; Referees: Arntsen, Røen (NOR)
9 November 2014; 19:00	2× (yellow card) 3× (suspension)	Report	2× (yellow card) 2× (suspension)	Morača Sports Center, Podgorica; Attendance: 4,500; Referees: Arntsen, Røen (NOR)

9 November 2014; 19:00	Vardar (North Macedonia)	35–25	(Croatia) Podravka Koprivnica	Jane Sandanski Arena, Skopje; Attendance: 4,500; Referees: Erdoğan, Özdeniz (TUR)
9 November 2014; 19:00	Radičević 5	(15–10)	Čović 5	Jane Sandanski Arena, Skopje; Attendance: 4,500; Referees: Erdoğan, Özdeniz (TUR)
9 November 2014; 19:00	3× (yellow card) 6× (suspension)	Report	3× (yellow card) 3× (suspension)	Jane Sandanski Arena, Skopje; Attendance: 4,500; Referees: Erdoğan, Özdeniz (TUR)

15 November 2014; 17:30	Podravka Koprivnica (Croatia)	28–32	(Germany) Thüringer HC	Gymnasium Fran Galović, Koprivnica; Attendance: 1,800; Referees: Andorka, Hucker (HUN)
15 November 2014; 17:30	Živković 9	(8–15)	Nadgornaja 8	Gymnasium Fran Galović, Koprivnica; Attendance: 1,800; Referees: Andorka, Hucker (HUN)
15 November 2014; 17:30	3× (yellow card) 2× (suspension)	Report	2× (yellow card) 2× (suspension)	Gymnasium Fran Galović, Koprivnica; Attendance: 1,800; Referees: Andorka, Hucker (HUN)

16 November 2014; 19:00	Vardar (North Macedonia)	24–24	(Montenegro) Budućnost	Jane Sandanski Arena, Skopje; Attendance: 5,000; Referees: Opava, Válek (CZE)
16 November 2014; 19:00	Penezić 8	(9–11)	Neagu 7	Jane Sandanski Arena, Skopje; Attendance: 5,000; Referees: Opava, Válek (CZE)
16 November 2014; 19:00	2× (yellow card) 2× (suspension)	Report	3× (yellow card) 5× (suspension)	Jane Sandanski Arena, Skopje; Attendance: 5,000; Referees: Opava, Válek (CZE)

22 November 2014; 14:30	Thüringer HC (Germany)	21–20	(North Macedonia) Vardar	Wiedigsburghalle, Nordhausen; Attendance: 1,800; Referees: Stenrand, Birch (DEN)
22 November 2014; 14:30	Nadgornaja 8	(10–12)	Penezić 6	Wiedigsburghalle, Nordhausen; Attendance: 1,800; Referees: Stenrand, Birch (DEN)
22 November 2014; 14:30	3× (yellow card) 3× (suspension)	Report	3× (yellow card) 6× (suspension)	Wiedigsburghalle, Nordhausen; Attendance: 1,800; Referees: Stenrand, Birch (DEN)

23 November 2014; 19:00	Budućnost (Montenegro)	32–26	(Croatia) Podravka Koprivnica	Morača Sports Center, Podgorica; Attendance: 3,000; Referees: Vitaku, Vitaku (Kosovo)
23 November 2014; 19:00	Neagu 10	(15–13)	Elez 6	Morača Sports Center, Podgorica; Attendance: 3,000; Referees: Vitaku, Vitaku (Kosovo)
23 November 2014; 19:00	3× (yellow card) 4× (suspension)	Report	3× (yellow card) 3× (suspension)	Morača Sports Center, Podgorica; Attendance: 3,000; Referees: Vitaku, Vitaku (Kosovo)

== Group C ==
Team	Pld	W	D	L	GF	GA	GD	Pts
(Hungary) Győri Audi ETO KC	6	6	0	0	183	127	+56	12
(Denmark) Viborg HK	6	3	1	2	162	144	+18	7
(Sweden) IK Sävehof	6	0	3	3	146	188	−42	3
(Croatia) Lokomotiva Zagreb	6	0	2	4	132	164	−32	2

19 October 2014; 15:10	Viborg HK (Denmark)	38–25	(Sweden) IK Sävehof	Viborg Stadionhal, Viborg; Attendance: 1,452; Referees: Arntsen, Røen (NOR)
19 October 2014; 15:10	Damnjanović 12	(16–15)	Alm, Odén 6	Viborg Stadionhal, Viborg; Attendance: 1,452; Referees: Arntsen, Røen (NOR)
19 October 2014; 15:10	3× (yellow card) 2× (suspension)	Report	1× (yellow card) 2× (suspension)	Viborg Stadionhal, Viborg; Attendance: 1,452; Referees: Arntsen, Røen (NOR)

19 October 2014; 19:00	Győri Audi ETO KC (Hungary)	32–23	(Croatia) Lokomotiva Zagreb	Egyetemi Csarnok, Győr; Attendance: 2,768; Referees: Gasmi, Gasmi (FRA)
19 October 2014; 19:00	Amorim 8	(17–13)	Bašić, Horvat 4	Egyetemi Csarnok, Győr; Attendance: 2,768; Referees: Gasmi, Gasmi (FRA)
19 October 2014; 19:00	3× (yellow card) 4× (suspension)	Report	3× (yellow card) 6× (suspension)	Egyetemi Csarnok, Győr; Attendance: 2,768; Referees: Gasmi, Gasmi (FRA)

26 October 2014; 16:50	Lokomotiva Zagreb (Croatia)	18–25	(Denmark) Viborg HK	Dom Sportova, Zagreb; Attendance: 1,010; Referees: Baranowski, Lemanowicz (POL)
26 October 2014; 16:50	Grubišić, Hrbková 6	(9–14)	Fisker 8	Dom Sportova, Zagreb; Attendance: 1,010; Referees: Baranowski, Lemanowicz (POL)
26 October 2014; 16:50	3× (yellow card) 4× (suspension)	Report	3× (yellow card) 2× (suspension)	Dom Sportova, Zagreb; Attendance: 1,010; Referees: Baranowski, Lemanowicz (POL)

26 October 2014; 17:00	IK Sävehof (Sweden)	21–38	(Hungary) Győri Audi ETO KC	Partillebohallen, Partille; Attendance: 1,315; Referees: Brunovský, Čanda (SVK)
26 October 2014; 17:00	Wikensten 5	(8–20)	Løke 7	Partillebohallen, Partille; Attendance: 1,315; Referees: Brunovský, Čanda (SVK)
26 October 2014; 17:00	2× (yellow card) 4× (suspension)	Report	3× (yellow card) 2× (suspension)	Partillebohallen, Partille; Attendance: 1,315; Referees: Brunovský, Čanda (SVK)

31 October 2014; 19:00	IK Sävehof (Sweden)	29–29	(Croatia) Lokomotiva Zagreb	Partillebohallen, Partille; Attendance: 810; Referees: Bounouara, Sami (FRA)
31 October 2014; 19:00	Odén 10	(15–15)	Irman 7	Partillebohallen, Partille; Attendance: 810; Referees: Bounouara, Sami (FRA)
31 October 2014; 19:00	3× (yellow card) 3× (suspension)	Report	3× (yellow card) 6× (suspension)	Partillebohallen, Partille; Attendance: 810; Referees: Bounouara, Sami (FRA)

2 November 2014; 17:00	Viborg HK (Denmark)	25–30	(Hungary) Győri Audi ETO KC	Viborg Stadionhal, Viborg; Attendance: 1,705; Referees: Pandzić, Mosorinski (SRB)
2 November 2014; 17:00	Lyksborg 5	(13–17)	Amorim 7	Viborg Stadionhal, Viborg; Attendance: 1,705; Referees: Pandzić, Mosorinski (SRB)
2 November 2014; 17:00	3× (yellow card) 1× (suspension)	Report	3× (yellow card)	Viborg Stadionhal, Viborg; Attendance: 1,705; Referees: Pandzić, Mosorinski (SRB)

8 November 2014; 16:00	Győri Audi ETO KC (Hungary)	22–20	(Denmark) Viborg HK	Egyetemi Csarnok, Győr; Attendance: 3,000; Referees: Florescu, Stoia (ROU)
8 November 2014; 16:00	Kovacsics 7	(9–11)	Damnjanović, Gulldén 4	Egyetemi Csarnok, Győr; Attendance: 3,000; Referees: Florescu, Stoia (ROU)
8 November 2014; 16:00	3× (yellow card) 1× (suspension)	Report	3× (yellow card) 3× (suspension) 1× (red card)	Egyetemi Csarnok, Győr; Attendance: 3,000; Referees: Florescu, Stoia (ROU)

9 November 2014; 17:00	Lokomotiva Zagreb (Croatia)	23–23	(Sweden) IK Sävehof	Dom Sportova, Zagreb; Attendance: 1,000; Referees: Kijauskaite, Zaliene (LTU)
9 November 2014; 17:00	Hrbková 6	(10–15)	Odén 8	Dom Sportova, Zagreb; Attendance: 1,000; Referees: Kijauskaite, Zaliene (LTU)
9 November 2014; 17:00	3× (yellow card) 3× (suspension)	Report	3× (yellow card) 3× (suspension)	Dom Sportova, Zagreb; Attendance: 1,000; Referees: Kijauskaite, Zaliene (LTU)

16 November 2014; 14:00	IK Sävehof (Sweden)	25–25	(Denmark) Viborg HK	Partillebohallen, Partille; Attendance: 1,380; Referees: Schulze, Tönnies (GER)
16 November 2014; 14:00	Odén 7	(10–12)	Fisker 7	Partillebohallen, Partille; Attendance: 1,380; Referees: Schulze, Tönnies (GER)
16 November 2014; 14:00	3× (yellow card) 4× (suspension)	Report	3× (yellow card) 5× (suspension)	Partillebohallen, Partille; Attendance: 1,380; Referees: Schulze, Tönnies (GER)

16 November 2014; 18:00	Lokomotiva Zagreb (Croatia)	15–26	(Hungary) Győri Audi ETO KC	Dom Sportova, Zagreb; Attendance: 1,500; Referees: Álvarez, Bustamante (ESP)
16 November 2014; 18:00	Hrbková 4	(7–13)	Løke 5	Dom Sportova, Zagreb; Attendance: 1,500; Referees: Álvarez, Bustamante (ESP)
16 November 2014; 18:00	3× (yellow card) 5× (suspension)	Report	3× (yellow card) 2× (suspension)	Dom Sportova, Zagreb; Attendance: 1,500; Referees: Álvarez, Bustamante (ESP)

23 November 2014; 13:40	Viborg HK (Denmark)	29–24	(Croatia) Lokomotiva Zagreb	Viborg Stadionhal, Viborg; Attendance: 1,200; Referees: Bonaventura, Bonaventura (FRA)
23 November 2014; 13:40	Gulldén, Skov 7	(11–12)	Bašić 8	Viborg Stadionhal, Viborg; Attendance: 1,200; Referees: Bonaventura, Bonaventura (FRA)
23 November 2014; 13:40	3× (yellow card) 1× (suspension)	Report	2× (yellow card) 6× (suspension)	Viborg Stadionhal, Viborg; Attendance: 1,200; Referees: Bonaventura, Bonaventura (FRA)

23 November 2014; 17:00	Győri Audi ETO KC (Hungary)	35–23	(Sweden) IK Sävehof	Audi Aréna, Győr; Attendance: 5,200; Referees: Zotin, Volodkov (RUS)
23 November 2014; 17:00	Amorim 7	(16–14)	Alm 7	Audi Aréna, Győr; Attendance: 5,200; Referees: Zotin, Volodkov (RUS)
23 November 2014; 17:00	3× (yellow card) 3× (suspension)	Report	3× (yellow card) 3× (suspension)	Audi Aréna, Győr; Attendance: 5,200; Referees: Zotin, Volodkov (RUS)

== Group D ==
Team	Pld	W	D	L	GF	GA	GD	Pts
(Norway) Larvik HK	6	6	0	0	169	141	+28	12
(France) Metz	6	2	1	3	164	163	+1	5
(Romania) HCM Baia Mare	6	2	0	4	154	160	−6	4
(Poland) SPR Lublin	6	1	1	4	159	182	−23	3

17 October 2014; 17:00	HCM Baia Mare (Romania)	30–25	(Poland) SPR Lublin	Sala Sporturilor "Lascăr Pană", Baia Mare; Attendance: 2,000; Referees: Jurinović, Mrvica (CRO)
17 October 2014; 17:00	Do Nascimento 6	(16–12)	Kocela 6	Sala Sporturilor "Lascăr Pană", Baia Mare; Attendance: 2,000; Referees: Jurinović, Mrvica (CRO)
17 October 2014; 17:00	2× (yellow card) 2× (suspension)	Report	3× (yellow card) 2× (suspension)	Sala Sporturilor "Lascăr Pană", Baia Mare; Attendance: 2,000; Referees: Jurinović, Mrvica (CRO)

18 October 2014; 18:30	Larvik HK (Norway)	25–20	(France) Metz	Arena Larvik, Larvik; Attendance: 3,210; Referees: Schulze, Tönnies (GER)
18 October 2014; 18:30	Mørk 11	(11–11)	Baudouin, Zaadi 5	Arena Larvik, Larvik; Attendance: 3,210; Referees: Schulze, Tönnies (GER)
18 October 2014; 18:30	2× (yellow card) 4× (suspension)	Report	3× (yellow card) 7× (suspension)	Arena Larvik, Larvik; Attendance: 3,210; Referees: Schulze, Tönnies (GER)

24 October 2014; 20:15	SPR Lublin (Poland)	23–28	(Norway) Larvik HK	Hala Sportowo-Widowiskowa „Globus”, Lublin; Attendance: 2,100; Referees: Erdoğan, Özdeniz (TUR)
24 October 2014; 20:15	Drabik 5	(14–13)	Riegelhuth Koren, Wojtas 6	Hala Sportowo-Widowiskowa „Globus”, Lublin; Attendance: 2,100; Referees: Erdoğan, Özdeniz (TUR)
24 October 2014; 20:15	3× (yellow card) 3× (suspension)	Report	3× (yellow card) 2× (suspension)	Hala Sportowo-Widowiskowa „Globus”, Lublin; Attendance: 2,100; Referees: Erdoğan, Özdeniz (TUR)

25 October 2014; 16:00	Metz (France)	34–24	(Romania) HCM Baia Mare	Arènes de Metz, Metz; Attendance: 4,198; Referees: Zotin, Volodkov (RUS)
25 October 2014; 16:00	Gros 7	(13–10)	Buceschi, Davydenko 5	Arènes de Metz, Metz; Attendance: 4,198; Referees: Zotin, Volodkov (RUS)
25 October 2014; 16:00	3× (yellow card) 1× (suspension)	Report	3× (yellow card) 4× (suspension)	Arènes de Metz, Metz; Attendance: 4,198; Referees: Zotin, Volodkov (RUS)

31 October 2014; 19:00	HCM Baia Mare (Romania)	23–24	(Norway) Larvik HK	Sala Sporturilor "Lascăr Pană", Baia Mare; Attendance: 2,000; Referees: Horváth, Márton (HUN)
31 October 2014; 19:00	Davydenko 7	(13–12)	Edin 6	Sala Sporturilor "Lascăr Pană", Baia Mare; Attendance: 2,000; Referees: Horváth, Márton (HUN)
31 October 2014; 19:00	2× (yellow card) 2× (suspension)	Report	3× (yellow card) 5× (suspension)	Sala Sporturilor "Lascăr Pană", Baia Mare; Attendance: 2,000; Referees: Horváth, Márton (HUN)

2 November 2014; 18:00	SPR Lublin (Poland)	35–31	(France) Metz	Hala Sportowo-Widowiskowa „Globus”, Lublin; Attendance: 2,000; Referees: Brkic, Jusufhodzic (AUT)
2 November 2014; 18:00	Quintino 10	(17–16)	Gros 7	Hala Sportowo-Widowiskowa „Globus”, Lublin; Attendance: 2,000; Referees: Brkic, Jusufhodzic (AUT)
2 November 2014; 18:00	3× (yellow card) 3× (suspension)	Report	3× (yellow card) 4× (suspension)	Hala Sportowo-Widowiskowa „Globus”, Lublin; Attendance: 2,000; Referees: Brkic, Jusufhodzic (AUT)

8 November 2014; 18:15	Larvik HK (Norway)	31–26	(Romania) HCM Baia Mare	Arena Larvik, Larvik; Attendance: 3,487; Referees: Marín, García (ESP)
8 November 2014; 18:15	Riegelhuth Koren 9	(16–11)	Marin 7	Arena Larvik, Larvik; Attendance: 3,487; Referees: Marín, García (ESP)
8 November 2014; 18:15	3× (yellow card) 3× (suspension)	Report	3× (yellow card) 4× (suspension)	Arena Larvik, Larvik; Attendance: 3,487; Referees: Marín, García (ESP)

9 November 2014; 16:00	Metz (France)	30–30	(Poland) SPR Lublin	Arènes de Metz, Metz; Attendance: 4,452; Referees: Praštalo, Todorović (BIH)
9 November 2014; 16:00	Baudouin, Gros 7	(14–13)	Kocela 6	Arènes de Metz, Metz; Attendance: 4,452; Referees: Praštalo, Todorović (BIH)
9 November 2014; 16:00	3× (yellow card) 2× (suspension)	Report	3× (yellow card) 5× (suspension)	Arènes de Metz, Metz; Attendance: 4,452; Referees: Praštalo, Todorović (BIH)

15 November 2014; 16:00	Metz (France)	25–26	(Norway) Larvik HK	Arènes de Metz, Metz; Attendance: 4,254; Referees: Pech, Vagvölgyi (HUN)
15 November 2014; 16:00	Baudouin 10	(13–13)	Mørk 7	Arènes de Metz, Metz; Attendance: 4,254; Referees: Pech, Vagvölgyi (HUN)
15 November 2014; 16:00	3× (yellow card) 4× (suspension) 1× (red card)	Report	3× (yellow card) 2× (suspension)	Arènes de Metz, Metz; Attendance: 4,254; Referees: Pech, Vagvölgyi (HUN)

16 November 2014; 14:00	SPR Lublin (Poland)	22–28	(Romania) HCM Baia Mare	Hala Sportowo-Widowiskowa „Globus”, Lublin; Attendance: 3,000; Referees: Krkačev, Kolevski (MKD)
16 November 2014; 14:00	Gega, Rola 4	(10–10)	four players 4	Hala Sportowo-Widowiskowa „Globus”, Lublin; Attendance: 3,000; Referees: Krkačev, Kolevski (MKD)
16 November 2014; 14:00	3× (yellow card) 4× (suspension)	Report	3× (yellow card) 6× (suspension)	Hala Sportowo-Widowiskowa „Globus”, Lublin; Attendance: 3,000; Referees: Krkačev, Kolevski (MKD)

21 November 2014; 19:00	HCM Baia Mare (Romania)	23–24	(France) Metz	Sala Sporturilor "Lascăr Pană", Baia Mare; Attendance: 2,100; Referees: Vešović, Mitrović (MNE)
21 November 2014; 19:00	Ardean-Elisei, Makeeva 5	(12–10)	Gros, Zaadi 6	Sala Sporturilor "Lascăr Pană", Baia Mare; Attendance: 2,100; Referees: Vešović, Mitrović (MNE)
21 November 2014; 19:00	3× (yellow card) 1× (suspension)	Report	3× (yellow card) 3× (suspension)	Sala Sporturilor "Lascăr Pană", Baia Mare; Attendance: 2,100; Referees: Vešović, Mitrović (MNE)

22 November 2014; 18:15	Larvik HK (Norway)	35–24	(Poland) SPR Lublin	Arena Larvik, Larvik; Attendance: 3,855; Referees: Alpaidze, Berezkina (RUS)
22 November 2014; 18:15	Mørk 9	(20–10)	Quintino 6	Arena Larvik, Larvik; Attendance: 3,855; Referees: Alpaidze, Berezkina (RUS)
22 November 2014; 18:15	3× (yellow card) 2× (suspension)	Report	2× (yellow card) 3× (suspension)	Arena Larvik, Larvik; Attendance: 3,855; Referees: Alpaidze, Berezkina (RUS)
