= 2014–15 Women's EHF Champions League main round =

This article describes the main round of the 2014–15 Women's EHF Champions League.

== Format ==
The top three teams of each group from the group stage advanced to the main round. The 12 teams were split into two groups of six teams. The top four placed teams advanced to the knockout stage. The points gained in the group stage against teams that advance, were carried over.

Key to colours in group tables
Top four placed teams advanced to the quarterfinals

== Group 1 ==
Team	Pld	W	D	L	GF	GA	GD	Pts
(Montenegro) Budućnost	10	9	1	0	270	193	+77	19
(Russia) Dinamo Volgograd	10	5	1	4	267	260	+7	11
(North Macedonia) Vardar	10	5	1	4	277	254	+23	11
(Germany) Thüringer HC	10	5	1	4	258	251	+7	11
(Germany) HC Leipzig	10	3	0	7	245	282	−37	6
(Slovenia) Krim	10	1	0	9	248	325	−77	2

30 January 2015; 19:30	HC Leipzig (Germany)	26–23	(North Macedonia) Vardar	Arena Leipzig, Leipzig; Attendance: 1,977; Referees: Gousko, Repkin (BLR)
30 January 2015; 19:30	Kudłacz 7	(13–10)	Lekić 6	Arena Leipzig, Leipzig; Attendance: 1,977; Referees: Gousko, Repkin (BLR)
30 January 2015; 19:30	3× (yellow card) 3× (suspension) 1× (red card)	Report	3× (yellow card) 4× (suspension)	Arena Leipzig, Leipzig; Attendance: 1,977; Referees: Gousko, Repkin (BLR)

31 January 2015; 16:00	Dinamo Volgograd (Russia)	18–25	(Montenegro) Budućnost	Sport Hall "Dinamo", Volgograd; Attendance: 1,400; Referees: Năstase, Stancu (ROU)
31 January 2015; 16:00	Akopian 6	(11–12)	Mehmedović, Neagu 6	Sport Hall "Dinamo", Volgograd; Attendance: 1,400; Referees: Năstase, Stancu (ROU)
31 January 2015; 16:00	3× (yellow card) 3× (suspension)	Report	3× (yellow card) 5× (suspension)	Sport Hall "Dinamo", Volgograd; Attendance: 1,400; Referees: Năstase, Stancu (ROU)

31 January 2015; 17:00	Krim (Slovenia)	23–26	(Germany) Thüringer HC	Arena Stožice, Ljubljana; Attendance: 1,000; Referees: Brkic, Jusufhodzic (AUT)
31 January 2015; 17:00	Koren 8	(15–13)	Nadgornaja 7	Arena Stožice, Ljubljana; Attendance: 1,000; Referees: Brkic, Jusufhodzic (AUT)
31 January 2015; 17:00	3× (yellow card) 3× (suspension)	Report	3× (yellow card) 4× (suspension)	Arena Stožice, Ljubljana; Attendance: 1,000; Referees: Brkic, Jusufhodzic (AUT)

7 February 2015; 19:00	Vardar (North Macedonia)	41–30	(Slovenia) Krim	Jane Sandanski Arena, Skopje; Attendance: 3,000; Referees: Antić, Jakovljević (SRB)
7 February 2015; 19:00	Radičević 8	(21–12)	Mavsar 8	Jane Sandanski Arena, Skopje; Attendance: 3,000; Referees: Antić, Jakovljević (SRB)
7 February 2015; 19:00	3× (yellow card) 4× (suspension)	Report	2× (yellow card) 1× (suspension)	Jane Sandanski Arena, Skopje; Attendance: 3,000; Referees: Antić, Jakovljević (SRB)

8 February 2015; 14:00	Thüringer HC (Germany)	30–33	(Russia) Dinamo Volgograd	Wiedigsburghalle, Nordhausen; Attendance: 1,950; Referees: Erdoğan, Özdeniz (TUR)
8 February 2015; 14:00	Frey 7	(13–14)	Akopian, Kochetova 8	Wiedigsburghalle, Nordhausen; Attendance: 1,950; Referees: Erdoğan, Özdeniz (TUR)
8 February 2015; 14:00	3× (yellow card) 2× (suspension)	Report	2× (yellow card) 6× (suspension) 1× (red card)	Wiedigsburghalle, Nordhausen; Attendance: 1,950; Referees: Erdoğan, Özdeniz (TUR)

8 February 2015; 19:00	Budućnost (Montenegro)	28–21	(Germany) HC Leipzig	Morača Sports Center, Podgorica; Attendance: 5,000; Referees: Tzaferopoulos, Bethmann (GRE)
8 February 2015; 19:00	Neagu 7	(16–7)	Kudłacz 7	Morača Sports Center, Podgorica; Attendance: 5,000; Referees: Tzaferopoulos, Bethmann (GRE)
8 February 2015; 19:00	3× (yellow card) 3× (suspension)	Report	3× (yellow card) 3× (suspension)	Morača Sports Center, Podgorica; Attendance: 5,000; Referees: Tzaferopoulos, Bethmann (GRE)

13 February 2015; 18:00	Krim (Slovenia)	20–23	(Montenegro) Budućnost	Arena Stožice, Ljubljana; Attendance: 800; Referees: Jurinović, Mrvica (CRO)
13 February 2015; 18:00	Mavsar 7	(8–16)	Neagu, Miljanić-Petrović 5	Arena Stožice, Ljubljana; Attendance: 800; Referees: Jurinović, Mrvica (CRO)
13 February 2015; 18:00	2× (yellow card) 1× (suspension)	Report	3× (yellow card) 5× (suspension)	Arena Stožice, Ljubljana; Attendance: 800; Referees: Jurinović, Mrvica (CRO)

14 February 2015; 14:00	HC Leipzig (Germany)	25–34	(Germany) Thüringer HC	Arena Leipzig, Leipzig; Attendance: 3,119; Referees: Hansen, Pettersen (NOR)
14 February 2015; 14:00	Hubinger, Kudłacz 7	(11–14)	Engel, Nadgornaja 7	Arena Leipzig, Leipzig; Attendance: 3,119; Referees: Hansen, Pettersen (NOR)
14 February 2015; 14:00	3× (yellow card) 4× (suspension)	Report	6× (suspension) 1× (red card)	Arena Leipzig, Leipzig; Attendance: 3,119; Referees: Hansen, Pettersen (NOR)

15 February 2015; 16:00	Dinamo Volgograd (Russia)	33–25	(North Macedonia) Vardar	Sport Hall "Dinamo", Volgograd; Attendance: 1,000; Referees: Mandak, Rudinsky (SVK)
15 February 2015; 16:00	Kochetova 9	(15–12)	Penezić, Radičević 7	Sport Hall "Dinamo", Volgograd; Attendance: 1,000; Referees: Mandak, Rudinsky (SVK)
15 February 2015; 16:00	3× (yellow card) 2× (suspension)	Report	3× (yellow card) 5× (suspension)	Sport Hall "Dinamo", Volgograd; Attendance: 1,000; Referees: Mandak, Rudinsky (SVK)

28 February 2015; 19:00	Vardar (North Macedonia)	26–20	(Germany) HC Leipzig	Jane Sandanski Arena, Skopje; Attendance: 4,000; Referees: Bonifert, Oláh (HUN)
28 February 2015; 19:00	Althaus 6	(10–9)	Kudłacz 6	Jane Sandanski Arena, Skopje; Attendance: 4,000; Referees: Bonifert, Oláh (HUN)
28 February 2015; 19:00	3× (yellow card) 5× (suspension)	Report	3× (yellow card) 4× (suspension)	Jane Sandanski Arena, Skopje; Attendance: 4,000; Referees: Bonifert, Oláh (HUN)

1 March 2015; 14:00	Thüringer HC (Germany)	33–21	(Slovenia) Krim	Wiedigsburghalle, Nordhausen; Attendance: 1,950; Referees: Bonaventura, Bonaventura (FRA)
1 March 2015; 14:00	four players 5	(17–10)	Artsiukhovich, Mavsar 4	Wiedigsburghalle, Nordhausen; Attendance: 1,950; Referees: Bonaventura, Bonaventura (FRA)
1 March 2015; 14:00	2× (yellow card) 2× (suspension)	Report	3× (yellow card) 2× (suspension)	Wiedigsburghalle, Nordhausen; Attendance: 1,950; Referees: Bonaventura, Bonaventura (FRA)

1 March 2015; 19:00	Budućnost (Montenegro)	26–18	(Russia) Dinamo Volgograd	Morača Sports Center, Podgorica; Attendance: 4,500; Referees: Horváth, Márton (HUN)
1 March 2015; 19:00	Neagu 7	(13–9)	Kochetova 4	Morača Sports Center, Podgorica; Attendance: 4,500; Referees: Horváth, Márton (HUN)
1 March 2015; 19:00	3× (yellow card) 7× (suspension) 1× (red card)	Report	3× (yellow card) 4× (suspension)	Morača Sports Center, Podgorica; Attendance: 4,500; Referees: Horváth, Márton (HUN)

6 March 2015; 19:00	Krim (Slovenia)	29–47	(North Macedonia) Vardar	Arena Stožice, Ljubljana; Attendance: 700; Referees: Arntsen, Røen (NOR)
6 March 2015; 19:00	Mavsar 11	(12–24)	Penezić 11	Arena Stožice, Ljubljana; Attendance: 700; Referees: Arntsen, Røen (NOR)
6 March 2015; 19:00	2× (yellow card) 3× (suspension)	Report	3× (yellow card) 2× (suspension)	Arena Stožice, Ljubljana; Attendance: 700; Referees: Arntsen, Røen (NOR)

7 March 2015; 14:00	HC Leipzig (Germany)	19–32	(Montenegro) Budućnost	Arena Leipzig, Leipzig; Attendance: 1,691; Referees: Poulsen, Mortensen (DEN)
7 March 2015; 14:00	Kudłacz 9	(6–15)	Neagu 9	Arena Leipzig, Leipzig; Attendance: 1,691; Referees: Poulsen, Mortensen (DEN)
7 March 2015; 14:00	3× (yellow card) 2× (suspension)	Report	3× (yellow card) 6× (suspension)	Arena Leipzig, Leipzig; Attendance: 1,691; Referees: Poulsen, Mortensen (DEN)

8 March 2015; 14:00	Dinamo Volgograd (Russia)	30–30	(Germany) Thüringer HC	Sport Hall "Dinamo", Volgograd; Attendance: 1,500; Referees: Opava, Válek (CZE)
8 March 2015; 14:00	Dmitrieva, Kochetova 9	(16–13)	Nadgornaja 9	Sport Hall "Dinamo", Volgograd; Attendance: 1,500; Referees: Opava, Válek (CZE)
8 March 2015; 14:00	3× (yellow card) 8× (suspension) 2× (red card)	Report	2× (yellow card) 6× (suspension)	Sport Hall "Dinamo", Volgograd; Attendance: 1,500; Referees: Opava, Válek (CZE)

14 March 2015; 19:00	Vardar (North Macedonia)	28–27	(Russia) Dinamo Volgograd	Jane Sandanski Arena, Skopje; Attendance: 3,000; Referees: Florescu, Stoia (ROU)
14 March 2015; 19:00	Penezić 7	(15–13)	Kochetova 10	Jane Sandanski Arena, Skopje; Attendance: 3,000; Referees: Florescu, Stoia (ROU)
14 March 2015; 19:00	3× (yellow card) 1× (suspension)	Report	3× (yellow card) 4× (suspension)	Jane Sandanski Arena, Skopje; Attendance: 3,000; Referees: Florescu, Stoia (ROU)

15 March 2015; 14:00	Thüringer HC (Germany)	27–23	(Germany) HC Leipzig	Wiedigsburghalle, Nordhausen; Attendance: 2,300; Referees: Praštalo, Todorović (BIH)
15 March 2015; 14:00	Engel 8	(11–11)	Hubinger 8	Wiedigsburghalle, Nordhausen; Attendance: 2,300; Referees: Praštalo, Todorović (BIH)
15 March 2015; 14:00	3× (yellow card) 2× (suspension)	Report	3× (yellow card) 6× (suspension) 1× (red card)	Wiedigsburghalle, Nordhausen; Attendance: 2,300; Referees: Praštalo, Todorović (BIH)

15 March 2015; 19:00	Budućnost (Montenegro)	39–20	(Slovenia) Krim	Morača Sports Center, Podgorica; Attendance: 3,500; Referees: Pech, Vagvölgyi (HUN)
15 March 2015; 19:00	Mehmedović, Neagu 7	(19–8)	Mavsar 7	Morača Sports Center, Podgorica; Attendance: 3,500; Referees: Pech, Vagvölgyi (HUN)
15 March 2015; 19:00	3× (yellow card) 5× (suspension)	Report	2× (yellow card) 5× (suspension)	Morača Sports Center, Podgorica; Attendance: 3,500; Referees: Pech, Vagvölgyi (HUN)

== Group 2 ==
Team	Pld	W	D	L	GF	GA	GD	Pts
(Norway) Larvik HK	10	10	0	0	263	216	+47	20
(Hungary) Győri Audi ETO KC	10	8	0	2	282	224	+58	16
(Romania) HCM Baia Mare	10	4	0	6	262	270	−8	8
(Denmark) Viborg HK	10	3	1	6	252	274	−22	7
(France) Metz	10	3	0	7	244	253	−9	6
(Sweden) IK Sävehof	10	1	1	8	227	293	−66	3

1 February 2015; 14:00	IK Sävehof (Sweden)	26–28	(Romania) HCM Baia Mare	Partillebohallen, Partille; Attendance: 689; Referees: Alpaidze, Berezkina (RUS)
1 February 2015; 14:00	Alm 9	(14–15)	Buceschi 8	Partillebohallen, Partille; Attendance: 689; Referees: Alpaidze, Berezkina (RUS)
1 February 2015; 14:00	2× (yellow card) 5× (suspension)	Report	2× (yellow card) 4× (suspension) 1× (red card)	Partillebohallen, Partille; Attendance: 689; Referees: Alpaidze, Berezkina (RUS)

1 February 2015; 19:00	Győri Audi ETO KC (Hungary)	25–26	(Norway) Larvik HK	Audi Aréna, Győr; Attendance: 4,500; Referees: Cohen, Peretz (ISR)
1 February 2015; 19:00	Kovacsics 10	(11–14)	Riegelhuth Koren, Mørk 7	Audi Aréna, Győr; Attendance: 4,500; Referees: Cohen, Peretz (ISR)
1 February 2015; 19:00	3× (yellow card) 2× (suspension)	Report	3× (yellow card) 6× (suspension)	Audi Aréna, Győr; Attendance: 4,500; Referees: Cohen, Peretz (ISR)

2 February 2015; 19:00	Viborg HK (Denmark)	27–26	(France) Metz	Viborg Stadionhal, Viborg; Attendance: 1,357; Referees: Schulze, Tönnies (GER)
2 February 2015; 19:00	Gulldén 7	(12–12)	Gros 7	Viborg Stadionhal, Viborg; Attendance: 1,357; Referees: Schulze, Tönnies (GER)
2 February 2015; 19:00	2× (yellow card) 4× (suspension)	Report	3× (yellow card) 2× (suspension)	Viborg Stadionhal, Viborg; Attendance: 1,357; Referees: Schulze, Tönnies (GER)

6 February 2015; 19:00	Metz (France)	22–25	(Sweden) IK Sävehof	Arènes de Metz, Metz; Attendance: 3,758; Referees: Vujačić, Kazanegra (MNE)
6 February 2015; 19:00	Gros 6	(12–15)	Karlsson, Odén 6	Arènes de Metz, Metz; Attendance: 3,758; Referees: Vujačić, Kazanegra (MNE)
6 February 2015; 19:00	3× (yellow card) 4× (suspension)	Report	3× (yellow card) 2× (suspension)	Arènes de Metz, Metz; Attendance: 3,758; Referees: Vujačić, Kazanegra (MNE)

7 February 2015; 18:30	Larvik HK (Norway)	31–18	(Denmark) Viborg HK	Arena Larvik, Larvik; Attendance: 3,053; Referees: Pandzić, Satordzija (BIH)
7 February 2015; 18:30	Riegelhuth Koren 5	(18–10)	Gulldén 6	Arena Larvik, Larvik; Attendance: 3,053; Referees: Pandzić, Satordzija (BIH)
7 February 2015; 18:30	3× (yellow card) 7× (suspension)	Report	3× (yellow card) 6× (suspension) 1× (red card)	Arena Larvik, Larvik; Attendance: 3,053; Referees: Pandzić, Satordzija (BIH)

8 February 2015; 18:30	HCM Baia Mare (Romania)	18–26	(Hungary) Győri Audi ETO KC	Sala Sporturilor "Lascăr Pană", Baia Mare; Attendance: 2,000; Referees: Marin, García (ESP)
8 February 2015; 18:30	Do Nascimento, Gjeorgjievska 4	(9–13)	Müller 8	Sala Sporturilor "Lascăr Pană", Baia Mare; Attendance: 2,000; Referees: Marin, García (ESP)
8 February 2015; 18:30	3× (yellow card) 2× (suspension)	Report	2× (yellow card) 4× (suspension)	Sala Sporturilor "Lascăr Pană", Baia Mare; Attendance: 2,000; Referees: Marin, García (ESP)

13 February 2015; 19:00	IK Sävehof (Sweden)	20–25	(Norway) Larvik HK	Partillebohallen, Partille; Attendance: 1,505; Referees: Nabokau, Kulik (BLR)
13 February 2015; 19:00	Odén 6	(11–13)	four players 5	Partillebohallen, Partille; Attendance: 1,505; Referees: Nabokau, Kulik (BLR)
13 February 2015; 19:00	3× (yellow card) 5× (suspension)	Report	1× (yellow card) 3× (suspension)	Partillebohallen, Partille; Attendance: 1,505; Referees: Nabokau, Kulik (BLR)

14 February 2015; 17:15	Győri Audi ETO KC (Hungary)	31–27	(France) Metz	Audi Aréna, Győr; Attendance: 4,000; Referees: Marić, Mašić (SRB)
14 February 2015; 17:15	Løke 7	(15–11)	Gros 11	Audi Aréna, Győr; Attendance: 4,000; Referees: Marić, Mašić (SRB)
14 February 2015; 17:15	3× (yellow card) 1× (suspension)	Report	3× (yellow card) 4× (suspension)	Audi Aréna, Győr; Attendance: 4,000; Referees: Marić, Mašić (SRB)

15 February 2015; 15:10	Viborg HK (Denmark)	30–31	(Romania) HCM Baia Mare	Viborg Stadionhal, Viborg; Attendance: 1,697; Referees: Kijauskaite, Zaliene (LTU)
15 February 2015; 15:10	Skov 11	(12–14)	Abbingh 6	Viborg Stadionhal, Viborg; Attendance: 1,697; Referees: Kijauskaite, Zaliene (LTU)
15 February 2015; 15:10	3× (yellow card) 2× (suspension)	Report	3× (yellow card) 5× (suspension)	Viborg Stadionhal, Viborg; Attendance: 1,697; Referees: Kijauskaite, Zaliene (LTU)

28 February 2015; 18:30	Larvik HK (Norway)	21–19	(Hungary) Győri Audi ETO KC	Arena Larvik, Larvik; Attendance: 3,973; Referees: Caçador, Nicolau (POR)
28 February 2015; 18:30	Riegelhuth Koren, Solberg 5	(12–9)	Korsós, Müller 5	Arena Larvik, Larvik; Attendance: 3,973; Referees: Caçador, Nicolau (POR)
28 February 2015; 18:30	3× (yellow card) 3× (suspension)	Report	3× (yellow card) 5× (suspension)	Arena Larvik, Larvik; Attendance: 3,973; Referees: Caçador, Nicolau (POR)

1 March 2015; 16:50	Metz (France)	23–24	(Denmark) Viborg HK	Arènes de Metz, Metz; Attendance: 5,098; Referees: Brunovský, Čanda (SVK)
1 March 2015; 16:50	Broch, Gros 6	(12–10)	Skov 9	Arènes de Metz, Metz; Attendance: 5,098; Referees: Brunovský, Čanda (SVK)
1 March 2015; 16:50	2× (yellow card) 1× (suspension)	Report	3× (yellow card) 1× (suspension)	Arènes de Metz, Metz; Attendance: 5,098; Referees: Brunovský, Čanda (SVK)

1 March 2015; 17:30	HCM Baia Mare (Romania)	34–24	(Sweden) IK Sävehof	Sala Sporturilor "Lascăr Pană", Baia Mare; Attendance: 2,080; Referees: Pandzić, Satordzija (BIH)
1 March 2015; 17:30	Buceschi 11	(18–12)	Odén 8	Sala Sporturilor "Lascăr Pană", Baia Mare; Attendance: 2,080; Referees: Pandzić, Satordzija (BIH)
1 March 2015; 17:30	2× (yellow card) 7× (suspension)	Report	3× (yellow card) 5× (suspension)	Sala Sporturilor "Lascăr Pană", Baia Mare; Attendance: 2,080; Referees: Pandzić, Satordzija (BIH)

8 March 2015; 14:00	IK Sävehof (Sweden)	21–23	(France) Metz	Partillebohallen, Partille; Attendance: 500; Referees: Lah, Sok (SLO)
8 March 2015; 14:00	Lindvall-Haggren 6	(11–16)	Gros 7	Partillebohallen, Partille; Attendance: 500; Referees: Lah, Sok (SLO)
8 March 2015; 14:00	3× (yellow card) 3× (suspension) 1× (red card)	Report	3× (yellow card) 4× (suspension)	Partillebohallen, Partille; Attendance: 500; Referees: Lah, Sok (SLO)

8 March 2015; 16:50	Viborg HK (Denmark)	23–29	(Norway) Larvik HK	Viborg Stadionhal, Viborg; Attendance: 1,673; Referees: Vranes, Wenninger (AUT)
8 March 2015; 16:50	Damnjanović 7	(14–12)	Riegelhuth Koren 9	Viborg Stadionhal, Viborg; Attendance: 1,673; Referees: Vranes, Wenninger (AUT)
8 March 2015; 16:50	2× (yellow card) 1× (suspension)	Report	2× (yellow card) 1× (suspension)	Viborg Stadionhal, Viborg; Attendance: 1,673; Referees: Vranes, Wenninger (AUT)

8 March 2015; 19:00	Győri Audi ETO KC (Hungary)	29–23	(Romania) HCM Baia Mare	Audi Aréna, Győr; Attendance: 5,000; Referees: Mandak, Rudinsky (SVK)
8 March 2015; 19:00	Müller 8	(12–10)	Ardean-Elisei, Do Nascimento 4	Audi Aréna, Győr; Attendance: 5,000; Referees: Mandak, Rudinsky (SVK)
8 March 2015; 19:00	2× (yellow card) 3× (suspension)	Report	3× (yellow card) 4× (suspension)	Audi Aréna, Győr; Attendance: 5,000; Referees: Mandak, Rudinsky (SVK)

14 March 2015; 18:30	Larvik HK (Norway)	25–17	(Sweden) IK Sävehof	Arena Larvik, Larvik; Attendance: 2,472; Referees: Baumgart, Wild (GER)
14 March 2015; 18:30	Mørk 10	(12–8)	Sand 5	Arena Larvik, Larvik; Attendance: 2,472; Referees: Baumgart, Wild (GER)
14 March 2015; 18:30	3× (yellow card) 3× (suspension)	Report	3× (yellow card) 3× (suspension)	Arena Larvik, Larvik; Attendance: 2,472; Referees: Baumgart, Wild (GER)

15 March 2015; 19:00	Metz (France)	20–27	(Hungary) Győri Audi ETO KC	Arènes de Metz, Metz; Attendance: 5,071; Referees: Jurinović, Mrvica (CRO)
15 March 2015; 19:00	four players 3	(8–12)	Kovacsics 6	Arènes de Metz, Metz; Attendance: 5,071; Referees: Jurinović, Mrvica (CRO)
15 March 2015; 19:00	2× (yellow card) 3× (suspension)	Report	3× (yellow card) 5× (suspension)	Arènes de Metz, Metz; Attendance: 5,071; Referees: Jurinović, Mrvica (CRO)

15 March 2015; 20:00	HCM Baia Mare (Romania)	32–22	(Denmark) Viborg HK	Sala Sporturilor "Lascăr Pană", Baia Mare; Attendance: 2,080; Referees: Krkačev, Kolevski (MKD)
15 March 2015; 20:00	Abbingh, Do Nascimento 5	(17–11)	Burgaard 8	Sala Sporturilor "Lascăr Pană", Baia Mare; Attendance: 2,080; Referees: Krkačev, Kolevski (MKD)
15 March 2015; 20:00	3× (yellow card) 3× (suspension)	Report		Sala Sporturilor "Lascăr Pană", Baia Mare; Attendance: 2,080; Referees: Krkačev, Kolevski (MKD)
