= 2014–15 Women's EHF Champions League knockout stage =

This article describes the knockout stage of the 2014–15 Women's EHF Champions League.

== Qualified teams ==
The top four placed teams from each of the two main round groups advanced to the knockout stage.

Group	First place	Second place	Third place	Fourth place
1	(Montenegro) Budućnost	(Russia) Dinamo Volgograd	(North Macedonia) Vardar	(Germany) Thüringer HC
2	(Norway) Larvik HK	(Hungary) Győri Audi ETO KC	(Romania) HCM Baia Mare	(Denmark) Viborg HK

== Quarterfinals ==
The matches were played on 4–5 April and 11–12 April 2015.

=== Matches ===
Team 1	Agg.	Team 2	1st leg	2nd leg
Viborg HK (Denmark)	41–57	(Montenegro) Budućnost	22–28	19–29
Thüringer HC (Germany)	44–65	(Norway) Larvik HK	26–29	18–36
HCM Baia Mare (Romania)	50–53	(Russia) Dinamo Volgograd	25–23	25–30
Vardar (North Macedonia)	51–45	(Hungary) Győri Audi ETO KC	24–18	27–27

==== First leg ====
4 April 2015; 14:00	Thüringer HC (Germany)	26–29	(Norway) Larvik HK	Wiedigsburghalle, Nordhausen; Attendance: 2,000; Referees: Olesen, Pedersen (DEN)
4 April 2015; 14:00	Mietzner, Schmelzer 5	(11–14)	Mørk 12	Wiedigsburghalle, Nordhausen; Attendance: 2,000; Referees: Olesen, Pedersen (DEN)
4 April 2015; 14:00	3× (yellow card) 5× (suspension)	Report	3× (yellow card) 4× (suspension)	Wiedigsburghalle, Nordhausen; Attendance: 2,000; Referees: Olesen, Pedersen (DEN)

4 April 2015; 18:00	HCM Baia Mare (Romania)	25–23	(Russia) Dinamo Volgograd	Sala Sporturilor "Lascăr Pană", Baia Mare; Attendance: 2,080; Referees: Marić, Mašić (SRB)
4 April 2015; 18:00	Lobach 5	(11–12)	Kochetova 7	Sala Sporturilor "Lascăr Pană", Baia Mare; Attendance: 2,080; Referees: Marić, Mašić (SRB)
4 April 2015; 18:00	2× (yellow card) 2× (suspension)	Report	3× (yellow card) 5× (suspension)	Sala Sporturilor "Lascăr Pană", Baia Mare; Attendance: 2,080; Referees: Marić, Mašić (SRB)

4 April 2015; 19:00	Vardar (North Macedonia)	24–18	(Hungary) Győri Audi ETO KC	Jane Sandanski Arena, Skopje; Attendance: 4,800; Referees: Pichon, Reveret (FRA)
4 April 2015; 19:00	Radičević 7	(14–10)	Sen 5	Jane Sandanski Arena, Skopje; Attendance: 4,800; Referees: Pichon, Reveret (FRA)
4 April 2015; 19:00	3× (yellow card) 6× (suspension)	Report	3× (yellow card) 2× (suspension)	Jane Sandanski Arena, Skopje; Attendance: 4,800; Referees: Pichon, Reveret (FRA)

5 April 2015; 16:50	Viborg HK (Denmark)	22–28	(Montenegro) Budućnost	Viborg Stadionhal, Viborg; Attendance: 1,312; Referees: Alpaidze, Berezkina (RUS)
5 April 2015; 16:50	Skov 8	(11–13)	Bulatović 8	Viborg Stadionhal, Viborg; Attendance: 1,312; Referees: Alpaidze, Berezkina (RUS)
5 April 2015; 16:50	3× (yellow card) 4× (suspension)	Report	3× (yellow card) 9× (suspension) 2× (red card)	Viborg Stadionhal, Viborg; Attendance: 1,312; Referees: Alpaidze, Berezkina (RUS)

==== Second leg ====
11 April 2015; 14:00	Dinamo Volgograd (Russia)	30–25	(Romania) HCM Baia Mare	Sport Hall "Dinamo", Volgograd; Attendance: 1,000; Referees: Bonaventura, Bonaventura (FRA)
11 April 2015; 14:00	Levina 9	(18–11)	Davydenko, Do Nascimento 5	Sport Hall "Dinamo", Volgograd; Attendance: 1,000; Referees: Bonaventura, Bonaventura (FRA)
11 April 2015; 14:00	2× (yellow card) 3× (suspension)	Report	3× (yellow card) 3× (suspension)	Sport Hall "Dinamo", Volgograd; Attendance: 1,000; Referees: Bonaventura, Bonaventura (FRA)

Dinamo Volgograd won 53–50 on aggregate.

11 April 2015; 16:30	Győri Audi ETO KC (Hungary)	27–27	(North Macedonia) Vardar	Audi Aréna, Győr; Attendance: 5,000; Referees: Baranowski, Lemanowicz (POL)
11 April 2015; 16:30	Korsós, Sen 6	(13–12)	Penezić 8	Audi Aréna, Győr; Attendance: 5,000; Referees: Baranowski, Lemanowicz (POL)
11 April 2015; 16:30	3× (yellow card) 7× (suspension)	Report	2× (yellow card) 5× (suspension)	Audi Aréna, Győr; Attendance: 5,000; Referees: Baranowski, Lemanowicz (POL)

Vardar won 51–45 on aggregate.

11 April 2015; 18:30	Larvik HK (Norway)	36–18	(Germany) Thüringer HC	Arena Larvik, Larvik; Attendance: 2,682; Referees: Baďura, Ondogrecula (SVK)
11 April 2015; 18:30	Mørk 8	(17–9)	Mietzner 6	Arena Larvik, Larvik; Attendance: 2,682; Referees: Baďura, Ondogrecula (SVK)
11 April 2015; 18:30	3× (yellow card) 4× (suspension)	Report	3× (yellow card) 3× (suspension)	Arena Larvik, Larvik; Attendance: 2,682; Referees: Baďura, Ondogrecula (SVK)

Larvik HK won 65–44 on aggregate.

12 April 2015; 17:00	Budućnost (Montenegro)	29–19	(Denmark) Viborg HK	Morača Sports Center, Podgorica; Attendance: 4,000; Referees: Cohen, Peretz (ISR)
12 April 2015; 17:00	Mehmedović 8	(14–11)	Damnjanović 6	Morača Sports Center, Podgorica; Attendance: 4,000; Referees: Cohen, Peretz (ISR)
12 April 2015; 17:00	3× (yellow card) 3× (suspension)	Report	3× (yellow card) 1× (suspension)	Morača Sports Center, Podgorica; Attendance: 4,000; Referees: Cohen, Peretz (ISR)

Budućnost won 57–41 on aggregate.

== Final four ==
The draw was held on 14 April 2015.

=== Bracket ===
Semifinals
9 May
(Norway) Larvik HK	31
(Russia) Dinamo Volgograd	22
9 May
(North Macedonia) Vardar	17
(Montenegro) Budućnost	27

Final
10 May
(Norway) Larvik HK	22
(Montenegro) Budućnost	26
Third place game
10 May
(Russia) Dinamo Volgograd	26
(North Macedonia) Vardar	28

=== Semifinals ===
9 May 2015; 14:15	Larvik HK (Norway)	31–22	(Russia) Dinamo Volgograd	László Papp Sports Arena, Budapest; Attendance: 6,500; Referees: Poulsen, Mortensen (DEN)
9 May 2015; 14:15	Riegelhuth Koren 9	(16–13)	Dmitrieva 7	László Papp Sports Arena, Budapest; Attendance: 6,500; Referees: Poulsen, Mortensen (DEN)
9 May 2015; 14:15	3× (yellow card) 3× (suspension)	Report	3× (yellow card) 5× (suspension)	László Papp Sports Arena, Budapest; Attendance: 6,500; Referees: Poulsen, Mortensen (DEN)

9 May 2015; 16:45	Vardar (North Macedonia)	17–27	(Montenegro) Budućnost	László Papp Sports Arena, Budapest; Attendance: 6,500; Referees: Jurinović, Mrvica (CRO)
9 May 2015; 16:45	Lekić, Penezić 4	(9–14)	Neagu, Miljanić-Petrović 7	László Papp Sports Arena, Budapest; Attendance: 6,500; Referees: Jurinović, Mrvica (CRO)
9 May 2015; 16:45	3× (yellow card) 2× (suspension)	Report	3× (yellow card) 2× (suspension)	László Papp Sports Arena, Budapest; Attendance: 6,500; Referees: Jurinović, Mrvica (CRO)

=== Third place game ===
10 May 2015; 14:30	Dinamo Volgograd (Russia)	26–28	(North Macedonia) Vardar	László Papp Sports Arena, Budapest; Attendance: 6,500; Referees: Brunovský, Čanda (SVK)
10 May 2015; 14:30	Kochetova 7	(15–16)	Penezić 9	László Papp Sports Arena, Budapest; Attendance: 6,500; Referees: Brunovský, Čanda (SVK)
10 May 2015; 14:30	3× (yellow card) 3× (suspension) 1× (red card)	Report	1× (yellow card) 5× (suspension)	László Papp Sports Arena, Budapest; Attendance: 6,500; Referees: Brunovský, Čanda (SVK)

=== Final ===
10 May 2015; 17:00	Larvik HK (Norway)	22–26	(Montenegro) Budućnost	László Papp Sports Arena, Budapest; Attendance: 6,500; Referees: Horváth, Márton (HUN)
10 May 2015; 17:00	Mørk 10	(8–14)	Bulatović 7	László Papp Sports Arena, Budapest; Attendance: 6,500; Referees: Horváth, Márton (HUN)
10 May 2015; 17:00	3× (yellow card) 2× (suspension)	Report	3× (yellow card) 4× (suspension)	László Papp Sports Arena, Budapest; Attendance: 6,500; Referees: Horváth, Márton (HUN)
