= 2014–15 Women's EHF Champions League =

Women's EHF Champions League
- 2014–15
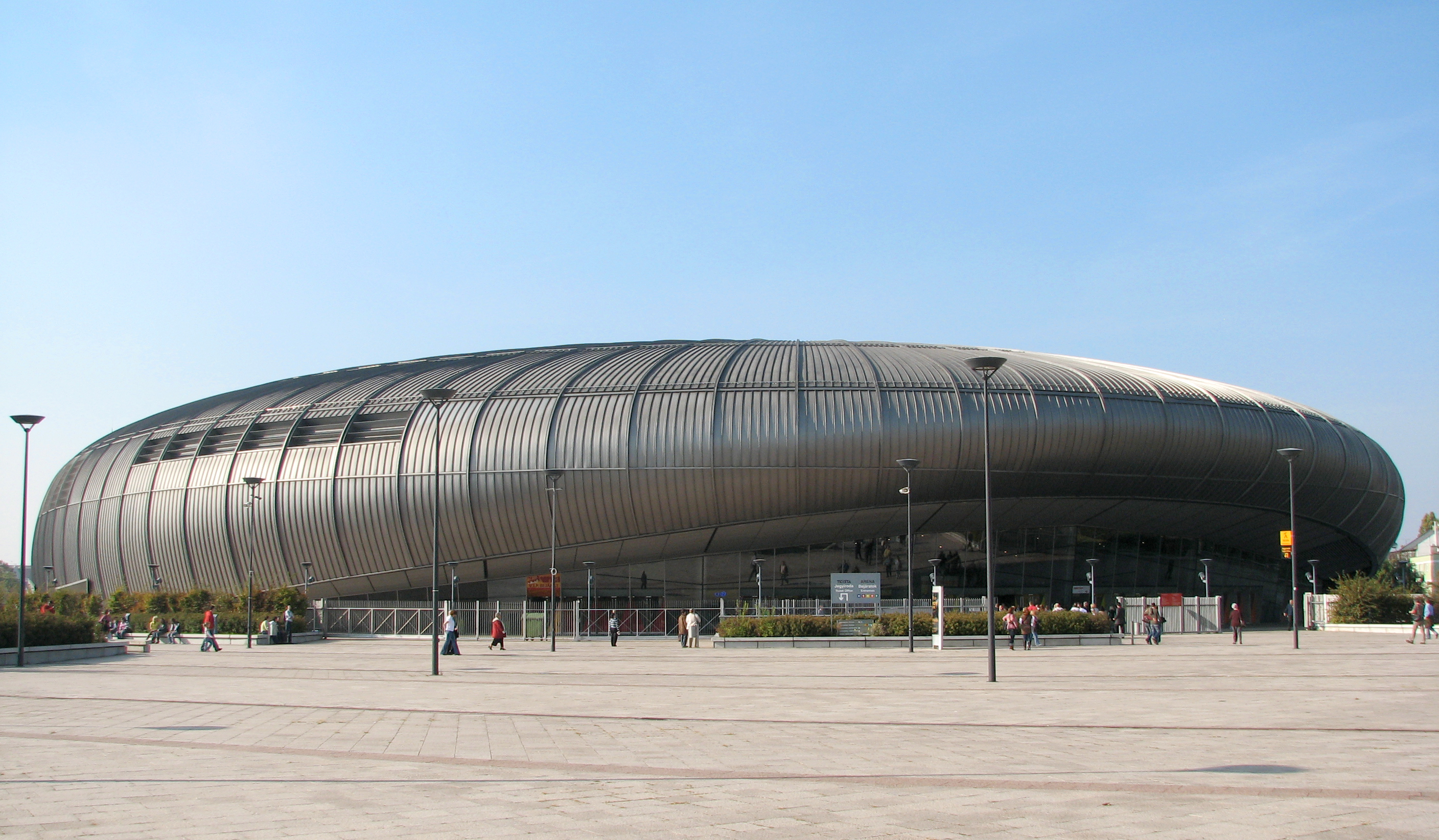
- The László Papp Sports Arena hosted the final four

Tournament information
- Sport: Handball
- Dates: 2014–2015
- Teams: 22 (qualification stage); 16 (group stage); 12 (Main round); 8 (knockout stage)

Final positions
- Champions: (Montenegro) Budućnost
- Runner-up: (Norway) Larvik HK

Tournament statistics
- Matches played: 96
- Goals scored: 4991 (51.99 per match)
- Attendance: 252,163 (2,627 per match)
- Top scorer(s): (Romania) Cristina Neagu (Croatia) Andrea Penezić (102 goals)

The 2014–15 Women's EHF Champions League was the 22nd edition of the Women's EHF Champions League, the competition for top women's clubs of Europe, organized and supervised by the European Handball Federation.

Budućnost won the title for the second time by defeating Larvik HK 26–22 in the big final.

== Overview ==
=== Team allocation ===
League positions of the previous season shown in parentheses (TH: Title holders). 14 teams were directly qualified for the group stage.

Group stage
(Hungary) Győri Audi ETO KC^{TH} (1st)	(Romania) HCM Baia Mare (1st)	(Slovenia) Krim (1st)	(North Macedonia) Vardar (1st)
(Denmark) Viborg HK (1st)	(Germany) Thüringer HC (1st)	(Austria) Hypo Niederösterreich (1st)	(Poland) SPR Lublin (1st)
(Norway) Larvik HK (1st)	(France) Metz (1st)	(Croatia) Lokomotiva Zagreb (1st)	
(Russia) Dinamo Volgograd (1st)	(Montenegro) Budućnost (1st)	(Sweden) IK Sävehof (1st)	
Qualification tournament
(Hungary) Ferencváros (2nd)	(Norway) Byåsen HE (2nd)	(Serbia) Radnički Kragujevac (1st)	(Netherlands) SERCODAK Dalfsen (1st)
(Denmark) Midtjylland (2nd)	(Germany) HC Leipzig (2nd)	(Croatia) Podravka Koprivnica (2nd)	(Belarus) BNTU Minsk (1st)

=== Round and draw dates ===
All draws held at the European Handball Federation headquarters in Vienna, Austria.

Phase	Round	Draw date	First leg	Second leg
Qualifying	Qualification tournaments	26 June 2014	20–21 September 2014	
Group stage	Matchday 1	27 June 2014	17–19 October 2014	
Group stage	Matchday 2	27 June 2014	24–26 October 2014	
Group stage	Matchday 3	27 June 2014	31 October–2 November 2014	
Group stage	Matchday 4	27 June 2014	7–9 November 2014	
Group stage	Matchday 5	27 June 2014	14–16 November 2014	
Group stage	Matchday 6	27 June 2014	21–23 November 2014	
Main round	Matchday 1	27 June 2014	31 January–2 February 2015	
Main round	Matchday 2	27 June 2014	6–8 February 2015	
Main round	Matchday 3	27 June 2014	13–15 February 2015	
Main round	Matchday 4	27 June 2014	27 February–1 March 2015	
Main round	Matchday 5	27 June 2014	6–8 March 2015	
Main round	Matchday 6	27 June 2014	13–15 March 2015	
Knockout stage	Quarterfinal	27 June 2014	3–5 April 2015	10–12 April 2015
Final 4 (Budapest)	Semifinal	14 April 2015	9 May 2015 at László Papp Sports Arena	
Final 4 (Budapest)	Final	14 April 2015	10 May 2015 at László Papp Sports Arena	

== Qualification stage ==
Eight teams took part in the qualification tournaments. They were drawn into two groups of four teams, where they played a semifinal and a final or third place match. The winners of the qualification tournaments, played on 20–21 September 2014, qualified for the group stage. The draw took place on 26 June 2014, at 14:00 local time, in Vienna, Austria.

=== Seedings ===
The seedings were published on 23 June 2014.

Pot 1	Pot 2	Pot 3	Pot 4
(Hungary) Ferencváros (Denmark) Midtjylland	(Norway) Byåsen HE (Germany) HC Leipzig	(Croatia) Podravka Koprivnica (Belarus) BNTU Minsk	(Netherlands) SERCODAK Dalfsen (Serbia) Radnički Kragujevac

=== Qualification tournament 1 ===
Semifinals
20 September
(Hungary) Ferencváros	33
(Netherlands) SERCODAK Dalfsen	25
20 September
(Germany) HC Leipzig	22
(Belarus) BNTU Minsk	18

Final
21 September
(Hungary) Ferencváros	38
(Germany) HC Leipzig (pen.)	39
Third place game
21 September
(Netherlands) SERCODAK Dalfsen	30
(Belarus) BNTU Minsk	27

=== Qualification tournament 2 ===
Semifinals
20 September
(Denmark) Midtjylland	24
(Serbia) Rad. Kragujevac (aet)	29
20 September
(Norway) Byåsen HE	23
(Croatia) Pod. Koprivnica	31

Final
21 September
(Serbia) Rad. Kragujevac	24
(Croatia) Pod.Koprivnica	28
Third place game
21 September
(Denmark) Midtjylland	28
(Norway) Byåsen HE	24

== Group stage ==
Location of teams of the 2014–15 Women's EHF Champions League group stage.
Red: Group A; Green: Group B; Blue: Group C; Yellow: Group D.

The 16 teams were drawn into four groups of four teams, where they played each other twice. The top three teams advanced to the main round. The draw took place on 27 June 2014, at 18:00 local time, in Vienna, Austria.

=== Seedings ===
The seedings were published on 23 June 2014.

Pot 1	Pot 2
(Hungary) Győri Audi ETO KC (Montenegro) Budućnost (Norway) Larvik HK (Slovenia) Krim	(Denmark) Viborg HK (Romania) HCM Baia Mare (Germany) Thüringer HC (Russia) Dinamo Volgograd

Pot 3	Pot 4
(North Macedonia) ŽRK Vardar (France) Metz Handball (Austria) Hypo Niederösterreich (Croatia) RK Lokomotiva Zagreb	(Sweden) IK Sävehof (Poland) SPR Lublin SSA (Germany) HC Leipzig (Croatia) RK Koprivnica

Key to colours in group tables
Top three placed teams advanced to the main round
Fourth-placed teams entered the Cup Winners' Cup last 16

=== Group A ===
Team	Pld	W	D	L	GF	GA	GD	Pts	DIN	LEI	KRI	HYP
(Russia) Dinamo Volgograd	6	4	1	1	160	143	+17	9	—	27–19	25–26	27–22
(Germany) HC Leipzig	6	4	0	2	177	152	+25	8	27–30	—	30–24	42–22
(Slovenia) Krim	6	2	0	4	162	165	−3	4	24–26	31–35	—	32–20
(Austria) Hypo Niederösterreich	6	1	1	4	136	175	−39	3	25–25	18–24	29–25	—

=== Group B ===
Team	Pld	W	D	L	GF	GA	GD	Pts	BUD	VAR	THÜ	POD
(Montenegro) Budućnost	6	5	1	0	161	130	+31	11	—	23–17	23–14	32–26
(North Macedonia) Vardar	6	3	1	2	149	140	+9	7	24–24	—	26–21	35–25
(Germany) Thüringer HC	6	3	0	3	143	144	−1	6	22–27	21–20	—	33–20
(Croatia) Podravka Koprivnica	6	0	0	6	152	191	−39	0	27–32	26–27	28–32	—

=== Group C ===
Team	Pld	W	D	L	GF	GA	GD	Pts	GYŐ	VIB	SÄV	LOK
(Hungary) Győri Audi ETO KC	6	6	0	0	183	127	+56	12	—	22–20	35–23	32–23
(Denmark) Viborg HK	6	3	1	2	162	144	+18	7	25–30	—	38–25	29–24
(Sweden) IK Sävehof	6	0	3	3	146	188	−42	3	21–38	25–25	—	29–29
(Croatia) Lokomotiva Zagreb	6	0	2	4	132	164	−32	2	15–26	18–25	23–23	—

=== Group D ===
Team	Pld	W	D	L	GF	GA	GD	Pts	LAR	MET	BAI	LUB
(Norway) Larvik HK	6	6	0	0	169	141	+28	12	—	25–20	31–26	35–24
(France) Metz	6	2	1	3	164	163	+1	5	25–26	—	34–24	30–30
(Romania) HCM Baia Mare	6	2	0	4	154	160	−6	4	23–24	23–24	—	30–25
(Poland) SPR Lublin	6	1	1	4	159	182	−23	3	23–28	35–31	22–28	—

== Main round ==
The top three teams of each group from the group stage advanced to the main round. The 12 teams were split into two groups of six teams. The top four placed teams advanced to the knockout stage. The points gained in the group stage against teams that advance, were carried over.

Key to colours in group tables
Top four placed teams advanced to quarterfinals

=== Group 1 ===
Team	Pld	W	D	L	GF	GA	GD	Pts	BUD	DIN	VAR	THÜ	LEI	KRI
(Montenegro) Budućnost	10	9	1	0	270	193	+77	19	—	26–18	23–17	23–14	28–21	39–20
(Russia) Dinamo Volgograd	10	5	1	4	267	260	+7	11	18–25	—	33–25	30–30	27–19	25–26
(North Macedonia) Vardar	10	5	1	4	277	254	+23	11	24–24	28–27	—	26–21	26–20	41–30
(Germany) Thüringer HC	10	5	1	4	258	251	+7	11	22–27	30–33	21–20	—	27–23	33–21
(Germany) HC Leipzig	10	3	0	7	245	282	−37	6	19–32	27–30	26–23	25–34	—	30–24
(Slovenia) Krim	10	1	0	9	248	325	−77	2	20–23	24–26	29–47	23–26	31–35	—

=== Group 2 ===
Team	Pld	W	D	L	GF	GA	GD	Pts	LAR	GYŐ	BAI	VIB	MET	SÄV
(Norway) Larvik HK	10	10	0	0	263	216	+47	20	—	21–19	31–26	31–18	25–20	25–17
(Hungary) Győri Audi ETO KC	10	8	0	2	282	224	+58	16	25–26	—	29–23	22–20	31–27	35–23
(Romania) HCM Baia Mare	10	4	0	6	262	270	−8	8	23–24	18–26	—	32–22	23–24	34–24
(Denmark) Viborg HK	10	3	1	6	252	274	−22	7	23–29	25–30	30–31	—	27–26	38–25
(France) Metz	10	3	0	7	244	253	−9	6	25–26	20–27	34–24	23–24	—	22–25
(Sweden) IK Sävehof	10	1	1	8	227	293	−66	3	20–25	21–38	26–28	25–25	21–23	—

== Knockout stage ==
The top four placed teams of each group advance to the knockout stage. In the quarterfinals, the teams will play a home-and away series to determine the four participants of the final four, which then determines the winner.

=== Quarterfinals ===
The matches were played on 4–5 April and 11–12 April 2015.

Team 1	Agg.	Team 2	1st leg	2nd leg
Viborg HK (Denmark)	41–57	(Montenegro) Budućnost	22–28	19–29
Thüringer HC (Germany)	44–65	(Norway) Larvik HK	26–29	18–36
HCM Baia Mare (Romania)	50–53	(Russia) Dinamo Volgograd	25–23	25–30
Vardar (North Macedonia)	51–45	(Hungary) Győri Audi ETO KC	24–18	27–27

=== Final four ===
The draw was held on 14 April 2015.

The final four was played in the László Papp Sports Arena, Budapest, Hungary.

Semifinals
9 May
(Norway) Larvik HK	31
(Russia) Dinamo Volgograd	22
9 May
(North Macedonia) Vardar	17
(Montenegro) Budućnost	27

Final
10 May
(Norway) Larvik HK	22
(Montenegro) Budućnost	26
Third place game
10 May
(Russia) Dinamo Volgograd	26
(North Macedonia) Vardar	28

== Statistics and awards ==
=== Top goalscorers ===
Statistics exclude qualifying rounds and play-off round.

As of 10 May 2015

Rank	Player	Team	Goals
1	(Romania) Cristina Neagu	(Montenegro) Budućnost	102
1	(Croatia) Andrea Penezić	(North Macedonia) Vardar	102
3	(Norway) Nora Mørk	(Norway) Larvik	98
4	(Russia) Anna Kochetova	(Russia) Volgograd	94
5	(Poland) Karolina Kudłacz	(Germany) Leipzig	84
6	(Russia) Olga Akopyan	(Russia) Volgograd	82
7	(Norway) Linn-Kristin Riegelhuth Koren	(Norway) Larvik	77
8	(Russia) Daria Dmitrieva	(Russia) Volgograd	76
9	(Sweden) Ida Oden	(Sweden) Sävehof	74
10	(Slovenia) Ana Gros	(France) Metz	73
10	(Slovenia) Tamara Mavsar	(Slovenia) Krim	73

=== All-Star Team ===
The all-star team and awards were announced on 8 May 2015.

- Goalkeeper: Sandra Toft (DEN)
- Right wing: Linn-Kristin Riegelhuth Koren (NOR)
- Right back: Nora Mørk (NOR)
- Central back: Anikó Kovacsics (HUN)
- Left back: Cristina Neagu (ROU)
- Left wing: Siraba Dembélé (FRA)
- Pivot: Heidi Løke (NOR)

=== Other awards ===
- Most Valuable Player of the Final Four: Clara Woltering (GER)
- Best Coach: Ambros Martín (ESP)
- Best Young Player: Eliza Buceschi (ROU)
- Best Defence Player: Dorina Korsós (HUN)

== See also ==
- 2014–15 Women's EHF Cup Winners' Cup
- 2014–15 Women's EHF Cup
- 2014–15 Women's EHF Challenge Cup
