= Gorica Aćimović =

Austrian handball player (born 1985)

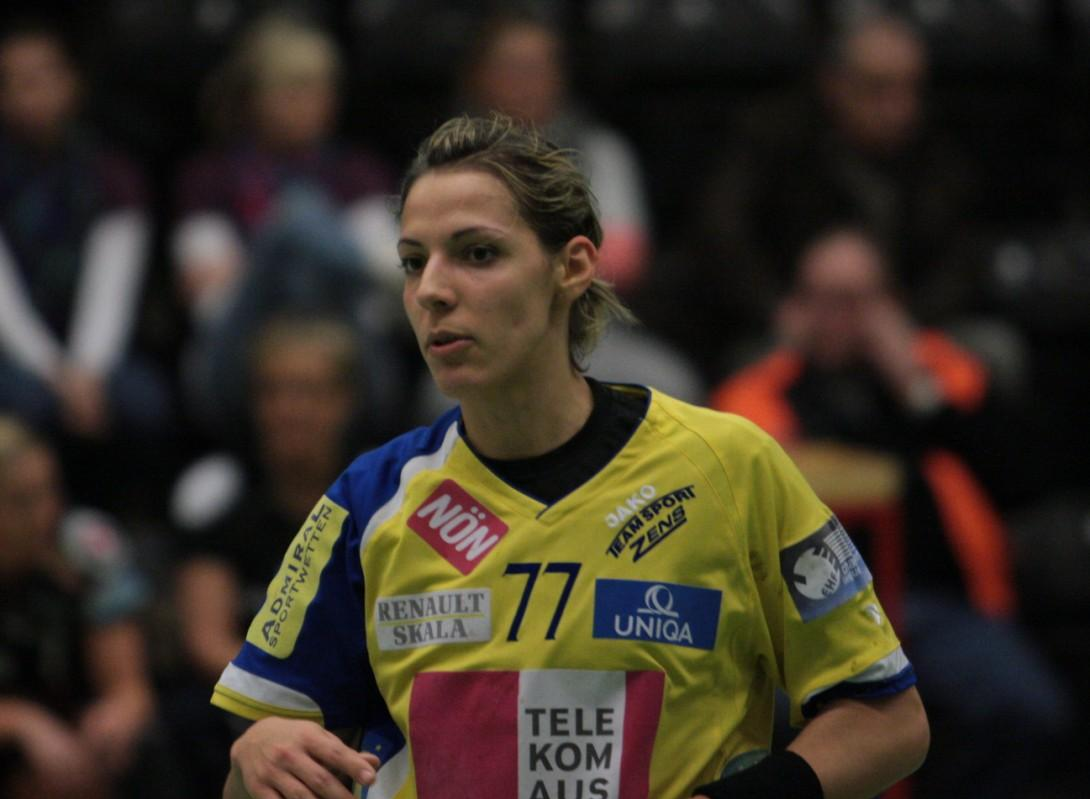

Personal information
- Full name: Gorica Aćimović
- Nationality: Austrian
- Born: 28 February 1985 (age 41) Banja Luka, SFR Yugoslavia
- Height: 1.85 m (6 ft 1 in)

Sport
- Sport: Handball
- Position: Left Back
- Current club: Hypo Niederösterreich

Senior clubs
- Years: Team
- 2003–2004: Merignac HB
- 2004–2009: Hypo Niederösterreich
- 2009–2011: Viborg HK
- 2011–2012: RK Krim
- 2012–2014: Hypo Niederösterreich
- 2016–2018: Hypo Niederösterreich
National team
Years	Team	Apps	(Gls)
2007–	Austria	25	(136)

Gorica Aćimović (Serbian Cyrillic: Горица Аћимовић; born 28 February 1985 in Banja Luka) is a retired Bosnian-Austrian handballer. Born in Bosnia and Herzegovina, she was granted Austrian citizenship in November 2007.

She received the Sports Ambassadorialship of the Republika Srpska plaque in 2010.

== Personal life ==
She was previously married to Lithuanian-born Austrian handball player Vytautas Žiūra. During their marriage, the couple often played in the same club systems, including a joint transfer to the Danish side Viborg HK in 2009.

Following their divorce, she married Croatian-Austrian international handball goalkeeper Kristian Pilipović. The couple resides in Austria and has two children together. Apart from their sporting careers, Aćimović and Pilipović are also business partners, having co-founded a real estate investment and property management company.

== Achievements ==
- Women Handball Austria:
  - Winner: 2005, 2006, 2007, 2008, 2009
- ÖHB Cup:
  - Winner: 2005, 2006, 2007, 2008, 2009
- Damehåndboldligaen:
  - Winner: 2010
- Landspokalturnering:
  - Winner: 2010, 2011
- EHF Champions League:
  - Winner: 2010
  - Finalist: 2008
