= Miranda Tatari =

Croatian handball player (born 1983)

Personal information
- Nationality: Croatian
- Born: 20 September 1983 (age 43) Koprivnica, SR Croatia, SFR Yugoslavia
- Height: 1.74 m (5 ft 9 in)

Sport
- Sport: Handball
- Position: Centre back
- Current club: RK Podravka
- Number: 20
National team
Years	Team	Apps	(Gls)
–	Croatia	119	(342)

Miranda Tatari Šimunović (born 20 September 1983) is a Croatian handball player. She plays on the Croatian national team, and participated at the 2011 World Women's Handball Championship in Brazil.
