= Agnieszka Kocela =

Polish handball player (born 1988)

Personal information
- Nationality: Polish
- Born: 17 January 1988 (age 38) Jelenia Góra, Poland
- Height: 1.70 m (5 ft 7 in)

Sport
- Sport: Handball
- Position: Left wing
- Current club: SPR Lublin SSA
- Number: 6
National team
Years	Team	Apps	(Gls)
–	Poland	50	(105)

Agnieszka Kocela (born 17 January 1988) is a Polish handball player for SPR Lublin SSA and the Polish national team.
