= Andrea Kobetić =

Croatian handball player (born 1985)

Personal information
- Nationality: Croatian
- Born: 13 November 1985 (age 40) Zagreb, SR Croatia, SFR Yugoslavia
- Height: 1.86 m (6 ft 1 in)

Sport
- Sport: Handball
- Position: Left back

Senior clubs
- Years: Team
- 2003–2008: RK Lokomotiva Zagreb
- 2008–2010: RK Podravka Koprivnica
- 2010–2014: RK Krim
- 2014–2018: ŽRK Vardar
- 2018–2021: Siófok KC
National team
Years	Team	Apps	(Gls)
2006–2016	Croatia	141	(633)

Andrea Kobetić (née Penezić; born 13 November 1985) is a retired Croatian handball player who was last played for Siófok KC and the Croatia women's national handball team.

She represented Croatia at the 2008 European Women's Handball Championship, where Croatia finished 6th, and Kobetić was among the top-ten goalscorers.

She topped the Champions League goalscorers list in 2015 alongside Cristina Neagu with 102 goals.

== Achievements ==
- Croatian League
  - Winners: 2009, 2010
- Croatian Cup
  - Winners: 2009, 2010
- Slovenian First League (women's handball)
  - Winners: 2011, 2012, 2013, 2014
- Slovenian Cup
  - Winners: 2011, 2012, 2013, 2014
- Slovenian Supercup

Winners: 2014

- Macedonian First League
  - Winners: 2015,2016,2017,2018
- Macedonian Cup
  - Winners: 2015,2016,2017,2018
- EHF Champions League
  - Silver medalist: 2017, 2018
  - Third place: 2015, 2016
- EHF Cup
  - Winners: 2019

== Awards ==
- All-Star Left Back of the World Championship: 2011
- EHF Champions League Top Scorer: 2015 (with Cristina Neagu)
- EHF Cup Top Scorer: 2019
