= Slovenian First League (women's handball) =

1. slovenska rokometna liga – ženske
- Founded: 1991; 35 years ago
- No. of teams: 12
- Country: Slovenia
- Confederation: EHF
- Most recent champion: Krim (31st title)
- Most titles: Krim (31 titles)
- International cups: Champions League; EHF Cup; Challenge Cup

The Slovenian First League of women's handball (Slovene: 1. slovenska rokometna liga – ženske), also known as 1. SRL – ženske, is the top women's handball league in Slovenia. The league comprises 12 teams and is governed by the Handball Federation of Slovenia.

== List of champions ==
=== By season ===
- 1991–92 Olimpija
- 1992–93 Olimpija
- 1993–94 Olimpija
- 1994–95 Krim
- 1995–96 Krim
- 1996–97 Krim
- 1997–98 Krim
- 1998–99 Krim
- 1999–2000 Krim
- 2000–01 Krim
- 2001–02 Krim
- 2002–03 Krim
- 2003–04 Krim
- 2004–05 Krim
- 2005–06 Krim
- 2006–07 Krim
- 2007–08 Krim
- 2008–09 Krim
- 2009–10 Krim
- 2010–11 Krim
- 2011–12 Krim
- 2012–13 Krim
- 2013–14 Krim
- 2014–15 Krim
- 2015–16 Zagorje
- 2016–17 Krim
- 2017–18 Krim
- 2018–19 Krim
- 2019–20 Krim
- 2020–21 Krim
- 2021–22 Krim
- 2022–23 Krim
- 2023–24 Krim
- 2024–25 Krim
- 2025–26 Krim

=== By club ===
Club	Titles	Years won
Krim	31	1995, 1996, 1997, 1998, 1999, 2000, 2001, 2002, 2003, 2004, 2005, 2006, 2007, 2008, 2009, 2010, 2011, 2012, 2013, 2014, 2015, 2017, 2018, 2019, 2020, 2021, 2022, 2023, 2024, 2025, 2026
Olimpija	3	1992, 1993, 1994
Zagorje	1	2016

== EHF coefficient ==
Country ranking

EHF league ranking for the 2022–23 season:

- 8. (9) (Croatia) Croatian First League (57.00)
- 9. (8) (Germany) Handball Bundesliga Frauen (56.33)
- 10. (11) (Slovenia) Slovenian First League (38.17)
- 11. (10) (Sweden) SHE Women (37.40)
- 12. (13) (Poland) PGNiG Superliga (33.00)
