= Tea Grubišić =

Croatian handball player (born 1985)

Personal information
- Nationality: Croatian
- Born: 3 December 1985 (age 40) Zagreb, SR Croatia, SFR Yugoslavia
- Height: 1.76 m (5 ft 9 in)

Sport
- Sport: Handball
- Position: Left wing
- Current club: Ardeşen GSK
- Number: 3
National team
Years	Team	Apps	(Gls)
–	Croatia	27	(26)

Tea Grubišić (born December 3, 1985) is a Croatian female handballer playing in the Turkish Women's Handball Super League for Ardeşen GSK and the Croatian national team. The 1.76 m (5 ft 9 in)-tall sportswoman plays in the left wing position.

She played in her country for RK Podravka Koprivnica (2004–2005), RK Lokomotiva Zagreb (2005–2011 and 2013–2015) and ZRK Samobor (2012–2013) before she transferred to the German team SG BBM Bietigheim. Grubišić moved the next season to Turkey to play for the Rize-based team Ardeşen GSK in the Women's Super League.
