= Franziska Mietzner =

German handball player (born 1988)

Personal information
- Nationality: German
- Born: 20 December 1988 (age 37) Bad Saarow, East Germany
- Height: 1.92 m (6 ft 4 in)

Sport
- Sport: Handball
- Position: Left-back
- Current club: Retired
- Number: 26

Senior clubs
- Years: Team
- 2005–2013: Frankfurter HC
- 2013–2015: Thüringer HC
- 2015–2017: HC Leipzig
- 2017–2018: Bayer Leverkusen
National team
Years	Team	Apps	(Gls)
2009–	Germany	70	(193)
Medal record
Junior World Championship
Gold medal – first place	2008 Macedonia	Team

Franziska Mietzner (born 20 December 1988) is a former German handballer who retired in 2018 while playing for Bayer Leverkusen and the German national team in the left back position.

== Career ==
Mietzner's first club was Frankfurter HC where she played from 2005 to 2013. In 2013 she joined Thüringer HC. In 2014 and 2015 she won the German championship and the 2016 DHB-Pokal with the club. Afterward she joined HC Leipzig. For the 2017-18 season she joined Bayer 04 Leverkusen. After a season at Leipzig she retired.

In February 2012 she was selected by the readers of the magazine Handballwoche as the German handballer of the year 2011.

=== National team ===
Mietzner played on the Junior European Championship in 2007 and participated at the Junior World Championship a year later, where she led the German national team to the final triumph. In the final match, with only 10 seconds left, she scored the decisive goal against Denmark to make the scoreline 23–22, thus securing the victory and the World title for Germany. She made her full international debut on 7 March 2009 in a 37–24 win over Romania.

== Private ==
Her mother, Katrin Mietzner, was also a handball player, who won the 1978 World Championship.

== Achievements ==
- Junior World Championship:
  - Winner: 2008

== Individual awards ==
- Bundesliga Player of the Season: 2008–09
- Bundesliga Topscorer: 2008–09, 2011–12
