= Eliza Buceschi =

Romanian handball player (born 1993)

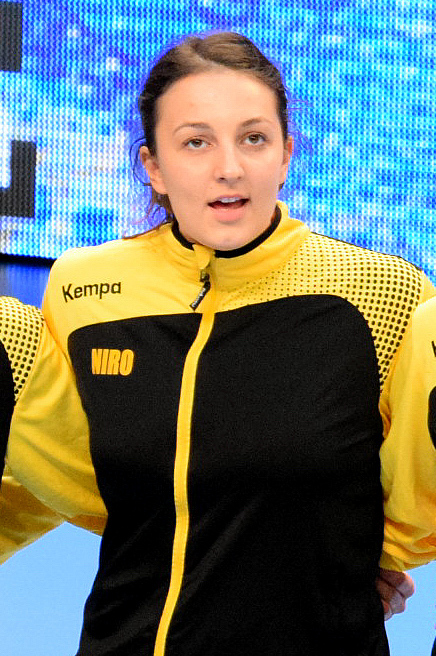

Personal information
- Full name: Eliza Iulia Buceschi
- Nationality: Romanian
- Born: 1 August 1993 (age 33) Baia Mare, Romania
- Height: 1.77 m (5 ft 10 in)

Sport
- Sport: Handball
- Position: Centre back
- Current club: Rapid București
- Number: 7

Senior clubs
- Years: Team
- 2005–2012: HCM Baia Mare
- 2012–2013: CS Oltchim Râmnicu Vâlcea
- 2012–2013: → HCM Baia Mare (loan)
- 2013–2015: HCM Baia Mare
- 2015–2016: Thüringer HC
- 2016: FC Midtjylland Håndbold
- 2017: HC Dunărea Brăila
- 2017–2020: Corona Brașov
- 2020–: Rapid București
National team
Years	Team	Apps	(Gls)
2011–	Romania	103	(244)
Medal record
World Championship
Bronze medal – third place	2015 Denmark
- Updated on 4 November 2023

Eliza Iulia Buceschi (born 1 August 1993) is a Romanian handballer for Rapid București and the Romanian national team.

== Career ==
=== Club ===
Buceschi started her career in 2005 at HCM Baia Mare. She was the best scorer with 100 goals of the Liga Naţională's 2011–12 season until a surgery on a broken finger in her right hand, ruled her out for the rest of the season starting with the month of February. This prompted a move to CS Oltchim Râmnicu Vâlcea, where she was immediately loaned to her former club. She ranked second in the 2012–2013 Cupa României's top goalscorers list. The season after she joined HCM Baia Mare on a permanent contract once again. Here she won the Romanian Cup in 2013, 2014 and 2015, the 2013 and 2014 Romanian Supercup and 2014 Romanian Championship.

In 2015 she joined German side Thüringer HC. Here she won the German Championship in 2016. In July 2016 she joined Danish side FC Midtjylland Håndbold. Already in December 2016 however she was released of her contract. She then returned to Romanian and joined HC Dunărea Brăila for the rest of the season.

The season after she joined Corona Brașov. In 2020 she joined Rapid București. Here she won the Romanian Championship in 2022.

=== International ===
In July 2012 Buceschi returned participating at the 2012 Women's Junior World Handball Championship in the Czech Republic where she finished fifth on the top scorers' list with 58 goals.

She also participated at the 2011 Women's 19 European Handball Championship in the Netherlands where she finished third on the top scorers' list with 55 goals.

Eliza Buceschi is also a member of the Romanian national team, after she made her debut on 19 October 2011 against Portugal scoring 4 goals.

In December 2018, Buceschi finished as second top scorer at the 2018 Handball Championship.

== Achievements ==
- Liga Naţională:
  - Winner: 2014, 2022
- Cupa României:
  - Winner: 2013, 2014, 2015
- Supercupa României:
  - Winner: 2013, 2014
- Bundesliga Frauen:
  - Winner: 2016

== Individual awards ==
- Romanian Hope of the Year: 2011
- HCM Baia Mare's Player of the Year: 2011
- Best Young Player of the EHF Champions League: 2015
- Handball-Planet.com World Young Female Left Back: 2014–15
