= RK Krim =

Slovenian handball team

- Full name: Rokometni klub Krim
- Nickname: Tigrice (The Tigresses)
- Founded: 1984; 42 years ago
- Arena: Ogrevalna dvorana Stožice; Arena Stožice; Tivoli Hall
- President: Iztok Verdnik
- Head coach: Rasmus Poulsen
- League: Slovenian First League
- 2025–26: Slovenian First League, 1st of 13 (champions)
- Club colours
Home	Away

Rokometni klub Krim (English: Krim Handball Club), commonly referred to as RK Krim or simply Krim, is a professional women's handball club from Ljubljana, Slovenia. Krim was founded in 1984 and has won the Slovenian Championship a record 31 times. The club has also won the EHF Champions League twice, in 2001 and 2003.

== Honours ==
=== Domestic ===
- Slovenian Championship

Winners (31): 1995, 1996, 1997, 1998, 1999, 2000, 2001, 2002, 2003, 2004, 2005, 2006, 2007, 2008, 2009, 2010, 2011, 2012, 2013, 2014, 2015, 2017, 2018, 2019, 2020, 2021, 2022, 2023, 2024, 2025, 2026

- Slovenian Cup

Winners (30): 1993, 1994, 1995, 1996, 1997, 1999, 2000, 2001, 2002, 2003, 2004, 2005, 2006, 2007, 2008, 2009, 2010, 2011, 2012, 2013, 2014, 2015, 2016, 2017, 2018, 2019, 2022, 2023, 2025, 2026

- Slovenian Supercup

Winners (9): 2014, 2015, 2016, 2017, 2018, 2019, 2022, 2023, 2026

=== International ===
- EHF Champions League

Winners (2): 2001, 2003
Runners-up (3): 1999, 2004, 2006

- EHF Champions Trophy

Winners (2): 2003, 2004
Runners-up (1): 2006

== Arena ==
RK Krim play their home league games at Ogrevalna dvorana Stožice with a seating capacity for 700 spectators. For the Women's EHF Champions League matches, they use Arena Stožice and Tivoli Hall.

- Name: Ogrevalna dvorana Stožice
- City: Ljubljana
- Capacity: 700 spectators
- Address: Vojkova cesta 100, 1000 Ljubljana
- Name: Arena Stožice
- City: Ljubljana
- Capacity: 12,480 spectators
- Address: Vojkova cesta 100, 1000 Ljubljana

== Supporters ==
RK Krim supporters are called Krimovci.

== Team ==
=== Current squad ===
Squad for the 2026–27 season

Goalkeepers

- 13 (Slovenia) Luna Mija Zupan
- 16 (Slovenia) Maja Vojnovič
- 61 (Serbia) Jovana Risović

Left wingers

- 17 (Slovenia) Tinkara Kogovšek
- 89 (Austria) Eleonora Stanković

Right wingers

- 71 (Slovenia) Ema Marija Marković
- 72 (Slovenia) Elena Erceg
- 97 (Austria) Philomena Egger

Line players

- 2 (Angola) Liliane Martins Mario
- 6 (Slovenia) Lana Puncer

Left backs

- 4 (Austria) Andrea Barnjak
- 11 (Slovenia) Ana Abina
- 20 (Angola) Stelvia Pascoal
- 21 (Slovenia) Liana Vuković
- 47 (Slovenia) Nina Kovšca

Central backs

- 7 (Slovenia) Lara Ermenc
- 18 (Slovenia) Nina Zulić

Right backs

- 19 (Denmark) Anne With Johansen
- 38 (Denmark) Alberte Kielstrup Madsen

=== Staff members ===
- Head coach: Rasmus Poulsen
- Assistant coach: Vanja Kralj
- Goalkeeping coach: Aljaž Pavlič
- Kinesiologist: Luka Terglav
- Head of the medical service: Aldin Muharemović
- Team leader: Jaka Kravanja
- Team doctor: Klemen Stražar

== European matches ==
All results (home and away) list Krim's goal tally first.

Season	Competition	Round	Club	Home	Away
1993–94	Cup Winners' Cup	Round of 32	(Switzerland) ATV Basel	24–15	24–15
1993–94	Cup Winners' Cup	Round of 16	(Italy) Jomsa Rimini	29–19	26–21
1993–94	Cup Winners' Cup	Quarter-final	(Germany) TUS Walle Bremen	21–22	14–26
1994–95	Cup Winners' Cup	Round of 32	(North Macedonia) Vardar Skopje	29–20	26–24
1994–95	Cup Winners' Cup	Round of 16	(Romania) Chimistul Râmnicu Vâlcea	32–22	24–32
1994–95	Cup Winners' Cup	Quarter-final	(Germany) Borussia Dortmund	20–28	24–24
1995–96	Champions League	Round of 32	(Azerbaijan) Khalita Baku	w/o	
1995–96	Champions League	Round of 16	(Denmark) Viborg	25–18	15–22
1996–97	Champions League	Round of 32	(Bulgaria) Volan Sofia	25–16	31–14
1996–97	Champions League	Group stage (Group D)	(Greece) GAS Anagenisi Artas	36–12	33–19
1996–97	Champions League	Group stage (Group D)	(Germany) TUS Walle Bremen	21–20	19–20
1996–97	Champions League	Group stage (Group D)	(Hungary) Ferencvárosi	22–20	24–27
1996–97	Champions League	Quarter-final	(Austria) Hypo Niederösterreich	21–26	21–34
1997–98	Champions League	Round of 32	(Turkey) YKM Istanbul	33–27	34–25
1997–98	Champions League	Group stage (Group B)	(France) ASPTT Metz	31–25	26–30
1997–98	Champions League	Group stage (Group B)	(Hungary) Ferencvárosi	32–24	25–23
1997–98	Champions League	Group stage (Group B)	(Spain) Mar El Osito L'Eliana	30–33	18–35
1997–98	Champions League	Quarter-final	(Croatia) Podravka Koprivnica	28–23	20–25
1998–99	Champions League	Round of 32	(Belarus) Politechnik Minsk	39–29	30–22
1998–99	Champions League	Group stage (Group A)	(France) E.S.B.F. Besançon	19–15	25–20
1998–99	Champions League	Group stage (Group A)	(Croatia) Podravka Koprivnica	26–27	20–21
1998–99	Champions League	Group stage (Group A)	(North Macedonia) Kometal Gjorče Petrov Skopje	31–27	17–23
1998–99	Champions League	Quarter-final	(Spain) Milar l Eliana Valencia	23–25	29–21
1998–99	Champions League	Semi-final	(Federal Republic of Yugoslavia) Budućnost	26–29	32–29
1998–99	Champions League	Final	(Hungary) Dunaferr	26–26	23–25
1998–99	Champions Trophy	Semi-final	(Norway) Bækkelagets	24–27	
1998–99	Champions Trophy	Third place	(Denmark) Viborg	34–27	
1999–2000	Champions League	Round of 32	(Turkey) Anadolu Uni Eskisehir	33–15	26–17
1999–2000	Champions League	Group stage (Group B)	(Austria) Hypo Niederösterreich	27–28	24–24
1999–2000	Champions League	Group stage (Group B)	(Ukraine) Motor Zaporoshje	33–18	21–22
1999–2000	Champions League	Group stage (Group B)	(Norway) Bækkelagets	25–22	23–32
2000–01	Champions League	Group stage (Group D)	(Spain) Milar L'Eliana Valencia	30–19	21–30
2000–01	Champions League	Group stage (Group D)	(Ukraine) Spartak Kyiv	28–22	26–21
2000–01	Champions League	Group stage (Group D)	(Hungary) Győri	27–27	21–21
2000–01	Champions League	Quarter-final	(Norway) Larvik	29–17	20–24
2000–01	Champions League	Semi-final	(Federal Republic of Yugoslavia) Budućnost	28–21	25–27
2000–01	Champions League	Final	(Denmark) Viborg	25–19	22–22
2000–01	Champions Trophy	Semi-final	(Ukraine) Motor Zaporoshje	22–26	
2000–01	Champions Trophy	Third place	(Norway) Nordstrand 2000	34–21	
2001–02	Champions League	Group stage (Group D)	(Poland) MKS Montex Lublin	26–32	24–27
2001–02	Champions League	Group stage (Group D)	(Russia) Dinamo Volgograd	22–21	24–22
2001–02	Champions League	Group stage (Group D)	(North Macedonia) Kometal Gjorče Petrov Skopje	26–22	27–26
2002–03	Champions League	Group stage (Group D)	(Federal Republic of Yugoslavia) Budućnost	32–29	27–19
2002–03	Champions League	Group stage (Group D)	(Spain) Ferrobus KU Mislata	31–27	28–26
2002–03	Champions League	Group stage (Group D)	(France) Metz Handball	34–22	31–25
2002–03	Champions League	Quarter-final	(Norway) Larvik	33–28	21–22
2002–03	Champions League	Semi-final	(Denmark) Midtjylland Håndbold	28–21	27–21
2002–03	Champions League	Final	(Spain) Milar L'Eliana Valencia	36–28	27–30
2002–03	Champions Trophy	Semi-final	(France) E.S.B.F. Besançon	32–26	
2002–03	Champions Trophy	Final	(Denmark) Slagelse	33–28	
2003–04	Champions League	Group stage (Group D)	(Serbia and Montenegro) Budućnost	35–25	24–26
2003–04	Champions League	Group stage (Group D)	(Ukraine) HC "Motor" Zaporozhye	34–22	33–26
2003–04	Champions League	Group stage (Group D)	(Denmark) Midtjylland Håndbold	24–27	24–28
2003–04	Champions League	Quarter-final	(Russia) Lada Togliatti	29–25	21–24
2003–04	Champions League	Semi-final	(Norway) Larvik	27–19	33–30
2003–04	Champions League	Final	(Denmark) Slagelse	32–36	24–25
2003–04	Champions Trophy	Group stage (Group B)	(Denmark) Viborg	33–28	
2003–04	Champions Trophy	Group stage (Group B)	(North Macedonia) Kometal Gjorče Petrov Skopje	34–32	
2003–04	Champions Trophy	Final	(Austria) Hypo Niederösterreich	34–25	
2004–05	Champions League	Group stage (Group D)	(Serbia and Montenegro) Niš	40–30	23–24
2004–05	Champions League	Group stage (Group D)	(Norway) Tertnes Bergen	32–18	24–22
2004–05	Champions League	Group stage (Group D)	(Spain) Orsan Elda Prestigio	28–22	30–25
2004–05	Champions League	Quarter-final	(North Macedonia) Kometal Gjorče Petrov Skopje	23–21	21–24
2005–06	Champions League	Group stage (Group A)	(Denmark) Viborg	26–21	34–28
2005–06	Champions League	Group stage (Group A)	(Spain) Orsan Elda Prestigio	29–26	25–17
2005–06	Champions League	Group stage (Group A)	(Norway) Larvik	24–19	23–29
2005–06	Champions League	Quarter-final	(Russia) Lada Togliatti	25–18	29–36
2005–06	Champions League	Semi-final	(Denmark) Aalborg	30–31	24–16
2005–06	Champions League	Final	(Denmark) Viborg	22–24	21–20
2005–06	Champions Trophy	Semi-final	(Hungary) FTC Budapest	34–25	
2005–06	Champions Trophy	Final	(Denmark) Viborg	26–31	
2006–07	Champions League	Group stage (Group A)	(Spain) Cem. la Union-Ribarroja	34–28	33–31
2006–07	Champions League	Group stage (Group A)	(Denmark) Aalborg	30–26	24–26
2006–07	Champions League	Group stage (Group A)	(Russia) Dinamo Volgograd	41–33	34–29
2006–07	Champions League	Quarter-final	(Denmark) Slagelse DT	26–28	23–30
2007–08	Champions League	Group stage (Group B)	(Germany) 1. FC Nürnberg	30–31	24–26
2007–08	Champions League	Group stage (Group B)	(Denmark) Sävehof	24–24	31–30
2007–08	Champions League	Group stage (Group B)	(Russia) Zvezda Zvenigorod	35–33	31–36
2007–08	Cup Winners' Cup	1/8 Final	(Croatia) Lokomotiva Zagreb	31–25	25–30
2007–08	Cup Winners' Cup	Quarter-final	(Romania) Rulmentul-Urban Braşov	27–29	25–27
2008–09	Champions League	Group stage (Group D)	(Germany) 1. FC Nürnberg	33–25	29–25
2008–09	Champions League	Group stage (Group D)	(Denmark) Viborg	38–34	28–38
2008–09	Champions League	Group stage (Group D)	(France) Metz Handball	26–31	33–29
2008–09	Champions League	Main round (Group 2)	(Montenegro) Budućnost	35–28	32–37
2008–09	Champions League	Main round (Group 2)	(Hungary) Györi Audi ETO KC	31–35	33–34
2008–09	Champions League	Main round (Group 2)	(Romania) Oltchim Râmnicu Vâlcea	35–34	30–36
2009–10	Champions League	Group stage (Group B)	(Austria) Hypo Niederösterreich	35–24	26–28
2009–10	Champions League	Group stage (Group B)	(Denmark) Aalborg	30–23	38–32
2009–10	Champions League	Group stage (Group B)	(France) Metz Handball	35–31	37–30
2009–10	Champions League	Main round (Group 1)	(Hungary) Győri Audi ETO KC	24–24	23–25
2009–10	Champions League	Main round (Group 1)	(Germany) Leipzig	32–26	31–27
2009–10	Champions League	Main round (Group 1)	(Norway) Larvik	30–34	23–30
2010–11	Champions League	Group stage (Group 4)	(Hungary) Győri Audi ETO KC	30–34	21–26
2010–11	Champions League	Group stage (Group 4)	(Croatia) Podravka Vegeta	26–22	35–30
2010–11	Champions League	Group stage (Group 4)	(Russia) Zvezda Zvenigorod	37–32	32–28
2010–11	Champions League	Main round (Group 1)	(Romania) Oltchim Râmnicu Vâlcea	37–30	27–31
2010–11	Champions League	Main round (Group 1)	(Spain) Itxako Reyno De Navarra	30–26	24–25
2010–11	Champions League	Main round (Group 1)	(Montenegro) Budućnost	36–40	29–32
2011–12	Champions League	Group stage (Group B)	(Norway) Larvik	19–22	19–31
2011–12	Champions League	Group stage (Group B)	(Croatia) Podravka Vegeta	22–22	24–23
2011–12	Champions League	Group stage (Group B)	(Denmark) Viborg	31–25	28–28
2011–12	Champions League	Main round (Group 2)	(France) Metz Handball	28–24	21–20
2011–12	Champions League	Main round (Group 2)	(Romania) Oltchim Râmnicu Vâlcea	25–31	26–30
2011–12	Champions League	Main round (Group 2)	(Montenegro) Budućnost	26–27	21–29
2012–13	Champions League	Group stage (Group B)	(Romania) Universitatea Cluj	28–27	31–23
2012–13	Champions League	Group stage (Group B)	(Croatia) Podravka Vegeta	28–22	22–25
2012–13	Champions League	Group stage (Group B)	(Hungary) Győri Audi ETO KC	20–31	22–29
2012–13	Champions League	Main round (Group 2)	(Russia) Zvezda Zvenigorod	27–23	29–24
2012–13	Champions League	Main round (Group 2)	(Romania) Oltchim Râmnicu Vâlcea	28–24	20–23
2012–13	Champions League	Main round (Group 2)	(Hungary) FTC-Rail Cargo Hungaria	31–25	26–30
2012–13	Champions League	Semi-final	(Norway) Larvik	19–27	24–22
2013–14	Champions League	Group stage (Group C)	(Sweden) Sävehof	36–28	25–25
2013–14	Champions League	Group stage (Group C)	(Germany) Leipzig	32–20	27–23
2013–14	Champions League	Group stage (Group C)	(France) Metz Handball	27–21	20–21
2013–14	Champions League	Main round (Group 2)	(Norway) Larvik	24–18	22–28
2013–14	Champions League	Main round (Group 2)	(Montenegro) Budućnost	26–30	15–30
2013–14	Champions League	Main round (Group 2)	(Hungary) Győri Audi ETO KC	22–24	24–27
2014–15	Champions League	Group stage (Group A)	(Austria) Hypo Niederösterreich	32–20	25–29
2014–15	Champions League	Group stage (Group A)	(Germany) Leipzig	31–35	24–30
2014–15	Champions League	Group stage (Group A)	(Russia) Dinamo Volgograd	24–26	26–25
2014–15	Champions League	Main round (Group 1)	(Germany) Thüringer	23–26	21–33
2014–15	Champions League	Main round (Group 1)	(North Macedonia) Vardar	29–47	30–41
2014–15	Champions League	Main round (Group 1)	(Montenegro) Budućnost	20–23	20–39
2015–16	Champions League	Group stage (Group A)	(Romania) Baia Mare	27–33	28–35
2015–16	Champions League	Group stage (Group A)	(Russia) Rostov-Don	31–36	25–35
2015–16	Champions League	Group stage (Group A)	(Norway) Larvik	21–37	28–32
2015–16	Cup Winners' Cup	Round of 16	(Romania) SCM Craiova	27–23	29–30
2015–16	Cup Winners' Cup	Quarter-final	(Norway) Vipers Kristiansand	30–20	27–29
2015–16	Cup Winners' Cup	Semi-final	(Russia) Lada Togliatti	22–27	24–28
2016–17	Champions League	Qualifying (Group 3)	(Slovakia) IUVENTA Michalovce	28–22	—
2016–17	Champions League	Qualifying (Group 3)	(Italy) Indeco Conversano	37–16	—
2016–17	Champions League	Group stage (Group D)	(Norway) Larvik	24–22	36–31
2016–17	Champions League	Group stage (Group D)	(Denmark) Team Esbjerg	27–22	25–35
2016–17	Champions League	Group stage (Group D)	(Sweden) IK Sävehof	32–29	24–26
2016–17	Champions League	Main round (Group 2)	(Hungary) Győri Audi ETO KC	17–34	22–39
2016–17	Champions League	Main round (Group 2)	(Romania) CSM București	21–24	26–28
2016–17	Champions League	Main round (Group 2)	(Denmark) Midtjylland Håndbold	21–27	19–28
2017–18	Champions League	Group stage (Group A)	(Romania) CSM București	30–33	18–30
2017–18	Champions League	Group stage (Group A)	(Denmark) Nykøbing Falster	27–26	26–28
2017–18	Champions League	Group stage (Group A)	(Poland) Vistal Gdynia	29–22	29–19
2017–18	Champions League	Main round (Group 1)	(Denmark) Midtjylland Håndbold	24–23	24–24
2017–18	Champions League	Main round (Group 1)	(Russia) Rostov-Don	26–35	22–29
2017–18	Champions League	Main round (Group 1)	(Hungary) Győri Audi ETO KC	21–32	25–34
2018–19	Champions League	Group stage (Group C)	(Hungary) Győri Audi ETO KC	23–32	23–39
2018–19	Champions League	Group stage (Group C)	(Germany) Thüringer HC	27–20	26–26
2018–19	Champions League	Group stage (Group C)	(Croatia) Podravka Koprivnica	27–20	27–27
2018–19	Champions League	Main round (Group 2)	(Norway) Vipers Kristiansand	24–25	21–29
2018–19	Champions League	Main round (Group 2)	(Romania) CSM București	23–22	26–32
2018–19	Champions League	Main round (Group 2)	(Hungary) FTC-Rail Cargo Hungaria	23–25	27–31
2019–20	Champions League	Group stage (Group D)	(Czech Republic) DHK Baník Most	29–31	31–26
2019–20	Champions League	Group stage (Group D)	(Sweden) IK Sävehof	26–28	25–21
2019–20	Champions League	Group stage (Group D)	(Hungary) Győri Audi ETO KC	21–33	26–31
2019–20	Champions League	Main round (Group 2)	(Romania) SCM Râmnicu Vâlcea	28–28	16–31
2019–20	Champions League	Main round (Group 2)	(France) Brest Bretagne Handball	25–29	26–37
2019–20	Champions League	Main round (Group 2)	(Montenegro) Budućnost	29–23	28–30
2020–21	Champions League	Group stage (Group A)	(Norway) Vipers Kristiansand	26–27	30–37
2020–21	Champions League	Group stage (Group A)	(Russia) Rostov-Don	28–27	23–23
2020–21	Champions League	Group stage (Group A)	(Denmark) Team Esbjerg	0–10	23–33
2020–21	Champions League	Group stage (Group A)	(France) Metz Handball	22–26	27–33
2020–21	Champions League	Group stage (Group A)	(Germany) SG BBM Bietigheim	28–26	22–22
2020–21	Champions League	Group stage (Group A)	(Hungary) FTC-Rail Cargo Hungaria	26–32	25–32
2020–21	Champions League	Group stage (Group A)	(Romania) CSM București	23–25	22–22
2020–21	Champions League	Round of 16	(Russia) CSKA Moscow	25–20	21–27
2021–22	Champions League	Group stage (Group B)	(Sweden) IK Sävehof	32–18	28–29
2021–22	Champions League	Group stage (Group B)	(Hungary) Győri Audi ETO KC	26–31	27–40
2021–22	Champions League	Group stage (Group B)	(Turkey) Kastamonu Bld. GSK	36–28	24–23
2021–22	Champions League	Group stage (Group B)	(France) Metz Handball	28–29	27–27
2021–22	Champions League	Group stage (Group B)	(Denmark) Odense Håndbold	19–24	24–26
2021–22	Champions League	Group stage (Group B)	(Norway) Vipers Kristiansand	26–27	20–37
2021–22	Champions League	Group stage (Group B)	(Russia) CSKA Moscow	24–21	21–21
2021–22	Champions League	Playoffs	(Hungary) FTC-Rail Cargo Hungaria	33–26	22–26
2021–22	Champions League	Quarter-final	(Norway) Vipers Kristiansand	25–32	24–33
2022–23	Champions League	Group stage (Group A)	(Romania) CSM București	28–26	28–30
2022–23	Champions League	Group stage (Group A)	(Norway) Vipers Kristiansand	21–27	31–36
2022–23	Champions League	Group stage (Group A)	(Czech Republic) DHK Baník Most	42–31	42–29
2022–23	Champions League	Group stage (Group A)	(Hungary) FTC-Rail Cargo Hungaria	30–32	26–37
2022–23	Champions League	Group stage (Group A)	(Germany) SG BBM Bietigheim	35–28	23–30
2022–23	Champions League	Group stage (Group A)	(France) Brest Bretagne Handball	24–22	24–22
2022–23	Champions League	Group stage (Group A)	(Denmark) Odense Håndbold	23–29	22–26
2022–23	Champions League	Playoffs	(Romania) CS Rapid București	29–24	24–30
2023–24	Champions League	Group stage (Group B)	(Poland) MKS Zagłębie Lubin	32–19	36–18
2023–24	Champions League	Group stage (Group B)	(Denmark) Team Esbjerg	33–27	21–29
2023–24	Champions League	Group stage (Group B)	(Hungary) FTC-Rail Cargo Hungaria	32–26	28–26
2023–24	Champions League	Group stage (Group B)	(Denmark) Ikast Håndbold	28–34	32–33
2023–24	Champions League	Group stage (Group B)	(Norway) Vipers Kristiansand	24–24	23–29
2023–24	Champions League	Group stage (Group B)	(Romania) CS Rapid București	25–24	22–27
2023–24	Champions League	Group stage (Group B)	(France) Metz Handball	22–28	31–40
2023–24	Champions League	Playoffs	(Romania) CSM București	24–30	24–30

== Head coach history ==
- (Socialist Federal Republic of Yugoslavia) Cveta Benet (1985–1991)
- (Slovenia) Marta Bon (1991–1994)
- (Slovenia) Andrej Kavčič (1994–1995)
- (Czech Republic) Jiří Zerzáň (1995–1996)
- (Croatia) Vinko Kandija (1996–2000)
- (Slovenia) Tone Tiselj (2000–2006)
- (Slovenia) Robert Beguš (2006–2007)
- (Slovenia) Bojan Čotar (2007–2008)
- (Slovenia) Marta Bon (2008–2011)
- (Slovenia) Tone Tiselj (2011–2014)
- (Slovenia) Marta Bon (2014–2016)
- (Slovenia) Uroš Bregar (2016–2021)
- (Slovenia) Nataliya Derepasko (2021–2022)
- (Montenegro) Dragan Adžić (2022–2024)
- (Spain) Ambros Martín (2024–2025)
- (Slovenia) Žiga Novak (2025–2026)
- (Denmark) Rasmus Poulsen (2026–present)
