= Dorina Korsós =

Hungarian handball player (born 1995)

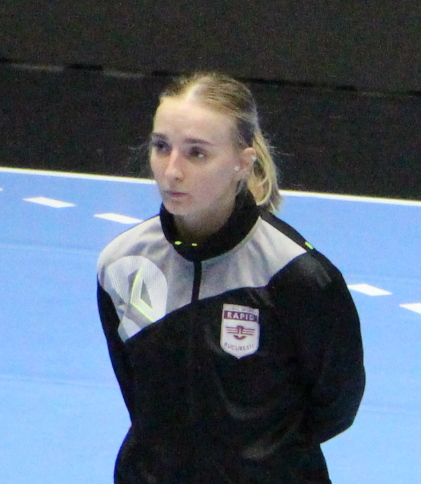

Personal information
- Nationality: Hungarian
- Born: 3 September 1995 (age 31) Kecskemét, Hungary
- Height: 1.68 m (5 ft 6 in)

Sport
- Sport: Handball
- Position: Left Wing
- Current club: CS Rapid București
- Number: 20

Youth career
- Years: Team
- –2010: Kecskeméti NKSE

Senior clubs
- Years: Team
- 2010–2012: Kecskeméti NKSE
- 2012–2021: Győri ETO KC
- 2017–2021: → TuS Metzingen (loan)
- 2021–2022: Debreceni VSC
- 2022–: CS Rapid București
National team
Years	Team	Apps	(Gls)
2015–	Hungary	10	(6)
Medal record
Junior European Championship
Silver medal – second place	2013 Denmark

Dorina Korsós (Hungarian pronunciation: [ˈdorinɒ ˈkorʃoːʃ]; born 3 September 1995 in Kecskemét) is a Hungarian handballer who plays for CS Rapid București.

== Achievements ==
- EHF Champions League:
  - Winner: 2013, 2014, 2017
- Nemzeti Bajnokság I:
  - Winner: 2012, 2013, 2014, 2016, 2017
- Magyar Kupa:
  - Winner: 2012, 2013, 2014, 2015, 2016
- Liga Națională:
  - Winner: 2022

== Individual awards ==
- Best Defender of the EHF Champions League: 2015
