= Nadja Nadgornaja =

German handball player (born 1988)

Nadja Månsson
Personal information
- Nationality: German
- Born: 22 September 1988 (age 38) Kiev, Ukraine
- Height: 1.86 m (6 ft 1 in)

Sport
- Sport: Handball
- Position: Left back
- Current club: Borussia Dortmund
- Number: 33

Senior clubs
- Years: Team
- –2004: Neusser HV
- 2004–2008: HSG Blomberg-Lippe
- 2008–2010: DJK/MJC Trier
- 2010–2015: Thüringer HC
- 2015–2019: Borussia Dortmund
National team
Years	Team	Apps	(Gls)
2009–2017	Germany	78	(245)

Nadja Månsson (née Nadgornaja; 22 September 1988) is a German former handball player for Borussia Dortmund.

She participated at the 2011 World Women's Handball Championship in Brazil.

== Individual awards ==
- Carpathian Trophy Top Scorer: 2013
- Bundesliga Top Scorer: 2013
