= Linn-Kristin Riegelhuth Koren =

Norwegian handball player (born 1984)

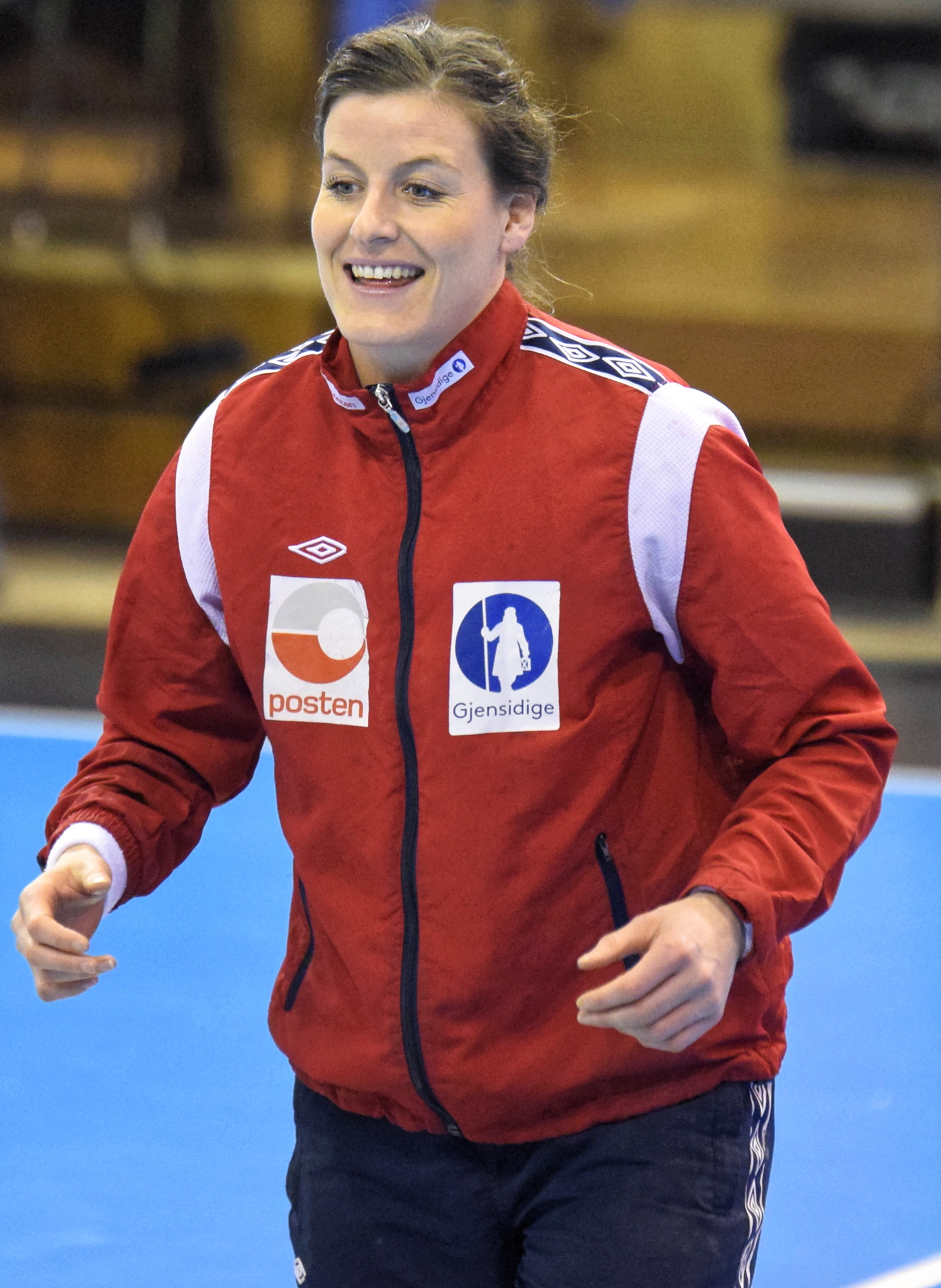

Personal information
- Nationality: Norwegian
- Born: 1 August 1984 (age 42) Ski, Norway
- Height: 1.75 m (5 ft 9 in)

Sport
- Sport: Handball
- Position: Right wing

Youth career
- Years: Team
- –: Ski
- –: Holmlia
- –: Furuset

Senior clubs
- Years: Team
- 2001–2002: Furuset IL
- 2002–2009: Larvik HK
- 2009–2010: FCK Håndbold
- 2010–2017: Larvik HK
National team
Years	Team	Apps	(Gls)
2003–2016	Norway	279	(971)
Medal record
Olympic Games
Gold medal – first place	2008 Beijing	Team
Gold medal – first place	2012 London	Team
Bronze medal – third place	2016 Rio de Janeiro	Team
World Championship
Gold medal – first place	2011 Brazil
Silver medal – second place	2007 France
Bronze medal – third place	2009 China
European Championship
Gold medal – first place	2004 Hungary
Gold medal – first place	2006 Sweden
Gold medal – first place	2008 Macedonia
Gold medal – first place	2010 Denmark/Norway
Gold medal – first place	2014 Croatia/Hungary
Silver medal – second place	2012 Serbia

Linn-Kristin Riegelhuth Koren (born 1 August 1984) is a retired Norwegian handball player for the Norwegian national team, who last played for Larvik HK. She is commonly known as Linka. Outside handball she is a qualified nurse.

She was included in the European Handball Federation Hall of Fame in 2023.

== Career ==
=== Club career ===
Riegelhuth started playing handball at her hometown club Ski. She later played for Holmlia and Furuset until Larvik HK showed an interest for her. She was only 17 when she signed with Larvik for the 2002/03 season.

Riegelhuth was top scorer in the Norwegian league in the 2005/06 season (shared first place with Linn Jørum Sulland, both 159 goals). In 2006/07 she was again top scorer (221 goals), and was voted Player of the year in the Norwegian league. She won the Cup Winners' Cup in 2008 with Larvik. She also participated on the Champions League 2008/09 and was top scorer of the competition until Larvik was eliminated.

In January 2009, Riegelhuth signed a two-year contract with Danish club FCK Håndbold where she will start playing at the end of the 2008/09 season.

=== National team ===
She made her debut on the Norwegian national team in 2003, and played 279 matches and scored 971 goals. She is a five time European champion from 2004, 2006, 2008, 2010 and 2014. She was the top scorer in the 2008 European Championship and was also awarded a place in the all-star team as Best Right Wing. She received a silver medal at the 2007 World Women's Handball Championship and a gold medal at the 2008 Summer Olympics and at the 2012 Summer Olympics.

== Personal life ==
She's the older sister of fellow handball player, Betina Riegelhuth. On 25 June 2011, Linn-Kristin Riegelhuth married Einar Sand Koren, and changed her name to Linn-Kristin Riegelhuth Koren. In May 2015 she announced that she and her husband was expecting their first child, and had to take a break from handball. After giving birth 22 December 2015, Riegelhuth Koren was back playing for Larvik against Rælingen HK on 2 March 2016.

In October 2017 she announced that she's expecting her second child, but she will come back on court again.

Today she has three kids: Lotte, Pelle and Lasse together with Einar.

== Team results ==
Club

- Champions League: Semi-finalist in 2003/04 (Larvik), Winner in 2010/11 (Larvik)
- Cup Winners' Cup: Winner in 2004/05 and 2007/08 (Larvik)
- Norwegian Championship: Winner in 2004, 2005, 2006, 2007 and 2008 (Larvik)
- Norwegian Cup: Winner in 2003, 2004, 2005, 2006 and 2008; Runner-up in 2007 (Larvik)

National team

- European Championship: Gold in 2004, 2006, 2008, 2010 and 2014; Silver in 2012
- World Championship: Silver in 2007; Gold in 2011
- Summer Olympics: Gold in 2008 and 2012; Bronze in 2016

== Awards and recognition ==
- Player of the year of the Norwegian league in 2007
- Right wing on the All-Star Team and Top scorer of the 2008 European Championship
- Right wing on the All-Star Team in the 2009 World Championship
- Awarded Tønsbergs Blad's yearly price, Kristinastatuetten, in 2008
- Voted female World Handball Player of the Year 2008 by a jury of experts from the IHF
- All-Star Team Best Right Wing of the EHF Champions League: 2015
- She was awarded the Håndballstatuetten trophy from the Norwegian Handball Federation in 2021.
- EHF Hall of Fame in 2023.

Awards
Preceded by Gro Hammerseng	IHF World Player of the Year – Women; 2008	Succeeded by Allison Pineau
