= Cristina Neagu =

Romanian handball player (born 1988)

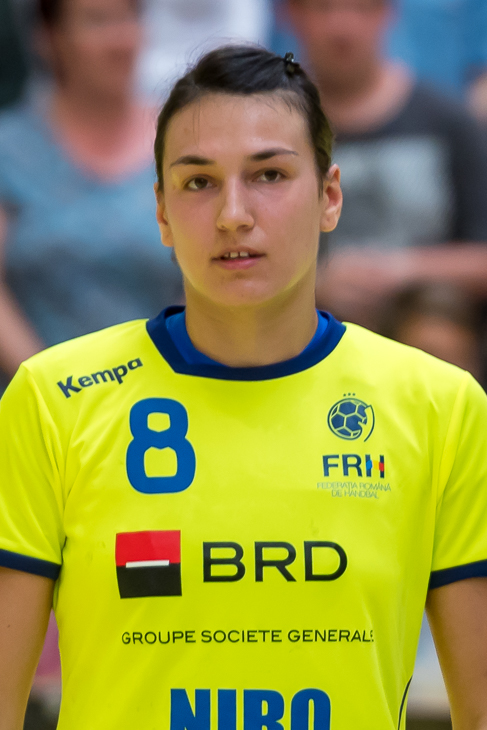
- Neagu in 2017

Personal information
- Full name: Cristina Georgiana Neagu
- Nationality: Romanian
- Born: 26 August 1988 (age 38) Bucharest, Romania
- Height: 1.80 m (5 ft 11 in)

Sport
- Sport: Handball
- Position: Left back

Youth career
- Years: Team
- –: CSŞ 5 București

Senior clubs
- Years: Team
- –2006: HC Activ Ploiești
- 2006–2009: CS Rulmentul Brașov
- 2009–2013: CS Oltchim Râmnicu Vâlcea
- 2013–2017: ŽRK Budućnost
- 2017–2025: CSM București
National team
| Years | Team | Apps | (Gls) |
| 2006–2023 | Romania | 221 | (972) |
Medal record
World Championship
| Bronze medal – third place | 2015 Denmark |
European Championship
| Bronze medal – third place | 2010 Denmark/Norway |
World Youth Championship
| Bronze medal – third place | 2006 Canada |
European Junior Championship
| Bronze medal – third place | 2007 Turkey |
European Youth Championship
| Silver medal – second place | 2005 Austria |
- Updated on 4 November 2023

Cristina Georgiana Neagu (Romanian pronunciation: [krisˈtina ˈne̯aɡu]; born 26 August 1988) is a Romanian former professional handballer.

Often considered the best player in the world and rated by many in the sport as the greatest of all time, Neagu is the only female handball player in history to win four IHF World Player of the Year awards (in 2010, 2015, 2016 and 2018). She also won the EHF Player of the Year award in 2017 and 2018 (a record). She has been selected to the All-EHF Champions League All-Star Team seven times (2015–18 and 2020–22).

A prolific goalscorer, Neagu is the European Championship's all-time leader in goals scored (303). She was the 2015 World Championship top-scorer and was named MVP of the tournament. She also finished as the top scorer of the EHF Champions League in the 2014–15, 2017–18 and 2021–22 seasons.

Neagu was given the award of Cetățean de onoare ("Honorary Citizen") of the city of Bucharest in 2017.

== Early life ==
Cristina Neagu is the daughter of Vasilica and Constantin Neagu. She was born in Bucharest, Romania, and grew up in Ghencea district, being the youngest of three siblings. Maria Covaci, local middle school coach, introduced her to handball when she was 12 years old.

== Professional career ==
=== Injury ===
During the 2010–11 season, her right shoulder cartilage was damaged. On 10 October 2012, Neagu returned to play in the Romanian Women's Handball League, 605 days (approximately 1 year and 7 months) after suffering the injury and after she received long-term treatment in the United States.

She got seriously injured again during a training session in January 2013. Neagu was out for six months after undergoing surgery on her left knee after rupturing her cruciate ligaments.

=== Comeback and later career ===
After nearly two-and-a-half years of injuries, Neagu again reached the final stage of the Champions League, this time in 2014 with Montenegrin side Budućnost.

On 21 December 2014, she was awarded best left back of the 2014 European Championship. She was also among the tournament top goalscorers, ranking second.

After an outstanding 2013–14 season, she got nominated again for the IHF World Player of the Year Award, but this time she lost to Eduarda Amorim being named second best player in the world with 25.8% of the votes.

Neagu won her first Champions League trophy in 2015 after an outstanding season, topping the goalscorers list alongside Andrea Penezić and being voted the best left back of the competition.

She was named MVP player at the 2015 World Championship in Denmark, where she scored 63 goals – being the top goalscorer in the competition.

Neagu reached the final stage of the Champions League three times (in 2010, 2014 and 2015). She has been a member of the European Championship All-Star Team three times (2010, 2014 and 2016). She received a bronze medal at the 2010 European Championship, being also the top scorer of the competition and having the most assists.

A bad injury sidelined Neagu once again in the final main round match against Hungary at the 2018 European Championship when she was in a commanding position to finish as top scorer. She tore her ACL and had to undergo surgery on her right knee.

During Neagu's final professional match in Bucharest on 8 June 2025, Romanian president Nicușor Dan made an appearance, praising her career.

== Personal life ==
Neagu is a fan of football and a supporter of local team FCSB. She attends their matches at the Arena Națională stadium.

== Achievements ==
=== National ===
- Romanian National League:
  - Winner: 2009, 2010, 2011, 2012, 2013, 2018, 2021, 2023, 2024, 2025
  - Silver Medalist: 2007, 2008, 2019, 2022
- Romanian Cup:
  - Winner: 2011, 2018, 2019, 2022, 2023, 2024, 2025
  - Finalist: 2007, 2020, 2021
- Romanian Supercup:
  - Winner: 2011, 2017, 2019, 2022, 2023, 2024, 2025
  - Finalist: 2007, 2018, 2020, 2021
- Montenegrin Championship:
  - Winner: 2014, 2015, 2016, 2017
- Montenegrin Cup:
  - Winner: 2014, 2015, 2016, 2017

=== International ===
- EHF Champions League:
  - Winner: 2015
  - Finalist: 2010, 2014
  - Third place: 2009, 2012, 2013, 2018
- EHF Cup Winners' Cup:
  - Finalist: 2008
- World Championship:
  - Bronze Medalist: 2015
- European Championship:
  - Bronze Medalist: 2010
- World Youth Championship:
  - Bronze Medalist: 2006
- European Youth Championship:
  - Silver Medalist: 2005
- European Junior Championship:
  - Bronze Medalist: 2007

=== Individual ===
IHF

- 4× IHF World Player of the Year: 2010, 2015, 2016, 2018
- IHF World Rookie of the Year: 2009
- World Championship Most Valuable Player: 2015
- World Championship Top Scorer: 2015
- World Championship All-Star Team Left Back: 2015
- World Youth Championship Most Valuable Player: 2006

EHF

- 2× EHF Player of the Year: 2017, 2018
- European Championship All-Time Top Scorer (303 goals)
- European Championship Top Scorer: 2010
- European Championship Most Assists: 2010
- 4× European Championship All-Star Team Left Back: 2010, 2014, 2016, 2022
- European Youth Championship Most Valuable Player: 2005
- European Junior Championship All-Star Team Left Back: 2007
- Cup Winners' Cup Top Scorer: 2008
- 3× Champions League Top Scorer: 2015, 2018, 2022
- 7× Champions League All-Star Team Left Back: 2015, 2016, 2017, 2018, 2020, 2021, 2022
- EHF Excellence Awards Best left back of the season: 2022/23

National

- 6× Romanian Player of the Year: 2009, 2010, 2015, 2016, 2017, 2018
- Romanian Sportsperson of the Year: 2015
- Brașov County Sportsperson of the Year: 2008
- Top Scorer of the Liga Națională: 2022
- All-Star Left Back of the Liga Națională: 2021
- 2× Most Valuable Player of the Liga Națională: 2020, 2021
- 3× Liga Națională Best Romanian Player: 2017, 2018, 2019
- Cupa României Final Four Most Valuable Player: 2018
- 3× Pro Sport Most Valuable Player of the Liga Națională: 2018, 2020 2021
- 3× Pro Sport All-Star Team Left Back of the Liga Națională: 2018, 2020 2021

Other

- 3× Handball-Planet World Player of the Year: 2015, 2016, 2018
- 6× Handball-Planet All-Star Team Left Back: 2014, 2015, 2016, 2017, 2018 2020
- TV 2 Norway World Player of the Year: 2018
- TV 2 Norway All-Star Team Left Back: 2018
- TV 2 Norway All-Star Team Left Back of the European Championship: 2018
- 2× World Cup Most Valuable Player: 2009, 2010
- 2× Carpathian Trophy Most Valuable Player: 2017, 2018
- 2× Carpathian Trophy Top Scorer: 2006, 2015
- 2× Bucharest Trophy All-Star Team Left Back: 2014, 2015
