= Wiedigsburghalle =

Indoor Stadium

- Interactive map of Wiedigsburghalle
- Full name: Wiedigsburghalle
- Location: Nordhausen, Thuringia, Germany
- Capacity: 2,018

Tenant
- Thüringer HC

Wiedigsburghalle in a multi-purpose indoor arena in Nordhausen, Thuringia, Germany. Its best known tenant is the women's handball club Thüringer HC, one of the top teams of the German championship, that also regularly plays in the EHF Champions League.
