= Ida Odén =

Swedish handball player (born 1987)

Personal information
- Full name: Ida Sofia Odén
- Nationality: Swedish
- Born: 14 April 1987 (age 39) Borås, Sweden
- Height: 1.72 m (5 ft 8 in)

Sport
- Sport: Handball
- Position: Right back
- Current club: IK Sävehof
- Number: 6

Senior clubs
- Years: Team
- –2005: Borås HK
- 2005–2018: IK Sävehof
National team
Years	Team	Apps	(Gls)
2012–2017	Sweden	54	(135)
Medal record
European Championship
Bronze medal – third place	2014 Croatia/Hungary

Ida Sofia Odén (born 14 April 1987) is a Swedish female former handballer. She played her entire senior career for IK Sävehof, and featured regularly in the Swedish national team. In 2014-15 she was named Swedish player of the year.

She won the Swedish Championship 11 times, including 7 times in a row from 2009 to 2015. She initially retired in 2015, but made a comeback for the finals of the 2016 season and would play on for 2 more seasons. When she won her 10th title in 2016, she broke the record for most Swedish Championships for a single player, taking the record from Ann-Britt Furugård and Eva Älgekrans, who both played for Stockholmspolisens IF in the 1970s and 80s. In the 2017-18 season, she scored the deciding goal in the final against H 65 Höör to win her 11th and final title.

Her first major international tournament was the 2014 European Women's Handball Championship at the age of 27. She won bronze medals at the occasion and was one of Sweden's best players. She also represented Sweden at the 2016 European Championship.

== Private ==
She is married to fellow handball player Robert Odén, who also played for IK Sävehof.

== Achievements ==
- Swedish Championship: (11)
  - Winner: 2006, 2007, 2009, 2010, 2011, 2012, 2013, 2014, 2015, 2016 and 2018 (record)
  - Silver Medalist: 2008
- Carpathian Trophy:
  - Winner: 2015
