= Anna Kochetova =

Russian handball player (born 1987)

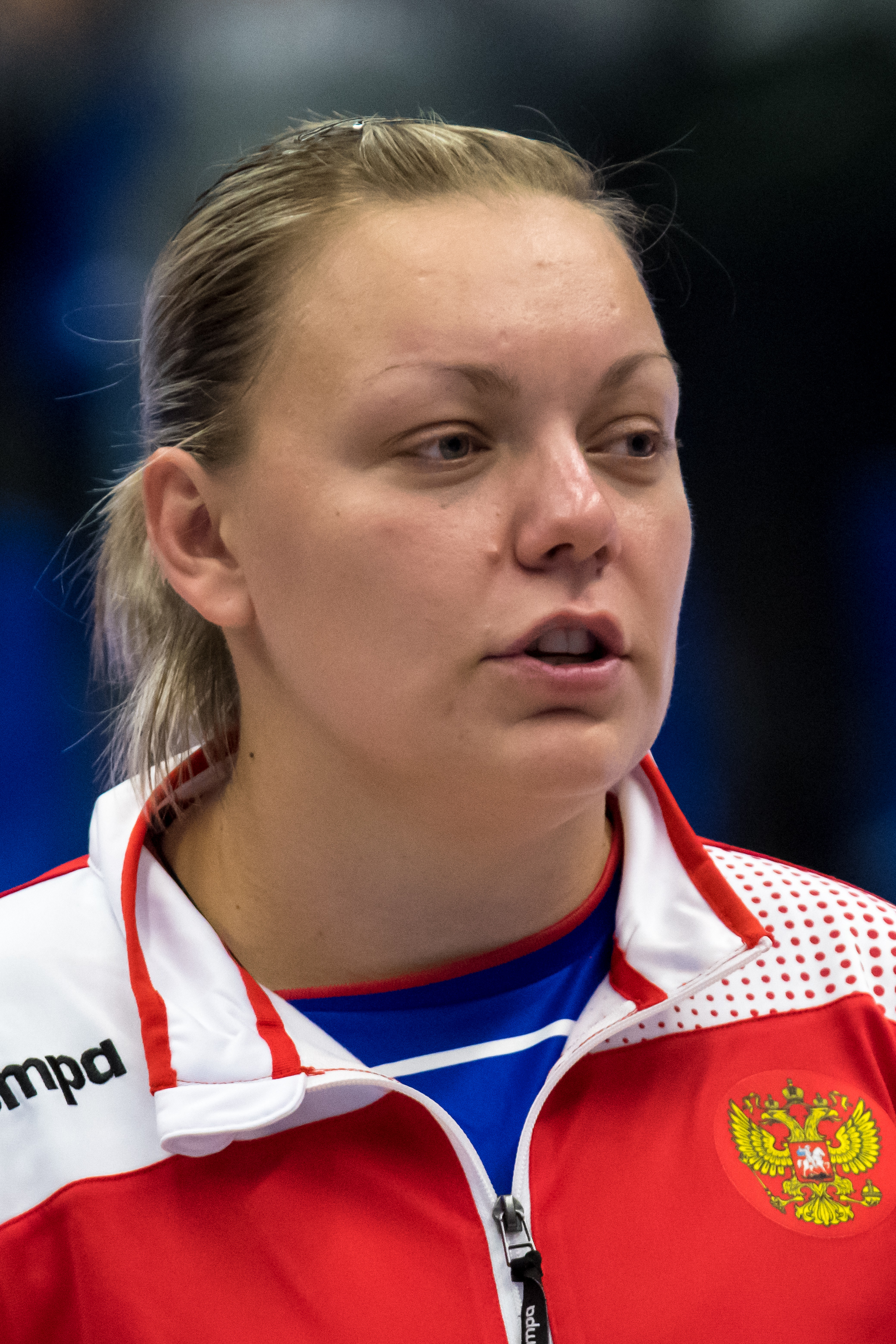

Personal information
- Full name: Anna Aleksandrovna Kochetova
- Nationality: Russian
- Born: 4 May 1987 (age 39) Volgograd, Russia
- Height: 1.78 m (5 ft 10 in)

Sport
- Sport: Handball
- Position: Left back
- Current club: HC Astrakhanochka
- Number: 6
National team
Years	Team	Apps	(Gls)
–	Russia	76	(219)
Medal record
European Championship
Silver medal – second place	2018 France

Anna Aleksandrovna Kochetova (Russian: Анна Александровна Кочетова; born 4 May 1987) is a Russian handball player for HC Astrakhanochka and the Russian national team.

At the 2009–10 EHF Women's Champions League Kochetova placed third on the list of top scorers.
