= 2016 European Women's Handball Championship squads =

The following is a list of squads for each nation competing at the 2016 European Women's Handball Championship.

On 25 October 2016 every coach had to submit a list of a maximum of 28 players, whom which 16 will be selected for the final tournament. Up to three replacements were granted during the tournament. The final squads were released on 3 and 4 December 2016.

Age, caps and goals are correct of the start of the tournament, 4 December 2016.

== Group A ==
=== Serbia ===
Head coach: Dragica Đurić

An 18-player squad was announced on 16 November 2016. The final squad was revealed on 2 December 2016.

No.	Pos.	Name	Date of birth (age)	Height	App.	Goals	Club
2	LW	Sanja Radosavljević	15 January 1994 (aged 22)	1.70 m	39	58	(Hungary) Váci NKSE
3	RW	Katarina Krpež Šlezak	9 May 1988 (aged 28)	1.68 m	120	314	(Hungary) Érdi VSE
5	LB	Jelena Trifunović	4 August 1991 (aged 25)	1.82 m	59	84	(Romania) S.C.M. Craiova
9	RB	Jelena Živković	6 July 1991 (aged 25)	1.84 m	83	167	(Hungary) Fehérvár KC
10	LB	Jovana Kovačević	9 April 1996 (aged 20)	1.78 m	11	2	(Hungary) Békéscsabai Előre NKSE
15	RB	Anđela Janjušević	18 June 1995 (aged 21)	1.78 m	14	2	(Hungary) Siófok KC
16	GK	Jovana Risović	3 October 1993 (aged 23)	1.71 m	72	2	(Denmark) Randers HK
18	CB	Tamara Georgijev	6 September 1992 (aged 24)	1.72 m	30	46	(Slovenia) RK Krim
20	P	Slađana Pop-Lazić	29 July 1988 (aged 28)	1.78 m	75	146	(France) Metz Handball
23	LB	Marija Obradović	6 August 1992 (aged 24)	1.82 m	7	13	(Germany) TuS Metzingen
27	GK	Nina Kolundžić	29 January 1990 (aged 26)	1.86 m	15	0	(Austria) HIB Handball Graz
30	RW	Željka Nikolić	12 July 1991 (aged 25)	1.68 m	11	15	(Romania) S.C.M. Craiova
33	LB	Jovana Stoiljković	30 September 1988 (aged 28)	1.82 m	72	139	(France) Nantes Handball
71	CB	Kristina Liščević	20 October 1989 (aged 27)	1.73 m	77	121	(Russia) HC Kuban Krasnodar
83	P	Marija Petrović	18 March 1994 (aged 22)	1.85 m	26	17	(Serbia) ŽRK Izvor
90	GK	Marija Čolić	12 April 1990 (aged 26)	1.73 m	10	1	(France) Nice Handball
99	RB	Marina Dmitrović	23 March 1985 (aged 31)	1.85 m	85	153	(Hungary) Kisvárdai KC

=== Slovenia ===
An 18-player squad was announced on 10 November 2016. The final squad was revealed on 1 December 2016.

Head coach: Uroš Bregar

No.	Pos.	Name	Date of birth (age)	Height	App.	Goals	Club
3	LB	Teja Ferfolja	20 September 1991 (aged 25)	1.83 m	20	9	(Switzerland) DHB Rotweiss Thun
6	RB	Ana Gros	21 January 1991 (aged 25)	1.86 m	66	274	(France) Metz Handball
7	RB	Janja Rebolj	29 January 1993 (aged 23)	1.73 m	6	8	(Slovenia) RK Zagorje
8	LB	Lea Krajnc	1 April 1993 (aged 23)	1.76 m	8	9	(Turkey) Zağnos SK
9	CB	Nina Jeriček	10 April 1984 (aged 32)	1.72 m	46	106	(Slovenia) RK Krim
10	CB	Tjaša Stanko	5 November 1997 (aged 19)	1.73 m	18	34	(Slovenia) RK Zagorje
11	P	Katja Čerenjak	6 September 1983 (aged 33)	1.75 m	50	58	(Slovenia) Zelene doline Žalec
12	GK	Sergeja Stefanišin	19 September 1974 (aged 42)	1.84 m	207	0	(Slovenia) RK Krim
13	P	Valentina Panger	14 January 1991 (aged 25)	1.68 m	6	4	(Slovenia) RK Zagorje
14	LW	Tamara Mavsar	1 April 1991 (aged 25)	1.73 m	45	110	(North Macedonia) HC Vardar
15	RB	Barbara Lazović	4 January 1988 (aged 28)	1.82 m	57	188	(North Macedonia) HC Vardar
16	GK	Miša Marinček	18 February 1985 (aged 31)	1.87 m	84	0	(Slovenia) RK Krim
18	CB	Nina Zulič	4 December 1995 (aged 21)	1.70 m	0	0	(Slovenia) Mlinotest Ajdovščina
19	RW	Neli Irman	7 April 1986 (aged 30)	1.73 m	84	215	(Montenegro) ŽRK Budućnost Podgorica
32	LB	Lina Krhlikar	29 June 1989 (aged 27)	1.84 m	37	78	(Germany) Frisch Auf Göppingen
77	LB	Maja Užmah	23 February 1988 (aged 28)	1.82 m	43	143	(France) HBC Celles-sur-Belle

=== Spain ===
An 18-player squad was announced on 11 November 2016. The final squad was revealed on 28 November 2016.

Head coach: Jorge Dueñas

No.	Pos.	Name	Date of birth (age)	Height	App.	Goals	Club
2	RW	Marta López	4 February 1990 (aged 26)	1.68 m	91	279	(Spain) Bera Bera
4	RW	Carmen Martín	29 May 1988 (aged 28)	1.72 m	182	604	(Romania) CSM București
6	LB	Nely Carla Alberto	2 July 1983 (aged 33)	1.79 m	126	335	(France) Chambray Touraine Handball
9	RB	Marta Mangué	23 April 1983 (aged 33)	1.70 m	293	1019	(France) Brest Bretagne Handball
10	CB	Macarena Aguilar	12 March 1985 (aged 31)	1.70 m	226	607	(Germany) Thüringer HC
12	GK	Silvia Navarro	20 March 1979 (aged 37)	1.69 m	150	3	(Spain) Gran Canaria
14	P	Elisabeth Chávez	17 November 1990 (aged 26)	1.92 m	162	113	(France) Fleury Loiret HB
20	LW	Amaia González	27 February 1994 (aged 22)	1.67 m	9	4	(Spain) Balonmano Aula Valladolid
25	LB	Nerea Pena	13 December 1989 (aged 26)	1.75 m	109	335	(Hungary) FTC-Rail Cargo Hungaria
27	LB	Lara González Ortega	22 February 1992 (aged 24)	1.84 m	62	59	(Denmark) Team Esbjerg
30	RB	Patricia Elorza	4 April 1984 (aged 32)	1.80 m	121	75	(Spain) Bera Bera
32	RB	Mireya González	18 July 1991 (aged 25)	1.78 m	21	24	(Hungary) Érdi VSE
35	LW	Naiara Egozkue	21 October 1983 (aged 33)	1.73 m	65	83	(Spain) Zuazo Barakaldo
44	P	Ainhoa Hernández	27 April 1994 (aged 22)	1.80 m	31	26	(Spain) Zuazo Barakaldo
48	GK	Darly de Paula	25 August 1982 (aged 34)	1.78 m	31	0	(Montenegro) ŽRK Budućnost Podgorica
49	P	Judith Sans	31 March 1994 (aged 22)	1.75 m	4	4	(Spain) Bera Bera
86	LB	Alexandrina Barbosa	5 May 1986 (aged 30)	1.75 m	76	361	(Russia) Rostov-Don

=== Sweden ===
The squad was announced on 1 November 2016. On 13 December 2016, Marie Wall replaced Olivia Mellegård because of an injury.

Head coach: Henrik Signell

No.	Pos.	Name	Date of birth (age)	Height	App.	Goals	Club
1	GK	Johanna Bundsen	3 June 1991 (aged 25)	1.85 m	45	0	(Sweden) IK Sävehof
4	LW	Olivia Mellegård	17 June 1996 (aged 20)	1.78 m	4	13	(Sweden) IK Sävehof
5	RW	Emma Ekenman-Fernis	24 July 1996 (aged 20)	1.72 m	3	3	(Sweden) IK Sävehof
6	CB	Carin Strömberg	10 July 1993 (aged 23)	1.84 m	27	21	(Denmark) Viborg HK
7	P	Linn Blohm	20 May 1992 (aged 24)	1.80 m	65	162	(Denmark) FC Midtjylland
8	LB	Jamina Roberts	28 May 1990 (aged 26)	1.76 m	111	194	(Sweden) IK Sävehof
9	LW	Louise Sand	27 December 1992 (aged 23)	1.64 m	69	138	(Sweden) IK Sävehof
12	GK	Filippa Idéhn	15 August 1990 (aged 26)	1.83 m	68	2	(Denmark) Team Esbjerg
14	LB	Johanna Westberg	6 April 1990 (aged 26)	1.86 m	33	45	(Denmark) Nykøbing Falster
18	LW	Marie Wall	3 April 1992 (aged 24)	1.77 m	14	16	(Sweden) H 65 Höör
19	P	Anna Lagerquist	16 October 1993 (aged 23)	1.73 m	3	1	(Sweden) Lugi HF
20	CB	Isabelle Gulldén	29 June 1989 (aged 27)	1.77 m	164	630	(Romania) CSM București
22	RW	Hanna Blomstrand	25 August 1996 (aged 20)	1.73 m	8	5	(Sweden) Lugi HF
24	RB	Nathalie Hagman	19 July 1991 (aged 25)	1.67 m	97	252	(Denmark) Nykøbing Falster
27	RB	Sabina Jacobsen	24 March 1989 (aged 27)	1.80 m	92	128	(Denmark) FC Midtjylland
28	RB	Ida Odén	14 April 1987 (aged 29)	1.72 m	45	122	(Sweden) IK Sävehof
29	LB	Jenny Alm	10 April 1989 (aged 27)	1.84 m	83	212	(Denmark) Team Esbjerg

== Group B ==
=== France ===
A 19-player squad was announced on 8 November 2016. The final squad was revealed on 29 November 2016.

Head coach: Olivier Krumbholz

No.	Pos.	Name	Date of birth (age)	Height	App.	Goals	Club
1	GK	Laura Glauser	20 August 1993 (aged 23)	1.78 m	51	0	(France) Metz Handball
3	RW	Amanda Kolczynski	10 August 1993 (aged 23)	1.70 m	6	6	(France) ESBF Besançon
5	RB	Camille Ayglon	21 May 1985 (aged 31)	1.80 m	221	396	(Romania) CSM București
7	CB	Allison Pineau	2 May 1989 (aged 27)	1.81 m	193	515	(France) Brest Bretagne Handball
8	P	Laurisa Landre	27 October 1985 (aged 31)	1.74 m	52	86	(Romania) S.C.M. Craiova
10	CB	Grâce Zaadi	7 July 1993 (aged 23)	1.71 m	62	75	(France) Metz Handball
12	GK	Amandine Leynaud	2 May 1988 (aged 28)	1.78 m	188	2	(North Macedonia) HC Vardar
13	LW	Manon Houette	2 July 1992 (aged 24)	1.68 m	40	67	(Germany) Thüringer HC
17	LW	Siraba Dembélé	28 June 1986 (aged 30)	1.72 m	225	720	(Russia) Rostov-Don
20	RB	Laura Flippes	13 December 1994 (aged 21)	1.71 m	6	3	(France) Metz Handball
22	CB	Tamara Horacek	5 November 1995 (aged 21)	1.78 m	9	5	(France) Metz Handball
24	P	Béatrice Edwige	3 October 1988 (aged 28)	1.82 m	42	23	(France) Metz Handball
27	CB	Estelle Nze Minko	11 August 1991 (aged 25)	1.78 m	52	90	(Hungary) Siófok KC
28	RB	Marie-Paule Gnabouyou	4 March 1988 (aged 28)	1.85 m	78	104	(Denmark) Viborg HK
29	LB	Gnonsiane Niombla	9 July 1990 (aged 26)	1.72 m	61	169	(Romania) CSM București
64	RB	Alexandra Lacrabère	27 April 1987 (aged 29)	1.77 m	184	600	(North Macedonia) HC Vardar

=== Germany ===
An 18-player squad was announced on 3 November 2016. A 21-player squad was revealed on 16 November 2016. The final squad was announced on 1 December 2016.

Head coach: Michael Biegler

No.	Pos.	Name	Date of birth (age)	Height	App.	Goals	Club
3	RB	Isabell Klein	28 June 1984 (aged 32)	1.72 m	76	93	(France) Nantes Handball
5	LW/LB	Saskia Lang	19 December 1986 (aged 29)	1.78 m	70	71	(Germany) HC Leipzig
6	P	Jenny Karolius	24 May 1986 (aged 30)	1.81 m	6	8	(Germany) Bayer Leverkusen
7	P	Meike Schmelzer	19 July 1993 (aged 23)	1.78 m	19	13	(Germany) Thüringer HC
10	CB	Anna Loerper	18 November 1984 (aged 32)	1.64 m	221	382	(Germany) TuS Metzingen
12	GK	Katja Kramarczyk	18 March 1984 (aged 32)	1.78 m	122	0	(Germany) HC Leipzig
13	P	Julia Behnke	28 March 1993 (aged 23)	1.80 m	25	23	(Germany) TuS Metzingen
14	RW	Stella Kramer	22 March 1989 (aged 27)	1.65 m	7	11	(Germany) Borussia Dortmund
15	CB	Kim Naidzinavicius	6 April 1991 (aged 25)	1.81 m	73	150	(Germany) SG BBM Bietigheim
16	GK	Clara Woltering	2 March 1983 (aged 33)	1.78 m	203	0	(Germany) Borussia Dortmund
17	RB	Anne Hubinger	31 July 1993 (aged 23)	1.85 m	51	69	(Germany) HC Leipzig
19	LB	Emily Bölk	26 April 1998 (aged 18)	1.84 m	5	13	(Germany) Buxtehuder SV
23	RW	Svenja Huber	23 October 1985 (aged 31)	1.68 m	33	102	(Germany) Borussia Dortmund
24	LW	Lone Fischer	8 September 1988 (aged 28)	1.65 m	27	59	(Germany) Buxtehuder SV
31	LW	Kerstin Wohlbold	11 January 1984 (aged 32)	1.70 m	62	116	(Germany) Thüringer HC
36	GK	Dinah Eckerle	16 October 1995 (aged 21)	1.70 m	7	0	(Germany) Thüringer HC
37	RB	Alicia Stolle	17 June 1996 (aged 20)	1.79 m	4	5	(Germany) HSG Blomberg-Lippe

=== Netherlands ===
A 17-player squad was announced on 4 November 2016. The final squad was revealed on 26 November 2016.

Head coach: Helle Thomsen

No.	Pos.	Name	Date of birth (age)	Height	App.	Goals	Club
5	LB	Jessy Kramer	16 February 1990 (aged 26)	1.77 m	97	83	(France) Toulon Handball
6	RB	Laura van der Heijden	27 June 1990 (aged 26)	1.72 m	161	520	(Denmark) Team Esbjerg
7	RW	Debbie Bont	9 December 1990 (aged 25)	1.74 m	117	224	(Denmark) København Håndbold
8	LB	Lois Abbingh	13 August 1992 (aged 24)	1.77 m	105	449	(France) Issy-Paris Hand
9	RB	Sanne van Olphen	13 March 1989 (aged 27)	1.77 m	78	128	(France) Toulon Handball
10	P	Danick Snelder	22 May 1990 (aged 26)	1.78 m	133	320	(Hungary) FTC-Rail Cargo Hungaria
11	CB	Lynn Knippenborg	7 January 1992 (aged 24)	1.75 m	65	97	(Germany) Buxtehuder SV
13	P	Yvette Broch	23 December 1990 (aged 25)	1.85 m	95	225	(Hungary) Győri ETO
15	CB	Maura Visser	1 June 1985 (aged 31)	1.78 m	122	433	(Germany) SG BBM Bietigheim
17	CB	Nycke Groot	4 May 1988 (aged 28)	1.75 m	107	325	(Hungary) Győri ETO
18	LB	Kelly Dulfer	21 March 1994 (aged 22)	1.86 m	62	43	(Germany) VfL Oldenburg
21	LW	Michelle Goos	27 December 1989 (aged 26)	1.78 m	71	121	(Germany) Buxtehuder SV
23	GK	Jasmina Janković	6 December 1986 (aged 29)	1.68 m	69	1	(Germany) TuS Metzingen
26	RW	Angela Malestein	31 January 1993 (aged 23)	1.73 m	98	191	(Germany) SG BBM Bietigheim
33	GK	Tess Wester	19 May 1993 (aged 23)	1.78 m	56	6	(Germany) SG BBM Bietigheim
79	LB	Estavana Polman	5 August 1992 (aged 24)	1.74 m	100	340	(Denmark) Team Esbjerg

=== Poland ===
A 17-player squad was announced on 6 November 2016. The final squad was revealed on 28 November 2016.

Head coach: Leszek Krowicki

No.	Pos.	Name	Date of birth (age)	Height	App.	Goals	Club
3	RB	Monika Kobylińska	9 April 1995 (aged 21)	1.77 m	26	85	(Poland) Vistal Gdynia
8	LB	Marta Gęga	16 April 1986 (aged 30)	1.84 m	43	61	(Poland) MKS Lublin
9	LW	Agnieszka Kocela	17 January 1988 (aged 28)	1.70 m	50	105	(Poland) MKS Lublin
10	RW	Patrycja Królikowska	15 May 1992 (aged 24)	1.60 m	13	16	(Poland) Vistal Gdynia
11	LW	Kinga Grzyb	12 January 1982 (aged 34)	1.68 m	218	539	(Poland) MKS Zagłębie Lubin
12	GK	Weronika Gawlik	20 October 1986 (aged 30)	1.80 m	56	0	(Poland) MKS Lublin
15	RW	Katarzyna Janiszewska	26 October 1995 (aged 21)	1.68 m	25	28	(Poland) Vistal Gdynia
16	GK	Adrianna Płaczek	10 December 1993 (aged 22)	1.74 m	5	0	(Poland) Pogoń Szczecin
20	P	Joanna Drabik	28 October 1993 (aged 23)	1.80 m	36	33	(Poland) MKS Lublin
24	LB	Joanna Kozłowska	19 January 1995 (aged 21)	1.84 m	3	2	(Poland) Vistal Gdynia
26	CB	Emilia Galińska	26 December 1992 (aged 23)	1.75 m	7	2	(Germany) Neckarsulmer SU
28	LB	Alina Wojtas	21 March 1987 (aged 29)	1.91 m	80	241	(Norway) Larvik HK
29	RB	Natalia Nosek	20 April 1998 (aged 18)	1.78 m	5	4	(Poland) MOSiR Bochnia
34	P	Kamila Szczecina	31 October 1987 (aged 29)	1.74 m	5	11	(Poland) Pogoń Szczecin
89	CB	Kinga Achruk	9 January 1989 (aged 27)	1.81 m	143	355	(Montenegro) ŽRK Budućnost Podgorica
92	RB	Ewa Andrzejewska	18 January 1992 (aged 24)	1.82 m	12	13	(Poland) Kram Start Elblag

== Group C ==
=== Czech Republic ===
A 19-player squad was announced on 7 November 2016. The squad was reduced to 18 players on 28 November 2016. The final squad was revealed on 2 December 2016.

Head coach: Jan Bašný

No.	Pos.	Name	Date of birth (age)	Height	App.	Goals	Club
3	RW	Jana Knedlíková	22 June 1989 (aged 27)	1.67 m	81	175	(Hungary) Győri ETO
7	RB	Helena Ryšánková	19 November 1992 (aged 24)	1.75 m	12	13	(France) Stella Saint-Maur Handball
9	LW	Kristýna Salčáková	13 August 1987 (aged 29)	1.63 m	103	153	(France) Achenheim Truchtersheim
10	CB	Petra Růčková	8 February 1989 (aged 27)	1.73 m	101	79	(Czech Republic) DHK Banik Most
14	LB	Kamila Kordovská	4 December 1997 (aged 19)	1.79 m	11	37	(Czech Republic) DHC Slavia Prague
15	RB	Michaela Hrbková	14 July 1987 (aged 29)	1.70 m	119	258	(Germany) Frisch Auf Göppingen
16	GK	Lucie Satrapová	3 July 1989 (aged 27)	1.83 m	75	0	(Sweden) Kristianstad Handboll
18	CB	Iveta Luzumová	3 April 1989 (aged 27)	1.76 m	75	292	(Germany) Thüringer HC
22	RB	Martina Crhová	17 June 1988 (aged 28)	1.76 m	57	78	(Sweden) Kristianstad Handboll
27	P	Petra Adámková	21 June 1991 (aged 25)	1.70 m	34	41	(Germany) Frisch Auf Göppingen
28	CB	Šárka Marčíková	12 March 1992 (aged 24)	1.76 m	21	22	(Czech Republic) DHC Sokol Poruba
30	GK	Dominika Müllnerová	26 March 1992 (aged 24)	1.70 m	38	1	(Czech Republic) DHK Banik Most
31	P	Alena Stellnerová	22 August 1989 (aged 27)	1.70 m	22	21	(Czech Republic) DHC Slavia Prague
33	GK	Petra Kudláčková	17 October 1994 (aged 22)	1.73 m	2	0	(Czech Republic) DHC Slavia Prague
36	LB	Martina Weisenbilderová	13 April 1992 (aged 24)	1.81 m	10	5	(Sweden) Kristianstad Handboll
51	LB	Markéta Jeřábková	8 February 1996 (aged 20)	1.74 m	21	63	(Czech Republic) DHK Banik Most
67	LW	Veronika Malá	6 May 1994 (aged 22)	1.70 m	22	64	(Germany) VfL Oldenburg

=== Denmark ===
The squad was announced on 9 November 2016.

Head coach: Klavs Bruun Jørgensen

No.	Pos.	Name	Date of birth (age)	Height	App.	Goals	Club
1	GK	Sandra Toft Galsgaard	18 October 1989 (aged 27)	1.76 m	74	0	(Norway) Larvik HK
4	LB	Anna Sophie Okkels	23 March 1990 (aged 26)	1.78 m	32	48	(Denmark) SK Aarhus
7	LW	Maria Fisker	3 October 1990 (aged 26)	1.70 m	77	197	(Denmark) Randers HK
8	LB	Anne Mette Hansen	25 August 1994 (aged 22)	1.84 m	52	115	(Denmark) København Håndbold
9	LW	Fie Woller	17 September 1992 (aged 24)	1.75 m	21	30	(Denmark) FC Midtjylland
10	P	Kathrine Heindahl	26 March 1992 (aged 24)	1.84 m	19	29	(Denmark) Randers HK
14	CB	Lotte Grigel	5 April 1991 (aged 25)	1.65 m	63	106	(Russia) Rostov-Don
17	P	Stine Bodholt Nielsen	8 November 1989 (aged 27)	1.76 m	29	39	(Denmark) Viborg HK
18	RB	Mette Tranborg	1 January 1996 (aged 20)	1.92 m	20	44	(Denmark) SK Aarhus
21	CB	Kristina Kristiansen	13 July 1989 (aged 27)	1.63 m	138	374	(Denmark) Nykøbing Falster
22	RB	Anne Cecilie de la Cour	8 December 1993 (aged 22)	1.80 m	14	19	(Denmark) København Håndbold
25	RW	Trine Østergaard	17 October 1991 (aged 25)	1.65 m	69	102	(Denmark) FC Midtjylland
26	P	Louise Svalastog Spellerberg	1 October 1982 (aged 34)	1.78 m	67	79	(Denmark) København Håndbold
28	CB	Stine Jørgensen	3 September 1990 (aged 26)	1.80 m	101	290	(Denmark) FC Midtjylland
31	LB	Line Haugsted	11 November 1994 (aged 22)	1.77 m	10	10	(Denmark) Viborg HK
40	GK	Althea Reinhardt	1 September 1996 (aged 20)	1.80 m	5	0	(Denmark) HC Odense

=== Hungary ===
A 22-player squad was announced on 14 November 2016. It was reduced to 21 players on 20 November 2016, to 18 players on 24 November 2016, and to 17 players on 30 November 2016.

Head coach: Kim Rasmussen

No.	Pos.	Name	Date of birth (age)	Height	App.	Goals	Club
3	LW	Nadine Schatzl	19 November 1993 (aged 23)	1.73 m	13	25	(Hungary) FTC-Rail Cargo Hungaria
5	LB	Krisztina Triscsuk	17 July 1985 (aged 31)	1.76 m	47	132	(Hungary) Siófok KC
12	GK	Melinda Szikora	19 November 1988 (aged 28)	1.75 m	1	0	(Hungary) FTC-Rail Cargo Hungaria
13	CB	Anita Görbicz	13 May 1983 (aged 33)	1.73 m	213	1029	(Hungary) Győri ETO
14	P	Anett Kisfaludy	31 August 1990 (aged 26)	1.82 m	9	9	(Hungary) Érdi VSE
15	LB	Kinga Klivinyi	31 March 1992 (aged 24)	1.78 m	33	65	(Hungary) Érdi VSE
21	GK	Éva Kiss	10 July 1987 (aged 29)	1.89 m	69	1	(Hungary) Győri ETO
22	RW	Bernadett Bódi	9 March 1986 (aged 30)	1.75 m	120	208	(Hungary) Győri ETO
23	LB	Klára Szekeres	1 December 1987 (aged 29)	1.83 m	71	25	(Hungary) FTC-Rail Cargo Hungaria
25	RB	Anna Kovács	24 October 1991 (aged 25)	1.73 m	11	22	(Hungary) Dunaújvárosi
30	RB	Szimonetta Planéta	12 December 1993 (aged 22)	1.98 m	38	41	(Germany) Thüringer HC
31	RB	Dóra Hornyák	24 January 1992 (aged 24)	1.76 m	13	16	(Hungary) FTC-Rail Cargo Hungaria
34	P	Rea Mészáros	14 April 1994 (aged 22)	1.72 m	23	5	(Hungary) FTC-Rail Cargo Hungaria
44	LW	Ildikó Erdősi	14 September 1989 (aged 27)	1.71 m	31	67	(Hungary) Siófok KC
61	GK	Kinga Janurik	6 November 1991 (aged 25)	1.76 m	7	1	(Hungary) Érdi VSE
66	RW	Viktória Lukács	31 January 1995 (aged 21)	1.69 m	6	14	(Hungary) FTC-Rail Cargo Hungaria
99	P	Luca Dombi	17 November 1995 (aged 21)	1.67 m	2	3	(Hungary) Mosonmagyaróvár

=== Montenegro ===
A 20-player squad was announced on 14 November 2016. It was reduced to 17 on 30 November 2016.

Head coach: Dragan Adžić

No.	Pos.	Name	Date of birth (age)	Height	App.	Goals	Club
1	GK	Marina Rajčić	24 August 1993 (aged 23)	1.78 m	95	0	(France) Metz Handball
9	LB	Đurđina Jauković	24 February 1997 (aged 19)	1.85 m	36	76	(Montenegro) Budućnost
12	GK	Ljubica Nenezić	15 January 1997 (aged 19)	1.79 m	4	0	(Montenegro) Budućnost
15	RB	Andrea Klikovac	5 May 1991 (aged 25)	1.74 m	55	20	(North Macedonia) Vardar
20	RB	Jasna Tošković	16 March 1989 (aged 27)	1.88 m	24	18	(Romania) CSM Roman
23	RW	Dijana Ujkić	5 July 1996 (aged 20)	1.72 m	3	1	(Montenegro) Budućnost
25	RB	Đurđina Malović	5 May 1996 (aged 20)	1.82 m	13	11	(Montenegro) Budućnost
26	P	Suzana Lazović	28 January 1992 (aged 24)	1.76 m	97	111	(Montenegro) Budućnost
27	RB	Sanja Premović	27 November 1992 (aged 24)	1.72 m	4	1	(Poland) Zaglebie Lubin
55	LW	Ivona Pavićević	21 April 1996 (aged 20)	1.67 m	17	7	(Montenegro) Budućnost
66	P	Ema Ramusović	28 November 1996 (aged 20)	1.82 m	34	22	(Montenegro) Budućnost
71	P	Bobana Klikovac	19 July 1995 (aged 21)	1.81 m	8	6	(Hungary) Debrecen
77	LW	Majda Mehmedović	25 May 1990 (aged 26)	1.69 m	100	228	(Romania) CSM București
80	CB	Jelena Despotović	30 April 1994 (aged 22)	1.83 m	47	34	(Hungary) Debrecen
90	LB	Milena Knežević	12 March 1990 (aged 26)	1.78 m	127	356	(Montenegro) Budućnost
96	LW	Itana Grbić	1 September 1996 (aged 20)	1.69 m	16	8	(Montenegro) Budućnost

== Group D ==
=== Croatia ===
An 18-player squad was announced on 14 November 2016. The final squad was revealed on 3 December 2016.

Head coach: Goran Mrđen

No.	Pos.	Name	Date of birth (age)	Height	App.	Goals	Club
1	GK	Marina Razum	25 February 1992 (aged 24)	1.80 m	18	0	(Croatia) RK Zagreb
2	RW	Nikolina Zadravec	9 February 1997 (aged 19)	1.68 m	8	11	(Croatia) RK Podravka
3	LW	Ekatarina Nemaškalo	31 July 1989 (aged 27)	1.67 m	26	42	(Croatia) RK Podravka
4	CB	Valentina Blažević	14 February 1994 (aged 22)	1.70 m	9	3	(Slovenia) RK Krim
5	P	Ana Debelić	9 January 1994 (aged 22)	1.83 m	7	9	(Croatia) RK Podravka
6	P	Andrea Čović	9 October 1993 (aged 23)	1.75 m	22	19	(North Macedonia) HC Vardar
7	LW	Paula Posavec	26 August 1996 (aged 20)	1.70 m	11	7	(Croatia) ŽRK Zrinski
9	LB	Ćamila Mičijević	8 September 1994 (aged 22)	1.94 m	22	47	(Hungary) Dunaújvárosi
10	CB	Dora Krsnik	19 January 1992 (aged 24)	1.70 m	8	9	(Croatia) RK Podravka
14	LB	Marijeta Vidak	14 August 1992 (aged 24)	1.79 m	11	6	(Croatia) RK Podravka
15	LB	Andrea Penezić	13 November 1985 (aged 31)	1.86 m	141	733	(North Macedonia) HC Vardar
16	GK	Gabrijela Bešen	6 December 1994 (aged 21)	1.79 m	14	1	(Croatia) RK Sesvete Agroproteinka
20	P	Vesna Milanović-Litre	30 May 1986 (aged 30)	1.80 m	104	196	(Slovenia) RK Krim
23	RW	Nataša Janković	27 August 1991 (aged 25)	1.70 m	23	19	(Turkey) Ardeşen GSK
26	RB	Žana Čović	20 August 1989 (aged 27)	1.80 m	41	45	(Poland) Zaglebie Lubin
29	CB	Sonja Bašić	26 November 1987 (aged 29)	1.82 m	65	131	(Hungary) Váci NKSE

=== Norway ===
The squad was announced on 8 November 2016.

Head coach: Thorir Hergeirsson

No.	Pos.	Name	Date of birth (age)	Height	App.	Goals	Club
1	GK	Kari Aalvik Grimsbø	4 January 1985 (aged 31)	1.80 m	148	0	(Hungary) Győri ETO
3	LB	Emilie Hegh Arntzen	1 January 1994 (aged 22)	1.83 m	45	44	(Norway) Byåsen HE
4	LB	Veronica Kristiansen	10 July 1990 (aged 26)	1.75 m	84	252	(Denmark) FC Midtjylland
7	RB	Stine Skogrand	3 March 1993 (aged 23)	1.73 m	38	65	(Denmark) Silkeborg/Voel KFUM
8	P	Vilde Ingstad	18 December 1994 (aged 21)	1.78 m	26	23	(Denmark) Team Esbjerg
9	RB	Nora Mørk	5 April 1991 (aged 25)	1.69 m	87	398	(Hungary) Győri ETO
10	CB	Stine Bredal Oftedal	25 September 1991 (aged 25)	1.68 m	126	273	(France) Issy-Paris Hand
11	RW	Malin Aune	4 March 1995 (aged 21)	1.65 m	14	13	(Norway) Oppsal
12	GK	Silje Solberg	16 June 1990 (aged 26)	1.78 m	94	0	(France) Issy-Paris Hand
13	P	Marit Malm Frafjord	25 November 1985 (aged 31)	1.82 m	189	379	(Norway) Larvik HK
15	RB	Silje Waade	20 March 1994 (aged 22)	1.83 m	6	9	(Norway) Byåsen HE
19	LB	Kjerstin Boge Solås	31 December 1997 (aged 18)	1.82 m	6	3	(Norway) Tertnes HE
22	RW	Amanda Kurtović	25 July 1991 (aged 25)	1.75 m	84	215	(Norway) Larvik HK
23	LW	Camilla Herrem	8 October 1986 (aged 30)	1.67 m	198	531	(North Macedonia) HC Vardar
24	LW	Sanna Solberg	16 June 1990 (aged 26)	1.78 m	87	151	(Norway) Larvik HK
26	CB	Marta Tomac	20 September 1990 (aged 26)	1.79 m	25	29	(Norway) Vipers Kristiansand

=== Romania ===
A 23-player squad was selected. It was trimmed to 18 on 28 November 2016.

Head coach: Ambros Martín

No.	Pos.	Name	Date of birth (age)	Height	App.	Goals	Club
2	RW	Aneta Pîrvuț	22 June 1989 (aged 27)	1.64 m	12	17	(Romania) Dunărea Brăila
3	LB	Gabriella Szűcs	31 August 1984 (aged 32)	1.79 m	21	10	(Romania) Dunărea Brăila
5	RB	Melinda Geiger	28 March 1987 (aged 29)	1.77 m	84	219	(France) Brest Bretagne Handball
6	P	Crina Pintea	3 April 1990 (aged 26)	1.86 m	27	38	(Germany) Thuringer HC
7	LB	Eliza Buceschi	31 August 1993 (aged 23)	1.75 m	45	110	(Romania) Dunărea Brăila
8	LB	Cristina Neagu	26 August 1988 (aged 28)	1.80 m	149	649	(Montenegro) ŽRK Budućnost Podgorica
10	LW	Elena Florică	11 May 1992 (aged 24)	1.74 m	10	21	(Romania) HCM Râmnicu Vâlcea
13	CB	Cristina Laslo	10 April 1996 (aged 20)	1.76 m	0	0	(Romania) Universitatea Cluj-Napoca
14	LW	Ana Maria Iuganu	25 February 1990 (aged 26)	1.75 m	3	5	(Romania) CSM Roman
16	GK	Denisa Dedu	27 September 1994 (aged 22)	1.82 m	20	2	(Romania) Corona Brașov
17	RB	Laura Popa	29 June 1994 (aged 22)	1.81 m	7	21	(Romania) Universitatea Cluj-Napoca
19	LB	Cristina Zamfir	29 September 1989 (aged 27)	1.83 m	8	17	(Romania) S.C.M. Craiova
20	GK	Yuliya Dumanska	15 August 1996 (aged 20)	1.78 m	1	0	(Romania) S.C.M. Craiova
22	P	Oana Manea	18 April 1985 (aged 31)	1.75 m	193	433	(Romania) CSM București
30	GK	Paula Ungureanu	30 March 1980 (aged 36)	1.80 m	163	2	(Romania) CSM București
31	CB	Mădălina Zamfirescu	31 October 1994 (aged 22)	1.77 m	7	15	(Romania) Dunărea Brăila
85	P	Florina Chintoan	6 December 1985 (aged 30)	1.78 m	111	151	(Romania) Universitatea Cluj-Napoca
89	RW	Laura Chiper	21 August 1989 (aged 27)	1.73 m	34	52	(Romania) Corona Brașov

=== Russia ===
A 21-player squad was announced on 16 November 2016. It was reduced to 18 players on 3 December 2016.

Head coach: Yevgeni Trefilov

No.	Pos.	Name	Date of birth (age)	Height	App.	Goals	Club
4	P	Yana Zhilinskayte	6 March 1989 (aged 27)	1.85 m	29	27	(Russia) HC Kuban Krasnodar
5	LB	Lyudmila Postnova	11 August 1984 (aged 32)	1.83 m	206	712	(Russia) HC Astrakhanochka
7	CB	Daria Dmitrieva	9 August 1995 (aged 21)	1.78 m	56	134	(Russia) Lada Togliatti
8	RB	Anna Sen	3 February 1990 (aged 26)	1.85 m	108	248	(Russia) Rostov-Don
13	RW	Anna Vyakhireva	13 March 1995 (aged 21)	1.65 m	52	196	(Russia) Rostov-Don
15	RW	Marina Sudakova	17 February 1989 (aged 27)	1.66 m	69	114	(Russia) HC Kuban Krasnodar
17	LB	Vladlena Bobrovnikova	24 October 1987 (aged 29)	1.80 m	51	117	(Russia) Rostov-Don
18	LW	Daria Samokhina	12 August 1992 (aged 24)	1.75 m	3	3	(Russia) Lada Togliatti
19	P	Ksenia Makeeva	19 September 1990 (aged 26)	1.85 m	90	168	(Russia) Rostov-Don
21	LB	Victoria Zhilinskayte	6 March 1989 (aged 27)	1.88 m	125	181	(Russia) HC Kuban Krasnodar
29	GK	Elena Utkina	29 May 1990 (aged 26)	1.81 m	4	1	(Russia) Lada Togliatti
31	CB	Karina Sabirova	23 March 1998 (aged 18)	1.81 m	0	0	(Russia) HC Astrakhanochka
32	LW	Kristina Kozhokar	28 February 1994 (aged 22)	1.74 m	1	2	(Russia) HC Astrakhanochka
34	RB	Elizaveta Malashenko	26 February 1996 (aged 20)	1.80 m	4	5	(Russia) Lada Togliatti
38	CB	Olga Gorshenina	9 November 1990 (aged 26)	1.79 m	36	22	(Russia) HC Kuban Krasnodar
39	RB	Antonina Skorobogatchenko	14 February 1999 (aged 17)	1.80 m	4	15	(Russia) Dinamo Volgograd
44	GK	Kira Trusova	28 June 1994 (aged 22)	1.82 m	5	0	(Russia) HC Astrakhanochka
88	GK	Victoriya Kalinina	8 December 1988 (aged 27)	1.83 m	52	0	(Russia) HC Kuban Krasnodar
