= 2011 European Women's U-19 Handball Championship =

European women handball championship

Tournament details
- Host country: Netherlands
- Venues: 5 (in 5 host cities)
- Dates: 4–14 August
- Teams: 16 (from 1 confederation)

Final positions
- Champions: Denmark (3rd title)
- Runners-up: Netherlands
- Third place: Austria
- Fourth place: Serbia

Tournament statistics
- Matches played: 56
- Goals scored: 2,893 (51.66 per match)
- Attendance: 23,055 (412 per match)
- Top scorers: Lois Abbingh (NED) (65 goals)

Awards
- Best player: Sonja Frey (AUT)

The 2011 European Women's U-19 Handball Championship is the eighth edition of the continental handball event for this age group, and the fourth under its new name, that is being held between 4 and 14 August in the Netherlands. Norway entered the championship as title holders, after beaten 2009 hosts Hungary 29–27 in the previous tournament's final. According to the competition regulations, only players born on or after 1 January 1992 are eligible to participate.

Denmark won the championship for the third time, beating first time finalists Netherlands in the decisive match 29–27.

== Venues ==
Five cities have been selected to stage the championship. In Almelo, Maastricht and Leek will only be held preliminary and main round matches. In Arnhem, where hosts Netherlands play their preliminary group, will also be held main round clashes and the placement matches 9–16. Rotterdam will be involved only in the final weekend to arrange the placement matches 5–8 as well as the semifinals, the bronze match and the final.

City	Arena	Capacity
Almelo	IISPA Almelo	1,000
Arnhem	Sportcentrum Valkenhuizen	1,850
Leek	Sportcentrum Leek	1,300
Maastricht	MECC Maastricht	1,500
Rotterdam	Topsportcentrum Rotterdam	2,000
2011 European Women's U-19 Handball Championship is located in Netherlands

== Qualification ==
A total of 29 national teams registered for the tournament, from which the four best placed teams of the 2009 European Women's U-19 Handball Championship, namely Denmark, France, Norway and Russia automatically qualified for the championship, joined by organizer country Netherlands. The remaining twenty-four teams competed between 21 and 24 April 2011 in six groups of four for the eleven spots left. Groups 1 to 5 offered two places each, while from the sixth group only the winner advanced to the European Championship. After the mini-tournaments were concluded, the following teams qualified for the continental event: Spain, Serbia (Group 1); Germany, Austria (Group 2); Hungary, Sweden (Group 3); Croatia, Poland (Group 4); Ukraine, Slovenia (Group 5) and Romania (Group 6).

== Draw ==
The draw for the groups of the final tournament took place in Leek, Netherlands, on 27 April 2011. In the process first the teams from pot 4, pot 3 and pot 1 were drawn, respectively, following that host nation Netherlands had the right to choose the group where they would like to be classified. The remaining three teams were distributed in the regular way.

=== Seedings ===
Pot 1	Pot 2	Pot 3	Pot 4
Denmark; Russia; Norway; France	Hungary; Netherlands; Spain; Germany	Romania; Croatia; Ukraine; Sweden	Serbia; Austria; Poland; Slovenia

== Preliminary round ==
Team advanced to the Main round
Team relegated to the Intermediate round

=== Group A ===
Team	Pld	W	D	L	GF	GA	GD	Pts
Romania	3	2	0	1	68	66	+2	4
Spain	3	2	0	1	66	62	+4	4
Russia	3	1	0	2	79	72	+7	2
Slovenia	3	1	0	2	61	74	−13	2

All times are Central European Summer Time (UTC+2)

4 August 2011; 18:00	Russia	25–26	Romania	IISPA Almelo, Almelo; Attendance: 250; Referees: Engkebølle Stenrand, Kærlund Birch (Denmark)
4 August 2011; 18:00	Dmitrieva 8	(12–13)	Buceschi 10	IISPA Almelo, Almelo; Attendance: 250; Referees: Engkebølle Stenrand, Kærlund Birch (Denmark)
4 August 2011; 18:00	3× (yellow card) 4× (suspension)	Report	3× (yellow card) 6× (suspension)	IISPA Almelo, Almelo; Attendance: 250; Referees: Engkebølle Stenrand, Kærlund Birch (Denmark)

4 August 2011; 20:00	Spain	23–17	Slovenia	IISPA Almelo, Almelo; Attendance: 250; Referees: Siewert Delle, Engberg (Sweden)
4 August 2011; 20:00	Fernandez, Falcon 6	(13–8)	Barič 7	IISPA Almelo, Almelo; Attendance: 250; Referees: Siewert Delle, Engberg (Sweden)
4 August 2011; 20:00	2× (yellow card) 3× (suspension)	Report	3× (yellow card) 5× (suspension) 1× (red card)	IISPA Almelo, Almelo; Attendance: 250; Referees: Siewert Delle, Engberg (Sweden)

5 August 2011; 18:00	Slovenia	22–34	Russia	IISPA Almelo, Almelo; Attendance: 250; Referees: Bounouara, Sami (France)
5 August 2011; 18:00	Hren 5	(9–17)	Denikaeva 6	IISPA Almelo, Almelo; Attendance: 250; Referees: Bounouara, Sami (France)
5 August 2011; 18:00	3× (yellow card) 6× (suspension)	Report	3× (yellow card) 4× (suspension)	IISPA Almelo, Almelo; Attendance: 250; Referees: Bounouara, Sami (France)

5 August 2011; 20:00	Romania	25–19	Spain	IISPA Almelo, Almelo; Attendance: 250; Referees: Engkebølle Stenrand, Kærlund Birch (Denmark)
5 August 2011; 20:00	Buceschi 10	(13–8)	Cobo 5	IISPA Almelo, Almelo; Attendance: 250; Referees: Engkebølle Stenrand, Kærlund Birch (Denmark)
5 August 2011; 20:00	3× (yellow card) 6× (suspension)	Report	3× (yellow card) 5× (suspension)	IISPA Almelo, Almelo; Attendance: 250; Referees: Engkebølle Stenrand, Kærlund Birch (Denmark)

7 August 2011; 16:00	Russia	20–24	Spain	IISPA Almelo, Almelo; Attendance: 400; Referees: Bounouara, Sami (France)
7 August 2011; 16:00	Dmitrieva, Garanina 7	(13–13)	Segura 7	IISPA Almelo, Almelo; Attendance: 400; Referees: Bounouara, Sami (France)
7 August 2011; 16:00	3× (yellow card) 5× (suspension) 1× (red card)	Report	3× (yellow card) 3× (suspension)	IISPA Almelo, Almelo; Attendance: 400; Referees: Bounouara, Sami (France)

7 August 2011; 18:00	Romania	17–22	Slovenia	IISPA Almelo, Almelo; Attendance: 300; Referees: Siewert Delle, Engberg (Sweden)
7 August 2011; 18:00	Buceschi 7	(9–10)	Barič 8	IISPA Almelo, Almelo; Attendance: 300; Referees: Siewert Delle, Engberg (Sweden)
7 August 2011; 18:00	2× (yellow card) 7× (suspension)	Report	3× (yellow card) 6× (suspension)	IISPA Almelo, Almelo; Attendance: 300; Referees: Siewert Delle, Engberg (Sweden)

=== Group B ===
Team	Pld	W	D	L	GF	GA	GD	Pts
Netherlands	3	3	0	0	100	76	+24	6
Austria	3	2	0	1	82	80	+2	4
Norway	3	1	0	2	71	70	+1	2
Ukraine	3	0	0	3	61	88	−27	0

All times are Central European Summer Time (UTC+2)

4 August 2011; 18:00	Norway	25–13	Ukraine	Sportcentrum Valkenhuizen, Arnhem; Attendance: 800; Referees: Pech, Vágvölgyi (Hungary)
4 August 2011; 18:00	Breistøl 6	(9–9)	Andriychuk, Metelska 4	Sportcentrum Valkenhuizen, Arnhem; Attendance: 800; Referees: Pech, Vágvölgyi (Hungary)
4 August 2011; 18:00	3× (yellow card) 4× (suspension)	Report	2× (yellow card) 5× (suspension)	Sportcentrum Valkenhuizen, Arnhem; Attendance: 800; Referees: Pech, Vágvölgyi (Hungary)

4 August 2011; 20:00	Netherlands	35–27	Austria	Sportcentrum Valkenhuizen, Arnhem; Attendance: 900; Referees: Antić, Jakovljević (Serbia)
4 August 2011; 20:00	Abbingh 10	(20–13)	Frey 10	Sportcentrum Valkenhuizen, Arnhem; Attendance: 900; Referees: Antić, Jakovljević (Serbia)
4 August 2011; 20:00	3× (yellow card) 4× (suspension)	Report	3× (yellow card) 9× (suspension)	Sportcentrum Valkenhuizen, Arnhem; Attendance: 900; Referees: Antić, Jakovljević (Serbia)

5 August 2011; 18:00	Austria	26–21	Norway	Sportcentrum Valkenhuizen, Arnhem; Attendance: 350; Referees: Brehmer, Skrowronek (Poland)
5 August 2011; 18:00	Frey 10	(10–14)	Henriksen 6	Sportcentrum Valkenhuizen, Arnhem; Attendance: 350; Referees: Brehmer, Skrowronek (Poland)
5 August 2011; 18:00	3× (yellow card) 6× (suspension) 1× (red card)	Report	3× (yellow card) 3× (suspension) 1× (red card)	Sportcentrum Valkenhuizen, Arnhem; Attendance: 350; Referees: Brehmer, Skrowronek (Poland)

5 August 2011; 20:00	Ukraine	24–34	Netherlands	Sportcentrum Valkenhuizen, Arnhem; Attendance: 750; Referees: Pech, Vágvölgyi (Hungary)
5 August 2011; 20:00	Metelska 8	(8–16)	Abbingh 11	Sportcentrum Valkenhuizen, Arnhem; Attendance: 750; Referees: Pech, Vágvölgyi (Hungary)
5 August 2011; 20:00	3× (yellow card) 4× (suspension)	Report	3× (yellow card) 6× (suspension)	Sportcentrum Valkenhuizen, Arnhem; Attendance: 750; Referees: Pech, Vágvölgyi (Hungary)

7 August 2011; 16:00	Ukraine	24–29	Austria	Sportcentrum Valkenhuizen, Arnhem; Attendance: 850; Referees: Antić, Jakovljević (Serbia)
7 August 2011; 16:00	Andriychuk 10	(10–17)	Frey 9	Sportcentrum Valkenhuizen, Arnhem; Attendance: 850; Referees: Antić, Jakovljević (Serbia)
7 August 2011; 16:00	3× (yellow card) 4× (suspension)	Report	3× (yellow card) 5× (suspension)	Sportcentrum Valkenhuizen, Arnhem; Attendance: 850; Referees: Antić, Jakovljević (Serbia)

7 August 2011; 18:00	Norway	25–31	Netherlands	Sportcentrum Valkenhuizen, Arnhem; Attendance: 1,385; Referees: Brehmer, Skowronek (Poland)
7 August 2011; 18:00	Rasmussen 9	(13–12)	Abbingh 10	Sportcentrum Valkenhuizen, Arnhem; Attendance: 1,385; Referees: Brehmer, Skowronek (Poland)
7 August 2011; 18:00	3× (yellow card) 1× (suspension)	Report	3× (yellow card) 5× (suspension) 1× (red card)	Sportcentrum Valkenhuizen, Arnhem; Attendance: 1,385; Referees: Brehmer, Skowronek (Poland)

=== Group C ===
Team	Pld	W	D	L	GF	GA	GD	Pts
Denmark	3	3	0	0	92	70	+22	6
Croatia	3	1	1	1	78	81	−3	3
Hungary	3	1	1	1	81	86	−5	3
Poland	3	0	0	3	73	87	−14	0

All times are Central European Summer Time (UTC+2)

4 August 2011; 18:00	Denmark	33–22	Croatia	Sportcentrum Leek, Leek; Attendance: 150; Referees: Van Dijk, Wijtenburg (Netherlands)
4 August 2011; 18:00	Burgaard 9	(13–12)	Ježić, Toto 6	Sportcentrum Leek, Leek; Attendance: 150; Referees: Van Dijk, Wijtenburg (Netherlands)
4 August 2011; 18:00	3× (yellow card) 3× (suspension)	Report	3× (yellow card) 8× (suspension) 2× (red card)	Sportcentrum Leek, Leek; Attendance: 150; Referees: Van Dijk, Wijtenburg (Netherlands)

4 August 2011; 20:00	Hungary	31–27	Poland	Sportcentrum Leek, Leek; Attendance: 200; Referees: Konjičanin, Konjičanin (Bosnia and Herzegovina)
4 August 2011; 20:00	Klivinyi 12	(18–14)	Królikowska 6	Sportcentrum Leek, Leek; Attendance: 200; Referees: Konjičanin, Konjičanin (Bosnia and Herzegovina)
4 August 2011; 20:00	2× (yellow card) 3× (suspension)	Report	3× (yellow card) 2× (suspension)	Sportcentrum Leek, Leek; Attendance: 200; Referees: Konjičanin, Konjičanin (Bosnia and Herzegovina)

5 August 2011; 18:00	Poland	26–28	Denmark	Sportcentrum Leek, Leek; Attendance: 150; Referees: van Dijk, Wijtenburg (Netherlands)
5 August 2011; 18:00	Galińska 6	(13–13)	Aagaard, Pedersen 6	Sportcentrum Leek, Leek; Attendance: 150; Referees: van Dijk, Wijtenburg (Netherlands)
5 August 2011; 18:00	3× (yellow card) 3× (suspension)	Report	2× (yellow card) 2× (suspension)	Sportcentrum Leek, Leek; Attendance: 150; Referees: van Dijk, Wijtenburg (Netherlands)

5 August 2011; 20:00	Croatia	28–28	Hungary	Sportcentrum Leek, Leek; Attendance: 200; Referees: Bernet, Wick (Switzerland)
5 August 2011; 20:00	Milič 8	(11–11)	Hornyák 10	Sportcentrum Leek, Leek; Attendance: 200; Referees: Bernet, Wick (Switzerland)
5 August 2011; 20:00	3× (yellow card) 6× (suspension) 1× (red card)	Report	3× (yellow card) 3× (suspension)	Sportcentrum Leek, Leek; Attendance: 200; Referees: Bernet, Wick (Switzerland)

7 August 2011; 16:00	Denmark	31–22	Hungary	Sportcentrum Leek, Leek; Attendance: 200; Referees: Bernet, Wick (Switzerland)
7 August 2011; 16:00	Burgaard 8	(18–10)	Klivinyi 11	Sportcentrum Leek, Leek; Attendance: 200; Referees: Bernet, Wick (Switzerland)
7 August 2011; 16:00	2× (yellow card) 1× (suspension)	Report	3× (yellow card) 3× (suspension)	Sportcentrum Leek, Leek; Attendance: 200; Referees: Bernet, Wick (Switzerland)

7 August 2011; 18:00	Croatia	28–20	Poland	Sportcentrum Leek, Leek; Attendance: 100; Referees: Konjičanin, Konjičanin (Bosnia and Herzegovina)
7 August 2011; 18:00	Toto 10	(11–7)	A. Mączka 6	Sportcentrum Leek, Leek; Attendance: 100; Referees: Konjičanin, Konjičanin (Bosnia and Herzegovina)
7 August 2011; 18:00	2× (yellow card) 4× (suspension)	Report	3× (yellow card) 5× (suspension)	Sportcentrum Leek, Leek; Attendance: 100; Referees: Konjičanin, Konjičanin (Bosnia and Herzegovina)

=== Group D ===
Team	Pld	W	D	L	GF	GA	GD	Pts
Serbia	3	2	0	1	76	78	−2	4
Sweden	3	2	0	1	80	78	+2	4
France	3	1	0	2	83	73	+10	2
Germany	3	1	0	2	59	69	−10	2

All times are Central European Summer Time (UTC+2)

4 August 2011; 18:00	France	26–27	Sweden	MECC Maastricht, Maastricht; Attendance: 250; Referees: Covalciuc, Covalciuc (Moldova)
4 August 2011; 18:00	Coatanea, Zaadi 6	(12–16)	Adler 8	MECC Maastricht, Maastricht; Attendance: 250; Referees: Covalciuc, Covalciuc (Moldova)
4 August 2011; 18:00	3× (yellow card) 4× (suspension)	Report	3× (yellow card) 3× (suspension)	MECC Maastricht, Maastricht; Attendance: 250; Referees: Covalciuc, Covalciuc (Moldova)

4 August 2011; 20:00	Germany	21–16	Serbia	MECC Maastricht, Maastricht; Attendance: 300; Referees: Ilieva, Karbeska (Macedonia)
4 August 2011; 20:00	Minevskaja, Müller, Windisch 4	(13–6)	Filipović, Vasić 4	MECC Maastricht, Maastricht; Attendance: 300; Referees: Ilieva, Karbeska (Macedonia)
4 August 2011; 20:00	3× (yellow card) 3× (suspension)	Report	3× (yellow card) 3× (suspension)	MECC Maastricht, Maastricht; Attendance: 300; Referees: Ilieva, Karbeska (Macedonia)

5 August 2011; 18:00	Serbia	33–31	France	MECC Maastricht, Maastricht; Attendance: 200; Referees: Panayides, Andreou (Cyprus)
5 August 2011; 18:00	Georgijev 8	(17–18)	Coatanea 9	MECC Maastricht, Maastricht; Attendance: 200; Referees: Panayides, Andreou (Cyprus)
5 August 2011; 18:00	3× (yellow card) 5× (suspension) 1× (red card)	Report	3× (yellow card) 4× (suspension)	MECC Maastricht, Maastricht; Attendance: 200; Referees: Panayides, Andreou (Cyprus)

5 August 2011; 20:00	Sweden	27–25	Germany	MECC Maastricht, Maastricht; Attendance: 200; Referees: Covalciuc, Covalciuc (Moldova)
5 August 2011; 20:00	Adler 9	(15–12)	Minevskaja 7	MECC Maastricht, Maastricht; Attendance: 200; Referees: Covalciuc, Covalciuc (Moldova)
5 August 2011; 20:00	3× (yellow card) 3× (suspension)	Report	2× (yellow card) 4× (suspension)	MECC Maastricht, Maastricht; Attendance: 200; Referees: Covalciuc, Covalciuc (Moldova)

7 August 2011; 16:00	France	26–13	Germany	MECC Maastricht, Maastricht; Attendance: 200; Referees: Panayides, Andreou (Cyprus)
7 August 2011; 16:00	Lombardo, Zaadi 5	(12–6)	Minevskaja 7	MECC Maastricht, Maastricht; Attendance: 200; Referees: Panayides, Andreou (Cyprus)
7 August 2011; 16:00	3× (yellow card) 3× (suspension)	Report	3× (yellow card) 3× (suspension)	MECC Maastricht, Maastricht; Attendance: 200; Referees: Panayides, Andreou (Cyprus)

7 August 2011; 18:00	Sweden	26–27	Serbia	MECC Maastricht, Maastricht; Attendance: 200; Referees: Ilievska, Karbeska (Macedonia)
7 August 2011; 18:00	Adler 8	(14–11)	Popović 7	MECC Maastricht, Maastricht; Attendance: 200; Referees: Ilievska, Karbeska (Macedonia)
7 August 2011; 18:00	3× (yellow card) 3× (suspension)	Report	2× (yellow card) 3× (suspension)	MECC Maastricht, Maastricht; Attendance: 200; Referees: Ilievska, Karbeska (Macedonia)

== Intermediate round ==
=== Group I1 ===
Team	Pld	W	D	L	GF	GA	GD	Pts
Russia	3	3	0	0	92	65	+27	6
Norway	3	2	0	1	73	62	+11	4
Slovenia	3	1	0	2	66	82	−16	2
Ukraine	2	0	0	2	56	78	−22	0

All times are Central European Summer Time (UTC+2)

9 August 2011; 18:00	Slovenia	23–22	Ukraine	IISPA Almelo, Almelo; Attendance: 100; Referees: Panayidis, Andreou (Cyprus)
9 August 2011; 18:00	Amon, Krajnc 5	(8–9)	Andriychuk 7	IISPA Almelo, Almelo; Attendance: 100; Referees: Panayidis, Andreou (Cyprus)
9 August 2011; 18:00	3× (yellow card) 2× (suspension)	Report	3× (yellow card) 2× (suspension)	IISPA Almelo, Almelo; Attendance: 100; Referees: Panayidis, Andreou (Cyprus)

9 August 2011; 20:00	Russia	28–22	Norway	IISPA Almelo, Almelo; Attendance: 200; Referees: Pech, Vágvölgyi (Hungary)
9 August 2011; 20:00	Vedekhina 8	(9–10)	Rasmussen 8	IISPA Almelo, Almelo; Attendance: 200; Referees: Pech, Vágvölgyi (Hungary)
9 August 2011; 20:00	3× (yellow card) 4× (suspension)	Report	3× (yellow card) 4× (suspension)	IISPA Almelo, Almelo; Attendance: 200; Referees: Pech, Vágvölgyi (Hungary)

10 August 2011; 18:00	Ukraine	21–30	Russia	IISPA Almelo, Almelo; Attendance: 150
10 August 2011; 18:00	Metelska 7	(12–18)	Dmitrieva 9	IISPA Almelo, Almelo; Attendance: 150
10 August 2011; 18:00	2× (yellow card) 4× (suspension) 1× (red card)	Report	3× (yellow card) 1× (suspension)	IISPA Almelo, Almelo; Attendance: 150

10 August 2011; 20:00	Norway	26–21	Slovenia	IISPA Almelo, Almelo; Attendance: 300
10 August 2011; 20:00	Wahlquist 10	(16–8)	Barič 6	IISPA Almelo, Almelo; Attendance: 300
10 August 2011; 20:00	3× (yellow card) 3× (suspension)	Report	2× (yellow card) 3× (suspension)	IISPA Almelo, Almelo; Attendance: 300

=== Group I2 ===
Team	Pld	W	D	L	GF	GA	GD	Pts
France	3	2	0	1	84	71	+13	4
Germany	3	2	0	1	59	65	−6	4
Hungary	3	1	0	2	79	82	−3	2
Poland	3	1	0	2	76	80	−4	2

All times are Central European Summer Time (UTC+2)

9 August 2011; 18:00	Poland	19–20	Germany	Sportcentrum Leek, Leek; Attendance: 100; Referees: Antić, Jakovljević (Serbia)
9 August 2011; 18:00	A. Mączka 8	(9–9)	Diehl 4	Sportcentrum Leek, Leek; Attendance: 100; Referees: Antić, Jakovljević (Serbia)
9 August 2011; 18:00	3× (yellow card) 3× (suspension)	Report	3× (yellow card) 7× (suspension)	Sportcentrum Leek, Leek; Attendance: 100; Referees: Antić, Jakovljević (Serbia)

9 August 2011; 20:00	Hungary	28–29	France	Sportcentrum Leek, Leek; Attendance: 100; Referees: Konjičanin, Konjičanin (Bosnia and Herzegovina)
9 August 2011; 20:00	Hornyák 10	(11–16)	Lassource 8	Sportcentrum Leek, Leek; Attendance: 100; Referees: Konjičanin, Konjičanin (Bosnia and Herzegovina)
9 August 2011; 20:00	3× (yellow card) 3× (suspension)	Report	2× (yellow card) 8× (suspension) 1× (red card)	Sportcentrum Leek, Leek; Attendance: 100; Referees: Konjičanin, Konjičanin (Bosnia and Herzegovina)

10 August 2011; 18:00	Germany	26–20	Hungary	Sportcentrum Leek, Leek; Attendance: 100
10 August 2011; 18:00	Minevskaja 8	(11–12)	Hornyák 6	Sportcentrum Leek, Leek; Attendance: 100
10 August 2011; 18:00	3× (yellow card) 3× (suspension)	Report	3× (yellow card) 5× (suspension)	Sportcentrum Leek, Leek; Attendance: 100

10 August 2011; 20:00	France	29–30	Poland	Sportcentrum Leek, Leek; Attendance: 150
10 August 2011; 20:00	Lombardo 9	(11–21)	Królikowska, M. Mączka 6	Sportcentrum Leek, Leek; Attendance: 150
10 August 2011; 20:00	3× (yellow card) 7× (suspension)	Report	3× (yellow card) 5× (suspension)	Sportcentrum Leek, Leek; Attendance: 150

== Main round ==
=== Group M1 ===
Team	Pld	W	D	L	GF	GA	GD	Pts
Netherlands	3	3	0	0	103	80	+23	6
Austria	3	2	0	1	78	80	−2	4
Romania	3	1	0	2	74	82	−8	2
Spain	3	0	0	3	68	81	−13	0

All times are Central European Summer Time (UTC+2)

9 August 2011; 18:00	Spain	23–27	Austria	Sportcentrum Valkenhuizen, Arnhem; Attendance: 750; Referees: Ilieva, Karbeska (Macedonia)
9 August 2011; 18:00	Gonzalez 6	(12–12)	Frey 10	Sportcentrum Valkenhuizen, Arnhem; Attendance: 750; Referees: Ilieva, Karbeska (Macedonia)
9 August 2011; 18:00	3× (yellow card) 1× (suspension)	Report	3× (yellow card) 4× (suspension)	Sportcentrum Valkenhuizen, Arnhem; Attendance: 750; Referees: Ilieva, Karbeska (Macedonia)

9 August 2011; 20:00	Romania	27–39	Netherlands	Sportcentrum Valkenhuizen, Arnhem; Attendance: 1,000; Referees: Engkebølle Stenrand, Kærlund Birch (Denmark)
9 August 2011; 20:00	Apipiei 9	(16–19)	Abbingh 9	Sportcentrum Valkenhuizen, Arnhem; Attendance: 1,000; Referees: Engkebølle Stenrand, Kærlund Birch (Denmark)
9 August 2011; 20:00	3× (yellow card) 4× (suspension)	Report	3× (yellow card) 3× (suspension)	Sportcentrum Valkenhuizen, Arnhem; Attendance: 1,000; Referees: Engkebølle Stenrand, Kærlund Birch (Denmark)

10 August 2011; 18:00	Austria	24–22	Romania	Sportcentrum Valkenhuizen, Arnhem; Attendance: 750
10 August 2011; 18:00	Frey 8	(10–14)	Buceschi 8	Sportcentrum Valkenhuizen, Arnhem; Attendance: 750
10 August 2011; 18:00	3× (yellow card) 5× (suspension)	Report	3× (yellow card) 7× (suspension)	Sportcentrum Valkenhuizen, Arnhem; Attendance: 750

10 August 2011; 20:00	Netherlands	29–26	Spain	Sportcentrum Valkenhuizen, Arnhem; Attendance: 1,300
10 August 2011; 20:00	Abbingh 9	(15–15)	Sempere Herrera 8	Sportcentrum Valkenhuizen, Arnhem; Attendance: 1,300
10 August 2011; 20:00	3× (yellow card) 4× (suspension)	Report	2× (yellow card) 3× (suspension)	Sportcentrum Valkenhuizen, Arnhem; Attendance: 1,300

=== Group M2 ===
Team	Pld	W	D	L	GF	GA	GD	Pts
Denmark	3	3	0	0	90	73	+17	6
Serbia	3	2	0	1	82	80	+2	4
Sweden	3	1	0	2	81	73	+8	2
Croatia	3	0	0	3	65	92	−27	0

All times are Central European Summer Time (UTC+2)

9 August 2011; 18:00	Croatia	20–30	Sweden	MECC Maastricht, Maastricht; Attendance: 200; Referees: van Dijk, Wijtenburg (Netherlands)
9 August 2011; 18:00	Milič 6	(9–12)	Adler, Larsson, Wall 5	MECC Maastricht, Maastricht; Attendance: 200; Referees: van Dijk, Wijtenburg (Netherlands)
9 August 2011; 18:00	3× (yellow card) 5× (suspension)	Report	3× (yellow card) 5× (suspension)	MECC Maastricht, Maastricht; Attendance: 200; Referees: van Dijk, Wijtenburg (Netherlands)

9 August 2011; 20:00	Denmark	31–26	Serbia	MECC Maastricht, Maastricht; Attendance: 375; Referees: Covalciuc, Covalciuc (Moldova)
9 August 2011; 20:00	Woller 10	(18–13)	Georgijev 8	MECC Maastricht, Maastricht; Attendance: 375; Referees: Covalciuc, Covalciuc (Moldova)
9 August 2011; 20:00	2× (yellow card) 2× (suspension)	Report	3× (yellow card) 1× (suspension)	MECC Maastricht, Maastricht; Attendance: 375; Referees: Covalciuc, Covalciuc (Moldova)

10 August 2011; 18:00	Sweden	25–26	Denmark	MECC Maastricht, Maastricht; Attendance: 350
10 August 2011; 18:00	Adler 8	(13–12)	Strangholt 7	MECC Maastricht, Maastricht; Attendance: 350
10 August 2011; 18:00	3× (yellow card) 5× (suspension) 1× (red card)	Report	2× (yellow card) 3× (suspension)	MECC Maastricht, Maastricht; Attendance: 350

10 August 2011; 20:00	Serbia	29–23	Croatia	MECC Maastricht, Maastricht; Attendance: 350
10 August 2011; 20:00	Georgijev, I. Popović 6	(14–16)	Toto 6	MECC Maastricht, Maastricht; Attendance: 350
10 August 2011; 20:00	2× (yellow card) 7× (suspension) 1× (red card)	Report	3× (yellow card) 3× (suspension)	MECC Maastricht, Maastricht; Attendance: 350

== Placement round 13–16 ==
=== Bracket ===
Cross matches
12 August – 12:30 (Arnhem)
Slovenia	25
Poland	26
12 August – 15:00 (Arnhem)
Hungary	28
Ukraine	22

13th place final
13 August – 15:00 (Arnhem)
Poland	27
Hungary	23
15th place final
13 August – 12:30 (Arnhem)
Slovenia	25
Ukraine	20

=== Cross matches ===
12 August 2011; 12:30	Slovenia	25–26	Poland	Sportcentrum Valkenhuizen, Arnhem; Attendance: 50; Referees: van Dijk, Wijtenburg (Netherlands)
12 August 2011; 12:30	Krajnc 7	(13–9)	Królikowska 6	Sportcentrum Valkenhuizen, Arnhem; Attendance: 50; Referees: van Dijk, Wijtenburg (Netherlands)
12 August 2011; 12:30	2× (yellow card) 2× (suspension)	Report	3× (yellow card) 4× (suspension)	Sportcentrum Valkenhuizen, Arnhem; Attendance: 50; Referees: van Dijk, Wijtenburg (Netherlands)

12 August 2011; 15:00	Hungary	28–22	Ukraine	Sportcentrum Valkenhuizen, Arnhem; Attendance: 55; Referees: Panayides, Andreou (Cyprus)
12 August 2011; 15:00	Klivinyi 8	(15–14)	Metelska 5	Sportcentrum Valkenhuizen, Arnhem; Attendance: 55; Referees: Panayides, Andreou (Cyprus)
12 August 2011; 15:00	3× (yellow card) 4× (suspension)	Report	3× (yellow card) 8× (suspension) 1× (red card)	Sportcentrum Valkenhuizen, Arnhem; Attendance: 55; Referees: Panayides, Andreou (Cyprus)

=== 15th place final ===
13 August 2011; 12:30	Slovenia	25–20	Ukraine	Sportcentrum Valkenhuizen, Arnhem; Attendance: 50; Referees: Ilieva, Karbeska (Macedonia)
13 August 2011; 12:30	Krajnc 8	(10–6)	Myhovich 5	Sportcentrum Valkenhuizen, Arnhem; Attendance: 50; Referees: Ilieva, Karbeska (Macedonia)
13 August 2011; 12:30	1× (yellow card) 3× (suspension)	Report	2× (yellow card) 2× (suspension)	Sportcentrum Valkenhuizen, Arnhem; Attendance: 50; Referees: Ilieva, Karbeska (Macedonia)

=== 13th place final ===
13 August 2011; 15:00	Poland	27–23	Hungary	Sportcentrum Valkenhuizen, Arnhem; Attendance: 89; Referees: Bernet, Wick (Switzerland)
13 August 2011; 15:00	Mączka 11	(14–10)	Such 6	Sportcentrum Valkenhuizen, Arnhem; Attendance: 89; Referees: Bernet, Wick (Switzerland)
13 August 2011; 15:00	3× (yellow card) 1× (suspension)	Report	3× (yellow card) 2× (suspension)	Sportcentrum Valkenhuizen, Arnhem; Attendance: 89; Referees: Bernet, Wick (Switzerland)

== Placement round 9–12 ==
=== Bracket ===
Cross matches
12 August – 17:30 (Arnhem)
Russia	38
Germany	26
12 August – 20:00 (Arnhem)
France	20
Norway	19

9th place final
13 August – 20:00 (Arnhem)
Russia	29
France	23
11th place final
13 August – 17:30 (Arnhem)
Germany	32
Norway	20

=== Cross matches ===
12 August 2011; 17:30	Russia	38–26	Germany	Sportcentrum Valkenhuizen, Arnhem; Attendance: 220; Referees: Konjičanin, Konjičanin (Bosnia and Herzegovina)
12 August 2011; 17:30	Garanina 8	(19–10)	Haupt 6	Sportcentrum Valkenhuizen, Arnhem; Attendance: 220; Referees: Konjičanin, Konjičanin (Bosnia and Herzegovina)
12 August 2011; 17:30	3× (yellow card) 5× (suspension)	Report	3× (yellow card) 5× (suspension)	Sportcentrum Valkenhuizen, Arnhem; Attendance: 220; Referees: Konjičanin, Konjičanin (Bosnia and Herzegovina)

12 August 2011; 20:00	France	20–19	Norway	Sportcentrum Valkenhuizen, Arnhem; Attendance: 130; Referees: Bernet, Wick (Switzerland)
12 August 2011; 20:00	Coatanea 5	(10–14)	Merg, Rasmussen, Wahlquist 4	Sportcentrum Valkenhuizen, Arnhem; Attendance: 130; Referees: Bernet, Wick (Switzerland)
12 August 2011; 20:00	3× (yellow card) 3× (suspension)	Report	3× (yellow card) 1× (suspension)	Sportcentrum Valkenhuizen, Arnhem; Attendance: 130; Referees: Bernet, Wick (Switzerland)

=== 11th place final ===
13 August 2011; 17:30	Germany	32–20	Norway	Sportcentrum Valkenhuizen, Arnhem; Attendance: 125; Referees: Pech, Vágvölgyi (Hungary)
13 August 2011; 17:30	Minevskaja 11	(16–9)	Bjørnsen, Wisløff 4	Sportcentrum Valkenhuizen, Arnhem; Attendance: 125; Referees: Pech, Vágvölgyi (Hungary)
13 August 2011; 17:30	3× (yellow card) 1× (suspension)	Report	3× (yellow card) 2× (suspension)	Sportcentrum Valkenhuizen, Arnhem; Attendance: 125; Referees: Pech, Vágvölgyi (Hungary)

=== 9th place final ===
13 August 2011; 20:00	Russia	29–23	France	Sportcentrum Valkenhuizen, Arnhem; Attendance: 126; Referees: van Dijk, Wijtenburg (Netherlands)
13 August 2011; 20:00	Dmitrieva 6	(14–10)	Francois 7	Sportcentrum Valkenhuizen, Arnhem; Attendance: 126; Referees: van Dijk, Wijtenburg (Netherlands)
13 August 2011; 20:00	2× (yellow card) 6× (suspension)	Report	3× (yellow card) 6× (suspension)	Sportcentrum Valkenhuizen, Arnhem; Attendance: 126; Referees: van Dijk, Wijtenburg (Netherlands)

== Placement round 5–8 ==
=== Bracket ===
Cross matches
12 August – 12:30 (Rotterdam)
Romania	30
Croatia	29
12 August – 15:00 (Rotterdam)
Sweden	32
Spain	25

5th place final
13 August – 17:30 (Rotterdam)
Romania	20
Sweden	30
7th place final
13 August – 15:00 (Rotterdam)
Croatia	28
Spain	26

=== Cross matches ===
12 August 2011; 12:30	Romania	30–29	Croatia	Topsportcentrum Rotterdam, Rotterdam; Attendance: 400; Referees: Brehmer, Skowronek (Poland)
12 August 2011; 12:30	Buceschi 9	(14–14)	Čović, Toto 8	Topsportcentrum Rotterdam, Rotterdam; Attendance: 400; Referees: Brehmer, Skowronek (Poland)
12 August 2011; 12:30	3× (yellow card) 3× (suspension)	Report	2× (yellow card) 5× (suspension)	Topsportcentrum Rotterdam, Rotterdam; Attendance: 400; Referees: Brehmer, Skowronek (Poland)

12 August 2011; 15:00	Sweden	32–25	Spain	Topsportcentrum Rotterdam, Rotterdam; Attendance: 400; Referees: Engkebølle Stenrand, Kærlund Birch (Denmark)
12 August 2011; 15:00	Adler 7	(18–13)	Falcon 5	Topsportcentrum Rotterdam, Rotterdam; Attendance: 400; Referees: Engkebølle Stenrand, Kærlund Birch (Denmark)
12 August 2011; 15:00	3× (yellow card) 5× (suspension)	Report	3× (yellow card) 4× (suspension)	Topsportcentrum Rotterdam, Rotterdam; Attendance: 400; Referees: Engkebølle Stenrand, Kærlund Birch (Denmark)

=== 7th place final ===
13 August 2011; 15:00	Croatia	28–26	Spain	Topsportcentrum Rotterdam, Rotterdam; Attendance: 200; Referees: Siewert Delle, Engberg (Sweden)
13 August 2011; 15:00	Milič 13	(12–13)	Falcon 7	Topsportcentrum Rotterdam, Rotterdam; Attendance: 200; Referees: Siewert Delle, Engberg (Sweden)
13 August 2011; 15:00	3× (yellow card) 3× (suspension)	Report	2× (yellow card) 3× (suspension)	Topsportcentrum Rotterdam, Rotterdam; Attendance: 200; Referees: Siewert Delle, Engberg (Sweden)

=== 5th place final ===
13 August 2011; 17:30	Romania	20–30	Sweden	Topsportcentrum Rotterdam, Rotterdam; Attendance: 150; Referees: Antić, Jakovljević (Serbia)
13 August 2011; 17:30	Buceschi 6	(11–15)	Adler 8	Topsportcentrum Rotterdam, Rotterdam; Attendance: 150; Referees: Antić, Jakovljević (Serbia)
13 August 2011; 17:30	3× (yellow card) 6× (suspension)	Report	3× (yellow card) 4× (suspension)	Topsportcentrum Rotterdam, Rotterdam; Attendance: 150; Referees: Antić, Jakovljević (Serbia)

== Final round ==
=== Bracket ===
Semifinals
12 August – 17:30 (Rotterdam)
Denmark	29
Austria	17
12 August – 20:00 (Rotterdam)
Netherlands	42
Serbia	33

Final
14 August – 17:30 (Rotterdam)
Netherlands	27
Denmark	29
Bronze medal match
14 August – 15:00 (Rotterdam)
Serbia	28
Austria	34

=== Cross matches ===
12 August 2011; 17:30	Denmark	29–17	Austria	Topsportcentrum Rotterdam, Rotterdam; Attendance: 700; Referees: Covalciuc, Covalciuc (Moldova)
12 August 2011; 17:30	Burgaard, Woller 6	(16–7)	Frey 6	Topsportcentrum Rotterdam, Rotterdam; Attendance: 700; Referees: Covalciuc, Covalciuc (Moldova)
12 August 2011; 17:30	2× (yellow card)	Report	3× (yellow card) 2× (suspension)	Topsportcentrum Rotterdam, Rotterdam; Attendance: 700; Referees: Covalciuc, Covalciuc (Moldova)

12 August 2011; 20:00	Netherlands	42–33	Serbia	Topsportcentrum Rotterdam, Rotterdam; Attendance: 950; Referees: Bonouara, Sami (France)
12 August 2011; 20:00	Malestein 9	(18–17)	Georgijev, Vasić 6	Topsportcentrum Rotterdam, Rotterdam; Attendance: 950; Referees: Bonouara, Sami (France)
12 August 2011; 20:00	3× (yellow card) 2× (suspension)	Report	3× (yellow card) 4× (suspension)	Topsportcentrum Rotterdam, Rotterdam; Attendance: 950; Referees: Bonouara, Sami (France)

=== Bronze medal match ===
14 August 2011; 15:00	Serbia	28–34	Austria	Topsportcentrum Rotterdam, Rotterdam; Attendance: 2,000; Referees: Engkebølle Stenrand, Kærlund Birch (Denmark)
14 August 2011; 15:00	Filipović 10	(13–15)	Frey 10	Topsportcentrum Rotterdam, Rotterdam; Attendance: 2,000; Referees: Engkebølle Stenrand, Kærlund Birch (Denmark)
14 August 2011; 15:00	3× (yellow card) 3× (suspension)	Report	3× (yellow card) 3× (suspension)	Topsportcentrum Rotterdam, Rotterdam; Attendance: 2,000; Referees: Engkebølle Stenrand, Kærlund Birch (Denmark)

=== Final ===
14 August 2011; 17:30	Netherlands	27–29	Denmark	Topsportcentrum Rotterdam, Rotterdam; Attendance: 2,100; Referees: Brehmer, Skowronek (Poland)
14 August 2011; 17:30	Abbingh 9	(13–17)	Woller 7	Topsportcentrum Rotterdam, Rotterdam; Attendance: 2,100; Referees: Brehmer, Skowronek (Poland)
14 August 2011; 17:30	3× (yellow card) 4× (suspension)	Report	2× (yellow card) 2× (suspension)	Topsportcentrum Rotterdam, Rotterdam; Attendance: 2,100; Referees: Brehmer, Skowronek (Poland)

== Rankings and awardees ==
=== Final ranking ===
Gold medal	Denmark
Silver medal	Netherlands
Bronze medal	Austria
4	Serbia
5	Sweden
6	Romania
7	Croatia
8	Spain
9	Russia
10	France
11	Germany
12	Norway
13	Poland
14	Hungary
15	Slovenia
16	Ukraine

2011 Women's 19 European Champions

Denmark

=== All Star Team ===
- Goalkeeper: Jovana Risović (SRB)
- Left Wing: Fie Woller (DEN)
- Left Back: Maria Adler (SWE)
- Playmaker: Estavana Polman (NED)
- Pivot: Katarina Ježić (CRO)
- Right Back: Louise Burgaard (DEN)
- Right Wing: Angela Malestein (NED)

=== Other awards ===
- Top Scorer: Lois Abbingh (NED)
- Best Defence Player: Mathilde Bjerregaard (DEN)
- Most Valuable Player: Sonja Frey (AUT)

Source: eurohandball.com Archived 17 September 2011 at the Wayback Machine
