= Valentina Panger =

Slovenian handball player

Personal information
- Nationality: Slovenian
- Born: 14 January 1991 (age 35) Izola, Slovenia
- Height: 1.68 m (5 ft 6 in)

Sport
- Sport: Handball
- Position: Pivot
- Current club: RK Zagorje
- Number: 7
National team
| Years | Team | Apps | (Gls) |
| – | Slovenia | 6 | (4) |

Valentina Panger (born 14 January 1991) is a Slovenian handball player for RK Zagorje and the Slovenian national team.

She participated at the 2016 European Women's Handball Championship.
