= Neli Irman =

Slovenian handball player

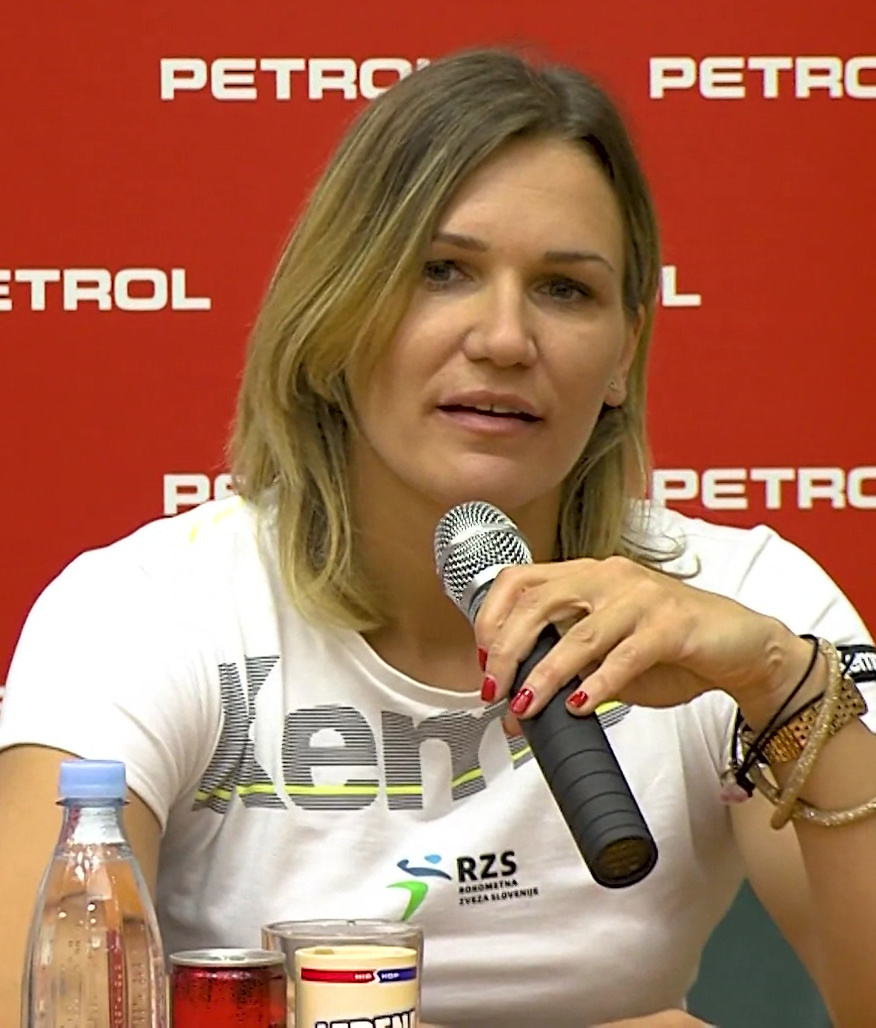

Personal information
- Nationality: Slovenian
- Born: 7 April 1986 (age 40) Celje, SR Slovenia, SFR Yugoslavia
- Height: 1.73 m (5 ft 8 in)

Sport
- Sport: Handball
- Position: Right wing
- Current club: Retired

Senior clubs
- Years: Team
- –2005: RK Celeia Žalec
- 2005–2009: RK Krim
- 2009–2011: ŽRK Olimpija Ljubljana
- 2011–2013: RŽK Zagorje
- 2013–2014: RK Krim
- 2014–2014: RŽK Zagorje
- 2014–2014: ŽRK Lokomotiva Zagreb
- 2014–2016: RŽK Zagorje
- 2016–2017: ŽRK Budućnost Podgorica
- 2017–2021: Spono Eagles
National team
Years	Team	Apps	(Gls)
–	Slovenia	115	(292)
Medal record
Representing Slovenia
Mediterranean Games
Silver medal – second place	2013 Mersin	Team

Neli Irman (born 7 April 1986) is a Slovenian former handball player for the Slovenian national team.

She played for Spono Eagles in Switzerland, ŽRK Lokomotiva Zagreb in Croatia, ŽRK Budućnost Podgorica in Montenegro, as well as RŽK Zagorje, ŽRK Olimpija Ljubljana, RK Krim and RK Celeia Žalec in her home country. She retired in 2021.
