= Janja Rebolj =

Slovenian handball player

Personal information
- Nationality: Slovenian
- Born: 29 January 1993 (age 33) Trbovlje, Slovenia
- Height: 1.73 m (5 ft 8 in)

Sport
- Sport: Handball
- Position: Right back
- Current club: RK Zagorje
- Number: 8
National team
Years	Team	Apps	(Gls)
–	Slovenia	6	(8)

Janja Rebolj (born 29 January 1993) is a Slovenian handball player for RK Zagorje and the Slovenian national team.

She participated at the 2016 European Women's Handball Championship.
