= Sonja Frey =

Austrian handball player (born 1993)

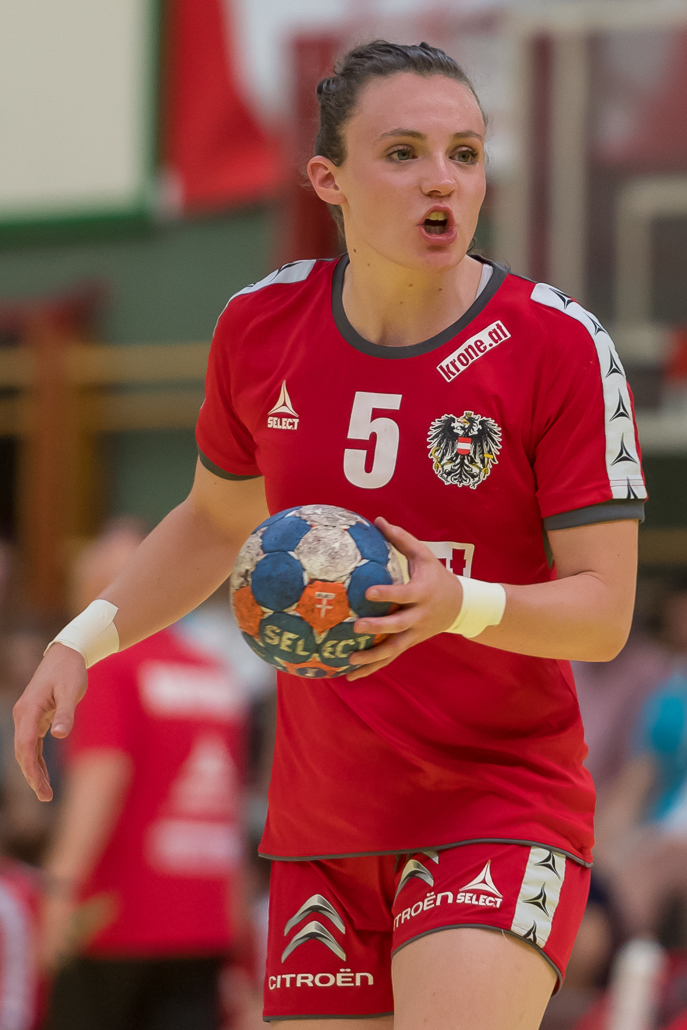

Personal information
- Full name: Sonja Frey
- Nationality: Austrian
- Born: 22 April 1993 (age 33) Vienna, Austria
- Height: 1.69 m (5 ft 7 in)

Sport
- Sport: Handball
- Position: Centre back/Left Wing
- Current club: Hypo Niederösterreich
- Number: 5

Youth career
- Years: Team
- 2001–2003: WAT Fünfhaus
- –: MGA Fivers

Senior clubs
- Years: Team
- –2012: MGA Fivers
- 2012–2016: Thüringer HC
- 2016–2017: Dijon Bourgogne Handball
- 2017–2019: Issy-Paris Hand
- 2019–2021: Team Esbjerg
- 2021–2022: Herning-Ikast Håndbold
- 2022–2024: Thüringer HC
- 2024–: Hypo Niederösterreich
National team
Years	Team	Apps	(Gls)
2009–	Austria	124	(573)
- Updated on 6 November 2014

Sonja Frey (born 22 April 1993) is an Austrian handballer who plays as a centre back for Hypo Niederösterreich and the Austria women's national handball team.

== Achievements ==
- Bundesliga:
  - Winner: 2013, 2014, 2015
- DHB Pokal:
  - Winner: 2013
- Danish Championship:
  - Winner: 2020
- Austrian Championship:
  - Winner: 2025, 2026
- Austrian Cup:
  - Winner: 2025, 2026
- European Junior Championship:
  - Bronze Medalist: 2011

== Individual awards ==
- Most Valuable Player of the European Junior Championship: 2011
