= Marie François (handballer) =

French handball player (born 1993)

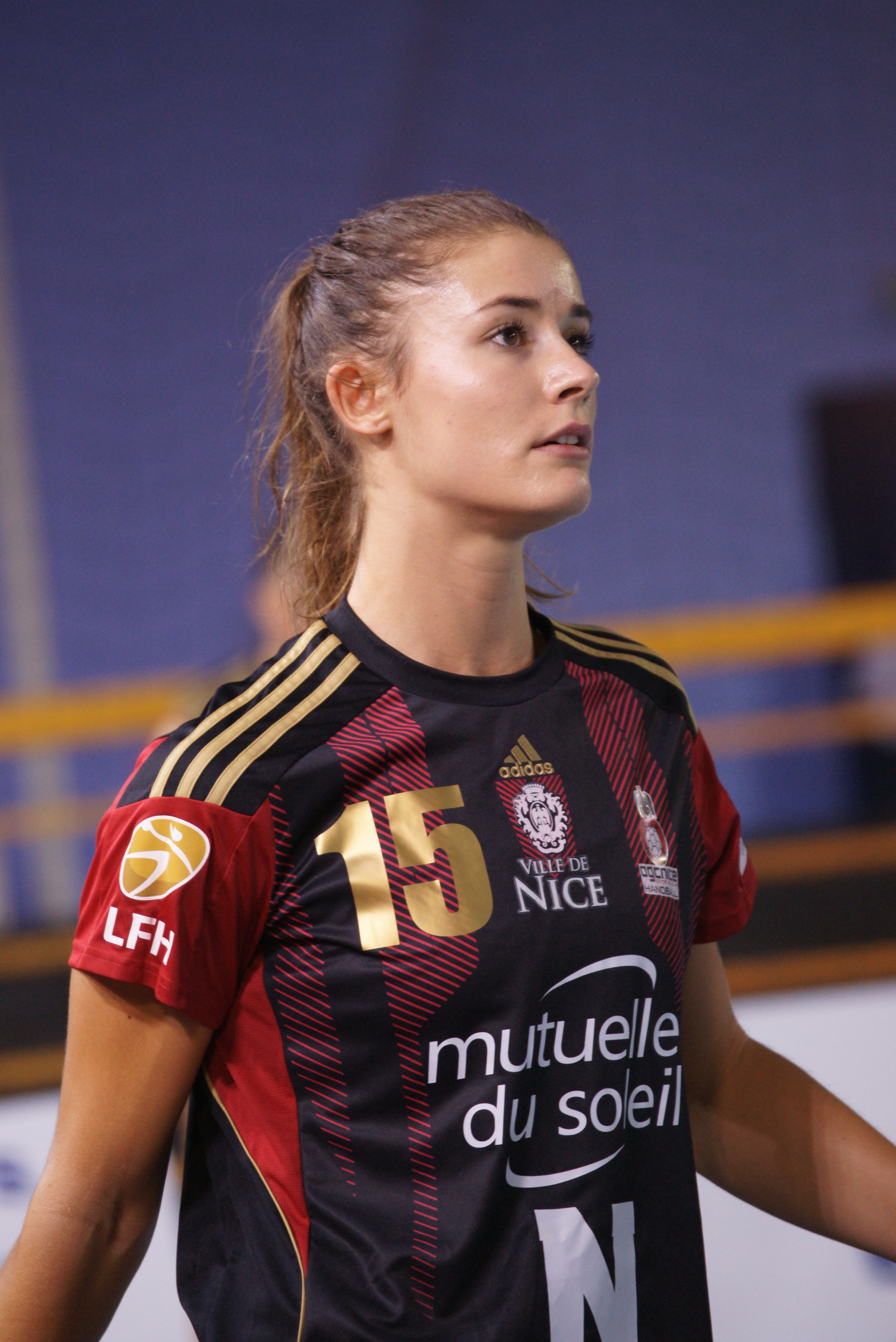

Personal information
- Nationality: French
- Born: 14 August 1993 (age 33) Ambilly, France
- Height: 1.77 m (5 ft 10 in)

Sport
- Sport: Handball
- Position: Right back
- Current club: OGC Nice Côte d'Azur Handball
- Number: 15
National team
Years	Team	Apps	(Gls)
2014-2015	France	5	(6)

Marie François (born 14 August 1993 in Ambilly, France) is a French handball player for OGC Nice Côte d'Azur Handball and the French national team.
