= Ines Amon =

Slovenian handball player

Personal information
- Nationality: Slovenian
- Born: 13 July 1992 (age 34) Celje, Slovenia
- Height: 1.71 m (5 ft 7 in)

Sport
- Sport: Handball
- Position: Left wing
- Current club: RK Krim
- Number: 71
National team
| Years | Team | Apps | (Gls) |
| – | Slovenia | 28 | (46) |
Medal record
Mediterranean Games
| Bronze medal – third place | 2018 Tarragona | Team |

Ines Amon (born 13 July 1992) is a retired Slovenian handball player for RK Krim and the Slovenian national team.

She was selected to represent Slovenia at the 2017 World Women's Handball Championship.
