= Lea Krajnc =

Slovenian handball player (born 1993)

Personal information
- Nationality: Slovenian
- Born: 1 April 1993 (age 33) Koper, Slovenia
- Height: 1.75 m (5 ft 9 in)

Sport
- Sport: Handball
- Position: Left back
- Current club: RK Zagorje
- Number: 4
National team
Years	Team	Apps	(Gls)
–	Slovenia	25	(15)
Medal record
Mediterranean Games
Bronze medal – third place	2018 Tarragona	Team

Lea Krajnc (born 1 April 1993) is a Slovenian handball player for RK Zagorje and the Slovenian national team.

She participated at the 2016 European Women's Handball Championship.
