= Alena Stellnerová =

Czech handball player

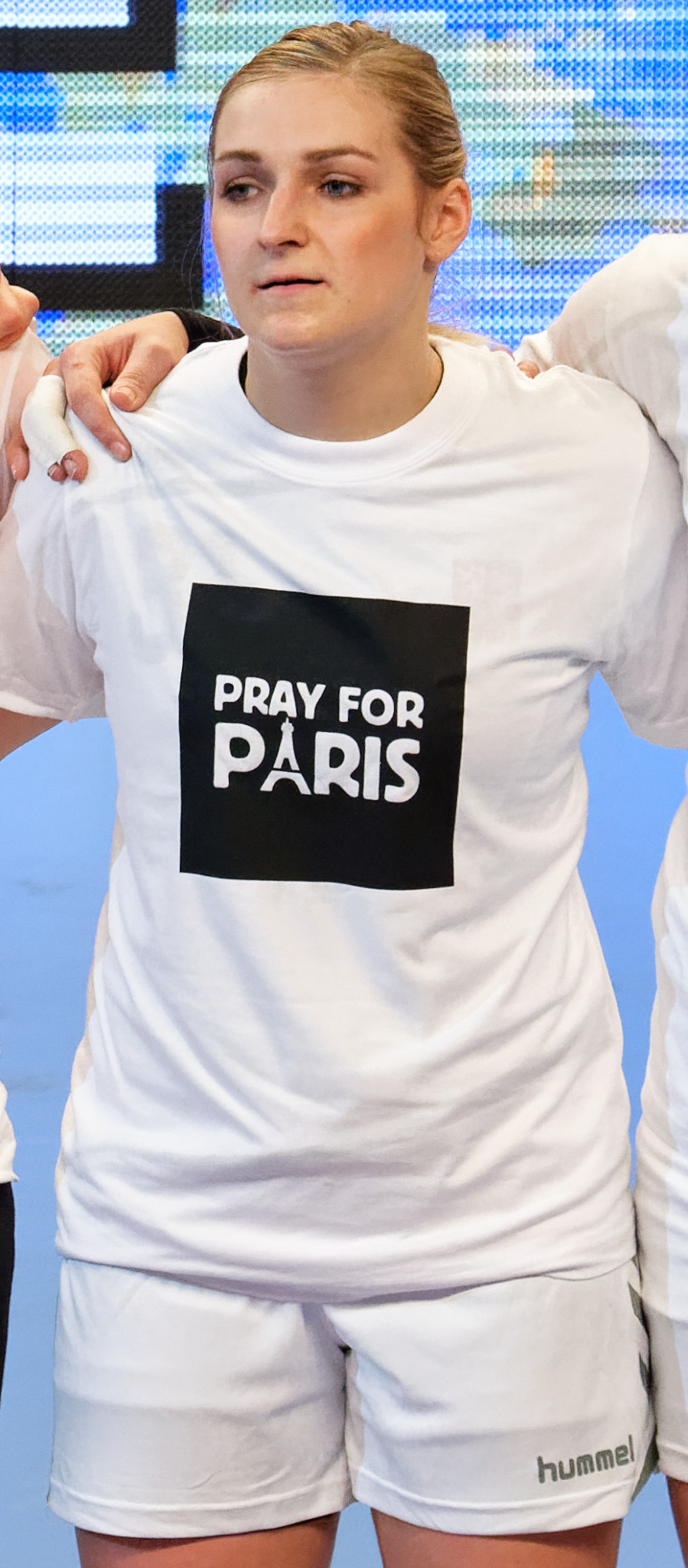

Personal information
- Full name: Alena Stellnerová
- Nationality: Czech
- Born: 22 August 1989 (age 37) Písek, Czechoslovakia
- Height: 1.70 m (5 ft 7 in)

Sport
- Sport: Handball
- Position: Pivot
- Current club: Sokol Písek
- Number: 73

Senior clubs
- Years: Team
- 2009–2012: Sokol Písek
- 2012–2018: DHC Slavia Prague
- 2018–: Sokol Písek
National team
Years	Team	Apps	(Gls)
2016–	Czech Republic	85	(74)
- Updated on 23 April 2024

Alena Stellnerová (born 22 August 1989) is a Czech handballer for Sokol Písek and the Czech national team.

She participated at the 2018 European Women's Handball Championship.
