= Yuliya Andriychuk =

Ukrainian handball player (born 1992)

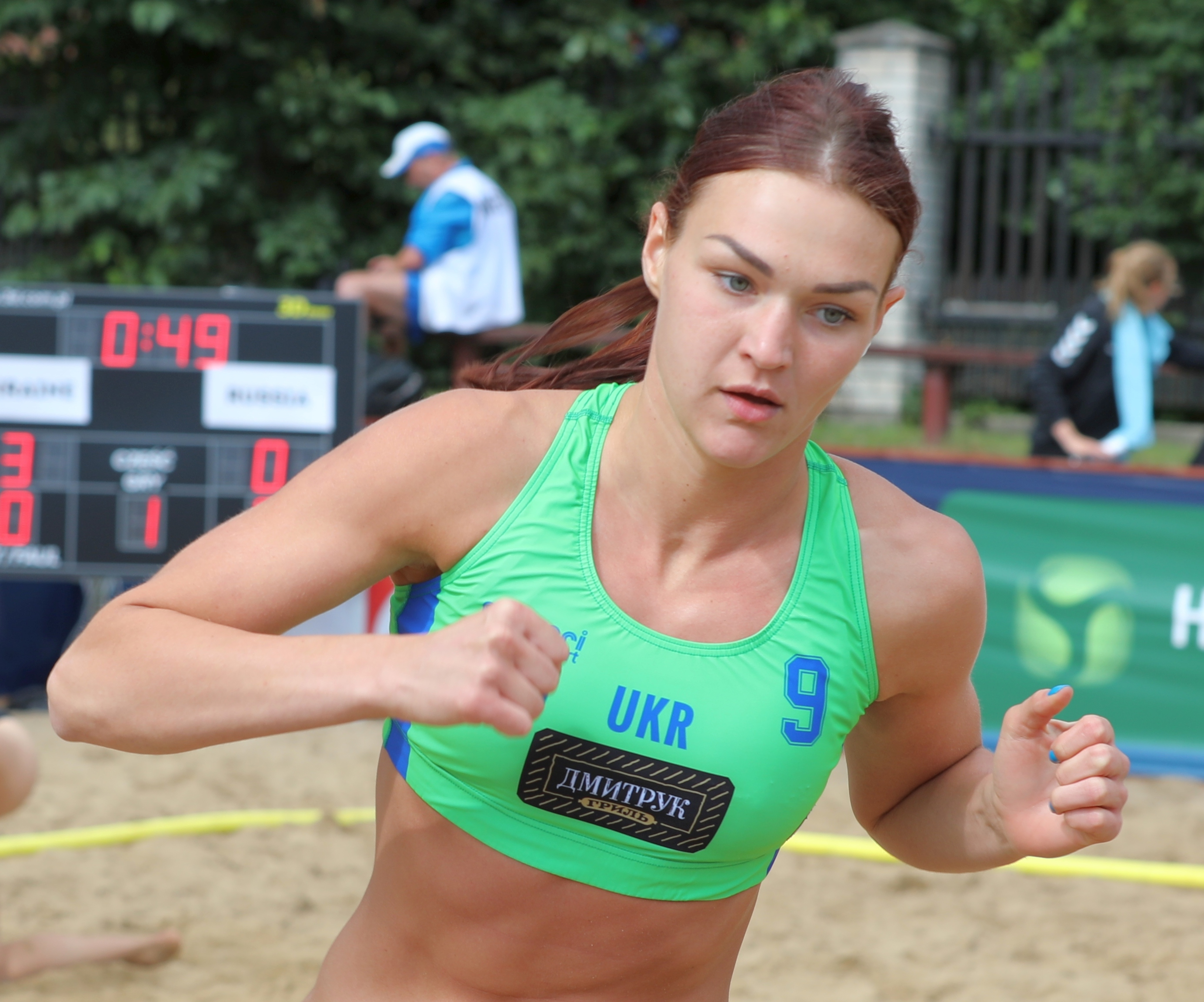

Personal information
- Full name: Юлія Андрійчук
- Nationality: Ukrainian
- Born: 17 May 1992 (age 34) Kyiv, Ukraine
- Height: 1.85 m (6 ft 1 in)

Sport
- Sport: Handball
- Position: Left back
- Current club: Ardeşen GSK
- Number: 69

Senior clubs
- Years: Team
- 2008–2010: Podatkova-Istil
- 2010–2012: Podatkova University
- 2013–2014: HC Lada Togliatti
- 2014–2015: HC Gomel
- 2015–: Ardeşen GSK
National team
- Years: Team
- –: Ukraine

Yuliya Andriychuk (Ukrainian: Юлія Андрійчук; born 17 May 1992) is a Ukrainian handballer playing in the Turkish Women's Handball Super League for Ardeşen GSK. She played for Ukrainian national team. The 1.85 m (6 ft 1 in) sportswoman plays in the left back position.

== Career ==
Andriychuk played in her country for Podatkova-Istil (2008–2010) and Podatkova University (2010–2012) before she moved to Russia to join HC Lada Togliatti (2013–2014). After one season, she moved to the Belarusian team HC Gomel (2014–2015). In July 2015, she transferred to Ardeşen GSK in Rize, Turkey to play in the Turkish Women's Super League.

She was member of the Ukraine women's national beach handball team at the 2013 and 2019 European Beach Handball Championship.

She took part at the 2014 European Women's Handball Championship qualification.
