= Stella Kramer =

German handball player (born 1989)

Personal information
- Nationality: German
- Born: 22 March 1989 (age 37) Herdecke, Germany
- Height: 1.65 m (5 ft 5 in)

Sport
- Sport: Handball
- Position: Right wing
- Current club: PSV Recklinghausen
- Number: 3

Senior clubs
- Years: Team
- –: SSV Marienheide
- –2006: TV Strombach
- 2006–2007: HSG Blomberg-Lippe
- 2007–2009: TV Beyeröhde
- 2009–2018: Borussia Dortmund Handball
- 2019-: PSV Recklinghausen
National team
Years	Team	Apps	(Gls)
2016–	Germany	20	(21)
- Updated on 29 September 2022

Stella Kramer (born 22 March 1989) is a German handball player for PSV Recklinghausen and the German national team.

She was part of the team at the 2016 European Women's Handball Championship.
