= Lois Abbingh =

Dutch handball player (born 1992)

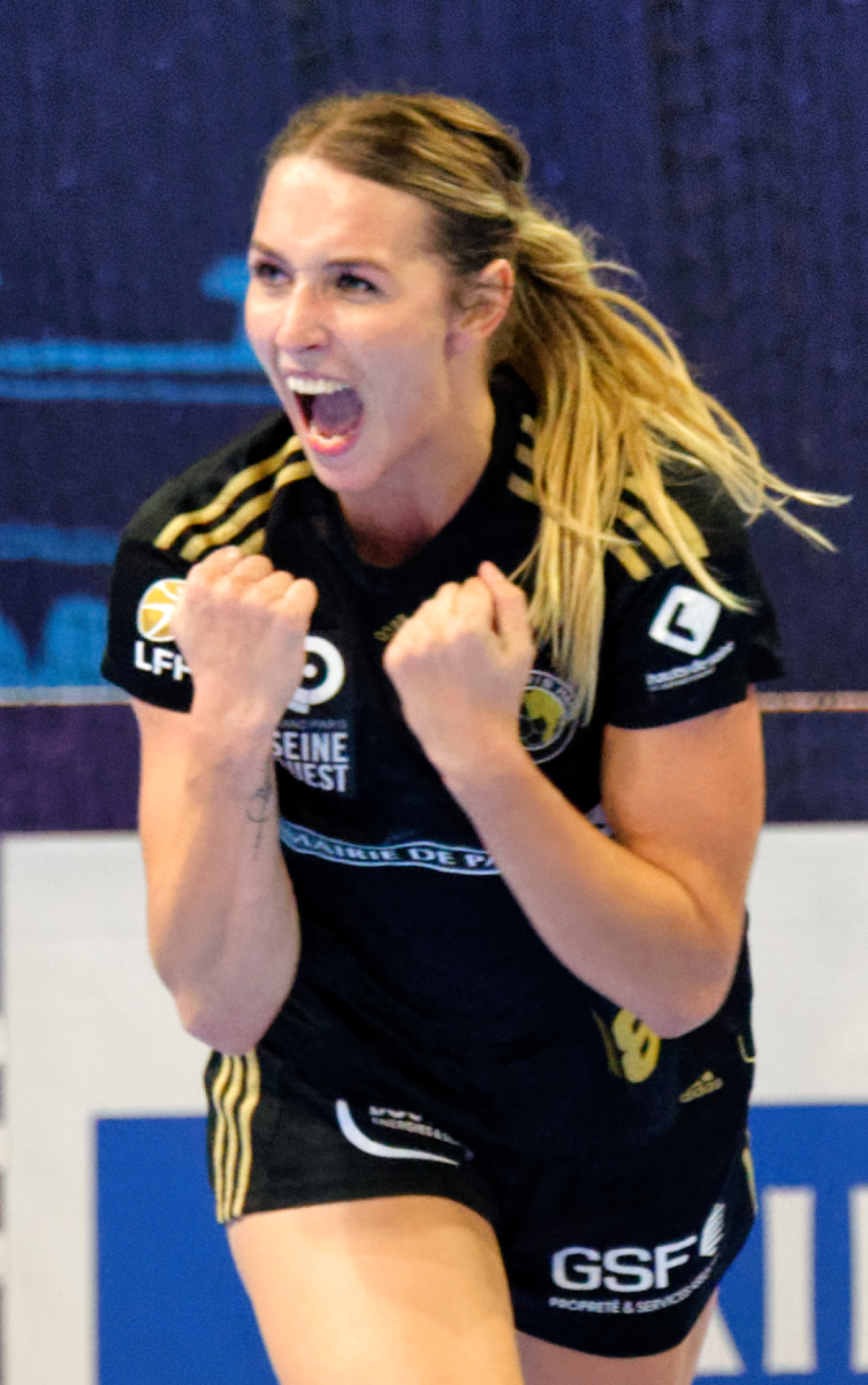
- Lois Abbingh with Issy Paris Hand in April 2017

Personal information
- Nationality: Dutch
- Born: 13 August 1992 (age 34) Groningen, Netherlands
- Height: 1.77 m (5 ft 10 in)

Sport
- Sport: Handball
- Position: Left back
- Current club: Borussia Dortmund Handball
- Number: 5

Senior clubs
- Years: Team
- –: V&S Groningen
- 2009–2010: E&O Emmen
- 2010–2014: VfL Oldenburg
- 2014–2016: HCM Baia Mare
- 2016–2018: Issy Paris Hand
- 2018–2020: Rostov-Don
- 2020–2023: Odense Håndbold
- 2023–01/2025: Vipers Kristiansand
- 02/2025–06/2026: Borussia Dortmund Handball
National team
Years	Team	Apps	(Gls)
2010–2025	Netherlands	241	(930)
Medal record
World Championship
Gold medal – first place	2019 Japan
Silver medal – second place	2015 Denmark
Bronze medal – third place	2017 Germany
European Championship
Silver medal – second place	2016 Sweden
Bronze medal – third place	2018 France
European Junior Championship
Silver medal – second place	2011 Netherlands

Lois Abbingh (born 13 August 1992) is a Dutch handball player who plays for Borussia Dortmund Handball and the Dutch national team. She was a part the Netherlands team that won the 2019 World Women's Handball Championship; the first title in the country's history.

== Career ==
Abbingh started playing handball at V&S Groningen.

In 2009 she joined E&O Emmen, where she was the top scorer in the Eredivisie in the 2009–10 season. This prompted a move to the German Bundesliga side VfL Oldenburg. Here she won the 2012 DHB-Pokal in 2012.

In 2014 she joined Romanian HCM Baia Mare. Here she played for two years, where she won the Romanian cup in 2015, before joining French Issy Paris Hand. In 2018 she joined Rostov-Don. Here she won the 2019 and 2020 Russian championship.

In 2020 she joined Danish side Odense Håndbold. Here she won the Danish championship in 2021 and 2022 and the Danish Cup in 2020 in a team, that featured many Dutch national team player including among other Larissa Nüsser and Dione Housheer.

In March 2022 she took a break from handball due to maternity leave.

In 2023 she joined Norwegian side Vipers Kristiansand. In her first season at the club she won the Norwegian championship and the Norwegian cup. When she club went bankrupt in January 2025, she joined German side Borussia Dortmund Handball on a 1.5 year contract.

=== National team ===
In 2011, she was a key player of the Dutch team that reached the final of the Women's 19 European Championship, just to fell short against Denmark in a close battle to 27–29. Abbingh scored 65 goals in the tournament and won the top scorer's award.

She represented the Netherlands in six World Women's Handball Championship (winning a silver in Denmark 2015, a bronze in Germany 2017, and winning gold in Japan 2019), in four European Women's Handball Championship (winning a silver in Sweden 2016) and two editions of the Olympic Games (finishing fourth in Rio 2016 and fifth in Tokyo 2020). At the World Championship in 2017 she became a member of the All-Star team (as the best Left Back of the competition) and she was among the top goalscorers, ranking second with her 58 goals scored.

She was a part of the Dutch team at the 2019 World Championship in Japan, where Netherlands won gold medals, beating Spain in the final 30:29 In the final of the 2019 World Championship she scored the winning goal for the Netherlands, when she converted a penalty to make it 30:29 with seconds to go. She was the top scorer at the tournament with 71 goals and a conversion of 62%.

She competed at the 2020 Summer Olympics where the Netherlands finished 5th.

At the 2024 Olympics she was chosen as the Dutch flag bearer together with the basketball player Worthy de Jong. The Netherlands finished 5th for a second Olympics in a row.

In November 2025 she announced her intention to retire from the national team after the 2025 World Championship, together with Estavana Polman.

== Achievements ==
- DHB-Pokal:
  - Winner: 2012
- Baia Mare Champions Trophy:
  - Winner: 2014
- Cupa României:
  - Winner: 2015
- Russian Championship
  - Winner: 2019, 2020
- Danish Handball League:
  - Winner: 2021, 2022
- Danish Handball Cup:
  - Winner: 2020
- Norwegian League:
  - Winner: 2023/2024
- Norwegian Cup:
  - Winner: 2023/24

== Awards and recognition ==
- Eredivisie Top Scorer: 2010
- Top-Scorer of the European Junior Championship: 2011
- All-Star Left Back of the World Championship: 2017
- Top-Scorer of the World Championship: 2019
- Handball-Planet.com All-Star Left Back of the Year: 2019
- MVP of the Danish handball Cup 2020

== Gallery ==
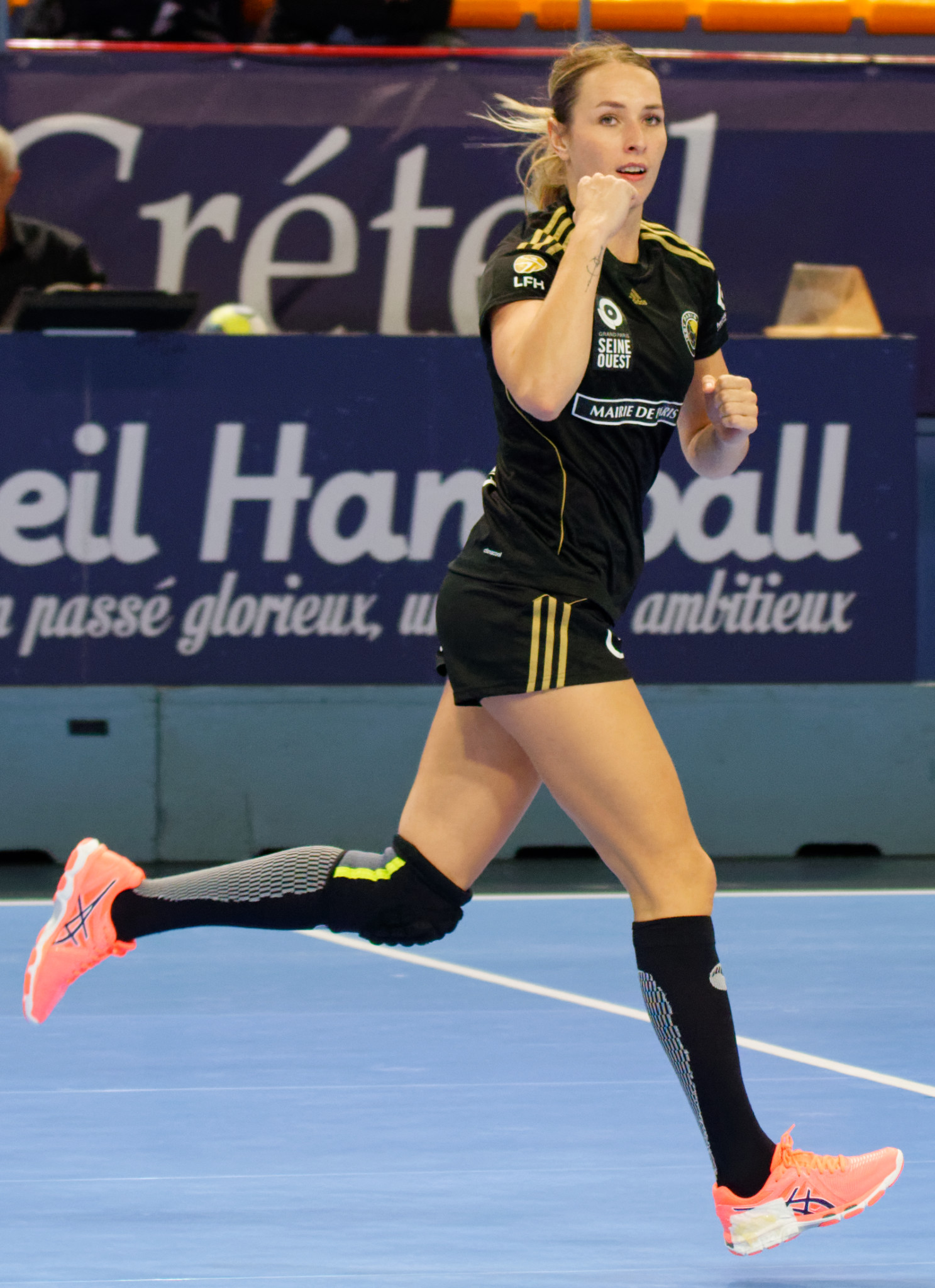

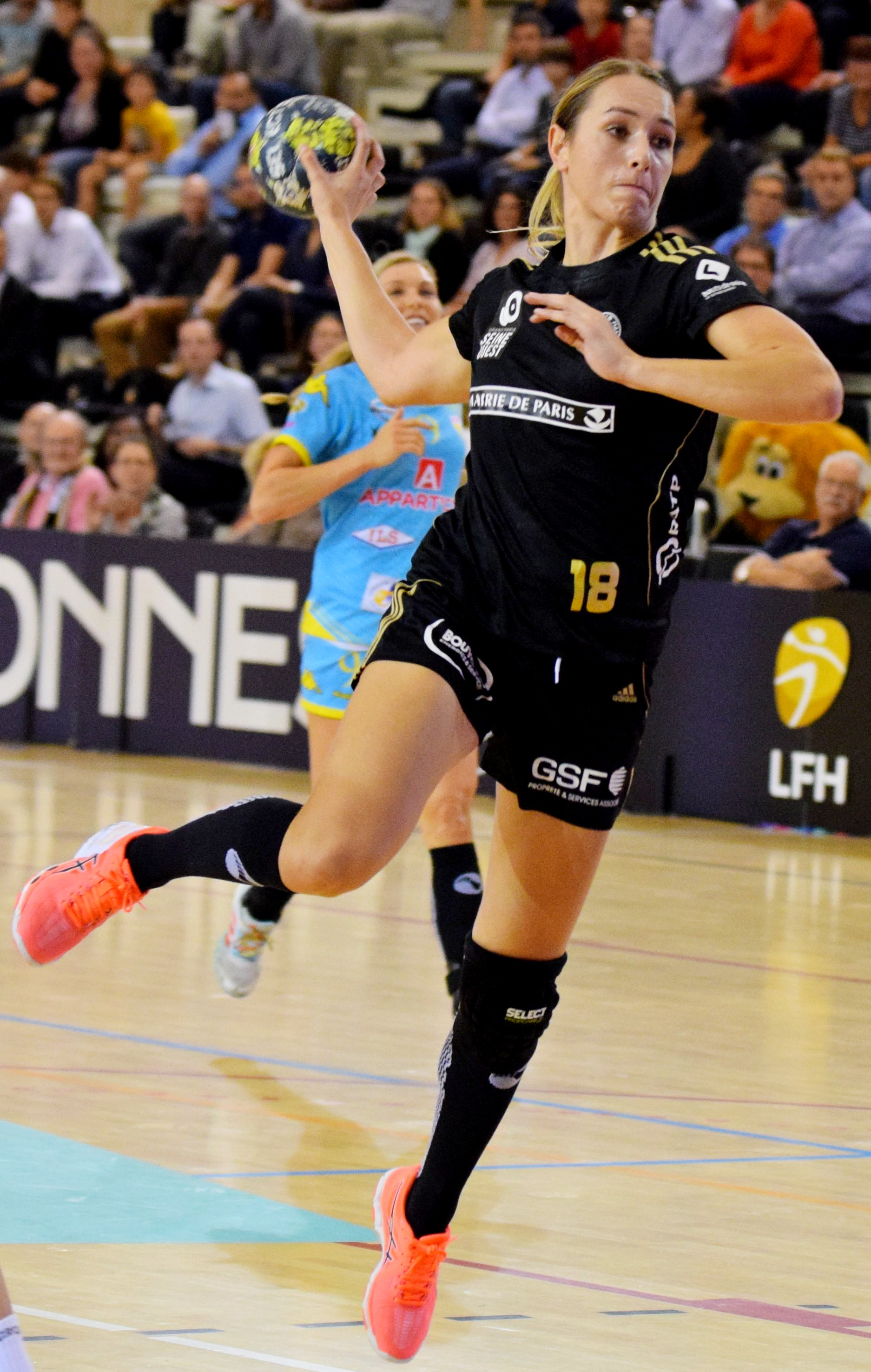

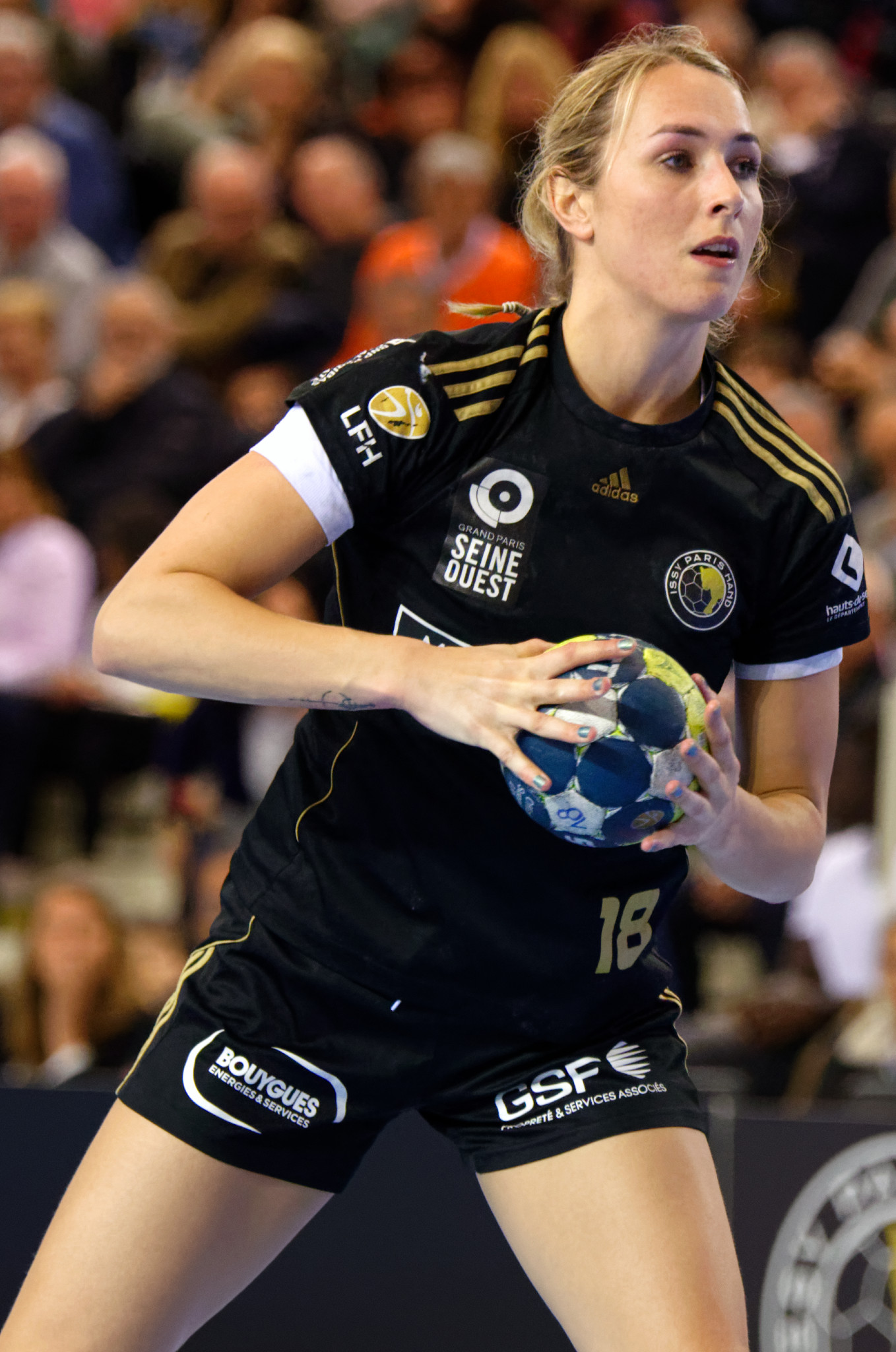

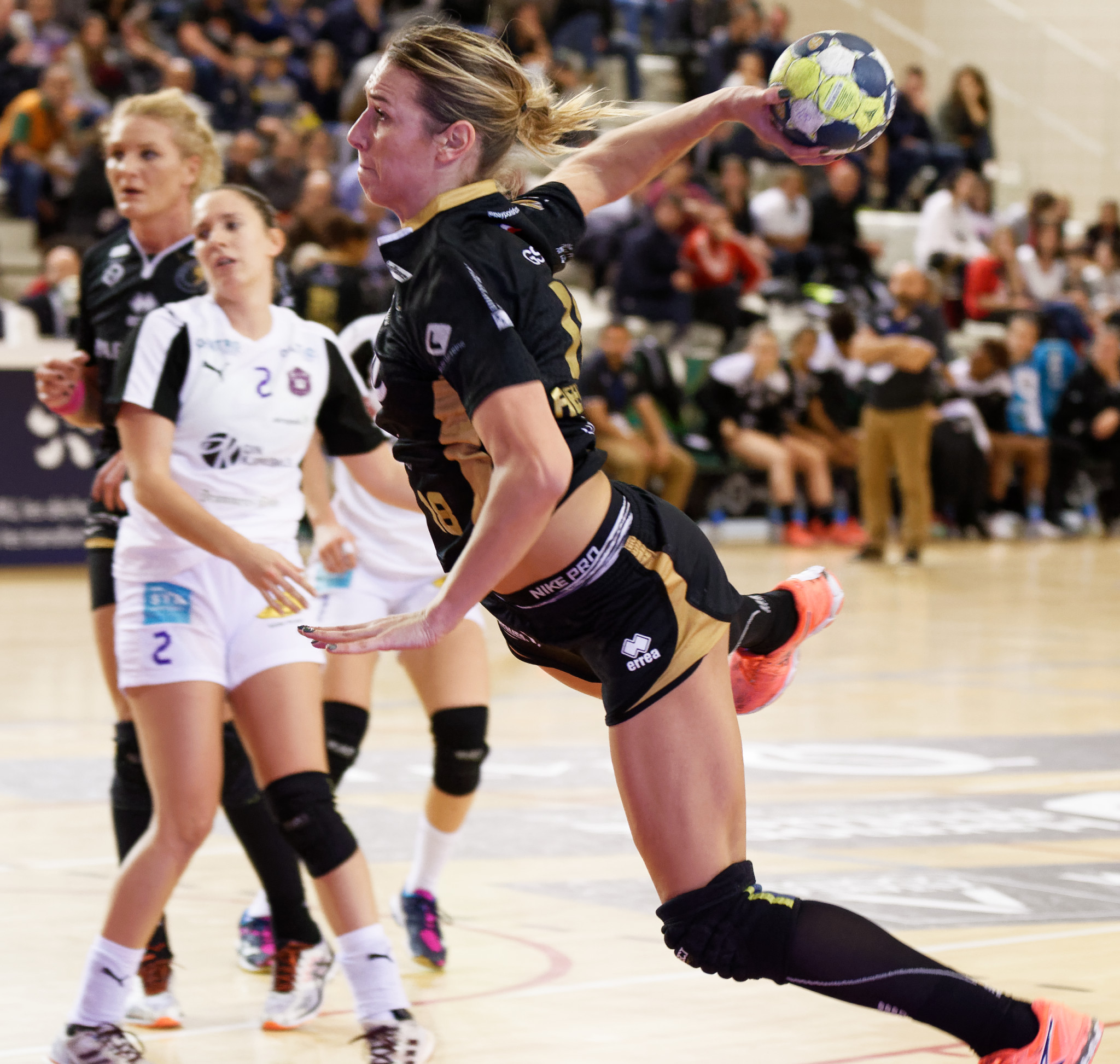

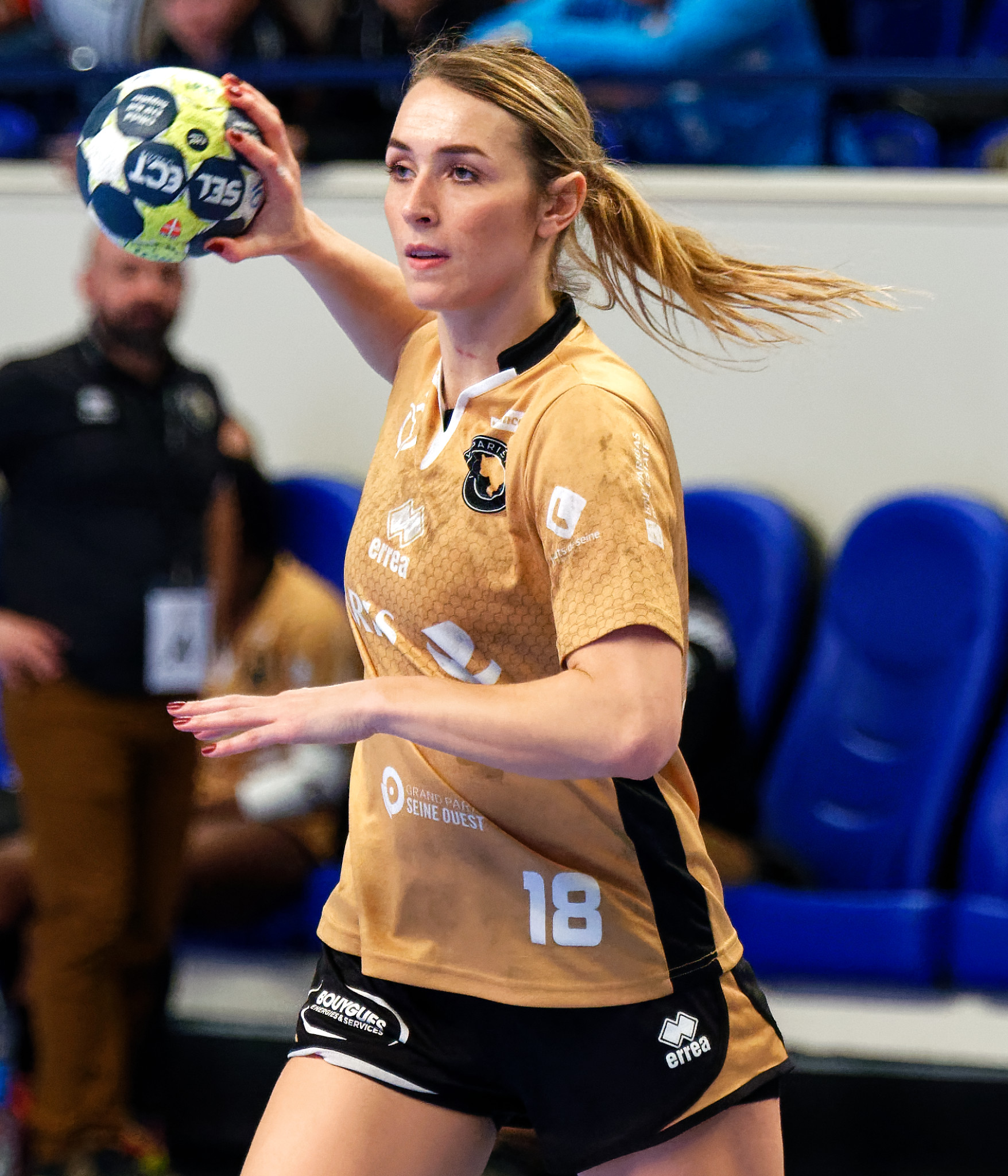

Olympic Games
Preceded by Irene Schouten	Flag bearer for the Netherlands; 2024 opening ceremony With: Worthy de Jong	Succeeded by Femke Bol; Harrie Lavreysen
