= Kamila Szczecina =

Polish handball player (born 1987)

Personal information
- Nationality: Polish
- Born: 31 October 1987 (age 38) Nowy Sącz, Poland
- Height: 1.74 m (5 ft 8 1/2 in)

Sport
- Sport: Handball
- Position: Pivot
- Current club: Pogoń Szczecin
- Number: 7
National team
Years	Team	Apps	(Gls)
–	Poland	5	(11)

Kamila Szczecina (born 21 October 1987) is a Polish handball player for Pogoń Szczecin and the Polish national team.

She participated at the 2016 European Women's Handball Championship.
