= Helena Ryšánková =

Czech handball player

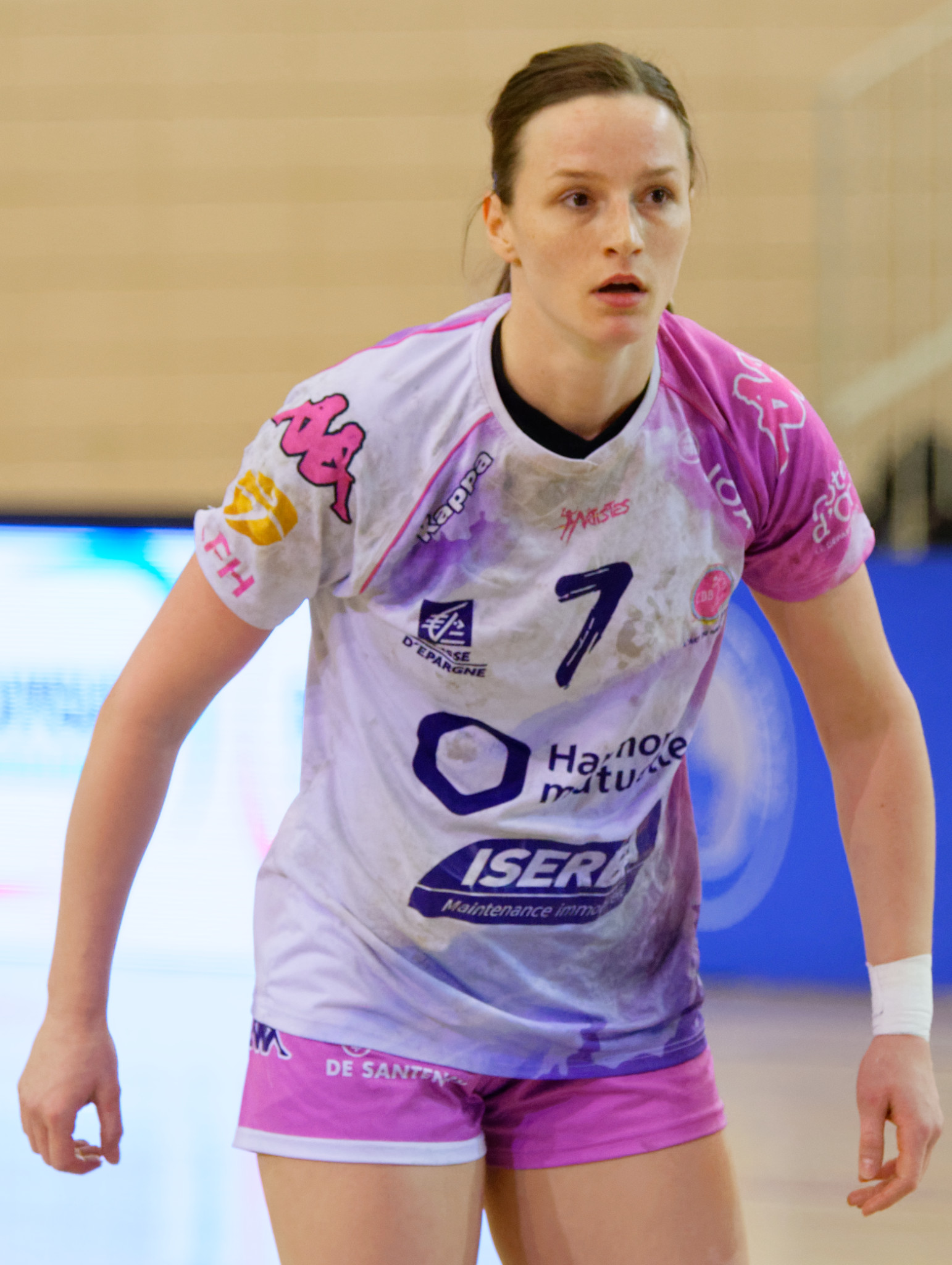
- Ryšánková in 2018

Personal information
- Nationality: Czech
- Born: 19 November 1992 (age 33) Prague, Czechoslovakia
- Height: 1.75 m (5 ft 9 in)

Sport
- Sport: Handball
- Position: Right back
- Current club: CS Minaur Baia Mare
- Number: 7

Senior clubs
- Years: Team
- 2011–2015: DHK Banik Most
- 2015–2016: DHC Sokol Poruba
- 2016–2017: Stella Saint-Maur Handball
- 2017–2018: Cercle Dijon Bourgogne
- 2018–: CS Minaur Baia Mare
National team
Years	Team	Apps	(Gls)
2015–	Czech Republic	46	(66)

Helena Ryšánková (born 19 November 1992), also known as Helena Aspridu, is a Czech handballer for CS Minaur Baia Mare.

She participated at the 2018 European Women's Handball Championship.

== Achievements ==
- Czech First Division:
  - Winner: 2013, 2014, 2015
- EHF Challenge Cup:
  - Winner: 2013
