= Polona Barič =

Slovenian handball player

Personal information
- Nationality: Slovenian
- Born: 15 May 1992 (age 34) Izola, Slovenia
- Height: 1.66 m (5 ft 5 in)

Sport
- Sport: Handball
- Position: Left wing
- Current club: Retired

Senior clubs
- Years: Team
- -2020: RK Krim
National team
Years	Team	Apps	(Gls)
–	Slovenia	45	(62)

Polona Barič (born 15 May 1992) is a retired Slovenian handballer who played for RK Krim and the Slovenian women's national team.

She participated at the 2018 European Women's Handball Championship.
