= Maria Adler =

Swedish handball player (born 1992)

Personal information
- Full name: Maria Charlotte Alexandra Adler
- Nationality: Swedish
- Born: 28 May 1992 (age 34) Lund, Sweden
- Height: 1.82 m (6 ft 0 in)

Sport
- Sport: Handball
- Position: Left back

Senior clubs
- Years: Team
- 2009–2013: Lugi HF
- 2013–2017: Odense Håndbold
- 2017: RK Krim
- 2020: Lugi HF
National team
Years	Team	Apps	(Gls)
2012–2014	Sweden	12	(8)

Maria Adler (born 28 May 1992) is a retired Swedish handball player for the Swedish national team. She retired in 2017 while playing for Slovenian club RK Krim. In February 2020 she made a short comeback for Lugi HF.
