= Amanda Kolczynski =

French handball player (born 1993)

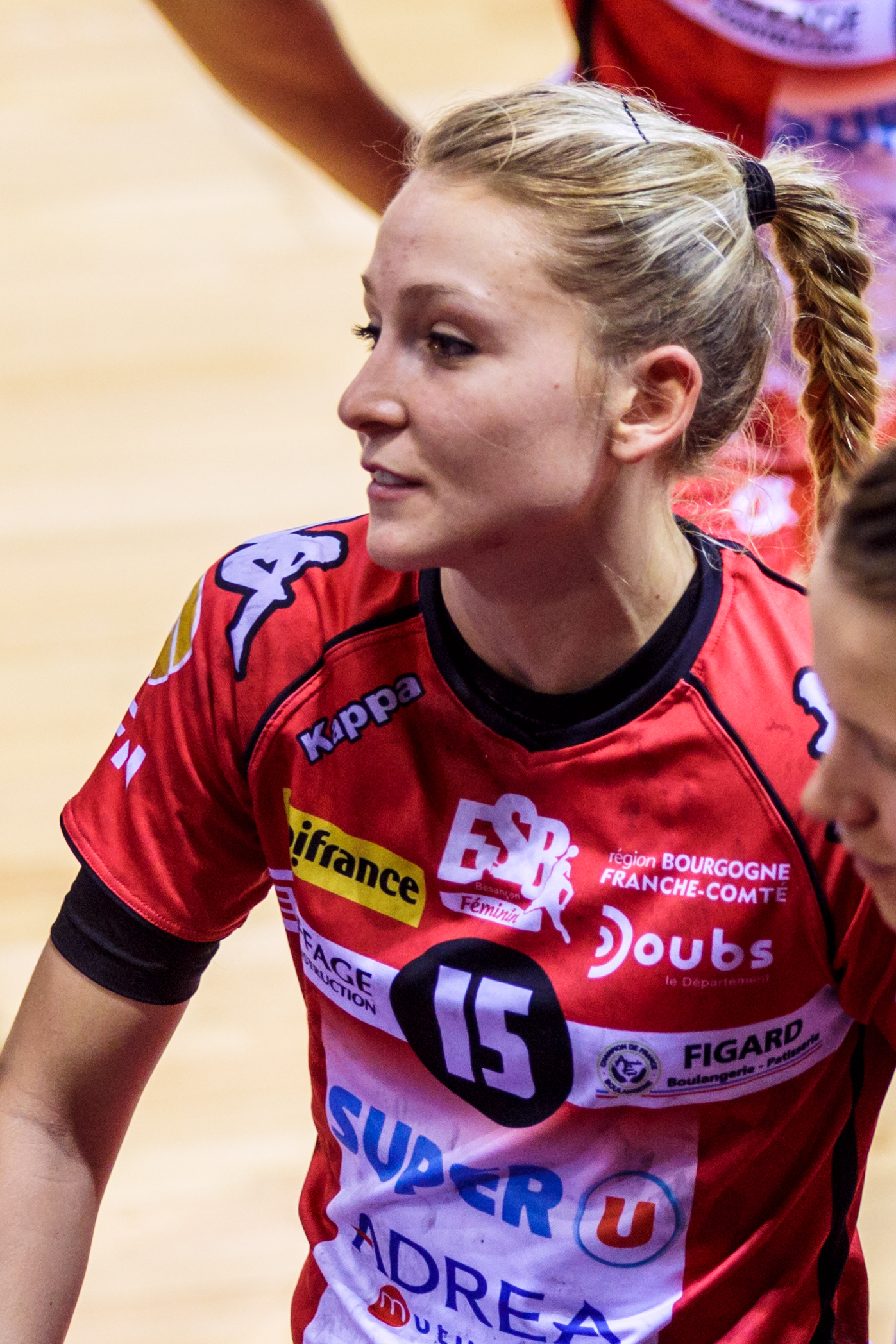

Personal information
- Nationality: French
- Born: 10 August 1993 (age 33) Angers, France
- Height: 1.70 m (5 ft 7 in)

Sport
- Sport: Handball
- Position: Right wing
- Current club: Saint-Amand Handball
- Number: 15

Senior clubs
- Years: Team
- 2012–2020: ESBF Besançon
- 2020–: Saint-Amand Handball
National team
Years	Team	Apps	(Gls)
2015–	France	11	(7)
Medal record
European Championship
Bronze medal – third place	2016 Sweden

Amanda Kolczynski (born 10 August 1993) is a French handballer for Saint-Amand Handball and the France national team.

== Individual awards ==
- All-Star Right Wing of the Championnat de France: 2016
- French Championship Best Right Wing: 2016
