= Fie Woller =

Danish handball player (born 1992)

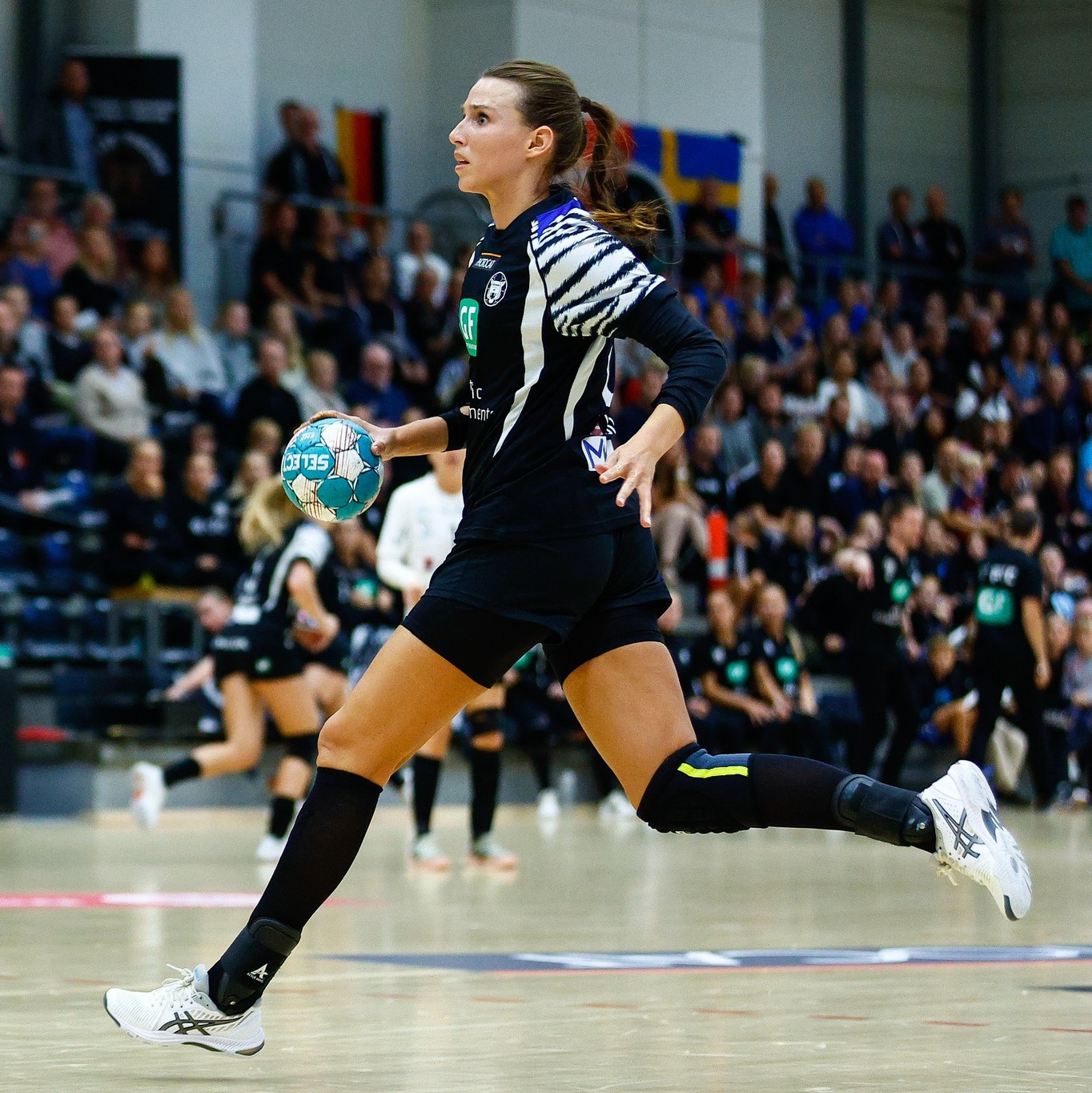
- Woller in 2023

Personal information
- Nationality: Danish
- Born: 17 September 1992 (age 34) Herning, Denmark
- Height: 1.76 m (5 ft 9 in)

Sport
- Sport: Handball
- Position: Left wing
- Current club: CSM Corona Brașov

Senior clubs
- Years: Team
- 2009–2016: FC Midtjylland
- 2016–2020: SG BBM Bietigheim
- 2020–2021: Bourg-de-Péage Drôme
- 2021–2022: Neptunes de Nantes
- 2022–2023: København Håndbold
- 2023: Rødovre HK
- 2023-: CSM Corona Brașov
National team
Years	Team	Apps	(Gls)
2011–2019	Denmark	65	(113)
Medal record
European Junior Championship
Gold medal – first place	2011 Netherlands
European Youth Championship
Gold medal – first place	2009 Serbia

Fie Woller (born 17 September 1992) is a Danish handball player for Romanian club CS Minaur Baia Mare and the Danish national team. She plays left wing, but can also cover on the left back position.

She is the twin sister of fellow handball player Cecilie Woller.
