= Patrycja Królikowska =

Polish handball player (born 1992)

Personal information
- Nationality: Polish
- Born: 15 May 1992 (age 34) Łódź, Poland
- Height: 1.60 m (5 ft 3 in)

Sport
- Sport: Handball
- Position: Right wing
- Current club: Vistal Gdynia
- Number: 14
National team
Years	Team	Apps	(Gls)
–	Poland	13	(16)

Patrycja Królikowska (born 15 May 1992) is a Polish handball player for Vistal Gdynia and the Polish national team.

She participated at the 2016 European Women's Handball Championship.
