= RŽK Zagorje =

Slovenian handball club

- Full name: Rokometni ženski klub Zagorje
- Founded: 1953; 72 years ago (original); 2019; 6 years ago (refounded)
- Arena: Zagorje Sports Hall

Rokometni ženski klub Zagorje (English: Zagorje Women's Handball Club) or simply RŽK Zagorje is a women's handball club from Zagorje ob Savi, Slovenia. Zagorje has won the Slovenian First League once, in 2016.

== Honours ==
- Slovenian Championship

Winners: 2016

== European record ==
All results list Zagorje's goal tally first.

Season	Competition	Round	Club	1st leg	2nd leg	Aggregate
2016–17	EHF Cup	R1	(Norway) Byåsen HE	20–32	20–25	40–57
