= 2013–14 EHF Women's Champions League group stages =

This article describes the group stage of the 2013–14 EHF Women's Champions League.

== Format ==
The 16 teams were split into four groups, consisting of four teams. Each team played a home and away game against all opponents in the group. The first two ranked teams advance to the main round where the same format was used to determine the final four participants.

== Group matches ==
=== Seedings ===
The draw of the group matches was held on 28 July in Vienna. A total of sixteen teams were concerned in the process, to be divided into four pots of four. Teams are divided into four pots, based on EHF coefficients. Clubs from the same pot or the same association could not be drawn into the same group.

| Pot 1 | Pot 2 | Pot 3 | Pot 4 |
|---|---|---|---|
| (Hungary) Győri Audi ETO KC (Norway) Larvik HK (Montenegro) ŽRK Budućnost Podgorica (Slovenia) Krim Ljubljana | (Spain) BM Bera Bera (Denmark) FC Midtjylland Håndbold (Germany) Thüringer HC (France) Metz Handball | (Austria) Hypo Niederösterreich (Croatia) RK Podravka Koprivnica (Sweden) IK Sävehof (Poland) SPR Lublin SSA | (Germany) Handball Club Leipzig (Hungary) FTC-Rail Cargo Hungaria (Romania) HCM Baia Mare (North Macedonia) ŽRK Vardar |

=== Group A ===
| Team | Pld | W | D | L | GF | GA | GD | Pts |
|---|---|---|---|---|---|---|---|---|
| (Hungary) Győri Audi ETO KC | 6 | 6 | 0 | 0 | 192 | 143 | +49 | 12 |
| (Germany) Thüringer HC | 6 | 2 | 0 | 4 | 159 | 165 | −6 | 4 |
| (Austria) Hypo Niederösterreich | 6 | 2 | 0 | 4 | 149 | 170 | −21 | 4 |
| (Romania) HCM Baia Mare | 6 | 2 | 0 | 4 | 140 | 162 | −22 | 4 |

| 5 October 2013; 18:30 | Győri Audi ETO KC (Hungary) | 41 – 22 | (Austria) Hypo Niederösterreich | Magvassy Mihály Sportcsarnok, Győr; Attendance: 1,800; Referees: Pavićević, Ražnatović (MNE) |
| 5 October 2013; 18:30 | Løke 6 | (21–11) | do Nascimento 8 | Magvassy Mihály Sportcsarnok, Győr; Attendance: 1,800; Referees: Pavićević, Ražnatović (MNE) |
| 5 October 2013; 18:30 | 3× (yellow card) 1× (suspension) | Report | 3× (yellow card) 2× (suspension) | Magvassy Mihály Sportcsarnok, Győr; Attendance: 1,800; Referees: Pavićević, Ražnatović (MNE) |

| 6 October 2013; 15:00 | Thüringer HC (Germany) | 36 – 29 | (Romania) HCM Baia Mare | Wiedigsburghalle, Nordhausen; Attendance: 1,800; Referees: Arntsen, Röen (NOR) |
| 6 October 2013; 15:00 | Frey 10 | (18–15) | Geiger, Tătar 7 | Wiedigsburghalle, Nordhausen; Attendance: 1,800; Referees: Arntsen, Röen (NOR) |
| 6 October 2013; 15:00 | 2× (yellow card) 3× (suspension) | Report | 3× (yellow card) 3× (suspension) | Wiedigsburghalle, Nordhausen; Attendance: 1,800; Referees: Arntsen, Röen (NOR) |

| 12 October 2013; 19:00 | HCM Baia Mare (Romania) | 21 – 33 | (Hungary) Győri Audi ETO KC | Sala Sporturilor Lascăr Pană, Baia Mare; Attendance: 2,000; Referees: Brunovský, Čanda (SVK) |
| 12 October 2013; 19:00 | Tătar 5 | (10–16) | Løke 9 | Sala Sporturilor Lascăr Pană, Baia Mare; Attendance: 2,000; Referees: Brunovský, Čanda (SVK) |
| 12 October 2013; 19:00 | 2× (yellow card) 3× (suspension) | Report | 3× (yellow card) 5× (suspension) | Sala Sporturilor Lascăr Pană, Baia Mare; Attendance: 2,000; Referees: Brunovský, Čanda (SVK) |

| 13 October 2013; 20:25 | Hypo Niederösterreich (Austria) | 29 – 23 | (Germany) Thüringer HC | Bundessport- und Freizeitzentrum Südstadt, Maria Enzersdorf; Attendance: 600; Referees: Bonaventura, Bonaventura (FRA) |
| 13 October 2013; 20:25 | do Nascimento 9 | (14–13) | Barbosa 7 | Bundessport- und Freizeitzentrum Südstadt, Maria Enzersdorf; Attendance: 600; Referees: Bonaventura, Bonaventura (FRA) |
| 13 October 2013; 20:25 | 3× (yellow card) 3× (suspension) | Report | 2× (yellow card) 4× (suspension) 1× (red card) | Bundessport- und Freizeitzentrum Südstadt, Maria Enzersdorf; Attendance: 600; Referees: Bonaventura, Bonaventura (FRA) |

| 19 October 2013; 17:00 | HCM Baia Mare (Romania) | 24 – 23 | (Austria) Hypo Niederösterreich | Sala Sporturilor Lascăr Pană, Baia Mare; Attendance: 2,080; Referees: Alpaidze, Berezkina (RUS) |
| 19 October 2013; 17:00 | Nechita 6 | (8–12) | three players 6 | Sala Sporturilor Lascăr Pană, Baia Mare; Attendance: 2,080; Referees: Alpaidze, Berezkina (RUS) |
| 19 October 2013; 17:00 | 3× (yellow card) 2× (suspension) | Report | 2× (yellow card) 2× (suspension) | Sala Sporturilor Lascăr Pană, Baia Mare; Attendance: 2,080; Referees: Alpaidze, Berezkina (RUS) |

| 20 October 2013; 16:00 | Thüringer HC (Germany) | 25 – 33 | (Hungary) Győri Audi ETO KC | Wiedigsburghalle, Nordhausen; Attendance: 2,000; Referees: Nikolov, Nachevski (MKD) |
| 20 October 2013; 16:00 | Frey, Gros 6 | (12–20) | Görbicz 11 | Wiedigsburghalle, Nordhausen; Attendance: 2,000; Referees: Nikolov, Nachevski (MKD) |
| 20 October 2013; 16:00 | 3× (yellow card) 1× (suspension) | Report | 3× (yellow card) 1× (suspension) | Wiedigsburghalle, Nordhausen; Attendance: 2,000; Referees: Nikolov, Nachevski (MKD) |

| 2 November 2013; 19:30 | Győri Audi ETO KC (Hungary) | 29 – 22 | (Germany) Thüringer HC | Magvassy Mihály Sportcsarnok, Győr; Attendance: 1,900; Referees: Nikolić, Stojković (SRB) |
| 2 November 2013; 19:30 | Bulatović 7 | (13–11) | Barbosa 8 | Magvassy Mihály Sportcsarnok, Győr; Attendance: 1,900; Referees: Nikolić, Stojković (SRB) |
| 2 November 2013; 19:30 | 3× (yellow card) 4× (suspension) | Report | 3× (yellow card) 6× (suspension) | Magvassy Mihály Sportcsarnok, Győr; Attendance: 1,900; Referees: Nikolić, Stojković (SRB) |

| 2 November 2013; 20:25 | Hypo Niederösterreich (Austria) | 23 – 20 | (Romania) HCM Baia Mare | Bundessport- und Freizeitzentrum Südstadt, Maria Enzersdorf; Attendance: 1,020; Referees: Poulsen, Mortensen (DEN) |
| 2 November 2013; 20:25 | do Nascimento 11 | (16–10) | Rudics 4 | Bundessport- und Freizeitzentrum Südstadt, Maria Enzersdorf; Attendance: 1,020; Referees: Poulsen, Mortensen (DEN) |
| 2 November 2013; 20:25 | 3× (yellow card) 5× (suspension) | Report | 3× (yellow card) 4× (suspension) | Bundessport- und Freizeitzentrum Südstadt, Maria Enzersdorf; Attendance: 1,020; Referees: Poulsen, Mortensen (DEN) |

| 10 November 2013; 18:00 | HCM Baia Mare (Romania) | 20 – 19 | (Germany) Thüringer HC | Sala Sporturilor Lascăr Pană, Baia Mare; Attendance: 2,080; Referees: Krstić, Ljubić (SLO) |
| 10 November 2013; 18:00 | Marin 10 | (10–11) | Nadgornaja 7 | Sala Sporturilor Lascăr Pană, Baia Mare; Attendance: 2,080; Referees: Krstić, Ljubić (SLO) |
| 10 November 2013; 18:00 | 3× (yellow card) 2× (suspension) | Report | 3× (yellow card) 5× (suspension) | Sala Sporturilor Lascăr Pană, Baia Mare; Attendance: 2,080; Referees: Krstić, Ljubić (SLO) |

| 10 November 2013; 20:05 | Hypo Niederösterreich (Austria) | 27 – 28 | (Hungary) Győri Audi ETO KC | Bundessport- und Freizeitzentrum Südstadt, Maria Enzersdorf; Attendance: 1,020; Referees: Arntsen, Röen (NOR) |
| 10 November 2013; 20:05 | do Nascimento 8 | (11–14) | Bulatović 9 | Bundessport- und Freizeitzentrum Südstadt, Maria Enzersdorf; Attendance: 1,020; Referees: Arntsen, Röen (NOR) |
| 10 November 2013; 20:05 | 3× (yellow card) 4× (suspension) | Report | 2× (yellow card) 2× (suspension) | Bundessport- und Freizeitzentrum Südstadt, Maria Enzersdorf; Attendance: 1,020; Referees: Arntsen, Röen (NOR) |

| 16 November 2013; 18:30 | Győri Audi ETO KC (Hungary) | 28 – 26 | (Romania) HCM Baia Mare | Magvassy Mihály Sportcsarnok, Győr; Attendance: 1,900; Referees: Baranowski, Lemanowicz (POL) |
| 16 November 2013; 18:30 | Bulatović 7 | (14–14) | Geiger 7 | Magvassy Mihály Sportcsarnok, Győr; Attendance: 1,900; Referees: Baranowski, Lemanowicz (POL) |
| 16 November 2013; 18:30 | 3× (yellow card) 3× (suspension) | Report | 3× (yellow card) 4× (suspension) | Magvassy Mihály Sportcsarnok, Győr; Attendance: 1,900; Referees: Baranowski, Lemanowicz (POL) |

| 17 November 2013; 15:00 | Thüringer HC (Germany) | 34 – 25 | (Austria) Hypo Niederösterreich | Wiedigsburghalle, Nordhausen; Attendance: 2,208; Referees: Laurell, Engberg (SWE) |
| 17 November 2013; 15:00 | Wohlbold 8 | (17–11) | do Nascimento 8 | Wiedigsburghalle, Nordhausen; Attendance: 2,208; Referees: Laurell, Engberg (SWE) |
| 17 November 2013; 15:00 | 2× (yellow card) 5× (suspension) | Report | 3× (yellow card) 4× (suspension) | Wiedigsburghalle, Nordhausen; Attendance: 2,208; Referees: Laurell, Engberg (SWE) |

=== Group B ===
| Team | Pld | W | D | L | GF | GA | GD | Pts |
|---|---|---|---|---|---|---|---|---|
| (Denmark) FC Midtjylland Håndbold | 6 | 5 | 0 | 1 | 156 | 139 | +17 | 10 |
| (Montenegro) ŽRK Budućnost Podgorica | 6 | 4 | 0 | 2 | 156 | 125 | +31 | 8 |
| (Hungary) FTC-Rail Cargo Hungaria | 6 | 3 | 0 | 3 | 162 | 161 | +1 | 6 |
| (Poland) SPR Lublin SSA | 6 | 0 | 0 | 6 | 140 | 189 | −49 | 0 |

| 6 October 2013; 17:00 | FC Midtjylland Håndbold (Denmark) | 32 – 23 | (Hungary) FTC-Rail Cargo Hungaria | Ikast-Brande Arena, Ikast; Attendance: 1,790; Referees: Florescu, Duţă (ROU) |
| 6 October 2013; 17:00 | four players 6 | (16–11) | Pena 8 | Ikast-Brande Arena, Ikast; Attendance: 1,790; Referees: Florescu, Duţă (ROU) |
| 6 October 2013; 17:00 | 3× (yellow card) 5× (suspension) | Report | 3× (yellow card) 7× (suspension) | Ikast-Brande Arena, Ikast; Attendance: 1,790; Referees: Florescu, Duţă (ROU) |

| 6 October 2013; 19:00 | ŽRK Budućnost Podgorica (Montenegro) | 31 – 19 | (Poland) SPR Lublin SSA | Morača Sports Center, Podgorica; Attendance: 3,000; Referees: Năstase, Stancu (ROU) |
| 6 October 2013; 19:00 | Miljanić-Petrovic 6 | (16–8) | Drabik, Wojtas 4 | Morača Sports Center, Podgorica; Attendance: 3,000; Referees: Năstase, Stancu (ROU) |
| 6 October 2013; 19:00 | 3× (yellow card) 3× (suspension) | Report | 3× (yellow card) 3× (suspension) | Morača Sports Center, Podgorica; Attendance: 3,000; Referees: Năstase, Stancu (ROU) |

| 12 October 2013; 20:00 | SPR Lublin SSA (Poland) | 24 – 25 | (Denmark) FC Midtjylland Håndbold | Hala Sportowo-Widowiskowa "Globus", Lublin; Attendance: 2,500; Referees: Brkić, Jusufhodžić (AUT) |
| 12 October 2013; 20:00 | Wojtas 6 | (14–13) | Jørgensen 8 | Hala Sportowo-Widowiskowa "Globus", Lublin; Attendance: 2,500; Referees: Brkić, Jusufhodžić (AUT) |
| 12 October 2013; 20:00 | 3× (yellow card) 1× (suspension) | Report | 3× (yellow card) 2× (suspension) | Hala Sportowo-Widowiskowa "Globus", Lublin; Attendance: 2,500; Referees: Brkić, Jusufhodžić (AUT) |

| 13 October 2013; 18:00 | FTC-Rail Cargo Hungaria (Hungary) | 27 – 25 | (Montenegro) ŽRK Budućnost Podgorica | OBO Aréna, Dabas; Attendance: 2,400; Referees: Gousko, Repkin (BLR) |
| 13 October 2013; 18:00 | Tomori 7 | (13–13) | Miljanić-Petrovic 8 | OBO Aréna, Dabas; Attendance: 2,400; Referees: Gousko, Repkin (BLR) |
| 13 October 2013; 18:00 | 3× (yellow card) 2× (suspension) | Report | 3× (yellow card) 3× (suspension) | OBO Aréna, Dabas; Attendance: 2,400; Referees: Gousko, Repkin (BLR) |

| 20 October 2013; 14:00 | FTC-Rail Cargo Hungaria (Hungary) | 40 – 25 | (Poland) SPR Lublin SSA | OBO Aréna, Dabas; Attendance: 2,400; Referees: Laurell, Engberg (SWE) |
| 20 October 2013; 14:00 | Kovacsicz 8 | (20–12) | Wojtas 11 | OBO Aréna, Dabas; Attendance: 2,400; Referees: Laurell, Engberg (SWE) |
| 20 October 2013; 14:00 | 3× (yellow card) 4× (suspension) | Report | 2× (yellow card) 3× (suspension) | OBO Aréna, Dabas; Attendance: 2,400; Referees: Laurell, Engberg (SWE) |

| 20 October 2013; 15:15 | FC Midtjylland Håndbold (Denmark) | 21 – 19 | (Montenegro) ŽRK Budućnost Podgorica | Ikast-Brande Arena, Ikast; Attendance: 2,020; Referees: Opava, Válek (CZE) |
| 20 October 2013; 15:15 | Jensen 8 | (8–11) | Neagu 6 | Ikast-Brande Arena, Ikast; Attendance: 2,020; Referees: Opava, Válek (CZE) |
| 20 October 2013; 15:15 | 2× (yellow card) 4× (suspension) | Report | 3× (yellow card) 8× (suspension) | Ikast-Brande Arena, Ikast; Attendance: 2,020; Referees: Opava, Válek (CZE) |

| 3 November 2013; 17:00 | ŽRK Budućnost Podgorica (Montenegro) | 22 – 15 | (Denmark) FC Midtjylland Håndbold | Morača Sports Center, Podgorica; Attendance: 4,000; Referees: Cohen, Peretz (ISR) |
| 3 November 2013; 17:00 | Knežević 8 | (12–10) | Jørgensen, Thorsgaard 4 | Morača Sports Center, Podgorica; Attendance: 4,000; Referees: Cohen, Peretz (ISR) |
| 3 November 2013; 17:00 | 3× (yellow card) 2× (suspension) | Report | 3× (yellow card) 2× (suspension) | Morača Sports Center, Podgorica; Attendance: 4,000; Referees: Cohen, Peretz (ISR) |

| 3 November 2013; 17:15 | SPR Lublin SSA (Poland) | 24 – 26 | (Hungary) FTC-Rail Cargo Hungaria | Hala Sportowo-Widowiskowa "Globus", Lublin; Attendance: 1,800; Referees: Tzaferopoulos, Bethmann (GRE) |
| 3 November 2013; 17:15 | Skrzyniarz 8 | (12–15) | Tomori 7 | Hala Sportowo-Widowiskowa "Globus", Lublin; Attendance: 1,800; Referees: Tzaferopoulos, Bethmann (GRE) |
| 3 November 2013; 17:15 | 2× (yellow card) 3× (suspension) | Report | 2× (yellow card) 3× (suspension) | Hala Sportowo-Widowiskowa "Globus", Lublin; Attendance: 1,800; Referees: Tzaferopoulos, Bethmann (GRE) |

| 9 November 2013; 16:00 | SPR Lublin SSA (Poland) | 22 – 30 | (Montenegro) ŽRK Budućnost Podgorica | Hala Sportowo-Widowiskowa "Globus", Lublin; Attendance: 1,600; Referees: Kolevski, Krkačev (MKD) |
| 9 November 2013; 16:00 | Mihdaliova 7 | (12–13) | Miljanić-Petrovic 8 | Hala Sportowo-Widowiskowa "Globus", Lublin; Attendance: 1,600; Referees: Kolevski, Krkačev (MKD) |
| 9 November 2013; 16:00 | 3× (yellow card) 3× (suspension) | Report | 3× (yellow card) 4× (suspension) | Hala Sportowo-Widowiskowa "Globus", Lublin; Attendance: 1,600; Referees: Kolevski, Krkačev (MKD) |

| 9 November 2013; 18:30 | FTC-Rail Cargo Hungaria (Hungary) | 25 – 26 | (Denmark) FC Midtjylland Håndbold | OBO Aréna, Dabas; Attendance: 1,800; Referees: Marić, Mašić (SRB) |
| 9 November 2013; 18:30 | Pena 8 | (10–13) | Groot 7 | OBO Aréna, Dabas; Attendance: 1,800; Referees: Marić, Mašić (SRB) |
| 9 November 2013; 18:30 | 3× (yellow card) | Report | 3× (yellow card) 4× (suspension) | OBO Aréna, Dabas; Attendance: 1,800; Referees: Marić, Mašić (SRB) |

| 17 November 2013; 13:15 | FC Midtjylland Håndbold (Denmark) | 37 – 26 | (Poland) SPR Lublin SSA | Ikast-Brande Arena, Ikast; Attendance: 1,830; Referees: Bonaventura, Bonaventura (FRA) |
| 17 November 2013; 13:15 | L. Jørgensen 9 | (20–13) | Majerek 5 | Ikast-Brande Arena, Ikast; Attendance: 1,830; Referees: Bonaventura, Bonaventura (FRA) |
| 17 November 2013; 13:15 | 3× (yellow card) 1× (suspension) | Report | 3× (yellow card) 3× (suspension) | Ikast-Brande Arena, Ikast; Attendance: 1,830; Referees: Bonaventura, Bonaventura (FRA) |

| 17 November 2013; 18:00 | ŽRK Budućnost Podgorica (Montenegro) | 29 – 21 | (Hungary) FTC-Rail Cargo Hungaria | Morača Sports Center, Podgorica; Attendance: 5,000; Referees: Stark, Stefan (ROU) |
| 17 November 2013; 18:00 | Ježić, Knežević 6 | (15–14) | Tomori 6 | Morača Sports Center, Podgorica; Attendance: 5,000; Referees: Stark, Stefan (ROU) |
| 17 November 2013; 18:00 | 2× (yellow card) | Report | 3× (yellow card) 5× (suspension) | Morača Sports Center, Podgorica; Attendance: 5,000; Referees: Stark, Stefan (ROU) |

=== Group C ===
| Team | Pld | W | D | L | GF | GA | GD | Pts |
|---|---|---|---|---|---|---|---|---|
| (Slovenia) Krim Ljubljana | 6 | 4 | 1 | 1 | 167 | 138 | +29 | 9 |
| (Sweden) IK Sävehof | 6 | 3 | 1 | 2 | 169 | 172 | −3 | 7 |
| (France) Metz Handball | 6 | 3 | 0 | 3 | 149 | 144 | +5 | 6 |
| (Germany) Handball Club Leipzig | 6 | 1 | 0 | 5 | 139 | 170 | −31 | 2 |

| 5 October 2013; 16:00 | Metz Handball (France) | 22 – 23 | (Germany) Handball Club Leipzig | Arènes de Metz, Metz; Attendance: 3,800; Referees: Brehmer, Skowronek (POL) |
| 5 October 2013; 16:00 | Broch, Liščević 4 | (11–13) | Kudłacz, Müller 5 | Arènes de Metz, Metz; Attendance: 3,800; Referees: Brehmer, Skowronek (POL) |
| 5 October 2013; 16:00 | 3× (yellow card) 2× (suspension) | Report | 3× (yellow card) 6× (suspension) | Arènes de Metz, Metz; Attendance: 3,800; Referees: Brehmer, Skowronek (POL) |

| 5 October 2013; 20:30 | Krim Ljubljana (Slovenia) | 36 – 28 | (Sweden) IK Sävehof | Arena Stožice, Ljubljana; Attendance: 2,000; Referees: Alpaidze, Berezkina (RUS) |
| 5 October 2013; 20:30 | Mavsar 9 | (14–12) | Fogelström 6 | Arena Stožice, Ljubljana; Attendance: 2,000; Referees: Alpaidze, Berezkina (RUS) |
| 5 October 2013; 20:30 | 2× (yellow card) 1× (suspension) | Report | 3× (yellow card) 2× (suspension) | Arena Stožice, Ljubljana; Attendance: 2,000; Referees: Alpaidze, Berezkina (RUS) |

| 12 October 2013; 16:00 | IK Sävehof (Sweden) | 32 – 30 | (France) Metz Handball | Partillebohallen, Partille; Attendance: 800; Referees: Marić, Mašić (SRB) |
| 12 October 2013; 16:00 | Oden 11 | (15–19) | Baudouin, Zaadi 6 | Partillebohallen, Partille; Attendance: 800; Referees: Marić, Mašić (SRB) |
| 12 October 2013; 16:00 | 3× (yellow card) 2× (suspension) | Report | 2× (yellow card) 3× (suspension) | Partillebohallen, Partille; Attendance: 800; Referees: Marić, Mašić (SRB) |

| 13 October 2013; 15:00 | Handball Club Leipzig (Germany) | 23 – 27 | (Slovenia) Krim Ljubljana | Leipzig Arena, Leipzig; Attendance: 3,691; Referees: Stoļarovs, Līcis (LAT) |
| 13 October 2013; 15:00 | Kudłacz 7 | (10–13) | Lazović-Varlec 7 | Leipzig Arena, Leipzig; Attendance: 3,691; Referees: Stoļarovs, Līcis (LAT) |
| 13 October 2013; 15:00 | 3× (yellow card) | Report | 3× (yellow card) 4× (suspension) | Leipzig Arena, Leipzig; Attendance: 3,691; Referees: Stoļarovs, Līcis (LAT) |

| 19 October 2013; 16:00 | Handball Club Leipzig (Germany) | 28 – 34 | (Sweden) IK Sävehof | Leipzig Arena, Leipzig; Attendance: 2,500; Referees: Sager, Styger (SUI) |
| 19 October 2013; 16:00 | Müller 8 | (15–18) | Oden 9 | Leipzig Arena, Leipzig; Attendance: 2,500; Referees: Sager, Styger (SUI) |
| 19 October 2013; 16:00 | 3× (yellow card) 4× (suspension) | Report | 5× (suspension) | Leipzig Arena, Leipzig; Attendance: 2,500; Referees: Sager, Styger (SUI) |

| 20 October 2013; 19:00 | Metz Handball (France) | 21 – 20 | (Slovenia) Krim Ljubljana | Arènes de Metz, Metz; Attendance: 4,053; Referees: Cohen, Peretz (ISR) |
| 20 October 2013; 19:00 | Baudouin, Kamto Njitam 4 | (12–7) | Irman 6 | Arènes de Metz, Metz; Attendance: 4,053; Referees: Cohen, Peretz (ISR) |
| 20 October 2013; 19:00 | 2× (yellow card) 4× (suspension) | Report | 3× (yellow card) 4× (suspension) | Arènes de Metz, Metz; Attendance: 4,053; Referees: Cohen, Peretz (ISR) |

| 2 November 2013; 20:30 | Krim Ljubljana (Slovenia) | 27 – 21 | (France) Metz Handball | Arena Stožice, Ljubljana; Attendance: 2,100; Referees: Gatelis, Mažeika (LTU) |
| 2 November 2013; 20:30 | Irman 7 | (13–11) | Baudouin 7 | Arena Stožice, Ljubljana; Attendance: 2,100; Referees: Gatelis, Mažeika (LTU) |
| 2 November 2013; 20:30 | 3× (yellow card) 3× (suspension) | Report | 3× (yellow card) 2× (suspension) | Arena Stožice, Ljubljana; Attendance: 2,100; Referees: Gatelis, Mažeika (LTU) |

| 3 November 2013; 18:00 | IK Sävehof (Sweden) | 30 – 23 | (Germany) Handball Club Leipzig | Partillebohallen, Partille; Attendance: 1,511; Referees: Andorka, Hucker (HUN) |
| 3 November 2013; 18:00 | Oden 8 | (14–13) | Lang 6 | Partillebohallen, Partille; Attendance: 1,511; Referees: Andorka, Hucker (HUN) |
| 3 November 2013; 18:00 | 2× (yellow card) 4× (suspension) | Report | 2× (yellow card) 2× (suspension) | Partillebohallen, Partille; Attendance: 1,511; Referees: Andorka, Hucker (HUN) |

| 10 November 2013; 15:00 | Handball Club Leipzig (Germany) | 22 – 25 | (France) Metz Handball | Leipzig Arena, Leipzig; Attendance: 2,491; Referees: Lorente, Serradilla (ESP) |
| 10 November 2013; 15:00 | Kudłacz, Lang 5 | (10–11) | Andryushina 7 | Leipzig Arena, Leipzig; Attendance: 2,491; Referees: Lorente, Serradilla (ESP) |
| 10 November 2013; 15:00 | 3× (yellow card) 2× (suspension) | Report | 3× (yellow card) 4× (suspension) | Leipzig Arena, Leipzig; Attendance: 2,491; Referees: Lorente, Serradilla (ESP) |

| 10 November 2013; 16:00 | IK Sävehof (Sweden) | 25 – 25 | (Slovenia) Krim Ljubljana | Partillebohallen, Partille; Attendance: 1,355; Referees: Santos, Fonseca (POR) |
| 10 November 2013; 16:00 | Alm 7 | (16–13) | Mavsar 6 | Partillebohallen, Partille; Attendance: 1,355; Referees: Santos, Fonseca (POR) |
| 10 November 2013; 16:00 | 3× (yellow card) 3× (suspension) | Report | 3× (yellow card) 2× (suspension) 1× (red card) | Partillebohallen, Partille; Attendance: 1,355; Referees: Santos, Fonseca (POR) |

| 16 November 2013; 17:00 | Krim Ljubljana (Slovenia) | 32 – 20 | (Germany) Handball Club Leipzig | Arena Stožice, Ljubljana; Attendance: 2,500; Referees: Florescu, Duţă (ROU) |
| 16 November 2013; 17:00 | Zrnec 7 | (15–8) | Kudłacz 7 | Arena Stožice, Ljubljana; Attendance: 2,500; Referees: Florescu, Duţă (ROU) |
| 16 November 2013; 17:00 | 2× (yellow card) | Report | 3× (yellow card) 1× (suspension) | Arena Stožice, Ljubljana; Attendance: 2,500; Referees: Florescu, Duţă (ROU) |

| 17 November 2013; 13:15 | Metz Handball (France) | 30 – 20 | (Sweden) IK Sävehof | Arènes de Metz, Metz; Attendance: 4,060; Referees: Covalciuc, Covalciuc (MDA) |
| 17 November 2013; 13:15 | Zaadi 6 | (20–10) | Alm, Fogelström 4 | Arènes de Metz, Metz; Attendance: 4,060; Referees: Covalciuc, Covalciuc (MDA) |
| 17 November 2013; 13:15 | 3× (yellow card) 3× (suspension) | Report | 3× (yellow card) 2× (suspension) | Arènes de Metz, Metz; Attendance: 4,060; Referees: Covalciuc, Covalciuc (MDA) |

=== Group D ===
| Team | Pld | W | D | L | GF | GA | GD | Pts |
|---|---|---|---|---|---|---|---|---|
| (North Macedonia) ŽRK Vardar | 6 | 5 | 1 | 0 | 185 | 138 | +47 | 11 |
| (Norway) Larvik HK | 6 | 4 | 1 | 1 | 170 | 133 | +37 | 9 |
| (Spain) BM Bera Bera | 6 | 1 | 0 | 5 | 123 | 157 | −34 | 2 |
| (Croatia) RK Podravka Koprivnica | 6 | 1 | 0 | 5 | 128 | 178 | −50 | 2 |

| 5 October 2013; 19:30 | Larvik HK (Norway) | 34 – 18 | (Croatia) RK Podravka Koprivnica | Arena Larvik, Larvik; Attendance: 1,710; Referees: Sigurjónsson, Pétursson (ISL) |
| 5 October 2013; 19:30 | Riegelhuth Koren 12 | (17–7) | Milanović-Litre 5 | Arena Larvik, Larvik; Attendance: 1,710; Referees: Sigurjónsson, Pétursson (ISL) |
| 5 October 2013; 19:30 | 3× (yellow card) 4× (suspension) | Report | 2× (yellow card) 6× (suspension) | Arena Larvik, Larvik; Attendance: 1,710; Referees: Sigurjónsson, Pétursson (ISL) |

| 6 October 2013; 12:15 | BM Bera Bera (Spain) | 19 – 23 | (North Macedonia) ŽRK Vardar | Polideportivo Bidebieta, San Sebastián; Attendance: 850; Referees: Herczeg, Südi (HUN) |
| 6 October 2013; 12:15 | Ziarsolo 7 | (8–12) | Lekić 6 | Polideportivo Bidebieta, San Sebastián; Attendance: 850; Referees: Herczeg, Südi (HUN) |
| 6 October 2013; 12:15 | 3× (yellow card) 2× (suspension) 1× (red card) | Report | 3× (yellow card) 7× (suspension) 1× (red card) | Polideportivo Bidebieta, San Sebastián; Attendance: 850; Referees: Herczeg, Südi (HUN) |

| 11 October 2013; 18:30 | ŽRK Vardar (North Macedonia) | 27 – 27 | (Norway) Larvik HK | Boris Trajkovski Sports Center, Skopje; Attendance: 3,100; Referees: Caçador, Nicolau (POR) |
| 11 October 2013; 18:30 | Zebić 7 | (12–15) | Mørk 9 | Boris Trajkovski Sports Center, Skopje; Attendance: 3,100; Referees: Caçador, Nicolau (POR) |
| 11 October 2013; 18:30 | 3× (yellow card) 2× (suspension) | Report | 3× (yellow card) 4× (suspension) | Boris Trajkovski Sports Center, Skopje; Attendance: 3,100; Referees: Caçador, Nicolau (POR) |

| 12 October 2013; 18:00 | RK Podravka Koprivnica (Croatia) | 29 – 18 | (Spain) BM Bera Bera | Sportska dvorana Gimnazije "Fran Galović", Koprivnica; Attendance: 1,500; Referees: Rakytina, Tkachuk (UKR) |
| 12 October 2013; 18:00 | Živković 9 | (14–7) | Pinedo 7 | Sportska dvorana Gimnazije "Fran Galović", Koprivnica; Attendance: 1,500; Referees: Rakytina, Tkachuk (UKR) |
| 12 October 2013; 18:00 | 3× (yellow card) 2× (suspension) | Report | 3× (yellow card) 2× (suspension) | Sportska dvorana Gimnazije "Fran Galović", Koprivnica; Attendance: 1,500; Referees: Rakytina, Tkachuk (UKR) |

| 19 October 2013; 20:00 | ŽRK Vardar (North Macedonia) | 39 – 26 | (Croatia) RK Podravka Koprivnica | Boris Trajkovski Sports Center, Skopje; Attendance: 3,800; Referees: Bonaventura, Bonaventura (FRA) |
| 19 October 2013; 20:00 | Radičević 8 | (18–7) | Havić 7 | Boris Trajkovski Sports Center, Skopje; Attendance: 3,800; Referees: Bonaventura, Bonaventura (FRA) |
| 19 October 2013; 20:00 | 2× (yellow card) | Report | 2× (yellow card) 3× (suspension) | Boris Trajkovski Sports Center, Skopje; Attendance: 3,800; Referees: Bonaventura, Bonaventura (FRA) |

| 20 October 2013; 12:15 | BM Bera Bera (Spain) | 17 – 27 | (Norway) Larvik HK | Polideportivo Bidebieta, San Sebastián; Attendance: 800; Referees: Vujačić, Kazanegra (MNE) |
| 20 October 2013; 12:15 | Ziarsolo 5 | (9–13) | Mørk 6 | Polideportivo Bidebieta, San Sebastián; Attendance: 800; Referees: Vujačić, Kazanegra (MNE) |
| 20 October 2013; 12:15 | 3× (yellow card) 3× (suspension) | Report | 3× (yellow card) 2× (suspension) | Polideportivo Bidebieta, San Sebastián; Attendance: 800; Referees: Vujačić, Kazanegra (MNE) |

| 2 November 2013; 19:30 | Larvik HK (Norway) | 29 – 21 | (Spain) BM Bera Bera | Arena Larvik, Larvik; Attendance: 1,559; Referees: Lah, Sok (SLO) |
| 2 November 2013; 19:30 | Sulland 11 | (15–9) | Elorza 8 | Arena Larvik, Larvik; Attendance: 1,559; Referees: Lah, Sok (SLO) |
| 2 November 2013; 19:30 | 3× (yellow card) 3× (suspension) | Report | 2× (yellow card) 4× (suspension) | Arena Larvik, Larvik; Attendance: 1,559; Referees: Lah, Sok (SLO) |

| 3 November 2013; 18:00 | RK Podravka Koprivnica (Croatia) | 17 – 35 | (North Macedonia) ŽRK Vardar | Sportska dvorana Gimnazije "Fran Galović", Koprivnica; Attendance: 1,800; Referees: Pandzić, Mosorinski (SRB) |
| 3 November 2013; 18:00 | Živković 4 | (10–16) | Lekić 8 | Sportska dvorana Gimnazije "Fran Galović", Koprivnica; Attendance: 1,800; Referees: Pandzić, Mosorinski (SRB) |
| 3 November 2013; 18:00 | 3× (yellow card) 4× (suspension) | Report | 3× (yellow card) 2× (suspension) | Sportska dvorana Gimnazije "Fran Galović", Koprivnica; Attendance: 1,800; Referees: Pandzić, Mosorinski (SRB) |

| 10 November 2013; 18:00 | RK Podravka Koprivnica (Croatia) | 19 – 24 | (Norway) Larvik HK | Sportska dvorana Gimnazije "Fran Galović", Koprivnica; Attendance: 2,100; Referees: Kijauskaite, Zaliene (LTU) |
| 10 November 2013; 18:00 | Trifunović 8 | (8–8) | Mørk 8 | Sportska dvorana Gimnazije "Fran Galović", Koprivnica; Attendance: 2,100; Referees: Kijauskaite, Zaliene (LTU) |
| 10 November 2013; 18:00 | 2× (yellow card) 7× (suspension) | Report | 2× (yellow card) 1× (suspension) | Sportska dvorana Gimnazije "Fran Galović", Koprivnica; Attendance: 2,100; Referees: Kijauskaite, Zaliene (LTU) |

| 10 November 2013; 18:00 | ŽRK Vardar (North Macedonia) | 30 – 20 | (Spain) BM Bera Bera | Boris Trajkovski Sports Center, Skopje; Attendance: 3,500; Referees: Năstase, Stancu (ROU) |
| 10 November 2013; 18:00 | Khmyrova 6 | (15–7) | Ziarsolo 7 | Boris Trajkovski Sports Center, Skopje; Attendance: 3,500; Referees: Năstase, Stancu (ROU) |
| 10 November 2013; 18:00 | 2× (yellow card) 1× (suspension) | Report | 3× (yellow card) | Boris Trajkovski Sports Center, Skopje; Attendance: 3,500; Referees: Năstase, Stancu (ROU) |

| 16 November 2013; 19:30 | Larvik HK (Norway) | 29 – 31 | (North Macedonia) ŽRK Vardar | Arena Larvik, Larvik; Attendance: 2,457; Referees: Horváth, Márton (HUN) |
| 16 November 2013; 19:30 | Mørk 6 | (15–15) | Radičević 7 | Arena Larvik, Larvik; Attendance: 2,457; Referees: Horváth, Márton (HUN) |
| 16 November 2013; 19:30 | 3× (yellow card) 2× (suspension) | Report | 3× (yellow card) 2× (suspension) | Arena Larvik, Larvik; Attendance: 2,457; Referees: Horváth, Márton (HUN) |

| 17 November 2013; 12:15 | BM Bera Bera (Spain) | 28 – 19 | (Croatia) RK Podravka Koprivnica | Polideportivo Bidebieta, San Sebastián; Attendance: 800; Referees: Pichon, Reveret (FRA) |
| 17 November 2013; 12:15 | Ziarsolo 9 | (11–11) | Havić 4 | Polideportivo Bidebieta, San Sebastián; Attendance: 800; Referees: Pichon, Reveret (FRA) |
| 17 November 2013; 12:15 | 3× (yellow card) 3× (suspension) | Report | 3× (yellow card) 6× (suspension) | Polideportivo Bidebieta, San Sebastián; Attendance: 800; Referees: Pichon, Reveret (FRA) |

== Main round ==
The draw of the group matches was held on 19 November at the Gartenhotel Altmannsdorf in Vienna. A total of eight teams were concerned in the process, to be divided into two pots of four. Teams were divided into two pots, based on EHF coefficients. Clubs from the same pot or group could not be drawn into the same group.

=== Seedings ===
| Pot 1 | Pot 2 |
|---|---|
| (Hungary) Győri Audi ETO KC (Denmark) FC Midtjylland Håndbold (Slovenia) Krim Ljubljana (North Macedonia) ŽRK Vardar | (Germany) Thüringer HC (Montenegro) ŽRK Budućnost Podgorica (Sweden) IK Sävehof (Norway) Larvik HK |

=== Group 1 ===
| Team | Pld | W | D | L | GF | GA | GD | Pts |
|---|---|---|---|---|---|---|---|---|
| (North Macedonia) ŽRK Vardar | 6 | 3 | 2 | 1 | 154 | 142 | +12 | 8 |
| (Denmark) FC Midtjylland Håndbold | 6 | 3 | 1 | 2 | 152 | 147 | +5 | 7 |
| (Germany) Thüringer HC | 6 | 3 | 1 | 2 | 157 | 156 | +1 | 7 |
| (Sweden) IK Sävehof | 6 | 0 | 2 | 4 | 149 | 167 | −18 | 2 |

| 1 February 2014; 13:45 | FC Midtjylland Håndbold (Denmark) | 25 – 24 | (Sweden) IK Sävehof | Ikast-Brande Arena, Ikast; Attendance: 2,025; Referees: Brkić, Jusufhodžić (AUT) |
| 1 February 2014; 13:45 | Groot, Troelsen 4 | (12–14) | Oden 9 | Ikast-Brande Arena, Ikast; Attendance: 2,025; Referees: Brkić, Jusufhodžić (AUT) |
| 1 February 2014; 13:45 | 2× (yellow card) 3× (suspension) | Report | 3× (yellow card) 5× (suspension) | Ikast-Brande Arena, Ikast; Attendance: 2,025; Referees: Brkić, Jusufhodžić (AUT) |

| 2 February 2014; 18:00 | ŽRK Vardar (North Macedonia) | 31 – 25 | (Germany) Thüringer HC | Boris Trajkovski Sports Center, Skopje; Attendance: 4,000; Referees: Mata, López (ESP) |
| 2 February 2014; 18:00 | Dmitrović, Radičević 6 | (16–13) | Luzumová 8 | Boris Trajkovski Sports Center, Skopje; Attendance: 4,000; Referees: Mata, López (ESP) |
| 2 February 2014; 18:00 | 3× (yellow card) 2× (suspension) | Report | 3× (yellow card) 2× (suspension) | Boris Trajkovski Sports Center, Skopje; Attendance: 4,000; Referees: Mata, López (ESP) |

| 8 February 2014; 15:00 | Thüringer HC (Germany) | 26 – 24 | (Denmark) FC Midtjylland Håndbold | Wiedigsburghalle, Nordhausen; Attendance: 2,200; Referees: Bonaventura, Bonaventura (FRA) |
| 8 February 2014; 15:00 | Barbosa, Huber 6 | (10–14) | Jensen 6 | Wiedigsburghalle, Nordhausen; Attendance: 2,200; Referees: Bonaventura, Bonaventura (FRA) |
| 8 February 2014; 15:00 | 3× (yellow card) 6× (suspension) 1× (red card) | Report | 3× (yellow card) 2× (suspension) | Wiedigsburghalle, Nordhausen; Attendance: 2,200; Referees: Bonaventura, Bonaventura (FRA) |

| 9 February 2014; 15:30 | IK Sävehof (Sweden) | 27 – 27 | (North Macedonia) ŽRK Vardar | Partillebohallen, Partille; Attendance: 1,550; Referees: Gasmi, Gasmi (FRA) |
| 9 February 2014; 15:30 | Alm 9 | (15–15) | Lekić 7 | Partillebohallen, Partille; Attendance: 1,550; Referees: Gasmi, Gasmi (FRA) |
| 9 February 2014; 15:30 | 3× (yellow card) 2× (suspension) | Report | 3× (yellow card) 3× (suspension) | Partillebohallen, Partille; Attendance: 1,550; Referees: Gasmi, Gasmi (FRA) |

| 15 February 2014; 15:00 | Thüringer HC (Germany) | 30 – 25 | (Sweden) IK Sävehof | Wiedigsburghalle, Nordhausen; Attendance: 1,700; Referees: Lah, Sok (SLO) |
| 15 February 2014; 15:00 | Barbosa, Huber 6 | (16–13) | Alm 8 | Wiedigsburghalle, Nordhausen; Attendance: 1,700; Referees: Lah, Sok (SLO) |
| 15 February 2014; 15:00 | 2× (yellow card) 3× (suspension) | Report | 3× (yellow card) 4× (suspension) 1× (red card) | Wiedigsburghalle, Nordhausen; Attendance: 1,700; Referees: Lah, Sok (SLO) |

| 15 February 2014; 18:00 | ŽRK Vardar (North Macedonia) | 24 – 23 | (Denmark) FC Midtjylland Håndbold | Boris Trajkovski Sports Center, Skopje; Attendance: 5,000; Referees: Kékes, Kékes (HUN) |
| 15 February 2014; 18:00 | Đokić 6 | (10–12) | L. Jørgensen, S. Jørgensen 5 | Boris Trajkovski Sports Center, Skopje; Attendance: 5,000; Referees: Kékes, Kékes (HUN) |
| 15 February 2014; 18:00 | 3× (yellow card) 2× (suspension) | Report | 2× (yellow card) 1× (suspension) | Boris Trajkovski Sports Center, Skopje; Attendance: 5,000; Referees: Kékes, Kékes (HUN) |

| 2 March 2014; 16:00 | IK Sävehof (Sweden) | 26 – 32 | (Germany) Thüringer HC | Partillebohallen, Partille; Attendance: 1,515; Referees: Pech, Vagvölgyi (HUN) |
| 2 March 2014; 16:00 | Oden 9 | (13–16) | Mietzner, Nadgornaja 6 | Partillebohallen, Partille; Attendance: 1,515; Referees: Pech, Vagvölgyi (HUN) |
| 2 March 2014; 16:00 | 3× (yellow card) 3× (suspension) | Report | 2× (yellow card) 4× (suspension) | Partillebohallen, Partille; Attendance: 1,515; Referees: Pech, Vagvölgyi (HUN) |

| 2 March 2014; 18:15 | FC Midtjylland Håndbold (Denmark) | 25 – 24 | (North Macedonia) ŽRK Vardar | Ikast-Brande Arena, Ikast; Attendance: 2,048; Referees: Brehmer, Skowronek (POL) |
| 2 March 2014; 18:15 | S. Jørgensen 8 | (15–9) | Lekić 7 | Ikast-Brande Arena, Ikast; Attendance: 2,048; Referees: Brehmer, Skowronek (POL) |
| 2 March 2014; 18:15 | 3× (yellow card) 2× (suspension) | Report | 3× (yellow card) 5× (suspension) | Ikast-Brande Arena, Ikast; Attendance: 2,048; Referees: Brehmer, Skowronek (POL) |

| 8 March 2014; 15:00 | Thüringer HC (Germany) | 24 – 24 | (North Macedonia) ŽRK Vardar | Wiedigsburghalle, Nordhausen; Attendance: 2,200; Referees: Stoļarovs, Līcis (LAT) |
| 8 March 2014; 15:00 | Nadgornaja 7 | (12–15) | Lekić 10 | Wiedigsburghalle, Nordhausen; Attendance: 2,200; Referees: Stoļarovs, Līcis (LAT) |
| 8 March 2014; 15:00 | 2× (yellow card) 2× (suspension) | Report | 2× (yellow card) 4× (suspension) | Wiedigsburghalle, Nordhausen; Attendance: 2,200; Referees: Stoļarovs, Līcis (LAT) |

| 9 March 2014; 15:00 | IK Sävehof (Sweden) | 29 – 29 | (Denmark) FC Midtjylland Håndbold | Partillebohallen, Partille; Attendance: 950; Referees: Arntsen, Røen (NOR) |
| 9 March 2014; 15:00 | Roberts 6 | (14–17) | S. Jørgensen 7 | Partillebohallen, Partille; Attendance: 950; Referees: Arntsen, Røen (NOR) |
| 9 March 2014; 15:00 | 2× (yellow card) 2× (suspension) | Report | 3× (yellow card) | Partillebohallen, Partille; Attendance: 950; Referees: Arntsen, Røen (NOR) |

| 16 March 2014; 16:00 | FC Midtjylland Håndbold (Denmark) | 26 – 20 | (Germany) Thüringer HC | Ikast-Brande Arena, Ikast; Attendance: 2,443; Referees: Bonifert, Oláh (HUN) |
| 16 March 2014; 16:00 | L. Jørgensen 6 | (15–10) | Barbosa 6 | Ikast-Brande Arena, Ikast; Attendance: 2,443; Referees: Bonifert, Oláh (HUN) |
| 16 March 2014; 16:00 | 2× (yellow card) 4× (suspension) | Report | 3× (yellow card) 4× (suspension) | Ikast-Brande Arena, Ikast; Attendance: 2,443; Referees: Bonifert, Oláh (HUN) |

| 16 March 2014; 18:00 | ŽRK Vardar (North Macedonia) | 24 – 18 | (Sweden) IK Sävehof | Boris Trajkovski Sports Center, Skopje; Attendance: 6,000; Referees: Florescu, Duţă (ROU) |
| 16 March 2014; 18:00 | Lekić 7 | (11–9) | Roberts 6 | Boris Trajkovski Sports Center, Skopje; Attendance: 6,000; Referees: Florescu, Duţă (ROU) |
| 16 March 2014; 18:00 | 3× (yellow card) 4× (suspension) | Report | 2× (yellow card) 1× (suspension) | Boris Trajkovski Sports Center, Skopje; Attendance: 6,000; Referees: Florescu, Duţă (ROU) |

=== Group 2 ===
| Team | Pld | W | D | L | GF | GA | GD | Pts |
|---|---|---|---|---|---|---|---|---|
| (Hungary) Győri Audi ETO KC | 6 | 4 | 2 | 0 | 160 | 147 | +13 | 10 |
| (Montenegro) ŽRK Budućnost Podgorica | 6 | 3 | 3 | 0 | 150 | 126 | +24 | 9 |
| (Norway) Larvik HK | 6 | 1 | 1 | 4 | 134 | 147 | −13 | 3 |
| (Slovenia) Krim Ljubljana | 6 | 1 | 0 | 5 | 133 | 157 | −24 | 2 |

| 1 February 2014; 18:30 | Győri Audi ETO KC (Hungary) | 23 – 23 | (Montenegro) ŽRK Budućnost Podgorica | Egyetemi Csarnok, Győr; Attendance: 3,000; Referees: Alpaidze, Berezkina (RUS) |
| 1 February 2014; 18:30 | Amorim 6 | (9–13) | Cvijić 6 | Egyetemi Csarnok, Győr; Attendance: 3,000; Referees: Alpaidze, Berezkina (RUS) |
| 1 February 2014; 18:30 | 2× (yellow card) 3× (suspension) | Report | 2× (yellow card) 6× (suspension) | Egyetemi Csarnok, Győr; Attendance: 3,000; Referees: Alpaidze, Berezkina (RUS) |

| 1 February 2014; 20:30 | Krim Ljubljana (Slovenia) | 24 – 18 | (Norway) Larvik HK | Arena Stožice, Ljubljana; Attendance: 2,500; Referees: Brunovský, Čanda (SVK) |
| 1 February 2014; 20:30 | Penezić 7 | (12–10) | Mørk 6 | Arena Stožice, Ljubljana; Attendance: 2,500; Referees: Brunovský, Čanda (SVK) |
| 1 February 2014; 20:30 | 2× (yellow card) 4× (suspension) | Report | 3× (yellow card) 3× (suspension) | Arena Stožice, Ljubljana; Attendance: 2,500; Referees: Brunovský, Čanda (SVK) |

| 7 February 2014; 20:00 | Larvik HK (Norway) | 23 – 29 | (Hungary) Győri Audi ETO KC | Arena Larvik, Larvik; Attendance: 4,025; Referees: Pandžić, Mošorinski (SRB) |
| 7 February 2014; 20:00 | Riegelhuth Koren 5 | (13–18) | Görbicz 8 | Arena Larvik, Larvik; Attendance: 4,025; Referees: Pandžić, Mošorinski (SRB) |
| 7 February 2014; 20:00 | 3× (yellow card) 4× (suspension) | Report | 3× (yellow card) 3× (suspension) | Arena Larvik, Larvik; Attendance: 4,025; Referees: Pandžić, Mošorinski (SRB) |

| 9 February 2014; 19:00 | ŽRK Budućnost Podgorica (Montenegro) | 30 – 15 | (Slovenia) Krim Ljubljana | Morača Sports Center, Podgorica; Attendance: 5,000; Referees: Jurinović, Mrvica (CRO) |
| 9 February 2014; 19:00 | four players 4 | (13–6) | Lazović-Varlec 4 | Morača Sports Center, Podgorica; Attendance: 5,000; Referees: Jurinović, Mrvica (CRO) |
| 9 February 2014; 19:00 | 3× (yellow card) 4× (suspension) 1× (red card) | Report | 3× (yellow card) 5× (suspension) | Morača Sports Center, Podgorica; Attendance: 5,000; Referees: Jurinović, Mrvica (CRO) |

| 16 February 2014; 18:00 | Győri Audi ETO KC (Hungary) | 27 – 24 | (Slovenia) Krim Ljubljana | Egyetemi Csarnok, Győr; Attendance: 3,000; Referees: Florescu, Duţă (ROU) |
| 16 February 2014; 18:00 | Amorim, Bulatović 6 | (14–12) | Penezić 6 | Egyetemi Csarnok, Győr; Attendance: 3,000; Referees: Florescu, Duţă (ROU) |
| 16 February 2014; 18:00 | 3× (yellow card) 2× (suspension) | Report | 3× (yellow card) 2× (suspension) | Egyetemi Csarnok, Győr; Attendance: 3,000; Referees: Florescu, Duţă (ROU) |

| 16 February 2014; 20:00 | ŽRK Budućnost Podgorica (Montenegro) | 19 – 19 | (Norway) Larvik HK | Morača Sports Center, Podgorica; Attendance: 5,000; Referees: Dentz, Reibel (FRA) |
| 16 February 2014; 20:00 | Neagu 5 | (8–7) | Mørk 8 | Morača Sports Center, Podgorica; Attendance: 5,000; Referees: Dentz, Reibel (FRA) |
| 16 February 2014; 20:00 | 3× (yellow card) 3× (suspension) | Report | 2× (yellow card) 2× (suspension) | Morača Sports Center, Podgorica; Attendance: 5,000; Referees: Dentz, Reibel (FRA) |

| 1 March 2014; 18:15 | Larvik HK (Norway) | 17 – 22 | (Montenegro) ŽRK Budućnost Podgorica | Arena Larvik, Larvik; Attendance: 3,150; Referees: Erdoğan, Özdeniz (TUR) |
| 1 March 2014; 18:15 | Mørk 7 | (9–9) | Cvijić 6 | Arena Larvik, Larvik; Attendance: 3,150; Referees: Erdoğan, Özdeniz (TUR) |
| 1 March 2014; 18:15 | 3× (yellow card) 3× (suspension) | Report | 3× (yellow card) 6× (suspension) | Arena Larvik, Larvik; Attendance: 3,150; Referees: Erdoğan, Özdeniz (TUR) |

| 1 March 2014; 20:30 | Krim Ljubljana (Slovenia) | 22 – 24 | (Hungary) Győri Audi ETO KC | Arena Stožice, Ljubljana; Attendance: 2,000; Referees: Bonaventura, Bonaventura (FRA) |
| 1 March 2014; 20:30 | Krpež, Lazović-Varlec 5 | (14–14) | Görbicz 5 | Arena Stožice, Ljubljana; Attendance: 2,000; Referees: Bonaventura, Bonaventura (FRA) |
| 1 March 2014; 20:30 | 3× (yellow card) 1× (suspension) | Report | 3× (yellow card) 3× (suspension) | Arena Stožice, Ljubljana; Attendance: 2,000; Referees: Bonaventura, Bonaventura (FRA) |

| 8 March 2014; 18:15 | Larvik HK (Norway) | 28 – 22 | (Slovenia) Krim Ljubljana | Arena Larvik, Larvik; Attendance: 1,748; Referees: Schulze, Tönnies (GER) |
| 8 March 2014; 18:15 | Edin 6 | (14–12) | Mavsar 6 | Arena Larvik, Larvik; Attendance: 1,748; Referees: Schulze, Tönnies (GER) |
| 8 March 2014; 18:15 | 3× (yellow card) 3× (suspension) | Report | 2× (yellow card) 5× (suspension) | Arena Larvik, Larvik; Attendance: 1,748; Referees: Schulze, Tönnies (GER) |

| 9 March 2014; 19:15 | ŽRK Budućnost Podgorica (Montenegro) | 26 – 26 | (Hungary) Győri Audi ETO KC | Morača Sports Center, Podgorica; Attendance: 5,000; Referees: Poulsen, Mortensen (DEN) |
| 9 March 2014; 19:15 | Neagu 7 | (14–12) | Görbicz 8 | Morača Sports Center, Podgorica; Attendance: 5,000; Referees: Poulsen, Mortensen (DEN) |
| 9 March 2014; 19:15 | 3× (yellow card) 5× (suspension) | Report | 2× (yellow card) 3× (suspension) | Morača Sports Center, Podgorica; Attendance: 5,000; Referees: Poulsen, Mortensen (DEN) |

| 15 March 2014; 20:30 | Krim Ljubljana (Slovenia) | 26 – 30 | (Montenegro) ŽRK Budućnost Podgorica | Arena Stožice, Ljubljana; Attendance: 1,500; Referees: Pandzić, Mosorinski (SRB) |
| 15 March 2014; 20:30 | Penezić 8 | (15–17) | Ježić 6 | Arena Stožice, Ljubljana; Attendance: 1,500; Referees: Pandzić, Mosorinski (SRB) |
| 15 March 2014; 20:30 | 2× (yellow card) 2× (suspension) | Report | 3× (yellow card) 4× (suspension) | Arena Stožice, Ljubljana; Attendance: 1,500; Referees: Pandzić, Mosorinski (SRB) |

| 16 March 2014; 19:05 | Győri Audi ETO KC (Hungary) | 31 – 29 | (Norway) Larvik HK | Egyetemi Csarnok, Győr; Attendance: 3,000; Referees: Lythje, Christiansen (DEN) |
| 16 March 2014; 19:05 | Görbicz 7 | (14–12) | Edin 11 | Egyetemi Csarnok, Győr; Attendance: 3,000; Referees: Lythje, Christiansen (DEN) |
| 16 March 2014; 19:05 | 3× (yellow card) 3× (suspension) | Report | 2× (yellow card) 3× (suspension) | Egyetemi Csarnok, Győr; Attendance: 3,000; Referees: Lythje, Christiansen (DEN) |
