= 2013–14 EHF Women's Champions League qualifying =

This article describes the qualifying for the 2013–14 EHF Women's Champions League.

== Format ==
A total of 17 teams will take part in the qualification tournaments. The clubs will be drawn into four groups of four and play a semifinal and the final. The winner of the qualification groups advance to the group stage. Matches will be played at 14–15 September 2013.

The draw took place on 27 June, at 14:00 local time at Vienna, Austria.

== Seedings ==
Pot 1	Pot 2	Pot 3	Pot 4
(Hungary) FTC-Rail Cargo Hungaria (Norway) Byåsen HE (Romania) HCM Baia Mare (Russia) Rostov-Don	(Denmark) Team Tvis Holstebro (Germany) HC Leipzig (Hungary) Érdi VSE (North Macedonia) ŽRK Vardar	PO (Switzerland) LK Zug (Italy) PDO Salerno (Belarus) BNTU Minsk	(Norway) Tertnes HE (Denmark) Viborg HK (France) Fleury Loiret HB (Croatia) RK Lokomotiva Zagreb

== Playoff ==
The winner advanced to the qualification phase 2.

=== First leg ===
31 August 2013; 17:00	SERCODAK Dalfsen (Netherlands)	34 – 31	(Turkey) Muratpaşa BSK Antalya	Antalya; Attendance: 500; Referees: Florescu, Duţă (ROU)
31 August 2013; 17:00	Schoenaker 8	(16–10)	İskenderoğlu 11	Antalya; Attendance: 500; Referees: Florescu, Duţă (ROU)
31 August 2013; 17:00	3× (yellow card) 5× (suspension) 1× (red card)	Report	2× (yellow card) 2× (suspension)	Antalya; Attendance: 500; Referees: Florescu, Duţă (ROU)

=== Second leg ===
1 September 2013; 17:00	Muratpaşa BSK Antalya (Turkey)	24 – 34	(Netherlands) SERCODAK Dalfsen	Antalya; Attendance: 400; Referees: Florescu, Duţă (ROU)
1 September 2013; 17:00	Laiuk, Sahin 6	(12–15)	van Dort 6	Antalya; Attendance: 400; Referees: Florescu, Duţă (ROU)
1 September 2013; 17:00	3× (yellow card) 4× (suspension)	Report	2× (yellow card) 5× (suspension)	Antalya; Attendance: 400; Referees: Florescu, Duţă (ROU)

SERCODAK Dalfsen won 68–55 on aggregate.

== Qualification tournament 1 ==
An organizer was announced later. Byåsen HE was chosen to organize the tournament.

Semi-finals
7 September 2013
(Norway) Byåsen HE	21
(Norway) Tertnes HE	20
7 September 2013
(Germany) HC Leipzig	29
(Belarus) BNTU Minsk	24

Final
8 September 2013
(Norway) Byåsen HE	23
(Germany) HC Leipzig	27
Third place
8 September 2013
(Norway) Tertnes HE	28
(Belarus) BNTU Minsk	25

=== Semifinals ===
7 September 2013; 15:00	Byåsen HE (Norway)	21 – 20	(Norway) Tertnes HE	Trondheim Spektrum, Trondheim; Attendance: 465; Referees: Brunovský, Čanda (SVK)
7 September 2013; 15:00	Nøstvold 8	(6–7)	Gossé 7	Trondheim Spektrum, Trondheim; Attendance: 465; Referees: Brunovský, Čanda (SVK)
7 September 2013; 15:00	2× (yellow card) 2× (suspension)	Report	3× (yellow card) 3× (suspension)	Trondheim Spektrum, Trondheim; Attendance: 465; Referees: Brunovský, Čanda (SVK)

7 September 2013; 17:30	HC Leipzig (Germany)	29 – 24	(Belarus) BNTU Minsk	Trondheim Spektrum, Trondheim; Attendance: 150; Referees: Kurtagic, Wetterwik (SWE)
7 September 2013; 17:30	Kudłacz 7	(16–9)	Arishina 9	Trondheim Spektrum, Trondheim; Attendance: 150; Referees: Kurtagic, Wetterwik (SWE)
7 September 2013; 17:30	3× (yellow card) 3× (suspension)	Report	3× (yellow card) 2× (suspension)	Trondheim Spektrum, Trondheim; Attendance: 150; Referees: Kurtagic, Wetterwik (SWE)

=== Third place game ===
8 September 2013; 15:30	Tertnes HE (Norway)	28 – 25	(Belarus) BNTU Minsk	Trondheim Spektrum, Trondheim; Attendance: 100; Referees: Kurtagic, Wetterwik (SWE)
8 September 2013; 15:30	Lied 10	(10–13)	Silitskaya 10	Trondheim Spektrum, Trondheim; Attendance: 100; Referees: Kurtagic, Wetterwik (SWE)
8 September 2013; 15:30	3× (yellow card)	Report	3× (yellow card) 3× (suspension)	Trondheim Spektrum, Trondheim; Attendance: 100; Referees: Kurtagic, Wetterwik (SWE)

=== Final ===
8 September 2013; 18:00	Byåsen HE (Norway)	23 – 27	(Germany) HC Leipzig	Trondheim Spektrum, Trondheim; Attendance: 626; Referees: Brunovský, Čanda (SVK)
8 September 2013; 18:00	Herrem 5	(12–13)	Müller 8	Trondheim Spektrum, Trondheim; Attendance: 626; Referees: Brunovský, Čanda (SVK)
8 September 2013; 18:00	2× (yellow card) 3× (suspension)	Report	3× (yellow card) 1× (suspension)	Trondheim Spektrum, Trondheim; Attendance: 626; Referees: Brunovský, Čanda (SVK)

== Qualification tournament 2 ==
Initially, LK Zug had the right to organise the tournament, but the club didn't enjoy this right, therefore this tournament was organized by FTC-Rail Cargo Hungaria.

Semi-finals
14 September 2013
(Hungary) Ferencváros	26
(Croatia) RK Zagreb	23
14 September 2013
(Hungary) Érd HC	34
(Switzerland) LK Zug	25

Final
15 September 2013
(Hungary) Ferencváros	31
(Hungary) Érd HC	24
Third place
15 September 2013
(Croatia) RK Lokomotiva Zagreb	35
(Switzerland) LK Zug	24

=== Semifinals ===
14 September 2013; 15:00	Érd HC (Hungary)	34 – 25	(Switzerland) LK Zug	Elek Gyula Aréna, Budapest; Attendance: 950; Referees: Marić, Mašić (SRB)
14 September 2013; 15:00	Kovács 8	(18–14)	Gwerder 5	Elek Gyula Aréna, Budapest; Attendance: 950; Referees: Marić, Mašić (SRB)
14 September 2013; 15:00	3× (yellow card) 2× (suspension)	Report	2× (yellow card) 3× (suspension)	Elek Gyula Aréna, Budapest; Attendance: 950; Referees: Marić, Mašić (SRB)

14 September 2013; 18:00	FTC-Rail Cargo Hungaria (Hungary)	26 – 23	(Croatia) RK Lokomotiva Zagreb	Elek Gyula Aréna, Budapest; Attendance: 1,130; Referees: Gjeding, Hansen (DEN)
14 September 2013; 18:00	Zácsik 9	(7–9)	Bašić, Rajović 4	Elek Gyula Aréna, Budapest; Attendance: 1,130; Referees: Gjeding, Hansen (DEN)
14 September 2013; 18:00	3× (yellow card) 3× (suspension)	Report	3× (yellow card) 6× (suspension)	Elek Gyula Aréna, Budapest; Attendance: 1,130; Referees: Gjeding, Hansen (DEN)

=== Third place game ===
15 September 2013; 14:00	RK Lokomotiva Zagreb (Croatia)	35 – 24	(Switzerland) LK Zug	Elek Gyula Aréna, Budapest; Attendance: 950; Referees: Marić, Mašić (SRB)
15 September 2013; 14:00	Koznjak 6	(18–10)	three players 4	Elek Gyula Aréna, Budapest; Attendance: 950; Referees: Marić, Mašić (SRB)
15 September 2013; 14:00	3× (yellow card) 4× (suspension) 1× (red card)	Report	3× (yellow card) 3× (suspension)	Elek Gyula Aréna, Budapest; Attendance: 950; Referees: Marić, Mašić (SRB)

=== Final ===
15 September 2013; 16:15	FTC-Rail Cargo Hungaria (Hungary)	31 – 24	(Hungary) Érd HC	Elek Gyula Aréna, Budapest; Attendance: 1,200; Referees: Gjeding, Hansen (DEN)
15 September 2013; 16:15	Tomori 7	(13–16)	Klivinyi 7	Elek Gyula Aréna, Budapest; Attendance: 1,200; Referees: Gjeding, Hansen (DEN)
15 September 2013; 16:15	3× (yellow card) 6× (suspension)	Report	3× (yellow card) 3× (suspension)	Elek Gyula Aréna, Budapest; Attendance: 1,200; Referees: Gjeding, Hansen (DEN)

== Qualification tournament 3 ==
HCM Baia Mare organized the tournament.

Semi-finals
14 September 2013
(Romania) HCM Baia Mare	26
(Denmark) Viborg HK	25
14 September 2013
(Denmark) Team Tvis Holstebro	38
(Netherlands) SERCODAK Dalfsen	30

Final
15 September 2013
(Romania) HCM Baia Mare	36
(Denmark) Team Tvis Holstebro	23
Third place
15 September 2013
(Denmark) Viborg HK	33
(Netherlands) SERCODAK Dalfsen	12

=== Semifinals ===
14 September 2013; 11:00	HCM Baia Mare (Romania)	26 – 25	(Denmark) Viborg HK	Lascăr Pană, Baia Mare; Attendance: 2,080; Referees: Bonaventura, Bonaventura (FRA)
14 September 2013; 11:00	Buceschi 8	(11–12)	Damnjanović 8	Lascăr Pană, Baia Mare; Attendance: 2,080; Referees: Bonaventura, Bonaventura (FRA)
14 September 2013; 11:00	3× (yellow card) 4× (suspension)	Report	2× (yellow card) 2× (suspension)	Lascăr Pană, Baia Mare; Attendance: 2,080; Referees: Bonaventura, Bonaventura (FRA)

14 September 2013; 14:00	Team Tvis Holstebro (Denmark)	38 – 30	(Netherlands) SERCODAK Dalfsen	Lascăr Pană, Baia Mare; Attendance: 1,700; Referees: Kouz, Zhoba (UKR)
14 September 2013; 14:00	Gravholt 8	(21–14)	Nijboer 6	Lascăr Pană, Baia Mare; Attendance: 1,700; Referees: Kouz, Zhoba (UKR)
14 September 2013; 14:00	3× (yellow card) 6× (suspension)	Report	3× (yellow card) 3× (suspension)	Lascăr Pană, Baia Mare; Attendance: 1,700; Referees: Kouz, Zhoba (UKR)

=== Third place game ===
15 September 2013; 15:00	Viborg HK (Denmark)	33 – 12	(Netherlands) SERCODAK Dalfsen	Lascăr Pană, Baia Mare; Attendance: 1,700; Referees: Kouz, Zhoba (UKR)
15 September 2013; 15:00	Damnjanović 6	(13–7)	Logtenberg 5	Lascăr Pană, Baia Mare; Attendance: 1,700; Referees: Kouz, Zhoba (UKR)
15 September 2013; 15:00	2× (yellow card) 4× (suspension)	Report	2× (yellow card) 4× (suspension)	Lascăr Pană, Baia Mare; Attendance: 1,700; Referees: Kouz, Zhoba (UKR)

=== Final ===
15 September 2013; 18:00	HCM Baia Mare (Romania)	36 – 23	(Denmark) Team Tvis Holstebro	Lascăr Pană, Baia Mare; Attendance: 2,080; Referees: Bonaventura, Bonaventura (FRA)
15 September 2013; 18:00	Geiger, Pîrvuț 7	(20–10)	three players 4	Lascăr Pană, Baia Mare; Attendance: 2,080; Referees: Bonaventura, Bonaventura (FRA)
15 September 2013; 18:00	3× (yellow card) 1× (suspension)	Report	3× (yellow card) 4× (suspension)	Lascăr Pană, Baia Mare; Attendance: 2,080; Referees: Bonaventura, Bonaventura (FRA)

== Qualification tournament 4 ==
PDO Salerno organized the tournament.

Semi-finals
14 September 2013
(Russia) Rostov-Don	21
(France) Fleury Loiret HB	26
14 September 2013
(North Macedonia) ŽRK Vardar	35
(Italy) PDO Salerno	16

Final
15 September 2013
(France) Fleury Loiret HB	25
(North Macedonia) ŽRK Vardar	33
Third place
15 September 2013
(Russia) Rostov-Don	41
(Italy) PDO Salerno	18

=== Semifinals ===
14 September 2013; 16:30	Rostov-Don (Russia)	21 – 26	(France) Fleury Loiret HB	Palasele, Eboli; Attendance: 100; Referees: Baďura, Ondogrecula (SVK)
14 September 2013; 16:30	Svitanko 5	(11–12)	Fernández 8	Palasele, Eboli; Attendance: 100; Referees: Baďura, Ondogrecula (SVK)
14 September 2013; 16:30	3× (yellow card) 3× (suspension)	Report	3× (yellow card) 6× (suspension)	Palasele, Eboli; Attendance: 100; Referees: Baďura, Ondogrecula (SVK)

14 September 2013; 19:00	ŽRK Vardar (North Macedonia)	35 – 16	(Italy) PDO Salerno	Palasele, Eboli; Attendance: 200; Referees: Covalciuc, Covalciuc (MDA)
14 September 2013; 19:00	Kostyukova 6	(14–4)	Vinyukova 4	Palasele, Eboli; Attendance: 200; Referees: Covalciuc, Covalciuc (MDA)
14 September 2013; 19:00	3× (yellow card) 5× (suspension)	Report	3× (yellow card) 5× (suspension)	Palasele, Eboli; Attendance: 200; Referees: Covalciuc, Covalciuc (MDA)

=== Third place game ===
15 September 2013; 16:30	Rostov-Don (Russia)	41 – 18	(Italy) PDO Salerno	Palasele, Eboli; Attendance: 200; Referees: Covalciuc, Covalciuc (MDA)
15 September 2013; 16:30	Managarova, Sen 9	(22–8)	Vinyukova 6	Palasele, Eboli; Attendance: 200; Referees: Covalciuc, Covalciuc (MDA)
15 September 2013; 16:30	2× (yellow card) 2× (suspension)	Report	3× (yellow card) 1× (suspension)	Palasele, Eboli; Attendance: 200; Referees: Covalciuc, Covalciuc (MDA)

=== Final ===
15 September 2013; 18:30	Fleury Loiret HB (France)	25 – 33	(North Macedonia) ŽRK Vardar	Palasele, Eboli; Attendance: 300; Referees: Baďura, Ondogrecula (SVK)
15 September 2013; 18:30	Fernández 7	(11–18)	Zebić 9	Palasele, Eboli; Attendance: 300; Referees: Baďura, Ondogrecula (SVK)
15 September 2013; 18:30	3× (yellow card) 4× (suspension)	Report	3× (yellow card) 5× (suspension)	Palasele, Eboli; Attendance: 300; Referees: Baďura, Ondogrecula (SVK)
