= 2013–14 EHF Women's Champions League =

Tournament details
- Dates: 24 August 2013–11 May 2014
- Teams: 17 (qualification stage); 16 (group stage); 8 (Main round); 4 (knockout stage)

Final positions
- Champions: (Hungary) Győri Audi ETO KC (2nd title)
- Runners-up: (Montenegro) ŽRK Budućnost

Tournament statistics
- Matches played: 76
- Goals scored: 3,883 (51.09 per match)
- Attendance: 213,939 (2,815 per match)
- Top scorer(s): (Hungary) Anita Görbicz (87 goals)

The 2013–14 EHF Women's Champions League is the 21st edition of the EHF Women's Champions League, the competition for top women's clubs of Europe, organized and supervised by the European Handball Federation.

Győri Audi ETO KC were the title holder and successfully defended their title.

== Overview ==
=== Format ===
The clubs were drawn into four groups of four and played a semifinal and the final. The winner of the qualification groups advanced to the group stage.

=== Team allocation ===
Group matches
(Austria) Hypo Niederösterreich	(Croatia) RK Podravka Koprivnica	(Denmark) FC Midtjylland Håndbold	(France) Metz Handball
(Germany) Thüringer HC	(Hungary) Győri Audi ETO KC^{TH}	(Montenegro) Budućnost Podgorica	(Norway) Larvik HK
(Poland) SPR Lublin SSA	(Slovenia) Krim Ljubljana	(Spain) BM Bera Bera	(Sweden) IK Sävehof
WQT1	WQT2	WQT3	WQT4
Qualification Tournament
(Belarus) BNTU Minsk	(Croatia) RK Lokomotiva Zagreb	(Denmark) Team Tvis Holstebro	(Denmark) Viborg HK
(France) Fleury Loiret HB	(Germany) Handball Club Leipzig	(Hungary) Érd HC	(Hungary) FTC-Rail Cargo Hungaria
(Italy) PDO Salerno	(North Macedonia) ŽRK Vardar	(Netherlands) SERCODAK Dalfsen	(Norway) Byåsen HE
(Norway) Tertnes HE	(Romania) HCM Baia Mare	(Russia) Rostov-Don	(Switzerland) LK Zug
(Turkey) Muratpaşa BSK

^{TH} Title Holder

=== Round and draw dates ===
Phase	Round	Draw date	First leg	Second leg
Qualifying	Qualification Tournament	27 June 2013	14–15 September 2013	
Group stage	Matchday 1	28 July 2013	5–6 October 2013	
Group stage	Matchday 2	28 July 2013	12–13 October 2013	
Group stage	Matchday 3	28 July 2013	19–20 October 2013	
Group stage	Matchday 4	28 July 2013	2–3 November 2013	
Group stage	Matchday 5	28 July 2013	9–10 November 2013	
Group stage	Matchday 6	28 July 2013	16–17 November 2013	
Main round	Matchday 1	19 November 2013	1–2 February 2014	
Main round	Matchday 2	19 November 2013	8–9 February 2014	
Main round	Matchday 3	19 November 2013	15–16 February 2014	
Main round	Matchday 4	19 November 2013	1–2 March 2014	
Main round	Matchday 5	19 November 2013	8–9 March 2014	
Main round	Matchday 6	19 November 2013	15–16 March 2014	
Final stage	Final Four	TBD	3–4 May 2014	

== Qualification stage ==
=== Qualification tournament ===
A total of 17 teams took part in the qualification tournaments. The clubs were drawn into four groups of four and played a semifinal and the final. The winner of the qualification groups advanced to the group stage. Matches were played at 14–15 September 2013. The draw took place on 27 June, at 14:00 local time at Vienna, Austria.

=== Seedings ===
Pot 1	Pot 2	Pot 3	Pot 4
(Hungary) FTC-Rail Cargo Hungaria (Norway) Byåsen HE (Romania) HCM Baia Mare (Russia) Rostov-Don	(Denmark) Team Tvis Holstebro (Germany) Handball Club Leipzig (Hungary) Érd HC (North Macedonia) ŽRK Vardar	(Netherlands) SERCODAK Dalfsen (Switzerland) LK Zug (Italy) PDO Salerno (Belarus) BNTU Minsk	(Norway) Tertnes HE (Denmark) Viborg HK (France) Fleury Loiret HB (Croatia) RK Lokomotiva Zagreb

=== Playoff ===
The winner advanced to the qualification phase 2.

Team 1	Agg.	Team 2	1st leg	2nd leg
SERCODAK Dalfsen (Netherlands)	68–55	(Turkey) Muratpaşa BSK	34–31	34–24

=== Qualification tournament 1 ===
Semi-finals
7 September 2013
(Norway) Byåsen HE	21
(Norway) Tertnes HE	20
7 September 2013
(Germany) HC Leipzig	29
(Belarus) BNTU Minsk	24

Final
8 September 2013
(Norway) Byåsen HE	23
(Germany) HC Leipzig	27
Third place
8 September 2013
(Norway) Tertnes HE	28
(Belarus) BNTU Minsk	25

=== Qualification tournament 2 ===
Semi-finals
14 September 2013
(Hungary) Ferencváros	26
(Croatia) RK Lokomotiva Zagreb	23
14 September 2013
(Hungary) Érd HC	34
(Switzerland) LK Zug	25

Final
15 September 2013
(Hungary) Ferencváros	31
(Hungary) Érd HC	24
Third place
15 September 2013
(Croatia) RK Lokomotiva Zagreb	35
(Switzerland) LK Zug	24

=== Qualification tournament 3 ===
Semi-finals
14 September 2013
(Romania) HCM Baia Mare	26
(Denmark) Viborg HK	25
14 September 2013
(Denmark) Team Tvis Holstebro	38
(Netherlands) SERCODAK Dalfsen	30

Final
15 September 2013
(Romania) HCM Baia Mare	36
(Denmark) Team Tvis Holstebro	23
Third place
15 September 2013
(Denmark) Viborg HK	33
(Netherlands) SERCODAK Dalfsen	12

=== Qualification tournament 4 ===
Semi-finals
14 September 2013
(Russia) Rostov-Don	21
(France) Fleury Loiret HB	26
14 September 2013
(North Macedonia) ŽRK Vardar	35
(Italy) PDO Salerno	16

Final
15 September 2013
(France) Fleury Loiret HB	25
(North Macedonia) ŽRK Vardar	33
Third place
15 September 2013
(Russia) Rostov-Don	41
(Italy) PDO Salerno	18

== Group stage ==
The draw of the group matches was held on 28 July in Vienna. A total of sixteen teams will be concerned in the process, to be divided into four pots of four. Teams are divided into four pots, based on EHF coefficients. Clubs from the same pot or the same association could not be drawn into the same group.

=== Seedings ===
Pot 1	Pot 2	Pot 3	Pot 4
(Hungary) Győri Audi ETO KC (Norway) Larvik HK (Montenegro) ŽRK Budućnost (Slovenia) Krim Ljubljana	(Spain) BM Bera Bera (Denmark) FC Midtjylland Håndbold (Germany) Thüringer HC (France) Metz Handball	(Austria) Hypo Niederösterreich (Croatia) RK Podravka Koprivnica (Sweden) IK Sävehof (Poland) SPR Lublin SSA	(Germany) Handball Club Leipzig (Hungary) Ferencváros (Romania) HCM Baia Mare (North Macedonia) ŽRK Vardar

=== Group A ===
Team	Pld	W	D	L	GF	GA	GD	Pts	GKC	THU	NIE	HCM
(Hungary) Győri Audi ETO KC	6	6	0	0	192	143	+49	12	—	29–22	41–22	28–26
(Germany) Thüringer HC	6	2	0	4	159	165	−6	4	25–33	—	34–25	36–29
(Austria) Hypo Niederösterreich	6	2	0	4	149	170	−21	4	27–28	29–23	—	23–20
(Romania) HCM Baia Mare	6	2	0	4	140	162	−22	4	21–33	20–19	24–23	—

=== Group B ===
Team	Pld	W	D	L	GF	GA	GD	Pts	FCM	ŽRK	FTC	SPR
(Denmark) FC Midtjylland Håndbold	6	5	0	1	156	139	+17	10	—	21–19	32–23	37–26
(Montenegro) ŽRK Budućnost Podgorica	6	4	0	2	156	125	+31	8	22–15	—	29–21	31–19
(Hungary) FTC-Rail Cargo Hungaria	6	3	0	3	162	161	+1	6	25–26	27–25	—	40–25
(Poland) SPR Lublin SSA	6	0	0	6	140	189	−49	0	24–25	22–30	24–26	—

=== Group C ===
Team	Pld	W	D	L	GF	GA	GD	Pts	RKK	IKS	MET	HCL
(Slovenia) Krim Ljubljana	6	4	1	1	167	138	+29	9	—	36–28	27–21	32–20
(Sweden) IK Sävehof	6	3	1	2	169	172	−3	7	25–25	—	32–30	30–23
(France) Metz Handball	6	3	0	3	149	144	+5	6	21–20	30–20	—	22–23
(Germany) Handball Club Leipzig	6	1	0	5	139	170	−31	2	23–27	28–34	22–25	—

=== Group D ===
Team	Pld	W	D	L	GF	GA	GD	Pts	ŽRK	LHK	BMB	RKP
(North Macedonia) ŽRK Vardar	6	5	1	0	185	138	+47	11	—	27–27	30–20	39–26
(Norway) Larvik HK	6	4	1	1	170	133	+37	9	29–31	—	29–21	34–18
(Spain) BM Bera Bera	6	1	0	5	123	157	−34	2	18–23	17–27	—	28–19
(Croatia) RK Podravka Koprivnica	6	1	0	5	128	178	−50	2	17–35	19–24	29–18	—

== Main round ==
The draw of the group matches was held on 19 November at the Gartenhotel Altmannsdorf in Vienna. A total of eight teams were concerned in the process, to be divided into two pots of four. Teams were divided into two pots, based on EHF coefficients. Clubs from the same pot or group could not be drawn into the same group.

=== Seedings ===
Pot 1	Pot 2
(Hungary) Győri Audi ETO KC (Denmark) FC Midtjylland Håndbold (Slovenia) Krim Ljubljana (North Macedonia) ŽRK Vardar	(Germany) Thüringer HC (Montenegro) ŽRK Budućnost Podgorica (Sweden) IK Sävehof (Norway) Larvik HK

=== Group 1 ===
Team	Pld	W	D	L	GF	GA	GD	Pts	ŽRK	FCM	THU	IKS
(North Macedonia) ŽRK Vardar	6	3	2	1	154	142	+12	8	—	24–23	31–25	24–18
(Denmark) FC Midtjylland Håndbold	6	3	1	2	152	147	+5	7	25–24	—	26–20	25–24
(Germany) Thüringer HC	6	3	1	2	157	156	+1	7	24–24	26–24	—	30–25
(Sweden) IK Sävehof	6	0	2	4	149	167	−18	2	27–27	29–29	26–32	—

=== Group 2 ===
Team	Pld	W	D	L	GF	GA	GD	Pts	GKC	ŽRK	LHK	RKK
(Hungary) Győri Audi ETO KC	6	4	2	0	160	147	+13	10	—	23–23	31–29	27–24
(Montenegro) ŽRK Budućnost Podgorica	6	3	3	0	150	126	+24	9	26–26	—	19–19	30–15
(Norway) Larvik HK	6	1	1	4	134	147	−13	3	23–29	17–22	—	28–22
(Slovenia) Krim Ljubljana	6	1	0	5	133	157	−24	2	22–24	26–30	24–18	—

== Final Four ==
In November 2013 the European Handball Federation announced that for the first time in the competition's history, the winner of the EHF Women's Champions League would be decided in a Final Four tournament. The event took place at the László Papp Budapest Sports Arena in Budapest, Hungary on 3–4 May 2014.

Semifinals
3 May 2014
(North Macedonia) ŽRK Vardar	20
(Montenegro) Budućnost (ET)	22
3 May 2014
(Hungary) Győri Audi ETO KC	29
(Denmark) FC Midtjylland	26

Final
4 May 2014
(Montenegro) Budućnost	21
(Hungary) Győri Audi ETO KC	27
Third-place playoff
4 May 2014
(North Macedonia) ŽRK Vardar	34
(Denmark) FC Midtjylland	31

=== All-Star Team ===
- Goalkeeper: Clara Woltering (GER)
- Left wing: Majda Mehmedović (MNE)
- Left back: Eduarda Amorim (BRA)
- Playmaker: Anita Görbicz (HUN)
- Pivot: Ana Dokic (MNE)
- Right back: Katarina Bulatović (MNE)
- Right wing: Jovanka Radičević (MNE)

=== Other awards ===
- Most Valuable Player of the Final Four: Katrine Lunde Haraldsen (NOR)
- Best Defence Player: Suzana Lazovic (MNE)
