= Natalia Vinyukova =

Russian handball player

Personal information
- Full name: Natalia Vinyukova
- Nationality: Russian
- Born: 27 March 1989 (age 37) Maykop, Russia
- Height: 1.78 m (5 ft 10 in)

Sport
- Sport: Handball
- Position: Left Back
- Current club: MKS Lublin

Senior clubs
- Years: Team
- 2014–2017: HC Kuban Krasnodar
- 2017–2018: Zvezda Zvenigorod
- 2018–2019: Gloria Buzău
- 2019–2020: Măgura Cisnădie
- 2020-: MKS Lublin

Natalia Vinyukova (born 27 March 1989) is a Russian handballer who plays for MKS Lublin.
