= Dina Havić =

Croatian handball player (born 1987)

Personal information
- Nationality: Croatian
- Born: 13 November 1987 (age 38) Rijeka, SR Croatia, SFR Yugoslavia
- Height: 1.87 m (6 ft 2 in)

Sport
- Sport: Handball
- Position: Left Back
- Current club: Yenimahalle Bld. SK
- Number: 13
National team
- Years: Team
- –: Croatia

Dina Havić (born November 13, 1987) is a Croatian handballer playing for Yenimahalle Bld. SK and the Croatian national team.

She played for RK Lokomotiva Zagreb (2008–2015) in her country before she transferred to the Ankara-based team Yenimahalle Bld. SK to play in the Turkish Women's Handball Super League.
