= Timea Tătar =

Romanian handball player (born 1989)

Personal information
- Full name: Timea Judita Tătar
- Nationality: Romanian
- Born: 28 July 1989 (age 37) Baia Mare, Romania
- Height: 1.70 m (5 ft 7 in)

Sport
- Sport: Handball
- Position: Pivot
- Current club: Măgura Cisnădie

Senior clubs
- Years: Team
- 2008–2016: HCM Baia Mare
- 2009–2010: → HC Oțelul Galați (loan)
- 2016–2017: HC Dunărea Brăila
- 2017–2018: Corona Brașov
- 2018-2020: SCM Craiova
- 2020-: Măgura Cisnădie
National team
Years	Team	Apps	(Gls)
2013–	Romania	4	(3)

Timea Judita Tătar (born 28 July 1989) is a Romanian handballer for Măgura Cisnădie.

== Achievements ==
- Liga Naţională:
  - Gold Medalist: 2014
  - Silver Medalist: 2013, 2015, 2016, 2017
- Cupa României:
  - Gold Medalist: 2013, 2014, 2015
  - Bronze Medalist: 2016
- Supercupa României:
  - Winner: 2013, 2014, 2015
