= Melinda Geiger =

Romanian handball player (born 1987)

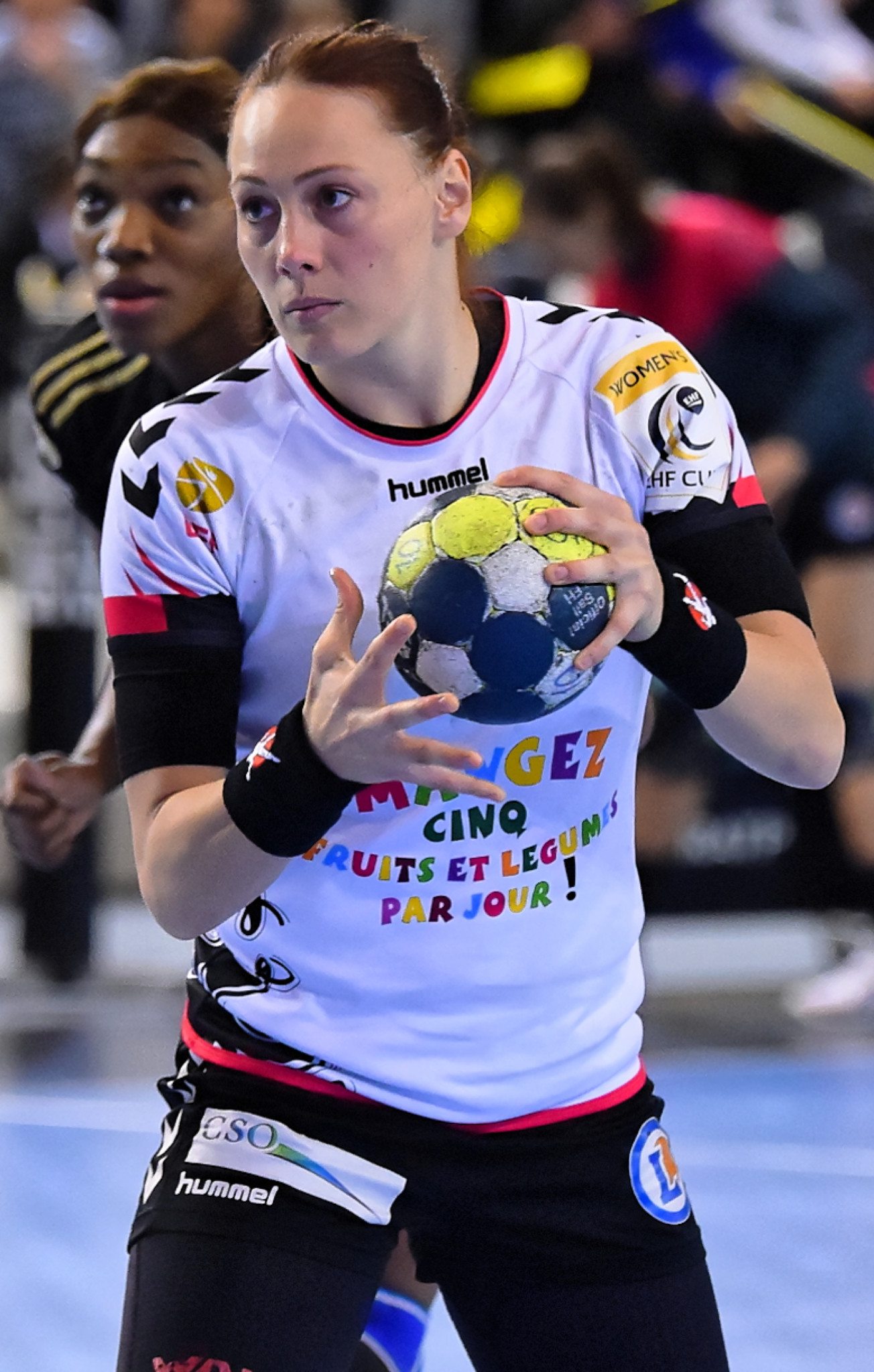
- Geiger in 2017

Personal information
- Full name: Melinda Anamaria Geiger
- Nationality: Romanian
- Born: 28 March 1987 (age 39) Baia Mare, Romania
- Height: 1.74 m (5 ft 9 in)

Sport
- Sport: Handball
- Position: Right Back
- Current club: CS Gloria 2018 Bistrița-Năsăud

Senior clubs
- Years: Team
- 2003–2010: HCM Baia Mare
- 2010–2013: CS Oltchim Vâlcea
- 2012: → Thüringer HC (loan)
- 2012–2013: → HCM Baia Mare (loan)
- 2013–2016: HCM Baia Mare
- 2016–2017: Brest Bretagne HB
- 2017–2019: Siófok KC
- 2022: CS Gloria 2018 Bistrița-Năsăud
National team
Years	Team	Apps	(Gls)
–	Romania	113	(263)
Medal record
World Championship
Bronze medal – third place	2015 Denmark
European Championship
Bronze medal – third place	2010 Denmark & Norway

Melinda Anamaria Geiger (born 28 March 1987) is a Romanian handball player who is playing for CS Gloria 2018 Bistrița-Năsăud and the Romanian national team.

Geiger announced her retirement in February 2019 at the age of 31 citing recurring knee problems but came back from retirement in 2022 and joined CS Gloria 2018 Bistrița-Năsăud.

== Achievements ==
- German Championship:
  - Winner: 2012
- Romanian Championship:
  - Winner: 2011, 2014
  - Silver Medalist: 2013, 2015, 2016
- French Championship:
  - Silver Medalist: 2017
- Romanian Cup:
  - Winner: 2011, 2013, 2014, 2015
- Romanian Supercup:
  - Winner: 2011, 2013
- IHF World Championship:
  - Bronze Medalist: 2015
- European Championship:
  - Bronze Medalist: 2010
- GF World Cup:
  - Gold Medalist: 2010
  - Silver Medalist: 2006

== Personal life ==
She is the daughter of Margareta and Mihály Geiger, former sportsman. Although Melinda is of Hungarian descent through her father, she does not speak Hungarian at all. She graduated in foreign languages (German-English). Geiger has a brother and sister.
