= 2017 World Women's Handball Championship squads =

This article displays the squads for the 2017 World Women's Handball Championship. Each team consists of up to 28 players, of whom 16 may be fielded for each match.

Age, club, caps and goals as of 1 December 2017.

== Group A ==
=== Angola ===
The squad was announced on 23 November 2017.

Head coach: Morten Soubak

No.	Pos.	Name	Date of birth (age)	Height	App.	Goals	Club
2	CB	Vilma Nenganga	12 September 1996 (aged 21)	1.72 m	8	12	(Angola) Petro de Luanda
3	LB	Iracelma Silva	1 February 1991 (aged 26)	1.80 m	17	20	(Angola) Primeiro de Agosto
4	LB	Manuela Paulino	15 April 1996 (aged 21)	1.70 m	3	0	(Angola) Petro de Luanda
6	RW	Juliana Machado	6 November 1994 (aged 23)	1.70 m	39	73	(Angola) Primeiro de Agosto
7	RB	Vilma Silva	3 June 1997 (aged 20)	1.70 m	7	9	(Angola) Marinha de Guerra
8	CB	Helena Paulo	24 January 1998 (aged 19)	1.70 m	7	2	(Angola) Marinha de Guerra
10	P	Albertina Kassoma	12 June 1996 (aged 21)	1.90 m	27	66	(Angola) Primeiro de Agosto
12	GK	Cristina Branco	15 March 1985 (aged 32)	1.70 m	66	0	(Angola) Primeiro de Agosto
13	RW	Natália Kamalandua	25 December 1998 (aged 18)	1.70 m	7	3	(Angola) Petro de Luanda
14	P	Ríssia Oliveira	23 April 1995 (aged 22)	1.80 m	7	3	(Angola) Petro de Luanda
15	RB	Azenaide Carlos	14 June 1990 (aged 27)	1.75 m	63	199	(Angola) Petro de Luanda
16	GK	Marta Alberto	10 February 1995 (aged 22)	1.80 m	4	0	(Angola) Primeiro de Agosto
17	CB	Dalva Peres	6 August 1996 (aged 21)	1.75 m	7	5	(Angola) Primeiro de Agosto
21	LB	Magda Cazanga	28 May 1991 (aged 26)	1.84 m	34	58	(Angola) Petro de Luanda
31	LW	Janete dos Santos	10 June 1991 (aged 26)	1.75 m	24	10	(Angola) Progresso do Sambizanga
90	LB	Isabel Guialo	8 April 1990 (aged 27)	1.72 m	46	120	(Angola) Primeiro de Agosto

=== France ===
A 21-player squad was announced on 20 November 2017. The final squad was revealed on 1 December 2017. On 9 December 2017, Astride N'Gouan replaced Orlane Kanor. The change was reversed six days later.

Head coach: Olivier Krumbholz

No.	Pos.	Name	Date of birth (age)	Height	App.	Goals	Club
3	RW	Blandine Dancette	14 February 1988 (aged 29)	1.69 m	91	112	(France) Nantes
5	RB	Camille Ayglon	21 May 1985 (aged 32)	1.80 m	237	411	(Romania) CSM București
7	CB	Allison Pineau	2 May 1989 (aged 28)	1.81 m	206	544	(France) Brest Bretagne
8	P	Laurisa Landre	27 October 1985 (aged 32)	1.74 m	72	114	(France) Metz Handball
9	P	Astride N'Gouan	9 July 1991 (aged 26)	1.87 m	13	26	(France) Brest Bretagne
10	CB	Grâce Zaadi	7 July 1993 (aged 24)	1.71 m	76	146	(France) Metz Handball
12	GK	Amandine Leynaud	2 May 1988 (aged 29)	1.78 m	202	2	(North Macedonia) HC Vardar
13	LW	Manon Houette	2 July 1992 (aged 25)	1.68 m	61	127	(France) Metz Handball
14	LB	Kalidiatou Niakaté	15 March 1995 (aged 22)	1.77 m	9	12	(France) Nantes
16	GK	Cléopâtre Darleux	1 June 1989 (aged 28)	1.76 m	140	3	(France) Brest Bretagne
17	LW	Siraba Dembélé	28 June 1986 (aged 31)	1.72 m	246	771	(Russia) Rostov-Don
20	RW	Laura Flippes	13 December 1994 (aged 22)	1.71 m	24	30	(France) Metz Handball
21	LB	Orlane Kanor	16 June 1997 (aged 20)	1.78 m	4	2	(France) Metz Handball
24	P	Béatrice Edwige	3 October 1988 (aged 29)	1.82 m	62	32	(France) Metz Handball
27	LB	Estelle Nze Minko	11 August 1991 (aged 26)	1.78 m	70	129	(Hungary) Siófok KC
29	CB	Gnonsiane Niombla	9 July 1990 (aged 27)	1.72 m	78	188	(Romania) CSM București
64	RB	Alexandra Lacrabère	27 April 1987 (aged 30)	1.77 m	200	667	(North Macedonia) HC Vardar

=== Paraguay ===
Head coach: Neri Vera

No.	Pos.	Name	Date of birth (age)	Height	App.	Goals	Club
1	GK	Alicia Villalba	28 February 1989 (aged 28)	1.71 m	150	0	(Paraguay) San José Handball
2	LB	Fátima Acuña	14 August 1999 (aged 18)	1.80 m	125	40	(Paraguay) Nueva Estrella
3	P	Luz Genes	2 February 1984 (aged 33)	1.85 m	132	28	(Paraguay) Club Cerro Porteño
4	CB	Fernanda Insfrán	7 February 1998 (aged 19)	1.56 m	150	60	(Spain) Mavi Nuevas Tecnologías
5	RW	Kamila Rolon	5 July 1994 (aged 23)	1.69 m	150	60	(Paraguay) San José Handball
6	P	Sabrina Fiore	17 April 1996 (aged 21)	1.75 m	150	56	(Brazil) UnC Concórdia
7	P	Karina dos Santos	1 April 1985 (aged 32)	1.80 m	150	54	(Paraguay) San José Handball
8	LB	María Paula Fernández	30 August 1998 (aged 19)	1.54 m	125	30	(Paraguay) Club Cerro Porteño
9	CB	Marizza Faría	20 August 1983 (aged 34)	1.67 m	173	73	(Spain) Mavi Nuevas Tecnologías
10	CB	Giovanna Goroso	2 June 1998 (aged 19)	1.66 m	0	0	(Paraguay) Club Cerro Porteño
11	CB	Delyne Leiva	27 March 1998 (aged 19)	1.59 m	125	40	(Paraguay) Club Cerro Porteño
12	GK	Analia Yaryes	9 May 1993 (aged 24)	1.75 m	150	0	(Paraguay) Club Cerro Porteño
13	LW	Georginna Battaglia	15 February 1995 (aged 22)	1.73 m	98	42	(Paraguay) Atlántida Sport Club
14	RW	Leticia Martínez	21 December 1988 (aged 28)	1.75 m	151	48	(Paraguay) San Lorenzo BM
15	LW	Ana Acuña	5 May 1994 (aged 23)	1.82 m	150	58	(Paraguay) Nueva Estrella
17	RW	Gisela González	16 April 1997 (aged 20)	1.69 m	148	31	(Paraguay) Club Cerro Porteño

=== Romania ===
A 20-player squad was announced on 10 November 2017. The final squad was revealed on 26 November 2017. Gabriella Szűcs replaced Mădălina Zamfirescu on 8 December 2017.

Head coach: Ambros Martín

No.	Pos.	Name	Date of birth (age)	Height	App.	Goals	Club
2	RW	Aneta Udriștioiu	22 June 1989 (aged 28)	1.65 m	25	39	(Romania) CSM București
3	LB	Gabriella Szűcs	31 August 1984 (aged 33)	1.83 m	21	10	(Romania) HC Dunărea Brăila
5	RB	Melinda Geiger	28 March 1987 (aged 30)	1.74 m	95	117	(France) Brest Bretagne Handball
7	CB	Eliza Buceschi	31 August 1993 (aged 24)	1.77 m	53	146	(Romania) Corona Brașov
8	LB	Cristina Neagu	26 August 1988 (aged 29)	1.80 m	160	697	(Romania) CSM București
13	CB	Cristina Laslo	10 April 1996 (aged 21)	1.77 m	17	19	(Montenegro) ŽRK Budućnost Podgorica
14	LW	Ana Maria Popa	25 February 1990 (aged 27)	1.75 m	14	21	(Romania) CSM Roman
15	LW	Valentina Ardean-Elisei	5 June 1982 (aged 35)	1.71 m	218	863	(Romania) S.C.M. Craiova
16	GK	Denisa Dedu	27 September 1994 (aged 23)	1.81 m	26	2	(Hungary) Siófok KC
19	LB	Cristina Florianu	29 September 1989 (aged 28)	1.84 m	19	29	(Romania) S.C.M. Craiova
20	GK	Yuliya Dumanska	15 August 1996 (aged 21)	1.78 m	14	0	(Romania) S.C.M. Craiova
21	P	Crina Pintea	3 April 1990 (aged 27)	1.92 m	39	61	(France) Issy-Paris Hand
23	RW	Ana Maria Berbece	23 July 1999 (aged 18)	1.71 m	0	0	(Romania) Universitatea Cluj-Napoca
25	P	Cynthia Tomescu	30 July 1991 (aged 26)	1.80 m	9	6	(Romania) Corona Brașov
31	CB	Mădălina Zamfirescu	31 October 1994 (aged 23)	1.80 m	21	37	(Hungary) Debrecen VSC
33	P	Timea Tătar	28 July 1989 (aged 28)	1.70 m	4	3	(Romania) Corona Brașov
90	RB	Ana Maria Dragut	24 February 1990 (aged 27)	1.86 m	6	12	(Romania) HC Zalău

=== Slovenia ===
A 19-player squad was announced on 20 November 2017. The final roster was revealed on 30 November 2017.

Head coach: Uroš Bregar

No.	Pos.	Name	Date of birth (age)	Height	App.	Goals	Club
3	LB	Teja Ferfolja	20 September 1991 (aged 26)	1.83 m	34	18	(Romania) CSM Roman
5	CB	Tjaša Rudman	16 August 1996 (aged 21)	1.67 m	2	1	(Slovenia) ŽRK Mlinotest Ajdovščina
6	RB	Ana Gros	21 January 1991 (aged 26)	1.86 m	77	302	(France) Metz Handball
9	CB	Nina Žabjek	4 March 1998 (aged 19)	1.78 m	2	0	(Slovenia) RK Krim
10	CB	Tjaša Stanko	5 November 1997 (aged 20)	1.73 m	28	78	(Slovenia) RK Krim
11	LB	Ana Abina	30 July 1997 (aged 20)	1.75 m	6	5	(Slovenia) RK Krim
18	CB	Nina Zulić	4 December 1995 (aged 21)	1.70 m	13	16	(Slovenia) RK Krim
19	RW	Neli Irman	7 April 1986 (aged 31)	1.73 m	93	230	(Switzerland) Spono Eagles
20	RW	Alja Koren	11 December 1990 (aged 26)	1.85 m	41	75	(Slovenia) RK Krim
21	GK	Amra Pandžić	20 September 1989 (aged 28)	1.78 m	25	0	(Slovenia) RK Krim
24	LB	Hana Vučko	14 November 1998 (aged 19)	1.75 m	1	0	(Slovenia) RK Krim
27	P	Alja Vrček	10 August 1993 (aged 24)	1.68 m	7	10	(Slovenia) MRK Krka
30	GK	Maja Vojnović	26 January 1998 (aged 19)	1.80 m	4	0	(Slovenia) MRK Krka
32	P	Lina Krhlikar	29 June 1989 (aged 28)	1.84 m	44	84	(Germany) Frisch Auf Göppingen
41	P	Aneja Beganovič	9 November 1997 (aged 20)	1.73 m	4	0	(Slovenia) RK Krim
71	LW	Ines Amon	13 July 1992 (aged 25)	1.71 m	7	4	(Slovenia) RK Krim

=== Spain ===
The squad was announced on 3 November 2017, before Seynabou Mbengue was added on 27 November 2017. The final squad was revealed on 1 December 2017.

Head coach: Carlos Viver

No.	Pos.	Name	Date of birth (age)	Height	App.	Goals	Club
4	RW	Carmen Martín	29 May 1988 (aged 29)	1.72 m	200	682	(France) OGC Nice Côte d'Azur
5	P	María Núñez	27 November 1988 (aged 29)	1.72 m	49	23	(France) ESBF Besançon
8	CB	Silvia Arderíus	11 July 1990 (aged 27)	1.68 m	9	19	(Spain) Super Amara Bera Bera
12	GK	Silvia Navarro	20 March 1979 (aged 38)	1.67 m	168	3	(Spain) Gran Canaria
14	P	Elisabeth Chávez	17 November 1990 (aged 27)	1.92 m	178	126	(France) Nantes Loire Atlantique
17	LW	Jennifer Gutiérrez Bermejo	20 February 1995 (aged 22)	1.69 m	7	7	(Spain) Mecalia Atlético Guardés
18	RW	Maitane Etxeberria	15 January 1997 (aged 20)	1.68 m	7	6	(Spain) Super Amara Bera Bera
19	P	Paula García Ávila	15 January 1997 (aged 20)	1.80 m	7	8	(Spain) Rincón Fertilidad Málaga
20	LW	Amaia González	27 February 1994 (aged 23)	1.67 m	27	41	(Spain) Prosetecnisa BM Zuazo
25	CB	Nerea Pena	13 December 1989 (aged 27)	1.75 m	125	400	(Hungary) FTC-Rail Cargo Hungaria
27	LB	Lara González Ortega	22 February 1992 (aged 25)	1.84 m	80	72	(Denmark) Team Esbjerg
32	RB	Mireya González	18 July 1991 (aged 26)	1.78 m	39	50	(Hungary) Érdi VSE
39	RB	Almudena Rodríguez	9 November 1993 (aged 24)	1.75 m	20	24	(Romania) CSM Bistrița
42	LB	Ivet Musons	17 June 1993 (aged 24)	1.67 m	7	14	(Spain) CB Elche Mustang
48	GK	Darly de Paula	25 August 1982 (aged 35)	1.78 m	45	0	(Montenegro) ŽRK Budućnost Podgorica
86	LB	Alexandrina Barbosa	5 May 1986 (aged 31)	1.75 m	94	448	(Russia) Rostov-Don

== Group B ==
=== Argentina ===
The squad was announced on 9 November 2017.

Head coach: Eduardo Peruchena

No.	Pos.	Name	Date of birth (age)	Height	App.	Goals	Club
1	GK	Marisol Carratu	15 July 1986 (aged 31)	1.79 m	106	2	(Spain) Atlético Guardés
2	P	María de Uriarte	7 June 1992 (aged 25)	1.70 m	18	35	(Argentina) Argentinos Juniors
3	RB	Xoana Iacoi	3 June 1992 (aged 25)	1.64 m	29	43	(Argentina) Cideco Handball
4	RW	Rosario Urban	13 March 1997 (aged 20)	1.68 m	39	80	(Spain) Atlético Guardés
5	LB	Manuela Pizzo	13 November 1992 (aged 25)	1.78 m	94	273	(Spain) BM Remudas
6	LW	Luciana Salvadó	3 April 1990 (aged 27)	1.69 m	111	339	(Argentina) Club Oeste
8	RW	Camila Bonazzola	21 May 1996 (aged 21)	1.70 m	39	82	(Argentina) MUN/VTE
9	RB	Luciana Mendoza	14 March 1990 (aged 27)	1.70 m	108	399	(Spain) Atlético Guardés
10	CB	Victoria Crivelli	30 September 1990 (aged 27)	1.75 m	99	171	(Argentina) Ferro Carril Oeste
12	GK	Nadia Bordon	11 August 1988 (aged 29)	1.79 m	68	1	(Argentina) CA Lanús
13	P	Giuliana Gavilan	7 March 1996 (aged 21)	1.76 m	34	58	(Argentina) CBA
18	RB	Macarena Sans	20 November 1996 (aged 21)	1.64 m	52	100	(Argentina) Mendoza de Regatas
19	LB	Florencia Ponce De Leon	26 February 1992 (aged 25)	1.79 m	41	75	(Argentina) Club Oeste
21	LB	Macarena Gandulfo	3 November 1993 (aged 24)	1.76 m	74	162	(Spain) Rincon Feritilidad Malaga
22	CB	Elke Karsten	15 May 1995 (aged 22)	1.77 m	41	142	(Spain) BM Bera Bera
25	CB	Micaela Casasola	17 March 1997 (aged 20)	1.77 m	39	101	(Argentina) Vélez Sarsfield

=== Czech Republic ===
An 18-player squad was announced on 25 November 2017. The final squad was revealed on 29 November 2017.

Head coach: Jan Bašný

No.	Pos.	Name	Date of birth (age)	Height	App.	Goals	Club
6	RB	Veronika Galušková	30 July 1998 (aged 19)	1.76 m	7	13	(Czech Republic) DHC Slavia Prague
7	RB	Helena Ryšánková	19 November 1992 (aged 25)	1.75 m	25	21	(France) Cercle Dijon Bourgogne
9	LW	Kristýna Salčáková	13 August 1987 (aged 30)	1.63 m	116	157	(France) Achenheim Truchtersheim
10	CB	Petra Růčková	8 February 1989 (aged 28)	1.73 m	114	109	(Czech Republic) DHK Baník Most
14	LB	Kamila Kordovská	4 December 1997 (aged 19)	1.79 m	24	53	(Germany) HSG Blomberg-Lippe
15	RB	Michaela Hrbková	14 July 1987 (aged 30)	1.70 m	131	317	(Germany) Frisch Auf Göppingen
16	GK	Lucie Satrapová	3 July 1989 (aged 28)	1.83 m	87	0	(Sweden) Kristianstad Handboll
18	CB	Iveta Luzumová	3 April 1989 (aged 28)	1.76 m	86	322	(Germany) Thüringer HC
27	P	Petra Adámková	21 June 1991 (aged 26)	1.70 m	45	56	(Germany) Frisch Auf Göppingen
28	CB	Šárka Marčíková	12 March 1992 (aged 25)	1.76 m	34	25	(Poland) Pogoń Baltica Szczecin
30	GK	Dominika Müllnerová	26 March 1992 (aged 25)	1.70 m	45	1	(Czech Republic) DHK Baník Most
31	P	Alena Stellnerová	22 August 1989 (aged 28)	1.70 m	35	31	(Czech Republic) DHC Slavia Prague
33	GK	Petra Kudláčková	17 October 1994 (aged 23)	1.73 m	13	1	(Czech Republic) DHC Slavia Prague
44	RW	Dominika Zachová	4 June 1996 (aged 21)	1.75 m	4	2	(Czech Republic) DHK Baník Most
51	LB	Markéta Jeřábková	8 February 1996 (aged 21)	1.74 m	33	110	(Czech Republic) DHK Baník Most
67	LW	Veronika Malá	6 May 1994 (aged 23)	1.70 m	35	90	(France) Issy-Paris Hand

=== Hungary ===
A 19-player squad was announced on 10 November 2017. The final squad was revealed on 29 November 2017. Zita Szucsánszki was called up on 6 December 2017.

Head coach: Kim Rasmussen

No.	Pos.	Name	Date of birth (age)	Height	App.	Goals	Club
2	LB	Szandra Szöllősi-Zácsik	22 April 1990 (aged 27)	1.83 m	50	166	(Hungary) Budaörs Handball
6	LW	Nadine Schatzl	19 November 1993 (aged 24)	1.73 m	26	57	(Hungary) FTC-Rail Cargo Hungaria
7	LB	Zita Szucsánszki	22 May 1987 (aged 30)	1.72 m	133	408	(Hungary) FTC-Rail Cargo Hungaria
8	CB	Anikó Kovacsics	29 August 1991 (aged 26)	1.70 m	94	178	(Hungary) FTC-Rail Cargo Hungaria
13	CB	Anita Görbicz	13 May 1983 (aged 34)	1.73 m	227	1095	(Hungary) Győri ETO
14	P	Anett Kisfaludy	31 August 1990 (aged 27)	1.82 m	22	25	(Hungary) Érdi VSE
15	LB	Kinga Klivinyi	31 March 1992 (aged 25)	1.78 m	47	103	(Hungary) Érdi VSE
16	GK	Blanka Bíró	22 September 1994 (aged 23)	1.8§ m	39	1	(Hungary) FTC-Rail Cargo Hungaria
22	RW	Bernadett Bódi	9 March 1986 (aged 31)	1.75 m	134	239	(Hungary) Győri ETO
23	LB	Klára Szekeres	1 December 1987 (aged 30)	1.83 m	85	30	(Hungary) Ferencvárosi TC
24	P	Szabina Mayer	24 March 1988 (aged 29)	1.70 m	44	60	(Hungary) Alba Fehérvár KC
33	RB	Anna Kovács	24 October 1991 (aged 26)	1.73 m	23	71	(Hungary) Dunaújvárosi
34	P	Rea Mészáros	14 April 1994 (aged 23)	1.72 m	32	6	(Hungary) FTC-Rail Cargo Hungaria
45	RB	Noémi Háfra	5 October 1998 (aged 19)	1.80 m	5	8	(Hungary) FTC-Rail Cargo Hungaria
61	GK	Kinga Janurik	6 November 1991 (aged 26)	1.76 m	16	1	(Hungary) Érdi VSE
66	RW	Viktória Lukács	31 January 1995 (aged 22)	1.69 m	19	30	(Hungary) FTC-Rail Cargo Hungaria
96	CB	Gabriella Tóth	23 September 1996 (aged 21)	1.75 m	19	43	(Hungary) Érdi VSE

=== Norway ===
The squad was announced on 7 November 2017. On 17 December 2017, Silje Solberg replaced Helene Gigstad Fauske in the squad.

Head coach: Thorir Hergeirsson

No.	Pos.	Name	Date of birth (age)	Height	App.	Goals	Club
1	GK	Kari Aalvik Grimsbø	4 January 1985 (aged 32)	1.80 m	162	1	(Hungary) Győri Audi ETO KC
3	CB	Emilie Hegh Arntzen	1 January 1994 (aged 23)	1.83 m	61	75	(Norway) Vipers Kristiansand
4	LB	Veronica Kristiansen	10 July 1990 (aged 27)	1.75 m	102	322	(Denmark) FC Midtylland
6	P	Heidi Løke	12 December 1982 (aged 34)	1.73 m	177	668	(Norway) Storhamar HE
7	RW	Stine Skogrand	3 March 1993 (aged 24)	1.73 m	54	84	(Denmark) Silkeborg/Voel KFUM
8	P	Vilde Ingstad	18 December 1994 (aged 22)	1.78 m	44	34	(Denmark) Team Esbjerg
9	RB	Nora Mørk	5 April 1991 (aged 26)	1.69 m	105	494	(Hungary) Győri Audi ETO KC
10	CB	Stine Bredal Oftedal	25 September 1991 (aged 26)	1.68 m	144	323	(Hungary) Győri Audi ETO KC
12	GK	Silje Solberg	16 June 1990 (aged 27)	1.78 m	107	0	(France) Issy-Paris Hand
13	P	Kari Brattset	15 February 1991 (aged 26)	1.83 m	16	40	(Norway) Vipers Kristiansand
16	GK	Katrine Lunde	30 March 1980 (aged 37)	1.80 m	268	3	(Norway) Vipers Kristiansand
17	LB	Helene Gigstad Fauske	31 January 1997 (aged 20)	1.76 m	5	1	(Denmark) FC Midtylland
18	CB	Emilie Christensen	13 April 1993 (aged 24)	1.76 m	3	0	(Norway) Larvik HK
22	RB	Amanda Kurtović	25 July 1991 (aged 26)	1.75 m	97	244	(Romania) CSM Bucharest
23	LW	Camilla Herrem	8 October 1986 (aged 31)	1.66 m	214	577	(Norway) Sola HK
24	LW	Sanna Solberg	16 June 1990 (aged 27)	1.78 m	100	164	(Denmark) Team Esbjerg
27	RW	Marit Røsberg Jacobsen	25 February 1994 (aged 23)	1.69 m	14	24	(Norway) Byåsen HE

=== Poland ===
An 18-player squad was announced on 21 November 2017. The final squad was revealed on 1 December 2017. On 7 December 2017, Monika Michałów was called up. Hanna Rycharska replaced Joanna Drabik on 10 December 2017.

Head coach: Leszek Krowicki

No.	Pos.	Name	Date of birth (age)	Height	App.	Goals	Club
4	RW	Adrianna Górna	22 March 1996 (aged 21)	1.70 m	4	4	(Poland) MKS Zagłębie Lubin
5	LB	Monika Michałów	22 December 1988 (aged 28)	1.90 m	24	41	(Poland) AZS Politechnika Koszalin
8	RB	Monika Kobylińska	9 April 1995 (aged 22)	1.77 m	37	111	(Germany) TuS Metzingen
10	CB	Romana Roszak	1 October 1994 (aged 23)	1.75 m	14	35	(Poland) AZS Politechnika Koszalin
11	LW	Kinga Grzyb	12 January 1982 (aged 35)	1.68 m	235	604	(Poland) MKS Zagłębie Lubin
12	GK	Weronika Gawlik	12 October 1986 (aged 31)	1.80 m	70	4	(Poland) SPR Lublin SSA
14	LB	Karolina Kudłacz-Gloc	17 January 1985 (aged 32)	1.77 m	164	840	(Germany) SG BBM Bietigheim
15	RW	Katarzyna Janiszewska	26 October 1995 (aged 22)	1.68 m	41	51	(Poland) GTPR Gdynia
16	GK	Adrianna Płaczek	10 December 1993 (aged 23)	1.74 m	17	0	(France) Fleury Loiret HB
17	LW	Daria Zawistowska	12 December 1995 (aged 21)	1.71 m	7	15	(Poland) Pogoń Baltica Szczecin
18	RB	Aleksandra Zych	28 July 1993 (aged 24)	1.86 m	45	49	(Poland) GTPR Gdynia
20	P	Joanna Drabik	28 October 1993 (aged 24)	1.80 m	52	78	(Poland) SPR Lublin SSA
24	LB	Joanna Kozłowska	19 January 1995 (aged 22)	1.84 m	19	11	(Poland) GTPR Gdynia
27	P	Hanna Rycharska	1 July 1988 (aged 29)	1.85 m	13	13	(Poland) AZS Politechnika Koszalin
31	LB	Sylwia Lisewska	31 May 1986 (aged 31)	1.84 m	20	39	(Poland) EB Start Elbląg
66	P	Joanna Szarawaga	2 April 1994 (aged 23)	1.85 m	15	21	(Poland) GTPR Gdynia
89	CB	Kinga Achruk	9 January 1989 (aged 28)	1.81 m	160	412	(Poland) SPR Lublin SSA
92	RB	Ewa Urtnowska	18 January 1992 (aged 25)	1.82 m	20	22	(France) Toulon Saint-Cyr Var Handball

=== Sweden ===
The squad was announced on 2 November 2017. On 2 December 2017, Louise Sand was taken out of the squad due to an injury, but was added back a day later.

Head coach: Henrik Signell

No.	Pos.	Name	Date of birth (age)	Height	App.	Goals	Club
1	GK	Johanna Bundsen	3 June 1991 (aged 26)	1.85 m	60	0	(Denmark) København Håndbold
2	P	Ulrika Toft Hansen	13 July 1987 (aged 30)	1.77 m	79	123	(Denmark) Team Esbjerg
4	LW	Olivia Mellegård	17 June 1996 (aged 21)	1.78 m	19	33	(Sweden) IK Sävehof
5	RW	Emma Ekenman-Fernis	24 July 1996 (aged 21)	1.72 m	19	35	(Sweden) IK Sävehof
6	LB	Carin Strömberg	10 July 1993 (aged 24)	1.84 m	43	36	(Denmark) Viborg HK
8	LB	Jamina Roberts	28 May 1990 (aged 27)	1.76 m	125	231	(Hungary) Érdi VSE
9	LW	Louise Sand	27 December 1992 (aged 24)	1.64 m	82	188	(France) Brest Bretagne Handball
11	RW	Daniela Gustin	11 May 1994 (aged 23)	1.81 m	10	22	(Denmark) Randers HK
12	GK	Filippa Idéhn	15 August 1990 (aged 27)	1.83 m	81	2	(France) Brest Bretagne Handball
14	LB	Johanna Westberg	6 April 1990 (aged 27)	1.86 m	49	73	(Denmark) Nykøbing Falster
19	P	Anna Lagerquist	16 October 1993 (aged 24)	1.73 m	17	18	(Denmark) Nykøbing Falster
20	CB	Isabelle Gulldén	29 June 1989 (aged 28)	1.77 m	179	695	(Romania) CSM București
22	RB	Hanna Blomstrand	25 August 1996 (aged 21)	1.73 m	24	28	(Denmark) København Håndbold
24	RB	Nathalie Hagman	19 July 1991 (aged 26)	1.67 m	112	309	(Romania) CSM București
27	RB	Sabina Jacobsen	24 March 1989 (aged 28)	1.80 m	108	132	(Romania) CSM București
29	LB	Jenny Alm	10 April 1989 (aged 28)	1.84 m	99	246	(Denmark) København Håndbold

== Group C ==
=== Brazil ===
A 17-player squad was announced on 9 November 2017. The final squad was revealed on 1 December 2017. On 5 December 2017, Deonise Fachinello was added to squad, replacing Gabriela Moreschi.

Head coach: Jorge Dueñas

No.	Pos.	Name	Date of birth (age)	Height	App.	Goals	Club
1	GK	Gabriela Moreschi	8 July 1994 (aged 23)	1.90 m	12	0	(Norway) Larvik HK
4	LW	Samira Rocha	26 January 1989 (aged 28)	1.70 m	114	302	(Hungary) Kisvárdai KC
5	CB	Danielle Joia	22 May 1990 (aged 27)	1.80 m	15	14	(Brazil) EC Pinheiros
7	P	Tamires Morena Lima	16 May 1994 (aged 23)	1.83 m	61	62	(Norway) Larvik HK
9	CB	Ana Paula Belo	18 October 1987 (aged 30)	1.72 m	163	609	(Russia) Rostov-Don
10	RW	Jéssica Quintino	17 April 1991 (aged 26)	1.72 m	109	273	(Denmark) HC Odense
11	P	Tamires Anselmo	2 May 1990 (aged 27)	1.70 m	15	27	(Brazil) EC Pinheiros
12	GK	Bárbara Arenhart	4 October 1986 (aged 31)	1.82 m	126	8	(Hungary) Váci NKSE
13	P	Lígia Costa	14 March 1996 (aged 21)	1.90 m	14	15	(Poland) GTPR Gdynia
18	LB	Eduarda Amorim	23 September 1986 (aged 31)	1.86 m	167	549	(Hungary) Győri ETO
23	LW	Dayane Rocha	24 March 1991 (aged 26)	1.69 m	42	49	(Brazil) São Bernardo
49	CB	Patricia Matieli	11 November 1998 (aged 19)	1.68 m	4	3	(Poland) GTPR Gdynia
81	RB	Deonise Fachinello	20 June 1983 (aged 34)	1.80 m	166	372	(Romania) CS Măgura Cisnădie
84	GK	Mayssa Pessoa	11 September 1984 (aged 33)	1.80 m	87	0	(Russia) Rostov-Don
88	RW	Mariana Costa	14 October 1992 (aged 25)	1.66 m	22	48	(Romania) CS Măgura Cisnădie
90	LB	Karoline de Souza	24 April 1990 (aged 27)	1.81 m	53	38	(Hungary) Váci NKSE
92	RB	Patricia Batista da Silva	8 April 1992 (aged 25)	1.75 m	39	73	(Germany) Thüringer HC

=== Denmark ===
A 28-player squad was announced on 31 October 2017. The final squad was revealed on 8 November 2017. On 15 November 2017, Rikke Iversen replaced Stine Bodholt Nielsen who had to withdraw from the squad due to an injury. On 30 November 2017, Simone Böhme was added to the squad as Trine Østergaard still hasn't recovered from an injury, leaving Rikke Iversen out of the squad. On 6 December 2017, Trine Østergaard was added back in the squad. On 9 December 2017, Stine Bodholt Nielsen replaced Kristina Kristiansen.

Head coach: Klavs Bruun Jørgensen

No.	Pos.	Name	Date of birth (age)	Height	App.	Goals	Club
1	GK	Sandra Toft Galsgaard	18 October 1989 (aged 28)	1.76 m	86	0	(Denmark) Team Esbjerg
5	P	Sarah Iversen	10 April 1990 (aged 27)	1.77 m	15	21	(Denmark) Nykøbing Falster Håndboldklub
7	LW	Maria Fisker	3 October 1990 (aged 27)	1.70 m	89	217	(Denmark) Randers HK
9	LW	Fie Woller	17 September 1992 (aged 25)	1.76 m	37	59	(Germany) SG BBM Bietigheim
10	P	Kathrine Heindahl	26 March 1992 (aged 25)	1.85 m	35	59	(Denmark) Odense Håndbold
13	RW	Simone Böhme	17 August 1991 (aged 26)	1.69 m	13	12	(Hungary) Siófok KC
14	CB	Lotte Grigel	5 April 1991 (aged 26)	1.65 m	78	117	(Hungary) Debreceni VSC
17	P	Stine Bodholt Nielsen	8 November 1989 (aged 28)	1.76 m	40	68	(Denmark) Viborg HK
18	RB	Mette Tranborg	1 January 1996 (aged 21)	1.96 m	34	87	(Denmark) Odense Håndbold
19	RB	Line Jørgensen	31 December 1989 (aged 27)	1.86 m	138	338	(Romania) CSM Bucharest
21	CB	Kristina Kristiansen	13 July 1989 (aged 28)	1.63 m	150	377	(Denmark) Nykøbing Falster Håndboldklub
23	CB	Kristina Jørgensen	17 January 1998 (aged 19)	1.86 m	2	0	(Denmark) Viborg HK
25	RW	Trine Østergaard	17 October 1991 (aged 26)	1.65 m	84	125	(Denmark) Odense Håndbold
27	RB	Louise Burgaard	17 October 1992 (aged 25)	1.76 m	83	203	(Denmark) FC Midtjylland
28	LB	Stine Jørgensen	3 September 1990 (aged 27)	1.80 m	117	366	(Denmark) Odense Håndbold
31	LB	Line Haugsted	11 November 1994 (aged 23)	1.80 m	25	38	(Denmark) Viborg HK
40	GK	Althea Reinhardt	8 September 1996 (aged 21)	1.84 m	18	0	(Denmark) Odense Håndbold

=== Japan ===
Head coach: Ulrik Kirkely

No.	Pos.	Name	Date of birth (age)	Height	App.	Goals	Club
2	P	Mika Nagata	28 May 1994 (aged 23)	1.80 m	7	2	(Japan) Hokkoku Bank
3	P	Kaho Sunami	5 January 1993 (aged 24)	1.66 m	5	17	(Japan) Sony Semiconductor
4	RB	Yui Sunami	7 June 1991 (aged 26)	1.63 m	24	80	(Japan) Hokkoku Bank
5	LB	Sayo Shiota	21 March 1989 (aged 28)	1.72 m	25	34	(Japan) Hokkoku Bank
7	RW	Asuka Fujita	14 February 1996 (aged 21)	1.66 m	7	19	(Japan) Sony Semiconductor
9	CB	Aya Yokoshima	3 July 1990 (aged 27)	1.63 m	20	58	(Japan) Hokkoku Bank
12	GK	Minami Itano	2 February 1993 (aged 24)	1.73 m	0	0	(Japan) Hiroshima Maple Reds
13	LW	Chie Katsuren	14 April 1989 (aged 28)	1.58 m	25	60	(Japan) Omron
15	RB	Hitomi Tada	13 October 1991 (aged 26)	1.66 m	1	1	(Japan) MIE violet' IRIS
21	RW	Ayaka Ikehara	24 September 1990 (aged 27)	1.57 m	23	39	(Denmark) Nykøbing Falster Håndboldklub
24	CB	Nozomi Hara	9 March 1991 (aged 26)	1.70 m	45	102	(Japan) MIE violet' IRIS
25	CB	Mana Ohyama	7 December 1992 (aged 24)	1.64 m	5	18	(Japan) Hokkoku Bank
27	LB	Haruno Sasaki	26 February 1995 (aged 22)	1.72 m	0	0	(Japan) Hokkoku Bank
28	P	Shiori Nagata	24 October 1987 (aged 30)	1.71 m	65	42	(Japan) Omron
29	LW	Anri Matsumura	21 June 1991 (aged 26)	1.68 m	20	87	(Japan) Sony Semiconductor
30	GK	Sakura Hauge	7 January 1987 (aged 30)	1.74 m	16	0	(Norway) Vipers Kristiansand

=== Montenegro ===
An 18-player squad was announced on 20 November 2017.

Head coach: Per Johansson

No.	Pos.	Name	Date of birth (age)	Height	App.	Goals	Club
1	GK	Marina Rajčić	24 August 1993 (aged 24)	1.78 m	97	0	(France) Metz Handball
4	RW	Jovanka Radičević	17 October 1991 (aged 26)	1.69 m	134	709	(North Macedonia) ŽRK Vardar
9	LB	Đurđina Jauković	24 February 1997 (aged 20)	1.85 m	38	102	(Montenegro) ŽRK Budućnost
10	P	Tatjana Brnović	9 November 1998 (aged 19)	1.83 m	4	3	(Montenegro) ŽRK Budućnost
12	GK	Alma Hasanić Grizović	13 May 1989 (aged 28)	1.79 m	16	0	(Norway) Storhamar IL
15	RB	Andrea Klikovac	6 May 1991 (aged 26)	1.74 m	53	24	(North Macedonia) ŽRK Vardar
16	GK	Ljubica Nenezić	15 January 1997 (aged 20)	1.79 m	6	0	(Turkey) Kastamonu Bld. GSK
23	RW	Dijana Ujkić	5 July 1996 (aged 21)	1.72 m	10	24	(Montenegro) ŽRK Budućnost
25	RB	Đurđina Malović	5 May 1996 (aged 21)	1.82 m	20	20	(Montenegro) ŽRK Budućnost
27	RB	Sanja Premović	27 November 1992 (aged 25)	1.72 m	11	4	(Montenegro) ŽRK Budućnost
32	RB	Katarina Bulatović	15 November 1984 (aged 33)	1.86 m	69	394	(Russia) Rostov-Don
55	LW	Ivona Pavićević	21 April 1996 (aged 21)	1.67 m	24	12	(Montenegro) ŽRK Budućnost
66	P	Ema Ramusović	28 November 1996 (aged 21)	1.82 m	36	30	(Montenegro) ŽRK Budućnost
71	P	Bobana Klikovac	19 July 1995 (aged 22)	1.81 m	14	8	(Romania) SCM Craiova
80	LB	Jelena Despotović	30 April 1994 (aged 23)	1.83 m	54	38	(Slovenia) RK Krim
90	CB	Milena Raičević	12 March 1990 (aged 27)	1.78 m	129	380	(Montenegro) ŽRK Budućnost
96	LW	Itana Grbić	1 September 1996 (aged 21)	1.69 m	23	17	(Montenegro) ŽRK Budućnost

=== Russia ===
A 22-player squad was announced on 17 November 2017. On 20 November 2017, Elizaveta Malashenko replaced Victoria Zhilinskayte in the squad due to a pregnancy. On 27 November 2017, the squad was reduced to 18 players. The final squad was published on 2 December 2017. Ekaterina Matlashova replaced Yekaterina Ilyina on 11 December 2017. On 13 December 2017, Yekaterina Ilyina replaced Anastasiia Makina.

Head coach: Yevgeni Trefilov

No.	Pos.	Name	Date of birth (age)	Height	App.	Goals	Club
6	P	Ekaterina Matlashova	25 September 1994 (aged 23)	1.85 m	8	4	(Russia) HC Kuban Krasnodar
7	CB	Daria Dmitrieva	9 August 1995 (aged 22)	1.78 m	78	229	(Russia) Lada Togliatti
13	RB	Anna Vyakhireva	13 March 1995 (aged 22)	1.65 m	63	235	(Russia) Rostov-Don
18	LW	Daria Samokhina	12 August 1992 (aged 25)	1.75 m	24	58	(Russia) HC Astrakhanochka
19	P	Kseniya Makeyeva	19 September 1990 (aged 27)	1.85 m	115	213	(Russia) Rostov-Don
27	LB	Polina Vedekhina	6 January 1994 (aged 23)	1.77 m	27	44	(Russia) Lada Togliatti
29	GK	Elena Utkina	29 May 1990 (aged 27)	1.81 m	27	1	(Russia) Lada Togliatti
31	CB	Karina Sabirova	23 March 1998 (aged 19)	1.81 m	11	21	(Russia) HC Astrakhanochka
33	CB	Yekaterina Ilyina	7 March 1991 (aged 26)	1.77 m	91	244	(Russia) Rostov-Don
34	CB	Elizaveta Malashenko	26 February 1996 (aged 21)	1.80 m	24	28	(Russia) HC Astrakhanochka
36	RW	Yulia Managarova	27 September 1988 (aged 29)	1.66 m	8	25	(Russia) Rostov-Don
66	LB	Anna Kochetova	4 May 1987 (aged 30)	1.77 m	62	195	(Russia) HC Astrakhanochka
70	P	Maya Petrova	26 May 1982 (aged 35)	1.78 m	71	77	(Russia) Rostov-Don
88	GK	Victoriya Kalinina	8 December 1988 (aged 28)	1.83 m	76	0	(Russia) HC Kuban Krasnodar
93	RB	Anna Punko	27 March 1989 (aged 28)	1.83 m	41	70	(Hungary) Debreceni VSC
97	RW	Anastasiia Makina	10 December 1997 (aged 19)	1.67 m	7	5	(Russia) Dinamo Volgograd
98	LW	Yulia Markova	10 August 1996 (aged 21)	1.70 m	7	6	(Russia) Dinamo Volgograd

=== Tunisia ===
An 18-player squad was announced on 4 October 2017.

Head coach: Issam Lahyani

No.	Pos.	Name	Date of birth (age)	Height	App.	Goals	Club
5	RW	Aya Ben Abdallah	19 August 1997 (aged 20)	1.65 m	3	1	(Tunisia) Club Africain
7	LW	Fatma Bouri	9 January 1993 (aged 24)	1.79 m	3	4	(Tunisia) Club Africain
9	CB	Senda Chekir	19 July 1992 (aged 25)	1.78 m	11	15	(Tunisia) Megrine Sport HBF
10	RB	Amal Hamrouni	16 June 1995 (aged 22)	1.56 m	24	109	(Tunisia) ASF Sfax
11	LW	Boutheïna Amiche	12 September 1990 (aged 27)	1.72 m	20	26	(Tunisia) ASF Sfax
12	GK	Echraf Abdallah	14 January 1987 (aged 30)	1.81 m	45	0	(Tunisia) Megrine Sport HBF
14	P	Mouna Jlezi	22 June 1991 (aged 26)	1.73 m	10	32	(Tunisia) Club Africain
15	P	Rakia Rezgui	26 August 1996 (aged 21)	1.79 m	18	12	(Tunisia) Club Africain
16	GK	Fadia Omrani	27 February 1984 (aged 33)	1.71 m	67	0	(Tunisia) Club Africain
19	LB	Ines Jaouadi	15 September 1989 (aged 28)	1.82 m	99	235	(Tunisia) ASF Teboulba
20	CB	Mouna Chebbah	8 July 1982 (aged 35)	1.76 m	232	1006	(France) Chambray Touraine Handball
21	CB	Sondes Hachana	7 September 1996 (aged 21)	1.72 m	11	10	(Tunisia) ASF Teboulba
24	LB	Ines Khouildi	11 March 1985 (aged 32)	1.83 m	125	277	(Romania) HCM Râmnicu Vâlcea
25	RB	Oumayma Dardour	6 January 1996 (aged 21)	1.78 m	10	8	(Tunisia) Club Africain
44	P	Manel Kouki	4 February 1988 (aged 29)	1.80 m	88	191	(France) Stella Sports HB
99	CB	Takoua Chabchoub	10 March 1993 (aged 24)	1.72 m	14	22	(France) OGC Nice

== Group D ==
=== Cameroon ===
Head coach: Jean Zambo

No.	Pos.	Name	Date of birth (age)	Height	App.	Goals	Club
1	GK	Noelle Mben	5 January 1988 (aged 29)	1.76 m	50		(Turkey) Yenimahalle Bld. SK
2	LW	Anne Ngo	1 April 1984 (aged 33)	1.69 m	26		(Cameroon) FAP Yaoundé
3	CB	Pasma Nchouapouognigni	21 December 1992 (aged 24)	1.85 m	32		(Republic of the Congo) DGSP
4	CB	Genny Mahala	16 September 1992 (aged 25)	1.79 m	29		(Cameroon) FAP Yaoundé
5	P	Yvette Yuoh	7 July 1989 (aged 28)	1.88 m	6		(Cameroon) TKC
6	P	Jacqueline Mossy	29 July 1985 (aged 32)	1.72 m	90		(Cameroon) Dynamique De Bokito
7	CB	Vanessa Djiepmou	18 June 1990 (aged 27)	1.68 m	34		(Cameroon) FAP Yaoundé
8	CB	Morgane Ndongo	7 March 1993 (aged 24)	1.95 m	24		(Cameroon) FAP Yaoundé
10	RW	Yolande Touba	18 July 1993 (aged 24)	1.62 m	11		(Cameroon) Dynamique De Bokito
12	GK	Berthe Abiabakon	7 October 1988 (aged 29)	1.75 m	38		(France) La Roche-sur-Yon
14	P	Jasmine Yotchoum	2 December 1994 (aged 22)	1.86 m	18		(Cameroon) FAP Yaoundé
15	CB	Anne Essam	6 January 1992 (aged 25)	1.77 m	30		(Cameroon) FAP Yaoundé
16	GK	Linda Awu	18 July 1989 (aged 28)	1.72 m	16		(Cameroon) FAP Yaoundé
17	CB	Jacky Baniomo	16 April 1983 (aged 34)	1.72 m	35		(Cameroon) Usarsport
18	LB	Aubiege Njampou	8 May 1982 (aged 35)	1.74 m	60		(Cameroon) FAP Yaoundé
35	RB	Lisa Atangana	3 October 1997 (aged 20)	1.74 m	0	0	(France) Anglet Biarritz

=== China ===
Head coach: Jesper Holmris

No.	Pos.	Name	Date of birth (age)	Height	App.	Goals	Club
3	RW	Zhang Haixia	10 February 1995 (aged 22)	1.74 m	80	95	(China) Jiangsu Handball
5	LB	Ban Chenchen	6 June 1991 (aged 26)	1.85 m	20	5	(China) Anhui Handball
6	LB	Wei Baogui	20 March 1990 (aged 27)	1.79 m	30	15	(China) Guangdong Handball
7	LB	Li Xiaoqing	22 December 1995 (aged 21)	1.76 m	40	30	(China) Beijing Army Handball
8	P	Qiao Ru	5 January 1995 (aged 22)	1.83 m	90	100	(China) Jiangsu Handball
9	LW	Wu Nana	4 March 1990 (aged 27)	1.70 m	80	65	(China) Shanghai Handball
11	LW	Yu Yuanyuan	30 January 1995 (aged 22)	1.73 m	35	20	(China) Jiangsu Handball
13	RW	Si Wen	14 December 1990 (aged 26)	1.71 m	30	18	(China) Shanghai Handball
14	RB	Liu Xiaomei	2 May 1985 (aged 32)	1.78 m	150	210	(China) Anhui Handball
15	RB	Sun Mengying	11 April 1990 (aged 27)	1.77 m	100	130	(China) Shanghai Handball
16	GK	Wang Xiaohua	15 April 1993 (aged 24)	1.86 m	50	0	(China) Jiangsu Handball
18	P	Sha Zhengwen	18 June 1990 (aged 27)	1.90 m	100	130	(China) Shanghai Handball
19	P	Mo Mengmeng	6 January 1995 (aged 22)	1.80 m	10	8	(China) Jiangsu Handball
22	GK	Yang Yurou	16 July 1996 (aged 21)	1.86 m	25	0	(China) Anhui Handball
23	LB	Zhou Mengxue	20 February 2000 (aged 17)	1.75 m	10	5	(China) Anhui Handball
93	RW	Zhang Tingting	3 September 1996 (aged 21)	1.83 m	20	7	(China) Anhui Handball

=== Germany ===
A 28-player squad was announced on 1 November 2017. The final squad was revealed on 1 December 2017. On 3 December 2017, Alicia Stolle replaced due to an injury. Emily Bölk was added on 5 December 2017. Dinah Eckerle replaced Antje Lauenroth on 8 December 2017.

Head coach: Michael Biegler

No.	Pos.	Name	Date of birth (age)	Height	App.	Goals	Club
3	RB	Isabell Klein	28 June 1984 (aged 33)	1.72 m	86	99	(France) Nantes Handball
6	P	Jenny Karolius	24 May 1986 (aged 31)	1.81 m	16	27	(Germany) Bayer Leverkusen
10	CB	Anna Loerper	18 November 1984 (aged 33)	1.64 m	235	396	(Germany) TuS Metzingen
11	LB	Xenia Smits	22 April 1994 (aged 23)	1.82 m	32	77	(France) Metz Handball
12	GK	Katja Kramarczyk	18 March 1984 (aged 33)	1.78 m	133	0	(Germany) Bayer Leverkusen
13	P	Julia Behnke	28 March 1993 (aged 24)	1.80 m	40	48	(Germany) TuS Metzingen
15	CB	Kim Naidzinavicius	6 April 1991 (aged 26)	1.81 m	89	200	(Germany) SG BBM Bietigheim
16	GK	Clara Woltering	2 March 1983 (aged 34)	1.78 m	214	0	(Germany) Borussia Dortmund
20	RB	Emily Bölk	26 April 1998 (aged 19)	1.82 m	20	52	(Germany) Buxtehuder SV
21	LB	Nadja Månsson	22 September 1988 (aged 29)	1.86 m	72	235	(Germany) Borussia Dortmund
23	RW	Svenja Huber	23 October 1985 (aged 32)	1.68 m	74	152	(Germany) Borussia Dortmund
24	LW	Lone Fischer	8 September 1988 (aged 29)	1.65 m	40	82	(Germany) Buxtehuder SV
26	LW	Angie Geschke	24 May 1985 (aged 32)	1.77 m	90	162	(Germany) VfL Oldenburg
29	P	Antje Lauenroth	4 October 1988 (aged 29)	1.70 m	6	8	(Germany) SG BBM Bietigheim
31	CB	Kerstin Wohlbold	11 January 1984 (aged 33)	1.70 m	76	140	(Germany) Thüringer HC
36	GK	Dinah Eckerle	16 October 1995 (aged 22)	1.70 m	16	1	(Germany) Thüringer HC
37	RB	Alicia Stolle	17 June 1996 (aged 21)	1.80 m	19	13	(Germany) HSG Blomberg-Lippe
42	RB	Friederike Gubernatis	1 April 1988 (aged 29)	1.77 m	4	9	(Germany) Buxtehuder SV

=== Netherlands ===
The first 14 players were announced on 13 November 2017. The final squad was revealed on 28 November 2017. Pearl van der Wissel replaced Angela Steenbakkers on 9 December 2017.

Head coach: Helle Thomsen

No.	Pos.	Name	Date of birth (age)	Height	App.	Goals	Club
4	LW	Angela Steenbakkers	3 June 1994 (aged 23)	1.69 m	11	17	(Germany) HSG Blomberg-Lippe
5	LB	Jessy Kramer	16 February 1990 (aged 27)	1.77 m	110	91	(France) Toulon Handball
6	RB	Laura van der Heijden	27 June 1990 (aged 27)	1.72 m	174	555	(Hungary) FTC-Rail Cargo Hungaria
7	RW	Debbie Bont	9 December 1990 (aged 26)	1.74 m	130	252	(Denmark) København Håndbold
8	LB	Lois Abbingh	13 August 1992 (aged 25)	1.77 m	117	492	(France) Issy-Paris Hand
10	P	Danick Snelder	22 May 1990 (aged 27)	1.78 m	146	347	(Hungary) FTC-Rail Cargo Hungaria
11	CB	Lynn Knippenborg	7 January 1992 (aged 25)	1.75 m	77	104	(Germany) Buxtehuder SV
13	P	Yvette Broch	23 December 1990 (aged 26)	1.85 m	107	264	(Hungary) Győri ETO KC
17	CB	Nycke Groot	4 May 1988 (aged 29)	1.75 m	119	365	(Hungary) Győri ETO KC
18	LB	Kelly Dulfer	21 March 1994 (aged 23)	1.86 m	75	59	(Denmark) København Håndbold
23	GK	Jasmina Janković	6 December 1986 (aged 30)	1.68 m	82	4	(Germany) TuS Metzingen
24	LW	Martine Smeets	5 May 1990 (aged 27)	1.72 m	74	26	(Germany) SG BBM Bietigheim
25	RB	Charris Rozemalen	16 April 1991 (aged 26)	1.75 m	6	13	(Germany) SG BBM Bietigheim
26	RW	Angela Malestein	31 January 1993 (aged 24)	1.73 m	109	211	(Germany) SG BBM Bietigheim
28	CB	Pearl van der Wissel	14 April 1984 (aged 33)	1.71 m	217	560	(Denmark) Odense Håndbold
33	GK	Tess Wester	19 May 1993 (aged 24)	1.78 m	68	7	(Germany) SG BBM Bietigheim
79	LB	Estavana Polman	5 August 1992 (aged 25)	1.74 m	111	390	(Denmark) Team Esbjerg

=== Serbia ===
An 18-player squad was announced on 29 November 2017. The final squad was revealed on 2 December 2017.

Head coach: Ljubomir Obradović

No.	Pos.	Name	Date of birth (age)	Height	App.	Goals	Club
2	LW	Sanja Radosavljević	15 January 1994 (aged 23)	1.70 m	38	54	(Hungary) Váci NKSE
3	RW	Katarina Krpež Šlezak	2 May 1988 (aged 29)	1.68 m	120	301	(Hungary) Erd HC
7	CB	Andrea Lekić	6 September 1987 (aged 30)	1.78 m	96	481	(North Macedonia) HC Vardar
8	RB	Dijana Števin	23 October 1986 (aged 31)	1.78 m	66	128	(France) Celles Sur Belle
9	RB	Jelena Živković	6 July 1991 (aged 26)	1.84 m	79	150	(Hungary) Alba Fehérvár KC
11	LB	Sanja Damnjanović	25 May 1987 (aged 30)	1.81 m	111	440	(Hungary) Siófok KC
14	RW	Željka Nikolić	12 July 1991 (aged 26)	1.68 m	15	9	(Romania) SCM Craiova
18	CB	Tamara Georgijev	6 September 1992 (aged 25)	1.72 m	29	39	(Hungary) Kisvárdai KC
20	P	Slađana Pop-Lazić	26 July 1988 (aged 29)	1.78 m	71	122	(France) Brest Bretagne
21	LW	Dijana Radojević	2 April 1990 (aged 27)	1.70 m	12	12	(Turkey) Ankara Yenimahalle BSK
23	LB	Marija Obradović	6 August 1992 (aged 25)	1.82 m	9	12	(Germany) TuS Metzingen
27	GK	Katarina Tomašević	6 February 1984 (aged 33)	1.77 m	73	0	(Hungary) DKKA Dunaujvaros KA
33	LB	Jovana Stoiljković	30 September 1988 (aged 29)	1.82 m	70	153	(France) Brest Bretagne
72	P	Dragana Cvijić	15 March 1990 (aged 27)	1.84 m	72	205	(North Macedonia) HC Vardar
90	GK	Marija Čolić	12 April 1990 (aged 27)	1.73 m	11	0	(France) OGC Nice
99	RB	Marina Dmitrović	23 March 1985 (aged 32)	1.85 m	99	152	(Hungary) Kisvárdai KC

=== South Korea ===
An 18-player squad was used under a tournament in Norway in late November. The final squad was revealed on 2 December 2017. On 3 December 2017, Jung Ji-in replaced Gwon Han-na in the squad due to an injury. On 5 December 2017, Jeong Jin-hui replaced Gim Bo-eun in the squad due to an injury.

Head coach: Kang Jae-won

No.	Pos.	Name	Date of birth (age)	Height	App.	Goals	Club
2	RW	Kim Seon-hwa	7 January 1991 (aged 26)	1.60 m			(South Korea) SK Sugar Gliders
7	LW	Jo Ha-rang	15 July 1991 (aged 26)	1.65 m			(South Korea) Gwangju City
9	CB	Song Hye-soo	27 August 1999 (aged 18)	1.62 m			(South Korea) Incheon Business H.S
11	RB	Ryu Eun-hee	24 February 1990 (aged 27)	1.79 m	83	297	(South Korea) Busan
12	GK	Ju Hui	4 November 1989 (aged 28)	1.81 m			(South Korea) Seoul City
14	RB	Jung Ji-in	18 July 2000 (aged 17)	1.80 m			(South Korea) Baekyang H.S
15	LW	Choi Su-min	9 January 1990 (aged 27)	1.78 m	49	155	(South Korea) Seoul City
16	GK	Park Sae-young	11 August 1994 (aged 23)	1.75 m			(South Korea) Gyeong
17	LB	Sim Hae-in	31 October 1987 (aged 30)	1.78 m	64	117	(South Korea) Busan
18	LB	Kim Hee-jin	17 June 1995 (aged 22)	1.77 m			(South Korea) Incheon City
19	P	Kang Eun-hye	17 April 1996 (aged 21)	1.85 m			(South Korea) Korea National Sports University
21	CB	Song Ji-eun	4 September 1996 (aged 21)	1.70 m			(South Korea) Incheon City
22	RW	Song Ji-young	6 June 1996 (aged 21)	1.64 m			(South Korea) Seoul City
23	CB	Lee Mi-gyeong	2 October 1991 (aged 26)	1.70 m			(Japan) Hiroshima Maple Reds
24	LB	Gwon Han-na	22 November 1989 (aged 28)	1.73 m	77	211	(South Korea) Seoul City
28	P	Gim Bo-eun	8 December 1997 (aged 19)	1.76 m			(South Korea) Gyeong
29	RW	Yu So-jeong	4 June 1996 (aged 21)	1.68 m	19	71	(South Korea) SK Sugar Gliders
36	GK	Jeong Jin-hui	24 March 1999 (aged 18)	1.80 m			(South Korea) Il Shin Girls' H.S
