= 2016 Pan American Women's Club Handball Championship =

Tournament details
- Host country: Chile
- Venue(s): 1 (in 1 host city)
- Dates: 1–5 November
- Teams: 8 (from 1 confederation)

Final positions
- Champions: (Brazil) Metodista São Bernardo (1st title)
- Runners-up: (Argentina) Ferro Carril Oeste
- Third place: (Uruguay) Club Atlético Goes
- Fourth place: (Uruguay) BBC Layva

Tournament statistics
- Matches played: 20
- Goals scored: 963 (48.15 per match)
- Attendance: 5,610 (281 per match)
- Top scorer(s): (Chile) María José Letelier (39 goals)

The 2016 Pan American Women's Club Handball Championship was the first edition of the tournament organised by the Pan-American Team Handball Federation, and was held in Santiago, Chile 1–5 November.

== Participating teams ==
- (Argentina) Ferro Carril Oeste
- (Brazil) Metodista São Bernardo
- (Chile) Ovalle Balonmano
- (Chile) CH Santiago Morning
- (Paraguay) Deportivo San José
- (Paraguay) Nueva Estrella
- (Uruguay) BBC Layva
- (Uruguay) Club Atlético Goes

== Preliminary round ==
=== Group A ===
Team	Pld	W	D	L	GF	GA	GD	Pts
(Brazil) Metodista São Bernardo	3	3	0	0	114	49	65	6
(Uruguay) BBC Layva	3	2	0	1	74	66	8	4
(Paraguay) Nueva Estrella	3	1	0	2	60	94	–34	2
(Chile) CH Santiago Morning	3	0	0	3	58	97	–39	0

Teams qualified to the semi-finals

November 1; 15:30	Metodista São Bernardo (Brazil)	28–22	(Uruguay) BBC Layva	Centro de Entrenamiento Olímpico, Santiago; Attendance: 300; Referees: Ochatt, Hernalz (ARG)
November 1; 15:30	Coppi, Rocha 5	(13–9)	Fynn 7	Centro de Entrenamiento Olímpico, Santiago; Attendance: 300; Referees: Ochatt, Hernalz (ARG)
November 1; 15:30	2× (yellow card) 5× (suspension)	Report	2× (yellow card) 4× (suspension)	Centro de Entrenamiento Olímpico, Santiago; Attendance: 300; Referees: Ochatt, Hernalz (ARG)

November 1; 20:00	CH Santiago Morning (Chile)	25–28	(Paraguay) Nueva Estrella	Centro de Entrenamiento Olímpico, Santiago; Attendance: 600; Referees: Sosa, Lemes (URU)
November 1; 20:00	Letelier 12	(15–13)	Bordon 9	Centro de Entrenamiento Olímpico, Santiago; Attendance: 600; Referees: Sosa, Lemes (URU)
November 1; 20:00	2× (yellow card) 2× (suspension)	Report	3× (yellow card) 3× (suspension)	Centro de Entrenamiento Olímpico, Santiago; Attendance: 600; Referees: Sosa, Lemes (URU)

November 2; 16:00	Nueva Estrella (Paraguay)	14–45	(Brazil) Metodista São Bernardo	Centro de Entrenamiento Olímpico, Santiago; Attendance: 200; Referees: Moraga, Zavalla (CHI)
November 2; 16:00	F. Acuña 4	(9–19)	Santos 8	Centro de Entrenamiento Olímpico, Santiago; Attendance: 200; Referees: Moraga, Zavalla (CHI)
November 2; 16:00	5× (suspension)	Report	1× (yellow card) 4× (suspension)	Centro de Entrenamiento Olímpico, Santiago; Attendance: 200; Referees: Moraga, Zavalla (CHI)

November 2; 20:00	CH Santiago Morning (Chile)	20–28	(Uruguay) BBC Layva	Centro de Entrenamiento Olímpico, Santiago; Attendance: 250; Referees: Ochatt, Hernalz (ARG)
November 2; 20:00	Letelier 7	(10–10)	Falco, Dondan 5	Centro de Entrenamiento Olímpico, Santiago; Attendance: 250; Referees: Ochatt, Hernalz (ARG)
November 2; 20:00	1× (yellow card) 4× (suspension) 1× (red card)	Report	2× (yellow card) 6× (suspension)	Centro de Entrenamiento Olímpico, Santiago; Attendance: 250; Referees: Ochatt, Hernalz (ARG)

November 3; 16:00	Nueva Estrella (Paraguay)	18–24	(Uruguay) BBC Layva	Centro de Entrenamiento Olímpico, Santiago; Attendance: 50; Referees: Oliveira, Vilella (BRA)
November 3; 16:00	Bordon 4	(10–11)	Eastman 6	Centro de Entrenamiento Olímpico, Santiago; Attendance: 50; Referees: Oliveira, Vilella (BRA)
November 3; 16:00	1× (yellow card) 3× (suspension)	Report	2× (yellow card) 3× (suspension)	Centro de Entrenamiento Olímpico, Santiago; Attendance: 50; Referees: Oliveira, Vilella (BRA)

November 3; 20:00	Metodista São Bernardo (Brazil)	41–13	(Chile) CH Santiago Morning	Centro de Entrenamiento Olímpico, Santiago; Attendance: 350; Referees: Burgos, Delgado (ARG)
November 3; 20:00	Coppi 6	(22–5)	Letelier 7	Centro de Entrenamiento Olímpico, Santiago; Attendance: 350; Referees: Burgos, Delgado (ARG)
November 3; 20:00	3× (yellow card) 4× (suspension)	Report	1× (yellow card) 2× (suspension)	Centro de Entrenamiento Olímpico, Santiago; Attendance: 350; Referees: Burgos, Delgado (ARG)

=== Group B ===
Team	Pld	W	D	L	GF	GA	GD	Pts
(Argentina) Ferro Carril Oeste	3	3	0	0	89	59	30	6
(Uruguay) Club Atlético Goes	3	2	0	1	85	65	20	4
(Chile) Ovalle Balonmano	3	1	0	2	52	79	–27	2
(Paraguay) Deportivo San José	3	0	0	3	54	77	–23	0

Teams qualified to the semi-finals

November 1; 13:30	Ferro Carril Oeste (Argentina)	29–26	(Uruguay) Club Atlético Goes	Centro de Entrenamiento Olímpico, Santiago; Attendance: 100; Referees: Oliveira, Vilella (BRA)
November 1; 13:30	Salvadó, De Leon 5	(13–12)	Scarrone 7	Centro de Entrenamiento Olímpico, Santiago; Attendance: 100; Referees: Oliveira, Vilella (BRA)
November 1; 13:30	1× (yellow card) 7× (suspension)	Report	3× (yellow card) 4× (suspension)	Centro de Entrenamiento Olímpico, Santiago; Attendance: 100; Referees: Oliveira, Vilella (BRA)

November 1; 17:30	Ovalle Balonmano (Chile)	19–18	(Paraguay) Deportivo San José	Centro de Entrenamiento Olímpico, Santiago; Attendance: 500; Referees: Burgos, Delgado (ARG)
November 1; 17:30	Llanos 7	(11–8)	Feschenko 6	Centro de Entrenamiento Olímpico, Santiago; Attendance: 500; Referees: Burgos, Delgado (ARG)
November 1; 17:30	2× (yellow card) 2× (suspension)	Report	3× (yellow card) 2× (suspension)	Centro de Entrenamiento Olímpico, Santiago; Attendance: 500; Referees: Burgos, Delgado (ARG)

November 2; 14:00	Deportivo San José (Paraguay)	19–26	(Argentina) Ferro Carril Oeste	Centro de Entrenamiento Olímpico, Santiago; Attendance: 150; Referees: Sosa, Lemes (URU)
November 2; 14:00	Feschenko 5	(11–11)	Salvadó 8	Centro de Entrenamiento Olímpico, Santiago; Attendance: 150; Referees: Sosa, Lemes (URU)
November 2; 14:00	3× (yellow card) 4× (suspension)	Report	1× (yellow card) 6× (suspension)	Centro de Entrenamiento Olímpico, Santiago; Attendance: 150; Referees: Sosa, Lemes (URU)

November 2; 18:00	Club Atlético Goes (Uruguay)	27–19	(Chile) Ovalle Balonmano	Centro de Entrenamiento Olímpico, Santiago; Attendance: 280; Referees: Burgos, Delgado (ARG)
November 2; 18:00	three players 4	(10–8)	Zavala 8	Centro de Entrenamiento Olímpico, Santiago; Attendance: 280; Referees: Burgos, Delgado (ARG)
November 2; 18:00	3× (yellow card) 5× (suspension)	Report	3× (yellow card) 2× (suspension) 1× (red card)	Centro de Entrenamiento Olímpico, Santiago; Attendance: 280; Referees: Burgos, Delgado (ARG)

November 3; 14:00	Club Atlético Goes (Uruguay)	32–17	(Paraguay) Deportivo San José	Centro de Entrenamiento Olímpico, Santiago; Attendance: 200; Referees: Ochatt, Hernalz (ARG)
November 3; 14:00	Bena 6	(22–5)	Prieto 7	Centro de Entrenamiento Olímpico, Santiago; Attendance: 200; Referees: Ochatt, Hernalz (ARG)
November 3; 14:00		Report		Centro de Entrenamiento Olímpico, Santiago; Attendance: 200; Referees: Ochatt, Hernalz (ARG)

November 3; 18:00	Ferro Carril Oeste (Argentina)	34–14	(Chile) Ovalle Balonmano	Centro de Entrenamiento Olímpico, Santiago; Attendance: 350; Referees: Sosa, Lemes (URU)
November 3; 18:00	Carbia 6	(17–8)	Pizarro 8	Centro de Entrenamiento Olímpico, Santiago; Attendance: 350; Referees: Sosa, Lemes (URU)
November 3; 18:00	2× (yellow card) 2× (suspension)	Report	1× (yellow card) 1× (red card)	Centro de Entrenamiento Olímpico, Santiago; Attendance: 350; Referees: Sosa, Lemes (URU)

== Knockout stage ==
=== Bracket ===
Semifinals
4 November
(Brazil) Metodista São Bernardo	23
(Uruguay) Club Atlético Goes	21
4 November
(Argentina) Ferro Carril Oeste	26
(Uruguay) BBC Layva	20

Final
5 November
(Brazil) Metodista São Bernardo	29
(Argentina) Ferro Carril Oeste	15
Third place
5 November
(Uruguay) Club Atlético Goes	24
(Uruguay) BBC Layva	23

5–8th place bracket

5–8th place semifinals
4 November
(Paraguay) Nueva Estrella	17
(Paraguay) Deportivo San José	21
4 November
(Chile) Ovalle Balonmano	28
(Chile) CH Santiago Morning	23

Fifth place
5 November
(Paraguay) Deportivo San José	21
(Chile) Ovalle Balonmano	22
Seventh place
5 November
(Paraguay) Nueva Estrella	38
(Chile) CH Santiago Morning	26

=== 5–8th place semifinals ===
November 4; 14:00	Nueva Estrella (Paraguay)	17–21	(Paraguay) Deportivo San José	Centro de Entrenamiento Olímpico, Santiago; Attendance: 100; Referees: Oliveira, Vilella (BRA)
November 4; 14:00	F. Acuña 6	(8–10)	Gonzalez, Feschenko 5	Centro de Entrenamiento Olímpico, Santiago; Attendance: 100; Referees: Oliveira, Vilella (BRA)
November 4; 14:00	2× (yellow card) 1× (suspension)	Report	3× (yellow card) 3× (suspension)	Centro de Entrenamiento Olímpico, Santiago; Attendance: 100; Referees: Oliveira, Vilella (BRA)

November 4; 16:00	Ovalle Balonmano (Chile)	28–23	(Chile) CH Santiago Morning	Centro de Entrenamiento Olímpico, Santiago; Attendance: 250; Referees: Burgos, Delgado (ARG)
November 4; 16:00	Zavala 8	(12–12)	Letelier 8	Centro de Entrenamiento Olímpico, Santiago; Attendance: 250; Referees: Burgos, Delgado (ARG)
November 4; 16:00	3× (yellow card) 4× (suspension)	Report	2× (yellow card) 2× (suspension)	Centro de Entrenamiento Olímpico, Santiago; Attendance: 250; Referees: Burgos, Delgado (ARG)

=== Semifinals ===
November 4; 18:00	Metodista São Bernardo (Brazil)	23–21	(Uruguay) Club Atlético Goes	Centro de Entrenamiento Olímpico, Santiago; Attendance: 280; Referees: Ochatt, Hernalz (ARG)
November 4; 18:00	Oliveira 9	(12–9)	Barreiro 6	Centro de Entrenamiento Olímpico, Santiago; Attendance: 280; Referees: Ochatt, Hernalz (ARG)
November 4; 18:00	1× (yellow card) 5× (suspension) 1× (red card)	Report	2× (yellow card) 2× (suspension)	Centro de Entrenamiento Olímpico, Santiago; Attendance: 280; Referees: Ochatt, Hernalz (ARG)

November 4; 20:00	Ferro Carril Oeste (Argentina)	26–20	(Uruguay) BBC Layva	Centro de Entrenamiento Olímpico, Santiago; Attendance: 350; Referees: Moraga, Zavalla (CHI)
November 4; 20:00	Salvadó 8	(10–9)	Falco 6	Centro de Entrenamiento Olímpico, Santiago; Attendance: 350; Referees: Moraga, Zavalla (CHI)
November 4; 20:00	2× (yellow card) 2× (suspension)	Report	2× (yellow card) 6× (suspension)	Centro de Entrenamiento Olímpico, Santiago; Attendance: 350; Referees: Moraga, Zavalla (CHI)

=== Seventh place game ===
November 5; 14:00	Nueva Estrella (Paraguay)	38–26	(Chile) CH Santiago Morning	Centro de Entrenamiento Olímpico, Santiago; Attendance: 100; Referees: Ochatt, Hernalz (ARG)
November 5; 14:00	Bordon 11	(20–14)	Maydana 7	Centro de Entrenamiento Olímpico, Santiago; Attendance: 100; Referees: Ochatt, Hernalz (ARG)
November 5; 14:00	1× (yellow card) 6× (suspension)	Report	1× (yellow card) 4× (suspension)	Centro de Entrenamiento Olímpico, Santiago; Attendance: 100; Referees: Ochatt, Hernalz (ARG)

=== Fifth place game ===
November 5; 16:00	Ovalle Balonmano (Chile)	22–21	(Paraguay) Deportivo San José	Centro de Entrenamiento Olímpico, Santiago; Attendance: 200; Referees: Oliveira, Vilella (BRA)
November 5; 16:00	Zavala 5	(13–12)	Gonzalez 6	Centro de Entrenamiento Olímpico, Santiago; Attendance: 200; Referees: Oliveira, Vilella (BRA)
November 5; 16:00	3× (yellow card) 2× (suspension)	Report	3× (yellow card) 3× (suspension)	Centro de Entrenamiento Olímpico, Santiago; Attendance: 200; Referees: Oliveira, Vilella (BRA)

=== Third place game ===
November 5; 18:00	Club Atlético Goes (Uruguay)	24–23	(Uruguay) BBC Layva	Centro de Entrenamiento Olímpico, Santiago; Attendance: 400; Referees: Burgos, Delgado (ARG)
November 5; 18:00	Scarrone 10	(11–12)	Faedo 8	Centro de Entrenamiento Olímpico, Santiago; Attendance: 400; Referees: Burgos, Delgado (ARG)
November 5; 18:00	2× (yellow card) 4× (suspension)	Report	3× (yellow card)	Centro de Entrenamiento Olímpico, Santiago; Attendance: 400; Referees: Burgos, Delgado (ARG)

=== Final ===
November 5; 20:00	Metodista São Bernardo (Brazil)	29–15	(Argentina) Ferro Carril Oeste	Centro de Entrenamiento Olímpico, Santiago; Attendance: 600; Referees: Sosa, Lemes (URU)
November 5; 20:00	Oliveira 6	(16–5)	Salvadó, Leon 3	Centro de Entrenamiento Olímpico, Santiago; Attendance: 600; Referees: Sosa, Lemes (URU)
November 5; 20:00	2× (yellow card) 5× (suspension)	Report	1× (yellow card) 2× (suspension)	Centro de Entrenamiento Olímpico, Santiago; Attendance: 600; Referees: Sosa, Lemes (URU)

== Final standing ==
Rank	Team
Gold medal	(Brazil) Metodista São Bernardo
Silver medal	(Argentina) Ferro Carril Oeste
Bronze medal	(Uruguay) Club Atlético Goes
4	(Uruguay) BBC Layva
5	(Chile) Ovalle Balonmano
6	(Paraguay) Deportivo San José
7	(Paraguay) Nueva Estrella
8	(Chile) CH Santiago Morning

== Awards ==
All-star team

- Goalkeeper: (Brazil) Ariadne Moreira
- Right Wing: (Brazil) Célia Coppi
- Right Back: (Uruguay) Camila Barreiro
- Playmaker: (Argentina) Victoria Crivelli
- Left Back: (Brazil) Mariane Fernándes
- Left Wing: (Brazil) Dayane Pires da Rocha
- Pivot: (Argentina) Rocio Campigli
