= Mahala (disambiguation) =

Mahala is a word used in many languages and countries meaning neighborhood or location.

Mahala may also refer to:

== Places ==
=== Bosnia and Herzegovina ===
- Mahala (Rogatica), a village in Rogatica Municipality, Republika Srpska
- Mahala (Osmaci), a village in Osmaci Municipality, Republika Srpska
- Mahala (Breza), a village in Breza Municipality, Federation of Bosnia and Herzegovina
- Donja Mahala, a village in Orašje Municipality, Federation of Bosnia and Herzegovina

=== Ukraine ===
- Mahala Lagoon, a lagoon in the Tuzly Lagoons group
- Mahala, Chernivtsi Oblast, a commune (selsoviet) in Chernivtsi Oblast

=== Elsewhere ===
- Mahala, Moldova, a village near Corjova, Dubăsari
- Mahala, Podgorica, a village in Golubovci City Municipality, Podgorica Capital City, Montenegro

== People ==
- Mahala Andrews (1939–1997), British vertebrae palaeontologist
- Mahala Ashley Dickerson (1912–2007), American lawyer and civil rights advocate for women and minorities
- Mahala Wynns (born 1948), Deputy Governor of the Turks and Caicos Islands
- Genny Mahala (born 1992), Cameroonian handball player

== Other ==
- Mahala Rai Banda, Romanian band
