= AWU =

AWU may refer to:

== Trade unions ==
- Alphabet Workers Union, an American union of workers at Alphabet, the parent company of Google
- Amalgamated Workers Union, a trade union in Trinidad and Tobago
- Antigua Workers' Union
- Arbeit Workers Union, South Korea
- Australian Workers' Union

== Other ==
- Abeokuta Women's Union
- American World University
- Ankole Western University
- Annual work unit
- Arab Women's Union
- Arab Writers Union
- Assam Women's University
- Azerbaijan Writers Union
- Sylt Air

== See also ==
- Awu (disambiguation)
