= Célia Coppi =

Brazilian handball player (born 1980)

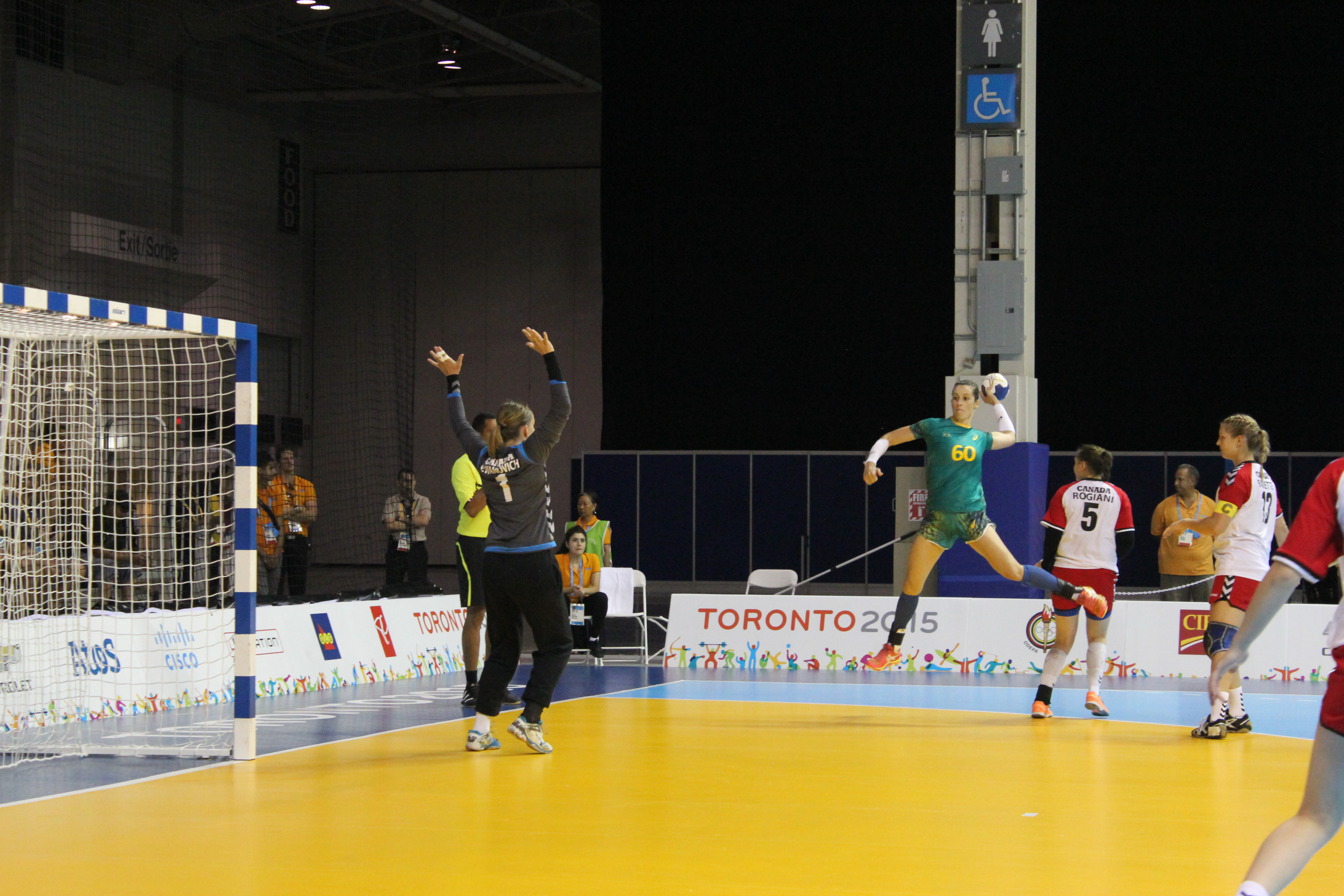

Personal information
- Nationality: Brazilian
- Born: 17 April 1980 (age 46)
- Height: 1.76 m (5 ft 9 in)

Sport
- Sport: Handball
- Position: Right wing
- Current club: Metodista/São Bernardo
National team
Years	Team	Apps	(Gls)
–	Brazil	84	(261)
Medal record
Pan American Games
Gold medal – first place	2003 Santo Domingo	Team
Gold medal – first place	2015 Toronto	Team
Pan American Championship
Gold medal – first place	2015 Cuba

Célia Janete da Costa Coppi (born 17 April 1980) is a Brazilian handball player who plays for the club Metodista/São Bernardo. She is also member of the Brazilian national team. She competed at the 2015 World Women's Handball Championship in Denmark.

== Titles ==
- Pan American Women's Club Handball Championship:
  - 2016

== Individual awards and achievements ==
=== Best right wing ===
- 2016 Pan American Women's Club Handball Championship

=== Best player ===
- Liga Nacional Feminina de Handebol 2016

=== Top scorer ===
- Liga Nacional Feminina de Handebol 2016
