= Makina (disambiguation) =

Mákina is an electronic music genre which originated in Spain.

Makina may also refer to:

- Dar al-Makina, often referred to as the Makina, a Moroccan 19th-century arms factory
- Plaubel Makina, a series of medium format press cameras
- El Makina, a 2012 album by Jordanian rock band JadaL
- La Makina, a Honduran merengue band

== People with the name ==
- Makina Kameya (died 1988), Zimbabwean sculptor
- Anastasiia Makina (born 1997), Russian handballer
- Precious Makina (born 1985), Zambian boxer
