= Danielle Joia =

Brazilian handball player (born 1990)

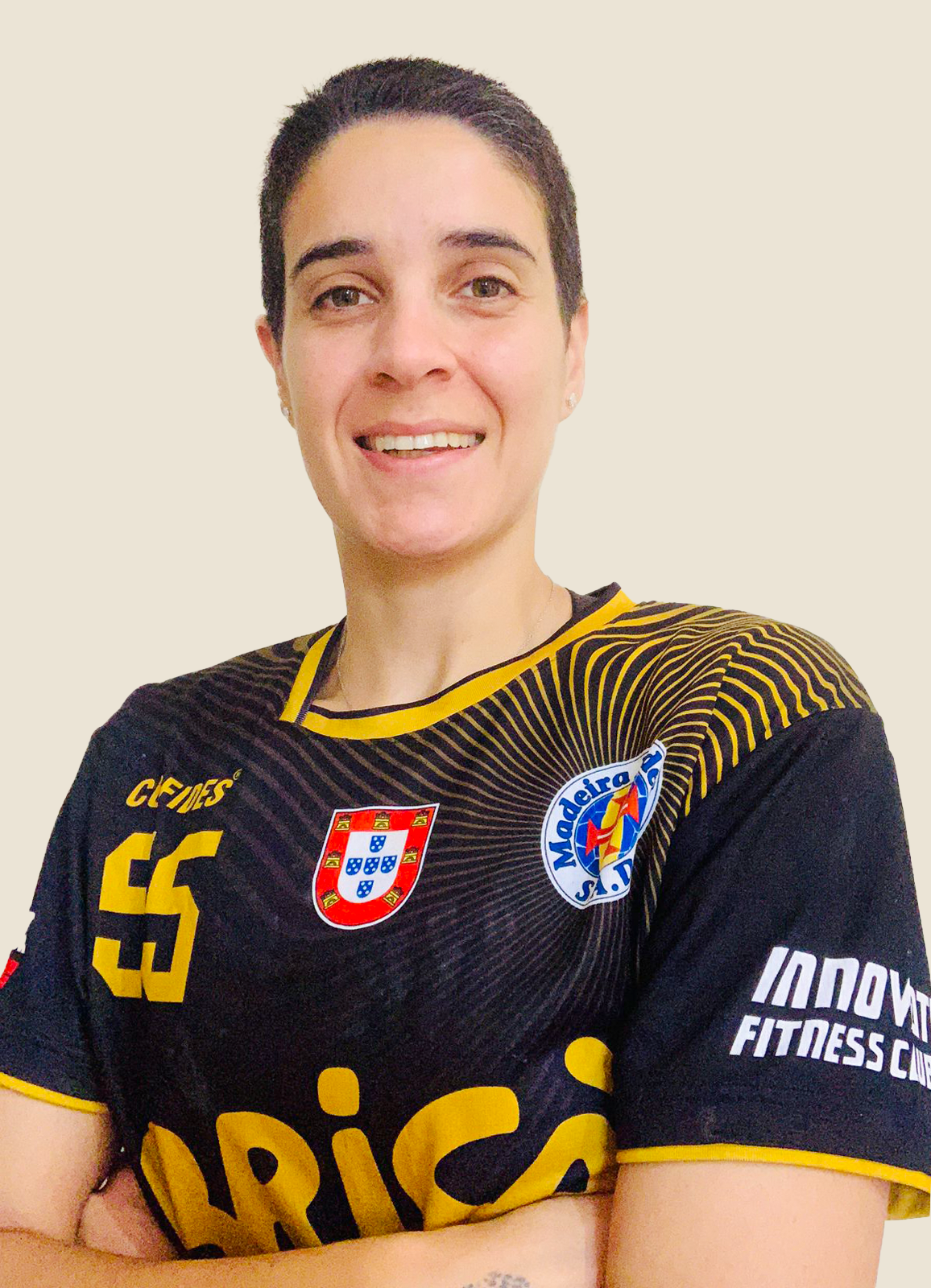

Personal information
- Nationality: Brazilian
- Born: 22 May 1990 (age 36)
- Height: 1.80 m (5 ft 11 in)

Sport
- Sport: Handball
- Position: Defensive Specialist - Centre back
- Current club: Madeira andebol SAD (handball)
- Number: 5

Senior clubs
- Years: Team
- –2019: Esporte Clube Pinheiros
- 2018–2019: BM La Calzada
- 2019–2020: Piotrcovia Piotrków Trybunalski
- 2021–2022: Madeira Andebol SAD
National team
Years	Team	Apps	(Gls)
–	Brazil	15	(30)
Medal record
Pan American Championship
Gold medal – first place	2017 Argentina
South American Games
Gold medal – first place	2018 Cochabamba	Team

Danielle Cristina Joia (born 22 May 1990) is a Brazilian handballer for Madeira Andebol SAD and the Brazilian national team.

== Achievements ==
=== National team ===
Pan American Women's Club Handball Championship: 2017 World Women's Handball Championship:

- 18th: 2017

South American Games :

- Winner: 2018

=== Domestic competitions ===
1ª Divisão de Andebol Feminino:

- 2nd Place: 2021/2022

Polish Superleague:

- 5th Place: 2019/2020

División de Honor Femenina de Balonmano:

- 4th Place: 2018/2019

Paulista Handball Championship:

- Winner: 2018
- 2nd Place: 2017
- Pan American Women's Club Handball Championship:
- Winner: 2017

Brazil National League:

- Winner: 2016
- 3rd Place: 2017

== Individual awards ==
- Best Young Athlete 2018
- Best Centre of the Brfazilian Championship 2018
