= Tamires Anselmo =

Brazilian handballer (born 1990)

Personal information
- Full name: Tamires Anselmo Costa
- Nationality: Brazilian
- Born: 2 May 1990 (age 36)
- Height: 1.70 m (5 ft 7 in)

Sport
- Sport: Handball
- Position: Pivot
- Current club: EC Pinheiros
National team
Years	Team	Apps	(Gls)
–	Brazil	15	(27)
Medal record
Pan American Championship
Gold medal – first place	2017 Argentina
South American Games
Gold medal – first place	2018 Cochabamba	Team

Tamires Anselmo Costa (born 2 May 1990) is a Brazilian handballer for Balonmano Salud Tenerife and the Brazilian national team.

== Achievements ==
- Pan American Women's Club Handball Championship: 2017
