= Awu =

Awu may refer to:

- Awu (county), China
- Awu language, an unclassified Loloish language of Yunnan, China
- Linda Awu (born 1989), a Cameroonian handball player
- Mount Awu, a volcano in Indonesia

== See also ==
- AWU (disambiguation)
