= Monika Michałów =

Polish handball player (born 1988)

Personal information
- Nationality: Polish
- Born: 22 December 1988 (age 37) Łomża, Poland
- Height: 1.90 m (6 ft 3 in)

Sport
- Sport: Handball
- Position: Left back
- Current club: AZS Koszalin
- Number: 5

Youth career
- Years: Team
- –: Dwójka Łomża

Senior clubs
- Years: Team
- 2004–2007: SMS Gliwice
- 2007–2010: Vistal Łączpol Gdynia
- 2010–2015: Start Elbląg
- 2015–: AZS Koszalin
National team
Years	Team	Apps	(Gls)
2009–	Poland	24	(41)

Monika Michałów (born 22 December 1988) is a Polish handballer for AZS Koszalin and the Polish national team.

== International honours ==
- Carpathian Trophy:
  - Winner: 2017
