= Mariane Fernándes =

Brazilian handball player (born 1996)

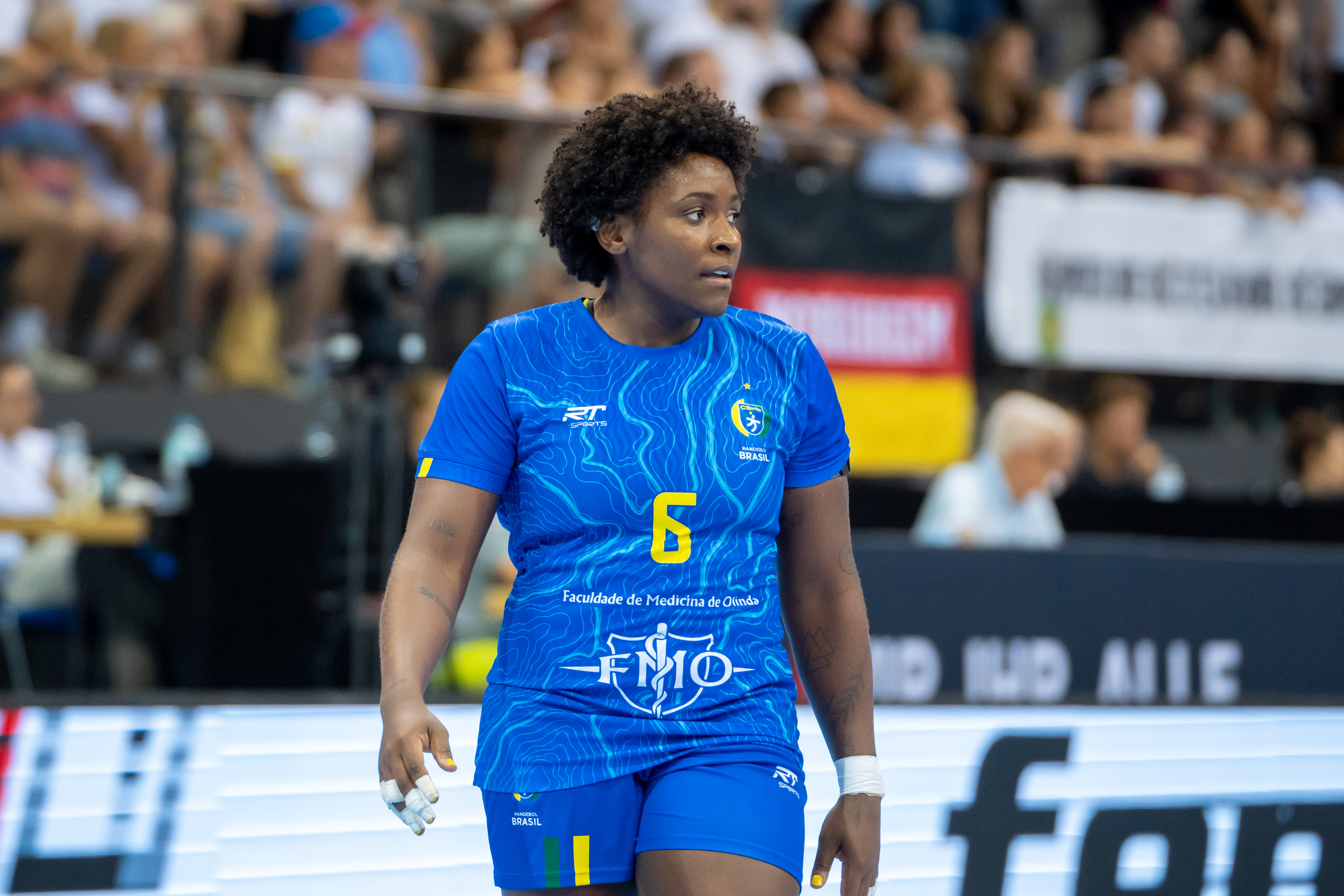
- Fernándes in 2024

Personal information
- Full name: Mariane Cristina Oliveira Fernándes
- Born: 4 January 1996 (age 30) Niterói, Brazil
- Height: 1.65 m (5 ft 5 in)

Sport
- Sport: Handball
- Position: Left back
- Current club: MKS Zaglebie Lubin
- Number: 8

Senior clubs
- Years: Team
- –2017: Metodista
- 2017–2019: Molde HK
- 2019–2024: BM Bera Bera
- 2024–: MKS Zaglebie Lubin
National team
Years	Team	Apps	(Gls)
2018–	Brazil	49	(113)
Medal record
Pan American Games
Gold medal – first place	2023 Santiago	Team
South and Central American Championship
Gold medal – first place	2022 Argentina
Gold medal – first place	2024 Brazil
- Updated on 29 August 2025

Mariane Cristina Oliveira Fernándes (born 4 January 1996) is a Brazilian handball player for Polish team MKS Zaglebie Lubin and the Brazilian national team.

Fernándes represented Brazil at the 2021 World Women's Handball Championship in Spain.

She competed at the 2023 Pan American Games and the 2024 Summer Olympics.

== Individual awards and achievements ==
- 2016 Pan American Women's Club Handball Championship: Best right wing
