= Joanna Andruszak =

Polish handball player (born 1994)

Personal information
- Full name: Joanna Szarawaga
- Nationality: Polish
- Born: 2 April 1994 (age 32) Dębno, Poland
- Height: 1.85 m (6 ft 1 in)

Sport
- Sport: Handball
- Position: Pivot
- Current club: MKS Lublin
- Number: 6

Senior clubs
- Years: Team
- 2010–2011: AZS Politechnika Koszalin
- 2011–2013: SMS Gliwice
- 2013–2016: MKS Lublin
- 2016–2018: GTPR Gdynia
- 2018–: MKS Lublin
National team
Years	Team	Apps	(Gls)
2016–	Poland	15	(21)

Joanna Andruszak (born Joanna Szarawaga, 2 April 1994) is a Polish handballer for MKS Lublin and the Polish national team.

== Achievements ==
- Mistrzostwa Polski:
  - Winner: 2014, 2015, 2016, 2017
- Carpathian Trophy:
  - Winner: 2017
