= Dayane Rocha =

Brazilian handball player (born 1991)

Personal information
- Full name: Dayane Pires da Rocha
- Nationality: Brazilian
- Born: 24 March 1991 (age 35)
- Height: 1.69 m (5 ft 7 in)

Sport
- Sport: Handball
- Position: Left wing
- Current club: Molde Elite
- Number: 23

Senior clubs
- Years: Team
- 2012–2013: Metodista/São Bernardo
- 2013–2017: HC Vardar
- 2017–2019: Molde Elite
- 2020-: CB Salud
National team
Years	Team	Apps	(Gls)
–	Brazil	42	(49)
Medal record
Pan American Championship
Gold medal – first place	2017 Argentina
South and Central American Championship
Gold medal – first place	2018 Brazil
South American Games
Gold medal – first place	2018 Cochabamba	Team

Dayane Pires da Rocha (born 24 March 1991) is a Brazilian handball player for Molde Elite and the Brazilian national team.

She has played in the 2010 Women's Junior World Handball Championship, and in the 2012 Summer Olympics.

== Titles ==
- Pan American Women's Club Handball Championship:
  - 2016

== Individual awards and achievements ==
=== Best left wing ===
- 2016 Pan American Women's Club Handball Championship
