= Yvette Yuoh =

Cameroonian handball player

Personal information
- Nationality: Cameroonian
- Born: 7 July 1989 (age 37)
- Height: 1.88 m (6 ft 2 in)

Sport
- Sport: Handball
- Position: Pivot
- Current club: Tonnerre Yaoundé
National team
Years	Team	Apps
–	Cameroon	6
Medal record
African Championship
Silver medal – second place	2021 Yaoundé

Yvette Yuoh (born 7 July 1989) is a Cameroonian handball player for Tonnerre Yaoundé and the Cameroonian national team.

She participated at the 2017 World Women's Handball Championship. At the 2021 African Championship she won silver medals, losing to Angola in the final.
