= Mo Mengmeng =

Chinese handball player (born 1995)

Personal information
- Nationality: Chinese
- Born: 6 January 1995 (age 31)
- Height: 1.80 m (5 ft 11 in)

Sport
- Sport: Handball
- Position: Pivot
- Current club: Jiangsu
National team
Years	Team	Apps	(Gls)
–	China	42	(19)
Medal record
Asian Championship
Bronze medal – third place	2018 Japan

Mo Mengmeng (born 6 January 1995) is a Chinese handball player for Jiangsu and the Chinese national team.

She participated at the 2017 World Women's Handball Championship.
