= Jean Zambo =

Cameroonian handball coach

Jean Marie Zambo (born January 23, 1959) is a Cameroonian handball coach. He coaches the Cameroonian national team and participated at the 2017 World Women's Handball Championship in Germany.
