= Alja Vrček =

Slovenian handball player

Personal information
- Nationality: Slovenian
- Born: 10 August 1993 (age 33)
- Height: 1.68 m (5 ft 6 in)

Sport
- Sport: Handball
- Position: Pivot
- Current club: MRK Krka
National team
Years	Team	Apps	(Gls)
–	Slovenia	7	(10)
Medal record
Mediterranean Games
Bronze medal – third place	2018 Tarragona	Team

Alja Vrček (born 10 August 1993) is a Slovenian handball player for MRK Krka and the Slovenian national team.

She was selected to represent Slovenia at the 2017 World Women's Handball Championship.
