= Anne Ngo =

Cameroonian handball player

Personal information
- Full name: Anne Ngo Nleng Kaldjob
- Nationality: Cameroonian
- Born: 1 April 1984 (age 42)
- Height: 1.69 m (5 ft 7 in)

Sport
- Sport: Handball
- Position: Left wing
- Current club: FAP Yaoundé
National team
Years	Team	Apps
–	Cameroon	26

Anne Ngo Nleng Kaldjob (born 1 April 1984) is a Cameroonian handball player for FAP Yaoundé and the Cameroonian national team.

She participated at the 2017 World Women's Handball Championship.
