= Senda Chekir =

Tunisian handball player

Personal information
- Full name: Senda Farah Chekir
- Nationality: Tunisian
- Born: 19 July 1992 (age 34)
- Height: 1.78 m (5 ft 10 in)

Sport
- Sport: Handball
- Position: Centre back
- Current club: Megrine Sport HBF
National team
Years	Team	Apps	(Gls)
–	Tunisia	11	(15)

Senda Farah Chekir (born 19 July 1992) is a Tunisian handball player for Megrine Sport HBF and the Tunisian national team.

She participated at the 2017 World Women's Handball Championship.
