= Giuliana Gavilan =

Argentine handball player

Giuliana Gavilán
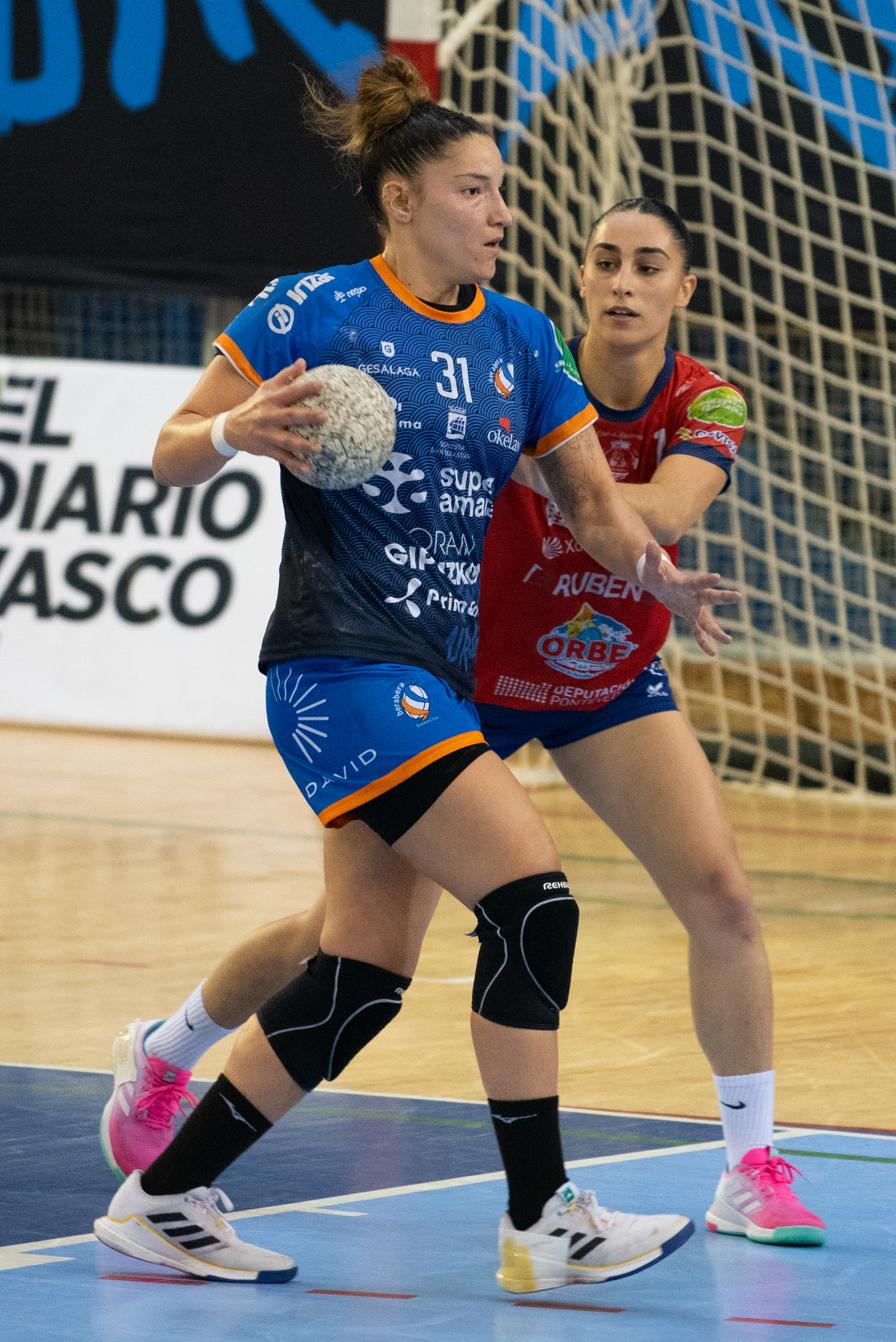

Personal information
- Born: 7 March 1996 (age 30) Villa María, Argentina
- Height: 1.76 m (5 ft 9 in)

Sport
- Sport: Handball
- Position: Pivot
- Current club: Liberbank Gijón
- Number: 23

Senior clubs
- Years: Team
- 2014–2018: Jockey Club Córdoba
- 2018–: Liberbank Gijón
National team
Years	Team	Apps	(Gls)
–	Argentina	83	(113)
Medal record
Pan American Games
Silver medal – second place	2023 Santiago	Team
Pan American Championship
Silver medal – second place	2017 Argentina
South and Central American Championship
Silver medal – second place	2018 Brazil
Silver medal – second place	2021 Paraguay
Silver medal – second place	2022 Argentina
Silver medal – second place	2024 Brazil
South American Games
Silver medal – second place	2018 Cochabamba	Team
Pan American Junior Championship
Silver medal – second place	2016 Brazil
- Updated on 2 November 2025

Giuliana "Shula" Gavilán (born 7 March 1996) is an Argentine handball player for Liberbank Gijón and the Argentine national team.

She was selected to represent Argentina at the 2017 World Women's Handball Championship.

== Individual awards and achievements ==
- 2017 Pan American Women's Club Handball Championship – Best pivot
- 2017 Pan American Women's Club Handball Championship – MVP
