= Tjaša Rudman =

Slovenian handball player

Personal information
- Nationality: Slovenian
- Born: 16 August 1996 (age 30) Novo Mesto, Slovenia
- Height: 1.67 m (5 ft 6 in)

Sport
- Sport: Handball
- Position: Centre back
- Current club: ŽRK Mlinotest Ajdovščina
- Number: 5
National team
Years	Team	Apps	(Gls)
–	Slovenia	2	(1)

Tjaša Rudman (born 16 August 1996) is a Slovenian handball player for ŽRK Mlinotest Ajdovščina and the Slovenian national team.

She was selected to represent Slovenia at the 2017 World Women's Handball Championship.
