= Cynthia Tomescu =

Romanian handball player (born 1991)

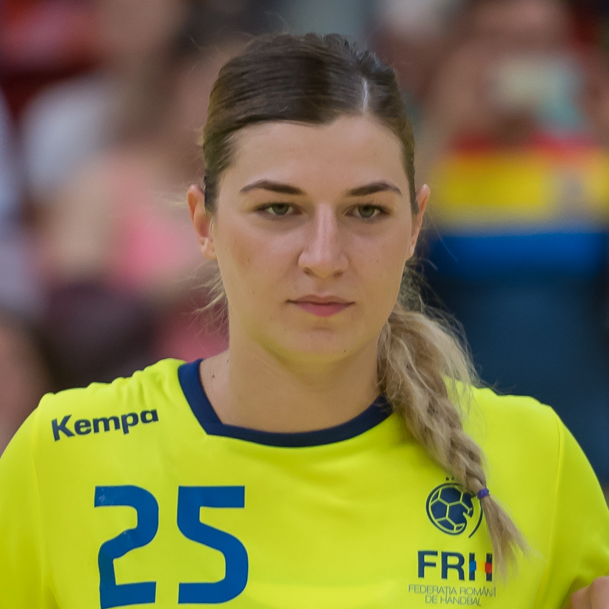

Personal information
- Full name: Andrada Cynthia Tomescu
- Nationality: Romanian
- Born: 30 July 1991 (age 35) Baia Mare, Romania
- Height: 1.80 m (5 ft 11 in)

Sport
- Sport: Handball
- Position: Pivot
- Current club: Dacia Mioveni

Youth career
- Years: Team
- –2010: Extrem Baia Mare

Senior clubs
- Years: Team
- 2010–2016: HCM Baia Mare
- 2014–2015: → SCM Craiova (loan)
- 2015–2016: → HCM Roman (loan)
- 2016–2017: HCM Roman
- 2017–2018: Corona Brașov
- 2018–2020: Măgura Cisnădie
- 2020–: Dacia Mioveni
National team
Years	Team	Apps	(Gls)
2017–	Romania	9	(6)

Andrada Cynthia Tomescu (born 30 July 1991) is a Romanian handballer for Dacia Mioveni.

== Achievements ==
- Liga Naţională:
  - Gold Medalist: 2014
  - Silver Medalist: 2013
  - Bronze Medalist: 2018
- Cupa României:
  - Gold Medalist: 2013, 2014
  - Silver Medalist: 2016
  - Bronze Medalist: 2015
- Supercupa României:
  - Winner: 2013, 2014
