= Ana Maria Berbece =

Romanian handball player (born 1999)

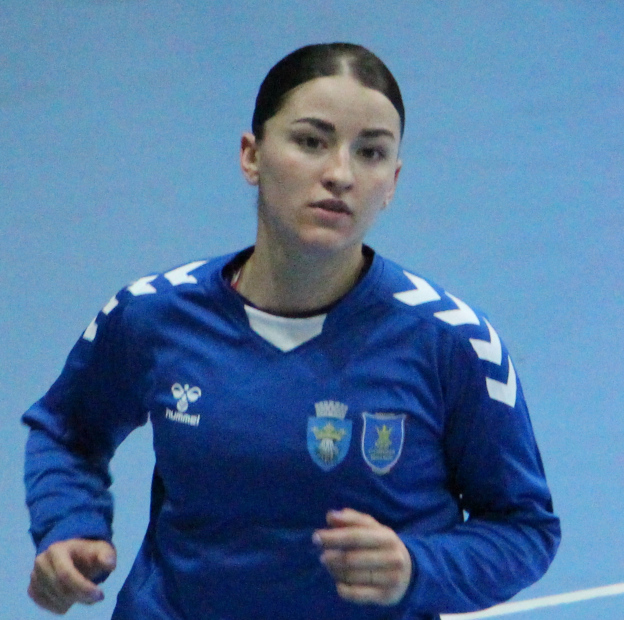

Personal information
- Nationality: Romanian
- Born: 23 July 1999 (age 27) Brașov, Romania
- Height: 1.71 m (5 ft 7 in)

Sport
- Sport: Handball
- Position: Right wing
- Current club: Corona Braşov
- Number: 23

Youth career
- Years: Team
- –: Corona Brașov

Senior clubs
- Years: Team
- 2015–2017: Corona Brașov
- 2017–2019: Universitatea Cluj-Napoca
- 2019–: Corona Brașov
National team
| Years | Team | Apps | (Gls) |
| 2017– | Romania | 6 | (2) |

Ana Maria Berbece (born 23 July 1999) is a Romanian handballer for Corona Brașov.

== International honours ==
- EHF Cup:
  - Semifinalist: 2016

== Personal life ==
She is the daughter of Dumitru Berbece.
