= Ban Chenchen =

Chinese handball player (born 1991)

Personal information
- Nationality: Chinese
- Born: 6 June 1991 (age 35)
- Height: 1.85 m (6 ft 1 in)

Sport
- Sport: Handball
- Position: Left back
- Current club: Anhui
National team
Years	Team	Apps	(Gls)
–	China	20	(5)

Ban Chenchen (born 6 June 1991) is a Chinese handball player for Anhui and the Chinese national team.

She participated at the 2017 World Women's Handball Championship.
