= María de Uriarte =

Argentine handball player (born 1992)

Personal information
- Full name: Maríangeles de Uriarte
- Nationality: Argentine
- Born: 7 June 1992 (age 34)
- Height: 1.70 m (5 ft 7 in)

Sport
- Sport: Handball
- Position: Pivot
- Current club: Argentinos Juniors
National team
| Years | Team | Apps | (Gls) |
| – | Argentina | 18 | (35) |

Maríangeles de Uriarte (born 7 June 1992) is an Argentine handball player for Argentinos Juniors and the Argentine national team.

She was selected to represent Argentina at the 2017 World Women's Handball Championship.
