= Hanna Rycharska =

Polish handball player (born 1988)

Personal information
- Nationality: Polish
- Born: 1 July 1988 (age 38)
- Height: 1.85 m (6 ft 1 in)

Sport
- Sport: Handball
- Position: Left back
- Current club: AZS Politechnika Koszalin
- Number: 27
National team
Years	Team	Apps	(Gls)
–	Poland	17	(13)

Hanna Rycharska (born 1 July 1988), née Sądej, is a Polish handball player for AZS Politechnika Koszalin and the Polish national team.

She competed at the 2015 World Women's Handball Championship in Denmark. and the 2017 championship.
