= Aubiege Njampou =

Cameroonian handball player

Personal information
- Full name: Aubiege Njampou Nono
- Nationality: Cameroonian
- Born: 8 May 1982 (age 44)
- Height: 1.74 m (5 ft 9 in)

Sport
- Sport: Handball
- Position: Left back
- Current club: FAP Yaoundé
National team
Years	Team	Apps
–	Cameroon	60

Aubiege Njampou Nono (born 8 May 1982) is a Cameroonian handball player for FAP Yaoundé and the Cameroonian national team.

She participated at the 2017 World Women's Handball Championship.
