= Issam Lahyani =

Tunisian handball coach

Personal information
- Nationality: Tunisian
- Born: October 7, 1972 (age 54)

Sport
- Sport: Handball

Teams managed
- Years: Team
- 2013-2015: Tunisia (Assistant)
- 2017-?: Tunisia (Manager)

Issam Lahyani (born 7 October 1972) is a Tunisian handball coach.

He became the coach the Tunisian national team in June 2017, and just 6 months later he coached them at the 2017 World Women's Handball Championship. He also led the team at the 2018 African Women's Handball Championship, where the team was eliminated in the quarterfinals, their worst result in 10 years.

Before becoming the head coach, he had been part of the technical staff, and been the assistant coach on the team under Paulo Pereira from 2013 to 2015.
