= Mahala (Rogatica) =

Coordinates: 43°47′38″N 18°50′49″E

Mahala Махала
- Village
- Interactive map of Mahala
- Country: Bosnia and Herzegovina
- Entity: Republika Srpska
- Municipality: Rogatica
- Time zone: UTC+1 (CET)
  - Summer (DST): UTC+2 (CEST)

Mahala (Serbian Cyrillic: Махала) is a village in the Republika Srpska, Bosnia and Herzegovina. According to the 1991 census, the village is located in the municipality of Rogatica.
