= Macarena Sans =

Argentine handball player

Personal information
- Born: 20 November 1996 (age 29) Mendoza, Argentina
- Height: 1.65 m (5 ft 5 in)

Sport
- Sport: Handball
- Position: Centre back
- Current club: CD Beti Onak

Senior clubs
- Years: Team
- –: Mendoza de Regatas
- –: CD Beti Onak
National team
Years	Team	Apps	(Gls)
–	Argentina	109	(302)
Medal record
Pan American Games
Silver medal – second place	2015 Toronto	Team
Silver medal – second place	2019 Lima	Team
Pan American Championship
Silver medal – second place	2017 Argentina
South and Central American Championship
Silver medal – second place	2018 Brazil
Silver medal – second place	2021 Paraguay
Silver medal – second place	2022 Argentina
Silver medal – second place	2024 Brazil
South American Games
Silver medal – second place	2018 Cochabamba	Team
Pan American Junior Championship
Silver medal – second place	2016 Brazil
- Updated on 2 November 2025

Macarena Sans (born 20 November 1996) is an Argentine handball player for CD Beti Onak and the Argentina women's national handball team.

She defended Argentina at the 2015 World Women's Handball Championship in Denmark, and at the 2012 London Summer Olympics.

== Individual awards and achievements ==
- 2017 Pan American Women's Club Handball Championship – Best right back
