= Sylt Air =

German regional airline

IATA	ICAO	Call sign
7E	AWU	SYLT-AIR
- Founded: 1963; 63 years ago
- Operating bases: Sylt Airport
- Fleet size: 10
- Destinations: 2
- Parent company: Sylt-Air GmbH
- Headquarters: Tinnum, Germany
- Website: syltair.de

Sylt Air GmbH is an airline based at Sylt-Ost, Germany, operating chartered and scheduled flights from Sylt Airport.

== History ==
The company was founded in 1963 by Ulrich Schreiber as Friesenflug. From 1978 until 1998 the Polish pilot Kasimir Samp and his wife Ursula owned the company. In 1998, it was sold to Aeroline(since 2001 Sylt Air). Celebrities like playboy Günter Sachs, actor Charles Brauer, comedian Karl Dall, box-champion Dariusz Michalczewski or designer Brigitte Stohlmann frequently were on board on the scheduled flights from Hamburg. Since January 2025 Peter Siemiatkowski sold Sylt Air to PAD Aviation from Padeborn.

== Destinations ==
Sylt Air operates summer seasonal scheduled flights between Sylt Airport and Hamburg Airport. It also offers scenic flights around Sylt and the Frisian Islands as well as other charter operations. During the summer time 2023 a connection to Dortmund is going to be established by a new Cessna Caravan turboprop plane.

== Fleet ==
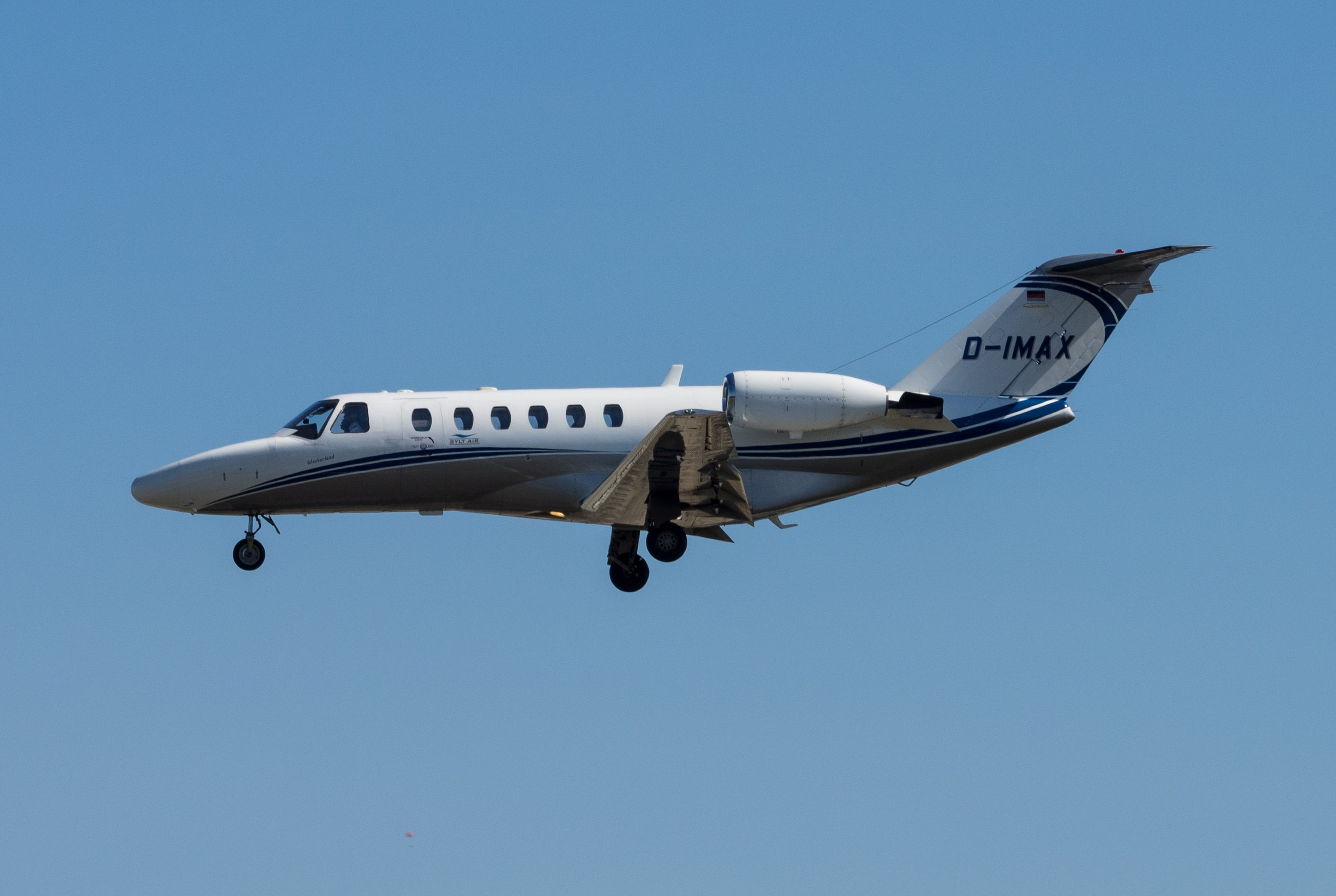
Sylt Air Cessna CitationJet 525

As of April 2023, the Sylt Air fleet includes the following aircraft:

Sylt Air fleet
Aircraft	Total	Notes
Cessna 150	1	
Cessna 182	1	
Cessna 404	1	
Cessna 525A CitationJet CJ2+	2	
Partenavia P68B	2	
Total	7	
