= Ekaterina Matlashova =

Russian handball player (born 1994)

Personal information
- Nationality: Russian
- Born: 25 September 1994 (age 32) Astrakhan, Russia
- Height: 1.85 m (6 ft 1 in)

Sport
- Sport: Handball
- Position: Pivot
- Current club: SCM Craiova
- Number: 19
National team
Years	Team	Apps	(Gls)
–	Russia	8	(4)

Ekaterina Matlashova (born 25 September 1994) is a Russian handball player for SCM Craiova and the Russian national team.

She was selected to represent Russia at the 2017 World Women's Handball Championship.
