= Linda Awu =

Cameroonian handball player

Personal information
- Full name: Linda Awu Bessong Epah
- Nationality: Cameroonian
- Born: 18 July 1989 (age 37)
- Height: 1.72 m (5 ft 8 in)

Sport
- Sport: Handball
- Position: Goalkeeper
- Current club: FAP Yaoundé
National team
Years	Team	Apps
–	Cameroon	16
Medal record
African Championship
Silver medal – second place	2022 Dakar

Linda Awu Bessong Epah (born 18 July 1989) is a Cameroonian handball player for FAP Yaoundé and the Cameroonian national team.

She participated at the 2017 World Women's Handball Championship. At the 2022 African Championship she won silver medals, losing to Angola in the final.
