= Florencia Ponce de León =

Argentine handball player

Florencia Ponce de Leon
Personal information
- Born: 26 February 1992 (age 34) Buenos Aires, Argentina
- Height: 1.79 m (5 ft 10 in)

Sport
- Sport: Handball
- Position: Left back
- Current club: Liberbank Gijón
- Number: 15

Senior clubs
- Years: Team
- 2013–2018: Club Oeste
- 2018–: Liberbank Gijón
National team
Years	Team	Apps	(Gls)
–	Argentina	41	(75)
Medal record
Pan American Championship
Silver medal – second place	2017 Argentina
South American Games
Silver medal – second place	2018 Cochabamba	Team
Bronze medal – third place	2022 Asunción	Team

Florencia Ponce de Leon (born 26 February 1992) is an Argentine handball player for the Liberbank Gijón and the Argentine national team.

She competed at the 2015 World Women's Handball Championship in Denmark.

== Achievements ==
- Argentine Clubs Championship: 2015

== Individual awards and achievements ==
=== Best left back ===
- 2017 Pan American Women's Club Handball Championship

=== Top Scorer ===
- 2017 Pan American Women's Club Handball Championship
