= Anastasiia Makina =

Russian handball player

Personal information
- Nationality: Russian
- Born: 10 December 1997 (age 28) Volgograd, Russia
- Height: 1.67 m (5 ft 6 in)

Sport
- Sport: Handball
- Position: Right wing
- Current club: Dinamo Volgograd
- Number: 97

Senior clubs
- Years: Team
- 2015–: Dinamo Volgograd
National team
Years	Team	Apps	(Gls)
2017–	Russia	7	(5)

Anastasiia Makina (born 10 December 1997) is a Russian handballer for Dinamo Volgograd and the Russia national team.
