= Genny Mahala =

Cameroonian handball player

Personal information
- Full name: Genny Ange Mahala Fonguieng
- Nationality: Cameroonian
- Born: 16 September 1992 (age 34)
- Height: 1.79 m (5 ft 10 in)

Sport
- Sport: Handball
- Position: Centre back
- Current club: FAP Yaoundé
National team
Years	Team	Apps
–	Cameroon	29

Genny Ange Mahala Fonguieng (born 16 September 1992) is a Cameroonian handball player for FAP Yaoundé and the Cameroonian national team.

She participated at the 2017 World Women's Handball Championship.
