= 2017 Pan American Women's Club Handball Championship =

Tournament details
- Host country: Paraguay
- Venue: 1 (in 1 host city)
- Dates: 23–28 October
- Teams: 8 (from 1 confederation)

Final positions
- Champions: (Brazil) EC Pinheiros (1st title)
- Runners-up: (Uruguay) Club Atlético Goes
- Third place: (Argentina) Jockey Club
- Fourth place: (Argentina) Vicente López

Tournament statistics
- Matches played: 20
- Goals scored: 1,092 (54.6 per match)
- Attendance: 4,550 (228 per match)
- Top scorer(s): (Argentina) Florencia Ponce de Leon (52 goals)

Awards
- Best player: (Argentina) Giuliana Gavilán

The 2017 Pan American Women's Club Handball Championship will be the second edition of the tournament organised by the Pan-American Team Handball Federation, and will be held in Asunción, Paraguay 23–28 October.

== Participating teams ==
- (Argentina) Jockey Club
- (Argentina) Vicente López
- (Brazil) EC Pinheiros
- (Chile) Ovalle Balonmano
- (Paraguay) Atlético Triunfo
- (Paraguay) Nueva Estrella
- (Uruguay) BBC Layva
- (Uruguay) Club Atlético Goes

== Preliminary round ==
=== Group A ===
Team	Pld	W	D	L	GF	GA	GD	Pts
(Uruguay) Club Atlético Goes	3	3	0	0	97	68	29	6
(Argentina) Jockey Club	3	2	0	1	84	65	19	4
(Chile) Ovalle Balonmano	3	1	0	2	73	88	–15	2
(Paraguay) Atlético Triunfo	3	0	0	3	59	92	–33	0

Teams qualified to the semi-finals

All times are local (UTC−03:00).

23 October 2017; 14:00	Ovalle Balonmano (Chile)	23–34	(Uruguay) Club Atlético Goes	Parque Olimpico COP, Luque; Attendance: 150; Referees: Galeano, Franco (PAR)
23 October 2017; 14:00	Verdejo 7	(10–18)	Ferrari 10	Parque Olimpico COP, Luque; Attendance: 150; Referees: Galeano, Franco (PAR)
23 October 2017; 14:00	2× (suspension)	Report	3× (yellow card) 4× (suspension)	Parque Olimpico COP, Luque; Attendance: 150; Referees: Galeano, Franco (PAR)

23 October 2017; 18:00	Jockey Club (Argentina)	30–14	(Paraguay) Atlético Triunfo	Parque Olimpico COP, Luque; Attendance: 200; Referees: Araujo, Perdomo (URU)
23 October 2017; 18:00	Denasio, Olmos 5	(17–3)	Ponce de Leon 5	Parque Olimpico COP, Luque; Attendance: 200; Referees: Araujo, Perdomo (URU)
23 October 2017; 18:00	2× (yellow card) 2× (suspension)	Report	2× (yellow card) 4× (suspension)	Parque Olimpico COP, Luque; Attendance: 200; Referees: Araujo, Perdomo (URU)

24 October 2017; 14:00	Club Atlético Goes (Uruguay)	28–22	(Argentina) Jockey Club	Parque Olimpico COP, Luque; Attendance: 150; Referees: Moraga, Zavalla (CHI)
24 October 2017; 14:00	Barreiro 9	(15–12)	Mellano 8	Parque Olimpico COP, Luque; Attendance: 150; Referees: Moraga, Zavalla (CHI)
24 October 2017; 14:00	2× (yellow card) 6× (suspension) 1× (red card)	Report	2× (yellow card) 1× (suspension)	Parque Olimpico COP, Luque; Attendance: 150; Referees: Moraga, Zavalla (CHI)

24 October 2017; 18:00	Atlético Triunfo (Paraguay)	22–27	(Chile) Ovalle Balonmano	Parque Olimpico COP, Luque; Attendance: 300; Referees: Perdomo, Araujo (URU)
24 October 2017; 18:00	Ponce de Leon 9	(8–10)	Canessa 8	Parque Olimpico COP, Luque; Attendance: 300; Referees: Perdomo, Araujo (URU)
24 October 2017; 18:00	1× (yellow card) 6× (suspension)	Report	2× (yellow card)	Parque Olimpico COP, Luque; Attendance: 300; Referees: Perdomo, Araujo (URU)

25 October 2017; 14:00	Ovalle Balonmano (Chile)	23–32	(Argentina) Jockey Club	Parque Olimpico COP, Luque; Attendance: 100; Referees: Perdomo, Araujo (URU)
25 October 2017; 14:00	three players 4	(10–16)	Haro 7	Parque Olimpico COP, Luque; Attendance: 100; Referees: Perdomo, Araujo (URU)
25 October 2017; 14:00	3× (yellow card) 4× (suspension)	Report	3× (yellow card) 5× (suspension)	Parque Olimpico COP, Luque; Attendance: 100; Referees: Perdomo, Araujo (URU)

25 October 2017; 18:00	Atlético Triunfo (Paraguay)	23–35	(Uruguay) Club Atlético Goes	Parque Olimpico COP, Luque; Attendance: 80; Referees: Paolantoni, Zanikian (ARG)
25 October 2017; 18:00	Ponce de Leon 17	(15–13)	Barreiro 11	Parque Olimpico COP, Luque; Attendance: 80; Referees: Paolantoni, Zanikian (ARG)
25 October 2017; 18:00	2× (yellow card) 7× (suspension)	Report	2× (yellow card) 3× (suspension)	Parque Olimpico COP, Luque; Attendance: 80; Referees: Paolantoni, Zanikian (ARG)

=== Group B ===
Team	Pld	W	D	L	GF	GA	GD	Pts
(Brazil) EC Pinheiros	3	3	0	0	100	38	62	6
(Argentina) Vicente López	3	1	1	1	68	71	–3	3
(Uruguay) BBC Layva	3	1	1	1	82	89	–7	3
(Paraguay) Nueva Estrella	3	0	0	3	58	110	–52	0

Teams qualified to the semi-finals

23 October 2017; 16:00	EC Pinheiros (Brazil)	36–17	(Uruguay) BBC Layva	Parque Olimpico COP, Luque; Attendance: 250; Referees: Paolantoni, Zanikian (ARG)
23 October 2017; 16:00	Damasceno 6	(14–8)	Pessina, Eattsman 3	Parque Olimpico COP, Luque; Attendance: 250; Referees: Paolantoni, Zanikian (ARG)
23 October 2017; 16:00	2× (yellow card) 3× (suspension)	Report	2× (yellow card) 4× (suspension)	Parque Olimpico COP, Luque; Attendance: 250; Referees: Paolantoni, Zanikian (ARG)

23 October 2017; 20:00	Vicente López (Argentina)	28–24	(Paraguay) Nueva Estrella	Parque Olimpico COP, Luque; Attendance: 350; Referees: Oliveira, Vilela (BRA)
23 October 2017; 20:00	Moreno, Cordoba 6	(16–12)	Acuña 10	Parque Olimpico COP, Luque; Attendance: 350; Referees: Oliveira, Vilela (BRA)
23 October 2017; 20:00	3× (yellow card) 3× (suspension)	Report	2× (yellow card) 3× (suspension)	Parque Olimpico COP, Luque; Attendance: 350; Referees: Oliveira, Vilela (BRA)

24 October 2017; 16:00	BBC Layva (Uruguay)	27–27	(Argentina) Vicente López	Parque Olimpico COP, Luque; Attendance: 250; Referees: Franco, Galeano (PAR)
24 October 2017; 16:00	Eattsman 7	(13–9)	Moreno 6	Parque Olimpico COP, Luque; Attendance: 250; Referees: Franco, Galeano (PAR)
24 October 2017; 16:00	1× (yellow card) 4× (suspension)	Report	3× (yellow card) 3× (suspension)	Parque Olimpico COP, Luque; Attendance: 250; Referees: Franco, Galeano (PAR)

24 October 2017; 20:00	Nueva Estrella (Paraguay)	8–44	(Brazil) EC Pinheiros	Parque Olimpico COP, Luque; Attendance: 300; Referees: Paolantoni, Zanikian (ARG)
24 October 2017; 20:00	F. Acuña 6	(2–23)	Santos 7	Parque Olimpico COP, Luque; Attendance: 300; Referees: Paolantoni, Zanikian (ARG)
24 October 2017; 20:00	2× (yellow card) 5× (suspension)	Report	2× (yellow card) 6× (suspension)	Parque Olimpico COP, Luque; Attendance: 300; Referees: Paolantoni, Zanikian (ARG)

25 October 2017; 16:00	Vicente López (Argentina)	13–20	(Brazil) EC Pinheiros	Parque Olimpico COP, Luque; Attendance: 250; Referees: Moraga, Zavalla (CHI)
25 October 2017; 16:00	Moreno 6	(7–10)	Oliveira 4	Parque Olimpico COP, Luque; Attendance: 250; Referees: Moraga, Zavalla (CHI)
25 October 2017; 16:00	1× (yellow card) 2× (suspension)	Report	3× (yellow card) 2× (suspension)	Parque Olimpico COP, Luque; Attendance: 250; Referees: Moraga, Zavalla (CHI)

25 October 2017; 20:00	BBC Layva (Uruguay)	38–26	(Paraguay) Nueva Estrella	Parque Olimpico COP, Luque; Attendance: 350; Referees: Vilela, Oliveira (BRA)
25 October 2017; 20:00	Ferrari 9	(19–12)	Acuña 8	Parque Olimpico COP, Luque; Attendance: 350; Referees: Vilela, Oliveira (BRA)
25 October 2017; 20:00	2× (yellow card) 7× (suspension)	Report	4× (yellow card) 5× (suspension)	Parque Olimpico COP, Luque; Attendance: 350; Referees: Vilela, Oliveira (BRA)

== Knockout stage ==
=== Bracket ===
Semifinals
27 October
(Uruguay) Club Atlético Goes	30
(Argentina) Vicente López	28
27 October
(Brazil) EC Pinheiros	31
(Argentina) Jockey Club	19

Final
28 October
(Uruguay) Club Atlético Goes	23
(Brazil) EC Pinheiros	33
Third place
28 October
(Argentina) Vicente López	26
(Argentina) Jockey Club	36

5–8th place bracket

5–8th place semifinals
27 October
(Paraguay) Atlético Triunfo	29
(Uruguay) BBC Layva	33
27 October
(Chile) Ovalle Balonmano	35
(Paraguay) Nueva Estrella	37

Fifth place
28 October
(Uruguay) BBC Layva	31
(Paraguay) Nueva Estrella	30
Seventh place
28 October
(Paraguay) Atlético Triunfo	22
(Chile) Ovalle Balonmano	28

=== 5–8th place semifinals ===
27 October 2017; 14:00	BBC Layva (Uruguay)	33–29	(Paraguay) Atlético Triunfo	Parque Olimpico COP, Luque; Attendance: 150; Referees: Paolantoni, Zanikian (ARG)
27 October 2017; 14:00	Martin 8	(19–17)	Ponce de Leon 12	Parque Olimpico COP, Luque; Attendance: 150; Referees: Paolantoni, Zanikian (ARG)
27 October 2017; 14:00	2× (yellow card)	Report	7× (suspension)	Parque Olimpico COP, Luque; Attendance: 150; Referees: Paolantoni, Zanikian (ARG)

27 October 2017; 16:00	Ovalle Balonmano (Chile)	35–37	(Paraguay) Nueva Estrella	Parque Olimpico COP, Luque; Attendance: 200; Referees: Perdomo, Araujo (PAR)
27 October 2017; 16:00	Verdejo 11	(19–18)	Valenzuela 10	Parque Olimpico COP, Luque; Attendance: 200; Referees: Perdomo, Araujo (PAR)
27 October 2017; 16:00	2× (yellow card) 4× (suspension)	Report	1× (yellow card) 6× (suspension)	Parque Olimpico COP, Luque; Attendance: 200; Referees: Perdomo, Araujo (PAR)

=== Semifinals ===
27 October 2017; 18:00	Club Atlético Goes (Uruguay)	30–28	(Argentina) Vicente López	Parque Olimpico COP, Luque; Attendance: 150; Referees: Vilela, Oliveira (BRA)
27 October 2017; 18:00	Barreiro 8	(14–12)	Sans 9	Parque Olimpico COP, Luque; Attendance: 150; Referees: Vilela, Oliveira (BRA)
27 October 2017; 18:00	1× (yellow card) 5× (suspension)	Report	2× (yellow card) 4× (suspension)	Parque Olimpico COP, Luque; Attendance: 150; Referees: Vilela, Oliveira (BRA)

27 October 2017; 20:00	EC Pinheiros (Brazil)	31–19	(Argentina) Jockey Club	Parque Olimpico COP, Luque; Attendance: 300; Referees: Loraga, Zavalla (CHI)
27 October 2017; 20:00	Four Players 5	(13–9)	Gavilan 7	Parque Olimpico COP, Luque; Attendance: 300; Referees: Loraga, Zavalla (CHI)
27 October 2017; 20:00	2× (yellow card) 3× (suspension)	Report	1× (yellow card) 2× (suspension)	Parque Olimpico COP, Luque; Attendance: 300; Referees: Loraga, Zavalla (CHI)

=== Seventh place game ===
28 October 2017; 14:00	Atlético Triunfo (Paraguay)	22–28	(Chile) Ovalle Balonmano	Parque Olimpico COP, Luque; Attendance: 200; Referees: Perdomo, Araujo (URU)
28 October 2017; 14:00	Ponce de Leon 9	(9–12)	Verdejo 9	Parque Olimpico COP, Luque; Attendance: 200; Referees: Perdomo, Araujo (URU)
28 October 2017; 14:00	2× (yellow card) 4× (suspension) 1× (red card)	Report	1× (yellow card) 1× (suspension)	Parque Olimpico COP, Luque; Attendance: 200; Referees: Perdomo, Araujo (URU)

=== Fifth place game ===
28 October 2017; 16:00	Nueva Estrella (Paraguay)	30–31	(Uruguay) BBC Layva	Parque Olimpico COP, Luque; Attendance: 250; Referees: Moraga, Zavalla (CHI)
28 October 2017; 16:00	F. Acuña, Acuña 9	(13–18)	Eattsman, Martin 5	Parque Olimpico COP, Luque; Attendance: 250; Referees: Moraga, Zavalla (CHI)
28 October 2017; 16:00	2× (yellow card) 4× (suspension)	Report	1× (yellow card) 3× (suspension)	Parque Olimpico COP, Luque; Attendance: 250; Referees: Moraga, Zavalla (CHI)

=== Third place game ===
28 October 2017; 18:00	Vicente López (Argentina)	26–36	(Argentina) Jockey Club	Parque Olimpico COP, Luque; Attendance: 320; Referees: Vilela, Oliveira (BRA)
28 October 2017; 18:00	Moreno, Cordoba 7	(14–17)	Yudica 8	Parque Olimpico COP, Luque; Attendance: 320; Referees: Vilela, Oliveira (BRA)
28 October 2017; 18:00	3× (yellow card) 3× (suspension)	Report	2× (yellow card) 3× (suspension)	Parque Olimpico COP, Luque; Attendance: 320; Referees: Vilela, Oliveira (BRA)

=== Final ===
28 October 2017; 20:00	Club Atlético Goes (Uruguay)	23–33	(Brazil) EC Pinheiros	Parque Olimpico COP, Luque; Attendance: 250; Referees: Paoloantoni, Zanikian (ARG)
28 October 2017; 20:00	Scarrone 9	(11–16)	dos Santos 7	Parque Olimpico COP, Luque; Attendance: 250; Referees: Paoloantoni, Zanikian (ARG)
28 October 2017; 20:00	4× (yellow card) 2× (suspension)	Report	1× (yellow card) 6× (suspension)	Parque Olimpico COP, Luque; Attendance: 250; Referees: Paoloantoni, Zanikian (ARG)

== Final standing ==
Rank	Team
Gold medal	(Brazil) EC Pinheiros
Silver medal	(Uruguay) Club Atlético Goes
Bronze medal	(Argentina) Jockey Club
4	(Argentina) Vicente López
5	(Uruguay) BBC Layva
6	(Paraguay) Nueva Estrella
7	(Chile) Ovalle Balonmano
8	(Paraguay) Atlético Triunfo

== Awards ==
All-star team

- Goalkeeper: (Brazil) Alice Fernandes da Silva
- Right Wing: (Brazil) Isabelle dos Santos
- Right Back: (Argentina) Macarena Sans
- Playmaker: (Uruguay) Alejandra Scarrone
- Left Back: (Argentina) Florencia Ponce de Leon
- Left Wing: (Uruguay) Martina Barreiro
- Pivot: (Argentina) Giuliana Gavilan
