= AZS Politechnika Koszalin =

AZS Energa Koszalin
- Full name: AZS Koszalin
- Founded: 1999
- Arena: Hala Widowiskowo-Sportowa
- Capacity: 2,250
- President: Roman Granosik
- Head coach: Waldemar Szymański
- League: PGNiG Superliga
- 2021-22: 7th
- Club colours
Home	Away

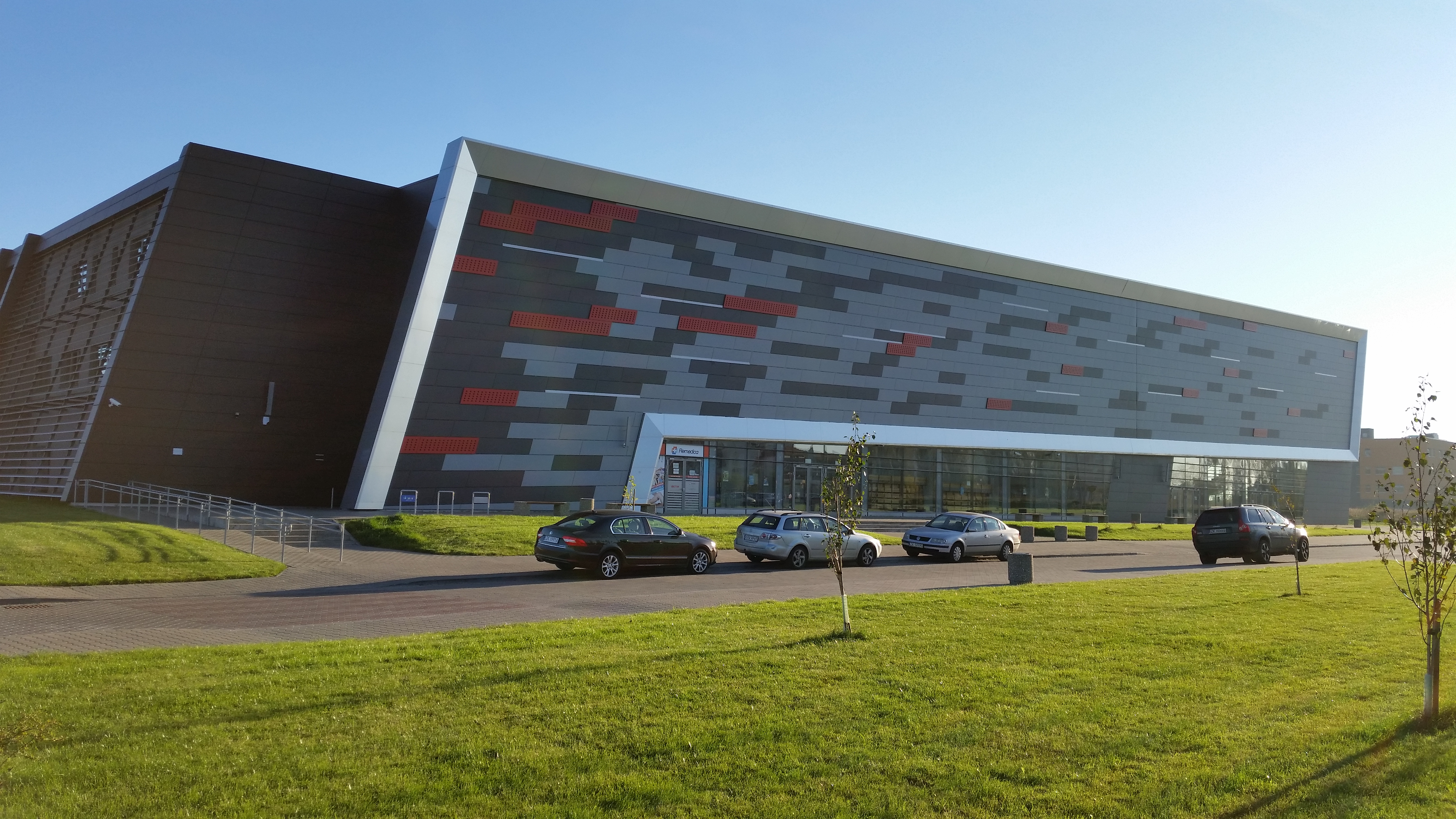
Hala Widowiskowo-Sportowa.

Energa AZS Koszalin (formerly AZS Politechnika Koszalin) is a Polish women's handball team, based in Koszalin. The club was founded in 1999 and debut it first debut in the Polish Ekstraklasa in 2004.

They play their home matches in Hala Widowiskowo-Sportowa, which have capacity for 2,250 spectators. They play mostly in green shirts and black shorts.

== Honours ==
- Polish Superliga:
  - Bronze: 2013, 2018, 2019
- Polish Cup:
  - Winner: 2008
  - Finalist: 2009
- Women's EHF Challenge Cup
  - Quarterfinalist: 2012/13

== Arena ==
- Arena: Hala Widowiskowo-Sportowa
- City: Koszalin
- Capacity: 2,250
- Address: Śniadeckich 4, 75-453 Koszalin

== Team ==
=== Current squad ===
Squad for the 2021–22 season

Goalkeepers

- 1 (Poland) Katarzyna Zimny
- 12 (Poland) Natalia Filończuk
- 88 (Ukraine) Alekxandra Ivanytsia

Left wingers

- 5 (Poland) Gabriela Urbania
- 9 (Poland) Żaneta Lipok

Right wingers

- 10 (Poland) Aleksandra Zalesny
- 24 (Poland) Emilia Kowalik

Line players

- 27 (Poland) Hanna Rycharska
- 91 (Poland) Daria Somionka

Left backs

- 6 (Poland) Paula Mazurek
- 7 (Poland) Anna Mączka
- 55 (Poland) Adrianna Nowicka

Centre backs

- 23 (Poland) Martyna Żukowska
- 71 (Poland) Martyna Borysławska

Right backs

- 11 (Poland) Gabriela Haric
- 31 (Poland) Adrianna Kurdzielewicz

=== Transfers ===
Transfers for the 2022-23 season

Joining

Leaving

== See also ==
- Handball in Poland
- Sports in Poland
