= Pan American Women's Club Handball Championship =

Female handball competition for North and South America

- Founded: 2016
- First season: 2017
- No. of teams: 8
- Country: PATHF American members
- Confederation: PATHF (America)
- Most recent champions: (Brazil) Esporte Clube Pinheiros (1st title)
- Most titles: (Brazil) Esporte Clube Pinheiros (1 titles)
- Level on pyramid: 1
- Website: http://www.panamhandball.org/
- 2018 Pan American Women's Club Handball Championship

The Pan American Women's Club Handball Championship, organized by the Pan-American Team Handball Federation, is the official competition for women's handball clubs in the Americas crowning the Pan American champions.

== Summary ==
Year	Host	Final			Third place match		
Year	Host	Champion	Score	Runner-up	Third place	Score	Fourth place
experimental edition (2016); Details	(Chile); Santiago	(Brazil); Metodista São Bernardo	29 – 15	(Argentina); Ferro Carril Oeste	(Uruguay); Club Atlético Goes	24 – 23	(Uruguay); BBC Layva
I (2017); Details	(Paraguay); Asunción	(Brazil); EC Pinheiros	33 – 23	(Uruguay); Club Atlético Goes	(Argentina); Jockey Club	36 – 26	(Argentina); Vicente López

== Medal table ==
Locations of the Pan American Women's Club Handball Championship winners
All clubs are from São Paulo, Brazil

=== Per Club ===
Rank	Nation	Gold	Silver	Bronze	Total
1	(Brazil) EC Pinheiros	1	0	0	1
1	(Brazil) Metodista São Bernardo	1	0	0	1
3	(Uruguay) Club Atlético Goes	0	1	1	2
4	(Argentina) Ferro Carril Oeste	0	1	0	1
5	(Argentina) Jockey Club	0	0	1	1
Totals (5 entries)		2	2	2	6

=== Per Nation ===
Rank	Nation	Gold	Silver	Bronze	Total
1	Brazil	2	0	0	2
2	Argentina	0	1	1	2
2	Uruguay	0	1	1	2
Totals (3 entries)		2	2	2	6
