= 2017 World Women's Handball Championship – European qualification =

The European qualification for the 2017 World Women's Handball Championship in Germany was played over two rounds. The 2017 hosts Germany and the 2015 Champion Norway qualified automatically for the World Championship.

In the first round of qualification, the 15 teams who did not participate in the 2016 European Championship were split into four groups. The first and second placed teams from Groups 1–3 and the first placed team from Group 4 joined the eleven teams from the European Championship that did not qualify directly in a playoff to determine the nine teams that qualified for the 2017 World Championship.

== Qualification phase 1 ==
=== Seeding ===
The draw was held on 24 June 2016. The first and second placed teams from Group 1–3 and the group winner of Group 4 advanced to the playoff round.

Pot 1	Pot 2	Pot 3
Austria; Belarus; Iceland; Slovakia; Turkey; Ukraine	Italy; Lithuania; Macedonia; Portugal; Switzerland	Faroe Islands; Greece; Israel; Kosovo

All times are local.

=== Group 1 ===
Pos	Team	Pld	W	D	L	GF	GA	GD	Pts	Qualification
1	Ukraine	3	3	0	0	79	50	+29	6	Qualification phase 2
2	Slovakia (H)	3	2	0	1	74	61	+13	4	Qualification phase 2
3	Lithuania	3	1	0	2	63	83	−20	2	
4	Greece	3	0	0	3	63	85	−22	0	

Source: Eurohandball
Rules for classification: 1) points; 2) head-to-head points; 3) head-to-head goal difference; 4) head-to-head number of goals scored; 5) goal difference.
(H) Hosts

25 November 2016; 17:45	Ukraine	21–20	Slovakia	Mestská športová hala, Šaľa; Attendance: 2,000; Referees: Pech, Vagvölgyi (HUN)
25 November 2016; 17:45	Snopova 6	(9–13)	Jakubisová 7	Mestská športová hala, Šaľa; Attendance: 2,000; Referees: Pech, Vagvölgyi (HUN)
25 November 2016; 17:45	3× (yellow card) 3× (suspension)	Report	3× (yellow card) 3× (suspension)	Mestská športová hala, Šaľa; Attendance: 2,000; Referees: Pech, Vagvölgyi (HUN)

25 November 2016; 19:45	Lithuania	31–25	Greece	Mestská športová hala, Šaľa; Attendance: 1,000; Referees: Praštalo, Todorović (BIH)
25 November 2016; 19:45	Šatkauskaitė 9	(18–13)	Vafeiadou 9	Mestská športová hala, Šaľa; Attendance: 1,000; Referees: Praštalo, Todorović (BIH)
25 November 2016; 19:45	3× (yellow card) 3× (suspension)	Report	2× (yellow card) 4× (suspension)	Mestská športová hala, Šaľa; Attendance: 1,000; Referees: Praštalo, Todorović (BIH)

26 November 2016; 17:45	Slovakia	27–24	Greece	Mestská športová hala, Šaľa; Attendance: 2,000; Referees: Pech, Vagvölgyi (HUN)
26 November 2016; 17:45	Rechtorisová 11	(13–10)	Tsakalou 7	Mestská športová hala, Šaľa; Attendance: 2,000; Referees: Pech, Vagvölgyi (HUN)
26 November 2016; 17:45	3× (yellow card) 4× (suspension)	Report	3× (yellow card) 7× (suspension) 1× (red card)	Mestská športová hala, Šaľa; Attendance: 2,000; Referees: Pech, Vagvölgyi (HUN)

26 November 2016; 19:45	Ukraine	31–16	Lithuania	Mestská športová hala, Šaľa; Attendance: 500; Referees: Praštalo, Todorović (BIH)
26 November 2016; 19:45	Redka 6	(16–6)	Šatkauskaitė] 8	Mestská športová hala, Šaľa; Attendance: 500; Referees: Praštalo, Todorović (BIH)
26 November 2016; 19:45	2× (yellow card) 5× (suspension)	Report	3× (yellow card) 4× (suspension)	Mestská športová hala, Šaľa; Attendance: 500; Referees: Praštalo, Todorović (BIH)

27 November 2016; 17:45	Slovakia	27–16	Lithuania	Mestská športová hala, Šaľa; Attendance: 2,000; Referees: Praštalo, Todorović (BIH)
27 November 2016; 17:45	Holešová 8	(13–9)	Šatkauskaitė 6	Mestská športová hala, Šaľa; Attendance: 2,000; Referees: Praštalo, Todorović (BIH)
27 November 2016; 17:45	2× (yellow card) 2× (suspension) 1× (red card)	Report	2× (yellow card) 4× (suspension)	Mestská športová hala, Šaľa; Attendance: 2,000; Referees: Praštalo, Todorović (BIH)

27 November 2016; 19:45	Greece	14–27	Ukraine	Mestská športová hala, Šaľa; Attendance: 500; Referees: Pech, Vagvölgyi (HUN)
27 November 2016; 19:45	Tsaousidou 3	(7–14)	Borshchenko 11	Mestská športová hala, Šaľa; Attendance: 500; Referees: Pech, Vagvölgyi (HUN)
27 November 2016; 19:45	3× (yellow card) 1× (suspension)	Report	3× (yellow card) 3× (suspension)	Mestská športová hala, Šaľa; Attendance: 500; Referees: Pech, Vagvölgyi (HUN)

=== Group 2 ===
Pos	Team	Pld	W	D	L	GF	GA	GD	Pts	Qualification
1	Belarus (H)	3	3	0	0	103	63	+40	6	Qualification phase 2
2	Turkey	3	2	0	1	88	78	+10	4	Qualification phase 2
3	Switzerland	3	1	0	2	87	85	+2	2	
4	Kosovo	3	0	0	3	51	103	−52	0	

Source: Eurohandball
Rules for classification: 1) points; 2) head-to-head points; 3) head-to-head goal difference; 4) head-to-head number of goals scored; 5) goal difference.
(H) Hosts

2 December 2016; 17:00	Belarus	37–23	Turkey	Sport Palace Uruchye, Minsk; Attendance: 1,850; Referees: Năstase, Stancu (ROU)
2 December 2016; 17:00	Vasileuskaya, Yezhkava 5	(17–10)	Özel 5	Sport Palace Uruchye, Minsk; Attendance: 1,850; Referees: Năstase, Stancu (ROU)
2 December 2016; 17:00	3× (yellow card) 3× (suspension)	Report	2× (yellow card) 3× (suspension)	Sport Palace Uruchye, Minsk; Attendance: 1,850; Referees: Năstase, Stancu (ROU)

2 December 2016; 19:00	Switzerland	36–21	Kosovo	Sport Palace Uruchye, Minsk; Attendance: 318; Referees: Rakytina, Tkachuk (UKR)
2 December 2016; 19:00	Scherer 8	(16–10)	Kelmendi 7	Sport Palace Uruchye, Minsk; Attendance: 318; Referees: Rakytina, Tkachuk (UKR)
2 December 2016; 19:00	2× (yellow card) 5× (suspension) 1× (red card)	Report	2× (yellow card) 6× (suspension) 1× (red card)	Sport Palace Uruchye, Minsk; Attendance: 318; Referees: Rakytina, Tkachuk (UKR)

3 December 2016; 13:00	Turkey	36–17	Kosovo	Sport Palace Uruchye, Minsk; Attendance: 205; Referees: Rakytina, Tkachuk (UKR)
3 December 2016; 13:00	Akcanca, Özel 5	(15–10)	Kelmendi, Rama 7	Sport Palace Uruchye, Minsk; Attendance: 205; Referees: Rakytina, Tkachuk (UKR)
3 December 2016; 13:00	1× (yellow card) 1× (suspension)	Report	2× (yellow card) 7× (suspension)	Sport Palace Uruchye, Minsk; Attendance: 205; Referees: Rakytina, Tkachuk (UKR)

3 December 2016; 15:00	Belarus	35–27	Switzerland	Sport Palace Uruchye, Minsk; Attendance: 1,820; Referees: Năstase, Stancu (ROU)
3 December 2016; 15:00	Nestsiaruk 8	(17–15)	Scherer 7	Sport Palace Uruchye, Minsk; Attendance: 1,820; Referees: Năstase, Stancu (ROU)
3 December 2016; 15:00	2× (yellow card) 4× (suspension)	Report	3× (yellow card) 4× (suspension)	Sport Palace Uruchye, Minsk; Attendance: 1,820; Referees: Năstase, Stancu (ROU)

4 December 2016; 12:00	Turkey	29–24	Switzerland	Sport Palace Uruchye, Minsk; Attendance: 425; Referees: Năstase, Stancu (ROU)
4 December 2016; 12:00	İskit 11	(15–13)	Scherer 7	Sport Palace Uruchye, Minsk; Attendance: 425; Referees: Năstase, Stancu (ROU)
4 December 2016; 12:00	2× (yellow card) 1× (suspension)	Report	3× (yellow card) 3× (suspension)	Sport Palace Uruchye, Minsk; Attendance: 425; Referees: Năstase, Stancu (ROU)

4 December 2016; 14:00	Kosovo	13–31	Belarus	Sport Palace Uruchye, Minsk; Attendance: 1,510; Referees: Rakytina, Tkachuk (UKR)
4 December 2016; 14:00	Gjikoka 6	(6–16)	Mazgo 9	Sport Palace Uruchye, Minsk; Attendance: 1,510; Referees: Rakytina, Tkachuk (UKR)
4 December 2016; 14:00	3× (yellow card) 3× (suspension) 1× (red card)	Report	2× (yellow card) 2× (suspension)	Sport Palace Uruchye, Minsk; Attendance: 1,510; Referees: Rakytina, Tkachuk (UKR)

=== Group 3 ===
Pos	Team	Pld	W	D	L	GF	GA	GD	Pts	Qualification
1	Austria	3	2	0	1	81	67	+14	4 (Note: Austria, 2 Pts, +5 GD; Macedonia, 2 Pts, −2 GD; Iceland, 2 Pts, −3 GD)	Qualification phase 2
2	Macedonia	3	2	0	1	67	67	0	4	Qualification phase 2
3	Iceland	3	2	0	1	72	67	+5	4	
4	Faroe Islands (H)	3	0	0	3	55	74	−19	0	

Source: Eurohandball
Rules for classification: 1) points; 2) head-to-head points; 3) head-to-head goal difference; 4) head-to-head number of goals scored; 5) goal difference.
(H) Hosts
Notes:

2 December 2016; 18:00	Austria	24–28	Iceland	Hollin a Halsi, Tórshavn; Attendance: 50; Referees: Chrzan, Janas (POL)
2 December 2016; 18:00	Goricanec 8	(12–12)	Haraldsdóttir, Knútsdóttir 5	Hollin a Halsi, Tórshavn; Attendance: 50; Referees: Chrzan, Janas (POL)
2 December 2016; 18:00	2× (yellow card) 2× (suspension)	Report	2× (yellow card) 3× (suspension)	Hollin a Halsi, Tórshavn; Attendance: 50; Referees: Chrzan, Janas (POL)

2 December 2016; 20:00	Macedonia	21–19	Faroe Islands	Hollin a Halsi, Tórshavn; Attendance: 200; Referees: Mandák, Rudinský (SVK)
2 December 2016; 20:00	Ristovska 6	(8–8)	Brimnes 6	Hollin a Halsi, Tórshavn; Attendance: 200; Referees: Mandák, Rudinský (SVK)
2 December 2016; 20:00	2× (yellow card) 3× (suspension)	Report	2× (yellow card) 3× (suspension)	Hollin a Halsi, Tórshavn; Attendance: 200; Referees: Mandák, Rudinský (SVK)

3 December 2016; 15:00	Austria	28–19	Macedonia	Hollin a Halsi, Tórshavn; Attendance: 50; Referees: Chrzan, Janas (POL)
3 December 2016; 15:00	Frey 8	(14–10)	Ristovska 8	Hollin a Halsi, Tórshavn; Attendance: 50; Referees: Chrzan, Janas (POL)
3 December 2016; 15:00	2× (yellow card) 6× (suspension)	Report	3× (yellow card) 5× (suspension)	Hollin a Halsi, Tórshavn; Attendance: 50; Referees: Chrzan, Janas (POL)

3 December 2016; 17:00	Iceland	24–16	Faroe Islands	Hollin a Halsi, Tórshavn; Attendance: 150; Referees: Mandák, Rudinský (SVK)
3 December 2016; 17:00	Stefánsdóttir 7	(9–5)	Henneberg 7	Hollin a Halsi, Tórshavn; Attendance: 150; Referees: Mandák, Rudinský (SVK)
3 December 2016; 17:00	3× (yellow card) 5× (suspension)	Report	2× (yellow card) 4× (suspension)	Hollin a Halsi, Tórshavn; Attendance: 150; Referees: Mandák, Rudinský (SVK)

4 December 2016; 16:00	Iceland	20–27	Macedonia	Hollin a Halsi, Tórshavn; Attendance: 60; Referees: Mandák, Rudinský (SVK)
4 December 2016; 16:00	Knútsdóttir, Stefánsdóttir 5	(11–15)	Ristovska 10	Hollin a Halsi, Tórshavn; Attendance: 60; Referees: Mandák, Rudinský (SVK)
4 December 2016; 16:00	3× (yellow card) 3× (suspension)	Report	3× (yellow card) 3× (suspension)	Hollin a Halsi, Tórshavn; Attendance: 60; Referees: Mandák, Rudinský (SVK)

4 December 2016; 18:00	Faroe Islands	20–29	Austria	Hollin a Halsi, Tórshavn; Attendance: 180; Referees: Chrzan, Janas (POL)
4 December 2016; 18:00	Henneberg 6	(10–18)	Goricanec 5	Hollin a Halsi, Tórshavn; Attendance: 180; Referees: Chrzan, Janas (POL)
4 December 2016; 18:00	3× (yellow card) 3× (suspension)	Report	2× (yellow card) 4× (suspension)	Hollin a Halsi, Tórshavn; Attendance: 180; Referees: Chrzan, Janas (POL)

=== Group 4 ===
Pos	Team	Pld	W	D	L	GF	GA	GD	Pts	Qualification
1	Italy (H)	2	1	1	0	51	46	+5	3	Qualification phase 2
2	Portugal	2	1	0	1	55	43	+12	2	
3	Israel	2	0	1	1	44	61	−17	1	

Source: Eurohandball
Rules for classification: 1) points; 2) head-to-head points; 3) head-to-head goal difference; 4) head-to-head number of goals scored; 5) goal difference.
(H) Hosts

25 November 2016; 18:00	Israel	26–26	Italy	Palasport Concetto Lo Bello, Syracuse; Attendance: 500; Referees: Vujačić, Kažanegra (MNE)
25 November 2016; 18:00	Conen 7	(12–12)	Gheorghe 8	Palasport Concetto Lo Bello, Syracuse; Attendance: 500; Referees: Vujačić, Kažanegra (MNE)
25 November 2016; 18:00	3× (yellow card) 4× (suspension)	Report	3× (yellow card) 3× (suspension)	Palasport Concetto Lo Bello, Syracuse; Attendance: 500; Referees: Vujačić, Kažanegra (MNE)

26 November 2016; 20:00	Portugal	35–18	Israel	Palasport Concetto Lo Bello, Syracuse; Attendance: 200; Referees: Vujačić, Kažanegra (MNE)
26 November 2016; 20:00	Soares 5	(19–10)	Vakrat 7	Palasport Concetto Lo Bello, Syracuse; Attendance: 200; Referees: Vujačić, Kažanegra (MNE)
26 November 2016; 20:00	3× (yellow card) 1× (suspension)	Report	2× (yellow card) 3× (suspension)	Palasport Concetto Lo Bello, Syracuse; Attendance: 200; Referees: Vujačić, Kažanegra (MNE)

27 November 2016; 16:30	Italy	25–20	Portugal	Palasport Concetto Lo Bello, Syracuse; Attendance: 1,000; Referees: Vujačić, Kažanegra (MNE)
27 November 2016; 16:30	Niederwieser 10	(12–12)	Soares 6	Palasport Concetto Lo Bello, Syracuse; Attendance: 1,000; Referees: Vujačić, Kažanegra (MNE)
27 November 2016; 16:30	3× (yellow card) 2× (suspension)	Report	3× (yellow card) 4× (suspension)	Palasport Concetto Lo Bello, Syracuse; Attendance: 1,000; Referees: Vujačić, Kažanegra (MNE)

== Qualification phase 2 ==
The draw was held on 17 December 2016 at Gothenburg. The teams played a home-and away series to determine the final tournament participants.

=== Seedings ===
Pot 1 (9 best ranked teams from the 2016 European Championship)	Pot 2 (2 lowest ranked teams from the 2016 European Championship + teams from the qualification round)
Czech Republic; Hungary; Montenegro; Romania; Russia; Serbia; Slovenia; Spain; Sweden	Austria; Belarus; Croatia; Italy; Macedonia; Poland; Slovakia; Turkey; Ukraine

=== Overview ===
Team 1	Agg.	Team 2	1st leg	2nd leg
Montenegro	56–51	Belarus	33–26	23–25
Italy	39–67	Serbia	23–33	16–34
Russia	63–48	Poland	31–20	32–28
Hungary	52–43	Slovakia	28–19	24–24
Romania	67–53	Austria	34–29	33–24
Ukraine	44–46	Spain	24–24	20–22
Croatia	51–55	Slovenia	23–28	28–27
Czech Republic	60–48	Turkey	29–25	31–23
Macedonia	47–77	Sweden	20–31	27–46

All times are local.

=== Matches ===
9 June 2017; 19:00	Montenegro	33–26	Belarus	Topolica Sport Hall, Bar; Attendance: 2,000; Referees: Florescu, Stoia (ROU)
9 June 2017; 19:00	Jauković, Ujkić 9	(12–15)	Mazgo 5	Topolica Sport Hall, Bar; Attendance: 2,000; Referees: Florescu, Stoia (ROU)
9 June 2017; 19:00	3× (yellow card) 2× (suspension)	Report	3× (yellow card) 3× (suspension)	Topolica Sport Hall, Bar; Attendance: 2,000; Referees: Florescu, Stoia (ROU)

15 June 2017; 18:00	Belarus	25–23	Montenegro	Minsk Sports Palace, Minsk; Attendance: 1,800; Referees: Jurinović, Mrvica (CRO)
15 June 2017; 18:00	Vasileuskaya, Yezhykava 4	(11–10)	three players 5	Minsk Sports Palace, Minsk; Attendance: 1,800; Referees: Jurinović, Mrvica (CRO)
15 June 2017; 18:00	3× (yellow card) 3× (suspension)	Report	3× (yellow card) 4× (suspension)	Minsk Sports Palace, Minsk; Attendance: 1,800; Referees: Jurinović, Mrvica (CRO)

Montenegro won 56–51 on aggregate.

10 June 2017; 16:30	Italy	23–33	Serbia	Kioene Arena, Padua; Attendance: 3,200; Referees: Aliyev, Aghakishiyev (AZE)
10 June 2017; 16:30	Del Balzo, Rotondo 7	(11–16)	Nikolić, Pop-Lazić 5	Kioene Arena, Padua; Attendance: 3,200; Referees: Aliyev, Aghakishiyev (AZE)
10 June 2017; 16:30	3× (yellow card) 3× (suspension)	Report	3× (yellow card) 4× (suspension)	Kioene Arena, Padua; Attendance: 3,200; Referees: Aliyev, Aghakishiyev (AZE)

14 June 2017; 18:00	Serbia	34–16	Italy	Čair Sports Center, Niš; Attendance: 2,000; Referees: Panayides, Andreou (CYP)
14 June 2017; 18:00	Stoiljković 5	(14–4)	Rotondo 6	Čair Sports Center, Niš; Attendance: 2,000; Referees: Panayides, Andreou (CYP)
14 June 2017; 18:00	3× (yellow card) 2× (suspension)	Report	3× (yellow card) 3× (suspension)	Čair Sports Center, Niš; Attendance: 2,000; Referees: Panayides, Andreou (CYP)

Serbia won 67–39 on aggregate.

9 June 2017; 19:00	Russia	31–20	Poland	Sportcomplex Zvezdniy, Astrakhan; Attendance: 6,000; Referees: Herczeg, Südi (HUN)
9 June 2017; 19:00	Samokhina 9	(15–14)	Achruk 5	Sportcomplex Zvezdniy, Astrakhan; Attendance: 6,000; Referees: Herczeg, Südi (HUN)
9 June 2017; 19:00	3× (yellow card) 3× (suspension)	Report	3× (yellow card) 4× (suspension)	Sportcomplex Zvezdniy, Astrakhan; Attendance: 6,000; Referees: Herczeg, Südi (HUN)

15 June 2017; 18:30	Poland	28–32	Russia	Hala Widowiskowo-Sportowa w Koszalinie, Koszalin; Attendance: 2,900; Referees: Marić, Mašić (SRB)
15 June 2017; 18:30	Achruk 7	(14–15)	Samokhina, Sen 5	Hala Widowiskowo-Sportowa w Koszalinie, Koszalin; Attendance: 2,900; Referees: Marić, Mašić (SRB)
15 June 2017; 18:30	2× (yellow card) 2× (suspension)	Report	3× (yellow card) 5× (suspension)	Hala Widowiskowo-Sportowa w Koszalinie, Koszalin; Attendance: 2,900; Referees: Marić, Mašić (SRB)

Russia won 63–48 on aggregate.

10 June 2017; 17:00	Hungary	28–19	Slovakia	Debreceni Főnix Csarnok, Debrecen; Attendance: 3,822; Referees: Pavićević, Ražnatović (MNE)
10 June 2017; 17:00	Görbicz 9	(14–8)	Školková 6	Debreceni Főnix Csarnok, Debrecen; Attendance: 3,822; Referees: Pavićević, Ražnatović (MNE)
10 June 2017; 17:00	2× (yellow card) 3× (suspension)	Report	2× (yellow card) 8× (suspension)	Debreceni Főnix Csarnok, Debrecen; Attendance: 3,822; Referees: Pavićević, Ražnatović (MNE)

14 June 2017; 18:00	Slovakia	24–24	Hungary	Bratislava; Attendance: 8,000; Referees: Pandžić, Satordzija (BIH)
14 June 2017; 18:00	Školková 6	(10–11)	Görbicz 8	Bratislava; Attendance: 8,000; Referees: Pandžić, Satordzija (BIH)
14 June 2017; 18:00	3× (yellow card) 5× (suspension) 1× (red card)	Report	3× (yellow card) 5× (suspension)	Bratislava; Attendance: 8,000; Referees: Pandžić, Satordzija (BIH)

Hungary won 52–43 on aggregate.

9 June 2017; 20:00	Romania	34–29	Austria	Arena Antonio Alexe, Oradea; Attendance: 2,400; Referees: Sager, Styger (SUI)
9 June 2017; 20:00	Ardean-Elisei, Neagu 7	(17–16)	Kovacs 10	Arena Antonio Alexe, Oradea; Attendance: 2,400; Referees: Sager, Styger (SUI)
9 June 2017; 20:00	3× (yellow card) 3× (suspension)	Report	3× (yellow card) 4× (suspension)	Arena Antonio Alexe, Oradea; Attendance: 2,400; Referees: Sager, Styger (SUI)

13 June 2017; 19:35	Austria	24–33	Romania	Sportzentrum Alte Au, Stockerau; Attendance: 1,500; Referees: Rakytina, Tkachuk (UKR)
13 June 2017; 19:35	Kovacs 6	(13–11)	Neagu 6	Sportzentrum Alte Au, Stockerau; Attendance: 1,500; Referees: Rakytina, Tkachuk (UKR)
13 June 2017; 19:35	3× (yellow card) 1× (suspension)	Report	3× (yellow card) 4× (suspension)	Sportzentrum Alte Au, Stockerau; Attendance: 1,500; Referees: Rakytina, Tkachuk (UKR)

Romania won 67–53 on aggregate.

9 June 2017; 19:00	Ukraine	24–24	Spain	Sport Manezh of Sumy State University, Sumy; Attendance: 1,500; Referees: Mertinian, Syrepisios (GRE)
9 June 2017; 19:00	Borshchenko 9	(10–16)	Cabral, Martín 5	Sport Manezh of Sumy State University, Sumy; Attendance: 1,500; Referees: Mertinian, Syrepisios (GRE)
9 June 2017; 19:00	3× (yellow card) 5× (suspension)	Report	3× (yellow card) 4× (suspension)	Sport Manezh of Sumy State University, Sumy; Attendance: 1,500; Referees: Mertinian, Syrepisios (GRE)

14 June 2017; 21:00	Spain	22–20	Ukraine	Pabellón Polideportivo Municipal Fernando Argüelles, Antequera; Attendance: 2,000; Referees: Harabagiu, Stănescu (ROU)
14 June 2017; 21:00	Cabral 7	(14–5)	Borshchenko 6	Pabellón Polideportivo Municipal Fernando Argüelles, Antequera; Attendance: 2,000; Referees: Harabagiu, Stănescu (ROU)
14 June 2017; 21:00	2× (yellow card) 6× (suspension)	Report	3× (yellow card) 4× (suspension)	Pabellón Polideportivo Municipal Fernando Argüelles, Antequera; Attendance: 2,000; Referees: Harabagiu, Stănescu (ROU)

Spain won 46–44 on aggregate.

10 June 2017; 18:00	Croatia	23–28	Slovenia	Gradski Vrt Hall, Osijek; Attendance: 2,000; Referees: Alpaidze, Berezkina (RUS)
10 June 2017; 18:00	Plahinek 5	(10–15)	Irman, Mavsar 6	Gradski Vrt Hall, Osijek; Attendance: 2,000; Referees: Alpaidze, Berezkina (RUS)
10 June 2017; 18:00	2× (yellow card) 5× (suspension)	Report	3× (yellow card) 7× (suspension)	Gradski Vrt Hall, Osijek; Attendance: 2,000; Referees: Alpaidze, Berezkina (RUS)

15 June 2017; 18:00	Slovenia	27–28	Croatia	Golovec Hall, Celje; Attendance: 1,100; Referees: Horváth, Marton (HUN)
15 June 2017; 18:00	Mavsar, Stanko 7	(12–16)	Kožnjak, Marić 6	Golovec Hall, Celje; Attendance: 1,100; Referees: Horváth, Marton (HUN)
15 June 2017; 18:00	2× (yellow card) 4× (suspension) 1× (red card)	Report	3× (yellow card) 3× (suspension)	Golovec Hall, Celje; Attendance: 1,100; Referees: Horváth, Marton (HUN)

Slovenia won 55–51 on aggregate.

10 June 2017; 18:30	Czech Republic	29–25	Turkey	Sportovní hala Most, Most; Attendance: 600; Referees: Antić, Jakovljević (SRB)
10 June 2017; 18:30	Hrbková 11	(15–15)	İskit, Özel 6	Sportovní hala Most, Most; Attendance: 600; Referees: Antić, Jakovljević (SRB)
10 June 2017; 18:30	3× (yellow card) 1× (suspension)	Report	2× (yellow card) 3× (suspension)	Sportovní hala Most, Most; Attendance: 600; Referees: Antić, Jakovljević (SRB)

15 June 2017; 19:00	Turkey	23–31	Czech Republic	THF Sport Hall, Ankara; Attendance: 800; Referees: Barysas, Petrušis (LTU)
15 June 2017; 19:00	Yılmaz 6	(15–14)	Hrbková, Malá 8	THF Sport Hall, Ankara; Attendance: 800; Referees: Barysas, Petrušis (LTU)
15 June 2017; 19:00	3× (yellow card) 2× (suspension)	Report	2× (yellow card) 2× (suspension)	THF Sport Hall, Ankara; Attendance: 800; Referees: Barysas, Petrušis (LTU)

Czech Republic won 60–48 on aggregate.

10 June 2017; 20:30	Macedonia	20–31	Sweden	SRC Kale, Skopje; Attendance: 1,700; Referees: Vranes, Wenninger (AUT)
10 June 2017; 20:30	Gjorgjievska 7	(9–12)	four players 4	SRC Kale, Skopje; Attendance: 1,700; Referees: Vranes, Wenninger (AUT)
10 June 2017; 20:30	3× (yellow card) 4× (suspension)	Report	2× (yellow card) 2× (suspension)	SRC Kale, Skopje; Attendance: 1,700; Referees: Vranes, Wenninger (AUT)

13 June 2017; 19:15	Sweden	46–27	Macedonia	Ystad Arena, Ystad; Attendance: 2,164; Referees: Bounouara, Sami (FRA)
13 June 2017; 19:15	Sand 9	(26–11)	Bajramoska, Ristovska 6	Ystad Arena, Ystad; Attendance: 2,164; Referees: Bounouara, Sami (FRA)
13 June 2017; 19:15	3× (yellow card) 4× (suspension)	Report	3× (yellow card) 4× (suspension)	Ystad Arena, Ystad; Attendance: 2,164; Referees: Bounouara, Sami (FRA)

Sweden won 77–47 on aggregate.
