= Martine Smeets =

Dutch handball player (born 1990)

Personal information
- Nationality: Dutch
- Born: 5 May 1990 (age 36) Almelo, Netherlands
- Height: 1.72 m (5 ft 8 in)

Sport
- Sport: Handball
- Position: Left wing
- Current club: CSM București
- Number: 24

Youth career
- Years: Team
- –: Stevo Geesteren

Senior clubs
- Years: Team
- 2007–2008: E&O Emmen
- 2008–2013: SV Dalfsen Handbal
- 2013–2015: Thüringer HC
- 2015–2018: SG BBM Bietigheim
- 2018–2020: Molde Elite
- 2020: Metz Handball
- 2020–2022: CSM București
National team
Years	Team	Apps	(Gls)
2012–2021	Netherlands	117	(144)
Medal record
World Championship
Gold medal – first place	2019 Japan
Silver medal – second place	2015 Denmark
Bronze medal – third place	2017 Germany
European Championship
Bronze medal – third place	2018 France

Martine Smeets (born 5 May 1990) is a Dutch former handballer who played as a left wing for the Dutch national team.

She was a part the Netherlands team that won the 2019 World Women's Handball Championship; the first title in the country's history.

== Career ==
Smeets started playing handball at Stevo Geesteren in 1995. In 2007 she joined E&O Emmen, and in 2008 she joined SV Dalfsen Handbal. Here she won the Dutch Championship in 2010, 2011 and 2012 and the Dutch Cup in 2011 and 2012.

In 2013 she joined German team Thüringer HC. Here she won the 2014 and 2015 Bundesliga. In 2015 she joined league rivals SG BBM Bietigheim. Here she won the 2017 Bundesliga.

In 2018 she joined Norwegian Molde HK. In January 2020 she moved to French top team Metz Handball to replace the injured Manon Houette. In 2020 she joined Romanian CSM Bucuresti. Here she won the 2021 Romanian Championship and the 2022 Romanian Handball Cup. In 2022 she retired due to a knee injury.

== National team ==
Smeets' first major international tournament was the 2013 World Championship. A year later she played at the 2014 European Championship.

At the 2015 World Women's Handball Championship she won silver medals with the Dutch team, losing to Norway in the final.

She also represented Netherlands at the 2016 Olympics. A year later she won bronze medals at the 2017 World Championship. She won another bronze medal at the 2018 European Championship.

At the 2019 World Championship she won gold medals, which was the first for Netherlands.

Her last major international tournament was the 2020 Olympics. She retired from the Dutch national team shortly after due to a Cruciate ligament injury.

== Honours ==
- Dutch Championship
  - Winner: 2010, 2011, 2012
- Dutch Cup:
  - Winner: 2011, 2012
- German Championship
- Winner: 2014, 2015, 2017
- Romanian Championship
  - Winner: 2021
- Romanian Cup
  - Winner: 2022
- EHF Cup:
  - Finalist: 2017
- World Championship:
  - Gold Medalist: 2019
  - Silver Medalist: 2015
  - Bronze Medalist: 2017
- European Championship:
  - Bronze Medalist: 2018
