= 2017 World Women's Handball Championship =

2017 edition of the World Women's Handball Championship

Tournament details
- Host country: Germany
- Venues: 6 (in 6 host cities)
- Dates: 1–17 December
- Teams: 24 (from 4 confederations)

Final positions
- Champions: France (2nd title)
- Runners-up: Norway
- Third place: Netherlands
- Fourth place: Sweden

Tournament statistics
- Matches played: 84
- Goals scored: 4,384 (52.19 per match)
- Attendance: 236,613 (2,817 per match)
- Top scorer(s): (Norway) Nora Mørk (66 goals)

Awards
- Best player: (Norway) Stine Bredal Oftedal

The 2017 IHF World Women's Handball Championship, the 23rd event hosted by the International Handball Federation, was held in Germany from 1 to 17 December 2017. Germany was the only applicant for this championship. Germany was host of the World Championships in 1965 and 1997.

France won their second title after 2003, by defeating reigning champions Norway 23–21 in the final.

== Venues ==
The tournament is being played in the following venues: Bietigheim-Bissingen, Magdeburg, Oldenburg, Leipzig, Trier and Hamburg as the final four venue.

Bietigheim-Bissingen	Hamburg	2017 World Women's Handball Championship is located in Germany
EgeTrans Arena; Capacity: 4,500	Barclaycard Arena; Capacity: 12,500	2017 World Women's Handball Championship is located in Germany
Magdeburg	Oldenburg	2017 World Women's Handball Championship is located in Germany
GETEC Arena; Capacity: 6,200	EWE Arena; Capacity: 5,250	2017 World Women's Handball Championship is located in Germany
Leipzig	Trier	2017 World Women's Handball Championship is located in Germany
Arena Leipzig; Capacity: 6,250	Trier Arena; Capacity: 4,100	2017 World Women's Handball Championship is located in Germany

== Qualification ==
Competition	Dates	Vacancies	Qualified
Host nation	15 December 2011	1	Germany
2015 World Championship	5–20 December 2015	1	Norway
2016 African Women's Handball Championship	28 November – 7 December 2016	3	Angola; Cameroon; Tunisia
2016 European Women's Handball Championship	4–18 December 2016	3	Denmark; France; Netherlands
2017 Asian Women's Handball Championship	13–22 March 2017	3	China; Japan; South Korea
European qualification	9–15 June 2017	9	Czech Republic; Hungary; Montenegro; Romania; Russia; Serbia; Slovenia; Spain; Sweden
2017 Pan American Women's Handball Championship	18–25 June 2017	3	Argentina; Brazil; Paraguay
Wild card		1	Poland

== Qualified teams ==
Country	Qualified as	Qualification date	Previous appearances in tournament^{1}
Germany	Host	15 December 2011	11 (**1993**, 1995, 1997, 1999, 2003, 2005, 2007, 2009, 2011, 2013, 2015)
Norway	2015 World Champion	20 December 2015	18 (1971, 1973, 1975, 1982, 1986, 1990, 1993, 1995, 1997, **1999**, 2001, 2003, 2005, 2007, 2009, **2011**, 2013, **2015**)
Angola	Finalist of 2016 African Championship	5 December 2016	13 (1990, 1993, 1995, 1997, 1999, 2001, 2003, 2005, 2007, 2009, 2011, 2013, 2015)
Tunisia	Finalist of 2016 African Championship	5 December 2016	8 (1975, 2001, 2003, 2007, 2009, 2011, 2013, 2015)
Cameroon	Third place of 2016 African Championship	7 December 2016	1 (2005)
Netherlands	Semifinalist of 2016 European Championship	14 December 2016	10 (1971, 1973, 1978, 1986, 1999, 2001, 2005, 2011, 2013, 2015)
Denmark	Semifinalist of 2016 European Championship	14 December 2016	18 (1957, 1962, 1965, 1971, 1973, 1975, 1990, 1993, 1995, **1997**, 1999, 2001, 2003, 2005, 2009, 2011, 2013, 2015)
France	Semifinalist of 2016 European Championship	14 December 2016	12 (1986, 1990, 1997, 1999, 2001, **2003**, 2005, 2007, 2009, 2011, 2013, 2015)
South Korea	Finalist of 2017 Asian Championship	20 March 2017	16 (1978, 1982, 1986, 1990, 1993, **1995**, 1997, 1999, 2001, 2003, 2005, 2007, 2009, 2011, 2013, 2015)
Japan	Finalist of 2017 Asian Championship	20 March 2017	17 (1962, 1965, 1971, 1973, 1975, 1986, 1995, 1997, 1999, 2001, 2003, 2005, 2007, 2009, 2011, 2013, 2015)
China	Third place of 2017 Asian Championship	22 March 2017	14 (1986, 1990, 1993, 1995, 1997, 1999, 2001, 2003, 2005, 2007, 2009, 2011, 2013, 2015)
Sweden	European playoff winner	13 June 2017	8 (1957, 1990, 1993, 1995, 2001, 2009, 2011, 2015)
Romania	European playoff winner	13 June 2017	22 (1957, **1962**, 1965, 1971, 1973, 1975, 1978, 1982, 1986, 1990, 1993, 1995, 1997, 1999, 2001, 2003, 2005, 2007, 2009, 2011, 2013, 2015)
Serbia	European playoff winner	14 June 2017	2 (2013, 2015)
Hungary	European playoff winner	14 June 2017	20 (1957, 1962, **1965**, 1971, 1973, 1975, 1978, 1982, 1986, 1993, 1995, 1997, 1999, 2001, 2003, 2005, 2007, 2009, 2013, 2015)
Spain	European playoff winner	14 June 2017	8 (1993, 2001, 2003, 2007, 2009, 2011, 2013, 2015)
Montenegro	European playoff winner	15 June 2017	3 (2011, 2013, 2015)
Slovenia	European playoff winner	15 June 2017	4 (1997, 2001, 2003, 2005)
Czech Republic	European playoff winner	15 June 2017	5 (1995, 1997, 1999, 2003, 2013)
Russia	European playoff winner	15 June 2017	11 (1993, 1995, 1997, 1999, **2001**, 2003, **2005**, **2007**, **2009**, 2011, 2015)
Poland	Wildcard	23 June 2017	15 (1957, 1962, 1965, 1973, 1975, 1978, 1986, 1990, 1993, 1997, 1999, 2005, 2007, 2013, 2015)
Brazil	Finalist of 2017 Pan American Championship	24 June 2017	11 (1995, 1997, 1999, 2001, 2003, 2005, 2007, 2009, 2011, **2013**, 2015)
Argentina	Finalist of 2017 Pan American Championship	24 June 2017	8 (1999, 2003, 2005, 2007, 2009, 2011, 2013, 2015)
Paraguay	Third place of 2017 Pan American Championship	25 June 2017	2 (2007, 2013)

^{1} Bold indicates champion for that year, Italics indicates host for that year.

== Draw ==
The draw was held on 27 June 2017 at Hamburg, Germany.

=== Seeding ===
The seeding was announced on 26 June 2017.

Pot 1	Pot 2	Pot 3	Pot 4	Pot 5	Pot 6
Norway; Netherlands; France; Denmark	Romania; Germany; Russia; Sweden	Serbia; Czech Republic; Spain; Brazil	Hungary; Montenegro; Slovenia; South Korea	Angola; Japan; Argentina; China	Paraguay; Tunisia; Cameroon; Poland

== Referees ==
16 referee pairs were selected:

Referees
Argentina	Julian Grillo; Sebastián Lenci
Denmark	Karina Christiansen; Line Hansen
France	Charlotte Bonaventura; Julie Bonaventura
Germany	Robert Schulze; Tobias Tönnies
Hungary	Péter Horváth; Balázs Márton
Japan	Koyoshi Hizaki; Tomokazu Ikebuchi
Montenegro	Ivan Pavićević; Miloš Ražnatović
Norway	Kjersti Arntsen; Guro Røen

Referees
Russia	Viktoria Alpaidze; Tatiana Berezkina
Slovenia	Bojan Lah; David Sok
Serbia	Vanja Antić; Jelena Jakovljević
South Korea	Koo Bon-ok; Lee Se-ok
Spain	Ignacio García; Andreu Marín
Sweden	Mirza Kurtagic; Mattias Wetterwik
Tunisia	Samir Krichen; Samir Makhlouf
Turkey	Kürşad Erdoğan; Ibrahim Özdeniz

== Preliminary round ==
The schedule was announced on 30 June 2017 with the exact throw-off times confirmed on 10 July 2017.

All times are local (UTC+1).

=== Group A ===
Pos	Team	Pld	W	D	L	GF	GA	GD	Pts	Qualification
1	Romania	5	4	0	1	123	112	+11	8	Round of 16
2	France	5	3	1	1	135	98	+37	7 (Note: Spain 25–25 France)	Round of 16
3	Spain	5	3	1	1	135	109	+26	7	Round of 16
4	Slovenia	5	3	0	2	138	134	+4	6	Round of 16
5	Angola	5	1	0	4	124	141	−17	2	
6	Paraguay	5	0	0	5	95	156	−61	0	

Source: IHF
Rules for classification: 1) points; 2) head-to-head points; 3) head-to-head goal difference; 4) head-to-head number of goals scored; 5) Goal difference.
Notes:

2 December 2017; 14:00	Romania	29–17	Paraguay	Trier Arena, Trier; Attendance: 2,369; Referees: Hizaki, Ikebuchi (JPN)
2 December 2017; 14:00	Florianu 5	(16–7)	Fiore 7	Trier Arena, Trier; Attendance: 2,369; Referees: Hizaki, Ikebuchi (JPN)
2 December 2017; 14:00	4× (yellow card) 3× (suspension)	Report	1× (yellow card)	Trier Arena, Trier; Attendance: 2,369; Referees: Hizaki, Ikebuchi (JPN)

2 December 2017; 18:00	France	23–24	Slovenia	Trier Arena, Trier; Attendance: 3,317; Referees: Grillo, Lenci (ARG)
2 December 2017; 18:00	Landre, Niombla 4	(10–13)	Gros 9	Trier Arena, Trier; Attendance: 3,317; Referees: Grillo, Lenci (ARG)
2 December 2017; 18:00	2× (yellow card) 1× (suspension)	Report	4× (yellow card) 3× (suspension)	Trier Arena, Trier; Attendance: 3,317; Referees: Grillo, Lenci (ARG)

2 December 2017; 20:30	Spain	28–24	Angola	Trier Arena, Trier; Attendance: 3,042; Referees: Pavićević, Ražnatović (MNE)
2 December 2017; 20:30	Martín 9	(15–13)	Cazanga 7	Trier Arena, Trier; Attendance: 3,042; Referees: Pavićević, Ražnatović (MNE)
2 December 2017; 20:30	3× (yellow card) 6× (suspension)	Report	2× (yellow card) 4× (suspension)	Trier Arena, Trier; Attendance: 3,042; Referees: Pavićević, Ražnatović (MNE)

3 December 2017; 14:00	Slovenia	28–31	Romania	Trier Arena, Trier; Attendance: 2,411; Referees: Pavićević, Ražnatović (MNE)
3 December 2017; 14:00	Gros 10	(14–14)	Neagu 11	Trier Arena, Trier; Attendance: 2,411; Referees: Pavićević, Ražnatović (MNE)
3 December 2017; 14:00	1× (yellow card) 4× (suspension)	Report	4× (yellow card) 3× (suspension)	Trier Arena, Trier; Attendance: 2,411; Referees: Pavićević, Ražnatović (MNE)

3 December 2017; 18:00	Angola	19–26	France	Trier Arena, Trier; Attendance: 2,227; Referees: Krichen, Makhlouf (TUN)
3 December 2017; 18:00	Cazanga 4	(10–11)	Lacrabère 7	Trier Arena, Trier; Attendance: 2,227; Referees: Krichen, Makhlouf (TUN)
3 December 2017; 18:00	4× (yellow card) 2× (suspension) 1× (red card)	Report	2× (yellow card) 3× (suspension)	Trier Arena, Trier; Attendance: 2,227; Referees: Krichen, Makhlouf (TUN)

3 December 2017; 20:30	Paraguay	15–32	Spain	Trier Arena, Trier; Attendance: 1,723; Referees: Grillo, Lenci (ARG)
3 December 2017; 20:30	Acuña, Fiore 4	(6–16)	Arderíus 7	Trier Arena, Trier; Attendance: 1,723; Referees: Grillo, Lenci (ARG)
3 December 2017; 20:30	2× (yellow card) 7× (suspension) 1× (red card)	Report	1× (yellow card) 4× (suspension)	Trier Arena, Trier; Attendance: 1,723; Referees: Grillo, Lenci (ARG)

5 December 2017; 14:00	Slovenia	32–25	Angola	Trier Arena, Trier; Attendance: 1,303; Referees: Pavićević, Ražnatović (MNE)
5 December 2017; 14:00	Gros 7	(15–15)	Cazanga 6	Trier Arena, Trier; Attendance: 1,303; Referees: Pavićević, Ražnatović (MNE)
5 December 2017; 14:00	4× (yellow card) 4× (suspension)	Report	3× (yellow card) 6× (suspension)	Trier Arena, Trier; Attendance: 1,303; Referees: Pavićević, Ražnatović (MNE)

5 December 2017; 18:00	France	35–13	Paraguay	Trier Arena, Trier; Attendance: 1,678; Referees: Hizaki, Ikebuchi (JPN)
5 December 2017; 18:00	Houette 9	(14–10)	Acuña, Fiore 3	Trier Arena, Trier; Attendance: 1,678; Referees: Hizaki, Ikebuchi (JPN)
5 December 2017; 18:00	1× (yellow card) 4× (suspension)	Report	1× (yellow card) 2× (suspension)	Trier Arena, Trier; Attendance: 1,678; Referees: Hizaki, Ikebuchi (JPN)

5 December 2017; 20:30	Romania	19–17	Spain	Trier Arena, Trier; Attendance: 1,724; Referees: Grillo, Lenci (ARG)
5 December 2017; 20:30	Neagu 8	(9–7)	M. González, Pena 4	Trier Arena, Trier; Attendance: 1,724; Referees: Grillo, Lenci (ARG)
5 December 2017; 20:30	2× (yellow card) 3× (suspension)	Report	3× (yellow card) 5× (suspension)	Trier Arena, Trier; Attendance: 1,724; Referees: Grillo, Lenci (ARG)

7 December 2017; 14:00	Paraguay	22–28	Slovenia	Trier Arena, Trier; Attendance: 1,590; Referees: Krichen, Makhlouf (TUN)
7 December 2017; 14:00	Fiore 8	(9–18)	Gros, Stanko 6	Trier Arena, Trier; Attendance: 1,590; Referees: Krichen, Makhlouf (TUN)
7 December 2017; 14:00	2× (yellow card) 3× (suspension)	Report	2× (yellow card) 5× (suspension)	Trier Arena, Trier; Attendance: 1,590; Referees: Krichen, Makhlouf (TUN)

7 December 2017; 18:00	Romania	27–24	Angola	Trier Arena, Trier; Attendance: 3,123; Referees: Hizaki, Ikebuchi (JPN)
7 December 2017; 18:00	Neagu 7	(14–14)	Cazanga, Guialo 7	Trier Arena, Trier; Attendance: 3,123; Referees: Hizaki, Ikebuchi (JPN)
7 December 2017; 18:00	4× (yellow card) 2× (suspension)	Report	4× (yellow card) 4× (suspension)	Trier Arena, Trier; Attendance: 3,123; Referees: Hizaki, Ikebuchi (JPN)

7 December 2017; 20:30	Spain	25–25	France	Trier Arena, Trier; Attendance: 3,316; Referees: Pavićević, Ražnatović (MNE)
7 December 2017; 20:30	Cabral, Martín 6	(10–11)	Houette 5	Trier Arena, Trier; Attendance: 3,316; Referees: Pavićević, Ražnatović (MNE)
7 December 2017; 20:30	4× (yellow card) 3× (suspension)	Report	1× (yellow card) 2× (suspension)	Trier Arena, Trier; Attendance: 3,316; Referees: Pavićević, Ražnatović (MNE)

8 December 2017; 14:00	Angola	32–28	Paraguay	Trier Arena, Trier; Attendance: 1,123; Referees: Hizaki, Ikebuchi (JPN)
8 December 2017; 14:00	Carlos 10	(16–17)	Fiore 8	Trier Arena, Trier; Attendance: 1,123; Referees: Hizaki, Ikebuchi (JPN)
8 December 2017; 14:00	3× (yellow card) 7× (suspension)	Report	2× (yellow card) 5× (suspension) 1× (red card)	Trier Arena, Trier; Attendance: 1,123; Referees: Hizaki, Ikebuchi (JPN)

8 December 2017; 18:00	France	26–17	Romania	Trier Arena, Trier; Attendance: 3,824; Referees: Krichen, Makhlouf (TUN)
8 December 2017; 18:00	Houette 7	(17–7)	Florianu 6	Trier Arena, Trier; Attendance: 3,824; Referees: Krichen, Makhlouf (TUN)
8 December 2017; 18:00	2× (yellow card)	Report	3× (yellow card) 4× (suspension)	Trier Arena, Trier; Attendance: 3,824; Referees: Krichen, Makhlouf (TUN)

8 December 2017; 20:30	Spain	33–26	Slovenia	Trier Arena, Trier; Attendance: 3,422; Referees: Kurtagic, Wetterwik (SWE)
8 December 2017; 20:30	Pena 9	(13–14)	Gros, Stanko 7	Trier Arena, Trier; Attendance: 3,422; Referees: Kurtagic, Wetterwik (SWE)
8 December 2017; 20:30	2× (yellow card) 4× (suspension)	Report	2× (yellow card) 2× (suspension)	Trier Arena, Trier; Attendance: 3,422; Referees: Kurtagic, Wetterwik (SWE)

=== Group B ===
Pos	Team	Pld	W	D	L	GF	GA	GD	Pts	Qualification
1	Sweden	5	4	0	1	160	139	+21	8 (Note: Norway 28–31 Sweden)	Round of 16
2	Norway	5	4	0	1	163	110	+53	8	Round of 16
3	Hungary	5	3	0	2	138	127	+11	6	Round of 16
4	Czech Republic	5	2	0	3	134	147	−13	4 (Note: Poland 25–29 Czech Republic)	Round of 16
5	Poland	5	2	0	3	144	145	−1	4	
6	Argentina	5	0	0	5	102	173	−71	0	

Source: IHF
Rules for classification: 1) points; 2) head-to-head points; 3) head-to-head goal difference; 4) head-to-head number of goals scored; 5) Goal difference.
Notes:

2 December 2017; 14:00	Czech Republic	28–22	Argentina	EgeTrans Arena, Bietigheim-Bissingen; Attendance: 2,363; Referees: Koo, Lee (KOR)
2 December 2017; 14:00	Ryšánková 7	(15–9)	Mendoza 4	EgeTrans Arena, Bietigheim-Bissingen; Attendance: 2,363; Referees: Koo, Lee (KOR)
2 December 2017; 14:00	2× (yellow card) 1× (suspension)	Report	3× (yellow card)	EgeTrans Arena, Bietigheim-Bissingen; Attendance: 2,363; Referees: Koo, Lee (KOR)

2 December 2017; 18:00	Sweden	30–33	Poland	EgeTrans Arena, Bietigheim-Bissingen; Attendance: 3,620; Referees: Schulze, Tönnies (GER)
2 December 2017; 18:00	three players 5	(15–17)	Achruk 9	EgeTrans Arena, Bietigheim-Bissingen; Attendance: 3,620; Referees: Schulze, Tönnies (GER)
2 December 2017; 18:00	3× (yellow card) 4× (suspension)	Report	3× (yellow card) 5× (suspension)	EgeTrans Arena, Bietigheim-Bissingen; Attendance: 3,620; Referees: Schulze, Tönnies (GER)

2 December 2017; 20:30	Norway	30–22	Hungary	EgeTrans Arena, Bietigheim-Bissingen; Attendance: 3,620; Referees: Christiansen, Hansen (DEN)
2 December 2017; 20:30	Mørk 7	(21–11)	Háfra 4	EgeTrans Arena, Bietigheim-Bissingen; Attendance: 3,620; Referees: Christiansen, Hansen (DEN)
2 December 2017; 20:30	1× (yellow card) 3× (suspension)	Report	3× (yellow card) 3× (suspension)	EgeTrans Arena, Bietigheim-Bissingen; Attendance: 3,620; Referees: Christiansen, Hansen (DEN)

3 December 2017; 14:00	Poland	25–29	Czech Republic	EgeTrans Arena, Bietigheim-Bissingen; Attendance: 2,720; Referees: Christiansen, Hansen (DEN)
3 December 2017; 14:00	Kudłacz-Gloc 6	(15–12)	Jeřábková 8	EgeTrans Arena, Bietigheim-Bissingen; Attendance: 2,720; Referees: Christiansen, Hansen (DEN)
3 December 2017; 14:00	1× (yellow card) 2× (suspension)	Report	4× (yellow card) 5× (suspension)	EgeTrans Arena, Bietigheim-Bissingen; Attendance: 2,720; Referees: Christiansen, Hansen (DEN)

3 December 2017; 18:00	Hungary	22–25	Sweden	EgeTrans Arena, Bietigheim-Bissingen; Attendance: 3,620; Referees: Koo, Lee (KOR)
3 December 2017; 18:00	Klivinyi, Schatzl 5	(11–11)	Gulldén 7	EgeTrans Arena, Bietigheim-Bissingen; Attendance: 3,620; Referees: Koo, Lee (KOR)
3 December 2017; 18:00	2× (yellow card) 7× (suspension)	Report	3× (yellow card) 3× (suspension)	EgeTrans Arena, Bietigheim-Bissingen; Attendance: 3,620; Referees: Koo, Lee (KOR)

3 December 2017; 20:30	Argentina	21–36	Norway	EgeTrans Arena, Bietigheim-Bissingen; Attendance: 3,620; Referees: Alpaidze, Berezkina (RUS)
3 December 2017; 20:30	Gavilan 4	(13–18)	Løke 7	EgeTrans Arena, Bietigheim-Bissingen; Attendance: 3,620; Referees: Alpaidze, Berezkina (RUS)
3 December 2017; 20:30	2× (yellow card) 3× (suspension)	Report	1× (yellow card) 6× (suspension)	EgeTrans Arena, Bietigheim-Bissingen; Attendance: 3,620; Referees: Alpaidze, Berezkina (RUS)

5 December 2017; 14:00	Hungary	33–15	Argentina	EgeTrans Arena, Bietigheim-Bissingen; Attendance: 2,110; Referees: Schulze, Tönnies (GER)
5 December 2017; 14:00	Kovács 7	(18–7)	Ponce de Leon 5	EgeTrans Arena, Bietigheim-Bissingen; Attendance: 2,110; Referees: Schulze, Tönnies (GER)
5 December 2017; 14:00	3× (yellow card) 4× (suspension)	Report	2× (suspension)	EgeTrans Arena, Bietigheim-Bissingen; Attendance: 2,110; Referees: Schulze, Tönnies (GER)

5 December 2017; 18:00	Sweden	36–32	Czech Republic	EgeTrans Arena, Bietigheim-Bissingen; Attendance: 2,600; Referees: Alpaidze, Berezkina (RUS)
5 December 2017; 18:00	three players 6	(16–18)	Luzumová 9	EgeTrans Arena, Bietigheim-Bissingen; Attendance: 2,600; Referees: Alpaidze, Berezkina (RUS)
5 December 2017; 18:00	2× (yellow card) 2× (suspension)	Report	2× (yellow card) 2× (suspension)	EgeTrans Arena, Bietigheim-Bissingen; Attendance: 2,600; Referees: Alpaidze, Berezkina (RUS)

5 December 2017; 20:30	Norway	35–20	Poland	EgeTrans Arena, Bietigheim-Bissingen; Attendance: 2,600; Referees: Koo, Lee (KOR)
5 December 2017; 20:30	Kristiansen 6	(18–11)	Zych 4	EgeTrans Arena, Bietigheim-Bissingen; Attendance: 2,600; Referees: Koo, Lee (KOR)
5 December 2017; 20:30	2× (yellow card) 1× (suspension)	Report	2× (yellow card)	EgeTrans Arena, Bietigheim-Bissingen; Attendance: 2,600; Referees: Koo, Lee (KOR)

7 December 2017; 14:00	Poland	28–31	Hungary	EgeTrans Arena, Bietigheim-Bissingen; Attendance: 1,570; Referees: Alpaidze, Berezkina (RUS)
7 December 2017; 14:00	Kudłacz-Gloc 8	(11–13)	Kovacsics 8	EgeTrans Arena, Bietigheim-Bissingen; Attendance: 1,570; Referees: Alpaidze, Berezkina (RUS)
7 December 2017; 14:00	2× (yellow card) 1× (suspension)	Report	3× (yellow card) 4× (suspension) 1× (red card)	EgeTrans Arena, Bietigheim-Bissingen; Attendance: 1,570; Referees: Alpaidze, Berezkina (RUS)

7 December 2017; 18:00	Sweden	38–24	Argentina	EgeTrans Arena, Bietigheim-Bissingen; Attendance: 2,200; Referees: Christiansen, Hansen (DEN)
7 December 2017; 18:00	Hagman 6	(17–13)	five players 3	EgeTrans Arena, Bietigheim-Bissingen; Attendance: 2,200; Referees: Christiansen, Hansen (DEN)
7 December 2017; 18:00	2× (yellow card) 6× (suspension) 1× (red card)	Report	1× (yellow card) 3× (suspension)	EgeTrans Arena, Bietigheim-Bissingen; Attendance: 2,200; Referees: Christiansen, Hansen (DEN)

7 December 2017; 20:30	Czech Republic	16–34	Norway	EgeTrans Arena, Bietigheim-Bissingen; Attendance: 2,300; Referees: Schulze, Tönnies (GER)
7 December 2017; 20:30	Jeřábková 4	(7–20)	Mørk 7	EgeTrans Arena, Bietigheim-Bissingen; Attendance: 2,300; Referees: Schulze, Tönnies (GER)
7 December 2017; 20:30	2× (yellow card) 7× (suspension)	Report	2× (yellow card) 4× (suspension)	EgeTrans Arena, Bietigheim-Bissingen; Attendance: 2,300; Referees: Schulze, Tönnies (GER)

8 December 2017; 14:00	Argentina	20–38	Poland	EgeTrans Arena, Bietigheim-Bissingen; Attendance: 1,100; Referees: Schulze, Tönnies (GER)
8 December 2017; 14:00	Salvadó 4	(9–19)	Kudłacz-Gloc 7	EgeTrans Arena, Bietigheim-Bissingen; Attendance: 1,100; Referees: Schulze, Tönnies (GER)
8 December 2017; 14:00	2× (yellow card) 3× (suspension)	Report	3× (suspension)	EgeTrans Arena, Bietigheim-Bissingen; Attendance: 1,100; Referees: Schulze, Tönnies (GER)

8 December 2017; 18:00	Czech Republic	29–30	Hungary	EgeTrans Arena, Bietigheim-Bissingen; Attendance: 3,620; Referees: Christiansen, Hansen (DEN)
8 December 2017; 18:00	Jeřábková 9	(14–17)	Bódi 7	EgeTrans Arena, Bietigheim-Bissingen; Attendance: 3,620; Referees: Christiansen, Hansen (DEN)
8 December 2017; 18:00	3× (yellow card) 2× (suspension)	Report	2× (yellow card) 7× (suspension)	EgeTrans Arena, Bietigheim-Bissingen; Attendance: 3,620; Referees: Christiansen, Hansen (DEN)

8 December 2017; 20:30	Norway	28–31	Sweden	EgeTrans Arena, Bietigheim-Bissingen; Attendance: 3,620; Referees: Koo, Lee (KOR)
8 December 2017; 20:30	Mørk 9	(18–16)	Gulldén 9	EgeTrans Arena, Bietigheim-Bissingen; Attendance: 3,620; Referees: Koo, Lee (KOR)
8 December 2017; 20:30	3× (yellow card) 2× (suspension)	Report	3× (yellow card) 1× (suspension)	EgeTrans Arena, Bietigheim-Bissingen; Attendance: 3,620; Referees: Koo, Lee (KOR)

=== Group C ===
Pos	Team	Pld	W	D	L	GF	GA	GD	Pts	Qualification
1	Russia	5	5	0	0	149	111	+38	10	Round of 16
2	Denmark	5	3	0	2	142	120	+22	6	Round of 16
3	Japan	5	2	1	2	134	130	+4	5 (Note: Montenegro 28–29 Japan)	Round of 16
4	Montenegro	5	2	1	2	135	127	+8	5	Round of 16
5	Brazil	5	1	2	2	110	119	−9	4	
6	Tunisia	5	0	0	5	93	156	−63	0	

Source: IHF
Rules for classification: 1) points; 2) head-to-head points; 3) head-to-head goal difference; 4) head-to-head number of goals scored; 5) Goal difference.
Notes:

2 December 2017; 14:00	Russia	36–16	Tunisia	Large EWE Arena, Oldenburg; Attendance: 2,293; Referees: Antić, Jakovljević (SRB)
2 December 2017; 14:00	four players 5	(14–9)	Chebbah 6	Large EWE Arena, Oldenburg; Attendance: 2,293; Referees: Antić, Jakovljević (SRB)
2 December 2017; 14:00	3× (yellow card) 4× (suspension)	Report	3× (yellow card) 2× (suspension)	Large EWE Arena, Oldenburg; Attendance: 2,293; Referees: Antić, Jakovljević (SRB)

2 December 2017; 17:45	Brazil	28–28	Japan	Large EWE Arena, Oldenburg; Attendance: 2,973; Referees: Bonaventura, Bonaventura (FRA)
2 December 2017; 17:45	Belo 11	(12–15)	Hara 7	Large EWE Arena, Oldenburg; Attendance: 2,973; Referees: Bonaventura, Bonaventura (FRA)
2 December 2017; 17:45	4× (yellow card) 6× (suspension) 1× (red card)	Report	2× (yellow card) 3× (suspension)	Large EWE Arena, Oldenburg; Attendance: 2,973; Referees: Bonaventura, Bonaventura (FRA)

2 December 2017; 20:30	Denmark	24–31	Montenegro	Large EWE Arena, Oldenburg; Attendance: 3,079; Referees: Horváth, Márton (HUN)
2 December 2017; 20:30	Grigel, Tranborg 5	(12–17)	Radičević 12	Large EWE Arena, Oldenburg; Attendance: 3,079; Referees: Horváth, Márton (HUN)
2 December 2017; 20:30	3× (yellow card) 5× (suspension)	Report	4× (yellow card) 5× (suspension)	Large EWE Arena, Oldenburg; Attendance: 3,079; Referees: Horváth, Márton (HUN)

3 December 2017; 14:00	Tunisia	22–23	Brazil	Large EWE Arena, Oldenburg; Attendance: 2,351; Referees: Lah, Sok (SLO)
3 December 2017; 14:00	Chebbah 7	(13–10)	Belo 7	Large EWE Arena, Oldenburg; Attendance: 2,351; Referees: Lah, Sok (SLO)
3 December 2017; 14:00	3× (yellow card) 4× (suspension)	Report	2× (yellow card) 5× (suspension)	Large EWE Arena, Oldenburg; Attendance: 2,351; Referees: Lah, Sok (SLO)

3 December 2017; 17:45	Montenegro	24–28	Russia	Large EWE Arena, Oldenburg; Attendance: 2,269; Referees: Bonaventura, Bonaventura (FRA)
3 December 2017; 17:45	Bulatović 7	(12–15)	Dmitrieva 5	Large EWE Arena, Oldenburg; Attendance: 2,269; Referees: Bonaventura, Bonaventura (FRA)
3 December 2017; 17:45	3× (yellow card) 4× (suspension)	Report	3× (yellow card) 4× (suspension)	Large EWE Arena, Oldenburg; Attendance: 2,269; Referees: Bonaventura, Bonaventura (FRA)

3 December 2017; 20:30	Japan	18–32	Denmark	Large EWE Arena, Oldenburg; Attendance: 2,389; Referees: Antić, Jakovljević (SRB)
3 December 2017; 20:30	four players 3	(5–16)	three players 5	Large EWE Arena, Oldenburg; Attendance: 2,389; Referees: Antić, Jakovljević (SRB)
3 December 2017; 20:30	2× (yellow card) 2× (suspension)	Report	1× (yellow card) 4× (suspension)	Large EWE Arena, Oldenburg; Attendance: 2,389; Referees: Antić, Jakovljević (SRB)

5 December 2017; 12:00	Montenegro	28–29	Japan	Large EWE Arena, Oldenburg; Attendance: 1,103; Referees: Lah, Sok (SLO)
5 December 2017; 12:00	Radičević 7	(15–12)	Ikehara 9	Large EWE Arena, Oldenburg; Attendance: 1,103; Referees: Lah, Sok (SLO)
5 December 2017; 12:00	3× (yellow card) 3× (suspension)	Report	3× (yellow card) 1× (suspension)	Large EWE Arena, Oldenburg; Attendance: 1,103; Referees: Lah, Sok (SLO)

5 December 2017; 17:45	Russia	24–16	Brazil	Large EWE Arena, Oldenburg; Attendance: 1,721; Referees: Horváth, Márton (HUN)
5 December 2017; 17:45	Samokhina 6	(14–7)	Amorim 5	Large EWE Arena, Oldenburg; Attendance: 1,721; Referees: Horváth, Márton (HUN)
5 December 2017; 17:45	2× (yellow card) 5× (suspension)	Report	4× (yellow card) 3× (suspension)	Large EWE Arena, Oldenburg; Attendance: 1,721; Referees: Horváth, Márton (HUN)

5 December 2017; 20:30	Denmark	37–19	Tunisia	Large EWE Arena, Oldenburg; Attendance: 1,812; Referees: Bonaventura, Bonaventura (FRA)
5 December 2017; 20:30	L. Jørgensen 6	(15–6)	Chebbah 7	Large EWE Arena, Oldenburg; Attendance: 1,812; Referees: Bonaventura, Bonaventura (FRA)
5 December 2017; 20:30	3× (yellow card) 4× (suspension)	Report	2× (yellow card) 2× (suspension)	Large EWE Arena, Oldenburg; Attendance: 1,812; Referees: Bonaventura, Bonaventura (FRA)

6 December 2017; 14:00	Russia	29–28	Japan	Large EWE Arena, Oldenburg; Attendance: 1,187; Referees: Bonaventura, Bonaventura (FRA)
6 December 2017; 14:00	three players 5	(13–11)	Ikehara, Y. Sunami 6	Large EWE Arena, Oldenburg; Attendance: 1,187; Referees: Bonaventura, Bonaventura (FRA)
6 December 2017; 14:00	2× (yellow card) 8× (suspension)	Report	2× (yellow card) 7× (suspension) 1× (red card)	Large EWE Arena, Oldenburg; Attendance: 1,187; Referees: Bonaventura, Bonaventura (FRA)

6 December 2017; 17:45	Tunisia	23–29	Montenegro	Large EWE Arena, Oldenburg; Attendance: 1,989; Referees: Antić, Jakovljević (SRB)
6 December 2017; 17:45	Chebbah, Kouki 5	(13–15)	Raičević 9	Large EWE Arena, Oldenburg; Attendance: 1,989; Referees: Antić, Jakovljević (SRB)
6 December 2017; 17:45	1× (yellow card) 4× (suspension)	Report	3× (yellow card) 5× (suspension) 1× (red card)	Large EWE Arena, Oldenburg; Attendance: 1,989; Referees: Antić, Jakovljević (SRB)

6 December 2017; 20:30	Brazil	20–22	Denmark	Large EWE Arena, Oldenburg; Attendance: 2,105; Referees: Horváth, Márton (HUN)
6 December 2017; 20:30	Belo 6	(13–13)	S. Jørgensen 9	Large EWE Arena, Oldenburg; Attendance: 2,105; Referees: Horváth, Márton (HUN)
6 December 2017; 20:30	4× (yellow card) 2× (suspension)	Report	4× (yellow card) 4× (suspension)	Large EWE Arena, Oldenburg; Attendance: 2,105; Referees: Horváth, Márton (HUN)

8 December 2017; 12:00	Japan	31–13	Tunisia	Large EWE Arena, Oldenburg; Attendance: 809; Referees: Horváth, Márton (HUN)
8 December 2017; 12:00	Yokoshima 8	(15–6)	Chebbah 5	Large EWE Arena, Oldenburg; Attendance: 809; Referees: Horváth, Márton (HUN)
8 December 2017; 12:00	2× (yellow card) 5× (suspension)	Report	2× (yellow card) 4× (suspension) 1× (red card)	Large EWE Arena, Oldenburg; Attendance: 809; Referees: Horváth, Márton (HUN)

8 December 2017; 17:45	Brazil	23–23	Montenegro	Large EWE Arena, Oldenburg; Attendance: 3,607; Referees: Arntsen, Røen (NOR)
8 December 2017; 17:45	Amorim, Belo 6	(13–12)	Bulatović 6	Large EWE Arena, Oldenburg; Attendance: 3,607; Referees: Arntsen, Røen (NOR)
8 December 2017; 17:45	3× (yellow card) 3× (suspension)	Report	3× (yellow card) 5× (suspension)	Large EWE Arena, Oldenburg; Attendance: 3,607; Referees: Arntsen, Røen (NOR)

8 December 2017; 20:30	Denmark	27–32	Russia	Large EWE Arena, Oldenburg; Attendance: 4,021; Referees: Lah, Sok (SLO)
8 December 2017; 20:30	Fisker, Woller 5	(11–12)	Samokhina 7	Large EWE Arena, Oldenburg; Attendance: 4,021; Referees: Lah, Sok (SLO)
8 December 2017; 20:30	2× (yellow card) 4× (suspension)	Report	2× (yellow card) 2× (suspension)	Large EWE Arena, Oldenburg; Attendance: 4,021; Referees: Lah, Sok (SLO)

=== Group D ===
Pos	Team	Pld	W	D	L	GF	GA	GD	Pts	Qualification
1	Serbia	5	3	2	0	159	121	+38	8	Round of 16
2	Netherlands	5	3	1	1	149	111	+38	7 (Note: Netherlands 31–23 Germany)	Round of 16
3	Germany (H)	5	3	1	1	120	95	+25	7	Round of 16
4	South Korea	5	3	0	2	134	118	+16	6	Round of 16
5	Cameroon	5	0	1	4	105	150	−45	1 (Note: China 26–26 Cameroon)	
6	China	5	0	1	4	92	164	−72	1	

Source: IHF
Rules for classification: 1) points; 2) head-to-head points; 3) head-to-head goal difference; 4) head-to-head number of goals scored; 5) Goal difference.
(H) Hosts
Notes:

1 December 2017; 19:00	Germany	28–15	Cameroon	Arena Leipzig, Leipzig; Attendance: 6,000; Referees: Arntsen, Røen (NOR)
1 December 2017; 19:00	Loerper 5	(12–7)	Djiepmou 3	Arena Leipzig, Leipzig; Attendance: 6,000; Referees: Arntsen, Røen (NOR)
1 December 2017; 19:00	3× (yellow card) 1× (suspension)	Report	2× (yellow card) 8× (suspension) 1× (red card)	Arena Leipzig, Leipzig; Attendance: 6,000; Referees: Arntsen, Røen (NOR)

2 December 2017; 15:30	Serbia	43–23	China	Arena Leipzig, Leipzig; Referees: Erdoğan, Özdeniz (TUR)
2 December 2017; 15:30	Damnjanović, Krpež Slezak 8	(21–11)	Liu 9	Arena Leipzig, Leipzig; Referees: Erdoğan, Özdeniz (TUR)
2 December 2017; 15:30	3× (yellow card) 4× (suspension)	Report	3× (yellow card) 4× (suspension) 1× (red card)	Arena Leipzig, Leipzig; Referees: Erdoğan, Özdeniz (TUR)

2 December 2017; 18:00	Netherlands	22–24	South Korea	Arena Leipzig, Leipzig; Attendance: 2,066; Referees: García, Marín (ESP)
2 December 2017; 18:00	Abbingh 11	(11–14)	Kang 6	Arena Leipzig, Leipzig; Attendance: 2,066; Referees: García, Marín (ESP)
2 December 2017; 18:00	2× (yellow card) 3× (suspension)	Report	1× (yellow card) 1× (suspension)	Arena Leipzig, Leipzig; Attendance: 2,066; Referees: García, Marín (ESP)

3 December 2017; 14:00	Cameroon	21–34	Serbia	Arena Leipzig, Leipzig; Attendance: 2,107; Referees: García, Marín (ESP)
3 December 2017; 14:00	Atangana, Touba 5	(9–20)	Krpež Slezak, Radosavljević 6	Arena Leipzig, Leipzig; Attendance: 2,107; Referees: García, Marín (ESP)
3 December 2017; 14:00	1× (yellow card) 5× (suspension)	Report	2× (yellow card) 3× (suspension)	Arena Leipzig, Leipzig; Attendance: 2,107; Referees: García, Marín (ESP)

3 December 2017; 18:00	China	15–40	Netherlands	Arena Leipzig, Leipzig; Attendance: 4,381; Referees: Arntsen, Røen (NOR)
3 December 2017; 18:00	Liu 6	(9–20)	three players 5	Arena Leipzig, Leipzig; Attendance: 4,381; Referees: Arntsen, Røen (NOR)
3 December 2017; 18:00	2× (yellow card) 2× (suspension)	Report	3× (yellow card) 2× (suspension)	Arena Leipzig, Leipzig; Attendance: 4,381; Referees: Arntsen, Røen (NOR)

3 December 2017; 20:30	South Korea	18–23	Germany	Arena Leipzig, Leipzig; Attendance: 5,794; Referees: Kurtagic, Wetterwik (SWE)
3 December 2017; 20:30	Lee, Sim 5	(10–11)	Gubernatis 7	Arena Leipzig, Leipzig; Attendance: 5,794; Referees: Kurtagic, Wetterwik (SWE)
3 December 2017; 20:30	3× (yellow card) 3× (suspension)	Report	4× (yellow card) 5× (suspension)	Arena Leipzig, Leipzig; Attendance: 5,794; Referees: Kurtagic, Wetterwik (SWE)

5 December 2017; 12:00	South Korea	31–19	China	Arena Leipzig, Leipzig; Attendance: 3,917; Referees: García, Marín (ESP)
5 December 2017; 12:00	Yu 8	(18–10)	Liu 8	Arena Leipzig, Leipzig; Attendance: 3,917; Referees: García, Marín (ESP)
5 December 2017; 12:00	2× (yellow card) 2× (suspension)	Report	2× (yellow card) 3× (suspension)	Arena Leipzig, Leipzig; Attendance: 3,917; Referees: García, Marín (ESP)

5 December 2017; 15:30	Netherlands	29–22	Cameroon	Arena Leipzig, Leipzig; Attendance: 2,237; Referees: Erdoğan, Özdeniz (TUR)
5 December 2017; 15:30	Polman, Van der Heijden 4	(14–8)	Djiepmou, Touba 4	Arena Leipzig, Leipzig; Attendance: 2,237; Referees: Erdoğan, Özdeniz (TUR)
5 December 2017; 15:30	3× (yellow card) 3× (suspension)	Report	1× (yellow card) 5× (suspension) 1× (red card)	Arena Leipzig, Leipzig; Attendance: 2,237; Referees: Erdoğan, Özdeniz (TUR)

5 December 2017; 18:00	Germany	22–22	Serbia	Arena Leipzig, Leipzig; Attendance: 3,871; Referees: Arntsen, Røen (NOR)
5 December 2017; 18:00	Huber 6	(9–11)	Krpež Slezak 7	Arena Leipzig, Leipzig; Attendance: 3,871; Referees: Arntsen, Røen (NOR)
5 December 2017; 18:00	4× (yellow card) 6× (suspension)	Report	4× (yellow card) 4× (suspension)	Arena Leipzig, Leipzig; Attendance: 3,871; Referees: Arntsen, Røen (NOR)

6 December 2017; 12:00	Cameroon	21–33	South Korea	Arena Leipzig, Leipzig; Attendance: 667; Referees: Arntsen, Røen (NOR)
6 December 2017; 12:00	Djiepmou 6	(6–16)	three players 5	Arena Leipzig, Leipzig; Attendance: 667; Referees: Arntsen, Røen (NOR)
6 December 2017; 12:00	3× (yellow card) 6× (suspension) 1× (red card)	Report	2× (yellow card) 2× (suspension)	Arena Leipzig, Leipzig; Attendance: 667; Referees: Arntsen, Røen (NOR)

6 December 2017; 15:30	Serbia	27–27	Netherlands	Arena Leipzig, Leipzig; Attendance: 2,545; Referees: Kurtagic, Wetterwik (SWE)
6 December 2017; 15:30	Dmitrović 9	(15–15)	Abbingh 7	Arena Leipzig, Leipzig; Attendance: 2,545; Referees: Kurtagic, Wetterwik (SWE)
6 December 2017; 15:30	3× (yellow card) 6× (suspension)	Report	3× (yellow card) 3× (suspension)	Arena Leipzig, Leipzig; Attendance: 2,545; Referees: Kurtagic, Wetterwik (SWE)

6 December 2017; 18:00	Germany	24–9	China	Arena Leipzig, Leipzig; Attendance: 3,165; Referees: Erdoğan, Özdeniz (TUR)
6 December 2017; 18:00	Bölk 4	(10–3)	three players 2	Arena Leipzig, Leipzig; Attendance: 3,165; Referees: Erdoğan, Özdeniz (TUR)
6 December 2017; 18:00	3× (yellow card) 1× (suspension)	Report	2× (yellow card) 4× (suspension)	Arena Leipzig, Leipzig; Attendance: 3,165; Referees: Erdoğan, Özdeniz (TUR)

8 December 2017; 14:00	China	26–26	Cameroon	Arena Leipzig, Leipzig; Attendance: 1,825; Referees: Antić, Jakovljević (SRB)
8 December 2017; 14:00	Qiao 5	(13–13)	Baniomo, Nchouapouognigni 5	Arena Leipzig, Leipzig; Attendance: 1,825; Referees: Antić, Jakovljević (SRB)
8 December 2017; 14:00	3× (yellow card) 3× (suspension)	Report	2× (yellow card) 5× (suspension)	Arena Leipzig, Leipzig; Attendance: 1,825; Referees: Antić, Jakovljević (SRB)

8 December 2017; 18:00	Netherlands	31–23	Germany	Arena Leipzig, Leipzig; Attendance: 6,000; Referees: García, Marín (ESP)
8 December 2017; 18:00	Abbingh 9	(18–10)	Stolle 6	Arena Leipzig, Leipzig; Attendance: 6,000; Referees: García, Marín (ESP)
8 December 2017; 18:00	1× (yellow card) 3× (suspension)	Report	3× (yellow card) 3× (suspension)	Arena Leipzig, Leipzig; Attendance: 6,000; Referees: García, Marín (ESP)

8 December 2017; 20:30	Serbia	33–28	South Korea	Arena Leipzig, Leipzig; Attendance: 5,432; Referees: Erdoğan, Özdeniz (TUR)
8 December 2017; 20:30	Damnjanović, Pop-Lazić 5	(15–14)	Yu 8	Arena Leipzig, Leipzig; Attendance: 5,432; Referees: Erdoğan, Özdeniz (TUR)
8 December 2017; 20:30	3× (yellow card) 4× (suspension)	Report	2× (yellow card) 2× (suspension)	Arena Leipzig, Leipzig; Attendance: 5,432; Referees: Erdoğan, Özdeniz (TUR)

== President's Cup ==
17th place bracket

17th–20th place semifinals
10 December
Angola	33
Poland (Pen.)	34
10 December
Brazil	28
Cameroon	26

17th place
11 December
Poland	29
Brazil	27
19th place
11 December
Angola	33
Cameroon	23

21st place bracket

21st–24th place semifinals
10 December
Paraguay	28
Argentina	25
10 December
Tunisia	31
China	32

21st place
11 December
Paraguay	23
China	21
23rd place
11 December
Argentina	29
Tunisia	19

=== 21st–24th place semifinals ===
10 December 2017; 11:30	Paraguay	28–25	Argentina	GETEC Arena, Magdeburg; Attendance: 1,493; Referees: Arntsen, Røen (NOR)
10 December 2017; 11:30	Fiore 8	(10–12)	Ponce de Leon, Salvadó 5	GETEC Arena, Magdeburg; Attendance: 1,493; Referees: Arntsen, Røen (NOR)
10 December 2017; 11:30	1× (yellow card) 3× (suspension)	Report	3× (yellow card) 3× (suspension)	GETEC Arena, Magdeburg; Attendance: 1,493; Referees: Arntsen, Røen (NOR)

10 December 2017; 14:00	Tunisia	31–32	China	GETEC Arena, Magdeburg; Attendance: 1,787; Referees: Bonaventura, Bonaventura (FRA)
10 December 2017; 14:00	Hamrouni 6	(14–16)	Liu 9	GETEC Arena, Magdeburg; Attendance: 1,787; Referees: Bonaventura, Bonaventura (FRA)
10 December 2017; 14:00	3× (yellow card) 2× (suspension)	Report	2× (yellow card) 5× (suspension)	GETEC Arena, Magdeburg; Attendance: 1,787; Referees: Bonaventura, Bonaventura (FRA)

=== 17th–20th place semifinals ===
10 December 2017
11:30
Angola
33–34
Poland
Arena Leipzig, Leipzig
Attendance: 763
Referees: Erdoğan, Özdeniz (TUR)
Guialo 9
(13–12)
Grzyb 13
2× (yellow card) 5× (suspension) 1× (red card)
Report
3× (yellow card) 3× (suspension)

FT: 24–24 Pen: 9–10

10 December 2017; 14:00	Brazil	28–26	Cameroon	Arena Leipzig, Leipzig; Attendance: 637; Referees: Alpaidze, Berezkina (RUS)
10 December 2017; 14:00	D. Rocha 7	(14–15)	Mossy, Touba 6	Arena Leipzig, Leipzig; Attendance: 637; Referees: Alpaidze, Berezkina (RUS)
10 December 2017; 14:00	2× (yellow card) 4× (suspension)	Report	1× (yellow card) 7× (suspension)	Arena Leipzig, Leipzig; Attendance: 637; Referees: Alpaidze, Berezkina (RUS)

=== 23rd place game ===
11 December 2017; 11:30	Argentina	29–19	Tunisia	GETEC Arena, Magdeburg; Attendance: 1,361; Referees: García, Marín (ESP)
11 December 2017; 11:30	Salvadó 8	(15–10)	Chabchoub 5	GETEC Arena, Magdeburg; Attendance: 1,361; Referees: García, Marín (ESP)
11 December 2017; 11:30	1× (yellow card) 1× (suspension)	Report	1× (yellow card) 3× (suspension)	GETEC Arena, Magdeburg; Attendance: 1,361; Referees: García, Marín (ESP)

=== 21st place game ===
11 December 2017; 14:00	Paraguay	23–21	China	GETEC Arena, Magdeburg; Attendance: 1,361; Referees: Kurtagic, Wetterwik (SWE)
11 December 2017; 14:00	Fiore 5	(14–10)	Sun 6	GETEC Arena, Magdeburg; Attendance: 1,361; Referees: Kurtagic, Wetterwik (SWE)
11 December 2017; 14:00	1× (yellow card) 6× (suspension)	Report	4× (suspension)	GETEC Arena, Magdeburg; Attendance: 1,361; Referees: Kurtagic, Wetterwik (SWE)

=== 19th place game ===
11 December 2017; 11:30	Angola	33–23	Cameroon	Arena Leipzig, Leipzig; Attendance: 227; Referees: Koo, Lee (KOR)
11 December 2017; 11:30	Machado 8	(16–12)	three players 4	Arena Leipzig, Leipzig; Attendance: 227; Referees: Koo, Lee (KOR)
11 December 2017; 11:30	3× (yellow card) 2× (suspension)	Report	1× (yellow card) 3× (suspension)	Arena Leipzig, Leipzig; Attendance: 227; Referees: Koo, Lee (KOR)

=== 17th place game ===
11 December 2017; 14:00	Poland	29–27	Brazil	Arena Leipzig, Leipzig; Attendance: 242; Referees: Hizaki, Ikebuchi (JPN)
11 December 2017; 14:00	Kudłacz-Gloc 7	(15–13)	M. Costa 8	Arena Leipzig, Leipzig; Attendance: 242; Referees: Hizaki, Ikebuchi (JPN)
11 December 2017; 14:00	3× (yellow card) 6× (suspension) 1× (red card)	Report	2× (yellow card) 5× (suspension) 1× (red card)	Arena Leipzig, Leipzig; Attendance: 242; Referees: Hizaki, Ikebuchi (JPN)

== Knockout stage ==
=== Bracket ===
Round of 16
10 December
Sweden	33
Slovenia	21
10 December
Germany	17
Denmark	21
10 December
Hungary	26
France	29
10 December
Serbia	29
Montenegro	31
11 December
Japan	24
Netherlands (ET)	26
11 December
Romania	27
Czech Republic	28
11 December
Spain	23
Norway	31
11 December
Russia (ET)	36
South Korea	35

Quarterfinals
12 December
Sweden	26
Denmark	23
12 December
France	25
Montenegro	22
13 December
Netherlands	30
Czech Republic	26
13 December
Norway	34
Russia	17

Semifinals
15 December
Sweden	22
France	24
15 December
Netherlands	23
Norway	32

Final
17 December
France	23
Norway	21
Third place
17 December
Sweden	21
Netherlands	24

=== Round of 16 ===
10 December 2017; 17:30	Serbia	29–31	Montenegro	GETEC Arena, Magdeburg; Attendance: 3,011; Referees: García, Marín (ESP)
10 December 2017; 17:30	Cvijić 7	(9–14)	Radičević 9	GETEC Arena, Magdeburg; Attendance: 3,011; Referees: García, Marín (ESP)
10 December 2017; 17:30	1× (yellow card) 5× (suspension)	Report	3× (yellow card) 6× (suspension)	GETEC Arena, Magdeburg; Attendance: 3,011; Referees: García, Marín (ESP)

10 December 2017; 17:30	Hungary	26–29	France	Arena Leipzig, Leipzig; Attendance: 1,385; Referees: Pavićević, Ražnatović (MNE)
10 December 2017; 17:30	Kovacsics, Lukács 6	(11–14)	Lacrabère 5	Arena Leipzig, Leipzig; Attendance: 1,385; Referees: Pavićević, Ražnatović (MNE)
10 December 2017; 17:30	3× (yellow card) 5× (suspension)	Report	1× (yellow card) 4× (suspension)	Arena Leipzig, Leipzig; Attendance: 1,385; Referees: Pavićević, Ražnatović (MNE)

10 December 2017; 20:30	Germany	17–21	Denmark	GETEC Arena, Magdeburg; Attendance: 4,133; Referees: Kurtagic, Wetterwik (SWE)
10 December 2017; 20:30	Smits 6	(7–11)	S. Jørgensen, Tranborg 5	GETEC Arena, Magdeburg; Attendance: 4,133; Referees: Kurtagic, Wetterwik (SWE)
10 December 2017; 20:30	3× (yellow card) 3× (suspension)	Report	2× (yellow card) 6× (suspension) 1× (red card)	GETEC Arena, Magdeburg; Attendance: 4,133; Referees: Kurtagic, Wetterwik (SWE)

10 December 2017; 20:30	Sweden	33–21	Slovenia	Arena Leipzig, Leipzig; Attendance: 1,190; Referees: Grillo, Lenci (ARG)
10 December 2017; 20:30	Westberg 8	(18–12)	Koren 8	Arena Leipzig, Leipzig; Attendance: 1,190; Referees: Grillo, Lenci (ARG)
10 December 2017; 20:30	3× (yellow card) 3× (suspension)	Report	2× (yellow card) 4× (suspension)	Arena Leipzig, Leipzig; Attendance: 1,190; Referees: Grillo, Lenci (ARG)

11 December 2017
17:30
Russia
36–35 (ET)
South Korea
GETEC Arena, Magdeburg
Attendance: 1,132
Referees: Arntsen, Røen (NOR)
Vedekhina 9
(16–13)
Lee 11
3× (yellow card) 4× (suspension) 1× (red card)
Report
1× (yellow card) 1× (suspension)

FT: 30–30 ET: 6–5

11 December 2017; 17:30	Romania	27–28	Czech Republic	Arena Leipzig, Leipzig; Attendance: 1,003; Referees: Schulze, Tönnies (GER)
11 December 2017; 17:30	Neagu 13	(17–14)	Jeřábková 7	Arena Leipzig, Leipzig; Attendance: 1,003; Referees: Schulze, Tönnies (GER)
11 December 2017; 17:30	4× (yellow card) 10× (suspension)	Report	4× (yellow card) 3× (suspension)	Arena Leipzig, Leipzig; Attendance: 1,003; Referees: Schulze, Tönnies (GER)

11 December 2017
20:30
Japan
24–26 (ET)
Netherlands
GETEC Arena, Magdeburg
Attendance: 1,231
Referees: Krichen, Makhlouf (TUN)
Ikehara 5
(10–10)
Malestein 7
2× (yellow card) 4× (suspension)
Report
3× (yellow card) 3× (suspension)

FT: 20–20 ET: 4–6

11 December 2017; 20:30	Spain	23–31	Norway	Arena Leipzig, Leipzig; Attendance: 1,263; Referees: Christiansen, Hansen (DEN)
11 December 2017; 20:30	Martín 6	(10–13)	Mørk 11	Arena Leipzig, Leipzig; Attendance: 1,263; Referees: Christiansen, Hansen (DEN)
11 December 2017; 20:30	1× (yellow card) 4× (suspension)	Report	1× (yellow card) 5× (suspension)	Arena Leipzig, Leipzig; Attendance: 1,263; Referees: Christiansen, Hansen (DEN)

=== Quarterfinals ===
12 December 2017; 17:30	Sweden	26–23	Denmark	Arena Leipzig, Leipzig; Attendance: 2,387; Referees: Alpaidze, Berezkina (RUS)
12 December 2017; 17:30	Blomstrand 7	(13–11)	Tranborg 7	Arena Leipzig, Leipzig; Attendance: 2,387; Referees: Alpaidze, Berezkina (RUS)
12 December 2017; 17:30	2× (yellow card) 2× (suspension)	Report	2× (yellow card) 4× (suspension)	Arena Leipzig, Leipzig; Attendance: 2,387; Referees: Alpaidze, Berezkina (RUS)

12 December 2017; 20:45	France	25–22	Montenegro	Arena Leipzig, Leipzig; Attendance: 2,019; Referees: Koo, Lee (KOR)
12 December 2017; 20:45	Pineau 5	(12–10)	Bulatović 9	Arena Leipzig, Leipzig; Attendance: 2,019; Referees: Koo, Lee (KOR)
12 December 2017; 20:45	4× (yellow card) 3× (suspension)	Report	3× (yellow card) 3× (suspension)	Arena Leipzig, Leipzig; Attendance: 2,019; Referees: Koo, Lee (KOR)

13 December 2017; 17:30	Netherlands	30–26	Czech Republic	GETEC Arena, Magdeburg; Attendance: 1,451; Referees: Horváth, Márton (HUN)
13 December 2017; 17:30	Abbingh 14	(17–16)	Luzumová 11	GETEC Arena, Magdeburg; Attendance: 1,451; Referees: Horváth, Márton (HUN)
13 December 2017; 17:30	3× (yellow card) 4× (suspension)	Report	3× (yellow card) 5× (suspension)	GETEC Arena, Magdeburg; Attendance: 1,451; Referees: Horváth, Márton (HUN)

13 December 2017; 20:30	Norway	34–17	Russia	GETEC Arena, Magdeburg; Attendance: 1,583; Referees: Bonaventura, Bonaventura (FRA)
13 December 2017; 20:30	Mørk 9	(15–8)	Kochetova 5	GETEC Arena, Magdeburg; Attendance: 1,583; Referees: Bonaventura, Bonaventura (FRA)
13 December 2017; 20:30	2× (yellow card)	Report	1× (yellow card) 4× (suspension)	GETEC Arena, Magdeburg; Attendance: 1,583; Referees: Bonaventura, Bonaventura (FRA)

=== Semifinals ===
15 December 2017; 17:30	Netherlands	23–32	Norway	Barclaycard Arena, Hamburg; Attendance: 11,261; Referees: Kurtagic, Wetterwik (SWE)
15 December 2017; 17:30	Van Der Heijden 5	(10–17)	Mørk 8	Barclaycard Arena, Hamburg; Attendance: 11,261; Referees: Kurtagic, Wetterwik (SWE)
15 December 2017; 17:30	1× (yellow card) 2× (suspension)	Report	3× (yellow card) 5× (suspension)	Barclaycard Arena, Hamburg; Attendance: 11,261; Referees: Kurtagic, Wetterwik (SWE)

15 December 2017; 20:45	Sweden	22–24	France	Barclaycard Arena, Hamburg; Attendance: 11,261; Referees: García, Marín (ESP)
15 December 2017; 20:45	Hagman 8	(12–11)	Lacrabère 5	Barclaycard Arena, Hamburg; Attendance: 11,261; Referees: García, Marín (ESP)
15 December 2017; 20:45	3× (yellow card) 3× (suspension)	Report	2× (yellow card) 7× (suspension)	Barclaycard Arena, Hamburg; Attendance: 11,261; Referees: García, Marín (ESP)

=== Third place game ===
17 December 2017; 14:30	Sweden	21–24	Netherlands	Barclaycard Arena, Hamburg; Attendance: 11,162; Referees: Alpaidze, Berezkina (RUS)
17 December 2017; 14:30	Gulldén 7	(8–14)	Abbingh 8	Barclaycard Arena, Hamburg; Attendance: 11,162; Referees: Alpaidze, Berezkina (RUS)
17 December 2017; 14:30	1× (yellow card) 3× (suspension)	Report	1× (yellow card) 6× (suspension) 1× (red card)	Barclaycard Arena, Hamburg; Attendance: 11,162; Referees: Alpaidze, Berezkina (RUS)

=== Final ===
17 December 2017; 17:30	France	23–21	Norway	Barclaycard Arena, Hamburg; Attendance: 11,261; Referees: Christiansen, Hansen (DEN)
17 December 2017; 17:30	Houette, Pineau 4	(11–10)	Kristiansen, Mørk 7	Barclaycard Arena, Hamburg; Attendance: 11,261; Referees: Christiansen, Hansen (DEN)
17 December 2017; 17:30	4× (yellow card) 4× (suspension)	Report	1× (suspension)	Barclaycard Arena, Hamburg; Attendance: 11,261; Referees: Christiansen, Hansen (DEN)

== Final ranking and statistics ==
=== Final ranking ===
Rank	Team
Gold medal	France
Silver medal	Norway
Bronze medal	Netherlands
4	Sweden
5	Russia
6	Denmark
6	Montenegro
8	Czech Republic
9	Serbia
10	Romania
11	Spain
12	Germany
13	South Korea
14	Slovenia
15	Hungary
16	Japan
17	Poland
18	Brazil
19	Angola
20	Cameroon
21	Paraguay
22	China
23	Argentina
24	Tunisia

2017 Women's World Champions

France
Second title

Team roster: Blandine Dancette, Camille Ayglon, Allison Pineau, Laurisa Landre, Astride N'Gouan, Grâce Zaadi, Amandine Leynaud, Manon Houette, Kalidiatou Niakaté, Cléopâtre Darleux, Siraba Dembélé, Laura Flippes, Orlane Kanor, Béatrice Edwige, Estelle Nze Minko, Gnonsiane Niombla, Alexandra Lacrabère.
Head coach: Olivier Krumbholz.

=== All Star Team ===
The All Star Team and MVP was announced on 17 December 2017.

Position	Player
Most valuable player	Stine Bredal Oftedal (NOR)
Goalkeeper	Katrine Lunde (NOR)
Right wing	Nathalie Hagman (SWE)
Right back	Nora Mørk (NOR)
Centre back	Grâce Zaadi (FRA)
Left back	Lois Abbingh (NED)
Left wing	Siraba Dembélé (FRA)
Pivot	Yvette Broch (NED)

=== Top goalscorers ===
Rank	Name	Team	Goals	Shots	%
1	Nora Mørk	Norway	66	97	68
2	Lois Abbingh	Netherlands	58	100	58
3	Iveta Luzumová	Czech Republic	47	73	64
4	Isabelle Gulldén	Sweden	46	74	62
5	Karolina Kudłacz-Gloc	Poland	44	70	63
5	Stine Bredal Oftedal	Norway	44	68	65
7	Sabrina Fiore	Paraguay	43	62	69
7	Ana Gros	Slovenia	43	67	64
7	Markéta Jeřábková	Czech Republic	43	101	43
10	Katarina Bulatović	Montenegro	42	85	49
10	Cristina Neagu	Romania	42	72	58
10	Jovanka Radičević	Montenegro	42	61	69

Source: IHF

=== Top goalkeepers ===
Rank	Name	Team	%	Saves	Shots
1	Katja Kramarczyk	Germany	42	30	71
1	Katrine Lunde	Norway	42	92	217
3	Yuliya Dumanska	Romania	40	39	98
4	Cléopâtre Darleux	France	39	41	106
4	Kinga Janurik	Hungary	39	27	70
6	Kari Aalvik Grimsbø	Norway	38	43	112
6	Park Sae-young	South Korea	38	43	113
8	Clara Woltering	Germany	37	43	115
9	Marija Čolić	Serbia	35	39	113
9	Victoriya Kalinina	Russia	35	38	108
9	Amandine Leynaud	France	35	65	186
9	Sandra Toft	Denmark	35	68	192

Source: IHF
