= Vanessa Djiepmou =

Cameroonian handball player

Personal information
- Full name: Vanessa Djiepmou Medibe
- Nationality: Cameroonian
- Born: 18 June 1990 (age 36)
- Height: 1.68 m (5 ft 6 in)

Sport
- Sport: Handball
- Position: Centre back
- Current club: FAP Yaoundé
National team
Years	Team	Apps
–	Cameroon	34

Vanessa Djiepmou Medibe (born 18 June 1990) is a Cameroonian handball player for FAP Yaoundé and the Cameroonian national team.

She participated at the 2017 World Women's Handball Championship.
