= Cléopatre Darleux =

French handball player (born 1989)

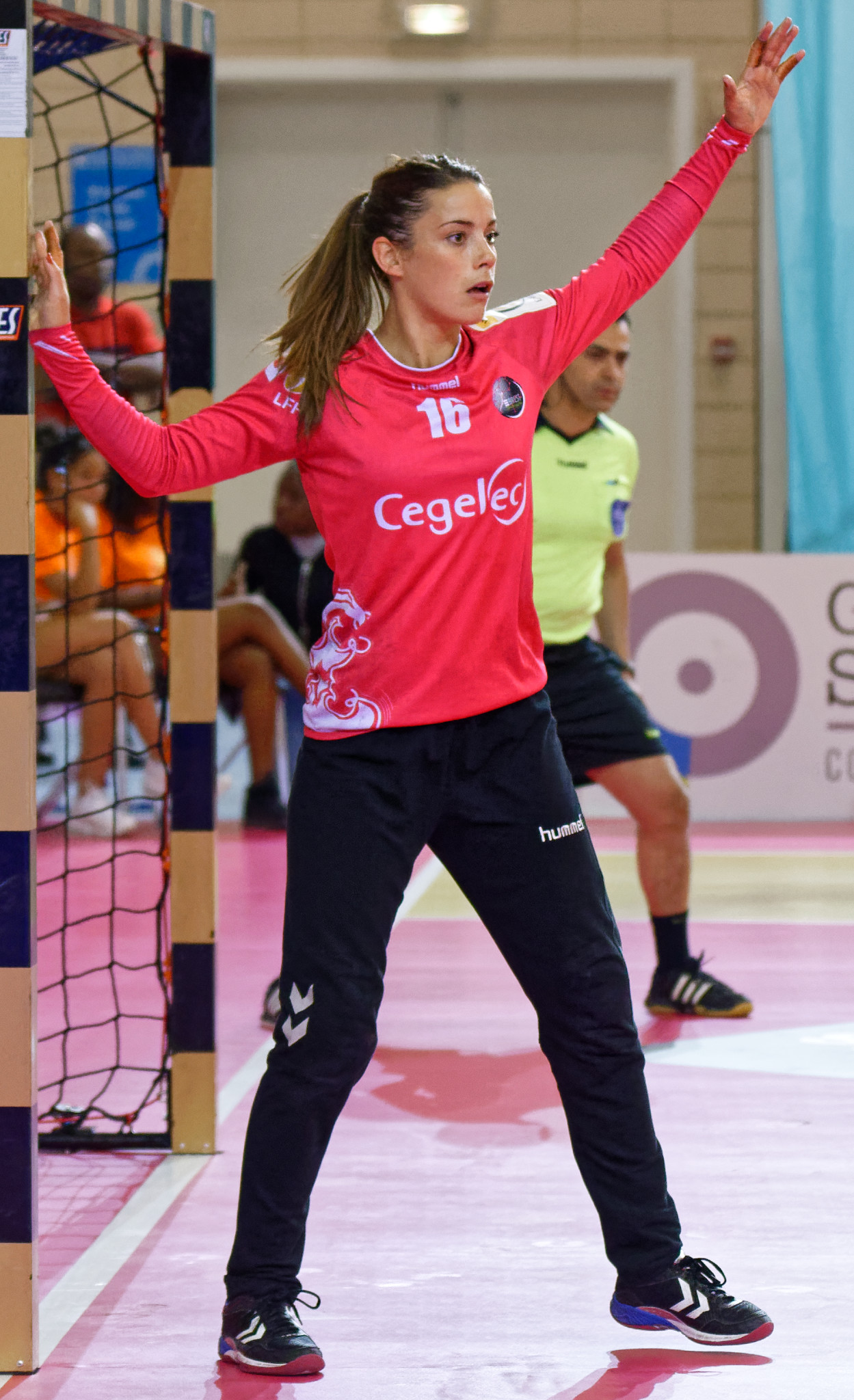
- Darleux in 2017

Personal information
- Full name: Cléopatre Darleux Mingam
- Nationality: French
- Born: 1 July 1989 (age 37) Wittenheim, France
- Height: 1.76 m (5 ft 9 in)

Sport
- Sport: Handball
- Position: Goalkeeper
- Current club: Metz Handball
- Number: 16

Senior clubs
- Years: Team
- 1997–2002: Wittenheim/Ensisheim
- 2003–2004: Kingersheim
- 2005–2006: ES Besançon
- 2007–2009: Issy les Moulineaux
- 2009–2011: Metz Handball
- 2011–2012: Arvor 29
- 2012–2014: Viborg HK
- 2014–2016: Nice Handball
- 2016–2024: Brest Bretagne Handball
- 2024–2025: Metz Handball
National team
Years	Team	Apps	(Gls)
2008–2024	France	204	(5)
Medal record
women's Handball
Representing (France) France
Olympic Games
Gold medal – first place	2020 Tokyo	Team
Silver medal – second place	2024 Paris	Team
World Championship
Second place	2021 Spain
First place	2017 Germany
Second place	2011 Brazil
Second place	2009 China
European Championship
Second place	2020 Denmark
Mediterranean Games
Gold medal – first place	2009 Pescara
- Updated on 12 November 2024

Cléopatre Darleux (French pronunciation: [kleɔpatʁ daʁlø]; born 1 July 1989) is a French former handball goalkeeper for the French national team.

She won the gold medal at the 2020 Summer Olympics and also became World Champion in 2017

== Career ==
=== Early career ===
Darleux started playing handball at US Wittenheim/Ensisheim followed by HBC Kingersheim. In 2005 she joined ES Besançon, where she became part of the first team. In 2007 she joined Issy les Moulineaux, where she signed her first professional contract. She played three seasons for the club. She then joined Metz Handball. Here she won the League Cup and French Cup in her first season, and French Championship and Cup in her second season.

=== Arvor 29 ===
In 2011 she joined Arvor 29. During preseason training, an abscess formed on the cornea of her right eye, which almost blinded her. Throughout her recovery she could not wear contact lenses and therefore played wearing sports glasses. In the 2011-12 season she won the French Championship and Cup.

=== Viborg HK ===
In 2012 she joined Danish side Viborg HK on a two year deal. Here she won the 2013-14 Danish Championship and Cup, as well as the EHF Cup Winners' Cup.

=== OGC Nice Handball ===
In 2014 she joined Nice Handball.

=== Brest Bretagne ===
In 2016 she joined Brest Bretagne Handball.

Between April 2019 and February 2020 she took a break from handball due to a maternity leave.

In 2021 she won the French Championship for a third time, and the same season she and the club reached the final of the Champions League, where they lost to Norwegian Vipers Kristiansand.

After the 2023-24 season she left Brest Bretagne.

=== Metz Handball ===
In September 2024 she signed for Metz Handball. After the 2024-25 season she retired.

=== National team ===
Darleux won the gold medal at the 2020 Summer Olympics, the first Olympic title in the history of France's national team. She also competed in the 2012 Summer Olympics, where France finished in fifth place.

Darleux also became World Champion in 2017 and won three silver medals, at the 2009, 2011 and 2021 World Women's Handball Championships. Runner-up at the 2020 European Championship, she was awarded Best Goalkeeper at the 2022 edition.

Her last tournament with France was the 2024 Olympics at home, where France won silver medals, losing to Norway in the final.

== Achievements ==
=== Club ===
International

- EHF Champions League
  - Finalist: 2021 (with Brest Bretagne Handball)
- EHF Cup Winners' Cup
  - Winner: 2014 (with Viborg HK)

Domestic

- French league:
  - Winner: 2011 (with Metz Handball), 2012 (with Arvor 29) and 2021 (with Brest Bretagne Handball)
  - Runner up: 2017, 2018 and 2022 (with Brest Bretagne Handball)
  - Tied 1st: 2020 (with Brest Bretagne Handball)
- French Cup (Coupe de France):
  - Winner: 2010 (with Metz Handball), 2018 and 2021 (with Brest Bretagne Handball)
- French Women's League Cup (Coupe de la Ligue):
  - Winner: 2010 and 2011 (with Metz Handball), 2012 (with Arvor 29)
  - Runner up: 2016 (with OGC Nice)
- Danish league (Damehåndboldligaen):
  - Winner: 2014 (with Viborg HK)
- Danish Cup:
  - Winner: 2013 (with Viborg HK)

=== National team ===
- Olympic Games
  - 2012: 5th
  - 2020: Gold
  - 2024: Silver
- World Championship:
  - 2009: Silver
  - 2011: Silver
  - 2013: 6th
  - 2017: Gold
  - 2021: Silver
- European Championship
  - 2008: 14th
  - 2010: 5th
  - 2012: 9th
  - 2020: Silver
  - 2022: 4th
- Other senior competitions
  - Gold at the Mediterranean Games in 2009
  - Bronze at the GF World Cup in 2008
  - Gold at the Tournoi de Paris Île-de-France in 2009, 2011, 2013 and 2017
- Junior competitions
  - Bronze at the European Women's U-17 Handball Championship in 2005
  - 4th at the IHF Women's Youth World Championship (U18) in 2006
  - 5th at the European Women's U-19 Handball Championship in 2007
  - 7th at the IHF Women's Junior World Championship (U20) in 2008

== Individual awards ==
- French Championship
  - MVP / Best player: 2018
  - Best Goalkeeper (2): 2012 and 2018
  - Player of the month (6): March 2016, October 2016, April 2017, March 2018, September 2018, January 2022
- European Championship
  - Best Goalkeeper: 2022
- Other:
  - 2nd biggest champion of the year selected by L'Équipe in 2021

== Honors ==
- Inducted into the Legion of Honor with the rank of Chevalier: 2021
