= Manon Houette =

French handball player (born 1992)

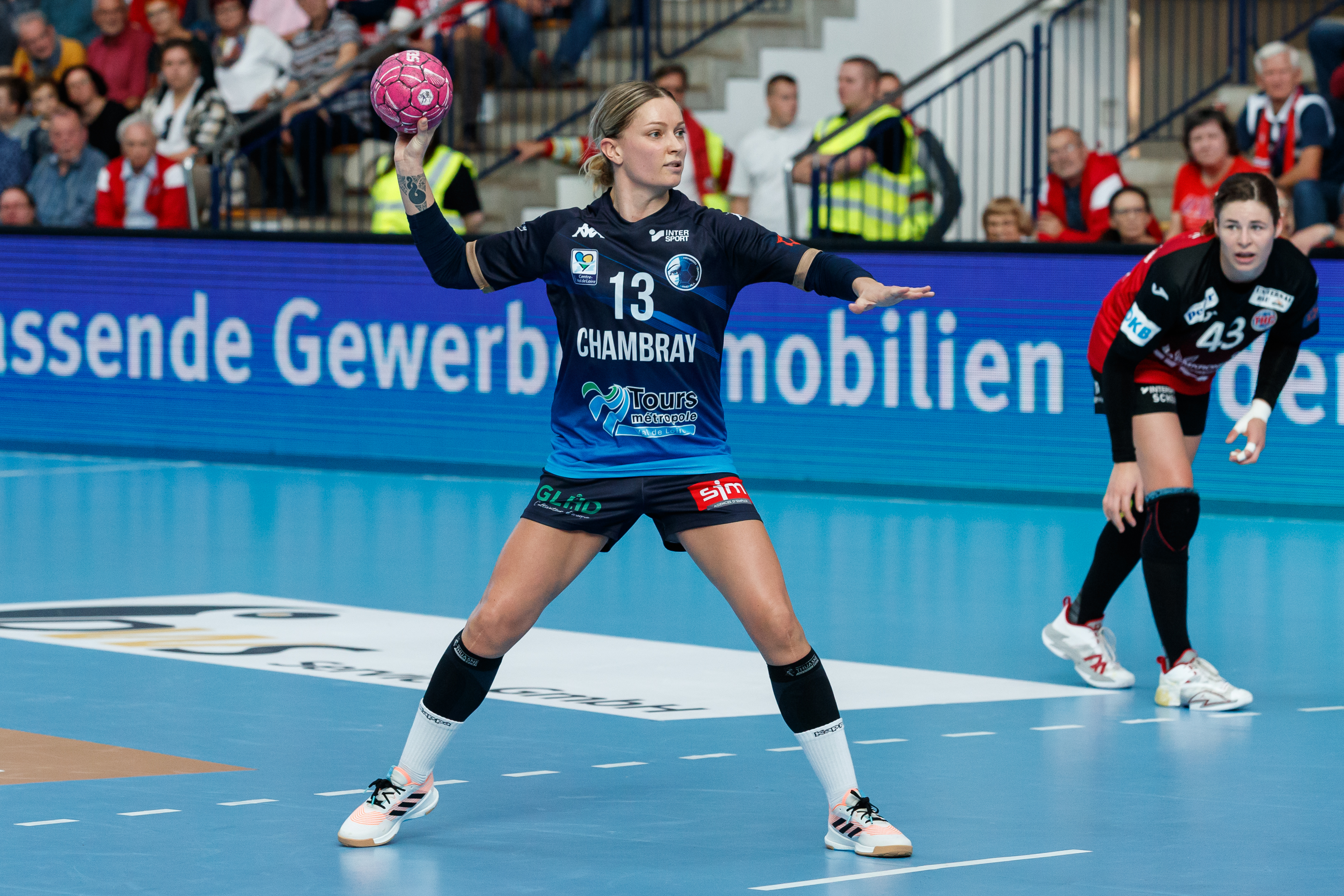
- Houette in 2022

Personal information
- Nationality: French
- Born: 2 July 1992 (age 34) Le Mans, France
- Height: 1.68 m (5 ft 6 in)

Sport
- Sport: Handball
- Position: Left wing
- Current club: Retired
- Number: 13

Youth career
- Years: Team
- –: HBC Pays de Sillé
- –: CSCM Le Mans

Senior clubs
- Years: Team
- 2010–2016: Fleury Loiret HB
- 2016–2017: Thüringer HC
- 2017–2021: Metz Handball
- 2021–2022: Bourg-de-Péage Drôme Handball
- 2022–2024: Chambray Touraine Handball
National team
Years	Team	Apps	(Gls)
2013–2024	France	104	(248)
Medal record
Olympic Games
Silver medal – second place	2016 Rio de Janeiro	Team
World Championship
Gold medal – first place	2017 Germany
European Championship
Gold medal – first place	2018 France
Bronze medal – third place	2016 Sweden

Manon Houette (born 2 July 1992) is a French handball player, who played for the French national team. She is a World Champions from 2017 and a European Champion from 2018.

== Club career ==
Houette started her career at HBC Pays de Sillé followed by CSCM Le Mans, before joining Fleury Loiret HB in 2010. Here shw won the French Championship and French League Cup in 2015, and the French Cup in 2014. She was named Best Left Winger in the French Division 1 league in 2013–14 and 2014–15 seasons.

In 2016 she joined German side Thüringer HC. A season later she returned to France to join Metz Handball. Here she won the French Championship in 2018 and 2019 and the French Cup in 2019. n 2020 she had a knee injury, and the club brought in Martine Smeets from Molde HK to replace her.

In 2022 she joined Bourg-de-Péage Drôme Handball. In 2022 she joined Chambray Touraine Handball. After the 2023-24 season she retired.

=== National team ===
Houette won silver medals at the 2012 Women's Junior World Handball Championship.

She made her debut for the French national team on 27 October 2013 against Finland.

She then competed at the 2015 World Women's Handball Championship

At the 2016 Olympics she won silver medals, losing to Russia in the final. Later the same year she won bronze medals at the 2016 European Championship.

A year later she won gold medals at the 2017 world Championship.

In 2018 she won another gold medal, when France won the 2018 European Championship. This was the first time, France won the European Championship.

== Titles ==
=== Club ===
- French Championship: 2015, 2018, 2019
- French Cup: 2014, 2019
- French League Cup: 2015

== Individual awards ==
- French Championship Best Left Wing: 2014, 2015, 2016, 2018
- French Championship Hope of the Season: 2013
- All-Star Left Wing of the EHF Champions League: 2019
