= Jacky Baniomo =

Cameroonian handball player

Personal information
- Nationality: Cameroonian
- Born: 16 April 1983 (age 43)
- Height: 1.72 m (5 ft 8 in)

Sport
- Sport: Handball
- Position: Centre back
- Current club: Usarsport
National team
Years	Team	Apps
–	Cameroon	35

Jacky Baniomo (born 16 April 1983) is a Cameroonian handball player for Usarsport and the Cameroonian national team.

She participated at the 2017 World Women's Handball Championship.
