= Yolande Touba =

Cameroonian handball player

Personal information
- Full name: Yolande Touba Byolo
- Nationality: Cameroonian
- Born: 18 July 1993 (age 33)
- Height: 1.62 m (5 ft 4 in)

Sport
- Sport: Handball
- Position: Right wing
- Current club: Dynamique De Bokito
National team
| Years | Team | Apps |
| – | Cameroon | 11 |
Medal record
African Championship
| Silver medal – second place | 2021 Yaoundé |
| Silver medal – second place | 2022 Dakar |

Yolande Touba Byolo (born 18 July 1993) is a Cameroonian handball player for Dynamique De Bokito and the Cameroonian national team.

She participated at the 2017 World Women's Handball Championship. At the 2021 and 2022 African Championship she won silver medals, losing to Angola in the final on both occasions.
