= EgeTrans Arena =

Multi-purpose arena in Bietigheim-Bissingen, Germany

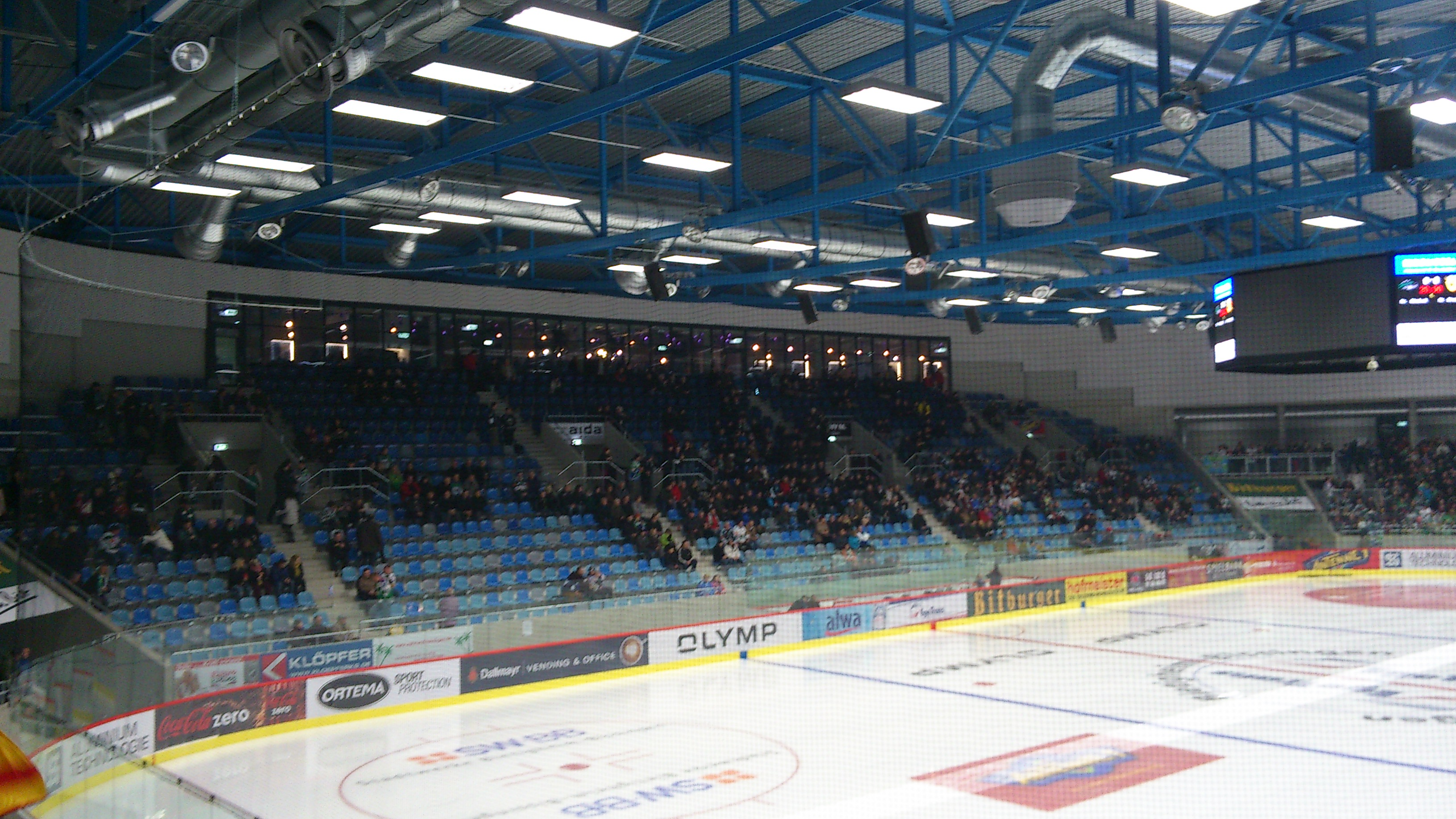
- Interactive map of EgeTrans Arena
- Location: Bietigheim-Bissingen, Germany
- Coordinates: 48°57′2.9″N 9°7′14.9″E
- Owner: Stadtwerke Bietigheim-Bissingen GmbH
- Operator: Stadtwerke Bietigheim-Bissingen GmbH
- Capacity: 4,517 (handball, ice hockey)

Construction
- Opened: 2012
- Cost: €18 million

Tenants
- SG BBM Bietigheim; SC Bietigheim Steelers

EgeTrans Arena is a multi-purpose arena in Bietigheim-Bissingen, Germany. It is the home arena of the handball team SG BBM Bietigheim and the professional ice hockey team SC Bietigheim Steelers.

== Events ==
- 2017 World Women's Handball Championship
