= Lisa Atangana =

Cameroonian handball player

Personal information
- Full name: Lisa Atangana Belibi
- Nationality: Cameroonian
- Born: 3 October 1997 (age 29)
- Height: 1.74 m (5 ft 9 in)

Sport
- Sport: Handball
- Position: Right back
- Current club: Anglet Biarritz
National team
| Years | Team | Apps | (Gls) |
| – | Cameroon | 7 | (11) |

Lisa Atangana Belibi (born 3 October 1997) is a Cameroonian handball player for Anglet Biarritz and the Cameroonian national team.

She participated at the 2017 World Women's Handball Championship.
