= Jacqueline Mossy =

Cameroonian handball player

Personal information
- Full name: Jacqueline Mossy Solle
- Nationality: Cameroonian
- Born: 29 July 1985 (age 41)
- Height: 1.72 m (5 ft 8 in)

Sport
- Sport: Handball
- Position: Pivot
- Current club: Dynamique De Bokito
National team
Years	Team	Apps
–	Cameroon	90

Jacqueline Mossy Solle (born 29 July 1985) is a Cameroonian handball player for Dynamique De Bokito and the Cameroonian national team.

She participated at the 2017 World Women's Handball Championship.
