= Trier Arena =

Indoor sporting arena in Trier, Germany

Coordinates: 49°46′18″N 6°39′50″E

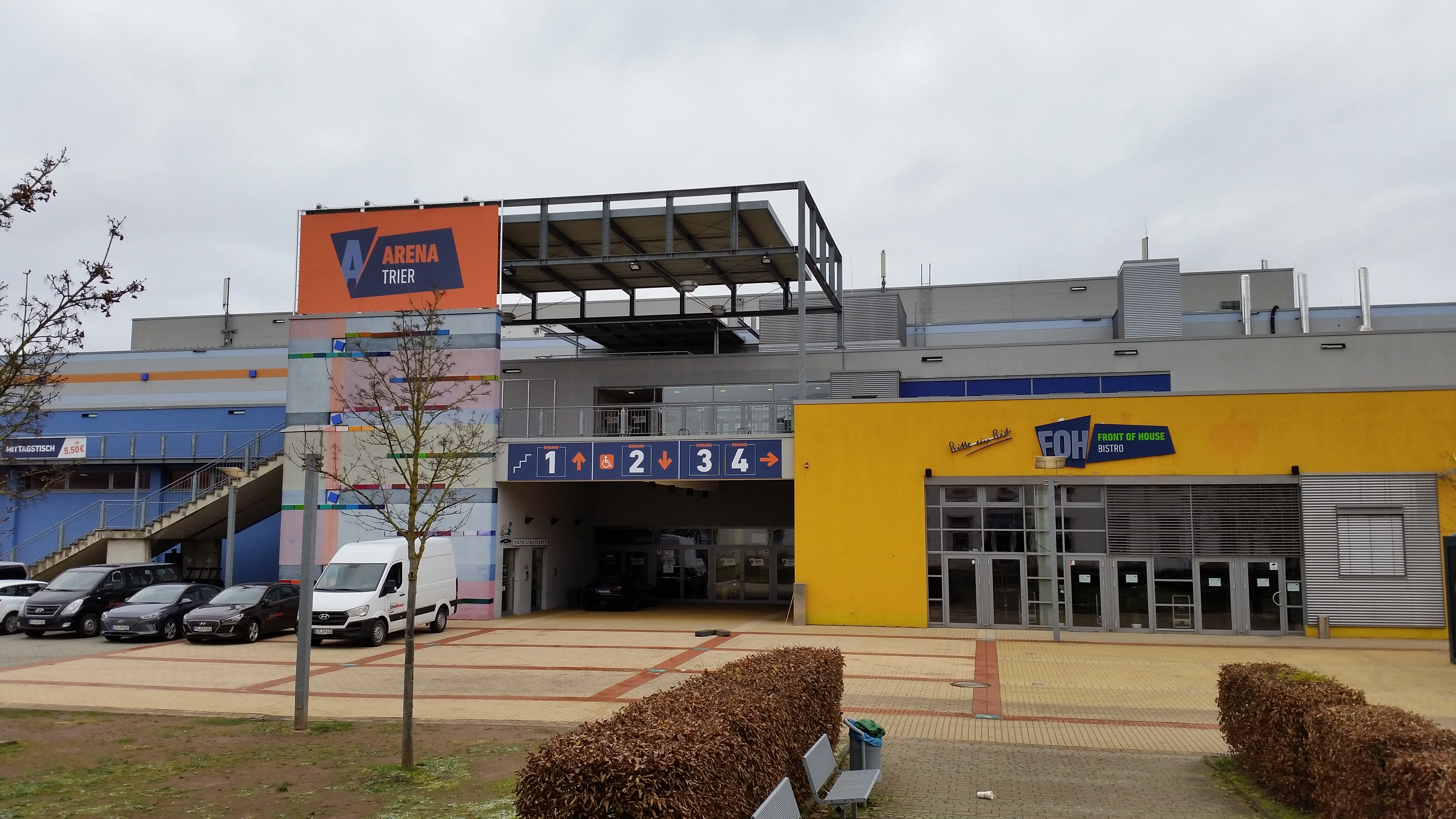
Trier Arena in December 2017

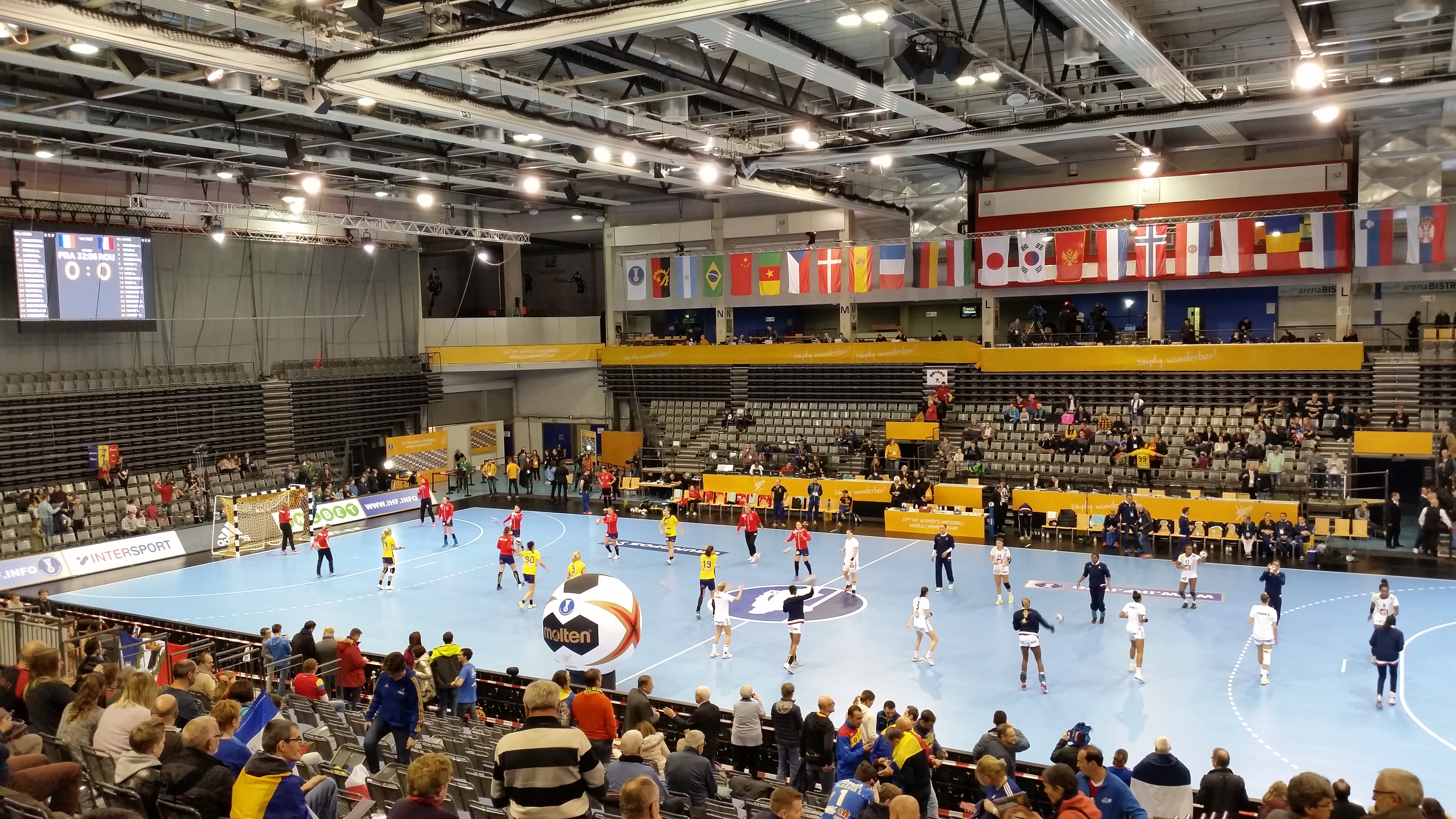
Inside Trier Arena in December 2017

Trier Arena is an indoor sporting arena located in Trier, Germany. The capacity of the arena is 5,495 people.

It is currently home to the TBB Trier basketball team.
