= Martina Goričanec =

Austrian handball player (born 1993)

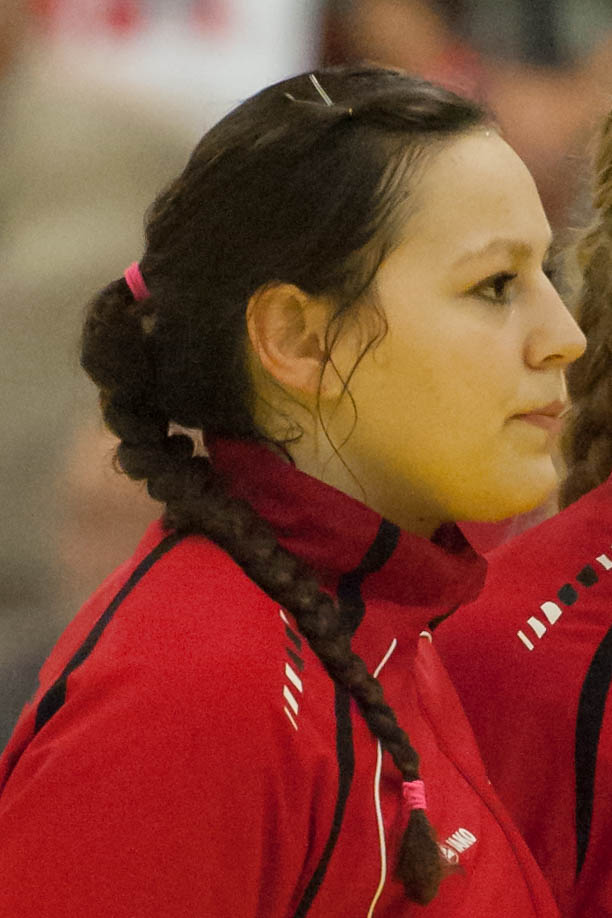

Personal information
- Nationality: Austrian
- Born: 19 September 1993 (age 33) Feldkirch, Austria
- Height: 1.80 m (5 ft 11 in)

Sport
- Sport: Handball
- Position: Left back
- Current club: Retired

Youth career
- Years: Team
- –: HC JCL BW Feldkirch

Senior clubs
- Years: Team
- 2010–2016: Hypo Niederösterreich
- 2016–2019: LC Brühl Handball
National team
Years	Team	Apps	(Gls)
2010-2019	Austria	65	(112)

Martina Goričanec (born 19 September 1993) is an Austrian former handball player of Croatian descent, who played for LC Brühl Handball, Hypo Niederösterreich and the Austria national team.

== Career ==
Goričanec started playing handball at her hometown club HC JCL BW Feldkirch. At the age of 14 she joined Hypo Niederösterreich. Here she won the 2013 EHF Cup Winners' Cup as well as several Austrian championships and cups.

In 2016 she joined Swiss team LC Brühl Handball. Here she won the 2017 and 2019 Swiss championship and the 2017 Swiss cup. She retired in 2019.

== International honours ==
- EHF Cup Winners' Cup:
  - Winner: 2013
  - Semifinalist: 2015
