= Kinga Achruk =

Polish handball player (born 1989)

Kinga Byzdra Achruk
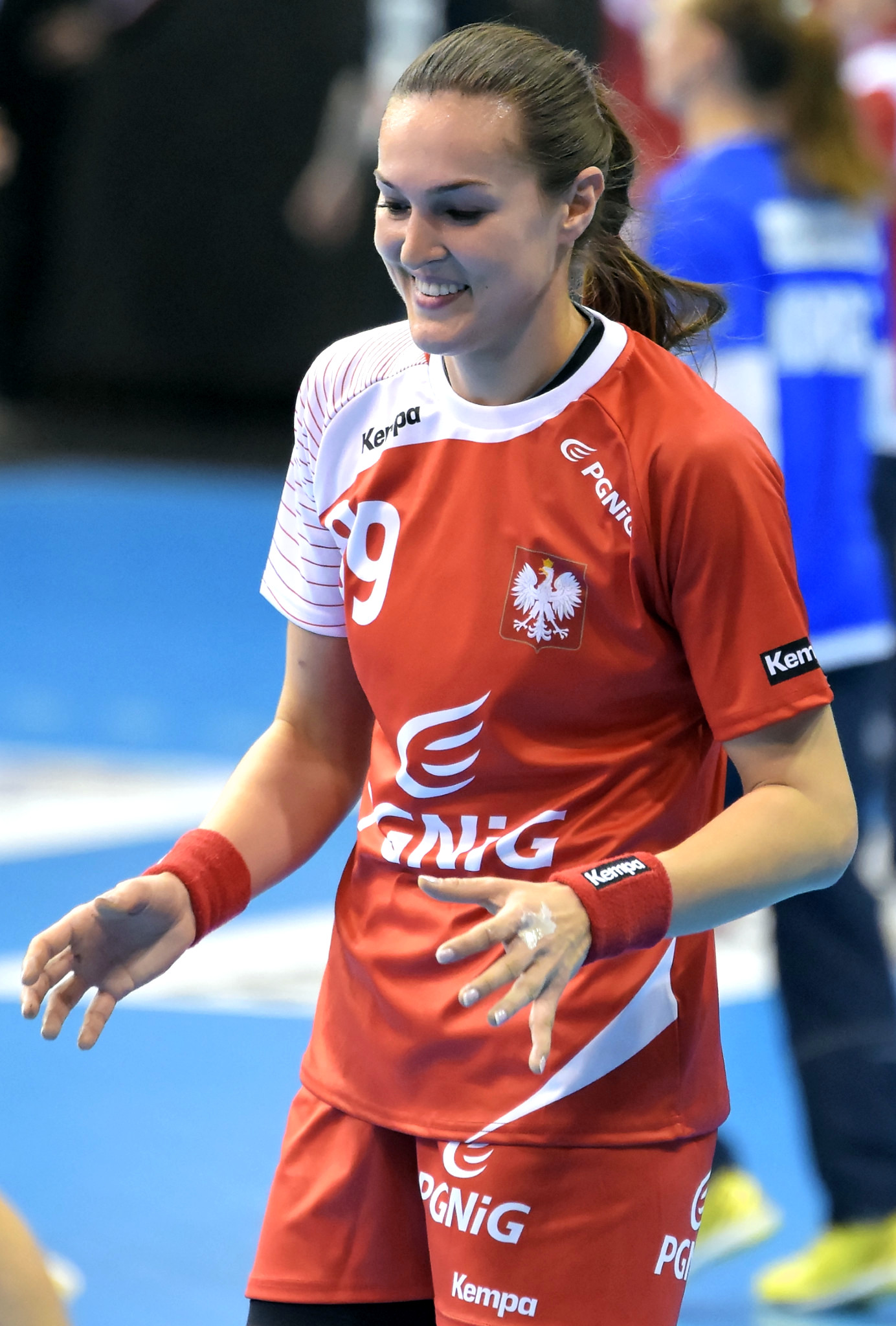

Personal information
- Nationality: Polish
- Born: 9 January 1989 (age 37) Puławy, Poland
- Height: 1.81 m (5 ft 11 in)

Sport
- Sport: Handball
- Position: Centre back
- Current club: Retired
- Number: 89

Senior clubs
- Years: Team
- 2008–2013: Zagłębie Lubin
- 2013–2017: ŽRK Budućnost Podgorica
- 2017–2024: MKS Lublin
National team
Years	Team	Apps	(Gls)
2006–2023	Poland	209	(569)

Kinga Achruk, née Byzdra (born 9 January 1989) is a retired Polish handball player.

She represented the Polish national team at the 2013 World Women's Handball Championship in Serbia and the 2015 World Women's Handball Championship in Denmark.

== Achievements ==
- EHF Champions League:
  - Winner: 2015
  - Finalist: 2014
- Carpathian Trophy:
  - Winner: 2017
