= Syrian Air Force =

Aerial warfare branch of Syria's armed forces

- القوات الجوية السورية
- Variation of the emblem of Syria used by the Syrian Armed Forces
- Founded: 1945; 81 years ago 2025 (current form)
- Country: Syria
- Type: Air force
- Role: Aerial warfare
- Size: 15,000 (as of 2021) troops
- Part of: Syrian Armed Forces
- Headquarters: Damascus
- Nicknames: Nosour Qasioun (Arabic: نُسُور قَاسِيُون, lit. 'Qasioun eagles')
- March: We are the Eagles (Arabic: نَحْنُ النُّسُورُ, romanized: Naḥn-un-Nusūr)
- Anniversaries: 16 October
- Equipment: Approx 450 aircraft in 2011 (before the Syrian Civil War); Approx 459 aircraft in 2024; Unknown as of 2026
- Engagements: 1948 Arab–Israeli War; Six-Day War; Yom Kippur War; Islamist uprising in Syria; Lebanese Civil War; 1982 Lebanon War; Syrian Civil War; Aftermath of the Syrian civil war

Commanders
- Commander-in-Chief: President Ahmed al-Sharaa
- Minister of Defence: Major General Murhaf Abu Qasra
- Commander of the Air Force: Brigadier General Asim Hawari
- Chief of Air Staff: Brigadier General Mustafa Bakour
- Deputy Chief of Air Staff: Brigadier General Hassan Hamada
- Notable commanders: Hafez al-Assad; Muhammad al-Khuli; Issam Hallaq

Insignia
- Ensign

- Roundel

- Fin flash

The Syrian Air Force (SyAF, Arabic: القوات الجوية السورية, romanized: al-Quwwāt al-Jawwīyah al-Sūrīyah) is the air force branch of the Syrian Armed Forces. It was established in 1948, and first saw action in the 1948 Arab–Israeli War. Under Ba'athist Syria until 8 December 2024, it was known as the Syrian Arab Air Force (SyAAF). Also, until December 2024, land-based air defense systems were grouped under the Syrian Air Defence Force, which was separate from both the Air Force and the Army.

Following the fall of the Assad regime in December 2024 led by Hay'at Tahrir al-Sham (HTS) and other rebel groups, and Israeli airstrikes in December 2024 aimed at the former regime combat aircraft, the new government and defense ministry began reconstituting a smaller air force.

== History ==
=== 1940s ===
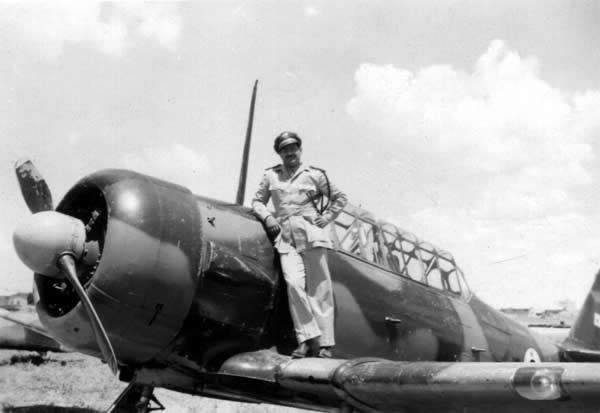
AT-6 Harvard of the Syrian Air Force

The end of World War II led to the withdrawal of the United Kingdom and France from the Middle East, and this included a withdrawal from Syria. In 1948, the Syrian Air Force was officially established after the first class of pilots graduated from a French-run flight school at Estabel airfield in Lebanon, using aircraft left behind by the French. Further training of early Syrian military fliers was continued with help of a sizeable group of Croat and German instructors, contracted by the Lebanese and Syrian governments from refugee camps in Italy. Among the foreign instructors were Mato Dukovac (a leading Croatian Air Force fighter ace of World War II) and Fritz Strehle (former Me.262 pilot with Jagdgeschwader 7 of the Luftwaffe), who trained Syrian pilots at Estabel in 1948 and at Nayrab airfield (south of Aleppo) in 1949.

Organized into three squadrons, one of which was equipped with North American T-6 Harvards, the air force participated in the 1948 Israeli War of Independence, conducting bombing raids against Israeli forces and settlements. One T-6 was lost to ground fire while attacking Ayelet Hashahar on 16 July, and another possibly shot down by Morris Mann (flying an Avia S-199) on 10 June. The Syrian Air Force claimed its sole kill of the war on 10 July when Mohammad a Din Wadi – rear gunner of a T-6 Harvard – shot down an Avia S-199 flown by Lionel Bloch of 101 Squadron with a .30 Cal AN-M2 Machine Gun, which was the first kill of the Airforce.

=== 1950s ===
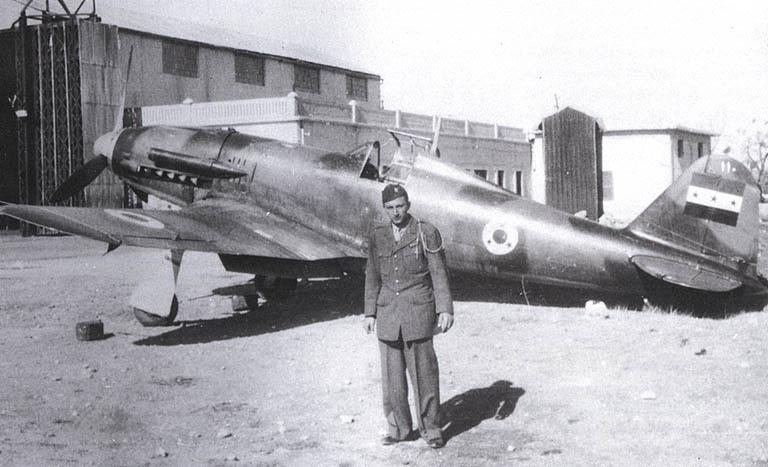
Fiat G.55 of the Syrian Air Force (around 1950)

During and immediately after this war, successive governments sought to bolster the air force through the acquisition of Fiat G.55s, Fiat G.59B-2s, and Fiat G.46-1s from Italy. In January 1950, a set of contracts was signed with London, providing for training of Syrian officers and pilots, along with the acquisition of de Havilland Chipmunk basic trainers, Supermarine Spitfire Mk 22s, and Gloster Meteor F.Mk 8 and T.Mk 7 jets from Great Britain. While the Chipmunks and Spitfires arrived without problems and entered service with the Flight School at Nayrab, the delivery of Meteors was held up by a temporary British arms embargo.

The original batch of Meteors manufactured for Syria was sold to France instead. It was only following additional negotiations that SyAF received its first jet aircraft, in the form of two Meteor F.Mk 8s. All 12 were in Syria by 9 March 1953. Another batch of seven refurbished ex-RAF F.Mk 8s and two FR.Mk 9 reconnaissance fighters followed in 1956. In summer 1954, six ex-RAF Meteor NF.Mk 13 were delivered without their radar equipment: in Syria, they were used for training purposes until 1958. Because the government of Great Britain imposed additional arms embargoes, most of the pilots for Meteors had to be trained in Egypt.

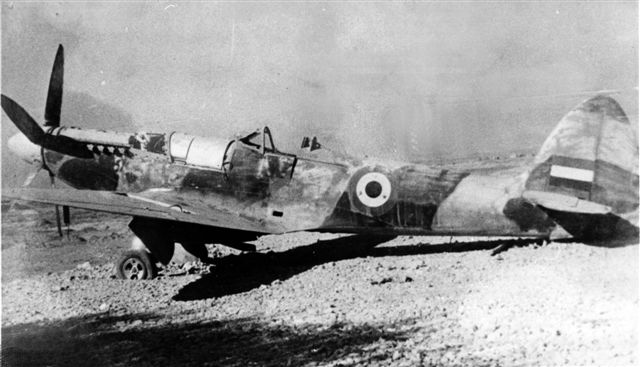
Wrecked Syrian Supermarine Spitfire Mk 22 (1950s)

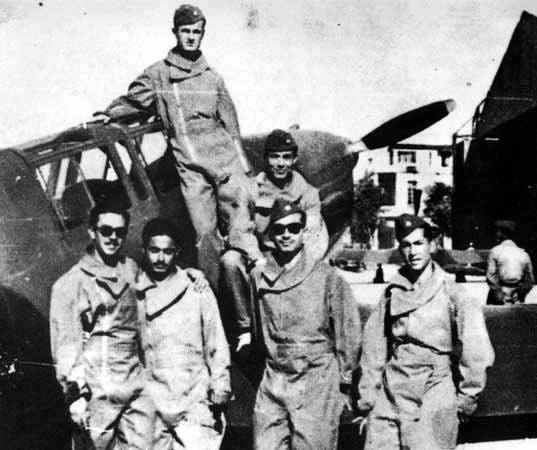
Hafez al-Assad (above) standing on the wing of a Fiat G.46-4B with fellow cadets at the Syrian AF Academy outside Aleppo, in mid-1950s. Hafez al-Assad underwent conversion training for jet fighters at the Air Force Academy at Bilbeis, in Egypt, in 1955. One of his instructors was Hosni Mubarak, later the commander of the Egyptian Air Force, and then the President of Egypt.

In 1955, Syria placed its first order for 24 MiG-15bis fighters and 4 MiG-15UTI two-seat conversion trainers from Czechoslovakia ('Operation 104'). Another batch of 24 MiG-15s was ordered in early 1956. All these aircraft were delivered to Egypt, by October 1956, but their pilots and ground crews were still undergoing training when Israel, followed by France and Great Britain, invaded Egypt in the course of the Suez Crisis of 1956. Three MiG-15UTIs were evacuated to Syria via Saudi Arabia and Jordan; 20 MiG-15bis and 1 MiG-15UTI were destroyed in British attacks on Abu Suweir Air Base. The second batch of 20 MiG-15bis' was not yet assembled: the aircraft in question were all damaged by British air strikes, but subsequently repaired and donated to Egypt. On 6 November 1956, Meteors from No. 9 Squadron Syrian Air Force had shot down a Royal Air Force Canberra PR.7 that was involved in reconnaissance of Syria and Iraq. The aircraft crashed on the border to Lebanon: one crewmember was killed, while two were captured alive.

Sixty MiG-17s – including 20 radar-equipped MiG-17PFs – were ordered at the end of 1956 and Syrian pilots were dispatched to the USSR and Poland for training. The first aircraft arrived in January 1957 and by the end of the year, two MiG-17 squadrons were defending the capital from their base at Damasucus' Mezzeh Military Airport. By the end of the year, additional orders were placed in the USSR for 12 Ilyushin Il-28 bombers.

In February 1958 Syria and Egypt joined to create the United Arab Republic. The Syrian Air Force was integrated into the United Arab Republic Air Force (UARAF) and ceased to exist. Nearly all of its aircraft and personnel, all of training aids and most of the equipment were re-deployed to Egypt, and replaced by two squadrons of MiG-17Fs of the UARAF. For example, recently delivered MiG-17PFs and their pilots formed the No. 31 'Crow-Bat' Squadron of the UARAF. During the times of the United Arab Republic, this unit was always commanded by a Syrian officer.

=== 1960s ===
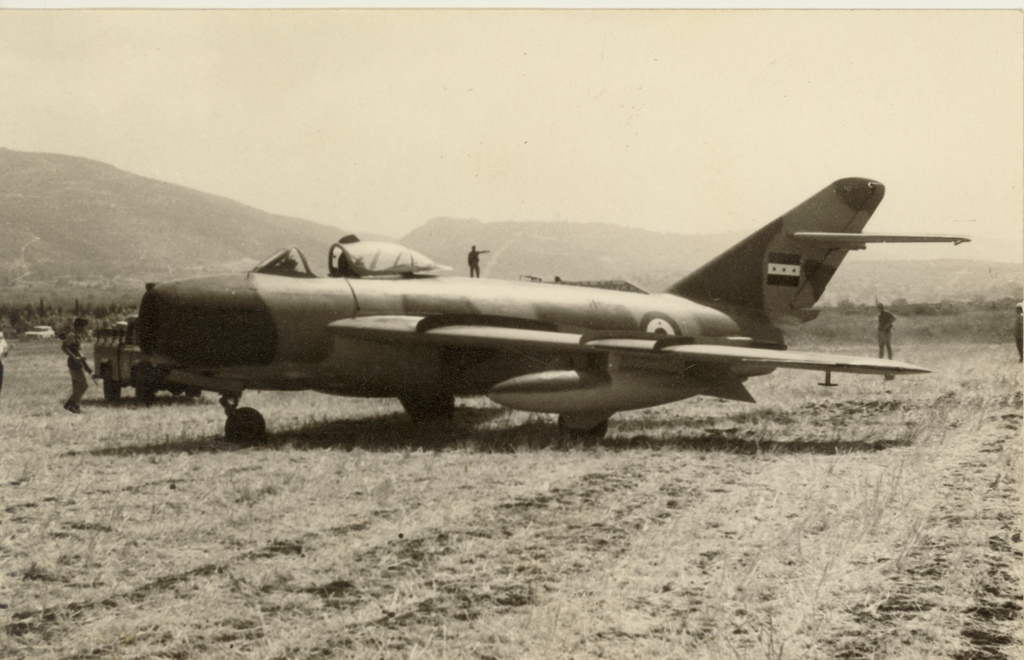
One of two MiG-17s of the Syrian Air Force that landed by error at Betzet airstrip, Israel on 12 August 1968

The union ended following the 1961 Syrian coup d'état. The new military flying service – officially designated the Syrian Arab Air Force (SyAAF) – was re-established later the same year, using aircraft left behind by the Egyptians, including about 40 MiG-17Fs and 4 Il-28s.

The new government of the Syrian Arab Republic attempted to buy additional aircraft from Germany and Italy, in 1961 and 1962. When all related efforts failed, Syria was left without a choice but to turn to Czechoslovakia for arms. By that time, Czechoslovakia was done producing fighters and interceptors, and thus the Syrians had to buy from Soviet Union instead. On 19 June 1962, Damascus and Moscow signed a major contract for arms, including an order for 34 MiG-21F-13 interceptors and 4 MiG-21U conversion trainers.

Delivered starting in spring 1963, MiG-21s entered service with two squadrons of the 3rd Air Brigade, based at Dmeyr Air Base, 40 km (25 miles) northeast of Damascus. MiG-17s were meanwhile operated by two squadrons of the 7th Air Brigade, based at Almezzeh Air Base, in Damascus.

With the ascent to power of the Baath Party, during the 1963 Syrian coup d'état, Hafez al-Assad (former Meteor and MiG-17PF-pilot), was appointed the Commander of SyAAF. Preoccupied with his involvement in domestic politics, Assad left the effective command of the SyAAF to his Deputy, Brigadier-General Mohammad Assad Moukiiad (former Meteor-pilot trained in Great Britain).

During theArab/Israeli Six-Day War, the SyAAF flew few air strikes on targets in northern Israel on the first day of the conflict but was subsequently evacuated to air bases in remote parts of Syria. In this fashion it evaded most of the Israeli air strikes that caused massive damage to Egyptian and Jordanian air bases. This, in turn, helped the IDF defeat the Syrian Army on the ground and led to Israel’s acquisition of the Golan Heights. After this conflict, Syria continued acquiring small numbers of MiG-17s from East Germany and MiG-21s from the Soviet Union. On 12 August, 1968, two Syrian MIG 17s landed in Northern Israel at Betzet, on a former British airfield that the IAF had abandoned. The two pilots were thought to have been defectors, but it was determined that they had a navigational error after needing to land due to low fuel. The pilots thought the airfield they were landing at was in Lebanon. After testing the MIGs to determine their characteristics and capabilities, the Israelis sent the MIG17s to the US for further testing.

=== 1970s ===
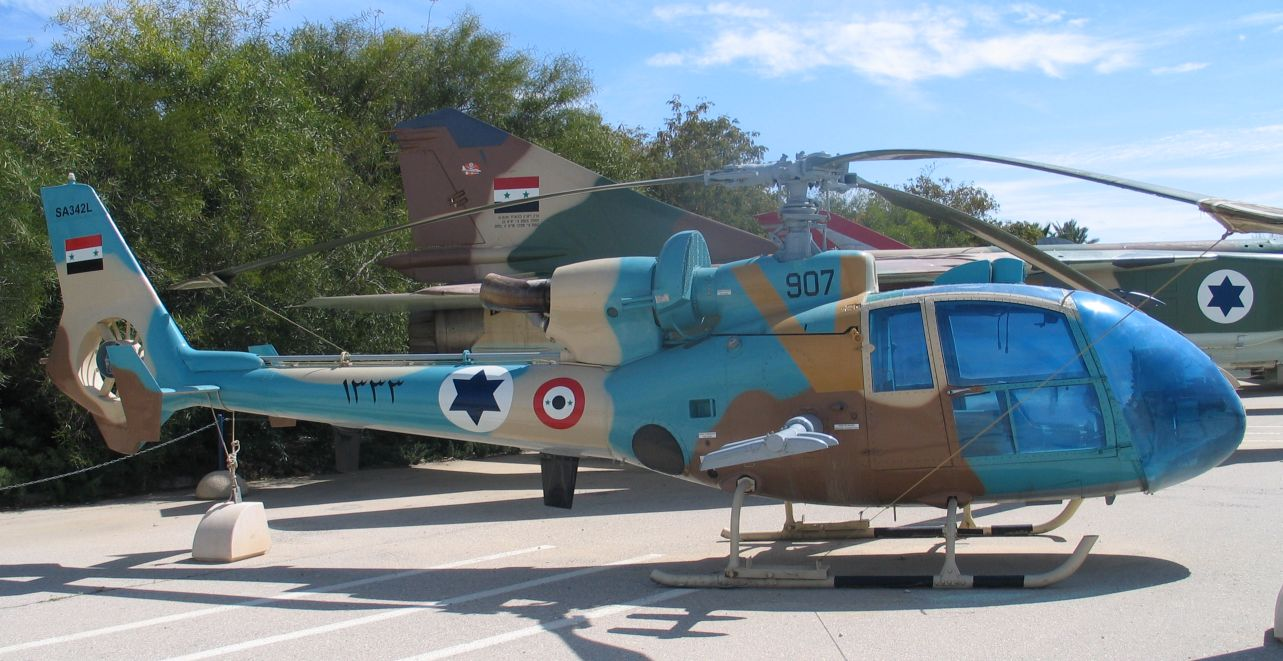
One of the SA341 Gazelle helicopters captured by Israel in the 1982 Lebanon War

In May 1973, a new arms deal was signed with the Soviet Union, resulting in deliveries of over 100 additional MiG-21M/MFs by the end of the year. The Yom Kippur War provided initial success for both Syria and Egypt, but the SyAAF suffered extensive losses in air combat as the war continued, prompting the Soviets to launch an air-bridge to Aleppo and Damascus, starting on 9 October 1973. Replacement aircraft initially included only MiG-17s and MiG-21s: in April 1974, Syria received the first two batches of MiG-23 fighter-bombers. Acquisition of additional aircraft from the USSR was stopped in 1975 due to diplomatic disagreement between the governments in Damascus and Moscow.

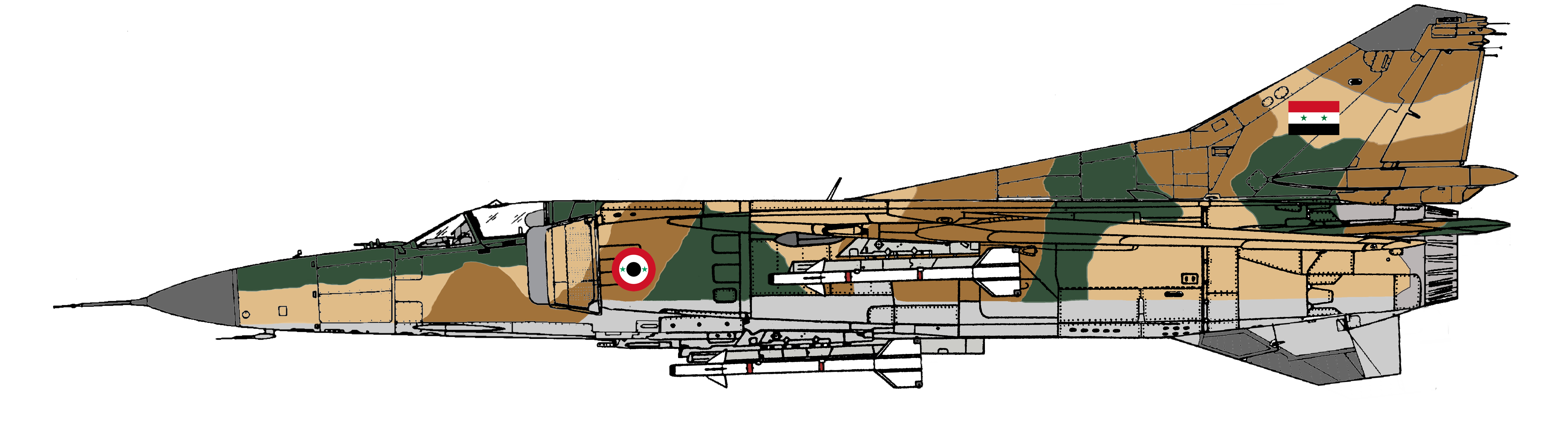
An example of the MiG-23MSs that Syria received in 1974.

In the late 1970s, an insurgency characterised by dozens of assassinations of government officials and military officers erupted in Syria. By 1978, the Muslim Brotherhood in Syria joined the armed uprising. Concerned by destabilisation of the government of President Hafez al-Assad, Moscow decided to restart providing arms and military aid. In April of the same year, a new arms deal was signed, including deliveries of more advanced MiG-23MF and MiG-25 interceptors, and additional MiG-23BN and Su-22 fighter-bombers, plus deployment of up to 4000 Soviet advisors. The insurgency continued to spread nonetheless, and included attacks on the Soviet advisors.

=== 1980s ===
In 1981, the commander of the SyAAF, Major-General Mamdouh Hamdi Abaza, was assassinated by the Muslim Brotherhood in Syria. In early 1982, hundreds of SyAAF officers became involved in a coup attempt against President Hafez al-Assad, originally planned to take place in coordination with an armed uprising in the city of Hama. El Assad’s government crushed the uprising in Hama in bloody fashion, and subsequently purged the SyAAF.

The Syrian Arab Air Force thus entered the 1982 Lebanon War with Israel’s IAF in significantly weakened condition and suffered massive losses in a series of aerial combats between 6 and 11 June 1982. Israel claimed the destruction of 85 Syrian MiGs (including MiG-21s as well as MiG-23s). The Syrian Arab Air Force claimed they used Aerospatiale Gazelle helicopters successfully in the anti-armour role against advancing Israeli ground forces. In one such engagement, an Israeli tank column was stopped for some hours by SyAAF Gazelle missile strikes while approaching Ein Zehalta. The helicopters did not stop,the Israeli advance, and in fact, one Gazelle was captured and converted to Israeli markings during the war.

Immediately after the 1982 Lebanon War, the USSR again refused deliveries of more advanced aircraft to the Syrian Air Force. It was only in August 1982, that Moscow changed its mind and granted permission for delivery of MiG-23ML interceptors, followed by advanced Su-22M-4 fighter-bombers. In an attempt to help Syria establish a strategic balance with Israel, in 1986 the Syrians were granted permission to place orders for 24 MiG-29s and 24 Su-24s. Deliveries of these commenced in 1987, but were still incomplete by the time the Soviet Union officially ceased providing military aid to Syria, in 1989.

=== 1990s/2000s ===
Short on spares and lacking funding for fuel and maintenance, the SyAAF was largely grounded for most of the 1990s and 2000s. Reports regarding purchases of Su-27s in 2000–2001, MiG-29SMTs, MiG-31s, and Yak-130s from the period 2006–2008, have all proven to be unfounded. The only reinforcement the air force acquired during this period came in form of 28 MiG-23MLDs and 5 MiG-23UBs acquired from Belarus in 2008. In 2008 Syria agreed to purchase 36 Russian military aircraft, but delivery of these was postponed by Russia due to the civil war in Syria starting in 2011.

=== During the Syrian civil war up to the fall of the Assad regime ===
In July 2012 at the Farnborough Air Show it was announced that Russia would not deliver any new aircraft including the MiG-29M/M2s and Yak-130s to Syria while there was still a crisis there, but it would still respect any previous refurbishment and maintenance contracts such as for the MiG-25s.

During the initial phase of the Syrian civil war, up to mid-2012, the Syrian Air Force was involved in secondary roles, with no firing from aircraft and helicopters.

The situation changed on 22 March 2012, with an escalation in the use of airpower by Government forces, starting with armed Mi-8 and Mi-17 helicopter gunships firing rockets and machine guns against Syrian opposition forces. The air war escalated further in mid June 2012, with the use of Mi-24/25 attack helicopters capable of dropping standard aviation bombs weighing up to 250 kg, while transport helicopters started dropping barrel bombs, aerial IEDs.

On 24 July 2012, attack sorties by fixed-wing aircraft were reported by the rebels and recorded on video: initially L-39 COIN armed trainers began using rockets, bombs and guns but they were quickly joined by MiG-21s and MiG-23s. A few weeks later Su-22 ground attack aircraft were used and in November 2012, Su-24 medium bombers were filmed bombing rebels. In December 2012, conventionally armed Scud missiles and other similar ballistic missiles were fired against rebel positions.

Following a report on the appearance of newly delivered S-8 air-to-ground rocket pods previously not operated by the Syrian Air Force, being employed on different aircraft, on 22 October 2013, a S-8 armed MiG-29 was spotted and recorded on video while flying over Damascus, suggesting that the type was pushed into action for ground attack, possibly after the pilots attended specific training on the type. Subsequently, MiG-29's were recorded performing rocket and gun attack runs on rebel positions.

The first reported activity of Syrian MiG-25 aircraft in the civil war was recorded on 8 February 2014, when two Turkish Air Force F-16s were scrambled to intercept a Syrian MiG-25 which was approaching the Turkish border. On 27 March 2014, a MiG-25 was clearly filmed while flying at medium altitude over Hama Eastern countryside, possibly delivering the bomb seen hitting the ground in the same video. Until February 2014, Syrian MiG-25s were not seen, perhaps due to the type of war, different from the role of the MiG-25 and possibly due to initial technical difficulties in keeping the MiG-25 fleet operational. The use of the MiG-25 in the Syrian Civil War marks the starting point since when all the known types of Syrian combat aircraft and ballistic missiles came into use.

With the start of aerial operations by the Syrian Air Force, in August 2012, online publications probably overestimating rebels' claims on the number of destroyed aircraft, assumed that the Syrian Air Force was suffering significant technical difficulties, resulting in less than half of the best SAAF ground attack aircraft such as the Mi-25 Hind-D being serviceable. The publications reported that an increased number of conflict fronts and severe maintenance burdens dramatically worsened the situation, which was reportedly difficult before the war. These problems were thought to account for the use of L-39ZA (attack variant) jets, before further escalations. Operational limitations were overcome during 2013 as Syrian pilots and technicians with the assistance of foreign advisers and technicians began to improve their operational skills. In December 2013 Jane's reported that the Syrian Air Force had dramatically improved its operational capabilities during 2013, and was now frequently conducting up to 100 sorties per day with half of these constituting combat sorties.

Insurgents counter the Syrian Air Force with truck mounted, medium and heavy machine guns, anti-aircraft guns, small arms fire and starting in late 2012, MANPADS up to modern Russian and Chinese designs.

As the Syrian Air Force became more involved, the insurgents obtained more anti-aircraft equipment, captured air defense sites and warehouses while receiving shipments of Chinese and Russian material from external sponsors. An improvement in accuracy was achieved and several Syrian Air Force jets and helicopters were shot down from August 2012. Since insurgents besieged many airports, many of the aircraft were shot down taking off or landing. The raiding and shelling of airbases led to aircraft and helicopters being damaged or destroyed on the ground.

In May 2014 Russia announced that it would supply Syria with Yakovlev Yak-130s. Syria was expected to receive nine aircraft by the end of 2014, 12 in 2015 and 15 in 2016, for a total of 36 airplanes. However, as of 2022, no deliveries had taken place.

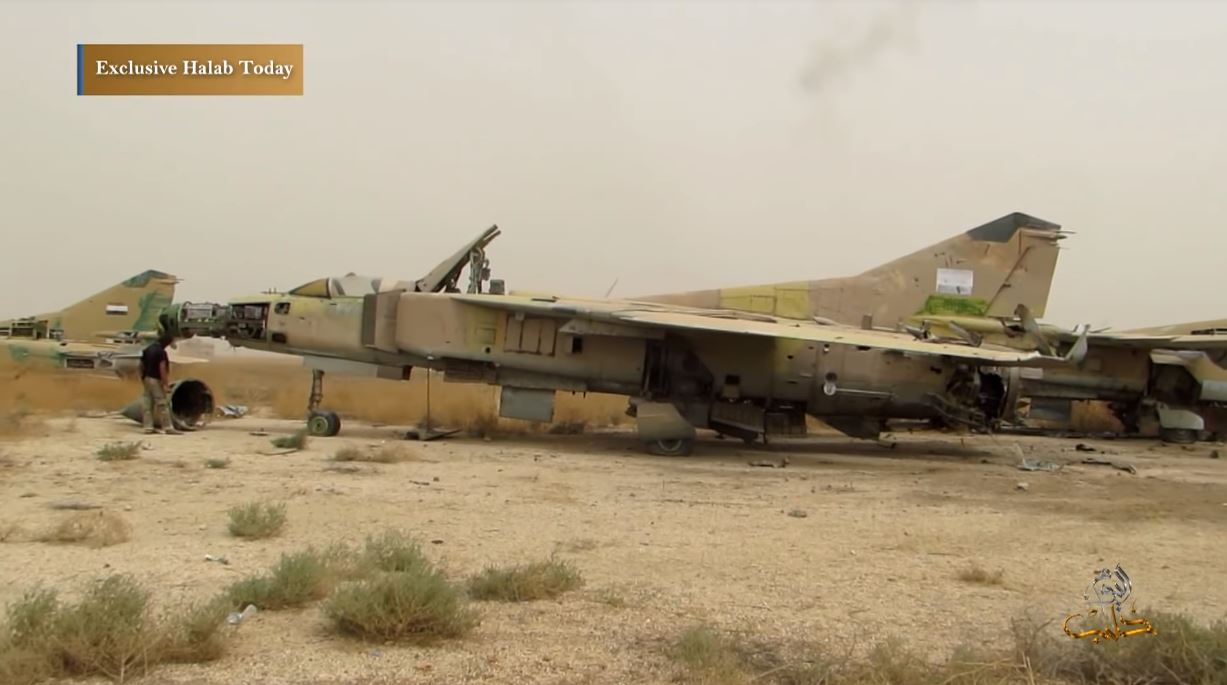
Several derelict SyAAF MiG-23s after the Siege of Abu al-Duhur Airbase in September 2015

In spite of occasional losses the Syrian Air Force remained largely unchallenged, efficient and feared by the rebels until its collapse. Compared to Western air forces fighting against similarly armed enemies in Syria, Iraq and Afghanistan, the main disadvantage of the Syrian Air Force was the lack of precision guided weapons which allow the aircraft to stay out of range of small arms fire, AAA and MANPADS, while bombing accurately. The same weakness prevents them from hitting targets of opportunity in the same mission. In 2014, Jane's Defence and Combat Aircraft Monthly report some MiG-29s and possibly some Su-24s capable of launching precision guided munitions.

Syrian pilots spend most of their flying time at low to medium altitude where battlefield threats are more potent. Based on the aircraft type, Syrian pilots use different attack techniques for unguided munitions. L-39s attack in a dive, fast jets usually attacked in a low to medium altitude bombing run at high speed, firing thermal decoy flares against IR homing missiles and zooming after the attack. Later, fast jets added rocket and gun diving attacks. Helicopters were seen flying at unusually high altitudes which minimized their accuracy and increased collateral damage, but reduced losses since they did not have the high speed and acceleration of jet fighters; the altitude putting them out of range of most of the ground threats. Mi-24/25 gunships were observed delivering decoy flares as well.

The Syrian Air Force frequently attacks insurgent forces with helicopter gunships in populated areas with unguided weaponry and the bombings often cause collateral damage to the civilian population and infrastructure. From the end of 2012 until December 2014, Syrian Air Force L-39 were seldom seen, one of the two airbases for L-39 was captured and the other was besieged. In December 2014, videos surfaced showing the aircraft coming back to operational status after a factory overhaul inside Syria.

At the beginning of August 2015, a summary of the recent Syrian Air Force activity reported that during July 2015, the Syrian Air Force performed 6,673 air attacks, the highest number since the beginning of the war. It was reported that between October 2014 and July 2015, at least 26,517 attacks were made. This showed that aircraft losses had been overestimated, while the airframe overhauling and rotation increased the overall combat readiness of the Syrian Air Force since Syria could not count on replacements, apart from some refurbished ex-Iraqi Su-22s, delivered from Iran in the Spring of 2015, which had been flown there during the Gulf War in 1991. In early 2015, it was rumored that Russian pilots were flying operations for the Syrian Air Force.

On 18 June 2017, US military officials confirmed that a U.S. F/A-18E Super Hornet shot down a Syrian Sukhoi Su-22 after the warplane dropped bombs near SDF fighters south of Tabqa.

=== 2024 ===
Following the Syrian civil war and Hay'at Tahrir al-Sham (HTS) bringing Bashar al-Assad's regime to an end, the Israeli Air Force executed strikes nearly destroying the entire air force between 8 and 10 December 2024, to prevent strategic assets falling into the hands of militant groups.

=== 2025 ===
In January, the former HTS rebels began repairing helicopters and reforming air units. Videos published on social media indicate that the Syrian caretaker government had some operational Mi-17, Ka-27, and SA342 Gazelle helicopters. According to Militarnyi, former pilots of the Syrian Arab Air Force may have been recruited into the reformed Syrian Air Force.

The Syrian Air Force utilized helicopters during the March 2025 Western Syria clashes. According to Militarnyi, at least one Mi-24 attack helicopter was seen engaging unidentified targets with unguided rockets.

From early April, the Air Force's fixed-wing infrastructure came under pressure from Israeli aerial assaults. Across early April, multiple Syrian airbases, most notably the T4 (Tiyas), Hama Air Base, and facilities near Damascus, were struck in over 30 separate incidents, reportedly causing significant runway damage and destroying key military hardware.

By mid‑May, efforts to restore capabilities were underway. On 15 May, Defence Minister Murhaf Abu Qasra convened with Airforce Commander Asim Hawari to review progress in rehabilitating air units affected by the December 2024 airstrikes. On 20–21 May, Syrian air and ground infrastructure again became targets. The Khmeimim Air Base in Latakia, used jointly by Syrian and Russian forces, came under assault by the Burkan al‑Furat insurgent group. The clash resulted in multiple casualties, though Russian forces reportedly maintained control.

In August, the Syrian government signed a bilateral defence deal with Turkey, to help rebuild the Air Force, with 21 cadets undergoing training in Turkish academies.

== Organization ==
The current (2025) organization and overall status of the Syrian Air Force is unclear.

=== Organization before the fall of the Assad regime ===
As of 2017, the Syrian Arab Air force consisted of following units:

- 20th Air Division, with 3 fighter-bomber brigades, 3 helicopter brigades, and 1 transport brigade (southern Syria)
- 22nd Air Division, with 4 fighter-bomber brigades, 1 helicopter brigade, and Air Force College (central and north-western Syria)

These included following units:

- 17 Interceptor and fighter-bomber squadrons (each with 1–5 operational aircraft)
- 8 helicopter squadrons (each with 2–8 operational helicopters)
- 1 VIP transport group
- 1 training group

=== Air bases ===
It is unknown which and indeed how many airbases of Syrian Air Force are active as of 2025.

- Abu al-Duhur Air Base, active in 2026.
- Khalid bin al-Walid Air Base, Kuweires Sharqi, 40 km east of Aleppo, active in 2026.

==== Air bases during Ba'athist rule ====
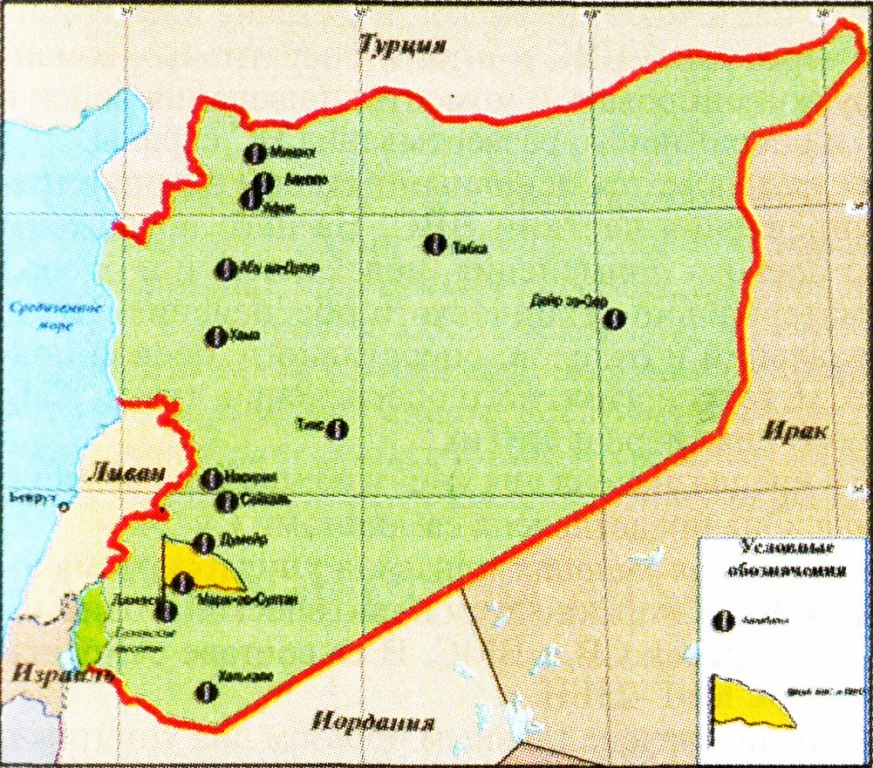
Syrian air bases in 2015

Syrian insurgents overran several air bases in north-western, northern and southern Syria, including Marj al-Sultan and Taftanaz Air Base (mid-January 2013), Dhab'a Air Base (better known as al-Qussayr, in April 2013), and Kshesh Air Base (October 2013).

ISIL forces captured Tabqa Air Base on 24 August 2014.

== Pre-Syrian Civil War aircraft inventory ==
Due to the high security level on everything military related in Ba'athist Syria, the past of the Syrian Arab Air Force is still largely unknown. This makes it hard to judge what was the real strength of the air force. Additionally, considerable losses to the Assad-opposition forces in the country's civil war are not accounted for here, as are not any developments since the fall of the Assad regime. The following information is compiled from multiple, pre-2012 Syrian civil war sources.

According to the Center for Strategic and International Studies, the Ba'athist Syrian Arab Air Force's total aircraft inventory consisted of:

- 575 Fixed-wing aircraft:
  - Combat/Reconnaissance/OCU aircraft: 461
  - Training aircraft: 76
  - Transport aircraft: 26
- 191 Rotary-wing aircraft:
  - Attack helicopters: 71
  - Armed transport/utility helicopters: 120

== Aircraft ==
=== Current inventory ===
In late 2025, the World Air Forces publication by FlightGlobal, which tracks the aircraft inventories of world's air forces and publishes its counts annually, removed all Syrian Air Force's aircraft from their World Air Forces 2026 report. It is thus questionable if the Syrian Air Force has any flying aircraft in their inventory as of December 2025. Janes reported that one Mi-8/17 and two Gazelle helicopters participated in a parade held in Damascus in December 2025.

According to the 2026 edition of the Military Balance published by the International Institute for Strategic Studies, the Syrian Air Force operates an unknown number of fixed-wing aircraft and helicopters. Two L-39 jet trainers and two Mi-24 helicopters performed a flyby over Syrian Air Force cadets graduation ceremony at Kuweires Military Aviation Institute in July 2026. A L-39 jet trainer was also displayed at the 63rd Damascus International Fair at the Ministry of Defense pavilion.

Aircraft	Origin	Type	Variant	Inventory	Notes
Combat aircraft
Sukhoi Su-22	Soviet Union	Fighter-bomber	M3/M4	2	
Helicopters
Mil Mi-8	Soviet Union	Utility		2	
Mil Mi-17	Soviet Union	Utility			
Mil Mi-24	Soviet Union	Attack	Mi-24D; Mi-24P	2	
Aérospatiale Gazelle	France	Utility	SA342L		
Transport
Bombardier Global Express	Canada	VIP transport	Global 6000	At least 1	
Ilyushin Il-76	Russia	Strategic and tactical airlifter	Il-76T/Il-76TD	At least 1	Returned to Syria by the Libyan National Army.
Trainer aircraft
Aero L-39	Czechoslovakia	Jet trainer	ZO/ZA	3	

=== Retired ===
Previous aircraft operated were the following aircraft:

- Aero L-29 Delfin
- Antonov An-2
- Antonov An-26
- Avro Anson
- Beriev Be-12
- de Havilland DH.100 Vampire
- de Havilland Tiger Moth
- Douglas C-47 Dakota
- Douglas C-47 Skytrain
- Fairchild 24
- Fiat G.46
- Fiat G.55
- Gloster Meteor
- Ilyushin Il-28
- Ilyushin Il-76
- Junkers Ju 52
- Kamov Ka-28
- Kamov Ka-226
- MBB 223 Flamingo
- MFI-17 Mushshak
- MiG-15
- MiG-17
- MiG-19
- MiG-21
- MiG-23
- MiG-25
- MiG-29
- Mil Mi-1
- Mil Mi-2
- Mil Mi-4
- Mil Mi-6
- Mil Mi-14
- North American T-6 Texan
- Percival Proctor
- Piper J-3 Cub
- Piper PA-32
- Sukhoi Su-7
- Sukhoi Su-24
- Supermarine Spitfire
- Tupolev Tu-143
- Yakovlev Yak-18
- Yakovlev Yak-40

=== Lost during Syrian Civil War ===
During the ongoing Syrian Civil War, the Syrian Air force suffered numerous losses of fixed, and rotary aircraft in the opening years. However, with Russian and Iranian support, combat readiness of the Syrian Arab Air Force assets had significantly increased during the later years of the conflict.

The takeover of Syria by the rebels and the fall of the Assad regime in November/December 2024, combined with Israeli strikes throughout 2025 led to the Syrian Arab Air Force disintegrating.

== Commanders ==
The following officers have served as Commanders of the Air Force:

- (1948–1948) Colonel Abdel Wahad al-Hakim
- (1948–1949) Colonel Sallahaddin Hankin
- (1950–1951) Colonel Sayed Habbi
- (1951–1953) Brigadier General Souheil Ashi
- (1953–1957) UARAF period (two MiG-17F-units based in Syria were controlled by the 'UARAF Eastern Division', commanded by Brigadier General Rashed Kelani)
- (1957–1963) Major General Wadih Moukabari
- (1963–1963) Major General Nur Allah Haj Ibrahim
- (1963–1965) Major General Louis Dakar
- (1965–1970) Brigadier General Hafez al-Assad (actually serving as commander only 1965–1966; subsequently preoccupied with involvement in internal politics, therefore appointed Brigadier General Moukiiad as his Deputy)
- (1966–1970) Brigadier General Mohammad Assad Moukiiad
- (1971–1976) Major General Naji Jamil
- (1976–1978) Subhi Haddad
- (1978–1981) Major General Mamdouh Hamdi Abazza
- list incomplete
- (–1994) Ali Malahafji
- (1994–1999) Major General Muhammad al-Khuli
- list incomplete
- (2006–2010) Major General Yusef Othman al-Ahmad
- (2010) Major General Ahmad al-Ratyb
- (2010 – 2012) Major General Ali Mahmoud
- (2012 – 2013) Major General Issam Hallaq
- (2013–2020) Major General Ahmad Baloul
- (2020–2024) Major General Hasan Wadih
- (2024–2024) Major General Tawfiq Khaddour
- (2025–) Brigadier General Asim Rashid al-Hawari

== Ranks ==
=== Commissioned officer ranks ===
The rank insignia of commissioned officers.

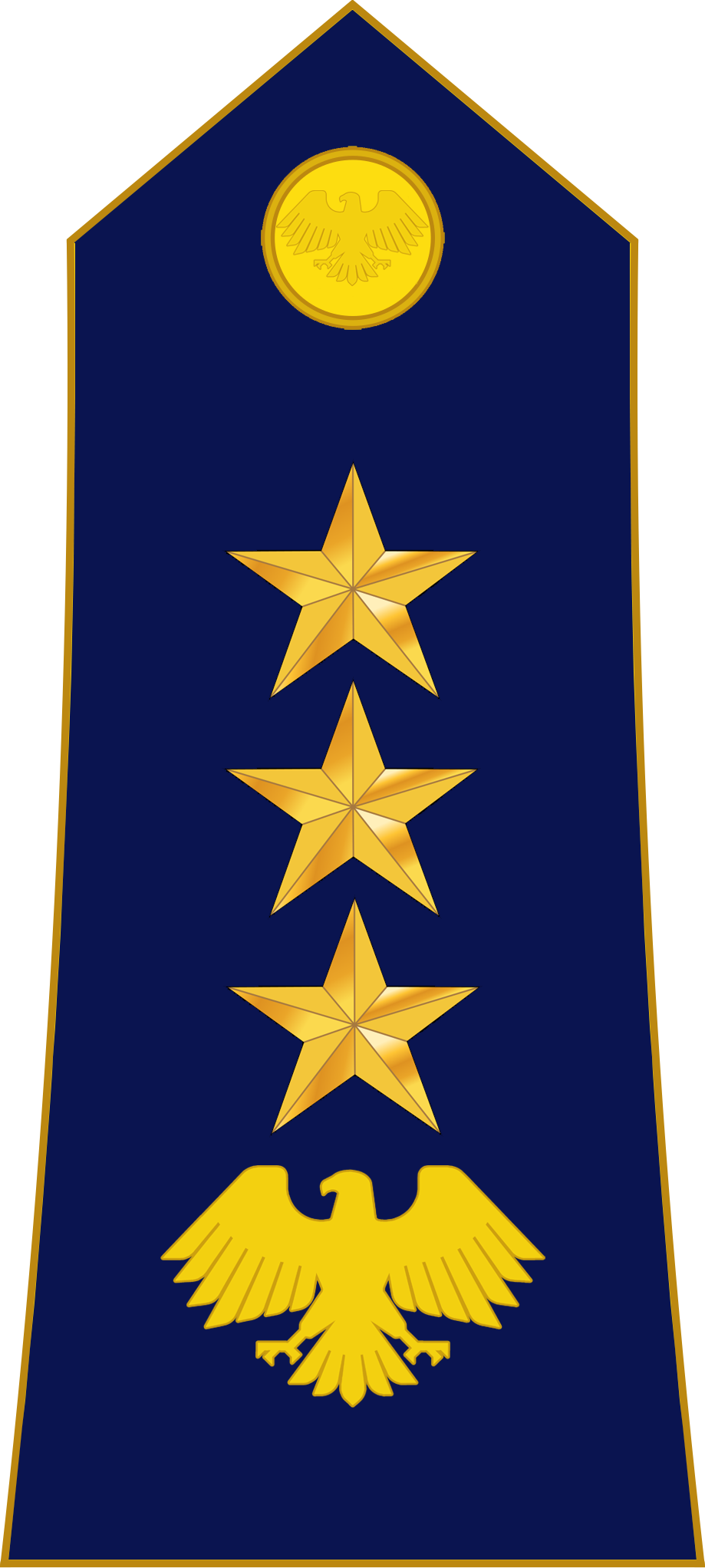
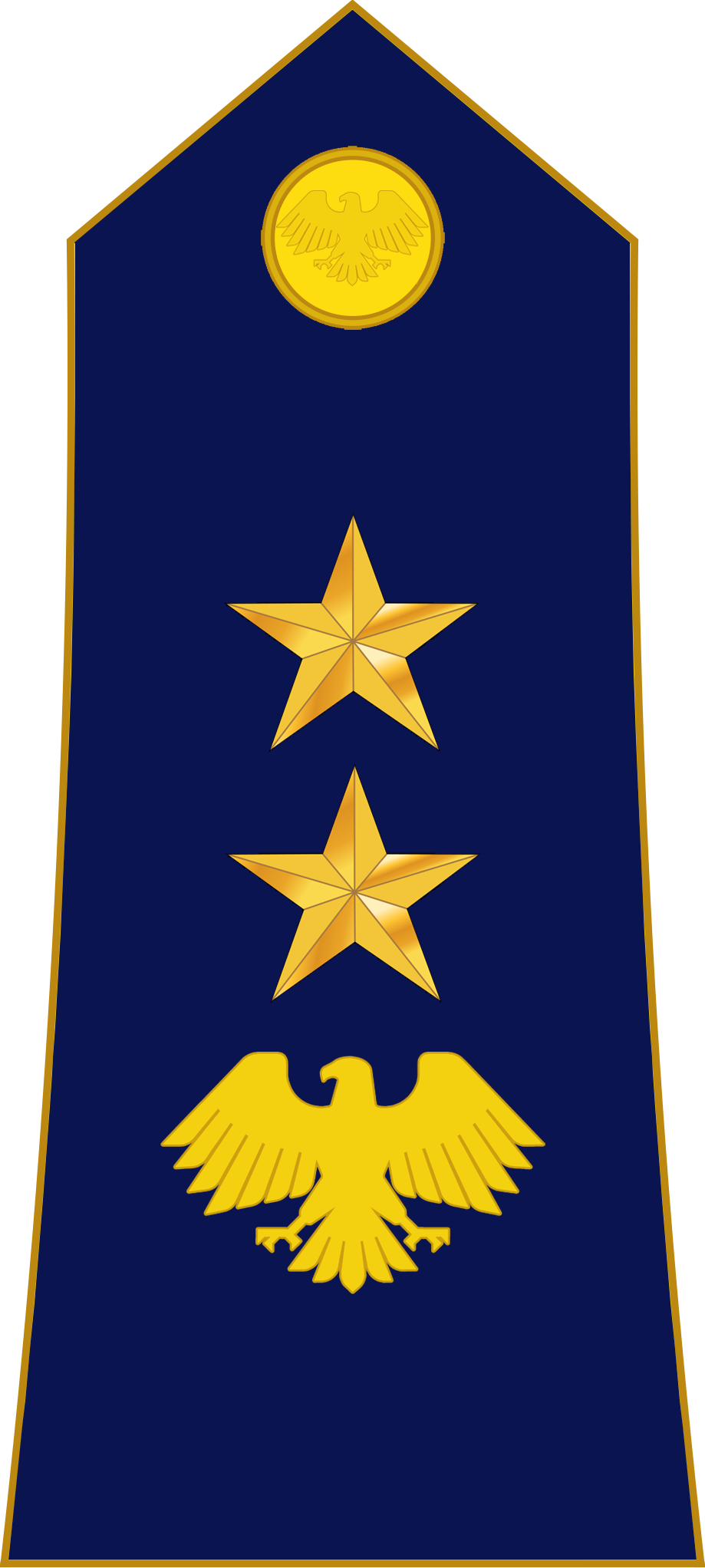
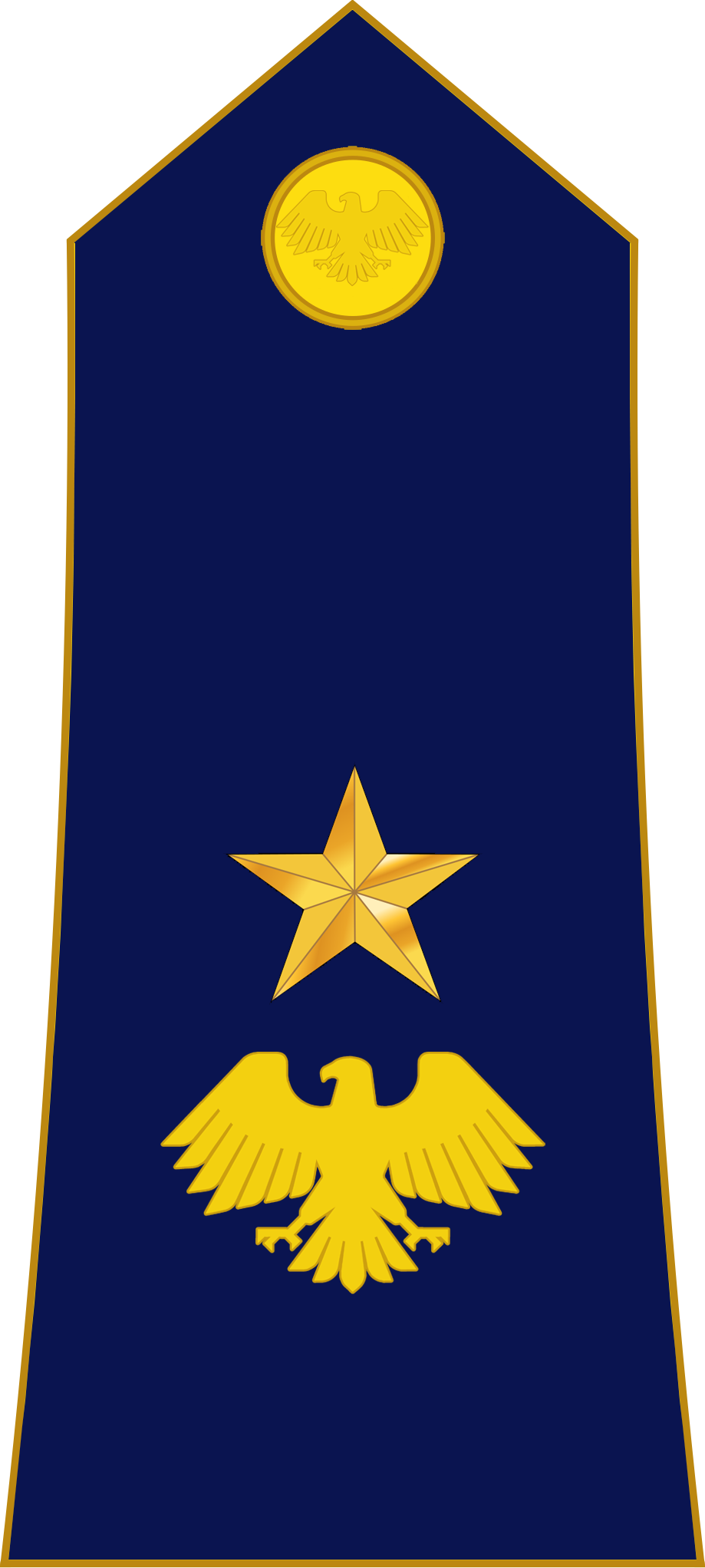
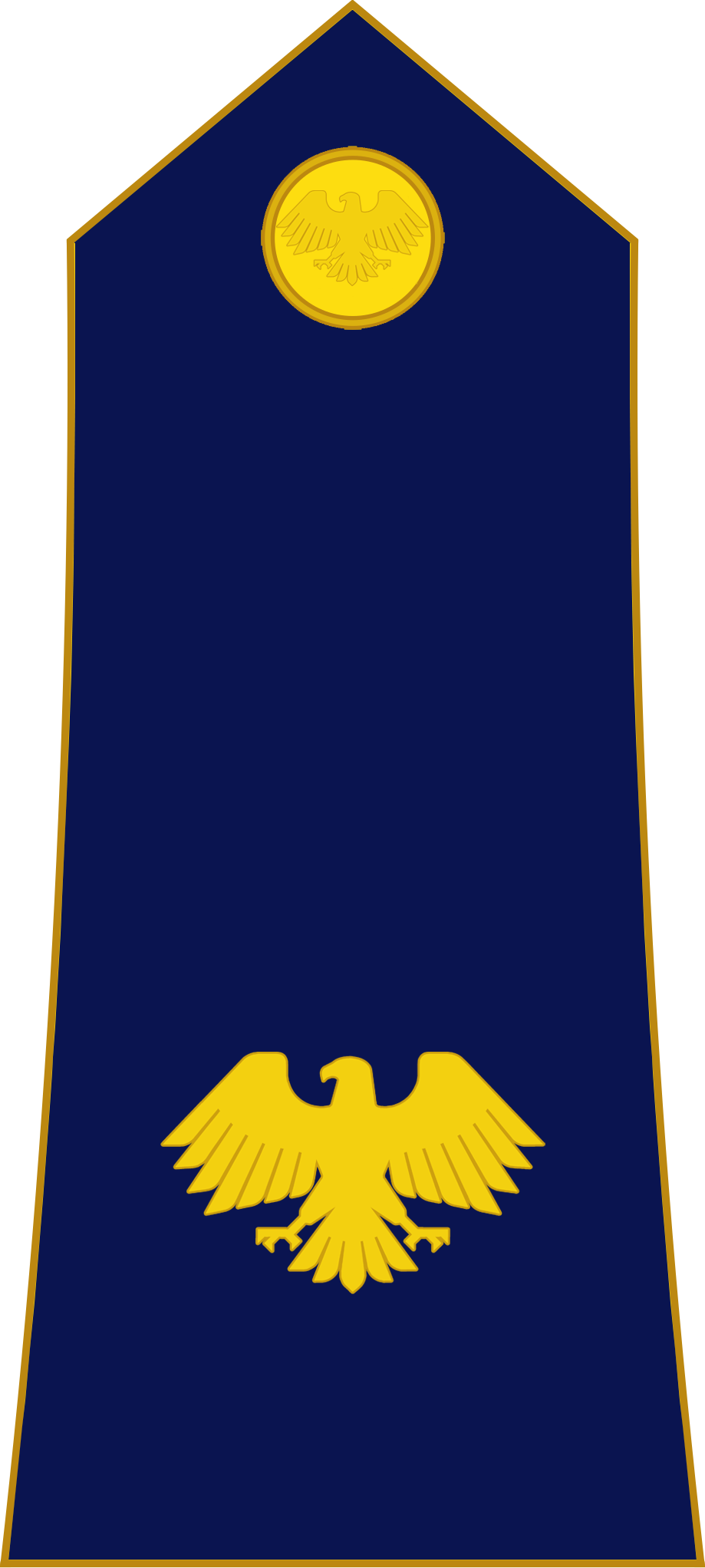
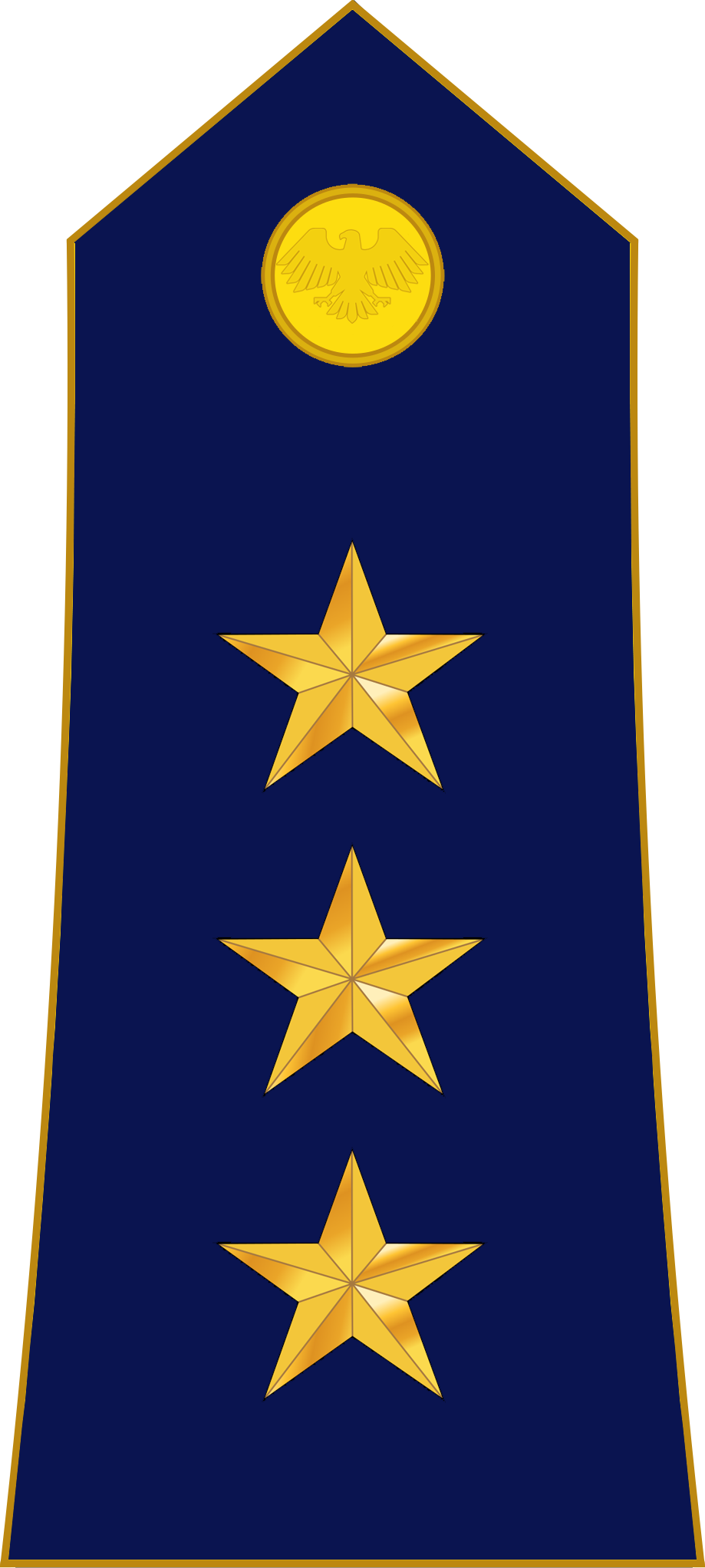
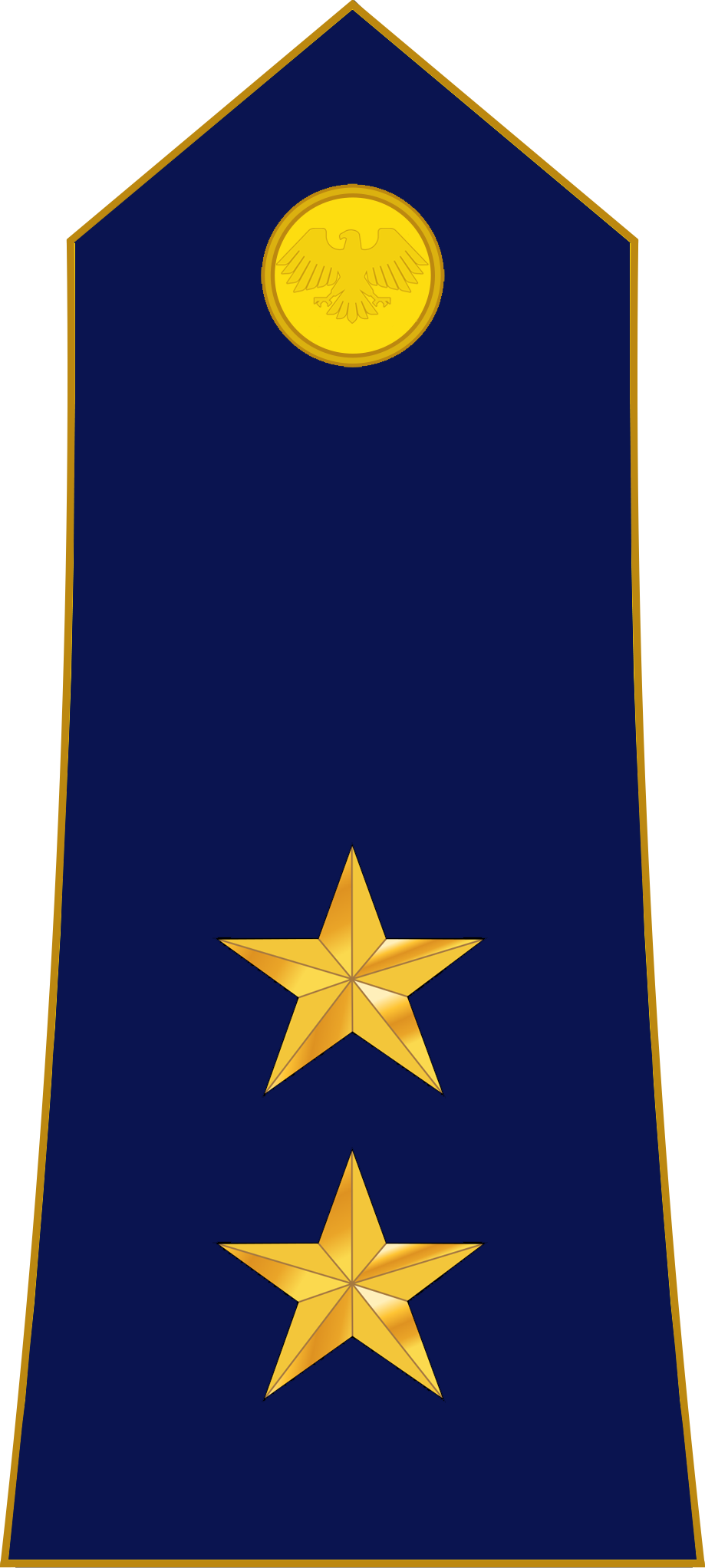
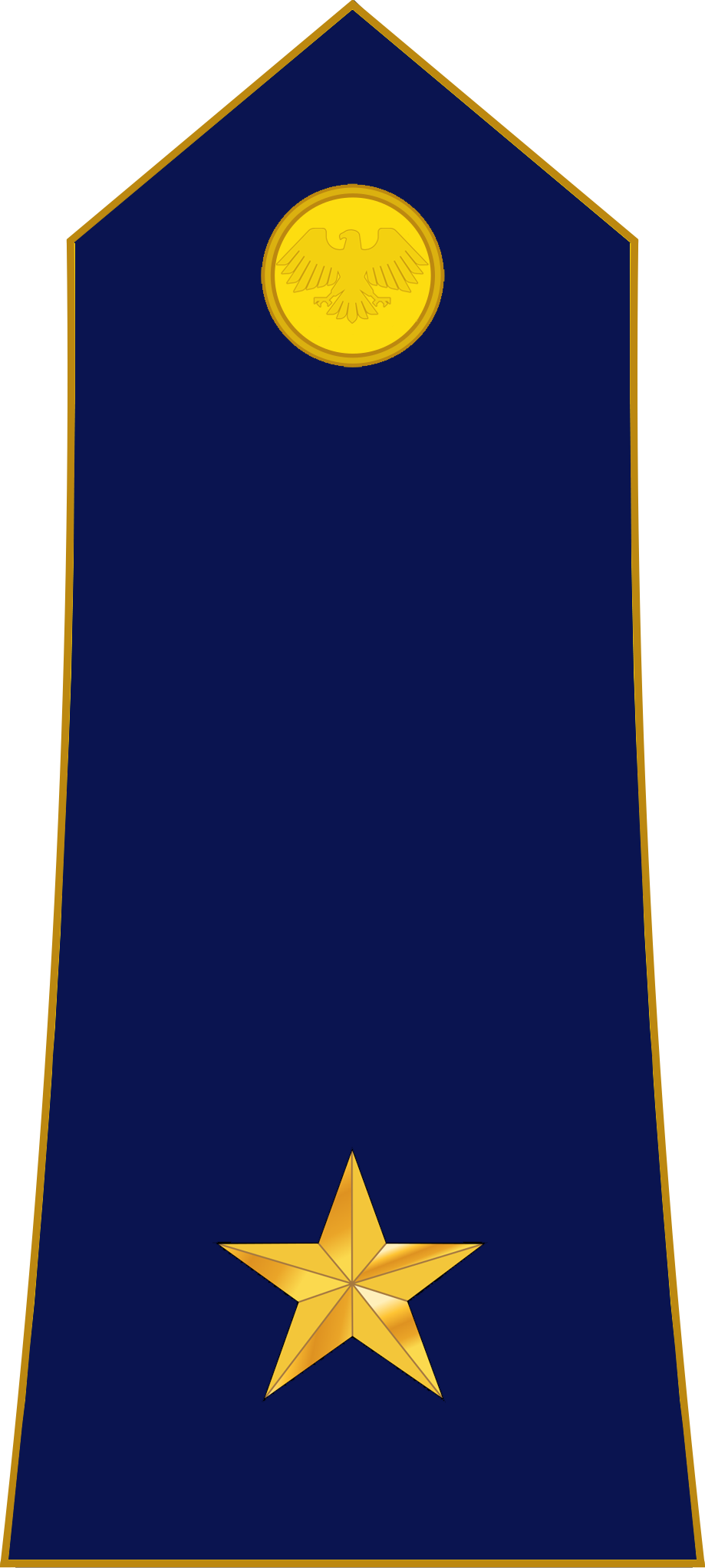
Rank group	General / flag officers					Senior officers			Junior officers
Syrian Air Force
Syrian Air Force	فريق; Fariq	عماد أول; Eimad 'awal	عماد; Eimad	لواء; Alliwa'	عميد; Amid	عقيد; Aqid	مقدم; Muqaddam	رائد; Ra'id	نقيب; Naqib	ملازم أول; Mulazim awwal	ملازم; Mulazim

=== Other ranks ===
The rank insignia of non-commissioned officers and enlisted personnel.

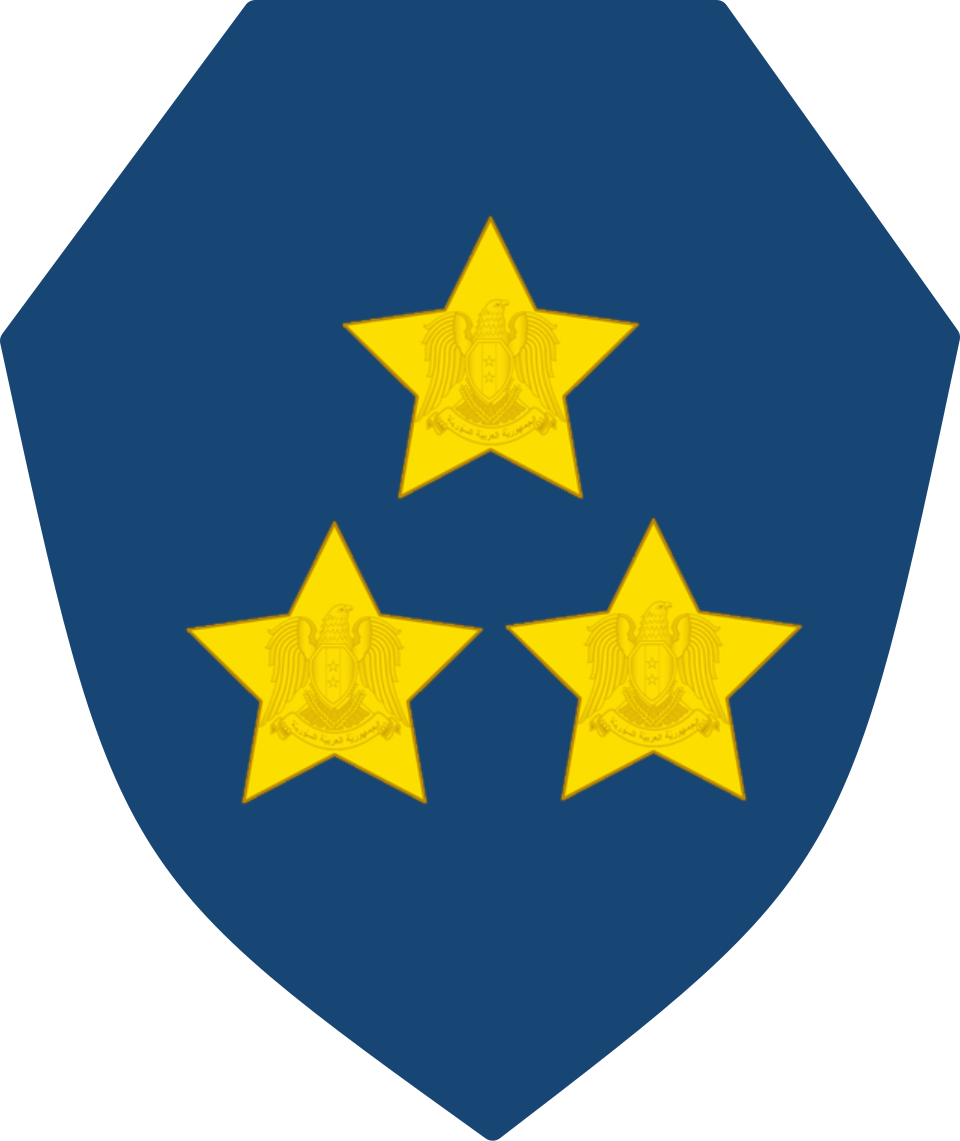
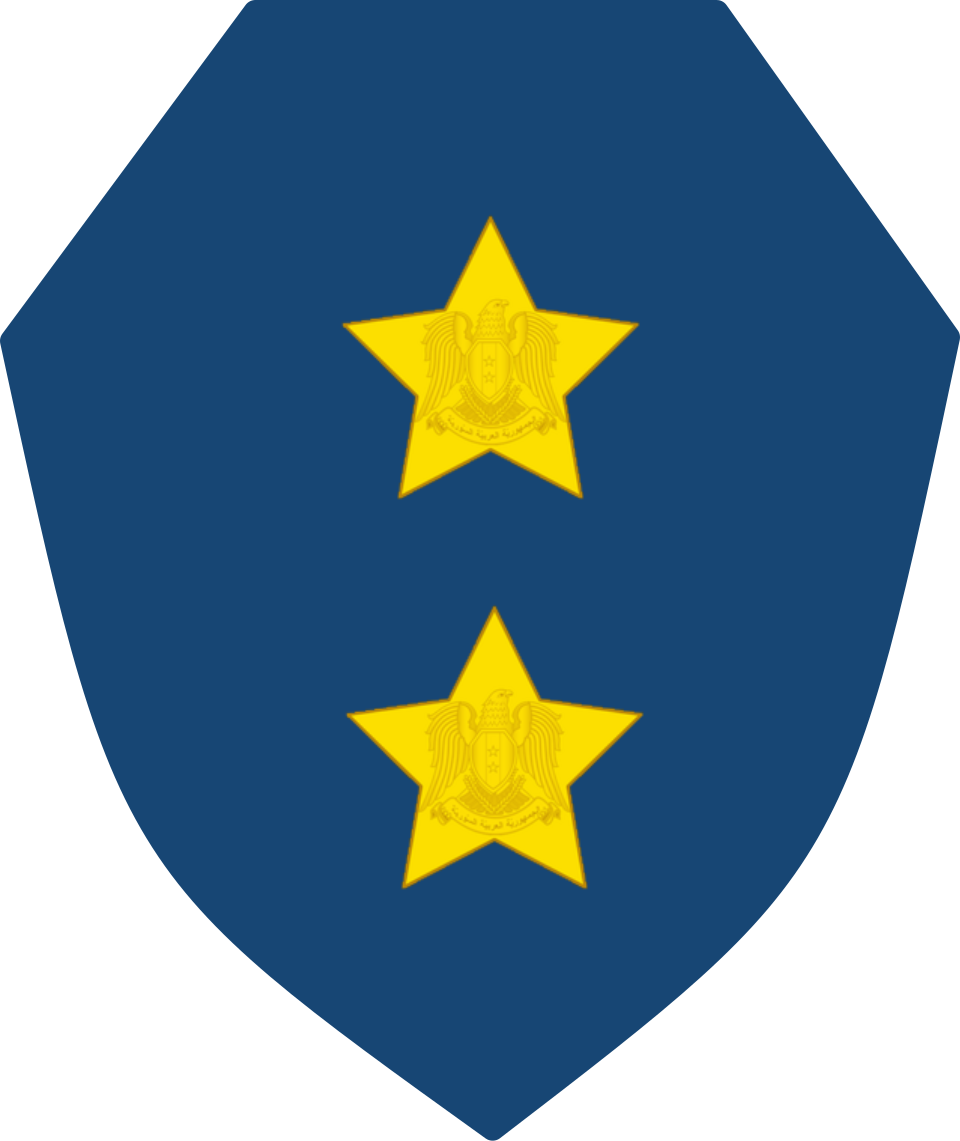
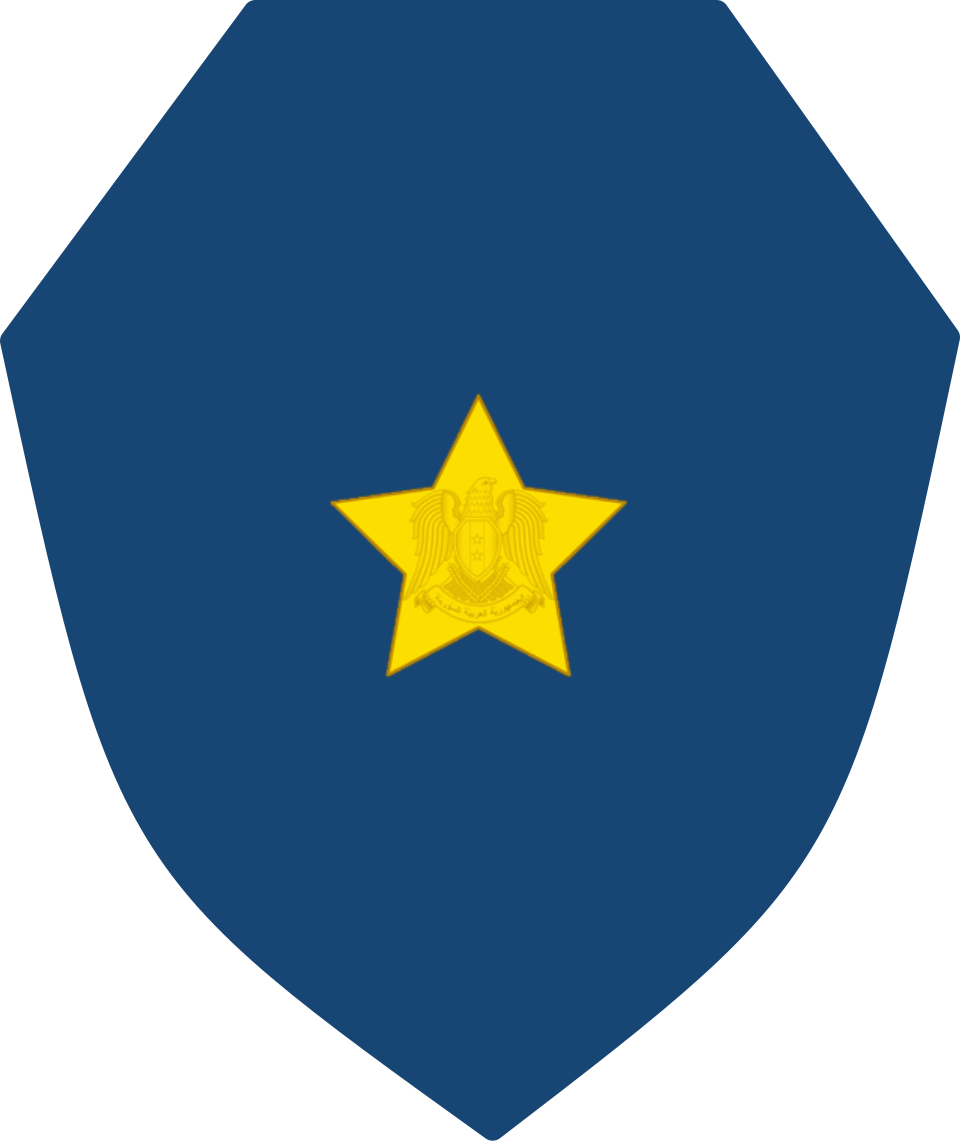
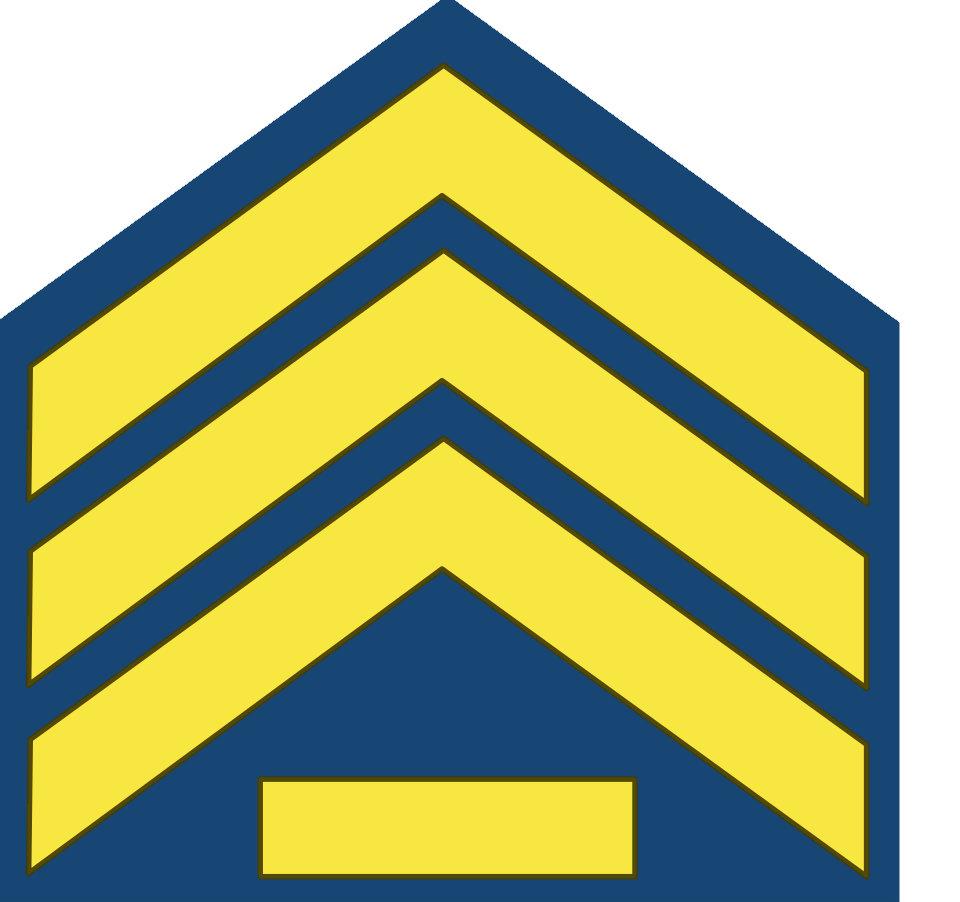
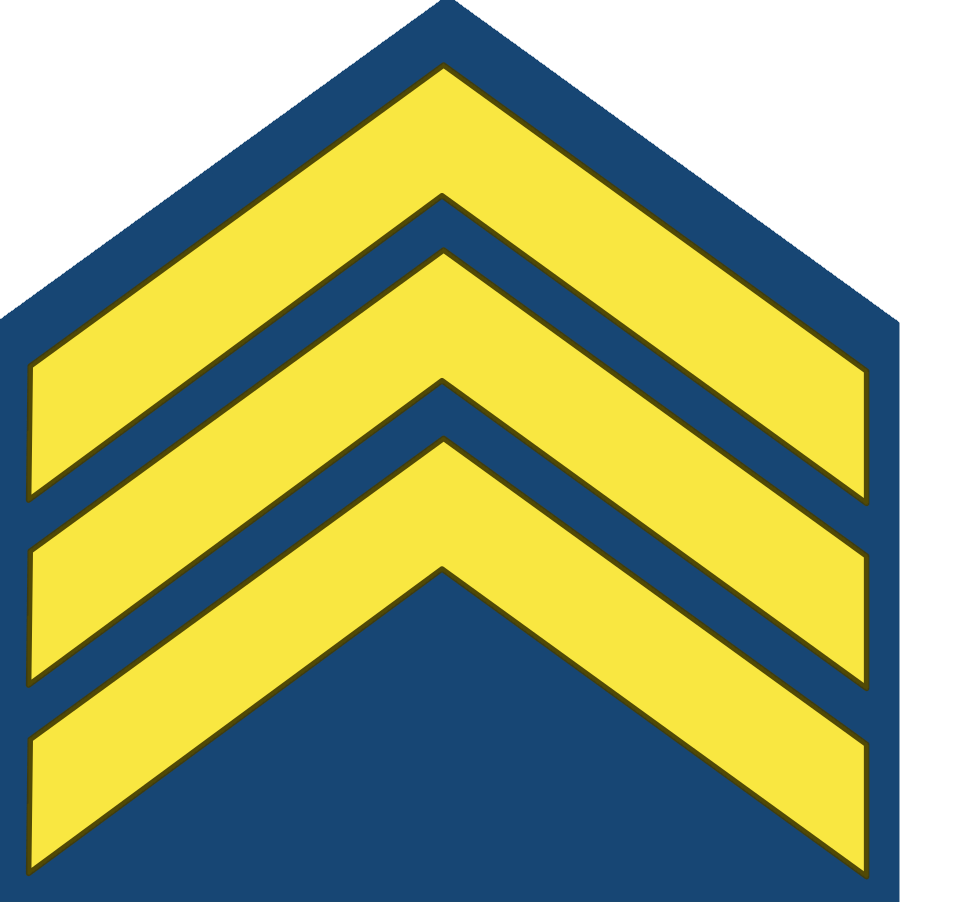
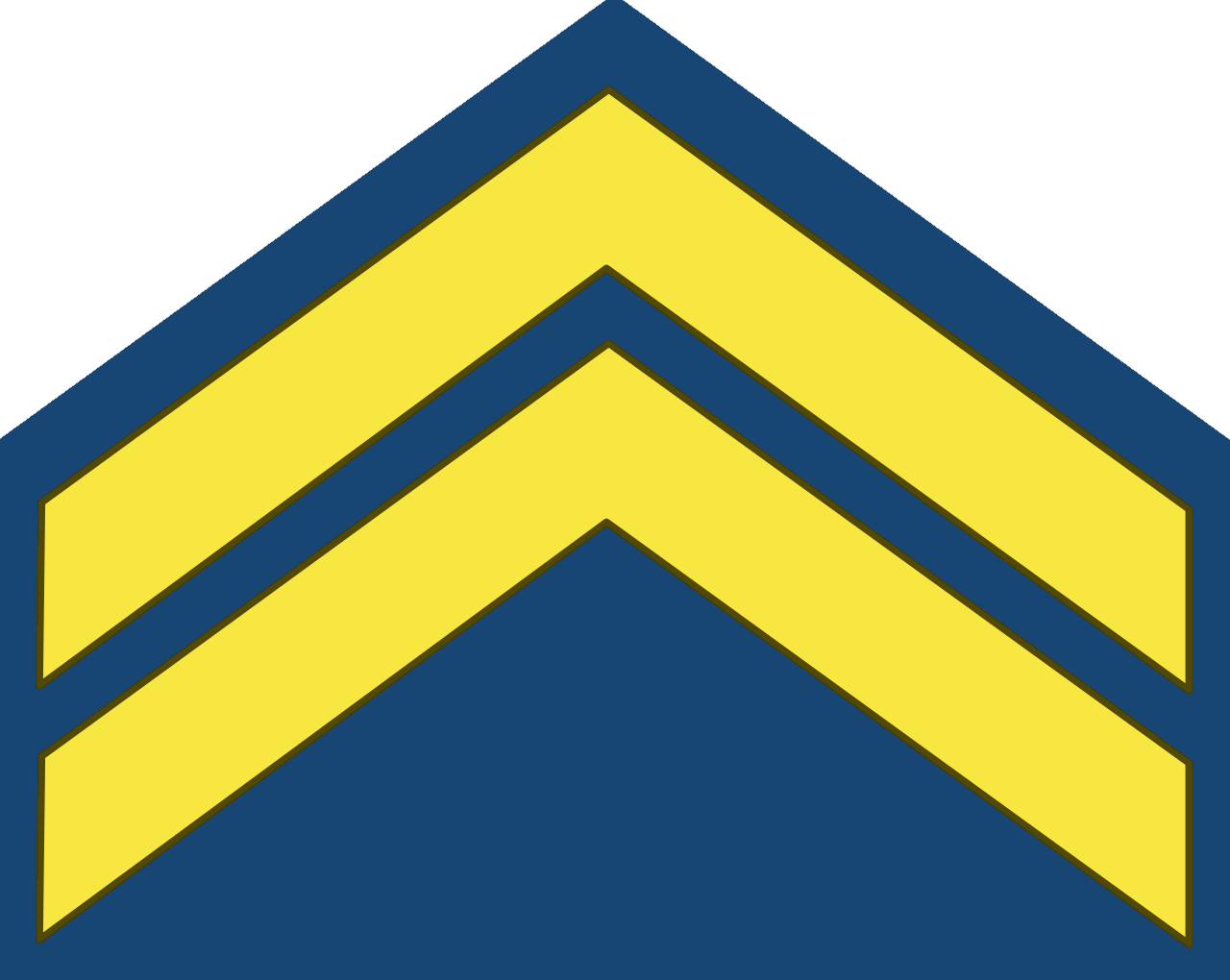
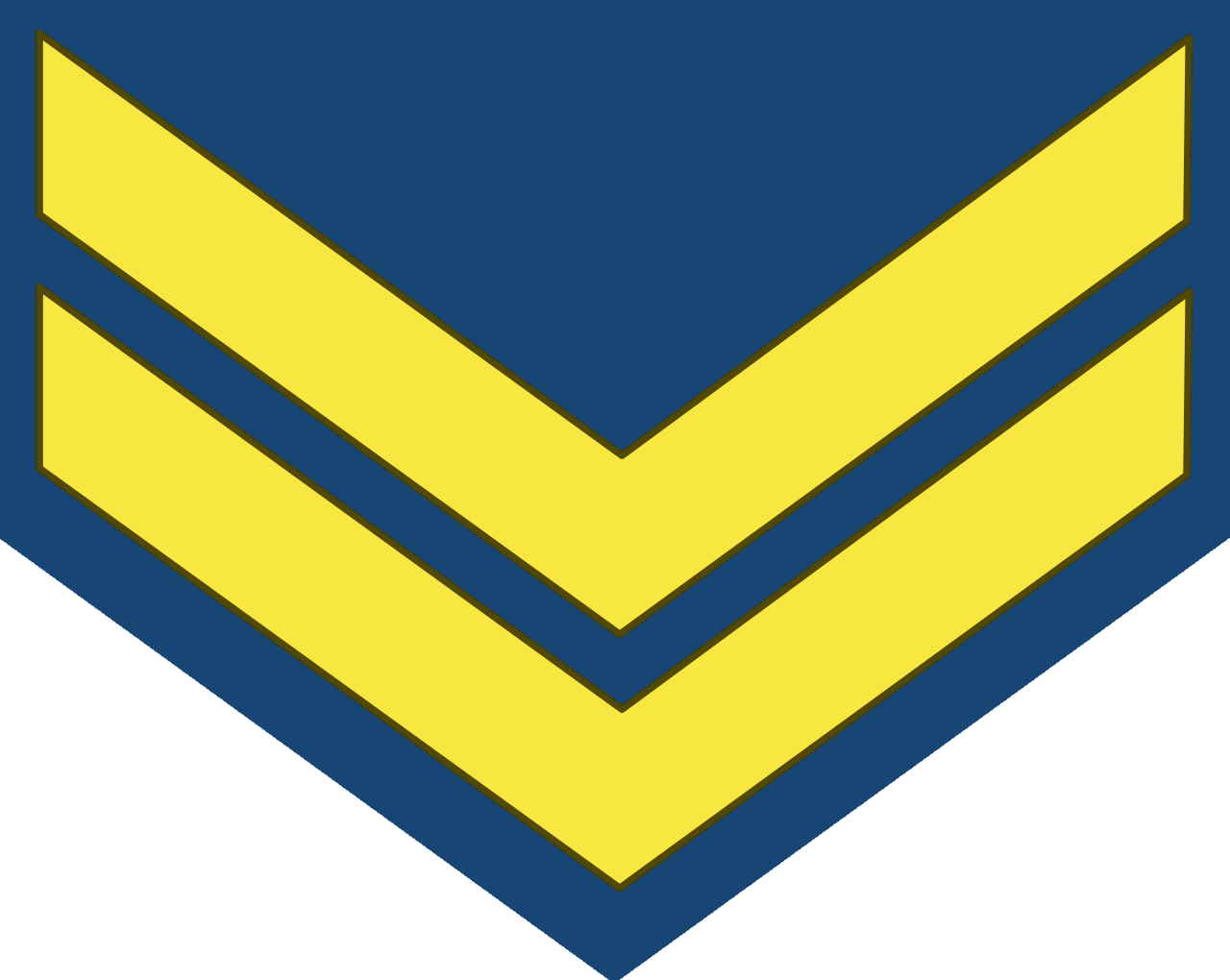
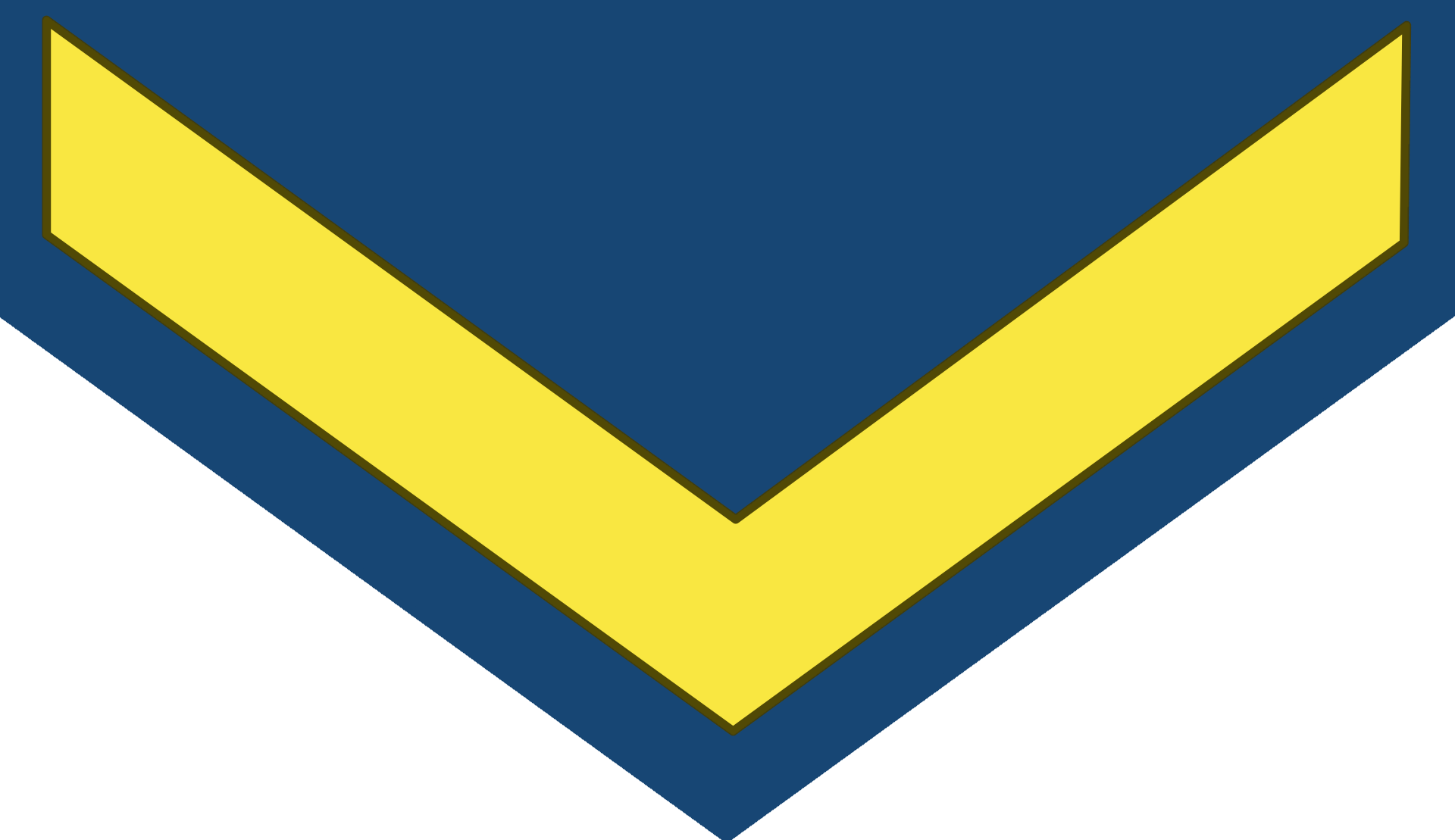
Rank group	Senior NCOs						Junior NCOs	Enlisted
Syrian Air Force									No insignia
Syrian Air Force	مساعد أول; Musaeid 'awal	مساعد ثاني; Musaeid thani	مساعد; Musaeid	رقيب أول; Raqib 'awal	رقيب ثاني; Raqib thani	رقيب; Raqīb	عريف; Earif	جندي أول; Jundiun 'awal	جندي; Jundiun

== Markings ==
It consists of three concentric circles, with a green outer part, white middle and black inner part. The unique part of the Syrian roundel is the presence of three red stars in the white circle, which is reflective of the three stars on the national flag. The fin flash is also an image of the flag.

(1948–1958)

(1958–1961)

(1961–1963)

(1963–1972)

(1972–1980)

(1980–2024)

(2024–Present)

== See also ==
- Air Force Intelligence Directorate

== Bibliography ==
- Cooper, Tom (July–August 2002). "'Floggers" in Action: Early MiG-23s in Operational Service". Air Enthusiast. No. 100. pp. 56–67. ISSN 0143-5450.
- Cooper, Tom (2018a). MiG-23 Flogger in the Middle East: Mikoyan i Gurevich MiG-23 in Service in Algeria, Egypt, Iraq, Libya and Syria, 1973–2008. Helion & Co. ISBN 978-1-912390-32-8.
- Cooper, Tom (2018b). Moscow's Game of Poker: Russian Military Intervention in Syria, 2015-2017. Helion & Co. ISBN 978-1-912390-37-3.
- Cooper, Tom (October 2014). "A NEW AIR WAR OVER SYRIA". Combat Aircraft Magazine (10). Ian Allan Publishing.
- Cooper, Tom (2015). Syrian Conflagration: the Civil War, 2011–2013. Helion & Co. ISBN 978-1-910294-10-9.
- Cooper, Tom; Nicolle, David (2009). Arab MiGs, Volume 1. Harpia Publishing. ISBN 978-0-9825539-2-3.
- Cooper, Tom; Nicolle, David (2011). Arab MiGs, Volume 2. Harpia Publishing. ISBN 978-0-9825539-6-1.
- Cooper, Tom; Nicolle, David (2012). Arab MiGs, Volume 3. Harpia Publishing. ISBN 978-0-9825539-9-2.
- Cooper, Tom; Nicolle, David (2013). Arab MiGs, Volume 4. Harpia Publishing. ISBN 978-0-9854554-1-5.
- Cooper, Tom; Nicolle, David (2014). Arab MiGs, Volume 5. Harpia Publishing. ISBN 978-0-9854554-4-6.
- Cooper, Tom; Nicolle, David (2015). Arab MiGs, Volume 6. Harpia Publishing. ISBN 978-0-9854554-6-0.
- Dijkshoorn, Marco (September 2010). "Syria's Secret Air Arm". Combat Aircraft Magazine. 11 (9). Ian Allan Publishing.
- International Institute for Strategic Studies (23 February 2026). "Chapter Six: Middle East and North Africa". The Military Balance. 126 (1). Taylor & Francis: 322–389. doi:10.1080/04597222.2026.2608520. ISSN 0459-7222.
- Nicolle, David. "Arab-Italian Fighters: Fiats and Macchis in Egyptian and Syrian Service 1948–1956". Air Enthusiast, No. 55, Autumn 1994, pp. 32–36. ISSN 0143-5450
