= Issam Hallaq =

Syrian general

Major General Issam Hallaq
- عصام حلاق
- Military career
- Allegiance: Ba'athist Syria
- Branch: Syrian Arab Air Force
- Service years: ?–2023
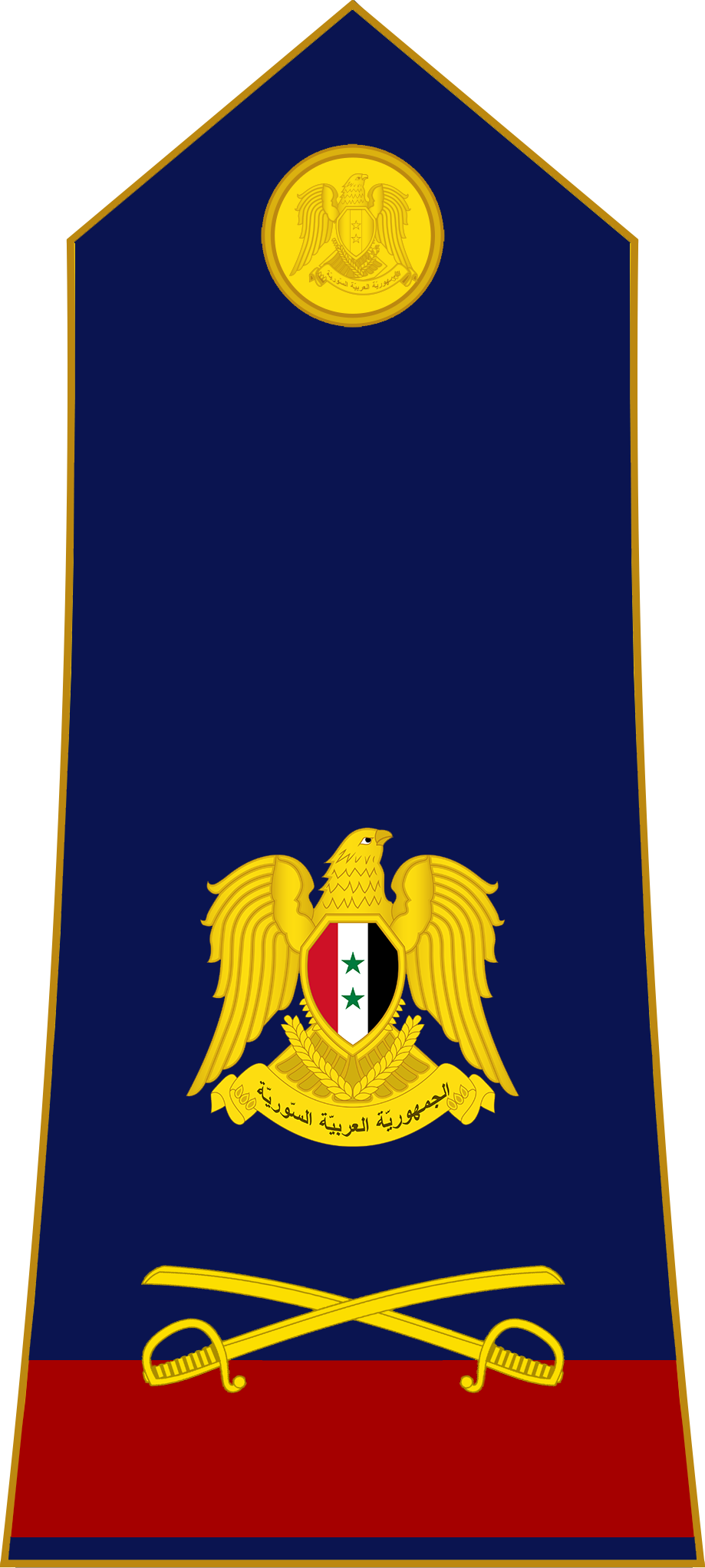
- Rank: Major General
- Commands: Chief of Air Force Staff
- Conflicts: Syrian Civil War; War in Iraq (2013–2017); Northern Iraq offensive

Issam Hallaq (Arabic: عصام حلاق) is a senior Syrian Military Commander and former Chief of Air Force Staff during the Syrian Civil War.

Hallaq had overall responsibility to the Chief of the General Staff for operations and activities of the Air Force. His tenure was met with the widespread use of barrel bombs.
