= Issam (name) =

Issam Arabic: عصام is an Arabic masculine given name.

== List of persons with the given name ==
- Issam (rapper) (born 1993), Moroccan rapper
- Issam Abdallah (1986–2023) was a Lebanese video journalist
- Issam Abdulhadi (1928–2013), Palestinian women's rights activist
- Issam Abuanza, Islamic State politician from Palestine
- Issam El Adoua (born 1986), Moroccan footballer
- Issam Alim, member of al-Jihad
- Issam Alnajjar (born 2003), Jordanian musician and actor
- Issam Amira, Palestinian Islamic scholar and preacher
- Issam Ammour (born 1993), German bobsledder
- Issam Asinga (born 2004), Surinamese track and field sprinter
- Issam al-Attar (1927–2024), Syrian dissident politician and Islamic preacher
- Issam Awarke (born 1960), Lebanese wrestler
- Issam Badda (born 1983), Moroccan footballer
- Issam Bagdi (born 1955), Syrian politician
- Issam Baouz (born 1990), Algerian footballer
- Issam Barhoumi (born 1978), Tunisian kickboxer
- Issam Bassou (born 1998), Moroccan judoka
- Issam Al-Chalabi (1942–2025), Iraqi politician
- Issam Chaouali (born 1970), Tunisian journalist and sports commentator
- Issam Chebake (born 1989), Moroccan footballer
- Issam Chernoubi (born 1987), Moroccan taekwondo practitioner
- Issam John Darwich (born 1945), Syrian archbishop
- Issam Al-Edrissi (born 1984), Lebanese footballer
- Issam Erraki (born 1981), Moroccan professional footballer
- Issam Fares (born 1937), Lebanese businessman and politician
- Issam Hajali, Lebanese musician
- Issam Hallaq, Syrian military commander
- Issam Hamel (born 1997), Algerian rugby union player
- Issam Abu Jamra (born 1937), Lebanese military officer and politician
- Issam Jebali (born 1991), Tunisian footballer
- Issam Jellali (born 1981), Tunisian tennis player
- Issam Jemâa (born 1984), Tunisian footballer
- Issam Ben Khémis (born 1996), Tunisian footballer
- Issam Lahyani, Tunisian handball coach
- Issam El Maach (born 2001), Moroccan footballer
- Issam Mahfouz (1939–2006), Lebanese playwright, poet, and author
- Issam Mahrous, Syrian footballer
- Issam Ahmad Dibwan al-Makhlafi (born 1977), Yemeni member of al-Qaeda
- Issam Makhoul (1952–2025), Israeli Arab politician
- Issam Merdassi (born 1981), Tunisian footballer
- Issam Naaman (born 1942), Lebanese lawyer, politician and author
- Issam Nassar, Palestinian historian
- Issam Nima (born 1979), Algerian long jumper
- Issam Rafea (born 1971), Syrian musician, music director and composer
- Issam Rajji (1944–2001), Lebanese singer
- Issam Al-Sabhi (born 1997), Omani footballer
- Issam al-Said (1938–1988), Iraqi painter, printmaker and architect
- Issam Sartawi (1935–1983), Palestinian cardiologist and politician
- Issam Shaitit (born 2000), Moroccan footballer
- Issam Fayel Al-Sinani (born 1984), Omani footballer
- Issam Haitham Taweel (born 1989), Egyptian tennis player
- Issam Tej (born 1979), Tunisian handball player
- Issam Tombakji (born 1960), Syrian judoka
- Issam Al Yamani, Palestinian refugee
- Issam Zahreddine (1961–2017), Syrian military officer
- Issam Al Zaim (1940–2007), Syrian economist and politician
- Issam al-Khalif (born 1981), Syrian jurist and academic

== Fictional characters ==
- Izzy, one of the titular characters of Ben & Izzy, a Jordanian animated television series

== See also ==
- Isam (name)
- Essam
