= Essam =

Essam (Arabic: عِصام ‘iṣām) is an Arabic male given name and surname. It means "defended; protected; well-preserved; well-protected; well-kept; preserved; reserved; safeguarded".

== Surname ==
Notable people with the surname Essam include:

- Anne Essam (born 1992). Cameroonian handball player
- Chloe Essam (born 1999), English netball player
- Connor Essam (born 1992), English footballer
- Fahad Essam (born 1988), Saudi football player
- Habiba Essam (born 2007), Egyptian footballer
- Mohamed Essam (fencer) (born 1994), Egyptian fencer
- Mohamed Essam (Egyptian footballer) (born 1994), Egyptian footballer
- Mostafa Essam (born 2003), Qatari footballer
- Orjuan Essam, Sudanese footballer
- Ramy Essam (born 1987), Egyptian musician
- Sarah Essam (born 1999), Egyptian footballer
- Shehab Essam (born 1995), Egyptian squash player

== Given name ==
Notable people with the given name Essam include:

- Essam Abdel-Azim (born 1970), Egyptian footballer
- Essam Abdel-Fatah (born 1965), Egyptian football referee
- Essam Awad (born 1962), Egyptian volleyball player
- Essam Baheeg (1931–2008), Egyptian football player and coach
- Essam al-Buwaydhani (born 1971), Syrian rebel leader
- Essam al-Da'alis (1966–2025), Palestinian politician and Hamas member
- Essam Dhahi (born 1983), Emirati footballer
- Essam el-Erian (1954–2020), Egyptian physician and politician
- Essam El-Gindy (born 1966), Egyptian chess Grandmaster
- Essam El Hadary (born 1973), Egyptian footballer
- Essam El-Haddad (1953), Egyptian politician
- Essam Heggy (born 1975), Egyptian space scientist
- Essam Khalaf, Bahraini politician
- Essam E. Khalil (born 1948), Egyptian engineer and academic
- Essam Khalil (politician), Egyptian businessman
- Essam Mahmoud (born 1977), Egyptian football goalkeeper
- Essam Marei (born 1965), Egyptian footballer
- Essam Marzouk (born 1960), Egyptian terrorist
- Essam Mubaideen (born 1986), Jordanian footballer
- Essam al-Qamari, Egyptian army official
- Essam Ramadan (born 1957), Egyptian volleyball player
- Essam al-Ridi, American member of al-Qaeda
- Essam Hamad Salem (born 1973), Iraqi football player and coach
- Essam Sharaf (born 1952), Egyptian academic
- Essam Shiha, Egyptian lawyer, politician and human rights activist
- Essam Tharwat (born 1986), Egyptian footballer
- Essam Abu Touk (born 1977), Jordanian footballer
- Essam Yassin (born 1987), Iraqi footballer
- Essam Yousef (born 1965), Egyptian novelist and TV host
- Essam Zeino, Syrian footballer

== See also ==
- Esam (given name)
- Issam
