= ESAM =

ESAM or Esam may refer to:

- ESAM (gene)
- Esam (given name)
- John Esam, performer at the International Poetry Incarnation, 1965
- Mons Esam, mountain on the moon
- Empire State Aerosciences Museum, in Glenville, New York, United States
- Enfants Solidaires d'Afrique et du Monde, African anti-trafficking group
- Superior School of Agronomy of Mossoró (ESAM), former name of the Federal Rural University of the Semi-arid Region, Brazil
