= Essam Yousef =

Egyptian screenwriter (born 21 October 1965)

Essam Youssef
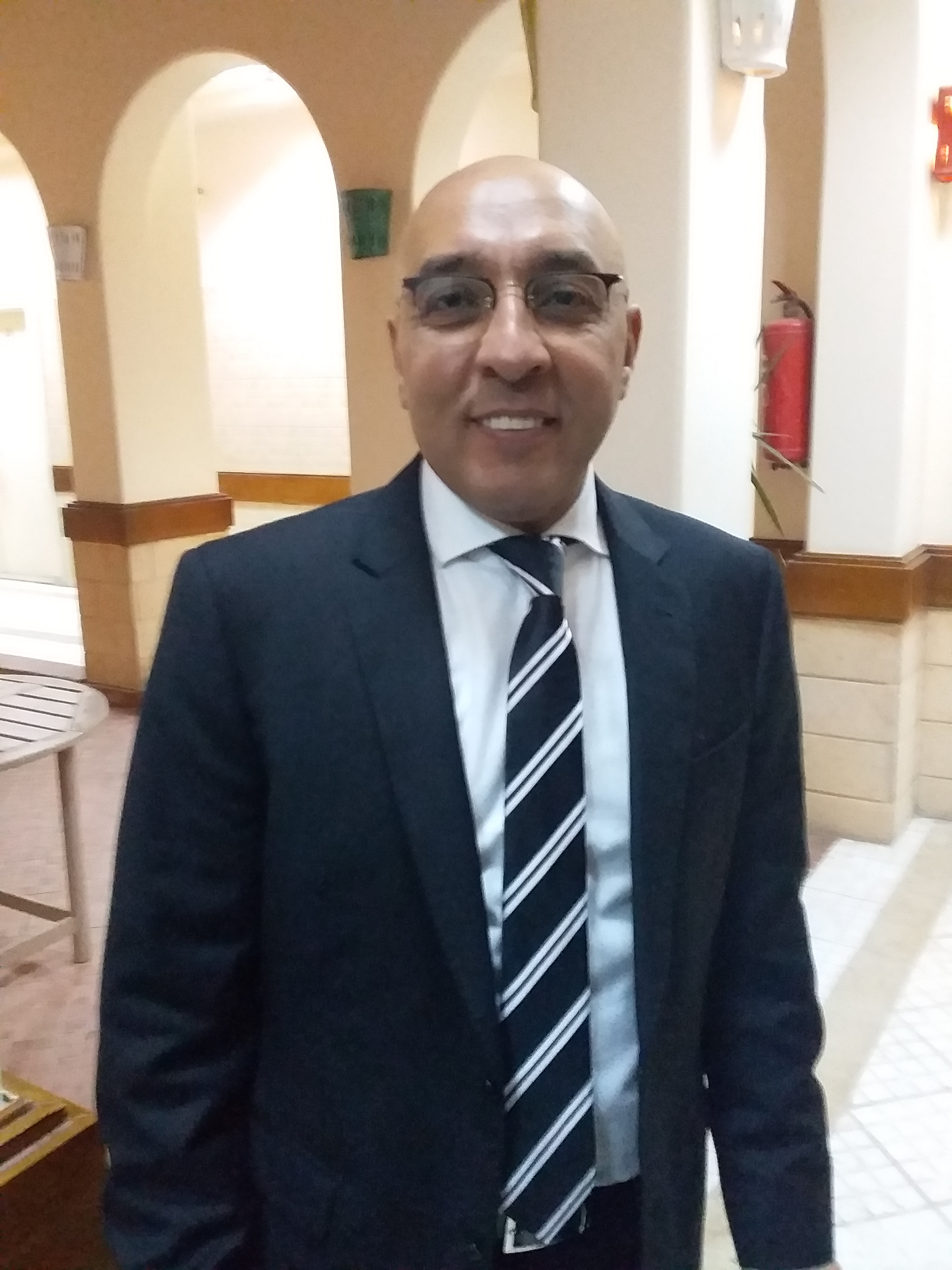
- Born: Essam Abdel Tawab Youssef Ahmed; 21 October 1965 (age 60); Cairo, Egypt
- Occupations: Novelist, screenwriter and TV host
- Children: 3
- Writing career
- Period: 2007–present
- Notable works: A 1/4 Gram, 2 Officers

Essam Youssef (Arabic: عصام يوسف) is an Egyptian novelist and TV host. Born in Cairo, Essam Youssef graduated from Port Said International School in Zamalek. Unleashing a career in literature from an early age, he obtained his BA from the English Department of Language and Literature, Faculty of Arts, Cairo University. His early found passion in raising awareness against drug abuse led him to adopt the practice of helping youth overcome their dependence on illegal substance. This has led him to acquire a duly given position as a member of Mentor Arabia (an organization belonging to the worldwide organization Mentor founded by Queen Silvia of Sweden) since 2009. Taking his message to heart, Essam Youssef visited more than 2000 schools, universities and culture centers all over Egypt since 2007. He set out to many of Egypt's governorates such as Cairo, Giza, Alexandria, Ismailia, Menoufia, Dakahlia, El Beheira, El Gharbia, Beni Suef, El Minya, Assuit, Red Sea and Luxor, and gave talks to over 200 thousand students on drug addiction.

== Career ==
Marking the first step of his writing career, he created his first realistic novel A ¼ Gram, which was published in 2008 and translated into English in 2009. This novel gained wide popularity instantaneously and was soon known for achieving an audience of over 1 million readers. With copies of his best-selling novel printed over 50 times, A ¼ Gram was the new center of attention in respect to the history of Arab novels. In May 2009, Essam Youssef was chosen as UNFPA Youth Ambassador in Egypt for his ongoing efforts in supporting youth by means of his most recent various projects and activities. During that same year, he also became a member of the Egyptian Writer's League/Union.

Essam Youssef is the first Egyptian novelist to win the King Abdullah Award II for Youth Innovation and Achievement for A ¼ Gram (2019/2020). He also received several renowned awards from Egypt, Saudi Arabia, Kuwait, UAE, Jordan, and Lebanon.

He proceeded to accomplish streaks in his career by his writing of the storyline, scenario, and dialogue of Roundtrip. This series was awarded “Best (Arab) Series”, starred by Ahmed El Sakka and Ingy El Mokadem, and aired in Ramadan of 2009. In 2013, Essam Youssef published his second novel Two Officers which gained much appeal from his readers all over the Arab world and was a best-seller for two consecutive years.

In continuation of his quest to help and guide youth, Essam Youssef created Al Abakera (The Geniuses) (Arabic: العباقرة) in 2016. He began his career as a TV host for his own show aired on Al Kahera Wal Nas. Al Abakera is the first Egyptian edutainment show aiming to influence and inspire youth and families all over the country. On airing over 20 seasons, Al Abakera has succeeded in capturing the hearts of millions of fans in Egypt and the Arab nation. After winning the Effie Award in November 2019, Al Abakera became the first Egyptian/Arab/African show to accomplish such a feat. It has also won an award in terms of being the best TV program for three consecutive years (2018, 2019, and 2020).

Starting January 2020, Essam Youssef began hosting the radio program: Al Qarar (The Decision) (Arabic: القرار) aired on Nogoum FM, in which he strived to guide youth in overcoming the challenges of making life-changing decisions.

== Works ==
- A 1/4 Gram (original title: rub' gram), 2008.
- 2 Officers (original title: 2 du'bat), 2013.
- The story and the screenplay of the series Roundtrip (original title: thahab wa aw'da), 2015.

== Upbringing ==
Essam Youssef was born into a family with rich literary background. His father Abdul-Tawab Yossef came to be known as “The Pioneer of Children’s Literature and Culture in the Arab World” for writing over 1,000 books for children. His mother Notaila Rashed (Mama Loubna) was the former 45 year editor-in-chief of Samir Magazine and Crescent Books for Children.
