= Fahmi al-Jowder =

Bahraini politician

H.E. Fahmi bin Ali Al Jowder
- فهمي بن علي الجودر
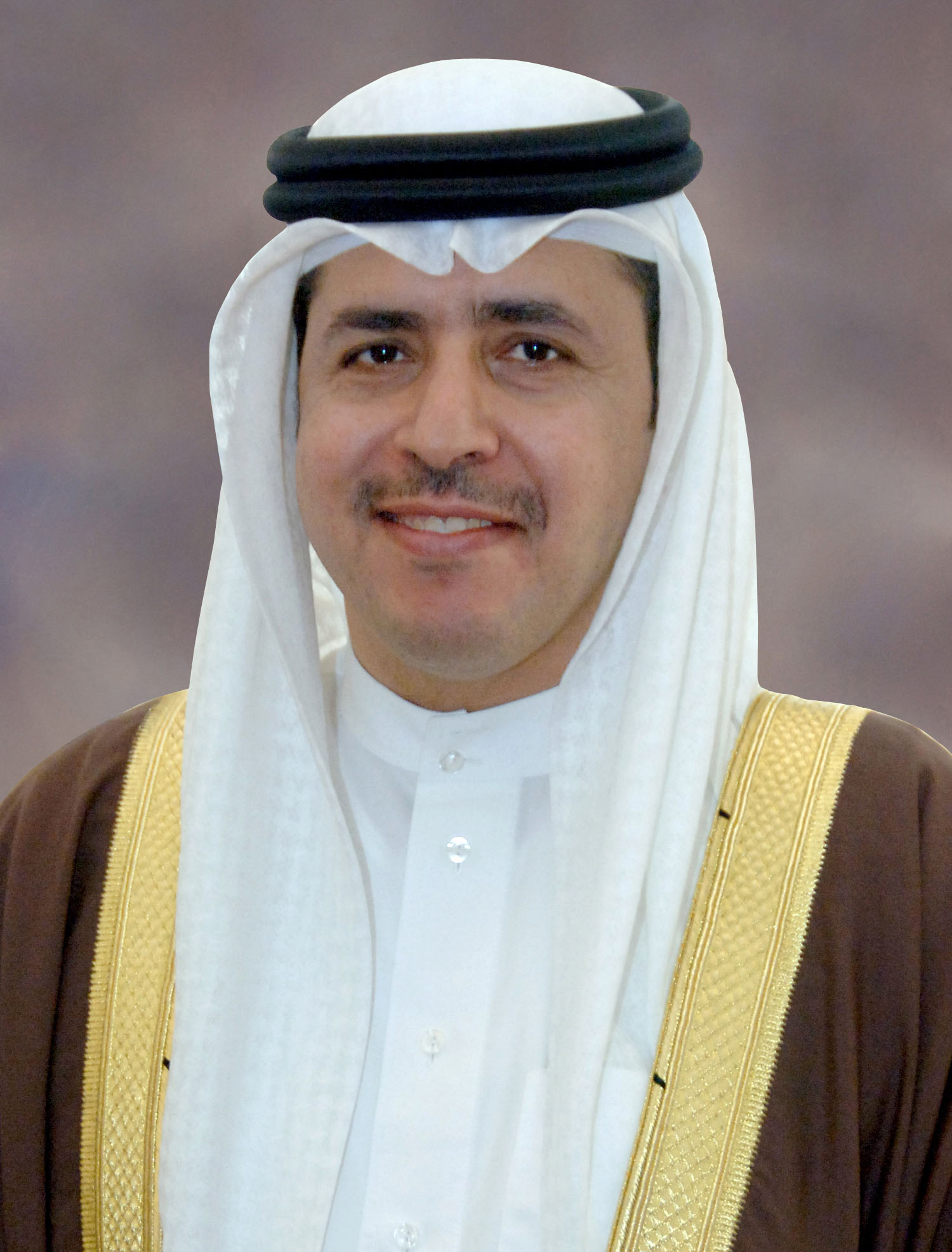
- In office 2001–2011
- Minister: Ministry of Works, Housing and Electricity and Water (3)
- Succeeded by: Essam bin Abdulla Khalaf

Personal details
- Born: 26 April 1964 (age 61)
- Spouse: Basma Yusuf Al Ali (m. 1996)
- Children: 2

Fahmi bin Ali Al Jowder (Arabic: فهمي بن علي الجودر) is a Bahraini politician.

== Career ==
Jowder served as the Minister of works and public housing in Bahrain from 2001 to 2011. He was appointed minister for electricity and water affairs in November 2010. His qualifications include a Master of Science degree from George Washington University (MSc).
