= ISAM (disambiguation) =

ISAM or Isam may refer to:

== Technology ==
- ISAM, the IBM mainframe indexed sequential access method
- C-ISAM, a C language application programming interface
- MyISAM, a storage engine for MySQL
- ISAM (spaceflight), a spaceflight technology process (In-space Servicing, Assembly, and Manufacturing)

== People ==
- Isam (name), list of people with the name
- Banu Isam, a former Berber Muslim dynasty

== Organizations ==
- Institute for Sales and Account Management
- International Society of Addiction Medicine
- Hitchcock Institute for the Study of American Music at Brooklyn College
- International Society for Aerosols in Medicine

== Others ==
- ISAM (album), an album by musician Amon Tobin
- The Iraqi Security Assistance mission, part of the Multi-National Security Transition Command – Iraq
