= Samir (magazine) =

Egyptian children's magazine

Samir Magazine
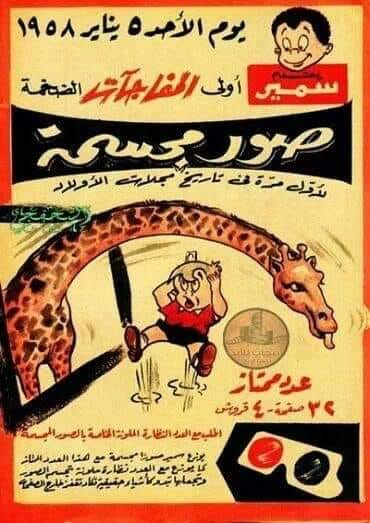
- Poster for the magazine
- Editor: Nadia Nash'at (1956 – 1966); Notaila Rashed (1966 – 2002)
- Categories: Comedy, Humor, education
- Frequency: Weekly
- Publisher: Dar al-hilal
- First issue: April 15, 1956
- Country: Egypt
- Language: Arabic

Samir magazine is a pioneering Egyptian children's weekly magazine published by Dar Al-Hilal since 1956. It presents itself as being "for ages 8 to 88." Nadia Nash'at, granddaughter of the founder of Dar Al-Hilal, served as its editor-in-chief from its inception until her departure for Lebanon in 1966. She was succeeded by her deputy, Nutila Ibrahim Rashid ("Mama Lubna"), until 2002. During this period, Jamila Kamel briefly held the position in the 1970s. The first issue of Samir magazine was published on April 15, 1956, by Dar Al-Hilal. It contained 16 large-format colored pages and cost two piasters. The number of pages was then increased to 24, and the price was half a piaster with issue number 52 at the end of the first year of the magazine. The magazine is renowned for introducing several comic book series to the Arabic language for the first time, including Tintin, Nadia (based on the British comic Vicky), Tarzan, Popeye and Bugs Bunny, and Disney characters that appeared in special issues in 1958 prior to the founding of Dar Al-Hilal's Mickey Magazine. It also featured locally produced comics such as Samir and Tahta, Basil the Brave Scout, Bobby, Basbas, and Master Falih. Local illustrators like Bahija (Giga Toumassian) and international artists like Berni from France and Hirant "Haroun" from Armenia contributed to some of its issues.
