= FIFA 12 =

2011 association football video game

- British and Irish cover featuring Manchester United's Wayne Rooney and Arsenal's Jack Wilshere
- Developer: EA Canada (Note: Ported to Mac OS X by TransGaming.)
- Publisher: EA Sports
- Producers: David Rutter; Kaz Makita
- Series: FIFA
- Platforms: PC: Microsoft Windows OS X; Consoles: PlayStation 2 PlayStation 3 Xbox 360 Wii; Handheld: PlayStation Portable Nintendo 3DS PlayStation Vita; Mobile: iOS Android Java ME Xperia Play
- Release: NA: September 27, 2011; AU: September 29, 2011; EU: September 30, 2011
- Genre: Sports
- Modes: Single-player, multiplayer

FIFA 12 (titled FIFA Soccer 12 in North America) is a football simulation video game developed by EA Canada and published by Electronic Arts worldwide under the EA Sports label. It was released in September 2011 on consoles for PlayStation 2, PlayStation 3, Xbox 360 and Wii; on handhelds for PlayStation Portable, Nintendo 3DS, Xperia Play, Android and iOS; and on computers for Microsoft Windows and Mac OS X. A port of the game entitled FIFA Football (FIFA Soccer in North America) was released as a launch title for the PlayStation Vita.

David Rutter, the line producer for FIFA 12, promised "a revolutionary year for FIFA ... especially in the gameplay department."

In the United Kingdom, an "Ultimate Edition" of the game was available at Game and Gamestation stores. It included four monthly Ultimate Team gold packs, with each pack containing 12 items, including players, contracts, stadiums, managers, staff, fitness, healing, footballs, kits and badges. Each pack contains one rare item, such as enhanced player attributes, longer contracts and the most coveted players. On 22 June 2011, EA Sports announced that the Microsoft Windows version of FIFA 12 will have the same engine, features, and competitions as the PlayStation 3 and Xbox 360 versions.

Along with several other new EA Sports titles, FIFA 12 was available three days early to purchasers of the EA Sports Season Ticket.

The release date of the FIFA 12 demo was announced at the Gamescom event in Germany on 16 August 2011; the demo was available from Xbox Live Marketplace and EA's Origin Store for Microsoft Windows on 13 September 2011.

== Gameplay ==
FIFA 12 introduced three major gameplay changes: the Impact Engine, Tactical Defending, and Precision Dribbling.

In development for several years, the Impact Engine improves collision variety, accuracy, and momentum preservation. A new advanced procedural animation system is used along with collision physics to produce different results depending on the players and physical forces involved. This affects all players, so even those off the ball may have collisions. The Impact Engine has been cited as a game-changer, making FIFA 12 less structured and synthetic than its predecessors, and has been described by producer David Rutter as the biggest technological change to the series since the transition to the current generation of consoles. The Impact Engine also directly affects injuries sustained by players during a match.

The new Tactical Defending system aims to change the approach to defending by placing equal importance on positioning, intercepting passes and tackling. When defending there will be more of an emphasis on slowing attackers down and containing them, and pressuring them into making mistakes. This is intended to be a more manual form of defending, requiring greater timing and precision when compared to the defensive "press" system used in previous FIFA games. The old system, now dubbed "legacy defending", where a button press causes an AI player to home in on the player in possession of the ball, can still be used offline, and in online friendlies and custom unranked matches.

The Precision Dribbling feature allows players to dribble whilst shielding, meaning that the player can still move around the pitch whilst holding players off, rather than being rooted to the spot. Close control has been added below jogging as a way of allowing players to take smaller, more frequent touches, keeping the ball closer and keeping tighter control. Players will now be much more aware of their surroundings. As an example, players in possession near the touchline will understand their position, and keep tighter control of the ball to stop it running out of play.

An improved artificial intelligence system named Pro Player Intelligence aims to make AI-controlled players react to the skills and capabilities of other players with appropriate actions. For example, a winger will be more likely to cross the ball into the box when he has a waiting teammate with aerial ability, whereas he might look for support and play the ball along the ground if that teammate is less of an aerial threat. Players will also make better use of their own strengths, so for example a creative player might look for less obvious opportunities such as playing long accurate passes, where another player in his situation would be more likely to play it safe with a short pass.

Match presentation has also been overhauled with a new default camera angle and improvements to the broadcast-style match build-up. Some in-game cutscenes have been removed, such as those before throw-ins and corner kicks. Instead, a player will simply run to perform the task in question with no interruption.

== Career mode ==
The manager's relationship with players and the media will play a larger role, and with team selection, success, and salaries all affecting individual players' attitudes and morale, and the press picking up on injuries and unrest, all of which can impact performance on the pitch. Unhappy players can talk to the press and stir up interest from other clubs, with transfer AI also having been improved upon. Transfer targets will sometimes demand excessive wages if they think they can get away with it, and rival clubs will attempt to steal players away for a bargain price. Each club will be assigned a particular transfer mentality, where the richest clubs will tend to concentrate on acquiring the very best players available, whereas smaller clubs may look more for youngsters, older players, and loans. The AI will fine-tune this element to prevent it becoming too predictable. The transfer window has been overhauled, with the last day being slowed down to progress on hours rather than days and featuring a ticking countdown clock as clubs hurry to complete last-minute deals. It will be possible to delay transfers until right up to the deadline in order to see how others pan out, and the club's Chief Executive will help with pointing out potential late signings. Other improvements to Career Mode include the calendar, news story displays and news feeds, which aim to make information such as upcoming events, transfers, and rumours more accessible. Facebook integration has been implemented.

== Online modes ==
EA claims to have "revolutionized" the online side of FIFA 12. Among the changes is a new mode called "Head to Head Seasons", a variation on regular ranked matches where league points are awarded for winning or drawing matches. The aim is to progress up through ten divisions, with each "season" consisting of ten games. All players will start in the tenth and lowest division, with promotion and relegation based on a target number of points won in each season. Multiplayer matchmaking has been expanded with the addition of the "flow" mode. This involves choosing various options such as team and line-up before being matched with an opponent. This change is intended to counter the problem of being paired with opponents who choose one of a small number of five-star teams, a situation that often results in repetitive matches between the same few clubs. By selecting a team beforehand, an opponent with similar team preferences will automatically be chosen. There is also the option for players who use the "manual" control method, with reduced AI assistance on shots and passes, to choose to be paired against other "manual" users only. The percentage of games an opponent has finished can be specified too, making it easier to avoid "rage quitters".

A new online service called EA Sports Football Club launches simultaneously with FIFA 12, and has been compared to a social network that tracks what players do in the game and awards XP. This will be linked to both friend-based and worldwide leaderboards, and include a levelling system. The player also chooses a particular football club to support which will be apportioned a share of all XP earned, with league tables for clubs based on the average XP contributed by their fans. Each week will count as a "season" with clubs being promoted or relegated based on the skill of those who support them. EA Sports Football Club will in future connect play across multiple titles, starting with FIFA 12 and the forthcoming FIFA Street. By playing both games, XP earned in one will be carried over to the other.

=== National teams ===
FIFA 12 has 42 national teams in its international division. Five new teams are added to the list, while Czech Republic, China PR and Paraguay were removed from the game. Ukraine is not present in the base game but was later introduced as a part of the UEFA Euro 2012 DLC.

== UEFA Euro 2012 ==
UEFA Euro 2012 was released as an add-on for FIFA 12 on 24 April 2012. Unlike previous Euro games, it is a downloadable expansion pack for FIFA 12, requiring the game and internet connection. It was released on 24 April 2012.

The expansion features an all-new game mode, Expedition Mode (similar to World Tour mode from FIFA Street), where players create a customized team to bid against the European nations. Players can import their Virtual Pro into the mode. The Story of the Finals scenario mode from 2010 FIFA World Cup South Africa returns in a form similar to normal FIFA 12 Football Club scenarios.

The DLC includes all 53 UEFA-member nations, although 24 of them are unlicensed, including co-hosts Ukraine and Poland. One user can play through the UEFA Euro 2012 finals.

Following numerous customer complaints, a new update was released by EA which fixed many of the issues, including the constant freezing.

== Stadiums ==
There are 56 stadiums in FIFA 12. Most are from Europe's most prominent leagues, and a range of generic stadia. In FIFA 12 there are new real stadiums: Manchester City's Etihad Stadium, Juventus Stadium and the Vancouver Whitecaps' BC Place Stadium.

All 8 official stadiums of the tournament are included in the DLC.

== Commentators ==
Martin Tyler returns as the main commentator, with former Arsenal and England player Alan Smith as co-commentator. Smith replaces long-term FIFA contributor Andy Gray following the controversy surrounding him earlier in 2011 and his subsequent dismissal from the Sky Sports commentary team. FIFA 12 producer David Rutter described Smith as "one of the top-tier broadcasters on the UK football scene, [who will bring] a fresh, new perspective and insight ... working alongside the trusted and well-known voice of Martin Tyler". A second English commentary team will be included in the form of ITV's Clive Tyldesley and Andy Townsend, who will be used for tournament modes, though they can also be set as the default commentators. They were also in the PS2 version of the game.

FIFA 12 was the first in the series to be released in Arabic, with Issam Chaouali and Abdullah Mubarak Al-Harby providing the commentary.

== Covers ==
As with previous FIFA games, a number of different national covers are used. Most of them depict either Manchester United and England striker Wayne Rooney, or Real Madrid's Brazilian international Kaká, along with one or two other players, often from the country in question. In the UK and Ireland, Jack Wilshere of Arsenal and England is featured alongside Rooney, while Everton's Australian midfielder Tim Cahill partners Rooney and Kaká on both the Australian and Asian covers. Rooney appears for the first time on the North American cover along with LA Galaxy forward Landon Donovan and Rafael Márquez of New York Red Bulls.

The French cover features Rooney alongside French stars Karim Benzema and Philippe Mexès, while the German cover only features two Germans: Mats Hummels of Borussia Dortmund and 1. FC Köln's Lukas Podolski. The Hungarian cover features Rooney alongside Balázs Dzsudzsák. In Italy, Giampaolo Pazzini, Philippe Mexès and Wayne Rooney are featured on the cover. Finally, in Spain Xabi Alonso and Gerard Piqué are featured, while in Poland Jakub Błaszczykowski alongside Kaká. Covers are also available to download from the internet, for example, a fan could go to search for their preferred club and download that cover. The cover players are also utilised in the FIFA 12 advertising campaigns, and other promotional and social media activities worldwide. EA spokesman Matt Bilbey claimed that the chosen players all "passionately play our game" and will be talking to fans about their own experiences with FIFA.

== Sponsorship and promotions ==
As part of their promotion of FIFA 12, EA Sports have signed a deal with English Premier League club Manchester City that was described as "unprecedented in both its scale and scope within the computer game industry". The deal will involve content distributed through the digital channels of both the club and EA, including "match simulations" before the actual fixtures and "unique visuals of the City stars in action", as well as a "virtual kit launch" held on 21 July 2011. EA will be making available a downloadable Manchester City-themed game cover as well as installing gaming areas around the City of Manchester Stadium. The entire first team squad have had their heads scanned in 360 degrees for more accurate in-game representations.

For the third year running, EA Sports co-sponsors English Football League One side Swindon Town, with the FIFA 12 logo featuring on the back of the home shirt and on the front of the away shirt.

== Reception ==
Reception

Aggregate score
Aggregator	Score
Metacritic	90/100 (Xbox 360); 90/100 (PS3)

Review scores
Publication	Score
1Up.com	A
Eurogamer	9/10
Famitsu	39/40
GameTrailers	9.3/10
IGN	9.5/10

Reception (UEFA Euro 2012 DLC)

Aggregate score
Aggregator	Score		
Aggregator	PC	PS3	Xbox 360
Metacritic	64/100	65/100	70/100

Review scores
Publication	Score		
Publication	PC	PS3	Xbox 360
Eurogamer	N/A	N/A	6/10
Game Informer	N/A	6.75/10	6.75/10
GameRevolution	N/A	N/A	3.5/5
GameSpot	N/A	7/10	7/10
Hyper	N/A	5/10	N/A
IGN	6.5/10	6.5/10	6.5/10
PlayStation Official Magazine – UK	N/A	8/10	N/A
Official Xbox Magazine (US)	N/A	N/A	6/10
PC Gamer (UK)	69%	N/A	N/A
VideoGamer.com	N/A	N/A	8/10
The Digital Fix	N/A	6/10	N/A
Digital Spy	N/A	N/A	3/5

FIFA 12 has received critical acclaim with a score of 90 on Metacritic for both the Xbox 360 and PS3 versions. IGN gave the game a 9.5 out of 10 rating. 1UP.com gave it an A score, praising its refinements and new features. Eurogamer gave it a 9 out of 10 rating, calling it a "welcome edition" and "a step forward for the series". Although several errors have been found throughout the career mode such as players disappearing from season to season and being unable to load progress.

The UEFA Euro 2012 expansion pack received "mixed or average reviews" on all platforms according to the review aggregation website Metacritic. While praised for its presentation, it was criticized for its replay value, outdated gameplay, lack of new soundtrack, expensive price tag, gameplay bugs, exclusion of the qualifying rounds, and the lack of known of its predecessors, in particular the decision to not include the 'Captain Your Country' mode which proved extremely popular with consumers. The expansion pack constantly freezes online, often resulting in losses late in online tournament play. Losses like this can even come when a player is leading and the game is officially over.

During the 15th Annual Interactive Achievement Awards, the Academy of Interactive Arts & Sciences awarded FIFA 12 with "Sports Game of the Year".

== Sales ==
FIFA 12 sold 3.2 million copies in its first week of availability, up 23 percent over FIFA 11's performance. This makes it the "fastest selling sports game ever", according to publisher EA. On October 27, 2011, EA reported that FIFA 12 had shipped eight million and sold five million units.

== See also ==
- Pro Evolution Soccer 2012, its competitor football game
