= FIFA Street (2012 video game) =

- Cover art featuring Lionel Messi
- Developer: EA Canada
- Publisher: EA Sports
- Director: Gary Paterson
- Producer: Sid Misra
- Designer: Alle de Voogd
- Series: FIFA Street
- Platforms: PlayStation 3 Xbox 360
- Release: NA: March 13, 2012; EU: March 16, 2012
- Genre: Sports (street football)
- Modes: Single-player, multiplayer

FIFA Street (also known as FIFA Street 4 and FIFA Street 2012) is a street football video game developed by EA Canada and published by EA Sports. It was released in March 2012 for the PlayStation 3 and Xbox 360 consoles. It is the first such game in almost four years, and a reboot for the series. FIFA Street was developed by some of the same team behind FIFA 12, including creative director Gary Paterson, and uses the FIFA 12 game engine. Sid Misra, the line producer for FIFA Street, promised "the first true quality street football experience."

== Gameplay ==
In an effort to make the game more "authentic", the stylised cartoon-like visuals of previous games in the series has been dropped in favour of a more realistic look, though there will still be the same emphasis on skill moves and tricks. The focus is once again on fast-paced games involving small teams of five or six players per side, one-on-one, and game modes based on panna and futsal are also included. As with the previous games in the series, skill moves are an important element of gameplay. FIFA Street features twice as many tricks as are possible in FIFA 12, with much greater variety, and over 50 more than its predecessor FIFA Street 3. Other new features include improved one-touch passing, a feature called Street Ball Control, and a new "ATTACK" dribbling system.

The game features a large number of real life players from 3000 teams of many of the world's biggest leagues, and locations from around the world ranging from the streets of Amsterdam to the beaches of Rio de Janeiro. Each of these arenas attempt to reflect the style of football played in that country. The game is the first game in the series to feature both national and club teams.

== Development ==
This is a reboot of the FIFA Street franchise, so what you know of FIFA Street 1, 2 and 3, you can forget about it. What we really wanted to do is come out with the first truly great street football experience. There hasn't been one yet. FIFA Street 1, 2 and 3 barely tried, they came out kinda good and then a little bit into the experience, people kinda lost interest. So we wanted really to create a game that had that depth that was missing in the games of the past. This is the first game that's going to be built by members of the FIFA team on the FIFA engine… There's no need to go overtly arcade in street football because when you see some of the cool stuff people can do, they already seems arcadey enough, I don't need to jump over someone's shoulders when I can already do some cool stuff with the ball as it is.

— FIFA Street line producer Sid Misra, speaking to GameSpot.

== Promotion and release ==
The game was announced on August 16, 2011 at the Gamescom event in Germany, and was released on the Xbox 360 and PlayStation 3 consoles in March 2012. Along with several other new EA Sports titles, FIFA Street was available early to purchasers of the EA Sports Season Ticket. Lionel Messi features on the cover after EA announced, in November 2011, that he had signed a deal to become the new face of the FIFA franchise. The "Adidas All-Star Team" including 13 of the greatest soccer players in the world and the Lionel Messi Barcelona-themed venue were available as pre-order bonus. A FIFA Street demo was launched on February 28, 2012 on Xbox Live and a day later on PSN. Unlike the previous 3 FIFA Street games, this one does not use the EA Sports BIG branding, and instead uses the standard EA Sports branding. Along with FIFA Street, SSX was also resurrected for a new game.

== Leagues ==
Available leagues:

- (United States) (Canada) Major League Soccer
- (England) Premier League
- (France) Ligue 1
- (Italy) Serie A
- (Germany) Bundesliga
- (Spain) Liga BBVA

== Reception ==
FIFA Street garnered generally positive reviews, and holds an average of 77/100 on aggregate web site Metacritic.
