= Essam Khalaf =

Bahraini politician

H.E. Essam bin Abdulla Khalaf
- عصام بن عبدالله خلف
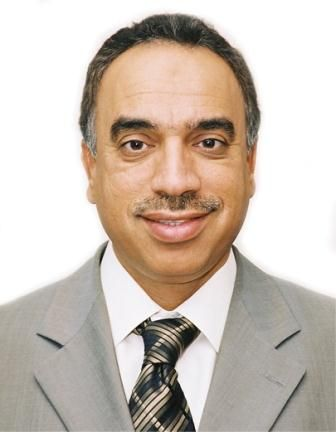
- Incumbent
- Assumed office 2010
- Minister: Ministry of Works, Bahrain
- Preceded by: Fahmi al-Jowder

Essam bin Abdulla Khalaf (Arabic: عصام بن عبدالله خلف) is a Bahraini politician. As the Head of the construction arm of Bahrain's Government, he is the current Minister of Works, Municipalities and Urban Planning. He was previously the Minister of Works, but then the two ministries were joined and he was appointed to hold both.
