= Issam Bagdi =

Syrian politician

Isaam Bogdi

member of the Syrian Parliament
- In office 2003–2007

Personal details
- Born: 1955 (age 70–71) Al Hasakah, Syria
- Party: Syrian Social Nationalist Party
- Occupation: Medical Doctor (Syria)

Issam Yacoub Bagdi is a Syrian politician and a member of the Syrian Social Nationalist Party.
