= Issam Chaouali =

Tunisian sports journalist (born 1970)

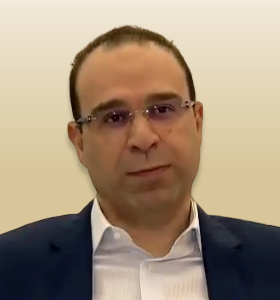
- Issam Chaouali in 2017
- Born: September 25, 1970 (age 56); Tunis, Tunisia
- Occupations: Sports commentator; Journalist
- Years active: 1995–present
- Known for: Sports commentator at beIN Sports MENA

Issam Chaouali (Arabic: عصام الشوالي) born 25 September 1970 in Tunis, Tunisia, is a Tunisian journalist and sports commentator for the Qatari channel beIN Sports MENA since 2009. He is a well-known commentator in the Arab world. He comments on matches in the world, the European and African championships.

== Career ==
After graduating from philology, he started his career in 1995 at Radio Jeunes until he joined the Télévision Tunisienne in 1998. In 2001, he joined the Arabic-language station ART (Arab Radio and Television Network), where he gained great fame. He commented on his first match in 1998 and it was a UEFA Champions League match between Real Madrid and Inter Milan. Currently, like most other leading Arab reporters, he is associated with the beIN Sports MENA.

== Style ==
Chawali is characterized by courage and directness in his commentary. However, it may be difficult for a non-Arabic speaking person to understand. In his statements, he often intertwines words from various languages, especially French, and uses a lot of the Tunisian Arabic. In some situations he is quite eccentric, he can suddenly switch from simple speech to singing.

== Other work ==
Chawali joined the commentary team of FIFA 12, which was the first edition in the series to feature Arabic-language commentary.
