= Fahad Essam =

Saudi football player

Personal information
- Full name: Fahad Essam Sufyan Al-Saoud
- Date of birth: June 9, 1988 (age 38)
- Place of birth: Saudi Arabia
- Height: 1.68 m (5 ft 6 in)
- Position: Winger

Youth career
- Al-Shabab

Senior career*
Years	Team	Apps	(Gls)
2007–2012	Al-Hamadah		
2012–2016	Al-Fateh	5	(1)
2014–2015	→ Al-Diriyah (loan)		
2015–2016	→ Al-Shoalah (loan)		
2016–2017	Al Hazm		
2020–2022	Sajer		
2022–2023	Al-Ula		
2023–2024	Al-Muzahimiyyah		
- * Club domestic league appearances and goals

Fahad Essam (born 9 June 1988) is a Saudi football player who plays as a winger.

== Honours ==
Al-Fateh SC

- Saudi Professional League: 2012–13
- Saudi Super Cup: 2013
