= Issam Abuanza =

Islamic State health minister

Islamic State health minister

Personal details
- Citizenship: United Kingdom

Military service
- Allegiance: Islamic State

Issam Abuanza (Arabic: عصام أبو عنزة) is the former Islamic State health minister of the Islamic State Health Service. A Palestinian with British citizenship, he is the first practicing National Health Service doctor known to have joined the Islamic State group. Concerning the death of Jordanian pilot Muath Al-Kasasbeh, he stated:

I would've liked for them to burn him extremely slowly and I could treat him so we could torch him once more

Abuanza, then living in Sheffield with a wife and two children, travelled to Syria alone in July 2014.
