= Notaila Rashed =

Egyptian children's author and translator

- نتيلة إبراهيم راشد
- Born: September 20, 1934; Cairo, Egypt
- Died: May 26, 2012 (aged 77)
- Education: Cairo University
- Occupations: Writer, translator
- Spouse: Abdul-Tawab Yossef
- Writing career
- Pen name: Mama Lubna
- Language: Arabic
- Notable work: Samir (Magazine)

Notaila Ibrahim Rashed (Arabic: نتيلة إبراهيم راشد; 1934–2012), also known by the nickname Mama Lubna, was an Egyptian children's author and translator. She was considered a pioneer and advocate of Egyptian and Arab children's literature.

For more than 30 years, she worked as the editor-in-chief of the children's magazine, Samir.

== Life and career ==
Rashed was born on 20 September 1934 in Cairo, Egypt to a wealthy family. She studied at Cairo University, where she wrote stories for children. In 1957, she graduated from the university with a bachelors degree in philosophy and sociology. Starting in the 1950s, her literary work was adapted for use in multiple outlets, including radio and television.

Alongside Nādyah Našʾat in 1956, she helped found Samir, an Egyptian children's and educational magazine. The magazine became the most popular children's magazine in Egypt during its time, and Rashed later became its editor-in-chief. Under her direction, the magazine began to deal with political issues such as socialism. She left as the head of the publication in 1966, when she then became the chief editor of children's books at Samir's parent company, the Egyptian publishing house Dar al-Hilal. She returned as editor-in-chief of Samir in 1971, staying in that role for around 30 years, until 2002.

In 1979, her work The Diary of Yasser Family was published. Her story within that work titled "The Doll" was adapted into the first children's film produced by the Egyptian National Council of Culture.

In addition to her writing, Rashed translated works from English into Arabic. Some of her children's books were also translated into English. Her work largely focused on ancient and modern Egyptian culture, and she was an advocate for Arab and Egyptian children's literature.

== Death ==
After a short illness, Rashed died on 26 May 2012, at the age of 77.

== Personal life ==
In the 1950s, Rashed married Abdul-Tawab Yossef, who was also involved in children's literature. Rashed's nickname became Mama Lubna after giving birth to her first daughter, Lubna. She had two other children, Bahsham and Essam.

== Recognition and legacy ==
Rashed was awarded the State Prize for Children's Literature in 1978. In 2002, she was awarded the Medal of the Council of the Ministry of Culture in Egypt.

In 2020, posthumously on her birthday, the day's Google Doodle featured Rashed.
