= Issam Amira =

Palestinian Islamic scholar

Sheikh Issam Amira
- الشيخ عصام عميرة

Religious life
- Religion: Islam
- Institute: Al-Rahman Mosque, Beit Safafa; Al-Aqsa Mosque

Military service
- Rank: Khatib; Imam

Issam Amira is a Palestinian Islamic scholar, preacher, khatib and imam at Al-Rahman Mosque in Beit Safafa and Al-Aqsa Mosque. He is also one of the prominent figures of Hizb ut-Tahrir.

In November 2018, Amira was arrested in Sur Baher and faced a ban from Al-Aqsa Mosque by Israeli police. This was the second ban imposed on him, lasting for a period of six months. The reason behind the ban was his praise of the Muslim teen who beheaded Samuel Paty. Prior to this incident, Amira had faced a previous ban for a duration of two weeks, which occurred two years earlier.
