= Esam (given name) =

Esam is a given name. Notable people with the name include:

- Esam Al-Kandari (born 1971), Kuwaiti footballer
- Esam Omeish (born 1967), Libyan-born American physician
- Esam Sakeen (born 1971), Kuwaiti footballer

== See also ==
- Sam (given name)
- Essam
