= Abdul-Tawab Yossef =

Egyptian children's author

Abdel-Tawab Youssef
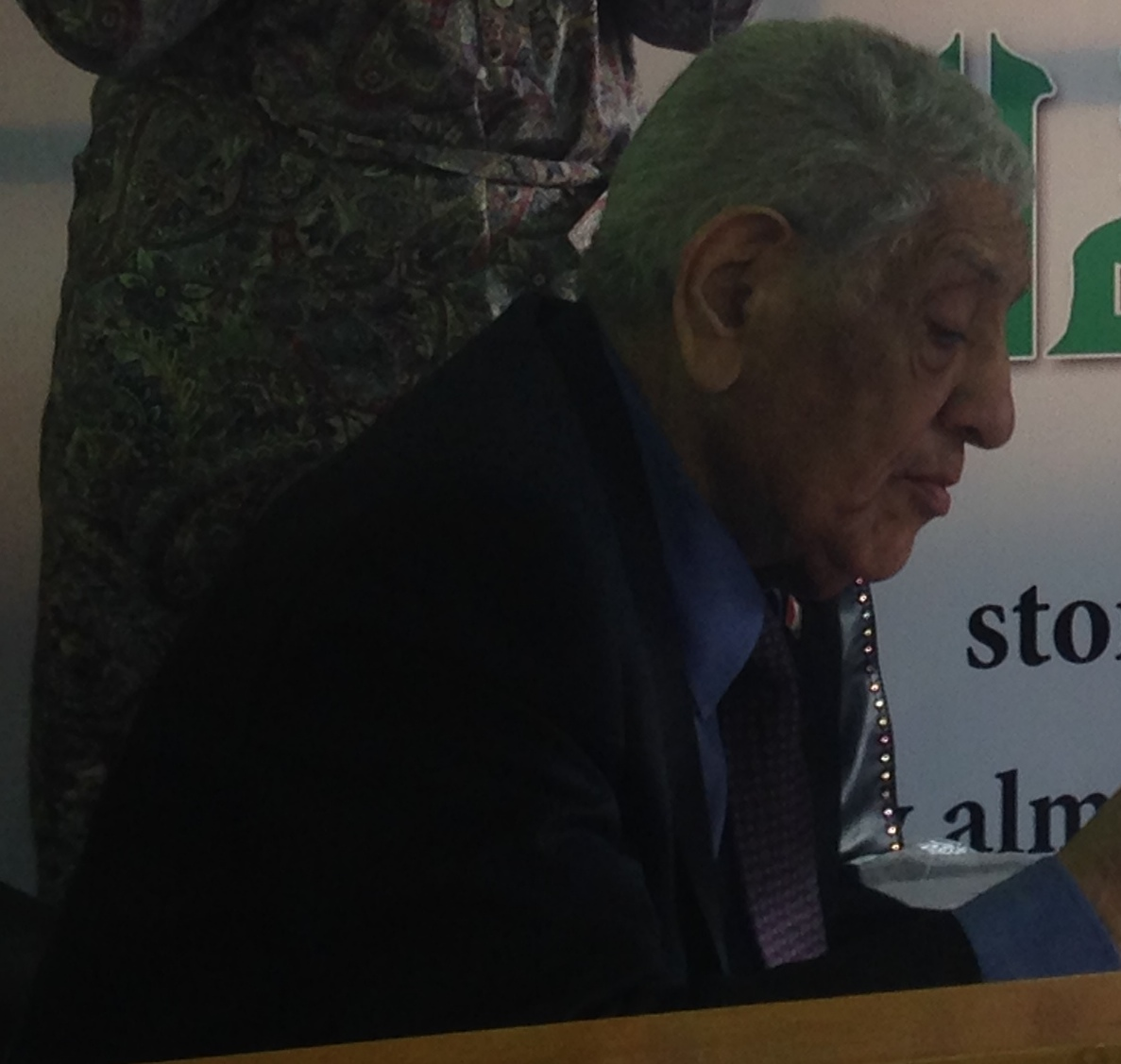
- 2014
- Born: Abdeltawab Youssef Ahmed Youssef; 1 October 1928
- Died: 28 September 2015 (aged 86)
- Known for: Children's literature

Abdeltawab Youssef Ahmed Youssef (Arabic: عبد التواب يوسف) was an Egyptian author, translator, and publisher.

== Biography ==
Also known as Abd Al-Tawwab Yousef Ahmad Yousef, Abdel-Tawab Yusuf, and Abdel-Tawab Jusef, he was born in the village of Shanra, Beni Suef Governorate, Egypt, on 1 October 1928.

He earned a BA degree in political science from Cairo University. After graduating, he worked as a supervisor for school radio programs at the Ministry of Education. Then he headed the Department of Journalism, Radio and Television. He worked so until he devoted himself to writing for children since 1975. He had the idea of issuing the first Islamic magazine for children, Paradise (Al-firdous) in 1969, and established the first conference on Child Culture in 1970.

He established the Children's Society, and specialized in children's literature. He was distinguished by his wide culture and concerns to present everything that is useful. 25 million copies of his books were published in Egypt, Beirut, Iraq, Kuwait, Qatar and Muscat. Some of his books have been translated into English, French, German, Persian, Indonesian, Chinese and Malaysian.

Among the most prominent prizes he received were:

- State Prize for Children's Literature in 1975
- UNESCO World Literacy Prize in 1975
- State Merit Prize for Children's Literature in 1981
- State Prize of Appreciation for Child Culture in 1981
- King Faisal International Prize for Arabic Literature in 1991
- Armed Forces Prize for Literature in October 1992
- First Prize in the competition for the best children's writer in 1998
- Suzanne Mubarak Prize in 1999 and 2000; With the Order of Sciences and Arts, First Class
- 2000 Bologna International Children's Book Fair for The Life of Muhammad in Twenty Stories
- Gold Medal from the Arab Broadcasting Union.

He died on 28 September 2015, three days before his 87th birthday.

== His life ==
=== His birth, childhood and youth ===
Abdel Tawab-Youssef was born in the village of Shanra, in the city of Al-Fashn, in the governorate of Beni Suef, on 1 October 1928. He received his primary and secondary education in the city of Beni Suef. He lived his childhood in the villages of Egypt and expressed this in his stories and creative works, as he used to rent novels and books to read and then repeat their story to his friends who are children.

He moved to Cairo in 1945 to begin his university studies at the Faculty of Economics and Political Science at Cairo University until he obtained a bachelor's degree in 1949. Six months after his graduation in January 1950, his father died, which posed a great challenge to him in his life, as he decided to move to Cairo With his mother and three sisters, between the ages of six and ten, to live, earn a living and educate his sisters. He obtained a master's degree in 1953.

=== His Marriage ===
In 1956, he married Notaila Ibrahim Rashed, former editor-in-chief of Samir Magazine and Crescent Books for Children, winner of the State Prize in Children's Literature in 1978 and the First Class Medal of Science and Arts.

They had three children:

- Lubna (born 1957), professor at the Department of English at the Faculty of Arts at Cairo University; faculty vice-dean for postgraduate studies.
- Hisham (born 1959), a diplomat; official spokesman and head of the office of the Secretary-General of the Arab League; head of the relief unit in the Organization of Islamic Cooperation in Jeddah, Saudi Arabia.
- Essam (born 1965), managing director of the Egyptian International Company for Environmental Protection; general manager for Montana Studios for Film Production; author of two novels.

== Years of work ==
His first children's work was broadcast on the Papa Charu program on 19 December 1950.

Since then, he wrote thousands of programs for children, which were presented on all Arab radio stations. He worked as a supervisor for school radio programs at the Ministry of Education after graduating from the university from 1950 to 1960. Then he headed the Department of Journalism, Radio and Television in them from 1960 to 1971; Then he headed the Culture Department from 1971 to 1975.

In the early 1970s, his first trips to the outside world was to Europe, and on this trip he got acquainted with new dimensions in the field of children's literature, then his interest in new dimensions increased when the Cairo International Book Fair was held, which allowed him to learn about the various schools and trends that interest children and write for him. He chose to write about religious aspect, nationalism, national values, educational attempts, science and its fields, the Arabic language, its nobility, ancient and modern, humanistic trends, recreation and entertainment, writing for the child and about the child and childhood. Until he devoted himself to writing for children since 1975, after a five-year break in political work. He stated in one of his press interviews, saying: “He showed me more of a reader than I am a writer, and during my travels I bought thousands of books until I had a library that says those who visited it from the English And the Americans, it is the largest home library for children in the world.”

He bought an apartment in which he deposited 30,000 books for children, left 10,000 books in his house, and deposited 5,000 books in his son's library.

Abdel Tawab-Youssef was a member of the Board of Directors of the Association of the Protectors of the Arabic Language since its inception and of the Children's Culture Committee of the Supreme Council of Culture since its inception, where he was its deputy rapporteur and the Family and Child Committee of the Supreme Council of Islamic Affairs, founder of the Egyptian Writers Union, and a member of the board of directors for twenty years. He served as Secretary-General for three years and witnessed the Federation's symposium on children's literature in Damascus, Baghdad and Bani Ghazi. He presented 595 books for children printed in Egypt, 125 books for children that were printed in the Arab countries, and 40 books for adults.

== Literary style ==
The family climate in which he was raised played a role in his literary style. He grew up in a middle class that made his writing influenced by the religious stories he presented in the form of hadiths for children.

He took an independent approach to writing, highlighting the focus on Islamic values and working on the merging of scientific and religious information at the same time. He said: "My methodology in writing for children begins with establishing a belief and then loving the Noble Qur’an for them. The children's memorizing verses of the Qur'an elevate them to the noble and miraculous style of the Qur'an. In my stories, I focused on birds and animals mentioned in the Holy Quran, which total 30 birds and animals. I started with a story about the whale, so I said I am a whale that weighs 75 tons, even though my egg cannot be seen with the naked eye."

== Literary production ==
His writings were characterized by diversity, and he drew inspiration from world folklore, religious heritage and Arab history. He employed Arab culture and Arab environments in his production. He enriched the Arab Library with a total of 951 literary works; 595 children's books were printed in Egypt; And 125 children's books were printed in the Arab countries; And 40 books for adults; In addition to two writers about the Prophet Muhammad's life in twenty stories, of which 7 million copies were printed; In addition to the field fiction, which printed 3,000,000 copies.

== His most prominent works for adults and children ==
| The Work | Description | Year | Note |
|---|---|---|---|
| The journey of the Noble Qur’an from hearts and texts to the written Qur’ans | He narrates the long journey of the holy verses since It came scattered from heaven inspired by spoken and unwritten, then preserved in the chests until they became written and printed in millions of copies, and the book is decorated with illustrations and authentic and reliable information. | 2000 | |
| Funny stories from hadiths (7-12) | A group of children's stories about animals mentioned in the noble Prophet's hadiths about the hot cow, the weeping camel, the frightened sheep, the two goats overturning, the fleeing camel, and the sick bird, in which there is entertainment, sermon, lesson, fun and interest for adults and children together. | 2000 | |
| Funny stories from hadiths (13-18) | This collection includes funny stories from the hadiths, in episodes 13-18 of them, and it contains educational stories that emerged great men, who built a civilization in which humanity is proud, and that preserves the values directed by the noble hadith, while simplifying, to bring closer the great educational goals of children's souls, Impress them with beautiful graphics and bright colors. In the Garden of Goodness, he tells the story of the cloud that is ordered to water the garden of a man, who gives alms a third of what comes out of it, and his dependents eat a third, and the last third is given in it. It shows the reality of the bankrupt whose good deeds are given to those who hurt them, and a debt remains on him, so he is satisfied by adding their mistakes to his mistakes. And he talks about the three laurel prisoners who were covered by the rock on the mountain, so they prayed to God for the good of their deeds, so they were released and escaped. Abu al-Dahdah makes two gardens that no one else owns a loan to God, and his wife prevents her children from eating her fruits because they have become God's right, and he is pleased with them. The Apostle advises the parents of the victorious captive by repeating, “There is no strength and no strength except in God Almighty,” so that their pious son will be able to save one hundred camels from his enemies. And he talks about high literature in a prophetic council in which the Messenger tests the intelligence of his companions, about the tree that is like a Muslim does not drop its leaves and bears its food every time with the permission of its Lord, and a boy refuses to answer with his knowledge that it is the palm tree, politeness with those who are older than him. | 2004 | |
| Q & A | addresses many questions that occurred to the child, Ahmed, and his grandfather answered him, with written answers illustrated in surprising and impressive pictures. | 2003 | |
| Laughing School (1 - 3) | This edition deals with a new series directed at adults and children together, and it brings familiar topics that it addresses in different ways, which may disturb adults, or not satisfy them. The series consists of three parts. The first provides an innovative way to understand lessons and obtain information in a way that keeps boredom away from students. The second, no ... for beating, deals with a number of correct and false physical and moral punishments inflicted on students, and the related funny stories presented by an interesting presentation. The third presents the resignation of a student for educators, a proposal to address the teaching problems, decisions, the relationship between students and their professors, the dryness of materials, and the shortcomings of students. | 2006 | |
| Basmalah (The Light of Faith) | It deals with the meanings inspired by the Basmalah with mentioning the story of Adas, who became Muslim thanks to it during the time of the Prophet, along with three short stories about it. | 1999 | |
| The Light of the Qur’an (1-4) | A series of stories inspired by the Qur’an dealing with the Night of Power, the Revelation of Heaven, the Qur’an, the Mother of Sultan, and the myths of the Auli. | 2001 | |
| Our children and the era of science and knowledge | It includes more modern chapters, which try to provide the workers in the field of general culture for children with a course that helps them to research, study, and gain experience, to build a strong cultural foundation on a solid foundation. | 2002 | |
| Child culture development | The culture of the Arab child deals with reality and prospects, developing children's emerging capabilities, the role of the family, distinct children's books, children's journalism, children and fiction, children and popular traditions. | 2002 | |
| Future Manager (1-6) | Reviews what are the duties of the director, and what are his responsibilities ..?! Can a child be a manager ..?! It deals with simple principles that the child can train to help him in managing his affairs and his life to grow up and achieve his dreams ... and it consists of the young director, the general manager himself, how to kill an idea, the green pile, let's disagree, and Abu Shady | 2008 | |
| Funny stories from hadiths (1-6) | A collection of children's stories about animals mentioned in the noble hadiths, with some entertainment, sermon, lesson, fun and interest for both adults and children. | 2007 | |

== New works ==
| Work | Description | Place and publisher | Year |
|---|---|---|---|
| People are able to fly, Jack and the Devil, a wolf and a little girl | Written by Virginia Hamilton and translated by Abdel Tawab Youssef | Cairo, the Egyptian General Book Authority | 2002 |
| Names and Tales (short stories) | Samir Aziz drawings | Cairo, the Egyptian General Book Authority | 2006 |
| From the tales of Shahrzad | Najwa Shalabi drawings | Cairo, the Egyptian General Book Authority | 2006 |
| Tales not very popular | Salah Besar drawings | Cairo, the Egyptian Lebanese House | 2006 |
| The lost hour | Jaber Nashed drawings | Cairo, the State Information Service | 2007 |
| The Birth of the Prophet in the Eyes of Verveon Anderson: A View in Constantinople by Hans Christian Andersen Arabization of Abdel Tawab Youssef and presented by Jaber Asfour | Salah Bitar drawings | Cairo, the Egyptian Lebanese House | 2009 |
| Ameen is the king of the book | | Cairo, Dar Al-Hilal | 2009 |
| Green plant planet | | Cairo, Talaie House for Publishing and Distribution | 2010 |
| Bride.com | Mamdouh Talaat and Mohammed Sami drawings | Cairo, Crescent Books | 2010 |
| Tiny Planet | | Cairo, Talaie House for Publishing and Distribution | 2010 |
| False Winning (Sulafa and Nabhan Stories) | Elham Al-Qadi drawings | Iraq, Dar Al-Buraq for the culture of the child | 2010 |
| Tunisian folk tales | Noor drawings | Cairo, the National Center for Child Culture | 2010 |
| belonging | Adel Al-Batrawi drawings | Cairo, the Egyptian General Book Authority | 2010 |

== Pillars of Islam series 5 x 5 ==
| Work | Drawings | Place and Publisher | Year |
|---|---|---|---|
| Adha Eid | Abdul Shafi Syed | Cairo, the Egyptian Book House | 1989 |
| Eid message | Abdul Shafi Syed | Cairo, the Egyptian Book House | 1989 |
| The first day of the Eid | Abdul Shafi Syed | Cairo, the Egyptian Book House | 1989 |
| Good Pilgrimage | Abdul Shafi Syed | Cairo, the Egyptian Book House | 1989 |
| Blackstone | Abdul Shafi Syed | Cairo, the Egyptian Book House | 1989 |
| Ramadan, The Doctor | Abdul Shafi Syed | Cairo, the Egyptian Book House | 1989 |
| The funny meeting | Abdul Shafi Syed | Cairo, the Egyptian Book House | 1989 |
| Ramadan Collection | Abdul Shafi Syed | Cairo, the Egyptian Book House | 1989 |
| The month of faith | Abdul Shafi Syed | Cairo, the Egyptian Book House | 1989 |
| Al Qadr Night | Abdul Shafi Syed | Cairo, the Egyptian Book House | 1989 |
| Zakat Al-Fitr | Abdul Shafi Syed | Cairo, the Egyptian Book House | 1989 |
| Blocker of Zakat | Abdul Shafi Syed | Cairo, the Egyptian Book House | 1989 |
| Allah's Right | Abdul Shafi Syed | Cairo, the Egyptian Book House | 1989 |
| Muslim money | Abdul Shafi Syed | Cairo, the Egyptian Book House | 1989 |
| Good loan | Abdul Shafi Syed | Cairo, the Egyptian Book House | 1989 |
| God's house | Abdul Shafi Syed | Cairo, the Egyptian Book House | 1989 |
| Alcurwan | Abdul Shafi Syed | Cairo, the Egyptian Book House | 1989 |
| Hesab thing | Abdul Shafi Syed | Cairo, the Egyptian Book House | 1989 |
| The mosque | Abdul Shafi Syed | Cairo, the Egyptian Book House | 1989 |
| A night in which prayer was imposed | Abdul Shafi Syed | Cairo, the Egyptian Book House | 1989 |
| The greatest Allah | Abdul Shafi Syed | Cairo, the Egyptian Book House | 1989 |
| Glory be to Allah | Abdul Shafi Syed | Cairo, the Egyptian Book House | 1989 |
| Relying on Allah | Abdul Shafi Syed | Cairo, the Egyptian Book House | 1989 |
| Alraziq Alraziq | Abdul Shafi Syed | Cairo, the Egyptian Book House | 1989 |
| The small Faithful | Abdul Shafi Syed | Cairo, the Egyptian Book House | 1989 |

== Peace Language Series for Children and Young People ==
| Work | Description | Place and Publisher | Year |
|---|---|---|---|
| Dialogue, quarrel, or poker [ḥwār ʾm šǧār ʾm nqār] | Sherif El-Banna drawings | Cairo, the State Information Service. | 2006 |
| He has nothing [mā ʿlyh šyʾ] | Sherif El-Banna drawings | Cairo, the State Information Service. | 2006 |
| Decent earshot [ālmsāmʿ krym] | Sherif El-Banna drawings | Cairo, the State Information Service. | 2006 |

== A series of stories of the miracles of the prophets ==
| Work | Description | Place and Publisher | Year |
|---|---|---|---|
| The miracle of the Prophet Ebraham | Muhammad Nabil | Cairo, Dar Al-Latif for Publishing and Distribution | 2006 |
| The miracle of the prophet Noah | Muhammad Nabil | Cairo, Dar Al-Latif for Publishing and Distribution | 2006 |
| The miracle of the Prophet Yosesef | Muhammad Nabil | Cairo, Dar Al-Latif for Publishing and Distribution | 2006 |
| The miracle of Prophet Saleh | Muhammad Nabil | Cairo, Dar Al-Latif for Publishing and Distribution | 2006 |
| The miracle of the Prophet Sulaiman | Muhammad Nabil | Cairo, Dar Al-Latif for Publishing and Distribution | 2006 |
| The miracle of the Prophet Jacob | Muhammad Nabil | Cairo, Dar Al-Latif for Publishing and Distribution | 2006 |
| The miracle of the Prophet Yunus | Muhammad Nabil | Cairo, Dar Al-Latif for Publishing and Distribution | 2006 |
| The miracle of the Prophet Moses | Muhammad Nabil | Cairo, Dar Al-Latif for Publishing and Distribution | 2006 |
| The miracle of the Prophet Jesus | Muhammad Nabil | Cairo, Dar Al-Latif for Publishing and Distribution | 2006 |
| The miracle of the Prophet Muhammad | Muhammad Nabil | Cairo, Dar Al-Latif for Publishing and Distribution | 2006 |

== Let us Educate series ==
| Work | description | Place and Publisher | Year |
|---|---|---|---|
| Melody magic [sḥr ālnġm] | Adel El-Batrawy | Cairo, the Egyptian Book House and the Lebanese Book House | 2008 |
| Fresh spring is the magic of melody [ālnbʿ ālʿḏb sḥr ālnġm] | Adel El-Batrawy | Cairo, the Egyptian Book House and the Lebanese Book House | 2008 |
| Educated cat [ālqṭ ālmṯqf] | Adel El-Batrawy | Cairo, the Egyptian Book House and the Lebanese Book House | 2008 |
| The Virtue of Growth [fḍylt ālnmw] | Adel El-Batrawy | Cairo, the Egyptian Book House and the Lebanese Book House | 2008 |
| pyramid stadium [ālhrm ālmdrǧ] | Adel El-Batrawy | Cairo, the Egyptian Book House and the Lebanese Book House | 2008 |
| Arts Complex [mǧmʿ ālfnwn] | Adel El-Batrawy | Cairo, the Egyptian Book House and the Lebanese Book House | 2008 |
| brave greetings [slām ālšǧʿān] | Adel El-Batrawy | Cairo, the Egyptian Book House and the Lebanese Book House | 2008 |
| Arts are sometimes crazy [ālfnwn ʾḥyānًā ǧnwn] | Adel El-Batrawy | Cairo, the Egyptian Book House and the Lebanese Book House | 2008 |
| My Happiness: Culture [sʿādty: ālṯqāfə] | Adel El-Batrawy | Cairo, the Egyptian Book House and the Lebanese Book House | 2008 |
| Towards a new culture [nḥw ṯqāfə ǧdydə] | Adel El-Batrawy | Cairo, the Egyptian Book House and the Lebanese Book House | 2008 |

== The best trip series ==
| Work | Description | Place and Publisher | Year |
|---|---|---|---|
| Let's go to Paris | Adel El-Batrawy | Cairo, House of Knowledge | 2008 |
| Let's go to Rome | Adel El-Batrawy | Cairo, House of Knowledge | 2008 |
| Let's go to London | Adel El-Batrawy | Cairo, House of Knowledge | 2008 |
| Let's go to Berlin | Adel El-Batrawy | Cairo, House of Knowledge | 2008 |
| Let's go to Madrid | Adel El-Batrawy | Cairo, House of Knowledge | 2008 |
| Let's go to Geneva | Adel El-Batrawy | Cairo, House of Knowledge | 2008 |
| Let's go to Sofia | Adel El-Batrawy | Cairo, House of Knowledge | 2008 |
| Let's go to Stockholm | Adel El-Batrawy | Cairo, House of Knowledge | 2008 |

== Palestinian Championships series ==
| Work | Drawing | Place and Publisher | Year |
|---|---|---|---|
| Reem and the crutches trick [rym wẖdʿt ālʿkāzyn] | Maher Abdel Qader | Giza, the Arab Media Center | 2010 |
| Talented Martyr Body [hyʾāt ālšhydə ālmwhwbə] | Maher Abdel Qader | Giza, the Arab Media Center | 2010 |
| Sana leap of martyrdom [snāʾ qfzət ālšhādə] | Maher Abdel Qader | Giza, the Arab Media Center | 2010 |
| Hanadi in the horror restaurant [hnādy fy mṭʿm ālrʿb] | Maher Abdel Qader | Giza, the Arab Media Center | 2010 |
| Wafaa and championship [beltwfāʾ wḥzām ālbṭwlə] | Maher Abdel Qader | Giza, the Arab Media Center | 2010 |

== Awards ==
Tawab-Youssef received many awards and honors such as:

- The Bologna International Children's Book Fair 2000
- State Prize for Children's Literature in 1975
- The UNESCO World Literacy Prize 1975
- The State Prize of Appreciation for Child Culture in 1981
- The King Faisal Prize in Arabic Literature 1991
- The Armed Forces Prize for Literature in October 1992
- First Prize in the competition for the Best Children's Writer in 1998
- The Suzanne Mubarak Prize in 1999 and 2000
- The Order of Sciences and Arts of the First Class
- Gold medal from the Arab Broadcasting Union.

== His efforts in the Arab world ==
Abdul Tawab-Yousef visited the United Arab Emirates to follow up on literacy efforts and participated in seminars and activities to eradicate illiteracy for children in Arab countries. Attended the Dubai Symposium on Children's Literature in 2004. An envoy from UNESCO, he visited Qatar three times to participate in seminars. Founded and headed the Children's Culture Association since 1968.

== Sayings about him ==
Suheir Al-Qalamawi said of him: "There are many people who write for children. But only a few have produced real literature, and ... Youssef is at their forefront, in terms of quantity and quality."

Desan Roul, President of the International Association for Children's Books, said of him: "Abd al-Tawab Youssef's library is the largest children's library in a household in all the world, and his books apply the same thing."

== His death ==
Abdel-Tawab Youssef died on the afternoon of Monday 28 September 2015, three days before his 87th birthday, following a health crisis that had afflicted him for several months. He left more than 1,000 children's books, achieving a record for a writer in Egypt and the world. The funeral took place at the Hosary Mosque on 6 October.
