= ESAM (gene) =

Protein-coding gene in humans

Identifiers
- Aliases: ESAM, W117m, endothelial cell adhesion molecule
- External IDs: OMIM: 614281; MGI: 1916774; GeneCards: ESAM

Gene location (Human)
Chr.	Chromosome 11 (human)
Band	11q24.2	Start	124,752,583 bp
Band	11q24.2	End	124,762,290 bp

Gene location (Mouse)
Chr.	Chromosome 9 (mouse)
Band	9|9 A4	Start	37,439,374 bp
Band	9|9 A4	End	37,449,615 bp
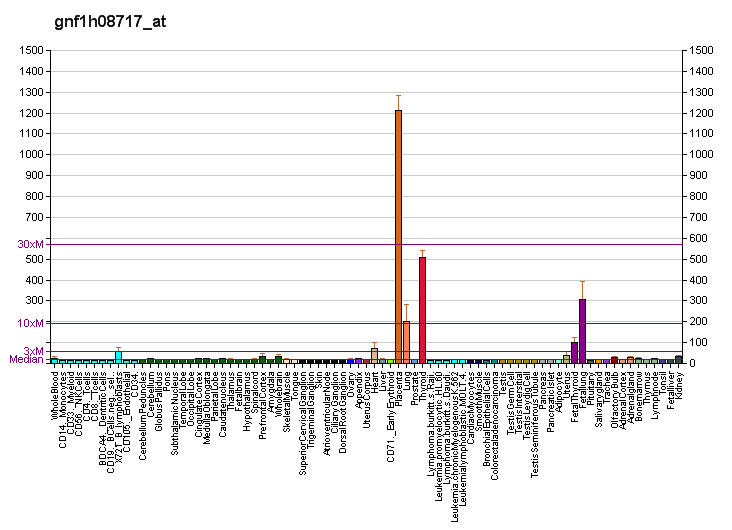
RNA expression pattern
Bgee	Human / Mouse (ortholog); Top expressed in: right lung; right lobe of thyroid gland; left lobe of thyroid gland; upper lobe of left lung; right coronary artery; popliteal artery; tibial arteries; apex of heart; left coronary artery; subcutaneous adipose tissue / Top expressed in: right lung lobe; left lung; left lung lobe; interventricular septum; decidua; digastric muscle; gastrula; cardiac muscles; myocardium of ventricle; right ventricle; More reference expression data
BioGPS	More reference expression data
Orthologs
Databases	NCBI: entry; OMA: entry
Species	Human	Mouse
Entrez	90952	69524
Ensembl	ENSG00000149564	ENSMUSG00000001946
UniProt	Q96AP7	Q925F2
RefSeq (mRNA)	NM_138961	NM_027102
RefSeq (protein)	NP_620411	NP_081378
Location (UCSC)	Chr 11: 124.75 – 124.76 Mb	Chr 9: 37.44 – 37.45 Mb
PubMed search
- Wikidata
View/Edit Human	View/Edit Mouse

Endothelial cell-selective adhesion molecule is a protein that in humans is encoded by the ESAM gene. A mutation in the ESAM gene is known to cause fetal intracranial hemorrhaging.
