= Ministry of Works (Bahrain) =

Government ministry of Bahrain

Ministry overview
- Formed: 1975 (51 years ago)
- Preceding Ministry: The Ministry of Works & Housing (MWH)
- Type: Government Ministry
- Jurisdiction: Cabinet of Bahrain
- Headquarters: Hoora, Manama; 26°14′15.9″N 50°35′17.5″E
- Employees: 1,572 (2009)
- Minister responsible: H.E. Ibrahim bin Hassan Al Hawaj
- Deputy Minister responsible: Shaikh Meshaal Al-Khalifa (Undersecretary)
- Website: works.gov.bh

Footnotes
- Construction - Project Management - Infrastructure Asset Management

The Ministry of Works (MOW) is responsible for all infrastructure services in the Kingdom of Bahrain, including the public road network, drainage systems, and public buildings. Its work—which encompasses strategic planning, design, development, construction, project management and maintenance—is carried out in accordance with the National Strategic Master Plan for Bahrain, outlook 2030. This national plan provides the legal framework for structural planning, strategic development and investment in the Kingdom, as well as a strong framework for development control.

The Ministry of Sectoral Planning is moving towards a model in which it will manage the core business areas of sectoral planning, policy development, and regulation. It will also outsource service delivery to the private sector. The Ministry's Central Planning Organization (CPO) coordinates the planning and implementation of all public infrastructure projects across the public sector as well as major industries, such as oil and gas. The CPO has developed a novel and sophisticated Geographic Information System (GIS) to support this function.

== History ==
The Ministry was originally part of the Ministry of Housing when it was established in 1975. At that time it comprised four directorates: Works, Electricity, Water, and Research and Projects.

In 1992, the Ministry was restructured into two sectors by Amiri Decree No. 3, 1992: Public Works and Electricity and Water. In 1995, a new structure emerged according to Amiri Decree No. 12, 1995 and the name of the Ministry became the Ministry of Works and Agriculture. In April 2001, it became the Ministry of Works. The cabinet added the Housing sector to the functions of the Ministry after Parliament elections in November 2002.

The Housing sector (formerly Ministry of Housing established in 1975) was responsible for providing housing services to citizens of the Kingdom with well-planned programs to provide suitable houses to Bahraini families incapable of building their own houses.

The Ministry of Works and Housing underwent several changes in its role and functions within the government structure. It is operating within two constraints: statutory, pertaining to the degree of harmony of its mission with its evolving environment, including civil service legislation; and budgetary, pertaining to the scarcity of resources available compared with those needed, at a time when public agencies are invited to rationalize public expenditure and improve the management of allocated resources.

In December 2007 according to a recently issued Decree, the Ministry of Works and Housing was again divided into two separate Ministries, one for Housing and one for Public Works. In that same decree, the Ministry of Electricity and Water was to become an Authority under the purview of the Minister of Works.

The Ministry is headed by Minister for Works H.E. Ibrahim bin Hassan Al Hawaj, appointed in June 2022.

== Recent projects ==
North Manama Causeway Phase 2 and Busaiteen Link Project, which included the construction of a large sand causeway for a six-lane, five-kilometer stretch motorway has been completed by the contractor Boskalis as of March 2022. The main contractor was a joint venture of Belgium's Six Construct (subsidiary of Besix) and the local Haji Hassan Group.

The 2018 Al-Fateh Highway Upgrade project which launched in 2018 and with a total costs of $107.32m (BD 40.5m) is expected to be completed by 2024.

== Photo gallery ==
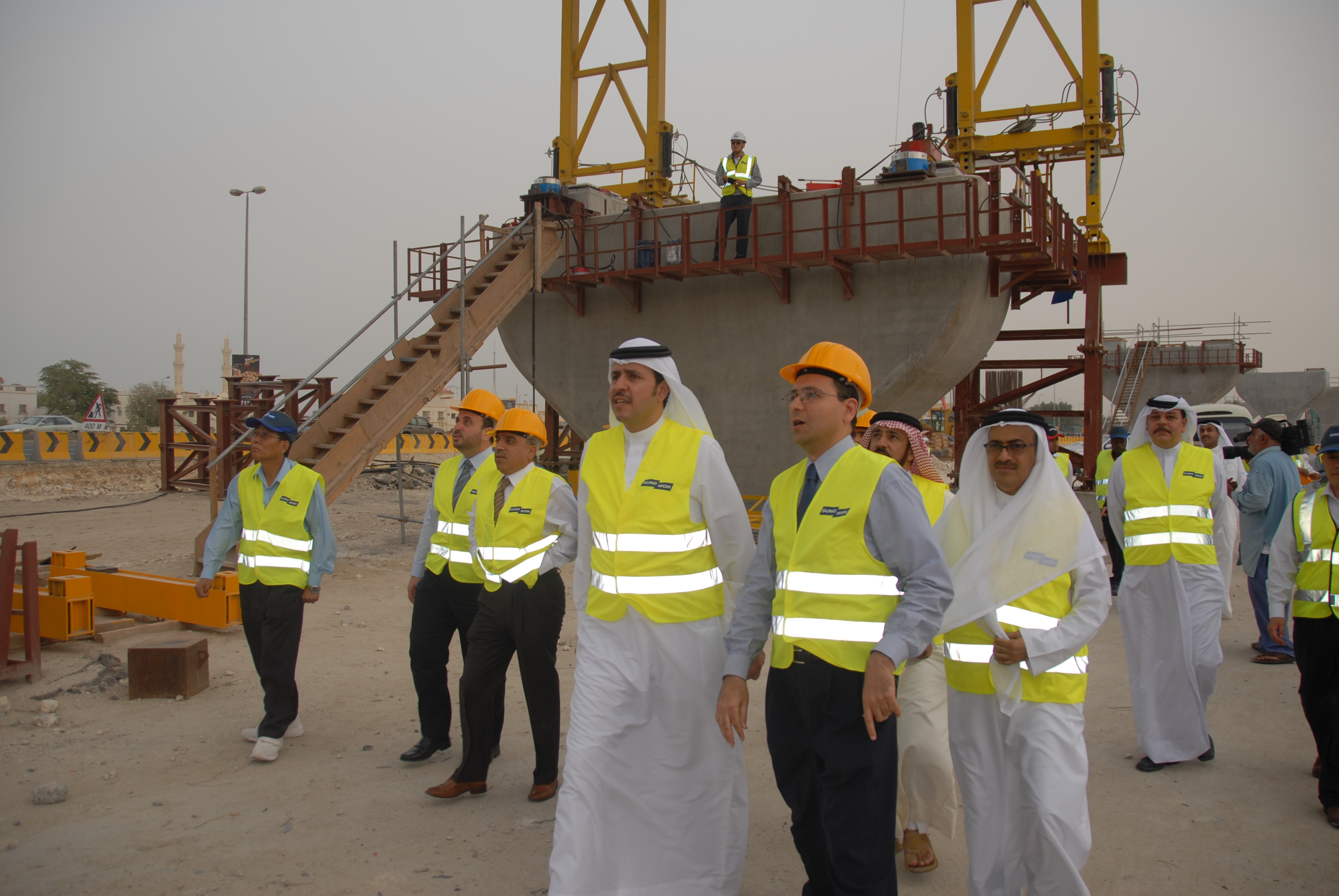
The former Minister of Works during a visit to Isa Town gate project (2009)

The former Minister of Works during an official function (2009)

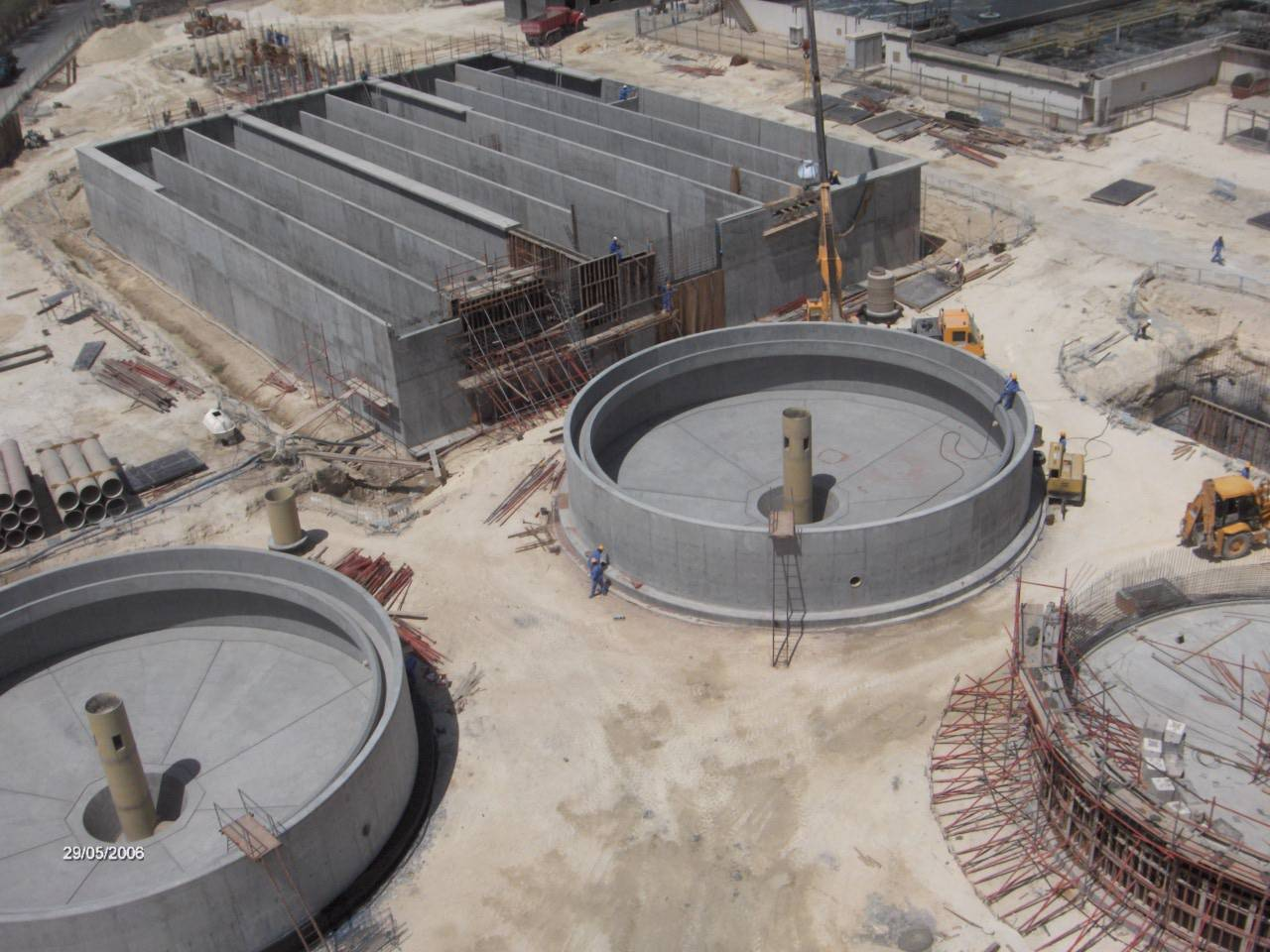
Sanitary treatment plant

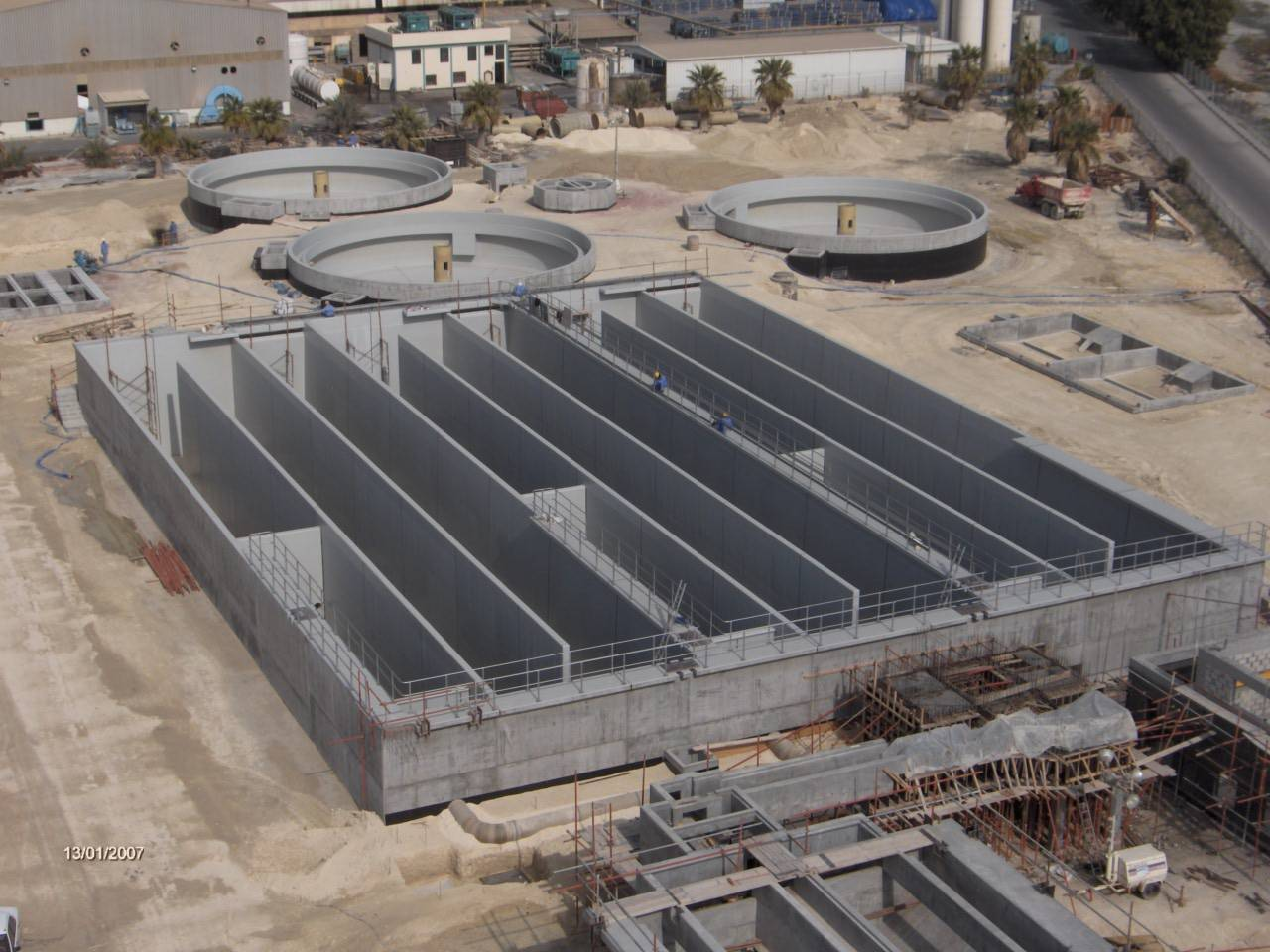
Sanitary treatment plant

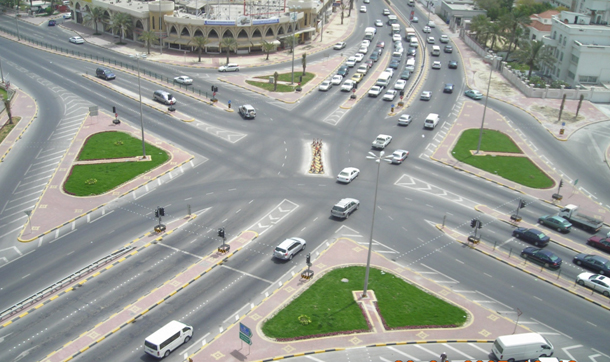
Salmania Intersection

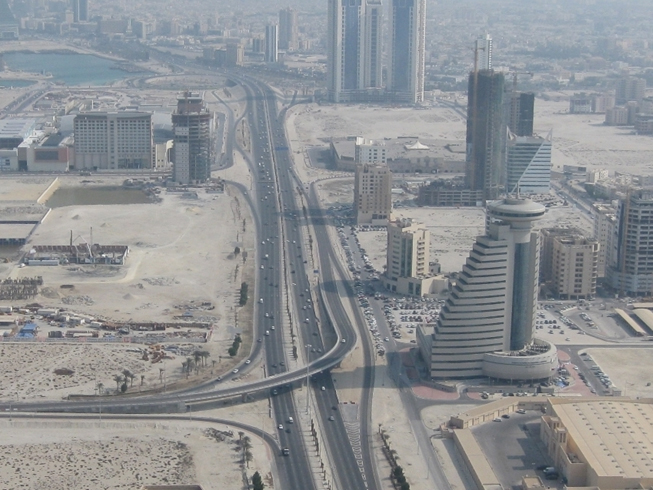
Seef District Flyover
