= Isam (name) =

Isam is a masculine given name. It means "safeguard". Notable people with the name include:

- Isam al-Attar (1927–2024), Muslim Brotherhood leader
- Isam Bachiri (born 1977), Danish rapper
- Isam Dart (1858–1900), American cattlemen
- Isam Faiz (born 2000), Moroccan football player
- Isam al-Qadi (died 2006), Palestinian Ba'thist politician
